= 2016–17 Copa del Rey =

115th Copa del Rey

Tournament details
- Country: Spain
- Teams: 83

Final positions
- Champions: Barcelona (29th title)
- Runners-up: Alavés

Tournament statistics
- Matches played: 112
- Goals scored: 342 (3.05 per match)
- Attendance: 1,413,041 (12,616 per match)
- Top goal scorer(s): Wissam Ben Yedder; Lionel Messi (5 goals each)

The 2016–17 Copa del Rey was the 115th staging of the Copa del Rey (including two seasons where two rival editions were played).

Barcelona were the two-time defending champions, and successfully defended their title following a 3–1 win over Alavés in the final.

As winners, Barcelona would have been assured a place for the 2017–18 UEFA Europa League group stage; however, since they already qualified for the Champions League by finishing 2nd in La Liga, the berth was instead passed down the league. Times up to 29 October 2016 and from 26 March 2017 are CEST (UTC+2). Times from 30 October 2016 to 25 March 2017 are CET (UTC+1).

== Schedule and format ==
Round	Draw date	Date	Fixtures	Clubs	Format details
First round	22 July 2016	31 August 2016	18	83 → 65	New entries: Clubs participating in Tercera and Segunda División B gained entry. Byes: Six teams from Segunda División B (Alcoyano, Arenas, Cartagena, Llagostera, Racing Santander and Tudelano) received a bye. Opponents seeding: Teams faced each other according to proximity criteria. Local team seeding: Draw of lots. Knock-out tournament type: Single match Copa Federación qualification: losers qualified for 2016–17 Copa Federación, National phase.
Second round	22 July 2016	7 September 2016	22	65 → 43	New entries: Clubs participating in Segunda División gained entry. Byes: One Segunda División team (Córdoba) received a bye. Opponents seeding: Segunda División teams faced each other. Local team seeding: Draw of lots. Knock-out tournament type: Single match
Third round	9 September 2016	12 October 2016	11	43 → 32	Byes: One team from Segunda División B or Tercera División or another from Segunda División which previously did not receive a bye (Huesca), received one. Opponents seeding: Segunda División teams faced each other. Local team seeding: Draw of lots. Knock-out tournament type: Single match
Round of 32	14 October 2016	30 November 2016	16	32 → 16	New entries: Clubs participating in La Liga gained entry. Opponents seeding: The seven teams from La Liga which qualified for 2016–17 UEFA competitions, faced the remaining seven teams from Segunda División B and Tercera División. The five Segunda División teams played against La Liga teams. The eight remaining La Liga teams faced each other. Local team seeding: First leg at home of team in lower division. Knock-out tournament type: Double match
Round of 32	14 October 2016	21 December 2016	16	32 → 16	New entries: Clubs participating in La Liga gained entry. Opponents seeding: The seven teams from La Liga which qualified for 2016–17 UEFA competitions, faced the remaining seven teams from Segunda División B and Tercera División. The five Segunda División teams played against La Liga teams. The eight remaining La Liga teams faced each other. Local team seeding: First leg at home of team in lower division. Knock-out tournament type: Double match
Round of 16	23 December 2016	4 January 2017	8	16 → 8	Opponents seeding: Draw of lots. Local team seeding: First leg at home of the team in the lower division. Knock-out tournament type: Double match
Round of 16	23 December 2016	11 January 2017	8	16 → 8	Opponents seeding: Draw of lots. Local team seeding: First leg at home of the team in the lower division. Knock-out tournament type: Double match
Quarter-finals	13 January 2017	18 January 2017	4	8 → 4	Opponents seeding: Draw of lots. Local team seeding: Luck of the draw. Knock-out tournament type: Double match
Quarter-finals	13 January 2017	25 January 2017	4	8 → 4	Opponents seeding: Draw of lots. Local team seeding: Luck of the draw. Knock-out tournament type: Double match
Semi-finals	27 January 2017	1 February 2017	2	4 → 2	Opponents seeding: Draw of lots. Local team seeding: Luck of the draw. Knock-out tournament type: Double match
Semi-finals	27 January 2017	8 February 2017	2	4 → 2	Opponents seeding: Draw of lots. Local team seeding: Luck of the draw. Knock-out tournament type: Double match
Final	27 January 2017	27 May 2017	1	2 → 1	Single match, stadium TBD by RFEF. UEFA Europa League qualification: winners qualified for the 2017–18 UEFA Europa League group stage.

Notes

- Double-match rounds enforced the away goals rule, single-match rounds did not.
- Games ending in a tie were decided in extra time, and if still level, by a penalty shoot-out.

== Qualified teams ==
The following teams qualified for the competition. Reserve teams were excluded.

La Liga the 20 teams of the 2015–16 season	Segunda División the 21 non-reserve teams of the 2015–16 season	Segunda División B the top five non-reserve teams of each group and the four with the highest number of points 2015–16 season excluding reserve teams	Tercera División the best non-reserve team of each one of the eighteen groups of the 2015–16 season
Athletic Bilbao; Atlético Madrid; Barcelona; Celta Vigo; Deportivo La Coruña; Eibar; Espanyol; Getafe; Granada; Las Palmas; Levante; Málaga; Rayo Vallecano; Real Betis; Real Madrid; Real Sociedad; Sevilla; Sporting Gijón; Valencia; Villarreal	Alavés; Albacete; Alcorcón; Almería; Córdoba; Elche; Gimnàstic; Girona; Huesca; Leganés; Llagostera; Lugo; Mallorca; Mirandés; Numancia; Osasuna; Oviedo; Ponferradina; Tenerife; Valladolid; Zaragoza	Alcoyano; Amorebieta; Arenas; Barakaldo; Burgos; Cádiz; Cartagena; Cornellà; Cultural Leonesa; Guijuelo; Hércules; Lleida Esportiu; Lorca FC; Murcia; Racing Ferrol; Racing Santander; Real Unión; Reus; Sestao River; Socuéllamos; Toledo; Tudelano; UCAM Murcia; UD Logroñés	Andorra; Atlético Cirbonero; Atlético Mancha Real; Atlético Saguntino; Atlético Sanluqueño; Boiro; Calahorra; Caudal; Conquense; Extremadura; Formentera; Laredo; Lorca Deportiva; Prat; San Sebastián de los Reyes; Villa de Santa Brígida; Zamora; Zamudio

== First round ==
The draw for the first and the second round was held on 22 July 2016 at 13:00 CEST in La Ciudad del Fútbol, RFEF headquarters, in Las Rozas, Madrid. In this round, 33 teams from the 2016–17 Segunda División B and nine from the 2016–17 Tercera División teams gained entry. In the draw, firstly six teams from Segunda División B received a bye and then, the remaining teams this league and teams from Tercera División faced according to proximity criteria by next groups:

Pot 1 Group 1	Pot 2 Group 2	Pot 3 Group 3	Pot 4 Group 4
Segunda División B: Boiro; Burgos; Caudal; Cultural Leonesa; Guijuelo; Ponferradina; Racing Ferrol; Racing Santander; Tudelano Tercera División: Atlético Cirbonero; Laredo; Zamora	Segunda División B: Albacete; Amorebieta; Arenas; Barakaldo; Real Unión; San Sebastián de los Reyes; Sestao River; Socuéllamos; Toledo; UD Logroñés; Zamudio Tercera División: Calahorra; Conquense; Villa de Santa Brígida	Segunda División B: Alcoyano; Atlético Saguntino; Cornellà; Hércules; Llagostera; Lleida Esportiu; Prat Tercera División: Andorra; Formentera	Segunda División B: Atlético Mancha Real; Atlético Sanluqueño; Cartagena; Extremadura; Lorca FC; Murcia Tercera División: Lorca Deportiva

- Alcoyano, Arenas, Cartagena, Llagostera, Racing Santander and Tudelano received a bye to the second round.

31 August 2016	Caudal	2–1	Burgos	Mieres
18:00	Roni 69'; Quero 90'	Report	Cusi 11'	Stadium: Hermanos Antuña; Attendance: 550; Referee: García Martín

31 August 2016	Andorra	0–5	Hércules	Andorra
18:00		Report	Mainz 28', 66'; Gaspar 70'; Juanma 87'; Nieto 90'	Stadium: Juan Antonio Endeiza; Attendance: 250; Referee: Galech Apezteguia

31 August 2016	Atlético Cirbonero	0–0 (a.e.t.) (6–5 p)	Ponferradina	Cintruénigo
19:00		Report		Stadium: San Juan; Attendance: 850; Referee: Sáez de Adana Oribe
	Penalties
	Álvarez (penalty scored); Viamonte (penalty scored); González (penalty scored); Alayeto (penalty scored); Hualde (penalty scored); Martínez (penalty missed); Isi (penalty scored)		(penalty scored) Fuster; (penalty scored) Cidoncha; (penalty scored) Rayco; (penalty scored) Menudo; (penalty scored) Jonathan Ruiz; (penalty missed) Pastrana; (penalty missed) Xisco Campos

31 August 2016	Boiro	1–3 (a.e.t.)	Guijuelo	Boiro
20:00	Gonzalo 3'	Report	Pino 8'; Vidal 105'; Dimas 120'	Stadium: Barraña; Attendance: 1,000; Referee: Jaime Ruiz Álvarez

31 August 2016	Sestao River	4–2	Villa de Santa Brígida	Sestao
20:00	Rodri 56'; Jon García 75'; Santamaría 88'; Elguezabal 89'	Report	Trujillo 9', 54'	Stadium: Las Llanas; Attendance: 1,000; Referee: José Antonio López Toca

31 August 2016	Amorebieta	2–1 (a.e.t.)	Socuéllamos	Amorebieta-Etxano
20:00	Olaortua 57'; Dani Hernández 97'	Report	Diego Sánchez 16'	Stadium: Urritxe; Attendance: 600; Referee: Sergio Usón Rosel

31 August 2016	Atlético Saguntino	1–1 (a.e.t.) (3–4 p)	Formentera	Sagunto
20:00	David Fas 72'	Report	Juan Antonio 11'	Stadium: Morvedre; Attendance: 1,000; Referee: Albert Ávalos Martos
	Penalties
	Lois (penalty missed); David Fas (penalty scored); Pibe (penalty missed); Gámez (penalty scored); Ferreras (penalty scored)		(penalty scored) Liñán; (penalty scored) Dailos; (penalty missed) Gabri; (penalty scored) Lolo; (penalty scored) Juan Antonio

31 August 2016	Laredo	2–3 (a.e.t.)	Cultural Leonesa	Laredo
20:30	Luis 47'; Vina 75'	Report	Moreno 17'; Gallar 80'; Ángel Bastos 103'	Stadium: San Lorenzo; Attendance: 600; Referee: Carlos Álvarez Fernández

31 August 2016	Barakaldo	4–0	Zamudio	Barakaldo
20:30	Vitoria 7', 88'; Yurrebaso 27', 35'	Report		Stadium: Lasesarre; Attendance: 1,000; Referee: César Díez Cano

31 August 2016	Calahorra	0–0 (a.e.t.) (3–1 p)	UD Logroñés	Calahorra
20:30		Report		Stadium: La Planilla; Attendance: 700; Referee: David Recio Moreno
	Penalties
	Del Puente (penalty scored); Satrústegui (penalty scored); Cristian (penalty scored); Toledo (penalty scored)		(penalty missed) Adrián León; (penalty scored) Espina; (penalty missed) Mendi; (penalty missed) Chevi

31 August 2016	Lleida Esportiu	1–0	Prat	Mollerussa (Note: Lleida Esportiu played their first round match at Estadi Municipal, Mollerussa, instead of their regular stadium Camp d'Esports, Lleida.)
20:30	Moreno 60'	Report		Stadium: Municipal; Referee: Daniel Yuste Querol

31 August 2016	Lorca Deportiva	1–2 (a.e.t.)	Lorca FC	Lorca
20:45	Momprevil 90'	Report	Onwu 89', 104'	Stadium: Mundial 82; Attendance: 1,000; Referee: Antonio Artacho Cobo

31 August 2016	Cornellà	2–1 (a.e.t.)	San Sebastián de los Reyes	Cornellà de Llobregat
20:45	Enric 78'; Borja López 120'	Report	Rubén Negredo 89'	Stadium: Nou Camp; Attendance: 500; Referee: Víctor Rives Leal

31 August 2016	Racing Ferrol	3–2	Zamora	Ferrol
21:00	Sergio Martín 22'; Nano 68'; Delgado 76'	Report	Caramelo 25'; Iñaki 79'	Stadium: A Malata; Attendance: 1,000; Referee: Eduardo Rodríguez García

31 August 2016	Albacete	2–1	Real Unión	Albacete
21:00	Aridane 13'; Agulló 22'	Report	Urkizu 87'	Stadium: Carlos Belmonte; Attendance: 2,000; Referee: Rafael Sánchez López

31 August 2016	Extremadura	5–0	Atlético Mancha Real	Almendralejo
21:00	Javi Pérez 17'; Willy 36'; Diego Díaz 77'; Agudo 87'; José Manuel 89'	Report		Stadium: Francisco de la Hera; Attendance: 1,500; Referee: Rubén Ruipérez Marín

31 August 2016	Toledo	2–0	Conquense	Toledo
21:30	Owusu 90+5', 90+7'	Report		Stadium: Salto del Caballo; Referee: Alfonso Vicente Moral

31 August 2016	Atlético Sanluqueño	1–0	Murcia	Sanlúcar de Barrameda
21:30	José 76'	Report		Stadium: El Palmar; Attendance: 2,000; Referee: Francisco José Hernández Maeso

== Second round ==
In the second round teams from Segunda División played among themselves and teams from Segunda División B and Tercera played separately. Córdoba received a bye to the third round.

6 September 2016	Mirandés	2–2 (a.e.t.) (3–4 p)	Elche	Miranda de Ebro
19:00	Sangalli 25'; Guarrotxena 58'	Report	Guillermo 17'; Nino 76'	Stadium: Anduva; Attendance: 2,727; Referee: Prieto Iglesias
	Penalties
	Eguaras (penalty scored); Guarrotxena (penalty missed); Aurtenetxe (penalty scored); Mesa (penalty scored); Salinas (penalty missed)		(penalty scored) Fraile; (penalty scored) Nino; (penalty scored) Pinto; (penalty scored) Pelayo

6 September 2016	Lugo	1–2	Tenerife	Lugo
20:00	Iriome 22'	Report	Germán 39'; Cristo González 60'	Stadium: Anxo Carro; Attendance: 2,500; Referee: Areces Franco

6 September 2016	Almería	0–2	Rayo Vallecano	Almería
22:00		Report	Aguirre 62', 90'	Stadium: Juegos Mediterráneos; Attendance: 5,397; Referee: Arcediano Monescillo

7 September 2016	Albacete	2–0	Arenas	Albacete
17:00	Aketxe 48' (pen.); Ibon Díez 85' (o.g.)	Report		Stadium: Carlos Belmonte; Attendance: 1,314; Referee: Campos Salinas

7 September 2016	Tudelano	1–0	Atlético Sanluqueño	Tudela
17:00	Ion Vélez 82' (pen.)	Report		Stadium: Ciudad de Tudela; Attendance: 450; Referee: Herrero Arenas

7 September 2016	Caudal	1–0	Lleida Esportiu	Mieres
17:45	David González 27'	Report		Stadium: Hermanos Antuña; Attendance: 600; Referee: López Parra

7 September 2016	Gimnàstic	1–0 (a.e.t.)	Numancia	Tarragona
19:00	José Carlos 100'	Report		Stadium: Nou Estadi; Attendance: 3,787; Referee: Sagués Oscoz

7 September 2016	Formentera	2–2 (a.e.t.) (10–9 p)	Lorca FC	Sant Francesc Xavier
19:30	Juan Antonio 67'; Lolo 73'	Report	Albisua 20'; Mikel 44'	Stadium: Municipal; Attendance: 400; Referee: Montes García-Navas
	Penalties
	Kiko (penalty missed); Javi Rosa (penalty scored); Goku (penalty missed); Lolo (penalty scored); Juan Antonio (penalty scored); Larra (penalty scored); Gabri (penalty scored); Piña (penalty scored); Ojeda (penalty scored); Marcos (penalty missed); Lolo (penalty scored); Javi Rosa (penalty scored); Larra (penalty scored)		(penalty scored) Chumbi; (penalty scored) Mikel; (penalty missed) Javi López; (penalty missed) Borja García; (penalty scored) C. Martínez; (penalty scored) Borja Martínez; (penalty scored) A. López; (penalty scored) Pina; (penalty scored) Menéndez; (penalty missed) Dorronsoro; (penalty scored) Chumbi; (penalty scored) Borja García; (penalty missed) Mikel

7 September 2016	Cádiz	1–1 (a.e.t.) (3–2 p)	Levante	Cádiz
20:00	Güiza 42'	Report	Roger 71'	Stadium: Ramón de Carranza; Attendance: 12,389; Referee: Alberola Rojas
	Penalties
	Cruz (penalty missed); García (penalty scored); Santamaría (penalty scored); Oliván (penalty scored)		(penalty scored) Espinosa; (penalty missed) Verza; (penalty missed) Montañés; (penalty scored) Roger; (penalty missed) Campaña

7 September 2016	Guijuelo	1–0	Sestao River	Guijuelo
20:15	Raúl 22'	Report		Stadium: Municipal; Attendance: 600; Referee: Sánchez Laso

7 September 2016	Racing Santander	2–1	Llagostera	Santander
20:30	Quintana 30'; Héber 50'	Report	Cano 55'	Stadium: El Sardinero; Attendance: 5,456; Referee: Román Román

7 September 2016	Racing Ferrol	0–0 (a.e.t.) (4–5 p)	Atlético Cirbonero	Ferrol
20:30		Report		Stadium: A Malata; Attendance: 1,200; Referee: Alonso Prendes
	Penalties
	Bandera (penalty scored); Martín (penalty scored); Bicho (penalty scored); Cruz (penalty scored); Joselu (born 1987) (penalty missed); Felip (penalty missed)		(penalty scored) Álvarez; (penalty missed) Rodrigo; (penalty scored) González; (penalty scored) Hualde; (penalty scored) Isi; (penalty scored) Celihueta

7 September 2016	Cultural Leonesa	3–1	Calahorra	León
20:30	Colinas 10'; I. González 29'; Moreno 90'	Report	Mario 31'	Stadium: Reino de León; Attendance: 1,613; Referee: Espasandín Cores

7 September 2016	Barakaldo	3–3 (a.e.t.) (2–3 p)	Amorebieta	Barakaldo
20:30	Vitoria 15', 60'; Yurrebaso 23'	Report	González 52'; Obieta 54', 89'	Stadium: Lasesarre; Attendance: 700; Referee: Leo Ollo
	Penalties
	Pérez (penalty scored); Cerrajería (penalty missed); Etxebarria (penalty scored); David (penalty missed); Candela (penalty missed)		(penalty missed) Castro; (penalty missed) Goñi; (penalty scored) González; (penalty scored) Dieng; (penalty scored) Alec

7 September 2016	Toledo	4–0	Alcoyano	Toledo
20:30	González 50', 78'; Roberto 62', 84'	Report		Stadium: Salto del Caballo; Attendance: 1,600; Referee: Santos Pargaña

7 September 2016	Cornellà	3–1 (a.e.t.)	Extremadura	Cornellà de Llobregat
20:45	Sierra 73'; Gallego 104'; García 118'	Report	Willy 22'	Stadium: Municipal; Attendance: 600; Referee: Iván González

7 September 2016	Cartagena	1–1 (a.e.t.) (5–6 p)	Hércules	Cartagena
21:30	Arturo 87'	Report	Salinas 55'	Stadium: Cartagonova; Attendance: 7,600; Referee: Montero De Lerma
	Penalties
	Martín (penalty scored); Juanlu (penalty scored); Fernando (penalty missed); Arturo (penalty scored); Rico (penalty scored); Verdú (penalty scored); Míchel (penalty missed)		(penalty scored) Chechu; (penalty missed) Fernando; (penalty scored) Miñano; (penalty scored) Gaspar; (penalty scored) Mainz; (penalty scored) Pol; (penalty scored) Dalmau

7 September 2016	Zaragoza	1–2	Valladolid	Zaragoza
22:00	Popa 69'	Report	Míchel 5'; Raúl de Tomás 33'	Stadium: La Romareda; Attendance: 10,525; Referee: Arias López

7 September 2016	Mallorca	1–0 (a.e.t.)	Reus	Palma
22:00	Brandon 93'	Report		Stadium: Iberostar; Attendance: 4,790; Referee: Pulido Santana

8 September 2016	Huesca	1–0	Girona	Huesca
19:00	David Ferreiro 86'	Report		Stadium: El Alcoraz; Attendance: 2,012; Referee: Ais Reig

8 September 2016	UCAM Murcia	4–3 (a.e.t.)	Oviedo	Murcia
20:00	Nono 26'; Juande 33'; Tito 63', 110'	Report	Linares 23'; Michu 82', 90+3'	Stadium: La Condomina; Attendance: 2,964; Referee: Guillermo Cuadra Fernández

8 September 2016	Alcorcón	1–0	Getafe	Alcorcón
22:00	Iván Alejo 18'	Report		Stadium: Santo Domingo; Attendance: 1,947; Referee: Valdés Aller

== Third round ==
The third round was played in a similar format to the second one. Huesca received a bye to the round of 32.

11 October 2016	Elche (2)	0–1	Alcorcón (2)	Elche
21:00		Report	Luis Fernández 75'	Stadium: Manuel Martínez Valero; Attendance: 5,470; Referee: Figueroa Vázquez

12 October 2016	Tudelano (3)	0–0 (a.e.t.) (3–4 p)	Formentera (4)	Tudela
12:00		Report		Stadium: Ciudad de Tudela; Attendance: 1,500; Referee: Baiges Dones
	Penalties
	Lázaro (penalty missed); Óscar Vega (penalty scored); Iñigo Ros (penalty missed); Javi Cabezas (penalty scored); Iñaki (penalty scored)		(penalty scored) Liñán; (penalty scored) Javi Rosa; (penalty missed) Larra; (penalty scored) Lolo; (penalty scored) Juan Antonio

12 October 2016	Mallorca (2)	1–2	UCAM Murcia (2)	Palma
12:00	Salomão 56'	Report	Juanma 5'; Jesús Imaz 70'	Stadium: Iberostar; Attendance: 5,651; Referee: Medié Jiménez

12 October 2016	Atlético Cirbonero (4)	1–2 (a.e.t.)	Guijuelo (3)	Cintruénigo
17:00	González 109'	Report	Carmona 111'; Aspas 120'	Stadium: San Juan; Attendance: 1,500; Referee: Rezola Etxeberria

12 October 2016	Rayo Vallecano (2)	1–1 (a.e.t.) (4–5 p)	Gimnàstic (2)	Madrid
17:00	Manucho 51'	Report	Maloku 24'	Stadium: Vallecas; Attendance: 5,282; Referee: Eiriz Mata
	Penalties
	Trashorras (penalty missed); Zé Castro (penalty scored); Nacho (penalty missed); Miku (penalty scored); Manucho (penalty scored); Beltrán (penalty scored); Quini (penalty missed)		(penalty scored) Madinda; (penalty scored) Kakabadze; (penalty missed) López; (penalty missed) Emaná; (penalty scored) Moha; (penalty scored) Suzuki; (penalty scored) Molina

12 October 2016	Racing Santander (3)	2–0	Amorebieta (3)	Santander
18:00	Aquino 21'; César Díaz 90'	Report		Stadium: El Sardinero; Attendance: 9,719; Referee: Carbajales Gómez

12 October 2016	Cultural Leonesa (3)	2–1 (a.e.t.)	Albacete (3)	León
18:00	Mario Ortiz 76'; Gallar 103'	Report	Aketxe 72'	Stadium: Reino de León; Attendance: 3,616; Referee: J. Iglesias Villanueva

12 October 2016	Hércules (3)	2–1	Cornellà (3)	Alicante
18:00	Chechu 76'; Gaspar 59' (pen.)	Report	Enric 80'	Stadium: José Rico Pérez; Attendance: 6,000; Referee: Varón Aceitón

12 October 2016	Toledo (3)	4–1	Caudal (3)	Toledo
19:00	Grbović 44'; Toni 69'; Lolo 76' (pen.); González 90'	Report	Álvarez 45'	Stadium: Salto del Caballo; Attendance: 2,500; Referee: Muñoz Piedra

12 October 2016	Cádiz (2)	1–2	Córdoba (2)	Cádiz
19:00	García 35'	Report	Juli 28'; Piovaccari 40'	Stadium: Ramón de Carranza; Attendance: 10,966; Referee: De la Fuente Ramos

12 October 2016	Valladolid (2)	3–1 (a.e.t.)	Tenerife (2)	Valladolid
21:00	Dražić 79', 120' de Tomás 98'	Report	Amath 84'	Stadium: José Zorrilla; Attendance: 4,210; Referee: Pérez Montero

== Final phase ==
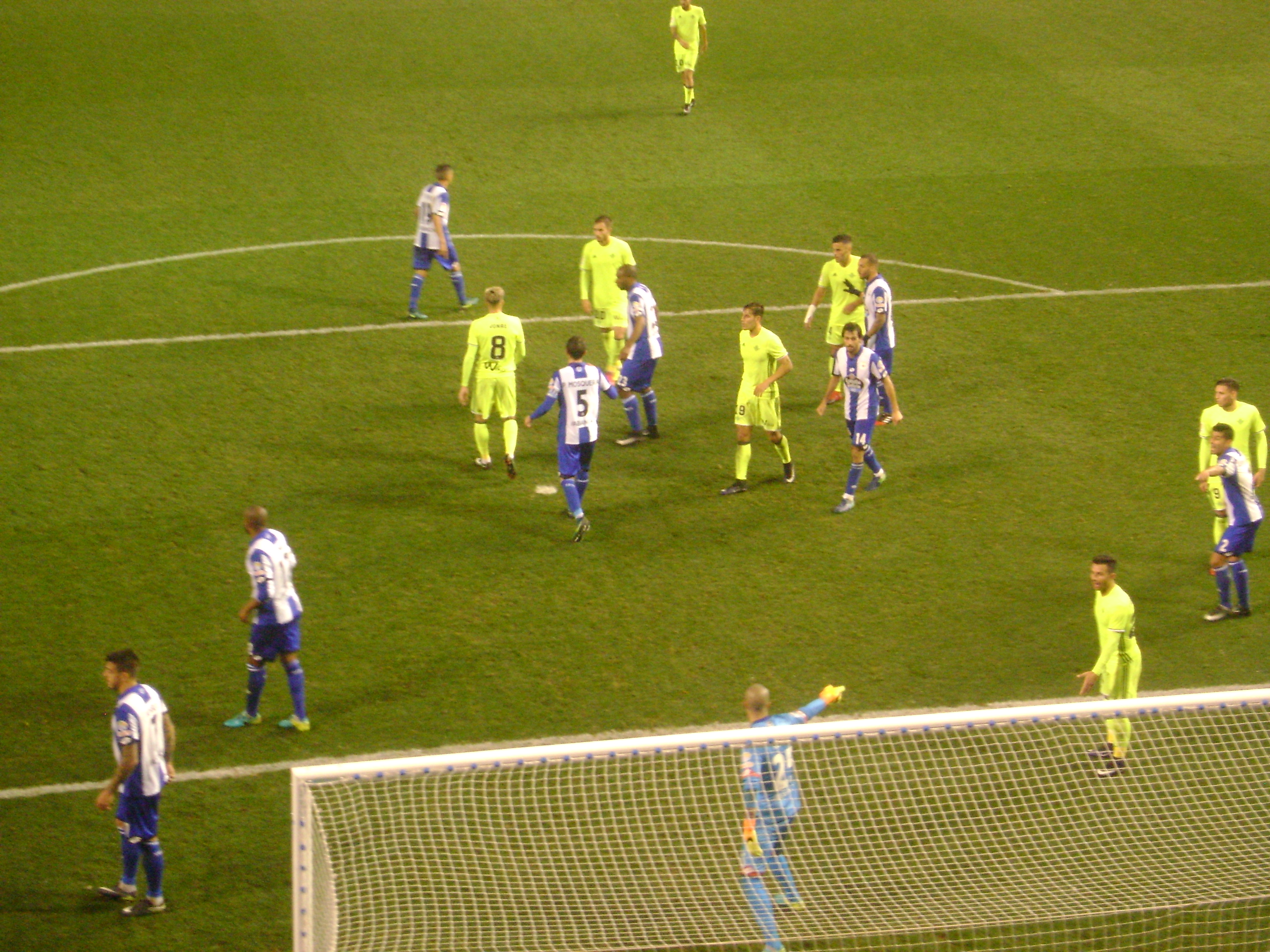
Match between Deportivo de La Coruña and Real Betis in the Round of 32.

The draw for the Round of 32 was held on 14 October 2016, in La Ciudad del Fútbol. In this round, all La Liga teams entered the competition.

Round of 32 pairings were as follows: the six remaining teams participating in the 2016–17 Segunda División B and Tercera División faced the 2016–17 La Liga teams which qualified for European competitions. The six remaining teams participating in Segunda División faced five La Liga teams which did not qualify for European competitions and the remaining Europa League team from the pot 2 that was not faced with any team from the pot 1. The remaining eight La Liga teams faced each other. In matches involving teams from different league tiers, the team in the lower tier played the first leg at home. This rule will also be applied in the Round of 16, but not for the Quarter-finals and Semi-finals, in which the order of legs will be based on the luck of the draw.

Pot 1 Segunda B and Tercera División	Pot 2 European competitions	Pot 3 Segunda División	Pot 4 Rest of Primera División
Cultural Leonesa; Formentera; Guijuelo; Hércules; Racing Santander; Toledo	Champions League: Atlético Madrid; Barcelona (TH); Real Madrid; Sevilla; Villarreal (Note: As it started playing in Champions League, Villarreal was integrated in this pot.) Europa League: Athletic Bilbao; Celta Vigo	Alcorcón; Córdoba; Gimnàstic; Huesca; UCAM Murcia; Valladolid	Alavés; Deportivo La Coruña; Eibar; Espanyol; Granada; Las Palmas; Leganés; Málaga; Osasuna; Real Betis; Real Sociedad; Sporting Gijón; Valencia

=== Bracket ===
Round of 32
Huesca	2	1	3
Las Palmas	2	5	7
Guijuelo	0	1	1
Atlético Madrid	6	4	10
Granada	1	0	1
Osasuna	0	2	2
Sporting Gijón	1	1	2
Eibar	2	3	5
Valladolid	1	1	2
Real Sociedad	3	1	4
Toledo	0	1	1
Villarreal	3	1	4
Racing Santander	1	0	1
Athletic Bilbao	2	3	5
Hércules	1	0	1
Barcelona	1	7	8
Cultural Leonesa	1	1	2
Real Madrid	7	6	13
Formentera	1	1	2
Sevilla	5	9	14
Leganés	1	1	2
Valencia	3	2	5
UCAM Murcia	0	0	0
Celta Vigo	1	1	2
Alcorcón (p)	1	1	2
Espanyol	1	1	2
Córdoba	2	4	6
Málaga	0	3	3
Real Betis	1	1	2
Deportivo La Coruña	0	3	3
Gimnàstic	0	0	0
Alavés	3	3	6

Round of 16
Las Palmas	0	3	3
Atlético Madrid	2	2	4
Osasuna	0	0	0
Eibar	3	0	3
Real Sociedad	3	1	4
Villarreal	1	1	2
Athletic Bilbao	2	1	3
Barcelona	1	3	4
Real Madrid	3	3	6
Sevilla	0	3	3
Valencia	1	1	2
Celta Vigo	4	2	6
Alcorcón	0	2	2
Córdoba	0	1	1
Deportivo La Coruña	2	1	3
Alavés (a)	2	1	3

Quarter-finals
Atlético Madrid	3	2	5
Eibar	0	2	2
Real Sociedad	0	2	2
Barcelona	1	5	6
Real Madrid	1	2	3
Celta Vigo	2	2	4
Alcorcón	0	0	0
Alavés	2	0	2

Semi-finals
Atlético Madrid	1	1	2
Barcelona	2	1	3
Celta Vigo	0	0	0
Alavés	0	1	1

Final
Barcelona	3
Alavés	1

== Round of 32 ==
Team 1	Agg.	Team 2	1st leg	2nd leg
Toledo (3)	1–4	Villarreal (1)	0–3	1–1
Formentera (4)	2–14	Sevilla (1)	1–5	1–9
Cultural Leonesa (3)	2–13	Real Madrid (1)	1–7	1–6
Hércules (3)	1–8	Barcelona (1)	1–1	0–7
Guijuelo (3)	1–10	Atlético Madrid (1)	0–6	1–4
Racing Santander (3)	1–5	Athletic Bilbao (1)	1–2	0–3
UCAM Murcia (2)	0–2	Celta Vigo (1)	0–1	0–1
Córdoba (2)	6–3	Málaga (1)	2–0	4–3
Valladolid (2)	2–4	Real Sociedad (1)	1–3	1–1
Huesca (2)	3–4	Las Palmas (1)	2–2	1–2
Gimnàstic (2)	0–6	Alavés (1)	0–3	0–3
Alcorcón (2)	2–2 (4–3 p)	Espanyol (1)	1–1	1–1
Sporting Gijón (1)	2–5	Eibar (1)	1–2	1–3
Granada (1)	1–2	Osasuna (1)	1–0	0–2
Leganés (1)	2–5	Valencia (1)	1–3	1–2
Real Betis (1)	2–3	Deportivo La Coruña (1)	1–0	1–3

=== First leg ===
26 October 2016	Cultural Leonesa	1–7	Real Madrid	León
21:00	Benja 84'	Report	Zuiverloon 6' (o.g.); Asensio 32', 53'; Morata 46', 55'; Nacho 68'; Mariano 90+2'	Stadium: Reino de León; Attendance: 11,516; Referee: Trujillo Suárez

29 November 2016	Leganés	1–3	Valencia	Leganés
20:00	Machís 59'	Report	Munir 3'; Medrán 25'; Bakkali 90+1'	Stadium: Butarque; Attendance: 6,781; Referee: González González

29 November 2016	Alcorcón	1–1	Espanyol	Alcorcón
21:00	Álvaro 51'	Report	Reyes 84'	Stadium: Santo Domingo; Attendance: 1,687; Referee: Gil Manzano

29 November 2016	Sporting Gijón	1–2	Eibar	Gijón
21:00	Viguera 62'	Report	Bebé 2'; Rubén Peña 89'	Stadium: El Molinón; Attendance: 11,806; Referee: José María Sánchez Martínez

29 November 2016	Real Betis	1–0	Deportivo La Coruña	Seville
22:00	Sanabria 19'	Report		Stadium: Benito Villamarín; Attendance: 18,774; Referee: Ricardo de Burgos Bengoetxea

30 November 2016	Toledo	0–3	Villarreal	Toledo
19:00		Report	Jiménez 15' (o.g.); Bakambu 20'; Castillejo 81'	Stadium: Salto del Caballo; Attendance: 4,200; Referee: Estrada Fernández

30 November 2016	Formentera	1–5	Sevilla	Sant Francesc Xavier
19:00	Gabri 26'	Report	Ben Yedder 1' (pen.), 74' (pen.); Correa 15', 29', 43'	Stadium: Municipal; Attendance: 2,416; Referee: Juan Martínez Munuera

30 November 2016	Guijuelo	0–6	Atlético Madrid	Villares de la Reina (Note: Guijuelo played their home match at El Helmántico, Salamanca, instead of their regular stadium Estadio Municipal, Guijuelo.)
21:00		Report	Saúl 29' (pen.); Vrsaljko 45'; Carrasco 49', 53'; Correa 57'; Roberto 85'	Stadium: El Helmántico; Attendance: 15,528; Referee: Undiano Mallenco

30 November 2016	UCAM Murcia	0–1	Celta Vigo	Murcia
21:00		Report	Gómez 42'	Stadium: La Condomina; Attendance: 5,103; Referee: Álvarez Izquierdo

30 November 2016	Córdoba	2–0	Málaga	Córdoba
21:00	Rodri 71'; Domínguez 83'	Report		Stadium: El Arcángel; Attendance: 6,217; Referee: Mateu Lahoz

30 November 2016	Granada	1–0	Osasuna	Granada
21:00	Toral 52'	Report		Stadium: Los Cármenes; Attendance: 8,872; Referee: Vicandi Garrido

30 November 2016	Hércules	1–1	Barcelona	Alicante
22:00	Mainz 52'	Report	Aleñá 58'	Stadium: José Rico Pérez; Attendance: 14,250; Referee: Ocón Arraiz

1 December 2016	Valladolid	1–3	Real Sociedad	Valladolid
20:00	Mata 14' (pen.)	Report	I. Martínez 7'; Juanmi 62', 74'	Stadium: José Zorrilla; Attendance: 7,280; Referee: Hernández Hernández

1 December 2016	Huesca	2–2	Las Palmas	Huesca
21:00	Camacho 65'; Aguilera 71'	Report	Asdrúbal 11' (pen.); Hernán 53'	Stadium: El Alcoraz; Attendance: 2,246; Referee: I. Iglesias Villanueva

1 December 2016	Gimnàstic	0–3	Alavés	Tarragona
21:00		Report	Toquero 15', 52'; Santos 63'	Stadium: Nou Estadi; Attendance: 3,032; Referee: Jaime Latre

1 December 2016	Racing Santander	1–2	Athletic Bilbao	Santander
22:00	Cobo 23'	Report	García 11', 28'	Stadium: El Sardinero; Attendance: 10,661; Referee: José Luis Munuera Montero

=== Second leg ===
30 November 2016	Real Madrid	6–1 (13–2 agg.)	Cultural Leonesa	Madrid
19:00	Mariano 1', 42', 87'; Rodríguez 23'; Enzo 63'; Morgado 90' (o.g.)	Report	Yeray 45'	Stadium: Santiago Bernabéu; Attendance: 47,656; Referee: Melero López

20 December 2016	Villarreal	1–1 (4–1 agg.)	Toledo	Villarreal
19:00	Pato 60'	Report	Villa 57'	Stadium: El Madrigal; Attendance: 12,157; Referee: Álvarez Izquierdo

20 December 2016	Real Sociedad	1–1 (4–2 agg.)	Valladolid	San Sebastián
20:00	Juanmi 12'	Report	González 44' (o.g.)	Stadium: Anoeta; Attendance: 13,161; Referee: Undiano Mallenco

20 December 2016	Atlético Madrid	4–1 (10–1 agg.)	Guijuelo	Madrid
21:00	Gaitán 17'; Correa 22'; Juanfran 29'; Torres 45'	Report	Pino 80'	Stadium: Vicente Calderón; Attendance: 23,478; Referee: Estrada Fernández

20 December 2016	Málaga	3–4 (3–6 agg.)	Córdoba	Málaga
21:00	Sandro 18', 39'; Santos 88'	Report	Piovaccari 28', 41'; Ríos 68' (pen.), 89'	Stadium: La Rosaleda; Attendance: 15,351; Referee: Ocón Arraiz

20 December 2016	Las Palmas	2–1 (4–3 agg.)	Huesca	Las Palmas
22:00 (21:00 UTC±0)	M. García 14'; Asdrúbal 60'	Report	Kilian 90'	Stadium: Gran Canaria; Attendance: 10,195; Referee: Mateu Lahoz

21 December 2016	Sevilla	9–1 (14–2 agg.)	Formentera	Seville
19:00	Ganso 14'; Vietto 22', 43', 45'; Ben Yedder 24', 55', 88'; Sarabia 27', 77'	Report	Gabri 61'	Stadium: Ramón Sánchez Pizjuán; Attendance: 10,930; Referee: Iglesias Villanueva

21 December 2016	Eibar	3–1 (5–2 agg.)	Sporting Gijón	Eibar
19:00	Kike 1', 46'; Adrián 44'	Report	Rubén 89'	Stadium: Ipurua; Attendance: 4,085; Referee: Gil Manzano

21 December 2016	Osasuna	2–0 (2–1 agg.)	Granada	Pamplona
21:00	Berenguer 45'; Romero 59'	Report		Stadium: El Sadar; Attendance: 9,464; Referee: Del Cerro Grande

21 December 2016	Valencia	2–1 (5–2 agg.)	Leganés	Valencia
21:00	Rodrigo 36', 89'	Report	Machís 49'	Stadium: Mestalla; Attendance: 22,041; Referee: Melero López

21 December 2016	Deportivo La Coruña	3–1 (3–2 agg.)	Real Betis	A Coruña
21:00	Arribas 11'; Luisinho 54'; Babel 59'	Report	Piccini 66'	Stadium: Riazor; Attendance: 17,145; Referee: González González

21 December 2016	Barcelona	7–0 (8–1 agg.)	Hércules	Barcelona
22:00	Digne 37'; Rakitić 45' (pen.); Rafinha 50'; Turan 55', 86', 89'; Alcácer 73'	Report		Stadium: Camp Nou; Attendance: 64,025; Referee: José Luis Munuera Montero

22 December 2016	Celta Vigo	1–0 (2–0 agg.)	UCAM Murcia	Vigo
20:00	Díaz 30'	Report		Stadium: Balaídos; Attendance: 9,161; Referee: Vicandi Garrido

22 December 2016	Alavés	3–0 (6–0 agg.)	Gimnàstic	Vitoria-Gasteiz
20:00	Édgar 12'; Sobrino 31' (pen.); Krstičić 40'	Report		Stadium: Mendizorrotza; Attendance: 11,043; Referee: Clos Gómez

22 December 2016	Athletic Bilbao	3–0 (5–1 agg.)	Racing Santander	Bilbao
21:00	Etxeita 17'; García 47'; Williams 72'	Report		Stadium: San Mamés; Attendance: 29,633; Referee: Trujillo Suárez

22 December 2016	Espanyol	1–1 (a.e.t.) (2–2 agg.) (3–4 p)	Alcorcón	Cornellà de Llobregat
21:00	H. Pérez 83'	Report	Álvaro 20'	Stadium: RCDE Stadium; Attendance: 9,143; Referee: Ricardo de Burgos Bengoetxea
	Penalties
	Piatti (penalty scored); Aarón (penalty scored); Gerard (penalty missed); H. Pérez (penalty scored); Jurado (penalty missed)		(penalty scored) Rodríguez; (penalty scored) V. Pérez; (penalty missed) Plano; (penalty scored) Samu; (penalty scored) Álvaro

== Round of 16 ==
Team 1	Agg.	Team 2	1st leg	2nd leg
Las Palmas (1)	3–4	Atlético Madrid (1)	0–2	3–2
Alcorcón (2)	2–1	Córdoba (2)	0–0	2–1
Athletic Bilbao (1)	3–4	Barcelona (1)	2–1	1–3
Real Madrid (1)	6–3	Sevilla (1)	3–0	3–3
Real Sociedad (1)	4–2	Villarreal (1)	3–1	1–1
Deportivo La Coruña (1)	3–3 (a)	Alavés (1)	2–2	1–1
Valencia (1)	2–6	Celta Vigo (1)	1–4	1–2
Osasuna (1)	0–3	Eibar (1)	0–3	0–0

=== First leg ===
3 January 2017	Valencia	1–4	Celta Vigo	Valencia
19:00	Parejo 58' (pen.)	Report	Aspas 3' (pen.); Bongonda 14'; Wass 19'; Guidetti 75'	Stadium: Mestalla; Attendance: 33,958; Referee: Estrada Fernández

3 January 2017	Osasuna	0–3	Eibar	Pamplona
19:00		Report	Nano 28'; Bebé 75'; Adrián 90'	Stadium: El Sadar; Attendance: 12,651; Referee: González González

3 January 2017	Las Palmas	0–2	Atlético Madrid	Las Palmas
21:15 (20:15 UTC±0)		Report	Koke 23'; Griezmann 51'	Stadium: Gran Canaria; Attendance: 26,032; Referee: Juan Martínez Munuera

3 January 2017	Deportivo La Coruña	2–2	Alavés	A Coruña
21:15	Gama 73'; Joselu (born 1990) 90+3'	Report	Santos 3'; Édgar 45' (pen.)	Stadium: Riazor; Attendance: 17,887; Referee: Hernández Hernández

4 January 2017	Alcorcón	0–0	Córdoba	Alcorcón
19:00		Report		Stadium: Santo Domingo; Attendance: 1,527; Referee: Prieto Iglesias

4 January 2017	Real Sociedad	3–1	Villarreal	San Sebastián
19:00	Willian José 17'; Vela 33'; Oyarzabal 72'	Report	Trigueros 77'	Stadium: Anoeta; Attendance: 16,414; Referee: Clos Gómez

4 January 2017	Real Madrid	3–0	Sevilla	Madrid
21:15	Rodríguez 11', 44' (pen.); Varane 29'	Report		Stadium: Santiago Bernabéu; Attendance: 78,969; Referee: Mateu Lahoz

5 January 2017	Athletic Bilbao	2–1	Barcelona	Bilbao
21:15	Aduriz 25'; Williams 28'	Report	Messi 52'	Stadium: San Mamés; Attendance: 45,772; Referee: Fernández Borbalán

=== Second leg ===
10 January 2017	Atlético Madrid	2–3 (4–3 agg.)	Las Palmas	Madrid
21:15	Griezmann 49'; Correa 61'	Report	Livaja 57', 89'; M. García 90+3'	Stadium: Vicente Calderón; Attendance: 21,357; Referee: José María Sánchez Martínez

11 January 2017	Córdoba	1–2 (1–2 agg.)	Alcorcón	Córdoba
19:00	Piovaccari 9'	Report	Rodríguez 51'; Alejo 68'	Stadium: Nuevo Arcángel; Attendance: 10,110; Referee: Alberola Rojas

11 January 2017	Villarreal	1–1 (2–4 agg.)	Real Sociedad	Villarreal
19:00	Soriano 45'	Report	Oyarzabal 15'	Stadium: La Cerámica; Attendance: 14,298; Referee: Fernández Borbalán

11 January 2017	Alavés	1–1 (3a–3 agg.)	Deportivo La Coruña	Vitoria-Gasteiz
19:00	Édgar 45'	Report	Arribas 62'	Stadium: Mendizorrotza; Attendance: 16,765; Referee: Estrada Fernández

11 January 2017	Barcelona	3–1 (4–3 agg.)	Athletic Bilbao	Barcelona
21:15	L. Suárez 35'; Neymar 48' (pen.); Messi 78'	Report	Saborit 51'	Stadium: Camp Nou; Attendance: 71,455; Referee: Gil Manzano

12 January 2017	Celta Vigo	2–1 (6–2 agg.)	Valencia	Vigo
19:00	Rossi 61'; Sisto 90+3'	Report	Araújo 63'	Stadium: Balaídos; Attendance: 9,970; Referee: Hernández Hernández

12 January 2017	Eibar	0–0 (3–0 agg.)	Osasuna	Eibar
19:00		Report		Stadium: Ipurua; Attendance: 3,627; Referee: Jaime Latre

12 January 2017	Sevilla	3–3 (3–6 agg.)	Real Madrid	Seville
21:15	Danilo 10' (o.g.); Jovetić 53'; Iborra 77'	Report	Asensio 48'; Ramos 83' (pen.); Benzema 90+3'	Stadium: Ramón Sánchez Pizjuán; Attendance: 36,943; Referee: Undiano Mallenco

== Quarter-finals ==
Team 1	Agg.	Team 2	1st leg	2nd leg
Real Sociedad (1)	2–6	Barcelona (1)	0–1	2–5
Alcorcón (2)	0–2	Alavés (1)	0–2	0–0
Atlético Madrid (1)	5–2	Eibar (1)	3–0	2–2
Real Madrid (1)	3–4	Celta Vigo (1)	1–2	2–2

=== First leg ===
18 January 2017	Alcorcón	0–2	Alavés	Alcorcón
19:15		Report	Ibai 90', 90+4'	Stadium: Santo Domingo; Attendance: 3,398; Referee: Álvarez Izquierdo

18 January 2017	Real Madrid	1–2	Celta Vigo	Madrid
21:15	Marcelo 69'	Report	Aspas 64'; Jonny 70'	Stadium: Santiago Bernabéu; Attendance: 58,196; Referee: Fernández Borbalán

19 January 2017	Atlético Madrid	3–0	Eibar	Madrid
19:15	Griezmann 28'; Correa 60'; Gameiro 68'	Report		Stadium: Vicente Calderón; Attendance: 24,826; Referee: Mateu Lahoz

19 January 2017	Real Sociedad	0–1	Barcelona	San Sebastián
21:15		Report	Neymar 21' (pen.)	Stadium: Anoeta; Attendance: 28,461; Referee: González González

=== Second leg ===
24 January 2017	Alavés	0–0 (2–0 agg.)	Alcorcón	Vitoria-Gasteiz
21:15		Report		Stadium: Mendizorrotza; Attendance: 11,287; Referee: Iglesias Villanueva

25 January 2017	Eibar	2–2 (2–5 agg.)	Atlético Madrid	Eibar
19:15	Enrich 73'; León 80'	Report	Giménez 49'; Juanfran 85'	Stadium: Ipurua; Attendance: 4,000; Referee: Jaime Latre

25 January 2017	Celta Vigo	2–2 (4–3 agg.)	Real Madrid	Vigo
21:15	Danilo 44' (o.g.); Wass 85'	Report	Ronaldo 62'; Vázquez 90'	Stadium: Balaídos; Attendance: 23,491; Referee: José María Sánchez Martínez

26 January 2017	Barcelona	5–2 (6–2 agg.)	Real Sociedad	Barcelona
21:15	D. Suárez 17', 82'; Messi 55' (pen.); L. Suárez 63'; Turan 80'	Report	Juanmi 62'; Willian José 73'	Stadium: Camp Nou; Attendance: 58,560; Referee: Juan Martínez Munuera

== Semi-finals ==
The draw for the semi-finals and final was held on 27 January 2017.

Team 1	Agg.	Team 2	1st leg	2nd leg
Celta Vigo	0–1	Alavés	0–0	0–1
Atlético Madrid	2–3	Barcelona	1–2	1–1

=== First leg ===
1 February 2017	Atlético Madrid	1–2	Barcelona	Madrid
21:00	Griezmann 59'	Report	L. Suárez 7'; Messi 33'	Stadium: Vicente Calderón; Attendance: 48,214; Referee: Ricardo de Burgos Bengoetxea

2 February 2017	Celta Vigo	0–0	Alavés	Vigo
21:00		Report		Stadium: Balaídos; Attendance: 18,989; Referee: González González

=== Second leg ===
7 February 2017	Barcelona	1–1 (3–2 agg.)	Atlético Madrid	Barcelona
21:00	L. Suárez 43'	Report	Gameiro 83'	Stadium: Camp Nou; Attendance: 67,734; Referee: Gil Manzano

8 February 2017	Alavés	1–0 (1–0 agg.)	Celta Vigo	Vitoria-Gasteiz
21:00	Édgar 82'	Report		Stadium: Mendizorrotza; Attendance: 19,307; Referee: Mateu Lahoz

== Final ==
The draw for the final was held on 27 January 2017.

27 May 2017
21:30 CEST

Barcelona	3–1	Alavés
Messi 30'; Neymar 45'; Alcácer 45+3'	Report	Hernandez 33'

Vicente Calderón, Madrid
Attendance: 45,000
Referee: Carlos Clos Gómez

== Top goalscorers ==
Rank	Player	Club	Goals
1	(France) Wissam Ben Yedder	Sevilla	5
1	(Argentina) Lionel Messi	Barcelona	5
3	(Argentina) Ángel Correa	Atlético Madrid	4
3	(Spain) Édgar	Alavés	4
3	(France) Antoine Griezmann	Atlético Madrid	4
3	(Spain) Juanmi	Real Sociedad	4
3	(Dominican Republic) Mariano	Real Madrid	4
3	(Italy) Federico Piovaccari	Córdoba	4
3	(Uruguay) Luis Suárez	Barcelona	4
3	(Turkey) Arda Turan	Barcelona	4
3	(Spain) Ander Vitoria	Barakaldo	4
