= 2017–18 Lorca FC season =

Lorca FC
2017–18 season
- Manager: Curro Torres
- Stadium: Francisco Artés Carrasco
- Segunda División: -
Home colours	Away colours

During the 2017–18 season, Lorca FC are participating in the Spanish LaLiga 1,2,3, and the Copa del Rey.

== Squad ==
As of 2 September 2017

Note: Flags indicate national team as defined under FIFA eligibility rules; some limited exceptions apply. Players may hold more than one non-FIFA nationality.

No.	Pos.	Nation	Player
1	GK	ESP	Jaume Valens
2	DF	ESP	Juan Pedro Pina (Captain)
3	DF	ESP	Carlos Pomares
4	DF	ESP	Fran Cruz
5	MF	ESP	Eugeni (on loan from Valencia)
6	MF	ESP	Haritz Albisua
7	MF	ESP	Carlos Martínez
8	MF	ESP	Tropi (on loan from Valencia)
9	FW	ESP	Chumbi
10	MF	ESP	Alberto Noguera
11	FW	ESP	Manuel Onwu
12	MF	ESP	Nando (on loan from Alavés)
13	GK	ESP	Francisco Dorronsoro
14	MF	ESP	Cristian Bustos

No.	Pos.	Nation	Player
15	DF	SWE	Markus Holgersson
16	MF	ESP	Sito (on loan from Valencia)
17	FW	ESP	Manel Martínez (on loan from Girona)
18	DF	ESP	Molo
19	FW	URU	Miguel Merentiel (on loan from Peñarol)
20	DF	ESP	Carlos Peña
21	FW	ESP	Dani Ojeda
22	MF	ESP	Adán Gurdiel
23	MF	ESP	Abel Gómez
24	MF	ESP	Javi Muñoz (on loan from Real Madrid)
25	GK	URU	Franco Torgnascioli
26	DF	ESP	José Carlos (on loan from Betis)
28	FW	NGR	Manu Apeh
—	DF	ESP	Antonio López

=== Transfers ===
- List of Spanish football transfers summer 2017#Lorca FC

==== In ====
Date	Player	From	Type	Fee	Ref
30 June 2017	(Spain) Samu Martínez	(Spain) Hospitalet	Loan return	Free	
30 June 2017	(Spain) Haritz Albisua	(Spain) Lleida Esportiu	Loan return	Free	
30 June 2017	(Spain) Mikel Fernández	(Spain) Lleida Esportiu	Loan return	Free	
6 July 2017	(Spain) Jaume Valens	(Spain) Mallorca B	Transfer	Free	
11 July 2017	(Spain) Tropi	(Spain) Valencia	Loan	Free	
14 July 2017	(Sweden) Markus Holgersson	(Denmark) AaB	Transfer	Free	
18 July 2017	(Spain) Adán Gurdiel	(Spain) Ponferradina	Transfer	Free	
19 July 2017	(Spain) Carlos Peña	(Spain) Getafe	Transfer	Free	
19 July 2017	(Spain) Javi Muñoz	(Spain) Real Madrid B	Loan	Free	
21 July 2017	(Spain) Fran Cruz	(Spain) Mirandés	Transfer	Free	
22 July 2017	(Uruguay) Franco Torgnascioli	(Mexico) Mineros de Zacatecas	Transfer	Free	
3 August 2017	(Uruguay) Miguel Merentiel	(Uruguay) Peñarol	Loan	Free	
5 August 2017	(Spain) Santi Luque	(Spain) Tenerife	Transfer	Free	

==== Out ====
Date	Player	To	Type	Fee	Ref
30 June 2017	(Brazil) Matheus Aias	(Spain) Granada B	Loan return	Free	
30 June 2017	(Nicaragua) Jaime Moreno	(Spain) Málaga B	Loan return	Free	
1 July 2017	(Spain) Sergio Menéndez	TBD		Free	
1 July 2017	(Chile) José Lafrentz	TBD		Free	
1 July 2017	(Spain) Samu Martínez	TBD		Free	
11 July 2017	(Spain) Borja Martínez	(Spain) Ebro	Transfer	Free	
21 July 2017	(Chile) José Rojas	(Chile) San Luis de Quillota	Transfer	Undisclosed	
1 August 2017	(Spain) Gonzalo Poley	(Spain) Cartagena	Transfer	Free	
5 August 2017	(Spain) Mikel Fernández	TBD		Free	
5 August 2017	(Spain) Urko Arroyo	TBD		Free	
5 August 2017	(Spain) Borja García	TBD		Free	

== Competitions ==
=== Overall ===
Competition	Final position
Segunda División	-
Copa del Rey	-

=== Liga ===
==== League table ====
Pos	Team	Pld	W	D	L	GF	GA	GD	Pts	Promotion, qualification or relegation
18	Almería	42	12	12	18	38	45	−7	48 (Note: Almería finished ahead of Cultural Leonesa on head-to head points: Cultural Leonesa 0–0 Almería, Almería 2–1 Cultural Leonesa)	
19	Cultural Leonesa (R)	42	11	15	16	54	67	−13	48	Relegation to Segunda División B
20	Barcelona B (R)	42	10	14	18	46	54	−8	44	Relegation to Segunda División B
21	Lorca FC (Note: Lorca were administratively relegated to the Tercera División due to financial difficulties.) (R)	42	8	9	25	37	68	−31	33	Demotion to Tercera División
22	Sevilla Atlético (R)	42	7	11	24	29	60	−31	32	Relegation to Segunda División B

Source: La Liga
Rules for classification: 1) points; 2) head-to-head points; 3) head-to-head goal difference; 4) goal difference; 5) number of goals scored
(R) Relegated

==== Matches ====
Kickoff times are in CET. Win Draw Loss

Match	Opponent	Venue	Result
1	Cultural	H	2–0
2	Huesca	A	2–0
3	Rayo	H	0–0
4	Almería	A	2–1
5	Reus	H	1–1
6	Sporting		–
7	Cádiz		–
8	Albacete		–
9	Zaragoza		–
10	Barcelona B		–
11	Tenerife		–
12	Granada		–
13	Córdoba		–
14	Alcorcón		–
15	Lugo		–
16	Nàstic		–
17	Oviedo		–
18	Numancia		–
19	Valladolid		–
20	Osasuna		–
21	Sevilla At		–

Match	Opponent	Venue	Result
22			–
23			–
24			–
25			–
26			–
27			–
28			–
29			–
30			–
31			–
32			–
33			–
34			–
35			–
36			–
37			–
38			–
39			–
40			–
41			–
42			–
