= 2012 Segunda División B play-offs =

Spanish football league play-offs

The 2012 Segunda División B play-offs (Playoffs de Ascenso or Promoción de Ascenso) were the final playoffs for promotion from 2011–12 Segunda División B to the 2012–13 Segunda División. The four first placed teams in each of the four Segunda División B groups played the Playoffs de Ascenso and the four last placed teams in Segunda División were relegated to Segunda División B. It also decided the two teams which placed 16th to be relegated to the 2012–13 Tercera División.

== Group Winners promotion play-off ==
=== Qualified teams ===
The draw was held in the RFEF headquarters, in Las Rozas (Madrid), on 14 May 2012, 16:30 CEST.

| Group | Team |
|---|---|
| 1 | Real Madrid Castilla |
| 2 | Mirandés |
| 3 | Atlético Baleares |
| 4 | Cádiz |

=== Matches ===
==== Semifinals ====
| Team 1 | Agg. | Team 2 | 1st leg | 2nd leg |
|---|---|---|---|---|
| Mirandés | 3–1 | Atlético Baleares | 1–0 | 2–1 |
| Cádiz | 1–8 | Real Madrid Castilla | 0–3 | 1–5 |

The aggregate winners were promoted and qualified to the 2011–12 Segunda División B Final. The aggregate losers were relegated to the Non-champions promotion play-off Second Round.

===== First leg =====
| 20 May 2012 | Mirandés | 1 – 0 | Atlético Baleares | Miranda de Ebro (Burgos) |
| 12:00 CEST | Mújika 50' | Report | | Stadium: Anduva; Attendance: 5,706; Referee: Luis Miguel Vallejo Aznar |

| 20 May 2012 | Cádiz | 0 – 3 | Real Madrid Castilla | Cádiz |
| 20:00 CEST | | Report | Joselu 16', 32'; Morata 81' | Stadium: Ramón de Carranza; Attendance: 19,000; Referee: David Jiménez Moreno |

===== Second leg =====
| 27 May 2012 | Atlético Baleares | 1 – 2 (1 – 3 agg.) | Mirandés | Palma |
| 10:30 CEST | Angulo 56' | Report | Infante 82' (pen.); David Sánchez 90' (o.g.) | Stadium: Balear; Attendance: 8,500; Referee: Juan Luis Pulido Santana |

| 27 May 2012 | Real Madrid Castilla | 5 – 1 (8 – 1 agg.) | Cádiz | Madrid |
| 12:00 CEST | Jesé 10'; Mosquera 38', 80'; Joselu 56'; Morata 83' | Report | de Coz 74' | Stadium: Alfredo di Stéfano; Attendance: 7,251; Referee: Sergio Usón Rosel |

Promoted to Segunda División
| Mirandés (First time ever) | Real Madrid Castilla (5 years later) |

==== Final ====
| Team 1 | Agg. | Team 2 | 1st leg | 2nd leg |
|---|---|---|---|---|
| Real Madrid Castilla | 6–0 | Mirandés | 3–0 | 3–0 |

===== First leg =====
| 1 June 2012 | Real Madrid Castilla | 3 – 0 | Mirandés | Madrid |
| 20:00 CEST | Joselu 43', 70'; Jesé 61' | Report | | Stadium: Alfredo di Stéfano; Attendance: 5,000; Referee: David Jesús Pinto Herrera |

===== Second leg =====
| 9 June 2012 | Mirandés | 0 – 3 (0 – 6 agg.) | Real Madrid Castilla | Miranda de Ebro (Burgos) |
| 18:50 CEST | | Report | Morata 4'; Joselu 42', 87' (pen.) | Stadium: Anduva |

Segunda División B
2011–12 Winners
Real Madrid Castilla

== Non-champions promotion play-off ==
=== First round ===
==== Qualified teams ====
The draw took place in the RFEF headquarters, in Las Rozas (Madrid), on 14 May 2012, 16:30 CEST.

| Group | Position | Team |
|---|---|---|
| 1 | 2nd | Tenerife |
| 2 | 2nd | Ponferradina |
| 3 | 2nd | Orihuela |
| 4 | 2nd | Linense |
| 1 | 3rd | Lugo |
| 2 | 3rd | Eibar |
| 3 | 3rd | Huracán Valencia |
| 4 | 3rd | Lucena |
| 1 | 4th | Albacete |
| 2 | 4th | Amorebieta |
| 3 | 4th | Badalona |
| 4 | 4th | Real Jaén |

==== Matches ====
| Team 1 | Agg. | Team 2 | 1st leg | 2nd leg |
|---|---|---|---|---|
| Albacete | 2–1 | Orihuela | 1–1 | 1–0 |
| Badalona | 2–4 | Tenerife | 1–1 | 1–3 |
| Amorebieta | 2–3 | Linense | 1–1 | 1–2 |
| Real Jaén | 2–3 | Ponferradina | 2–1 | 0–2 |
| Huracán Valencia | 0–0 (2–4 p) | Lucena | 0–0 | 0–0 (aet) |
| Lugo | 1–0 | Eibar | 1–0 | 0–0 |

===== First leg =====
| 19 May 2012 | Amorebieta | 1 – 1 | Linense | Amorebieta-Etxano (Biscay) |
| 18:30 CEST | Alberdi 41' | Report | Chico 3' | Stadium: Urritxe; Attendance: 2,000; Referee: Valentín Pizarro Gómez |

| 20 May 2012 | Huracán Valencia | 0 – 0 | Lucena | Manises (Valencia) |
| 18:00 CEST | | Report | | Stadium: Municipal de Manises; Attendance: 1,600; Referee: Víctor Pérez Peraza |

| 20 May 2012 | Lugo | 1 – 0 | Eibar | Lugo |
| 18:00 CEST | Belencoso 74' | Report | | Stadium: Anxo Carro; Attendance: 4,000; Referee: Adrián Cordero Vega |

| 20 May 2012 | Badalona | 1 – 1 | Tenerife | Badalona (Barcelona) |
| 18:30 CEST | Goikoetxea 45+1' | Report | Zazo 88' | Stadium: Camp del Centenari; Attendance: 2,500; Referee: Óscar Marín Álvarez |

| 20 May 2012 | Real Jaén | 2 – 1 | Ponferradina | Jaén |
| 20:00 CEST | Samuel 56' (o.g.); López 60' | Report | Acorán 69' | Stadium: Nuevo La Victoria; Attendance: 9,000; Referee: Francisco Villena Contreras |

| 20 May 2012 | Albacete | 1 – 1 | Orihuela | Albacete |
| 20:00 CEST | Granell 55' | Report | Espadas 25' | Stadium: Carlos Belmonte; Attendance: 8,112; Referee: Jorge Figueroa Vázquez |

===== Second leg =====
| 26 May 2012 | Eibar | 0 – 0 (0 – 1 agg.) | Lugo | Eibar (Gipuzkoa) |
| 20:15 CEST | | Report | | Stadium: Ipurua; Attendance: 2,616; Referee: Víctor Areces Franco |

| 26 May 2012 | Orihuela | 0 – 1 (1 – 2 agg.) | Albacete | Oriola (Alicante) |
| 21:00 CEST | | Report | Fleky 28' (o.g.) | Stadium: Los Arcos; Attendance: 4,000; Referee: Gustavo Rebollo López |

| 27 May 2012 | Tenerife | 3 – 1 (4 – 2 agg.) | Badalona | Santa Cruz de Tenerife |
| 17:30 WEST | Bravo 36'; Aridane 48'; Chechu 79' | Report | Ceballos 59' | Stadium: Heliodoro Rodríguez López; Attendance: 13,339; Referee: Hugo José López Puerta |

| 27 May 2012 | Lucena | 0 – 0 (a.e.t.) (0 – 0 agg.) (4 – 2 p) | Huracán Valencia | Lucena (Córdoba) |
| 18:30 CEST | | Report | | Stadium: Ciudad de Lucena; Attendance: 7,500; Referee: Alfonso Vicente Moral |
| | Penalties |
| | Lara (penalty scored); Armero (penalty missed) de la Cuesta (penalty scored); Lanza (penalty scored); Germán (penalty scored) | | (penalty missed) Amarilla; (penalty scored) Fas; (penalty scored) Omar; (penalty missed) Powell |

| 27 May 2012 | Linense | 2 – 1 (3 – 2 agg.) | Amorebieta | La Línea de la Concepción (Cádiz) |
| 19:00 CEST | Ocaña 40', 71' (pen.) | Report | Muñozguren 3' | Stadium: Municipal de La Línea; Attendance: 9,000; Referee: Francisco José Hernández Maeso |

| 27 May 2012 | Ponferradina | 2 – 0 (3 – 2 agg.) | Real Jaén | Ponferrada (León) |
| 20:00 CEST | Mateo 24'; Yuri 52' | | | Stadium: El Toralín; Attendance: 7,500; Referee: José Antonio López Toca |

=== Second round ===
==== Qualified teams ====
The draw was held in the RFEF headquarters, in Las Rozas (Madrid), on 28 May 2012, 17:00 CEST.

| Group | Position | Team | Notes |
|---|---|---|---|
| 3 | 1st | Atlético Baleares | Relegated from group winners promotion play-off |
| 4 | 1st | Cádiz | Relegated from group winners promotion play-off |
| 1 | 2nd | Tenerife | |
| 2 | 2nd | Ponferradina | |
| 4 | 2nd | Linense | |
| 1 | 3rd | Lugo | |
| 4 | 3rd | Lucena | |
| 1 | 4th | Albacete | |

==== Matches ====
| Team 1 | Agg. | Team 2 | 1st leg | 2nd leg |
|---|---|---|---|---|
| Albacete | 0–0 (3–4 p) | Cádiz | 0–0 | 0–0 (aet) |
| Lugo | 3–1 | Atlético Baleares | 3–1 | 0–0 |
| Lucena | 2–4 | Ponferradina | 2–1 | 0–3 |
| Linense | 2–4 | Tenerife | 0–1 | 2–3 |

===== First leg =====
| 2 June 2012 | Lucena | 2 – 1 | Ponferradina | Lucena (Córdoba) |
| 18:30 CEST | Vacas 42', 74' | Report | Yuri 33' | Stadium: Ciudad de Lucena; Attendance: 3,800; Referee: Carlos Alberto Carbonell Hernández |

| 3 June 2012 | Lugo | 3 – 1 | Atlético Baleares | Lugo |
| 12:00 CEST | Quero 17'; Belencoso 20'; Belforti 57' | Report | Dani 87' | Stadium: Anxo Carro; Attendance: 6,800; Referee: Carlos Sánchez Laso |

| 3 June 2012 | Linense | 0 – 1 | Tenerife | La Línea de la Concepción (Cádiz) |
| 19:00 CEST | | Report | Pagola 40' (o.g.) | Stadium: Municipal de La Línea; Attendance: 10,000; Referee: Alfonso Melgares De Aguilar Fernández |

| 3 June 2012 | Albacete | 0 – 0 | Cádiz | Albacete |
| 20:00 CEST | | Report | | Stadium: Carlos Belmonte; Attendance: 10,581; Referee: Pablo González Fuertes |

===== Second leg =====
| 9 June 2012 | Ponferradina | 3 – 0 (4 – 2 agg.) | Lucena | Ponferrada (León) |
| 21:00 CEST | Yuri 10'; Acorán 53'; Dídac 90' | Report | | Stadium: El Toralín; Attendance: 7,000; Referee: Iosu Galech Apezteguía |

| 9 June 2012 | Cádiz | 0 – 0 (a.e.t.) (0 – 0 agg.) (4 – 3 p) | Albacete' | Cádiz |
| 21:30 CEST | | Report | | Stadium: Ramón de Carranza; Attendance: 10,958; Referee: David Pérez Pallas |
| | Penalties |
| | Ferreiro (penalty scored); Murillo (penalty missed); Dioni (penalty scored); Óscar Pérez (penalty scored); Yuste (penalty scored) | | (penalty missed) Núñez; (penalty scored) Molina; (penalty scored) Calle; (penalty missed) Curto; (penalty scored) Álex Colorado |

| 10 June 2012 | Atlético Baleares | 0 – 0 (1 – 3 agg.) | Lugo | Palma |
| 12:00 CEST | | | | Stadium: Balear; Attendance: 9,000; Referee: Julio Fermín Leo Ollo |

| 10 June 2012 | Tenerife | 3 – 2 (4 – 2 agg.) | Linense | Santa Cruz de Tenerife |
| 12:00 WEST | Kike 2'; Bravo 40' | | Hernández 17' | Stadium: Heliodoro Rodríguez López; Attendance: 14,329; Referee: Aitor Gorostegui Fernández-Ortega |

=== Third round ===
==== Qualified teams ====
The draw was held in the RFEF headquarters, in Las Rozas (Madrid), on 11 June 2012, 17:00 CEST.

| Group | Position | Team |
|---|---|---|
| 4 | 1st | Cádiz |
| 1 | 2nd | Tenerife |
| 2 | 2nd | Ponferradina |
| 1 | 3rd | Lugo |

==== Matches ====
| Team 1 | Agg. | Team 2 | 1st leg | 2nd leg |
|---|---|---|---|---|
| Lugo | 4–4 (3–2 p) | Cádiz | 3–1 | 1–3 (aet) |
| Ponferradina | 3–1 | Tenerife | 1–0 | 2–1 |

===== First leg =====
| 17 June 2012 | Lugo | 3 – 1 | Cádiz | Lugo |
| 19:00 CEST | Pita 12'; Belencoso 33'; Quero 68' | Report | Óscar Pérez 81' | Stadium: Anxo Carro; Attendance: 6,000; Referee: José Ignacio Hernández Cifuentes |

| 17 June 2012 | Ponferradina | 1 – 0 | Tenerife | Ponferrada (León) |
| 20:00 CEST | Yuri 44' | Report | | Stadium: El Toralín; Attendance: 8,000; Referee: Javier Iglesias Villanueva |

===== Second leg =====
| 24 June 2012 | Tenerife | 1 – 2 (1 – 3 agg.) | Ponferradina | Santa Cruz de Tenerife |
| 12:00 WEST | Kiko Ratón 89' | Report | Yuri 49'; Didac 69' | Stadium: Heliodoro Rodríguez López; Attendance: 18,714; Referee: Vicente Gil Coscolla |

| 24 June 2012 | Cádiz | 3 – 1 (a.e.t.) (4 – 4 agg.) (2 – 3 p) | Lugo | Cádiz |
| 19:00 CEST | Ferreiro 13'; Dioni 46'; Juanjo 63' | Report | Monti 29' | Stadium: Ramón de Carranza; Attendance: 15,500; Referee: Ignacio Hermosilla Alaña |
| | Penalties |
| | Ferreiro (penalty scored); Góngora (penalty scored); Akinsola (penalty missed); Cases (penalty missed); Yuste (penalty missed) | | (penalty scored) Pita; (penalty missed) Belforti; (penalty scored) Luismi; (penalty missed) Berodia; (penalty scored) Manu |

Promoted to Segunda División
| Ponferradina (1 year later) | Lugo (19 years later) |

== Relegation play-off ==
=== Qualified teams ===
The draw was held in the RFEF headquarters, in Las Rozas (Madrid), on 14 May 2012, 16:30 CEST.

| Group | Team |
|---|---|
| 1 | Conquense |
| 2 | Palencia |
| 3 | Zaragoza B |
| 4 | Lorca Atlético |

=== Matches ===
| Team 1 | Agg. | Team 2 | 1st leg | 2nd leg |
|---|---|---|---|---|
| Zaragoza B | 4–0 | Conquense | 1–0 | 3–0 |
| Palencia | 3–1 | Lorca Atlético | 2–0 | 1–1 |

==== First leg ====
| 19 May 2012 | Zaragoza B | 1 – 0 | Conquense | Zaragoza |
| 20:00 CEST | Fran González 87' | Report | | Stadium: La Romareda; Attendance: 4,000; Referee: David Medie Jiménez |

| 20 May 2012 | Palencia | 2 – 0 | Lorca Atlético | Palencia |
| 19:00 CEST | Jandro 50'; Durántez 63' | Report | | Stadium: Nueva Balastera; Attendance: 3,000; Referee: Gorka Sagués Oscoz |

==== Second leg ====
| 27 May 2012 | Conquense | 0 – 3 (0 – 4 agg.) | Zaragoza B | Cuenca |
| 18:00 CEST | | Report | Jorge 23'; Carreño 34'; Montero 86' | Stadium: La Fuensanta; Referee: Alonso Vizuete Sánchez |

| 27 May 2012 | Lorca Atlético | 1 – 1 (1 – 3 agg.) | Palencia | Lorca (Murcia) |
| 19:30 CEST | Campillo 44' | Report | Carril 89' | Stadium: Francisco Artés Carrasco; Referee: Iván González González |

Relegated to Tercera División
| Conquense | Lorca Atlético |

== See also ==
- 2011–12 Segunda División B
- 2012 Tercera División play-offs
- 2012–13 Segunda División B
