= Chechu =

Chechu is a nickname used in Spanish-speaking countries, which may refer to:

- Francisco Javier Flores Gómez (born 1982), Spanish footballer
- Jesús Sánchez López (born 1996), Spanish footballer
- José Biriukov (born 1963), Spanish and Soviet retired basketball player
- José Antonio Dorado (born 1982), Spanish footballer
- José Francisco Rojo (born 1947), Spanish retired footballer and coach
- José Luis Rubiera (born 1973), Spanish former professional road bicycle racer
