= Curro =

Curro is an Andalusian diminutive of the male name Francisco.

== People with the given name ==
- Curro (footballer, born 1981) (Antonio José González García), Spanish footballer
- Curro Montoya (born 1977), Spanish footballer
- Curro Romero (born 1933), Spanish bullfighter
- Curro Sánchez (born 1996), Spanish footballer
- Curro Savoy (born 1948), Spanish musician
- Curro Torres (born 1976), Spanish footballer
- Curro Vacas (born 1979), Spanish footballer

== People with the surname ==
- Jeff Curro (born 1967), American radio personality
- John Curro (1932–2019), Australian violist, conductor, and music director
- Tracey Curro (born 1963), Australian journalist

== Commerce ==
- Curro Holdings, a major South African private education provider

== Other ==
- Curro Jiménez, a Spanish television drama series
- Curro (mascot), the Seville Expo '92 mascot
