= Jorge Pérez (footballer) =

Spanish footballer

Personal information
- Full name: Jorge Pérez Saénz
- Date of birth: 24 October 1975 (age 51)
- Place of birth: Bilbao, Spain
- Height: 1.75 m (5 ft 9 in)
- Position: Midfielder

Senior career*
Years	Team	Apps	(Gls)
1994–1996	Zamudio		
1996–1997	Aurrerá	35	(4)
1997–1998	Bilbao Athletic	20	(4)
1997–1999	Athletic Bilbao	16	(0)
1999–2000	Numancia	10	(0)
2000–2002	Extremadura	72	(5)
2002–2004	Almería	63	(4)
2004–2005	Córdoba	6	(0)
2005	Conquense	13	(2)
2005–2008	Lorca Deportiva	29	(0)
2008–2009	Roquetas	52	(9)
2009–2010	Caravaca	27	(5)
2010–2011	Lorca Deportiva		
2011	Lorca Atlético	14	(2)
2011–2012	Atlético Pulpileño		
Total		357	(35)

Managerial career
- 2016–2018: Lorca B
- 2017: Lorca (interim)
- 2018: Tenerife (assistant)
- 2019–2021: Bilbao Athletic (assistant)
- 2022–2023: Mirandés (assistant)
- 2023–2025: Eibar (assistant)
- 2025–2026: Cultural Leonesa (assistant)
- * Club domestic league appearances and goals

Jorge Pérez Sáenz (born 24 October 1975) is a Spanish retired footballer who played as a central midfielder, and a manager.

He amassed Segunda División totals of 165 matches and nine goals over seven seasons, with Extremadura, Almería, Córdoba and Lorca Deportiva. In La Liga, he appeared for Athletic Bilbao and Numancia (26 games).

== Playing career ==
Born in Bilbao, Biscay, Pérez made his senior debut with Zamudio SD in Tercera División. After a one-year spell with CD Aurrerá de Vitoria, he joined Athletic Bilbao; initially assigned to the reserves in Segunda División B, his first La Liga match with the first team occurred on 15 February 1998 when came on as a 52nd-minute substitute for Mikel Lasa in a 0–3 home loss against Valencia CF; he scored his only goal for them in the penultimate group stage fixture of the 1998–99 UEFA Champions League, a 2–1 away defeat to Rosenborg BK.

In 1999, Pérez moved to another top-flight club, CD Numancia. The following year, he signed for CF Extremadura of the Segunda División.

In the summer of 2002, Pérez joined UD Almería still in the second division. After being ever-present during the 2003–04 season, he agreed to a contract at Córdoba CF.

Following a six-month spell at third-tier side UB Conquense, Pérez signed with Lorca Deportiva CF one level above in July 2006. After suffering relegation he took his game to the lower leagues, representing in quick succession CD Roquetas, Caravaca CF, Lorca Deportiva, Lorca Atlético CF and CA Pulpileño; at the age of 36, he retired.

== Coaching career ==
On 15 September 2016, Pérez became manager of Lorca FC's reserves. On 17 December of the following year, after the dismissal of Curro Torres, he was named caretaker of the first team; he was in charge for one match before the appointment of Fabri, and returned to his previous role.

On 5 July 2018, Pérez joined Joseba Etxeberria's coaching staff at CD Tenerife.
