= Emmanuel Apeh =

Nigerian footballer (born 1996)

Manu Apeh
Personal information
- Full name: Emmanuel Apeh
- Date of birth: 25 October 1996 (age 30)
- Place of birth: Kaduna, Nigeria
- Height: 1.80 m (5 ft 11 in)
- Position: Striker

Team information
- Current team: F.C. Kiryat Yam
- Number: 99

Youth career
- SamVic Academy

Senior career*
Years	Team	Apps	(Gls)
2015–2016	Alcalá B	12	(10)
2016	Alcalá	9	(4)
2016–2017	Lorca B	37	(27)
2016–2018	Lorca	30	(3)
2018–2020	Celta B	47	(19)
2019	Celta	2	(0)
2020–2022	Tenerife	39	(1)
2022	→ Alcorcón (loan)	17	(2)
2022–2024	Sabah	65	(11)
2024–2025	Al Ittihad	18	(2)
2025–	F.C. Kiryat Yam	12	(3)
- * Club domestic league appearances and goals as of 24 June 2026

Emmanuel "Manu" Apeh (born 25 October 1996) is a Nigerian footballer who plays as a striker for Liga Leumit club F.C. Kiryat Yam.

== Club career ==
Born in Kaduna, Apeh was a SamVic Academy youth graduate, and had a failed trial at Inter Milan in August 2014. He made his senior debut with RSD Alcalá's reserve team in 2015, in the regional leagues.

Apeh made his first team debut on 24 March 2016, coming on as a half-time substitute in a 1–5 Tercera División away loss against CD San Fernando de Henares. Three days later he scored his first goal, netting the last in a 2–0 home win against AD Parla.

In July 2016, after scoring four goals in nine matches, Apeh was definitely promoted to Alcalá's main squad; however, he subsequently moved to Lorca FC's B-team also in the fourth division. He made his first team debut for the latter on 17 September, replacing Manuel Onwu in a 1–0 away win against Granada CF B in the Segunda División B championship.

In April 2017, ahead of a match against Linares Deportivo, Apeh opted not to tell his father's death to his club, and still travelled and played with the senior and the reserve squads. In August, after his team's promotion to Segunda División, he was definitely promoted to the main squad by new manager Curro Torres.

Apeh made his professional debut on 18 August 2017, coming on as a late substitute for Manel Martínez in a 2–0 home win against Cultural y Deportiva Leonesa; he also provided the assist for Carlos Martínez's last goal. He scored his first professional goal on 21 October, netting his team's second in a 2–2 home draw against CD Tenerife.

On 11 July 2018, Apeh joined Celta de Vigo B in the third division. He made his first team – and La Liga – debut the following 27 January, replacing Jozabed in a 1–2 away loss against Real Valladolid.

On 5 August 2020, Apeh agreed to a three-year deal with CD Tenerife in the second level. On 26 January 2022, after being rarely used during the first half of the campaign, he moved on loan to fellow league team AD Alcorcón until June.

On 18 July 2022, Sabah announced the signing of Apeh to a two-year contract.
