= Javier Pérez =

Javier or Xavier Pérez may refer to:

== Sports ==
=== Association football (soccer) ===
- Javier Pérez (football manager) (born 1977), Spanish soccer coach
- Xavi Pérez (born 1984), Spanish football defender
- Javi Pérez (footballer, born 1986), Spanish football midfielder
- Javi Pérez (footballer, born 1995), Spanish football midfielder
- Javi Pérez (footballer, born 1996), Spanish football midfielder

=== Other sports ===
- Javier Pérez (baseball) (1902–?), Cuban baseball player
- Xavier Pérez (born 1968), Andorran cyclist
- Javier Pérez (basketball) (born 1970), Spanish basketball player
- Javier Pérez (taekwondo) (born 1996), Spanish taekwondo athlete

== Others ==
- Javier Pérez de Cuéllar (1920–2020), Peruvian politician, United Nations Secretary-General
- Javier Perez-Capdevila (born 1963), Cuban scientist
- Javier Pérez Andújar (born 1965), Spanish novelist and columnist
- Javier Pérez (artist) (born 1968), Spanish visual artist
- Javier Pérez-Ramírez (born 1974), Spanish chemistry professor
- Javier Perez-Tenessa, Mexican entrepreneur

== See also ==
- Javier Peres (born 1972), art dealer
