= Víctor Bravo =

Víctor Bravo may refer to:

- Víctor Bravo Ahuja (1918–1990), Mexican politician and first Rector of ITESM
- Víctor Bravo (footballer) (born 1983), Spanish footballer
