= Samu Martínez =

Spanish footballer

- Samu Martínez in 2016

Personal information
- Full name: José Samuel Martínez Lorente
- Date of birth: 15 April 1994 (age 32)
- Place of birth: Aspe, Spain
- Height: 1.72 m (5 ft 8 in)
- Position: Midfielder

Team information
- Current team: Cieza

Youth career
- Elche

Senior career*
Years	Team	Apps	(Gls)
2012–2015	Elche B	87	(8)
2014–2016	Elche	7	(0)
2016	→ Reus (loan)	5	(0)
2016–2017	Lorca	2	(0)
2017	→ Hospitalet (loan)	11	(1)
2017–2019	Novelda	22	(8)
2019	Mérida	9	(1)
2019–2020	Lorca Deportiva	24	(5)
2020–2021	Arandina	26	(2)
2021–2023	Ciudad de Murcia	57	(11)
2023–2024	Deportiva Minera	26	(4)
2024–	Cieza	6	(2)
- * Club domestic league appearances and goals as of 13 October 2024

José Samuel Martínez Lorente (born 15 April 1994), better known as Samu Martínez or just Samu, is a Spanish footballer who plays for Cieza as a midfielder.

== Football career ==
Samu was born in Aspe, Province of Alicante. A product of local Elche CF's youth system, he made his senior debuts with the reserves in the 2011–12 campaign.

On 18 May 2014 Samu played his first match as a professional, coming on as a late substitute in a 1–3 La Liga loss at Sevilla FC. On 29 January 2016, he renewed his contract until 2017, being immediately loaned to CF Reus Deportiu in Segunda División B.

On 2 August 2016, Samu rescinded his contract with the Franjiverdes, and signed for Lorca FC the following day.
