= Willy Ledesma =

Spanish footballer

Willy
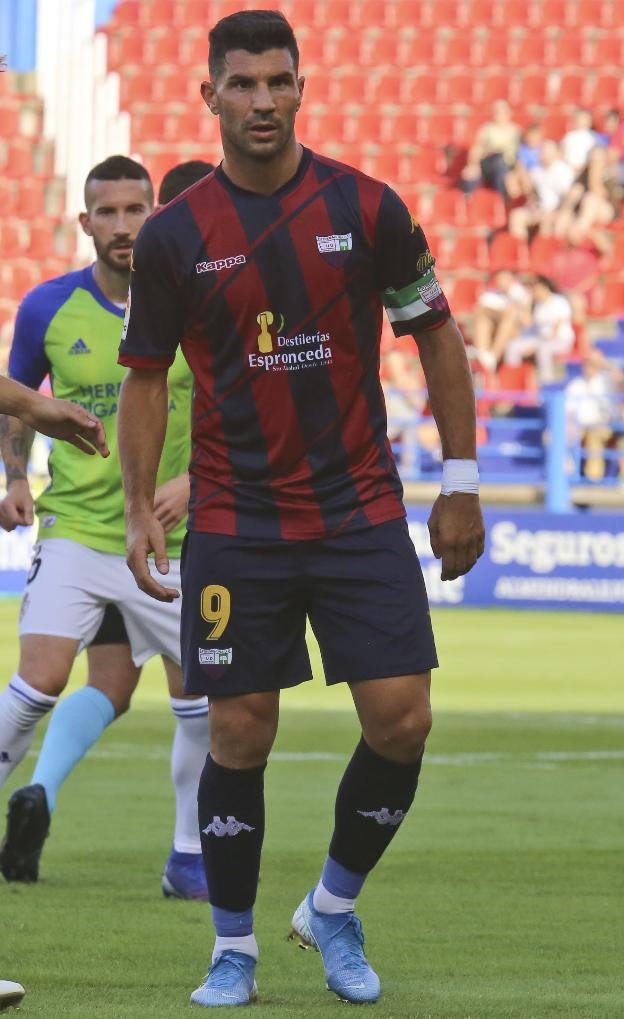
- Willy with Extremadura in 2019

Personal information
- Full name: Luis Alfonso Ledesma Gallán
- Date of birth: 23 January 1989 (age 37)
- Place of birth: Torremejía, Spain
- Height: 1.85 m (6 ft 1 in)
- Position: Striker

Youth career
- CF Extremadura
- 2008: Rayo Vallecano

Senior career*
Years	Team	Apps	(Gls)
2006–2008	CF Extremadura	4	(0)
2008–2009	Rayo Vallecano B		
2009–2011	Betis C	78	(24)
2010	Betis B	1	(0)
2011–2013	Villanovense	69	(15)
2013–2014	Arroyo	15	(1)
2014–2020	Extremadura	171	(73)
2020–2023	Córdoba	91	(35)
2023–2025	Lugo	33	(9)
- * Club domestic league appearances and goals

Luis Alfonso Ledesma Galán (born 23 January 1989), commonly known as Willy, is a Spanish former professional footballer who played as a striker.

== Club career ==
Willy was born in Torremejía, Badajoz, Extremadura, and made his senior debut with CF Extremadura on 22 October 2006 at the age of just 17, starting in a 1–0 Segunda División B away win against CD Alcalá. In January 2008 he moved to Rayo Vallecano, initially returning to youth football.

After playing for Rayo's B-team Willy joined Real Betis, representing the latter's C and B-teams. On 5 August 2011, he signed for CF Villanovense in the third division, after impressing on a trial basis.

On 22 June 2013, Willy agreed to a contract with Arroyo CP, still in the third division. Roughly one year later he signed for Extremadura UD in Tercera División, scoring a career-best 29 goals during the 2015–16 campaign as his side achieved promotion to the third division.

Willy subsequently became team captain, and contributed with nine goals in 33 appearances (play-offs included) in 2017–18, as his side achieved a first-ever promotion to Segunda División. On 19 August 2018, aged 29, he made his professional debut by coming on as a second-half substitute for Samu Manchón in a 1–1 away draw against Real Oviedo.

Willy scored his first professional goal on 3 November 2018, netting his team's second in a 2–4 loss at Córdoba CF. On 21 January 2020, he cut ties with the Azulgranas, and signed a 18-month contract with Córdoba CF in the third division two days later.
