= Gabri (footballer, born 1985) =

Spanish footballer

Personal information
- Full name: Gabriel Gómez Román
- Date of birth: 3 September 1985 (age 41)
- Place of birth: Barcelona, Spain
- Height: 1.74 m (5 ft 9 in)
- Position: Forward

Youth career
- Alavés

Senior career*
Years	Team	Apps	(Gls)
2002–2006	Alavés B	57	(10)
2005	→ Haro (loan)	12	(0)
2006–2008	Alavés	41	(4)
2007	→ Osasuna B (loan)	15	(1)
2008–2009	Girona	34	(4)
2010	Espanyol B	17	(6)
2010–2011	San Roque	35	(6)
2011–2012	Eibar	31	(1)
2012–2013	Badalona	25	(3)
2014	Sant Andreu	3	(1)
2014–2015	Burgos	33	(3)
2015–2016	Leioa	27	(1)
2016–2018	Formentera	71	(13)
2018–2019	Ordino	11	(2)
2019	Logroñés	20	(4)
2019	Silla	12	(1)
2019–2023	Portmany	90	(5)
Total		534	(65)
- * Club domestic league appearances and goals

Gabriel Gómez Román (born 3 September 1985 in Barcelona, Catalonia), known as Gabri, is a Spanish former professional footballer who played as a forward.
