= Lorca FC B =

- Full name: Lorca Fútbol Club, S.A.D. "B"
- Nickname(s): El Brócoli Mecánico (The Clockwork Broccoli)
- Founded: 2012
- Dissolved: 2020
- Ground: Los Tollos; Lorca, Murcia, Spain
- Owner: Xu Genbao
- Chairman: Luis Jiménez
- Manager: Jorge Pérez
- 2019–20: Segunda Autonómica, 16th of 18
Home colours	Away colours

Lorca Fútbol Club "B" was a Spanish football team based in La Hoya, a hamlet of Lorca, in the autonomous community of Murcia. Founded in 2012, it was the reserve team of Lorca FC, holding home games at Campo de Fútbol Los Tollos.

== History ==
Founded in 2012 as La Hoya Lorca CF's reserve team, the club achieved an immediate promotion to Primera Regional de Murcia as champions, but only reached the Preferente category in the 2015–16 campaign, which also ended in promotion. After the club's name change to Lorca FC, the B-side also became Lorca FC B, and reached the play-offs in their debut season in Tercera División.

== Season to season ==
Season	Tier	Division	Place
2012–13	7	2ª Aut.	2nd
2013–14	6	1ª Aut.	11th
2014–15	6	1ª Aut.	2nd
2015–16	5	Pref. Aut.	2nd
2016–17	4	3ª	2nd
2017–18	4	3ª	13th
2018–19	DNP		
2019–20	7	2ª Aut.	16th

- 2 seasons in Tercera División

== Squad ==
As of 3 February 2018

Note: Flags indicate national team as defined under FIFA eligibility rules; some limited exceptions apply. Players may hold more than one non-FIFA nationality.

No.	Pos.	Nation	Player
—	GK	(Spain) ESP	Jesús
—	GK	(Spain) ESP	Juampe
—	DF	(Argentina) ARG	Lucas Alonso
—	DF	(Spain) ESP	Iván Gimeno
—	DF	(Spain) ESP	Pedro Ángel
—	DF	(Spain) ESP	Ramiro Marín
—	DF	(Spain) ESP	Rubio
—	DF	(Spain) ESP	Álex Malón
—	DF	(Spain) ESP	Cayu
—	MF	(Spain) ESP	Adri

No.	Pos.	Nation	Player
—	MF	(Spain) ESP	Albert
—	MF	(Spain) ESP	Daniel García
—	MF	(Spain) ESP	Jaime
—	MF	(Spain) ESP	Javi Valencia
—	MF	(Spain) ESP	Javier Vera
—	MF	(Spain) ESP	Raúl Aranda
—	MF	(Spain) ESP	Vicen
—	FW	(Chile) CHI	Manuel Avello
—	FW	(Nigeria) NGA	Manu Apeh
—	FW	(Spain) ESP	Germán Rabasco
