= CE Banyoles =

Association football club in Spain

Banyoles
- Full name: Club Esportiu Banyoles
- Founded: 1913
- Ground: Nou Municipal, Banyoles, Catalonia, Spain
- Capacity: 4,000
- Chairman: Pau Teixidor i Romans
- Manager: Adam Fontes
- League: Segona Catalana
- 2025–26: Primera Catalana – Group 1, 15th of 16 (relegated)
Home colours	Away colours

Club Esportiu Banyoles is a Spanish football club based in the city of Banyoles, in the autonomous community of Catalonia. Founded in 1913, they play in Primera Catalana, holding home games at Estadi Nou Municipal, which has a capacity of 4,000 spectators.

== History ==
Club logo until 2013

Club Deportiu Banyoles was founded on 15 August 1913 by Francesc Xavier Ballestero Pérez, changing name to Centre d'Esports Banyoles in 1925. In 1942, after the Spanish Civil War, the club was renamed to Club Deportivo Bañolas due to the prohibitions of non-Spanish names, and they achieved their first-ever promotion to Tercera División in 1957.

Relegated in 1959, the club only returned to Tercera División in 1982, now the fourth level after the establishment of Segunda División B. They returned to their first name CD Banyoles in 1984, but were again renamed in 2013, their centenary year, to Club Esportiu Banyoles.

== Season to season ==
Season	Tier	Division	Place	Copa del Rey
1929–1943	—	Regional	—	
1943–44	6	2ª Reg.	5th	
1944–45	5	1ª Reg. B	3rd	
1945–46	5	1ª Reg. B	3rd	
1946–47	6	3ª Reg.	7th	
1947–48	6	2ª Reg.	9th	
1948–49	6	2ª Reg.	1st	
1949–50	5	1ª Reg. B	7th	
1950–51	5	1ª Reg. B	13th	
1951–52	5	1ª Reg. B	14th	
1952–53	6	2ª Reg.	2nd	
1953–54	5	2ª Reg.	4th	
1954–55	5	2ª Reg.	2nd	
1955–56	5	2ª Reg.	4th	
1956–57	4	1ª Reg.	1st	
1957–58	3	3ª	11th	
1958–59	3	3ª	13th	
1959–60	4	1ª Reg.	6th	
1960–61	4	1ª Reg.	15th	
1961–62	4	1ª Reg.	9th	

Season	Tier	Division	Place	Copa del Rey
1962–63	4	1ª Reg.	10th	
1963–64	4	1ª Reg.	16th	
1964–65	4	1ª Reg.	11th	
1965–66	4	1ª Reg.	16th	
1966–67	4	1ª Reg.	20th	
1967–68	5	2ª Reg.	2nd	
1968–69	5	1ª Reg.	2nd	
1969–70	5	1ª Reg.	1st	
1970–71	4	Reg. Pref.	10th	
1971–72	4	Reg. Pref.	10th	
1972–73	4	Reg. Pref.	20th	
1973–74	5	1ª Reg.	10th	
1974–75	5	1ª Reg.	18th	
1975–76	6	2ª Reg.	4th	
1976–77	6	2ª Reg.	2nd	
1977–78	6	1ª Reg.	8th	
1978–79	6	1ª Reg.	5th	
1979–80	6	1ª Reg.	8th	
1980–81	6	1ª Reg.	1st	
1981–82	5	Reg. Pref.	1st	

Season	Tier	Division	Place	Copa del Rey
1982–83	4	3ª	6th	
1983–84	4	3ª	9th	First round
1984–85	4	3ª	5th	
1985–86	4	3ª	8th	Second round
1986–87	4	3ª	9th	
1987–88	4	3ª	14th	
1988–89	4	3ª	10th	
1989–90	4	3ª	15th	
1990–91	4	3ª	3rd	
1991–92	4	3ª	17th	Second round
1992–93	5	1ª Cat.	9th	
1993–94	5	1ª Cat.	5th	
1994–95	4	3ª	13th	
1995–96	4	3ª	11th	
1996–97	4	3ª	14th	
1997–98	4	3ª	10th	
1998–99	4	3ª	10th	
1999–2000	4	3ª	16th	
2000–01	4	3ª	20th	
2001–02	5	1ª Cat.	7th	

Season	Tier	Division	Place	Copa del Rey
2002–03	5	1ª Cat.	2nd	
2003–04	4	3ª	12th	
2004–05	4	3ª	19th	
2005–06	5	1ª Cat.	13th	
2006–07	5	1ª Cat.	4th	
2007–08	4	3ª	9th	
2008–09	4	3ª	20th	
2009–10	5	1ª Cat.	19th	
2010–11	6	Pref. Terr.	14th	
2011–12	6	2ª Cat.	6th	
2012–13	6	2ª Cat.	1st	
2013–14	5	1ª Cat.	8th	
2014–15	5	1ª Cat.	17th	
2015–16	6	2ª Cat.	3rd	
2016–17	6	2ª Cat.	1st	
2017–18	5	1ª Cat.	13th	
2018–19	5	1ª Cat.	3rd	
2019–20	4	3ª	17th	
2020–21	4	3ª	11th / 5th	
2021–22	6	1ª Cat.	10th	

Season	Tier	Division	Place	Copa del Rey
2022–23	6	1ª Cat.	10th	
2023–24	7	1ª Cat.	11th	
2024–25	7	1ª Cat.	8th	
2025–26	7	1ª Cat.		

- 25 seasons in Tercera División

== Notable players ==
- (Spain) Ferran Corominas
- (Spain) Andreu Fontàs
- (Spain) Albert Serra
- (Spain) Chechu
