= CD Guijuelo =

Association football team in Spain

Coordinates: 40.546977°N 5.673226°W

Guijuelo
- Full name: Club Deportivo Guijuelo
- Nickname: Chacineros
- Founded: 1974; 52 years ago
- Stadium: Estadio Municipal de Guijuelo
- Capacity: 1,500
- President: Goyo Llorente
- Head coach: Ruben Gala
- League: Tercera Federación – Group 8
- 2025–26: Tercera Federación – Group 8, 2nd of 18
- Website: clubdeportivoguijuelo.com
Home colours	Away colours

Club Deportivo Guijuelo is a Spanish football team based in Guijuelo, Province of Salamanca, in the autonomous community of Castile and León. Founded in 1974 it plays in Tercera Federación – Group 8, holding home games at the 1,500-seat Estadio Municipal de Guijuelo.

== History ==
In mid-July 1974 C.D. Guijuelo presented the first club's Board of Directors. One of the first actions was improvement of the club's infrastructure which they had the cooperation with the City Council for. Another important step was the inscription of the team in the Football Federation, achieved by the efforts of Damián Martín Barriguete and Cesar Picado de la Iglesia.

On October 12, 2016 for the first time in its history Guijuelo reached the round of 32 of the Copa del Rey by winning away game against CA Cirbonero 2:1.

== Season to season ==
Season	Tier	Division	Place	Copa del Rey
1974–75	6	2ª Reg.		
1975–76	6	2ª Reg.		
1976–77	6	2ª Reg.	4th	
1977–78	7	2ª Reg.	2nd	
1978–79	6	1ª Reg.		
1979–80	6	1ª Reg.	18th	
1980–81	7	2ª Reg.	1st	
1981–82	6	1ª Reg.	10th	
1982–83	6	1ª Reg.	8th	
1983–84	6	1ª Reg.		
1984–85	6	1ª Reg.	2nd	
1985–86	5	Reg. Pref.	12th	
1986–87	5	Reg. Pref.	6th	
1987–88	5	Reg. Pref.	5th	
1988–89	5	Reg. Pref.	10th	
1989–90	5	Reg. Pref.	11th	
1990–91	6	1ª Reg.		
1991–92	6	1ª Reg.		
1992–93	6	1ª Reg.		
1993–94	6	1ª Reg.		

Season	Tier	Division	Place	Copa del Rey
1994–95	6	1ª Reg.		
1995–96	6	1ª Reg.		
1996–97	6	1ª Reg.		
1997–98	6	1ª Reg.		
1998–99	6	1ª Reg.	10th	
1999–2000	6	1ª Prov.	1st	
2000–01	5	1ª Reg.	10th	
2001–02	5	1ª Reg.	1st	
2002–03	4	3ª	4th	
2003–04	4	3ª	3rd	
2004–05	3	2ª B	17th	
2005–06	4	3ª	3rd	
2006–07	3	2ª B	12th	
2007–08	3	2ª B	9th	
2008–09	3	2ª B	9th	
2009–10	3	2ª B	16th	
2010–11	3	2ª B	15th	
2011–12	3	2ª B	7th	
2012–13	3	2ª B	15th	
2013–14	3	2ª B	4th	

Season	Tier	Division	Place	Copa del Rey
2014–15	3	2ª B	5th	Second round
2015–16	3	2ª B	6th	Second round
2016–17	3	2ª B	12th	Round of 32
2017–18	3	2ª B	13th	
2018–19	3	2ª B	7th	
2019–20	3	2ª B	9th	First round
2020–21	3	2ª B	10th / 7th	First round
2021–22	5	3ª RFEF	1st	First round
2022–23	4	2ª Fed.	6th	Second round
2023–24	4	2ª Fed.	4th	First round
2024–25	4	2ª Fed.	17th	First round
2025–26	5	3ª Fed.	2nd	
2026–27	5	3ª Fed.		TBD

- 16 seasons in Segunda División B
- 3 seasons in Segunda Federación
- 3 seasons in Tercera División
- 3 seasons in Tercera Federación/Tercera División RFEF

== Current squad ==
As of 27 September 2025

Note: Flags indicate national team as defined under FIFA eligibility rules; some limited exceptions apply. Players may hold more than one non-FIFA nationality.

No.	Pos.	Nation	Player
1	GK	ESP	Dani Fernández
2	MF	CIV	Hassan Keita
3	DF	ESP	Rodri Flórez
4	DF	ESP	Juan Carlos Oliver
5	DF	ESP	José Ruiz
7	MF	ESP	Hugo García
8	DF	ESP	Jesús Boigues
9	FW	ESP	Álex García
10	MF	ESP	Cristóbal Gil
11	MF	ESP	Víctor Segura
13	GK	DOM	Johan Guzmán

No.	Pos.	Nation	Player
14	MF	ESP	Alberto Martín
15	DF	ESP	Javi Alonso
16	DF	ESP	Aleix Ruiz
17	MF	ESP	Dani Sánchez
19	FW	ESP	Iván Santamaría
20	FW	ESP	Mesfin Gómez
21	MF	ESP	Hamza El Yahyaoui
22	FW	ESP	Rober
23	MF	GER	Alexander Kinateder
—	FW	ESP	Kike López

== Famous players ==
- (Peru) Pablo Zegarra
- (Spain) (Dominican Republic) José Freijo
- (Spain) Joselito
- (Spain) David Montero
