= Franco Torgnascioli =

Uruguayan footballer (born 1990)

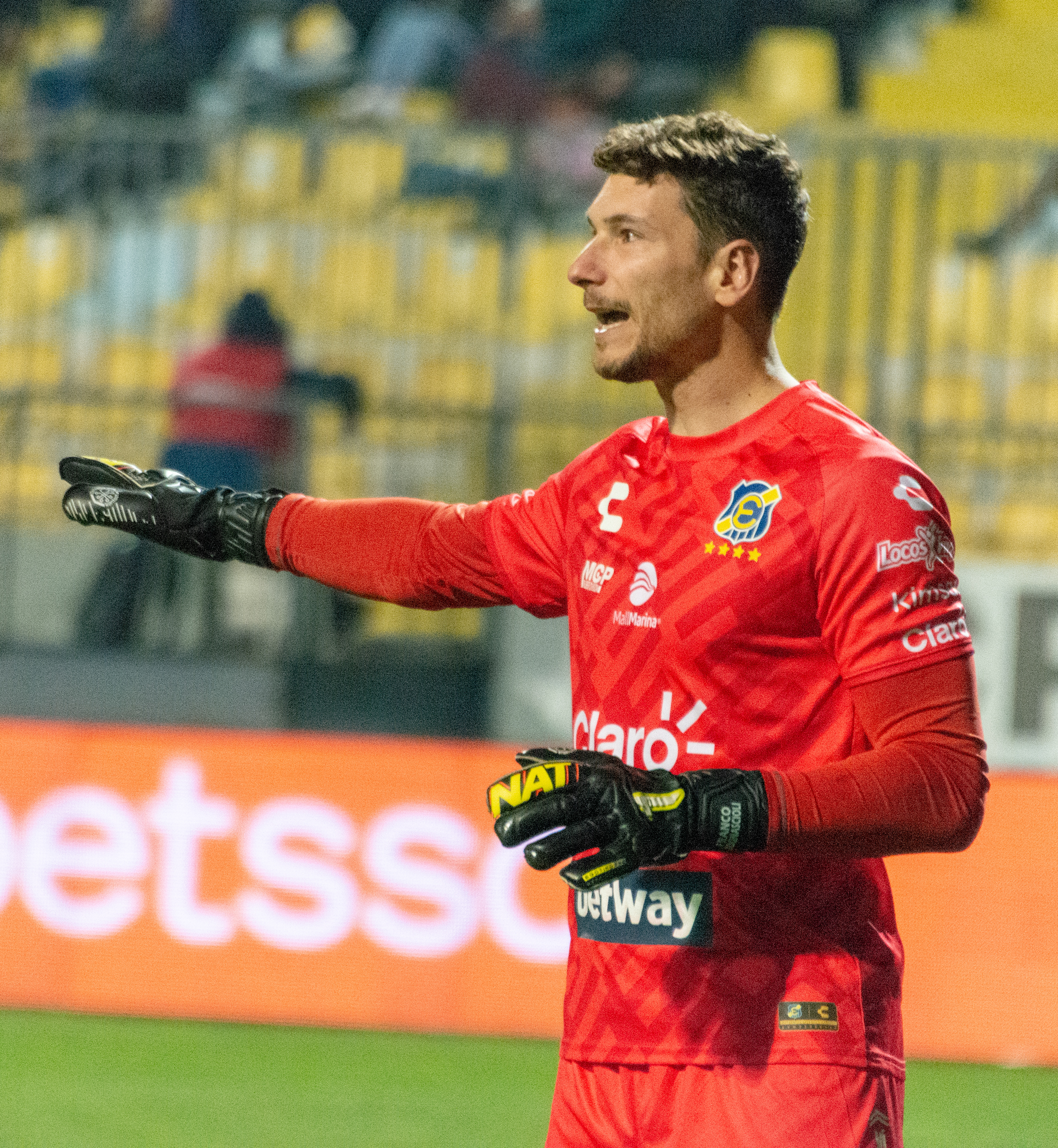
- Torgnascioli with Everton in 2023

Personal information
- Full name: Franco Luis Torgnascioli Lagreca
- Date of birth: 24 August 1990 (age 36)
- Place of birth: Salto, Uruguay
- Height: 1.86 m (6 ft 1 in)
- Position: Goalkeeper

Team information
- Current team: Montevideo City Torque
- Number: 1

Youth career
- Saladero FC
- Peñarol de Salto
- Ferro Carril
- 2007–2012: Danubio

Senior career*
Years	Team	Apps	(Gls)
2013–2015	Danubio	31	(0)
2013	→ Boston River (loan)	32	(0)
2016–2021	Pachuca	1	(0)
2016–2017	→ Zacatecas (loan)	40	(0)
2017–2018	→ Lorca (loan)	5	(0)
2018	→ Everton (loan)	0	(0)
2019–2020	→ Zacatecas (loan)	8	(0)
2021–2023	Everton	63	(0)
2022	→ San Luis (loan)	16	(0)
2024–2025	Unión Española	41	(0)
2025–	Montevideo City Torque	9	(0)
- * Club domestic league appearances and goals as of 1 October 2025

Franco Luis Torgnascioli Lagreca (born 24 August 1990) is an Uruguayan professional footballer who plays as a goalkeeper for Montevideo City Torque.

== Career ==
In July 2017, he was loaned to Spanish side Lorca FC from Pachuca.

In July 2022, he was loaned to San Luis de Quillota in the Primera B de Chile from Everton de Viña del Mar (a team owned by Grupo Pachuca) until the end of the season. He ended his contract with Everton in December 2023.

In 2024, Torgnascioli signed with Unión Española. He left them on 11 July 2025.
