= Johan Guzmán =

Dominican footballer

Personal information
- Full name: Johan Snick Guzmán de los Santos
- Date of birth: 3 July 1997 (age 29)
- Place of birth: San Juan de la Maguana, Dominican Republic
- Height: 1.80 m (5 ft 11 in)
- Position: Goalkeeper

Team information
- Current team: Guijuelo
- Number: 1

Senior career*
Years	Team	Apps	(Gls)
2017–2018	Atlético Pantoja		
2018–2021	Real Ávila	29	(0)
2021–2023	Guijuelo	35	(0)
2023–2024	Formentera	33	(0)
2024–	Guijuelo	30	(0)

International career^{‡}
2013	Dominican Republic U17	2	(0)
2021	Dominican Republic U23	2	(0)
2019–	Dominican Republic	6	(0)
- * Club domestic league appearances and goals as of 21 April 2025 ‡ National team caps and goals as of 10 September 2024

Johan Snick Guzmán de los Santos (born 3 July 1997) is a Dominican professional footballer who plays as a goalkeeper for Spanish club Guijuelo and the Dominican Republic national team.
