= Adán Gurdiel =

Spanish footballer

Personal information
- Full name: Adán Gurdiel Mella
- Date of birth: 14 December 1993 (age 32)
- Place of birth: Fabero, Spain
- Height: 1.78 m (5 ft 10 in)
- Positions: Right back; winger

Team information
- Current team: Badajoz
- Number: 21

Youth career
- SD Fabero
- Ponferradina

Senior career*
Years	Team	Apps	(Gls)
2011–2013	Ponferradina B	21	(2)
2012–2017	Ponferradina	65	(3)
2013–2014	→ Cultural Leonesa (loan)	30	(2)
2017–2018	Lorca	11	(0)
2018	Racing Santander	11	(0)
2018–2021	UCAM Murcia	62	(2)
2021	Real Murcia	14	(2)
2021–2022	El Ejido	11	(1)
2022	Linares Deportivo	15	(1)
2022–2023	Sabadell	20	(1)
2023–	Badajoz	5	(0)
- * Club domestic league appearances and goals as of 6 October 2024

Adán Gurdiel Mella (born 14 December 1993) is a Spanish footballer who plays for Badajoz as a right back or a right winger.

== Club career ==
Born in Fabero, Castile and León, Gurdiel finished his formation at SD Ponferradina's youth setup, and started playing as a senior with the reserve team in the 2011–12 season, in Tercera División. He made his first-team debut on 18 October of the following year, coming on as a second-half substitute in a 1–1 away draw against SD Huesca for the Copa del Rey.

On 13 January 2013, Gurdiel played his first game in Segunda División, featuring the last 24 minutes in a 0–1 home loss to CD Lugo. On 16 August, he was loaned to Segunda División B club Cultural y Deportiva Leonesa.

Gurdiel signed a new two-year deal with Ponfe on 17 July 2014. He scored his first professional goal on 20 December, netting his team's second in a 3–1 home win against RCD Mallorca; he was also converted to a right back during the campaign.

On 17 November 2015, Gurdiel agreed to a new three-year contract until 2018. He featured in 23 matches during the season, suffering relegation.

On 17 July 2017, Gurdiel terminated his contract with Ponferradina and signed for Lorca FC in the second division the following day. The following 31 January, after being sparingly used, he joined Racing de Santander after agreeing to a six-month contract.
