= Borja García (footballer, born January 1990) =

Spanish footballer

Personal information
- Full name: Borja García Santamaría
- Date of birth: 7 January 1990 (age 36)
- Place of birth: Laredo, Spain
- Height: 1.80 m (5 ft 11 in)
- Position: Centre back

Team information
- Current team: Barakaldo
- Number: 3

Youth career
- Racing Santander

Senior career*
Years	Team	Apps	(Gls)
2009–2013	Racing B	58	(2)
2011	Racing Santander	1	(0)
2013–2014	Peña Deportiva	8	(0)
2014	Ontinyent	13	(0)
2014–2015	Avilés	34	(3)
2015–2016	Logroñés	39	(3)
2016–2017	Lorca	31	(3)
2017–2020	Extremadura	36	(2)
2019	→ Logroñés (loan)	4	(0)
2019–2020	→ Recreativo (loan)	17	(0)
2020–2022	Cornellà	58	(4)
2022–2023	Badajoz	20	(1)
2023–	Barakaldo	56	(2)

International career
2005	Spain U16	1	(0)
2009	Spain U19	1	(0)
- * Club domestic league appearances and goals as of 9 June 2026

Borja García Santamaría (born 7 January 1990) is a Spanish footballer who plays as a defender for Barakaldo.

== Football career ==
García was born in Laredo, Cantabria. He graduated from Racing de Santander's youth ranks, and made his senior debuts with the reserves in the 2009–10 campaign in Segunda División B.

García made his first team - and La Liga - debut on 27 August 2011, playing the last 21 minutes in a 3–4 away defeat against Valencia CF. He continued to appear regularly with the B-side, however, and was released in 2013.

In October 2013 García joined Tercera División side SCR Peña Deportiva. On 24 January of the following year he moved to Ontinyent CF in the third level.

On 5 August 2014 García moved to Real Avilés, also in the third division. He remained in the category in the following years, representing UD Logroñés (two stints), Lorca FC, Extremadura UD and Recreativo de Huelva.
