= José Gaspar (footballer) =

Spanish footballer

Personal information
- Full name: José Manuel López Gaspar
- Date of birth: 12 July 1987 (age 39)
- Place of birth: Cáceres, Spain
- Height: 1.76 m (5 ft 9 in)
- Position: Winger

Team information
- Current team: Berceo

Youth career
- Cacereño

Senior career*
Years	Team	Apps	(Gls)
2005–2007	Cacereño		
2007–2008	Albacete B	36	(0)
2008–2009	Mérida	21	(2)
2009–2011	Logroñés	51	(4)
2011–2012	Badajoz	29	(7)
2012–2014	Cacereño	54	(9)
2014–2016	Huesca	56	(13)
2016–2018	Hércules	49	(4)
2018	Cartagena	9	(1)
2018–2019	Cornellà	27	(4)
2019–2022	Mérida	55	(5)
2022–	Berceo	54	(14)
- * Club domestic league appearances and goals as of 13 October 2024

José Manuel López Gaspar (born 12 July 1987) is a Spanish footballer who plays for Berceo as a winger.

He played 15 Segunda División matches for Huesca but spent most of his career in Segunda División B, where he represented nine teams and made over 250 appearances.

== Club career ==
Born in Cáceres, Extremadura, Gaspar made his senior debuts with CP Cacereño in 2005, in Tercera División. In the 2007 summer he moved to Albacete Balompié, being assigned to the reserves also in the fourth level.

On 10 October 2007 Gaspar played his first match as a professional, coming on as a substitute in a 0–2 home loss against Xerez CD, for the season's Copa del Rey. It was his maiden appearance with the first team, however.

In 2008 Gaspar moved to Mérida UD in Segunda División B. He continued to compete in the category in the following years, representing UD Logroñés, CD Badajoz, Cacereño and SD Huesca; with the latter he achieved promotion to Segunda División in the end of the 2014–15 campaign, appearing in 37 matches and scoring a career-best 13 goals.

Gaspar made his debut in the second tier on 22 August 2015, starting in a 2–3 home loss against Deportivo Alavés. On 19 August of the following year, he rescinded his contract, signing for third-tier Hércules CF three days later.

In January 2018, Gaspar signed for FC Cartagena after his release from Hércules. He scored the only goal of their playoff semi-final win over RC Celta de Vigo B in June, though the team lost the final by the same margin to Extremadura UD.

Gaspar joined UE Cornellà in August 2018. After helping them to the playoff quarterfinals in his one season in Catalonia, he returned to the city of Mérida to sign for Mérida AD.
