= Torremejía =

Torremejía, Spain
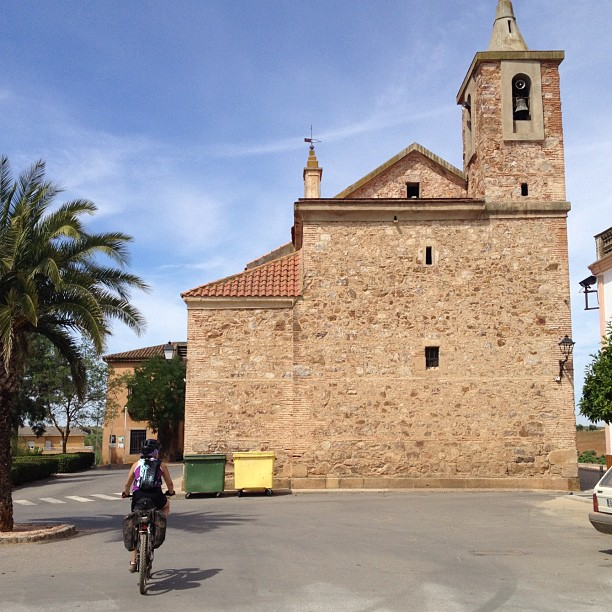
- Church of the Immaculate Conception of Torremejía

- Flag Coat of arms
- Interactive map of Torremejía, Spain
- Coordinates: 38°47′N 06°22′W
- Country: Spain
- Autonomous community: Extremadura
- Province: Badajoz
- Municipality: Torremejía

Area
  - Total: 23 km^{2} (8.9 sq mi)
- Elevation: 302 m (991 ft)

Population (2025-01-01)
  - Total: 2,238
  - Density: 97/km^{2} (250/sq mi)
- Time zone: UTC+1 (CET)
  - Summer (DST): UTC+2 (CEST)

Torremejía (Spanish pronunciation: [to.re.meˈxi.a]) is a municipality located in the province of Badajoz, Extremadura, Spain. According to the 2006 census (INE), the municipality has a population of 2184 inhabitants.

== See also ==
- List of municipalities in Badajoz
