= Haritz Albisua =

Spanish footballer

Personal information
- Full name: Haritz Albisua Laskurain
- Date of birth: 1 October 1992 (age 34)
- Place of birth: Soraluze, Spain
- Height: 1.82 m (6 ft 0 in)
- Position: Midfielder

Team information
- Current team: Teruel
- Number: 16

Youth career
- Eibar

Senior career*
Years	Team	Apps	(Gls)
2010–2012	Eibar B	36	(2)
2011–2013	Eibar	3	(0)
2012–2013	→ Elgoibar (loan)	28	(3)
2013–2014	Portugalete	34	(3)
2014–2016	Barakaldo	63	(2)
2016–2018	Lorca	14	(1)
2017	→ Lleida Esportiu (loan)	13	(0)
2018–2019	Unionistas	16	(1)
2019–2020	Linense	18	(0)
2020–2021	Leioa	25	(1)
2021–2022	Logroñés	28	(3)
2022–2023	Amorebieta	22	(0)
2023–2025	Alcoyano	62	(1)
2025–	Teruel	36	(1)
- * Club domestic league appearances and goals as of 10 June 2026

Haritz Albisua Laskurain (born 1 October 1992) is a Spanish professional footballer who plays as a central midfielder for Primera Federación club Teruel.

== Club career ==
Born in Soraluze-Placencia de las Armas, Gipuzkoa, Basque Country, Albisua was a SD Eibar youth graduate. He made his senior debut with the reserves in 2010, in Tercera División.

Alibsua made his first team debut on 27 November 2011, starting in a 2–1 home win against Gimnástica de Torrelavega in the Segunda División B championship. On 6 October of the following year, he was loaned to fourth tier club CD Elgoibar until the end of the season.

On 20 July 2013, Albisua signed for Club Portugalete, still in the fourth division. The following 29 May, he agreed to a one-year deal with third level club Barakaldo CF.

On 12 July 2016, Albisua moved to fellow third division side Lorca FC. On 25 January of the following year, he joined Lleida Esportiu on loan until June.

Despite being deemed surplus to requirements during the 2017 summer transfer window, Albisua was registered with the main squad and made his professional debut on 27 January 2018, coming on as a second-half substitute for Abel Gómez in a 1–5 Segunda División away loss against Rayo Vallecano. He featured in only one more match for the side before leaving in July.

On 12 November 2018, Albisua signed for Unionistas de Salamanca CF in the third tier, as a replacement for injured Pau Cendrós. The following 1 August, he moved to fellow league team Real Balompédica Linense.

On 2 October 2020, Alibsua agreed to a deal with SD Leioa, still in division three. After establishing himself as a regular starter, he moved to Primera División RFEF side SD Logroñés on 21 June of the following year.

On 23 July 2022, Albisua joined SD Amorebieta, freshly relegated to the third level. He was mainly a backup option during the campaign, as the Azules returned to division two at first attempt.

== Honours ==
Amorebieta

- Primera Federación: 2022–23 (Group 2 and overall champion)
