= Chechu (footballer, born 1996) =

Spanish footballer (born 1996)

Personal information
- Full name: Jesus Sánchez López
- Date of birth: 22 January 1996 (age 30)
- Place of birth: La Línea, Spain
- Position: Defender

Youth career
- 2003–2007: Atlético Zabal
- 2007–2009: Cádiz
- 2009–2012: Taraguilla
- 2012–2014: Recreativo

Senior career*
Years	Team	Apps	(Gls)
2013–2014	Recreativo B	11	(0)
2014	Recreativo	1	(0)
2015	Lincoln		
- * Club domestic league appearances and goals as of 23 March 2014

Jesus Sánchez López (born 22 January 1996), commonly known as Chechu, is a Spanish professional footballer who plays as a defender.

== Career ==
Chechu was born in La Línea de la Concepción, province of Cádiz. He finished his formation with Recreativo de Huelva's youth setup, and made his senior debuts with the reserves in the 2013–14 campaign, in Tercera División.

On 4 January 2014 Chechu played his first match as a professional, starting in a 0–2 loss against Córdoba CF at the Estadio Nuevo Arcángel, in the Segunda División championship.
