= Ander Vitoria =

Spanish footballer

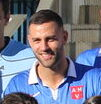
- 2017

Personal information
- Full name: Ander Vitoria Agirre
- Date of birth: 22 January 1990 (age 36)
- Place of birth: Igorre, Spain
- Height: 1.79 m (5 ft 10 in)
- Position: Forward

Youth career
- Zubizarreta-Igorre
- 2000–2008: Athletic Bilbao

Senior career*
Years	Team	Apps	(Gls)
2007–2012	Basconia	75	(17)
2010–2011	→ Lemona (loan)	23	(3)
2011–2012	→ Amorebieta (loan)	27	(3)
2012–2013	Portugalete	34	(24)
2013–2014	Sant Andreu	35	(6)
2014–2015	Leioa	37	(11)
2015–2016	Burgos	36	(7)
2016–2018	Barakaldo	70	(27)
2018–2021	UD Logroñés	56	(15)
2021–2022	Cultural Leonesa	29	(10)
2022–2023	Hércules	22	(0)
2023–2024	UD Logroñés	8	(0)
2024	Soneja	5	(0)

International career
2006–2007	Spain U17	9	(3)
Medal record
Men's football
Representing Spain
European U-17 Championship
Winner	2007 Belgium
- * Club domestic league appearances and goals as of 5 May 2024

Ander Vitoria Agirre (born 22 January 1990) is a Spanish professional footballer who plays as a forward.

== Club career ==
Born in Igorre, Biscay, Basque Country, Vitoria joined Athletic Bilbao's Lezama in 2000, aged ten. He made his senior debut with the farm team in 2007, in Tercera División, and subsequently served two loan stints at Segunda División B sides SD Lemona and SD Amorebieta.

Vitoria left the Lions in 2012, and signed for Club Portugalete in the fourth tier. After scoring a career-best 24 goals in the campaign, he signed for UE Sant Andreu in division three.

Vitoria continued to appear in the third division in the following years, representing SD Leioa, Burgos CF, Barakaldo CF and UD Logroñés. He helped the latter in their first-ever promotion to Segunda División in 2020, scoring ten goals in 28 appearances (play-offs included).

Vitoria made his professional debut on 12 September 2020 at the age of 30, starting in a 0–1 away loss against Sporting de Gijón.

== Honours ==
Spain U17

- UEFA European Under-17 Championship: 2007
