= SD Formentera =

Football team

Formentera
- Full name: Sociedad Deportiva Formentera
- Nicknames: Rojillos, Rojinegros, Formenterenses
- Founded: 7 September 1971; 55 years ago
- Ground: Estadi Municipal, Sant Francesc Xavier, Formentera, Balearic Islands, Spain
- Capacity: 500
- President: Xicu Ferrer
- Head coach: Víctor Basadre
- League: Tercera Federación – Group 11
- 2025–26: Tercera Federación – Group 11, 6th of 18
Home colours	Away colours

Sociedad Deportiva Formentera is a football team based in Sant Francesc Xavier, Formentera in the Balearic Islands. The team plays in Tercera Federación – Group 11. The club's home ground is the Estadi Municipal, which has a capacity of 500 spectators.

== History ==
Founded in 1971, in 1979–80 the club took part in Tercera División, ending in relegation. It also entered the year's Copa del Rey, dispatching UD Porreras 3–2 on aggregate in the first round before falling 2–0 to Atlético Baleares in the second round.

Formentera returned to the fourth division in 2012, after winning the regional Preferente. In 2015–16, they reached the second round of the cup with a 2–1 win at Segunda División B team CD Alcoyano, and a year later they reached the last 32 of the competition before a 14–2 aggregate loss to La Liga team and UEFA Europa League holders Sevilla FC.

In that 2016–17 season, Formentera promoted for the first time ever to the third division after defeating Alavés B in the promotion play-offs. The following season, they reached again the round of 32 of the Copa del Rey, where they eliminated top-level club Athletic Bilbao after winning in San Mamés with a goal in the sixth minute of stoppage time; in the last 16 they were eliminated by another top-flight Basque team, Deportivo Alavés, and the league season ended with instant relegation.

== Season to season ==
Season	Tier	Division	Place	Copa del Rey
1971–72	4	1ª Reg.	5th	
1972–73	4	1ª Reg.	6th	
1973–74	4	1ª Reg.	5th	
1974–75	4	1ª Reg.	3rd	
1975–76	4	1ª Reg.	6th	
1976–77	4	Reg. Pref.	4th	
1977–78	5	Reg. Pref.		
1978–79	5	Reg. Pref.		
1979–80	4	3ª	19th	Second round
1980–81	5	Reg. Pref.	3rd	
1981–82	5	Reg. Pref.	3rd	
1982–83	5	Reg. Pref.	5th	
1983–84	5	Reg. Pref.	5th	
1984–85	5	Reg. Pref.	4th	
1985–86	5	Reg. Pref.	2nd	
1986–87	5	Reg. Pref.	3rd	
1987–88	5	Reg. Pref.	5th	
1988–89	5	Reg. Pref.		
1989–90	5	Reg. Pref.		
1990–91	5	Reg. Pref.	1st	

Season	Tier	Division	Place	Copa del Rey
1991–92	5	Reg. Pref.	2nd	
1992–93	5	Reg. Pref.	1st	
1993–94	5	Reg. Pref.	3rd	
1994–95	5	Reg. Pref.	3rd	
1995–96	5	Reg. Pref.	3rd	
1996–97	5	Reg. Pref.	8th	
1997–98	5	Reg. Pref.	7th	
1998–99	5	Reg. Pref.	6th	
1999–2000	5	Reg. Pref.	9th	
2000–01	5	Reg. Pref.	5th	
2001–02	5	Reg. Pref.	6th	
2002–03	5	Reg. Pref.	3rd	
2003–04	5	Reg. Pref.	7th	
2004–05	5	Reg. Pref.	6th	
2005–06	5	Reg. Pref.	9th	
2006–07	5	Reg. Pref.	9th	
2007–08	5	Reg. Pref.	11th	
2008–09	5	Reg. Pref.	7th	
2009–10	5	Reg. Pref.	10th	
2010–11	5	Reg. Pref.	2nd	

Season	Tier	Division	Place	Copa del Rey
2011–12	5	Reg. Pref.	1st	
2012–13	4	3ª	3rd	
2013–14	4	3ª	3rd	
2014–15	4	3ª	1st	
2015–16	4	3ª	2nd	Second round
2016–17	4	3ª	1st	Round of 32
2017–18	3	2ª B	17th	Round of 16
2018–19	4	3ª	4th	
2019–20	4	3ª	7th	
2020–21	4	3ª	3rd / 4th	
2021–22	4	2ª RFEF	7th	
2022–23	4	2ª Fed.	11th	
2023–24	4	2ª Fed.	13th	
2024–25	5	3ª Fed.	3rd	
2025–26	5	3ª Fed.	6th	
2026–27	5	3ª Fed.		

- 1 season in Segunda División B
- 3 seasons in Segunda Federación/Segunda División RFEF
- 9 seasons in Tercera División
- 3 seasons in Tercera Federación

== Current squad ==
As of 3 February 2024.

Note: Flags indicate national team as defined under FIFA eligibility rules; some limited exceptions apply. Players may hold more than one non-FIFA nationality.

No.	Pos.	Nation	Player
1	GK	ESP	Dani García
3	DF	ESP	Kike Ferreres
4	DF	ESP	Joan Marí
6	MF	ESP	Jaime de las Marinas
7	FW	MAR	Ismail El Harchi
8	MF	ESP	Francisco Caturla
9	FW	ESP	Alberto Górriz
10	MF	ESP	Gorka Marcos
11	MF	ARG	Giuliano Bertino
12	MF	ESP	Adri Montalban

No.	Pos.	Nation	Player
13	GK	DOM	Johan Guzmán
14	MF	ESP	Chus Ruiz
15	DF	ESP	Javi Rosa
16	FW	ESP	Jay Romero
17	FW	ESP	Ibán Ribeiro
18	DF	ESP	Antonio Fernández
19	MF	ESP	Gorka Agirre
20	MF	ESP	Josiño
21	DF	ESP	Jorge Domingo
22	DF	ESP	Diego de la Mata
