= Antonio López (footballer, born September 1989) =

Spanish footballer

Personal information
- Full name: Antonio José López Martínez
- Date of birth: 5 September 1989 (age 37)
- Place of birth: Puerto Lumbreras, Spain
- Height: 1.86 m (6 ft 1 in)
- Position: Centre-back

Youth career
- 2004–2008: Valencia

Senior career*
Years	Team	Apps	(Gls)
2008–2010	Valencia B	1	(0)
2008–2009	→ Catarroja (loan)	15	(0)
2010	→ Burjassot (loan)	13	(3)
2010–2012	Levante B	33	(1)
2010	Levante	0	(0)
2012–2013	Hellín	28	(2)
2013–2014	Jove Español	31	(2)
2014–2018	Lorca	73	(6)
2018–2019	Cartagena	9	(1)
2019–2022	Murcia	32	(0)
- * Club domestic league appearances and goals as of 00:36, 5 January 2023 (UTC)

Antonio José López Martínez (born 5 September 1989) is a Spanish footballer who most recently played for Real Murcia. Mainly a central defender, he can also play as a right-back.

== Career ==
Born in Puerto Lumbreras, Murcia, López joined Valencia CF's youth setup in 2004, aged 14. He made his debuts as a senior while on loan at Catarroja CF in the 2008–09 season, in Tercera División.

After a loan stint at Burjassot CF, López moved to another reserve team, Levante UD B also in the fourth level. On 27 October 2010, he made his debut with the latter's main squad, playing the full 90 minutes in a 3–2 Copa del Rey away win against Xerez CD.

López subsequently struggled with injuries, and left the club in 2012. He subsequently joined Bakú Hellín Deportivo also in the fourth division.

In the 2013 summer López joined Hércules CF, being assigned to FC Jove Español San Vicente, the club's farm team. On 3 August 2014 he moved to Segunda División B side La Hoya Lorca CF.

López achieved promotion to the second division in 2017, with his club now named Lorca FC. He scored his first professional goal on 1 April 2018, netting his team's second in a 3–2 home win against Granada CF.

On 15 July 2018, López joined FC Cartagena still in the third division. On 3 July 2019, López signed a one-year deal with Real Murcia.
