= Curro Savoy =

Francisco Rodríguez Muñoz (b. Andújar, Jaén Province, 1948), known as Curro Savoy or Kurt Savoy, is a Spanish musician specialised in whistling who lives currently in France since 1981.

He was born in 1948, his mother worked selling candies, and his father was a construction worker. He started his professional career in 1959 in Madrid when Tico Medina and Yale presented him in a TV show. He later recorded a record with Saef Cetra and took part in several radio programmes.

He worked in western films in more than a hundred films such as The Good, the Bad, and the Ugly. For a Few Dollars More, A Fistful of Dollars, and Once Upon a Time in the West, between others, including a film with Gérard Depardieu and Catherine Deneuve. He became the president of an international society of whistlers, and he founded another one, Siffleurs du Monde.

He got married in 1972 with the bullfighter Clarita Montes, with whom he met in Casa de Campo and they had two children, Patricia and David.
