= Víctor Bravo (footballer) =

Spanish footballer

Personal information
- Full name: Víctor Daniel Bravo de Soto Vergara
- Date of birth: 23 August 1983 (age 43)
- Place of birth: Zaragoza, Spain
- Height: 1.84 m (6 ft 1/2 in)
- Position: Midfielder

Youth career
- Stadium Casablanca
- 2001–2002: Barcelona

Senior career*
Years	Team	Apps	(Gls)
2002–2003	Calahorra	3	(0)
2003–2005	Huesca	11	(0)
2005–2006	Burgos	23	(1)
2006–2007	Atlético Madrid B	25	(0)
2007–2008	Atlético Madrid	2	(0)
2007–2008	→ Universidad LP (loan)	24	(0)
2008–2009	Mérida	35	(5)
2009–2010	Pontevedra	34	(5)
2010–2011	Melilla	36	(7)
2011–2013	Tenerife	33	(6)
2013–2016	Tudelano	102	(17)
2016–2017	Ebro	26	(1)
2017–2019	Tudelano	62	(9)
2019–2020	Teruel	15	(2)
Total		431	(53)

Managerial career
- 2020–2023: Teruel
- 2024–2025: Terrassa
- * Club domestic league appearances and goals

Víctor Daniel Bravo de Soto Vergara (born 23 August 1983 in Zaragoza, Aragon) is a Spanish former professional footballer who played as a midfielder. He is currently a manager.
