= Carlos Martínez (footballer, born February 1989) =

Spanish footballer

Personal information
- Full name: Carlos Leopoldo Martínez Garrido
- Date of birth: 12 February 1989 (age 37)
- Place of birth: Córdoba, Spain
- Height: 1.71 m (5 ft 7 in)
- Position: Winger

Youth career
- 2008: Córdoba

Senior career*
Years	Team	Apps	(Gls)
2007–2012	Córdoba B	95	(10)
2008–2009	→ Montilla (loan)	31	(1)
2011–2012	Córdoba	0	(0)
2012–2013	Lucena	31	(5)
2013–2014	La Hoya Lorca	34	(9)
2014–2015	Cartagena	31	(4)
2015–2018	Lorca	82	(11)
2018	Murcia	13	(3)
2018–2020	Recreativo	28	(2)
2021	Lincoln Red Imps	7	(6)
- * Club domestic league appearances and goals

Carlos Leopoldo Martínez Garrido (born 12 February 1989) is a Spanish retired footballer who played as a winger.

== Club career ==
Born in Córdoba, Andalusia, Martínez started playing as a senior with Villanueva CF in the 2006–07 campaign, in Tercera División. He moved to Córdoba CF in January 2007, being assigned to the youth setup.

On 7 September 2011 Martínez played his first match as a professional, starting in a 1–0 away win against Real Murcia, for the season's Copa del Rey. He spent the vast majority of his spell playing with the reserves also in the fourth level, however.

On 10 July 2012 Martínez joined Lucena CF, in Segunda División B. He continued to appear in the third level in the following campaigns, representing La Hoya Lorca CF and FC Cartagena.

On 3 August 2015 Martínez returned to La Hoya Lorca, and achieved promotion to Segunda División in 2017, as the club changed its name to Lorca FC. The following 19 January, he signed for Real Murcia after cutting ties with his previous club.
