= David Fas =

Spanish footballer

Personal information
- Full name: David Fas Rojo
- Date of birth: 16 August 1980 (age 46)
- Place of birth: Valencia, Spain
- Height: 1.79 m (5 ft 10 in)
- Position: Winger

Youth career
- Levante

Senior career*
Years	Team	Apps	(Gls)
1999–2001	Levante B		
2001–2002	Onda	26	(0)
2002–2003	Universidad LP	29	(5)
2003–2004	Almansa		
2004	Novelda	13	(0)
2004–2006	Universidad LP	40	(5)
2006–2007	Salamanca	15	(0)
2007–2009	Ceuta	53	(2)
2009–2010	Universidad LP	33	(5)
2010–2011	Alzira	31	(9)
2011–2013	Huracán	57	(14)
2013–2015	Eldense	38	(3)
2015–2019	Saguntino	104	(19)
2021–2022	Mislata	6	(2)
- * Club domestic league appearances and goals

David Fas Rojo (born 16 August 1980) is a Spanish former footballer who played as a right winger.
