= Javi Pérez (footballer, born 1986) =

Spanish footballer

Personal information
- Full name: Francisco Javier Pérez Páez
- Date of birth: 27 January 1986 (age 40)
- Place of birth: Córdoba, Spain
- Height: 1.80 m (5 ft 11 in)
- Position: Midfielder

Team information
- Current team: Villafranca (manager)

Youth career
- Córdoba

Senior career*
Years	Team	Apps	(Gls)
2006–2009	Córdoba B	56	(8)
2006	→ Bailén (loan)	5	(1)
2008	Córdoba	1	(0)
2009–2010	Alcalá	25	(2)
2010–2011	Pozoblanco	37	(2)
2011–2012	Extremadura	38	(2)
2012–2013	San Roque	12	(1)
2013	Martos	16	(0)
2013–2014	Puertollano	31	(5)
2014–2015	Martos	31	(2)
2015–2018	Extremadura	73	(6)
2018	→ Badajoz (loan)	14	(0)
2018–2021	Extremadura B	51	(2)
2021–2025	Villafranca	110	(7)

Managerial career
- 2025–: Villafranca
- * Club domestic league appearances and goals

Francisco Javier "Javi" Pérez Páez (born 27 January 1986) is a Spanish football coach and a former central midfielder who is the manager of Tercera Federación club Villafranca.

== Club career ==
Born in Córdoba, Andalusia, Pérez was a Córdoba CF youth graduate, and made his senior debut while on loan at Recreativo de Bailén in January 2006. In July, he returned to the Verdiblancos, being assigned to the reserves in the Tercera División.

Pérez made his first team debut on 6 December 2008, coming on as a late substitute for Yordi in a 1–3 away loss against Elche CF in the Segunda División. He left the club at the end of the season, and subsequently signed for RSD Alcalá in Segunda División B.

Pérez continued to appear in the lower leagues in the following years, representing CD Pozoblanco, Extremadura UD (two stints), Martos CD (two stints), CD San Roque de Lepe, CD Puertollano and CD Badajoz.

On 20 July 2018, Pérez was demoted to Extremadura's reserve team after accepting an offer to become a director of the youth setup.
