= Félix Quero =

Spanish footballer

Personal information
- Full name: Félix Quero López
- Date of birth: 7 September 1982 (age 44)
- Place of birth: Avilés, Spain
- Height: 1.71 m (5 ft 7 1/2 in)
- Position: Forward

Youth career
- Revillagigedo

Senior career*
Years	Team	Apps	(Gls)
2001–2003	Astur	61	(13)
2003–2004	Mosconia	27	(5)
2004–2005	Pájara Playas	35	(3)
2005–2006	Leganés	38	(6)
2007	Ceuta	19	(2)
2007	Marino	19	(3)
2008–2011	Real Unión	99	(7)
2011–2012	Lugo	35	(3)
2012–2013	Logroñés	29	(0)
2013–2015	Jorge Wilstermann	63	(8)
2016–2017	Caudal	34	(3)
2017–2018	Marino	31	(11)
2018–2021	Llanera	72	(8)
2021–2022	Praviano	31	(5)
- * Club domestic league appearances and goals

Félix Quero López (born 7 September 1982) is a Spanish former footballer who played as a forward.

== Club career ==
Born in Avilés, Asturias, Quero spent the vast majority of his professional career in his country's lower leagues, amassing Segunda División B totals of 284 matches and 26 goals in representation of UD Pájara Playas de Jandía, CD Leganés, AD Ceuta, Marino de Luanco, Real Unión, CD Lugo, UD Logroñés and Caudal Deportivo; he promoted to Segunda División with the fifth and sixth clubs, contributing to the feats with a total of 78 games and six goals.

Quero made his debut as a professional on 29 August 2009, starting in a 0–1 home loss against Recreativo de Huelva. He scored his first and only goal in the second level on 24 April 2010, the first one in an eventual 2–0 home win over Real Murcia as the Basques eventually suffered relegation.

In 2013, aged 31, Quero moved abroad for the first time in his career, signing for Club Jorge Wilstermann in Bolivia.
