= Curro Vacas =

Spanish footballer

Personal information
- Full name: Francisco Juan Vacas Navarro
- Date of birth: 21 November 1979 (age 46)
- Place of birth: Córdoba, Spain
- Height: 1.83 m (6 ft 0 in)
- Position: Midfielder

Senior career*
Years	Team	Apps	(Gls)
1998–2001	Córdoba B	43	(5)
2001–2002	Numancia	27	(1)
2002–2003	Zamora	17	(0)
2003–2004	Atlético Madrid B	26	(1)
2004–2005	Racing Ferrol	36	(2)
2005–2008	Poli Ejido	72	(1)
2008–2009	Zamora	35	(2)
2009–2011	Racing Ferrol	54	(0)
2011–2013	Lucena	59	(0)
2013–2015	Conquense	57	(3)
2015–2017	Ciudad Lucena	63	(1)
2017–2018	Atlético Espeleño	20	(0)
Total		509	(16)
- * Club domestic league appearances and goals

Francisco Juan Vacas Navarro (born 21 November 1979 in Córdoba, Andalusia), commonly known as Curro Vacas, is a Spanish former professional footballer who played as a central midfielder.
