= Chechu (footballer, born April 1982) =

Spanish footballer

Personal information
- Full name: Francisco Javier Flores Gómez
- Date of birth: 19 April 1982 (age 44)
- Place of birth: Jaén, Spain
- Height: 1.75 m (5 ft 9 in)
- Position: Midfielder

Youth career
- Figueres
- 2000: Banyoles

Senior career*
Years	Team	Apps	(Gls)
2000–2001	Banyoles	20	(2)
2001–2011	Girona	228	(28)
2011–2014	Tenerife	75	(5)
2014–2019	Hércules	146	(30)
2019–2021	Orihuela	46	(6)
2021–2022	Athletic Torrellano	25	(3)
2022–2023	Callosa Deportiva	17	(2)
Total		557	(76)
- * Club domestic league appearances and goals

Francisco Javier Flores Gómez (born 19 April 1982), known as Chechu, is a Spanish former professional footballer who played as a midfielder.

== Club career ==
Chechu was born in Jaén, Andalusia. He spent ten seasons with Girona FC, helping the club to promote from Tercera División to Segunda División.

After leaving the Estadi Montilivi at the age of 29, Chechu returned to the Segunda División B and remained there for the next decade, with CD Tenerife, Hércules CF and Orihuela CF; the exception to this was the 2013–14 campaign, where he played with the first of these teams.
