= Lorca FC =

- Full name: Lorca Fútbol Club, S.A.D.
- Founded: 1 June 2003; 23 years ago (as La Hoya Deportiva Club de Fútbol)
- Dissolved: 2022
- Ground: Francisco Artés Carrasco; Lorca, Murcia, Spain
- Capacity: 8,120
- 2021–22: Preferente Autonómica – Group 2, 15th of 15 (withdrew)
Home colours	Away colours

Lorca Fútbol Club was a Spanish football team based in Lorca, in the autonomous community of the Region of Murcia. Founded in 2003, it last played in Preferente Autonómica de Murcia – Group 1, holding home games at Estadio Francisco Artés Carrasco, which has a capacity of 8,120.

== History ==
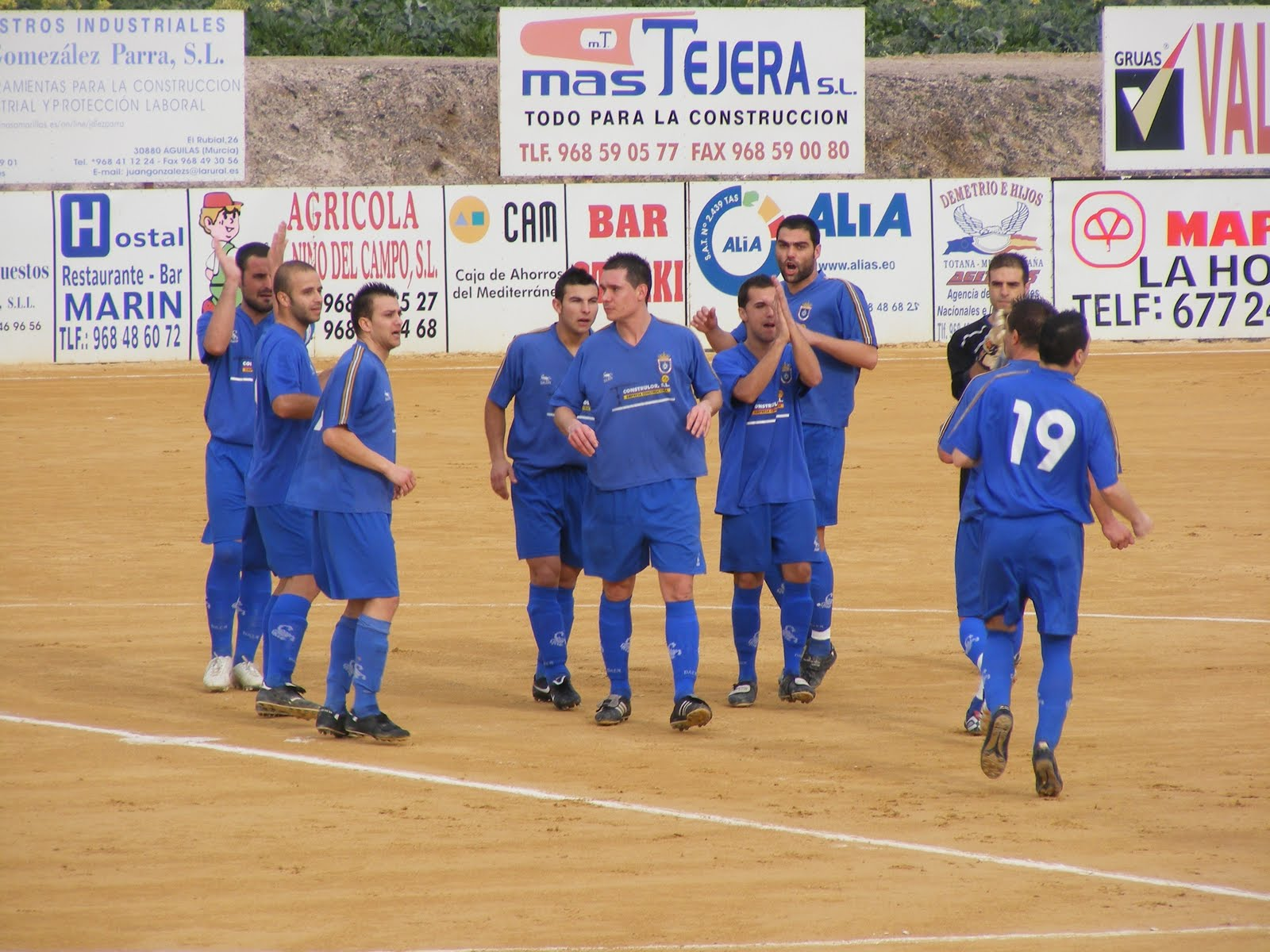
La Hoya Deportiva, during a match of the 2009–10 season.

Club crest used from 2010 to 2016

The club was founded in 2003 as La Hoya Deportiva Club de Fútbol by constructor Pedro Rosell, whose enterprise sponsored the team in its first years.

In 2010, the club changes its name to La Hoya Lorca Club de Fútbol in 2010, after the promotion of the club to Tercera División, but continues playing in La Hoya. Rossell resigned as president and Luis Jiménez replaced him. During these years, the team was nicknamed as El Brócoli Mecánico (The Clockwork Broccoli) after the vegetable, a major local export. In 2011, La Hoya Lorca started playing its games at Estadio Francisco Artés Carrasco in Lorca.

In 2013, La Hoya Lorca won promotion to Segunda División B via the play-offs, defeating SCR Peña Deportiva on away goals after a 4–4 aggregate draw. The club previously finished the Copa Federación de España as runner-up, in the club's first success in national football.

In successive seasons, the club attracted attention for their kit which had broccoli imprinted over the entire shirt and shorts.

On 8 July 2016, the club changed its name to Lorca Fútbol Club when it was bought by former Chinese international player and manager Xu Genbao. When Lorca played FC Jumilla in November 2016 the match was broadcast live over the internet in China as Jumilla are also under Chinese ownership.

On 27 May 2017, the club achieved promotion to Segunda División after a 0–0 away draw against Albacete Balompié in the play-offs (1–1 on aggregate). Three weeks later, rumours about a possible transfer of the club started to appear. Xu Genbao supposedly would sell the club and its place in the second division for €9 million and the owner of Hércules CF would be interested in refounding the club from this one, as his own had serious financial trouble.

In the 2017–18 season, Lorca were relegated with 33 points in 42 matches. During the summer, the Royal Spanish Football Federation announced that the team would be banned for playing in the third tier the following season for not meeting the economic requirements. At the same time, Xu decided to sell this team to a businessman.

=== Bankruptcy ===
In the 2018–19 season the club finished third in Tercera División, Group 18 with 80 points. However, they were eliminated in the first round by Alcobendas Sport, thus missing out on the opportunity for promotion. During the following summer, a controversy emerged when the Murcian team announced their search for players willing to play for free, receiving only the necessary essentials such as clothing and paid travel costs. The club owner stated that there was simply not enough money available.

The idea of recruiting players at no cost proved to be ineffective, and by the winter break, the team found themselves six points away from the promotion spots. On 4 December 2019, the club's entry into bankruptcy was approved after failing to reach an agreement to settle a debt of €700,000. Subsequently, on 29 December, Walter Pandiani resigned as manager and was replaced by Uruguayan manager Walter Caprile.

Following a disastrous 2020–21 campaign, where the Lorca club finished bottom of Group 13 (B) of the Tercera División, they were relegated to the Preferente Autonómica after twelve seasons competing in national tiers. In order to revitalise the project for the 2021–22 season, club president Roberto Torres appointed Murcian coach Paco Montesinos to lead the Lorca squad.

Eventually, on 4 February 2022, the club president announced their withdrawal from competition, marking their last game in the Preferente on 23 January 2022. Three weeks later, the Commercial Court nº 2 of Murcia dissolved the club due to non-compliance with the agreement made with creditors in November 2020, which was later modified in June 2021. The club had declared bankruptcy in November 2019 with debts totaling around €700,000.

=== Club background ===
- La Hoya Deportiva Club de Fútbol: (2003–2010)
- La Hoya Lorca Club de Fútbol: (2010–2016)
- La Hoya Lorca Club de Fútbol, S.A.D.: (2016–2017)
- Lorca Fútbol Club, S.A.D.: (2017–2022)

== Season to season ==
- As La Hoya Deportiva

Season	Tier	Division	Place	Copa del Rey
2003–04	6	1ª Terr.	13th	
2004–05	6	1ª Terr.	4th	
2005–06	6	1ª Terr.	6th	
2006–07	6	1ª Terr.	3rd	
2007–08	5	Terr. Pref.	10th	
2008–09	5	Terr. Pref.	15th	
2009–10	5	Terr. Pref.	1st	

- As La Hoya Lorca

Season	Tier	Division	Place	Copa del Rey
2010–11	4	3ª	7th	
2011–12	4	3ª	4th	
2012–13	4	3ª	1st	
2013–14	3	2ª B	2nd	First round
2014–15	3	2ª B	13th	First round
2015–16	3	2ª B	6th	

- As Lorca FC

Season	Tier	Division	Place	Copa del Rey
2016–17	3	2ª B	1st	Second round
2017–18	2	2ª	21st	Second round
2018–19	4	3ª	3rd	Third round
2019–20	4	3ª	7th	
2020–21	4	3ª	11th / 10th	
2021–22	6	Pref. Aut.	(R)	

- 1 season in Segunda División
- 4 seasons in Segunda División B
- 6 seasons in Tercera División

== Honours ==
- Segunda División B
  - Champions (1): 2016–17
- Tercera División
  - Champions (1): 2012–13

== Notable players ==
The following Lorca player(s) have been capped at full international level. Years in brackets indicate their spells at the club.

- (Nicaragua) Jaime Moreno (2017)
- (Equatorial Guinea) Federico Bikoro (2018)
- (Jamaica) Deshorn Brown (2018)
- (India) Ishan Pandita (2019–2020)

== See also ==
- Lorca FC B (reserve team)
- List of Lorca FC players
