= 2008–09 Sporting de Gijón season =

Real Sporting
2008–09 season
- Chairman: Manuel Vega-Arango
- Manager: Manuel Preciado
- Stadium: El Molinón
- La Liga: 14th
- Copa del Rey: Quarterfinals
- Top goalscorer: League: Mate Bilić (12); All: David Barral (14)
- Average home league attendance: 21,667

The 2008–09 Sporting de Gijón season was the first season that the club played in La Liga, the highest tier of football in Spain, eleven years after its last time.

In the previous season, the club promoted as third qualified of Segunda División.

== Overview ==
Sporting established a new record in La Liga of consecutive games without draws. It earned its first draw in the matchday 34 against Athletic Bilbao, but it lost a possible win in the 92nd minute.

The club avoided relegation after winning its last three season games against Málaga, at Real Valladolid and Recreativo de Huelva, all of them by 2–1 scorelines.

In the Copa del Rey, Sporting was eliminated in quarter-finals by Athletic Bilbao. The club had not reached this round since 1995.

== Squad ==
Note: Flags indicate national team as defined under FIFA eligibility rules; some limited exceptions apply. Players may hold more than one non-FIFA nationality.

No.	Pos.	Nation	Player
1	GK	ESP	Sergio Sánchez
3	DF	ESP	Neru
4	DF	ESP	Andreu
5	DF	ESP	Jorge
6	MF	ESP	Carmelo
7	MF	ESP	Pedro
8	MF	ESP	Míchel
9	FW	CRO	Mate Bilić
10	FW	ESP	Tati Maldonado
11	FW	ESP	Omar
12	DF	NED	Jürgen Colin
13	GK	ESP	Iván Cuéllar

No.	Pos.	Nation	Player
14	DF	ESP	Iván Hernández
15	DF	ESP	Roberto Canella (vice-captain)
16	DF	ESP	Gerard
17	FW	ESP	Diego Castro
18	FW	ESP	Luis Morán
19	MF	ESP	Diego Camacho
20	DF	ESP	Raúl Cámara
21	FW	ESP	Kike Mateo
22	DF	ESP	Rafel Sastre (captain)
23	FW	ESP	David Barral
24	MF	ESP	Sergio Matabuena
25	GK	ESP	Iñaki Lafuente

=== From the youth squad ===
Note: Flags indicate national team as defined under FIFA eligibility rules; some limited exceptions apply. Players may hold more than one non-FIFA nationality.

No. / Pos. / Nation / Player; 27 / MF / ESP / Alberto Lora	No. / Pos. / Nation / Player; 31 / DF / ESP / José Ángel

== Competitions ==
=== La Liga ===
==== Results by round ====
Round	1	2	3	4	5	6	7	8	9	10	11	12	13	14	15	16	17	18	19	20	21	22	23	24	25	26	27	28	29	30	31	32	33	34	35	36	37	38
Ground	H	A	H	A	H	A	H	A	H	A	A	H	A	H	A	H	A	H	A	A	H	A	H	A	H	A	H	A	H	H	A	H	A	H	A	H	A	H
Result	L	L	L	L	L	W	W	W	W	L	W	L	W	L	L	W	L	W	L	L	W	L	L	L	L	W	W	L	L	L	L	L	L	D	L	W	W	W
Position	14	20	20	20	20	19	15	13	12	14	9	13	10	12	12	11	12	9	11	14	12	12	14	14	17	13	11	11	13	17	17	17	18	18	18	17	17	14

Source: BDFutbol
A = Away; H = Home; W = Win; D = Draw; L = Loss

==== League table ====
Pos	Team	Pld	W	D	L	GF	GA	GD	Pts	Qualification or relegation
12	Racing Santander	38	12	10	16	49	48	+1	46 (Note: ALM 1–1 RAC; RAC 0–2 ALM)	
13	Athletic Bilbao	38	12	8	18	47	62	−15	44	Qualification for the Europa League third qualifying round (Note: Since Barcelona, winners of the 2008–09 Copa del Rey, already qualified for the 2009–10 UEFA Champions League, losing cup finalists Athletic Bilbao earned a spot in the third qualifying round of the 2009–10 UEFA Europa League.)
14	Sporting Gijón	38	14	1	23	47	79	−32	43 (Note: SPG: 12 pts; OSA: 2 pts → OSA 3–3 VLD; VLD: 2 pts → VLD 0–0 OSA)	
15	Osasuna	38	10	13	15	41	47	−6	43	
16	Valladolid	38	12	7	19	46	58	−12	43	

Source: LFP and Yahoo! Sport
Rules for classification: 1) points; 2) head-to-head points; 3) head-to-head goal difference; 4) head-to-head goals scored; 5) goal difference; 6) number of goals scored.

==== Matches ====
31 August 2008 1	Real Sporting	1–2	Getafe	El Molinón
	Castro 35'	Summary	Albín 15'; Casquero 85'	Referee: Pérez Burrull

13 September 2008 2	Sevilla	4–3	Real Sporting	Ramón Sánchez Pizjuán
	Chevantón 21'; Kanouté 35', 59'; Maresca 36'	Summary	Bilić 17', 19', 45' (pen.)	Referee: Mateu Lahoz

21 September 2008 3	Real Sporting	1–6	Barcelona	El Molinón
	Maldonado 50'; Gerard (red card) 56'	Summary	Xavi 27'; Eto'o 33'; Jorge 49' (o.g.); Iniesta 70'; Messi 85', 89'	Referee: Megía Dávila

24 September 2008 4	Real Madrid	7–1	Real Sporting	Santiago Bernabéu
	Van der Vaart 18', 33', 46'; Higuaín 38'; Robben 50'; Raúl 60', 64'	Summary	Mateo 52'	Referee: Rodríguez Santiago

27 September 2008 5	Real Sporting	0–1	Villarreal	El Molinón
		Report	Rossi 64'	Referee: Paradas Romero

5 October 2008 6	Mallorca	0–2	Real Sporting	Ono Estadi
		Summary	Carmelo 11'; Canella 49'	Referee: Ramírez Domínguez

19 October 2008 7	Real Sporting	2–1	Osasuna	El Molinón
	Carmelo 12'; Bilić 49'	Summary	Ezquerro 15'; Rovérsio (red card) 39'	Referee: Medina Cantalejo

26 October 2008 8	Deportivo La Coruña	0–3	Real Sporting	Riazor
	Colotto (red card) 43'	Summary	Barral 22'; Carmelo 26'; Castro 84'	Referee: Teixeira Vitienes

2 November 2008 9	Real Sporting	3–1	Numancia	El Molinón
	Morán 33'; Bilić 65', 76'	Report	Goiria 20'	Referee: Rubinos Pérez

9 November 2008 10	Racing Santander	1–0	Real Sporting	El Sardinero
	Camacho 57' (o.g.)	Report		Referee: Megía Dávila

15 November 2008 11	Valencia	2–3	Real Sporting	Mestalla
	Villa 66'; Mata 87'	Summary	Morán 19'; Barral 51'; Castro 80'	Referee: Paradas Romero

23 November 2008 12	Real Sporting	1–2	Betis	El Molinón
	Castro 25'	Report	Monzón 51'; Emaná 59'	Referee: Rodríguez Santiago

30 November 2008 13	Espanyol	0–1	Real Sporting	Olímpic Lluís Companys
		Report	Carmelo 29'	Referee: Pérez Lasa

6 December 2008 14	Real Sporting	2–5	Atlético Madrid	Gijón
	Bilić 3'; Barral 60'	Report	Agüero 5', 40'; Forlán 56', 81'; Rodríguez 72'	Stadium: El Molinón; Referee: Turienzo Álvarez

14 December 2008 15	Athletic Bilbao	3–0	Real Sporting	San Mamés
	Llorente 6'; Iraola 23'; López 32'	Summary		Referee: Pérez Burrull

21 December 2008 16	Real Sporting	1–0	Almería	El Molinón
	Maldonado 27'	Summary		Referee: Delgado Ferreiro

4 January 2009 17	Málaga	1–0	Real Sporting	La Rosaleda
	Lolo 34'	Summary		Referee: Iturralde González

11 January 2009 18	Valladolid	2–1	Real Sporting	El Molinón
	Carmelo 18'; Barral 36'	Report	Marcos (yellow card) (yellow-red card) 36'; García Calvo 88'	Referee: Pérez Lasa

18 January 2009 19	Recreativo	2–0	Real Sporting	Nuevo Colombino
	Jorge 6' (o.g.); Colunga 56'	Summary		Referee: Velasco Carballo

25 January 2009 20	Getafe	5–1	Real Sporting	Coliseum Alfonso Pérez
	Soldado 15', 56', 72'; Granero 16'; Uche 69'	Summary	Barral 44'	Referee: Turienzo Álvarez

1 February 2009 21	Real Sporting	1–0	Sevilla	El Molinón
	Castro 17'; Canella (red card) 28'	Summary		Referee: Megia Dávila

8 February 2009 22	Barcelona	3–1	Real Sporting	Camp Nou
	Eto'o 23', 40'; Alves 65'	Report	Mateo 68'	Referee: Rubinos Pérez

15 February 2009 23	Real Sporting	0–4	Real Madrid	El Molinón
		Summary	Raúl 15', 76'; Huntelaar 27'; Marcelo 49'	Referee: Mateu Lahoz

21 February 2009 24	Villarreal	2–1	Real Sporting	El Madrigal
	Rossi 2'; Capdevila 35'	Summary	Bilić 1'	Referee: Álvarez Izquierdo

1 March 2009 25	Real Sporting	0–1	Mallorca	El Molinón
		Summary	Arango 49'	Referee: Teixeira Vitienes

8 March 2009 26	Osasuna	1–2	Real Sporting	Reyno de Navarra
	Nekounam 28'	Summary	Barral 7'; Castro 20'	Referee: Medina Cantalejo

15 March 2009 27	Real Sporting	3–2	Deportivo La Coruña	El Molinón
	Morán 49'; Barral 52'; José Ángel 71'	Summary	Sergio 68'; Riki 86'	Referee: Rodríguez Santiago

22 March 2009 28	Numancia	2–1	Real Sporting	Los Pajaritos
	Barkero 43'; Goiria 54'	Summary	Barral 46'	Referee: Pérez Lasa

5 April 2009 29	Real Sporting	0–2	Racing Santander	El Molinón
		Summary	Žigić 54'; Colsa 89'	Referee: Ramírez Domínguez

12 April 2009 30	Real Sporting	2–3	Valencia	El Molinón
	Barral 34'; Bilić 71'	Summary	Silva 18'; Villa 54'; Mata 87'	Referee: Fernández Borbalán

19 April 2009 31	Betis	2–0	Real Sporting	El Molinón
	Emaná 7', 70'; Arzu (yellow card) (yellow-red card) 79'	Summary	Cuéllar (red card) 76'	Referee: Ramírez Domínguez

23 April 2009 32	Real Sporting	0–3	Espanyol	El Molinón
	Barral (red card) 75'	Summary	Nenê 24'; Román 71'; Callejón 73'	Referee: Ayza Gámez

26 April 2009 33	Atlético Madrid	3–1	Real Sporting	Vicente Calderón
	Forlán 28'; Simão 40'; Agüero 46'	Summary	Bilić 47'	Referee: Turienzo Álvarez

3 May 2009 34	Real Sporting	1–1	Athletic Bilbao	El Molinón
	Bilić 61'	Summary	Iraola 90'	Referee: Teixeira Vitienes

10 May 2009 35	Almería	3–1	Real Sporting	Mediterráneo
	Nieto 27'; Uche 55'; Piatti 90'	Summary	Carmelo 16'	Referee: Pérez Burrull

17 May 2009 36	Real Sporting	2–1	Málaga	El Molinón
	Gerard 23'; Rosário 52' (o.g.)	Summary	Weligton 37'	Referee: Undiano Mallenco

23 May 2009 37	Valladolid	1–2	Real Sporting	José Zorrilla
	Sesma 69'	Summary	Camacho 43'; Bilić 78'	Referee: Fernández Borbalán

31 May 2009 38	Real Sporting	2–1	Recreativo	El Molinón
	Barral 57'; Morán 61'	Summary	Martin 22'	Referee: Iturralde González

=== Copa del Rey ===
==== Matches ====
29 October 2008 Round of 32; First leg	Numancia	0–1	Real Sporting	Soria
		Report	Omar 11'	Stadium: Los Pajaritos; Referee: Velasco Carballo

12 November 2008 Round of 32; Second leg	Real Sporting	2–0	Numancia	Gijón
	Barral 22', 81'	Report		Stadium: El Molinón; Referee: Delgado Ferreiro

7 January 2009 Round of 16; First leg	Real Sporting	3–1	Valladolid	Gijón
	Barral 9', 18'; Carmelo 36'	Report	Canobbio 89'	Stadium: El Molinón; Referee: Pérez Burrull

14 January 2009 Round of 16; Second leg	Valladolid	2–1 (3–4 agg.)	Real Sporting	Gijón
	Canobbio 23'; Pedro León 77'	Report	Jorge 89'	Stadium: El Molinón; Referee: Ramírez Domínguez

22 January 2009 Quarterfinals; First leg	Athletic Bilbao	0–0	Real Sporting	Bilbao
		Report		Stadium: San Mamés; Referee: Medina Cantalejo

28 January 2009 Quarterfinals; Second leg	Sporting de Gijón	1–2 (1–2 agg.)	Athletic Bilbao	Gijón
	Carmelo 1'	Report	Gabilondo 42'; López 52'	Stadium: Estadio El Molinón; Referee: González Vázquez

== Squad statistics ==
=== Appearances and goals ===
No.	Pos	Nat	Player	Total		La Liga		Copa del Rey	
No.	Pos	Nat	Player	Apps	Goals	Apps	Goals	Apps	Goals
1	GK	(Spain) ESP	Sergio Sánchez	14	0	8+0	0	6+0	0
3	DF	(Spain) ESP	Neru	22	0	18+1	0	3+0	0
4	DF	(Spain) ESP	Andreu	7	0	3+3	0	1+0	0
5	DF	(Spain) ESP	Jorge	16	1	10+2	0	3+1	1
6	MF	(Spain) ESP	Carmelo	32	8	25+3	6	2+2	2
7	MF	(Spain) ESP	Pedro	21	0	12+5	0	3+1	0
8	MF	(Spain) ESP	Míchel	36	0	24+6	0	3+3	0
9	FW	(Croatia) CRO	Mate Bilić	41	12	22+15	12	3+1	0
10	FW	(Spain) ESP	Tati Maldonado	21	2	9+10	2	2+0	0
11	FW	(Spain) ESP	Omar Sampedro	10	1	0+4	0	5+1	1
12	DF	(Netherlands) NED	Jürgen Colin	4	0	2+0	0	2+0	0
13	GK	(Spain) ESP	Iván Cuéllar	18	0	18+0	0	0+0	0
14	DF	(Spain) ESP	Iván Hernández	27	0	21+1	0	5+0	0
15	DF	(Spain) ESP	Roberto Canella	24	1	24+0	1	0+0	0
16	DF	(Spain) ESP	Gerard Autet	27	1	25+1	1	1+0	0
17	FW	(Spain) ESP	Diego Castro	34	6	31+1	6	2+0	0
18	FW	(Spain) ESP	Luis Morán	31	4	19+9	4	1+2	0
19	MF	(Spain) ESP	Diego Camacho	36	1	27+4	1	3+2	0
20	DF	(Spain) ESP	Raúl Cámara	21	0	13+4	0	3+1	0
21	MF	(Spain) ESP	Kike Mateo	26	2	10+14	2	1+1	0
22	DF	(Spain) ESP	Rafel Sastre	33	0	30+0	0	3+0	0
23	FW	(Spain) ESP	David Barral	41	14	19+16	10	3+3	4
24	MF	(Spain) ESP	Sergio Matabuena	30	0	22+5	0	3+0	0
25	GK	(Spain) ESP	Iñaki Lafuente	13	0	12+1	0	0+0	0
27	MF	(Spain) ESP	Alberto Lora	10	0	4+4	0	2+0	0
31	DF	(Spain) ESP	José Ángel	17	1	10+3	1	4+0	0
Players who appeared for Sporting no longer at the club:
10	MF	(Spain) ESP	Pablo de Lucas	2	0	0+0	0	2+0	0
