= 2007–08 Sporting de Gijón season =

Real Sporting
2007–08 season
- Chairman: Manuel Vega-Arango
- Manager: Manuel Preciado
- Stadium: El Molinón
- Segunda División: 3rd (promoted)
- Copa del Rey: Second round
- Top goalscorer: League: Kike Mateo (12); All: Kike Mateo (12)
- Average home league attendance: 16,368

The 2006–07 Sporting de Gijón season was the tenth consecutive season of the club in Segunda División after its last relegation from La Liga.

== Overview ==
Real Sporting finished the season in the third position, achieving the promotion to La Liga by beating SD Eibar in the last matchday by 2–0.

== Squad ==
Note: Flags indicate national team as defined under FIFA eligibility rules; some limited exceptions apply. Players may hold more than one non-FIFA nationality.

No.	Pos.	Nation	Player
1	GK	ESP	Sergio Sánchez
2	DF	ESP	Jony López
3	DF	ESP	Chus Bravo
4	DF	ESP	Andreu
5	DF	ESP	Jorge
6	MF	ESP	Marcos Landeira
7	MF	ESP	Pedro
8	MF	ESP	Míchel
9	FW	CRO	Mate Bilić
10	MF	ESP	Pablo de Lucas
11	FW	ESP	Omar
12	DF	ESP	Neru
13	GK	ESP	Roberto

No.	Pos.	Nation	Player
14	DF	ESP	Iván Hernández
15	DF	ESP	Roberto Canella
16	DF	ESP	Gerard
17	FW	ESP	Diego Castro
18	FW	ESP	Luis Morán
19	MF	ESP	Jorge Pina
20	DF	ESP	Raúl Cámara
21	MF	ESP	Kike Mateo
22	DF	ESP	Rafel Sastre (captain)
23	FW	ESP	David Barral
24	MF	ESP	Sergio Matabuena
25	FW	COL	Carlos Hidalgo

=== From the youth squad ===
Note: Flags indicate national team as defined under FIFA eligibility rules; some limited exceptions apply. Players may hold more than one non-FIFA nationality.

No. / Pos. / Nation / Player; 28 / MF / ESP / Alberto Lora	No. / Pos. / Nation / Player; 29 / FW / ESP / Carlos Álvarez

== Competitions ==
=== Segunda División ===
==== Results by round ====
Round	1	2	3	4	5	6	7	8	9	10	11	12	13	14	15	16	17	18	19	20	21	22	23	24	25	26	27	28	29	30	31	32	33	34	35	36	37	38	39	40	41	42
Ground	H	A	H	A	H	A	A	H	A	H	A	H	A	H	A	H	A	H	A	H	A	A	H	A	H	A	H	H	A	H	A	H	A	H	A	H	A	H	A	H	A	H
Result	W	D	D	W	W	W	W	D	W	L	L	L	W	W	L	L	D	W	D	L	W	D	L	L	W	W	W	D	D	W	D	D	L	W	W	W	W	D	D	W	L	W
Position	1	3	9	5	3	2	2	3	2	3	3	4	3	2	3	3	3	3	3	3	3	3	3	6	4	3	3	4	4	3	3	3	3	3	3	3	3	2	3	2	3	3

Source: BDFutbol
A = Away; H = Home; W = Win; D = Draw; L = Loss

==== League table ====
Pos	Team	Pld	W	D	L	GF	GA	GD	Pts	Promotion or relegation
1	Numancia (C, P)	42	22	11	9	59	38	+21	77	Promotion to La Liga
2	Málaga (P)	42	20	12	10	58	42	+16	72 (Note: SPG 0–1 MÁL; MÁL 3–2 SPG)	Promotion to La Liga
3	Sporting Gijón (P)	42	20	12	10	61	40	+21	72	Promotion to La Liga
4	Real Sociedad	42	18	14	10	55	39	+16	68	
5	Castellón	42	16	13	13	42	37	+5	61	

Source: LFP - Liga Adelante
Rules for classification: 1st points; 2nd head-to-head points; 3rd head-to-head goal difference; 4th head-to-head goals scored; 5th goal difference; 6th number of goals scored; 7th Fair-play points
(C) Champions; (P) Promoted

==== Matches ====
26 August 2007 1	Real Sporting	4–0	Polideportivo Ejido	Gijón
	Barral 19', 55'; Kike Mateo 66'; Luis Morán 73'	Summary	Usero (red card) 17'	Stadium: El Molinón; Referee: Amoedo Chas

1 September 2007 2	Las Palmas	2–2	Real Sporting	Las Palmas
	Marcos Márquez 54'; Juanma 71'	Summary	Kike Mateo 42'; Iván Hernández (red card) 53'; Jorge 86'	Stadium: Gran Canaria; Referee: Iglesias Villanueva

9 September 2007 3	Real Sporting	1–1	Elche	Gijón
	Barral 20'	Summary	Coelho 50'	Stadium: El Molinón; Referee: Llorente Carcedo

15 September 2007 4	Xerez	0–2	Real Sporting	Jerez de la Frontera
		Summary	Barral 62'; Omar (red card) 81'; Sastre 90'	Stadium: Chapín; Referee: Del Cerro Grande

23 September 2007 5	Real Sporting	1–0	Albacete	Gijón
	Kike Mateo 48'	Report		Stadium: El Molinón; Referee: Caballero Herreros

29 September 2007 6	Numancia	0–2	Real Sporting	Soria
		Summary	Barral 66', 74'	Stadium: Los Pajaritos; Referee: Mateu Lahoz

6 October 2007 7	Hércules	2–3	Real Sporting	Alicante
	Montenegro 41'; Tote 50'	Summary	Míchel 9'; Pedro 45'; Sastre (red card) 74'; Canella 85'	Stadium: Rico Pérez; Referee: Pérez Montero

14 October 2007 8	Real Sporting	0–0	Racing Ferrol	Gijón
		Summary		Stadium: El Molinón; Referee: Gallo Moreno

20 October 2007 9	Real Sociedad	0–1	Real Sporting	Anoeta
	Diego Castro 84'	Report		Referee: Hevia Obras

28 October 2007 10	Real Sporting	0–1	Celta	Gijón
		Report	Okkas 62'	Stadium: El Molinón; Referee: Pino Zamorano

3 November 2007 11	Gimnàstic	2–0	Real Sporting	Tarragona
	Jandro 20', 56'	Summary		Stadium: Nou Estadi; Referee: Caballero Herreros

11 November 2007 12	Real Sporting	0–1	Málaga	Gijón
		Report	Baha 20'	Stadium: El Molinón; Referee: Mateu Lahoz

17 November 2007 13	Sevilla Atlético	1–3	Real Sporting	Seville
	David Prieto 80'	Report	Lolo 30' (o.g.); Kike Mateo 44'; Barral 87'	Stadium: Ramón Sánchez Pizjuán; Referee: González González

25 November 2007 14	Real Sporting	4–2	Cádiz	Gijón
	Kike Mateo 4', 55'; Luis Morán 75'; Diego Castro 77' (red card) 89'	Report	Gastón Casas 12' (red card) 89'; Gonzalo Vicente (red card) 34'; Dani 86'	Stadium: El Molinón; Referee: Del Cerro Grande

1 December 2007 15	Granada 74	1–0	Real Sporting	Motril
	Iván Hernández 37' (o.g.)	Summary	Karanka (red card) 83'	Stadium: Escribano Castilla; Referee: Pérez Lima

9 December 2007 16	Real Sporting	0–1	Tenerife	Gijón
		Summary	Sicilia 57'	Stadium: El Molinón; Referee: Ceballos Silva

15 December 2007 17	Salamanca	1–1	Real Sporting	Villares de la Reina
	Matabuena 21'	Summary	Pedro 44'	Stadium: El Helmántico; Referee: Estrada Fernández

22 December 2007 18	Real Sporting	3–2	Alavés	Gijón
	Barral 37'; Diego Castro 45'; Omar 49'	Report	Mena 72'; Aganzo 74'; Gaspar (yellow card) 0' (yellow-red card) 76'; Toni Moral (yellow card) 0' (yellow-red card) 81'	Stadium: El Molinón; Referee: Pérez Riverol

6 January 2008 19	Córdoba	2–2	Real Sporting	Córdoba
	Javi Moreno 41'; Juanlu 45'	Summary	Míchel (red card) 19'; Matabuena 70' (80)	Stadium: Nuevo Arcángel; Referee: Mateu Lahoz

13 January 2008 20	Real Sporting	0–2	Castellón	Gijón
		Summary	Arana 40'; López Garai 61'	Stadium: El Molinón; Referee: Hernández Hernández

20 January 2008 21	Eibar	0–3	Real Sporting	Eibar
	Txiki (red card) 41'	Summary	Diego Castro 2'; Barral 71'; Bilić 74'	Stadium: Ipurua; Referee: Del Cerro Grande

26 January 2008 22	Polideportivo Ejido	1–1	Real Sporting	El Ejido
	Gerardo 25'	Report	Barral 59'; Kike Mateo (yellow card) 0' (yellow-red card) 77'	Stadium: Santo Domingo; Referee: Afonso Suárez

3 February 2008 23	Real Sporting	0–1	Las Palmas	Gijón
		Summary	Colunga 57'	Stadium: El Molinón; Referee: Estrada Fernández

10 February 2008 24	Elche	3–1	Real Sporting	Elche
	Cobo 6'; Raúl Martín 26'; José Vega 89'	Summary	Barral 9'	Stadium: Manuel Martínez Valero; Referee: Amoedo Chas

16 February 2008 25	Real Sporting	2–0	Xerez	Gijón
		Summary	Bilić 38'; Kike Mateo 42'	Stadium: El Molinón; Referee: Rodado Rodríguez

23 February 2008 26	Albacete	1–2	Real Sporting	Albacete
	Alustiza 88'	Summary	De Lucas 18'; Sastre 81'	Stadium: Carlos Belmonte; Referee: Iglesias Villanueva

2 March 2008 27	Real Sporting	1–0	Numancia	Gijón
	Kike Mateo 40'	Summary		Stadium: El Molinón; Referee: Teixeira Vitienes

9 March 2008 28	Real Sporting	1–1	Hércules	Gijón
	Kike Mateo 54'	Summary	Ion Vélez 75'	Stadium: El Molinón; Referee: Gardeazábal Gómez

15 March 2008 29	Racing Ferrol	2–2	Real Sporting	Ferrol
	Olmo 28'; Jonathan Pereira 38'; Roberto Sousa (yellow card) 0' (yellow-red card) 69'; Castiñeiras (yellow card) 0' (yellow-red card) 89'	Summary	Bilić 5'; Diego Castro 50'	Stadium: A Malata; Referee: Gallo Moreno

22 March 2008 30	Real Sporting	1–0	Real Sociedad	Gijón
	Bilić 79'	Summary		Stadium: El Molinón; Referee: Del Cerro Grande

30 March 2008 31	Celta	0–0	Real Sporting	Vigo
		Summary		Stadium: Balaídos; Referee: Miranda Torres

5 April 2008 32	Real Sporting	3–3	Gimnàstic	Gijón
	Bilić 3', 51'; Omar 75'	Summary	Abel Buades 43'; Campano 57'; Moisés 86'	Stadium: El Molinón; Referee: Bernabé García

13 April 2008 33	Málaga	3–3	Real Sporting	Málaga
	Baha 16'; Antonio Hidalgo 57'; Gerardo 73'	Summary	Diego Castro 15'; Hidalgo 89'	Stadium: La Rosaleda; Referee: Martínez Franco

20 April 2008 34	Real Sporting	4–1	Sevilla Atlético	Gijón
	Kike Mateo 18', 55'; Jorge 49'; Bilić 63'	Summary	Alfaro 41'	Stadium: El Molinón; Referee: Hevia Obras

27 April 2008 35	Cádiz	0–1	Real Sporting	Cádiz
	Miguel García (red card) 48'	Summary	Diego Castro 60'; Raúl Cámara (yellow card) 0' (yellow-red card) 80'	Stadium: Ramón de Carranza; Referee: Gardeazábal Gómez

3 May 2008 36	Real Sporting	2–1	Granada 74	Gijón
	Míchel (red card) 36'; Kike Mateo 74'; Bilić 86'	Summary	Javi Guerra 47'	Stadium: El Molinón; Referee: Mateu Lahoz

10 May 2008 37	Tenerife	0–2	Real Sporting	Santa Cruz de Tenerife
		Summary	Míchel 27'; Pedro 40'	Stadium: Heliodoro Rodríguez López; Referee: Ceballos Silva

17 May 2008 38	Real Sporting	0–0	Salamanca	Gijón
		Summary		Stadium: El Molinón; Referee: Pérez Riverol

25 May 2008 39	Alavés	0–0	Real Sporting	Vitoria-Gasteiz
		Summary	Gerard (yellow card) 0' (yellow-red card) 76'	Stadium: Mendizorrotza; Referee: Iglesias Villanueva

31 May 2008 39	Real Sporting	2–1	Córdoba	Gijón
	Bilić 66'; Luis Morán 80'	Summary	Asen 55'	Stadium: El Molinón; Referee: Estrada Fernández

25 May 2008 41	Castellón	1–0	Real Sporting	Castellón de la Plana
	Nakor 60'	Summary	Gerard (yellow card) 0' (yellow-red card) 88'	Stadium: Castalia; Referee: Caballero Herreros

15 June 2008 42	Real Sporting	2–0	Eibar	Gijón
	Bilić 35'; Luis Morán 80'	Summary		Stadium: El Molinón; Referee: Amoedo Chas

=== Copa del Rey ===
==== Matches ====
5 September 2007 Second round	Granada 74	1–0	Real Sporting	Motril
	Javi Guerra 58'	Report		Stadium: Escribano Castilla; Referee: Martínez Franco

== Squad statistics ==
=== Appearances and goals ===
No.	Pos	Nat	Player	Total		Segunda División		Copa del Rey	
No.	Pos	Nat	Player	Apps	Goals	Apps	Goals	Apps	Goals
1	GK	(Spain) ESP	Sergio Sánchez	2	0	1+0	0	1+0	0
2	DF	(Spain) ESP	Jony López	4	0	3+0	0	1+0	0
3	DF	(Spain) ESP	Chus Bravo	0	0	0+0	0	0+0	0
4	DF	(Spain) ESP	Andreu	6	0	1+5	0	0+0	0
5	DF	(Spain) ESP	Jorge	32	2	28+3	2	1+0	0
6	MF	(Spain) ESP	Marcos Landeira	4	0	1+2	0	1+0	0
7	MF	(Spain) ESP	Pedro	37	2	33+4	2	0+0	0
8	MF	(Spain) ESP	Míchel	37	3	33+3	3	0+1	0
9	FW	(Croatia) CRO	Mate Bilić	22	10	20+2	10	0+0	0
10	FW	(Spain) ESP	Pablo de Lucas	13	1	2+10	1	1+0	0
11	FW	(Spain) ESP	Omar Sampedro	28	2	6+21	2	1+0	0
12	DF	(Spain) ESP	Neru	4	0	3+1	0	0+0	0
13	GK	(Spain) ESP	Roberto	41	0	41+0	0	0+0	0
14	DF	(Spain) ESP	Iván Hernández	35	0	33+2	0	0+0	0
15	DF	(Spain) ESP	Roberto Canella	36	1	36+0	1	0+0	0
16	DF	(Spain) ESP	Gerard Autet	34	0	32+2	0	0+0	0
17	FW	(Spain) ESP	Diego Castro	38	7	35+2	7	0+1	0
18	FW	(Spain) ESP	Luis Morán	29	4	5+23	4	1+0	0
19	MF	(Spain) ESP	Jorge Pina	16	0	7+8	0	1+0	0
20	DF	(Spain) ESP	Raúl Cámara	24	0	12+11	0	1+0	0
21	MF	(Spain) ESP	Kike Mateo	34	12	32+2	12	0+0	0
22	DF	(Spain) ESP	Sastre	38	2	34+3	2	1+0	0
23	FW	(Spain) ESP	David Barral	33	11	22+10	11	0+1	0
24	MF	(Spain) ESP	Sergio Matabuena	37	2	37+0	2	0+0	0
25	FW	(Colombia) COL	Carlos Hidalgo	7	1	3+4	1	0+0	0
28	MF	(Spain) ESP	Alberto Lora	1	0	0+1	0	0+0	0
29	FW	(Spain) ESP	Carlos Álvarez	1	0	0+1	0	0+0	0
Players who appeared for Sporting de Gijón no longer at the club:
9	FW	(Spain) ESP	David Karanka	8	0	2+5	0	1+0	0
