= 2009–10 Sporting de Gijón season =

Real Sporting
2009–10 season
- Chairman: Manuel Vega-Arango
- Manager: Manuel Preciado
- Stadium: El Molinón
- La Liga: 15th
- Copa del Rey: Round of 32
- Top goalscorer: Diego Castro (10)
- Average home league attendance: 20,137

The 2009–10 Sporting de Gijón season was the second successive season that the club played in La Liga, the highest tier of football in Spain.

== Overview ==
On 11 January 2010, Míchel was sold to Birmingham City for £3 million, becoming one of the highest transfers in the history of the Asturian club.

The club finally avoided relegation after achieving a 1–1 draw against Atlético Madrid at El Molinón in the 37th matchday.

== Squad ==
Note: Flags indicate national team as defined under FIFA eligibility rules; some limited exceptions apply. Players may hold more than one non-FIFA nationality.

No.	Pos.	Nation	Player
1	GK	ESP	Juan Pablo
2	DF	ESP	Alberto Botía
3	DF	ESP	José Ángel
4	DF	ESP	Andreu
5	MF	ESP	Alberto Rivera
6	MF	ESP	Carmelo
7	MF	ESP	Pedro
8	MF	SRB	Milan Smiljanić
9	FW	CRO	Mate Bilić
10	FW	ESP	Tati Maldonado
11	MF	ESP	Alberto Lora
12	DF	FRA	Grégory Arnolin

No.	Pos.	Nation	Player
13	GK	ESP	Iván Cuéllar
14	DF	ESP	Iván Hernández
15	DF	ESP	Roberto Canella (vice-captain)
16	DF	ESP	Gerard
17	FW	ESP	Diego Castro
18	FW	ESP	Luis Morán
19	MF	ESP	Diego Camacho
20	MF	ESP	Miguel de las Cuevas
21	FW	ESP	Kike Mateo
22	DF	ESP	Rafel Sastre (captain)
23	FW	ESP	David Barral
24	MF	ESP	Sergio Matabuena

=== From the youth squad ===
Note: Flags indicate national team as defined under FIFA eligibility rules; some limited exceptions apply. Players may hold more than one non-FIFA nationality.

No.	Pos.	Nation	Player
26	DF	ESP	Alain
28	MF	ESP	Marcos Landeira

No.	Pos.	Nation	Player
30	DF	ESP	Pedro Orfila
31	MF	ESP	Cristian Portilla

== Competitions ==
=== La Liga ===
==== Results by round ====
Round	1	2	3	4	5	6	7	8	9	10	11	12	13	14	15	16	17	18	19	20	21	22	23	24	25	26	27	28	29	30	31	32	33	34	35	36	37	38
Ground	A	H	A	H	A	H	A	H	A	H	A	H	A	H	A	H	H	A	H	H	A	H	A	H	A	H	A	H	A	H	A	H	A	H	A	A	H	A
Result	L	W	D	D	L	W	W	D	D	W	D	W	L	L	L	D	W	L	L	L	L	D	W	W	L	D	L	W	D	D	L	L	L	L	D	D	D	L
Position	20	12	10	12	14	9	7	7	7	7	7	7	7	9	10	10	9	9	10	11	13	13	11	10	12	12	12	12	12	12	11	12	14	14	14	15	14	15

Source: BDFútbol
A = Away; H = Home; W = Win; D = Draw; L = Loss

==== League table ====
Pos	Team	Pld	W	D	L	GF	GA	GD	Pts
13	Almería	38	10	12	16	43	55	−12	42
14	Zaragoza	38	10	11	17	46	64	−18	41
15	Sporting Gijón	38	9	13	16	36	51	−15	40
16	Racing Santander	38	9	12	17	42	59	−17	39
17	Málaga	38	7	16	15	42	48	−6	37

Source: LFP and Yahoo! Sport
Rules for classification: 1) points; 2) head-to-head points; 3) head-to-head goal difference; 4) head-to-head goals scored; 5) goal difference; 6) number of goals scored.

==== Matches ====
31 August 2009 1	Barcelona	3–0	Real Sporting	Camp Nou
	Bojan 18'; Keita 42'; Ibrahimović 82'	Report		Referee: Ramírez Domínguez

13 September 2009 2	Real Sporting	1–0	Almería	El Molinón
	Castro 5'	Summary		Referee: Delgado Ferreiro

20 September 2009 3	Valencia	2–2	Real Sporting	Mestalla
	Villa 24', 60'	Summary	Barral 7'; Míchel (red card) 25'; Arnolin 86'	Referee: Fernández Borbalán

24 September 2009 4	Real Sporting	1–1	Zaragoza	El Molinón
	Castro 29'; Arnolin (red card) 90'	Report	Aguilar 53'	Referee: Turienzo Álvarez

27 September 2009 5	Osasuna	1–0	Real Sporting	Reyno de Navarra
	Nekounam 25'	Summary		Referee: Estrada Fernández

4 October 2009 6	Real Sporting	4–1	Mallorca	El Molinón
	Morán 58'; De las Cuevas 59', 68'; Bilić 82'	Summary	Martí 12'	Referee: González González

18 October 2009 7	Athletic Bilbao	1–2	Real Sporting	San Mamés
	Toquero 81'	Summary	De las Cuevas 65', 76'	Referee: González Vázquez

24 October 2009 8	Real Sporting	0–0	Real Madrid	El Molinón
		Summary		Referee: Teixeira Vitienes

1 November 2009 9	Deportivo La Coruña	1–1	Real Sporting	Riazor
	Nouioui 41'	Summary	Castro 69'	Referee: Pérez Burrull

8 November 2009 10	Real Sporting	1–0	Espanyol	El Molinón
	Bilić 2'	Summary		Referee: Undiano Mallenco

22 November 2009 11	Xerez	0–0	Real Sporting	Chapín
		Summary		Referee: Mateu Lahoz

28 November 2009 12	Real Sporting	1–0	Villarreal	El Molinón
	Bilić 75'	Report	Gonzalo (red card) 73'	Referee: Clos Gómez

6 December 2009 13	Tenerife	2–1	Real Sporting	Heliodoro Rodríguez López
	Ricardo 55'; Nino 66'	Summary	Castro 4'	Referee: González González

13 December 2009 14	Real Sporting	0–1	Sevilla	El Molinón
		Summary	Kanouté 9'	Referee: Pérez Lasa

20 December 2009 15	Valladolid	2–1	Real Sporting	José Zorrilla
	Nivaldo 29'; Medunjanin 88'	Report	Morán 13'	Referee: Rubinos Pérez

3 January 2010 16	Real Sporting	2–2	Málaga	El Molinón
	Arnolin 45'; Canella 69'	Summary	Duda 9'; Weligton 60'	Referee: Estrada Fernández

10 January 2010 17	Real Sporting	1–0	Getafe	El Molinón
	Castro 38'	Summary		Referee: González Vázquez

17 January 2010 18	Atlético Madrid	3–2	Real Sporting	Vicente Calderón
	Forlán 13'; Assunção 53'; Ibrahima 66'	Summary	Castro 34'; Morán 90'	Referee: Teixeira Vitienes

24 January 2010 19	Real Sporting	0–1	Racing Santander	El Molinón
		Summary	Geijo 44'; Oriol (yellow card) 0' (yellow-red card) 89'	Referee: Iturralde González

30 January 2010 20	Real Sporting	0–1	Barcelona	El Molinón
		Summary	Pedro 29'	Referee: Paradas Romero

7 February 2010 21	Almería	3–1	Real Sporting	Mediterráneo
	Flores (red card) 12'; Crusat 15'; Cisma 42'; Guilherme 80'	Summary	Castro 12'; Barral (red card) 78'; Arnolin (red card) 80'	Referee: Ayza Gámez

13 February 2010 22	Real Sporting	1–1	Valencia	El Molinón
	Castro 5'	Summary	Mata 76'	Referee: Ramírez Domínguez

21 February 2010 23	Zaragoza	1–3	Real Sporting	La Romareda
	Arizmendi 89'	Summary	Bilić 38'; Morán 63'; Barral 90'	Referee: Mateu Lahoz

28 February 2010 24	Real Sporting	3–2	Osasuna	El Molinón
	De las Cuevas 17'; Barral 70'; Castro 80'	Summary	Nekounam 38'; Vadócz 49'	Referee: Álvarez Izquierdo

7 March 2010 25	Mallorca	3–0	Real Sporting	Ono Estadi
	Álvarez 12'; Víctor 75'; Webó 89'	Summary		Referee: Delgado Ferreiro

13 March 2010 26	Real Sporting	0–0	Athletic Bilbao	El Molinón
		Summary		Referee: Fernández Borbalán

20 March 2010 27	Real Madrid	3–1	Real Sporting	Santiago Bernabéu
	Van der Vaart 54'; Alonso 57'; Higuaín 68'	Summary	Barral 53'	Referee: Paradas Romero

23 March 2010 28	Real Sporting	2–1	Deportivo La Coruña	El Molinón
	Bilić 30'; Castro 90'	Summary	Aranzubia (red card) 10'; Lopo (red card) 10'	Referee: Rubinos Pérez

28 March 2010 29	Espanyol	0–0	Real Sporting	Cornellà-El Prat
		Report		Referee: Iturralde González

4 April 2010 30	Real Sporting	2–2	Xerez	El Molinón
	Rivera 13'; De las Cuevas 56'	Summary	Bermejo 52'; Alustiza 79'	Referee: González González

10 April 2010 31	Villarreal	1–0	Real Sporting	El Madrigal
	Godín 16'	Summary		Referee: Undiano Mallenco

13 April 2010 32	Real Sporting	0–2	Tenerife	El Molinón
		Summary	Román 70'; Alfaro 87'	Referee: Delgado Ferreiro

17 April 2010 33	Sevilla	3–0	Real Sporting	Ramón Sánchez Pizjuán
	Kanouté 7'; Luís Fabiano 53'; Cala 84'	Summary	Bilić (red card) 32'; José Ángel (red card) 79'	Referee: Velasco Carballo

25 April 2010 34	Real Sporting	0–2	Valladolid	El Molinón
	Maldonado (red card) 85'	Report	Manucho 80'; Del Horno (red card) 85'; Baraja 90'	Referee: Pérez Lasa

1 May 2010 36	Málaga	1–1	Real Sporting	La Rosaleda
	Caicedo 79'	Summary	Apoño 43' (o.g.)	Referee: Iturralde González

4 May 2010 36	Getafe	1–1	Real Sporting	Coliseum Alfonso Pérez
	Soldado 47'	Summary	De las Cuevas 17'	Referee: Mateu Lahoz

8 May 2010 37	Real Sporting	1–1	Atlético Madrid	Gijón
	De las Cuevas 57'	Report	Ibrahima 71'	Stadium: El Molinón; Referee: Estrada Fernández

16 May 2010 38	Racing Santander	2–0	Real Sporting	El Sardinero
	Tchité 34', 54'	Report		Referee: Delgado Ferreiro

=== Copa del Rey ===
==== Matches ====
27 October 2009 Round of 32; First Leg	Recreativo	1–1	Real Sporting	Huelva
	Candeias 4'	Report	Bilić 47'	Stadium: Nuevo Colombino; Referee: Velasco Carballo

10 November 2009 Round of 32; Second Leg	Real Sporting	1–1 (2–2 agg.) (2–4 p)	Recreativo	Gijón
	Barral 2'	Report	Barrales 29'	Stadium: El Molinón; Referee: González Vázquez

== Squad statistics ==
=== Appearances and goals ===
No.	Pos	Nat	Player	Total		La Liga		Copa del Rey	
No.	Pos	Nat	Player	Apps	Goals	Apps	Goals	Apps	Goals
1	GK	(Spain) ESP	Juan Pablo	38	0	38+0	0	0+0	0
2	DF	(Spain) ESP	Alberto Botía	27	0	26+0	0	1+0	0
3	DF	(Spain) ESP	José Ángel	15	0	10+3	0	2+0	0
4	DF	(Spain) ESP	Andreu	2	0	0+0	0	2+0	0
5	MF	(Spain) ESP	Alberto Rivera	35	1	34+0	1	0+1	0
6	MF	(Spain) ESP	Carmelo	29	0	11+16	0	1+1	0
7	MF	(Spain) ESP	Pedro	7	0	4+1	0	2+0	0
8	MF	(Serbia) SRB	Milan Smiljanić	6	0	5+1	0	0+0	0
9	FW	(Croatia) CRO	Mate Bilić	32	6	17+14	5	1+0	1
10	FW	(Spain) ESP	Tati Maldonado	17	0	6+9	0	1+1	0
11	MF	(Spain) ESP	Alberto Lora	32	0	31+1	0	0+0	0
12	DF	(France) FRA	Grégory Arnolin	35	2	35+0	2	0+0	0
13	GK	(Spain) ESP	Iván Cuéllar	2	0	0+0	0	2+0	0
14	DF	(Spain) ESP	Iván Hernández	12	0	7+3	0	2+0	0
15	DF	(Spain) ESP	Roberto Canella	28	1	28+0	1	0+0	0
16	DF	(Portugal) POR	Gerard	9	0	8+0	0	1+0	0
17	FW	(Spain) ESP	Diego Castro	35	10	31+4	10	0+0	0
18	FW	(Spain) ESP	Luis Morán	29	4	21+7	4	0+1	0
19	MF	(Spain) ESP	Diego Camacho	24	0	16+7	0	1+0	0
20	MF	(Spain) ESP	Miguel de las Cuevas	39	8	32+5	8	0+2	0
21	MF	(Spain) ESP	Kike Mateo	18	0	2+14	0	2+0	0
22	DF	(Spain) ESP	Rafel Sastre	16	0	11+3	0	2+0	0
23	FW	(Spain) ESP	David Barral	34	5	23+10	4	1+0	1
24	MF	(Spain) ESP	Sergio Matabuena	15	0	5+9	0	1+0	0
28	MF	(Spain) ESP	Marcos Landeira	1	0	1+0	0	0+0	0
31	MF	(Spain) ESP	Cristian Portilla	5	0	3+1	0	1+0	0
37	MF	(Spain) ESP	Sergio Álvarez	2	0	1+0	0	1+0	0
38	MF	(Spain) ESP	Juan Muñiz	2	1	0+1	0	0+1	1
Players who appeared for Sporting de Gijón no longer at the club:
8	MF	(Spain) ESP	Míchel	13	0	12+1	0	0+0	0
