= Juan Landaida =

Argentine footballer

Personal information
- Full name: Juan Manuel Landaida
- Date of birth: 15 September 1976 (age 50)
- Place of birth: Buenos Aires, Argentina
- Height: 1.85 m (6 ft 1 in)
- Position: Central defender

Senior career*
Years	Team	Apps	(Gls)
1995–1996	Nacional de Asunción	?	(?)
1996–1998	Huracán de Corrientes	11+	(0+)
- ?
2001–2005	Liverpool de Montevideo	?	(?)
2004–2005	→ Venezia (loan)	32	(2)
2006–2007	Triestina	12	(0)
2006–2007	→ Sambenedettese (loan)	27	(1)
2007–2011	Benevento	64	(1)
- * Club domestic league appearances and goals

Juan Manuel Landaida (born 15 September 1976) is a retired Argentine footballer.

== Biography ==
Landaida started his career in Paraguay, then played for Huracán de Corrientes at Primera División Argentina 1996–97. He remained at Corrientes for Primera B Nacional 1997–98,

Landaida then left for Uruguayan side Liverpool de Montevideo. In August 2004, along with Carlos Andrés García and Gonzalo Vicente were loaned to Serie B side Venezia. Venezia had also signed Horacio Erpen and Damián Macaluso from Primera División de Uruguay, which all had passport of European Union member as second nationality. After the bankrupt of the Venice club, he returned to Montevideo.

In January 2006, he signed a 2 1/2-year contract with Serie B side Triestina, which the club alsosigned Horacio Erpen. He just played 12 league matches in the second half of 2005–06 season.

In August 2006, he joined Serie C1 side Sambenedettese on loan.

In the next season, he signed a 2-year contract with Benevento. He played 23 league matches for the Serie C2 champion. Late his contract was extended and played regularly in Lega Pro Prima Divisione.
