= David Barral =

Spanish professional footballer (born 1983)

Personal information
- Full name: David Barral Torres
- Date of birth: 10 May 1983 (age 43)
- Place of birth: San Fernando, Spain
- Height: 1.83 m (6 ft 0 in)
- Position: Striker

Youth career
- San Servando
- 1999–2002: San Fernando

Senior career*
Years	Team	Apps	(Gls)
2002–2003	Real Madrid C		
2003–2006	Real Madrid B	53	(9)
2003–2004	→ Fuenlabrada (loan)	34	(17)
2006–2012	Sporting Gijón	201	(48)
2012–2013	Orduspor	27	(4)
2013–2015	Levante	67	(18)
2015	Al Dhafra	10	(3)
2016–2017	Granada	22	(0)
2017	APOEL	12	(3)
2017–2018	Cádiz	28	(6)
2018	Tokushima Vortis	16	(9)
2019–2020	Racing Santander	26	(7)
2021–2022	Internacional Madrid	42	(11)
Total		538	(135)
- * Club domestic league appearances and goals

David Barral Torres (born 10 May 1983) is a Spanish former professional footballer who played as a striker.

He achieved La Liga totals of 221 games and 46 goals over eight seasons, with Sporting de Gijón, Levante and Granada. He added 136 matches and 30 goals in the Segunda División, and also played in Turkey, the United Arab Emirates, Cyprus and Japan.

== Club career ==
Born in San Fernando, Province of Cádiz, Andalusia, Barral started playing professionally in the lower divisions, with Real Madrid's B and C teams, with a loan stint at neighbouring CF Fuenlabrada in between. In the 2006–07 season he moved to Sporting de Gijón where, in his second year, he formed a formidable attacking partnership with Mate Bilić (arrived in January 2008) to help the Asturias side to return to La Liga after a 10-year absence.

Barral scored his first top-flight goal on 26 October 2008, from a penalty in a 3–0 away win against Deportivo de La Coruña. During the campaign he again paired up with Bilić for a total of 22 league goals, and scored a crucial one in the last matchday – a 2–1 home victory over Recreativo de Huelva – as Sporting avoided relegation.

On 20 March 2010, Barral scored at former club Real Madrid: he beat the offside trap and cut inside from the right hand, before firing past Iker Casillas for the game's first, but the hosts turned the score around for a final 3–1 win.

In 2010–11, Barral continued to battle with Bilić for first-choice status, with Sporting also having acquired Gastón Sangoy; coach Manuel Preciado often fielded only one striker. On 15 January 2011, in the 19th round, he opened his account, at home against Hércules CF (2–0). In the next league match, also at El Molinón, he also found the net, for the game's only goal against Atlético Madrid. The following month, he helped his team to a 1–1 home draw with FC Barcelona after a fine individual effort early in the first half.

In the 2011–12 season, Barral scored nine goals from 30 appearances (best in the squad), but it was not enough to prevent Sporting from being relegated after five years. On 5 July 2012, aged 29, he moved abroad for the first time, signing with Orduspor of the Turkish Süper Lig.

Barral returned to his homeland in the summer of 2013, penning a two-year deal with Levante UD. On 7 February 2015, he became the first national player to score a hat-trick in a year after Athletic Bilbao's Aritz Aduriz, in a 4–1 home win over Málaga CF.

On 5 July 2015, Barral signed for Al Dhafra FC in the United Arab Emirates after his contract with Levante expired. On 24 January of the following year, he returned to Spain and its top division after agreeing to an 18-month deal at Granada CF.

After being involved in a scuffle with teammate Isaac Cuenca during a meal at the club's sports city, in late November 2016, Barral was suspended indefinitely. On 16 January 2017, he signed an 18-month contract with Cypriot First Division champions APOEL FC. He scored twice on his debut six days later, in his team's 7–0 home defeat of AEZ Zakakiou for the domestic league.

On 27 May 2017, Barral's contract was mutually terminated, and he joined Cádiz CF on a one-year deal on 12 July. Still in that year, on 19 November, he scored in his very first match at Sporting's home ground after leaving, helping the visitors to a 3–0 victory.

On 15 January 2019, after a brief spell in the J2 League with Tokushima Vortis, the 35-year-old Barral returned to Spain and signed with Racing de Santander until 30 June. He achieved promotion to the second tier in his first season, scoring six goals.

Barral joined third-tier Internacional de Madrid on 19 January 2021, becoming the first player ever to be bought using cryptocurrency as Bitcoin was used to sign him instead of conventional currency. In summer 2022, as the club was dealing with serious bureaucratic and financial problems, he announced his retirement.

== International career ==
Barral was not capped by Spain at any level. He played for the Andalusia autonomous team on 7 June 2013 against their Madrid equivalent on the centenary of the latter's Football Federation, and scored both goals of a 2–1 win in Vallecas.

== Career statistics ==
As of match played 9 May 2021

Appearances and goals by club, season and competition
Club	Season	League			National Cup		Continental		Other		Total	
Club	Season	Division	Apps	Goals	Apps	Goals	Apps	Goals	Apps	Goals	Apps	Goals
Real Madrid B	2004–05	Segunda División B	26	6	—		—		2 (Note: Appearances in Segunda División B play-offs)	0	28	6
Real Madrid B	2005–06	Segunda División	27	3	—		—		—		27	3
Real Madrid B	Total		53	9	0	0	0	0	2	0	55	9
Fuenlabrada (loan)	2003–04	Segunda División B	34	17	—		—		—		34	17
Sporting Gijón	2006–07	Segunda División	37	9	1	1	—		—		38	10
Sporting Gijón	2007–08	Segunda División	32	11	1	0	—		—		33	11
Sporting Gijón	2008–09	La Liga	35	10	6	4	—		—		41	14
Sporting Gijón	2009–10	La Liga	33	4	1	1	—		—		34	5
Sporting Gijón	2010–11	La Liga	34	5	1	1	—		—		35	6
Sporting Gijón	2011–12	La Liga	30	9	2	0	—		—		32	9
Sporting Gijón	Total		201	48	12	7	0	0	0	0	213	55
Orduspor	2012–13	Süper Lig	27	4	2	2	—		—		29	6
Levante	2013–14	La Liga	32	7	4	1	—		—		36	8
Levante	2014–15	La Liga	35	11	3	2	—		—		38	13
Levante	Total		67	18	7	3	0	0	0	0	74	21
Al Dhafra	2015–16	UAE Pro League	10	3	5	3	—		—		15	6
Granada	2015–16	La Liga	14	0	0	0	—		—		14	0
Granada	2016–17	La Liga	8	0	0	0	—		—		8	0
Granada	Total		22	0	0	0	0	0	0	0	22	0
APOEL	2016–17	Cypriot First Division	12	3	3	2	3 (Note: Appearances in UEFA Europa League)	0	—		18	5
Cádiz	2017–18	Segunda División	28	6	6	3	—		—		34	9
Tokushima Vortis	2018	J2 League	16	9	0	0	—		—		16	9
Racing Santander	2018–19	Segunda División B	14	6	0	0	—		4	0	18	6
Racing Santander	2019–20	Segunda División	12	1	1	0	—		—		13	1
Racing Santander	Total		26	7	1	0	0	0	4	0	31	7
Internacional Madrid	2020–21	Segunda División B	13	2	0	0	—		—		13	2
Career total			509	126	36	20	3	0	6	0	554	146

== Honours ==
APOEL

- Cypriot First Division: 2016–17
