= 2016–17 FK Qarabağ season =

Qarabağ
2016–17 season
- Chairman: Tahir Gözal
- Manager: Gurban Gurbanov
- Stadium: Azersun Arena
- Premier League: 1st
- Azerbaijan Cup: Champions
- Champions League: 3rd qualifying round vs Viktoria Plzeň
- Europa League: Group Stage
- Top goalscorer: League: Dino Ndlovu (10); All: Dino Ndlovu (15)
Home colours	Away colours	Third colours

The Qarabağ 2016–17 season was Qarabağ's 24th Azerbaijan Premier League season, of which they were defending champions, and was their ninth season under manager Gurban Gurbanov. They won the League for the fourth season in a row on 16 April 2017, reaching the final of the Azerbaijan Cup and the group stages of the UEFA Europa League having been eliminated from the UEFA Champions League in the 3rd qualifying round by Viktoria Plzeň on away goals.

== Squad ==
As of 27 January 2017

Note: Flags indicate national team as defined under FIFA eligibility rules; some limited exceptions apply. Players may hold more than one non-FIFA nationality.

No.	Pos.	Nation	Player
1	GK	SRB	Bojan Šaranov
2	DF	AZE	Gara Garayev
5	DF	AZE	Maksim Medvedev (vice-captain)
6	FW	RSA	Dino Ndlovu
8	MF	ESP	Míchel
10	MF	MKD	Muarem Muarem
11	FW	AZE	Mahir Madatov
12	GK	AZE	Shahrudin Mahammadaliyev
13	GK	BIH	Ibrahim Šehić
14	DF	AZE	Rashad Sadygov (captain)
15	MF	AZE	Rahid Amirguliyev
18	MF	AZE	Ilgar Gurbanov
20	MF	BRA	Richard Almeida
21	DF	AZE	Arif Dashdemirov

No.	Pos.	Nation	Player
22	MF	AZE	Afran Ismayilov
23	DF	AZE	Elgun Ulukhanov
25	DF	ALB	Ansi Agolli
28	DF	AZE	İbrahim Aslanli
32	DF	AZE	Elvin Yunuszade
33	MF	AZE	Eltun Turabov
34	MF	AZE	Salman Jafarov
44	FW	AZE	Aghabala Ramazanov
55	DF	AZE	Badavi Guseynov
71	FW	AZE	Vüqar Nadirov
77	MF	AZE	Elshan Abdullayev
91	MF	AZE	Joshgun Diniyev
94	GK	TUR	Halit Oghuzhan
99	MF	ESP	Dani Quintana

=== Out on loan ===
Note: Flags indicate national team as defined under FIFA eligibility rules; some limited exceptions apply. Players may hold more than one non-FIFA nationality.

No.	Pos.	Nation	Player
—	GK	AZE	Emil Balayev (at (Azerbaijan) Sabail)
—	DF	AZE	Shahriyar Aliyev (at (Azerbaijan) Kapaz)
—	DF	AZE	Eltun Yagublu (at (Azerbaijan) Neftchi Baku)

No.	Pos.	Nation	Player
—	DF	AZE	Azer Salahli (at (Azerbaijan) Sumgayit)
—	MF	AZE	Vugar Mustafayev (at (Azerbaijan) Zira)

== Transfers ==
=== Summer ===
In: Note: Flags indicate national team as defined under FIFA eligibility rules; some limited exceptions apply. Players may hold more than one non-FIFA nationality.

No.	Pos.	Nation	Player
1	GK	SRB	Bojan Šaranov (from (Serbia) Partizan)
6	FW	RSA	Dino Ndlovu (from (Cyprus) Anorthosis Famagusta)
17	MF	AZE	Namig Alasgarov (loan return from (Azerbaijan) Kapaz)
21	DF	AZE	Arif Dashdemirov (from (Azerbaijan) Gabala)
71	FW	AZE	Vüqar Nadirov (from (Azerbaijan) Inter Baku)

Out: Note: Flags indicate national team as defined under FIFA eligibility rules; some limited exceptions apply. Players may hold more than one non-FIFA nationality.

No.	Pos.	Nation	Player
1	GK	AZE	Farhad Valiyev (to (Azerbaijan) Sumgayit)
4	DF	AZE	Eltun Yagublu (loan to (Azerbaijan) Neftchi Baku)
6	MF	AZE	Vugar Mustafayev (loan to (Azerbaijan) Zira)
7	MF	AZE	Namiq Yusifov (retired)
19	DF	AZE	Azer Salahli (loan to (Azerbaijan) Sumgayit)
67	MF	MAR	Alharbi El Jadeyaoui
77	MF	AZE	Javid Taghiyev (to (Azerbaijan) Zira)
90	FW	SWE	Samuel Armenteros (to (Netherlands) Heracles Almelo)

=== Winter ===
In: Note: Flags indicate national team as defined under FIFA eligibility rules; some limited exceptions apply. Players may hold more than one non-FIFA nationality.

No.	Pos.	Nation	Player
44	FW	AZE	Aghabala Ramazanov (from (Azerbaijan) Inter Baku)
77	MF	AZE	Elshan Abdullayev (from (Azerbaijan) Neftchi Baku)

Out: Note: Flags indicate national team as defined under FIFA eligibility rules; some limited exceptions apply. Players may hold more than one non-FIFA nationality.

No.	Pos.	Nation	Player
9	FW	BRA	Reynaldo (to (Turkey) Adanaspor)
17	FW	AZE	Namig Alasgarov (to (Azerbaijan) Neftchi Baku)
64	GK	AZE	Emil Balayev (loan to (Azerbaijan) Sabail)

== Friendlies ==
25 June 2016	Wacker Innsbruck (Austria)	1 – 0	(Azerbaijan) Qarabağ	Kössen, Austria
AZT (UTC+4)	Jamnig 41'	Report

28 June 2016	Zenit Saint Petersburg (Russia)	0 – 1	(Azerbaijan) Qarabağ	Kössen, Austria
AZT (UTC+4)		Report	Amirguliyev 81'

1 July 2016	Skënderbeu (Albania)	1 – 0	(Azerbaijan) Qarabağ	Kössen, Austria
AZT (UTC+4)	Radaš 45'	Report

6 July 2016	Qarabağ (Azerbaijan)	4 – 0	(Azerbaijan) Zira	Baku, Azerbaijan
AZT (UTC+4)	Reynaldo 37', 59', 87'; Quintana 89'	Report		Stadium: Tofiq Bahramov Republican Stadium

15 January 2017	Skënderbeu Korçë (Albania)	–	(Azerbaijan) Qarabağ	Turkey
AZT (UTC+4)		[ Report]

January 2017	–	(Azerbaijan) Qarabağ	Turkey
AZT (UTC+4)	[ Report]

January 2017	–	(Azerbaijan) Qarabağ	Turkey
AZT (UTC+4)	[ Report]

January 2017	–	(Azerbaijan) Qarabağ	Turkey
AZT (UTC+4)	[ Report]

2017	–	(Azerbaijan) Qarabağ	Turkey
AZT (UTC+4)	[ Report]

== Competitions ==
=== Azerbaijan Premier League ===
==== Results summary ====
Overall								Home						Away					
Pld	W	D	L	GF	GA	GD	Pts	W	D	L	GF	GA	GD	W	D	L	GF	GA	GD
28	19	5	4	46	14	+32	62	10	3	1	25	5	+20	9	2	3	21	9	+12

Last updated: 29 April 2017.
Source: See Results

==== Results ====
7 August 2016 1	Inter Baku	2 – 1	Qarabağ	Baku
20:00 AZT (UTC+4)	O.Sadigli (yellow card) 44'; Guliyev (yellow card) 52'; Abışov (yellow card) 69' (goal) 70', 75'; Hajiyev (yellow card) 90+1'; Aghayev (yellow card) 90+3'	Report	Reynaldo 11'	Stadium: Inter Arena; Attendance: 2,200; Referee: Aliyar Ağayev

11 August 2016 2	Sumgayit	0 – 2	Qarabağ	Sumqayit
19:00 AZT (UTC+4)		Report	Muarem 52'; Quintana 84'	Stadium: Kapital Bank Arena; Attendance: 1,320; Referee: Revan Həmzəzadə

21 August 2016 3	Qarabağ	3 – 0	Neftchi Baku	Masazır
20:00 AZT (UTC+4)	Jairo 24' (o.g.); Madatov 47'; El Jadeyaoui 80'	Report		Stadium: Alinja Arena; Attendance: 2,500; Referee: Aliyar Ağayev

9 September 2016 4	Qarabağ	6 – 0	AZAL	Masazır
18:30 AZT (UTC+4)	Reynaldo 2', 64'; Medvedev 42', 66' (yellow card) 50'; Míchel 45+1'; Quintana 59'	Report	D.Janelidze (yellow card) 24'; E.Manafov (yellow card) 72'	Stadium: Alinja Arena; Attendance: 500; Referee: Orphan Mammadov

19 September 2016 5	Qarabağ	2 – 0	Zira	Masazır
20:00 AZT (UTC+4)	Amirguliyev 20', 37'; Míchel (yellow card) 90+2'	Report	Mammadov (yellow card) 22'	Stadium: Alinja Arena; Attendance: 1,100; Referee: Rauf Jabbarov

25 September 2016 6	Kapaz	1 – 1	Qarabağ	Ganja
15:30 AZT (UTC+4)	Serginho (yellow card) 31'; V.Beybalayev (yellow card) 38'; Dário 54'	Report	Medvedev (yellow card) 21'; Reynaldo 75'; Míchel (yellow card) 82'; Richard (yellow card) 86'	Stadium: Ganja City Stadium; Attendance: 14,238; Referee: Rahim Həsənov

2 October 2016 7	Gabala	2 – 0	Qarabağ	Qabala
19:00 AZT (UTC+4)	Ozobić 11'; Dabo 14'; Stanković (yellow card) 33'; E.Jamalov (yellow card) 75'; Abbasov (yellow card) 76'	Report	Ndlovu (yellow card) 33'; Richard (yellow card) 77'	Stadium: Gabala City Stadium; Attendance: 3,000; Referee: Rahim Həsənov

15 October 2016 8	Qarabağ	3 – 0	Sumgayit	Baku
18:30 AZT (UTC+4)	Reynaldo (yellow card) 24'; Míchel 42'; Gurbanov 44'; Ndlovu 90+3'	Report	Y.Nabiyev (yellow card) 41'	Stadium: Azersun Arena; Attendance: 500; Referee: Aliyar Ağayev

25 October 2016 9	Neftchi Baku	0 – 2	Qarabağ	Baku
19:00 AZT (UTC+4)	Castillo (yellow card) 43'; Jairo (yellow card) 67'; Hajiyev (yellow card) 85'; Țîră (red card) 90+2'	Report	Amirguliyev 29'; Quintana (yellow card) 83'; Ndlovu (yellow card) 85'; Jairo 90' (o.g.)	Stadium: Bakcell Arena; Attendance: 1,500; Referee: Ramil Diniyev

29 October 2016 10	AZAL	0 – 1	Qarabağ	Baku
18:00 AZT (UTC+4)	T.Hümbatov (yellow card) 28'; K.Mirzayev (yellow card) 33'; Jafarguliyev (yellow card) 55'	Report	Guseynov (yellow card) 37'; Muarem 63'	Stadium: AZAL Arena; Attendance: 1,000; Referee: Orkhan Məmmədov

6 November 2016 11	Zira	0 – 2	Qarabağ	Zirə
16:00 AZT (UTC+4)	Lourenço (yellow card) 73'; Đurić (yellow card) 77'; Mustafayev (yellow card) 90+1'	Report	Quintana 69'; Yunuszade 80'	Stadium: Zira Olympic Sport Complex Stadium; Attendance: 1,000; Referee: Ramil Diniyev

19 November 2016 12	Qarabağ	1 – 0	Kapaz	Baku
18:00 AZT (UTC+4)	Ndlovu 17'; Quintana (yellow card) 32'; Yunuszade (yellow card) 37'; Medvedev (yellow card) 61'; Garayev (yellow card) 73'	Report	N.Gurbanov (yellow card) 25'; Renan (yellow card) 70'	Stadium: Azersun Arena; Attendance: 600; Referee: Fariz Yusifov

29 November 2016 13	Qarabağ	2 – 1	Gabala	Baku
19:00 AZT (UTC+4)	Medvedev (yellow card) 74'; Richard 87' (pen.) (yellow card) 90+4' (red card) 90+4'; Quintana (yellow card) 90+2'; Ndlovu 90+4'; Šehić (yellow card) 90+4'	Report	Ozobić 64'; Qurbanov (yellow card) 72'; Ricardinho (yellow card) 90'; Abbasov (yellow card) 90+2'	Stadium: Azersun Arena; Attendance: 3,800; Referee: Rahim Həsənov

17 December 2016 14	Qarabağ	0 – 0	Inter Baku	Baku
17:00 AZT (UTC+4)	Quintana (yellow card) 44'; Garayev (yellow card) 62'	Report	Aliyev (yellow card) 32'; Guliyev (yellow card) 37'; Khizanishvili (yellow card) 82'	Stadium: Azersun Arena; Attendance: 500; Referee: Fariz Yusifov

29 January 2017 15	Qarabag	1 – 1	Neftchi Baku	Baku
17:30 AZT (UTC+4)	Ramazanov (yellow card) 60'; Ndlovu 72' (pen.)	Report	Imamverdiyev 13' (yellow card) 82'; Navalovski (yellow card) 50'; Hajiyev (yellow card) 67'; F.Muradbayli (yellow card) 81'	Stadium: Azersun Arena; Attendance: 3,200; Referee: Ramil Diniyev

3 February 2017 16	AZAL	1 – 2	Qarabağ	Baku
15:00 AZT (UTC+4)	Abdullayev 7'; Tounkara (yellow card) 11' (yellow-red card) 45+3'; E.Huseynov (yellow card) 90'	Report	Diniyev (yellow card) 6' (goal) 63'; Medvedev 60'; Ramazanov (yellow card) 78'	Stadium: AZAL Arena; Attendance: 650; Referee: Orkhan Məmmədov

8 February 2017 17	Qarabağ	2 – 0	Zira	Baku
17:30 AZT (UTC+4)	Ismayilov 13'; Ndlovu 47'; Ramazanov (yellow card) 51'	Report		Stadium: Azersun Arena; Attendance: 700; Referee: Rauf Jabbarov

12 February 2017 18	Kapaz	0 – 1	Qarabağ	Ganja
14:30 AZT (UTC+4)		Report	Madatov 65'; Ramazanov (yellow card) 86'	Stadium: Ganja City Stadium; Attendance: 2,000; Referee: Omar Paşayev

19 February 2017 19	Gabala	2 – 0	Qarabağ	Qabala
17:30 AZT (UTC+4)	Zenjov 30'; Kvekveskiri (yellow card) 58'; Ozobić 68'	Report	Míchel (yellow card) 36'	Stadium: Gabala City Stadium; Attendance: 4,500; Referee: Fariz Yusifov

28 February 2017 20	Qarabağ	0 – 1	Inter Baku	Baku
18:00 AZT (UTC+4)	Gurbanov (yellow card) 50'; Diniyev (yellow card) 90+3'	Report	F.Bayramov (yellow card) 34'; Qirtimov (yellow card) 38'; Khizanishvili 72'; Hajiyev (yellow card) 79'	Stadium: Azersun Arena; Attendance: 1,200; Referee: Elvin Əsgərov

4 March 2017 21	Sumgayit	0 – 4	Qarabağ	Sumqayit
16:00 AZT (UTC+4)	B.Mustafazade (yellow card) 24'; Chernyshev (yellow card) 58'; Kurbanov (yellow card) 62'	Report	Míchel 23'; Richard 45+1' (pen.); Muarem 49'; Guseynov 60'	Stadium: Kapital Bank Arena; Attendance: 2,500; Referee: Ramil Diniyev

14 March 2017 22	Qarabağ	1 – 0	AZAL	Baku
17:00 AZT (UTC+4)	Diniyev (yellow card) 58'; Sadygov (yellow card) 60'; Ndlovu 68'; Garayev (yellow card) 88'	Report	Taouil (yellow card) 55'	Stadium: Azersun Arena; Attendance: 750; Referee: Rahim Həsənov

19 March 2017 23	Zira	0 – 0	Qarabağ	Zirə
18:30 AZT (UTC+4)	Naghiyev (yellow card) 49'; Latifu (yellow card) 65' (yellow-red card) 66'; Mammadov (yellow card) 69'; Nazirov (yellow card) 89'; V.Igbekoi (yellow card) 90'	Report	Diniyev (yellow card) 42'; Agolli (yellow card) 65'	Stadium: Zira Olympic Sport Complex Stadium; Attendance: 1,300; Referee: Ramil Diniyev

2 April 2017 24	Qarabağ	2 – 1	Kapaz	Baku
18:30 AZT (UTC+4)	Ndlovu 42'; Míchel 47'; Medvedev (yellow card) 90'	Report	K.Diniyev 26'	Stadium: Tofiq Bahramov Republican Stadium; Attendance: 500; Referee: Rauf Jabbarov

9 April 2017 25	Qarabağ	0 – 0	Gabala	Baku
20:30 AZT (UTC+4)	Agolli (yellow card) 53'	Report	Abbasov (yellow card) 90'; Mutallimov (yellow card) 90+3'	Stadium: Tofiq Bahramov Republican Stadium; Attendance: 8,000; Referee: Fariz Yusifov

16 April 2017 26	Inter Baku	0 – 3	Qarabağ	Baku
18:30 AZT (UTC+4)	Seyidov (yellow card) 43'	Report	Madatov 4'; Ndlovu 54', 78'	Stadium: Inter Arena; Attendance: 1,234; Referee: Rahim Həsənov

23 April 2017 27	Qarabağ	2 – 1	Sumgayit	Baku
17:00 AZT (UTC+4)	Muarem 12' (yellow card) 89'; Medvedev (yellow card) 78'; Guseynov (yellow card) 81'; E.Abdullayev 82'; Yunuszade (yellow card) 90+3'	Report	K.Najafov (yellow card) 31'; Yunanov 83'; A.Mehdiyev (yellow card) 87'	Stadium: Azersun Arena; Attendance: 1,800; Referee: Elvin Əsgərov

29 April 2017 28	Neftchi Baku	1 – 2	Qarabağ	Baku
17:00 AZT (UTC+4)	M.Isayev (yellow card) 40'; Herrera 90'	Report	Ndlovu 48'; Abışov 60' (o.g.)	Stadium: Bakcell Arena; Attendance: 500; Referee: Omar Paşayev

==== League table ====
Pos	Team	Pld	W	D	L	GF	GA	GD	Pts	Qualification or relegation
1	Qarabağ (C)	28	19	5	4	46	14	+32	62	Qualification for the Champions League second qualifying round (Note: Qarabağ qualified for the Europa League second qualifying round by winning the 2016–17 Azerbaijan Cup. However, since they already qualified for European competition based on their league position, the spot awarded to the cup winners was passed down the league.)
2	Gabala	28	14	10	4	48	21	+27	52	Qualification for the Europa League second qualifying round
3	Inter Baku	28	11	10	7	39	33	+6	43	Qualification for the Europa League first qualifying round
4	Zira	28	10	9	9	29	26	+3	39	Qualification for the Europa League first qualifying round
5	Kapaz	28	9	9	10	24	27	−3	36	

Source: PFL (in Azerbaijani), UEFA, Soccerway
Rules for classification: 1) Points; 2) Head-to-head points; 3) Head-to-head goal difference; 4) Head-to-head goals scored; 5) Head-to-head away goals scored (only if two teams); 6) Goal difference; 7) Goals scored.
(C) Champions

=== Azerbaijan Cup ===
3 December 2016 Second Round	Qarabağ	5 – 0	Sabail	Baku
17:00 AZT (UTC+4)	Ndlovu 21', 53'; Quintana 33'; Míchel 55'; Diniyev 81'	Report		Stadium: Azersun Arena; Attendance: 700; Referee: Omar Paşayev

13 December 2016 Quarterfinal First Leg	Qarabağ	6 – 0	Sumgayit	Baku
18:00 AZT (UTC+4)	Richard 25' (pen.); Ndlovu 34' (pen.); Diniyev 40'; Madatov 64', 78'; Alasgarov 67'	Report	Hüseynov (yellow card) 34'; B.Hasanalizade (yellow card) 54'; K.Najafov (yellow card) 68'	Stadium: Azersun Arena; Attendance: 500; Referee: Orkhan Mammadov

21 December 2016 Quarterfinal Second Leg	Sumgayit	2 – 5 (2 – 11 agg.)	Qarabağ	Sumgayit
15:00 AZT (UTC+4)	Yunanov 14', 80'; B.Hasanalizade (yellow card) 66'; N.Abilayev (yellow card) 72'	Report	Alasgarov 8', 16', 82'; Nadirov 70'; Amirguliyev 90'	Stadium: Kapital Bank Arena; Attendance: 950; Referee: Rauf Jabbarov

30 March 2017 Semifinal First Leg	Neftchi Baku	0 – 2	Qarabağ	Baku
19:30 AZT (UTC+4)	Petrov (yellow card) 48'	Report	Muarem 13'; Ndlovu 28'; E.Abdullayev (yellow card) 72'; Mahammadaliyev (yellow card) 89'	Stadium: Bakcell Arena; Attendance: 3,800; Referee: Aliyar Ağayev

5 April 2017 Semifinal Second Leg	Qarabağ	0 – 0 (2 – 0 agg.)	Neftchi Baku	Baku
19:30 AZT (UTC+4)		Report	Petrov (yellow card) 19'	Stadium: Tofiq Bahramov Republican Stadium; Attendance: 3,500; Referee: Aliyar Ağayev

==== Final ====
5 May 2017	Qarabağ	2 – 0	Gabala	Nakhchivan
16:00 AZT (UTC+4)	Madatov (yellow card) 28' (goal) 52'; Abbasov 68' (o.g.)	Report	Stanković (yellow card) 79'	Stadium: Nakhchivan City Stadium; Attendance: 12,800; Referee: Fariz Yusifov

=== UEFA Champions League ===
==== Qualifying phase ====
12 July 2016 2nd qualifying round 1st leg	Qarabağ (Azerbaijan)	2 – 0	(Luxembourg) F91 Dudelange	Baku, Azerbaijan
21:00 AZT (UTC+4)	Richard 11' (pen.), 28'; Quintana (yellow card) 34'; Medvedev (yellow card) 39'; Garayev (yellow card) 55'	Report	Mélisse (yellow card) 10'; Malget (yellow card) 24'; Pokar (yellow card) 49'	Stadium: Tofiq Bahramov Stadium, Baku; Attendance: 18,600; Referee: Orel Grinfeeld (Israel)

19 July 2016 2nd qualifying round 2nd leg	F91 Dudelange (Luxembourg)	1 – 1 (1 – 3 agg.)	(Azerbaijan) Qarabağ	Dudelange, Luxembourg
20:00 AZT (UTC+4)	Dikaba (yellow card) 24'; N'Diaye 71'; Pokar (yellow card) 84'	Report	Guseynov (yellow card) 18'; Míchel (yellow card) 27'; Sadygov (yellow card) 65'; Diniyev (yellow card) 88'; Reynaldo 90+4'	Stadium: Stade Jos Nosbaum; Attendance: 891; Referee: Kevin Clancy (Scotland)

26 July 2016 3rd qualifying round 1st leg	Viktoria Plzeň (Czech Republic)	0 – 0	(Azerbaijan) Qarabağ	Plzeň, Czech Republic
22:15 AZT (UTC+4)	Baránek (yellow card) 28' (yellow-red card) 75'	Report	Madatov (yellow card) 28'	Stadium: Doosan Arena; Attendance: 10,269; Referee: Aleksandar Stavrev (Macedonia)

2 August 2016 3rd qualifying round 2nd leg	Qarabağ (Azerbaijan)	1 – 1 (1 – 1(a) agg.)	(Czech Republic) Viktoria Plzeň	Baku, Azerbaijan
20:30 AZT (UTC+4)	Medvedev (yellow card) 27'; Muarem 28'; Garayev (yellow card) 72'; Míchel (yellow card) 87'	Report	Ďuriš (yellow card) 69'; Krmenčík 85'; Krmenčík (yellow card) 90+1'; Bakoš (yellow card) 90+5'	Stadium: Tofiq Bahramov Stadium, Baku; Attendance: 30,792; Referee: Hüseyin Göçek (Turkey)

=== UEFA Europa League ===
==== Qualifying rounds ====
18 August 2016 Play-off round 1st leg	IFK Göteborg (Sweden)	1 – 0	(Azerbaijan) Qarabağ	Gothenburg, Sweden
21:00 AZT (UTC+4)	Pettersson (yellow card) 26'; Albæk 56'; Smedberg-Dalence (yellow card) 90'	Report	Sadygov (yellow card) 13'; Richard (yellow card) 89'	Stadium: Gamla Ullevi; Attendance: 11,458; Referee: Paweł Raczkowski (Poland)

25 August 2016 Play-off round 2nd leg	Qarabağ (Azerbaijan)	3 – 0 (3 – 1 agg.)	(Sweden) IFK Göteborg	Baku, Azerbaijan
21:30 AZT (UTC+4)	Sadygov 19' (yellow card) 90+3'; Muarem 26'; Quintana 51'; Medvedev (yellow card) 62'	Report	Eriksson (yellow card) 9'	Stadium: Tofiq Bahramov Stadium, Baku; Attendance: 25,500; Referee: Vladislav Bezborodov (Russia)

==== Group stage ====
Pos	Team	Pld	W	D	L	GF	GA	GD	Pts	Qualification	FIO	PAOK	QRB	LIB
1	(Italy) Fiorentina	6	4	1	1	15	6	+9	13	Advance to knockout phase	—	2–3	5–1	3–0
2	(Greece) PAOK	6	3	1	2	7	6	+1	10	Advance to knockout phase	0–0	—	0–1	2–0
3	(Azerbaijan) Qarabağ	6	2	1	3	7	12	−5	7		1–2	2–0	—	2–2
4	(Czech Republic) Slovan Liberec	6	1	1	4	7	12	−5	4		1–3	1–2	3–0	—

Source: UEFA

15 September 2016 1	Qarabağ (Azerbaijan)	2 – 2	(Czech Republic) Slovan Liberec	Baku, Azerbaijan
19:00 AZT (UTC+4)	Míchel 7' (yellow card) 75'; Agolli (yellow card) 72'; Sadygov 90+4'	Report	Sýkora 1'; Baroš 68'; Vůch (yellow card) 90+5'	Stadium: Dalga Arena, Baku; Attendance: 6,200; Referee: Stephan Klossner (Switzerland)

29 September 2016 2	Fiorentina (Italy)	5 – 1	(Azerbaijan) Qarabağ	Florence, Italy
21:00 AZT (UTC+4)	Sánchez (yellow card) 18'; Babacar 39', 45+2'; Kalinić 43'; Zárate 63', 78' (yellow card) 64'	Report	Yunuszade (red card) 30'; Medvedev (yellow card) 38'; Míchel (yellow card) 87'; Ndlovu 90+2'	Stadium: Stadio Artemio Franchi; Attendance: 14,145; Referee: Oliver Drachta (Austria)

20 October 2016 3	Qarabağ (Azerbaijan)	2 – 0	(Greece) PAOK	Baku, Azerbaijan
21:00 AZT (UTC+4)	Quintana 56'; Ndlovu (yellow card) 73'; Amirguliyev (yellow card) 80' (goal) 87'	Report		Stadium: Tofiq Bahramov Stadium, Baku; Attendance: 26,784; Referee: Alon Yefet (Israel)

4 November 2016 4	PAOK (Greece)	0 – 1	(Azerbaijan) Qarabağ	Thessaloniki, Greece
00:05 AZT (UTC+4)	Athanasiadis (yellow card) 4'; Tzavellas (yellow card) 56'; Pereyra (yellow card) 82'	Report	Medvedev (yellow card) 4'; Míchel 69'	Stadium: Toumba Stadium; Attendance: 11,476; Referee: John Beaton (Scotland)

24 November 2016 5	Slovan Liberec (Czech Republic)	3 – 0	(Azerbaijan) Qarabağ	Liberec, Czech Republic
22:00 AZT (UTC+4)	Vůch 11'; Komlichenko (yellow card) 45+1' (goal) 57' (pen.), 63'; Breite (yellow card) 75'	Report	Míchel (yellow card) 40'; Medvedev (yellow card) 56'	Stadium: Stadion u Nisy; Attendance: 4,942; Referee: Stefan Johannesson (Sweden)

8 December 2016 6	Qarabağ (Azerbaijan)	1 – 2	(Italy) Fiorentina	Baku, Azerbaijan
20:00 AZT (UTC+4)	Gurbanov (yellow card) 15'; Reynaldo 73'; Guseynov (yellow card) 86'	Report	Chiesa (yellow card) 19' (yellow-red card) 84' (goal) 76'; Vecino 60'	Stadium: Tofiq Bahramov Stadium, Baku; Attendance: 21,750; Referee: Ivan Bebek (Croatia)

== Squad statistics ==
As of Match played 5 May 2017

=== Appearances and goals ===
No.	Pos	Nat	Player	Total		Premier League		Azerbaijan Cup		Champions League		Europa League	
No.	Pos	Nat	Player	Apps	Goals	Apps	Goals	Apps	Goals	Apps	Goals	Apps	Goals
1	GK	(Serbia) SRB	Bojan Šaranov	2	0	2	0	0	0	0	0	0	0
2	DF	(Azerbaijan) AZE	Gara Garayev	37	0	15+6	0	5	0	4	0	7	0
5	DF	(Azerbaijan) AZE	Maksim Medvedev	35	3	18+1	3	5	0	4	0	7	0
6	FW	(South Africa) RSA	Dino Ndlovu	34	15	20+3	10	3+1	4	0	0	5+2	1
8	MF	(Spain) ESP	Míchel	40	7	21+4	4	4+1	1	4	0	5+1	2
10	MF	(North Macedonia) MKD	Muarem Muarem	40	7	15+8	4	5	1	3+1	1	6+2	1
11	FW	(Azerbaijan) AZE	Mahir Madatov	32	6	8+13	3	4+1	3	2+1	0	0+3	0
12	GK	(Azerbaijan) AZE	Shahrudin Mahammadaliyev	11	0	7	0	4	0	0	0	0	0
13	GK	(Bosnia and Herzegovina) BIH	Ibrahim Šehić	33	0	19	0	2	0	4	0	8	0
14	DF	(Azerbaijan) AZE	Rashad Sadygov	26	2	14	0	1	0	4	0	7	2
15	MF	(Azerbaijan) AZE	Rahid Amirguliyev	31	5	12+8	3	4+1	1	0+1	0	4+1	1
18	MF	(Azerbaijan) AZE	Ilgar Gurbanov	21	1	15+1	1	3	0	0+1	0	1	0
20	MF	(Brazil) BRA	Richard	34	5	20	2	2	1	4	2	8	0
21	DF	(Azerbaijan) AZE	Arif Dashdemirov	16	0	11	0	4	0	0	0	1	0
22	MF	(Azerbaijan) AZE	Afran Ismayilov	36	1	10+11	1	3+3	0	0+4	0	1+4	0
23	DF	(Azerbaijan) AZE	Elgun Ulukhanov	1	0	0	0	0+1	0	0	0	0	0
25	DF	(Albania) ALB	Ansi Agolli	36	0	20+1	0	3	0	4	0	8	0
28	DF	(Azerbaijan) AZE	İbrahim Aslanli	1	0	0	0	0+1	0	0	0	0	0
32	DF	(Azerbaijan) AZE	Elvin Yunuszade	21	1	12+1	1	4	0	0+1	0	3	0
44	FW	(Azerbaijan) AZE	Aghabala Ramazanov	15	0	8+4	0	2+1	0	0	0	0	0
55	DF	(Azerbaijan) AZE	Badavi Guseynov	32	1	20	1	3	0	4	0	4+1	0
71	FW	(Azerbaijan) AZE	Vüqar Nadirov	4	1	1+1	0	0+1	1	0	0	0+1	0
77	MF	(Azerbaijan) AZE	Elshan Abdullayev	3	1	1+1	1	0+1	0	0	0	0	0
91	MF	(Azerbaijan) AZE	Joshgun Diniyev	28	3	16+5	1	4+2	2	0+1	0	0	0
99	MF	(Spain) ESP	Dani Quintana	29	6	13+2	3	2	1	4	0	8	2
Players away from Qarabağ on loan:
Players who appeared for Qarabağ but left during the season:
9	FW	(Brazil) BRA	Reynaldo	21	6	7+3	4	0	0	3+1	1	4+3	1
17	MF	(Azerbaijan) AZE	Namig Alasgarov	14	4	2+6	0	2+1	4	0	0	0+3	0
67	MF	(Morocco) MAR	Alharbi El Jadeyaoui	2	1	1	1	0	0	0+1	0	0	0

=== Goal scorers ===
Place	Position	Nation	Number	Name	Premier League	Azerbaijan Cup	Champions League	Europa League	Total
1	FW	(South Africa)	6	Dino Ndlovu	10	4	0	1	15
2	MF	(Spain)	8	Míchel	4	1	0	2	7
2	MF	(North Macedonia)	10	Muarem Muarem	4	1	1	1	7
4	FW	(Brazil)	9	Reynaldo	4	0	1	1	6
4	FW	(Azerbaijan)	11	Mahir Madatov	3	3	0	0	6
4	MF	(Spain)	99	Dani Quintana	3	1	0	2	6
7	MF	(Azerbaijan)	15	Rahid Amirguliyev	3	1	0	1	5
7	MF	(Brazil)	20	Richard	2	1	2	0	5
9	MF	(Azerbaijan)	17	Namig Alasgarov	0	4	0	0	4
9				Own goal	3	1	0	0	4
11	FW	(Azerbaijan)	5	Maksim Medvedev	3	0	0	0	3
11	MF	(Azerbaijan)	91	Joshgun Diniyev	1	2	0	0	3
13	DF	(Azerbaijan)	14	Rashad Sadygov	0	0	0	2	2
14	MF	(Morocco)	67	Alharbi El Jadeyaoui	1	0	0	0	1
14	MF	(Azerbaijan)	18	Ilgar Gurbanov	1	0	0	0	1
14	DF	(Azerbaijan)	32	Elvin Yunuszade	1	0	0	0	1
14	MF	(Azerbaijan)	22	Afran Ismayilov	1	0	0	0	1
14	DF	(Azerbaijan)	55	Badavi Guseynov	1	0	0	0	1
14	MF	(Azerbaijan)	77	Elshan Abdullayev	1	0	0	0	1
14	FW	(Azerbaijan)	71	Vüqar Nadirov	0	1	0	0	1
				TOTALS	45	20	4	10	79

=== Disciplinary record ===
Number	Nation	Position	Name	Premier League		Azerbaijan Cup		Champions League		Europa League		Total	
Number	Nation	Position	Name	Yellow card	Red card	Yellow card	Red card	Yellow card	Red card	Yellow card	Red card	Yellow card	Red card
2	(Azerbaijan)	DF	Gara Garayev	3	0	0	0	2	0	0	0	5	0
5	(Azerbaijan)	DF	Maksim Medvedev	6	0	0	0	2	0	4	0	12	0
6	(South Africa)	FW	Dino Ndlovu	2	0	0	0	0	0	1	0	3	0
8	(Spain)	MF	Míchel	3	0	0	0	2	0	3	0	8	0
9	(Brazil)	FW	Reynaldo	1	0	0	0	0	0	0	0	1	0
10	(North Macedonia)	MF	Muarem Muarem	1	0	0	0	0	0	0	0	1	0
11	(Azerbaijan)	FW	Mahir Madatov	0	0	1	0	1	0	0	0	2	0
12	(Azerbaijan)	GK	Shahrudin Mahammadaliyev	0	0	1	0	0	0	0	0	1	0
13	(Bosnia and Herzegovina)	GK	Ibrahim Šehić	1	0	0	0	0	0	0	0	1	0
14	(Azerbaijan)	MF	Rashad Sadygov	1	0	0	0	1	0	2	0	4	0
15	(Azerbaijan)	MF	Rahid Amirguliyev	0	0	0	0	0	0	1	0	1	0
18	(Azerbaijan)	MF	Ilgar Gurbanov	1	0	0	0	0	0	1	0	2	0
20	(Brazil)	MF	Richard	3	1	0	0	0	0	1	0	4	1
25	(Albania)	DF	Ansi Agolli	2	0	0	0	0	0	1	0	3	0
32	(Azerbaijan)	DF	Elvin Yunuszade	2	0	0	0	0	0	0	1	2	1
44	(Azerbaijan)	FW	Aghabala Ramazanov	4	0	0	0	0	0	0	0	4	0
55	(Azerbaijan)	DF	Badavi Guseynov	2	0	0	0	1	0	1	0	4	0
77	(Azerbaijan)	MF	Elshan Abdullayev	0	0	1	0	0	0	0	0	1	0
91	(Azerbaijan)	MF	Joshgun Diniyev	4	0	0	0	1	0	0	0	5	0
99	(Spain)	MF	Dani Quintana	4	0	0	0	1	0	0	0	5	0
			TOTALS	39	1	3	0	11	0	16	1	69	2

== Notes ==
1. Qarabağ played their home matches at Tofiq Bahramov Republican Stadium, Baku, instead of their regular stadium Azersun Arena, Baku.
2. Qarabağ played their home match on matchday 1 at Dalga Arena, Baku, and played their home matches on matchday 3 and matchday 6 at Tofiq Bahramov Republican Stadium, Baku, instead of their regular stadium, Azersun Arena, Baku.
