= Míchel (footballer, born 1985) =

Spanish footballer

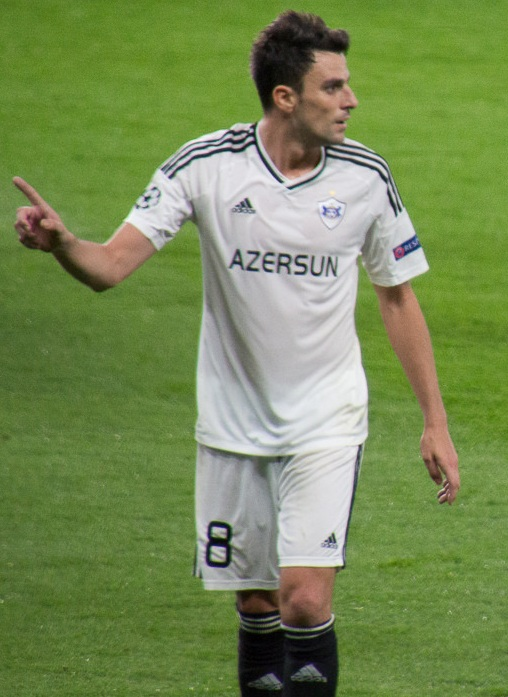

Personal information
- Full name: Miguel Marcos Madera
- Date of birth: 8 November 1985 (age 41)
- Place of birth: Lena, Spain
- Height: 1.83 m (6 ft 0 in)
- Position: Midfielder

Youth career
- –2003: Oviedo
- 2003–2004: Sporting Gijón

Senior career*
Years	Team	Apps	(Gls)
2004–2005	Sporting B		
2005–2010	Sporting Gijón	138	(7)
2010–2011	Birmingham City	9	(0)
2011	→ AEK Athens (loan)	15	(1)
2011–2014	Getafe	54	(1)
2014–2015	Maccabi Haifa	25	(1)
2015–2020	Qarabağ	104	(16)
2020–2021	Marino Luanco	8	(2)
Total		353	(26)
- * Club domestic league appearances and goals

Miguel Marcos Madera (born 8 November 1985), commonly known as Míchel, is a Spanish former professional footballer who played as a central midfielder.

Having been brought through the youth academy of Real Oviedo, he played with the first team of rivals Sporting de Gijón in both the Segunda División and La Liga, before eventually leaving for Premier League club Birmingham City in January 2010.

He spent the second half of 2010–11 on loan at AEK Athens, before returning to Spain for a three-year spell with Getafe. After a year with Maccabi Haifa, he signed for Qarabağ in 2015, with whom he won five consecutive Azerbaijan Premier League titles and two Azerbaijan Cups, as well as playing in UEFA competitions. In 2020, he returned to Spanish football with Segunda División B club Marino Luanco, but retired in mid-season.

== Playing career ==
=== Sporting Gijón ===
Born in Lena, Asturias, Míchel emerged through Real Oviedo's youth academy and transferred to Sporting de Gijón for the 2003–04 season. He helped Sporting's under-19 team win the Youth Champions Cup that year, and was named MVP of the final game.

Míchel started his senior career in 2004, with the club's reserves. Subsequently, he progressed to the first team, competing in the Segunda División; he played 24 matches in the 2005–06 campaign and scored one goal, in a 4–0 away win against Gimnàstic de Tarragona.

In 2007–08, Míchel helped the Asturian club return to La Liga after a ten-year absence. He was handed the vice-captaincy for the start of the following season, and made his debut in the top flight on 31 August 2008, playing 90 minutes in a 2–1 home defeat to Getafe. He went on to appear in 30 matches, 24 as a starter, as Sporting avoided relegation on the last matchday.

=== Birmingham City ===
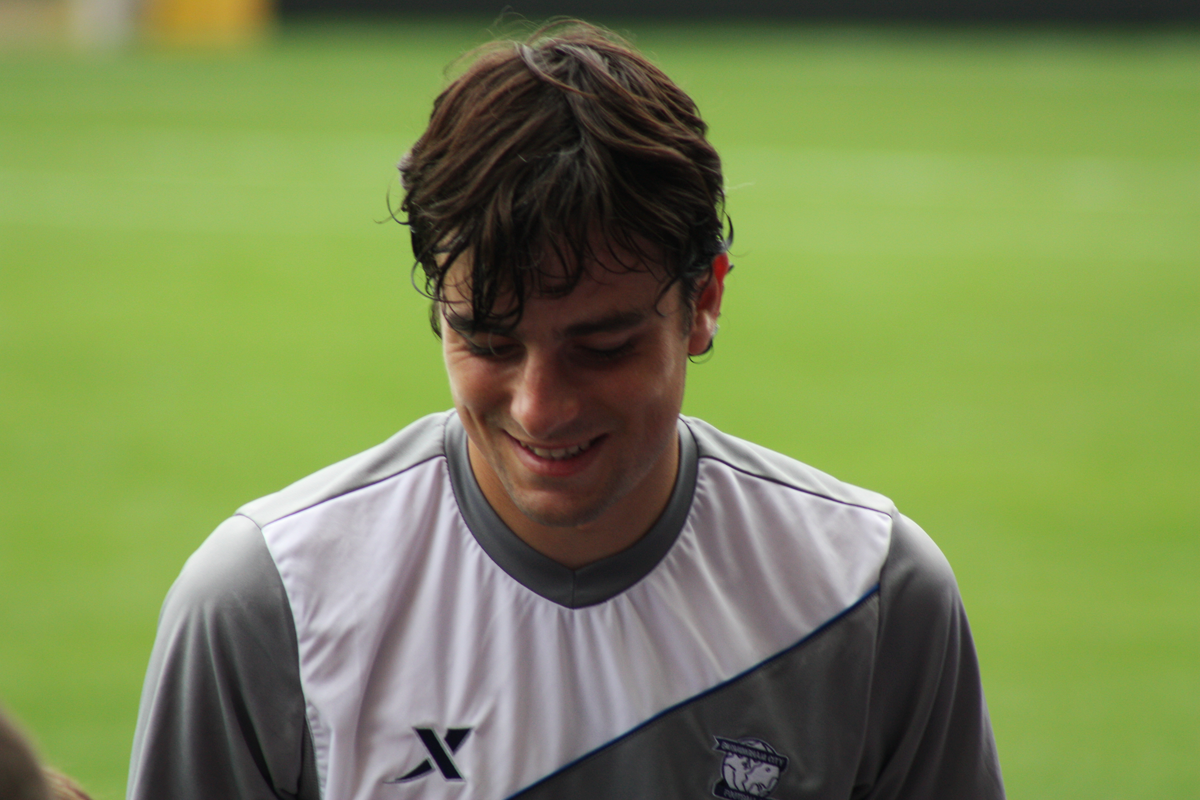
Míchel with Birmingham in 2011

Speculation had linked Míchel with Birmingham City, newly promoted to the English Premier League, in the summer of 2009, but the transfer was not completed until 11 January 2010, for a fee of £3 million. The player signed a two-and-a-half-year deal, with an option to extend the contract for a further 12 months. Spanish journalist and Sky Sports pundit Guillem Balagué described him as a good passer of the ball, tactically aware and positionally disciplined, and "not scared of the physical side", comparing him in style to Javier Mascherano, but "with a better range of passing".

Míchel made his first appearance in the Premier League on 27 January, replacing James McFadden in the 73rd minute as Birmingham's 15-game unbeaten run came to an end as they lost 3–0 to Chelsea at Stamford Bridge, and made his home debut three days later, again as a substitute. However, the fitness and what manager Alex McLeish described as "stunning" form of Barry Ferguson in central midfield meant that Míchel was restricted to just nine league appearances, and he was made available for loan in the January 2011 transfer window.

In January 2011, Míchel joined Super League Greece club AEK Athens on loan for the remainder of the season. He made his debut in a 2–0 away win against Skoda Xanthi, and on his second appearance, scored a 40-metre (44 yd) free kick against Panathinaikos in the seventh minute of stoppage time to take his team through to the semi-finals of the 2010–11 Greek Cup, 4–3 on aggregate. AEK went on to win the competition, but Míchel was an unused substitute in the final.

=== Getafe ===
In August 2011, Míchel played his first 45 minutes for Birmingham in over six months, in a 1–0 pre-season friendly defeat of Cork City. He then returned to La Liga with the Madrid-based Getafe for an undisclosed fee. On 6 November he scored his first goal for the club as, despite having only ten players, they came from behind to beat Atlético Madrid 3–2. He himself was sent off once in each of his three seasons: the first two were straight red cards in away defeats to local rivals Rayo Vallecano, and the third was for a second booking in a 4–1 defeat to another team from the capital, Real Madrid. Míchel appeared in 60 competitive games, scoring once, during his three years with Getafe, and was released on 22 August 2014.

=== Maccabi Haifa ===
Míchel signed a one-year contract with Israeli Premier League club Maccabi Haifa in September 2014. He made 25 appearances across the campaign, scoring his only goal on 14 December in a 4–0 Haifa derby win at rivals Hapoel.

=== Qarabağ ===
Míchel signed a two-year contract with Qarabağ of the Azerbaijan Premier League just ahead of the summer 2015 transfer deadline, and in time to be included in their Europa League squad. He appeared regularly in his first year as Qarabağ won a third consecutive championship, and scored four times in five Azerbaijan Cup ties – including a goal in the last minute of extra time to decide the final against Neftchi Baku – as his team completed a double. He played in 40 matches in all competitions to help Qarabağ achieve another double in the 2016–17 season, at the end of which his contract was extended for a further two years.

Míchel played every minute of Qarabağ's six 2017–18 Champions League qualifiers as they became the first team from Azerbaijan to reach the group stage of the competition.

On 7 June 2019, Míchel signed another two-year contract with Qarabağ.

On 17 July 2020, Míchel left Qarabağ by mutual consent.

=== Marino de Luanco ===
On 5 October 2020, Míchel came back to Asturias, after agreeing terms with third-tier club Marino de Luanco. He played eight matches in the Segunda División B before, in March 2021, he announced his retirement because of physical issues.

== Career statistics ==
Appearances and goals by club, season and competition
Club	Season	League			National Cup		League Cup		Continental		Total	
Club	Season	Division	Apps	Goals	Apps	Goals	Apps	Goals	Apps	Goals	Apps	Goals
Sporting de Gijón	2005–06	Segunda División	24	0	0	0	—		—		24	0
Sporting de Gijón	2006–07	Segunda División	35	0	0	0	—		—		35	0
Sporting de Gijón	2007–08	Segunda División	36	0	1	0	—		—		37	0
Sporting de Gijón	2008–09	La Liga	30	0	6	0	—		—		36	0
Sporting de Gijón	2009–10	La Liga	13	0	0	0	—		—		13	0
Sporting de Gijón	Total		138	0	7	0	—		—		145	0
Birmingham City	2009–10	Premier League	9	0	0	0	3	0	—		12	0
Birmingham City	2010–11	Premier League	0	0	0	0	0	0	—		0	0
Birmingham City	Total		9	0	0	0	3	0	—		12	0
AEK Athens (loan)	2010–11	Super League Greece	15	0	3	1	—		—		18	1
Getafe	2011–12	La Liga	22	1	2	0	—		—		24	1
Getafe	2012–13	La Liga	17	0	2	0	—		—		19	0
Getafe	2013–14	La Liga	15	0	2	0	—		—		17	0
Getafe	Total		54	1	6	0	—		—		60	1
Maccabi Haifa	2014–15	Israeli Premier League	25	1	1	0	2	0	—		28	1
Qarabağ	2015–16	Azerbaijan Premier League	24	4	5	4	—		2 (Note: Appearances in UEFA Europa League)	0	31	8
Qarabağ	2016–17	Azerbaijan Premier League	25	4	5	1	—		10 (Note: Four appearances in UEFA Champions League, six appearances and two goals in UEFA Europa League)	2	40	7
Qarabağ	2017–18	Azerbaijan Premier League	23	3	2	0	—		12 (Note: Appearances in UEFA Champions League)	3	37	6
Qarabağ	2018–19	Azerbaijan Premier League	20	5	3	2	—		13 (Note: Six appearances and one goal in UEFA Champions League, seven appearances in UEFA Europa League)	1	36	8
Qarabağ	2019–20	Azerbaijan Premier League	12	0	0	0	—		13 (Note: Five appearances in UEFA Champions League, eight appearances and one goal in UEFA Europa League)	1	25	1
Qarabağ	Total		104	16	15	7	—		50	7	159	30
Marino de Luanco	2020–21	Segunda División B	8	2	—		—		—		8	2
Career total			353	20	32	8	5	0	50	7	440	35

== Honours ==
AEK Athens

- Greek Football Cup: 2010–11

Qarabağ

- Azerbaijan Premier League: 2015–16, 2016–17, 2017–18, 2018–19, 2019–20
- Azerbaijan Cup: 2015–16, 2016–17
