= Juan Manuel Cobo =

Argentine footballer

Personal information
- Full name: Juan Manuel Cobo Gálvez
- Date of birth: 26 November 1984 (age 41)
- Place of birth: Córdoba, Argentina
- Height: 1.80 m (5 ft 11 in)
- Position: Midfielder

Team information
- Current team: Jesina

Senior career*
Years	Team	Apps	(Gls)
2003–2007	Instituto	51	(2)
2007–2009	Elche	43	(4)
2009–2010	Thrasyvoulos	26	(1)
2010–2011	Olimpo	34	(2)
2011–2014	Arsenal de Sarandí	10	(0)
2012–2013	→ Quilmes (loan)	33	(2)
2014	O'Higgins	10	(0)
2014–2016	Olimpo	45	(2)
2016	Argentinos Juniors	9	(1)
2016–2017	Banfield	13	(1)
2017–2018	Independiente Rivadavia	11	(0)
2018–2019	Fasano	19	(1)
2019–	Jesina	0	(0)
- * Club domestic league appearances and goals as of 01:31, 9 November 2019 (UTC)

Juan Manuel Cobo Gálvez (born 26 November 1984) is an Argentine professional footballer who plays as a midfielder for Italian club S.S.D. Jesina Calcio.

== Titles ==
- Arsenal de Sarandí 2012 (Torneo Clausura Primera División Argentina Championship), 2013 (Copa Argentina)
