= Manuel Castiñeiras =

Spanish footballer

Personal information
- Full name: Manuel Castiñeiras Porto
- Date of birth: 7 August 1979 (age 47)
- Place of birth: Compostela, Spain
- Height: 1.85 m (6 ft 1 in)
- Position: Centre-back

Senior career*
Years	Team	Apps	(Gls)
1998–2001	Compostela B		
2001–2004	Compostela	79	(0)
2004–2006	Eibar	76	(0)
2006–2007	Tenerife	11	(0)
2007–2010	Racing Ferrol	53	(0)
2010–2011	Cerceda	19	(1)
2011–2015	Compostela	65	(2)
Total		303	(3)
- * Club domestic league appearances and goals

Manuel Castiñeiras Porto (born 7 August 1979) is a Spanish retired footballer who played as a central defender.

== Club career ==
Born in Santiago de Compostela, A Coruña, Castiñeiras' career was mainly associated with local SD Compostela. He represented them in four levels of Spanish football, the highest being Segunda División.

Other than the Galicians, in that tier Castiñeiras also played for SD Eibar, CD Tenerife and Racing de Ferrol, for a total of 138 matches over five seasons. On 30 January 2015, the 35-year-old Compostela captain accepted to retire so that newly-signed Yacine Qasmi could be registered by the Royal Spanish Football Federation; he joined the club's organigram immediately afterwards.
