= Gonzalo Vicente =

Uruguayan footballer (born 1979)

Personal information
- Full name: Gonzalo German Vicente Maillot
- Date of birth: December 22, 1979 (age 46)
- Place of birth: Uruguay
- Height: 1.76 m (5 ft 9 in)
- Position: Defender

Team information
- Current team: Racing de Montevideo

Senior career*
Years	Team	Apps	(Gls)
2001	Peñarol	-	(-)
2002–2003	El Tanque Sisley	-	(-)
2003–2005	Liverpool (URU)	-	(-)
2005–2006	S.S.C. Venezia	27	(1)
2006–2007	Real Valladolid	18	(0)
2007–2008	Cádiz CF	0	(0)
2008–2009	Liverpool (URU)		
2009–2010	Racing FC (URU)		
2010–2011	Wanderers FC (URU)		
- * Club domestic league appearances and goals as of July 10, 2006 ‡ National team caps and goals as of July 10, 2006

Gonzalo Germán Vicente Maillot aka Gonzalo Vicente (born 22 December 1979 in Uruguay) is a Uruguayan football player.

Vicente played for Real Valladolid and Cádiz in the Spanish Segunda División.
