= Raúl Cámara =

Spanish footballer

Personal information
- Full name: Raúl Miguel Cámara
- Date of birth: 28 February 1984 (age 42)
- Place of birth: Madrid, Spain
- Height: 1.72 m (5 ft 8 in)
- Position: Full-back

Youth career
- Orcasitas
- Atlético Madrid

Senior career*
Years	Team	Apps	(Gls)
2003–2005	Sporting Gijón B	72	(1)
2005–2009	Sporting Gijón	77	(0)
2009–2011	Recreativo	67	(0)
2011–2013	Xerez	65	(1)
2013–2019	Tenerife	165	(1)
2019–2020	Córdoba	12	(0)
Total		458	(3)
- * Club domestic league appearances and goals

Raúl Miguel Cámara (born 28 February 1984 in Madrid) is a Spanish former professional footballer who played mainly as a right-back.
