= Omar Sampedro =

Spanish footballer

Personal information
- Full name: Omar Sampedro Bernardo
- Date of birth: 5 June 1985 (age 41)
- Place of birth: Avilés, Spain
- Height: 1.69 m (5 ft 6 1/2 in)
- Position: Forward

Youth career
- 1995–2003: Oviedo
- 2003–2004: Sporting Gijón

Senior career*
Years	Team	Apps	(Gls)
2004–2005	Sporting B	25	(15)
2004–2009	Sporting Gijón	76	(7)
2005–2006	→ Zamora (loan)	21	(6)
2009	Castellón	16	(1)
2010	Ponferradina	15	(0)
2010–2011	Pontevedra	10	(0)
2011	Teruel	18	(2)
2011–2012	Huracán	33	(6)
2012–2013	Alcoyano	9	(0)
2013	Huracán	19	(1)
2013–2015	Avilés	67	(7)
2015–2016	Marino Luanco	32	(15)
2016–2019	Langreo	72	(24)
2019–2023	Llanera	98	(25)
2023–2024	Praviano	19	(2)
- * Club domestic league appearances and goals

Omar Sampedro Bernardo (born 5 June 1985) is a Spanish former footballer who played as a forward.

== Club career ==
Sampedro was born in Avilés, Asturias. After finishing his graduation in neighbouring Sporting de Gijón's youth setup he made his senior debuts with the B-team in the 2004–05 season, in the Tercera División. On 24 October 2004 he played his first game as a professional, featuring the entire second half in a 3–1 home win over Córdoba CF in the Segunda División, and his first goal came on 28 November as he scored the first in a 2–1 success at Pontevedra CF.

After a loan spell with lowly Zamora CF Sampedro returned to Sporting, being promoted to La Liga in 2008 and making his debut in the competition on 26 October 2008 by coming on as a late substitute in a 3–0 away win over Deportivo de La Coruña. He finished the campaign with CD Castellón in the second level, having signed in February 2009.

After being released by the Valencians Sampedro resumed his career in the Segunda División B, representing SD Ponferradina, Pontevedra, CD Teruel, Huracán Valencia CF (two stints), CD Alcoyano and Real Avilés. Since 2015 Omar plays for UP Langreo.
