= Diego Camacho (footballer) =

Spanish footballer

Personal information
- Full name: Diego Camacho Quesada
- Date of birth: 3 October 1976 (age 50)
- Place of birth: Madrid, Spain
- Height: 1.86 m (6 ft 1 in)
- Position: Defensive midfielder

Senior career*
Years	Team	Apps	(Gls)
1995–1996	Móstoles	17	(0)
1996	Mérida	0	(0)
1996–1997	Burgos	25	(1)
1997–1998	Gimnàstic	25	(1)
1998–2000	Lugo	53	(3)
1998	→ Murcia (loan)	13	(0)
2000–2001	Gimnástica	36	(2)
2001–2002	Granada	31	(4)
2002–2004	Recreativo	62	(3)
2004–2008	Levante	100	(6)
2007–2008	→ Valladolid (loan)	9	(0)
2008–2010	Sporting Gijón	54	(1)
2010–2011	Albacete	15	(0)
Total		440	(21)
- * Club domestic league appearances and goals

Diego Camacho Quesada (born 3 October 1976) is a Spanish former professional footballer who played as a defensive midfielder.

A late bloomer – he was still playing lower league football at the age of 25 – he represented 13 clubs in his career. Over six seasons, he amassed La Liga totals of 154 matches and four goals, mainly with Levante and Sporting de Gijón (two years apiece).

== Career ==
Born in Madrid, Camacho spent the early part of his career with modest clubs in the Segunda División B. For the 2002–03 season, however, he signed with La Liga side Recreativo de Huelva from Granada CF; he made his debut in the competition on 14 September 2002 in a 3–0 away loss against Valencia CF, as Recre were finally relegated even though they reached the final of the Copa del Rey.

Camacho joined newly promoted Levante UD in the summer of 2004 and, after experiencing one top-flight promotion and relegation with them, he was loaned to another recently promoted team, Real Valladolid, for 2007–08. He featured scarcely during the campaign, and subsequently moved to Sporting de Gijón (also promoted to the top tier) on an initial one-year contract.

On 23 May 2009, in one of his 31 league appearances, the defensive-minded Camacho scored a rare but crucial goal in a 2–1 win at his former employers Valladolid as the Asturias club eventually avoided relegation. He featured slightly less in the the following season with Sporting finishing in 15th position, again good enough to prevent a drop, and was released aged 33.
