= Tati Maldonado =

Spanish footballer

Personal information
- Full name: Francisco José Maldonado Collante
- Date of birth: 2 June 1981 (age 45)
- Place of birth: San Fernando, Spain
- Height: 1.79 m (5 ft 10 in)
- Position: Forward

Youth career
- Betis

Senior career*
Years	Team	Apps	(Gls)
1999–2004	Betis B	111	(40)
2003–2008	Betis	19	(0)
2004–2005	→ Ceuta (loan)	34	(7)
2005–2006	→ Lorca Deportiva (loan)	26	(13)
2007–2008	→ Gimnàstic (loan)	31	(4)
2008–2010	Sporting Gijón	35	(2)
2010–2012	Cartagena	14	(0)
2012–2013	Xerez	46	(7)
2013	Chania	0	(0)
2014–2016	San Fernando	68	(24)
- * Club domestic league appearances and goals as of 7 January 2018

Francisco José 'Tati' Maldonado Collante (born 2 June 1981) is a Spanish former footballer who played as a forward.

== Club career ==
Maldonado, a product of Real Betis's youth system, was born in San Fernando, Cádiz, and played for the Andalusia club four seasons, making his La Liga debut on 8 February 2003 by featuring 15 minutes in a 1–4 away loss against Real Madrid. He would only appear in four games in two seasons combined before moving to AD Ceuta and then Lorca Deportiva CF, completing successful loan spells.

During the summer of 2006, Betis re-signed Maldonado from Lorca for €62,000. He impressed during the summer friendlies, and was given a starting place against Valencia CF in a 1–2 away loss for the season opener, as a right winger in the absence of Joaquín.

Following a promising start – with another four matches in the starting XI – that included an assist against Athletic Bilbao in a 3–0 home win, Maldonado found himself out of favour with newly appointed coach Luis Fernández, and finished the campaign with 15 appearances, going scoreless in the process.

In 2007–08, Maldonado was again loaned, to second division club Gimnàstic de Tarragona. At the end of the season he joined promoted Sporting de Gijón, on a three-year deal; on 21 December 2008 he netted his first goal for the Asturians, in a 1–0 home win over UD Almería, with his team narrowly avoiding top flight relegation.

After a poor second season individually, Maldonado left for FC Cartagena in the second level. He continued competing in the category in the following years with Xerez CD, being relegated in 2013.
