= Neru (footballer) =

Spanish footballer

Personal information
- Full name: Francisco Borja Enrique Ayesa
- Date of birth: 20 January 1974 (age 52)
- Place of birth: Laredo, Spain
- Height: 1.82 m (6 ft 0 in)
- Position: Defender

Youth career
- 1991–1993: Laredo

Senior career*
Years	Team	Apps	(Gls)
1993–1994	Laredo		
1994–1998	Racing B		
1998–2007	Racing Santander	108	(0)
2004–2005	→ Sporting Gijón (loan)	37	(1)
2007	Cádiz	7	(0)
2007–2009	Sporting Gijón	23	(0)
2009–2010	Alavés	5	(0)
2010	Huesca	9	(1)
2010–2011	Pontevedra	7	(0)

Managerial career
- 2012–2013: Santoña
- 2013–2014: Noja (assistant)
- 2014–2015: Gama
- 2016–2018: Bezana
- * Club domestic league appearances and goals

Francisco Borja Enrique Ayesa (born 20 January 1974), known as Neru, is a Spanish former footballer and coach. Mainly a central defender, he also played left flank on occasion.

During a 17-year professional career he appeared in seven La Liga seasons for a total of 127 games, with Racing de Santander (six years) and Sporting de Gijón (one).

== Football career ==
Neru was born in Laredo, Cantabria. A product of hometown club Racing de Santander's youth system, he first appeared with the main squad during the 1998–99 season, already aged 24. During the following years (which included a second division stint), he would be played in various defensive positions.

In 2004–05, Neru was loaned to Segunda División side Sporting de Gijón, being an undisputed first-choice throughout the campaign and scoring a rare goal on 1 May 2005, in a 3–2 home win against Pontevedra CF. He returned to Santander for a further 15 La Liga games, in 2005–06.

After becoming a free agent in January 2007 and an uneventful six-month stint with another second level team, Cádiz CF, Neru rejoined Gijón in the ensuing summer, playing only four matches during the season as the Asturians returned to the top flight after a 10-year hiatus. In August 2009 the 35-year-old joined Deportivo Alavés, now in division three. However, after a run-in with the board of directors, he became surplus to requirements. As a result he was free, in late January 2010, to move up a tier signing with SD Huesca until the end of the season. There he replaced Daniel Mustafá, who had been released. The following season, 2010–2011 he moved to Pontevedra CF, from which he retired.

In the 2012–2013 season Neru coached for Santoña CF. The following year he was signed on as assistant coach under Claudio Arzeno by the SD Noja. He went on to coach for SD Gama and CD Bezana.

== Personal life ==
In 2011, Neru ran for office in the municipality of Laredo on the People's Party ticket. He lost.
