= Jorge García (footballer, born 1984) =

Spanish footballer

Jorge
Personal information
- Full name: Jorge García Torre
- Date of birth: 13 January 1984 (age 42)
- Place of birth: Gijón, Spain
- Height: 1.85 m (6 ft 1 in)
- Position: Centre-back

Youth career
- Sporting Gijón

Senior career*
Years	Team	Apps	(Gls)
2003–2005	Sporting Gijón B		
2005–2011	Sporting Gijón	116	(5)
2009–2010	→ Gimnàstic (loan)	34	(3)
2011–2013	Murcia	64	(4)
2013–2014	Lugo	11	(0)
2014–2016	Llagostera	28	(0)
2016–2017	Burgos	28	(0)
2017–2019	Rayo Majadahonda	41	(0)
2019	Langreo	6	(0)
2019–2021	Llanera	53	(4)
2021–2022	Urraca	37	(2)
2022–2024	Llanera	65	(6)
Total		483	(24)
- * Club domestic league appearances and goals

Jorge García Torre (born 13 January 1984), known simply as Jorge, is a Spanish former professional footballer who played as a central defender.

His twin brother Alejandro was also a footballer (goalkeeper). Both began their career at Sporting de Gijón, and finished it with amateurs UD Llanera.
