= Pedro (footballer, born 1984) =

Spanish footballer

Personal information
- Full name: Pedro Santa Cecilia García
- Date of birth: 10 March 1984 (age 42)
- Place of birth: Gijón, Spain
- Height: 1.80 m (5 ft 11 in)
- Position: Midfielder

Youth career
- Colegio Inmaculada
- Sporting Gijón

Senior career*
Years	Team	Apps	(Gls)
2003–2006	Sporting Gijón B		
2006–2010	Sporting Gijón	84	(4)
2010	Albacete	6	(0)
2011–2012	Charleroi	7	(0)
2012–2013	Auckland City	11	(1)
Total		108	(5)
- * Club domestic league appearances and goals

Pedro Santa Cecilia García (born 10 March 1984), known simply as Pedro, is a Spanish former footballer who played as a right midfielder.

== Club career ==
Born in Gijón, Asturias, Pedro made his professional debut with hometown's Sporting de Gijón on 12 February 2006, in a 0–0 away draw against Recreativo de Huelva. He went on to become an important midfield element in the subsequent seasons, playing 37 matches in 2007–08 to help the club return to La Liga after a ten-year hiatus.

Pedro first appeared in the top flight on 31 August 2008, featuring 11 minutes in a 1–2 home loss to Getafe CF. He appeared in 17 games during the campaign, almost always as a substitute, and played almost no part in 2009–10 as the team again managed to retain their league status, being released in June 2010.

On 6 September 2010, Pedro signed a one-year contract with Albacete Balompié of the second division, being released only three and a half months after. In August of the following year, he moved abroad and penned a one-year deal (with the option for a further season) with Belgian Second Division side R. Charleroi SC.

On 11 October 2012, after terminating his contract with the club and having appeared in only one Pro League match, Pedro signed for Auckland City FC in New Zealand, joining several compatriots including manager Ramon Tribulietx.
