= Mate Bilić =

Croatian footballer (born 1980)

Personal information
- Full name: Mate Bilić
- Date of birth: 23 October 1980 (age 46)
- Place of birth: Split, SR Croatia, SFR Yugoslavia
- Height: 1.84 m (6 ft 0 in)
- Position: Striker

Youth career
- Hajduk Split

Senior career*
Years	Team	Apps	(Gls)
1998–2001	Hajduk Split	66	(19)
1999	→ Mosor (loan)		
2001–2004	Zaragoza	18	(1)
2002–2003	→ Almería (loan)	31	(9)
2003–2004	→ Sporting Gijón (loan)	41	(15)
2004–2005	Córdoba	31	(3)
2005–2006	Lleida	40	(18)
2006–2008	Rapid Wien	54	(17)
2008–2013	Sporting Gijón	160	(42)
2013–2015	RNK Split	39	(13)
Total		480	(137)

International career
2000–2001	Croatia U21	8	(4)
2009–2010	Croatia	6	(3)
- * Club domestic league appearances and goals

Mate Bilić (born 23 October 1980) is a Croatian retired footballer who played as a striker.

During his professional career he played mainly in Spain – where he arrived at the age of 21 – representing five different clubs. He amassed La Liga totals of 124 games and 22 goals over the course of five seasons for Sporting de Gijón and Zaragoza, as well as 197 games and 66 goals in the Segunda División.

== Club career ==
Born in Split, Croatia, Socialist Federal Republic of Yugoslavia, Bilić began his professional career in 1997 at hometown club HNK Hajduk Split, and went on to establish himself as a regular during 1999–2000 after a season-long loan spell with NK Mosor in the Croatian second division. He scored 15 league goals for Hajduk over two separate campaigns, including nine in 2000–01 as the side won their fourth Prva HNL title.

At the end of August 2001, Bilić transferred to Real Zaragoza in La Liga, but scored only once in 18 league appearances. Between 2002 and 2006 he represented UD Almería, Sporting de Gijón, Córdoba CF and UE Lleida (all in the Segunda División).

In June 2006, Bilić signed with SK Rapid Wien of the Austrian Bundesliga. In January 2008 he returned to Spain and Gijón, helping the Asturian club return to the top flight after a ten-year absence by scoring ten times, despite playing in roughly half of the games.

Bilić scored a hat-trick at Sevilla FC on 13 September 2008, but Sporting were defeated 3–4. During the season he again formed an effective attacking partnership with David Barral, with the pair combining for 22 league goals as the team finished in 14th place; in the following years he was used much more sparingly, only scoring one competitive goal in 2010–11, in the Copa del Rey against RCD Mallorca (2–2 home draw, 3–5 aggregate loss).

== International career ==
Bilić won a total of 16 caps for the Croatian under-17, under-19 and under-21 national teams, scoring six goals. Before making his debut for the full side he had also been eligible to play for Bosnia and Herzegovina, as his parents hailed from Tomislavgrad, Bosnia and Herzegovina.

Head coach Slaven Bilić first selected his namesake for a friendly game against Romania on 11 February 2009, but he did not feature in that match. He eventually made his debut on 14 October, in the nation's final 2010 FIFA World Cup qualifier against Kazakhstan in Astana, coming on as a substitute for Mario Mandžukić in the 63rd minute; Croatia won the game 2–1, but failed to reach the play-offs after finishing third in their group.

On 14 November 2009, Bilić scored his first international goals, in a friendly with Liechtenstein in Vinkovci, helping to a final 5–0 victory – the first of his two came only 42 seconds after kick-off. On 19 May 2010, in another exhibition game, against Austria in Klagenfurt, he replaced Mladen Petrić at the hour-mark and netted the only goal of the match in the 86th minute.

=== International goals ===
Goal	Date	Venue	Opponent	Score	Result	Competition
1–2	14 November 2009	HNK Cibalia, Vinkovci, Croatia	Liechtenstein	1–0	5–0	Friendly
1–2	14 November 2009	HNK Cibalia, Vinkovci, Croatia	Liechtenstein	5–0	5–0	Friendly
3	19 May 2010	Hypo-Arena, Klagenfurt, Austria	Austria	1–0	1–0	Friendly
