= Luis Morán =

Spanish footballer

Personal information
- Full name: Luis Morán Sánchez
- Date of birth: 26 July 1987 (age 39)
- Place of birth: Luanco, Spain
- Height: 1.72 m (5 ft 8 in)
- Position: Winger

Youth career
- Marino
- 1998–2006: Sporting Gijón

Senior career*
Years	Team	Apps	(Gls)
2006–2007	Sporting Gijón B	36	(14)
2007–2012	Sporting Gijón	105	(12)
2012	→ AEK Larnaca (loan)	11	(0)
2013	Mirandés	12	(2)
2013–2015	Ermis	45	(6)
2015–2016	Olympiacos Volos	8	(0)
2016	Logroñés	18	(1)
2016–2017	Othellos Athienou	20	(8)
2017–2022	Marino	147	(24)
2023–2024	Colunga	7	(0)

International career
2003	Spain U16	3	(0)
- * Club domestic league appearances and goals as of 01:57, 28 September 2024 (UTC)

Luis Morán Sánchez (born 26 July 1987) is a Spanish professional footballer who plays mainly as a right winger.

== Club career ==
Born in Luanco, Asturias, and a product of local Sporting de Gijón's youth academy, Morán appeared once for its first team in 2006–07, with the club in the Segunda División. In his first two full professional seasons, he scored four goals in 28 matches apiece.

In 2008–09, with Sporting now in La Liga, Morán scored an historic goal in the last round against Recreativo de Huelva (2–1 home win), which guaranteed top-flight status for a further year. He repeated the same exact numbers the following campaign, being utilised mostly as a right winger by manager Manuel Preciado as opposed to his attacking midfielder role in the reserves.

Morán only made 15 league appearances in 2010–11 – six starts, 608 minutes, no goals – as the side once again remained in the top division. On 31 August 2012, after a short loan spell with AEK Larnaca FC in Cyprus, Sporting announced he was leaving the club.

On 31 January 2013, after spending several months without a team, Morán signed for second-tier CD Mirandés until the end of the season. Safe for a very brief spell in his country with UD Logroñés, he then plied his trade in the Cypriot first and second divisions as well as the Football League Greece.

Morán returned to his hometown in August 2017, with the 30-year-old joining Marino de Luanco on a one-year deal. On 5 July 2019, after having been an essential unit as the team promoted from Tercera División as runners-up under former Spanish international Oli, he renewed his contract.

== Personal life ==
Morán's mother, Soledad, was a teacher. His grandfather Manuel (died in 2006) was mayor of Gozón for the Spanish Socialist Workers' Party.

== Career statistics ==
As of 9 May 2021

Club	Season	League			National Cup		Continental		Other		Total	
Club	Season	Division	Apps	Goals	Apps	Goals	Apps	Goals	Apps	Goals	Apps	Goals
Sporting Gijón	2006–07	Segunda División	1	0	0	0	—		—		1	0
Sporting Gijón	2007–08	Segunda División	28	4	1	0	—		—		29	4
Sporting Gijón	2008–09	Segunda División	28	4	3	0	—		—		31	4
Sporting Gijón	2009–10	La Liga	28	4	1	0	—		—		29	4
Sporting Gijón	2010–11	La Liga	15	0	2	0	—		—		17	0
Sporting Gijón	2011–12	La Liga	5	0	2	0	—		—		7	0
Sporting Gijón	Total		105	12	9	0	—		0	0	114	12
AEK Larnaca (loan)	2011–12	Cypriot First Division	11	0	6	3	—		—		17	3
Mirandés	2012–13	Segunda División	12	2	0	0	—		—		12	2
Ermis	2013–14	Cypriot First Division	28	3	6	0	—		—		34	3
Ermis	2014–15	Cypriot First Division	17	3	1	0	1 (Note: Appearance in UEFA Europa League)	0	1 (Note: Appearance in Cypriot Super Cup)	0	20	3
Ermis	Total		45	6	7	0	1	0	1	0	54	6
Olympiacos Volos	2015–16	Football League Greece	8	0	1	0	—		0	0	9	0
Logroñés	2015–16	Segunda División B	15	1	0	0	—		3 (Note: Appearances in Segunda División B play-offs)	0	18	1
Othellos Athienou	2016–17	Cypriot Second Division	?	?	—		—		—		?	0
Marino	2017–18	Tercera División	33	15	0	0	—		—		33	15
Marino	2018–19	Tercera División	38	6	0	0	—		—		38	6
Marino	2019–20	Segunda División B	26	1	1	0	—		—		27	1
Marino	2020–21	Segunda División B	21	0	0	0	—		—		21	0
Marino	Total		118	22	1	0	0	0	0	0	119	22
Career total			314	43	24	3	1	0	4	0	343	46
