= Kike Mateo =

Spanish footballer

Personal information
- Full name: Enrique Mateo Montoya
- Date of birth: 30 December 1979 (age 46)
- Place of birth: Murcia, Spain
- Height: 1.80 m (5 ft 11 in)
- Position: Midfielder

Senior career*
Years	Team	Apps	(Gls)
1998	Pinatar	8	(6)
1998–1999	Bullense	24	(6)
1999–2000	Orihuela	41	(14)
2000	Ciudad Murcia	23	(11)
2000–2002	Mallorca B	29	(3)
2002–2003	Orihuela	20	(1)
2003–2004	Lorca Deportiva CF	41	(6)
2004–2005	Eibar	42	(8)
2005–2007	Hércules	61	(11)
2007–2010	Sporting Gijón	74	(14)
2010–2012	Elche	55	(3)
2012–2013	UCAM Murcia	15	(2)
2013–2015	Orihuela	?	(5)
2015	CF Lorca Deportiva		
Total		433	(90)

Managerial career
- 2017–2019: Ciudad Murcia
- * Club domestic league appearances and goals

Enrique 'Kike' Mateo Montoya (born 30 December 1979) is a Spanish retired footballer who played as an attacking midfielder and manager.

== Football career ==
Born in Murcia, Mateo spent until the age of 25 in the third and fourth divisions, when he signed with SD Eibar in the summer of 2004. During the second level campaign he did not miss one single game, as the Basque team nearly achieved an historical La Liga promotion, eventually finishing fourth; subsequently he played another two seasons in division two, with Hércules CF, also appearing and scoring regularly.

In 2007–08, Mateo proved instrumental for Sporting de Gijón, whom he joined in July 2007 as a free agent, netting a squad-best 12 goals as the Asturias club returned to the top flight after a ten-year absence. He made his competition debut on 31 August 2008 in a 1–2 home loss against Getafe CF, and scored his first goal two rounds later, in a 1–7 demolition defeat at Real Madrid– as Sporting avoided relegation in the last matchday, his other goal of the season came against FC Barcelona (1–3 loss at the Camp Nou on 8 February 2009)– and he appeared in a total of 24 matches, 14 from the bench.

On 16 July 2010, aged nearly 31, Mateo signed with Elche CF in the second tier, for three years. He left at the end of his second season, and resumed his career in the lower leagues.
