= Sergio Matabuena =

Spanish footballer (born 1979)

Personal information
- Full name: Sergio Matabuena Delgado
- Date of birth: 12 February 1979 (age 47)
- Place of birth: Santander, Spain
- Height: 1.85 m (6 ft 1 in)
- Position: Defensive midfielder

Youth career
- Racing Santander

Senior career*
Years	Team	Apps	(Gls)
1998–2002	Racing B		
2000–2001	→ Velarde (loan)		
2002–2007	Racing Santander	74	(5)
2007–2011	Sporting Gijón	82	(2)
2011–2012	Valladolid	14	(0)
- * Club domestic league appearances and goals

Sergio Matabuena Delgado (born 12 February 1979) is a Spanish former professional footballer who played as a defensive midfielder.

== Club career ==
Matabuena was born in Santander, Cantabria. A product of his hometown club Racing de Santander's youth system, he made his debut in La Liga on 17 November 2002 in a 1–2 home loss against RCD Mallorca, and scored his first goals in the following season.

Never an undisputed starter, Matabuena would be a mere training partner upon Gonzalo Colsa's return to Racing in 2006 and, after only five appearances during 2006–07, he moved to Sporting de Gijón in the Segunda División, being instrumental in helping them achieve a 2008 top-flight return. In a campaign in which he collected 14 yellow cards (also netting two late goals in a 2–2 draw at Córdoba CF), he earned the affectionate nickname "Matabuena Gattuso".

Matabuena appeared significantly less in the following top-tier seasons – 14 matches in 2009–10 – being only second or third-choice holding midfielder. On 13 January 2011, aged 32, he returned to the second division and signed for Real Valladolid.
