= Rafel Sastre =

Spanish footballer (born 1975)

Personal information
- Full name: Rafel Sastre Reus
- Date of birth: 22 October 1975 (age 51)
- Place of birth: Binissalem, Spain
- Height: 1.75 m (5 ft 9 in)
- Position: Right-back

Youth career
- Mallorca

Senior career*
Years	Team	Apps	(Gls)
1995–1999	Mallorca B	93	(6)
1999–2001	Cádiz	63	(3)
2001–2011	Sporting Gijón	309	(4)
2011–2012	Huesca	22	(0)
2012–2013	Atlético Baleares	23	(0)
Total		510	(13)
- * Club domestic league appearances and goals

Rafel Sastre Reus (born 22 October 1975) is a Spanish former professional footballer who played as a right-back.

He amassed Segunda División totals of 311 games and four goals over the course of nine seasons, seven of those with Sporting de Gijón. He appeared in La Liga with the same club, making 52 appearances in that competition.

== Club career ==
Sastre was born in Binissalem, Balearic Islands. For 14 professional seasons he represented RCD Mallorca B, Cádiz CF (two years in the Segunda División B) and Sporting de Gijón. With the Asturias club, he amassed totals of 257 games and four goals in the Segunda División, including 37 in 2007–08 as it returned to La Liga after a ten-year hiatus; during this timeframe, he was eventually named team captain.

Sastre made his first appearance in the top flight at almost 33, in 2008–09's opener, a 1–2 home loss against Getafe CF. In his two years at the El Molinón in that league he totalled 44 matches, with Sporting also retaining their status in the 2009–10 campaign.

In June 2011, aged 35, Sastre left Gijón after ten years with the same club and signed for SD Huesca of the second tier. He retired one year later, after one season in division three with CD Atlético Baleares.

== Personal life ==
Sastre's younger brother, Lluís (ten years his junior), was also a footballer. A midfielder, they coincided at Huesca in the 2011–12 season.
