= Iván Hernández (footballer) =

Spanish footballer

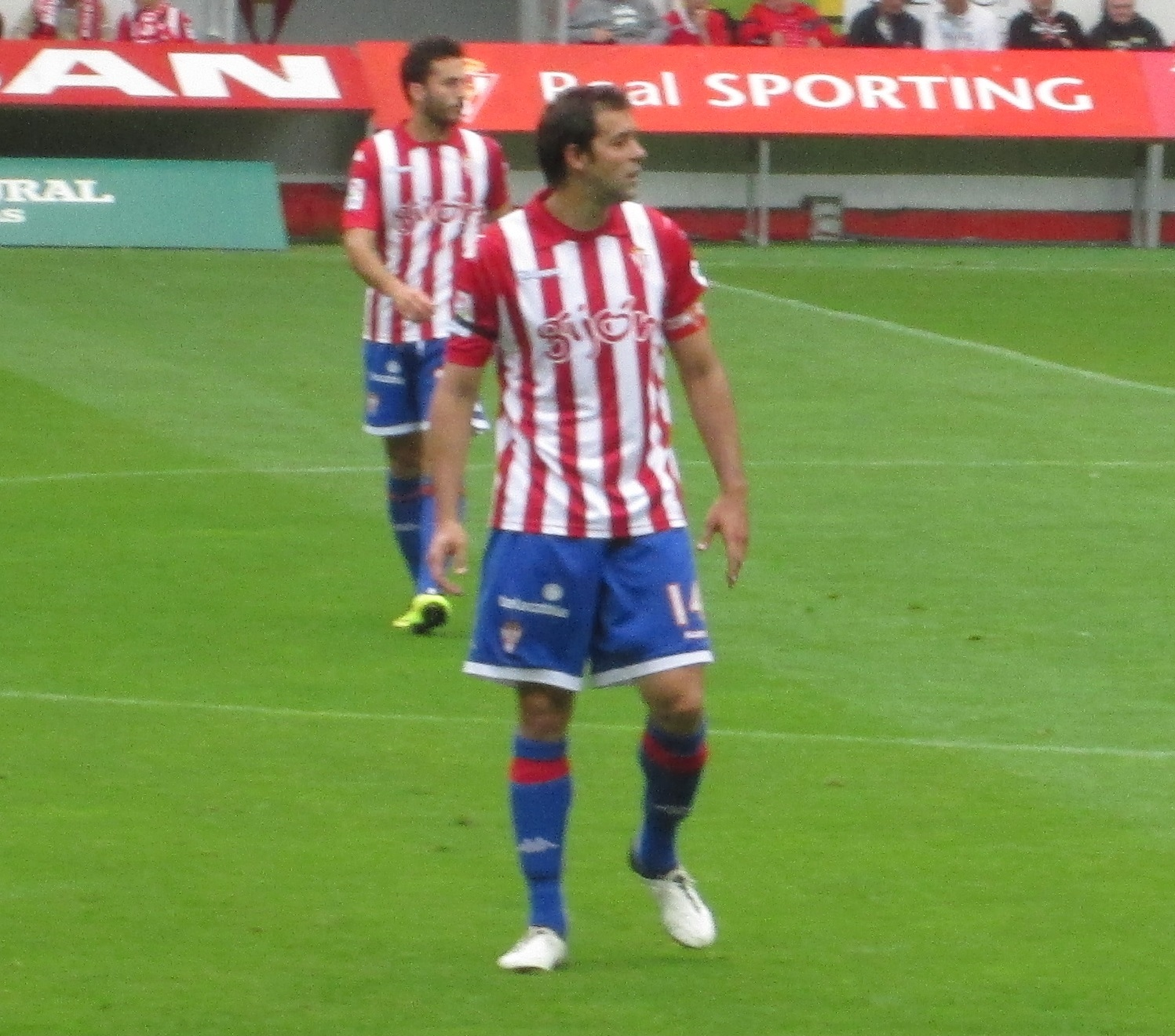
- Hernández with Sporting Gijón in 2014

Personal information
- Full name: Iván Hernández Soto
- Date of birth: 27 February 1980 (age 46)
- Place of birth: Madrid, Spain
- Height: 1.85 m (6 ft 1 in)
- Position: Centre-back

Senior career*
Years	Team	Apps	(Gls)
1998–1999	Moscardó	20	(12)
1999–2000	Amorós	25	(7)
2000–2001	Rayo Majadahonda	36	(2)
2001–2002	Atlético Madrid B	30	(3)
2002–2003	Alcorcón	35	(1)
2003–2005	Málaga B	73	(2)
2005–2007	Valladolid	45	(0)
2007–2015	Sporting Gijón	155	(1)
Total		419	(28)

Managerial career
- 2015–2018: Sporting Gijón B (assistant)
- 2018–2019: Sporting Gijón (assistant)
- * Club domestic league appearances and goals

Iván Hernández Soto (Spanish pronunciation: [iˈβan eɾˈnandeθ]; born 27 February 1980) is a Spanish former professional footballer who played as a central defender.

He spent the better part of his career with Sporting de Gijón after signing in 2007, going on appear in 165 competitive games and take part in four La Liga seasons.

== Club career ==
Hernández was born in Madrid. After having started professionally with modest clubs in the area, he signed for Málaga CF's reserves in 2003, helping the Andalusians to retain their Segunda División status during two seasons.

Hernández played from 2005 to 2007 with Real Valladolid, appearing in 26 games in his second year and achieving his first La Liga promotion. However, he stayed in that tier, joining Sporting de Gijón and being instrumental in the Asturias side's 2008 promotion, while often shifting from defender to defensive midfielder.

Hernández made his top-flight debut on 31 August 2008 at the age of 28, in a 1–2 home loss against Getafe CF. He finished the campaign being one of the team's most used stoppers, as they barely escaped relegation.

Since 2011, Hernández acted as Sporting's main captain. After retiring, he worked as assistant manager to both their first and second teams.
