= Diego Castro (Spanish footballer) =

Spanish footballer (born 1982)

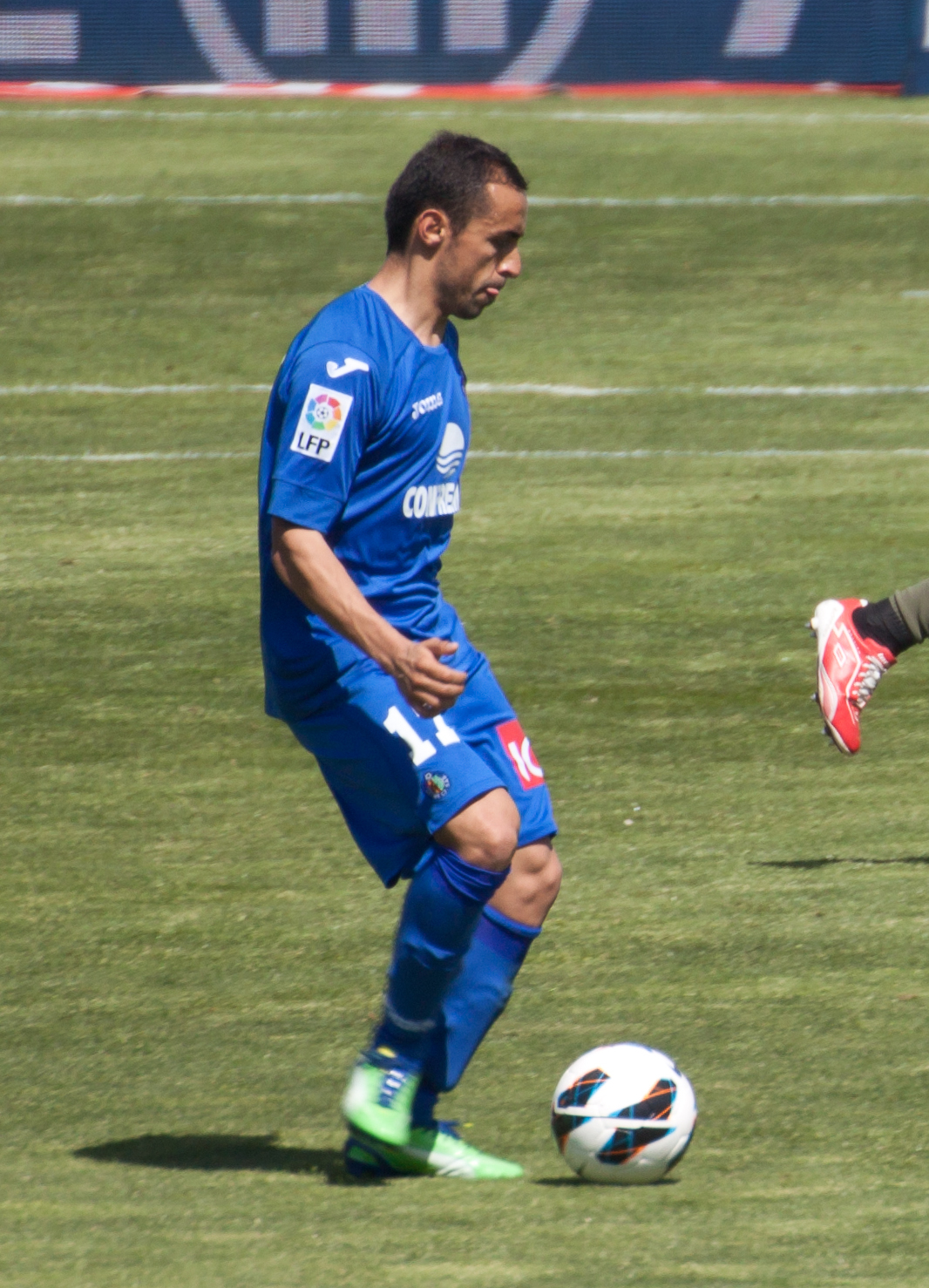
- Castro playing with Getafe in 2013

Personal information
- Full name: Diego Castro Jiménez
- Date of birth: 2 July 1982 (age 44)
- Place of birth: Pontevedra, Spain
- Height: 1.74 m (5 ft 9 in)
- Position: Winger

Youth career
- AJ Lérez

Senior career*
Years	Team	Apps	(Gls)
2001–2003	Pontevedra	54	(11)
2003–2006	Málaga B	90	(2)
2005	Málaga	2	(0)
2006–2011	Sporting Gijón	170	(39)
2011–2015	Getafe	129	(18)
2015–2021	Perth Glory	136	(49)
Total		581	(119)
- * Club domestic league appearances and goals

Diego Castro Jiménez (Spanish pronunciation: [ˈdjeɣo ˈkastɾo]; born 2 July 1982) is a Spanish former professional footballer who played as a left winger.

He amassed La Liga totals of 226 games and 43 goals over eight seasons, mainly representing Getafe (four years) and Sporting de Gijón (three). In 2015 he transferred to Perth Glory, going on to spend six years with them in the A-League.

== Career ==
=== Málaga and Sporting ===
Castro was born in Pontevedra, Galicia. After starting out professionally with local Pontevedra CF (Segunda División B) he moved to Málaga CF, but spent almost three seasons mainly registered with the Andalusians' reserves; in December 2005, he appeared in two consecutive home losses for the main squad, against CA Osasuna (2–1) and Real Madrid (2–0).

After both Málaga teams dropped down a level in 2006, Castro moved to Sporting de Gijón of Segunda División, being an essential first-team element from the start (20 league goals over his first three seasons – with the Asturians achieving La Liga promotion in his third– six of them in 2008–09, as the club narrowly avoided relegation).

In the following campaign, Castro was arguably Sporting's most important player as he topped their scoring charts at ten, four of those coming through penalties. Sporting again managed to stay in the top division.

Castro again led Sporting de Gijón in goals scored in 2010–11, netting one goal less. On 13 March 2011, after Nacho Novo won a penalty kick in the last-minute of an away fixture against Villarreal CF, he converted it in Panenka-style for a final 1–1 draw – the visiting team was then reduced to only nine players.

=== Getafe ===
Shortly after the season ended, Castro confirmed his departure from Sporting as a free agent, signing shortly after for Getafe CF. On 3 June 2015, after four years as first choice, he left the latter after his contract expired.

=== Perth Glory ===
On 6 August 2015, aged 33, Castro moved abroad for the first time in his career, joining A-League club Perth Glory FC as their foreign marquee player. He scored his first goal for his new team on 25 October, contributing to a 3–1 home win against Adelaide United FC. He enjoyed a successful debut season, earning selection for the PFA Team of the Year and winning the Alex Tobin award as well as the Johnny Warren Medal.

On 7 June 2016, Castro extended his stay with Perth Glory, agreeing to a deal believed to be worth approximately $500,000. Before the start of the 2018–19 season, he was named team captain.

Castro agreed to a two-year extension on 23 April 2019. On 14 October 2021, it was confirmed that the 39-year-old would be leaving due to restrictions on visa players and the incoming signing of Daniel Sturridge. A statement from CEO Tony Pignata on the club's official website spoke fondly of the former player, saying:

"Diego has been one of the best players Australian football has ever seen, and undoubtedly Glory’s greatest overseas recruit of all time.

"His place in the pantheon of Glory greats is well and truly assured and on behalf of our Members and fans, I would like to sincerely thank him for the massive contribution he has made over the past six years.

"We have been fortunate to have had the pleasure of watching a player of his quality and he will always remain a cherished and much-loved member of the Glory family.

"We would like to take this opportunity to wish Diego and his family all the very best for the future."

== Personal life ==
Castro's father, Fernando Castro Santos, also had a career intimately connected with football. He coached several teams in the first and second divisions from 1992 (notably SD Compostela), also working in Portugal.

Besides his native language, Castro is also able to speak English, describing it as that he had fully learned the language while in Australia as part of the challenge of playing abroad.

== Career statistics ==
Appearances and goals by club, season and competition
Club	Season	League			Cup		Continental		Total	
Club	Season	Division	Apps	Goals	Apps	Goals	Apps	Goals	Apps	Goals
Pontevedra	2001–02	Segunda División B	21	2	0	0	3 (Note: Appearances in Segunda División B play-offs)	0	24	2
Pontevedra	2002–03	Segunda División B	33	9	2	0	5	3	40	12
Pontevedra	Total		54	11	2	0	8	3	64	14
Málaga B	2003–04	Segunda División	24	0	—		—		24	0
Málaga B	2004–05	Segunda División	33	1	—		—		33	1
Málaga B	2005–06	Segunda División	33	1	—		—		33	1
Málaga B	Total		90	2	—		—		90	2
Málaga	2005–06	La Liga	2	0	0	0	—		2	0
Sporting Gijón	2006–07	Segunda División	38	7	0	0	—		38	7
Sporting Gijón	2007–08	Segunda División	37	7	1	0	—		38	7
Sporting Gijón	2008–09	La Liga	32	6	2	0	—		34	6
Sporting Gijón	2009–10	La Liga	35	10	0	0	—		35	10
Sporting Gijón	2010–11	La Liga	28	9	1	0	—		29	9
Sporting Gijón	Total		170	39	4	0	—		174	39
Getafe	2011–12	La Liga	31	7	0	0	—		31	7
Getafe	2012–13	La Liga	34	7	3	0	—		37	7
Getafe	2013–14	La Liga	32	1	3	0	—		35	1
Getafe	2014–15	La Liga	32	3	4	1	—		36	4
Getafe	Total		129	18	10	1	—		139	19
Perth Glory	2015–16	A-League	26	13	3	0	—		29	13
Perth Glory	2016–17	A-League	27	13	0	0	—		27	13
Perth Glory	2017–18	A-League	22	7	0	0	—		22	7
Perth Glory	2018–19	A-League	22	9	1	0	—		23	9
Perth Glory	2019–20	A-League	18	4	1	0	2	0	21	4
Perth Glory	2020–21	A-League	21	3	0	0	3	0	24	3
Perth Glory	Total		136	49	5	0	5	0	149	49
Career total			581	119	21	1	13	3	615	123

== Honours ==
Perth Glory

- A-League: Premiers 2018–19

Individual

- PFA Team of the Season: 2015–16, 2018–19
- PFA A-League Player of the Month: February 2016, March 2016
- Johnny Warren Medal: 2015–16
