= Gerard Autet =

Spanish footballer

Personal information
- Full name: Gerard Autet Serrabasa
- Date of birth: 8 September 1978 (age 48)
- Place of birth: Manlleu, Spain
- Height: 1.86 m (6 ft 1 in)
- Position: Centre-back

Youth career
- Barcelona

Senior career*
Years	Team	Apps	(Gls)
1997–1998	Barcelona C	26	(1)
1998–1999	Palamós	20	(0)
1999–2001	Espanyol B	60	(4)
2001–2002	Levante	34	(0)
2002–2007	Xerez	134	(0)
2007–2010	Sporting Gijón	68	(1)
2010–2012	Xerez	12	(0)
Total		354	(6)

Managerial career
- 2012: Maccabi Tel Aviv (assistant)
- * Club domestic league appearances and goals

Gerard Autet Serrabasa (born 8 September 1978) is a Spanish former professional footballer who played as a central defender.

== Club career ==
Autet was born in Manlleu, Barcelona, Catalonia. During his early career, he played lower league football with Palamós CF and RCD Espanyol's B team. He subsequently represented Levante UD and Xerez CD, with both clubs competing in the Segunda División.

After five seasons in Andalusia, Autet signed with Sporting de Gijón for the 2007–08 season, being instrumental in the side's promotion to La Liga. His competition debut on 21 September 2008 was a sour one, as the Asturians were crushed 6–1 at home against FC Barcelona and he was sent off before the hour-mark; he did contribute solidly in the club's narrow escape from relegation, appearing in 26 games and scoring in a 2–1 home win over Málaga CF on 17 May 2009.

Only third or fourth-string stopper in the 2009–10 campaign, Autet played only eight league matches, mainly due to suspensions or injuries to either Grégory Arnolin or Alberto Botía. He did start in all of those (seven complete) as Sporting again managed to retain their top-flight status.
