= 2010–11 Copa del Rey =

109th Copa del Rey

Tournament details
- Country: Spain
- Teams: 83

Final positions
- Champions: Real Madrid (18th title)
- Runners-up: Barcelona

Tournament statistics
- Matches played: 112
- Goals scored: 324 (2.89 per match)
- Top goal scorer(s): Lionel Messi; Cristiano Ronaldo (7 goals each)

The 2010–11 Copa del Rey was the 109th staging of the Copa del Rey (including two seasons where two rival editions were played). The competition began on 21 August 2010 and ended on 20 April 2011 with the final, held at the Estadio Mestalla in Valencia, in which Real Madrid lifted the trophy for the eighteenth time in their history with a 1–0 victory over Barcelona in extra time. Sevilla were the defending champions, but they were defeated by Real Madrid in the semi-finals.

== Calendar ==
Round	Date	Fixtures	Clubs	Notes
First round	21–25 August 2010	18	83 → 65	Clubs participating in Tercera and Segunda División B gain entry.
Second Round	1 September 2010	22	65 → 43	Clubs participating in Segunda División gain entry.
Third Round	8 & 15 September 2010	11	43 → 32	
Round of 32	26–28 October 2010	16	32 → 16	Clubs participating in La Liga gain entry.
Round of 32	9–11 November 2010	16	32 → 16	Clubs participating in La Liga gain entry.
Round of 16	21–22 December 2010	8	16 → 8	
Round of 16	5–6 January 2011	8	16 → 8	
Quarterfinals	12–13 January 2011	4	8 → 4	
Quarterfinals	18–20 January 2011	4	8 → 4	
Semifinals	26 January 2011	2	4 → 2	
Semifinals	2 February 2011	2	4 → 2	
Final	20 April 2011	1	2 → 1	

== Qualified teams ==
The following teams competed in the Copa del Rey 2010–11:

20 teams of 2009–10 La Liga:

- Almería
- Athletic Bilbao
- Atlético Madrid
- Barcelona
- Deportivo La Coruña
- Espanyol
- Getafe
- Málaga
- Mallorca
- Osasuna
- Racing Santander
- Real Madrid
- Sevilla
- Sporting Gijón
- Tenerife
- Valencia
- Valladolid
- Villarreal
- Xerez
- Zaragoza

21 teams of 2009–10 Segunda División (Villarreal B are excluded for being a reserve team of Villarreal):

- Albacete
- Betis
- Cádiz
- Cartagena
- Castellón
- Celta
- Córdoba
- Elche
- Gimnàstic de Tarragona
- Girona
- Hércules
- Huesca
- Las Palmas
- Levante
- Murcia
- Numancia
- Rayo Vallecano
- Real Sociedad
- Real Unión
- Recreativo Huelva
- Salamanca

24 teams of 2009–10 Segunda División B. Teams that qualified are the top five teams of each of the 4 groups (excluding reserve teams) and the four with the highest number of points out of the remaining non-reserve teams (*):

- Ponferradina
- Eibar
- Palencia
- Pontevedra
- Alavés
- Alcorcón
- Real Oviedo
- Guadalajara
- Universidad Las Palmas
- Leganés
- Sant Andreu
- Ontinyent
- Alcoyano
- Dénia
- Benidorm
- Granada
- Melilla
- Real Jaén
- Poli Ejido
- Ceuta
- Puertollano*
- Orihuela*
- UD Logroñés*
- Lucena*

18 teams of 2009–10 Tercera División. Teams that qualified are the champions of each of the 18 groups (or at least the ones with the highest number of points within their group since reserve teams are excluded):

- Cerceda
- Caudal
- Noja
- Portugalete
- L'Hospitalet
- Gandía
- Parla
- Burgos
- Atl. Mancha Real
- CD Alcalá
- Atl. Baleares
- Corralejo
- Jumilla
- Badajoz
- Tudelano
- Oyonesa
- Teruel
- La Roda

== First round ==
The matches were played on 21, 22, 24 and 25 August 2010.

Team 1	Score	Team 2
La Roda	1–2	CD Alcalá
Gandía	1–2	Sant Andreu
Oyonesa	0–3	Tudelano
L'Hospitalet	2–1	Dénia
Ceuta	4–1	Atl. Mancha Real
Portugalete	3–2	Noja
Universidad Las Palmas	1–0 (aet)	Leganés
Caudal	4–3 (aet)	Palencia
Real Unión	1–0	Burgos
Pontevedra	0–1	Guadalajara
Alavés	0–1	UD Logroñés
Real Oviedo	1–0 (aet)	Eibar
Benidorm	0–0 (3–5 p)	Orihuela
Ontinyent	0–2	Castellón
Teruel	0–0 (5–4 p)	Atl. Baleares
Badajoz	4–0	Corralejo
Puertollano	0–0 (0–3 p)	Murcia
Parla	1–5	Cádiz

Alcoyano, Cerceda, Jumilla, Lucena, Melilla, Poli Ejido and Real Jaén received a bye.

21 August 2010	La Roda	1–2	CD Alcalá	La Roda
21:00 CEST	Chupi 76'	(Report)	Pulido 23'; Pibe 39'	Stadium: Municipal; Referee: David Gálvez Rascón

22 August 2010	Gandía	1–2	Sant Andreu	Gandia
19:30 CEST	Apesteguia 44'	(Report)	Lluis Blanco 69'; Joel 76'	Stadium: Guillermo Olagüe; Referee: Francisco Villena Contreras

24 August 2010	Oyonesa	0–3	Tudelano	Oyón-Oion
19:00 CEST		(Report)	Chasco 13' (o.g.); Pacheta 23' (pen.); Moreno 54'	Stadium: El Espinar; Referee: Santiago Buesa Abadías

24 August 2010	L'Hospitalet	2–1	Dénia	L'Hospitalet de Llobregat
19:30 CEST	Eloy 83', 89'	(Report)	Pepín 19'	Stadium: La Feixa Llarga; Referee: Cristian Adrian Lixandru

24 August 2010	Ceuta	4–1	Atlético Mancha Real	Ceuta
21:00 CEST	Berrocal 16'; Seguro 35'; David Torres 44'; Guzmán 47'	(Report)	Negro 68'	Stadium: Alfonso Murube; Referee: José Ángel Santos Caballero

25 August 2010	Portugalete	3–2	Noja	Portugalete
18:00 CEST	Salcedo 18'; Javi González 42'; Vidal 64'	(Report)	Camino 15'; Piscu 44'	Stadium: Pasarón; Referee: Fernando Castillejo Álvarez

25 August 2010	Universidad Las Palmas	1–0 (a.e.t.)	Leganés	Las Palmas
18:30 CEST	Ángel Sánchez 98'	(Report)		Stadium: Pepe Gonçalvez; Referee: Jorge Figueroa Vázquez

25 August 2010	Caudal	4–3 (a.e.t.)	Palencia	Mieres, Asturias
19:30 CEST	Pevida 31'; Javi Tapia 101'; Cañedo 108'; Jorge 111'	(Report)	Alejandro 8', 107' (pen.); Paulino 116'	Stadium: Hermanos Antuña; Referee: Ander Zarrabeitia Arrieta

25 August 2010	Real Unión	1–0	Burgos	Irun
19:30 CEST	Luisma 83'	(Report)		Stadium: Gal; Referee: Iker Berjano Ariztegui

25 August 2010	Pontevedra	0–1	Guadalajara	Pontevedra
18:00 CEST		(Report)	Juanjo 60'	Stadium: Pasarón; Referee: Rubén Gómez González

25 August 2010	Alavés	0–1	UD Logroñés	Vitoria-Gasteiz
20:30 CEST		(Report)	Cervero 26'	Stadium: Mendizorrotza; Referee: Fernando Román Román

25 August 2010	Real Oviedo	1–0 (a.e.t.)	SD Eibar	Oviedo
20:30 CEST	Busto 115'	(Report)		Stadium: Carlos Tartiere; Referee: Julián García García

25 August 2010	Benidorm	0–0 (a.e.t.) (3–5 p)	Orihuela	Benidorm
20:30 CEST		(Report)		Stadium: Guillermo Amor; Referee: Francisco José Gómez Liarte
	Penalties
	Yahvé (penalty scored); Cubillas (penalty scored); Banegas (penalty scored); Navarro (penalty missed)		(penalty scored) Álvaro; (penalty scored) Carmona; (penalty scored) Villanueva; (penalty scored) Cases; (penalty scored) Rodri

25 August 2010	Ontinyent	0–2	Castellón	Ontinyent
20:30 CEST		(Report)	Raúl Muñoz 22'; Vicente 54'	Stadium: El Clariano; Referee: Francisco Alejandro Navarro Fuentes

25 August 2010	Teruel	0–0 (a.e.t.) (5–4 p)	Atlético Baleares	Teruel
20:30 CEST		(Report)		Stadium: Pinilla; Referee: Antonio García Castillo
	Penalties
	Enric Pi (penalty scored); David Pérez (penalty missed); Juli (penalty scored); Borja (penalty scored); Joselu (penalty scored); Aimar (penalty scored)		(penalty scored) Checa; (penalty missed) Aarón; (penalty scored) Del Castillo; (penalty scored) Edet; (penalty scored) Óscar Tena; (penalty missed) Coco

25 August 2010	Badajoz	4–0	Corralejo	Badajoz
21:00 CEST	Ruby 25'; Juan Carlos 36'; Etamané 65'; Cajoto 82'	(Report)		Stadium: Nuevo Vivero; Referee: Alonso Vizuete Sánchez

25 August 2010	Puertollano	0–0 (a.e.t.) (0–3 p)	Murcia	Puertollano
21:00 CEST		(Report)		Stadium: Francisco Sánchez Menor; Referee: José Luis Munuera Montero
	Penalties
	Addison (penalty missed); Pelegrina (penalty missed); Acorán (penalty missed)		(penalty scored) Kike García; (penalty missed) Luciano; (penalty scored) Góngora

25 August 2010	Parla	1–5	Cádiz	Parla
21:00 CEST	José Sánchez 47'	(Report)	Velasco 3', 7', 50'; Dieguito 34'; Enrique 66'	Stadium: Los Prados; Referee: Carlos Moreno Hidalgo

== Second round ==
The matches were played on 1 September 2010.

Orihuela received a bye.

1 September 2010	Tudelano	0–2	Lucena	Tudela
18:30 CEST		(Report)	Pineda 18'; Obregón 34'	Stadium: Estadio José Antonio Elola; Referee: Óscar Herrero Arenas

1 September 2010	Caudal	0–1 (aet)	Universidad LPGC	Mieres
20:15 CEST		(Report)	Aridane 119'	Stadium: Estadio Hermanos Antuña; Referee: Alberto Díaz Arias

1 September 2010	Teruel	0–1	Real Unión	Teruel
20:30 CEST		(Report)	Brit 90+1'	Stadium: Estadio Pinilla; Referee: Francisco Javier Mateo Valero

1 September 2010	UD Logroñés	0–0 (aet) (4–3 p)	Cerceda	Logroño
20:30 CEST		(Report)		Stadium: Nuevo Las Gaunas; Referee: Víctor Manuel Gómez Ríos
	Penalties
	Gaspar (penalty scored); Borrell (penalty scored); Cervero (penalty scored); Gibanel (penalty scored)		(penalty scored) Cabrejo; (penalty scored) Barreiro; (penalty missed) Veiga; (penalty scored) Franqueira; (penalty missed) Xaco

1 September 2010	CD Alcalá	1–3 (aet)	Sant Andreu	El Viso del Alcor
20:30 CEST	Mustafá 49'	(Report)	Matamala 7'; Manteca 92', 100'	Stadium: Estadio Francisco Bono; Referee: Juan Francisco García Cabrera

1 September 2010	Real Oviedo	2–2 (aet) (4–5 p)	Real Murcia	Oviedo
20:30 CEST	Negredo 42'; Perona 89'	(Report)	Kike 26' (pen.); Abraham 39'	Stadium: Nuevo Carlos Tartiere; Referee: Manuel Vidal Araujo
	Penalties
	Negredo (penalty scored); Busto (penalty scored); Díaz (penalty scored); Perona (penalty scored); Jorge Rodríguez (penalty missed)		(penalty scored) Albiol; (penalty scored) Rosquete; (penalty scored) Luciano; (penalty scored) Góngora; (penalty scored) Urzaiz

1 September 2010	Jumilla	0–1 (aet)	Melilla	Jumilla
20:30 CEST		(Report)	Chota 92'	Stadium: Estadio Municipal de la Hoya; Referee: Enrique Sanchís Cambra

1 September 2010	Valladolid	5–3	Las Palmas	Valladolid
20:30 CEST	Calle 28' (pen.), 33'; Nauzet 75'; Álvaro Antón 80'; Jofre 86'	(Report)	Larena 40' (pen.); Vicente Gómez 81'; Pedro Vega 87'	Stadium: Estadio José Zorrilla; Attendance: 7,211; Referee: Pedro Pérez Montero

1 September 2010	Gimnàstic	1–2	Xerez	Tarragona
20:30 CEST	Noriega 63' (pen.)	(Report)	Antoñito 36'; Lombán 39'	Stadium: Nou Estadi; Referee: Pedro Sureda Cuenca

1 September 2010	Castellón	2–3	Portugalete	Castellón
21:00 CEST	Lolo 23'; Denis 46'	(Report)	Gondra 72'; Pinilla 75'; Pérez 87'	Stadium: Nou Estadi Castalia; Referee: Gustavo Rebollo López

1 September 2010	Badajoz	2–0 (aet)	Real Jaén	Badajoz
21:00 CEST	Aloisio 111'; Ortiz 116'	(Report)		Stadium: Estadio Nuevo Vivero; Referee: Dámaso Arcediano Monescillo

1 September 2010	Cádiz	3–1	L'Hospitalet	Cádiz
21:00 CEST	Bueno 8'; Caballero 51', 65'	(Report)	Cirio 27'	Stadium: Estadio Ramón de Carranza; Referee: Fernando López Acera

1 September 2010	Ceuta	2–1	Guadalajara	Ceuta
21:00 CEST	Guzmán 63'; Ormazábal 76'	(Report)	Iván Moreno 90+1'	Stadium: Estadio Alfonso Murube; Referee: Ramón del Olmo Codes

1 September 2010	Poli Ejido	1–0	Alcoyano	El Ejido
21:00 CEST	Cara 30'	(Report)		Stadium: Estadio Municipal Santo Domingo; Referee: Alfonso Melgares de Aguilar

1 September 2010	Córdoba	1–0 (aet)	Numancia	Córdoba
21:00 CEST	Arteaga 114'	(Report)		Stadium: Estadio Nuevo Arcángel; Referee: Francisco Javier Ontanaya López-Astilleros

1 September 2010	Ponferradina	1–0	Recreativo	Ponferrada
21:00 CEST	Iván Pérez 10'	(Report)		Stadium: Estadio El Toralín; Referee: Julio Amoedo Chas

1 September 2010	Betis	2–1	Salamanca	Sevilla
21:00 CEST	Beñat 49'; Castro 72'	(Report)	Perico 40'	Stadium: Estadio Benito Villamarín; Referee: Alfonso Pino Zamorano

1 September 2010	Alcorcón	3–2 (aet)	Celta	Alcorcón
21:00 CEST	Quini 44' (pen.), 92'; Borja 89'	(Report)	Abalo 12'; Aspas 52'	Stadium: Estadio Santo Domingo; Referee: Daniel Jesús Trujillo Suárez

1 September 2010	Elche	4–1	Tenerife	Elche
21:00 CEST	Perera 4', 76'; Wakaso 11'; Linares 73'	(Report)	Nino 23'	Stadium: Estadio Manuel Martínez Valero; Referee: Antonio Israel Mariscal Sánchez

1 September 2010	Girona	1–1 (aet) (3–5 p)	Huesca	Girona
21:00 CEST	Despotović 3'	(Report)	Roberto 51' (pen.)	Stadium: Estadi Montilivi; Referee: Juan Martínez Munuera
	Penalties
	Chechu (penalty scored); Ángel (penalty scored); Despotović (penalty missed); Bautista (penalty scored)		(penalty scored) Camacho; (penalty scored) Galán; (penalty scored) Navas; (penalty scored) Víctor Pérez; (penalty scored) Helguera

1 September 2010	Albacete	0–2	Granada	Albacete
21:30 CEST		(Report)	Geijo 40', 43'	Stadium: Estadio Carlos Belmonte; Referee: Jorge Valdés Aller

1 September 2010	Cartagena	1–3	Rayo Vallecano	Cartagena
21:30 CEST	Toché 38'	(Report)	Provencio 58'; Aganzo 72'; Trejo 88'	Stadium: Estadio Cartagonova; Referee: Mario Melero López

== Third round ==
The matches were played on 8 and 15 September 2010.

Portugalete received a bye.

8 September 2010	Badajoz	0–2	UD Logroñés	Badajoz
20:00 CEST		(Report)	Cervero 69' (pen.), 81' (pen.)	Stadium: Estadio Nuevo Vivero; Referee: Enrique Ortiz Blanco

8 September 2010	Valladolid	1–0	Huesca	Valladolid
20:00 CEST	Alonso 8' (pen.)	(Report)		Stadium: Estadio José Zorrilla; Referee: José Ramón Piñeiro Crespo

8 September 2010	Sant Andreu	0–1	Murcia	Barcelona
20:30 CEST		(Report)	Pedro 62'	Stadium: Camp Municipal Narcís Sala; Referee: Iván González González

8 September 2010	Melilla	2–2 (a.e.t.) (6–7 p)	Ceuta	Melilla
20:45 CEST	David Vázquez 38'; Ramos 101'	(Report)	Navarro 90+3', 107'	Stadium: Estadio Municipal Álvarez Claro; Attendance: 1,000; Referee: Domingo Palomino Núñez
	Penalties
	Ramos (penalty scored); David Vázquez (penalty scored); Zamorano (penalty scored); Carlos Ruiz (penalty missed); Sergio Rodríguez (penalty scored); Castells (penalty scored); Mahanan (penalty scored); Amarito (penalty missed)		(penalty missed) Cañas; (penalty scored) Seguro; (penalty scored) Navarro; (penalty scored) Mansilla; (penalty scored) Guzmán; (penalty scored) Baigorri; (penalty scored) Moreno; (penalty scored) Zamora

8 September 2010	Lucena	0–1	Universidad LPGC	Lucena
21:00 CEST		(Report)	Aridane 77'	Stadium: Estadio Municipal de Lucena; Referee: Carlos López López

8 September 2010	Real Unión	1–0 (a.e.t.)	Orihuela	Irún
21:00 CEST	Castellano 115'	(Report)		Stadium: Estadio Gal; Referee: Julio Fermín Leo Ollo

8 September 2010	Granada	2–2 (a.e.t.) (4–5 p)	Betis	Granada
21:00 CEST	Benítez 38' (pen.), 46'	(Report)	Emana 62'; Castro 73'	Stadium: Estadio Nuevo Los Cármenes; Referee: José Luis Lesma López
	Penalties
	Pérez (penalty scored); Lucena (penalty scored); Barrancos (penalty scored); Geijo (penalty missed); Muriel (penalty scored)		(penalty scored) Caffa; (penalty scored) Sevilla; (penalty scored) Castro; (penalty scored) Emana; (penalty scored) Dorado

8 September 2010	Elche	1–2	Xerez	Elche
21:15 CEST	Perera 87'	(Report)	Cordero 66'; Bermejo 70'	Stadium: Estadio Manuel Martínez Valero; Referee: Andrés Manuel Ceballos Silva

8 September 2010	Poli Ejido	1–0	Cádiz	El Ejido
21:30 CEST	Katxorro 89'	(Report)		Stadium: Estadio Municipal Santo Domingo; Referee: Diego Sebastián López Martínez

8 September 2010	Córdoba	2–1 (a.e.t.)	Rayo Vallecano	Córdoba
22:00 CEST	Flores 21'; Aguilar 92'	(Report)	Coke 51'	Stadium: Estadio Nuevo Arcángel; Referee: Santiago Jaime Latre

15 September 2010	Alcorcón	1–1 (a.e.t.) (3–1 p)	Ponferradina	Alcorcón
21:00 CEST	Borja 61'	(Report)	Yuri 83'	Stadium: Santo Domingo; Referee: Jesús Gil Manzano
	Penalties
	Quini (penalty scored); Alberdi (penalty missed); Mora (penalty scored); Carlos Martínez (penalty scored)		(penalty missed) Salas; (penalty missed) Redondo; (penalty scored) Máyor

== Final phase ==
=== Draw ===
The draw for the Round of 32 was held on 22 September 2010 at 13:00 CET in the Ciudad del Fútbol de Las Rozas in Madrid.

Pot 1 teams (Segunda B and Tercera divisions) were drawn against four teams from pot 2 with the first leg at pot 1 team's home. The three remaining teams in pot 1 were paired in the same way with the pot 3 teams. The teams in the special pot 1 (Segunda A) were drawn against five teams in the special pot 2, with the first leg at the home ground of the special pot 1 teams. The remaining teams in the special pot 2 faced each other

Pot 1	Pot 2 (Champions League)	Pot 3 (Europa League)	Special pot 1 (Segunda División)	Special pot 2
Portugalete; Real Unión; Poli Ejido; Murcia; Universidad LPGC; Logroñés; Ceuta	Sevilla (holders); Barcelona; Real Madrid; Valencia	Atlético Madrid; Getafe; Villarreal	Betis; Valladolid; Córdoba; Xerez; Alcorcón	Athletic Bilbao; Espanyol; Osasuna; Real Sociedad; Sporting de Gijón; Mallorca; Hércules; Deportivo La Coruña; Málaga; Racing Santander; Almería; Zaragoza; Levante

=== Bracket ===
Round of 32; 26/27/28 October 2010; 9/10/11 November 2010
Logroñés	0	1	1
Valencia	3	4	7
Poli Ejido	1	0	1
Villarreal	1	2	3
Real Unión	0	1	1
Sevilla	4	6	10
Hércules	0	2	2
Málaga	0	3	3
Murcia	0	1	1
Real Madrid	0	5	5
Xerez	2	2	4
Levante (a)	3	1	4
Universidad LPGC	0	1	1
Atlético Madrid	5	1	6
Valladolid	0	1	1
Espanyol	2	1	3
Ceuta	0	1	1
Barcelona	2	5	7
Alcorcón	0	0	0
Athletic Bilbao	1	2	3
Betis (a)	0	2	2
Zaragoza	1	1	2
Portugalete	1	0	1
Getafe (a)	1	0	1
Real Sociedad	2	1	3
Almería	3	2	5
Mallorca	3	2	5
Sporting de Gijón	1	2	3
Córdoba (aet)	2	1	3
Racing Santander	0	3	3
Osasuna	1	1	2
Deportivo La Coruña	1	2	3

Round of 16; 21/22 December 2010; 5/6 January 2011
Valencia	0	2	2
Villarreal	0	4	4
Sevilla	5	3	8
Málaga	3	0	3
Real Madrid	8	0	8
Levante	0	2	2
Atlético Madrid	1	1	2
Espanyol	0	1	1
Barcelona (a)	0	1	1
Athletic Bilbao	0	1	1
Betis	1	3	4
Getafe	2	1	3
Almería	4	4	8
Mallorca	3	3	6
Córdoba	1	1	2
Deportivo La Coruña (aet)	1	3	4

Quarterfinals; 12/13 January 2011; 18/19/20 January 2011
Villarreal	3	0	3
Sevilla	3	3	6
Real Madrid	3	1	4
Atlético Madrid	1	0	1
Barcelona	5	1	6
Betis	0	3	3
Almería	1	3	4
Deportivo La Coruña	0	2	2

Semifinals; 26 January 2011; 2 February 2011
Sevilla	0	0	0
Real Madrid	1	2	3
Barcelona	5	3	8
Almería	0	0	0

Final; 20 April 2011
Real Madrid (aet)	1
Barcelona	0

== Round of 32 ==
The first leg matches were played on 26, 27 and 28 October while the second legs were played on 9, 10 and 11 November 2010.

Team 1	Agg.	Team 2	1st leg	2nd leg
Murcia	1−5	Real Madrid	0−0	1−5
Real Unión	1−10	Sevilla	0−4	1−6
UD Logroñés	1−7	Valencia	0−3	1−4
Ceuta	1−7	Barcelona	0−2	1−5
Poli Ejido	1−3	Villarreal	1−1	0−2
Universidad LPGC	1−6	Atlético Madrid	0−5	1−1
Portugalete	1−1 (a)	Getafe	1−1	0−0
Valladolid	1−3	Espanyol	0−2	1−1
Betis	2−2 (a)	Zaragoza	0−1	2−1
Xerez	4−4 (a)	Levante	2−3	2−1
Córdoba	3−3 (aet) (a)	Racing Santander	2−0	1−3
Alcorcón	0−3	Athletic Bilbao	0−1	0−2
Osasuna	2−3	Deportivo La Coruña	1−1	1−2
Real Sociedad	3−5	Almería	2−3	1−2
Mallorca	5−3	Sporting de Gijón	3−1	2−2
Hércules	2−3	Málaga	0−0	2−3

=== First leg ===
26 October 2010	Murcia	0–0	Real Madrid	Murcia
20:00 CEST		(Report)		Stadium: Nueva Condomina; Attendance: 20,674; Referee: Miguel Ángel Ayza Gámez

26 October 2010	Ceuta	0–2	Barcelona	Ceuta
22:00 CEST		(Report)	Maxwell 15'; Pedro 25'	Stadium: Estadio Alfonso Murube; Attendance: 6,000; Referee: Rafael Ramírez Domínguez

27 October 2010	Real Unión	0–4	Sevilla	Irún
20:00 CEST		(Report)	Negredo 44', 68'; Alfaro 87'; José Carlos 90+2'	Stadium: Stadium Gal; Attendance: 4,500; Referee: Alfonso Álvarez Izquierdo

27 October 2010	Logroñés	0–3	Valencia	Logroño
20:00 CEST		(Report)	Aduriz 55', 59'; Vicente 79'	Stadium: Estadio Las Gaunas; Attendance: 8,000; Referee: Alberto Undiano Mallenco

27 October 2010	Poli Ejido	1–1	Villarreal	El Ejido
21:00 CEST	Moreno 89'	(Report)	Altidore 44'	Stadium: Estadio Municipal Santo Domingo; Attendance: 3,500; Referee: Carlos Velasco Carballo

27 October 2010	Portugalete	1–1	Getafe	Portugalete
21:00 CEST	Bergara 52'	(Report)	Sardinero 6'	Stadium: Estadio La Florida; Attendance: 4,000; Referee: José Antonio Teixeira Vitienes

27 October 2010	Valladolid	0–2	Espanyol	Valladolid
21:00 CEST		(Report)	Álvaro 38', 54'	Stadium: Estadio José Zorrilla; Attendance: 7,900; Referee: Fernando Teixeira Vitienes

27 October 2010	Xerez	2–3	Levante	Jerez de la Frontera
21:00 CEST	José Mari 32'; Bermejo 69'	(Report)	Stuani 59', 81'; Robusté 88'	Stadium: Estadio Municipal de Chapín; Attendance: 4,029; Referee: Antonio Rubinos Pérez

27 October 2010	Córdoba	2–0	Racing Santander	Córdoba
21:00 CEST	Riera 25'; Díaz de Cerio 75'	(Report)		Stadium: Estadio Nuevo Arcángel; Attendance: 5,000; Referee: José Luis González González

27 October 2010	Hércules	0–0	Málaga	Alicante
21:00 CEST		(Report)		Stadium: Estadio José Rico Pérez; Attendance: 10,000; Referee: Javier Turienzo Álvarez

27 October 2010	Mallorca	3–1	Sporting de Gijón	Palma
21:00 CEST	Cavenaghi 11', 33'; Rubén 89'	(Report)	Barral 59'	Stadium: Iberostar; Attendance: 9,774; Referee: Carlos Delgado Ferreiro

27 October 2010	Universidad LPGC	0–5	Atlético Madrid	Las Palmas de Gran Canaria
22:00 CEST; 21:00 Local time		(Report)	Godín 23'; Agüero 41', 52'; Costa 48'; Mérida 83'	Stadium: Estadio Gran Canaria; Attendance: 13,161; Referee: José Luis Paradas Romero

27 October 2010	Betis	0–1	Zaragoza	Seville
22:00 CEST		(Report)	Gabi 61' (pen.)	Stadium: Estadio Benito Villamarín; Attendance: 15,000; Referee: Javier Estrada Fernández

28 October 2010	Alcorcón	0–1	Athletic Bilbao	Alcorcón
20:00 CEST		(Report)	Gurpegui 54'	Stadium: Santo Domingo; Attendance: 4,500; Referee: Ignacio Iglesias Villanueva

28 October 2010	Osasuna	1–1	Deportivo La Coruña	Pamplona
21:00 CEST	Juanfran 67'	(Report)	Saúl 70'	Stadium: Estadio Reyno de Navarra; Attendance: 11,286; Referee: Carlos Clos Gómez

28 October 2010	Real Sociedad	2–3	Almería	San Sebastián
22:00 CEST	Sarpong 6'; Elustondo 31'	(Report)	Ansotegui 66' (o.g.); Ulloa 71', 87'	Stadium: Estádio Anoeta; Attendance: 15,000; Referee: César Muñiz Fernández

=== Second leg ===
9 November 2010	Racing Santander	3–1 (aet) (3–3a agg.)	Córdoba	Santander
20:00 CET	Bolado 26'; Bakircioglü 71'; Bedia 102'	(Report)	Luque 118' (pen.)	Stadium: Estadio El Sardinero; Attendance: 6,293; Referee: Carlos Delgado Ferreiro

9 November 2010	Espanyol	1–1 (3–1 agg.)	Valladolid	Cornellà de Llobregat
22:00 CET	Osvaldo 67'	(Report)	Barragán 76' (pen.)	Stadium: Nou Estadi Cornellà-El Prat; Attendance: 10,120; Referee: César Muñiz Fernández

10 November 2010	Real Madrid	5–1 (5–1 agg.)	Murcia	Madrid
20:00 CET	Granero 3'; Higuaín 44'; Ronaldo 74'; Benzema 84' (pen.); Alonso 88'	(Report)	Pedro 81' (pen.)	Stadium: Estadio Santiago Bernabéu; Attendance: 75,000; Referee: José Luis Paradas Romero

10 November 2010	Zaragoza	1–2 (2–2a agg.)	Betis	Zaragoza
20:00 CET	Jarošík 14'	(Report)	Contini 11' (o.g.); Castro 38'	Stadium: La Romareda; Attendance: 11,000; Referee: Eduardo Iturralde González

10 November 2010	Sevilla	6–1 (10–1 agg.)	Real Unión	Seville
21:00 CET	Alfaro 15' (pen.); Rodri 27'; Bernardo 41'; Cigarini 57'; José Carlos 73'; Acosta 85'	(Report)	Romo 12'	Stadium: Ramón Sánchez Pizjuán Stadium; Attendance: 10,000; Referee: Miguel Ángel Ayza Gámez

10 November 2010	Villarreal	2–0 (3–1 agg.)	Poli Ejido	Villarreal
21:00 CET	Montero 17'; Altidore 90'	(Report)		Stadium: El Madrigal; Attendance: 10,000; Referee: Javier Turienzo Álvarez

10 November 2010	Atlético Madrid	1–1 (6–1 agg.)	Universidad LPGC	Madrid
21:00 CET	Mérida 72'	(Report)	Aridane 18'	Stadium: Estadio Vicente Calderón; Attendance: 5,000; Referee: José Antonio Teixeira Vitienes

10 November 2010	Levante	1–2 (4a–4 agg.)	Xerez	Valencia
21:00 CET	Caicedo 44'	(Report)	Antoñito 25' (pen.), 57'	Stadium: Estadio Ciudad de Valencia; Attendance: 5,000; Referee: Alfonso Álvarez Izquierdo

10 November 2010	Deportivo La Coruña	2–1 (3–2 agg.)	Osasuna	A Coruña
21:00 CET	Riki 53'; Lassad 63'	(Report)	Lekić 61'	Stadium: Estadio Riazor; Attendance: 12,000; Referee: David Fernández Borbalán

10 November 2010	Almería	2–1 (5–3 agg.)	Real Sociedad	Almería
21:00 CET	Goitom 21'; Ulloa 47'	(Report)	Agirretxe 50'	Stadium: Estadio de los Juegos Mediterráneos; Attendance: 7,275; Referee: Antonio Mateu Lahoz

10 November 2010	Barcelona	5–1 (7–1 agg.)	Ceuta	Barcelona
22:00 CET	Nolito 2'; Milito 6'; Pedro 49'; Bojan 64'; Messi 67'	(Report)	Guzmán 34'	Stadium: Camp Nou; Attendance: 38,971; Referee: Ignacio Iglesias Villanueva

10 November 2010	Athletic Bilbao	2–0 (3–0 agg.)	Alcorcón	Bilbao
22:00 CET	Gabilondo 25'; Orbaiz 90'	(Report)		Stadium: San Mamés; Attendance: 20,000; Referee: José Luis González González

11 November 2010	Getafe	0–0 (1a–1 agg.)	Portugalete	Getafe
20:00 CET		(Report)		Stadium: El Coliséum; Attendance: 4,000; Referee: Rafael Ramírez Domínguez

11 November 2010	Sporting de Gijón	2–2 (3–5 agg.)	Mallorca	Gijón
21:00 CET	Bilić 25' (pen.); Muñiz 63'	(Report)	Nsue 10', 15'	Stadium: El Molinón; Attendance: 15,000; Referee: Miguel Ángel Pérez Lasa

11 November 2010	Valencia	4–1 (7–1 agg.)	Logroñés	Valencia
21:00 CET	Isco 24', 43'; Vicente 34'; Feghouli 86'	(Report)	Osado 3'	Stadium: Estadio Mestalla; Attendance: 5,000; Referee: Antonio Rubinos Pérez

11 November 2010	Málaga	3–2 (3–2 agg.)	Hércules	Málaga
22:00 CET	Eliseu 11'; Edinho 15'; Fernández 90'	(Report)	Portillo 31'; Aguilar 63'	Stadium: Estadio La Rosaleda; Attendance: 5,000; Referee: Carlos Velasco Carballo

== Round of 16 ==
The draw for the Round of 16, Quarterfinals and Semifinals was held on 18 November 2010 at 13:00 CET in the Ciudad del Fútbol de Las Rozas in Madrid.

The first leg matches were played on 21 and 22 December while the second legs were played on 5 and 6 January 2011.

Team 1	Agg.	Team 2	1st leg	2nd leg
Sevilla	8–3	Málaga	5–3	3–0
Córdoba	2–4(aet)	Deportivo La Coruña	1–1	1–3
Barcelona	1–1(a)	Athletic Bilbao	0–0	1–1
Betis	4–3	Getafe	1–2	3–1
Almería	8–6	Mallorca	4–3	4–3
Valencia	2–4	Villarreal	0–0	2–4
Atlético Madrid	2–1	Espanyol	1–0	1–1
Real Madrid	8–2	Levante	8–0	0–2

=== First leg ===
21 December 2010	Barcelona	0–0	Athletic Bilbao	Barcelona
20:00 CET		(Report)		Stadium: Camp Nou; Attendance: 45,207; Referee: Antonio Mateu Lahoz

21 December 2010	Córdoba	1–1	Deportivo La Coruña	Córdoba
20:00 CET	Díaz 70'	(Report)	Riki 17' (pen.)	Stadium: Estadio Nuevo Arcángel; Attendance: 5,000; Referee: José Luis González González

21 December 2010	Valencia	0–0	Villarreal	Valencia
22:00 CET		(Report)		Stadium: Mestalla Stadium; Attendance: 20,000; Referee: Carlos Delgado Ferreiro

22 December 2010	Betis	1–2	Getafe	Seville
20:00 CET	Molina 87' (pen.)	(Report)	Miku 27'; Ríos 35'	Stadium: Estadio Benito Villamarín; Attendance: 20,000; Referee: Miguel Ángel Ayza Gámez

22 December 2010	Almería	4–3	Mallorca	Almería
20:00 CET	Ulloa 6', 29', 72'; Uche 66'	(Report)	De Guzmán 22'; Víctor 45+1'; Webó 87'	Stadium: Estadio de los Juegos Mediterráneos; Attendance: 1,500; Referee: Fernando Teixeira Vitienes

22 December 2010	Sevilla	5–3	Málaga	Seville
20:00 CET	Alfaro 11'; Negredo 32'; Romaric 66', 80'; Capel 82'	(Report)	Rondón 19', 26'; Owusu-Abeyie 41'	Stadium: Estadio Ramón Sánchez Pizjuán; Attendance: 20,000; Referee: Eduardo Iturralde González

22 December 2010	Atlético Madrid	1–0	Espanyol	Madrid
20:00 CET	Simão 33' (pen.)	(Report)		Stadium: Estadio Vicente Calderón; Attendance: 18,000; Referee: David Fernández Borbalán

22 December 2010	Real Madrid	8–0	Levante	Madrid
22:00 CET	Benzema 5', 31', 69'; Özil 9'; Ronaldo 45', 72', 74'; Pedro León 90'	(Report)		Stadium: Santiago Bernabéu Stadium; Attendance: 50,000; Referee: Javier Turienzo Álvarez

=== Second leg ===
5 January 2011	Málaga	0–3 (3–8 agg.)	Sevilla	Málaga
18:00 CET		(Report)	Romaric 51'; Perotti 65'; Luís Fabiano 89'	Stadium: La Rosaleda Stadium; Attendance: 12,000; Referee: Ignacio Iglesias Villanueva

5 January 2011	Deportivo La Coruña	3–1 (aet) (4–2 agg.)	Córdoba	A Coruña
20:00 CET	Adrián 90' (pen.), 101', 120' (pen.)	(Report)	Arteaga 86'	Stadium: Estadio Riazor; Attendance: 5,000; Referee: Alfonso Álvarez Izquierdo

5 January 2011	Athletic Bilbao	1–1 (1–1a agg.)	Barcelona	Bilbao
22:00 CET	Llorente 84'	(Report)	Abidal 74'	Stadium: Estadio San Mamés; Attendance: 39,750; Referee: César Muñiz Fernández

6 January 2011	Getafe	1–3 (3–4 agg.)	Betis	Getafe
12:00 CET	Casquero 90+2'	(Report)	Molina 56'; Castro 72', 90'	Stadium: El Coliséum; Attendance: 7,000; Referee: Carlos Clos Gómez

6 January 2011	Mallorca	3–4 (6–8 agg.)	Almería	Palma
16:00 CET	Cavenaghi 69', 76'; Pereira 75'	(Report)	Piatti 1', 41'; Ortiz 3', 33'	Stadium: Iberostar; Attendance: 6,000; Referee: Alberto Undiano Mallenco

6 January 2011	Villarreal	4–2 (4–2 agg.)	Valencia	Villarreal
18:00 CET	Cazorla 46'; Rossi 49' (pen.), 90+3'; Ruben 63'	(Report)	Banega 5'; Soldado 23'	Stadium: Estadio El Madrigal; Attendance: 25,000; Referee: Rafael Ramírez Domínguez

6 January 2011	Espanyol	1–1 (1–2 agg.)	Atlético Madrid	Cornellà de Llobregat
20:00 CET	L. García 90+2'	(Report)	Agüero 24'	Stadium: Nou Estadi Cornellà-El Prat; Attendance: 25,000; Referee: Miguel Ángel Pérez Lasa

6 January 2011	Levante	2–0 (2–8 agg.)	Real Madrid	Valencia
22:00 CET	Xisco 61' (pen.); Sergio 86'	(Report)		Stadium: Estadio Ciutat de València; Attendance: 18,000; Referee: Xavier Estrada Fernández

== Quarter-finals ==
The first leg matches were played on 12 and 13 January while the second legs were played on 18, 19 and 20 January 2011.

Team 1	Agg.	Team 2	1st leg	2nd leg
Villarreal	3–6	Sevilla	3–3	0–3
Almería	4–2	Deportivo La Coruña	1–0	3–2
Barcelona	6–3	Betis	5–0	1–3
Real Madrid	4–1	Atlético Madrid	3–1	1–0

=== First leg ===
12 January 2011	Villarreal	3–3	Sevilla	Villarreal
20:00 CET	Cani 24'; Rossi 29'; Ruben 55'	(Report)	Negredo 39', 60'; Alexis 88'	Stadium: Estadio El Madrigal; Attendance: 23,000; Referee: Alberto Undiano Mallenco

12 January 2011	Barcelona	5–0	Betis	Barcelona
22:00 CET	Messi 44', 62', 73'; Pedro 75'; Keita 82'	(Report)		Stadium: Camp Nou; Attendance: 60,000; Referee: Carlos Velasco Carballo

13 January 2011	Almería	1–0	Deportivo La Coruña	Almería
20:00 CET	Rindarøy 34' (o.g.)	(Report)		Stadium: Estadio de los Juegos Mediterráneos; Attendance: 3,500; Referee: Javier Estrada Fernández

13 January 2011	Real Madrid	3–1	Atlético Madrid	Madrid
22:00 CET	Ramos 14'; Ronaldo 61'; Özil 90'	(Report)	Forlán 7'	Stadium: Estadio Santiago Bernabéu; Attendance: 75,000; Referee: Antonio Mateu Lahoz

=== Second leg ===
18 January 2011	Sevilla	3–0 (6–3 agg.)	Villarreal	Seville
22:00 CET	Renato 7'; Kanouté 47'; Alexis 49'	(Report)		Stadium: Ramón Sánchez Pizjuán Stadium; Attendance: 30,000; Referee: Miguel Ángel Pérez Lasa

19 January 2011	Deportivo La Coruña	2–3 (2–4 agg.)	Almería	A Coruña
20:00 CET	Álvarez 43' (pen.); Adrián 51'	(Report)	Corona 19'; Crusat 20'; Goitom 55' (pen.)	Stadium: Estadio Riazor; Attendance: 8,000; Referee: Eduardo Iturralde González

19 January 2011	Betis	3–1 (3–6 agg.)	Barcelona	Seville
22:00 CET	Molina 2', 7'; Arzu 45+1'	(Report)	Messi 36'	Stadium: Estadio Benito Villamarín; Attendance: 35,000; Referee: Carlos Clos Gomez

20 January 2011	Atlético Madrid	0–1 (1–4 agg.)	Real Madrid	Madrid
22:00 CET		(Report)	Ronaldo 23'	Stadium: Estadio Vicente Calderón; Attendance: 52,000; Referee: Javier Turienzo Álvarez

== Semi-finals ==
The first leg matches were played on 26 January while the second legs were played on 2 February 2011.

Team 1	Agg.	Team 2	1st leg	2nd leg
Barcelona	8–0	Almería	5–0	3–0
Sevilla	0–3	Real Madrid	0–1	0–2

=== First leg ===
26 January 2011	Sevilla	0–1	Real Madrid	Seville
20:00 CET		(Report)	Benzema 17'	Stadium: Ramón Sánchez Pizjuán Stadium; Attendance: 45,000; Referee: Alberto Undiano Mallenco

26 January 2011	Barcelona	5–0	Almería	Barcelona
22:00 CET	Messi 9', 15'; Villa 10'; Pedro 30'; Keita 87'	(Report)		Stadium: Camp Nou; Attendance: 49,875; Referee: Antonio Mateu Lahoz

=== Second leg ===
2 February 2011	Almería	0–3 (0–8 agg.)	Barcelona	Almería
20:00 CET		(Report)	Adriano 35'; Thiago 56'; Afellay 66'	Stadium: Estadio de los Juegos Mediterráneos; Attendance: 12,000; Referee: Miguel Ángel Ayza Gámez

2 February 2011	Real Madrid	2–0 (3–0 agg.)	Sevilla	Madrid
22:00 CET	Özil 82'; Adebayor 90+3'	(Report)		Stadium: Estadio Santiago Bernabéu; Attendance: 75,100; Referee: Fernando Teixeira Vitienes

== Final ==
20 April 2011
21:30 CEST

Barcelona	0–1 (a.e.t.)	Real Madrid
	Report (in Spanish)	Ronaldo 103'

Mestalla, Valencia
Attendance: 55,000
Referee: Alberto Undiano Mallenco (Navarre)

Copa del Rey
2010–11 Winners
Real Madrid
18th Title

== Top goalscorers ==
Rank	Player	Club	Goals
1	(Argentina) Lionel Messi	Barcelona	7
1	(Portugal) Cristiano Ronaldo	Real Madrid	7
3	(Argentina) Leonardo Ulloa	Almería	6
4	(France) Karim Benzema	Real Madrid	5
4	(Spain) Álvaro Negredo	Sevilla	5
6	(Argentina) Fernando Cavenaghi	Mallorca	4
6	(Spain) Adrián	Deportivo La Coruña	4
6	(Spain) Jorge Molina	Betis	4
6	(Spain) Pedro	Barcelona	4
10	8 players		3
