= 2010–11 FC Barcelona season =

112th season in existence of FC Barcelona

Barcelona
2010–11 season
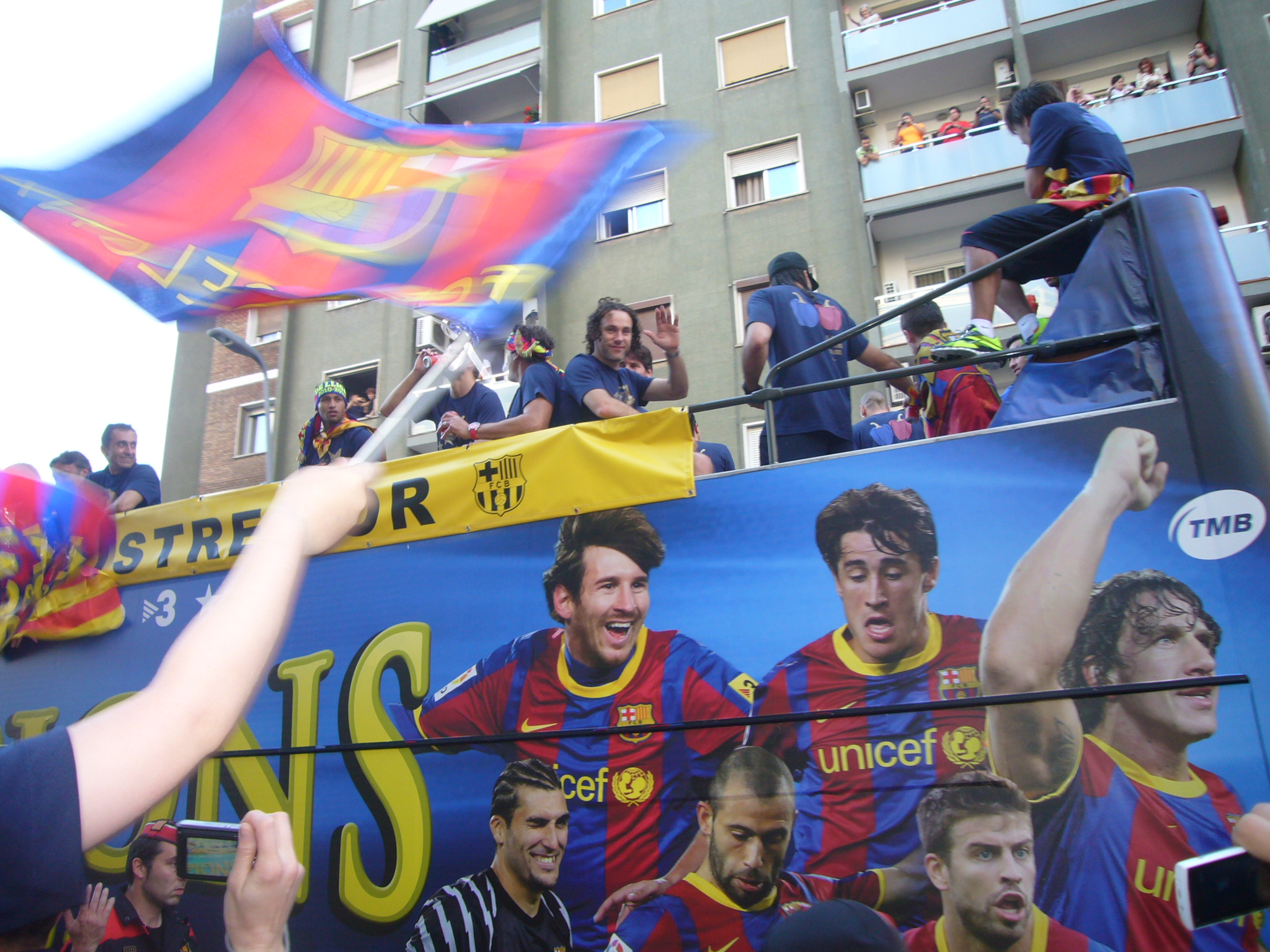
- FC Barcelona players celebrating their 2010–11 La Liga title win, 14 May 2011
- President: Sandro Rosell
- Head coach: Pep Guardiola
- Stadium: Camp Nou
- La Liga: 1st
- Copa del Rey: Runners-up
- Supercopa de España: Winners
- UEFA Champions League: Winners
- Top goalscorer: League: Lionel Messi (31); All: Lionel Messi (53)
- Highest home attendance: 98,255 vs Real Madrid (29 November 2010)
- Lowest home attendance: 38,971 vs Ceuta (10 November 2010)
- Average home league attendance: 78,614
Home colours	Away colours	Third colours

The 2010–11 season was FC Barcelona's 112th in existence and the club's 80th consecutive season in the top flight of Spanish football. Barcelona started the season with a new president after Joan Laporta reached his term limit on 30 June, leaving behind a very successful club tenure.

Sandro Rosell was elected president on 13 June by securing a record total of 35,021 votes (61.35%), more than the 27,138 achieved by Laporta in 2003. Rosell began his tenure on 1 July as the 39th president in Barcelona's history.

This team, being described by commentators and former players, is widely considered to be one of the greatest club sides of all time. Former Manchester United manager Sir Alex Ferguson has described this squad as the best he had ever faced.

== Season overview ==
=== June ===
Barcelona started their transfer window only three days after the end of the 2009–10 season, by reaching an agreement with Valencia for Spanish international David Villa worth €40 million.

On 30 June, Xavier Sala-i-Martin, treasurer and director in charge of the economic area, announced that Barcelona earned a record €445.5 million in revenue during the 2009–10 season. According to Xavier, "that's the highest revenues achieved by any club, in any sport including the U.S." This means FC Barcelona is the richest club in the world in terms of revenue.

Coach Pep Guardiola later expressed disapproval of the transfer of Ukrainian centre-back Dmytro Chyhrynskyi, indicating he was pressed to let him go. Speaking at a press-conference, Guardiola said, "My opinion counts, but the needs of the club go above that and that's why he was sold, I would like to have kept him." Speaking on the departing Yaya Touré, Guardiola said he would have preferred him to stay, but the player was set on moving.

On 14 July, Thierry Henry and Barcelona agreed to rescind his contract in order for Henry to become a free agent, where he subsequently signed a new four-and-a-half-year contract with Major League Soccer's New York Red Bulls. He stated, "This is a new and exciting chapter in my career." The club also agreed with Pep Guardiola on a one-year extension to stay as coach of the first team, along with long-time assistant Tito Vilanova.

=== August ===
On 27 August, Barcelona reached an agreement with English club Liverpool for the services of Argentine international Javier Mascherano. The deal was worth €24 million and was reached "after considerable effort from the club [Barcelona] over the last few hours and the willingness and desire of the player to make the move". On the same day, Barcelona's executive committee of the board of directors publicly "denounced the conduct over the last few days of the agent of our player Zlatan Ibrahimović, Mino Raiola, whose declarations have put into question the honour and moral integrity of our coach Pep Guardiola". The club's legal department considered the possibility of rescinding the contract and the cessation of the annual payment Raiola's company receives from the club as part of their agreement. The next day, Barcelona and Italian club Milan agreed to a one-year loan for the Swedish international, with Milan paying all his earnings for the 2010–11 season and including in the agreement the option for Milan to make the move permanent next summer for a fee of €24 million.

=== September ===
Coach Guardiola stated, "It will cost us a lot. We expect a difficult year in which things have to be won by ourselves. Right now, the team is not at full strength at this point in the season."

On 19 September, Lionel Messi suffered an ankle injury due to an ill-advised tackle by Atlético Madrid defender Tomáš Ujfaluši in the 92nd minute of their Round Three match at the Vicente Calderón Stadium. At first sight, it was feared that Messi suffered a broken ankle that could have kept the star player away from the pitch for a minimum of six months, but MRIs performed the next day in Barcelona showed he suffered a sprain in the internal and external ligaments of his right ankle. Teammate David Villa stated "the tackle on Messi was brutal" after watching the video of the play and also added that he believed the Atlético defender "didn't go into the tackle to hurt". The incident caused widespread media attention because of Messi's high profile in the football world and brought up the debate of equality in protecting all players in the game. Debates whether the fact that Messi's status prompted the intensive media and fans scrutiny of Ujfaluši and subsequent two match ban by the Competition Committee appeared all over the internet, television, and print in the days following the incident.

=== October ===
Due to the findings of the audit, Barcelona compromisarios (commissioners) voted to enforce the social action of responsibility against the club's previous board with 468 in favour, 439 against and 113 abstaining. Ex-president Laporta's board will be called upon to respond in court due to €48.7 million that went missing during his presidency.

On 18 October, Laporta defended his presidency in front of the media by stating that, "We just want them to give us the documentation regarding the biased and demagogic statement made by the representative of KPMG." He also stated, "The board has not had the courage to explain things", and, "We have nothing to hide, everything has its explanation and justification." Laporta did not hold back and branded the new president "envious, resentful and jealous" and "I have a very clear conscience and the truth on my side". He continue to berate the new board by stating, "My greatest desire after spending a few years of my life at Barça and the results we got was to become a socio, go back to my seat, go to football games with my kids and enjoy this club. They do not let me. Ad not only do they not let me, but I see some attempts to ridicule, dishonor the reputation we have. No way I'm left alone. After the assembly of delegates, I understand that there was an indecent maneuver with the exposure of the 'due diligence'... It was sectarian, demagogic and an interest to scorn against me and create an alarm among the social mass."

=== November ===
On 29 November, one of the most eagerly-awaited Clásico in recent times was scheduled on a Monday due to the elections to the Parliament of Catalonia, which was held on the day before. The match featured 13 of the 23 winning players on Spain's 2010 FIFA World Cup squad and currently the two most successful managers in football, with Pep Guardiola and Real Madrid's José Mourinho. The match itself was a complete domination by Barcelona, with an emphatic 5–0 trashing of their eternal rival. The game showcased Barça's mastering of the tiki-taka in combination with the Total Football philosophy and the superb team-work of whom many consider the top three players in the world: Messi, Xavi and Andrés Iniesta. The international press hailed Barcelona's impressive win and their football as currently the best in the game, while some questioned whether the Real Madrid squad was "ready" for the magnitude of this match.

Guardiola stated, "it was a spectacle" and "how we did it – that makes us proud. Now just let us sit back and enjoy that win – we'll reflect and look at the whole game, but now it would be wrong not to revel in the win. Games like that happen very rarely indeed". In regards to Madrid, Pep stated, "This match isn't representative of the difference between the two teams. They are a very good team, they came here unbeaten and as league leaders. Today all of our players played well and that was the difference."

After the victory, Barcelona took over first place in La Liga's table, ahead of Madrid by two points with 25 rounds left to play.

=== December ===
On 6 December, the finalists for the FIFA Ballon d'Or were announced. Barcelona players (Messi, Xavi and Iniesta) took all three spots, with the results to be declared on 10 January in Zürich. This was a monumental moment for Barcelona, as the three best players in the world were not only from the club, but all three came from Barcelona's youth system at La Masia.

On 13 December, president Rosell made final the signing of a five-and-a-half-year, €170 million shirt sponsorship with the Qatar Foundation, thus ending Barça's tradition of not having paid sponsors on their shirt. The deal made it the highest paid shirt sponsorship in the world, beating both Manchester United's deal with Aon and Liverpool's deal with Standard Chartered reached the prior year.

=== January ===
On 10 January, Lionel Messi was crowned the 2010 FIFA Ballon d'Or winner. His teammates Andrés Iniesta and Xavi finished second and third respectively. Messi became the first player to win the new prize after the FIFA World Player of the Year and Ballon d'Or merged to become the FIFA Ballon d'Or. He also became the first player since Marco van Basten to win the Ballon d'Or and Ronaldinho the FIFA World Player of the Year in consecutive years after an impressive year in which he tallied 60 goals in 64 games.

On 19 January, Barça's team record of 28 matches unbeaten was ended after being defeated 3–1 by Real Betis of the Segunda División in the second leg of their quarter-finals tie of the Copa del Rey. Barcelona, however, advanced to the semi-finals on a 6–3 aggregate score after winning the first leg at the Camp Nou 5–0.

On 29 January, Barça defeated Hércules 0–3 to match the record for most consecutive league wins in a La Liga season, at 15. The record was previously set by Real Madrid during the 1960–61 season.

=== February ===
On 2 February, both Barcelona and Real Madrid advanced to the Final of the Copa del Rey by defeating Almería (8–0 on aggregate) and Sevilla (0–3 on aggregate), respectively. This was the first final between the Spanish giants after 21 years in the making when the clubs last faced in 1990 with Barça winning 2–0 at the Mestalla Stadium in Valencia.

On 5 February, Barcelona broke the record for most consecutive league wins with 16 victories after they defeated Atlético Madrid 3–0 at Camp Nou. Lionel Messi scored a hat-trick to ensure the victory for his side and after the match stated, "It's an honor to be able to pass a record set by a great like Di Stéfano" and, "If the record has been around for so long is because it's very complicated to achieve and we have reached it by defeating a very difficult team who's going through a bad situation, which makes it even more difficult."

=== March ===
On 2 March, Adriano assisted Lionel Messi to score a late goal and give Barcelona a 0–1 away win against Valencia. Messi now tallied 27 goals in La Liga for the season, keeping him in the running for the Pichichi Trophy as top scorer.

On 8 March, Barça eliminated Arsenal from the Champions League in a 3–1 win at the Camp Nou with a 4–3 aggregate score. Barcelona dominated all offensive categories and limited Arsenal to zero shots for the whole match, with their lone goal coming off an own goal by Sergio Busquets. But the match was not without controversy after Arsenal forward Robin van Persie was sent off for a second yellow card for what referee Massimo Busacca interpreted as "time wasting" after the player kicked the ball towards goal after the referee had blown the whistle on him for being called offside by the linesman.

On 14 March, Spanish radio station Cadena COPE reported that Real Madrid would request for the Royal Spanish Football Federation (RFEF) to tighten its control on doping in the league. According to the report, Real Madrid was suspicious to why Eufemiano Fuentes was allowed to work for Valencia when they won the league in the early 2000s and why are doctors with "doubtful reputation" are working at Barcelona. Barcelona, in defence, released a statement "publicly expressing its total indignation at these unfounded references which link the club to doping practices and to condemn such attitudes, which have nothing to do with fair play and gravely affect the image of sporting competition". It also stated "its legal department is studying possible legal action to defend the club's honour, alongside that of its coaching staff, players and medical staff and is prepared to take such action to its final consequences". COPE later issued an apology, stating, "our objective is to inform. In no case, did we participate in a campaign to defame or bring doubts to Spanish clubs or athletes."

On 15 March, Barcelona's secretary and spokesperson Toni Freixa appeared in a press conference to make public that Barcelona would sue Cadena COPE after the reports implicating Barcelona in doping. He stated that "yesterday [14 March], FC Barcelona released a statement and, paralleled, sent a fax to Cadena COPE requesting the rectification and the origin of the grave report of defamation. The rest of the day it waited for the express and convincing rectification of the report." He also added, "since this correction has not occurred satisfactorily and whether they can finally be produced, for the serious attack on the reputation and good name of FC Barcelona, for their athletes and doctors, a fact that we cannot leave unpunished, FC Barcelona announced to act with firmness and force that the gravity of the offense deserves. In the coming days it will request at first instance with the Barcelona's courts an order of protection of their right to honor claims for damages caused by those responsible for defamation."

On the same day, Barcelona announced that French international defender Eric Abidal was diagnosed with a tumour on his liver which would be operated on the Friday of the same week. Citing privacy concerns as wished by the player, the club did not release additional information in regards to his condition. In response to the announcement, players and fans from all over the world alike dedicated well wishes for the ill player on multiple social networking sites and sports websites. Before their Round of 16 match in the Champions League, both Real Madrid and Lyon players exited the pitch wearing "Ánimo Abidal" ("Strength Abidal") written on T-shirts, along with the same message on the Santiago Bernabéu Stadium's scoreboards in show of support and solidarity.

=== April ===
On 2 April, Barcelona defeated Villarreal 1–0 at El Madrigal with five missing starters due to injuries and rest with a goal in the 66th minute from centre back Gerard Piqué. With the victory, they increased their league lead to eight points after Real Madrid's 1–0 shock loss to Sporting de Gijón at the Santiago Bernabéu.

On 12 April, Barcelona defeated Shakhtar Donetsk 0–1 at the Donbass Arena in Donetsk to reach their fourth consecutive semi-finals appearance in the Champions League with a 6–1 aggregate score. Lionel Messi assured the victory with a goal in the 43rd minute to take his season tally to 48 goals in all competitions, breaking the club's mark of 47 goals set by himself last season and Ronaldo in the 1996–97 season.

On 16 April, the first of four Clásicos was disputed at the Santiago Bernabéu, ending in 1–1 with penalty goals respectively by Messi (53rd minute) and Cristiano Ronaldo (82nd minute). The draw ended Barcelona's Clásico winning streak at five since manager Pep Guardiola took over the side for the 2008–09 season. The match was the start of four Clásicos between the two Spanish giants, including the league, Copa del Rey Final and the semi-finals of the Champions League.

On 20 April, Barcelona lost the final of the Copa del Rey to Real Madrid 0–1 after extra time, with Cristiano Ronaldo scoring the winning goal in the 103rd minute. The defeat was a first for Guardiola in a finals match and ended his unbeaten streak against Real Madrid since he became first team coach.

On 27 April, Barcelona and Real Madrid met at the Santiago Bernabéu in Madrid for the first leg of their Champions League semi-final tie. Although Barcelona enjoyed most of the possession throughout the first half of the game, it was not until the sending off of Real Madrid's Pepe that the game swung to Barcelona's favour, with Lionel Messi scoring twice in the closing minutes to give Barcelona a 2−0 first-leg victory. With those two goals, Lionel Messi had scored 11 goals in 11 Champions League matches.

The match was not without controversy, however, as both teams exhibited what most consider to be the "dark arts" of football. Real Madrid manager José Mourinho accused UEFA of playing favorites to Barcelona after he was ejected for mocking the fourth official after Pepe's red card. At the press conference following the match, Mourinho stated that UEFA's referees have been assisting Barcelona for the past three years. Barcelona's back-up goalkeeper José Manuel Pinto saw a red card at half-time for a scuffle with Real Madrid's defender Álvaro Arbeloa when both teams went to the locker rooms. The match was marred by more incidents of diving, play-acting and violence in what many consider to be one of the worst Clásicos in recent times.

UEFA officials released a statement stating they have opened disciplinary cases against the clubs to be heard by the UEFA Control and Disciplinary Body on Friday 6 May.

On 30 April, Barcelona's 32-games unbeaten run came to an end after a 2–1 loss to Real Sociedad at Anoeta Stadium.

=== May ===
On 3 May, Barcelona booked a trip to Wembley Stadium for the UEFA Champions League Final after a 1–1 draw (3–1 aggregate) with Real Madrid at Camp Nou. Pedro sealed it with a 54th-minute goal.

On 11 May, Barcelona clinched its third consecutive La Liga title with a 1–1 draw against Levante at the Estadi Ciutat de València. A goal scored by Seydou Keita in the 27th minute insured the title for the Blaugrana. The result gave Barcelona a six-point lead with two matches remaining which, combined with their superior head-to-head record with Real Madrid, ensured that they finished top of the table. Barcelona led the table since defeating Madrid 5–0 back in November and since then, they have only lost one match en route to winning the title. It was the third straight title for manager Guardiola, who became the first manager to do so in his first three seasons managing in La Liga.

On 21 May, Barcelona finish its league season with a win 1–3 over Málaga at La Rosaleda Stadium while playing most of its back-up and canterano players. Goals from Bojan, Ibrahim Afellay and Marc Bartra assured the victory and a club record of 14 away victories.

On 28 May, Barcelona clinched its fourth Champions League trophy with a 3–1 victory over Manchester United at Wembley Stadium. The Barcelona attack, spearheaded by its three forwards of Messi, David Villa and Pedro, of whom all scored a goal, dominated United. The all-Spanish midfield three of Xavi, Iniesta and Busquets assisted a goal each as well. Messi was awarded Man of the Match and with his goal he matches Ruud van Nistelrooy as the all-time top season scorer with 12 goals in this year's version.

== Players ==
=== Squad information ===
N	Pos.	Nat.	Name	Age	EU	Since	App	Goals	Ends	Transfer fee	Notes
1	GK	(Spain)	Víctor Valdés (VC)	29	EU	2002	406	0	2014	Youth system	
2	RB	(Brazil)	Dani Alves	28	EU	2008	153	12	2015	€32M	Second nationality: Spain
3	CB	(Spain)	Gerard Piqué	24	EU	2008	144	11	2015	€5M	Originally from Youth system
5	CB	(Spain)	Carles Puyol (captain)	33	EU	1999	514	9	2013	Youth system	
6	CM	(Spain)	Xavi (VC)	31	EU	1998	576	58	2016	Youth system	
7	FW	(Spain)	David Villa	29	EU	2010	51	22	2015	€40M	
8	CM	(Spain)	Andrés Iniesta (VC)	27	EU	2002	360	33	2015	Youth system	
9	FW	(Spain)	Bojan	20	EU	2007	161	40	2015	Youth system	
10	FW	(Argentina)	Lionel Messi	23	EU	2004	268	179	2016	Youth system	Second nationality: Spain
11	RW	(Venezuela)	Jeffrén	23	EU	2008	32	3	2012	Youth system	Second nationality: Spain
13	GK	(Spain)	José Manuel Pinto	35	EU	2008	33	0	2012	€0.5M	
14	DM	(Argentina)	Javier Mascherano	26	EU	2010	42	0	2014	€19M	Second nationality: Italy
15	CM	(Mali)	Seydou Keita	31	EU	2008	142	18	2014	€14M	Second nationality: France
16	DM	(Spain)	Sergio Busquets	22	EU	2008	138	5	2015	Youth system	
17	FW	(Spain)	Pedro	23	EU	2008	119	44	2015	Youth system	
18	CB	(Argentina)	Gabriel Milito	30	EU	2007	75	2	2012	€18M	Second nationality: Italy
19	LB	(Brazil)	Maxwell	29	Non-EU	2009	75	1	2014	€4.5M	
20	MF	(Netherlands)	Ibrahim Afellay	25	EU	2010	24	1	2015	€3M	Second nationality: Morocco
21	FB	(Brazil)	Adriano	26	Non-EU	2010	30	1	2014	€9.5M	
22	LB	(France)	Eric Abidal	31	EU	2007	137	1	2014	€9M	

- Last updated: 28 May 2011
- Source: FCBarcelona.cat, Players in / out, Wikipedia players' articles, ESPN (for appearances and goals) and footballdatabase.com (for EU passport)
- Ordered by Last season starting 11 and position on pitch (from back right to front left).

Total squad cost: €154.5 million

=== From youth system ===
As of 1 September 2010.

Note: Flags indicate national team as defined under FIFA eligibility rules; some limited exceptions apply. Players may hold more than one non-FIFA nationality.

No.	Pos.	Nation	Player
26	DF	ESP	Andreu Fontàs
27	FW	ESP	Nolito
28	MF	ESP	Sergi Roberto
29	MF	ESP	Víctor Vázquez
30	MF	ESP	Thiago
31	GK	ESP	Rubén Miño
32	DF	ESP	Marc Bartra

No.	Pos.	Nation	Player
33	DF	ESP	Sergi Gómez
34	MF	MEX	Jonathan dos Santos
35	DF	ESP	Marc Muniesa
37	MF	ESP	Oriol Romeu
38	GK	ESP	Oier
40	DF	ESP	Martín Montoya
41	FW	ESP	Gerard Deulofeu

=== Players in / out ===
==== In ====
No.	Pos.	Nat.	Name	Age	EU	Moving from	Type	Transfer window	Ends	Transfer fee	Source
	DF	(Uruguay)	Martín Cáceres	23	Non-EU	Juventus (Italy)	Return of loan	Summer	2012	Free	
	MF	(Belarus)	Alexander Hleb	29	Non-EU	VfB Stuttgart (Germany)	Return of loan	Summer	2012	Free	
	MF	(Spain)	Víctor Sánchez	23	EU	Xerez	Return of loan	Summer	undisclosed	Free	
	FW	(Brazil)	Keirrison	21	Non-EU	Fiorentina (Italy)	Return of loan	Summer	2014	Free	
	DF	(Brazil)	Henrique	24	Non-EU	Racing Santander	Return of loan	Summer	2013	Free	
7	FW	(Spain)	David Villa	28	EU	Valencia	Transfer	Summer	2014	€40M	FCBarcelona.cat
14	MF	(Argentina)	Javier Mascherano	26	EU	Liverpool (England)	Transfer	Summer	2014	€19M	FCBarcelona.cat
21	DF	(Brazil)	Adriano	26	EU	Sevilla	Transfer	Summer	2014	€9.5M	FCBarcelona.cat
20	MF	(Netherlands)	Ibrahim Afellay	24	EU	PSV (Netherlands)	Transfer	Winter	2015	€3M	FCBarcelona.cat
11	LW	(Venezuela)	Jeffrén	23	EU	Barcelona B	Promoted	Summer	2014	Free	

Total spending: ▼€71.5 million

==== Out ====
No.	Pos.	Nat.	Name	Age	EU	Moving to	Type	Transfer window	Transfer fee	Source
4	DF	(Mexico)	Rafael Márquez	31	EU	New York Red Bulls (United States)	Contract Termination	Summer	Free	FCBarcelona.cat
14	FW	(France)	Thierry Henry	33	EU	New York Red Bulls (United States)	Contract Termination	Summer	Free	FCBarcelona.cat
21	DF	(Ukraine)	Dmytro Chyhrynskyi	24	Non-EU	Shakhtar Donetsk (Ukraine)	Transfer	Summer	€15M	FCBarcelona.cat
24	MF	(Ivory Coast)	Touré Yaya	27	Non-EU	Manchester City (England)	Transfer	Summer	€28.5M	FCBarcelona.cat
9	FW	(Sweden)	Zlatan Ibrahimović	29	EU	Milan (Italy)	Transfer	Summer	€24M	FCBarcelona.cat
—	FW	(Brazil)	Keirrison	21	Non-EU	Santos (Brazil)	Loan	Summer	N/A	FCBarcelona.cat
—	DF	(Brazil)	Henrique	24	Non-EU	Racing Santander	Loan	Summer	N/A	FCBarcelona.cat
—	MF	(Spain)	Víctor Sánchez	23	EU	Getafe	Loan	Summer	N/A	FCBarcelona.cat
—	DF	(Uruguay)	Martín Cáceres	23	Non-EU	Sevilla	Loan	Summer	N/A	FCBarcelona.cat
—	MF	(Belarus)	Alexander Hleb	29	EU	Birmingham City (England)	Loan	Summer	N/A	FCBarcelona.cat

Total income: ▲€67.5 million.

Expenditure: ▼€4 million.

== Player statistics ==
=== Team stats ===
	La Liga	Champions League	Copa del Rey	Total Stats
Games played	38	13	9	60
Games won	30	9	5	44
Games drawn	6	3	2	11
Games lost	2	1	2	5
Goals for	95	30	22	147
Goals against	21	9	6	36
Shots	588	198	135	921
Corners for	254	59	67	380
Corners against	137	24	30	191
Players used	28	26	25	29
Offsides	148	46	30	224
Fouls received	537	204	138	879
Fouls committed	390	132	87	609
Yellow cards	73	12	10	95
Red cards	2	1	0	3

Last updated: 25 May 2011
Source: Competitive matches

=== Squad stats ===
				Total				UEFA Champions League		La Liga		Copa del Rey		Others^{1}		
N	Pos.	Name	Nat.	GS	App	Gls	Min	App	Gls	App	Gls	App	Gls	App	Gls	Notes
1	GK	V. Valdés	(Spain)	44	44		4039	11		32				1		
13	GK	Pinto	(Spain)	17	17		1609	2		6		9				
31	GK	Miño	(Spain)	1	1		90							1		
2	DF	Dani Alves	(Brazil)	50	54	4	4744	12	2	35	2	5		2		
3	DF	Piqué	(Spain)	48	51	4	4456	12	1	31	3	7		1		
5	DF	Puyol	(Spain)	25	27	1	2199	8		17	1	2				
18	DF	Milito	(Argentina)	12	17	1	1028	2		10		4	1	1		Source
19	DF	Maxwell	(Brazil)	31	41	1	2993	7		25		7	1	2		
21	DF	Adriano	(Brazil)	23	31	1	2098	6		15		8	1	2		
22	DF	Abidal	(France)	34	41	1	3136	8		26		5	1	2		
26	DF	Fontàs	(Spain)	7	8	1	657	1	1	6		1				
32	DF	Bartra	(Spain)	4	5	1	235	1		2	1	2				
33	DF	S. Gómez	(Spain)	1	1		90							1		
40	DF	Montoya	(Spain)	1	2		22			2						Source
6	MF	Xavi	(Spain)	47	50	5	4070	12	2	31	3	6		1		
8	MF	A. Iniesta	(Spain)	46	50	9	4197	10	1	34	8	5		1		
14	MF	Mascherano	(Argentina)	35	45		3094	11		27		7				
15	MF	Keita	(Mali)	27	56	6	2831	10	1	35	3	9	2	2		
16	MF	Sergio	(Spain)	42	46	1	3883	12		28	1	5		1		
20	MF	Afellay	(Netherlands)	10	29	2	1053	7		16	1	6	1			
28	MF	S. Roberto	(Spain)	1	3		27	1		1		1				
29	MF	V. Vázquez	(Spain)		1	1	77	1	1							
30	MF	Thiago	(Spain)	10	17	3	730	1		12	2	3	1	1		
34	MF	Jonathan	(Mexico)	3	5		135	1		2		1		1		
37	MF	Romeu	(Spain)	1	2		90			1				1		
7	FW	David Villa	(Spain)	48	52	23	4119	12	4	34	18	5	1	1		
9	FW	Bojan	(Spain)	17	37	7	1630	3		27	6	5	1	2		
10	FW	Messi	(Argentina)	48	55	53	4675	13	12	33	31	7	7	2	3	
11	FW	Jeffrén	(Venezuela)	6	13	1	394	2		8	1	3				
17	FW	Pedro	(Spain)	40	53	22	3632	12	5	33	13	7	4	1		
27	FW	Nolito	(Spain)	2	5	1	159			2		3	1			

Last updated: 12 Aug
Ordered by
0 shown as blank
^{1} Other Competitions: Supercopa de España, UEFA Super Cup, FIFA Club World Cup

=== Disciplinary records ===
No.	Pos.	Nat.	Player
1	GK	(Spain)	V. Valdés	0	0	0
13	GK	(Spain)	Pinto	0	0	1
2	DF	(Brazil)	Dani Alves	0	0	0
3	DF	(Spain)	Piqué	0	0	0
5	DF	(Spain)	Puyol	0	0	0
24	DF	(Spain)	Fontàs	0	0	0
19	DF	(Brazil)	Maxwell	2	0	0
21	DF	(Brazil)	Adriano	5	0	0
22	DF	(France)	Abidal	3	0	0
32	DF	(Spain)	Bartra	1	0	0
6	MF	(Spain)	Xavi	6	0	0
8	MF	(Spain)	A. Iniesta	4	0	0
14	MF	(Argentina)	Mascherano	7	0	0
15	MF	(Mali)	Keita	2	0	0
16	MF	(Spain)	Sergio	9	0	0
20	MF	(Netherlands)	Afellay	1	0	0
30	MF	(Spain)	Thiago	1	0	0
7	FW	(Spain)	David Villa	3	0	1
9	FW	(Spain)	Bojan	2	0	0
11	FW	(Venezuela)	Jeffrén	0	0	0
17	FW	(Spain)	Pedro	4	0	0

Last updated on 28 May.

== Club ==
=== Technical staff ===
Position	Staff
Head coach	(Spain) Pep Guardiola
Assistant coach	(Spain) Tito Vilanova
Goalkeeping coach	(Spain) Carles Busquets
Physical fitness coach	(Spain) Lorenzo Buenaventura
Director of Football	(Spain) Andoni Zubizarreta

Last updated: 2 July
Source: FC Barcelona Official Website

== Pre-season and friendlies ==
29 July 2010 Summer Tour	Vålerenga	2–4	Barcelona	Oslo, Norway
19:00 CEST	Singh 15' (pen.); Zajić 65'	Report	Sánchez 13'; Maxwell 35'; Benja 51'; Keita 64'	Stadium: Ullevaal Stadion; Attendance: 21,993; Referee: Terje Hauge (Norway)

4 August 2010 Asian Tour	K-League All-Stars	2–5	Barcelona	Seoul, South Korea
12:00 CEST (UTC+02:00)	Choi Sung-kuk 1'; Lee Dong-gook 36'; Molina (yellow card) 42'	Report	Ibrahimović 6'; Messi 43', 45+2'; Sánchez 82'; Soriano 84'	Stadium: Seoul World Cup Stadium; Attendance: 32,581; Referee: Choi Kwang-Bo (South Korea)

8 August 2010 Asian Tour	Beijing Guoan	0–3	Barcelona	Beijing, China
13:00 CEST (UTC+02:00)		Report	Roberto 11'; Nolito 13'; Ibrahimović (yellow card) 85', (goal) 90'	Stadium: Beijing National Stadium; Attendance: 44,000; Referee: Wang Zhe (China)

25 August 2010 Joan Gamper Trophy	Barcelona	1–1 (3–1 p)	Milan	Barcelona, Spain
19:45 CEST (UTC+02:00)	Villa 48'; Milito (yellow card) 61'	Report	Inzaghi 67'	Stadium: Camp Nou; Attendance: 96,195; Referee: David Fernández Borbalán (Andalusia)
	Penalties
	Messi (penalty scored); Busquets (penalty missed); Bojan (penalty scored); Thiago (penalty scored)		(penalty missed) Seedorf; (penalty missed) Pirlo; (penalty scored) Yepes; (penalty missed) Jankulovski

GAMES 2010–2011
01-12-2010 Copa Catalunya (final, 3x1). BARCELONA-ESPANYOL 1–2

01-12-2010 Copa Catalunya (final, 3x1). BARCELONA-L'HOSPITALET 2–0

== Competitions ==
=== Overall ===
Barcelona was present in all major competitions: La Liga, the UEFA Champions League and the Copa del Rey.

Competition	Started round	Final position / round	First match	Last match
La Liga	—	1st	29 August 2010	21 May 2011
Supercopa de España	Final	Winner	14 August 2010	21 August 2010
Copa del Rey	Round of 32	Runner Up	27 October 2010	20 April 2011
UEFA Champions League	Group stage	Winner	14 September 2010	28 May 2011

Source: Competitions

=== Supercopa de España ===
14 August 2010 First leg	Sevilla	3–1	Barcelona	Seville
21:30 CEST	Zokora (yellow card) 57'; Luís Fabiano 61'; Dabo (yellow card) 67'; Cigarini (yellow card) 72'; Kanouté 72', 82'	Report	Ibrahimović 20'; Dani Alves (yellow card) 89'	Stadium: Ramón Sánchez Pizjuán; Attendance: 40,000; Referee: César Muñiz Fernández (Asturias)

21 August 2010 Second leg	Barcelona	4–0 (5–3 agg.)	Sevilla	Barcelona
20:30 CEST	Konko 14' (o.g.); Messi 25', 44', 90+1'; Piqué (yellow card) 80'	Report	Romaric (yellow card) 34'; Cigarini (yellow card) 90'	Stadium: Camp Nou; Attendance: 67,414; Referee: Fernando Teixeira Vitienes (Cantabria)

=== La Liga ===
==== League table ====
Pos	Team	Pld	W	D	L	GF	GA	GD	Pts	Qualification or relegation
1	Barcelona (C)	38	30	6	2	95	21	+74	96	Qualification for the Champions League group stage
2	Real Madrid	38	29	5	4	102	33	+69	92	Qualification for the Champions League group stage
3	Valencia	38	21	8	9	64	44	+20	71	Qualification for the Champions League group stage
4	Villarreal	38	18	8	12	54	44	+10	62	Qualification for the Champions League play-off round
5	Sevilla	38	17	7	14	62	61	+1	58 (Note: SEV: 7 pts; ATH: 6 pts; ATM: 4 pts)	Qualification for the Europa League play-off round

Source: LFP, sportec.es, Yahoo! Sport
Rules for classification: 1st points; 2nd head-to-head points; 3rd head-to-head goal difference; 4th head-to-head goals scored; 5th goal difference; 6th number of goals scored; 7th Fair-play points
(C) Champions

==== Results summary ====
Overall								Home						Away					
Pld	W	D	L	GF	GA	GD	Pts	W	D	L	GF	GA	GD	W	D	L	GF	GA	GD
38	30	6	2	95	21	+74	96	16	2	1	46	10	+36	14	4	1	49	11	+38

Last updated: 21 May 2011.
Source: Competitive matches

==== Results by round ====
Round	1	2	3	4	5	6	7	8	9	10	11	12	13	14	15	16	17	18	19	20	21	22	23	24	25	26	27	28	29	30	31	32	33	34	35	36	37	38
Ground	A	H	A	H	A	H	H	A	H	A	H	A	H	A	H	A	H	A	H	H	A	H	A	H	A	A	H	A	H	A	H	A	H	A	H	A	H	A
Result	W	L	W	W	W	D	W	W	W	W	W	W	W	W	W	W	W	W	W	W	W	W	D	W	W	W	W	D	W	W	W	D	W	L	W	D	D	W
Position	3	8	6	4	3	4	3	3	2	2	2	2	1	1	1	1	1	1	1	1	1	1	1	1	1	1	1	1	1	1	1	1	1	1	1	1	1	1

Updated to match(es) played on 21 May 2011. Source: Competitive matches
A = Away; H = Home; W = Win; D = Draw; L = Loss

==== Matches ====
29 August 2010 1	Racing Santander	0–3	Barcelona	Santander
19:00 CEST (UTC+02:00)	Francis (yellow card) 30'; Diop (yellow card) 60'; Cisma (yellow card) 68'; Munitis (yellow card) 82'	(Report); Live TV:	Messi 3'; Iniesta 33'; Villa 62'; Piqué (yellow card) 90+1'	Stadium: El Sardinero; Attendance: 19,095; Referee: Carlos Delgado Ferreiro (Basque Country)

11 September 2010 2	Barcelona	0–2	Hércules	Barcelona
18:00 CEST (UTC+02:00)	Mascherano (yellow card) 19'; Adriano (yellow card) 42'	(Report); Live TV:	Valdez 27', 59'; Trezeguet (yellow card) 42'; Drenthe (yellow card) 44'	Stadium: Camp Nou; Attendance: 79,363; Referee: Carlos Velasco Carballo (Community of Madrid)

19 September 2010 3	Atlético Madrid	1–2	Barcelona	Madrid
19:00 CEST (UTC+02:00)	Domínguez (yellow card) 17'; García 25'; Perea (yellow card) 37'; Ujfaluši (yellow card) 52' (red card) 90+2'; Assunção (yellow card) 87'	(Report); Live TV:	Messi 13'; Dani Alves (yellow card) 31'; Piqué 33'; Maxwell (yellow card) 36'; Valdés (yellow card) 84'; Puyol (yellow card) 86'; Mascherano (yellow card) 90+4'	Stadium: Vicente Calderón; Attendance: 53,000; Referee: David Fernández Borbalán (Andalusia)

22 September 2010 4	Barcelona	1–0	Sporting Gijón	Barcelona
20:00 CEST (UTC+02:00)	Villa 49'; Milito (yellow card) 78'; Piqué (yellow card) 90'	(Report); Live TV:	Rivera (yellow card) 5'; Cuéllar (yellow card) 40'; Matabuena (yellow card) 43'; Bilić (yellow card) 45+1'; Botía (yellow card) 52'	Stadium: Camp Nou; Attendance: 66,947; Referee: José Luis Paradas Romero (Andalusia)

25 September 2010 5	Athletic Bilbao	1–3	Barcelona	Bilbao
22:00 CEST (UTC+02:00)	Amorebieta (red card) 34'; Aurtenetxe (yellow card) 81'; Gabilondo 90'	(Report); Live TV:	Keita 55'; Piqué (yellow card) 59'; Xavi 74'; Villa (red card) 87'; Busquets 90+3'	Stadium: San Mamés; Attendance: 36,000; Referee: Antonio Mateu Lahoz (Valencian Community)

3 October 2010 6	Barcelona	1–1	Mallorca	Barcelona
19:00 CEST (UTC+02:00)	Messi 21'	(Report); Live TV:	Kevin (yellow card) 14'; Nsue 42'; Webó (yellow card) 52'; Aouate (yellow card) 59'; Castro (yellow card) 65'; Edson (yellow card) 85'; Pereira (yellow card) 87'	Stadium: Camp Nou; Attendance: 79,085; Referee: Alberto Undiano Mallenco (Navarre)

16 October 2010 7	Barcelona	2–1	Valencia	Barcelona
20:00 CEST (UTC+02:00)	Iniesta 47'; Keita (yellow card) 55'; Puyol 63'; Valdés (yellow card) 90+2'	(Report); Live TV:	Hernández 38'; Soldado (yellow card) 40'; Albelda (yellow card) 72'; César (yellow card) 90'; Aduriz (yellow card) 90+2'	Stadium: Camp Nou; Attendance: 87,975; Referee: Fernando Teixeira Vitienes (Cantabria)

23 October 2010 8	Zaragoza	0–2	Barcelona	Zaragoza
18:00 CEST (UTC+02:00)	Lanzaro (yellow card) 26'; Gabi (yellow card) 32'; Ponzio (red card) 47'; Lafita (yellow card) 71'; Braulio (yellow card) 85'	(Report); Live TV:	Messi 42', 66'; Piqué (yellow card) 88'	Stadium: La Romareda; Attendance: 26,000; Referee: Miguel Ángel Pérez Lasa (Basque Country)

30 October 2010 9	Barcelona	5–0	Sevilla	Barcelona
22:00 CEST (UTC+02:00)	Messi 4', 64'; Villa 24', 90'; Puyol (yellow card) 29'; Dani Alves 52'	(Report); Live TV:	Kanouté (yellow card) 21'; Alexis (yellow card) 29'; Konko (yellow card) 41' (yellow-red card) 45'	Stadium: Camp Nou; Attendance: 81,020; Referee: Javier Turienzo Álvarez (Castile and León)

7 November 2010 10	Getafe	1–3	Barcelona	Getafe
19:00 CET (UTC+01:00)	Díaz (yellow card) 37'; Boateng (yellow card) 58' (yellow-red card) 80'; Pintos (yellow card) 67'; Manu 70' (pen.), (yellow card) 89'	(Report); Live TV:	Messi 23'; Villa 34', (yellow card) 67'; Piqué (red card) 42'; Pedro 65'; Iniesta (yellow card) 88'	Stadium: Coliseum Alfonso Pérez; Attendance: 15,000; Referee: Miguel Ángel Ayza Gámez (Valencian Community)

13 November 2010 11	Barcelona	3–1	Villarreal	Barcelona
22:00 CET (UTC+01:00)	Villa 22'; Abidal (yellow card) 35'; Messi 58', 83'; Maxwell (yellow card) 68'	(Report)); Live TV:	Nilmar 26'; Valero (yellow card) 45'; López (yellow card) 73'; Senna (yellow card) 90'	Stadium: Camp Nou; Attendance: 80,766; Referee: Carlos Delgado Ferreiro (Basque Country)

20 November 2010 12	Almería	0–8	Barcelona	Almería
20:00 CET (UTC+01:00)	Vargas (yellow card) 31'; Bernardello (yellow card) 61'	(Report); Live TV:	Messi 17', 37', 67'; Iniesta 19'; Acasiete 27' (o.g.); Pedro 35'; Thiago (yellow card) 56'; Bojan 62', 73'	Stadium: Juegos Mediterráneos; Attendance: 13,097; Referee: César Muñiz Fernández (Asturias)

29 November 2010 13	Barcelona	5–0	Real Madrid	Barcelona
21:00 CET (UTC+01:00)	Xavi 10', (yellow card) 90+3'; Pedro 18'; Valdés (yellow card) 33'; Villa (yellow card) 34', (goal) 55', 58'; Messi (yellow card) 44'; Puyol (yellow card) 80'; Jeffrén 90+1'	(Report); Live TV:	Ronaldo (yellow card) 33'; Pepe (yellow card) 36'; Alonso (yellow card) 51'; Marcelo (yellow card) 56'; Casillas (yellow card) 56'; Carvalho (yellow card) 71'; Ramos (yellow card) 73' (red card) 90+3'; Khedira (yellow card) 75'	Stadium: Camp Nou; Attendance: 98,255; Referee: Eduardo Iturralde González (Basque Country)

4 December 2010 14	Osasuna	0–3	Barcelona	Pamplona
20:00 CET (UTC+01:00)	Soriano (yellow card) 48'; Puñal (yellow card) 71'; Lolo (yellow card) 85'	(Report); Live TV:	Pedro 26'; Messi 65', 84' (pen.)	Stadium: El Sadar; Attendance: 18,043; Referee: Fernando Teixeira Vitienes (Cantabria)

12 December 2010 15	Barcelona	5–0	Real Sociedad	Barcelona
21:00 CET (UTC+01:00)	Mascherano (yellow card) 7'; Villa 9'; Iniesta 33'; Messi 47', 87'; Bojan 90'	(Report); Live TV:		Stadium: Camp Nou; Attendance: 74,931; Referee: David Fernández Borbalán (Andalusia)

18 December 2010 16	Espanyol	1–5	Barcelona	Cornellà de Llobregat
20:00 CET (UTC+01:00)	Kameni (yellow card) 31'; Baena (yellow card) 36'; Osvaldo (yellow card) 37', (goal) 63'; Márquez (yellow card) 41'; Ruiz (yellow card) 67'	(Report); Live TV:	Pedro 19', 60'; Busquets (yellow card) 26'; Xavi 30'; Piqué (yellow card) 54'; Dani Alves (yellow card) 70'; Villa 76', 84'	Stadium: Estadi Cornellà-El Prat; Attendance: 40,010; Referee: Alberto Undiano Mallenco (Navarre)

2 January 2011 17	Barcelona	2–1	Levante	Barcelona
18:00 CET (UTC+01:00)	Bojan (yellow card) 45+2'; Pedro 47', 59'; Busquets (yellow card) 89'; Xavi (yellow card) 89'; Keita (yellow card) 90+3'	(Report); Live TV:	Nano (yellow card) 45+2'; Stuani 80', (yellow card) 90+2'	Stadium: Camp Nou; Attendance: 71,681; Referee: Miguel Ángel Pérez Lasa (Basque Country)

8 January 2011 18	Deportivo La Coruña	0–4	Barcelona	A Coruña
22:00 CET (UTC+01:00)	Pérez (yellow card) 51'	(Report); Live TV:	Villa 26'; Messi 52'; Iniesta 80'; Pedro 81'	Stadium: Estadio Riazor; Attendance: 34,500; Referee: Carlos Delgado Ferreiro (Basque Country)

16 January 2011 19	Barcelona	4–1	Málaga	Barcelona
21:00 CET (UTC+01:00)	Iniesta 8'; Villa 18', 74'; Pedro 36'; Abidal (yellow card) 76'	(Report); Live TV:	Demichelis (yellow card) 28'; Duda 68'	Stadium: Camp Nou; Attendance: 71,576; Referee: José Luis González González (Castile and León)

22 January 2011 20	Barcelona	3–0	Racing Santander	Barcelona
20:00 CET (UTC+01:00)	Pedro 2'; Messi 33' (pen.), (yellow card); Iniesta 56'	(Report); Live TV:		Stadium: Camp Nou; Attendance: 70,072; Referee: Ignacio Iglesias Villanueva (Galicia)

29 January 2011 21	Hércules	0–3	Barcelona	Alicante
20:00 CET (UTC+01:00)	Aguilar (yellow card) 33'; Peña (yellow card) 45+2'; Farinós (yellow card) 77' (yellow-red card) 85'	(Report); Live TV:	Pedro 43'; Dani Alves (yellow card) 83'; Messi 87', 89'	Stadium: José Rico Pérez; Attendance: 29,500; Referee: David Fernández Borbalán (Andalusia)

5 February 2011 22	Barcelona	3–0	Atlético Madrid	Barcelona
22:00 CET (UTC+01:00)	Messi 17', 28', 79', (yellow card) 68'; Dani Alves (yellow card) 45'	(Report); Live TV:	Ujfaluši (yellow card) 29'; Tiago (yellow card) 67'; Valera (yellow card) 88'	Stadium: Camp Nou; Attendance: 84,766; Referee: Javier Turienzo Álvarez (Castile and León)

12 February 2011 23	Sporting Gijón	1–1	Barcelona	Gijón
20:00 CET (UTC+01:00)	Barral (yellow card) 13', (goal) 16'; José Ángel (yellow card) 35'; Sastre (yellow card) 84'; Cuéllar (yellow card) 90'	(report); Live TV:	Mascherano (yellow card) 18'; Afellay (yellow card) 44'; Pinto (yellow card) 65'; Pedro (yellow card) 72'; Xavi (yellow card) 77'; Villa 80'; Valdés (yellow card) 90'	Stadium: El Molinón; Attendance: 23,481; Referee: Miguel Ángel Pérez Lasa (Basque Country)

20 February 2011 24	Barcelona	2–1	Athletic Bilbao	Barcelona
21:00 CET (UTC+01:00)	Villa 4'; Dani Alves (yellow card) 36'; Busquets (yellow card) 49'; Piqué (yellow card) 52'; Messi 78'	(Report); Live TV:	Koikili (yellow card) 24'; Iraola (yellow card) 32', (goal) 50' (pen.); Gurpegui (yellow card) 90+2'	Stadium: Camp Nou; Attendance: 83,533; Referee: Rafael Ramírez Domínguez (Andalusia)

26 February 2011 25	Mallorca	0–3	Barcelona	Palma
20:00 CET (UTC+01:00)	Martí (yellow card) 57'	(report); Live TV:	Messi 38'; Villa 57'; Pedro 66'	Stadium: Iberostar; Attendance: 23,142; Referee: Carlos Velasco Carballo (Community of Madrid)

2 March 2011 26	Valencia	0–1	Barcelona	Valencia
22:00 CET (UTC+01:00)	Alba (yellow card) 49'; Hernández (yellow card) 66'; T. Costa (yellow card) 78'; Soldado (yellow card) 90+1'	(Report); Live TV:	Messi (yellow card) 64', (goal) 76'	Stadium: Mestalla; Attendance: 55,000; Referee: Eduardo Iturralde González (Basque Country)

5 March 2011 27	Barcelona	1–0	Zaragoza	Barcelona
20:00 CET (UTC+01:00)	Keita 43'; Milito (yellow card) 58'	(Report); Live TV:	Lanzaro (yellow card) 90+3'	Stadium: Camp Nou; Attendance: 68,000; Referee: Fernando Teixeira Vitienes (Cantabria)

13 March 2011 28	Sevilla	1–1	Barcelona	Seville
20:00 CET (UTC+01:00)	Cáceres (yellow card) 25'; Zokora (yellow card) 28'; Navas 49'; Medel (yellow card) 62'; Navarro (yellow card) 63'; Capel (yellow card) 69'	(Report); Live TV:	Bojan 30'; Adriano (yellow card) 40'; Xavi (yellow card) 62'	Stadium: Ramón Sánchez Pizjuán; Attendance: 44,000; Referee: Miguel Ángel Pérez Lasa (Basque Country)

19 March 2011 29	Barcelona	2–1	Getafe	Barcelona
20:00 CET (UTC+01:00)	Dani Alves (yellow card) 2', (goal) 17'; Villa (yellow card) 30'; Bojan 50'; Xavi (yellow card) 90'	Report; Live TV:	Díaz (yellow card) 25'; Mosquera (yellow card) 87'; Manu 88'	Stadium: Camp Nou; Attendance: 81,913; Referee: César Muñiz Fernández (Asturias)

2 April 2011 30	Villarreal	0–1	Barcelona	Villarreal
20:00 CEST (UTC+02:00)	Bruno (yellow card) 15'; Marchena (yellow card) 50'	Report; Live TV:	Piqué (yellow card) 40', (goal) 66'; Dani Alves (yellow card) 55'; Valdés (yellow card) 90+2'; Busquets (yellow card) 90+3'	Stadium: El Madrigal; Attendance: 23,000; Referee: Rafael Ramírez Domínguez (Andalusia)

9 April 2011 31	Barcelona	3–1	Almería	Barcelona
20:00 CEST (UTC+02:00)	Bojan (yellow card) 17'; Mascherano (yellow card) 19'; Messi 53' (pen.), 90+2'; Thiago 64'; Villa (yellow card) 77'	Report; Live TV:	Bernardello (yellow card) 45'; Corona 50'; Diego Alves (yellow card) 52'; Ortiz (yellow card) 63'	Stadium: Camp Nou; Attendance: 80,452; Referee: Miguel Ángel Ayza Gámez (Valencian Community)

16 April 2011 32	Real Madrid	1–1	Barcelona	Madrid
22:00 CEST (UTC+02:00)	Marcelo (yellow card) 31'; Albiol (red card) 51'; Arbeloa (yellow card) 76'; Ronaldo 82' (pen.)	(Report); Live TV:	Adriano (yellow card) 9'; Piqué (yellow card) 27'; Messi 53' (pen.); Dani Alves (yellow card) 79'; Valdés (yellow card) 80'; Xavi (yellow card) 90+2'	Stadium: Santiago Bernabéu; Attendance: 80,354; Referee: César Muñiz Fernández (Asturias)

23 April 2011 33	Barcelona	2–0	Osasuna	Barcelona
20:00 CEST (UTC+02:00)	Villa 24'; Dani Alves (yellow card) 50'; Keita (yellow card) 80'; Messi 87'	(Report); Live TV:	Nekounam (yellow card) 77'; Timor (yellow card) 85'	Stadium: Camp Nou; Attendance: 73,285; Referee: Carlos Delgado Ferreiro (Basque Country)

30 April 2011 34	Real Sociedad	2–1	Barcelona	San Sebastián
20:00 CEST (UTC+02:00)	Tamudo (yellow card) 11'; Estrada (yellow card) 49'; Ifrán 71'; Prieto 82' (pen.)	(Report); Live TV:	Thiago 29'; Mascherano (yellow card) 81'	Stadium: Anoeta; Attendance: 34,850; Referee: Fernando Teixeira Vitienes (Cantabria)

8 May 2011 35	Barcelona	2–0	Espanyol	Barcelona
19:00 CEST (UTC+02:00)	Iniesta 29'; Piqué 47'; Pedro (yellow card) 62'	(Report); Live TV:	L. García (yellow card) 62'; Kameni (yellow card) 63'; Isaías (yellow card) 85'	Stadium: Camp Nou; Attendance: 89,994; Referee: David Fernández Borbalán (Andalusia)

11 May 2011 36	Levante	1–1	Barcelona	Valencia
20:00 CEST (UTC+02:00)	Caicedo 41'; Iborra (yellow card) 68'	(Report); Live TV:	Keita 28'; Piqué (yellow card) 65'	Stadium: Ciutat de València; Attendance: 20,473; Referee: José Luis Paradas Romero (Andalusia)

15 May 2011 37	Barcelona	0–0	Deportivo La Coruña	Barcelona
21:00 CEST (UTC+02:00)		(Report); Live TV:	Aythami (yellow card) 42'; Lopo (yellow card) 78'	Stadium: Camp Nou; Attendance: 70,044; Referee: Carlos Delgado Ferreiro (Basque Country)

21 May 2011 38	Málaga	1–3	Barcelona	Málaga
18:00 CEST (UTC+02:00)	Apoño (yellow card) 29'; Fernández 31'; Eliseu (yellow card) 44'; Gámez (yellow card) 45'	(Report); Live TV:	Bojan 44' (pen.); Dani Alves (yellow card) 74'; Afellay 76'; Bartra 84'	Stadium: La Rosaleda; Attendance: 28,000; Referee: Carlos Clos Gómez (Aragon)

=== Copa del Rey ===
==== Round of 32 ====
26 October 2010 First leg	Ceuta	0–2	Barcelona	Ceuta
22:00 CEST	Aridane (yellow card) 19'; Cañas (yellow card) 29'	Report	Maxwell 16'; Pedro 25'	Stadium: Estadio Alfonso Murube; Attendance: 6,200; Referee: Rafael Ramírez Domínguez (Andalusia)

10 November 2010 Second leg	Barcelona	5–1 (7–1 agg.)	Ceuta	Barcelona
22:00 CET	Nolito 2'; Milito 7'; Bartra (yellow card) 36'; Pedro 50'; Bojan 64'; Messi 68'	Report	Moreno (yellow card) 21' (red card) 26'; Guzmán 35'	Stadium: Camp Nou; Attendance: 38,971; Referee: Ignacio Iglesias Villanueva (Galicia)

==== Round of 16 ====
21 December 2010 First leg	Barcelona	0–0	Athletic Bilbao	Barcelona
20:00 CET	Piqué (yellow card) 90'	Report	Martínez (yellow card) 33'; Koikili (yellow card) 45'; Gabilondo (yellow card) 52'; Orbaiz (yellow card) 84'	Stadium: Camp Nou; Attendance: 45,207; Referee: Antonio Mateu Lahoz (Valencian Community)

5 January 2011 Second leg	Athletic Bilbao	1–1 (1–1 (a) agg.)	Barcelona	Bilbao
22:00 CET	Gurpegui (yellow card) 19'; Toquero (yellow card) 26'; Ustaritz (yellow card) 57'; Llorente 85'	Report	Busquets (yellow card) 53'; Abidal 75'; Pinto (yellow card) 80'	Stadium: San Mamés; Attendance: 39,750; Referee: César Muñiz Fernández (Asturias)

==== Quarter-finals ====
12 January 2011 First leg	Barcelona	5–0	Real Betis	Barcelona
22:00 CET	Messi 44', 62', 73'; Pedro 75'; Keita 82'			Stadium: Camp Nou; Attendance: 60,000; Referee: Carlos Velasco Carballo

19 January 2011 Second leg	Real Betis	3–1 (3–6 agg.)	Barcelona	Seville
22:00 CET	Molina 2', 7'; Arzu 45+1'		Messi 36'	Stadium: Estadio Benito Villamarín; Attendance: 35,000; Referee: Carlos Clos Gómez

==== Semi-finals ====
26 January 2011 First leg	Barcelona	5–0	Almería	Barcelona
22:00 CET	Messi 9', 16'; Villa 11'; Pedro 31'; Keita 88'	Report	Vargas (yellow card) 43'	Stadium: Camp Nou; Attendance: 49,875; Referee: Antonio Mateu Lahoz (Valencian Community)

2 February 2011 Second leg	Almería	0–3 (0–8 agg.)	Barcelona	Almería
20:00 CET	Michel (yellow card) 28'; Bernardello (yellow card) 62'	Report	Busquets (yellow card) 31'; Adriano 35'; Thiago 56'; Afellay 67'	Stadium: Juegos Mediterráneos; Attendance: 16,000; Referee: Miguel Ángel Ayza Gámez (Valencian Community)

==== Final ====
20 April 2011 Final	Barcelona	0–1 (a.e.t.)	Real Madrid	Valencia
21:30 CEST	Pedro (yellow card) 34'; Messi (yellow card) 65'; Adriano (yellow card) 117'	Report (in Spanish)	Pepe (yellow card) 26'; Alonso (yellow card) 60'; Adebayor (yellow card) 73'; Di María (yellow card) 85' (yellow-red card) 118'; Ronaldo 103'	Stadium: Mestalla; Attendance: 55,000; Referee: Alberto Undiano Mallenco (Navarre)

=== UEFA Champions League ===
==== Group stage ====
Pos	Team	Pld	W	D	L	GF	GA	GD	Pts	Qualification
1	(Spain) Barcelona	6	4	2	0	14	3	+11	14	Advance to knockout phase
2	(Denmark) Copenhagen	6	3	1	2	7	5	+2	10	Advance to knockout phase
3	(Russia) Rubin Kazan	6	1	3	2	2	4	−2	6	Transfer to Europa League
4	(Greece) Panathinaikos	6	0	2	4	2	13	−11	2	

Source: Soccerway

14 September 2010 1	Barcelona (Spain)	5–1	(Greece) Panathinaikos	Barcelona, Spain
20:45 CEST (UTC+02:00)	Messi 22', 45'; Villa 33'; Pedro 78'; Dani Alves 90+3'	Report	Govou 20'; Karagounis (yellow card) 85'	Stadium: Camp Nou; Attendance: 69,738; Referee: Nicola Rizzoli (Italy)

29 September 2010 2	Rubin Kazan (Russia)	1–1	(Spain) Barcelona	Kazan, Russia
18:30 CEST (UTC+02:00)	Noboa 30' (pen.); Salukvadze (yellow card) 40'; Ansaldi (yellow card) 74'; Sibaya (yellow card) 80'	Report	Puyol (yellow card) 52'; Villa 60' (pen.); Piqué (yellow card) 90+1'	Stadium: Central Stadium; Attendance: 23,950; Referee: Cüneyt Çakır (Turkey)

20 October 2010 3	Barcelona (Spain)	2–0	(Denmark) Copenhagen	Barcelona, Spain
20:45 CEST (UTC+02:00)	Messi 19', 90+2'; Iniesta (yellow card) 81'	Report	N'Doye (yellow card) 61'; Pospěch (yellow card) 68'	Stadium: Camp Nou; Attendance: 75,852; Referee: Stéphane Lannoy (France)

2 November 2010 4	Copenhagen (Denmark)	1–1	(Spain) Barcelona	Copenhagen, Denmark
20:45 CET (UTC+01:00)	Claudemir 32'; Pospěch (yellow card) 89'	Report	Messi 31'; Busquets (yellow card) 50'	Stadium: Parken Stadium; Attendance: 38,065; Referee: Pavel Cristian Balaj (Romania)

24 November 2010 5	Panathinaikos (Greece)	0–3	(Spain) Barcelona	Athens, Greece
20:45 CET (UTC+01:00)	Dimoutsos (yellow card) 66'	Report	Pedro 27', 69'; Piqué (yellow card) 31'; Messi 62'	Stadium: Olympic Stadium; Attendance: 58,466; Referee: Gianluca Rocchi (Italy)

7 December 2010 6	Barcelona (Spain)	2–0	(Russia) Rubin Kazan	Barcelona, Spain
20:45 CET (UTC+01:00)	Fontàs 51'; Vázquez 83'	Report	Ryzhikov (yellow card) 24'	Stadium: Camp Nou; Attendance: 50,436; Referee: Jonas Eriksson (Sweden)

==== Knockout phase ====
===== Round of 16 =====
16 February 2011 First leg	Arsenal (England)	2–1	(Spain) Barcelona	London, England
20:45 CET (UTC+01:00)	Song (yellow card) 7'; Nasri (yellow card) 27'; Van Persie 78', (yellow card) 86'; Arshavin 83'	Report	Villa 26'	Stadium: Emirates Stadium; Attendance: 59,927; Referee: Nicola Rizzoli (Italy)

8 March 2011 Second leg	Barcelona (Spain)	3–1 (4–3 agg.)	(England) Arsenal	Barcelona, Spain
20:45 CET (UTC+01:00)	Messi 45+3', 71' (pen.); Xavi 69'	Report	Koscielny (yellow card) 16'; Sagna (yellow card) 29'; Wilshere (yellow card) 36'; Van Persie (yellow card) 45+1' (yellow-red card) 55'; Busquets 53' (o.g.)	Stadium: Camp Nou; Attendance: 95,486; Referee: Massimo Busacca (Switzerland)

===== Quarter-finals =====
6 April 2011 First leg	Barcelona (Spain)	5–1	(Ukraine) Shakhtar Donetsk	Barcelona, Spain
20:45 CEST (UTC+02:00)	Iniesta 2', (yellow card) 59'; Dani Alves 34'; Piqué 53'; Keita 60'; Xavi 86'	Report	Raț (yellow card) 51'; Rakitskiy 60', (yellow card) 66'; Fernandinho (yellow card) 77'	Stadium: Camp Nou; Attendance: 86,518; Referee: Craig Thomson (Scotland)

12 April 2011 Second leg	Shakhtar Donetsk (Ukraine)	0–1 (1–6 agg.)	(Spain) Barcelona	Donetsk, Ukraine
20:45 CEST (UTC+02:00)	Mkhitaryan (yellow card) 56'; Ischenko (yellow card) 60'	Report	Messi 43'; Milito (yellow card) 71'	Stadium: Donbass Arena; Attendance: 51,579; Referee: Florian Meyer (Germany)

===== Semi-finals =====
27 April 2011 First leg	Real Madrid (Spain)	0–2	(Spain) Barcelona	Madrid, Spain
20:45 CEST (UTC+02:00)	Arbeloa (yellow card) 40'; Ramos (yellow card) 53'; Pepe (red card) 61'; Adebayor (yellow card) 83'	Report	Dani Alves (yellow card) 44'; Pinto (red card) 45+2'; Mascherano (yellow card) 57'; Messi 76', 87'	Stadium: Santiago Bernabéu; Attendance: 71,567; Referee: Wolfgang Stark (Germany)
Note: Real Madrid manager José Mourinho was ejected in the 61st minute for protesting Pepe's red card.

3 May 2011 Second leg	Barcelona (Spain)	1–1 (3–1 agg.)	(Spain) Real Madrid	Barcelona, Spain
20:45 CEST (UTC+02:00)	Pedro 54', (yellow card) 82'	Report	Carvalho (yellow card) 13'; Diarra (yellow card) 57'; Marcelo 64', (yellow card) 75'; Alonso (yellow card) 68'; Adebayor (yellow card) 85'	Stadium: Camp Nou; Attendance: 95,701; Referee: Frank De Bleeckere (Belgium)

===== Final =====
28 May 2011 Final	Barcelona (Spain)	3–1	(England) Manchester United	London, England
20:45 CEST (UTC+02:00)	Pedro 27'; Messi 54'; Dani Alves (yellow card) 60'; Villa 69'; Valdés (yellow card) 85'	Report	Rooney 34'; Carrick (yellow card) 61'; Valencia (yellow card) 79'	Stadium: Wembley Stadium; Attendance: 87,695; Referee: Viktor Kassai (Hungary)
