= Cristian Alberdi =

Spanish footballer

Personal information
- Full name: Cristian Alberdi López
- Date of birth: 14 April 1980 (age 46)
- Place of birth: San Sebastián, Spain
- Height: 1.81 m (5 ft 11 in)
- Position: Central midfielder

Youth career
- –2000: Real Sociedad

Senior career*
| Years | Team | Apps | (Gls) |
| 2000–2002 | Real Sociedad B | 32+ | (2+) |
| 2002–2003 | Real Unión | 13 | (1) |
| 2003–2004 | Pájara Playas | 33 | (1) |
| 2004–2005 | Benidorm | 28 | (0) |
| 2005–2006 | Real Unión | 21 | (1) |
| 2006–2007 | Cultural Leonesa | 22 | (0) |
| 2007–2008 | Logroñés | 34 | (0) |
| 2008–2011 | Alcorcón | 73 | (3) |
| 2011–2014 | Amorebieta | 43 | (2) |
| Total | | 299+ | (10+) |
- * Club domestic league appearances and goals

Cristian Alberdi López (born 14 April 1980) is a Spanish retired footballer who played as a central midfielder.

== Club career ==
Born in San Sebastián, Gipuzkoa, Alberdi finished his youth career with local Real Sociedad and made his senior debuts with the reserves in the 2000–01 season, being promoted from Tercera División. In summer 2002, he joined Real Unión, in Segunda División B.

In the following seven years, Alberdi competed in the third division, representing UD Pájara Playas de Jandía, Benidorm CF, Real Unión, Cultural y Deportiva Leonesa, Logroñés CF and AD Alcorcón. Later he achieved promotion in 2010, despite being rarely used during the campaign.

On 2 September 2010, aged 30, Alberdi made his professional debut, starting in a 3–2 home win against Celta de Vigo for the season's Copa del Rey. Three days later he played his first game in Segunda División, coming on as a late substitute in a 2–0 home success over SD Ponferradina.

On 29 July 2011, Alberdi signed with SD Amorebieta, thus returning to division three.
