= 2010–11 in Spanish football =

The 2010–11 season was the 107th season of competitive football in Spain.

The season began on 8 August 2010 for the Copa Federación, 25 August 2010 for the Copa del Rey and 28 August for La Liga and the other three divisions. The season ended on 21 May 2011 for La Liga, on 18 June 2011 for Segunda División and on 26 June for the other two divisions.

== Promotion and relegation (pre-season) ==
Teams promoted to 2010–11 La Liga

- Real Sociedad
- Hércules CF
- Levante UD

Teams relegated from 2009–10 La Liga

- Real Valladolid
- CD Tenerife
- Xerez CD

Teams promoted to 2010–11 Segunda División

- Granada CF
- SD Ponferradina
- AD Alcorcón
- FC Barcelona B

Teams relegated from 2009–10 Segunda División

- Cádiz CF
- Real Murcia
- Real Unión
- CD Castellón

Teams promoted to 2010–11 Segunda División B

- Deportivo B
- CF Gandía
- CD Atlético Baleares
- CD Alcalá
- Real Sociedad B
- CD Teruel
- CD Badajoz
- Caudal Deportivo
- Rayo Vallecano B
- Getafe CF B
- Yeclano Deportivo
- Jumilla CF
- Coruxo FC
- FC Santboià
- CD La Muela
- UD Alzira
- Peña Sport FC
- Extremadura UD
- CE L'Hospitalet

Teams relegated from 2009–10 Segunda División B

- Sestao River
- CD Izarra
- Racing Ferrol
- SD Compostela
- CD Toledo
- Racing de Santander B
- CF Villanovense
- CD Tenerife B
- UD Lanzarote
- RCD Espanyol B
- Villajoyosa CF
- Valencia CF Mestalla
- CF Gavà
- Terrassa FC
- Real Murcia B
- Moratalla CF
- Jerez Industrial CF
- UD Marbella

== National team ==
The home team is on the left column; the away team is on the right column.

=== UEFA Euro qualifiers ===
Spain was in Group I of the Euro 2012 qualification process.

3 September 2010	Liechtenstein	0 – 4	Spain	Vaduz, Liechtenstein
20:45 UTC+2			Torres 18', 54'; Villa 26'; Silva 62'	Stadium: Rheinpark Stadion; Attendance: 6,127; Referee: Bülent Yıldırım (Turkey)

8 October 2010	Spain	3 – 1	Lithuania	Villares de la Reina
22:00 UTC+2	Llorente 47', 56'; Silva 79'		Šernas 54'	Stadium: Estadio El Helmántico; Attendance: 16,800; Referee: Gianluca Rocchi (Italy)

12 October 2010	Scotland	2 – 3	Spain	Glasgow, Scotland
20:00 UTC+2	Naismith 58'; Piqué 67' (o.g.)		Villa 44' (pen.); Iniesta 55'; Llorente 79'	Stadium: Hampden Park; Attendance: 51,322; Referee: Massimo Busacca (Switzerland)

25 March 2011	Spain	2 – 1	Czech Republic	Granada
22:00 UTC+1	Villa 69', 73' (pen.)		Plašil 29'	Stadium: Estadio Nuevo Los Cármenes; Attendance: 16,400; Referee: Viktor Kassai (Hungary)

29 March 2011	Lithuania	1 – 3	Spain	Kaunas, Lithuania
20:45 UTC+3	Stankevičius 57'		Xavi 19'; Kijanskas 70' (o.g.); Mata 83'	Stadium: S. Darius and S. Girėnas Stadium; Attendance: 7,000; Referee: Laurent Duhamel (France)

=== Friendlies ===
7 September 2010	Argentina	4 – 1	Spain	Buenos Aires, Argentina
17:00 UTC-3	Messi 10'; Higuaín 13'; Tevez 34'; Agüero 90+1'		Llorente 84'	Stadium: Estadio Monumental Antonio Vespucio Liberti; Attendance: 65,000; Referee: Óscar Ruiz (Colombia)

17 November 2010	Portugal	4 – 0	Spain	Lisbon, Portugal
20:45 UTC+0	Martins 45'; Postiga 49', 68'; Almeida 90+3'			Stadium: Estádio da Luz; Attendance: 38,000; Referee: Antony Gautier (France)

9 February 2011	Spain	1 – 0	Colombia	Madrid
21:30 UTC+1	Silva 86'			Stadium: Estadio Santiago Bernabéu; Attendance: 76,000; Referee: Richard Trutz (Slovakia)

4 June 2011	United States	0 – 4	Spain	Boston, United States
22:41 UTC-5			27', 41' Cazorla; 32' Negredo; 73' Torres	Stadium: Gillette Stadium; Attendance: 68,000; Referee: Roberto Silvera (Uruguay)

7 June 2011	Venezuela	0 – 3	Spain	Puerto la Cruz, Venezuela
22:30 UTC-4:30			5' Villa; 20' Pedro; 45' Alonso	Stadium: Estadio Olímpico Luis Ramos; Attendance: 37,000; Referee: Georges Buckley (Peru)

== Honours ==
=== Trophy & League Champions ===
Competition	Winner	Details	At
La Liga	FC Barcelona	2010–11 La Liga; Drew with Levante UD 1–1.	Estadi Ciutat de València
Copa del Rey	Real Madrid	2010–11 Copa del Rey; Beat FC Barcelona 1–0.	Mestalla
Copa Federación de España	CD Puertollano	2010–11 Copa Federación de España; Beat SD Lemona 4–3 on agg. (0–2 home and 4–1 away)	Arnolagusia
Segunda División	Real Betis	2010–11 Segunda División.Beat Villarreal CF B 2–1.	Benito Villamarín
Segunda División B	Real Murcia	2010–11 Segunda División B Beat CE Sabadell 1–1(9–8 p) on agg. (0–1 away and 1–0 home)	Nueva Condomina
Supercopa de España	FC Barcelona	2010 Supercopa de España; Beat Sevilla FC 5–3 on agg. (1–3 away and 4–0 home)	Camp Nou

== League tables ==
=== La Liga ===
Pos	Team	Pld	W	D	L	GF	GA	GD	Pts	Qualification or relegation
1	Barcelona (C)	38	30	6	2	95	21	+74	96	Qualification for the Champions League group stage
2	Real Madrid	38	29	5	4	102	33	+69	92	Qualification for the Champions League group stage
3	Valencia	38	21	8	9	64	44	+20	71	Qualification for the Champions League group stage
4	Villarreal	38	18	8	12	54	44	+10	62	Qualification for the Champions League play-off round
5	Sevilla	38	17	7	14	62	61	+1	58 (Note: SEV: 7 pts; ATH: 6 pts; ATM: 4 pts)	Qualification for the Europa League play-off round
6	Athletic Bilbao	38	18	4	16	59	55	+4	58	Qualification for the Europa League play-off round
7	Atlético Madrid	38	17	7	14	62	53	+9	58	Qualification for the Europa League third qualifying round (Note: The 2010–11 Copa del Rey champions (Real Madrid) and runners-up (Barcelona) qualified for the 2011–12 UEFA Champions League, thus the 7th-placed team qualified for the 2011–12 UEFA Europa League.)
8	Espanyol	38	15	4	19	46	55	−9	49	
9	Osasuna	38	13	8	17	45	46	−1	47 (Note: OSA 1–1 SPG; SPG 1–1 OSA)	
10	Sporting Gijón	38	11	14	13	35	42	−7	47	
11	Málaga	38	13	7	18	54	68	−14	46 (Note: MLG 4–1 RAC; RAC 1–2 MLG)	
12	Racing Santander	38	12	10	16	41	56	−15	46	
13	Zaragoza	38	12	9	17	40	53	−13	45 (Note: ZAR: 9 pts; LEV: 4 pts → LEV 2–1 RSO; RSO: 4 pts → RSO 1–1 LEV)	
14	Levante	38	12	9	17	41	52	−11	45	
15	Real Sociedad	38	14	3	21	49	66	−17	45	
16	Getafe	38	12	8	18	49	60	−11	44 (Note: GET 3–0 MLL; MLL 2–0 GET)	
17	Mallorca	38	12	8	18	41	56	−15	44	
18	Deportivo La Coruña (R)	38	10	13	15	31	47	−16	43	Relegation to the Segunda División
19	Hércules (R)	38	9	8	21	36	60	−24	35	Relegation to the Segunda División
20	Almería (R)	38	6	12	20	36	70	−34	30	Relegation to the Segunda División

Source: LFP, sportec.es, Yahoo! Sport
Rules for classification: 1st points; 2nd head-to-head points; 3rd head-to-head goal difference; 4th head-to-head goals scored; 5th goal difference; 6th number of goals scored; 7th Fair-play points
(C) Champions; (R) Relegated

=== Segunda División ===
Pos	Team	Pld	W	D	L	GF	GA	GD	Pts	Promotion, qualification or relegation
1	Betis (C, P)	42	25	8	9	85	44	+41	83	Promotion to La Liga
2	Rayo Vallecano (P)	42	23	10	9	73	48	+25	79	Promotion to La Liga
3	Barcelona B (Note: Barcelona B could not participate in the play-offs as they are Barcelona's reserve team, so the seventh positioned team qualified for the play-offs.)	42	20	11	11	85	62	+23	71	
4	Elche	42	18	15	9	55	42	+13	69	Qualification to promotion play-offs
5	Granada (P)	42	18	14	10	71	47	+24	68	Qualification to promotion play-offs
6	Celta de Vigo	42	17	16	9	62	43	+19	67	Qualification to promotion play-offs
7	Valladolid	42	19	9	14	65	51	+14	66	Qualification to promotion play-offs
8	Xerez	42	17	9	16	60	64	−4	60	
9	Alcorcón	42	17	7	18	57	52	+5	58	
10	Numancia	42	17	6	19	65	63	+2	57 (Note: GIR 2–0 NUM; NUM 4–0 GIR)	
11	Girona	42	15	12	15	58	56	+2	57	
12	Recreativo	42	12	20	10	44	37	+7	56 (Note: REC 3–0 CAR; CAR 1–3 REC)	
13	Cartagena	42	16	8	18	48	63	−15	56	
14	Huesca	42	13	16	13	39	45	−6	55	
15	Las Palmas	42	13	15	14	56	71	−15	54	
16	Córdoba	42	13	13	16	58	63	−5	52	
17	Villarreal B	42	15	6	21	43	63	−20	51	
18	Gimnàstic	42	12	13	17	37	45	−8	49	
19	Salamanca (R)	42	13	7	22	46	68	−22	46	Relegation to Segunda División B
20	Tenerife (R)	42	9	11	22	42	66	−24	38	Relegation to Segunda División B
21	Ponferradina (R)	42	5	19	18	36	63	−27	34	Relegation to Segunda División B
22	Albacete (R)	42	7	11	24	35	64	−29	32	Relegation to Segunda División B

Source: FBref – 2010–2011 Segunda Stats
Rules for classification: 1st points; 2nd head-to-head points; 3rd head-to-head goal difference; 4th head-to-head goals scored; 5th goal difference; 6th number of goals scored; 7th Fair-play points
(C) Champions; (P) Promoted; (R) Relegated
