= Juan Ángel Seguro =

Mexican footballer (born 1984)

Personal information
- Full name: Juan Ángel Seguro Rodríguez
- Date of birth: 19 January 1984 (age 42)
- Place of birth: Mexico City, Mexico
- Height: 1.73 m (5 ft 8 in)
- Position: Midfielder

Youth career
- Osasuna

Senior career*
Years	Team	Apps	(Gls)
2003–2006	Osasuna B	77	(7)
2004	Osasuna	2	(0)
2006–2010	Real Unión	95	(9)
2010–2011	Ceuta	27	(3)
2011–2013	Real Unión	20	(1)
2013	Victoria Hamburg	15	(2)
2013–2014	Sestao	31	(1)
2014–2015	Izarra	34	(8)
2015–2016	Burladés		
2016–2017	Pamplona		
Total		301	(31)
- * Club domestic league appearances and goals

Juan Ángel Seguro Rodríguez (born 19 January 1984) is a Mexican former professional footballer who played as a midfielder. He also held Spanish citizenship.

== Football career ==
Born in Mexico City, Seguro made his debuts with CA Osasuna, joining its youth ranks from his homeland. During the 2003–04 season he first appeared with the first team and in La Liga, coming on as a late substitute at home against Albacete Balompié (1–1 draw on 18 January 2004) and FC Barcelona (2–1 loss, 8 February); during his spell in Navarre he was mainly registered with the reserves and also coincided with countryman Javier Aguirre, who had been coaching the main squad since 2002.

In 2006, Seguro signed with Basque neighbours Real Unión, helping the Irun club return to the second division in his third year but being rarely used in the following – only one quarter of the matches – in an immediate relegation back. He returned to the third level in summer 2010, joining AD Ceuta.

Late into the 2013 winter transfer window, after a further one-and-a-half seasons with Unión, Seguro moved to Germany and joined Regionalliga Nord side SC Victoria Hamburg. After only a few months, however, he returned to his country of adoption and signed for Sestao River Club.

Seguro returned to Navarre on 25 July 2014, joining amateurs CD Izarra. Roughly a year later, he moved to UCD Burladés also in the fourth tier.
