= David Cañas =

Spanish footballer

Personal information
- Full name: David Cañas Fernández
- Date of birth: 26 August 1978 (age 48)
- Place of birth: Castilleja de la Cuesta, Spain
- Height: 1.86 m (6 ft 1 in)
- Position: Centre-back

Youth career
- Sevilla

Senior career*
Years	Team	Apps	(Gls)
1997–1999	Sevilla B	42	(1)
1998–2000	Sevilla	13	(0)
1999–2000	→ Getafe (loan)	27	(0)
2000–2001	Ceuta	27	(1)
2001–2003	Poli Ejido	60	(1)
2003–2005	Salamanca	59	(3)
2005–2008	Albacete	60	(3)
2008–2010	Girona	57	(5)
2010–2011	Ceuta	26	(4)
Total		371	(18)

International career
1995	Spain U16	1	(0)
- * Club domestic league appearances and goals

David Cañas Fernández (born 26 August 1978) is a Spanish retired professional footballer who played mainly as a central defender but also as a defensive midfielder.

== Club career ==
Cañas was born in Castilleja de la Cuesta, Province of Seville. He played 13 games for hometown club Sevilla FC in the 1998–99 season, with the Andalusians in the Segunda División.

During his career, Cañas also represented Getafe CF, AD Ceuta (two spells, both in Segunda División B), Polideportivo Ejido, UD Salamanca, Albacete Balompié and Girona FC, appearing in 276 matches in the second tier of Spanish football over 11 seasons and scoring 12 goals. In early 2011 he was diagnosed with testicular cancer, being sidelined for 50 days for treatment but eventually returning to finish the campaign with Ceuta, following which he retired at the age of 32.
