= Vítor Moreno =

Cape Verdean footballer (born 1980)

Personal information
- Full name: Vítor Manuel Borges Moreno
- Date of birth: 29 November 1980 (age 45)
- Place of birth: Lisbon, Portugal
- Height: 1.80 m (5 ft 11 in)
- Position: Right-back

Youth career
- 1992–1999: Futebol Benfica

Senior career*
Years	Team	Apps	(Gls)
1999–2002	Futebol Benfica		
2002–2003	Odivelas	29	(1)
2003–2005	Barreirense	67	(8)
2005	Estoril	11	(1)
2006–2007	Vitória Guimarães	27	(0)
2007–2009	Estrela Amadora	38	(3)
2009–2010	União Leiria	14	(1)
2010–2011	Ceuta	27	(0)
2011–2012	Estoril	4	(0)
2012–2013	Atlético	32	(3)
2013–2014	Portimonense	35	(0)
2014–2015	1º Dezembro	4	(0)
2015–2016	Cova Piedade	22	(3)
2016–2017	Pinhalnovense	4	(0)
Total		314	(20)

International career
2005–2010	Cape Verde	13	(0)
- * Club domestic league appearances and goals

Vítor Manuel Borges Moreno (born 29 November 1980 in Lisbon) is a Cape Verdean former footballer who played as a right-back.
