= César Negredo =

Spanish footballer (born 1980)

Personal information
- Full name: César Negredo Sánchez
- Date of birth: 2 August 1980 (age 46)
- Place of birth: Madrid, Spain
- Height: 1.84 m (6 ft 0 in)
- Position: Defender

Youth career
- Real Madrid

Senior career*
Years	Team	Apps	(Gls)
1999–2000	Atlético Madrid B	0	(0)
2000–2001	Mensajero	27	(0)
2001–2002	Getafe	26	(0)
2002–2003	Real Jaén	25	(1)
2003–2004	Badajoz	23	(1)
2004–2005	Don Benito	37	(1)
2005–2006	Huesca	35	(2)
2006–2007	Villajoyosa	35	(3)
2007–2008	Logroñés	27	(1)
2008–2009	Alcoyano	32	(6)
2009–2010	Badajoz	19	(0)
2010	Sangonera Atlético	14	(0)
2010–2012	Real Oviedo	61	(2)
2012–2017	Covadonga		
Total		361+	(17+)

Managerial career
- 2018: Recreativo Huelva
- * Club domestic league appearances and goals

César Negredo Sánchez (born 2 August 1980) is a Spanish former footballer who played as a defender. He spent most of his career in the Segunda División B, playing 361 games and scoring 17 goals for 12 clubs.

== Playing career ==
Negredo was born in Madrid as the first of three sons of a taxi driver. His brothers Álvaro and Rubén also became footballers, with the former becoming a Spain international whose clubs included Sevilla and Manchester City. While his father was not interested in football, Negredo took up the sport and joined the academy of Real Madrid, setting the example for his younger brothers.

Negredo spent his senior career in Segunda División B. In August 2003, he and teammate José Antonio Navarro transferred from Real Jaén to Badajoz. Two years later, after the relegation of fellow Extremaduran club Don Benito, he spent a year at Huesca.

Following a year at Villajoyosa, Negredo joined Logroñés in 2007. The club from La Rioja went through financial problems that would lead to their dissolution, owing him €21,500. In 2008, he signed for Alcoyano, scoring a career-best 6 goals, including the last-minute winner in a 2–1 victory at local rivals Orihuela on 21 December. His team won the group and qualified for the play-offs, where he scored in a 2–2 draw in the second leg, losing 4–3 on aggregate to Cartagena.

In July 2009, Negredo transferred to Alicante, moving halfway across the season to Sangonera Atlético. The move was brought about by a lack of payment from Alicante, with the club's manager Vicente Borge recommending him for his next transfer, to Borge's former club as a player Real Oviedo in July 2010. He renewed his contract for one more year in July 2011.

Remaining in the city of Oviedo, Negredo signed for Covadonga in the Tercera División in September 2012. In June 2017, as captain, the 36-year-old signed for another season.

== Coaching career ==
In July 2017, Negredo joined the coaching staff at Recreativo de Huelva. After the dismissal of Javier Casquero, he was assistant manager to Ángel López from November, and replaced him as interim manager in February 2018. On his debut on 18 February, the team came from behind to win 3–1 at home to Écija. He remained in charge until the end of the season, having saved the club from relegation.

In June 2018, Negredo joined Racing de Santander as assistant to his former Oviedo teammate Iván Ania. Ania and his entire coaching staff were dismissed in November 2019. The pair resumed their roles at Algeciras and Córdoba.
