= Manu Busto =

Spanish footballer

Personal information
- Full name: Manuel Adolfo Busto Loza
- Date of birth: 7 October 1980 (age 46)
- Place of birth: Santander, Spain
- Height: 1.68 m (5 ft 6 in)
- Position: Forward

Youth career
- Bansander

Senior career*
| Years | Team | Apps | (Gls) |
| 1998–2002 | Valladolid B | | |
| 2002–2006 | Pontevedra | 67 | (17) |
| 2004–2005 | → Castellón (loan) | 30 | (3) |
| 2006–2007 | Jaén | 45 | (14) |
| 2007–2009 | Lorca Deportiva | 65 | (20) |
| 2009–2013 | Oviedo | 135 | (49) |
| 2013 | Levadiakos | 8 | (0) |
| 2014–2015 | Portugalete | 23 | (3) |
| 2015–2017 | Tropezón | 23 | (8) |
| 2017–2018 | Bezana | 11 | (9) |
| 2018–2019 | Naval | 35 | (6) |
| 2020–2021 | Miengo | 1 | (0) |
| 2021–2022 | Bezana | 31 | (8) |
- * Club domestic league appearances and goals

Manuel 'Manu' Adolfo Busto Loza (born 7 October 1980) is a Spanish former footballer who played as a forward.

== Club career ==
Busto was born in Santander, Cantabria. He only played lower league football in his country, amassing Segunda División B totals of 381 games and 111 goals for Real Valladolid B, Pontevedra CF (two spells), CD Castellón, Real Jaén, Lorca Deportiva CF and Real Oviedo, over 12 seasons.

In the summer of 2013, aged nearly 33, Busto moved abroad, making his professional debut with Levadiakos FC. He played his first top-tier match on 26 August, coming on as a 55th-minute substitute in a 2–0 away loss against Ergotelis F.C. in the Super League Greece.
