= Rubén Rosquete =

Spanish footballer

Personal information
- Full name: Rubén Rosquete Abreu
- Date of birth: 17 August 1989 (age 37)
- Place of birth: Icod de los Vinos, Spain
- Height: 1.74 m (5 ft 8 1/2 in)
- Position: Forward

Team information
- Current team: Las Zocas

Youth career
- Tenerife

Senior career*
Years	Team	Apps	(Gls)
2006–2007	Tenerife C	17	(6)
2007–2010	Tenerife B	80	(33)
2008–2012	Tenerife	13	(2)
2010–2011	→ Murcia (loan)	9	(0)
2012	Fyllingen	2	(1)
2012–2014	Atlético Granadilla	61	(23)
2014–2015	Tenerife Ibarra	25	(5)
2015–2019	Icodense		
2020–2021	Atlético Unión Güímar		
2021–	Las Zocas		
- * Club domestic league appearances and goals as of 23 May 2025

Rubén Rosquete Abreu (born 17 August 1989 in Icod de los Vinos, Tenerife) is a Spanish footballer who plays for UD Las ZOcas as a striker.
