= Jorge Pelegrina =

Spanish footballer (born 1984)

Personal information
- Full name: Jorge Juan Pelegrina Linares
- Date of birth: 23 April 1984 (age 42)
- Place of birth: Adra, Spain
- Height: 1.83 m (6 ft 0 in)
- Position: Defender

Team information
- Current team: Ibiza

Youth career
- Adra

Senior career*
Years	Team	Apps	(Gls)
2003–2004	Adra		
2004–2005	Valladolid B		
2005–2008	Almería B	32	(2)
2006–2008	Almería	1	(0)
2006–2008	→ Águilas (loan)	60	(3)
2008–2009	Pontevedra	25	(2)
2009–2012	Puertollano	80	(4)
2012–2013	La Roda	24	(1)
2013–2014	San Fernando	27	(1)
2014–2016	Socuéllamos	54	(5)
2016	Ibiza	7	(2)
2017	CD Adra Milenaria	8	(2)
2018	CD Adra Milenaria	2	(0)
2023–2024	CD Adra	16	(6)
- * Club domestic league appearances and goals

Jorge Juan Pelegrina Linares (born 23 April 1984) is a Spanish former footballer who played as a defender.

== Club career ==
Born in Adra, Andalusia, Pelegrina made his senior debuts with local AD Adra in the 2003–04 season. After a year with Real Valladolid B, he signed with UD Almería in 2005 summer, being initially assigned with the reserves in the Tercera División. On 11 June 2006 Pelegrina made his professional debut with the main squad, starting in a 3–1 home win over UE Lleida in the Segunda División.

In the following years Pelegrina competed in the Segunda División B, representing Águilas CF (on loan), Pontevedra CF, CD Puertollano, La Roda CF, San Fernando CD and UD Socuéllamos.
