= Dieguito (footballer, born 1989) =

Spanish footballer

Personal information
- Full name: Diego Martínez Macarro
- Date of birth: 20 March 1989 (age 37)
- Place of birth: Cádiz, Spain
- Height: 1.70 m (5 ft 7 in)
- Position: Midfielder

Team information
- Current team: Mons Calpe
- Number: 10

Senior career*
Years	Team	Apps	(Gls)
2008–2010	Cádiz B		
2010–2013	Cádiz	30	(0)
2013–2014	Asteras Magoula	21	(4)
2014–2015	Olympiacos Volos	14	(0)
2016	Arcos		
2016–2017	UP Plasencia		
2017–2018	Lincoln Red Imps	38	(7)
2018–	Mons Calpe	23	(1)
- * Club domestic league appearances and goals as of 17 December 2019

Diego Martínez Macarro (born 20 March 1989), simply known as Dieguito is a Spanish professional footballer who plays for Mons Calpe in the Gibraltar Premier Division.

== Club career ==
He played for Cádiz B between 2008 and 2010. After being promoted to the first team, he made 30 appearances for the side before joining Asteras Magoula in 2013.

=== Lincoln Red Imps ===
A few years in the lower leagues of Spain ended with a January 2017 move to Gibraltar Premier Division giants Lincoln Red Imps, who earlier in the season had earned a shock victory over Celtic in the UEFA Champions League. He scored on his debut, coming off the bench in a 15-0 demolition of Europa Point.
