= Sergio Rodríguez (footballer, born 1989) =

Spanish footballer

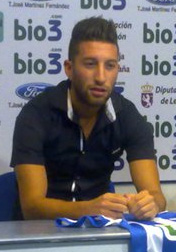
- Rodríguez being presented at Ponferradina

Personal information
- Full name: Sergio Rodríguez Cidoncha
- Date of birth: 5 October 1989 (age 37)
- Place of birth: Mérida, Spain
- Height: 1.80 m (5 ft 11 in)
- Position: Left-back

Team information
- Current team: Santa Coloma
- Number: 15

Youth career
- Mérida
- Levante

Senior career*
Years	Team	Apps	(Gls)
2008	Levante B	4	(0)
2008–2009	Granada	20	(0)
2009–2010	Valencia B	17	(1)
2010–2011	Melilla	18	(1)
2011–2013	Ponferradina	43	(2)
2013–2014	Oviedo	19	(0)
2014–2015	Sestao	37	(0)
2015–2016	Marbella	36	(0)
2016–2017	Extremadura	12	(0)
2017–2018	Lorca Deportiva	42	(0)
2018–2019	Coruxo	38	(0)
2019–2021	Lorca Deportiva	41	(0)
2022	Surkhon	18	(0)
2023–2024	Santa Coloma	32	(0)
2024–2025	Jaén	25	(0)
2025–	Santa Coloma	14	(0)
- * Club domestic league appearances and goals as of 15 June 2026

Sergio Rodríguez Cidoncha (born 5 October 1989) is a Spanish professional footballer who plays for Andorran club FC Santa Coloma as a left-back.

== Club career ==
Born in Mérida, Extremadura, Rodríguez moved from his hometown club Mérida UD to Levante UD as a youth, and made his senior debut for the latter's reserves on 13 April 2008 in a 3–2 home loss against CF Gavà in the Segunda División B, adding three more appearances in a season that ended with relegation. He remained in that level the next three years, in service of Granada CF, Valencia CF Mestalla (who also descended) and UD Melilla.

Rodríguez signed for SD Ponferradina in 2011, helping them to promotion to Segunda División in his first year. His first professional match took place on 1 September 2012, when he came on as a substitute for Didac for the final 14 minutes of a 1–0 away defeat to Girona FC. He totalled 57 competitive games during his spell at the Estadio El Toralín, including eight in the Copa del Rey.

After leaving for division-three team Real Oviedo on a two-year deal on 2 July 2013, Rodríguez continued competing at that tier for the vast majority of his career, representing in quick succession Sestao River Club, Marbella FC, Extremadura UD and Coruxo FC; he also played with CF Lorca Deportiva in the Tercera División.
