= Guzmán Casaseca =

Spanish footballer (born 1984)

Guzmán
Personal information
- Full name: Guzmán Casaseca Lozano
- Date of birth: 26 December 1984 (age 41)
- Place of birth: Badajoz, Spain
- Height: 1.79 m (5 ft 10 1/2 in)
- Position: Attacking midfielder

Youth career
- Badajoz

Senior career*
Years	Team	Apps	(Gls)
2002–2003	Badajoz B		
2003–2005	Badajoz	46	(7)
2005–2007	Mallorca B	14	(2)
2006	→ Xerez (loan)	12	(0)
2006–2007	→ Córdoba (loan)	35	(6)
2007–2009	Córdoba	42	(1)
2009–2010	Castellón	27	(3)
2010–2012	Ceuta	67	(23)
2012–2014	Alavés	66	(13)
2014–2015	Las Palmas	29	(3)
2015–2017	Valladolid	28	(3)
2017–2021	Badajoz	98	(14)
Total		464	(75)
- * Club domestic league appearances and goals

Guzmán Casaseca Lozano (born 26 December 1984), known simply as Guzmán, is a Spanish former professional footballer who played as an attacking midfielder.

== Club career ==
Born in Badajoz, Extremadura, Guzmán graduated from CD Badajoz's youth setup, and made his debut as a senior with the B team in 2002. He first appeared with the main squad on 15 December that year, coming on as a late substitute in a 1–1 home draw against SD Eibar in the Segunda División.

In January 2005, Guzmán moved to RCD Mallorca B of Segunda División B. After one season at Xerez CD in the second division, he was loaned to Córdoba CF on 7 July 2006, contributing seven goals to the latter club's promotion from division three – including one in the playoff final against SD Huesca – and signing a permanent contract shortly after.

Guzmán scored his first professional goal on 13 June 2009, his team's in a 3–1 away loss to Real Zaragoza. On 1 July, he joined CD Castellón also in the second tier on a two-year deal.

Guzmán signed with third-division AD Ceuta in 2010. After scoring 15 goals in 2011–12, he transferred to Deportivo Alavés in the same league. On 5 July 2014, he agreed to a two-year deal at UD Las Palmas.

On 16 July 2015, after achieving promotion to La Liga, Guzmán terminated his contract with the Canarian side. He joined Real Valladolid the next day.

Guzmán retired in July 2021 aged 36, being appointed assistant director of football of Badajoz. Across two spells at the Estadio Nuevo Vivero, he made 159 appearances and scored 22 goals.
