= Juan Góngora =

Spanish footballer

Personal information
- Full name: Juan Francisco Góngora Mateo
- Date of birth: 14 August 1988 (age 38)
- Place of birth: Fuengirola, Spain
- Height: 1.85 m (6 ft 1 in)
- Position: Left-back

Youth career
- Fuengirola
- 2006–2007: Betis

Senior career*
Years	Team	Apps	(Gls)
2007–2008	Betis C		
2008–2009	Marbella	33	(0)
2009–2010	Murcia B	32	(3)
2010–2011	Murcia	11	(0)
2011–2012	Cádiz	19	(0)
2012–2013	La Roda	31	(0)
2013–2014	Cultural Leonesa	35	(5)
2014–2018	UCAM Murcia	118	(17)
2018–2020	Unionistas	56	(9)
2020–2022	Talavera	56	(10)
2022–2024	Águilas	62	(16)
- * Club domestic league appearances and goals as of 5 May 2024

Juan Francisco Góngora Mateo (born 14 August 1988) is a Spanish footballer who plays as a left-back.

== Club career ==
Góngora was born in Fuengirola, Province of Málaga, Andalusia, and started his senior career with Real Betis' C team in the regional leagues. He moved straight to Segunda División B in 2008, joining Marbella FC.

In June 2009, Góngora signed with Real Murcia Imperial also in the third tier. On 30 July 2010, he was definitely promoted to first team, who had suffered relegation.

Góngora continued to compete in the third tier the following years, representing Cádiz CF, La Roda CF, Cultural y Deportiva Leonesa and UCAM Murcia CF. With the latter, he achieved promotion to Segunda División at the end of the 2015–16 season after scoring a career-best nine goals.

Góngora made his professional debut on 28 August 2016 at the age of 28, starting and opening a 1–1 home draw against Córdoba CF. On 21 September, he scored from a second-half penalty in the 4–0 win over UD Almería also at the Estadio de La Condomina.
