= César Muñiz Fernández =

Belgian-born Spanish football referee

- Full name: César Muñiz Fernández
- Born: 18 May 1970 (age 56); Brussels, Belgium
- Other occupation: Student

Domestic
Years	League	Role
1991—1994	Tercera	Referee
1994—1997	Segunda B	Referee
1997—2000	Segunda	Referee
2000—2014	La Liga	Referee

International
Years	League	Role
2007—2014	FIFA	Referee

César Muñiz Fernández (born 18 May 1970, in Anderlecht, Brussels) is a Belgian-born Spaniard retired association football referee who operates in the top league of Spanish football, La Liga. He has been a FIFA-listed referee since 2007.
