= Fernando Teixeira Vitienes =

Spanish football referee (born 1971)

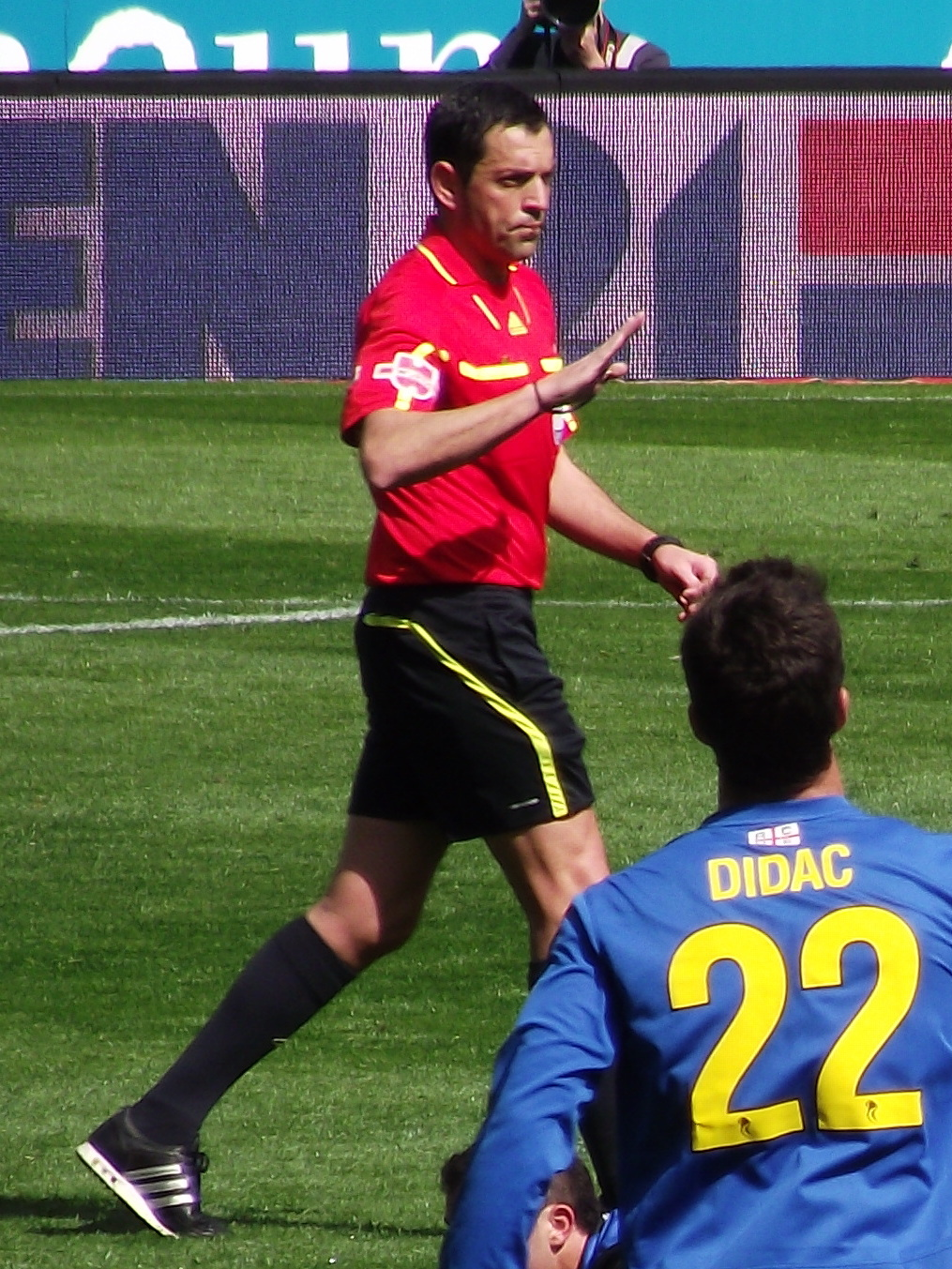
- Refereeing a RCD Espanyol vs Rayo Vallecano La Liga fixture on 11 March 2012
- Born: 28 July 1971 (age 55); Santander, Spain

Domestic
Years	League	Role
2003–2015	La Liga	Referee

International
Years	League	Role
2009–2014	FIFA listed	Referee

Fernando Teixeira Vitienes (born 28 July 1971), also referred to as Teixeira I, is a Spanish former football referee, affiliated to the Committee of Referees of Cantabria.

Born in Santander on 28 July 1971, he promoted to La Liga in the 2003–04 season. He held the rank of international referee from 2009 to 2014.

He refereed at 2012–13 UEFA Europa League.

Demoted from the top tier of Spanish football along his brother José Antonio Teixeira Vitienes, he retired after the 2014–15 La Liga season. His last game was at Campo de Fútbol de Vallecas, a 2–4 win of Real Sociedad against Rayo Vallecano played on 23 May 2015.
