= AD Ceuta =

Spanish football team (1996–2012)

Ceuta
- Full name: Asociación Deportiva Ceuta
- Founded: 1997
- Dissolved: 2012
- Ground: Alfonso Murube, Ceuta, Spain
- Capacity: 6,500
- 2011–12: 2ªB – Group 4, 14th
Home colours	Away colours	Third colours

Asociación Deportiva Ceuta was a Spanish football team based in the autonomous city of Ceuta. Founded in 1996, its last season was 2011–12 in Segunda División B, holding home matches at Estadio Alfonso Murube, with a capacity of 6,500.

== History ==
Agrupación Deportiva Ceuta, another team from the city, was founded in 1972 and folded in 1991. The club played once in the Segunda División, in 1980–81.

In 1997 Asociación Deportiva Ceuta was born, reaching the third level in only two years; in its first decades of existence, it appeared – without success – in five second division promotion play-offs.

On 1 July 2012, Ceuta was relegated to the Tercera División for unpaid wages to its players.

After 2011–12 season, the club was administratively relegated to Regional Preferente de Ceuta due to unpaid wages from the previous season. Shortly after, club was disbanded with a €600,000 total debt. In 2013, a new club called Agrupación Deportiva Ceuta Fútbol Club was founded to inherit the club's history.

=== Club background ===
- Asociación Deportiva Ceuta — (1997–2012)

==== Other clubs from Ceuta ====
- Ceuta Sport Club — (1932–56); renamed in 1941 to Sociedad Deportiva Ceuta
- Sociedad Deportiva Ceuta — (1941–56); in 1956 merged with the Spanish elements of Club Atlético Tetuán to form Club Atlético de Ceuta
- Club Atlético de Ceuta — (1956–); renamed in 2013 to Agrupación Deportiva Ceuta Fútbol Club
- Club Imperio de Ceuta Sociedad Deportiva — (1958–)
- Agrupación Deportiva Ceuta — (1969–91)
- Club Ceutí Atlético – (1996–97)
- Agrupación Deportiva Ceuta Fútbol Club — (2013–)

== Rivalry ==
The Ceuta-Melilla derby was between Ceuta and UD Melilla. The two clubs travelled to each other via the Spanish mainland to avoid entering Morocco.

== Season to season ==
Season	Tier	Division	Place	Copa del Rey
1996–97	4	3ª	1st	
1997–98	4	3ª	1st	
1998–99	3	2ª B	7th	Second round
1999–2000	3	2ª B	2nd	
2000–01	3	2ª B	4th	Round of 32
2001–02	3	2ª B	2nd	Round of 32
2002–03	3	2ª B	7th	Preliminary
2003–04	3	2ª B	6th	Round of 32

Season	Tier	Division	Place	Copa del Rey
2004–05	3	2ª B	3rd	Round of 32
2005–06	3	2ª B	10th	Second round
2006–07	3	2ª B	11th	
2007–08	3	2ª B	3rd	
2008–09	3	2ª B	7th	First round
2009–10	3	2ª B	5th	Second round
2010–11	3	2ª B	6th	Round of 32
2011–12	3	2ª B	14th	First round

- 14 seasons in Segunda División B
- 2 seasons in Tercera División

== Final squad ==
Note: Flags indicate national team as defined under FIFA eligibility rules; some limited exceptions apply. Players may hold more than one non-FIFA nationality.

No.	Pos.	Nation	Player
1	GK	ESP	David Relaño
2	DF	ESP	Xapi Arnau
3	DF	ESP	Cristian Valle
4	DF	ESP	Ale Hornillo
5	MF	ESP	Samu
6	MF	ESP	Juanjo Pereira
8	MF	ESP	Julio de Dios
9	FW	NGR	Elvis Onyema
10	FW	ESP	Añete

No.	Pos.	Nation	Player
11	DF	ESP	Andrés
13	GK	ESP	Julio
16	MF	ESP	Gerard
19	DF	ESP	Germán
20	MF	ESP	Aitor
21	DF	ESP	Álex Fernández
22	MF	ESP	Juanjo Alfaro
25	GK	ESP	Pau Torres

== See also ==
- AD Ceuta B, reserve team
