= 2012–13 Copa del Rey =

Copa del Rey
111th Copa del Rey

Tournament details
- Country: Spain
- Teams: 83

Final positions
- Champions: Atlético Madrid (10th title)
- Runners-up: Real Madrid

Tournament statistics
- Matches played: 112
- Goals scored: 288 (2.57 per match)
- Top goal scorer(s): Diego Costa (8 goals) (Note: The official match report of the final Archived 8 June 2013 at the Wayback Machine mistakenly awarded the goal to Arda Turan, instead of Diego Costa.)

The 2012–13 Copa del Rey was the 111th staging of the Copa del Rey (including two seasons where two rival editions were played). The competition began on 29 August 2012 and ended on 17 May 2013 with the final, held at the Santiago Bernabéu in Madrid, in which Atlético Madrid lifted the trophy for the tenth time in their history with a 2–1 victory over hosts Real Madrid in extra time. Barcelona were the defending champions but were eliminated by Real Madrid in the semi-finals. Going into the competition, the winners were assured of a place in the group stage of the 2013–14 UEFA Europa League, but both finalists had already qualified for the 2013–14 UEFA Champions League a few weeks before.

== Calendar and format ==
Round	Draw date	Date	Fixtures	Clubs	Notes
First round	3 August 2012	29–30 August 2012	18	83 → 65	Clubs participating in Tercera and Segunda División B gained entry. Seven teams from Segunda División B received a bye. Single match (without away goals rule)
Second round	3 August 2012	11–12 September 2012	22	65 → 43	Clubs participating in Segunda División gained entry. One team from first round received a bye. Teams from Segunda División faced each other. Single match (without away goals rule)
Third round	14 September 2012	17–18 October 2012	11	43 → 32	One team from Segunda División B or Tercera División, which previously didn't receive a bye, received one. Teams from Segunda División faced each other. Single match (without away goals rule)
Round of 32	18 October 2012	30–31 October; 1 November 2012	16	32 → 16	Clubs participating in La Liga gained entry. The seven teams from La Liga which were qualified for European competitions, faced against remaining seven teams from Segunda División B and Tercera División. The five remaining Segunda División teams faced against La Liga teams. The eight remaining La Liga teams faced each other.
Round of 32	18 October 2012	27–29 November 2012^{1}	16	32 → 16	Clubs participating in La Liga gained entry. The seven teams from La Liga which were qualified for European competitions, faced against remaining seven teams from Segunda División B and Tercera División. The five remaining Segunda División teams faced against La Liga teams. The eight remaining La Liga teams faced each other.
Round of 16	18 October 2012	11–13 December 2012^{1}	8	16 → 8	
Round of 16	18 October 2012	8–10 January 2013^{2}	8	16 → 8	
Quarter-finals	18 October 2012	15–17 January 2013^{2}	4	8 → 4	
Quarter-finals	18 October 2012	23–24 January 2013^{2}	4	8 → 4	
Semifinals	18 October 2012	30–31 January 2013^{2}	2	4 → 2	
Semifinals	18 October 2012	26–27 February 2013^{2}	2	4 → 2	
Final	18 October 2012	17 May 2013	1	2 → 1	

Notes

- Note 1: Match in second leg of Round of 32 between Athletic and Eibar and the involved knockout of Round of 16 were delayed one week later. After the reschedule by UEFA of Europa League match 'Kiryat Shmona v Athletic' to be played on 28 November, the RFEF changed date to 12 December, and the first leg of the involved fixture of Round of 16 was played one week later.
- Note 2: Originally was expected to celebrate the second leg of Round of 16 on 18–19 December, and next rounds from 9 to 30 January in mid-week until semi-finals, but according to the note 1 which always it would be one knockout delayed from others and the close celebration of league matchday (celebrated on 20–22 December, prior to Christmas holidays) it was postponed with agreement between clubs and television broadcasters to postpone the second leg of Round of 16 to 8–10 January and move next rounds one week later until 30 January and the celebration of second leg of semi-finals around 27 February 2013.

== Qualified teams ==
The following teams competed in the Copa del Rey 2012–13.

20 teams of 2011–12 La Liga:

- Athletic Bilbao
- Atlético Madrid
- Barcelona
- Betis
- Espanyol
- Getafe
- Granada
- Levante
- Málaga
- Mallorca
- Osasuna
- Racing Santander
- Rayo Vallecano
- Real Madrid
- Real Sociedad
- Sevilla
- Sporting Gijón
- Valencia
- Villarreal
- Zaragoza

20 teams of 2011–12 Segunda División (Barcelona B and Villarreal B are excluded for being reserve teams):

- Alcorcón
- Alcoyano
- Almería
- Celta Vigo
- Córdoba
- Deportivo La Coruña
- Elche
- Cartagena
- Gimnàstic
- Girona
- Guadalajara
- Hércules
- Huesca
- Las Palmas
- Murcia
- Numancia
- Recreativo
- Sabadell
- Valladolid
- Xerez

25 teams of 2011–12 Segunda División B. Teams that qualified are the top five teams of each of the 4 groups (excluding reserve teams) and the five with the highest number of points out of the remaining non-reserve teams (*):

- Tenerife
- Lugo
- Albacete
- Real Oviedo
- La Roda
- Mirandés
- Ponferradina
- Eibar
- Amorebieta
- UD Logroñés
- Atlético Baleares
- Orihuela
- Huracán Valencia
- Badalona
- Llagostera
- Cádiz
- Balompédica Linense
- Lucena
- Real Jaén
- Melilla
- San Roque*
- L'Hospitalet*
- Alavés*
- Lleida Esportiu*
- Cacereño*

18 teams of 2011–12 Tercera División. Teams that qualified are the champions of each of the 18 groups (or at least the ones with the highest number of points within their group since reserve teams are excluded):

- Ourense
- Caudal de Mieres
- Noja
- Laudio
- Prat
- Catarroja
- Fuenlabrada
- Real Ávila
- Loja
- Atlético Sanluqueño
- Constància
- Marino de Los Cristianos
- Yeclano
- Arroyo
- Peña Sport
- SD Logroñés
- Ejea
- Villarrobledo

== First round ==
The draw for First and Second round was held on 3 August 2012 at 13:00 CEST in La Ciudad del Fútbol, RFEF headquarters, in Las Rozas, Madrid. In this round gained entry 36 Segunda División B and Tercera División teams. The matches were played on 29–30 August 2012.

Balompédica Linense, Real Jaén, Melilla, Huracán Valencia, Lucena, Tenerife and Lleida Esportiu received a bye.

29 August 2012	Noja	3–2 (a.e.t.)	Amorebieta	Noja (Cantabria)
18:30 CEST	Bustillo 49'; Riki 83'; Gerardo 119'	Report	3' Gabilondo; 27' Urko	Stadium: La Caseta; Attendance: 400; Referee: Germán Cid Camacho

29 August 2012	L'Hospitalet	1–0	Orihuela	L'Hospitalet de Llobregat (Barcelona)
19:00 CEST	Belmar 59' (o.g.)	Report		Stadium: La Feixa Llarga; Attendance: 250; Referee: Sebastián Ripoll Solano

29 August 2012	Caudal de Mieres	2–0	Marino de Los Cristianos	Mieres (Asturias)
19:30 CEST	Rojas 44' (pen.); Navarro 65'	Report		Stadium: Hermanos Antuña; Attendance: 500; Referee: Ander Zarrabeitia Arrieta

29 August 2012	Prat	2–1	Gimnàstic	El Prat de Llobregat (Barcelona)
19:30 CEST	Sierra 84', 90'	Report	Viale 79'	Stadium: Sagnier; Attendance: 700; Referee: Ángel Enrique Sanz Terrades

29 August 2012	SD Logroñés	2–1	UD Logroñés	Logroño
20:00 CEST	Olavarrieta 14'; Torres 76'	Report	Suárez 61'	Stadium: Nuevo Las Gaunas; Attendance: 2,500; Referee: Luis Miguel Vallejo Aznar

29 August 2012	Laudio	0–1	Eibar	Laudio-Llodio (Álava)
20:00 CEST		Report	Arroyo 23'	Stadium: Ellakuri; Attendance: 250; Referee: Julio Fermín Leo Ollo

29 August 2012	Ejea	4–2 (a.e.t.)	Peña Sport	Ejea de los Caballeros (Zaragoza)
20:00 CEST	Gallego 59' (pen.), 95'; Bezdun 84'; Gracia 117'	Report	Uriz 4'; Rodrigo 49'	Stadium: Luchán; Attendance: 1,000; Referee: Ángel Hernández Lorenzo

29 August 2012	Alcoyano	2–0	Atlético Baleares	Alcoi (Alicante)
20:00 CEST	Torres 22'; Tortosa 63'	Report		Stadium: El Collao; Attendance: 1,000; Referee: Alfonso Melgares De Aguilar Fernández

29 August 2012	Llagostera	1–0	Badalona	Llagostera (Girona)
20:00 CEST	Nico Rubio 71'	Report		Stadium: Municipal de Llagostera; Attendance: 450; Referee: Óscar Herrero Arenas

29 August 2012	Albacete	4–0	Loja	Albacete
20:00 CEST	Molina 35' (pen.); Granell 46'; Alba 57'; Diop 63'	Report		Stadium: Carlos Belmonte; Attendance: 1,500; Referee: Enrique Ortiz Blanco

29 August 2012	Catarroja	0–2	Alavés	Catarroja (Valencia)
20:00 CEST		Report	Salcedo 49'; Viguera 64'	Stadium: Mundial 82; Attendance: 800; Referee: Gustavo Rebollo López

29 August 2012	Ourense	2–1	Real Ávila	Ourense
20:30 CEST	Iván González 49'; Jona 77'	Report	Ruiz 35'	Stadium: O Couto; Attendance: 1,600; Referee: Julián García García

29 August 2012	Constància	3–0	Yeclano	Inca (Balearic Islands)
20:30 CEST	Bosch 25', 41'; Vilaboa 65'	Report		Stadium: Nou Camp; Attendance: 800; Referee: José Antonio Salas Montoro

29 August 2012	Cádiz	3–2	San Roque	Cádiz
20:30 CEST	Gallardo 87'; Pablo Sánchez 88'; Garrido 90+1'	Report	Mustafa 32'; Agudo 75'	Stadium: Ramón de Carranza; Attendance: 5,000; Referee: Jesús Muñoz Mayordomo

29 August 2012	Arroyo	2–1 (a.e.t.)	La Roda	Arroyo de la Luz (Cáceres)
20:30 CEST	Espadas 12'; Andújar 95'	Report	Pelegrina 40'	Stadium: Municipal de Arroyo; Attendance: 600; Referee: Antonio Santos Pargaña

29 August 2012	Villarrobledo	1–3	Cacereño	Villarrobledo (Albacete)
20:30 CEST	Espinosa 64'	Report	Llerena 10'; Jaraíz 51'; Amaro 86'	Stadium: Nuestra Señora de la Caridad; Attendance: 700; Referee: Miguel Sánchez-seco Otero

30 August 2012	Real Oviedo	2–0	Fuenlabrada	Oviedo
20:30 CEST	Owona 3'; Casares 73'	Report		Stadium: Nuevo Carlos Tartiere; Attendance: 6,100; Referee: José Luis Corral García

30 August 2012	Atlético Sanluqueño	1–0	Cartagena	Sanlúcar de Barrameda (Cádiz)
21:30 CEST	Kike Márquez 85' (pen.)	Report		Stadium: El Palmar; Attendance: 2,000; Referee: Andrés Manuel Ceballos Silva

== Second round ==
In this round gained entry all Segunda División teams. The matches were played on 11–12 September 2012.

Cacereño received a bye.

11 September 2012	Sabadell	2–0	Hércules	Sabadell (Barcelona)
12:00 CEST	Dávila 34'; Hidalgo 57'	Report		Stadium: Nova Creu Alta; Attendance: 2,413; Referee: Francisco Manuel Arias López

11 September 2012	Almería	2–0	Murcia	Almería
21:30 CEST	Ulloa 77'; Aaron 84'	Report		Stadium: Juegos del Mediterráneo; Attendance: 4,000; Referee: José Luis Lesma López

11 September 2012	Mirandés	2–0	Recreativo	Miranda de Ebro (Burgos)
21:30 CEST	Rayco 1'; Soria 77'	Report		Stadium: Anduva; Attendance: 4,197; Referee: Daniel Ocón Arráiz

11 September 2012	Alcorcón	4–1	Numancia	Alcorcón (Madrid)
21:30 CEST	Quini 7', 21'; Miguélez 56'; Juli 79'	Report	Airam 29'	Stadium: Santo Domingo; Attendance: 1,500; Referee: Juan Martínez Munuera

12 September 2012	L'Hospitalet	1–1 (a.e.t.) (3–4 p)	Noja	L'Hospitalet de Llobregat (Barcelona)
19:30 CEST	Bilbao 54'	Report	Riki 77'	Stadium: La Feixa Llarga; Attendance: 180; Referee: Santiago Varón Aceitón
	Penalties
	Osado (penalty scored); Pedraza (penalty scored); Rico (penalty missed); Bakari (penalty scored); Manga (penalty missed)		(penalty scored) Riki; (penalty missed) Fresno; (penalty scored) Luisma; (penalty scored) Gerardo; (penalty scored) Josu

12 September 2012	Huracán Valencia	1–1 (a.e.t.) (4–2 p)	Albacete	Manises (Valencia)
19:30 CEST	Carreño 108'	Report	Santamaría 114'	Stadium: Municipal Vicente Martínez Catalá; Attendance: 700; Referee: Francisco Alejandro Navarro Fuentes
	Penalties
	Amarilla (penalty scored); Javi Rubio (penalty scored); Carreño (penalty scored); Capdevila (penalty scored)		(penalty scored) Sergio Molina; (penalty scored) Rocha; (penalty missed) Zurdo; (penalty missed) Santamaría

12 September 2012	Alavés	2–1	Atlético Sanluqueño	Vitoria-Gasteiz
20:00 CEST	Asier 3'; Jonan 76'	Report	Espinar 22'	Stadium: Mendizorroza; Attendance: 6,581; Referee: Sergio Usón Rosel

12 September 2012	Llagostera	1–0	Ejea	Llagostera (Girona)
20:00 CEST	Sellarés 31'	Report		Stadium: Municipal de Llagostera; Attendance: 300; Referee: Francisco Javier Barberá Fuentes

12 September 2012	Córdoba	1–0 (a.e.t.)	Elche	Córdoba
20:00 CEST	Cristian 102'	Report		Stadium: Nuevo Arcángel; Attendance: 9,301; Referee: José Ramón Piñeiro Crespo

12 September 2012	Constància	1–1 (a.e.t.) (3–1 p)	Ourense	Inca (Balearic Islands)
20:30 CEST	Mateu 63' (pen.)	Report	Jona 55'	Stadium: Nou Camp; Attendance: 500; Referee: Francisco Javier Fernández Vidal
	Penalties
	Ismael (penalty scored); Jaime (penalty scored); Mateu (penalty missed); Cristian (penalty scored)		(penalty scored) Claudio; (penalty missed) Pablo; (penalty missed) Campillo; (penalty missed) Iván González

12 September 2012	Lleida Esportiu	0–2	Eibar	Lleida
20:30 CEST		Report	Arruabarrena 22', 81'	Stadium: Camp d'Esports; Attendance: 500; Referee: Víctor Rives Leal

12 September 2012	Real Oviedo	0–0 (a.e.t.) (4–5 p)	Prat	Oviedo
20:30 CEST		Report		Stadium: Nuevo Carlos Tartiere; Attendance: 6,125; Referee: Alberto Fuente Martín
	Penalties
	Baquero (penalty scored); Busto (penalty missed); Cervero (penalty scored); Sanz (penalty missed); Cerrajería (penalty scored); Mantovani (penalty scored); Cantero (penalty missed); David Fernández (penalty missed)		(penalty scored) Bea; (penalty missed) Charly; (penalty scored) Cazorla; (penalty scored) Fernando; (penalty missed) Alcaraz; (penalty scored) Vila; (penalty missed) Ricarte; (penalty scored) Sierra

12 September 2012	Alcoyano	1–0	Tenerife	Alcoi (Alicante)
20:45 CEST	Lara 50'	Report		Stadium: El Collao; Attendance: 1,194; Referee: Valentín Pizarro Gómez

12 September 2012	Lucena	4–1	SD Logroñés	Lucena (Córdoba)
21:00 CEST	Adri 2', 60'; Lanza 35'; Fernando 41'	Report	Metola 68'	Stadium: Ciudad Deportiva; Attendance: 1,000; Referee: Carlos Moreno Hidalgo

12 September 2012	Cádiz	1–2	Arroyo	Cádiz
21:00 CEST	Pablo Sánchez 64' (pen.)	Report	Toni 7'; Iban Espadas 61'	Stadium: Ramón de Carranza; Attendance: 5,513; Referee: Ramón Arias Madrid

12 September 2012	Balompédica Linense	2–2 (a.e.t.) (5–6 p)	Melilla	La Línea de la Concepción (Cádiz)
21:00 CEST	Cuesta 60'; Curro 66'	Report	Chota 70', 90'	Stadium: Municipal de La Línea; Attendance: 1,500; Referee: Carlos López López
	Penalties
	Copi (penalty scored); Ocaña (penalty scored); Guerra (penalty scored); Bello (penalty scored); Ayala (penalty missed); Ismael (penalty scored); Mario (penalty missed)		(penalty scored) Domenech; (penalty missed) Velasco; (penalty scored) Díaz; (penalty scored) Chota; (penalty scored) Jairo; (penalty scored) Mahanan; (penalty scored) Aznar

12 September 2012	Sporting Gijón	2–0	Girona	Gijón
21:00 CEST	Cases 41'; Trejo 44'	Report		Stadium: El Molinón; Attendance: 10,500; Referee: Eduardo Prieto Iglesias

12 September 2012	Huesca	2–1	Guadalajara	Huesca
21:00 CEST	Camacho 37'; Jokin 49'	Report	Ortiz 35'	Stadium: El Alcoraz; Attendance: 2,400; Referee: Fernando López Acera

12 September 2012	Lugo	0–1	Racing Santander	Lugo
21:00 CEST		Report	Kaluđerović 15'	Stadium: Anxo Carro; Attendance: 3,000; Referee: Pablo González Fuertes

12 September 2012	Xerez	0–1	Las Palmas	Jerez de la Frontera (Cádiz)
21:00 CEST		Report	Vicente Gómez 44'	Stadium: Chapín; Attendance: 3,145; Referee: David Pérez Pallas

12 September 2012	Real Jaén	2–0	Caudal de Mieres	Jaén
21:30 CEST	Villa 53'; Cobo 63'	Report		Stadium: Nuevo La Victoria; Attendance: 3,000; Referee: Álvaro Moreno Aragón

12 September 2012	Villarreal	0–2	Ponferradina	Vila-real (Castellón)
22:00 CEST		Report	Lafuente 56'; Wellington 89'	Stadium: El Madrigal; Attendance: 5,500; Referee: Alfonso Pino Zamorano

== Third round ==
The draw was held on 14 September 2012 at 13:00 CEST in La Ciudad del Fútbol. The matches were played on 17–18 October 2012.

Alcoyano received a bye.

17 October 2012	Noja	0–1	Real Jaén	Noja (Cantabria)
19:30 CEST		Report	Machado 25'	Stadium: La Caseta; Attendance: 400; Referee: Gorka Sagués Oscoz

17 October 2012	Huracán Valencia	1–2 (a.e.t.)	Alavés	Manises (Valencia)
20:00 CEST	Navarro 72'	Report	Juanma 40'; Viguera 104'	Stadium: Municipal Vicente Martínez Catalá; Attendance: 2,000; Referee: Israel Simón Del Pino

17 October 2012	Eibar	1–0 (a.e.t.)	Arroyo	Eibar (Gipuzkoa)
20:00 CEST	Jito 110'	Report		Stadium: Ipurua; Attendance: 2,023; Referee: Eduardo García Ballesteros

17 October 2012	Constància	1–1 (a.e.t.) (7–8 p)	Melilla	Inca (Balearic Islands)
20:30 CEST	Mateu 25'	Report	Velasco 37'	Stadium: Nou Camp; Attendance: 3,000; Referee: Vicente Gil Coscolla
	Penalties
	Ismael (penalty scored); Jaime (penalty scored); Miguel Bosch (penalty scored); Mateu (penalty missed); Cristian (penalty scored); Fullana (penalty scored); Pau Siquier (penalty scored); Biel Guasp (penalty scored); Víctor (penalty missed)		(penalty scored) Jiménez; (penalty scored) Díaz; (penalty scored) Mahanan; (penalty scored) Jairo; (penalty missed) Aznar; (penalty scored) Chota; (penalty scored) Fausto; (penalty scored) Sánchez; (penalty scored) Fragoso

17 October 2012	Prat	2–3 (a.e.t.)	Llagostera	El Prat de Llobregat (Barcelona)
20:45 CEST	Vila 19'; Murillo 95'	Report	Planagumá 75'; Pitu 99' (pen.), 113'	Stadium: Sagnier; Attendance: 2,100; Referee: Vicente Pintado Calero

17 October 2012	Lucena	1–3	Cacereño	Lucena (Córdoba)
21:00 CEST	Obregón 90+3'	Report	Gavilán 6' (o.g.); Saad 35'; Amaro 90+1' (pen.)	Stadium: Ciudad Deportiva; Attendance: 2,000; Referee: Francisco Javier Villena Contreras

17 October 2012	Almería	3–0	Alcorcón	Almería
21:00 CEST	Vidal 23'; Ulloa 41'; Abel 62'	Report		Stadium: Juegos del Mediterráneo; Attendance: 1,976; Referee: Santiago Jaime Latre

17 October 2012	Sabadell	0–1 (a.e.t.)	Córdoba	Sabadell (Barcelona)
21:00 CEST		Report	Pablo Ruiz 98' (o.g.)	Stadium: Nova Creu Alta; Attendance: 3,089; Referee: Dámaso Arcediano Monescillo

17 October 2012	Huesca	1–1 (a.e.t.) (3–4 p)	Ponferradina	Huesca
21:00 CEST	Vázquez 95'	Report	Lafuente 91'	Stadium: El Alcoraz; Attendance: 4,000; Referee: Mario Melero López
	Penalties
	Camacho (penalty scored); Vázquez (penalty scored); Jokin (penalty missed); Helguera (penalty missed); Sorribas (penalty scored)		(penalty missed) Isaías; (penalty scored) Adán; (penalty scored) Samuel; (penalty scored) Yuri; (penalty scored) Vera

17 October 2012	Sporting Gijón	2–1	Mirandés	Gijón
21:00 CEST	Sangoy 74', 85'	Report	Díaz de Cerio 22'	Stadium: El Molinón; Attendance: 7,700; Referee: Iñaki Vicandi Garrido

18 October 2012	Las Palmas	4–2 (a.e.t.)	Racing Santander	Las Palmas de Gran Canaria
20:00 WEST	Guerrero 29'; Momo 90+3' (pen.); Murillo 105'; Bifouma 112'	Report	Kaluđerović 2'; Bouazza 85'	Stadium: Gran Canaria; Attendance: 3,360; Referee: Pedro Sureda Cuenca

== Final phase ==
The draw for the Round of 32, Round of 16, Quarter-finals and Semi-finals was held on 18 October 2012 at 12:00 CEST in La Ciudad del Fútbol in Las Rozas, Madrid. In this round, all La Liga teams entered the competition.

Like previous years, Round of 32 pairings was as follows: the seven remaining teams participating in Segunda División B and Tercera División were drawn against the La Liga teams which qualified for European competitions, this is: four teams from Pot 1 (Segunda B) were drawn against four teams from pot 2a (champions) and the three remaining teams in pot 1 were drawn in the same way with the pot 2b teams (Europa League). The five teams in Pot 3 (Segunda División) were drawn against five teams of the thirteen remaining teams of La Liga (Pot 4). The remaining eight teams of La Liga faced each other. Matches involving teams with different league tiers played at home on the first leg the team in lower tier, in the other matches the first team to come out of the draw played at home. This rule was also applied in Round of 16, but not for Quarter-finals and Semi-finals, which order of legs was pure as of the order of draw.

At the time of the draw, the result of the match between Las Palmas and Racing de Santander (which was played later that day) was not known.

Pot 1 (Segunda División B)	Pot 2a (champions League)	Pot 2b (Europa League)	Pot 3 (Segunda División)	Pot 4 (rest of Primera División)
Alavés; Alcoyano; Cacereño; Eibar; Real Jaén; Llagostera; Melilla	Barcelona (TH); Real Madrid; Valencia; Málaga	Atlético Madrid; Levante; Athletic Bilbao	Almería; Córdoba; Las Palmas; Ponferradina; Sporting Gijón	Betis; Celta Vigo; Deportivo La Coruña; Espanyol; Getafe; Granada; Mallorca; Osasuna; Rayo Vallecano; Real Sociedad; Sevilla; Valladolid; Zaragoza

=== Bracket ===
Round of 32; 30/31 October, 1 November 2012; 27/28/29 November 2012^{1}
Almería	2	0	2
Celta Vigo (a.e.t.)	0	3	3
Alcoyano	1	0	1
Real Madrid	4	3	7
Sporting Gijón	1	0	1
Osasuna	0	2	2
Llagostera	0	1	1
Valencia	2	3	5
Córdoba	2	2	4
Real Sociedad	0	2	2
Alavés	0	1	1
Barcelona	3	3	6
Eibar (a)	0	1	1
Athletic Bilbao	0	1	1
Cacereño	3	1	4
Málaga (a)	4	0	4
Real Jaén	0	0	0
Atlético Madrid	3	1	4
Ponferradina	0	0	0
Getafe	4	0	4
Las Palmas	1	0	1
Rayo Vallecano	0	0	0
Valladolid	1	0	1
Betis	0	3	3
Melilla	1	1	2
Levante	0	4	4
Zaragoza (a)	1	1	2
Granada	0	2	2
Deportivo La Coruña	1	0	1
Mallorca (a)	1	0	1
Sevilla	3	3	6
Espanyol	1	0	1

Round of 16; 11/12/13 December 2012^{1} 8/9/10 January 2013^{2}
Celta Vigo	2	0	2
Real Madrid	1	4	5
Osasuna	0	1	1
Valencia	2	2	4
Córdoba	0	0	0
Barcelona	2	5	7
Eibar	1	1	2
Málaga	1	4	5
Atlético Madrid	3	0	3
Getafe	0	0	0
Las Palmas	1	0	1
Betis	1	1	2
Levante	0	0	0
Zaragoza	1	2	3
Mallorca	0	2	2
Sevilla	5	1	6

Quarter-finals; 15/16/17 January 2013^{2} 23/24 January 2013^{2}
Real Madrid	2	1	3
Valencia	0	1	1
Barcelona	2	4	6
Málaga	2	2	4
Atlético Madrid	2	1	3
Betis	0	1	1
Zaragoza	0	0	0
Sevilla	0	4	4

Semi-finals; 30/31 January 2013^{2} 26/27 February 2013^{2}
Real Madrid	1	3	4
Barcelona	1	1	2
Atlético Madrid	2	2	4
Sevilla	1	2	3

Final; 17 May 2013
Real Madrid	1
Atlético Madrid (a.e.t.)	2

== Round of 32 ==
The first leg matches were played between 30 October and 1 November 2012. The second legs were played between 27 and 29 November 2012, except Athletic Bilbao–Eibar on 12 December 2012.

Team 1	Agg.	Team 2	1st leg	2nd leg
Alcoyano	1–7	Real Madrid	1–4	0–3
Llagostera	1–5	Valencia	0–2	1–3
Cacereño	4–4 (a)	Málaga	3–4	1–0
Alavés	1–6	Barcelona	0–3	1–3
Eibar	1–1 (a)	Athletic Bilbao	0–0	1–1
Real Jaén	0–4	Atlético Madrid	0–3	0–1
Melilla	2–4	Levante	1–0	1–4
Las Palmas	1–0	Rayo Vallecano	1–0	0–0
Sporting Gijón	1–2	Osasuna	1–0	0–2
Almería	2–3 (a.e.t.)	Celta Vigo	2–0	0–3
Córdoba	4–2	Real Sociedad	2–0	2–2
Ponferradina	0–4	Getafe	0–4	0–0
Valladolid	0–3	Betis	1–0	0–3
Deportivo La Coruña	1–1 (a)	Mallorca	1–1	0–0
Zaragoza	2–2 (a)	Granada	1–0	1–2
Sevilla	6–1	Espanyol	3–1	3–0

=== First leg ===
30 October 2012	Llagostera	0–2	Valencia	Llagostera (Girona)
20:00 CET		Report	Jonas 45+1'; Valdez 68'	Stadium: Municipal de Llagostera; Attendance: 2,500; Referee: Jesús Gil Manzano

30 October 2012	Alavés	0–3	Barcelona	Vitoria-Gasteiz
22:00 CET		Report	Villa 40'; Iniesta 51'; Fàbregas 88'	Stadium: Mendizorrotza; Attendance: 19,840; Referee: José Antonio Teixeira Vitienes

31 October 2012	Cacereño	3–4	Málaga	Cáceres
20:00 CET	Jaraíz 36'; Chapi 42'; Carlos Esteve 87'	Report	Onyewu 7'; Santa Cruz 20', 71'; Duda 59'	Stadium: Príncipe Felipe; Attendance: 7,000; Referee: Antonio Mateu Lahoz

31 October 2012	Real Jaén	0–3	Atlético Madrid	Jaén
20:00 CET		Report	Costa 27' (pen.); Adrián 62'; García 90+3'	Stadium: Nuevo La Victoria; Attendance: 17,000; Referee: Carlos Delgado Ferreiro

31 October 2012	Almería	2–0	Celta Vigo	Almería
20:00 CET	Zongo 53'; Abel 87'	Report		Stadium: Juegos del Mediterráneo; Attendance: 2,487; Referee: Alejandro José Hernández Hernández

31 October 2012	Zaragoza	1–0	Granada	Zaragoza
20:00 CET	Aranda 79'	Report		Stadium: La Romareda; Attendance: 11,000; Referee: Alfonso Álvarez Izquierdo

31 October 2012	Las Palmas	1–0	Rayo Vallecano	Las Palmas de Gran Canaria
20:00 WET	Bifouma 21'	Report		Stadium: Gran Canaria; Attendance: 8,875; Referee: Pedro Jesús Pérez Montero

31 October 2012	Alcoyano	1–4	Real Madrid	Alcoi (Alicante)
22:00 CET	Javi Lara 77'	Report	Benzema 21', 88'; Kaká 35'; José Rodríguez 67'	Stadium: El Collao; Attendance: 6,500; Referee: Fernando Teixeira Vitienes

1 November 2012	Eibar	0–0	Athletic Bilbao	Eibar (Gipuzkoa)
12:00 CET		Report		Stadium: Ipurua; Attendance: 3,859; Referee: José Luis Paradas Romero

1 November 2012	Valladolid	1–0	Betis	Valladolid
17:00 CET	Bueno 39'	Report		Stadium: Nuevo José Zorrilla; Attendance: 11,674; Referee: Xavier Estrada Fernández

1 November 2012	Melilla	1–0	Levante	Melilla
18:00 CET	Velasco 39' (pen.)	Report		Stadium: Álvarez Claro; Attendance: 3,500; Referee: Carlos del Cerro Grande

1 November 2012	Sporting Gijón	1–0	Osasuna	Gijón
19:00 CET	Sangoy 13'	Report		Stadium: El Molinón; Attendance: 9,100; Referee: Ignacio Iglesias Villanueva

1 November 2012	Córdoba	2–0	Real Sociedad	Córdoba
19:00 CET	Patiño 42'; Rennella 77' (pen.)	Report		Stadium: Nuevo Arcángel; Attendance: 15,790; Referee: José Luis González González

1 November 2012	Ponferradina	0–4	Getafe	Ponferrada (León)
19:00 CET		Report	Gavilán 12', 64'; Lafita 44'; Alcácer 68'	Stadium: El Toralín; Attendance: 5,500; Referee: César Muñiz Fernández

1 November 2012	Sevilla	3–1	Espanyol	Seville
19:00 CET	Fazio 3'; Cala 82'; Negredo 89' (pen.)	Report	Alfonso 68'	Stadium: Ramón Sánchez Pizjuán; Attendance: 25,000; Referee: Miguel Ángel Pérez Lasa

1 November 2012	Deportivo La Coruña	1–1	Mallorca	A Coruña
21:00 CET	Manuel Pablo 54'	Report	Geromel 70'	Stadium: Riazor; Attendance: 17,000; Referee: Miguel Ángel Ayza Gámez

=== Second leg ===
27 November 2012	Rayo Vallecano	0–0 (0–1 agg.)	Las Palmas	Madrid
19:30 CET		Report		Stadium: Vallecas; Attendance: 6,300; Referee: Miguel Ángel Pérez Lasa

27 November 2012	Osasuna	2–0 (2–1 agg.)	Sporting Gijón	Pamplona
19:30 CET	Llorente 69'; Rubén 75'	Report		Stadium: El Sadar; Attendance: 11,109; Referee: Fernando Teixeira Vitienes

27 November 2012	Real Sociedad	2–2 (2–4 agg.)	Córdoba	Donostia
19:30 CET	Griezmann 21'; Agirretxe 85'	Report	Patiño 65'; Dubarbier 72'	Stadium: Anoeta; Attendance: 16,918; Referee: Miguel Ángel Ayza Gámez

27 November 2012	Betis	3–0 (3–1 agg.)	Valladolid	Seville
19:30 CET	Amaya 26'; Castro 61'; Rueda 86' (o.g.)	Report		Stadium: Benito Villamarín; Attendance: 27,789; Referee: Alfonso Álvarez Izquierdo

27 November 2012	Real Madrid	3–0 (7–1 agg.)	Alcoyano	Madrid
21:30 CET	Di María 71'; Callejón 88', 89'	Report		Stadium: Santiago Bernabéu; Attendance: 35,000; Referee: Ignacio Iglesias Villanueva

27 November 2012	Málaga	0–1 (4a–4 agg.)	Cacereño	Málaga
21:30 CET		Report	Chapi 36'	Stadium: La Rosaleda; Attendance: 10,000; Referee: Carlos del Cerro Grande

28 November 2012	Valencia	3–1 (5–1 agg.)	Llagostera	Valencia
19:30 CET	Rami 15'; Valdez 57'; Bernat 78'	Report	Rubio 83'	Stadium: Mestalla; Attendance: 8,000; Referee: José Antonio Teixeira Vitienes

28 November 2012	Atlético Madrid	1–0 (4–0 agg.)	Real Jaén	Madrid
19:30 CET	García 15'	Report		Stadium: Vicente Calderón; Attendance: 7,000; Referee: César Muñiz Fernández

28 November 2012	Levante	4–1 (4–2 agg.)	Melilla	Valencia
19:30 CET	Karabelas 25'; Roger 62'; Míchel 76'; Iborra 85' (pen.)	Report	Chota 27'	Stadium: Ciutat de València; Attendance: 11,197; Referee: José Luis González González

28 November 2012	Getafe	0–0 (4–0 agg.)	Ponferradina	Getafe (Madrid)
19:30 CET		Report		Stadium: Coliseum Alfonso Pérez; Attendance: 2,000; Referee: Pedro Jesús Pérez Montero

28 November 2012	Barcelona	3–1 (6–1 agg.)	Alavés	Barcelona
21:30 CET	Adriano 35'; Villa 55', 59'	Report	Viguera 17'	Stadium: Camp Nou; Attendance: 57,655; Referee: Carlos Velasco Carballo

28 November 2012	Espanyol	0–3 (1–6 agg.)	Sevilla	Cornellà de Llobregat (Barcelona)
21:30 CET		Report	Perotti 26' (pen.); Rakitić 44'; Diawara 49'	Stadium: Cornellà-El Prat; Attendance: 7,463; Referee: Carlos Clos Gómez

29 November 2012	Celta Vigo	3–0 (a.e.t.) (3–2 agg.)	Almería	Vigo (Pontevedra)
19:30 CET	Park 54'; Lago 89'; De Lucas 109'	Report		Stadium: Balaídos; Attendance: 10,541; Referee: Alberto Undiano Mallenco

29 November 2012	Granada	2–1 (2–2a agg.)	Zaragoza	Granada
19:30 CET	Ighalo 27'; Mainz 65'	Report	José Mari 55'	Stadium: Nuevo Los Cármenes; Attendance: 21,000; Referee: Jesús Gil Manzano

29 November 2012	Mallorca	0–0 (1a–1 agg.)	Deportivo La Coruña	Palma
21:30 CET		Report		Stadium: Iberostar Stadium; Attendance: 5,270; Referee: Xavier Estrada Fernández

12 December 2012	Athletic Bilbao	1–1 (1–1a agg.)	Eibar	Bilbao
20:00 CET	Aduriz 89'	Report	Arruabarrena 72' (pen.)	Stadium: San Mamés; Attendance: 25,000; Referee: Carlos Velasco Carballo
Note: The match was original scheduled to play on 28 November 19:30. It was postponed after the reschedule by UEFA of Europa League match in Haifa on this day, the RFEF changed date to 12 December, then the fixture of Round of 16 which will play the winner of this knockout will be delayed one week later.

== Round of 16 ==
The first leg matches were played on 11–13 December 2012, except the Eibar–Málaga match, which was played on 18 December 2012. The second leg were played on 8–10 January 2013. The order of legs were changed in knockouts between teams from different levels, the lower league team playing at home in the first leg, as was the case in the knockout FC Barcelona v Córdoba CF.

Team 1	Agg.	Team 2	1st leg	2nd leg
Las Palmas	1–2	Betis	1–1	0–1
Levante	0–3	Zaragoza	0–1	0–2
Mallorca	2–6	Sevilla	0–5	2–1
Osasuna	1–4	Valencia	0–2	1–2
Eibar	2–5	Málaga	1–1	1–4
Atlético Madrid	3–0	Getafe	3–0	0–0
Córdoba	0–7	Barcelona	0–2	0–5
Celta Vigo	2–5	Real Madrid	2–1	0–4

=== First leg ===
11 December 2012	Osasuna	0–2	Valencia	Pamplona
20:00 CET		Report	Parejo 48'; Soldado 90+3'	Stadium: El Sadar; Attendance: 10,855; Referee: Miguel Ángel Pérez Lasa

12 December 2012	Mallorca	0–5	Sevilla	Palma
20:00 CET		Report	Negredo 13', 18'; Medel 25'; Botía 47'; Luna 85'	Stadium: Iberostar Stadium; Attendance: 4,330; Referee: Carlos Clos Gómez

12 December 2012	Córdoba	0–2	Barcelona	Córdoba
20:00 CET		Report	Messi 11', 74'	Stadium: Nuevo Arcángel; Attendance: 20,000; Referee: Carlos del Cerro Grande

12 December 2012	Atlético Madrid	3–0	Getafe	Madrid
22:00 CET	Costa 19' (pen.), 87'; Filipe Luís 80'	Report		Stadium: Vicente Calderón; Attendance: 7,000; Referee: Antonio Mateu Lahoz

12 December 2012	Celta Vigo	2–1	Real Madrid	Vigo (Pontevedra)
22:00 CET	Bermejo 56'; Bustos 78'	Report	Ronaldo 87'	Stadium: Balaídos; Attendance: 27,988; Referee: Alfonso Álvarez Izquierdo

13 December 2012	Levante	0–1	Zaragoza	Valencia
20:00 CET		Report	Aranda 90+1'	Stadium: Ciutat de València; Attendance: 10,862; Referee: Pedro Jesús Pérez Montero

13 December 2012	Las Palmas	1–1	Betis	Las Palmas de Gran Canaria
21:00 WET	Chrisantus 84'	Report	Castro 66'	Stadium: Gran Canaria; Attendance: 14,640; Referee: Carlos Delgado Ferreiro

18 December 2012	Eibar	1–1	Málaga	Eibar (Gipuzkoa)
20:00 CET	Añibarro 73'	Report	Onyewu 90'	Stadium: Ipurua; Attendance: 4,273; Referee: José Antonio Teixeira Vitienes

=== Second leg ===
8 January 2013	Málaga	4–1 (5–2 agg.)	Eibar	Málaga
19:30 CET	Buonanotte 74', 90+1'; Fernández 77'; Portillo 83'	Report	Arroyo 11'	Stadium: La Rosaleda; Attendance: 25,000; Referee: Jesús Gil Manzano

8 January 2013	Valencia	2–1 (4–1 agg.)	Osasuna	Valencia
21:30 CET	T. Costa 34'; Soldado 90+3'	Report	Llorente 36'	Stadium: Mestalla; Attendance: 15,000; Referee: Carlos Velasco Carballo

9 January 2013	Sevilla	1–2 (6–2 agg.)	Mallorca	Seville
19:30 CET	Manu del Moral 22'	Report	Brandon 52'; Alfaro 56'	Stadium: Ramón Sánchez Pizjuán; Attendance: 20,000; Referee: José Luis González González

9 January 2013	Zaragoza	2–0 (3–0 agg.)	Levante	Zaragoza
21:30 CET	Zuculini 24'; Montañés 60'	Report		Stadium: La Romareda; Attendance: 12,000; Referee: Xavier Estrada Fernández

9 January 2013	Real Madrid	4–0 (5–2 agg.)	Celta Vigo	Madrid
21:30 CET	Ronaldo 3', 24', 87'; Khedira 89'	Report		Stadium: Santiago Bernabéu; Attendance: 60,600; Referee: Miguel Ángel Ayza Gámez

10 January 2013	Getafe	0–0 (0–3 agg.)	Atlético Madrid	Getafe (Madrid)
19:30 CET		Report		Stadium: Coliseum Alfonso Pérez; Attendance: 5,000; Referee: Ignacio Iglesias Villanueva

10 January 2013	Betis	1–0 (2–1 agg.)	Las Palmas	Seville
21:30 CET	Castro 85'	Report		Stadium: Benito Villamarín; Attendance: 27,755; Referee: Fernando Teixeira Vitienes

10 January 2013	Barcelona	5–0 (7–0 agg.)	Córdoba	Barcelona
21:30 CET	Thiago 17'; Villa 21', 26'; Sánchez 55', 85'	Report		Stadium: Camp Nou; Attendance: 37,607; Referee: Alejandro José Hernández Hernández

== Quarter-finals ==
The first leg matches were played on 15–17 January 2013. The second leg matches were played on 23–24 January 2013.

Team 1	Agg.	Team 2	1st leg	2nd leg
Zaragoza	0–4	Sevilla	0–0	0–4
Real Madrid	3–1	Valencia	2–0	1–1
Atlético Madrid	3–1	Betis	2–0	1–1
Barcelona	6–4	Málaga	2–2	4–2

=== First leg ===
15 January 2013	Real Madrid	2–0	Valencia	Madrid
21:00 CET	Benzema 36'; Guardado 73' (o.g.)	Report		Stadium: Santiago Bernabéu; Attendance: 68,000; Referee: César Muñiz Fernández

16 January 2013	Zaragoza	0–0	Sevilla	Zaragoza
19:30 CET		Report		Stadium: La Romareda; Attendance: 5,000; Referee: Fernando Teixeira Vitienes

16 January 2013	Barcelona	2–2	Málaga	Barcelona
21:30 CET	Messi 29'; Puyol 30'	Report	Iturra 26'; Camacho 89'	Stadium: Camp Nou; Attendance: 55,151; Referee: José Luis González González

17 January 2013	Atlético Madrid	2–0	Betis	Madrid
22:00 CET	Falcao 10'; Filipe Luís 22'	Report		Stadium: Vicente Calderón; Attendance: 40,000; Referee: Alberto Undiano Mallenco

=== Second leg ===
23 January 2013	Sevilla	4–0 (4–0 agg.)	Zaragoza	Seville
19:30 CET	Negredo 36', 67' (pen.); Rakitić 45+3'; Manu del Moral 90+2'	Report		Stadium: Ramón Sánchez Pizjuán; Attendance: 20,000; Referee: Carlos Velasco Carballo

23 January 2013	Valencia	1–1 (1–3 agg.)	Real Madrid	Valencia
21:30 CET	T. Costa 52'	Report	Benzema 44'	Stadium: Mestalla; Attendance: 40,000; Referee: Miguel Ángel Pérez Lasa

24 January 2013	Betis	1–1 (1–3 agg.)	Atlético Madrid	Seville
20:00 CET	Molina 90' (pen.)	Report	Costa 45'	Stadium: Benito Villamarín; Attendance: 21,605; Referee: Carlos Clos Gómez

24 January 2013	Málaga	2–4 (4–6 agg.)	Barcelona	Málaga
22:00 CET	Joaquín 12'; Santa Cruz 68'	Report	Pedro 8'; Piqué 49'; Iniesta 76'; Messi 80'	Stadium: La Rosaleda; Attendance: 27,099; Referee: Antonio Mateu Lahoz

== Semi-finals ==
The first leg matches were played on 30–31 January 2013. The second leg were played on 26–27 February 2013.

Team 1	Agg.	Team 2	1st leg	2nd leg
Real Madrid	4–2	Barcelona	1–1	3–1
Atlético Madrid	4–3	Sevilla	2–1	2–2

=== First leg ===
30 January 2013	Real Madrid	1–1	Barcelona	Madrid
21:00 CET	Varane 81'	Report	Fàbregas 50'	Stadium: Santiago Bernabéu; Attendance: 83,000; Referee: Carlos Clos Gómez

31 January 2013	Atlético Madrid	2–1	Sevilla	Madrid
22:00 CET	Costa 50' (pen.), 71' (pen.)	Report	Negredo 56' (pen.)	Stadium: Vicente Calderón; Attendance: 45,000; Referee: Miguel Ángel Ayza Gámez

=== Second leg ===
26 February 2013	Barcelona	1–3 (2–4 agg.)	Real Madrid	Barcelona
21:00 CET	Alba 89'	Report	Ronaldo 13' (pen.), 57'; Varane 68'	Stadium: Camp Nou; Attendance: 95,002; Referee: Alberto Undiano Mallenco

27 February 2013	Sevilla	2–2 (3–4 agg.)	Atlético Madrid	Seville
22:00 CET	Navas 39'; Rakitić 90+1'	Report	Costa 6'; Falcao 29'	Stadium: Ramón Sánchez Pizjuán; Attendance: 45,000; Referee: Fernando Teixeira Vitienes

== Final ==
The Copa del Rey final was played at Santiago Bernabéu on Friday 17 May 2013.

17 May 2013
21:30 CEST

Real Madrid	1–2 (a.e.t.)	Atlético Madrid
Ronaldo 14'	Report	Costa 35'; Miranda 98'

Santiago Bernabéu, Madrid
Attendance: 80,000
Referee: Carlos Clos Gómez

== Top goalscorers ==
Rank	Player	Club	Goals
1	(Spain) Diego Costa	Atlético Madrid	8
2	(Portugal) Cristiano Ronaldo	Real Madrid	7
3	(Spain) Álvaro Negredo	Sevilla	6
4	(Spain) David Villa	Barcelona	5
5	(France) Karim Benzema	Real Madrid	4
5	(Argentina) Lionel Messi	Barcelona	4
7	(Paraguay) Roque Santa Cruz	Málaga	3
7	(Spain) Rubén Castro	Betis	3
7	(Croatia) Ivan Rakitić	Sevilla	3
10	18 players		2

== See also ==
- 2012–13 La Liga
- 2012–13 Segunda División
- 2012–13 Segunda División B
- 2012–13 Tercera División
