= 2006–07 Sporting de Gijón season =

Real Sporting
2006–07 season
- Chairman: Manuel Vega-Arango
- Manager: Manuel Preciado
- Stadium: El Molinón
- Segunda División: 13th
- Copa del Rey: Second round
- Top goalscorer: Edwin Congo (11)
- Average home league attendance: 10,904

The 2006–07 Sporting de Gijón season was the 9th consecutive season of the club in Segunda División after its last relegation from La Liga.

== Overview ==
Real Sporting finished the season in the thirteenth position, the worst position of the club ever since the 1961–62 season.

== Squad ==
Note: Flags indicate national team as defined under FIFA eligibility rules; some limited exceptions apply. Players may hold more than one non-FIFA nationality.

No.	Pos.	Nation	Player
1	GK	ESP	Alejandro
3	DF	ESP	Chus Bravo
4	DF	ESP	Andreu
5	DF	ESP	Jorge
6	MF	ESP	Javi Fuego
7	MF	ESP	Pedro
8	MF	ESP	Míchel
9	FW	ESP	David Karanka
10	MF	ESP	Gerardo
11	FW	ESP	Omar
12	DF	ESP	Samuel
13	GK	ESP	Roberto

No.	Pos.	Nation	Player
14	MF	ESP	Pablo de Lucas
15	DF	ESP	Roberto Canella
16	FW	COL	Edwin Congo
17	FW	ESP	Diego Castro
18	MF	ESP	Marcos Landeira
19	DF	ESP	Noel Alonso
20	DF	ESP	Raúl Cámara
21	DF	ESP	Juanmi
22	DF	ESP	Rafel Sastre (captain)
23	FW	ESP	David Barral
25	GK	ESP	Manu

=== From the youth squad ===
Note: Flags indicate national team as defined under FIFA eligibility rules; some limited exceptions apply. Players may hold more than one non-FIFA nationality.

No.	Pos.	Nation	Player
26	DF	ESP	Jony López
29	MF	ESP	Jairo
35	FW	ESP	Luis Morán

== Competitions ==
=== Segunda División ===
==== Results by round ====
Round	1	2	3	4	5	6	7	8	9	10	11	12	13	14	15	16	17	18	19	20	21	22	23	24	25	26	27	28	29	30	31	32	33	34	35	36	37	38	39	40	41	42
Ground	H	A	H	A	H	A	H	A	H	A	H	A	H	A	H	A	A	H	A	H	A	A	H	A	H	A	H	A	H	A	H	A	H	A	H	A	H	H	A	H	A	H
Result	L	W	W	L	L	W	W	W	L	L	W	W	W	D	L	L	W	W	L	L	L	L	L	W	D	D	L	W	D	L	L	D	D	D	D	L	W	W	L	W	L	W
Position	19	9	8	13	16	10	7	3	6	8	5	5	5	4	5	6	4	3	5	6	9	10	11	9	10	10	11	9	10	12	13	13	14	14	15	16	13	12	15	13	15	13

Source: BDFutbol
A = Away; H = Home; W = Win; D = Draw; L = Loss

==== League table ====
Pos	Team	Pld	W	D	L	GF	GA	GD	Pts
11	Poli Ejido	42	16	10	16	52	50	+2	58 (Note: NUM: 14 pts; XER: 11 pts; ELC: 4 pts → EJI 2-1 ELC; EJI: 4 pts → ELC 2-0 PEJ)
12	Salamanca	42	15	12	15	53	50	+3	57
13	Sporting Gijón	42	16	8	18	53	53	0	56 (Note: CAS 0–3 SPG; SPG 2–2 CAS)
14	Castellón	42	15	11	16	48	41	+7	56
15	Málaga	42	14	13	15	49	50	−1	55

Source: LFP - Liga Adelante
Rules for classification: 1st points; 2nd head-to-head points; 3rd head-to-head goal difference; 4th head-to-head goals scored; 5th goal difference; 6th number of goals scored; 7th Fair-play points

==== Matches ====
27 August 2006 1	Real Sporting	1–3	Valladolid	Gijón
	Iñaki Bea 43' (o.g.)	Summary	Víctor 31', 89'; De la Cuesta 55'	Stadium: El Molinón; Referee: J.A. Teixeira Vitienes

2 September 2006 2	Lorca Deportiva	0–2	Real Sporting	Lorca
		Summary	Barral 56'; Omar 66'; Samuel (yellow card) (yellow-red card) 87'	Stadium: Francisco Artés Carrasco; Referee: García Bestilleiro

10 September 2006 3	Real Sporting	1–0	Ponferradina	Gijón
	Barral 16'	Summary		Stadium: El Molinón; Referee: Sáez García

16 September 2006 4	Elche	1–0	Real Sporting	Elche
	Peragón 73'	Summary		Stadium: Manuel Martínez Valero; Referee: Pérez Montero

24 September 2006 5	Real Sporting	1–3	Málaga	Gijón
	Congo 18'	Report	Salva 53'; Silva 61'; Calleja 79'	Stadium: El Molinón; Referee: Caballero Herreros

1 October 2006 6	Real Madrid Castilla	0–3	Real Sporting	Madrid
	Agus (yellow card) (yellow-red card) 81'	Summary	Congo 24'; Adrián González 54' (o.g.); Diego Castro 86'	Stadium: Alfredo Di Stéfano; Referee: Paradas Romero

7 October 2006 7	Real Sporting	1–0	Vecindario	Gijón
	Congo 60'	Summary		Stadium: El Molinón; Referee: Iglesias Villanueva

15 October 2006 8	Tenerife	0–4	Real Sporting	Santa Cruz de Tenerife
		Summary	Gerardo 11', 42'; Congo 20'; Guerao 42'	Stadium: Heliodoro Rodríguez López; Referee: Gallo Moreno

22 October 2006 9	Real Sporting	0–1	Murcia	Gijón
		Report	Pedro León 44'; Jofre (red card) 44'	Stadium: El Molinón; Referee: Gardeazábal Gómez

28 October 2006 10	Almería	2–0	Real Sporting	Almería
	Ortiz 13'; Corona 63'	Report		Stadium: Mediterráneo; Referee: Pérez Pérez

4 November 2006 11	Real Sporting	5–4	Cádiz	Gijón
	Barral 34'; Diego Castro 37'; Gerardo 42'; Congo 50'; Jorge 65'	Summary	Jonathan Sesma 13', 47'; Caneda 17'; Abraham Paz 52'	Stadium: El Molinón; Referee: Ontanaya López

12 November 2006 12	Castellón	0–3	Real Sporting	Castellón de la Plana
	Xavi Moré (red card) 44'	Report	Congo 24'; Andreu (red card) 37'; Diego Castro 61'; Míchel 89'	Stadium: Castalia; Referee: Martínez Franco

18 November 2006 13	Real Sporting	1–0	Hércules	Gijón
	Barral 16'; Jorge (yellow card) (yellow-red card) 88'	Report		Stadium: El Molinón; Referee: Hevia Obras

25 November 2006 14	Alavés	0–0	Real Sporting	Vitoria-Gasteiz
		Report		Stadium: Mendizorrotza; Referee: Ceballos Silva

3 December 2006 15	Real Sporting	0–1	Albacete	Gijón
		Summary	Parri 63'	Stadium: El Molinón; Referee: Herráez Prieto

9 December 2006 16	Numancia	2–0	Real Sporting	Soria
	Fukuda 65'; Pablo Lago 89'	Summary		Stadium: Los Pajaritos; Referee: Mateu Lahoz

17 December 2006 17	Salamanca	0–1	Real Sporting	Villares de la Reina
		Summary	Pedro 80'	Stadium: El Helmántico; Referee: Estrada Fernández

21 December 2006 18	Real Sporting	2–0	Las Palmas	Gijón
	Barral 70'; Diego Castro 80'	Report		Stadium: El Molinón; Referee: González González

7 January 2007 19	Ciudad de Murcia	3–1	Real Sporting	Murcia
	Goitom 12'; Luque 47', 76'	Summary	Barral 11'	Stadium: La Condomina; Referee: Hevia Obras

13 January 2007 20	Real Sporting	0–1	Polideportivo Ejido	Gijón
		Summary	Toedtli 72'	Stadium: El Molinón; Referee: Del Cerro Grande

20 January 2007 21	Xerez	3–1	Real Sporting	Jerez de la Frontera
	Arruabarrena 45'; Pedro Ríos 48'; Mendoza 79'	Summary	Barral 23'	Stadium: Chapín; Referee: Rodado Rodríguez

27 January 2007 22	Valladolid	1–0	Real Sporting	Valladolid
	García Calvo 45'	Report	Míchel (yellow card) 0' (yellow-red card) 58'; Samuel (yellow card) 0' (yellow-red card) 77'	Stadium: José Zorrilla; Referee: Bernabé García

4 February 2007 23	Real Sporting	0–1	Lorca Deportiva	Gijón
	Congo (red card) 25'	Summary	Thiaw (red card) 33'; Capi 74'	Stadium: El Molinón; Referee: Pérez Montero

10 February 2007 24	Ponferradina	0–3	Real Sporting	Ponferrada
	Fuentes (red card) 56'	Summary	Barral 25'; Omar 58'; Diego Castro 73'; Míchel (red card) 86'	Stadium: El Toralín; Referee: Caballero Herreros

18 February 2007 25	Real Sporting	0–0	Elche	Gijón
	Roberto (red card) 44'	Summary		Stadium: El Molinón; Referee: Paradas Romero

25 February 2007 26	Málaga	1–1	Real Sporting	Málaga
	Gascón 6'	Summary	Congo 3'	Stadium: La Rosaleda; Referee: J.A. Teixeira Vitienes

4 March 2007 27	Real Sporting	0–1	Real Madrid Castilla	Gijón
	Congo (red card) 88'	Summary	Dani Guillén (yellow card) 0' (yellow-red card) 56'; Tébar 59'	Stadium: El Molinón; Referee: Gallo Moreno

10 March 2007 28	Vecindario	0–2	Real Sporting	Santa Lucía de Tirajana
		Summary	Karanka 36'; Pedro 68'	Stadium: Municipal de Vecindario; Referee: Del Cerro Grande

18 March 2007 29	Real Sporting	1–1	Tenerife	Gijón
	Jorge 80'	Summary	Ayoze 35'; Pablo Sicilia (red card) 77'	Stadium: El Molinón; Referee: Caballero Herreros

24 March 2007 30	Murcia	3–1	Real Sporting	Murcia
	Jofre 17'; Aranda 74'; Noel-Williams 88'	Summary	Sastre 90'	Stadium: Nueva Condomina; Referee: González González

1 April 2007 31	Real Sporting	1–2	Almería	Gijón
	Diego Castro 31'	Summary	Crusat 50'; Acasiete 53'; Bermejo (red card) 88'	Stadium: El Molinón; Referee: Hevia Obras

8 April 2007 32	Cádiz	1–1	Real Sporting	Cádiz
	Pablo Hernández 35'	Summary	Diego Castro 10'	Stadium: Ramón de Carranza; Referee: Ontanaya López

15 April 2007 33	Real Sporting	2–2	Castellón	Gijón
	Jairo 14'; Omar 82'	Summary	Antonio López 26'; Natalio 68'	Stadium: El Molinón; Referee: Ceballos Silva

22 April 2007 34	Hércules	1–1	Real Sporting	Alicante
	Sendoa 50'	Summary	Míchel 38'; Raúl Cámara (yellow card) 0' (yellow-red card) 85'	Stadium: José Rico Pérez; Referee: Caballero Herreros

28 April 2007 35	Real Sporting	1–1	Alavés	Gijón
	Congo 22'	Summary	Jandro 1'	Stadium: El Molinón; Referee: Pérez Pérez

5 May 2007 36	Albacete	2–1	Real Sporting	Albacete
	Calle 19'; Pablo García 62'	Summary	Congo 81'	Stadium: Carlos Belmonte; Referee: Iglesias Villanueva

12 May 2007 37	Real Sporting	1–0	Numancia	Gijón
	Samuel (red card) 34'; Congo 85'	Summary		Stadium: El Molinón; Referee: Mateu Lahoz

19 May 2007 38	Real Sporting	2–1	Salamanca	Gijón
	Gerardo 33'; Javi Fuego 75'	Summary	Braulio (red card) 49'; Míchel 55' (o.g.)	Stadium: El Molinón; Referee: Estrada Fernández

26 May 2007 39	Las Palmas	3–1	Real Sporting	Las Palmas
	David García 16'; Marcos Márquez 24', 90'	Summary	Javi Fuego 63'	Stadium: Gran Canaria; Referee: Hevia Obras

2 June 2007 40	Real Sporting	4–3	Ciudad de Murcia	Gijón
	Jairo Álvarez 32'; Míchel 54'; Goitom 74' (o.g.); Barral 79'	Summary	Xavi Jiménez 27'; Saizar 65'; Javi Fuego 72' (o.g.)	Stadium: El Molinón; Referee: Del Cerro Grande

9 June 2007 41	Polideportivo Ejido	4–1	Real Sporting	El Ejido
	Pedro Vega 30'; Juanma Ortiz 45'; Jonathan Soriano 84' (90)	Summary	Raúl Cámara (yellow card) 0' (yellow-red card) 73'; Omar 87'	Stadium: Santo Domingo; Referee: Pérez Pérez

16 June 2007 42	Real Sporting	2–1	Xerez	Gijón
	Congo 53'; Gerardo 89'	Summary	David Narváez 88' (red card) 89'	Stadium: El Molinón; Referee: García Bestilleiro

=== Copa del Rey ===
==== Matches ====
20 September 2006 Second round	Cádiz	3–2	Real Sporting	Cádiz
	Abraham Paz 40', 83', 89'	Report	David Barral 25'; Abraham Paz 47' (o.g.)	Stadium: Ramón de Carranza; Referee: González González

== Squad statistics ==
=== Appearances and goals ===
No.	Pos	Nat	Player	Total		Segunda División		Copa del Rey	
No.	Pos	Nat	Player	Apps	Goals	Apps	Goals	Apps	Goals
1	GK	(Spain) ESP	Alejandro	5	0	3+1	0	1+0	0
3	DF	(Spain) ESP	Chus Bravo	10	0	8+2	0	0+0	0
4	DF	(Spain) ESP	Andreu	29	1	23+6	1	0+0	0
5	DF	(Spain) ESP	Jorge	31	2	27+3	2	0+1	0
6	MF	(Spain) ESP	Javi Fuego	35	3	22+12	3	1+0	0
7	MF	(Spain) ESP	Pedro	22	2	14+7	2	1+0	0
8	MF	(Spain) ESP	Míchel	35	3	33+2	3	0+0	0
9	FW	(Spain) ESP	David Karanka	12	1	6+6	1	0+0	0
10	MF	(Spain) ESP	Gerardo	35	5	29+6	5	0+0	0
11	FW	(Spain) ESP	Omar	35	4	14+20	4	0+1	0
12	DF	(Spain) ESP	Samuel	34	0	33+0	0	1+0	0
13	GK	(Spain) ESP	Roberto	39	0	39+0	0	0+0	0
14	DF	(Spain) ESP	Pablo de Lucas	18	0	5+13	0	0+0	0
15	DF	(Spain) ESP	Roberto Canella	17	0	12+5	0	0+0	0
16	FW	(Colombia) COL	Edwin Congo	35	11	30+4	11	1+0	0
17	FW	(Spain) ESP	Diego Castro	38	7	31+7	7	0+0	0
18	MF	(Spain) ESP	Marcos Landeira	11	0	9+1	0	1+0	0
19	DF	(Spain) ESP	Noel Alonso	9	0	5+3	0	1+0	0
20	DF	(Spain) ESP	Raúl Cámara	16	0	8+7	0	1+0	0
21	DF	(Spain) ESP	Juanmi	28	0	27+1	0	0+0	0
22	DF	(Spain) ESP	Rafel Sastre	36	1	35+1	1	0+0	0
23	FW	(Spain) ESP	David Barral	38	9	30+7	9	1+0	0
25	GK	(Spain) ESP	Manu	0	0	0+0	0	0+0	0
26	DF	(Spain) ESP	Jony López	14	0	11+2	0	1+0	0
29	MF	(Spain) ESP	Jairo	18	2	8+9	2	1+0	0
35	FW	(Spain) ESP	Luis Morán	1	0	0+1	0	0+0	0
