= Dan Robinson =

Dan or Daniel Robinson may refer to:

- Dan Robinson (runner) (born 1975), English long-distance runner
- Dan Robinson (footballer) (born 1994), Australian rules footballer for Sydney
- Dan Robinson (politician) (1926–2022), American football coach and later Democratic member of the North Carolina Senate
- Dan Robinson (singer) (born 1947), Australian singer
- Daniel George Robinson (1826–1877), British colonel
- Daniel N. Robinson (1937–2018), American psychologist and philosopher
- Daniel Ruiz Robinson (born 1988), Mexican footballer
- Daniel Robinson (Neighbours), a fictional character on Australian soap opera Neighbours
- Danny Robinson (born 1982), British football goalkeeper and coach
- Daniyal Robinson, American collegiate basketball coach

== See also ==
- Daniel Webster Robinson House, Burlington, Vermont
