= 2014–15 Tercera División =

Tercera División
- Season: 2014–15

The 2014–15 Tercera División was the fourth tier of football in Spain. Play started in August 2014 and ended in June 2015 with the promotion play-off finals.

== Competition format ==
- The top four eligible teams in each group, played in the promotion playoffs.
- The champion of each group will qualify to 2015–16 Copa del Rey. If the champion is a reserve team, the first non-reserve team qualified will join the Copa.
- In each group, at least three teams will be relegated to Regional Divisions.

== League tables ==
Key to colors in league table:
Group Winners Promotion playoffs
Promotion playoffs
Direct relegation

=== Group I – Galicia ===
Location of teams of the 2014–15 Tercera División Group I

Pos	Team	Pld	W	D	L	GF	GA	GD	Pts
1	Pontevedra (P)	38	24	7	7	65	25	+40	79
2	Deportivo B	38	21	8	9	66	32	+34	71
3	Cerceda	38	18	10	10	64	37	+27	64
4	Choco	38	18	8	12	58	39	+19	62
5	Bergantiños	38	16	11	11	46	31	+15	59
6	Ribadeo	38	17	7	14	54	64	−10	58
7	Ribadumia	38	16	10	12	56	44	+12	58
8	Alondras	38	15	11	12	43	41	+2	56
9	Racing Villalbés	38	14	14	10	49	38	+11	56
10	Rápido de Bouzas	38	14	14	10	48	35	+13	56
11	Arosa	38	14	12	12	51	42	+9	54
12	Barbadás	38	15	8	15	39	40	−1	53
13	Órdenes	38	15	8	15	47	48	−1	53
14	As Pontes	38	13	13	12	48	50	−2	52
15	Boiro	38	13	12	13	51	48	+3	51
16	Silva	38	13	9	16	44	58	−14	48
17	Xuventú Sanxenxo (R)	38	12	5	21	48	65	−17	41
18	Cultural Areas (R)	38	9	7	22	41	65	−24	34
19	Laracha (R)	38	8	9	21	28	61	−33	33
20	Bertamiráns (R)	38	1	5	32	26	109	−83	8

(P) Promoted; (R) Relegated
- Promoted from Preferente: Negreira (One year after), Galicia de Mugardos (First time ever), Barco (21 years after), Verín (5 years after) and Noia (First time ever).

Top goalscorers

Goalscorers	Goals	Team
(Spain) Changui	24	Ribadumia
(Spain) Pablo Carnero	19	Pontevedra
(Portugal) Miguel Cardoso	17	Deportivo B
(Spain) Uxío Dapena	17	Cerceda
(Spain) Adrián Camiño	16	Arosa

Top goalkeeper

Goalkeeper	Goals	Matches	Average	Team
(Spain) Edu Sousa	21	31	0.68	Pontevedra

=== Group II – Asturias ===
Location of teams of the 2014–15 Tercera División Group II
Teams in Oviedo: Astur, Covadonga, Oviedo B, Universidad

Pos	Team	Pld	W	D	L	GF	GA	GD	Pts
1	Condal	38	26	8	4	67	20	+47	86
2	Caudal	38	25	9	4	68	18	+50	84
3	Oviedo B	38	23	9	6	82	34	+48	78
4	Tuilla	38	23	8	7	67	31	+36	77
5	Covadonga	38	21	7	10	63	39	+24	70
6	Ceares	38	16	15	7	51	41	+10	63
7	Llanes	38	16	13	9	61	51	+10	61
8	Praviano	38	13	12	13	47	46	+1	51
9	Urraca	38	12	14	12	50	47	+3	50
10	Atlético de Lugones	38	13	10	15	45	49	−4	49
11	Mosconia	38	11	14	13	37	45	−8	47
12	Avilés B (R)	38	11	13	14	46	53	−7	46 (Note: Due to Real Avilés relegation from Segunda División B to this group, the reserve team, Real Avilés B, was relegated to Regional Preferente.)
13	Astur	38	11	13	14	39	52	−13	46
14	Gijón Industrial	38	12	10	16	42	50	−8	46
15	Roces	38	11	12	15	37	43	−6	45
16	Andés (R)	38	12	7	19	44	60	−16	43 (Note: Due to the relegation of Marino de Luanco and Langreo, L'Entregu and Andés are relegated to Regional Preferente for maintaining 20 teams in the group.)
17	L'Entregu (R)	38	9	11	18	34	54	−20	38
18	Lenense (R)	38	8	6	24	38	72	−34	30
19	Universidad de Oviedo (R)	38	6	5	27	30	78	−48	23
20	Cudillero (D)	38	2	2	34	10	75	−65	0 (Note: Team deducted 8 points)

(D) Disqualified; (R) Relegated
Notes:
- Promoted from Preferente: Siero (6 years after), Colunga (First time ever) and Tineo (First time ever).

Top goalscorers

Goalscorers	Goals	Team
(Spain) David González	23	Oviedo B
(Spain) Villa	20	Tuilla
(Spain) Jairo Cárcaba	17	Condal
(Spain) Chus Jiménez	16	Caudal
(Spain) Jaime Álvarez	14	Covadonga

Top goalkeeper

Goalkeeper	Goals	Matches	Average	Team
(Spain) Jesús Lastra	18	29	0.62	Condal

=== Group III – Cantabria ===
Location of teams of the 2014–15 Tercera División Group III
Teams in Santander: Rayo Cantabria, Racing B, Atlético Albericia
Teams in Torrelavega: Gimnástica, Barreda

Pos	Team	Pld	W	D	L	GF	GA	GD	Pts
1	Laredo	38	28	5	5	81	22	+59	89
2	Gimnástica	38	25	10	3	75	23	+52	85
3	Racing B	38	24	9	5	70	23	+47	81
4	Cayón	38	24	8	6	70	34	+36	80
5	Rayo Cantabria	38	22	8	8	65	26	+39	74
6	Textil Escudo	38	18	7	13	51	45	+6	61
7	Revilla	38	17	7	14	54	56	−2	58
8	Atlético Albericia	38	13	14	11	40	34	+6	53
9	Castro	38	15	8	15	30	39	−9	50 (Note: Team deducted 3 points)
10	Vimenor	38	12	14	12	42	43	−1	50
11	Siete Villas	38	11	14	13	47	58	−11	47
12	Escobedo	38	12	10	16	43	50	−7	46
13	Gama	38	11	8	19	29	53	−24	41
14	Selaya	38	10	11	17	41	53	−12	41
15	Bezana	38	10	10	18	40	61	−21	40
16	Colindres	38	9	12	17	47	55	−8	39
17	Santoña (R)	38	8	9	21	33	52	−19	33 (Note: Due to the relegation of CD Tropezón, Santoña is relegated to Regional Preferente for maintaining 20 teams in the group.)
18	Arenas de Frajanas (R)	38	8	7	23	31	69	−38	31
19	Buelna (R)	38	7	7	24	32	68	−36	28
20	Barreda (R)	38	3	8	27	23	80	−57	17

(R) Relegated
Notes:
- Promoted from Preferente: Guarnizo (One year after), Sámano (26 years after) and Naval (12 years after).

Top goalscorers

Goalscorers	Goals	Team
(Spain) Álvaro Santamaría	23	Cayón
(Spain) Roberto Platero	20	Gimnástica
(Spain) Héctor Marcos	15	Textil Escudo
(Spain) Óscar Briz	15	Cayón
(Spain) Chema Torrontegui	15	Selaya

Top goalkeeper

Goalkeeper	Goals	Matches	Average	Team
(Spain) Rubén Lavín	30	34	0.88	Cayón

=== Group IV – Basque Country ===
Location of teams of the 2014–15 Tercera División Group IV
Teams in Vitoria-Gasteiz: Alavés B, Aurrerá

Pos	Team	Pld	W	D	L	GF	GA	GD	Pts
1	Portugalete (P)	38	20	15	3	68	27	+41	75
2	Gernika (P)	38	21	12	5	54	21	+33	75
3	Arenas (P)	38	20	11	7	62	31	+31	71
4	Durango	38	20	7	11	43	30	+13	67
5	Beasain	38	18	13	7	52	41	+11	67
6	Zalla	38	18	12	8	50	36	+14	66
7	Alavés B	38	16	10	12	52	41	+11	58
8	Berio	38	15	12	11	38	32	+6	57
9	Balmaseda	38	16	7	15	43	37	+6	55
10	Santurtzi	38	14	9	15	48	49	−1	51
11	Zamudio	38	13	11	14	53	49	+4	50
12	Aurrerá	38	14	7	17	44	48	−4	49
13	Santutxu	38	12	10	16	31	43	−12	46
14	Bermeo	38	10	15	13	35	49	−14	45
15	Lagun Onak	38	11	10	17	38	43	−5	43
16	Baskonia	38	10	12	16	44	57	−13	42
17	Pasaia	38	10	8	20	35	49	−14	38
18	Erandio (R)	38	9	5	24	33	62	−29	32
19	Oiartzun (R)	38	5	11	22	24	55	−31	26
20	Amurrio (R)	38	5	9	24	25	72	−47	24

(P) Promoted; (R) Relegated
- Promoted from Preferente and División de Honor: Vitoria (3 years after), Elgorriaga (First time ever), Deusto (30 years after), Getxo (2 years after), Aurrerá de Ondarroa (9 years after) and Aretxabaleta (5 years after).

Top goalscorers

Goalscorers	Goals	Team
(Spain) Jon Ander Pérez	21	Aurrerá
(Spain) Asier Villalibre	20	Baskonia
(Spain) Íñigo Pradera	16	Baskonia
(Spain) Ander Franco	16	Lagun Onak
(Spain) Asier Benito	16	Alavés B

Top goalkeeper

Goalkeeper	Goals	Matches	Average	Team
(Spain) Jon Altamira	15	29	0.52	Gernika

=== Group V – Catalonia ===
Pos	Team	Pld	W	D	L	GF	GA	GD	Pts
1	Ascó	38	21	9	8	61	34	+27	72
2	Pobla de Mafumet (P)	38	20	9	9	54	30	+24	69
3	Europa	38	19	11	8	53	32	+21	68
4	Figueres	38	17	8	13	46	44	+2	59
5	Vilafranca	38	17	8	13	57	56	+1	59
6	Prat	38	15	14	9	49	34	+15	59
7	Terrassa	38	16	11	11	56	42	+14	59
8	Rubí	38	14	12	12	47	40	+7	54
9	Masnou	38	13	12	13	40	48	−8	51
10	Cerdanyola del Vallès	38	12	13	13	44	49	−5	49
11	Palamós	38	13	10	15	52	53	−1	49
12	Peralada	38	13	10	15	41	50	−9	49
13	Montañesa	38	13	9	16	41	40	+1	48
14	Gavà	38	15	3	20	42	54	−12	48
15	Sabadell B	38	11	14	13	46	49	−3	47
16	Santfeliuenc	38	12	11	15	41	48	−7	47
17	Manlleu	38	11	12	15	51	54	−3	45
18	Castelldefels (R)	38	10	11	17	39	47	−8	41
19	Martinenc (R)	38	9	10	19	49	70	−21	37
20	Vilassar de Mar (R)	38	7	7	24	28	63	−35	28

(P) Promoted; (R) Relegated
- Promoted from Primera Catalana: Júpiter (2 years after), Granollers (9 years after) and Morell (First time ever).

Top goalscorers

Goalscorers	Goals	Team
(Spain) Santi Triguero	21	Vilafranca
(Spain) Sergi Arimany	17	Palamós
(Spain) Manel Sala	17	Manlleu
(Spain) Pedro García	16	Montañesa
(Spain) Xavier Revert	16	Figueres

Top goalkeeper

Goalkeeper	Goals	Matches	Average	Team
(Spain) Alberto Varo	27	33	0.82	Pobla de Mafumet

=== Group VI – Valencian Community ===
Location of teams of the 2014–15 Tercera División Group VI

Pos	Team	Pld	W	D	L	GF	GA	GD	Pts
1	Castellón	40	20	14	6	61	29	+32	74
2	Atlético Levante (P)	40	20	12	8	61	31	+30	72
3	Novelda	40	19	9	12	66	36	+30	66
4	Villarreal C	40	17	11	12	60	51	+9	62 (Note: Villarreal C could not participate in the play-offs as they are reserve team of Villarreal B who are in Segunda División B.)
5	Ontinyent	40	16	14	10	57	36	+21	62
6	Muro	40	17	11	12	55	56	−1	62
7	Orihuela	40	17	11	12	55	35	+20	62
8	Crevillente	40	14	17	9	43	35	+8	59
9	Benigànim	40	16	11	13	54	51	+3	59
10	Torrevieja	40	15	12	13	44	45	−1	57
11	Atlético Saguntino	40	14	12	14	51	48	+3	54
12	Acero	40	14	11	15	51	67	−16	53
13	Torre Levante	40	11	18	11	40	42	−2	51
14	Alzira	40	13	11	16	49	59	−10	50
15	Paterna	40	13	10	17	42	59	−17	49
16	Jove Español	40	13	8	19	36	54	−18	47
17	Cullera	40	10	17	13	49	52	−3	47
18	Ribarroja (R)	40	10	15	15	31	47	−16	45
19	La Nucía (R)	40	9	13	18	36	44	−8	40
20	Sporting Requena (R)	40	6	14	20	33	64	−31	32
21	Utiel (R)	40	5	11	24	31	64	−33	26

(P) Promoted; (R) Relegated
Notes:
- Promoted from Preferente: Buñol (11 years after), Recambios Colón (First time ever) and Rayo Ibense (28 years after).

Top goalscorers

Goalscorers	Goals	Team
(Spain) Christian Perales	25	Ontinyent
(Spain) Mateo Sanchis	15	Benigànim
(Spain) Gerardo Reyes	14	Paterna
(Spain) Rubén Fonte	14	Acero
(Spain) Cristian Herrera	14	Villarreal C

Top goalkeeper

Goalkeeper	Goals	Matches	Average	Team
(Spain) Gerardo Rubio	29	38	0.76	Ontinyent

=== Group VII – Community of Madrid ===
Location of teams of the 2014–15 Tercera División Group VII

Pos	Team	Pld	W	D	L	GF	GA	GD	Pts
1	Rayo Majadahonda (P)	38	21	8	9	67	38	+29	71
2	Navalcarnero	38	18	10	10	43	37	+6	64
3	Alcobendas Sport	38	17	13	8	59	39	+20	64
4	Unión Adarve	38	17	12	9	40	31	+9	63
5	Alcorcón B	38	17	12	9	57	41	+16	63
6	San Sebastián de los Reyes	38	18	8	12	47	32	+15	62
7	Internacional	38	16	12	10	48	42	+6	60
8	RSD Alcalá	38	13	17	8	41	29	+12	56
9	Real Madrid C	38	16	7	15	50	40	+10	55 (Note: Real Madrid C was disbanded after the end of the season.)
10	Pozuelo de Alarcón	38	16	6	16	46	45	+1	54
11	Parla	38	14	11	13	47	39	+8	53
12	Atlético Pinto	38	15	7	16	44	42	+2	52
13	Atlético Madrid C (R)	38	14	7	17	53	66	−13	49 (Note: Due to Atlético Madrid B relegation from Segunda División B to this group, the reserve team, Atlético Madrid C, was relegated to Preferente.)
14	Puerta Bonita	38	12	11	15	42	44	−2	47
15	Móstoles	38	11	13	14	44	46	−2	46
16	San Fernando	38	9	17	12	35	42	−7	44
17	Villanueva del Pardillo (R)	38	10	13	15	37	51	−14	43
18	Alcobendas CF (R)	38	7	15	16	35	49	−14	36
19	Colmenar Viejo (R)	38	10	5	23	35	65	−30	35
20	Torrejón (R)	38	6	2	30	22	74	−52	20

(P) Promoted; (R) Relegated
Notes:
- Promoted from Preferente: Aravaca (One year after), Collado Villalba (One year after), Colonia Moscardó (2 years after) and Lugo Fuenlabrada (First time ever).

Top goalscorer

Goalscorers	Goals	Team
(Spain) Álvaro Portilla	24	Rayo Majadahonda
(Spain) Dani García	17	Internacional
(Spain) Álex García	17	Alcobendas Sport
(Spain) Leandro Martínez	15	Atlético Madrid C
(Spain) Borja Acha	15	Rayo Majadahonda

Top goalkeeper

Goalkeeper	Goals	Matches	Average	Team
(Spain) David de las Heras	22	31	0.71	Unión Adarve

=== Group VIII – Castile and León ===
Location of teams of the 2014–15 Tercera División Group VIII

Pos	Team	Pld	W	D	L	GF	GA	GD	Pts
1	Arandina (P)	38	21	11	6	63	29	+34	74
2	Numancia B	38	17	15	6	65	28	+37	66
3	Palencia	38	16	17	5	62	36	+26	65
4	Gimnástica Segoviana	38	18	10	10	46	31	+15	64
5	Atlético Bembibre	38	19	7	12	62	29	+33	64
6	Almazán	38	18	8	12	54	42	+12	62
7	Becerril	38	18	5	15	56	53	+3	59
8	La Virgen del Camino	38	16	9	13	50	46	+4	57
9	Salmantino (Z)	38	15	10	13	60	47	+13	55 (Note: Salmantino was relegated to the last tier by the Federation, as it is considered a new club and would not occupy the vacant place of UD Salamanca B when it was dissolved. Its place is occupied the next season by CD Villamuriel.)
10	Mirandés B	38	15	9	14	44	44	0	54
11	La Bañeza	38	15	7	16	42	41	+1	52
12	Beroil Bupolsa	38	13	13	12	40	44	−4	52
13	Villaralbo	38	12	11	15	36	47	−11	47
14	Atlético Tordesillas	38	12	11	15	44	62	−18	47
15	Cristo Atlético	38	11	12	15	40	45	−5	45
16	Burgos Promesas	38	11	9	18	38	63	−25	42
17	Cebrereña	38	10	11	17	37	55	−18	41
18	La Granja (R)	38	10	7	21	33	61	−28	37
19	Real Ávila (R)	38	7	12	19	37	51	−14	33
20	Villa de Simancas (R)	38	5	8	25	38	93	−55	23

(P) Promoted; (R) Relegated; (Z) Relegated to Primera División Provincial
Notes:
- Promoted from Primera Regional: Sporting Uxama (11 years after), Santa Marta (One year after) and Ciudad Rodrigo (33 years after).

Top goalscorers

Goalscorers	Goals	Team
(Spain) Diego Torres	25	Palencia
(Spain) Nacho Sánchez	19	Almazán
(Spain) Pablo Valcarce	17	Numancia B
(Spain) Marcos Fernández	16	Atlético Bembibre
(Spain) Juan Adalia	15	Atlético Tordesillas

Top goalkeeper

Goalkeeper	Goals	Matches	Average	Team
(Spain) Álex Hernández	24	36	0.67	Arandina

=== Group IX – Eastern Andalusia and Melilla ===
Location of teams of the 2014–15 Tercera División Group IX

Pos	Team	Pld	W	D	L	GF	GA	GD	Pts
1	Linares (P)	38	27	7	4	88	26	+62	88
2	Atlético Malagueño	38	23	6	9	69	36	+33	75
3	San Pedro	38	21	10	7	65	35	+30	73
4	Martos	38	22	5	11	66	42	+24	71
5	Loja	38	20	9	9	55	36	+19	69
6	Huétor Tájar	38	17	11	10	53	37	+16	62
7	Los Villares	38	15	13	10	43	37	+6	58
8	Maracena	38	16	9	13	66	52	+14	57
9	Guadix	38	11	18	9	49	49	0	51
10	Atlético Mancha Real	38	13	11	14	36	34	+2	50
11	Vélez	38	13	10	15	49	47	+2	49
12	Español del Alquián	38	14	6	18	53	70	−17	48
13	El Ejido	38	13	8	17	55	75	−20	47
14	Ronda	38	12	7	19	52	63	−11	43
15	Antequera	38	10	12	16	51	55	−4	42
16	Alhaurín de la Torre	38	11	8	19	43	74	−31	41
17	Atarfe Industrial	38	9	10	19	53	70	−17	37
18	Villacarrillo (R)	38	8	7	23	32	64	−32	31
19	Atlético Melilla (R)	38	7	9	22	29	58	−29	30
20	Los Molinos (R)	38	6	8	24	32	79	−47	26

(P) Promoted; (R) Relegated
- Promoted from Primera Andaluza and Primera Melilla: Rincón (First time ever), Comarca del Mármol (First time ever) and River Melilla (First time ever).

Top goalscorers

Goalscorers	Goals	Team
(Spain) Vitu	27	Martos
(Spain) Rafa Payán	23	Linares
(Spain) Juanfran Holanda	18	Linares
(Spain) Juanfri García	18	San Pedro
(Spain) Antonio López	16	Atarfe Industrial

Top goalkeeper

Goalkeeper	Goals	Matches	Average	Team
(Spain) Lopito	24	35	0.69	Linares

=== Group X – Western Andalusia and Ceuta ===
Location of teams of the 2014–15 Tercera División Group X

Pos	Team	Pld	W	D	L	GF	GA	GD	Pts
1	Algeciras (P)	42	31	7	4	77	28	+49	100
2	San Fernando	42	28	7	7	88	28	+60	91
3	Gerena	42	28	3	11	89	38	+51	87
4	Atlético Sanluqueño	42	26	5	11	74	40	+34	83
5	Ceuta	42	20	12	10	50	32	+18	72
6	Lebrijana	42	18	6	18	60	66	−6	60
7	Conil	42	16	12	14	51	60	−9	60
8	Sevilla C	42	15	13	14	42	45	−3	58
9	Écija	42	15	13	14	49	41	+8	58
10	Alcalá	42	15	12	15	40	52	−12	57
11	Coria	42	16	9	17	48	42	+6	57
12	San Roque	42	14	14	14	47	49	−2	56
13	San Juan	42	14	10	18	48	49	−1	52
14	Los Barrios	42	15	7	20	45	50	−5	52
15	Guadalcacín	42	14	10	18	39	48	−9	52
16	Cabecense	42	12	13	17	36	54	−18	49
17	Arcos	42	14	6	22	46	74	−28	48
18	Mairena (R)	42	11	11	20	42	55	−13	44
19	Rociera (R)	42	10	10	22	40	73	−33	40
20	Cádiz B (R)	42	9	11	22	45	54	−9	38
21	La Palma (R)	42	9	9	24	35	69	−34	36
22	Recreativo B (R)	42	9	6	27	34	78	−44	33

(P) Promoted; (R) Relegated

Top goalscorers

Goalscorers	Goals	Team
(Spain) Joselu Muñoz	20	Algeciras
(Spain) Javi Medina	20	Gerena
(Spain) Jesús Granado	16	San Fernando
(Spain) Ñoño Ascensio	16	San Fernando
(Spain) Tati Maldonado	15	San Fernando

Top goalkeeper

Goalkeeper	Goals	Matches	Average	Team
(Spain) Josemi Márquez	24	40	0.6	Algeciras

=== Group XI – Balearic Islands ===
Location of teams of the 2014–15 Tercera División Group XI

Pos	Team	Pld	W	D	L	GF	GA	GD	Pts
1	Formentera	38	20	13	5	41	13	+28	73
2	Llosetense (P)	38	20	12	6	66	35	+31	72
3	Peña Deportiva	38	21	9	8	57	40	+17	72
4	Mercadal	38	19	10	9	64	32	+32	67
5	Constància	38	19	9	10	64	42	+22	66
6	Poblense	38	18	12	8	64	37	+27	66
7	Binissalem	38	17	15	6	63	33	+30	66
8	Sóller	38	13	14	11	52	54	−2	53
9	Penya Ciutadella	38	14	8	16	43	50	−7	50
10	San Rafael	38	12	12	14	45	43	+2	48
11	Montuïri	38	12	9	17	49	58	−9	45
12	Campos	38	10	13	15	34	44	−10	43
13	Collerense	38	11	10	17	42	52	−10	43
14	Alaró	38	10	12	16	44	55	−11	42
15	Alcúdia	38	9	15	14	32	52	−20	42
16	Ferriolense	38	10	11	17	39	50	−11	41
17	Platges de Calvià	38	7	20	11	32	41	−9	41
18	Son Cladera (R)	38	9	8	21	30	65	−35	35
19	Manacor (R)	38	6	13	19	36	65	−29	31
20	Atlético Rafal (R)	38	5	11	22	37	73	−36	26

(P) Promoted; (R) Relegated

Top goalscorers

Goalscorers	Goals	Team
(Spain) Mateo Ferrer	25	Constància
(Spain) Diego Piquero	18	Peña Deportiva
(Senegal) Lima Sow	17	Alaró
(Spain) Javier Zurbano	17	Penya Ciutadella
(Spain) Aitor Pons	17	Llosetense

Top goalkeeper

Goalkeeper	Goals	Matches	Average	Team
(Spain) Marcos Contreras	13	38	0.34	Formentera

=== Group XII – Canary Islands ===
Location of teams of the 2014–15 Tercera División Group XII

Pos	Team	Pld	W	D	L	GF	GA	GD	Pts
1	Mensajero (P)	38	20	11	7	61	35	+26	71
2	Lanzarote	38	19	11	8	60	44	+16	68
3	Marino	38	16	17	5	58	42	+16	65
4	Sporting San José	38	15	15	8	57	38	+19	60
5	Unión Sur Yaiza	38	15	11	12	40	35	+5	56
6	Villa de Santa Brígida	38	14	11	13	55	50	+5	53
7	Tenerife B	38	13	13	12	53	42	+11	52
8	Unión Viera	38	14	9	15	61	54	+7	51
9	Arucas	38	14	8	16	46	52	−6	50
10	Ibarra	38	12	13	13	51	58	−7	49
11	El Cotillo	38	12	11	15	40	62	−22	47
12	Atlético Granadilla	38	12	11	15	45	53	−8	47
13	Santa Úrsula	38	13	8	17	41	49	−8	47
14	Tenisca	38	11	14	13	54	48	+6	47
15	Telde	38	11	13	14	44	51	−7	46
16	Las Zocas	38	13	7	18	53	67	−14	46
17	Vera	38	12	9	17	55	68	−13	45
18	Estrella (R)	38	11	11	16	49	45	+4	44
19	Laguna (R)	38	11	11	16	45	58	−13	44
20	Victoria de Acentejo (R)	38	11	8	19	41	58	−17	41

(P) Promoted; (R) Relegated

Top goalscorers

Goalscorers	Goals	Team
(Uruguay) Pedro Manzi	27	Ibarra
(Spain) Ale Peraza	26	Unión Viera
(Spain) Yeray Pérez	25	Mensajero
(Spain) Rosmen Quevedo	25	Lanzarote
(Spain) Balduino Real	21	Marino

Top goalkeeper

Goalkeeper	Goals	Matches	Average	Team
(Spain) Kilian Pérez	29	35	0.83	Mensajero

=== Group XIII – Region of Murcia ===
Location of teams of the 2014–15 Tercera División Group XIII

Pos	Team	Pld	W	D	L	GF	GA	GD	Pts
1	Jumilla (P)	34	22	6	6	60	29	+31	72
2	Real Murcia Imperial	34	19	12	3	56	20	+36	69
3	El Castillo	34	21	5	8	58	32	+26	68
4	Águilas	34	18	10	6	66	30	+36	64
5	Mar Menor	34	19	3	12	47	32	+15	60
6	Yeclano	34	16	8	10	56	43	+13	56
7	Minera	34	13	11	10	43	42	+1	50
8	La Unión	34	14	5	15	44	46	−2	47
9	Pinatar	34	12	9	13	42	44	−2	45
10	Plus Ultra	34	12	7	15	50	59	−9	43
11	Muleño	34	10	9	15	43	41	+2	39
12	Palmar Estrella Grana	34	11	6	17	44	51	−7	39
13	Caravaca Vera Cruz	34	10	8	16	37	48	−11	38
14	Fortuna	34	8	14	12	48	61	−13	38
15	Alhama	34	8	11	15	39	56	−17	35
16	Cartagena FC (R)	34	9	8	17	36	58	−22	35
17	Molina (R)	34	6	11	17	32	55	−23	29
18	Cieza (R)	34	4	5	25	23	77	−54	17

(P) Promoted; (R) Relegated

Top goalscorers

Goalscorers	Goals	Team
(Spain) Andrés Carrasco	29	Águilas
(Spain) Campanas	19	El Castillo
(Spain) Isi Ros	16	Plus Ultra
(Spain) Javier Huéscar	15	La Unión
(Spain) Roberto Alarcón	15	Real Murcia Imperial

Top goalkeeper

Goalkeeper	Goals	Matches	Average	Team
(Spain) José Antonio Rojo	27	33	0.82	Jumilla

=== Group XIV – Extremadura ===
Location of teams of the 2014–15 Tercera División Group XIV

Pos	Team	Pld	W	D	L	GF	GA	GD	Pts
1	Mérida (P)	38	31	5	2	101	20	+81	98
2	Extremadura	38	26	9	3	86	24	+62	87
3	Jerez	38	25	6	7	70	18	+52	81
4	Badajoz	38	23	8	7	71	31	+40	77
5	Coria	38	20	6	12	55	40	+15	66
6	Moralo	38	19	8	11	65	44	+21	65
7	Don Benito	38	18	10	10	48	37	+11	64
8	Azuaga	38	15	10	13	44	44	0	55
9	Atlético Pueblonuevo	38	13	13	12	50	42	+8	52
10	Santa Amalia	38	15	6	17	44	50	−6	51
11	Díter Zafra	38	12	14	12	51	48	+3	50
12	Fuente de Cantos	38	12	6	20	39	61	−22	42
13	Atlético San José	38	13	3	22	48	75	−27	42
14	Olivenza	38	11	7	20	46	69	−23	40
15	Valdivia	38	10	7	21	43	73	−30	37
16	Sanvicenteño	38	9	7	22	34	61	−27	34
17	Deportivo Pacense	38	9	6	23	46	93	−47	33
18	Castuera (R)	38	8	9	21	39	68	−29	33
19	Plasencia (R)	38	6	9	23	49	83	−34	27
20	Hernán Cortés (R)	38	6	9	23	35	83	−48	27

(P) Promoted; (R) Relegated

Top goalscorers

Goalscorers	Goals	Team
(Spain) Jesús Perera	23	Mérida
(Spain) Willy Ledesma	22	Extremadura
(Spain) Copito	19	Badajoz
(Spain) Rulo	18	Moralo
(Spain) Toni Moreno	18	Mérida

Top goalkeeper

Goalkeeper	Goals	Matches	Average	Team
(Spain) Álex Gragera	18	38	0.47	Jerez

=== Group XV – Navarre ===
Location of teams of the 2014–15 Tercera División Group XV
Teams in Pamplona: Osasuna B, Oberena, San Juan, Iruña, Txantrea, Pamplona

Pos	Team	Pld	W	D	L	GF	GA	GD	Pts
1	Peña Sport (P)	38	28	5	5	71	30	+41	89
2	San Juan	38	25	6	7	53	16	+37	81
3	Izarra (P)	38	21	10	7	68	35	+33	73
4	Osasuna B	38	21	9	8	64	31	+33	72
5	Mutilvera	38	19	10	9	66	39	+27	67
6	Oberena	38	18	8	12	56	43	+13	62
7	Cortes	38	16	9	13	47	49	−2	57
8	Burladés	38	14	14	10	46	39	+7	56
9	Huarte	38	16	8	14	51	44	+7	56
10	Iruña	38	15	8	15	46	45	+1	53
11	Txantrea	38	13	12	13	56	53	+3	51
12	Valle de Egüés	38	13	9	16	65	63	+2	48
13	Atlético Cirbonero	38	12	10	16	44	48	−4	46
14	Ardoi	38	13	5	20	42	52	−10	44
15	Subiza	38	11	8	19	52	77	−25	41
16	Pamplona	38	10	11	17	40	55	−15	41
17	Beti Onak	38	9	12	17	39	58	−19	39
18	Idoya (R)	38	11	4	23	35	69	−34	37
19	Atlético Valtierrano (R)	38	5	9	24	31	75	−44	24
20	Corellano (R)	38	4	5	29	27	78	−51	17

(P) Promoted; (R) Relegated

Top goalscorers

Goalscorers	Goals	Team
(Spain) Alberto Mendioroz	23	Huarte
(Spain) Imanol Echeverría	22	Valle de Egüés
(Spain) Miguel Maeztu	15	Peña Sport
(Spain) Iker Tellería	15	Beti Onak
(Spain) Álex Chico	14	Izarra

Top goalkeeper

Goalkeeper	Goals	Matches	Average	Team
(Spain) Ander Garijo	13	30	0.43	San Juan

=== Group XVI – La Rioja ===
Location of teams of the 2014–15 Tercera División Group XVI
Teams in Logroño: SD Logroñés, Calasancio, Peña Balsamaiso, Yagüe

Pos	Team	Pld	W	D	L	GF	GA	GD	Pts
1	Varea	38	32	2	4	123	29	+94	98
2	Calahorra	38	31	3	4	102	23	+79	96
3	SD Logroñés	38	29	5	4	105	34	+71	92
4	Haro	38	27	4	7	93	25	+68	85
5	Náxara	38	24	6	8	80	36	+44	78
6	Anguiano	38	22	8	8	65	34	+31	74
7	Alfaro	38	23	5	10	73	40	+33	74
8	Agoncillo	38	18	9	11	69	49	+20	63
9	La Calzada	38	15	6	17	54	63	−9	51
10	Oyonesa	38	15	5	18	35	52	−17	50
11	Atlético Vianés	38	12	10	16	39	55	−16	46
12	River Ebro	38	10	11	17	52	75	−23	41
13	Peña Balsamaiso	38	10	7	21	38	74	−36	37
14	Arnedo	38	9	8	21	31	51	−20	35
15	Tedeón	38	9	5	24	29	78	−49	32
16	Calasancio	38	8	8	22	40	62	−22	32
17	Villegas	38	8	7	23	23	65	−42	31
18	Yagüe (R)	38	8	4	26	40	95	−55	28
19	Ciudad de Alfaro (R)	38	5	6	27	23	81	−58	21
20	Casalarreina (R)	38	3	5	30	25	118	−93	14

(R) Relegated

Top goalscorers

Goalscorers	Goals	Team
(Spain) Rubén Pérez	45	Varea
(Spain) Rubén Peña	29	SD Logroñés
(Ecuador) Jordan Gaspar	21	Agoncillo
(Spain) Txutxi Sánchez	16	Haro
(Spain) Félix del Puente	16	Calahorra

Top goalkeeper

Goalkeeper	Goals	Matches	Average	Team
(Spain) Raúl Heras	26	30	0.87	Varea

=== Group XVII – Aragon ===
Location of teams of the 2014–15 Tercera División Group XVII

Pos	Team	Pld	W	D	L	GF	GA	GD	Pts
1	Ebro (P)	38	27	5	6	84	27	+57	86
2	Teruel	38	26	6	6	72	36	+36	84
3	Sariñena	38	23	9	6	72	26	+46	78
4	Tarazona	38	24	5	9	76	36	+40	77
5	Andorra	38	22	10	6	54	24	+30	76
6	Borja	38	16	13	9	54	34	+20	61
7	Cuarte	38	16	12	10	46	40	+6	60
8	Almudévar	38	16	11	11	49	39	+10	59
9	Utebo	38	16	7	15	49	60	−11	55
10	Ejea	38	14	10	14	51	45	+6	52
11	Illueca	38	14	8	16	48	58	−10	50
12	Villa de Alagón	38	13	8	17	40	61	−21	47
13	Atlético Monzón	38	11	10	17	51	62	−11	43
14	Sabiñánigo	38	12	6	20	53	65	−12	42
15	Binéfar	38	10	10	18	37	56	−19	40
16	Villanueva	38	10	10	18	35	50	−15	40
17	Tamarite (R)	38	10	5	23	34	63	−29	35
18	Caspe (R)	38	9	8	21	30	48	−18	35
19	Santa Isabel (R)	38	6	11	21	29	52	−23	29
20	Barbastro (R)	38	2	2	34	26	108	−82	6 (Note: Team deducted 2 points)

(P) Promoted; (R) Relegated
Notes:

Top goalscorers

Goalscorers	Goals	Team
(Spain) Lolo González	30	Sariñena
(Mali) Samba Tounkara	23	Teruel
(Spain) José Carlos Gallego	18	Ejea
(Spain) Borja Berrendo	16	Sabiñánigo
(Spain) Edu García	16	Ebro

Top goalkeeper

Goalkeeper	Goals	Matches	Average	Team
(Spain) Alfredo Albero	20	29	0.69	Andorra

=== Group XVIII – Castilla-La Mancha ===
Location of teams of the 2014–15 Tercera División Group XVIII

Pos	Team	Pld	W	D	L	GF	GA	GD	Pts
1	Talavera de la Reina (P)	38	25	9	4	85	27	+58	84
2	Almansa	38	24	7	7	62	32	+30	79
3	Quintanar del Rey	38	21	12	5	48	19	+29	75
4	Manzanares	38	21	10	7	59	24	+35	73
5	Madridejos	38	20	12	6	43	21	+22	72
6	Villarrubia	38	17	14	7	50	35	+15	65
7	Marchamalo	38	17	8	13	55	51	+4	59
8	Mora	38	16	9	13	51	39	+12	57
9	Villarrobledo	38	15	9	14	58	49	+9	54
10	Puertollano	38	14	11	13	54	46	+8	53
11	Pedroñeras	38	14	9	15	45	37	+8	51
12	Toledo B	38	16	2	20	47	55	−8	50
13	Atlético Ibañés	38	12	12	14	42	40	+2	48
14	Albacete B	38	13	8	17	59	56	+3	47
15	Ciudad Real	38	13	7	18	47	57	−10	46
16	Almagro	38	11	11	16	43	44	−1	44
17	La Gineta	38	11	10	17	39	53	−14	43
18	Daimiel (R)	38	11	7	20	39	67	−28	40
19	Gimnástico (R)	38	2	5	31	21	117	−96	11
20	Hellín (D)	38	0	2	36	3	81	−78	0 (Note: Team deducted 2 points)

(D) Disqualified; (P) Promoted; (R) Relegated
Notes:

Top goalscorers

Goalscorers	Goals	Team
(Spain) Murci	27	Talavera de la Reina
(Spain) Daniel Cabanillas	21	Marchamalo
(Spain) Sergio Esteban	20	Daimiel
(Spain) Diego Buitrago	18	Villarrubia
(Argentina) Matías Saad	16	Quintanar del Rey

Top goalkeeper

Goalkeeper	Goals	Matches	Average	Team
(Spain) Ione Puga	19	37	0.51	Quintanar del Rey
