= Daniel Ruiz (disambiguation) =

Daniel Ruiz (born 1951) is a Spanish retired footballer who played as a striker.

Daniel Ruiz may also refer to:

- Daniel Ruiz La Rosa (1933-2024), Peruvian footballer
- Daniel Ruiz Robinson (born 1988), Mexican footballer
- Daniel Ruiz (footballer, born 2001), Colombian footballer
- Daniel Ruiz (motorcyclist) (born 1992), Spanish Grand Prix motorcycle racer
- Daniel Ruiz (field hockey) (born 1969), Argentine field hockey player
- Daniel Ruiz Posadas (born 1995), Spanish volleyball player

== See also ==
- Daniel Guillén Ruiz (born 1984), Spanish footballer
- Daniel Ávila Ruiz (born 1971), Mexican politician
