= Jaime Álvarez =

Jaime Álvarez may refer to:

- Jaime Álvarez Cisneros (born 1974), Mexican politician
- Jaime Álvarez (footballer) (born 1986), Spanish football manager and former player
- Jaime Álvarez Mendoza (born 1948), known as Jaque Mate, Mexican wrestler
