= Luciano González =

Luciano González may refer to:

Paternal name González

- Luciano González (footballer) (born 1981), Spanish footballer
- Luciano González (basketball) (born 1990; known as "Chuzito"), Argentine basketball player
- Luciano González (rugby union) (born 1997), Argentine rugby union player

Maternal name González

- Luciano D'Alessandro (born 1977), Venezuelan actor
- Luciano Pozo y Gonzalez (1915–1948; stagename: "Chano Pozo"), Cuban musician
