= Fernando Núñez =

Fernando Núñez may refer to:

- Fernando Núñez de Lara (1173-1129), Spanish count
- Fernando Núñez Sagredo (died 1639), Nicaraguan prelate
- Fernando Núñez (footballer, born 1978), Spanish footballer
- Fernando Núñez (footballer, born 1995), Argentine footballer
