= Javier Zurbano =

Spanish footballer (born 1980)

Javier Zurbano Lacalle (born 1 April 1980) is a Spanish former footballer who played as a striker.

== Early life ==
Zurbano was born in 1980 in Pamplona, Spain, and started playing football as a striker at a young age.

== Club career ==
Zurbano was known for his height, and was once the third-tallest player in professional Spanish football. In 2006, he signed for Spanish side Alaior, where he was the top scorer of the 2006–07 Tercera División with twenty-three goals. After that, he signed for Spanish side Peña Deportiva. In 2014, he signed for Spanish side Penya Ciutadella, where he was regarded as one of the club's most important players. He was the top scorer of the 2014–15 Tercera División with seventeen goals. Besides Spain, he played in Switzerland, Iceland, and Hong Kong.

== International career ==
Zurbano played for the Minorca national team.

== Style of play ==
Zurbano mainly operated as a striker and was described as an "old-fashioned nine". He is left-footed.

== Post-playing career ==
After retiring from professional football, Zurbano worked as a manager.

== Personal life ==
Zurbano has settled permanently in Menorca, Spain.
