= Luciano González (footballer) =

Spanish footballer (born 1981)

Luciano
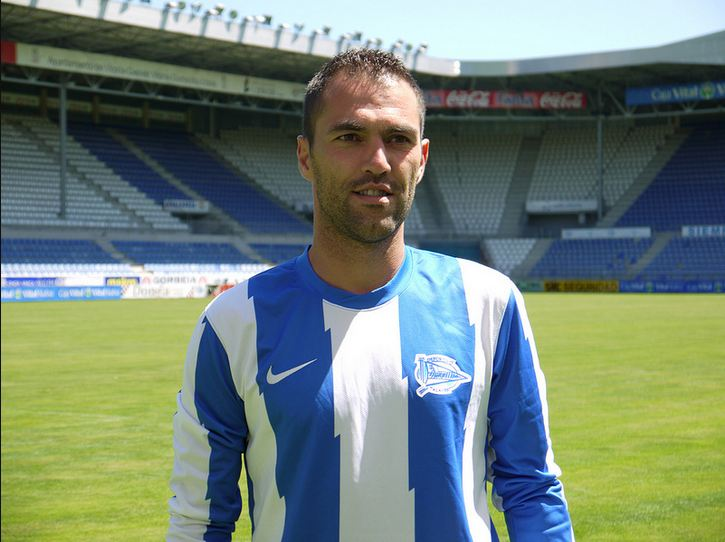
- Luciano being presented by Alavés

Personal information
- Full name: Luciano González Groba
- Date of birth: 23 April 1981 (age 45)
- Place of birth: Budiño, Spain
- Height: 1.82 m (6 ft 0 in)
- Position: Defender

Youth career
- Celta

Senior career*
Years	Team	Apps	(Gls)
2000–2004	Celta B	128	(7)
2004–2007	Pontevedra	70	(0)
2007–2009	Salamanca	15	(0)
2008	→ Pontevedra (loan)	7	(0)
2009–2010	Poli Ejido	25	(0)
2010–2012	Murcia	30	(0)
2012–2014	Alavés	49	(1)
2014–2016	Coruxo	13	(0)
2016–2017	Xuventude Sanxenxo	14	(3)
2018–2019	O Grove	26	(0)
2021–2022	Moraña	12	(0)
Total		389	(11)
- * Club domestic league appearances and goals

Luciano González Groba (born 23 April 1981), known simply as Luciano, is a Spanish former professional footballer who played as a right-back or a central defender.

He spent the vast majority of his career in the lower leagues. His Segunda División input consisted of 68 matches in four seasons, in representation of four clubs.

== Career ==
Born in Budiño, Pontevedra, Luciano grew in local RC Celta de Vigo's youth academy, but could only appear as a senior for their reserves. In 2004, he left and joined Galician neighbours Pontevedra CF, playing 28 Segunda División games in his first season, which ended in relegation; his debut in the competition for the latter took place on 28 August 2004, when he started and ended a 0–1 home loss against Polideportivo Ejido.

In the summer of 2007, Luciano signed for another team in the second division, UD Salamanca, appearing rarely in his first year and returning to his previous club on loan. In the 2008–09 campaign he featured more for the Castile and León team, but still took part in less than one and a half of the league matches.

Luciano competed in the Segunda División B the following campaigns. In July 2009 he moved to Poli Ejido and, in 2011, helped Real Murcia CF achieve promotion, following which he was deemed surplus to requirements by manager Iñaki Alonso.

Luciano earned another promotion to the second tier in 2012–13, now with Deportivo Alavés. The following season, he contributed 17 appearances to their survival, subsequently signing for Coruxo FC.

In the 2016 off-season, the 35-year-old Luciano moved to Xuventude Sanxenxo in the Galician regional leagues.
