= Chota (footballer) =

Spanish footballer

Personal information
- Full name: Mustafá Abdesalam Mohand
- Date of birth: 5 April 1975 (age 51)
- Place of birth: Melilla, Spain
- Height: 1.86 m (6 ft 1 in)
- Position: Striker

Youth career
- Peña Real Madrid

Senior career*
Years	Team	Apps	(Gls)
1994–1995	SC Constitución		
1995–1996	Real de Melilla		
1996–1997	Melilla B		
1997	Gimnástico Melilla		
1997–1998	Don Benito		
1998–1999	Alicante		
1999–2000	Dénia	29	(11)
2000	Gandía	8	(0)
2000–2002	Levante B	26	(7)
2002–2003	Levante	31	(5)
2003–2004	Numancia	12	(1)
2004	Hércules	12	(1)
2004–2015	Melilla	352	(82)
2015–2016	River Melilla	14	(4)
Total		484	(111)
- * Club domestic league appearances and goals

Mustafá Abdesalam Mohand (born 5 April 1975), known as Chota, is a Spanish former footballer who played as a striker.

He played mostly for Melilla in a 22-year senior career, appearing in 367 competitive games for the club and scoring 87 goals.

== Club career ==
Born in Melilla, Chota spent his first years as a senior in amateur football. He played part of the 2001–02 season and the entire 2002–03 campaign with Levante UD in the Segunda División, scoring his first goal in the competition on 13 January 2002 in a 1–1 home draw against Albacete Balompié. He also had a brief spell in that tier with CD Numancia.

Most of Chota's career, however, was spent with UD Melilla in the Segunda División B (which he first joined in 1996 in order to represent its reserves), going on to surpass the 300-mark in official matches and score more than 75 goals. He retired at the end of 2014–15 at the age of 40, amidst accusations of mistreatment.
