= José Jesús Lanza =

Spanish footballer

Personal information
- Full name: José Jesús Lanza Morilla
- Date of birth: 10 August 1978 (age 48)
- Place of birth: Córdoba, Spain
- Height: 1.80 m (5 ft 11 in)
- Position: Midfielder

Youth career
- Real Madrid

Senior career*
Years	Team	Apps	(Gls)
1997–1999	Córdoba B	52	(7)
1997–1998	→ Valladolid B (loan)	36	(9)
1999–2002	Levante	16	(0)
2000–2001	→ Burgos (loan)	34	(2)
2002	→ Cádiz (loan)	16	(2)
2002–2004	Ponferradina	69	(7)
2004–2006	Lanzarote	73	(9)
2006–2007	Lucentino Industrial		
2007–2009	Lucena	64	(4)
2009–2010	Peñarroya		
2010–2014	Lucena	140	(9)
2014–2016	Atlético Espeleño	59	(10)
2016–2017	Pozoblanco	24	(1)
- * Club domestic league appearances and goals

José Jesús Lanza Morilla (born 10 August 1978) is a Spanish former footballer who played as a midfielder.

== Club career ==
Born in Córdoba, Andalusia, Lanza made his senior debuts with Córdoba CF in the 1996–97 season, in Segunda División B. In 1999 summer he signed with Levante UD in Segunda División, playing his first game as a professional on 28 August by featuring 19 minutes in a 3–0 home win against UE Lleida.

After loan stints with Burgos CF and Cádiz CF, Lanza was released by the Valencian, and resumed his career in the lower levels, representing SD Ponferradina, UD Lanzarote, Lucentino Industrial, Lucena CF (two stints) and Peñarroya CF.
