= Jaime Álvarez Cisneros =

Mexican politician

- Born: 26 September 1974 (age 51); Morelos, Mexico
- Occupation: Politician
- Political party: MC

Jaime Álvarez Cisneros (born 26 September 1974) is a Mexican politician from the Citizens' Movement. From 2009 to 2012 he served as Deputy of the LXI Legislature of the Mexican Congress representing Morelos.
