= Xuventude Sanxenxo =

Spanish football club

- Full name: Club Xuventude Sanxenxo
- Founded: 1983
- Ground: Campo Municipal Baltar
- Chairman: Manuel Veiga Fontán
- Manager: Óscar García
- League: Tercera Futgal – Pontevedra
- 2025–26: Segunda Futgal – Pontevedra, 16th of 16 (relegated)
Home colours	Away colours

Club Xuventude Sanxenxo is a Spanish football team based in the municipality of Sanxenxo. Founded in 1983, they play in the Tercera Futgal – Pontevedra.

== Season to season ==
Season	Tier	Division	Place	Copa del Rey
1983–84	8	3ª Reg.		
1984–85	8	3ª Reg.	9th	
1985–86	8	3ª Reg.	2nd	
1986–87	7	2ª Reg.	15th	
1987–88	7	2ª Reg.	3rd	
1988–89	7	2ª Reg.	6th	
1989–90	7	2ª Reg.	9th	
1990–91	8	3ª Reg.	1st	
1991–92	7	2ª Reg.	16th	
1992–93	7	2ª Reg.	13th	
1993–94	7	2ª Reg.	5th	
1994–95	7	2ª Reg.	2nd	
1995–96	6	1ª Reg.	2nd	
1996–97	5	Reg. Pref.	1st	
1997–98	4	3ª	16th	
1998–99	4	3ª	19th	
1999–2000	5	Reg. Pref.	17th	
2000–01	6	1ª Reg.	13th	
2001–02	6	1ª Reg.	11th	
2002–03	6	1ª Reg.	4th	

Season	Tier	Division	Place	Copa del Rey
2003–04	6	1ª Reg.	7th	
2004–05	6	1ª Reg.	13th	
2005–06	6	1ª Reg.	12th	
2006–07	6	1ª Aut.	8th	
2007–08	6	1ª Aut.	2nd	
2008–09	5	Pref. Aut.	11th	
2009–10	5	Pref. Aut.	6th	
2010–11	5	Pref. Aut.	1st	
2011–12	4	3ª	20th	
2012–13	5	Pref. Aut.	5th	
2013–14	5	Pref. Aut.	2nd	
2014–15	4	3ª	18th	
2015–16	5	Pref.	10th	
2016–17	5	Pref.	14th	
2017–18	5	Pref.	7th	
2018–19	5	Pref.	7th	
2019–20	5	Pref.	13th	
2020–21	DNP			
2021–22	6	Pref.	11th	
2022–23	7	1ª Gal.	11th	

Season	Tier	Division	Place	Copa del Rey
2023–24	8	2ª Gal.	6th	
2024–25	8	2ª Futgal	5th	
2025–26	8	2ª Futgal		

- 4 seasons in Tercera División
