= Mustafá =

Algerian footballer

Personal information
- Full name: Mustafá Troncoso Espinar Azman Zeinha
- Date of birth: 8 April 1988 (age 38)
- Place of birth: Algeria
- Position: Winger

Team information
- Current team: Coria

Senior career*
Years	Team	Apps	(Gls)
2007–2008	Atlético Sanluqueño		
2008–2009	Coria	23	(2)
2009–2011	Alcalá	60	(8)
2011–2012	Mairena	38	(10)
2012–2015	San Roque	107	(23)
2015	Alcoyano	8	(0)
2016–2017	Villanovense	44	(6)
2017–2018	Mérida	19	(2)
2018	Melilla	12	(3)
2018–2020	Marbella	48	(5)
2020	UCAM Murcia	7	(0)
2021	Lorca Deportiva	10	(2)
2021	Ciudad de Lucena	12	(0)
2022	Valley United FC		
2022	Gerena	6	(0)
2023–	Coria	12	(0)

International career
- Western Sahara
- * Club domestic league appearances and goals

Mustafá Troncoso Espinar Azman Zeinha (born 8 April 1988) is a footballer who plays as a winger for Coria. Born in Algeria, he is a Western Sahara international.

== Early life ==
Mustafá was born in a Sahrawi refugee camp. He started playing football there at a young age and is known as Mustafá Azman or Mustafá Troncoso. He arrived in Spain at the age of eleven. He was taken in by Spanish foster parents as a child.

== Youth career ==
As a youth player, Mustafá joined the youth academy of Spanish side Coria.

== Senior club career ==
In 2011, he signed for Spanish side Mairena, where he was regarded as one of the attacking leaders of the team. Before signing for the club, he was regarded as an outstanding performer during the past few seasons. In 2012, he signed for Spanish side San Roque, where he was regarded as a fan favorite due to his humility and determination. In 2014, he was suspended for four games due to assaulting an opposing player. In 2015, he signed for Spanish side Alcoyano. In 2016, he signed for Spanish side Villanovense. He was regarded as one of the club's most important and beloved players and was known for his confidence and ability to cause problems for defenders. In 2017, he signed for Spanish side Mérida, where he was regarded as the club's most talented player and scored two goals in his first five appearances. In 2018, he signed for Spanish side Marbella, where he was regarded as a consistent performer and the difference-maker on the field, with defenders finding it difficult to take him on. He was regarded as one of the best players of the league and the season at the time. He made over fifty appearances for the club and was regarded to be one of their most important players and to have matured as a player. In 2020, he signed for Spanish side UCAM Murcia, where he was unable to establish himself in the team and receive consistent playing time.

== International career ==
Mustafá has played for the Western Sahara national football team and is one of the only Western Saharan players to have played professionally.

== Style of play ==
Mustafá is not regarded as a goalscorer and is known for his speed. He can operate as a left winger and right winger and is also known for his dribbling ability.

== Personal life ==
Mustafá has a sister.
