= Adrià Granell =

Spanish footballer

Personal information
- Full name: Adrià Granell Artal
- Date of birth: 13 March 1986 (age 40)
- Place of birth: Valencia, Spain
- Height: 1.69 m (5 ft 6 1/2 in)
- Position: Winger

Team information
- Current team: Atlético Saguntino

Youth career
- Valencia
- 2004–2005: Cracks

Senior career*
Years	Team	Apps	(Gls)
2005–2007	Villarreal C		
2007–2008	Catarroja	33	(3)
2008–2009	Zaragoza B	30	(9)
2009	Zaragoza	2	(0)
2009–2010	Alcoyano	45	(7)
2011–2013	Albacete	74	(7)
2013–2014	Huracán	37	(7)
2014–2015	Hércules	23	(1)
2015	Huracán	11	(1)
2016	Olímpic Xàtiva	17	(2)
2016–2017	Guijuelo	11	(1)
2017–2019	Atlético Saguntino	61	(8)
2019–2020	Vilamarxant	25	(1)
2020–2021	Gandía	23	(1)
2021–2022	Patacona	4	(0)
Total		396	(48)
- * Club domestic league appearances and goals

Adrià Granell Artal (born 13 March 1986 in Valencia) is a Spanish former footballer who played as a left winger.
