= Josu Esnaola =

Spanish professional footballer

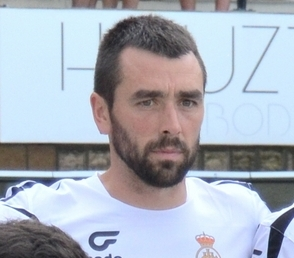
- Josu Esnaola Atxega

Personal information
- Full name: Josu Esnaola Atxega
- Date of birth: 31 October 1986 (age 40)
- Place of birth: Orio, Spain
- Height: 1.86 m (6 ft 1 in)
- Position: Defender

Senior career*
Years	Team	Apps	(Gls)
2005–2006	UPV		
2006–2009	Real Sociedad B	79	(0)
2009–2011	Real Sociedad	2	(0)
2010–2011	→ Real Unión (loan)	9	(1)
2011	→ Lanzarote (loan)	4	(0)
2011–2013	Noja	70	(5)
2013–2014	Sestao	40	(0)
2014–2019	Real Unión	165	(3)
- * Club domestic league appearances and goals

Josu Esnaola Atxega (born 31 October 1986) is a Spanish former professional footballer who played as a left back or a central defender.

== Club career ==
Born in Orio, Gipuzkoa, Esnaola made his debut as a senior with Universidad del Pais Vasco-EHU. In summer 2006 he moved to Real Sociedad, being assigned to the reserves in Segunda División B.

In the 2009 off-season, Esnaola was promoted to the Txuri-urdin first team who competed in Segunda División. He played his first match as a professional on 27 February 2010, starting in a 1–1 away draw against SD Huesca.

In August 2010, Esnaola was loaned to Real Unión in the third level. He was released by the club in January of the following year, subsequently returning to Real. In April, he moved to Tercera División's UD Lanzarote also in a temporary deal.

In July 2011, Esnaola joined SD Noja also in the fourth division. After two seasons (the first ending in promotion), he signed for Sestao River Club.

On 16 July 2014, Esnaola moved to another side in division three, Real Unión.
