= Daniel Webster Robinson House =

Historic house in Vermont, United States

- U.S. National Register of Historic Places
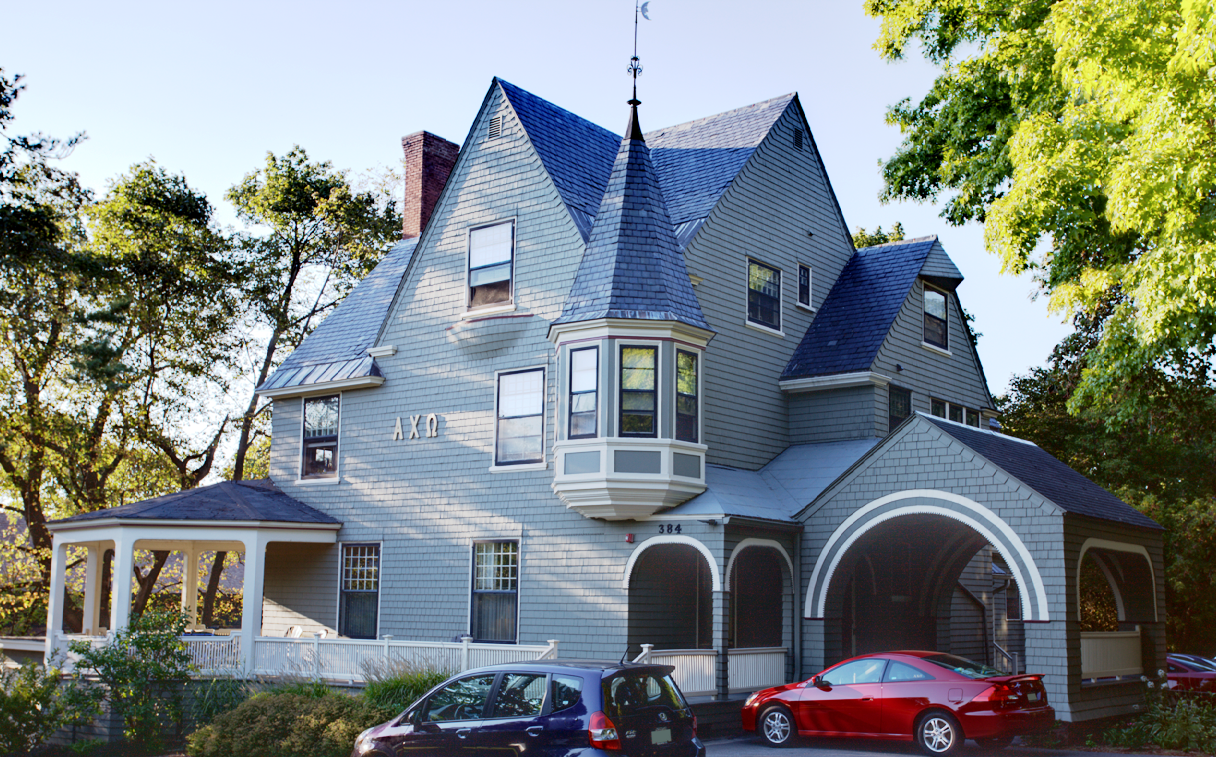
- as of 2013, Alpha Chi Omega Sorority of the University of Vermont

- Location within Vermont Location within the United States
- Location: 384 and 388 Main Street, Burlington, Vermont
- Coordinates: 44°28′35″N 73°12′13″W
- Area: 0.72 acres (0.29 ha)
- Built: 1885-1886
- Architect: Peabody and Stearns
- Architectural style: Shingle Style, transitional, including elements of Georgian, Queen Anne and Colonial styles
- NRHP reference No.: 82001701
- Added to NRHP: 17 May 1982

The Daniel Webster Robinson House is a historic house at 384-388 Main Street in Burlington, Vermont. It was designed by the Boston firm of Peabody and Stearns and built in 1885-1886 for prepared lumber magnate Daniel Webster Robinson. Since 1931 it has housed the Alpha Iota chapter of the Alpha Chi Omega sorority affiliated with the University of Vermont (UVM). It was listed on the National Register of Historic Places in 1982.

== Description and history ==
The Daniel Webster Robinson House stands on the north side of Main Street, just west of the main UVM campus, between South William and South Willard Streets. It is a three-story wood-frame structure, basically rectangular, with its massing obscured by a wealth of asymmetrical architecture typical of the Queen Anne period. The front facade features a low projecting turret on the second level at the right corner, with a wraparound porch that is open across most of the front, with a roofed corner pavilion at the left, and a covered porch on the right side that continues to a shingled porte-cochere with rounded opening. The front-facing cross gable of the main roof has a window set in it, below which is a corbel-like bulge. The interior of the building retains a significant amount of original woodwork and other decorative elements, despite its extended use as a sorority house. The period carriage house, which is also finely crafted, stands behind the main house, and has been converted to residential use.

The house was built in 1885-85 for Daniel Webster Robinson, then a leading force in one of Burlington's largest lumber companies. Robinson in 1897 bought out the remaining interests in the Barnes Company which he had been part-owner of since 1873. The house was designed by Peabody and Stearns of Boston, a major architectural firm of the period; it is one of the firm's significant works in Vermont.

== See also ==
- National Register of Historic Places listings in Chittenden County, Vermont
