= Daniel George Robinson =

British colonel in the Royal Engineers and the director-general of telegraphs in India

- Born: 8 March 1826
- Died: 27 July 1877 (aged 51)
- Occupations: Colonel in the Royal Engineers and the director-general of telegraphs in India

Daniel George Robinson (8 March 1826 – 27 July 1877) was a British colonel in the Royal Engineers and the director-general of telegraphs in India.

== Biography ==
Robinson was born 8 March 1826, and entered the military college of the East India Company at Addiscombe in 1841. He was appointed a second lieutenant in the Bengal engineers on 9 June 1843, and, after going through the usual course of instruction at Chatham, embarked for India in 1845. He arrived in time to join Sir Hugh Gough's army and take part in the Sutlaj campaign. He was engaged in the battle of Sobraon, and received the war medal. He was promoted first lieutenant on 16 June 1847. In 1848 and 1849 Robinson served in the Panjab campaign, and took part in the battles of Chillianwallah, 13 January 1849, and Gujerát, 21 February 1849, again receiving the war medal. In 1850 he was appointed to the Indian survey, upon which he achieved a great reputation for the beauty and exactitude of his maps. His maps of the Rawal Pindi and of the Gwalior country may be specially mentioned. He received the thanks of the government for his book, and the surveyor-general of India observed: ‘I have no hesitation in saying that these maps will stand in the first rank of topographical achievements in India, and I can conceive nothing superior to them executed in any country.’ On 21 November 1856 Robinson was promoted captain, and on 31 December 1862 lieutenant-colonel.

In 1865 Robinson was appointed director-general of Indian telegraphs. He entered on his duties at a critical time in the development of telegraphs. During the twelve years he was at the head of the department, the telegraphs, from a small beginning, spread over India, and were connected by overland and submarine lines with England. His zeal and activity, joined to great capacity for administration and organisation, enabled him to place the Indian telegraph department on a thoroughly efficient footing, and the lines erected were executed in the most solid manner. He took a leading part in the deliberations of the commission at Berne in 1871, and of the international conferences at Rome and St. Petersburg, on telegraphic communication. He was promoted to be brevet-colonel on 31 December 1867, and regimental colonel on 1 April 1874. He died on his way home from India on board the Peninsular and Oriental Company's steamer Travancore, at sea, on 27 July 1877.
