= Jony López =

Spanish footballer

Personal information
- Full name: Jonathan López Rodríguez
- Date of birth: 17 April 1987 (age 39)
- Place of birth: Oviedo, Spain
- Height: 1.80 m (5 ft 11 in)
- Position: Defender

Youth career
- 2002–2005: Sporting Gijón

Senior career*
Years	Team	Apps	(Gls)
2005–2010	Sporting Gijón B		
2006–2010	Sporting Gijón	16	(0)
2008–2009	→ Barcelona B (loan)	31	(0)
2011	Candás	?	(1)
- * Club domestic league appearances and goals

Jonathan 'Jony' López Rodríguez (born 17 April 1987) is a Spanish retired footballer. Mainly a central defender, he could also operate as a left back.

== Club career ==
López was born in Oviedo, Asturias. A product of Sporting de Gijón's youth academy, he made 16 Segunda División appearances over his first two professional seasons; that total included three in 2007–08, as the club returned to La Liga after ten years.

In the following campaign, López was loaned to FC Barcelona B who competed in the Segunda División B. He returned to the El Molinón in June 2009, and continued to play with the reserves until his release.

On 27 January 2011, after spending the first months of the season without a team, López signed with Candás CF from the Tercera División, coached by former Sporting player and B-side manager Abelardo Fernández. However, only a few months after arriving, he was forced to retire from football at the age of only 24, due to a serious neck injury he contracted whilst still with Sporting.
