= Edwin Congo =

Colombian footballer (born 1976)

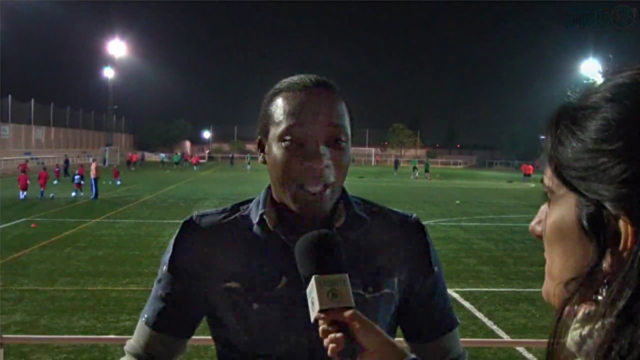

Personal information
- Full name: Edwin Arturo Congo Murillo
- Date of birth: 7 October 1976 (age 50)
- Place of birth: Bogotá, Colombia
- Height: 1.85 m (6 ft 1 in)
- Position: Forward

Senior career*
Years	Team	Apps	(Gls)
1996–1999	Once Caldas	110	(30)
1999–2002	Real Madrid	0	(0)
1999–2000	→ Valladolid (loan)	12	(1)
2000–2001	→ Vitória Guimarães (loan)	11	(4)
2001	→ Toulouse (loan)	8	(1)
2002–2006	Levante	112	(21)
2006–2007	Sporting Gijón	34	(11)
2007–2008	Recreativo	6	(0)
2008–2009	Olímpic Xàtiva	2	(3)
2009	Benissa		
2011	Paiporta		
Total		295	(71)

International career
1999–2004	Colombia	17	(3)
- * Club domestic league appearances and goals

Edwin Arturo Congo Murillo (born 7 October 1976) is a Colombian former professional footballer who played as a forward.

Basing his game in physical display, he played most of his professional career in Spain, appearing for a host of clubs in various league levels and amassing league totals of 164 matches and 33 goals (44 games and three goals in La Liga) over eight seasons.

== Club career ==
After impressive performances with Once Caldas, Bogotá-born Congo was acquired by La Liga club Real Madrid in 1999. However, he would not register one single league appearance for the capital side during his stay there (his only season was 2001–02), while also serving loans to Real Valladolid, Vitória S.C. and Toulouse FC.

Congo's most steady period in Spain, and abroad overall, was lived at Levante UD – two top flight promotions, with eight goals scored in the 2003–04 campaign – while he also netted 11 in 2006–07 for Sporting de Gijón also in the second division.

In 2007–08, Congo had an uneventful Spanish top flight stint with Recreativo de Huelva, being released at the end of the season. With the following campaign already started, he decided to join CD Olímpic de Xàtiva in the Valencian regional championships as he was residing in the area, while also trying to keep himself fit while waiting for an offer from a mid-to-high level team in Europe. He scored three times in his first two matches.

Congo retired from football in 2011, after another brief spell in amateur football also in Spain.

== International career ==
A Colombian international, Congo represented the nation at the 1999 and 2004 Copa América tournaments, being capped a total of 17 times.

== Personal life ==
In May 2020, Congo was arrested in Spain for his alleged part in a drugs trafficking operation. He denied accusations and was released after being questioned by Spanish police.
