= David Karanka =

Spanish footballer

Personal information
- Full name: David Karanka de la Hoz
- Date of birth: 20 April 1978 (age 48)
- Place of birth: Vitoria, Spain
- Height: 1.85 m (6 ft 1 in)
- Position: Striker

Youth career
- 1994–1997: Athletic Bilbao

Senior career*
Years	Team	Apps	(Gls)
1997–1998	Basconia	27	(15)
1998–2000	Bilbao Athletic	54	(17)
2000–2003	Athletic Bilbao	8	(1)
2000–2001	→ Extremadura (loan)	39	(13)
2002–2003	→ Murcia (loan)	36	(13)
2003–2005	Murcia	57	(8)
2005–2007	Sporting Gijón	40	(2)
2008	Real Unión	15	(3)
2008–2009	Sant Andreu	27	(5)
2009	Guijuelo	16	(1)
2010	Orihuela	11	(2)
2010–2013	Cieza	98	(62)
Total		428	(142)

International career
2003	Basque Country	1	(0)
- * Club domestic league appearances and goals

David Karanka de la Hoz (born 20 April 1978) is a Spanish former professional footballer who played as a striker.

He made 39 La Liga appearances over three seasons, scoring eight goals for Athletic Bilbao and Murcia. He added 141 matches and 29 goals in the Segunda División, in a 16-year senior career.

== Club career ==
Karanka was born in Vitoria-Gasteiz, Álava. The younger brother of Athletic Bilbao, Real Madrid and Colorado Rapids player Aitor Karanka, he was brought up at the Basque giants, and first appeared with the first team on 14 May 2000, playing 15 minutes in a 0–0 La Liga away draw against RCD Espanyol.

After a loan stint to CF Extremadura in 2000–01, where he scored 13 Segunda División goals, Karanka returned to Athletic, with virtually no impact (six games, although he scored once in a 3–2 thriller win at RC Celta de Vigo, as Bilbao trailed 2–0 with eight minutes remaining). He subsequently returned to the second tier, helping Real Murcia CF achieve promotion in 2002–03 by netting 13 goals and adding seven in next season's top flight – already as a permanent player after having been bought outright for €180,000– as the club returned to where it came from.

Two years later, Karanka transferred to fellow second-division side Sporting de Gijón where his form deteriorated, scoring only twice in 33 matches over two complete seasons. In January 2008 he joined Real Unión in Irun, moving in August to another Segunda División B team, UE Sant Andreu.

Karanka split the 2009–10 campaign between CD Guijuelo and Orihuela CF also in division three, totalling just three goals. Aged 32, he dropped down to the Tercera División and signed for CD Cieza.

Karanka went on to work as an assistant manager, starting out at Murcia then joining Nottingham Forest in July 2018. At the second of those clubs and the next, Birmingham City also of the English Championship, he worked under his brother Aitor.

== Honours ==
Basconia

- Tercera División: 1997–98

Murcia

- Segunda División: 2002–03
