= David Gascón =

Spanish footballer

Copito
Personal information
- Full name: David Gascón Cordero
- Date of birth: 11 April 1978 (age 48)
- Place of birth: Madrid, Spain
- Height: 1.80 m (5 ft 11 in)
- Position: Striker

Youth career
- CP Mérida

Senior career*
Years	Team	Apps	(Gls)
1998–2000	CP Mérida	6	(0)
2000	Cacereño	13	(1)
2000–2001	Benidorm	15	(2)
2001–2002	Jerez	29	(8)
2002–2003	Getafe	12	(1)
2003–2004	Jerez	25	(2)
2004–2005	Alcorcón	11	(0)
2005–2006	Tomelloso		
2006–2007	Torrevieja		
2007	Linense	2	(0)
2007	Motril		
2007–2008	Sangonera	32	(35)
2008–2009	Talavera		
2009	Villanovense		
2009–2010	Mérida UD		
2010–2012	Jerez		
2012–2016	Badajoz	95	(115)
- * Club domestic league appearances and goals

David Gascón Cordero (born 11 April 1978 in Madrid), known as Copito, is a Spanish former footballer who played as a striker.
