= Rubén Arroyo =

Spanish footballer

Personal information
- Full name: Rubén Arroyo Lloret
- Date of birth: 22 November 1983 (age 42)
- Place of birth: Madrid, Spain
- Height: 1.77 m (5 ft 9 1/2 in)
- Position: Forward

Youth career
- Real Madrid

Senior career*
Years	Team	Apps	(Gls)
2001–2005	Real Madrid C		
2001–2005	Real Madrid B	6	(1)
2005–2006	Universidad LP	9	(1)
2006–2008	Fuenlabrada	61	(9)
2008–2011	Lugo	98	(19)
2011–2013	Eibar	66	(7)
2013–2014	Ethnikos Achna	12	(3)
2014–2015	Guadalaraja	39	(8)
2015–2016	Toledo	21	(5)
2016–2017	Arandina	25	(1)
2017	Móstoles URJC	7	(0)
2018	Inter de Madrid	12	(2)
2018–2020	Parla	25	(2)
2020	Parla Escuela		
2023	Parla	2	(0)
- * Club domestic league appearances and goals

Rubén Arroyo Lloret (born 22 November 1983) is a Spanish former professional footballer who played as a forward.
