= Matías Saad =

Argentine footballer

Personal information
- Full name: Matías Federico Saad
- Date of birth: June 16, 1980 (age 46)
- Place of birth: Santa Fe, Argentina
- Height: 1.77 m (5 ft 10 in)
- Position: Forward

Team information
- Current team: Quintanar del Rey

Senior career*
Years	Team	Apps	(Gls)
2001	Unión Santa Fe	2	(0)
2002	Juventud Antoniana		
2002–2003	FC Lugano		
2003–2004	Nueva Chicago	14	(1)
2004–2005	Tiro Federal		
2005–2006	C.A.I		
2006–2007	San Martín Tucumán		
2007–2008	Instituto ACC		
2008–2009	Almagro	12	(2)
2009	Pontevedra	6	(0)
2010	Lucena	15	(7)
2010–2011	All Boys	2	(0)
2011–2012	Lucena	31	(8)
2012–2013	Cacereño	31	(7)
2013–2014	La Roda	31	(3)
2014–	Quintanar del Rey		
- * Club domestic league appearances and goals as of 17 May 2015

Matías Federico Saad (born June 16, 1980, in Santa Fe) is an Argentine professional footballer. He currently plays for Quintanar del Rey in Spain.

Previously, he played on the professional level in the Argentina Primera División for Unión de Santa Fe, Nueva Chicago and All Boys.
