= Daniel Ruiz Robinson =

Mexican footballer (born 1988)

Daniel Andrés Ruíz Robinson (born June 16, 1988, in Veracruz, Mexico) is a former Mexican footballer who played for El Tanque Sisley of the Primera Division in Uruguay.

== Teams ==
- (Mexico) Veracruz 2006–2008
- (Uruguay) El Tanque Sisley 2009–2010
- (Mexico) Mérida F.C. 2010–present
