= Samuel San José =

Spanish footballer

Samuel
Personal information
- Full name: Samuel San José Fernández
- Date of birth: 1 March 1984 (age 42)
- Place of birth: Santander, Spain
- Height: 1.78 m (5 ft 10 in)
- Position: Centre-back

Team information
- Current team: Escobedo (manager)

Youth career
- Rayo Cantabria
- Racing Santander

Senior career*
| Years | Team | Apps | (Gls) |
| 2003–2006 | Racing B | 31 | (4) |
| 2005–2008 | Racing Santander | 8 | (0) |
| 2006–2007 | → Sporting Gijón (loan) | 33 | (0) |
| 2008 | → Las Palmas (loan) | 21 | (0) |
| 2008–2011 | Las Palmas | 68 | (2) |
| 2011–2014 | Ponferradina | 90 | (1) |
| 2014–2015 | Racing Santander | 22 | (0) |
| 2015–2016 | Atlético San Luis | 16 | (0) |
| 2016–2017 | Llagostera | 34 | (1) |
| 2017–2020 | Formentera | 89 | (2) |
| 2020–2023 | Escobedo | 67 | (0) |
| Total | | 479 | (10) |

Managerial career
- 2023–: Escobedo
- * Club domestic league appearances and goals

Samuel San José Fernández (born 1 March 1984), known simply as Samuel or Samu for short, is a Spanish former professional footballer who played as a central defender, currently manager of UM Escobedo.

== Club career ==
Born in Santander, Cantabria, Samu was a product of his hometown club Racing de Santander's youth system. He first appeared for its main squad on 11 September 2005, in a 0–1 home loss against Cádiz CF. He finished the season with seven appearances (all but one were complete matches) and four yellow cards, as the Cantabria side finished 17th in La Liga and narrowly avoided relegation.

After having served a season-long loan stint with Sporting de Gijón in the Segunda División, Samuel returned to Racing but, midway through the 2007–08 campaign, would be loaned again, alongside teammate Christian Fernández, to second-tier strugglers UD Las Palmas. Both would be instrumental in helping the Canarians retain their league status.

Subsequently, Christian returned to Santander but Samu stayed, signing for three years with the option for a further one. He appeared in an average of 23 games the following three seasons, with his team always managing to stay afloat in division two.

Samuel then alternated between the second division and the Segunda División B, representing SD Ponferradina and Racing Santander and achieving promotion with the former in 2012. He spent 2015–16 in the Mexican Ascenso MX, with Atlético San Luis.

After returning to his home country, Samu saw out his career at age 39, playing lower-league and amateur football with UD Llagostera, SD Formentera and UM Escobedo.

== Coaching career ==
Samu was named manager of his last club immediately after retiring. On 19 May 2024, having achieved promotion to Segunda Federación as group winners, he renewed his contract for a further year.

== Managerial statistics ==
As of match played 12 April 2025

Managerial record by team and tenure
| Team | Nat | From | To | Record | | | | | | | | Ref |
| Team | Nat | From | To | G | W | D | L | GF | GA | GD | Win % | Ref |
|---|---|---|---|---|---|---|---|---|---|---|---|---|
| Escobedo | (Spain) | 16 June 2023 | Present | 69 | 31 | 18 | 20 | 84 | 71 | +13 | 44.93 | |
| Career total | | | | 69 | 31 | 18 | 20 | 84 | 71 | +13 | 44.93 | — |
