= Jaime Álvarez (footballer) =

Spanish footballer (born 1986)

Personal information
- Full name: Jaime Álvarez Díaz
- Date of birth: 4 February 1986 (age 40)
- Place of birth: Oviedo, Spain
- Height: 1.73 m (5 ft 8 in)
- Position: Winger

Youth career
- Oviedo

Senior career*
Years	Team	Apps	(Gls)
2005–2009	Oviedo	63	(10)
2005–2007	→ Universidad Oviedo (loan)	72	(15)
2009–2011	Universidad Oviedo	67	(19)
2011–2015	Covadonga	131	(52)
2015–2017	Caudal	66	(19)
2017–2021	Covadonga	122	(50)
Total		521	(165)

Managerial career
- 2020–2021: Covadonga (youth)
- 2021–2024: Oviedo B
- 2024–2025: Gimnástica Torrelavega
- * Club domestic league appearances and goals

Jaime Álvarez Díaz (born 4 February 1986) is a Spanish football manager and former player who played as a winger.

== Playing career ==
Álvarez was born in Oviedo, Asturias, and was a Real Oviedo youth graduate. He made his senior debut while on loan at Tercera División side CD Universidad de Oviedo in 2005, helping in their promotion to Segunda División B before renewing his loan for another season.

Back at Oviedo for the 2007–08 campaign, Álvarez featured regularly before returning to the Uni in 2009, now on a permanent contract. In 2011, he moved to fellow fourth tier side CD Covadonga, scoring a career-best 23 goals in his first season.

Álvarez joined Caudal Deportivo also in the fourth division in June 2015, achieving promotion to the third level in his first campaign. On 12 June 2017, he returned to Cova, and was a regular starter for the side until leaving on 29 June 2021.

== Managerial career ==
In 2020, while still a player, Álvarez joined Covadonga's backroom staff, and was named manager of their Juvenil A squad. On 29 June 2021, he was appointed manager of Oviedo's reserves in Tercera División RFEF.

On 3 June 2022, after achieving promotion to Segunda Federación, Álvarez renewed his contract for a further year. On 16 October, he was named interim manager of the main squad as Bolo was sacked, but returned to his previous role two days later after the appointment of Álvaro Cervera.

On 8 April 2024, Álvarez was sacked by Vetusta following a poor run of results which saw the side in the relegation places, with four games left to play.

== Managerial statistics ==
As of match played 7 April 2024

Managerial record by team and tenure
Team	Nat	From	To	Record								Ref
Team	Nat	From	To	G	W	D	L	GF	GA	GD	Win %	Ref
Oviedo B	(Spain)	29 June 2021	8 April 2024	102	45	21	36	145	118	+27	44.12	
Total				102	45	21	36	145	118	+27	44.12	—
