= Fernando Núñez (footballer, born 1978) =

Spanish footballer

Personal information
- Full name: Fernando Núñez Lázaro
- Date of birth: 28 June 1978 (age 48)
- Place of birth: Barcelona, Spain
- Height: 1.69 m (5 ft 7 in)
- Position: Defender

Youth career
- Espanyol

Senior career*
Years	Team	Apps	(Gls)
1998–2000	Espanyol B	30	(5)
1999	Espanyol	0	(0)
2000–2004	Figueres	109	(2)
2004–2005	Mataró		
2005–2009	Europa		
2009–2015	Prat	158	(1)
2015–2016	Martinenc	15	(0)
2016–2017	Sant Cugat	4	(0)
- * Club domestic league appearances and goals as of 03:45, 20 July 2021 (UTC)

Fernando Núñez Lázaro (born 28 June 1978), often known simply as Fernando, is a Spanish retired footballer who played as a defender.

== Club career ==
Born in Barcelona, Catalonia, Núñez graduated from RCD Espanyol's youth system, making his senior debuts with the reserves in the 1998–99 season, in Segunda División B. On 24 July 1999 he appeared in his first and only game as a professional, playing the last 34 minutes in a 1–2 away loss against Montpellier HSC for the UEFA Intertoto Cup.

In the following years, Núñez competed in his native region and the lower leagues, representing UE Figueres, CE Mataró, CE Europa and AE Prat.
