= Jairo Álvarez =

Spanish footballer (born 1986)

Jairo Alvárez
Personal information
- Full name: Jairo Alvárez Gutiérrez
- Date of birth: 21 March 1986 (age 40)
- Place of birth: Avilés, Spain
- Height: 1.80 m (5 ft 11 in)
- Position: Midfielder

Youth career
- 1999–2003: Oviedo

Senior career*
Years	Team	Apps	(Gls)
2002–2004	Oviedo B		
2002	Oviedo	2	(0)
2004–2006	Sporting B	25	(3)
2006–2007	Sporting Gijón	17	(2)
2007–2010	Deportivo La Coruña B	12	(1)
2008	→ Alavés (loan)	10	(1)
2008–2009	→ Lorca Deportiva (loan)	33	(2)
2010–2011	Palencia	21	(1)
2011–2012	Zamora	51	(8)
2012–2013	Melilla	37	(3)
2013–2014	Guadalajara	20	(2)
2014	Cacereño	15	(0)
2014–2015	UCAM Murcia	6	(0)
2015	Avilés	14	(0)
Total		263	(23)

International career
2001–2002	Spain U16	5	(1)
2002	Spain U17	2	(0)
- * Club domestic league appearances and goals

Jairo Álvarez Gutiérrez (born 21 March 1986 in Avilés, Asturias), sometimes known simply as Jairo, is a Spanish former footballer who played as a midfielder.
