= Dani Guillén =

Spanish footballer

Personal information
- Full name: Daniel Guillén Ruiz
- Date of birth: 1 October 1984 (age 42)
- Place of birth: Plasencia, Spain
- Height: 1.76 m (5 ft 9 in)
- Position: Left back

Youth career
- Las Rozas

Senior career*
Years	Team	Apps	(Gls)
2004–2006	Real Madrid C		
2006–2008	Real Madrid B	22	(0)
2008–2010	Benidorm	62	(1)
2010–2011	Sant Andreu	36	(0)
2011–2012	Hospitalet	20	(0)
2012–2013	Atlético Baleares	37	(0)
2013–2015	Burgos	66	(1)
2015–2016	Fuenlabrada	30	(0)
2016–2017	Internacional Madrid	24	(2)
- * Club domestic league appearances and goals

Daniel "Dani" Guillén Ruiz (born 1 October 1984) is a Spanish former footballer who played as a left back.

== Club career ==
Born in Plasencia, Province of Cáceres, Guillén was signed by Real Madrid from another club in the capital, amateurs Las Rozas CF, first representing Real Madrid C. In the 2006–07 season, he made his debut for the B-team in the second division, playing 17 matches as they were relegated; the following year, he contributed even less.

Released by Real Madrid in 2008, Guillén resumed his career in the third level, first with Benidorm CF then UE Sant Andreu, CE L'Hospitalet, CD Atlético Baleares, Burgos CF and CF Fuenlabrada.
