= 2009–10 FC Cartagena season =

FC Cartagena
2009–10 season
- Chairman: Francisco Gómez
- Manager: Juan Ignacio Martínez Jiménez
- Liga Adelante: 5th
- Copa del Rey: Third Round
- Top goalscorer: League: Toché (20); All: Toché (22)
Home colours	Away colours	Third colours

The 2009–10 Spanish football season is FC Cartagena's first season ever in Liga Adelante.

== Trophies Balance ==
Category	Trophy	Started round	First match	Result	Last match
Friendly Trophy	Carabela de Plata Trophy	Final	August 13, 2009	Winner	August 13, 2009
Friendly Trophy	Trofeo Costa Cálida	Group Stage^{1}	August 16, 2009	Winner	August 16, 2009
Competitive	Liga Adelante	—	August 29, 2009	5th	June 19, 2010
Competitive	Copa del Rey	Second Round	September 2, 2009	Third Round	October 7, 2009

== Summer Transfers ==
=== In ===
Player	From	Fee
(Spain) Santi Santos	(Spain) Cultural Leonesa	Free
(Spain) Víctor	(Spain) Real Valladolid	Free
(Spain) Tonino	(Spain) Alcoyano	Free
(Spain) Rafael Clavero	(Spain) Tenerife	Free
(Spain) Javi Casas	(Spain) Athletic Bilbao	Free
(Spain) Antonio Longás	(Spain) FC Barcelona B	Free
(Spain) Unai Expósito	(Spain) Hércules	Free
(Spain) Chus Herrero	(Spain) Real Zaragoza	Free
(Spain) Ánder Lafuente	(Spain) Granada CF	Free
(Spain) Pablo Ruiz	(Spain) Córdoba	Free
(Spain) Quique De Lucas	(Spain) Real Murcia	Free
(France) Pascal Cygan	(Spain) Villarreal CF	Free
(Panama) Alberto Quintero	(Spain) Torrellano CF	Free
(Spain) Toché	(Spain) Albacete	Free

=== Out ===
Player	New Team
(Spain) Nano González	(Spain) Cádiz
(Spain) Juan Viyuela	(Spain) Alicante
(Spain) Armando	(Spain) FC Barcelona B
(Spain) Leo Gómez	(Spain) Cartagena FC
(Spain) Mena	(Spain) Real Jaén
(Spain) Raúl Aguilar	(Spain) AD Ceuta
(Spain) Juan Cabrejo	(Spain) Cerceda

=== Loan in ===
Player	From
(Spain) Óscar Sielva	(Spain) RCD Espanyol

=== Loan end ===
Player	Returns to
(Spain) Carlos Carmona	(Spain) RCD Mallorca
(Spain) Miquel Roqué	(England) Liverpool Reserves and Academy; Liverpool F.C. sold him to Real Betis, in which B team is currently playing
(Brazil) Addison	(Spain) Hércules

== Winter Transfers ==
=== In ===
Player	From	Fee
(Peru) Juan Diego González-Vigil	(Peru) Alianza Lima	Free
(Spain) Juan Carlos Moreno	(Spain) Numancia	Free

=== Out ===
Player	New Team	Fee
(Spain) Santi Santos	(Spain) Cultural Leonesa	Free
(Spain) Juan Pablo	(Spain) Valencia Mestalla	Free

=== Loan in ===
Player	From
(France) Franck Signorino	(Spain) Getafe
(Spain) Xabier Etxeita	(Spain) Athletic Bilbao
(Equatorial Guinea) Javier Ángel Balboa	(Portugal) Benfica

=== Loan end ===
Player	Team
(Spain) Óscar Sielva	(Spain) RCD Espanyol

== Current squad ==
Note: Flags indicate national team as defined under FIFA eligibility rules; some limited exceptions apply. Players may hold more than one non-FIFA nationality.

No.	Pos.	Nation	Player
1	GK	ESP	Rubén Martínez
2	DF	FRA	Pascal Cygan
3	DF	ESP	Javi Casas
4	DF	ESP	Txiki
5	DF	ESP	Rafael Clavero
6	MF	ESP	Mariano Sánchez
7	DF	ESP	Chus Herrero
8	MF	ESP	Héctor Yuste
9	FW	ESP	Toché
10	MF	ESP	Antonio Longás
11	MF	ESP	Ánder Lafuente
12	DF	FRA	Franck Signorino (on loan from Getafe)
13	GK	ESP	Juan Castilla

No.	Pos.	Nation	Player
14	MF	EQG	Javier Ángel Balboa (on loan from Benfica)
15	FW	PAN	Alberto Quintero
16	MF	ESP	Miguel Falcón
17	MF	ESP	Tonino
18	FW	ESP	Jesús Tato
19	MF	ESP	Juan Carlos Moreno
20	DF	ESP	Xabier Etxeita (on loan from Athletic Bilbao)
21	FW	ESP	Víctor
22	MF	ESP	Quique De Lucas
23	DF	ESP	Unai Expósito
24	DF	ESP	Pablo Ruiz
25	FW	PER	Juan Diego Gonzalez-Vigil

== Match results ==
- All times are in CET/CEST

=== Pre-season ===
==== Friendly matches ====
5 August 2009	FC Cartagena-La Unión (Spain)	0 – 2	FC Cartagena	La Manga del Mar Menor (Murcia)^{2}
			Pablo Ruiz; Gonzalo

8 August 2009	Jumilla CF (Spain)	1 – 2	FC Cartagena	La Manga del Mar Menor (Murcia)^{2}
	Carmona	(Report)	Víctor; Willy

15 August 2009	Caravaca CF (Spain)	2 – 2	FC Cartagena	A. M. El Morao, Caravaca de la Cruz (Murcia)
22:00	Olivares 28', (yellow card); Dioni 72'; Noel (yellow card); San José (yellow card); Yoni (yellow card)	(Report)	6' (o.g.) Bustillo; 20', (yellow card) Quintero; (yellow card) Tonino	Attendance: 500

19 August 2009	Crevillente (Spain)	0 – 5	FC Cartagena	Enrique Miralles, Crevillent (Alicante)
			Tato; Víctor; De Lucas; Quintero; Santi Santos

August 2009	Águilas (Spain)	2 – 3	FC Cartagena	El Rubial, Águilas (Murcia)
			, De Lucas; Tato

==== Carabela de Plata Trophy ====
13 August 2009 Final	FC Cartagena	3 – 1	Tenerife	Cartagonova, Cartagena (Murcia)
22:00	Víctor 51' (pen.), 57'; Longás 64'; Tato (yellow card)	(Report)	5' Aorán	Attendance: 4,500; Referee: Francisco Ramón Hevia Obras

==== Trofeo Costa Cálida ====
This edition was celebrated in San Javier^{2}.

Team	Pld	W	D	L	GF	GA	GD	Pts
(Spain) FC Cartagena	2	1	1	0	2	0	+2	4
(Spain) Villajoyosa	2	0	2	0	0	0	0	2
(Spain) Mar Menor	2	0	1	1	0	2	−2	1

16 August 2009 Group Stage^{1}	Mar Menor (Spain)	0 – 2	FC Cartagena	San Javier Municipal Ground, San Javier (Murcia)^{2}
			27' Tato; 37' Quintero

16 August 2009 Group Stage^{1}	Villajoyosa (Spain)	0 – 0	FC Cartagena	San Javier Municipal Ground, San Javier (Murcia)^{2}

=== Liga Adelante ===
Matchday	1	2	3	4	5	6	7	8	9	10	11	12	13	14	15	16	17	18	19	20	21	22	23	24	25	26	27	28	29	30	31	32	33	34	35	36	37	38	39	40	41	42
Result against	GIR	RYV	RUN	CAS	BET	VilB	CÁD	CEL	ELC	LPA	RMU	NÀS	RSO	SDH	NUM	SAL	LEV	CÓR	HÉR	RHU	ALB	GIR	RYV	RUN	CAS	BET	VilB	CÁD	CEL	ELC	LPA	RMU	NÀS	RSO	SDH	NUM	SAL	LEV	CÓR	HÉR	RHU	ALB
Venue	A	H	A	H	A	H	A	H	A	H	A	H	A	H	A	H	A	H	A	H	A	H	A	H	A	H	A	H	A	H	A	H	A	H	A	H	A	H	A	H	A	H
Position	7	2	1	1	1	2	1	1	2	1	1	1	2	3	3	5	3	3	4	3	3	3	3	3	3	3	3	3	4	4	3	2	3	4	3	3	3	5	5	5	5	5
Goal Average (useful in case of tie)^{3}																						Won	Won	Won	Won	Lost	D	Won	Lost	Lost	Won	Won	Lost	Lost	Won	D	Lost	Lost	Won	Lost	D	Lost

		All							Home					Away				
		Pts	W	D	L	F	A	Dif.	W	D	L	F	A	W	D	L	F	A
5	FC Cartagena	65	18	11	13	59	48	11	10	5	6	34	27	8	6	7	25	21

Promoted to Liga BBVA 2010–11
Relegated to Segunda División B 2010–11

Biggest win
Home				Away			
31 October 2009	Matchday 10	v. UD Las Palmas	4 – 1	November 8, 2009	Matchday 11	v. Real Murcia	1 – 4
30 January 2010	Matchday 22	v. Girona	4 – 1	November 8, 2009	Matchday 11	v. Real Murcia	1 – 4
12 March 2010	Matchday 28	v.	4 – 1	November 8, 2009	Matchday 11	v. Real Murcia	1 – 4
Biggest loss
Home				Away			
19 June 2010	Matchday 42	v.	0 – 4	10 January 2010	Matchday 19	v. Hércules	2 – 0

29 August 2009	Girona	0 – 1	FC Cartagena	Montilivi, Girona
18:00	Tortolero (yellow card) 34'; Ratón (yellow card) 45'; Martínez (yellow card) 61'; Peragón (yellow card) 75'	(Report)	7' De Lucas; (yellow card) 24' Clavero; (yellow card) 31' Mariano; (yellow card) 49' Cygan; (yellow card) 86' Txiki	Referee: Santiago Jaime Latre

5 September 2009	FC Cartagena	2 – 0	Rayo Vallecano	Cartagonova, Cartagena (Murcia)
18:00	Toché 29'; De Lucas (yellow card) 58'; Txiki (yellow card) 72'; Tato 90+2'	(Report)	(yellow card) 5' (yellow-red card) 47' Movilla; (yellow card) 33' Coke; (yellow card) 78' Albácar; (yellow card) 85' Reyes; (yellow card) 87' Piti; (red card) 90+1' Ángel	Attendance: 9,000; Referee: Jesús Gil Manzano

12 September 2009	Real Unión	1 – 1	FC Cartagena	Stadium Gal, Irún (Guipúzcoa)
16:00	Descarga (yellow card) 13'; Goikoetxea 20'; Gabaraín (yellow card) 23'; Alcalá (yellow card) 62'	(Report)	14' (pen.), (yellow card) 34' Víctor; (yellow card) 67' Txiki	Attendance: 3,500; Referee: Daniel Jesús Trujillo Suárez

19 September 2009	FC Cartagena	2 – 1	Castellón	Cartagonova, Cartagena (Murcia)
18:00	De Lucas 4'; Lafuente 10'; Mariano (yellow card) 75'	(Report) ^{4}	6' Ulloa; (yellow card) 38' Palanca; (yellow card) 47' Uranga; (yellow card) 58' Enguix; (yellow card) 80' Baigorri; (yellow card) 82' Pendín	Attendance: 9,000; Referee: Antonio Israel Mariscal Sánchez ^{4}

27 September 2009	Real Betis	0 – 0	FC Cartagena	Ruiz de Lopera, Sevilla
12:00	Pavone (yellow card) 30'; Arzu (yellow card) 36' (yellow-red card) 54'; Damià (yellow card) 38'; Emana (yellow card) 60'; García (red card) 75'	(Report)	(yellow card) 44' Rubén; (yellow card) 50' Mariano; (yellow card) 57' Ruiz	Referee: Alfonso Pino Zamorano

3 October 2009	FC Cartagena	0 – 0	Villarreal B	Cartagonova, Cartagena (Murcia)
16:00	Tato (yellow card) 30'; De Lucas (yellow card) 65'; Txiki (yellow card) 71'; Clavero (yellow card) 75'	(Report)	(yellow card) 14' Juan Carlos; (yellow card) 21' Mario; (yellow card) 39' Tomás; (yellow card) 43' Catalá	Referee: José Ramón Piñeiro Crespo

11 October 2009	Cádiz	1 – 3	FC Cartagena	Ramón de Carranza, Cádiz
21:00	Ogbeche (yellow card) 20'; López Silva (yellow card) 54'; Fragoso (yellow card) 56'; Cristian (yellow card) 71'; López (yellow card) 73'; Toedtli 79'; Silva (yellow card) 87'	(Report)	32' Toché; 44' De Lucas; 46' Víctor	Attendance: 10,000; Referee: Antonio Pérez Riverol

17 October 2009	FC Cartagena	1 – 1	Celta Vigo	Cartagonova, Cartagena (Murcia)
18:00	Lafuente (yellow card) 20'; Víctor 28' (pen.); Ruiz (yellow card) 37'; Cygan (yellow card) 58'	(Report)	(yellow card) 11' (yellow-red card) 62' Michu; 49', (yellow card) 60' Abalo; (yellow card) 67' López Garai; (yellow card) 73' Mallo; (yellow card) 74' Aspas; (yellow card) 80' Falcón; (yellow card) 81' Aarón	Attendance: 10,000; Referee: Mario Melero López

25 October 2009	Elche	1 – 1	FC Cartagena	Martínez Valero, Elche (Alicante)
17:00	Crespí (yellow card) 12'; Santos (yellow card) 43'; Navarro (yellow card) 48' (yellow-red card) 80'; Molina 54'; Acciari (yellow card) 61'; Wakaso (yellow card) 90'	(Report)	(yellow card) 14' Txiki; (yellow card) 26' De Lucas; 48' Toché; (yellow card) 50' Mariano	Attendance: 8,802; Referee: Pedro Jesús Pérez Montero

31 October 2009	FC Cartagena	4 – 1	UD Las Palmas	Cartagonova, Cartagena (Murcia)
18:00	De Lucas 33', (yellow card) 61'; Tato (yellow card) 40'; Expósito 72'; Toché 76'; Víctor 80'	(Report)	28' Márquez; (yellow card) 63' Samuel; (yellow card) 89' Darino	Attendance: 10,000; Referee: Julio Amoedo Chas

8 November 2009	Real Murcia	1 – 4	FC Cartagena	Nueva Condomina, Murcia
12:00	Rosas (yellow card) 5'; Sergio (yellow card) 44' (red card) 81'; Isaac 61'; Pereyra (yellow card) 76'	(Report)	3', (yellow card) 23' De Lucas; 4', 81', (yellow card) 4' Víctor; (yellow card) 22', (goal) 25' Toché; (yellow card) 28' Longás; (yellow card) 60' (yellow-red card) 67' Mariano	Attendance: 21,766; Referee: José Antonio Teixeira Vitienes

15 November 2009	FC Cartagena	0 – 2	Gimnàstic	Cartagonova, Cartagena (Murcia)
19:00	Herrero (yellow card) 21'; Clavero (yellow card) 64'; Quintero (yellow card) 89'	(Report)	(yellow card) 7' Miguel Ángel; 22', (yellow card) 68' Campano; 41' José Mari; (yellow card) 44' Cherfa; (yellow card) 85' Cruz	Attendance: 11,652; Referee: Carlos Del Cerro Grande

22 November 2009	Real Sociedad	1 – 0	FC Cartagena	Anoeta, San Sebastián (Guipúzcoa)
12:00	Bueno (yellow card) 43'; Ansotegui (yellow card) 44'; Agirretxe 89'	(Report)	(yellow card) 26' Mariano; (yellow card) 43' (yellow-red card) 55' Cygan; (yellow card) 87' Expósito	Attendance: 20,000; Referee: Alejandro Hernández Hernández

28 November 2009	FC Cartagena	1 – 0	SD Huesca	Cartagonova, Cartagena (Murcia)
18:00	Longás (yellow card) 20'; Víctor (yellow card) 43'; Marrero 44' (o.g.); De Lucas (yellow card) 65'	(Report)	(yellow card) 21' Rubiato; (yellow card) 28' Marrero; (yellow card) 35' Rico; (yellow card) 58' Vicente	Attendance: 9,000; Referee: Francisco Javier Ontanaya López-Astilleros

5 December 2009	Numancia	2 – 1	FC Cartagena	Los Pajaritos, Soria
18:00	Barkero (yellow card) 12'; Vélez 24', 38'; Guréndez (yellow card) 67'; Jaio (yellow card) 69'	(Report)	(yellow card) 38' Tonino; (yellow card) 81' Longás; (yellow card) 87' Herrero; 89' Toché	Attendance: 1,000; Referee: Jesús Gil Manzano

13 December 2009	FC Cartagena	3 – 4	UD Salamanca	Cartagonova, Cartagena (Murcia)
12:00	Falcón (yellow card) 29'; Toché 30', 71', (yellow card) 87'; Pablo Ruiz (yellow card) 56'; Tato 74', (yellow card) 82'	(Report)	21' Quique; (yellow card) 34' Leal; 49' Rossato; 65' Linares; (yellow card) 75' Sevilla; 88' Despotović; (yellow card) 89' Ribas	Attendance: 10,500; Referee: Vicente José Lizondo Cortés

19 December 2009	Levante UD	1 – 2	FC Cartagena	Ciutat de València, Valencia
18:00	Serra (yellow card) 22'; Javi Guerra (yellow card) 66'; Ángel (yellow card) 72'; Rubén 80'	(Report)	(yellow card) 20' Lafuente; 44' Toché; 58', (yellow card) 69' Expósito; (yellow card) 60' Longás; (yellow card) 83' Tonino; (yellow card) 83' Víctor; (yellow card) 89' Héctor Yuste	Attendance: 3,654; Referee: José Luis Lesma López

2 January 2010	FC Cartagena	0 – 0	Córdoba	Cartagonova, Cartagena (Murcia)
18:00		(Report)	(yellow card) 19' Gaspar; (yellow card) 81' Gerardo; (yellow card) 89' Simon	Attendance: 10,000; Referee: Ignacio Iglesias Villanueva

10 January 2010	Hércules	2 – 0	FC Cartagena	José Rico Pérez, Alicante
12:00	Tiago Gomes (yellow card) 40'; Dănciulescu 43'; Farinós (yellow card) 56'; Calatayud (yellow card) 85'; Delibašić 90+1'	(Report)	(yellow card) 20' Txiki; (yellow card) 48' Toché; (yellow card) 61' De Lucas; (yellow card) 70' Expósito; (yellow card) 82' Mariano	Referee: Mario Melero López

17 January 2010	FC Cartagena	1 – 0	Recreativo Huelva	Cartagonova, Cartagena (Murcia)
17:00	Víctor 13' (pen.); Clavero (yellow card) 27'; Expósito (yellow card) 44'; Longás (yellow card) 52'; Falcón (yellow card) 82'; Mariano (yellow card) 87'	(Report)	(yellow card) 5' Poli; (yellow card) 12' Troest; (yellow card) 12' (yellow-red card) 90+4' Aitor; (yellow card) 23' Carmona; (yellow card) 62' Vázquez; (yellow card) 66' Pablo Sánchez	Attendance: 9,564; Referee: Antonio Pérez Riverol

23 January 2010	Albacete	0 – 0	FC Cartagena	Carlos Belmonte, Albacete
18:00	Sales (yellow card) 25'; López Ramos (yellow card) 46'; Sousa (yellow card) 47'; Tarantino (yellow card) 48' (yellow-red card) 87'	(Report)	(yellow card) 35' Txiki; (yellow card) 41' Rubén; (yellow card) 50' Mariano	Attendance: 6,065; Referee: Carlos Del Cerro Grande

30 January 2010	FC Cartagena	4 – 1	Girona	Cartagonova, Cartagena (Murcia)
18:00	De Lucas (yellow card) 23', (goal) 39', 62'; Lafuente 34', 50'; Mariano (yellow card) 64'	(Report)	30' Matamala; (yellow card) 46' Galán; (yellow card) 56' Almirón	Attendance: 9,356; Referee: Antonio Israel Mariscal Sánchez

7 February 2010	Rayo Vallecano	2 – 3	FC Cartagena	Teresa Rivero, Madrid
17:00	Tito (yellow card) 28', (goal) 39'; Aganzo (yellow card) 32'; Arribas 37'; Castro (yellow card) 58'; Cuadrado (yellow card) 78'	(Report)	25' Lafuente; 30' Toché; (yellow card) 35' Expósito; (yellow card) 39' Héctor Yuste; (yellow card) 72', (red card) 84' Moreno; 76' Txiki	Attendance: 12,000; Referee: Andrés Manuel Ceballos Silva

13 February 2010	FC Cartagena	1 – 0	Real Unión	Cartagonova, Cartagena (Murcia)
18:00	Longás (yellow card) 13'; Mariano (yellow card) 53'; De Lucas 68'; Falcón (yellow card) 78'; Clavero (yellow card) 80'	(Report)	(yellow card) 12' Montoro; (yellow card) 39' Beobide; (yellow card) 49' Alcalá; (yellow card) 74' Gurrutxaga	Attendance: 6,000; Referee: Pedro Jesús Pérez Montero

20 February 2010	Castellón	2 – 2	FC Cartagena	Castalia, Castellón
18:00	Ulloa 21', (yellow card) 65'; Mantecón 24', (yellow card) 88'; César Martín (yellow card) 37'; Ortiz (yellow card) 90'	(Report)	39' Txiki; 77' De Lucas	Attendance: 5,563; Referee: David Miranda Torres

28 February 2010	FC Cartagena	1 – 2	Real Betis	Cartagonova, Cartagena (Murcia)
12:00	Tato 75'; Clavero (yellow card) 78'; Cygan (yellow card) 88'	(Report)	5' Pereira; 49' Mehmet Aurélio; (yellow card) 54' Melli; (yellow card) 76' Damià; (yellow card) 89' Vega	Attendance: 12,283; Referee: Santiago Jaime Latre

6 March 2010	Villarreal B	0 – 0	FC Cartagena	Ciudad Deportiva, Vila-Real (Castellón)
18:00	Gullón (yellow card) 3'; Catalá (yellow card) 10'	(Report)	(yellow card) 49' Moreno; (yellow card) 51' Toché; (yellow card) 56' Clavero; (yellow card) 62' Mariano	Attendance: 1,500; Referee: Antonio Israel Mariscal Sánchez

12 March 2010	FC Cartagena	4 – 1	Cádiz	Cartagonova, Cartagena (Murcia)
21:00	Cygan (yellow card) 25'; Toché 57', 75'; Víctor 64'; De Lucas 80'	(Report)	6' Abraham; (yellow card) 13' López; (yellow card) 22' Silva; (yellow card) 66' López Silva	Attendance: 9,528; Referee: Alejandro Hernández Hernández

20 March 2010	Celta	1 – 0	FC Cartagena	Balaídos, Vigo (Pontevedra)
18:00	Jonathan Vila (yellow card) 23'; Trashorras 32'; Bustos (yellow card) 66'; Abalo (yellow card) 67'; Fernandez (yellow card) 79'; Aspas (yellow card) 87'	(Report)	(yellow card) 61' Clavero; (yellow card) 70' Tato; (yellow card) 81' Víctor; (yellow card) 88' Etxeita; (yellow card) 89' Cygan	Attendance: 8,321; Referee: Gorka Gardeazábal Gómez

28 March 2010	FC Cartagena	0 – 2	Elche	Cartagonova, Cartagena (Murcia)
12:00	De Lucas (red card) 63'; Etxeita (red card) 66'; Txiki (yellow card) 67'	(Report)	11' Molina; (yellow card) 35' Usero; (yellow card) 49' Tena; (yellow card) 58' Acciari; (yellow card) 69' Generelo; (yellow card) 84' Crespí; (yellow card) 88' Ripa; 90+4' Perera	Attendance: 10,000; Referee: Mario Melero López

3 April 2010	UD Las Palmas	0 – 1	FC Cartagena	Est. Gran Canaria, Las Palmas (Canary Islands)
18:00 (Spain time); 17:00 (Local time)	León (yellow card) 44'; Samuel (yellow card) 47'; David González (yellow card) 56'; Darino (yellow card) 59'	(Report)	(yellow card) 42' Falcón; 48' (pen.) Víctor; (yellow card) 51' Expósito; (yellow card) 53' Signorino	Attendance: 7,032; Referee: Pedro Jesús Pérez Montero

11 April 2010	FC Cartagena	3 – 2	Real Murcia	Cartagonova, Cartagena (Murcia)
12:00	Toché 12', 67' (pen.); Txiki (yellow card) 27'; De Lucas 64'; Rubén (yellow card) 89'	(Report)	19', (yellow card) 38' Chando; (yellow card) 50' Isaac; (yellow card) 54' De Coz; (yellow card) 66' Mejía; 76' Pedro; (yellow card) 84' Capdevila	Attendance: 15,105; Referee: Jesús Gil Manzano

17 April 2010	Nàstic Tarragona	3 – 2	FC Cartagena	Nou Estadi, Tarragona
18:00	Mingo (yellow card) 19'; Campano 65', 70'; Miguel Ángel (yellow card) 78'; Navarro 82'; Cruz (yellow card) 90+1'	(Report)	(yellow card) 5' Signorino; (yellow card) 44' Etxeita; (yellow card) 45' De Lucas; 63' Lafuente; (yellow card) 64' Txiki; (yellow card) 68' Mariano; (yellow card) 70' Víctor; 84' Expósito	Referee: José Ramón Piñeiro Crespo

25 April 2010	FC Cartagena	1 – 1	Real Sociedad	Cartagonova, Cartagena (Murcia)
12:00	Mariano (yellow card) 2'; Chus Herrero 17'; Signorino (yellow card) 21'; Etxeita (yellow card) 37'; Expósito (yellow card) 77'	(Report)	4', (yellow card) 18' (yellow-red card) 51' Aranburu; (yellow card) 43' Rivas; (yellow card) 62' Martínez	Referee: José Antonio Teixeira Vitienes

1 May 2010	SD Huesca	0 – 2	FC Cartagena	El Alcoraz, Huesca
18:00	Helguera (yellow card) 57'; Corona (yellow card) 59'; Sastre (yellow card) 81'	(Report)	(yellow card) 48' Signorino; 58' (pen.) De Lucas; (red card) 61' Etxeita; 84' Toché	Referee: Francisco Ramón Hevia Obras

8 May 2010	FC Cartagena	2 – 1	Numancia	Cartagonova, Cartagena (Murcia)
18:00	Txiki (yellow card) 44'; Toché 74', 83'; Cygan (yellow card) 78'; Falcón (yellow card) 81'; Rubén (yellow card) 90+1'	(Report)	(yellow card) 30' Nagore; (yellow card) 34' Óscar López; 53' Nano; (yellow card) 90' Pavón	Referee: Ignacio Iglesias Villanueva

15 May 2010	UD Salamanca	1 – 0	FC Cartagena	El Helmántico, Villares de la Reina
18:00	Linares (yellow card) 23', (goal) 58'; Leal (yellow card) 44'; Goikoetxea (yellow card) 55'; Toti (yellow card) 74'; Ribas (yellow card) 79'; Sevilla (yellow card) 86'	(Report)	(yellow card) 25' Longás; (red card) 53' Cygan	Referee: Carlos del Cerro Grande

22 May 2010	FC Cartagena	3 – 5	Levante UD	Cartagonova, Cartagena (Murcia)
18:00	Txiki (yellow card) 11' (yellow-red card) 46'; Falcón (yellow card) 28'; Mariano 32', (yellow card) 68'; Víctor 36', (yellow card) 85'; González-Vigil (yellow card) 44'; Signorino (yellow card) 59'; Toché 84'	(Report)	5', 58' Robusté; (yellow card) 23' (yellow-red card) 79' Juanfran; (yellow card) 34' Cendrós; (yellow card) 40', (goal) 55' Rubén; (yellow card) 47' Miguel; 68', 70' Guerra; (yellow card) 72' Iborra	Referee: José Antonio Teixeira Vitienes

29 May 2010	Córdoba	1 – 2	FC Cartagena	Nuevo Arcángel, Córdoba
20:00	Carpintero (yellow card) 51'; Scotti (yellow card) 53'; Gaspar (yellow card) 62'; Asen 69' (pen.); Rueda (red card) 89'	(Report)	(yellow card) 31' Víctor; 38', 55' Toché; (yellow card) 68' Falcón	Referee: Julio Amoedo Chas

6 June 2010	FC Cartagena	0 – 0	Hércules	Cartagonova, Cartagena (Murcia)
21:00	Mariano (yellow card) 85'	(Report)		Referee: David Miranda Torres

13 June 2010	Recreativo Huelva	1 – 0	FC Cartagena	Nuevo Colombino, Huelva
18:00	Tornavaca (yellow card) 21'; Braulio 46'; Bouzón (yellow card) 80'	(Report)	(yellow card) 56' Falcón	Referee: Jesús Gil Manzano

19 June 2010	FC Cartagena	0 – 4	Albacete	Cartagonova, Cartagena (Murcia)
18:00		(Report)	24' Sales; 25' Hidalgo; 30' Stuani; 42' Antonio López; (yellow card) 44' Blanco	Referee: Vicente José Lizondo Cortés

=== Copa del Rey ===
==== Second Round ====
2 September 2009	FC Cartagena	2 – 2; 3 – 2 (A.E.T.)	Elche	Cartagonova, Cartagena (Murcia)
21:30	Toché (yellow card) 27', (goal) 79', 110'; Expósito (yellow card) 40'; Herrero (red card) 75'; Héctor Yuste (yellow card) 85'; Crespí 90+1' (o.g.)	(Report)	34' Molina; (yellow card) 35', (goal) 76' (pen.) Jandro; (yellow card) 47' Generelo; (yellow card) 52' Carleto; (yellow card) 61' Navarro; (yellow card) 78' Rubio	Attendance: 8,000; Referee: David Miranda Torres

==== Third Round ====
7 October 2009	UD Salamanca	2 – 0	FC Cartagena	El Helmántico, Villares de la Reina
20:45	Lombán (yellow card) 43'; Jurado (yellow card) 49'; Toti 52'; Sevilla 71'; Goikoetxea (yellow card) 86'	(Report)	(yellow card) 11' Tato; (yellow card) 20' Expósito; (yellow card) 43' Herrero; (yellow card) 68' Santi Santos	Attendance: 4,401; Referee: Alejandro Hernández Hernández

== Others ==
=== El Derbi de la Región de Murcia ===
This is the name which receives the match played between Real Murcia and FC Cartagena, because it is a match between two teams of the same autonomous community (Región de Murcia) that is played by the first time in the history with these team's names, because some derbis were played in Segunda División B when FC Cartagena was Cartagonova CF (the last one was in the 1999–2000 season).

In the first match of this season, FC Cartagena beat for 1–4, the biggest win away for the club cartagenero.

8 November 2009	Real Murcia	1 – 4	FC Cartagena	Nueva Condomina, Murcia
12:00	Rosas (yellow card) 5'; Sergio (yellow card) 44', (red card) 81'; Isaac 61'; Pereyra (yellow card) 76'	(Report)	3', (yellow card) 23' De Lucas; 4', 81', (yellow card) 4' Víctor; (yellow card) 22', (goal) 25' Toché; (yellow card) 28' Longás; (yellow card) 60' (yellow-red card) 67' Mariano	Attendance: 21,766; Referee: José Antonio Teixeira Vitienes

In second match, FC Cartagena confirms its aspirations of promotion to Liga BBVA qualifying second and Real Murcia remains debilitated in the middle-low positions of the table.

11 April 2010		3 – 2	Real Murcia	Cartagonova, Cartagena (Murcia)
12:00	Toché 12', 67' (pen.); Txiki (yellow card) 27'; De Lucas 64'; Rubén (yellow card) 89'	(Report)	19', (yellow card) 38' Chando; (yellow card) 50' Isaac; (yellow card) 54' De Coz; (yellow card) 66' Mejía; 76' Pedro; (yellow card) 84' Capdevila	Attendance: 15,105; Referee: Jesús Gil Manzano

== Notes ==
1: Costa Cálida is a triangular trophy.
2: Neutral venue.
3: The team that wins this variable ranked ahead of another with the same points but lost on goal average. If the goal average is drawn between two or more teams and, at the end of the season these teams have the same points, the overall Liga Adelante's goal average prevails over this goal average.
4: As Murcia press assured during the week, the referee had made a mistake drafting the report and writing the goal scorers because he wrote that the first goal scorer for Castellón scored first and was an alternate who was on the bench (Pol Bueso), and that the FC Cartagena's second goal was an own goal scored by César Martín fifteen minutes later than it really was. For the Liga Adelante's official goals account, the goals were scored by the players that here appear.
