= Jony Álamo =

Spanish footballer

Personal information
- Full name: Jonathan Carmona Álamo
- Date of birth: 25 September 2001 (age 25)
- Place of birth: La Unión, Spain
- Height: 1.75 m (5 ft 9 in)
- Position: Midfielder

Team information
- Current team: Algeciras
- Number: 20

Youth career
- La Unión
- 2017–2020: Elche

Senior career*
Years	Team	Apps	(Gls)
2019–2023	Elche B	18	(1)
2020–2023	Elche	4	(0)
2022	→ Cultural Leonesa (loan)	11	(0)
2023–2024	Cartagena B	1	(0)
2023–2024	Cartagena	18	(0)
2024–2025	Marbella	17	(0)
2025–	Algeciras	33	(0)
- * Club domestic league appearances and goals as of 10 June 2026

Jonathan Carmona "Jony" Álamo (born 25 September 2001) is a Spanish professional footballer who plays as a central midfielder for Primera Federación club Algeciras.

== Club career ==
Born in La Unión, Region of Murcia, Álamo joined Elche CF's youth setup from CD La Unión. On 15 December 2019, he made his senior debut with the reserves by coming on as a second-half substitute in a 3–2 Tercera División away win against UD Benigànim.

On 19 February 2020, Álamo renewed his contract until 2022. On 21 June, after being one of the youngsters called up to the first team by manager Pacheta after the COVID-19 pandemic, he further extended his contract until 2023.

Álamo made his professional debut with the Franjiverdes on 27 June 2020, replacing Dani Escriche late into a 1–1 away draw against UD Las Palmas in the Segunda División. He made his La Liga debut on 19 January of the following year, starting in a 2–2 away draw against Real Valladolid.

On 13 January 2022, Álamo moved on loan to Primera División RFEF side Cultural y Deportiva Leonesa until the end of the season. On 24 June 2023, he signed a one-year contract with another reserve team, FC Cartagena B in Segunda Federación.

On 3 July 2024, Álamo signed for Marbella FC in the third division. The following January, despite being regularly used, he terminated his link with the club.
