= Adrián Sanmartín =

Spanish footballer (born 2005)

Personal information
- Full name: Adrián Sanmartín Ayala
- Date of birth: 28 July 2005 (age 21)
- Place of birth: Cartagena, Spain
- Height: 1.75 m (5 ft 9 in)
- Position: Forward

Team information
- Current team: Cartagena B

Youth career
- Cartagena
- 2017–2019: Valencia
- 2019–2022: Cartagena

Senior career*
| Years | Team | Apps | (Gls) |
| 2022–2024 | Cartagena B | 14 | (1) |
| 2022–2024 | Cartagena | 2 | (0) |
| 2024 | Elche Ilicitano | 7 | (0) |
| 2024–2025 | Deportivo Marítimo | 10 | (0) |
| 2025 | Minera | 3 | (0) |
| 2025– | Cartagena B | 3 | (0) |
- * Club domestic league appearances and goals as of 28 September 2025

Adrián Sanmartín Ayala (born 28 July 2005) is a Spanish professional footballer who plays as a forward for Tercera Federación club Cartagena B.

== Club career ==
Born in La Puyola, Cartagena, Region of Murcia, Sanmartín began his career with hometown side FC Cartagena before joining Valencia CF in 2017. He returned to the Efesé in 2019, overcoming three serious injuries before making his senior debut with the reserves on 23 January 2022, playing the last five minutes in a 3–1 Tercera División RFEF home win over FC La Unión Atlético.

On 9 May 2022, Sanmartín renewed his contract with Cartagena. He made his first team debut on 26 September, replacing Jairo Izquierdo late into a 1–1 home draw against Deportivo Alavés in the Segunda División.
