= Pepe Aguilar (footballer) =

Spanish footballer

Personal information
- Full name: José Manuel Aguilar González
- Date of birth: 28 January 1970 (age 56)
- Place of birth: Madrid, Spain
- Height: 1.80 m (5 ft 11 in)
- Position: Winger

Team information
- Current team: Cartagena B (manager)

Youth career
- Racing Santander

Senior career*
Years	Team	Apps	(Gls)
1989–1990	Racing B		
1990–1994	Racing Santander	40	(2)
1994	→ Racing Ferrol (loan)	20	(5)
1994–1995	Cacereño	36	(2)
1995–1996	Recreativo	34	(3)
1996–1997	Cádiz	36	(2)
1997–1999	Granada	73	(14)
1999–2000	Mérida	10	(0)
2000–2002	Murcia	88	(15)
2002–2005	Ciudad Murcia	105	(18)
2005–2006	Lorca Deportiva	10	(1)
2006–2007	La Unión	?	(11)
2007–2008	Ciudad Lorquí	31	(4)
Total		483	(77)

Managerial career
- 2009: Sangonera Atlético (assistant)
- 2011: Leganés (assistant)
- 2011–2014: Atlético Perines (youth)
- 2014–2020: Racing Santander (youth)
- 2020: Cartagena B
- 2020–2021: Cartagena
- 2021–: Cartagena B
- * Club domestic league appearances and goals

José Manuel "Pepe" Aguilar González (born 28 January 1970) is a Spanish retired footballer who played as a left winger, and is the coach of FC Cartagena B.

== Playing career ==
Born in Madrid, Aguilar was raised in Santander, Cantabria and was a Racing de Santander youth graduate. After making his senior debut with the reserves, he first appeared with the main squad during the 1990–91 season, achieving promotion from Segunda División B.

Aguilar made his professional debut on 15 September 1991, playing the last nine minutes in a 0–1 Segunda División home loss against Real Betis. In January 1994, after being rarely used, he moved to third division side Racing de Ferrol on loan for the remainder of the campaign.

Aguilar subsequently represented third tier sides CP Cacereño, Recreativo de Huelva, Cádiz CF and Granada CF before returning to the second division in 1999, with CP Mérida. In January 2000, after featuring sparingly, he moved to Real Murcia, and scored the winner in a 1–0 away success over former side Granada in the last match of the play-offs on 25 June, which ensured his side's promotion to division two.

In 2002, after being a regular starter for Murcia, Aguilar signed for neighbouring Ciudad de Murcia in the third tier, again achieving promotion in his first season. In 2005, he joined Lorca Deportiva CF in the second level, but featured rarely.

Aguilar left Lorca in 2006, and played for Tercera División sides CD La Unión and CA Ciudad de Lorquí. In September 2008, after helping the latter achieve promotion to the third division, he retired at the age of 38.

== Managerial career ==
In 2009, Aguilar was named Rafa Muñoz's assistant at Sangonera Atlético CF in the third division. In January 2011, he rejoined Muñoz's staff at CD Leganés, but left the side in the following month.

In July 2011, Aguilar was appointed manager of Club Atlético Perines' Juvenil C squad, while also working for the Cantabrian Football Federation. In July 2014, he returned to one of the clubs he represented as a player, Racing Santander, to work as a Cadete A manager.

Aguilar was named in charge of Racing's Juvenil A squad in 2017. On 31 July 2020, he was appointed at the helm of FC Cartagena's reserves in the fourth division.

On 18 December 2020, Aguilar was named interim manager of the main squad after the dismissal of Borja Jiménez. Four days later, the club announced he would continue as first team manager.

On 11 January 2021, Aguilar returned to the B-side, after three matches with the main squad.

== Managerial statistics ==
As of 13 April 2024

Managerial record by team and tenure
Team	Nat	From	To	Record								Ref
Team	Nat	From	To	G	W	D	L	GF	GA	GD	Win %	Ref
Cartagena B	(Spain)	31 July 2020	18 December 2020	8	4	4	0	16	5	+11	50.00	
Cartagena	(Spain)	18 December 2020	11 January 2021	3	0	1	2	2	6	−4	0.00	
Cartagena B	(Spain)	11 January 2021	Present	121	44	34	43	150	135	+15	36.36	
Total				132	48	39	45	168	146	+22	36.36	—
