= Txiki (footballer, born 1979) =

Spanish footballer

Personal information
- Full name: Cristian Urbistondo López
- Date of birth: 14 August 1979 (age 47)
- Place of birth: Barcelona, Spain
- Height: 1.77 m (5 ft 10 in)
- Position: Centre-back

Youth career
- Europa

Senior career*
Years	Team	Apps	(Gls)
1998–2000	Europa	66	(4)
2000–2003	Sabadell	59	(0)
2003–2004	Girona	29	(2)
2004–2006	Sabadell	54	(0)
2006–2007	Villanueva	34	(5)
2007–2008	Ceuta	37	(0)
2008–2012	Cartagena	117	(2)
2012–2013	Girona	8	(0)
2013–2014	La Unión	5	(1)
2014–2015	Pinatar	26	(4)
2015–2016	La Unión	26	(3)
2016–2018	Mar Menor	65	(6)
2018–2019	Lorca Deportiva	21	(2)
2019	Teruel	9	(0)
2019–2020	Los Garres	21	(0)
2020–2022	Archena Sport	36	(1)
2022–2023	Molinense	13	(1)
2024	Algar	11	(0)
- * Club domestic league appearances and goals as of 18:31, 16 April 2025 (UTC)

Cristian Urbistondo López (born 14 August 1979), known as Txiki, is a Spanish footballer who plays as a central defender.

== Club career ==
Born in Barcelona, Catalonia, Txiki spent the vast majority of his extensive senior career in the lower leagues, starting out at CE Europa in his native region. From 2009 to 2013 he competed in the Segunda División, in representation of FC Cartagena and Girona FC.

After winning promotion with Cartagena, Txiki made his professional league debut on 29 August 2009, playing the entire 1–0 away win against Girona and being booked. He scored the first of two goals in the second tier on 7 February 2010, in a 3–2 victory at Rayo Vallecano.

In the Segunda División B, Txiki appeared for CE Sabadell FC (two spells), Girona, CD Villanueva, AD Ceuta and CD Teruel, signing for the latter club at the age of 39.
