= Isaac Jové =

Spanish footballer (born 1980)

Personal information
- Full name: Isaac Jové Rubí
- Date of birth: 21 February 1980 (age 46)
- Place of birth: Barcelona, Spain
- Height: 1.74 m (5 ft 9 in)
- Position: Attacking midfielder

Team information
- Current team: Deportivo Marítimo (assistant)

Youth career
- San Ginés
- Cartagonova

Senior career*
Years	Team	Apps	(Gls)
1999–2003	Ciudad Murcia	14	(1)
2001–2002	→ Udinese (loan)	0	(0)
2003	→ Logroñés (loan)	8	(0)
2003–2004	Lorca Deportiva CF	41	(3)
2004–2005	Almería	31	(2)
2005–2007	Lorca Deportiva CF	55	(4)
2007–2009	Salamanca	75	(9)
2009–2012	Murcia	98	(8)
2012–2013	Iraklis	36	(6)
2013–2014	Niki Volos	34	(10)
2014–2015	Orihuela	14	(2)
2015	CF Lorca Deportiva	4	(3)
Total		410	(48)

Managerial career
- 2015–2017: CF Lorca Deportiva (assistant)
- 2017–2019: Algar
- 2019: Niki Volos
- 2021: Veraguas
- 2022: Badajoz
- 2025–: Deportivo Marítimo (assistant)
- * Club domestic league appearances and goals

Isaac Jové Rubí (born 21 February 1980) is a Spanish football manager and former player who played as an attacking midfielder. He is the currently the assistant coach of Deportivo Marítimo.

He amassed Segunda División totals of 227 matches and 20 goals over seven seasons, mainly in representation of Lorca Deportiva, Salamanca and Murcia (two years apiece).

== Playing career ==
Born in Barcelona, Catalonia, Jové started his career with newly created Ciudad de Murcia, winning promotion from Tercera División in 2001. Afterwards, he was loaned to Udinese Calcio in Italy, but did not appear in one single game for the club, being posteriorly loaned to CD Logroñés.

Jové then played one season each with Lorca Deportiva CF in the Segunda División B and UD Almería in the Segunda División, returning to the former after they promoted to the second level. He was an undisputed starter in his second year, but the Murcian side were relegated.

Subsequently, Jové stayed in his country's division two, representing UD Salamanca and Real Murcia. He finished his professional career at the age of 34, after two seasons with as many teams in the Greek second tier.

== Post-retirement ==
After retiring, Jové spent two years as an assistant manager at CF Lorca Deportiva. On 8 June 2017, he was named head coach of amateurs CD Algar.

In June 2024, Jové was presented as the 'general director' of the newly established club Deportivo Marítimo. Following the sacking of Manuel Palomeque in January 2025, the club's assistant manager, Juan Molina, was promoted to head coach, and Jové was hired as assistant manager.
