= Palomeque (surname) =

Palomeque is a surname. Notable people with the surname include:

- Cristian Palomeque (born 1994), Colombian footballer
- Diego Palomeque (born 1993), Colombian sprinter
- Ezequiel Palomeque (born 1992), Colombian footballer
- Fernando Palomeque (born 1968), Mexican football player and manager
- Flor María Palomeque (born 1979), Ecuadorian actress, dancer, and model
- Karen Palomeque (born 1994), Colombian Paralympic athlete
- Lincoln Palomeque, Colombian actor
- Manuel Palomeque (born 1967), Spanish footballer
- Mathías Palomeque (born 1986), Uruguayan rugby player
- Rubén Palomeque (born 1980), Spanish steeplechase runner
- Rubén Palomeque (footballer) (born 1994), Spanish footballer
