= Miguel Falcón =

Spanish footballer

Personal information
- Full name: Miguel Falcón García-Ramos
- Date of birth: 24 April 1979 (age 47)
- Place of birth: Toledo, Spain
- Height: 1.83 m (6 ft 0 in)
- Position: Midfielder

Team information
- Current team: Villarrobledo (manager)

Youth career
- Atlético Madrid

Senior career*
Years	Team	Apps	(Gls)
1997–2000	Atlético Madrid C	58	(5)
1999–2001	Atlético Madrid B	25	(0)
2001–2002	Mérida	29	(2)
2002–2003	Leganés	9	(1)
2003–2007	Ciudad Murcia	124	(6)
2007–2008	Granada 74	30	(0)
2008–2010	Cartagena	55	(0)
2010–2012	Oviedo	35	(0)
2012–2013	Toledo	25	(0)
Total		390	(14)

Managerial career
- 2014–2018: Toledo (assistant)
- 2018: Toledo
- 2022–2023: Toledo (assistant)
- 2024–2025: Toledo
- 2025–: Villarrobledo
- * Club domestic league appearances and goals

Miguel Falcón García-Ramos (born 24 April 1979) is a Spanish former professional footballer who played as a central midfielder. He is currently manager of Tercera Federación club Villarrobledo.

He amassed Segunda División totals of 185 games and six goals over eight seasons, in representation of five clubs.

== Playing career ==
Falcón was born in Toledo, Castilla–La Mancha. After rough starts in Madrid, only appearing for Atlético's B and C teams, he joined another club in the city, CD Leganés, but appeared rarely during a sole season. Subsequently, staying in the Segunda División, he stabilised his career, going on to spend five campaigns with Ciudad de Murcia – they were renamed Granada 74 CF for 2007–08.

Following Granada's 2008 relegation, Falcón signed for FC Cartagena of Segunda División B, helping them promote in his first year. He contributed 29 league games the following campaign as the Murcia side overachieved for a final fifth place.

In July 2010, aged 31, Falcón returned to the third tier after moving to Real Oviedo. Two years later, he signed with his hometown club CD Toledo in the Tercera División.

== Coaching career ==
Falcón retired at the end of the 2012–13 season – in which Toledo won promotion – and became assistant manager. When Onésimo Sánchez was dismissed in January 2018, he was named head coach. In June, after being unable to prevent relegation, he was given a job in the club's academy.

== Managerial statistics ==
As of 24 March 2018

Managerial record by team and tenure
Team	Nat	From	To	Record								Ref
Team	Nat	From	To	G	W	D	L	GF	GA	GD	Win %	Ref
Toledo	(Spain)	24 January 2018	Present	9	4	2	3	9	8	+1	44.44	
Career Total				9	4	2	3	9	8	+1	44.44	—
