= Javier Casas (footballer, born 1982) =

Spanish footballer

Personal information
- Full name: Javier Casas Cuevas
- Date of birth: 9 May 1982 (age 44)
- Place of birth: Bilbao, Spain
- Height: 1.81 m (5 ft 11 in)
- Position: Left-back

Youth career
- 1997–1998: Arenas Getxo
- 1998–2000: Athletic Bilbao

Senior career*
Years	Team	Apps	(Gls)
2000–2001	Basconia	11	(2)
2001–2004	Bilbao Athletic	73	(3)
2004–2009	Athletic Bilbao	64	(2)
2009	→ Córdoba (loan)	3	(0)
2009–2010	Cartagena	0	(0)
2010	Guijuelo	11	(0)
2010–2011	Alavés	15	(1)
Total		177	(8)
- * Club domestic league appearances and goals

Javier Casas Cuevas (born 9 May 1982) is a Spanish former professional footballer who played as a left-back.

His 11-year career was closely associated with Athletic Bilbao, with which he appeared in five La Liga seasons for a total of 79 competitive games.

== Club career ==
=== Athletic Bilbao ===
Born in Bilbao, Biscay, Casas came through the ranks of Athletic Bilbao and made his professional debut during 2004–05. He became first-choice the next season after the departure of Asier del Horno to Chelsea, managing 24 league appearances and scoring twice during the campaign, at Getafe CF (1–1 draw) and Deportivo de La Coruña (2–1 win).

Ironically, Casas was left out of the first-team squad at the start of 2007–08 when Athletic re-signed del Horno on loan from Valencia CF. Unable to find a new club in the January 2008 transfer window, and still without a squad number, he was not eligible to play competitively during the entire season, but was reinstated the following campaign, appearing in the 1–3 home loss against UD Almería on 31 August 2008.

However, due to the permanence of veteran Koikili and the emergence of Real Sociedad youth graduate Mikel Balenziaga, Casas' opportunities were few and so, on 13 January 2009, he was loaned to Córdoba CF, which were then struggling in the Segunda División, until the end of the season, where he appeared very rarely.

=== Later years ===
Casas was released by Athletic in June 2009, joining FC Cartagena – recently promoted to the second tier – on a free transfer. Second-choice to Rafael Clavero and third after the signing in January 2010 of French Franck Signorino from Getafe, he was released, moving to lowly CD Guijuelo.

In the summer of 2010, Casas signed a one-year contract with fellow Segunda División B team Deportivo Alavés in his native region, hoping to "feel a footballer again".
