= FC Cartagena B =

Association football club in Spain

Cartagena B
- Full name: Fútbol Club Cartagena, S.A.D. "B"
- Nicknames: Efesé, Aladrokes, Albinegros, Boquerones, Cartagos
- Founded: 2015
- Ground: Estadio Cartagonova
- Capacity: 15,105
- President: Paco Belmonte
- Head coach: Pepe Aguilar
- League: Tercera Federación – Group 13
- 2025–26: Tercera Federación – Group 13, 12th of 18
Home colours	Away colours

Fútbol Club Cartagena B is the reserve team of FC Cartagena, a Spanish football team based in Cartagena, in the autonomous community of Murcia. Founded in 2015, it currently plays in Tercera Federación – Group 13, holding home games at Estadio Ciudad Jardín.

== History ==
In July 2015, Cartagena B was created as FC Cartagena's second reserve team, the first being CD Algar. It took the place of dissolved Soho-Medi CF in the Primera Autonómica, achieving immediate promotion as second.

In 2016, the club became Cartagena's first reserve team after the agreement with Algar was not renewed. Another promotion followed (now to Tercera División), after CF Lorca Deportiva assured their promotion to Segunda División B.

== Season to season ==
Season	Tier	Division	Place
2015–16	6	1ª Aut.	2nd
2016–17	5	Pref. Aut.	3rd
2017–18	4	3ª	8th
2018–19	4	3ª	17th
2019–20	4	3ª	11th
2020–21	4	3ª	3rd / 4th
2021–22	5	3ª RFEF	2nd
2022–23	4	2ª Fed.	9th
2023–24	4	2ª Fed.	18th
2024–25	5	3ª Fed.	14th
2025–26	5	3ª Fed.	12th
2026–27	5	3ª Fed.	

- 2 seasons in Segunda Federación
- 4 seasons in Tercera División
- 4 seasons in Tercera Federación/Tercera División RFEF

== Current squad ==
As of 10 September 2024.

Note: Flags indicate national team as defined under FIFA eligibility rules; some limited exceptions apply. Players may hold more than one non-FIFA nationality.

No.	Pos.	Nation	Player
1	GK	ESP	Nono Gómez
2	DF	DOM	José Conesa
3	DF	ESP	Álvaro Lorente
4	DF	ESP	Ángel Andugar
5	DF	ESP	Jesús Hernández
6	MF	ESP	Checo
7	FW	ESP	Javi Baldobar
8	MF	ESP	Juanfran Vera
9	FW	ESP	Ayman Amhot
10	MF	ESP	Joe Riley
11	MF	ESP	Alberto Puche
14	MF	ESP	Carmelo Sánchez

No.	Pos.	Nation	Player
15	DF	ESP	Fran Campos
16	MF	ESP	Javi Asensio
17	MF	ESP	Quique Romero
18	FW	ESP	Lakatus
19	FW	ESP	Caye Cancela
20	MF	ESP	Lázaro Rubio
21	FW	ESP	Adrián Picazo
22	DF	ESP	Dani Manzanares
24	MF	ESP	Nico Escarabajal
25	DF	ESP	Mario Aznar
26	GK	ECU	Jhafets Reyes

=== From Youth Academy ===
Note: Flags indicate national team as defined under FIFA eligibility rules; some limited exceptions apply. Players may hold more than one non-FIFA nationality.

No.	Pos.	Nation	Player
27	GK	ESP	Guillermo Hunt
28	GK	ESP	Rubén Mula

=== Current technical staff ===
Position	Staff
Manager	(Spain) Pepe Aguilar
Assistant manager	(Spain) Borja Gómez
Fitness coach	(Spain) Adrián González
Goalkeeper coach	(Spain) David Vera
Match delegate	(Spain) José Francisco López
Delegate	(Spain) Ginés Albaladejo
Kit man	(Spain) Raúl Martín
Physiotherapist	(Spain) Juan José Celdrán
Rehab fitness coach	(Spain) Francisco

Last updated: November 2021
Source: Cartagena B Cuerpo técnico (in Spanish)

== Managers ==
- Víctor Basadre (2015–2017)
- Juan Lillo (2017–2018)
- David Bascuñana (2018–2020)
- Pepe Aguilar (2020–)

== See also ==
- FC Cartagena-La Unión
- Cartagena FC
