= Rubén Martínez (footballer, born 1984) =

Spanish footballer

Rubén
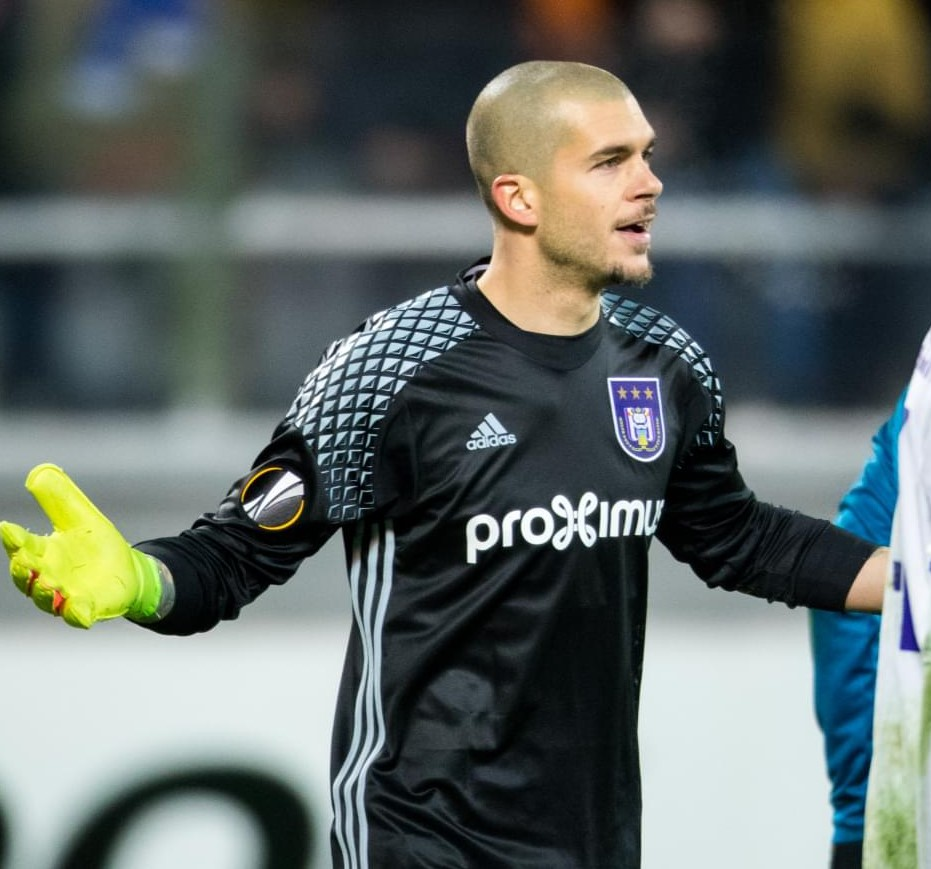
- Rubén in 2017

Personal information
- Full name: Rubén Iván Martínez Andrade
- Date of birth: 22 June 1984 (age 42)
- Place of birth: Coristanco, Spain
- Height: 1.87 m (6 ft 1 1/2 in)
- Position: Goalkeeper

Youth career
- 1994–1996: Bergantiños
- 1996–1997: Orillamar
- 1997–2002: Barcelona

Senior career*
Years	Team	Apps	(Gls)
2002–2004	Barcelona C	31	(0)
2002–2007	Barcelona B	97	(0)
2004–2008	Barcelona	2	(0)
2007–2008	→ Racing Ferrol (loan)	0	(0)
2008–2010	Cartagena	73	(0)
2010–2013	Málaga	11	(0)
2012–2013	→ Rayo Vallecano (loan)	30	(0)
2013–2014	Rayo Vallecano	34	(0)
2014–2015	Almería	23	(0)
2015–2016	Levante	15	(0)
2016–2018	Deportivo La Coruña	28	(0)
2017	→ Anderlecht (loan)	0	(0)
2018–2021	Osasuna	57	(0)
2021–2022	AEK Larnaca	2	(0)
Total		403	(0)

International career
2002	Spain U20	1	(0)
2004	Spain U21	1	(0)
2005	Spain U23	2	(0)
Medal record
Men's football
Representing Spain
FIFA U-20 World Cup
Runner-up	2003 United Arab Emirates
- * Club domestic league appearances and goals

Rubén Iván Martínez Andrade (born 22 June 1984), known simply as Rubén, is a Spanish former professional footballer who played as a goalkeeper.

== Club career ==
Born in Coristanco, Galicia, Rubén moved to FC Barcelona's youth academy in 1997, and reached the club's reserves five years later. As Turkey's Rüştü Reçber went on loan in the 2004–05 season he was handed the role of third choice in the first team, behind Víctor Valdés and Albert Jorquera.

On 18 December 2004, Rubén entered the pitch for Xavi after Valdés' dismissal in a 1–1 away draw against Valencia CF, and kept his place for the subsequent 2–1 La Liga win over Levante UD. After some more years in the B squad and an unassuming Segunda División loan at Racing de Ferrol (no games played, eventual relegation), he was released by Barcelona, joining FC Cartagena in the Segunda División B and going on to be an undisputed starter during his spell, promoting in the first season and nearly repeating the feat in the second.

Rubén was sold to Málaga CF on 25 August 2010, for €1.35 million. He made his competitive debut on 23 September, keeping a clean sheet in a 2–0 victory at Getafe CF. However, in late December, he fractured his right wrist in training – his second major physical ailment whilst at the club – being sidelined for the rest of the campaign and prompting the Andalusians to sign another goalkeeper in the winter transfer window, as Sergio Asenjo also suffered a severe injury (knee).

After a series of bad performances upon his recovery and also due to the managerial change at Málaga, Rubén lost his position to Willy Caballero, being further demoted to third choice after the club signed Carlos Kameni in January 2012. He was loaned to fellow league side Rayo Vallecano for the 2012–13 season.

Rubén returned to the Campo de Fútbol de Vallecas on 23 July 2013, signing a permanent one-year contract. On 28 May of the following year, he moved to UD Almería in the same league on a one-year deal.

On 2 June 2015, after suffering relegation with the Andalusians, Rubén agreed to a three-year contract with Levante UD. After again dropping down a tier, he joined Deportivo de La Coruña after cutting ties with the former.

Rubén was loaned to Belgian club R.S.C. Anderlecht in late January 2017, as Davy Roef moved in the opposite direction also on loan. He played his first match on 16 February, in a 2–0 home defeat of FC Zenit Saint Petersburg in the round of 32 of the UEFA Europa League which was also his first ever appearance in European competition.

On 5 July 2018, Rubén signed with CA Osasuna of the second division. He made 35 appearances for the champions in his first season and, in the summer of 2020, after contributing 19 to a tenth-place finish, put pen to paper to a one-year extension.

On 9 July 2021, Rubén joined Cypriot First Division club AEK Larnaca FC on a one-year deal.

== International career ==
Rubén won his only cap for the Spain under-21 team on 16 November 2004, replacing Asier Riesgo for the final 17 minutes of the 1–0 friendly win against England held in Alcalá de Henares.

== Career statistics ==
Appearances and goals by club, season and competition
Club	Season	League			National Cup		Continental		Other		Total	
Club	Season	Division	Apps	Goals	Apps	Goals	Apps	Goals	Apps	Goals	Apps	Goals
Barcelona B	2002–03	Segunda División B	1	0	—		—		—		1	0
Barcelona B	2003–04	Segunda División B	10	0	—		—		—		10	0
Barcelona B	2004–05	Segunda División B	21	0	—		—		—		21	0
Barcelona B	2005–06	Segunda División B	33	0	—		—		—		33	0
Barcelona B	2006–07	Segunda División B	32	0	—		—		—		32	0
Barcelona B	Total		97	0	—		—		—		97	0
Barcelona	2004–05	La Liga	2	0	1	0	0	0	—		3	0
Barcelona	2006–07	La Liga	0	0	0	0	0	0	0	0	0	0
Barcelona	Total		2	0	1	0	0	0	0	0	3	0
Racing Ferrol (loan)	2007–08	Segunda División	0	0	1	0	—		—		1	0
Cartagena	2008–09	Segunda División B	33	0	0	0	—		3 (Note: Appearances in Segunda División B play-offs)	0	36	0
Cartagena	2009–10	Segunda División	40	0	0	0	—		—		40	0
Cartagena	Total		73	0	1	0	—		3	0	77	0
Málaga	2010–11	La Liga	7	0	1	0	—		—		8	0
Málaga	2011–12	La Liga	4	0	0	0	—		—		4	0
Málaga	Total		11	0	1	0	—		—		12	0
Rayo Vallecano (loan)	2012–13	La Liga	30	0	1	0	—		—		31	0
Rayo Vallecano	2013–14	La Liga	34	0	1	0	—		—		35	0
Rayo Vallecano	Total		64	0	2	0	—		—		66	0
Almería	2014–15	La Liga	23	0	0	0	—		—		23	0
Levante	2015–16	La Liga	15	0	0	0	—		—		15	0
Deportivo La Coruña	2016–17	La Liga	0	0	4	0	—		—		4	0
Deportivo La Coruña	2017–18	La Liga	28	0	0	0	—		—		28	0
Deportivo La Coruña	Total		28	0	4	0	—		—		32	0
Anderlecht (loan)	2016–17	Belgian Pro League	0	0	0	0	6 (Note: Appearances in UEFA Europa League)	0	1 (Note: Appearance in Belgian Pro League play-offs)	0	7	0
Osasuna	2018–19	Segunda División	35	0	0	0	—		—		35	0
Osasuna	2019–20	La Liga	19	0	0	0	—		—		19	0
Osasuna	2020–21	La Liga	3	0	1	0	—		—		4	0
Osasuna	Total		57	0	1	0	—		—		58	0
AEK Larnaca	2021–22	Cypriot First Division	2	0	0	0	—		—		2	0
Career total			372	0	10	0	6	0	4	0	392	0

== Honours ==
Barcelona

- La Liga: 2004–05

Anderlecht

- Belgian First Division A: 2016–17

Osasuna

- Segunda División: 2018–19

Spain U23

- Mediterranean Games: 2005

Spain U20

- FIFA U-20 World Cup runner-up: 2003
