= Manuel Blanco =

Manuel Blanco may refer to:

- Francisco Manuel Blanco (1778–1845), Spanish botanist and friar
- Manuel Blanco Encalada (1790–1876), Chilean President
- Manuel Blanco Romasanta (1809–1863), Spanish serial killer
- Manuel Blanco (footballer) (born 1983), Spanish footballer
