= Manuel Palomeque =

Spanish footballer and manager

Personal information
- Full name: Manuel Sánchez Palomeque
- Date of birth: 1 January 1967 (age 59)
- Place of birth: Cartagena, Spain
- Position: Midfielder

Youth career
- 1980–1985: La Salle Minerva

Senior career*
Years	Team	Apps	(Gls)
1985	Algar		
1985–1988	CD Torre Pacheco		
1989–1990	Salamanca	5	(0)
1990–1995	Cartagena	113	(4)
1996–1997	Murcia	3	(0)
1997–1998	Ceuta		
1998	Cartagena		
Total		121	(4)

Managerial career
- 2001: Cartagena (interim)
- 2002: Cartagena (interim)
- 2003–2007: Pinatar
- 2007–2008: Las Palas
- 2008: La Unión
- 2009–2013: Los Alcázares (youth)
- 2013–2014: Algar
- 2014–2015: Cartagena
- 2015–2016: EF Torre Pacheco (youth)
- 2016–2017: Mar Menor
- 2017: Lorca Deportiva
- 2028–2019: Mar Menor
- 2019–2024: La Unión Atlético
- 2024–2025: Deportivo Marítimo
- * Club domestic league appearances and goals

Manuel Sánchez Palomeque (born 1 January 1967) is a Spanish retired footballer who played as a midfielder, and a manager.

== Club career ==
Born in Cartagena, Murcia, Palomeque only appeared with amateur clubs well into his 20s. In 1989, he joined UD Salamanca in Segunda División, making his debut as a professional on 17 December 1989, in a 1–0 away win against Real Madrid Castilla.

Palomeque appeared in just five league games for the Castile and León, and was released. He subsequently resumed his career in Segunda División B and Tercera División, representing Cartagena FC, Real Murcia, AD Ceuta and FC Cartagena.

Palomeque retired with the Efesé in 1998, aged 31, mainly due to injuries.

== Manager career ==
After being assistant manager at his last club, Palomeque was named interim for two occasions (2001 and 2002), with his side in the third level. He was later appointed manager of several clubs in the fourth and fifth levels from 2003 to 2009.

On 17 June 2013, after spending four years in charge of the youth setup of EF Los Alcázares, Palomeque was named CD Algar manager. The club eventually became Cartagena's reserve squad in 2014, and he was appointed manager of the latter on 19 December, replacing Simón Ruiz.
