= Carmelo Sánchez =

Spanish footballer

Personal information
- Full name: Carmelo Sánchez Alcaraz
- Date of birth: 22 February 2002 (age 24)
- Place of birth: Cartagena, Spain
- Position: Midfielder

Team information
- Current team: Moscardó

Youth career
- Cartagena FC
- Kelme
- 2018–2019: Murcia
- 2019–2021: UCAM Murcia

Senior career*
| Years | Team | Apps | (Gls) |
| 2020–2021 | UCAM Murcia B | 2 | (0) |
| 2021–2022 | Cartagena FC | 28 | (0) |
| 2022–2023 | Peña Balsamaiso | 29 | (2) |
| 2023–2024 | Arandina | 18 | (0) |
| 2024 | Cacereño | 4 | (0) |
| 2024–2025 | FC Cartagena B | 11 | (1) |
| 2024–2025 | FC Cartagena | 5 | (0) |
| 2025–2026 | Bala Azul | 10 | (0) |
| 2026– | Moscardó | 13 | (0) |
- * Club domestic league appearances and goals as of 10 June 2026

Carmelo Sánchez Alcaraz (born 22 February 2002), sometimes known as just Carmelo, is a Spanish professional footballer who plays as a midfielder for Segunda Federación club Moscardó.

== Career ==
Born in Cartagena, Region of Murcia, Carmelo represented Cartagena FC, Kelme CF, Real Murcia CF and UCAM Murcia CF as a youth. He made his senior debut with the latter's reserves on 26 January 2020, coming on as a second-half substitute in a 3–1 Tercera División away win over CD Plus Ultra.

On 12 July 2021, Carmelo returned to his first club Cartagena FC, now being assigned to the main squad in Tercera División RFEF. After being a regular starter, he moved to SD Logroñés on 30 August 2022, and was assigned to farm team Peña Balsamaiso CF also in the fifth division.

On 25 July 2023, Carmelo signed for Segunda Federación side Arandina CF. He moved to fellow league team CP Cacereño the following 24 January, but only featured rarely.

On 7 July 2024, Carmelo returned to his hometown after agreeing to a contract with FC Cartagena; he was initially assigned to the B-team in division five. He made his first team debut on 17 November, replacing goalscorer Gastón Valles late into a 1–0 Segunda División home win over SD Huesca.
