= Ander Lafuente =

Spanish footballer

Personal information
- Full name: Ander Lafuente Aguado
- Date of birth: 18 February 1983 (age 43)
- Place of birth: Santurtzi, Spain
- Height: 1.64 m (5 ft 5 in)
- Position: Midfielder

Youth career
- Arenas Getxo
- 1999–2001: Athletic Bilbao

Senior career*
Years	Team	Apps	(Gls)
2001–2003	Basconia	60	(7)
2003–2005	Bilbao Athletic	61	(8)
2005–2008	Cartagena	94	(9)
2008–2009	Granada	34	(6)
2009–2012	Cartagena	107	(8)
2012–2013	Ponferradina	24	(2)
2013–2014	Racing Santander	27	(2)
2014–2016	Sestao	32	(1)
2017	Agrupación Estudiantil		
2017–2018	Sodupe		
Total		439	(43)
- * Club domestic league appearances and goals

Ander Lafuente Aguado (born 18 February 1983) is a Spanish former professional footballer who played as a midfielder.

== Club career ==
Lafuente was born in Santurtzi, Biscay. A product of Athletic Bilbao's academy – he only played for affiliates CD Basconia and Bilbao Athletic, however – he signed with Segunda División B side FC Cartagena in 2005.

Having joined Granada CF of the same league for 2008–09 and experiencing a solid season, albeit with no promotion, Lafuente returned to Cartagena the following summer, with the club now in the Segunda División. He made his professional debut with the latter on 29 August 2009, playing 59 minutes in a 1–0 away win against Girona FC, and scored his first goal in the competition on 19 September to help to a 2–1 home defeat of CD Castellón. Additionally, in the return match against the former opposition, he netted twice in a 4–1 victory also at the Estadio Cartagonova.

In the summer of 2013, after one season in the second tier with SD Ponferradina, Lafuente returned to the lower leagues with Racing de Santander. After two years with Sestao River Club, the 33-year-old moved to amateur football.

After retiring, Lafuente went back to Athletic where he worked as youth coach.
