= Checo (footballer) =

Spanish footballer

Personal information
- Full name: Alejandro Martínez Flores
- Date of birth: 16 September 2004 (age 22)
- Place of birth: Santiago de la Ribera, Spain
- Height: 1.85 m (6 ft 1 in)
- Position: Midfielder

Team information
- Current team: Lorca Deportiva (on loan from Cartagena B)

Youth career
- 2019–2023: Cartagena

Senior career*
Years	Team	Apps	(Gls)
2022–	Cartagena B	81	(1)
2025–	Cartagena	1	(0)
2026–	→ Lorca Deportiva (loan)	5	(0)
- * Club domestic league appearances and goals as of 10 June 2026

Alejandro Martínez Flores (born 16 September 2004), commonly known as Checo, is a Spanish professional footballer who plays as a midfielder for Segunda Federación club Lorca Deportiva on loan from Cartagena B.

== Career ==
Born in Santiago de la Ribera, Murcia, Checo joined FC Cartagena's youth sides for the Cadete squad, and signed a new contract with the club on 31 March 2022. He made his senior debut with the reserves on 16 October 2022, starting in a 3–2 Segunda Federación away loss to CD Utrera.

On 16 June 2023, Checo renewed his link with the Efesé until 2025, being definitely promoted to the B-side. On 7 July of the following year, he agreed to a new two-year extension.

Checo scored his first senior goal on 1 December 2024, netting the B's third in a 3–2 Tercera Federación away win over CD Bullense. He made his first team debut the following 1 June, coming on as a second-half substitute for Daniel Luna in a 3–1 Segunda División home loss to CD Mirandés, as his side was already relegated.
