= Acciari =

Acciari is a surname. Notable people with the surname include:

- José Acciari (born 1978), Argentine footballer and manager
- Noel Acciari (born 1991), American ice hockey player
