= Santi Santos =

Spanish footballer

Personal information
- Full name: Santiago Santos Andrés
- Date of birth: 1 March 1984 (age 42)
- Place of birth: La Virgen del Camino, Spain
- Height: 1.83 m (6 ft 0 in)
- Position: Centre back

Youth career
- Oviedo

Senior career*
Years	Team	Apps	(Gls)
2002–2003	Oviedo B	14	(1)
2003–2004	Avilés	26	(3)
2004–2007	Celta B	82	(0)
2007–2008	Valladolid B	34	(1)
2008–2009	Cultural Leonesa	36	(5)
2009–2010	Cartagena	0	(0)
2010–2011	Cultural Leonesa	47	(6)
2011–2012	Real Unión	27	(3)
2012–2016	Cultural Leonesa	109	(4)
- * Club domestic league appearances and goals

Santiago 'Santi' Santos Andrés (born 1 March 1984) is a Spanish former footballer who played as a central defender.

== Club career ==
Born in La Virgen del Camino, Castile and León, Santos started playing youth football with Real Oviedo. In 2002, he made his senior debuts, playing with the B-side in Tercera División.

In 2003 summer Santos first arrived in Segunda División B after signing with neighbouring Real Avilés, and contributed with 26 appearances and three goals in his only season with the Asturians. In the following years he only represented reserve teams, Celta de Vigo B and Real Valladolid B, and in 2008 joined Cultural y Deportiva Leonesa also in the third level.

On 17 July 2009, Santos signed with Segunda División club FC Cartagena. He made his professional debut on 3 September, starting in a 3–2 home win over Elche CF for the campaign's Copa del Rey.

In February 2010 Santos rescinded his link with the Murcians, returning to Cultural shortly after. He went on to resume his career in the lower divisions, starting with Real Unión and returning to Leonesa for a third stint.
