= Tonino (footballer) =

Spanish footballer

Personal information
- Full name: Daniel Pérez Moreno
- Date of birth: 17 July 1981 (age 45)
- Place of birth: Guardamar del Segura, Spain
- Height: 1.80 m (5 ft 11 in)
- Position: Midfielder

Youth career
- Murcia

Senior career*
Years	Team	Apps	(Gls)
2000–2001	Murcia B		
2001–2002	Orihuela		
2002–2003	Elche B		
2003–2005	Molinense		
2005–2007	Alone		
2007–2008	Torrevieja	20	(10)
2008–2009	Alcoyano	50	(9)
2009–2010	Cartagena	5	(0)
2010–2012	Leganés	71	(13)
2012–2013	Cartagena	32	(7)
2013–2015	Orihuela	67	(9)
2015–2016	Crevillente	19	(2)
2016	Almoradí	6	(0)
Total		270	(50)
- * Club domestic league appearances and goals

Daniel Pérez Moreno (born 17 July 1981), commonly known as Tonino, is a Spanish former footballer who played as a midfielder.

== Club career ==
Tonino was born in Guardamar del Segura, Province of Alicante. During his career, in which he did not arrive in the Segunda División until the age of 28, he represented Real Murcia Imperial, Orihuela CF (two spells), Elche CF Ilicitano, CD Molinense, CD Alone – in his hometown – FC Torrevieja, CD Alcoyano, FC Cartagena (two stints), CD Leganés, Crevillente Deportivo and CD Almoradí.

Tonino made his debut as a professional on 29 August 2009 whilst at the service of Cartagena, coming on as a 75th-minute substitute in a 1–0 away win against Girona FC. It was one of only five appearances in the second tier.
