= Unai Expósito =

Spanish footballer

Personal information
- Full name: Unai Expósito Medina
- Date of birth: 23 January 1980 (age 46)
- Place of birth: Barakaldo, Spain
- Height: 1.76 m (5 ft 9 in)
- Position: Right-back

Youth career
- 1991–1995: Athletic Bilbao
- 1995–1998: Danok Bat

Senior career*
Years	Team	Apps	(Gls)
1998–1999	Basconia	37	(2)
1999–2003	Bilbao Athletic	105	(7)
2000–2003	Athletic Bilbao	2	(0)
2002–2003	→ Numancia (loan)	38	(2)
2003–2005	Osasuna	23	(0)
2005–2008	Athletic Bilbao	58	(0)
2008–2009	Hércules	28	(0)
2009–2011	Cartagena	41	(3)
2011–2013	Numancia	42	(0)
2013–2014	Barakaldo	25	(1)
2014–2016	Santurtzi	45	(1)
Total		444	(16)
- * Club domestic league appearances and goals

Unai Expósito Medina (born 23 January 1980) is a Spanish former professional footballer who played as a right-back.

He appeared in Segunda División 149 games over six seasons (five goals), representing in the competition Numancia (two spells), Hércules and Cartagena. In La Liga, he played for Athletic Bilbao and Osasuna.

== Club career ==
Born in Barakaldo, Biscay, Expósito graduated from Lezama, Athletic Bilbao's renowned youth academy, and made his debut for the first team during the 1999–2000 campaign while also appearing for the reserve side. From 2003 to 2005, after a season-long loan with CD Numancia in the Segunda División, he represented neighbours CA Osasuna also in La Liga.

In July 2005, Expósito returned to Athletic as a full member of the main squad but, having taken part in just four games in 2007–08, he signed for Hércules CF in the second tier. He joined another club in that league at the end of a sole season, FC Cartagena who had just promoted.

Expósito returned to Numancia on 27 June 2011, agreeing to a two-year contract.

== Personal life ==
Expósito was the nephew of Iosu Expósito, guitarist and singer of Spanish punk rock band Eskorbuto.
