= Jhafets Reyes =

Ecuadorian footballer (born 2006)

Jhafets
Personal information
- Full name: Jhafets Christ Dick Reyes
- Date of birth: 16 September 2006 (age 20)
- Place of birth: Murcia, Spain
- Height: 1.87 m (6 ft 2 in)
- Position: Goalkeeper

Team information
- Current team: Cartagena
- Number: 30

Youth career
- Los Alcázares
- Mediterráneo
- 2023–2024: Cartagena

Senior career*
Years	Team	Apps	(Gls)
2023–	Cartagena B	40	(0)
2024–	Cartagena	2	(0)

International career^{‡}
2024	Ecuador U18		
2024–	Ecuador U20	2	(0)
- * Club domestic league appearances and goals as of 10 June 2026 ‡ National team caps and goals as of 1 June 2025

Jhafets Christ Dick Reyes (born 16 September 2006), mononymously known as Jhafets, is a professional footballer who plays as a goalkeeper for Primera Federación club Cartagena. Born in Spain, he represents Ecuador at youth international level.

== Club career ==
Born in Murcia to a Nigerian father and an Ecuadorian mother, Jhafets played beach soccer for Los Alcázares FP and represented local football team CD Mediterráneo before joining FC Cartagena's youth sides in 2023. He made his senior debut with the reserves at the age of 17 on 15 October of that year, starting in a 1–0 Segunda Federación away loss to Marbella FC.

On 9 July 2024, Jhafets renewed his contract with the Efesé for two further years, being definitely promoted to the B-team. He made his first team debut on 12 October, playing the full 90 minutes in a 1–0 Segunda División home loss to Racing de Ferrol, as starter Pablo Cuñat was away on international duty and backup Toni Fuidias was injured.

== International career ==
On 10 April 2024, Jhafets was called up to the Ecuador national under-18 team. In September, he was called up to the under-20s, and played two friendlies against Barcelona SC.
