= David de Coz =

Spanish footballer

Personal information
- Full name: David Gutiérrez de Coz
- Date of birth: 6 February 1980 (age 46)
- Place of birth: Seville, Spain
- Height: 1.78 m (5 ft 10 in)
- Position: Right back

Youth career
- Betis

Senior career*
Years	Team	Apps	(Gls)
1999–2003	Betis B	80	(0)
2003–2005	Ceuta	55	(0)
2005–2007	Xerez	55	(2)
2007–2010	Murcia	80	(1)
2010–2011	Córdoba	30	(1)
2011–2013	Granada	0	(0)
2011–2012	→ Cádiz (loan)	30	(1)
2012–2013	→ Lugo (loan)	33	(1)
2013–2016	Lugo	60	(0)
Total		423	(6)
- * Club domestic league appearances and goals

David Gutiérrez de Coz (born 6 February 1980) is a Spanish former professional footballer who played as a right back.

He amassed Segunda División totals of 238 matches and five goals over ten seasons, with Xerez, Murcia, Córdoba and Lugo. In La Liga, he represented the second club.

== Club career ==
De Coz was born in Seville. After starting professionally with Real Betis' reserves he represented AD Ceuta, spending a total of six seasons in the Segunda División B with those clubs. He then moved to Betis' Andalusian neighbours of Xerez CD, scoring two goals in 30 Segunda División games in his first year.

As a special dispensation by the Royal Spanish Football Federation, de Coz was able to join La Liga's Real Murcia in late 2007 even though the summer transfer market had already closed, as veteran Curro Torres was lost for the season with a serious injury. He made his debut in the competition on 24 November by playing the entire match against Real Madrid (1–1 at home), and retained his status throughout the vast majority of the campaign, but the team were eventually relegated as second from bottom.

From 2008 to 2011, de Coz competed in the second tier, starting for both Murcia and Córdoba CF and being relegated in the second season. In August 2011 he signed with Granada CF for two years, being immediately loaned to neighbouring Cádiz CF.
