= Víctor (footballer, born 1974) =

Spanish footballer and manager

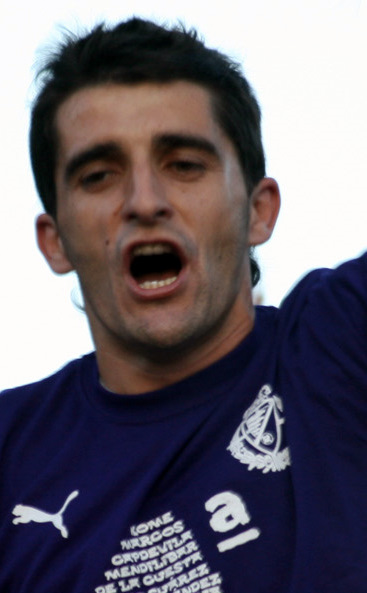
- Víctor in 2007

Personal information
- Full name: Víctor Manuel Fernández Gutiérrez
- Date of birth: 17 April 1974 (age 52)
- Place of birth: Mérida, Spain
- Height: 1.65 m (5 ft 5 in)
- Position: Striker

Youth career
- Leganés

Senior career*
| Years | Team | Apps | (Gls) |
| 1993 | Real Madrid C | 12 | (2) |
| 1993–1994 | Real Madrid B | 20 | (5) |
| 1994–1996 | Tenerife | 16 | (2) |
| 1996 | → Toledo (loan) | 20 | (10) |
| 1996–2000 | Valladolid | 133 | (38) |
| 2000–2004 | Villarreal | 131 | (39) |
| 2004–2009 | Valladolid | 169 | (52) |
| 2009–2011 | Cartagena | 72 | (21) |
| 2011–2012 | Leganés | 29 | (9) |
| Total | | 602 | (178) |

International career
| 2000 | Spain | 1 | (0) |

Managerial career
- 2012: Leganés
- 2015–2016: Cartagena
- * Club domestic league appearances and goals

Víctor Manuel Fernández Gutiérrez (born 17 April 1974), known simply as Víctor, is a Spanish former professional footballer. Usually a striker, he could also be put to use behind a sole attacker.

Over 18 seasons, he appeared in 561 matches across both major levels of Spanish football, scoring 167 goals (342 games and 93 goals in La Liga). He played nine years with Valladolid (two spells), and four with Villarreal.

== Playing career ==
=== Club ===
Víctor was born in Mérida, Extremadura. A product of CD Leganés' youth system, he made his senior debut with Real Madrid Castilla, and first appeared in La Liga with CD Tenerife, having little success in a one-and-a-half season stint. Towards the end of the second year, he played with CD Toledo in the Segunda División.

In 1996–97, Víctor joined Real Valladolid, scoring 16 top-flight goals in his debut campaign to help the club to rank seventh, then spent another four years with Villarreal CF, where he was also a regular fixture (totalling 28 goals in his first two seasons). On 5 June 2000, the latter signed him to a seven-year contract worth 1.4 million pesetas over the next seven years.

In summer 2004, Víctor was deemed surplus to requirements at Villarreal and rejoined Valladolid, teaming up with centre-forward Joseba Llorente for three years and netting nine goals to help the side to retain their top-tier status in 2008.

In July 2009, after having once again helped the Castile and León team to avoid relegation – 29 games, five goals, 1,956 minutes– Víctor, aged 35, was not offered a new contract and left. The following week, he penned a one-year deal with FC Cartagena, recently promoted to division two.

Víctor scored nine league goals for the Murcian side in his first season, improving to 12 in the following as they consecutively managed to stay afloat. In July 2011, the 37-year-old returned to first club Leganés who competed in the Segunda División B, signing for one year.

=== International ===
Víctor played one match for Spain, coming on for Luis Enrique in a 0–0 friendly draw with Croatia in Split, on 23 February 2000.

== Coaching career ==
In April 2012, Víctor retired to become Leganés' manager until the end of the campaign. With three wins and a draw, he saved them from relegation to Tercera División.

On 29 June 2015, Víctor returned to third-tier management at his former club Cartagena. His two-year contract ended with his dismissal on 1 February 2016, after seven games without a win.

== Personal life ==
Víctor's son, also named Víctor, is also a footballer. An attacking midfielder, he was brought up at Valladolid.

== Honours ==
Villarreal

- UEFA Intertoto Cup: 2003, 2004

Valladolid

- Segunda División: 2006–07
