= Toché (footballer) =

Spanish footballer

Personal information
- Full name: José Verdú Nicolás
- Date of birth: 1 January 1983 (age 43)
- Place of birth: Santomera, Spain
- Height: 1.84 m (6 ft 0 in)
- Position: Striker

Youth career
- Atlético Madrid

Senior career*
Years	Team	Apps	(Gls)
2002–2004	Atlético Madrid B	76	(34)
2003–2007	Atlético Madrid	1	(0)
2004–2005	→ Numancia (loan)	5	(0)
2005–2006	→ Hércules (loan)	25	(3)
2006–2007	→ Valladolid (loan)	15	(4)
2007–2008	Numancia	14	(3)
2009	Albacete	22	(5)
2009–2011	Cartagena	74	(35)
2011–2013	Panathinaikos	46	(20)
2014–2015	Deportivo La Coruña	37	(8)
2015–2019	Oviedo	136	(42)
2019–2020	Burgos	24	(5)
2020–2021	Orihuela	24	(7)
Total		499	(168)

International career
2000	Spain U16	5	(3)
2002–2003	Spain U20	4	(2)
- * Club domestic league appearances and goals

José Verdú Nicolás (born 1 January 1983), known as Toché, is a Spanish former footballer who played as a striker.

He appeared in 297 Segunda División matches in 11 seasons, scoring a total of 96 goals for Hércules, Valladolid, Numancia, Albacete, Cartagena, Deportivo and Oviedo. He added 32 games in La Liga, and also played professionally in Greece.

== Club career ==
Born in Santomera, Region of Murcia, Toché came up through the ranks of Atlético Madrid, making his first-team debut during the 2003–04 season in a 0–0 home draw against Deportivo de La Coruña. The following campaign he was loaned to CD Numancia, where he appeared in only five games as the club from Soria was eventually relegated from La Liga, although he was seriously injured in the process.

Toché spent the following seasons on loan at Hércules CF and Real Valladolid, both in the Segunda División. He returned to Numancia for 2007–08, and appeared sporadically in the side's promotion.

On 30 December 2008, having taken almost no part in the top-flight season, Toché left Numancia for second-tier side Albacete Balompié, signing a contract for the rest of the campaign and the next one. On 28 August of the following year, however, he moved teams again, joining promoted FC Cartagena. He had a breakthrough year in 2009–10, as they nearly achieved a second consecutive promotion, only missing two league matches – 3,317 minutes of action – and ranking in the Pichichi Trophy's top three.

On 19 July 2011, after scoring a further 16 league goals with Cartagena, Toché signed a three-year contract with Panathinaikos F.C. in Greece. He netted on his official debut for the team, making it 2–1 in an eventual 3–4 home loss against Odense Boldklub in the third qualifying round of the UEFA Champions League (5–4 aggregate defeat).

In November 2013, Toché cut ties with the Athens club after being unpaid for four months. On 20 January of the following year, he returned to his homeland and signed a short-term deal with Deportivo de La Coruña.

Toché scored four times for Depor during the season, as the Galicians returned to the top division at the first attempt. He netted his first goal in the competition on 20 September 2014, but in a 2–8 home loss to Real Madrid.

On 30 July 2015, Toché agreed to a one-year contract with Real Oviedo, newly promoted to the second tier. On 19 July 2019, having been a starter for the better part of his spell at the Estadio Carlos Tartiere, scoring 17 times in each of his first two seasons, the 36-year-old left by mutual consent.

== Honours ==
Valladolid

- Segunda División: 2006–07

Numancia

- Segunda División: 2007–08
