= Rafael Clavero =

Spanish footballer (born 1977)

Personal information
- Full name: Rafael Clavero Prados
- Date of birth: 10 January 1977 (age 49)
- Place of birth: Córdoba, Spain
- Height: 1.75 m (5 ft 9 in)
- Position: Left-back

Youth career
- Séneca

Senior career*
Years	Team	Apps	(Gls)
1995–1997	Montilla		
1997–1999	Córdoba	46	(0)
1999–2000	Mérida	11	(0)
2000	Real Madrid B	6	(0)
2000–2001	Numancia	5	(0)
2001–2004	Murcia	80	(0)
2004–2006	Osasuna	33	(0)
2006–2009	Tenerife	73	(0)
2009–2011	Cartagena	60	(0)
2011–2013	Huesca	30	(0)
2013–2014	Lucena	27	(0)
Total		371	(0)
- * Club domestic league appearances and goals

Rafael Clavero Prados (born 10 January 1977) is a Spanish former professional footballer who played as a left-back.

== Club career ==
Born in Córdoba, Andalusia, Clavero spent the vast majority of his career in the Segunda División. His La Liga output consisted of one season with CD Numancia, one with Real Murcia CF and two with CA Osasuna, for a total of 62 games in the competition.

In the 2005–06 campaign, Clavero started in 21 of his 22 league appearances for the latter club, who finished in a best-ever fourth position with the subsequent qualification for the UEFA Champions League.

== Honours ==
Murcia

- Segunda División: 2002–03
