= Álex Goikoetxea =

Spanish footballer

Personal information
- Full name: Alexander Goikoetxea Urkiaga
- Date of birth: 8 June 1983 (age 43)
- Place of birth: Artea, Spain
- Height: 1.78 m (5 ft 10 in)
- Position: Centre-back

Youth career
- Arratia
- 1997–2000: Athletic Bilbao

Senior career*
Years	Team	Apps	(Gls)
2000–2001	Basconia	36	(1)
2001–2005	Bilbao Athletic	98	(0)
2005–2009	Cultural Leonesa	84	(1)
2009–2011	Salamanca	59	(4)
2011–2012	Granada	0	(0)
2011–2012	→ Cádiz (loan)	25	(0)
2012–2013	Racing Santander	13	(1)
2014	Amorebieta	7	(0)
2014–2016	Leioa	47	(0)
Total		369	(7)

International career
1999–2000	Spain U16	7	(1)
2001	Spain U17	3	(0)
2001	Spain U19	2	(0)
2002–2003	Spain U20	5	(0)
- * Club domestic league appearances and goals

Alexander 'Álex' Goikoetxea Urkiaga (born 8 June 1983 in Artea, Biscay) is a Spanish former professional footballer who played as a central defender.

== Honours ==
Spain U17

- Meridian Cup: 2001

Spain U20

- FIFA U-20 World Cup runner-up: 2003
