= Biel Ribas =

Spanish footballer

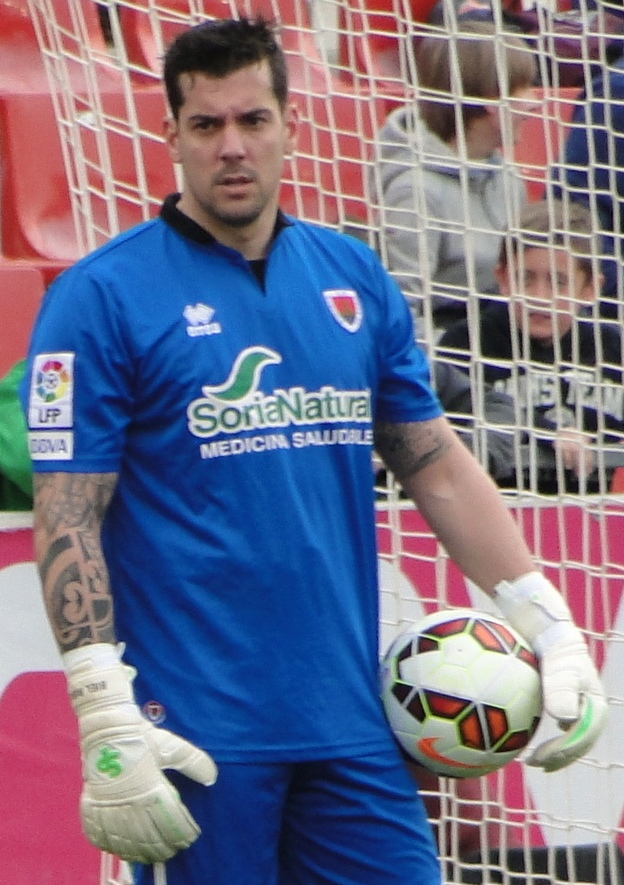
- Ribas with Numancia in 2015

Personal information
- Full name: Gabriel Ribas Ródenas
- Date of birth: 2 December 1985 (age 40)
- Place of birth: Palma, Spain
- Height: 1.86 m (6 ft 1 in)
- Position: Goalkeeper

Youth career
- Espanyol

Senior career*
Years	Team	Apps	(Gls)
2003–2007	Espanyol B	96	(0)
2005	Espanyol	1	(0)
2007	Lorca Deportiva	4	(0)
2008–2011	Salamanca	92	(0)
2011–2012	Atlético Baleares	16	(0)
2012–2016	Numancia	59	(0)
2016–2017	UCAM Murcia	48	(0)
2017–2018	Murcia	37	(0)
2018–2020	Fuenlabrada	65	(0)
2020–2022	UCAM Murcia	48	(0)
2022–2024	Talavera	59	(0)

International career
2003	Spain U17	4	(0)
2004	Spain U19	8	(0)
2005	Spain U20	4	(0)
- * Club domestic league appearances and goals as of 01:18, 31 July 2024 (UTC)

Gabriel 'Biel' Ribas Ródenas (born 2 December 1985) is a Spanish professional footballer who plays as a goalkeeper.

== Career statistics ==
As of match played 4 April 2021

Appearances and goals by club, season and competition
Club	Season	League			National Cup		Other		Total	
Club	Season	Division	Apps	Goals	Apps	Goals	Apps	Goals	Apps	Goals
Espanyol	2004–05	La Liga	1	0	0	0	—		1	0
Espanyol	2005–06	La Liga	0	0	0	0	—		0	0
Espanyol	2006–07	La Liga	0	0	0	0	—		0	0
Espanyol	Total		1	0	0	0	0	0	1	0
Lorca Deportiva	2007–08	Segunda División B	4	0	0	0	—		4	0
Salamanca	2007–08	Segunda División	6	0	0	0	—		6	0
Salamanca	2008–09	Segunda División	9	0	2	0	—		11	0
Salamanca	2009–10	Segunda División	40	0	0	0	—		40	0
Salamanca	2010–11	Segunda División	37	0	0	0	—		37	0
Salamanca	Total		92	0	2	0	0	0	94	0
Atlético Baleares	2011–12	Segunda División B	16	0	0	0	0	0	16	0
Numancia	2012–13	Segunda División	8	0	1	0	—		9	0
Numancia	2013–14	Segunda División	31	0	0	0	—		31	0
Numancia	2014–15	Segunda División	17	0	0	0	—		17	0
Numancia	2015–16	Segunda División	3	0	1	0	—		4	0
Numancia	Total		59	0	2	0	0	0	61	0
UCAM Murcia	2015–16	Segunda División B	17	0	0	0	4	0	21	0
UCAM Murcia	2016–17	Segunda División	31	0	2	0	—		33	0
UCAM Murcia	Total		48	0	2	0	4	0	54	0
Murcia	2017–18	Segunda División B	37	0	0	0	2	0	39	0
Fuenlabrada	2018–19	Segunda División B	36	0	0	0	2	0	38	0
Fuenlabrada	2019–20	Segunda División	29	0	0	0	—		29	0
Fuenlabrada	Total		65	0	0	0	2	0	67	0
UCAM Murcia	2020–21	Segunda División B	19	0	0	0	—		19	0
Career total			408	0	6	0	8	0	422	0

== Honours ==
UCAM Murcia

- Segunda División B: 2015–16

Fuenlabrada

- Segunda División B: 2018–19

Spain U19

- UEFA European Under-19 Championship: 2004
