= Vicente Pascual =

Spanish footballer

Personal information
- Full name: Vicente Pascual Collado
- Date of birth: 31 August 1986 (age 40)
- Place of birth: Argente, Spain
- Height: 1.75 m (5 ft 9 in)
- Position: Midfielder

Youth career
- Zaragoza

Senior career*
Years	Team	Apps	(Gls)
2003–2009	Zaragoza B		
2004–2005	→ Huesca (loan)	32	(3)
2008–2009	Zaragoza	5	(1)
2009–2010	Huesca	15	(0)
2010–2011	Castellón	17	(0)
2011–2012	Andorra	28	(2)
2012–2013	Sariñena		
2013–2014	Teruel		
- * Club domestic league appearances and goals

Vicente Pascual Collado (born 31 August 1986) is a Spanish former footballer who played as a midfielder.
