= Daniel López Ramos =

Spanish footballer (born 1976)

Personal information
- Full name: Daniel López Ramos
- Date of birth: 24 November 1976 (age 49)
- Place of birth: Jerez de la Frontera, Spain
- Height: 1.82 m (5 ft 11 1/2 in)
- Position: Centre back

Senior career*
Years	Team	Apps	(Gls)
1995–2001	Xerez	99	(3)
2001–2005	Córdoba	124	(1)
2005–2007	Poli Ejido	74	(1)
2007–2009	Las Palmas	75	(0)
2009–2010	Albacete	27	(0)
2010–2011	Oviedo	30	(2)
Total		429	(7)
- * Club domestic league appearances and goals

Daniel López Ramos (born 24 November 1976) is a Spanish former footballer who played as a central defender.

== Club career ==
Born in Jerez de la Frontera, Province of Cádiz, López Ramos played 308 Segunda División matches over ten seasons in representation of five clubs, mainly Córdoba CF.

He retired in June 2011 at nearly 35, after one year in Segunda División B with Real Oviedo.
