= Rubén Palomeque =

Spanish steeplechase runner

Personal information
- Full name: Rubén Palomeque Barrera
- Nationality: Spain
- Born: 14 August 1980 (age 45) Barcelona, Spain
- Height: 1.75 m (5 ft 9 in)
- Weight: 57 kg (126 lb)

Sport
- Sport: Athletics
- Event: Steeplechase
- Club: FC Barcelona
- Coached by: Enrique Pascual Oliva

Achievements and titles
- Personal best: 3000 m steeplechase: 8:20.07 (2008)

Rubén Palomeque Barrera (born August 14, 1980 in Barcelona) is a Spanish steeplechase runner. In 2008, he set his personal best time of 8:20.07 by finishing third at the European Athletics Premium Meeting in Heusden-Zolder, Belgium.

Palomeque represented Spain at the 2008 Summer Olympics in Beijing, where he competed for the men's 3000 m steeplechase, along with his compatriots Eliseo Martín and José Luis Blanco. He ran in the first heat against twelve other athletes, including France's Bouabdellah Tahri and Kenya's Brimin Kipruto, who eventually won the gold medal in the final. He finished the race in twelfth place by nineteen seconds behind Portugal's Alberto Paulo, outside his personal best time of 8:58.50. Palomeque, however, failed to advance into the final, as he placed thirty-sixth overall and was ranked farther below four mandatory slots for the next round.

Palomeque is a member of Club Atletico FC Barcelona, being coached and trained by Enrique Pascual Oliva.
