= Quique de Lucas =

Spanish retired footballer (born 1978)

Enrique de Lucas
Personal information
- Full name: Enrique de Lucas Martínez
- Date of birth: 17 August 1978 (age 48)
- Place of birth: L'Hospitalet, Spain
- Height: 1.77 m (5 ft 10 in)
- Position: Midfielder

Youth career
- Ferrán Martorell
- Barcelona
- 1995–1996: Espanyol

Senior career*
Years	Team	Apps	(Gls)
1996–1999	Espanyol B	67	(25)
1998–2002	Espanyol	92	(16)
2001	→ Paris Saint-Germain (loan)	4	(0)
2002–2003	Chelsea	25	(0)
2003–2007	Alavés	127	(19)
2007–2009	Murcia	57	(7)
2009–2010	Cartagena	38	(11)
2010–2013	Celta	98	(21)
2013–2014	Hércules	24	(4)
2015	Biggleswade United	3	(0)
Total		535	(103)

International career
1995	Spain U16	7	(1)
1998–1999	Spain U21	4	(0)
- * Club domestic league appearances and goals

Enrique "Quique" de Lucas Martínez (born 17 August 1978) is a Spanish retired footballer who played mainly as an attacking midfielder.

He started his professional career with Espanyol, going on to amass La Liga totals of 168 games and 25 goals over eight seasons, also representing in the competition Alavés, Murcia and Celta. He added 268 matches and 53 goals in Segunda División, where he played for all the clubs except his first.

De Lucas had two spells abroad, including the 2002–03 campaign with Chelsea.

== Club career ==
Born in L'Hospitalet de Llobregat, Barcelona, Catalonia, de Lucas came through the academy of RCD Espanyol, making his first-team debut on 15 May 1998 away against Real Valladolid (his sole appearance of the season) and being promoted to the main squad immediately afterwards. Subsequently, he became an important attacking element for the Pericos, appearing in 30 La Liga matches and scoring four goals in 1999–2000 while helping the club to that year's Copa del Rey.

After his contract expired in 2002, and after an unassuming loan spell at Paris Saint-Germain F.C. the previous year, de Lucas joined Chelsea on a four-year deal, being relatively used in his first and only season. His sole goal for the English team was a well-executed chip in the UEFA Cup against Viking FK, in a 2–1 home win but 4–5 loss on aggregate.

De Lucas then returned to Spain, having a huge impact at Deportivo Alavés, although most of his stint was spent in the second division. He netted six times from 40 appearances as the Basque side returned to the top level after two years, being immediately relegated the following campaign.

After another season in division two, de Lucas became Real Murcia's first signing after it achieved a top-flight return in 2007, agreeing on a two-year contract. He featured heavily in his first year, notably scoring in a 1–1 home draw against Real Madrid, but the club returned to the second tier.

In August 2009, de Lucas had a trial with Football League Championship's Blackpool after his Murcia link had expired, alongside Will Haining and Ishmel Demontagnac. A deal did not materialise, and he signed with FC Cartagena – recently returned to the second division – shortly after; he scored the first goal of the new campaign, a 1–0 victory at Girona FC.

In late June 2010, after nearly helping Cartagena to another promotion (fifth place, with chances of promotion until the last two rounds) while scoring a career-best 11 goals, de Lucas moved to RC Celta de Vigo. He produced the same individual numbers in his first two years – 37 games, nine goals – helping the Galicians promote to the top level in 2012 as runners-up.

After suffering relegation from the second tier, with Hércules CF, de Lucas retired from football at the age of 35. In February 2015, however, he returned to active, joining English amateurs Biggleswade United.

== International career ==
De Lucas made four appearances for the Spain under-21 side, in a one-year span.

== Honours ==
Espanyol

- Copa del Rey: 1999–2000
