= Juan González-Vigil =

Peruvian footballer (born 1985)

Personal information
- Full name: Juan Diego González-Vigil Bentin
- Date of birth: 18 February 1985 (age 41)
- Place of birth: Lima, Peru
- Height: 1.78 m (5 ft 10 in)
- Position: Striker

Youth career
- 1999: Regatas Lima
- 2000–2001: Alianza Lima

Senior career*
Years	Team	Apps	(Gls)
2002	Deportivo Wanka	3	(0)
2002–2003	Locomotive Tbilisi	5	(1)
2003–2005	Alianza Lima	52	(15)
2005–2007	Málaga B	27	(5)
2006	→ Zulte Waregem (loan)	3	(0)
2007	→ Cienciano (loan)	18	(8)
2007	Universitario	16	(1)
2008	Bolognesi	21	(13)
2008–2010	Alianza Lima	45	(3)
2010	Cartagena	8	(0)
2010–2011	Deportivo Quito	16	(3)
2011	León de Huánuco	11	(2)
2011	Sporting Cristal	6	(0)
2012	Universidad San Martín	15	(1)
2013–2014	Alianza Lima	28	(3)
2015–2016	Deportivo Municipal	75	(6)
2018–2019	Sport Boys	8	(0)
2020	Santos de Nasca	8	(0)

International career
2007–2010	Peru	4	(0)
- * Club domestic league appearances and goals

Juan Diego González-Vigil Bentin (born 18 February 1985) is a Peruvian former professional footballer who played as a striker.

== Club career ==
González-Vigil played for Coronel Bolognesi, Málaga, Zulte Waregem and Cienciano.

He participated in the UEFA Cup and the Copa Libertadores.

On 24 October 2010, González-Vigil scored a notable goal for Deportivo Quito from a distance of 45 meters away.

After his spell in Ecuador, he decided to go back to Peru. On 2 February 2011, he joined the 2010 runners-up León de Huánuco.

On 3 June 2011, it was announced that González-Vigil joined Sporting Cristal in the middle of the 2011 Torneo Descentralizado season. He signed a contract that lasted until the end of the 2011 season.

== International career ==
González-Vigil played for the Peru U20 and Peru U23 sides.

On 11 November 2010, he was called up by the new Peru national team coach Sergio Markarián to play in a friendly match against Colombia. The friendly was played on 17 November 2010 in Bogotá and finished in a 1–1 draw. He came on in the 66th minute replacing José Carlos Fernández.

== Honours ==
Alianza Lima

- Torneo Descentralizado: 2003, 2004
