= Deportivo Marítimo =

Association football club in Spain

- Full name: Deportivo Marítimo
- Founded: 28 June 2024; 2 years ago
- Ground: Mundial 82, Cartagena, Region of Murcia, Spain
- Capacity: 1,000
- President: Miguel Rodríguez
- Manager: Juan Molina
- League: Tercera Federación – Group 13
- 2025–26: Tercera Federación – Group 13, 13th of 18
- Website: https://deportivomaritimo.es/
Home colours	Away colours

Deportivo Marítimo is a football team based in Cartagena, in the Region of Murcia. Founded in 2024, the team plays in Tercera Federación – Group 13, holding home games at Estadio Mundial 82.

== History ==
On 28 June 2024, it was announced that Deportivo Marítimo was founded. The club immediately entered in the Tercera Federación, after acquiring the place of Balsicas Atlético. The new club also had former footballer Isaac Jové as a general director, and had Manuel Palomeque as their first-ever manager.

== Season to season ==
Season	Tier	Division	Place	Copa del Rey
2024–25	5	3ª Fed.	12th	
2025–26	5	3ª Fed.	13th	
2026–27	5	3ª Fed.		

- 3 seasons in Tercera Federación
