= Siro Darino =

Argentine professional football player

Personal information
- Full name: Siro Maximiliano Darino
- Date of birth: 1 September 1976 (age 50)
- Place of birth: San Carlos de Bolívar, Argentina
- Height: 1.71 m (5 ft 7 in)
- Position: Midfielder

Senior career*
Years	Team	Apps	(Gls)
1998–2000	Gimnasia y Esgrima La Plata	21	(0)
2000–2001	Getafe	36	(1)
2001–2002	Hércules	19	(2)
2002–2005	Universidad Las Palmas	75	(12)
2005–2010	Las Palmas	133	(13)
- * Club domestic league appearances and goals as of 26 October 2009

Siro Maximiliano Darino (born September 1, 1976) is an Argentine professional football player. He also holds Italian citizenship.

== Career ==
Born in San Carlos de Bolívar, Darino began playing football with Gimnasia y Esgrima de La Plata. He made his Argentine Primera División debut as a substitute against Unión de Santa Fe on 9 August 1998. After suffering a series of injuries, he was released by Gimnasia in June 2000.

Darino moved to Spain to join Segunda División side Getafe CF later in 2000. He made 36 league appearances as the club were relegated to the third-tier of Spanish football. The following season he played on loan in the Segunda División B with Hércules CF, appearing in 27 matches as the club failed to gain promotion.

In the summer of 2002, Darino contemplated a move to a club in Italy's Serie C but signed a one-year contract with Universidad de Las Palmas CF with an option to renew. He made several appearances for Universidad de Las Palmas in the Segunda B.
