= Mariano Sánchez (footballer) =

Spanish footballer (born 1978)

Personal information
- Full name: Mariano Sánchez Martínez
- Date of birth: 28 January 1978 (age 48)
- Place of birth: San Pedro del Pinatar, Spain
- Height: 1.88 m (6 ft 2 in)
- Position: Defensive midfielder

Youth career
- Pinatar

Senior career*
Years	Team	Apps	(Gls)
1997–1998	Pinatar		
2003–2004	Mar Menor	32	(6)
2004–2005	Alcoyano	30	(3)
2005–2014	Cartagena	297	(18)
Total		359	(27)
- * Club domestic league appearances and goals

Mariano Sánchez Martínez (born 28 January 1978) is a Spanish former professional footballer who played as a defensive midfielder.

He appeared in 108 Segunda División games over three seasons, scoring two goals for Cartagena.

== Club career ==
Born in San Pedro del Pinatar, Region of Murcia, Sánchez did not reach the Segunda División B until he was 26, arriving at CD Alcoyano in 2004 from amateurs AD Mar Menor-San Javier. In the following year he moved to another club at that level, FC Cartagena, earning promotion to Segunda División in his fourth season.

Sánchez made his debut in the competition on 29 August 2009 at the age of 31 years and seven months, playing the full 90 minutes in a 1–0 away win against Girona FC. He scored his first league goal on 22 May 2010 in the 3–5 home loss to Levante UD, and never appeared in less than 34 league matches in his three seasons in that tier, suffering relegation in his last and renewing his contract for a further two years in June 2012.

On 14 May 2014, the 36-year-old Sánchez announced he would retire at the end of the campaign while hoping to help his team promote, which eventually did not befell.

== Personal life ==
Sánchez rejected an offer to play youth football for Real Murcia when he was 18, after deciding to move to Madrid to study architecture. Not being able to enter Real Madrid's youth system, he chose to retire from football.

After his playing days, Sánchez continued to work as an architect. Still as an active player, he was the figurehead behind the creation of the sports complex Pinatar Arena, in his hometown.
