= David González (footballer, born 1981) =

Spanish footballer

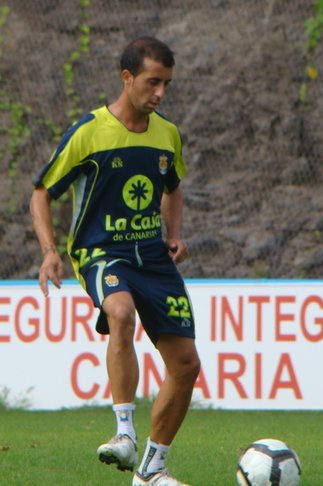
- González with Las Palmas in 2009

Personal information
- Full name: Francisco David González Borges
- Date of birth: 25 August 1981 (age 45)
- Place of birth: Las Palmas, Spain
- Height: 1.71 m (5 ft 7 in)
- Position: Midfielder

Youth career
- Huracán
- Las Palmas

Senior career*
Years	Team	Apps	(Gls)
2001–2002	Universidad LP		
2002–2004	Las Palmas B		
2003–2014	Las Palmas	200	(9)
2004	→ Universidad LP (loan)	10	(2)
2014	Numancia	15	(0)
2014–2015	Alcorcón	9	(0)
2015	Hércules	12	(0)
2016–2024	Tamaraceite	162	(28)
Total		408	(39)
- * Club domestic league appearances and goals

Francisco David González Borges (born 25 August 1981) is a Spanish former professional footballer who played as a midfielder.

== Club career ==
González was born in Las Palmas, Canary Islands. He spent the vast majority of his career with UD Las Palmas, appearing in 200 matches in the Segunda División and also representing in the competition CD Numancia and AD Alcorcón.

Following a brief spell in the Segunda División B with Hércules CF, in September 2016 González signed with amateurs UD Tamaraceite in his native region. He helped them promote from the regional leagues to the third tier in only four years.
