= José Acciari =

Argentine footballer

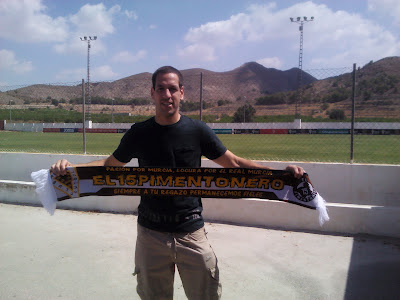
- Acciari in 2013

Personal information
- Full name: José Luis Acciari
- Date of birth: 29 November 1978 (age 47)
- Place of birth: San Miguel, Argentina
- Height: 1.82 m (6 ft 0 in)
- Position: Midfielder

Senior career*
Years	Team	Apps	(Gls)
1995–1999	San Miguel	87	(10)
1999–2000	Banfield	33	(2)
2000–2001	Estudiantes	6	(0)
2001	Club Almagro	22	(5)
2002–2008	Murcia	165	(14)
2007–2008	→ Córdoba (loan)	28	(1)
2008–2012	Elche	114	(3)
2012	Girona	9	(0)
2012–2015	Murcia	89	(11)
Total		553	(46)

Managerial career
- 2015–2016: Murcia B
- 2016: Murcia
- 2016–2017: Murcia B
- 2017: Elche B
- 2017: Elche (caretaker)
- 2017–2019: Elche (assistant)
- 2019–2020: Guadalajara
- 2021–2022: Racing Murcia
- 2023: Lorca Deportiva
- 2023–2024: Beroe
- 2025: Unionistas
- * Club domestic league appearances and goals

José Luis Acciari (born 29 November 1978) is an Argentine former professional footballer who played mainly as a defensive midfielder. He is currently a manager.

He spent the bulk of his 20-year career in Spain, mainly with Murcia. Over 12 seasons, he amassed Segunda División totals of 337 matches and 19 goals, also representing in the competition Córdoba, Elche and Girona.

== Playing career ==
=== Argentina ===
Acciari was born in San Miguel, Buenos Aires. During his career in his country he played mainly in the Primera Nacional, making only six appearances in the Primera División with Estudiantes de La Plata.

Acciari represented Club Atlético San Miguel, Club Atlético Banfield and Club Almagro. With the second side, he appeared in the second round of the promotion playoffs, in a final defeat against Club Atlético Los Andes.

=== Spain ===
In January 2002, Acciari moved abroad to Spain, signing with Real Murcia CF in the country's Segunda División. After a period of adjustment, he became an undisputed starter for the club which promoted at the end of his first full season, with the player contributing 38 games and four goals.

After a marred transfer to Deportivo de La Coruña, Acciari played 3,354 minutes in 2004–05, but was severely injured in the left knee late into the following campaign, effectively ending his Murcia career – he could only appear five times in 2006–07, with his team again promoting to La Liga.

Acciari was then loaned to another side in the second division, Córdoba CF. In June 2008, Murcia released him and he signed with Elche CF of the same tier for two years.

On 11 July 2012, Acciari returned to the Estadio Nueva Condomina after arriving from Girona FC. Over his two spells, he made 267 competitive appearances.

== Coaching career ==
After retiring at the age of 36, Acciari went on to work as manager to Murcia and Elche's reserves. He also acted briefly as interim to the first team of both clubs.

On 18 June 2019, Acciari was appointed at Tercera División's CD Guadalajara. He resigned on 26 August 2020.

Acciari signed with Racing Murcia FC of the same league on 17 May 2021. The following month, he agreed to a contract extension.

== Managerial statistics ==
As of 24 May 2025

Managerial record by team and tenure
Team	Nat	From	To	Record								Ref
Team	Nat	From	To	G	W	D	L	GF	GA	GD	Win %	Ref
Murcia B	(Spain)	1 July 2015	9 May 2016	33	14	4	15	42	39	+3	42.42	
Murcia	(Spain)	9 May 2016	30 June 2016	3	1	1	1	3	3	+0	33.33	
Murcia B	(Spain)	17 July 2016	20 June 2017	38	15	14	9	67	44	+23	39.47	
Elche B	(Spain)	20 June 2017	21 November 2017	14	1	7	6	12	16	−4	7.14	
Elche (interim)	(Spain)	13 November 2017	20 November 2017	1	0	0	1	0	2	−2	0.00	
Guadalajara	(Spain)	18 June 2019	26 August 2020	29	15	7	7	34	19	+15	51.72	
Racing Murcia	(Spain)	17 May 2021	25 June 2022	38	16	14	8	50	29	+21	42.11	
Lorca Deportiva	(Spain)	21 January 2023	10 June 2023	17	10	3	4	30	14	+16	58.82	
Beroe	(Bulgaria)	20 September 2023	30 September 2024	38	13	6	19	29	44	−15	34.21	
Unionistas	(Spain)	7 April 2025	29 May 2025	7	1	3	3	2	7	−5	14.29	
Total				218	86	59	73	269	217	+52	39.45	—

== Honours ==
Murcia

- Segunda División: 2002–03
