= Manuel Blanco (footballer) =

Spanish footballer (born 1983)

Personal information
- Full name: Manuel Blanco Rodríguez
- Date of birth: 1 March 1983 (age 43)
- Place of birth: Seville, Spain
- Height: 1.82 m (5 ft 11 1/2 in)
- Position: Right back

Youth career
- 2001–2002: San Juan

Senior career*
Years	Team	Apps	(Gls)
2002–2006	Sevilla B	88	(3)
2002–2003	→ Los Palacios (loan)		
2006–2008	Tenerife	27	(0)
2008–2009	Alicante	28	(0)
2009–2010	Albacete	13	(0)
2011	Ontinyent	14	(0)
2011–2012	Ceuta	25	(0)
2012–2013	Écija	30	(0)
2013–2014	Xerez	13	(0)
2014	Sanluqueño	12	(0)
Total		250	(3)
- * Club domestic league appearances and goals

Manuel Blanco Rodríguez (born 1 March 1983 in Seville, Andalusia) is a Spanish retired footballer who played as a right back.
