= 2009–10 Segunda División =

79th season of the second-tier football league in Spain

Segunda División
- Season: 2009–10
- Champions: Real Sociedad
- Promoted: Real Sociedad; Hércules CF; Levante UD
- Relegated: Cádiz CF; Real Murcia; Real Unión; CD Castellón
- Matches: 462
- Goals: 1,114 (2.41 per match)
- Top goalscorer: (Spain) Jorge Molina

The 2009–10 Segunda División season (known as the Liga Adelante for sponsorship reasons) was the 79th since its establishment. The first matches of the season were played on 29 August 2009, and the season ended on 19 June 2010. Real Betis, Numancia and Recreativo de Huelva are the teams which were relegated from La Liga the previous season. The teams which were promoted from Segunda División B were: Cádiz (champion), Cartagena (runner-up), Real Unión (play-off winner) and Villarreal B (play-off winner).

The first goal of the season was scored by Quique de Lucas, who scored a seventh-minute goal for Cartagena against Girona in the early kick-off. The first red card of the season was given to David González from Las Palmas in their opening game against Real Sociedad. The first hat-trick was scored by Cristhian Stuani in the match between Castellón and Albacete.

== Teams ==
Location of teams in Segunda División 2009–10
Canary Islands

The 2009–10 Segunda División was made up of the following teams:

Team	Home city	Stadium	Capacity
Albacete	Albacete	Carlos Belmonte	17,500
Betis	Seville	Benito Villamarín	55,500
Cádiz	Cádiz	Ramón de Carranza	25,033
Cartagena	Cartagena	Cartagonova	14,500
Castellón	Castellón	Nou Estadi Castàlia	14,485
Celta Vigo	Vigo	Balaídos	31,800
Córdoba	Córdoba	Nuevo Arcángel	18,280
Elche	Elche	Martínez Valero	36,017
Gimnàstic	Tarragona	Nou Estadi	14,500
Girona	Girona	Montilivi	9,500
Hércules	Alicante	José Rico Pérez	29,500
Huesca	Huesca	El Alcoraz	5,300
Las Palmas	Las Palmas de Gran Canaria	Gran Canaria	31,250
Levante	Valencia	Ciutat de València	26,354
Numancia	Soria	Los Pajaritos	9,025
Rayo Vallecano	Madrid	Teresa Rivero	15,500
Real Murcia	Murcia	Nueva Condomina	31,179
Real Sociedad	San Sebastián	Anoeta	39,500
Real Unión	Irun	Gal	6,344
Recreativo	Huelva	Nuevo Colombino	21,670
Salamanca	Villares de la Reina	El Helmántico	17,341
Villarreal B	Vila-real	Ciudad Deportiva	5,000

== League table ==
Pos	Team	Pld	W	D	L	GF	GA	GD	Pts	Promotion or relegation
1	Real Sociedad (C, P)	42	20	14	8	53	37	+16	74	Promotion to La Liga
2	Hércules (P)	42	19	14	9	61	34	+27	71 (Note: HÉR: 7 pts; LEV: 6 pts; BET: 4 pts)	Promotion to La Liga
3	Levante (P)	42	19	14	9	63	45	+18	71	Promotion to La Liga
4	Betis	42	19	14	9	61	38	+23	71	
5	Cartagena	42	18	11	13	58	49	+9	65	
6	Elche	42	18	9	15	67	57	+10	63	
7	Villarreal B	42	16	13	13	60	56	+4	61	
8	Numancia	42	16	11	15	55	53	+2	59	
9	Recreativo	42	14	15	13	40	42	−2	57	
10	Córdoba	42	14	13	15	40	46	−6	55	
11	Rayo Vallecano	42	13	14	15	67	58	+9	53	
12	Celta de Vigo	42	13	13	16	38	44	−6	52 (Note: CEL: 13 pts; HUE: 12 pts; GIR: 11 pts; ALB: 9 pts; SAL: 8 pts)	
13	Huesca	42	12	16	14	36	40	−4	52	
14	Girona	42	13	13	16	45	59	−14	52	
15	Albacete	42	12	16	14	60	62	−2	52	
16	Salamanca	42	13	13	16	44	54	−10	52	
17	Las Palmas	42	12	15	15	49	49	0	51 (Note: GIM 2–1 LPA; LPA 1–0 GIM)	
18	Gimnàstic	42	14	9	19	42	55	−13	51	
19	Cádiz (R)	42	12	14	16	49	64	−15	50 (Note: MUR 2–2 CAD; CAD 1–0 MUR)	Relegation to Segunda División B
20	Murcia (R)	42	11	17	14	49	51	−2	50	Relegation to Segunda División B
21	Real Unión (R)	42	12	10	20	40	59	−19	46	Relegation to Segunda División B
22	Castellón (R)	42	7	12	23	37	62	−25	33	Relegation to Segunda División B

Source: LFP – Liga Adelante
Rules for classification: 1st points; 2nd head-to-head points; 3rd head-to-head goal difference; 4th head-to-head goals scored; 5th goal difference; 6th number of goals scored; 7th Fair-play points
(C) Champions; (P) Promoted; (R) Relegated

== Results ==
Home \ Away	ALB	BET	CÁD	CAR	CAS	CDV	CÓR	ELC	GIM	GIR	HÉR	HUE	LPA	LEV	MUR	NUM	RVA	RSO	RUN	REC	SAL	VIB
Albacete	—	1–3	0–1	0–0	1–1	0–2	3–0	2–2	1–1	3–0	1–2	0–0	3–2	1–0	3–2	2–3	2–2	0–0	1–0	1–3	2–1	1–1
Betis	0–0	—	4–0	0–0	2–0	1–1	3–0	0–3	3–0	0–1	1–1	1–1	1–0	4–0	1–1	2–0	3–1	1–0	1–1	3–0	1–0	4–0
Cádiz	4–3	2–2	—	1–3	1–0	3–1	0–0	2–1	0–1	2–0	2–2	0–0	0–0	2–4	1–0	4–2	1–1	1–3	2–1	1–0	0–1	0–0
Cartagena	0–4	1–2	4–1	—	2–1	1–1	0–0	0–2	0–2	4–1	0–0	1–0	4–1	3–5	3–2	2–1	2–0	1–1	1–0	1–0	3–4	0–0
Castellón	3–5	1–0	4–1	2–2	—	2–1	0–1	0–2	0–0	0–1	0–0	1–2	2–0	0–0	2–1	0–1	1–3	0–1	1–1	0–0	1–2	3–2
Celta de Vigo	1–1	1–1	2–1	1–0	2–1	—	1–0	2–1	3–1	2–1	0–1	0–1	1–0	1–1	1–1	1–2	0–0	0–1	0–1	1–1	0–0	0–2
Córdoba	0–2	0–1	1–0	1–2	0–0	1–0	—	2–0	1–1	2–2	1–1	2–1	1–0	2–1	0–1	2–1	0–0	2–0	4–0	1–1	2–0	3–1
Elche	2–1	3–0	1–1	1–1	2–0	1–0	3–0	—	2–2	4–0	2–0	0–2	2–5	0–0	1–2	0–1	2–2	4–1	2–1	3–2	2–2	2–3
Gimnàstic	1–3	0–1	0–2	3–2	2–1	0–2	0–2	3–1	—	1–1	1–1	0–1	2–1	1–0	2–3	0–1	1–1	1–2	1–2	1–1	1–2	2–1
Girona	2–2	0–2	4–0	0–1	1–0	1–2	2–1	3–2	0–2	—	1–1	2–0	0–2	0–4	1–1	0–0	1–1	1–0	0–2	0–0	1–0	3–1
Hércules	5–1	3–2	1–0	2–0	1–2	1–0	4–0	3–0	0–1	2–0	—	0–2	0–1	2–1	1–1	1–0	2–1	5–1	1–0	2–0	4–0	4–2
Huesca	2–1	0–1	2–1	0–2	2–0	1–1	0–0	0–0	0–1	2–2	1–0	—	1–1	0–0	1–0	0–0	2–1	1–1	2–3	1–2	2–0	0–1
Las Palmas	4–0	1–1	1–1	0–1	2–2	1–1	1–0	4–1	1–0	0–1	0–0	0–0	—	0–1	0–3	1–0	2–1	1–1	2–1	1–1	2–2	0–0
Levante	1–1	1–0	1–1	1–2	3–1	1–0	0–0	2–1	6–1	3–2	2–1	1–1	1–1	—	2–2	3–1	2–1	1–0	1–0	1–1	2–0	2–1
Murcia	0–2	2–0	2–2	1–4	1–1	4–1	1–1	0–2	0–1	0–0	0–0	1–1	1–0	1–1	—	1–0	0–3	1–1	3–0	0–1	2–2	2–2
Numancia	1–1	3–0	1–3	2–1	2–1	0–0	2–2	4–1	1–1	3–1	1–1	1–0	3–1	0–1	1–1	—	1–1	1–3	1–0	1–1	1–1	1–0
Rayo Vallecano	3–0	2–2	2–2	2–3	3–0	1–2	3–2	0–1	2–3	0–3	4–4	4–1	3–2	0–0	2–0	4–1	—	3–3	2–0	4–0	0–0	0–2
Real Sociedad	0–0	2–0	4–1	1–0	0–0	2–0	1–0	0–1	1–0	2–2	1–0	2–0	2–2	3–1	0–0	2–1	1–0	—	4–1	1–0	2–0	2–1
Real Unión	2–1	1–3	0–0	1–1	3–1	2–0	2–3	0–3	1–0	1–1	0–2	1–1	0–0	2–1	2–0	4–3	2–1	0–0	—	0–1	1–1	0–1
Recreativo	0–0	1–1	2–1	1–0	2–0	1–2	0–0	2–1	0–1	2–2	0–0	2–0	2–0	0–1	0–2	1–3	2–0	2–0	0–0	—	0–2	2–1
Salamanca	3–2	1–1	1–1	1–0	1–1	1–1	1–0	0–1	1–0	0–1	0–0	2–1	0–1	3–2	0–2	1–3	0–1	0–0	3–0	1–2	—	2–4
Villarreal B	2–2	2–2	2–0	0–0	3–1	1–0	4–0	2–2	1–0	2–0	1–0	1–1	2–5	2–2	2–1	1–0	0–2	1–1	3–1	1–1	1–2	—

Source: BDFutbol
Legend: Blue = home team win; Yellow = draw; Red = away team win.

== Pichichi Trophy for top goalscorers ==
Last updated 19 June 2010

Goalscorers	Goals	Penalties	Team
(Spain) Jorge Molina	26	5	Elche
(Uruguay) Cristhian Stuani	22	4	Albacete
(Argentina) Marco Rubén	18	4	Villarreal B
(Spain) Toché	18	1	Cartagena
(Spain) Pepe Díaz	15	3	Córdoba
(Spain) Chando	14	0	Real Murcia
(Spain) Gorka Brit	14	0	Real Unión
(Argentina) Leonardo Ulloa	14	2	Castellón
(Spain) Rubén Castro	14	1	Rayo Vallecano
(Spain) Rubén Suárez	13	0	Levante

== Zamora Trophy for top goalkeepers ==
Last updated 19 June 2010

Goalkeeper	Goals	Matches	Average	Team
(Spain) Vicente Guaita	24	30	0.8	Recreativo
(Spain) Juan Calatayud	34	42	0.81	Hércules
(Spain) Iñaki Goitia	38	42	0.9	Real Betis
(Spain) Toni Doblas	27	29	0.93	Huesca
(Spain) Ismael Falcón	34	35	0.97	Celta Vigo
(Spain) Eduardo Navarro	33	32	1.03	Numancia
(Spain) Rubén Martínez	43	40	1.08	Cartagena
(Spain) Raúl Navas	39	36	1.08	Córdoba
(Spain) Juan Carlos	43	38	1.13	Villarreal B
(Spain) Jesús Cabrero	36	29	1.24	Albacete
(Spain) Biel Ribas	51	40	1.28	Salamanca

== Season statistics ==
=== Scoring ===
- First goal of the season: Quique de Lucas for Cartagena against Girona (29 August 2009)
- Fastest goal in a match: 46 seconds – Carlos Carmona for Recreativo against Girona (2 January 2010)
- Goal scored at the latest point in a match: 90+4 minutes
  - Coke for Rayo Vallecano against Hércules (17 January 2010)
  - Rafa Jordá for Levante against Villarreal B (30 January 2010)
  - Kiko Ratón for Girona against Real Murcia (19 June 2010)
- Widest winning margin: 5
  - Levante 6–1 Gimnàstic (13 March 2010)
- Most goals in a match: 8
  - Castellón 3–5 Albacete (12 September 2009)
  - Rayo Vallecano 4–4 Hércules (17 January 2010)
  - Cartagena 3–5 Levante (22 May 2010)
- First hat-trick of the season: Cristhian Stuani for Albacete against Castellón (12 September 2009)
- First own goal of the season: Dani Tortolero for Real Unión against Girona (26 September 2009)
- Most goals by one player in a single match: 4 – Jorge Molina for Elche against Real Sociedad (19 June 2010)
- Most goals by one team in a match: 6
  - Levante 6–1 Gimnàstic (13 March 2010)
- Most goals in one half by one team: 4
  - Hércules 5–1 Real Sociedad (1 November 2009)
  - Girona 4–0 Cádiz (21 November 2009)
  - Elche 2–5 Las Palmas (3 January 2010)
  - Rayo Vallecano 4–4 Hércules (17 January 2010)
  - Salamanca 2–4 Villarreal B (23 January 2010)
  - Levante 6–1 Gimnàstic (13 March 2010)
  - Elche 4–0 Girona (22 May 2010)
  - Cartagena 3–5 Levante (22 May 2010)
  - Real Unión 4–3 Numancia (22 May 2010)
  - Hércules 5–1 Albacete (30 May 2010)
  - Cartagena 0–4 Albacete (19 June 2010)
- Most goals scored by losing team: 3
  - Castellón 3–5 Albacete (12 September 2009)
  - Cartagena 3–4 Salamanca (12 December 2009)
  - Cádiz 4–3 Albacete (7 March 2010)
  - Cartagena 3–5 Levante (22 May 2010)
  - Real Unión 4–3 Numancia (22 May 2010)

=== Cards ===
- First yellow card: Roberto Trashorras for Celta against Numancia (29 August 2009)
- First red card: David González for Las Palmas against Real Sociedad (29 August 2009)

== Teams by autonomous community ==
	Autonomous community	Number of teams	Teams
1	Valencia	5	Castellón, Elche, Hércules, Levante and Villarreal B
2	Andalusia	4	Betis, Cádiz, Córdoba and Recreativo
3	Basque Country	2	Real Sociedad and Real Unión
3	Castile and León	2	Numancia and Salamanca
3	Catalonia	2	Gimnàstic and Girona
3	Murcia	2	Cartagena and Murcia
7	Aragon	1	Huesca
7	Canary Islands	1	Las Palmas
7	Castile-La Mancha	1	Albacete
7	Galicia	1	Celta
7	Madrid	1	Rayo Vallecano
