= CD Algar =

Spanish football club

Algar
- Full name: Escuela de Fútbol Club Deportivo Algar
- Founded: 1930
- Stadium: Sánchez Luengo, El Algar, Cartagena, Region of Murcia, Spain
- Capacity: 1,000
- President: José Pellicer
- Coach: David Bascuñana
- League: Tercera Federación – Group 13
- 2025–26: Preferente Autonómica, 5th of 18 (promoted via play-offs)
Home colours	Away colours

Escuela de Fútbol Club Deportivo Algar is a Spanish football club based in El Algar, Cartagena in the Region of Murcia. Founded in 1930, they play in Tercera Federación – Group 13, holding home games at Estadio Sánchez Luengo, with a capacity of 1,000 seats.

== Season to season ==
Season	Tier	Division	Place	Copa del Rey
1969–70	5	2ª Reg.	15th	
1970–71	5	2ª Reg.	14th	
1971–72	6	2ª Reg.	16th	
1972–73	6	2ª Reg.	5th	
1973–74	6	2ª Reg.	10th	
1974–75	6	2ª Reg.	13th	
1975–76	6	2ª Reg.	2nd	
1976–77	6	2ª Reg.	2nd	
1977–78	6	1ª Reg.	12th	
1978–79	6	1ª Reg.	13th	
1979–80	6	1ª Reg.	8th	
1980–81	5	Reg. Pref.	15th	
1981–82	6	1ª Reg.	6th	
1982–83	6	1ª Reg.	16th	
1983–84	6	1ª Reg.	10th	
1984–85	6	1ª Reg.	1st	
1985–86	5	Reg. Pref.	6th	
1986–87	5	Reg. Pref.	7th	
1987–88	5	Reg. Pref.	4th	
1988–89	5	Reg. Pref.	1st	

Season	Tier	Division	Place	Copa del Rey
1989–90	4	3ª	15th	
1990–91	4	3ª	5th	
1991–92	4	3ª	20th	
1992–93	5	Reg. Pref.	13th	
1993–94	5	Reg. Pref.	19th	
1994–2011	DNP			
2011–12	7	2ª Aut.	1st	
2012–13	6	1ª Aut.	2nd	
2013–14	5	Pref. Aut.	5th	
2014–15	5	Pref. Aut.	9th	N/A (Note: Reserve team of FC Cartagena.)
2015–16	5	Pref. Aut.	5th	N/A
2016–17	4	3ª	19th	
2017–18	5	Pref. Aut.	3rd	
2018–19	4	3ª	21st	
2019–20	5	Pref. Aut.	5th	
2020–21	5	Pref. Aut.	7th	
2021–22	6	Pref. Aut.	4th	
2022–23	6	Pref. Aut.	2nd	First round
2023–24	5	3ª Fed.	17th	
2024–25	6	Pref. Aut.	14th	

Season	Tier	Division	Place	Copa del Rey
2025–26	6	Pref. Aut.	5th	
2026–27	5	3ª Fed.		

- 5 seasons in Tercera División
- 2 seasons in Tercera Federación
