= Estadio Cartagonova =

Association football venue in Cartagena, Spain

Coordinates: 37.609746°N 0.995977°W

Cartagonova
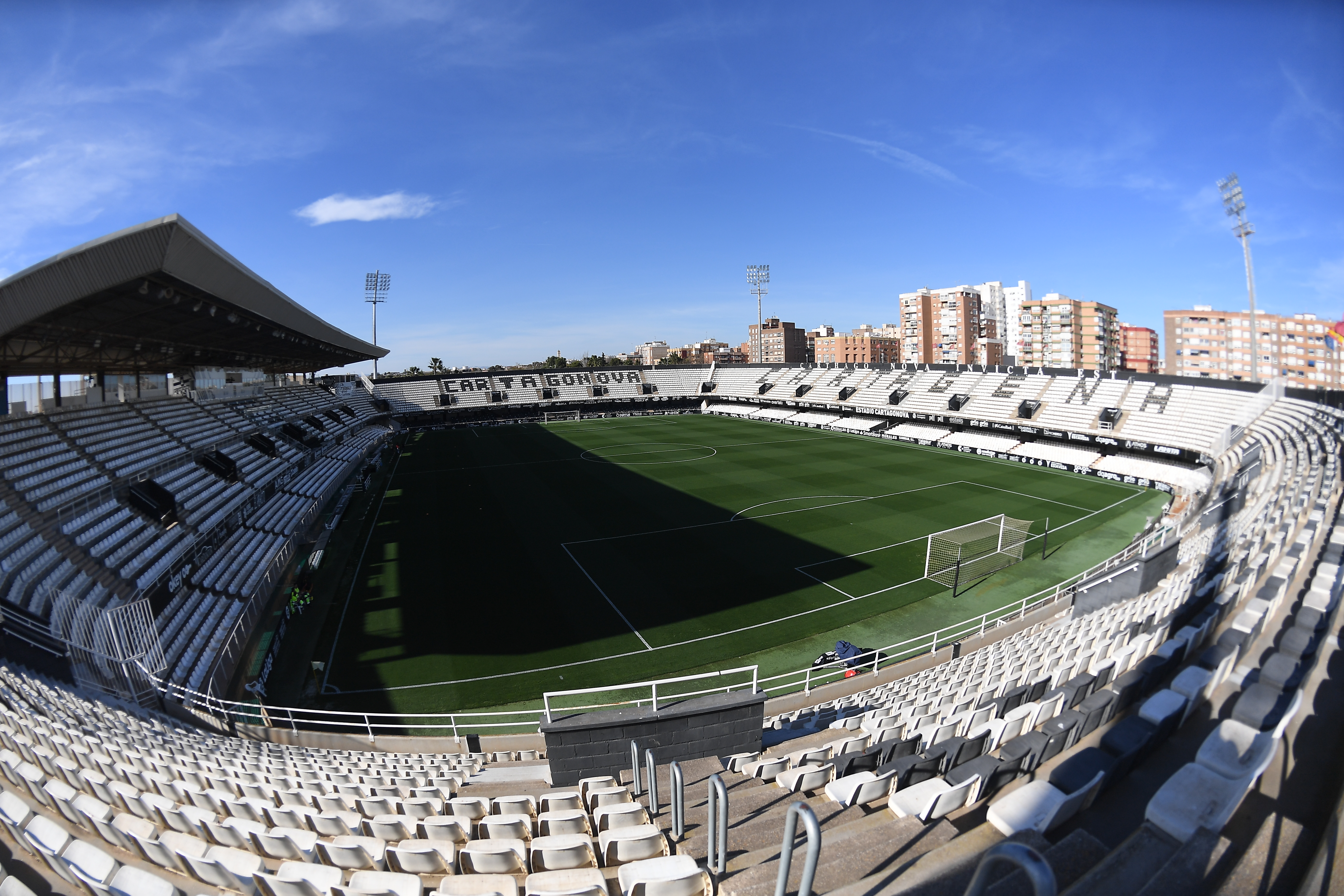
- Interactive map of Cartagonova
- Full name: Estadio Municipal Cartagonova
- Location: Cartagena, Murcia, Spain
- Owner: Ayuntamiento de Cartagena
- Capacity: 15,105
- Surface: Grass
- Field size: 105 m × 68 m

Construction
- Built: 1987
- Opened: February 7, 1988
- Renovated: 2000
- Architect: CMMP Arquitectos

Tenants
- FC Cartagena; Spain national football team (selected matches)

Estadio Cartagonova is a multi-purpose stadium in Cartagena, Spain. It is currently used mostly for football matches and hosts the home matches of Segunda División club, FC Cartagena. The capacity of the stadium is 15,105 spectators.

== History ==
The construction of the football field, was assigned to the project team CMMP Arquitectos (Cardona, Martin and Plaza Molina), Murcia. These gave the bases for the design and construction of the Mini Estadi of FC Barcelona in 1982, designed by the Catalan architect Josep Ramón Casals. Completed in a few months, 7 February 1988 the stadium hosted its first match between Cartagena CF and Burgos CF which ended goalless. Only after 2 games the first goal on the stadium was scored by Uribarrena from Bilbao Athletic.

Since 1995, hosts the home matches of FC Cartagena, in 1998 the team won its home larger to win 8–0 against CD Tortona. The name of the stadium, "Cartagonova", comes from the name of the city of Cartagena during the Roman period, Carthago Nova (New Carthage).
