= CD La Unión =

Spanish football team

La Unión
- Full name: Club Deportivo La Unión
- Founded: 1941; 2000 (refounded)
- Dissolved: 2011
- Ground: Polideportivo Municipal, La Unión, Murcia, Spain
- Capacity: 2,000
- 2010–11: 3ª - Group 13, 4th
Home colours	Away colours

Club Deportivo La Unión was a Spanish football team based in La Unión, Murcia. Founded in 1941, refounded in 2000 and dissolved in 2011, it played its last season in Tercera División – Group 13, holding home games at Polideportivo Municipal de La Unión, with a capacity for 2,000 spectators.

== History ==
In 2004, four years after being refounded, La Unión first reached Tercera División, finishing twice in the top four over the course of seven seasons, but consecutively falling short in the promotion playoffs. In July 2009, it became FC Cartagena's reserve team.

Before the 2011–12 season started, the relationship between Cartagena and La Unión came to an end.

Cartagena-La Unión logo

=== Club background ===
- Club Deportivo La Unión — (1941–56; 1965–75; 2000–09; 2011)
- Deportivo Unionense Educación y Descanso — (1956–65)
- Fútbol Club Cartagena-La Unión — (2009–11)

== Season to season ==
Season	Tier	Division	Place	Copa del Rey
1945–46	4	1ª Reg.	6th	
1946–47	4	1ª Reg.	2nd	
1947–48	4	1ª Reg.	5th	
1948–49	4	1ª Reg.	10th	
1949–1956	DNP			
1956–57	5	2ª Reg.	8th	
1957–58	DNP			
1958–59	5	2ª Reg.	2nd	
1959–60	4	1ª Reg.	11th	
1960–61	4	1ª Reg.	8th	
1961–62	4	1ª Reg.	5th	
1962–63	4	1ª Reg.	14th	

Season	Tier	Division	Place	Copa del Rey
1963–64	4	1ª Reg.	8th	
1964–65	4	1ª Reg.	6th	
1965–66	4	1ª Reg.	8th	
1966–67	4	1ª Reg.	1st	
1967–68	3	3ª	9th	
1968–69	3	3ª	12th	
1969–70	3	3ª	15th	
1970–71	4	1ª Reg.	11th	
1971–72	4	Reg. Pref.	13th	
1972–73	4	Reg. Pref.	19th	
1973–74	4	Reg. Pref.	20th	
1974–75	5	1ª Reg.	12th	

- 3 seasons in Tercera División

=== Team refounded ===
Season	Tier	Division	Place	Copa del Rey
2000–01	6	1ª Terr.	6th	
2001–02	5	Terr. Pref.	10th	
2002–03	5	Terr. Pref.	12th	
2003–04	5	Terr. Pref.	1st	
2004–05	4	3ª	15th	
2005–06	4	3ª	9th	
2006–07	4	3ª	6th	
2007–08	4	3ª	7th	
2008–09	4	3ª	3rd	
2009–10	4	3ª	5th	N/A (Note: Reserve team of FC Cartagena.)
2010–11	4	3ª	4th	N/A

- 7 seasons in Tercera División
