= FC Cartagena =

Association football club in Spain

Cartagena
- Full name: Fútbol Club Cartagena, S.A.D.
- Nicknames: Efesé; Aladrokes; Albinegros; Boquerones; Cartagos; La Cebra (The Zebras)
- Founded: 25 July 1995; 31 years ago as Cartagonova Fútbol Club
- Stadium: Estadio Municipal Cartagonova
- Capacity: 15,105
- Owner: Cortadone Inversiones S.L.
- President: Alejandro Arribas
- Head coach: Iñigo Vélez
- League: Primera Federación – Group 2
- 2025–26: Primera Federación – Group 2, 6th of 20
- Website: fccartagena.es
Home colours	Away colours	Third colours

Fútbol Club Cartagena, S.A.D. is a Spanish football team based in Cartagena, in the Region of Murcia, Spain. Founded in 1995 it currently plays in Primera Federación – Group 2, holding home games at Estadio Cartagonova, with a capacity of 15,105 spectators.

The club is considered to be a continuation of Cartagena CF, founded in 1919.

== History ==
Cartagena was founded on 25 July 1995, in the place of Club Deportivo Balsicas, due to serious economic problems of the first team of the city, Cartagena FC, the first president Florentino Manzano was the founder. In the first eight years it was known as Cartagonova Fútbol Club, and first played in the third division in the 1998–99 season.

The club then changed its name to Fútbol Club Cartagena and Luis Oliver took over as president, starting his tenure with the club immerse in economic problems and close to relegation. Being saved from folding by local entrepreneur Francisco Gómez after the 2002–03 campaign, it consolidated itself in the third level and achieved another promotion, now to division two, in 2009.

Historic side Cartagena FC, which was founded much earlier, acted as reserve team between 2003 and 2009, eventually re-gaining its independence. In 2009–10's second division season Efesé nearly achieved another promotion, finishing eventually in fifth position; all promotion hopes were dashed in the 41st and penultimate matchday, with a 0–1 away loss against Recreativo de Huelva.

Cartagena was relegated from the second tier at the end of 2011–12. In May 2015, a late goal from Carlos Martínez saved the club from a further drop by winning a play-off on the away goals rule against Las Palmas Atlético. Three years later, the team fell at the final promotion hurdle to Extremadura UD by a single goal.

On 19 July 2020, Cartagena was promoted to Segunda Division after an 8-year absence.

On 13 April 2025, Cartagena was relegated to third division after five years stay in second division following a 1-2 defeat to Almería.

== Season to season ==
Season	Tier	Division	Place	Copa del Rey
1995–96	5	Reg. Pref.	2nd	
1996–97	4	3ª	1st	
1997–98	4	3ª	1st	
1998–99	3	2ª B	2nd	Second round
1999–2000	3	2ª B	8th	Preliminary
2000–01	3	2ª B	13th	
2001–02	3	2ª B	12th	
2002–03	3	2ª B	11th	
2003–04	3	2ª B	15th	
2004–05	3	2ª B	13th	
2005–06	3	2ª B	1st	
2006–07	3	2ª B	5th	Second round
2007–08	3	2ª B	8th	Second round
2008–09	3	2ª B	1st	
2009–10	2	2ª	5th	Third round
2010–11	2	2ª	13th	Second round
2011–12	2	2ª	20th	Second round
2012–13	3	2ª B	2nd	First round
2013–14	3	2ª B	2nd	Round of 32
2014–15	3	2ª B	16th	First round

Season	Tier	Division	Place	Copa del Rey
2015–16	3	2ª B	7th	
2016–17	3	2ª B	4th	Second round
2017–18	3	2ª B	1st	Round of 32
2018–19	3	2ª B	2nd	Second round
2019–20	3	2ª B	1st	Second round
2020–21	2	2ª	16th	First round
2021–22	2	2ª	9th	Round of 32
2022–23	2	2ª	9th	Round of 32
2023–24	2	2ª	14th	Round of 32
2024–25	2	2ª	22nd	Round of 32
2025–26	3	1ª Fed.	6th	Second round
2026–27	3	1ª Fed.		TBD

- 8 seasons in Segunda División
- 2 seasons in Primera Federación
- 19 seasons in Segunda División B
- 2 seasons in Tercera División

== Players ==
=== Current squad ===
As of 4 November 2026

Note: Flags indicate national team as defined under FIFA eligibility rules; some limited exceptions apply. Players may hold more than one non-FIFA nationality.

No.	Pos.	Nation	Player
1	GK	ECU	Jhafets Reyes
2	DF	ESP	Marc Jurado
3	DF	FRA	Grégory Kelo
4	DF	ESP	Rubén Serrano
5	DF	ESP	Imanol Baz
6	MF	ESP	Pablo Clavería
7	MF	ESP	Abdel Lah Mohamed
8	MF	ARG	Pablo de Blasis
9	FW	BRA	Marcelo Ribeiro
10	FW	ESP	Ibán Ribeiro
11	MF	ESP	Benito Ramírez
12	MF	ESP	Álex Guti
13	GK	COL	Lucho García

No.	Pos.	Nation	Player
14	MF	ESP	Toni Villa
15	MF	CMR	Jean Jules
16	FW	ESP	Marcos Moreno
17	MF	ESP	Raúl Dacosta
18	DF	ESP	Dani Perejón
19	DF	ESP	Adri Corral
20	FW	ESP	Rubén Richarte
21	MF	ESP	Javi Ajenjo
22	DF	ESP	Nacho Martínez
23	FW	MLT	Boston Billups (on loan from Eldense)
24	DF	ESP	Luca Lohr
31	MF	ESP	Iker Abellán

=== Reserve team ===
Note: Flags indicate national team as defined under FIFA eligibility rules; some limited exceptions apply. Players may hold more than one non-FIFA nationality.

No.	Pos.	Nation	Player

=== Out on loan ===
Note: Flags indicate national team as defined under FIFA eligibility rules; some limited exceptions apply. Players may hold more than one non-FIFA nationality.

No.	Pos.	Nation	Player
—	FW	ESP	Caye Cancela (at Linares until 30 June 2027)

=== Current technical staff ===
Position	Staff
Head coach	(Spain) Iñigo Vélez
Assistant coach	(Spain) David Paredes
Fitness coach	(Spain) Paco Imbernón (Spain) Fran Xavier
Goalkeeper coach	(Argentina) Martín Ragg
Scouting	(Spain) Ricardo Redondo
Delegate	(Spain) Simón Ruiz (Spain) Paco Egea
Kit man	(Spain) Vicente Martínez (Spain) Pedro Arango
Doctor	(Spain) Javier Egio
Physiotherapist	(Spain) Raúl García (Spain) Andrea Alesanco
Podiatrist	(Spain) Rogelio Diz
Nutritionist	(Spain) Lorena Luján

Last updated: 10 December 2025
Source: FC Cartagena (in Spanish)

== Reserve team ==
FC Cartagena B is FC Cartagena's reserve team since 2015. It was founded in that year and plays in Tercera División.

In the past, other sides such as Cartagena Promesas, FC Cartagena-La Unión, Cartagena FC and CD Algar were the club's B-team.

== Stadium ==
Cartagena holds home matches at Estadio Cartagonova. Inaugurated on 7 February 1988, it has a capacity of 14,532 spectators, measuring 105 x 68 meters; it underwent renovation in January 2000.

The ground's biggest attendance was recorded 30 June 1999 in a second division promotion play-off match against Córdoba CF, with 20,000 spectators in the stands. On 26 January of the following year, the first Spain national team game ever hosted in the Region of Murcia took place, a friendly with Poland.

== Kit evolution ==
1995–1998	1998–2001	2001–2002	2002–2003	2003–2007	2007–2008

2008–2009	2009–2010	2010–2011	2011–2012

== Famous players ==
Note: this list includes players that have played at least 100 league games, have reached international status, or both.

- (Albania) Armando Sadiku
- (Equatorial Guinea) Javier Balboa
- (Equatorial Guinea) Sergio Barila
- (Equatorial Guinea) Iván Bolado
- (Equatorial Guinea) Juvenal
- (France) Pascal Cygan
- (Hungary) Sándor Kiss
- (Panama) Alberto Quintero
- (Peru) Juan González-Vigil
- (Poland) Marcin Bułka
- (Serbia) Đorđe Jovanović
- (Spain) Kiko Casilla
- (Spain) Enrique de Lucas
- (Spain) Ander Lafuente
- (Spain) Mariano Sánchez
- (Spain) Toché
- (Spain) Víctor

== Famous coaches ==
- (Spain) Víctor Manuel Fernández
- (Spain) Juan Ignacio Martínez
- (Spain) Francisco Jémez
- (Spain) José Murcia
