= 2011–12 Copa del Rey =

110th Copa del Rey

Tournament details
- Country: Spain
- Teams: 84

Final positions
- Champions: Barcelona (26th title)
- Runners-up: Athletic Bilbao

Tournament statistics
- Matches played: 107
- Top goal scorer(s): Pablo Infante (6 goals)

The 2011–12 Copa del Rey was the 110th staging of the Copa del Rey (including two seasons where two rival editions were played). The competition began on 31 August 2011 and ended on 25 May 2012 with the final, which was held at the Vicente Calderón Stadium in Madrid. Entering the competition, the winners were assured of a place in the group stage of the 2012–13 UEFA Europa League. Real Madrid were the defending champions, but were eliminated by Barcelona in the quarter-finals, who went on to win the title.

== Calendar ==
Round	Date	Fixtures	Clubs	Notes
First round	31 August 2011	18	84 → 66	Clubs participating in Tercera and Segunda División B gain entry.
Second Round	6–8 September 2011	23	66 → 43	Clubs participating in Segunda División gain entry.
Third Round	12 October 2011	11	43 → 32	
Round of 32	9 November; 8; 13 December 2011	16	32 → 16	Clubs participating in La Liga gain entry. Europa League teams brought forward their first leg matches to 8 December.
Round of 32	20–22 December 2011	16	32 → 16	Clubs participating in La Liga gain entry. Europa League teams brought forward their first leg matches to 8 December.
Round of 16	3–5 January 2012	8	16 → 8	
Round of 16	10–12 January 2012	8	16 → 8	
Quarterfinals	17–19 January 2012	4	8 → 4	
Quarterfinals	24–26 January 2012	4	8 → 4	
Semifinals	31 January; 1 February 2012	2	4 → 2	
Semifinals	7–8 February 2012	2	4 → 2	
Final	25 May 2012	1	2 → 1	Hosted at Vicente Calderón Stadium, Madrid

== Qualified teams ==
The following teams competed in the Copa del Rey 2011–12:

20 teams of 2010–11 La Liga:

- Almería
- Athletic Bilbao
- Atlético Madrid
- Barcelona
- Deportivo La Coruña
- Espanyol
- Getafe
- Hércules
- Levante
- Málaga
- Mallorca
- Osasuna
- Racing Santander
- Real Madrid
- Real Sociedad
- Sevilla
- Sporting Gijón
- Valencia
- Villarreal
- Zaragoza

20 teams of 2010–11 Segunda División (Barcelona B and Villarreal B were excluded for being reserve teams):

- Albacete
- Alcorcón
- Betis
- Cartagena
- Celta Vigo
- Córdoba
- Elche
- Gimnàstic
- Girona
- Granada
- Huesca
- Las Palmas
- Numancia
- Ponferradina
- Rayo Vallecano
- Recreativo
- Salamanca
- Tenerife
- Valladolid
- Xerez

26 teams of 2010–11 Segunda División B. Teams that qualified were the top five teams of each of the 4 groups (excluding reserve teams) and the six with the highest number of points out of the remaining non-reserve teams (*):

- Lugo
- Guadalajara
- Leganés
- Alcalá
- Vecindario
- Eibar
- Mirandés
- Alavés
- Real Unión
- Palencia
- Sabadell
- Badalona
- Alcoyano
- Orihuela
- Lleida Esportiu
- Murcia
- Melilla
- Cádiz
- San Roque Lepe
- Ceuta
- Logroñés*
- Oviedo*
- L'Hospitalet*
- Sant Andreu*
- Roquetas*
- Jaén*

18 teams of 2010–11 Tercera División. Teams that qualified were the champions of each of the 18 groups (or at least the ones with the highest number of points within their group since reserve teams were excluded):

- Cerceda
- Marino
- Noja
- Amorebieta
- Llagostera
- Olímpic Xàtiva
- Alcobendas Sport
- Burgos
- Comarca Níjar
- Linense
- Manacor
- Lanzarote
- UCAM Murcia
- Villanovense
- Tudelano
- Náxara
- Andorra
- Toledo

== First round ==
The matches were played on 31 August 2011.

Alcalá, Cádiz, Sant Andreu, San Roque Lepe, Albacete, Roquetas, Orihuela and Alavés received a bye.

31 August 2011	Manacor	1–4	L'Hospitalet	Manacor (Mallorca)
17:00 CEST	Barbón 81'	(Report)	Prats 20' (pen.); Corominas 24'; Cirio 37' (pen.); Haro 75'	Stadium: Na Capellera; Attendance: 800; Referee: Vicente Pintado Calero

31 August 2011	Noja	2–1 (a.e.t.)	Real Unión	Noja (Cantabria)
18:00 CEST	Borja Lázaro 40'; Ramón 104'	(Report)	Romo 69' (pen.)	Stadium: La Caseta; Attendance: 100; Referee: Pablo González Fuertes

31 August 2011	Tudelano	2–2 (a.e.t.) (4–5 p)	Ponferradina	Tudela (Navarra)
18:00 CEST	Miñes 29'; Mena 73'	(Report)	Sergio Rodríguez 10'; Borja Valle 44'	Stadium: José Antonio Elola; Attendance: 600; Referee: Ignacio Hermosilla Alaña
	Penalties
	Apesteguia (penalty scored); David Pérez (penalty scored); Esparza (penalty scored); Martí (penalty scored); Mena (penalty missed); Lumbreras (penalty missed)		(penalty scored) Jonathan Ruiz; (penalty scored) Baró; (penalty scored) Carlos Ruiz; (penalty missed) Alcaide; (penalty scored) Máyor; (penalty scored) Borja Valle

31 August 2011	Náxara	0–3	Salamanca	Nájera (La Rioja)
19:00 CEST		(Report)	De Lucas 50', 80'; Coque 87'	Stadium: La Salera; Attendance: 1,200; Referee: Julio Fermín Leo Ollo

31 August 2011	Andorra	3–1	Lleida Esportiu	Andorra (Teruel)
19:00 CEST	Morales 29', 83'; Drulić 89'	(Report)	Milla 80'	Stadium: Juan Antonio Endeiza; Attendance: 1,000; Referee: Miguel Bosch Domenech

31 August 2011	UCAM Murcia	0–0 (a.e.t.) (7–6 p)	Comarca Níjar	Sangonera la Verde (Murcia)
19:00 CEST		(Report)		Stadium: El Mayayo; Attendance: 1,000; Referee: Saúl Ais Reig
	Penalties
	Juachi (penalty missed); Agustín (penalty scored); Quintero (penalty scored); Salinas (penalty scored); Pando (penalty missed); Rabadán (penalty scored); Cánovas (penalty scored); Menchón (penalty scored); Morillas (penalty scored)		(penalty scored) López; (penalty missed) Antonio José; (penalty scored) José David; (penalty scored) Abel; (penalty missed) Mérida; (penalty scored) Gabri; (penalty scored) Javilín; (penalty scored) Mora; (penalty missed) Roberto

31 August 2011	Amorebieta	0–1	Mirandés	Amorebieta-Etxano (Bizkaia)
19:00 CEST		(Report)	Agustín 54'	Stadium: Municipal de Urritxe; Attendance: 2,000; Referee: Roberto Flores Roda

31 August 2011	Marino Luanco	3–1 (a.e.t.)	Toledo	Luanco (Asturias)
20:00 CEST	Villanueva 37'; Carnero 93'; Sergio Prendes 100'	(Report)	Espinosa 32'	Stadium: Miramar; Attendance: 800; Referee: Adrián Cordero Vega

31 August 2011	Alcobendas Sport	0–1	Lanzarote	Alcobendas (Madrid)
20:30 CEST		(Report)	Toñito 71'	Stadium: José Caballero; Attendance: 150; Referee: Pablo Burillo Naranjo

31 August 2011	Cerceda	2–0	Tenerife	Cerceda (A Coruña)
20:30 CEST	Fernández 57'; Joselu (born 1987)<--- differentiate the three Spanish footballers with mononym "Joselu", two born in 1990, in this article ---> 83'	(Report)		Stadium: O Roxo; Attendance: 800; Referee: Pablo Fernández Pérez

31 August 2011	Leganés	3–1	Vecindario	Leganés (Madrid)
20:30 CEST	Tonino 38'; Víctor 56', 73'	(Report)	Yeray Ortega 14'	Stadium: Municipal de Butarque; Attendance: 1,000; Referee: José Ignacio Hernández Cifuentes

31 August 2011	Burgos	0–1	Eibar	Burgos
20:30 CEST		(Report)	Arruabarrena 14'	Stadium: El Plantío; Attendance: 900; Referee: Daniel Ocón Arráiz

31 August 2011	Palencia	1–3	Logroñés	Palencia
20:30 CEST	Reyes 72' (pen.)	(Report)	Suárez 26'; Manu García 31', 66'	Stadium: Nueva Balastera; Attendance: 600; Referee: Valentín Pizarro Gómez

31 August 2011	Llagostera	4–2	Olímpic Xàtiva	Llagostera (Girona)
20:30 CEST	Pi 32'; Mas 52'; Amagat 61'; Uri Santos 89'	(Report)	Da Silva 44'; Fuentes 65'	Stadium: Municipal de Llagostera; Attendance: 400; Referee: Luis López Muñoz

31 August 2011	Lugo	1–3	Oviedo	Lugo
20:45 CEST	Garrido 59'	(Report)	Rubiato 25', 52'; Diop 50'	Stadium: Anxo Carro; Attendance: 400; Referee: Víctor Manuel Gómez Ríos

31 August 2011	Linense	3–1	Badalona	La Línea de la Concepción (Cádiz)
21:00 CEST	Bello 16'; Isaac 18'; Díaz 60'	(Report)	Mariano Díaz 58'	Stadium: Municipal de La Línea; Attendance: 4,000; Referee: José Ángel Santos Caballero

31 August 2011	Jaén	3–0	Ceuta	Jaén
21:30 CEST	Joselu (born August 1990)<--- differentiate the three Spanish footballers with mononym "Joselu", two born in 1990, in this article ---> 13'; Cobo 25'; Cascón 48'	(Report)		Stadium: Nuevo La Victoria; Attendance: 3,000; Referee: Francisco José Villena Contreras

31 August 2011	Melilla	0–1	Villanovense	Melilla
22:00 CEST		(Report)	Raúl 1'	Stadium: Municipal Álvarez Claro; Attendance: 450; Referee: Raúl Chavet García

== Second round ==
The matches were played on 6, 7 and 8 September 2011.

6 September 2011	Alcorcón	2–1	Sabadell	Alcorcón (Madrid)
20:00 CEST	Quini 90' (pen.); Abraham 90+2'	(Report)	Fito 86'	Stadium: Santo Domingo; Attendance: 4,000; Referee: Antonio Israel Mariscal Sánchez

6 September 2011	Murcia	0–1	Córdoba	Murcia
22:00 CEST		(Report)	Quero 90'	Stadium: Nueva Condomina; Attendance: 3,000; Referee: José Luis Lesma López

7 September 2011	Albacete	1–0	Jaén	Albacete
17:00 CEST	Servando 39' (o.g.)	(Report)		Stadium: Carlos Belmonte; Attendance: 1,689; Referee: Vicente Gil Coscolla

7 September 2011	Noja	0–2	Logroñés	Noja (Cantabria)
18:00 CEST		(Report)	Osado 77' (pen.); Iñaki 90'	Stadium: La Caseta; Attendance: 350; Referee: Eduardo Moro Sánchez

7 September 2011	UCAM Murcia	0–1	Alavés	Sangonera la Verde (Murcia)
18:00 CEST		(Report)	Rubio 47'	Stadium: El Mayayo; Attendance: 800; Referee: José Luis Munuera Montero

7 September 2011	L'Hospitalet	3–2	Leganés	L'Hospitalet de Llobregat (Barcelona)
19:00 CEST	Cirio 29'; David Prats 66'; Pitu 77'	(Report)	Tonino 35'; Aridane 87'	Stadium: La Feixa Llarga; Attendance: 2,300; Referee: Sebastián Ripoll Solano

7 September 2011	Deportivo La Coruña	5–1	Girona	A Coruña
20:00 CEST	Lassad 10', 65', 70', 73'; Salomão 79'	(Report)	Nieto 3'	Stadium: Riazor; Attendance: 19,000; Referee: José Ramón Piñeiro Crespo

7 September 2011	Marino Luanco	2–2 (a.e.t.) (2–4 p)	Andorra	Luanco (Asturias)
20:00 CEST	Carnero 22'; Hermes 44' (pen.)	(Report)	Drulić 14'; Fonsi 79'	Stadium: Miramar; Attendance: 1,100; Referee: Arturo Díaz Álvarez
	Penalties
	Prieto (penalty missed); Álex (penalty scored); Castaño (penalty scored); Cuenca (penalty missed)		(penalty scored) Drulić; (penalty scored) Fonsi; (penalty scored) Gómez; (penalty scored) Reche

7 September 2011	Sant Andreu	0–1	Orihuela	Barcelona
20:00 CEST		(Report)	Gómez 10'	Stadium: Narcís Sala; Attendance: 1,000; Referee: Sergio Usón Rosel

7 September 2011	Recreativo	0–2	Elche	Huelva
20:00 CEST		(Report)	Zamora 17' (o.g.); Palanca 22'	Stadium: Nuevo Colombino; Attendance: 1,500; Referee: Fernando López Acera

7 September 2011	Llagostera	2–1 (a.e.t.)	Cerceda	Llagostera (Girona)
20:30 CEST	Vallhonesta 83'; Mas 106'	(Report)	Fernández 43'	Stadium: Municipal de Llagostera; Attendance: 700; Referee: Cristian Adrián Lixandru

7 September 2011	Ponferradina	3–0	Roquetas	Ponferrada (León)
20:30 CEST	Yuri 47' (pen.), 78'; Borja Valle 63'	(Report)		Stadium: El Toralín; Attendance: 2,000; Referee: José Antonio López Toca

7 September 2011	Eibar	4–0	Lanzarote	Eibar (Gipuzkoa)
20:30 CEST	Ros 37'; Altuna 39', 83'; Tornero 89'	(Report)		Stadium: Ipurua; Attendance: 2,000; Referee: Eduardo García Ballesteros

7 September 2011	Mirandés	3–1	Linense	Miranda de Ebro (Burgos)
20:30 CEST	Lambarri 1'; Barahona 28'; Infante 89'	(Report)	Guerra 5'	Stadium: Anduva; Attendance: 1,300; Referee: Miguel Sánchez-Seco Otero

7 September 2011	Oviedo	1–1 (a.e.t.) (3–2 p)	Salamanca	Oviedo
20:30 CEST	Falcón 44'	(Report)	Jorge Rodríguez 77' (o.g.)	Stadium: Carlos Tartiere; Attendance: 3,000; Referee: Javier Iglesias Villanueva
	Penalties
	Abasolo (penalty scored); Negredo (penalty missed); Sanz (penalty scored); Moré (penalty scored); Diop (penalty missed)		(penalty missed) De Lucas; (penalty scored) Muñoz; (penalty missed) Márquez; (penalty scored) Cuadrado; (penalty missed) Reyes

7 September 2011	Cartagena	0–0 (a.e.t.) (3–5 p)	Numancia	Cartagena (Murcia)
21:00 CEST		(Report)		Stadium: Cartagonova; Attendance: 4,000; Referee: Francisco Manuel Arias López
	Penalties
	Dimas (penalty scored); Torres (penalty scored); Lafuente (penalty missed); Josemi (penalty scored)		(penalty scored) Álvarez; (penalty scored) Bedoya; (penalty scored) Sunny; (penalty scored) Cedric; (penalty scored) Ladero

7 September 2011	Huesca	1–0	Xerez	Huesca
21:00 CEST	Roberto 46'	(Report)		Stadium: El Alcoraz; Attendance: 3,127; Referee: Alejandro José Hernández Hernández

7 September 2011	Almería	2–0 (a.e.t.)	Guadalajara	Almería
21:00 CEST	Soriano 115'; Ulloa 119'	(Report)		Stadium: Juegos del Mediterráneo; Attendance: 4,447; Referee: Pedro Sureda Cuenca

7 September 2011	Cádiz	3–1	Alcalá	Cádiz
21:00 CEST	Akinsola 33'; Dioni 88'; Pegalajar 90' (pen.)	(Report)	Rodellar 28'	Stadium: Ramón de Carranza; Attendance: 2,000; Referee: Carlos López López

7 September 2011	San Roque Lepe	2–0	Villanovense	Lepe (Huelva)
21:00 CEST	Arroyo 50'; Rubio 71' (pen.)	(Report)		Stadium: Ciudad de Lepe; Attendance: 1,180; Referee: Carlos Moreno Hidalgo

7 September 2011	Hércules	0–3; Awarded	Alcoyano	Alicante
22:00 CEST	Vera 87', 117'; Míchel 105' (pen.)	(Report)	Monterde 74', 119'	Stadium: Rico Pérez; Referee: Dámaso Arcediano Monescillo

8 September 2011	Valladolid	6–0	Gimnàstic	Valladolid
20:00 CEST	Víctor 4'; Jofre 11'; Nauzet 22', 40', 43', 58'	(Report)		Stadium: Nuevo José Zorrilla; Attendance: 6,700; Referee: Santiago Jaime Latre

8 September 2011	Celta Vigo	2–0 (a.e.t.)	Las Palmas	Vigo (Pontevedra)
22:00 CEST	Joan Tomás 96'; Iago Aspas 120'	(Report)		Stadium: Balaídos; Attendance: 5,000; Referee: Iñaki Bikandi Garrido

== Third round ==
The draw for the third round was held on 15 September 2011 at 13:00 CEST at the Ciudad del Fútbol de Las Rozas in Madrid.

The matches were played on 12 October 2011.

Oviedo received a bye.

12 October 2011	Celta Vigo	4–1	Valladolid	Vigo (Pontevedra)
12:00 CEST	Català 10'; Toni 49'; Bermejo 69'; Iago Aspas 78'	(Report)	Marquitos 83'	Stadium: Balaídos; Attendance: 7,227; Referee: Juan Martínez Munuera

12 October 2011	Alcorcón	2–1	Numancia	Alcorcón (Madrid)
16:00 CEST	Miguélez 6'; Riera 46'	(Report)	Díaz de Cerio 33'	Stadium: Santo Domingo; Attendance: 4,000; Referee: Mario Melero López

12 October 2011	Orihuela	1–3	Cádiz	Orihuela (Alicante)
18:00 CEST	Francis 82'	(Report)	Ikechi 14'; Akinsola 42' 50'	Stadium: Los Arcos; Attendance: 3,000; Referee: Ángel Álvarez Pinardo

12 October 2011	Mirandés	3–1	Logroñés	Miranda de Ebro (Burgos)
18:00 CEST	Albistegi 17' (o.g.); Arroyo 25'; Agustín 52'	(Report)	Manu 74'	Stadium: Anduva; Attendance: 4,991; Referee: Asier Istúriz Latorre

12 October 2011	Andorra	1–3	San Roque Lepe	Andorra (Teruel)
18:00 CEST	Morales 83'	(Report)	Berrocal 7'; Rubio 13', 72'	Stadium: Juan Antonio Endeiza; Attendance: 2,000; Referee: Israel Simón del Pino

12 October 2011	Córdoba	1–1 (a.e.t.) (3–2 p)	Huesca	Córdoba
18:00 CEST	Charles 59'	(Report)	Corona 89'	Stadium: Nuevo Arcángel; Attendance: 11,500; Referee: Julio Amoedo Chas
	Penalties
	Charles (penalty scored); Díaz (penalty scored); Quero (penalty scored); López Silva (penalty missed)		(penalty scored) Camacho; (penalty missed) Roberto; (penalty scored) Sastre; (penalty missed) Sorribas; (penalty missed) Gilvan

12 October 2011	Albacete	1–0	Alavés	Albacete
19:00 CEST	Calle 4'	(Report)		Stadium: Carlos Belmonte; Attendance: 4,321; Referee: Mariano Medina Méndez

12 October 2011	Llagostera	0–1	L'Hospitalet	Llagostera (Girona)
19:30 CEST		(Report)	Viale 44'	Stadium: Municipal de Llagostera; Attendance: 1,200; Referee: Juan Manuel Bernal Moreno

12 October 2011	Eibar	0–1	Ponferradina	Eibar (Gipuzkoa)
20:00 CEST		(Report)	Yuri 24'	Stadium: Ipurua; Attendance: 2,518; Referee: Óscar Marín Álvarez

12 October 2011	Almería	1–0	Elche	Almería
20:00 CEST	Soriano 89'	(Report)		Stadium: Juegos del Mediterráneo; Attendance: 3,238; Referee: Alfonso Pino Zamorano

12 October 2011	Deportivo La Coruña	2–1	Alcoyano	A Coruña
22:00 CEST	Domínguez 32'; Riki 66'	(Report)	Gato 72'	Stadium: Riazor; Attendance: 14,000; Referee: David Miranda Torres

== Final phase ==
The draw for the Round of 32 was held on 14 October 2011 at 13:00 CEST in La Ciudad del Fútbol in Las Rozas, Madrid.

Like previous years, Segunda División B teams played against the La Liga teams which qualified for European competitions, this is: four teams from Pot 1 (Segunda B) were drawn against four teams from pot 2a (champions) and the three remaining teams in pot 1 were drawn in the same way with the pot 2b teams (Europa League). The five teams in Pot 3 (Segunda División) were drawn against five teams of the thirteen remaining teams of La Liga (Pot 4). The remaining eight teams of La Liga faced each other. The lowest ranked teams from each match played at home on the first leg and if two teams from a match played in the same division then the first one to come out of the draw played at home first.

The first leg was played on 13 December 2011 except for matches involving teams from Pot 2b, which were played on 8 December 2011 (due to Europa League–Round 6, except for Sevilla which were eliminated from the competition) and the match involving Barcelona which was played on 9 November 2011 (due to Barcelona's participation at the FIFA Club World Cup). The second leg was played on 22 December 2011.

Pot 1 (Segunda División B)	Pot 2a (champions League)	Pot 2b (Europa League)	Pot 3 (Segunda División)	Pot 4 (rest of Primera División)
Albacete; Cádiz; L'Hospitalet; Mirandés; Oviedo; Ponferradina; San Roque Lepe	Real Madrid (holders); Barcelona; Valencia; Villarreal	Athletic Bilbao; Atlético Madrid; Sevilla	Alcorcón; Almería; Celta Vigo; Córdoba; Deportivo La Coruña	Betis; Espanyol; Getafe; Granada; Levante; Málaga; Mallorca; Osasuna; Racing Santander; Rayo Vallecano; Real Sociedad; Sporting Gijón; Zaragoza

=== Bracket ===
Round of 32; November 9, 2011; December 8/13, 2011; December 20/21/22, 2011
Córdoba (a)	1	1	2
Betis	0	2	2
Celta Vigo	0	2	2
Espanyol	0	4	4
Mirandés	1	2	3
Villarreal	1	0	1
Racing Santander (a)	3	3	6
Rayo Vallecano	2	4	6
Albacete	2	1	3
Atlético Madrid	1	0	1
Oviedo	0	0	0
Athletic Bilbao	1	1	2
Real Sociedad	4	1	5
Granada	1	2	3
Mallorca	0	2	2
Sporting Gijón	1	0	1
Cádiz	0	0	0
Valencia	0	4	4
San Roque Lepe	0	1	1
Sevilla	1	2	3
Alcorcón	1	2	3
Zaragoza	1	0	1
Deportivo La Coruña	3	1	4
Levante (aet)	1	4	5
Ponferradina	0	1	1
Real Madrid	2	5	7
Getafe	0	2	2
Málaga	1	2	3
L'Hospitalet	0	0	0
Barcelona	1	9	10
Almería	1	1	2
Osasuna	3	1	4

Round of 16; January 3/4/5, 2012; January 10/11/12, 2012
Córdoba	2	2	4
Espanyol	1	4	5
Mirandés	2	1	3
Racing Santander	0	1	1
Albacete	0	0	0
Athletic Bilbao	0	4	4
Real Sociedad	2	1	3
Mallorca	0	6	6
Valencia (a)	1	1	2
Sevilla	0	2	2
Alcorcón	2	0	2
Levante	1	4	5
Real Madrid	3	1	4
Málaga	2	0	2
Barcelona	4	2	6
Osasuna	0	1	1

Quarter-finals; January 17/18/19, 2012; January 24/25/26, 2012
Espanyol	3	1	4
Mirandés (a)	2	2	4
Athletic Bilbao	2	1	3
Mallorca	0	0	0
Valencia	4	3	7
Levante	1	0	1
Real Madrid	1	2	3
Barcelona	2	2	4

Semi-finals; January 31, February 1, 2012; February 7/8, 2012
Mirandés	1	2	3
Athletic Bilbao	2	6	8
Valencia	1	0	1
Barcelona	1	2	3

Final; May 25, 2012
Athletic Bilbao	0
Barcelona	3

== Round of 32 ==
The first leg matches were played on 9 November, 8 and 13 December while the second legs were played on 20, 21 and 22 December 2011.

Team 1	Agg.	Team 2	1st leg	2nd leg
Ponferradina	1–7	Real Madrid	0–2	1–5
Celta Vigo	2–4	Espanyol	0–0	2–4
Mallorca	2–1	Sporting Gijón	0–1	2–0
San Roque Lepe	1–3	Sevilla	0–1	1–2
Albacete	3–1	Atlético Madrid	2–1	1–0
Mirandés	3–1	Villarreal	1–1	2–0
Almería	2–4	Osasuna	1–3	1–1
Alcorcón	3–1	Zaragoza	1–1	2–0
Córdoba	2–2 (a)	Real Betis	1–0	1–2
Deportivo La Coruña	4–5 (a.e.t.)	Levante	3–1	1–4
Racing Santander	6–6 (a)	Rayo Vallecano	3–2	3–4
Getafe	2–3	Málaga	0–1	2–2
Real Sociedad	5–3	Granada	4–1	1–2
Oviedo	0–2	Athletic Bilbao	0–1	0–1
Cádiz	0–4	Valencia	0–0	0–4
L'Hospitalet	0–10	Barcelona	0–1	0–9

=== First leg ===
9 November 2011	L'Hospitalet	0–1	Barcelona	L'Hospitalet de Llobregat (Barcelona)
22:00 CET		(Report)	Iniesta 41'	Stadium: La Feixa Llarga; Attendance: 2,500; Referee: Carlos del Cerro Grande

8 December 2011	Albacete	2–1	Atlético Madrid	Albacete
20:00 CET	Calle 31' (pen.); Zurdo 62'	(Report)	Adrián 70'	Stadium: Carlos Belmonte; Attendance: 13,000; Referee: José Antonio Teixeira Vitienes

8 December 2011	Oviedo	0–1	Athletic Bilbao	Oviedo
22:00 CET		(Report)	De Marcos 11'	Stadium: Carlos Tartiere; Attendance: 15,000; Referee: José González González

13 December 2011	Cádiz	0–0	Valencia	Cádiz
20:00 CET		(Report)		Stadium: Ramón de Carranza; Attendance: 6,635; Referee: Eduardo Iturralde González

13 December 2011	Ponferradina	0–2	Real Madrid	Ponferrada (León)
20:00 CET		(Report)	Callejón 29'; Ronaldo 74'	Stadium: El Toralín; Attendance: 8,500; Referee: Ignacio Iglesias Villanueva

13 December 2011	Mirandés	1–1	Villarreal	Miranda de Ebro (Burgos)
21:00 CET	Arroyo 26'	(Report)	Valero 85'	Stadium: Anduva; Attendance: 4,100; Referee: Fernando Teixeira Vitienes

13 December 2011	Almería	1–3	Osasuna	Almería
21:00 CET	Silva 75'	(Report)	Lekić 16'; Nekounam 31' (pen.); Annunziata 40'	Stadium: Juegos Mediterráneos; Attendance: 2,011; Referee: Miguel Pérez Lasa

13 December 2011	Alcorcón	1–1	Zaragoza	Alcorcón
21:00 CET	Riera 22'	(Report)	Ortiz 7'	Stadium: Santo Domingo; Attendance: 2,500; Referee: César Muñiz Fernández

13 December 2011	Celta Vigo	0–0	Espanyol	Vigo
21:00 CET		(Report)		Stadium: Balaídos; Attendance: 5,000; Referee: Pedro Pérez Montero

13 December 2011	Córdoba	1–0	Betis	Córdoba
21:00 CET	Díaz 90'	(Report)		Stadium: Nuevo Arcángel; Attendance: 7,300; Referee: Carlos Delgado Ferreiro

13 December 2011	Deportivo La Coruña	3–1	Levante	A Coruña
21:00 CET	Álvarez 13'; Saúl 36', 79'	(Report)	Aranda 78'	Stadium: Riazor; Attendance: 10,000; Referee: Xavier Estrada Fernández

13 December 2011	Mallorca	0–1	Sporting Gijón	Palma
21:00 CET		(Report)	Muñiz 84'	Stadium: Iberostar; Attendance: 6,400; Referee: Alfonso Álvarez Izquierdo

13 December 2011	Racing Santander	3–2	Rayo Vallecano	Santander
21:00 CET	Stuani 6', 82'; Nahuelpan 88'	(Report)	Míchel 44'; Michu 63'	Stadium: El Sardinero; Attendance: 5,000; Referee: Javier Turienzo Álvarez

13 December 2011	Getafe	0–1	Málaga	Getafe
21:00 CET		(Report)	Juanmi 84'	Stadium: Coliseum Alfonso Pérez; Attendance: 5,000; Referee: Alberto Undiano Mallenco

13 December 2011	Real Sociedad	4–1	Granada	San Sebastián
21:00 CET	Griezmann 4'; Prieto 7', 63'; Ifrán 90'	(Report)	Geijo 72'	Stadium: Anoeta; Attendance: 18,000; Referee: Miguel Ayza Gámez

13 December 2011	San Roque Lepe	0–1	Sevilla	Lepe (Huelva)
22:00 CET		(Report)	Kanouté 11'	Stadium: Ciudad de Lepe; Attendance: 2,500; Referee: Carlos Velasco Carballo

=== Second leg ===
20 December 2011	Real Madrid	5–1 (7–1 agg.)	Ponferradina	Madrid
20:00 CET	Callejón 25', 88'; Şahin 45'; Varane 49'; Joselu (born March 1990)<--- differentiate the three Spanish footballers with mononym "Joselu", two born in 1990, in this article ---> 79'	(Report)	Acorán 53'	Stadium: Santiago Bernabéu; Attendance: 52,000; Referee: Miguel Ayza Gámez

20 December 2011	Espanyol	4–2 (4–2 agg.)	Celta Vigo	Cornellà de Llobregat
20:00 CET	Weiss 30'; Vázquez 48'; Mallo 57' (o.g.); García 68'	(Report)	Rodríguez 62', 90'	Stadium: Cornellà-El Prat; Attendance: 11,410; Referee: Carlos Velasco Carballo

20 December 2011	Sporting Gijón	0–2 (1–2 agg.)	Mallorca	Gijón
20:00 CET		(Report)	Menéndez 19' (o.g.); Nsue 70'	Stadium: El Molinón; Attendance: 6,000; Referee: David Fernández Borbalán

20 December 2011	Sevilla	2–1 (3–1 agg.)	San Roque Lepe	Seville
22:00 CET	Kanouté 53' (pen.), 62'	(Report)	Pavón 79'	Stadium: Ramón Sánchez Pizjuán; Attendance: 10,000; Referee: Fernando Teixeira Vitienes

21 December 2011	Atlético Madrid	0–1 (1–3 agg.)	Albacete	Madrid
20:00 CET		(Report)	Curto 1'	Stadium: Vicente Calderón; Attendance: 15,000; Referee: Alfonso Álvarez Izquierdo

21 December 2011	Villarreal	0–2 (1–3 agg.)	Mirandés	Villarreal (Castellón)
21:00 CET		(Report)	Infante 60', 87'	Stadium: El Madrigal; Attendance: 12,000; Referee: Miguel Pérez Lasa

21 December 2011	Osasuna	1–1 (4–1 agg.)	Almería	Pamplona
21:00 CET	Lamah 79'	(Report)	Goitom 85'	Stadium: Reyno de Navarra; Attendance: 8,801; Referee: Carlos del Cerro Grande

21 December 2011	Zaragoza	0–2 (0–2 agg.)	Alcorcón	Zaragoza
21:00 CET		(Report)	Riera 86'; Quini 89'	Stadium: La Romareda; Attendance: 4,000; Referee: Ignacio Iglesias Villanueva

21 December 2011	Betis	2–1 (2–2a agg.)	Córdoba	Seville
21:00 CET	Molina 34', 54'	(Report)	García 17'	Stadium: Benito Villamarín; Attendance: 27,000; Referee: Eduardo Iturralde González

21 December 2011	Levante	4–1 (a.e.t.) (5–4 agg.)	Deportivo La Coruña	Valencia
21:00 CET	El Zhar 14'; Ballesteros 37'; Suárez 79'; Koné 100'	(Report)	Álvarez 24' (pen.)	Stadium: Ciutat de València; Attendance: 8,500; Referee: José Paradas Romero

21 December 2011	Rayo Vallecano	4–3 (6–6a agg.)	Racing Santander	Madrid
21:00 CET	Torrejón 33' (o.g.); Michu 36'; Delibašić 40'; Tamudo 61'	(Report)	Tziolis 8'; Stuani 52', 73' (pen.)	Stadium: Campo de Vallecas; Attendance: 8,050; Referee: Carlos Delgado Ferreiro

21 December 2011	Málaga	2–2 (3–2 agg.)	Getafe	Málaga
21:00 CET	Van Nistelrooy 45'; Buonanotte 86'	(Report)	Caballero 51' (o.g.); Mané 79'	Stadium: La Rosaleda; Attendance: 6,000; Referee: Carlos Clos Gómez

21 December 2011	Granada	2–1 (3–5 agg.)	Real Sociedad	Granada
21:00 CET	Siqueira 19' (pen.); Geijo 66'	(Report)	Agirretxe 83'	Stadium: Los Cármenes; Attendance: 18,000; Referee: Antonio Mateu Lahoz

21 December 2011	Athletic Bilbao	1–0 (2–0 agg.)	Real Oviedo	Bilbao
22:00 CET	Herrera 73'	(Report)		Stadium: San Mamés; Attendance: 18,000; Referee: José Antonio Teixeira Vitienes

22 December 2011	Valencia	4–0 (4–0 agg.)	Cádiz	Valencia
20:00 CET	Ruiz 4'; Jonas 26'; Soldado 40'; Banega 67'	(Report)		Stadium: Mestalla; Attendance: 20,000; Referee: Xavier Estrada Fernández

22 December 2011	Barcelona	9–0 (10–0 agg.)	L'Hospitalet	Barcelona
22:00 CET	Pedro 12' (pen.); Iniesta 20'; Thiago 23', 55' (pen.); Xavi 36'; Tello 43', 64'; Cuenca 49', 81'	(Report)		Stadium: Camp Nou; Attendance: 56,480; Referee: José González González

== Round of 16 ==
The draw for Round of 16, Quarterfinals and Semifinals was held on 23 December 2011 at 10:00 CET in the Ciudad del Fútbol de Las Rozas in Madrid.

The first leg matches were played on 3, 4 and 5 January while the second legs were played on 10, 11 and 12 January 2012.

Team 1	Agg.	Team 2	1st leg	2nd leg
Real Sociedad	3–6	Mallorca	2–0	1–6
Mirandés	3–1	Racing Santander	2–0	1–1
Real Madrid	4–2	Málaga	3–2	1–0
Alcorcón	2–5	Levante	2–1	0–4
Córdoba	4–5	Espanyol	2–1	2–4
Valencia	2–2 (a)	Sevilla	1–0	1–2
Albacete	0–4	Athletic Bilbao	0–0	0–4
Barcelona	6–1	Osasuna	4–0	2–1

=== First leg ===
3 January 2012	Albacete	0–0	Athletic Bilbao	Albacete
20:00 CET		(Report)		Stadium: Carlos Belmonte; Attendance: 13,000; Referee: Antonio Mateu Lahoz

3 January 2012	Mirandés	2–0	Racing Santander	Miranda de Ebro (Burgos)
21:00 CET	Infante 33'; Martins 45'	(Report)		Stadium: Anduva; Attendance: 4,100; Referee: César Muñiz Fernández

3 January 2012	Alcorcón	2–1	Levante	Alcorcón
21:00 CET	Borja 13'; Nagore 51'	(Report)	Pallardó 23'	Stadium: Santo Domingo; Attendance: 2,500; Referee: Pedro Pérez Montero

3 January 2012	Real Madrid	3–2	Málaga	Madrid
22:00 CET	Khedira 68'; Higuaín 69'; Benzema 77'	(Report)	Sánchez 9'; Demichelis 28'	Stadium: Santiago Bernabéu; Attendance: 80,000; Referee: Fernando Teixeira Vitienes

4 January 2012	Real Sociedad	2–0	Mallorca	San Sebastián
20:00 CET	Aranburu 17'; Agirrexte 55'	(Report)		Stadium: Anoeta; Attendance: 23,000; Referee: José Paradas Romero

4 January 2012	Barcelona	4–0	Osasuna	Barcelona
22:00 CET	Fàbregas 13', 18'; Messi 72', 90+1'	(Report)		Stadium: Camp Nou; Attendance: 60,000; Referee: David Fernández Borbalán

5 January 2012	Córdoba	2–1	Espanyol	Córdoba
20:00 CET	B. García 81'; Caballero 85'	(Report)	S. García 39'	Stadium: Nuevo Arcángel; Attendance: 19,311; Referee: Alberto Undiano Mallenco

5 January 2012	Valencia	1–0	Sevilla	Valencia
22:00 CET	Jonas 32'	(Report)		Stadium: Mestalla; Attendance: 38,000; Referee: Javier Turienzo Álvarez

=== Second leg ===
10 January 2012	Mallorca	6–1 (6–3 agg.)	Real Sociedad	Palma
20:00 CET	Castro 34', 41'; Hemed 36', 59'; Nunes 38'; Alfaro 53'	(Report)	Ifrán 16'	Stadium: Iberostar; Attendance: 6,500; Referee: Miguel Ayza Gámez

10 January 2012	Racing Santander	1–1 (1–3 agg.)	Mirandés	Santander
21:00 CET	Munitis 34'	(Report)	Infante 72' (pen.)	Stadium: El Sardinero; Attendance: 8,000; Referee: Eduardo Iturralde González

10 January 2012	Málaga	0–1 (2–4 agg.)	Real Madrid	Málaga
22:00 CET		(Report)	Benzema 72'	Stadium: La Rosaleda; Attendance: 27,000; Referee: Miguel Pérez Lasa

11 January 2012	Levante	4–0 (5–2 agg.)	Alcorcón	Valencia
20:00 CET	Barkero 23'; Roger 45'; Iborra 52'; Suárez 66'	(Report)		Stadium: Ciutat de València; Attendance: 10,127; Referee: Alfonso Álvarez Izquierdo

11 January 2012	Espanyol	4–2 (5–4 agg.)	Córdoba	Cornellà de Llobregat
21:00 CET	Vázquez 9', 20', 88'; Dídac 36'	(Report)	Aguilar 40'; Díaz 49'	Stadium: Cornellà-El Prat; Attendance: 15,000; Referee: Carlos Clos Gómez

11 January 2012	Sevilla	2–1 (2–2a agg.)	Valencia	Seville
22:00 CET	Rakitić 70'; Víctor Ruiz 90+1' (o.g.)	(Report)	Soldado 66'	Stadium: Ramón Sánchez Pizjuán; Attendance: 25,000; Referee: José Antonio Teixeira Vitienes

12 January 2012	Athletic Bilbao	4–0 (4–0 agg.)	Albacete	Bilbao
20:00 CET	Susaeta 24'; Herrera 65'; Toquero 78'; San José 86'	(Report)		Stadium: San Mamés; Attendance: 18,000; Referee: Xavier Estrada Fernández

12 January 2012	Osasuna	1–2 (1–6 agg.)	Barcelona	Pamplona
22:00 CET	Lekić 40'	(Report)	Sánchez 48'; S. Roberto 71'	Stadium: Reyno de Navarra; Attendance: 12,498; Referee: Carlos Velasco Carballo

== Quarter-finals ==
The first leg matches were played on 17, 18 and 19 January while the second legs were played on 24, 25 and 26 January 2012.

Team 1	Agg.	Team 2	1st leg	2nd leg
Espanyol	4–4 (a)	Mirandés	3−2	1−2
Athletic Bilbao	3−0	Mallorca	2−0	1−0
Real Madrid	3–4	Barcelona	1−2	2–2
Valencia	7−1	Levante	4−1	3−0

=== First leg ===
17 January 2012	Espanyol	3 − 2	Mirandés	Cornellà de Llobregat
21:00 CET	Weiss 85'; Fonte 87'; Verdú 89'	(Report)	Arroyo 28'; Infante 78'	Stadium: Cornellà-El Prat; Attendance: 22,000; Referee: Antonio Mateu Lahoz

18 January 2012	Athletic Bilbao	2 − 0	Mallorca	Bilbao
20:00 CET	Llorente 35'; Muniain 59'	(Report)		Stadium: San Mamés; Attendance: 38,000; Referee: José González González

18 January 2012	Real Madrid	1 − 2	Barcelona	Madrid
22:00 CET	Ronaldo 11'	(Report)	Puyol 48'; Abidal 76'	Stadium: Santiago Bernabéu; Attendance: 83,500; Referee: César Muñiz Fernández

19 January 2012	Valencia	4 − 1	Levante	Valencia
21:30 CET	Jonas 24'; Soldado 31'; Piatti 45'; T. Costa 90+4'	(Report)	Koné 37'	Stadium: Mestalla; Attendance: 40,000; Referee: José Paradas Romero

=== Second leg ===
24 January 2012	Mirandés	2 − 1 (4a–4 agg.)	Espanyol	Miranda de Ebro (Burgos)
21:30 CET	Infante 57'; Caneda 90+2'	(Report)	Fonte 47'	Stadium: Anduva; Attendance: 5,858; Referee: Miguel Ayza Gámez

25 January 2012	Mallorca	0 − 1 (0–3 agg.)	Athletic Bilbao	Palma
20:00 CET		(Report)	Ramis 76' (o.g.)	Stadium: Iberostar; Attendance: 10,990; Referee: Carlos del Cerro Grande

25 January 2012	Barcelona	2 − 2 (4–3 agg.)	Real Madrid	Barcelona
22:00 CET	Pedro 43'; Dani Alves 44'	(Report)	Ronaldo 67'; Benzema 71'	Stadium: Camp Nou; Attendance: 95,486; Referee: Fernando Teixeira Vitienes

26 January 2012	Levante	0 − 3 (1–7 agg.)	Valencia	Valencia
21:30 CET		(Report)	Aduriz 25'; Piatti 30', 86'	Stadium: Ciutat de València; Attendance: 12,100; Referee: Ignacio Iglesias Villanueva

== Semi-finals ==
The first leg matches were played on 31 January and 1 February while the second legs were played on 7 and 8 February 2012.

Team 1	Agg.	Team 2	1st leg	2nd leg
Mirandés	3–8	Athletic Bilbao	1–2	2–6
Valencia	1–3	Barcelona	1-1	0–2

=== First leg ===
31 January 2012	Mirandés	1–2	Athletic Bilbao	Miranda de Ebro (Burgos)
22:00 CET	Lambarri 90+2'	(Report)	Llorente 18', 27'	Stadium: Anduva; Attendance: 7,980; Referee: Xavier Estrada Fernández

1 February 2012	Valencia	1–1	Barcelona	Valencia
21:00 CET	Jonas 27'	(Report)	Puyol 35'	Stadium: Mestalla; Attendance: 51,800; Referee: José González Gonález

=== Second leg ===
7 February 2012	Athletic Bilbao	6–2 (8–3 agg.)	Mirandés	Bilbao
22:00 CET	Muniain 11'; Susaeta 14'; Aurtenetxe 23'; Llorente 71', 75'; Caneda 88' (o.g.)	(Report)	Blanco 58', 86'	Stadium: San Mamés; Attendance: 39,000; Referee: Alberto Undiano Mallenco

8 February 2012	Barcelona	2–0 (3–1 agg.)	Valencia	Barcelona
21:00 CET	Fàbregas 15'; Xavi 80'	(Report)		Stadium: Camp Nou; Attendance: 69,476; Referee: David Fernández Borbalán

== Final ==
25 May 2012
22:00 CEST

Athletic Bilbao	0–3	Barcelona
	Report	Pedro 3', 25'; Messi 20'

Vicente Calderón, Madrid
Attendance: 54,850
Referee: David Fernández Borbalán (Andalusia)

== Top goalscorers ==
Rank	Player	Club	Goals
1	(Spain) Pablo Infante	Mirandés	6
2	(Spain) Fernando Llorente	Athletic Bilbao	5
2	(Spain) Álvaro Vázquez	Espanyol	5
4	(Brazil) Jonas	Valencia	4
4	(Spain) Pedro	Barcelona	4
4	(Uruguay) Cristhian Stuani	Racing Santander	4
7	(France) Karim Benzema	Real Madrid	3
7	(Spain) Cesc Fàbregas	Barcelona	3
7	(Portugal) Cristiano Ronaldo	Real Madrid	3
7	(Spain) José Callejón	Real Madrid	3
7	(Mali) Frédéric Kanouté	Sevilla	3
7	(Argentina) Lionel Messi	Barcelona	3
7	(Argentina) Pablo Piatti	Valencia	3
7	(Spain) Roberto Soldado	Valencia	3

== See also ==
- List of Spanish football transfers summer 2011
- List of Spanish football transfers winter 2011–12
- 2011–12 La Liga
- 2011–12 Segunda División
- 2011–12 Segunda División B
- 2011–12 Tercera División
