= List of Spanish football transfers winter 2011–12 =

This is a list of Spanish football transfers for the January sale in the 2011–12 season of La Liga and Segunda División. Only moves from La Liga and Segunda División are listed.

The winter transfer window opened on 1 January 2012, although a few transfers took place prior to that date. The window will close at midnight on 1 February 2012. Players without a club can join one at any time, either during or in between transfer windows. Clubs below La Liga level can also sign players on loan at any time. If need be, clubs can sign a goalkeeper on an emergency loan, if all others are unavailable.

== Winter 2011–12 transfer window ==
Date	Name	Moving from	Moving to	Fee
14 September 2011	(Spain) David Rivas	Free agent	(Spain) SD Huesca	Free
27 September 2011	(Spain) Antonio Tomás	Free agent	(Spain) Real Zaragoza	Free
11 October 2011	(Australia) David Carney	Free agent	(Spain) AD Alcorcón	Free
9 November 2011	(Spain) Fran Piera	(Spain) CD Puertollano	(Spain) CE Sabadell FC	Free
11 November 2011	(Belgium) Marvin Ogunjimi	(Belgium) K.R.C. Genk	(Spain) RCD Mallorca	€2.4m
15 November 2011	(Spain) Óscar Sielva	(Spain) RCD Espanyol	(Spain) Atlético Malagueño	Free
13 December 2011	(Belarus) Alexander Hleb	(Germany) VfL Wolfsburg	(Spain) FC Barcelona	Loan return
28 December 2011	(Venezuela) Juan Guerra	(Spain) UD Las Palmas	(Venezuela) Caracas FC	Loan return
29 December 2011	(Spain) Daniel Erencia	(Spain) Terrassa FC	(Spain) Girona FC	Free
29 December 2011	(Brazil) Tiago Dutra	(Spain) Villarreal CF B	(Brazil) Criciúma Esporte Clube	Free
29 December 2011	(Spain) Fran Mérida	(Portugal) S.C. Braga	(Spain) Atlético Madrid	Loan return
30 December 2011	(Spain) Daniel Abalo	(Spain) Celta de Vigo	(Spain) Gimnàstic de Tarragona	Loan
30 December 2011	(Spain) Óscar Díaz	(Spain) Xerez CD	(Spain) Girona FC	Free
30 December 2011	(Cameroon) Emanuel Omgba	(Spain) Huracán CF	(Spain) Girona FC	Free
30 December 2011	(Spain) Raúl Llorente	(Spain) Xerez CD	(Spain) CD Tenerife	Free
30 December 2011	(Serbia) Duško Tošić	(Spain) Real Betis	(Serbia) Red Star Belgrade	Loan return
1 January 2012	(France) Yohan Mollo	(Spain) Granada CF	(France) AS Nancy	Loan
3 January 2012	(Spain) Néstor Susaeta	(Spain) Rayo Vallecano	(Switzerland) FC Lausanne-Sport	Free
4 January 2012	(Argentina) Leonardo Ponzio	(Spain) Real Zaragoza	(Argentina) CA River Plate	Free
4 January 2012	(Spain) Fernando Vega	Free agent	(Spain) Recreativo de Huelva	Free
4 January 2012	(Spain) José Antonio Llamas	(Spain) CD Leganés	(Spain) SD Huesca	Free
4 January 2012	(Spain) Ekhi Senar	(Spain) SD Huesca	(Spain) CA Osasuna	Loan return
5 January 2012	(Spain) José Antonio Reyes	(Spain) Atlético Madrid	(Spain) Sevilla FC	€3.5m
5 January 2012	(Uruguay) Nicolás Raimondi	(Bolivia) The Strongest	(Spain) FC Cartagena	Free
9 January 2012	(Chile) Matías Campos	(Chile) Audax Italiano	(Spain) Granada CF	€3m
9 January 2012	(Spain) Toni Vela	(Spain) CE L'Hospitalet	(Spain) Villarreal CF	Loan return
9 January 2012	(Spain) Toni Vela	(Spain) Villarreal CF	(Spain) UE Sant Andreu	Loan
9 January 2012	(Spain) Mikel Orbegozo	(Spain) Athletic Bilbao	(Spain) Gimnàstic de Tarragona	Loan
9 January 2012	(Spain) Antonio Hidalgo	Free agent	(Spain) CE Sabadell FC	Free
9 January 2012	(Argentina) Matías Ballini	(Argentina) Rosario Central	(Spain) Girona FC	Loan
10 January 2012	(Brazil) Gabriel Silva	(Italy) Udinese Calcio	(Spain) Granada CF	Loan
11 January 2012	(Spain) Guillermo Méndez	(Spain) Sporting de Gijón	(Spain) Marino de Luanco	Loan
11 January 2012	(Spain) Javier Hervás	(Spain) Córdoba CF	(Spain) Sevilla FC	€1.5m
11 January 2012	(Spain) Javier Hervás	(Spain) Sevilla FC	(Spain) Córdoba CF	Loan
11 January 2012	(Argentina) Fernando Barrientos	(Argentina) Club Atlético Lanús	(Spain) Villarreal CF B	Loan
11 January 2012	(Cameroon) Carlos Kameni	(Spain) RCD Espanyol	(Spain) Málaga CF	Free
11 January 2012	(Spain) Pedro Barrancos	(Spain) Cádiz CF	(Spain) Granada CF	Loan return
11 January 2012	(Spain) Pedro Barrancos	(Spain) Granada CF	(Spain) CF La Unión	Loan
11 January 2012	(Brazil) Maxwell Andrade	(Spain) FC Barcelona	(France) Paris Saint-Germain	€3.5m
11 January 2012	(Spain) Catú	(Spain) Celta de Vigo	(Spain) Real Oviedo	Loan
12 January 2012	(Czech Republic) Daniel Pudil	(Belgium) K.R.C. Genk	(Spain) Granada CF	Free
12 January 2012	(Greece) Dimitrios Papadopoulos	(Spain) Celta de Vigo	(Greece) Levadiakos F.C.	Loan
12 January 2012	(Brazil) Wellington Silva	(Spain) Levante UD	(England) Arsenal	Loan return
12 January 2012	(Brazil) Wellington Silva	(England) Arsenal	(Spain) CD Alcoyano	Loan
12 January 2012	(Spain) Félix Rial	(Spain) Celta de Vigo	(Spain) Alondras CF	Loan
12 January 2012	(Croatia) Tomislav Dujmović	(Russia) FC Dynamo Moscow	(Spain) Real Zaragoza	Loan
12 January 2012	(Spain) Carlos Aranda	(Spain) Levante UD	(Spain) Real Zaragoza	Free
13 January 2012	(Chile) Matías Campos	(Spain) Granada CF	(Chile) Universidad Católica	Loan
13 January 2012	(Spain) José María Cases	(Spain) Orihuela CF	(Spain) Granada CF	€0.02m
13 January 2012	(Spain) José María Cases	(Spain) Granada CF	(Spain) Cádiz CF	Loan
13 January 2012	(Spain) Kike Tortosa	(Spain) Recreativo de Huelva	(Spain) Deportivo Alavés	Free
14 January 2012	(Spain) Borja Gómez	(Ukraine) FC Karpaty Lviv	(Spain) Granada CF	Loan
15 January 2012	(Spain) Héctor Ladero	(Spain) CD Numancia	(Spain) Celta de Vigo	Free
16 January 2012	(Spain) José Collado	(Portugal) S.C. Braga	(Spain) CD Guadalajara	Loan
17 January 2012	(Czech Republic) Daniel Pudil	(Spain) Granada CF	(Italy) A.C. Cesena	Loan
17 January 2012	(Spain) Gorka Eraña	(Spain) Athletic Bilbao	(Spain) Barakaldo CF	Loan
17 January 2012	(Spain) Jordi Figueras	(Spain) Rayo Vallecano	(Russia) FC Rubin Kazan	Loan return
17 January 2012	(Spain) Héctor Rodas	(Spain) Levante UD	(Spain) Elche CF	Loan
17 January 2012	(Spain) Héctor Font	(Spain) Recreativo de Huelva	(Spain) FC Cartagena	Free
17 January 2012	(Senegal) Baba Diawara	(Portugal) C.S. Marítimo	(Spain) Sevilla FC	€3m
18 January 2012	(Spain) Jonathan Soriano	(Spain) FC Barcelona	(Austria) FC Red Bull Salzburg	€0.7m
19 January 2012	(Spain) Jorge Galán	(Scotland) Kilmarnock F.C.	(Spain) CA Osasuna	Loan return
19 January 2012	(Spain) Jorge Galán	(Spain) CA Osasuna	(Spain) Real Unión	Loan
19 January 2012	(Spain) Ekhi Senar	(Spain) CA Osasuna	(Spain) Real Unión	Loan
19 January 2012	(Brazil) Gilvan Gomes	(Spain) SD Huesca	(Spain) Hércules CF	Free
19 January 2012	(Spain) Apoño	(Spain) Málaga CF	(Spain) Real Zaragoza	Loan
20 January 2012	(Peru) Damián Ísmodes	(Spain) Racing Santander	(Peru) Universitario de Deportes	Free
20 January 2012	(Spain) Carlos Tomás	(Spain) Villarreal CF B	(Spain) SD Ponferradina	Free
20 January 2012	(Spain) Fofo	(Spain) Villarreal CF B	(Spain) SD Ponferradina	Free
20 January 2012	(Spain) Luismi Loro	(Spain) Elche CF	(Spain) CD Tenerife	Free
20 January 2012	(Spain) Omar Ramos	(Spain) UD Almería	(Spain) CD Tenerife	Loan return
20 January 2012	(Spain) Omar Ramos	(Spain) CD Tenerife	(Spain) SD Huesca	Loan
20 January 2012	(Brazil) Paulão	(France) AS Saint-Étienne	(Spain) Real Betis	Loan
21 January 2012	(Spain) Pedro Mosquera	(Spain) Getafe CF	(Spain) Real Madrid Castilla	Loan
21 January 2012	(Spain) Jordi Pablo	(Spain) Villarreal CF B	(Spain) Atlético Madrid B	Free
21 January 2012	(Portugal) Mano	(Spain) Villarreal CF B	(Greece) Levadiakos F.C.	Free
22 January 2012	(France) Hugo Bargas	(Argentina) All Boys	(Spain) Gimnàstic de Tarragona	Free
23 January 2012	(Spain) Javi González	(Spain) CD Guadalajara	(Spain) Atlético Madrid C	Free
23 January 2012	(Brazil) Pedro Botelho	(Spain) Rayo Vallecano	(England) Arsenal	Loan return
23 January 2012	(Brazil) Pedro Botelho	(England) Arsenal	(Spain) Levante UD	Loan
23 January 2012	(Brazil) Diego Costa	(Spain) Atlético Madrid	(Spain) Rayo Vallecano	Loan
23 January 2012	(Spain) Ángel Ortega	(Spain) Villarreal CF B	(Spain) SD Eibar	Free
24 January 2012	(Portugal) Yago Fernández	(Sweden) Malmö FF	(Spain) Girona FC	Free
24 January 2012	(Denmark) Kris Stadsgaard	(Spain) Málaga CF	(Denmark) F.C. Copenhagen	Free
24 January 2012	(Portugal) Salvador Agra	(Portugal) S.C. Olhanense	(Spain) Real Betis	€0.3m
24 January 2012	(Portugal) Salvador Agra	(Spain) Real Betis	(Portugal) S.C. Olhanense	Loan
24 January 2012	(Uruguay) Martín Cáceres	(Spain) Sevilla FC	(Italy) Juventus FC	Loan
24 January 2012	(Spain) Óscar Serrano	(Spain) Racing de Santander	(Spain) Levante UD	Free
24 January 2012	(Argentina) Ariel Nahuelpan	(Spain) Racing de Santander	(Ecuador) LDU Quito	Free
25 January 2012	(Spain) Tati Maldonado	(Spain) FC Cartagena	(Spain) Xerez CD	Free
25 January 2012	(Argentina) Jesús Dátolo	(Spain) RCD Espanyol	(Brazil) Sport Club Internacional	Free
26 January 2012	(Spain) Ximo Navarro	(Spain) Recreativo de Huelva	(Spain) RCD Mallorca	Loan return
26 January 2012	(Spain) Ximo Navarro	(Spain) RCD Mallorca	(Spain) Córdoba CF	Loan
26 January 2012	(Spain) Juan Cala	(Greece) AEK Athens	(Spain) Sevilla FC	Loan return
26 January 2012	(Argentina) Emiliano Armenteros	(Spain) Sevilla FC	(Spain) Rayo Vallecano	Loan
27 January 2012	(Spain) Aloisio	Free agent	(Spain) CD Alcoyano	Free
27 January 2012	(Spain) Oriol Torres	(Spain) CE Sabadell FC	(Spain) CE L'Hospitalet	Loan
27 January 2012	(Spain) Jorge Pulido	(Spain) Atlético Madrid	(Spain) Rayo Vallecano	Loan
28 January 2012	(Spain) Braulio Nóbrega	Free agent	(Spain) FC Cartagena	Free
28 January 2012	(Spain) Luis Morán	(Spain) Sporting de Gijón	(Cyprus) AEK Larnaca	Loan
28 January 2012	(Spain) Ezequiel Calvente	(Spain) Real Betis	(Spain) CE Sabadell FC	Loan
28 January 2012	(Spain) Juan Calahorro	(Spain) Real Betis	(Spain) Xerez CD	Loan
28 January 2012	(Spain) Nicolás Cháfer	(Spain) Villarreal CF B	(Spain) UD Melilla	Loan
29 January 2012	(Spain) Nano	(Spain) Levante UD	(China) Guizhou Renhe	€0.5m
29 January 2012	(Spain) Cristóbal Márquez	(Ukraine) FC Karpaty Lviv	(Spain) Elche CF	Loan
29 January 2012	(Spain) David Torres	(Spain) Albacete Balompié	(Spain) CD Alcoyano	Free
29 January 2012	(Spain) Kike López	(Spain) Villarreal CF B	(Spain) CD Tenerife	Free
29 January 2012	(Portugal) Edinho	(Spain) Málaga CF	(Portugal) Académica de Coimbra	Loan
30 January 2012	(Spain) Joseba del Olmo	(Spain) Hércules CF	(Spain) SD Eibar	Free
30 January 2012	(Spain) Nico González	(Spain) CD Tenerife	(Spain) CD Guadalajara	Loan
30 January 2012	(Uruguay) Adrián Luna	(Spain) Gimnàstic de Tarragona	(Spain) RCD Espanyol	Loan return
30 January 2012	(Uruguay) Adrián Luna	(Spain) RCD Espanyol	(Spain) CE Sabadell FC	Loan
30 January 2012	(Brazil) Philippe Coutinho	(Italy) F.C. Interanzionale	(Spain) RCD Espanyol	Loan
30 January 2012	(Spain) Jesús Berrocal	(Spain) CD San Roque de Lepe	(Spain) Recreativo de Huelva	Free
30 January 2012	(Spain) Omar Monterde	(Spain) CD Alcoyano	(Spain) Valencia CF Mestalla	Free
30 January 2012	(Spain) Jesús Rubio	(Spain) CD San Roque de Lepe	(Spain) Recreativo de Huelva	Free
30 January 2012	(Nigeria) Kalu Uche	(Switzerland) Neuchâtel Xamax	(Spain) RCD Espanyol	Free
30 January 2012	(Spain) Juanma Ortiz	(Scotland) Rangers F.C.	(Spain) UD Almería	Loan
30 January 2012	(Italy) Michelangelo Albertazzi	(Spain) Getafe CF	(Italy) A.C. Milan	Loan return
30 January 2012	(Spain) Jorge Larena	(Spain) UD Las Palmas	(Spain) SD Huesca	Free
30 January 2012	(Greece) Alexandros Tziolis	(Spain) Racing de Santander	(France) AS Monaco	€0.2m
31 January 2012	(Kenya) McDonald Mariga	(Spain) Real Sociedad	(Italy) F.C. Interanzionale	Loan return
31 January 2012	(Argentina) Sebastián Dubarbier	(France) FC Lorient	(Spain) Córdoba CF	Loan
31 January 2012	(Spain) Marc Mateu	(Spain) Levante UD	(Spain) Real Zaragoza B	Free
31 January 2012	(Spain) Borja Viguera	(Spain) Gimnàstic de Tarragona	(Spain) Real Sociedad	Loan return
31 January 2012	(Spain) Borja Viguera	(Spain) Real Sociedad	(Spain) Albacete Balompié	Loan
31 January 2012	(Spain) Víctor Sánchez	(Switzerland) Neuchâtel Xamax	(Spain) RCD Espanyol	Free
31 January 2012	(Spain) Marcos Gullón	(Spain) Villarreal CF B	(Spain) Racing Santander	Free
31 January 2012	(Senegal) Khouma Babacar	(Italy) Fiorentina F.C.	(Spain) Racing de Santander	Loan
31 January 2012	(Argentina) José Acciari	(Spain) Elche CF	(Spain) Girona FC	Loan
31 January 2012	(Argentina) Esteban Orfano	(Argentina) Boca Juniors	(Spain) Villarreal CF B	Loan
31 January 2012	(Algeria) Abdelkader Ghezzal	(Italy) A.S. Bari	(Spain) Levante UD	Loan
31 January 2012	(Uruguay) Pablo Pintos	(Spain) Getafe CF	(Uruguay) Defensor Sporting	Loan
31 January 2012	(Uruguay) Pablo Álvarez	(Italy) Calcio Catania	(Spain) Real Zaragoza	Loan
31 January 2012	(Spain) Javi Martínez	(Spain) SD Huesca	(Spain) Real Zaragoza B	Free
31 January 2012	(Brazil) Henrique Almeida	(Brazil) São Paulo FC	(Spain) Granada CF	Loan
31 January 2012	(Argentina) Alejandro Martinuccio	(Brazil) Fluminense FC	(Spain) Villarreal CF	Loan
31 January 2012	(Spain) Antonio Núñez	(Cyprus) Apollon Limassol	(Spain) SD Huesca	Free
31 January 2012	(Spain) Joel Robles	(Spain) Atlético Madrid	(Spain) Rayo Vallecano	Loan
31 January 2012	(Spain) Adrián Colunga	(Spain) Getafe CF	(Spain) Sporting de Gijón	Loan
31 January 2012	(Spain) Momo	(Spain) Real Betis	(Spain) UD Las Palmas	Free
31 January 2012	(Spain) Juan Domínguez	(Spain) Gimnàstic de Tarragona	(Spain) CD Guijuelo	Free
31 January 2012	(Netherlands) Jeffrey Sarpong	(Spain) Real Sociedad	(Netherlands) NAC Breda	Loan
31 January 2012	(Spain) Mario Rosas	(Azerbaijan) FK Khazar Lankaran	(Spain) SD Huesca	Free
31 January 2012	(Japan) Akihiro Ienaga	(Spain) RCD Mallorca	(South Korea) Ulsan Hyundai FC	Loan
31 January 2012	(Spain) Asier Goiria	(Spain) FC Cartagena	(Spain) Girona FC	Free
31 January 2012	(Spain) Airam López	(Spain) Villarreal CF B	(Spain) Córdoba CF	Free
31 January 2012	(Spain) Rafa García	(Spain) Rayo Vallecano	(Spain) Xerez CD	Loan
31 January 2012	(Uruguay) Marcelo Silva	(Spain) UD Almería	(Uruguay) C.A. Peñarol	Loan
31 January 2012	(Uruguay) Sebastián Balsas	(Spain) Córdoba CF	(Argentina) Argentinos Juniors	Free

== See also ==
- List of Spanish football transfers summer 2011
