= Chafer =

Chafer may refer to:

- Chafer beetle, the common name for several species of scarab beetles
- Chafing dish, a food warming dish
- Bead chafer, a material in the bead area of the tire intended to protect the carcass against chafing or abrasion by the wheel rim and against abrasion from the steel bead wires. It also helps to stiffen the bead.

== People with the name ==
- Adrian Chafer (born 1991), Spanish musician
- Daniel Alberto Chafer (born 1981), Argentine footballer
- George William Chafer (1894–1966), British soldier
- Lewis Sperry Chafer (1871–1952), American theologian
- Nico Cháfer (born 1991), Spanish footballer

== See also ==
- Chaffer
- Shafer
