= Daniel Gómez =

Daniel Gómez may refer to:

- Daniel Gómez (entrepreneur), Mexican businessperson
- Daniel Gómez (water polo) (1948–2022), Mexican Olympic water polo player
- Daniel Gómez (hammer thrower) (born 1957), Argentine hammer thrower
- Daniel Gómez Rinaldi (born 1965), Argentine journalist and actor
- Daniel Gomez (footballer, born 1979), French footballer
- Daniel Gómez (fencer) (born 1990), Mexican fencer
- Daniel Gómez Carrero (born 1990), Spanish singer
- Dani Gómez (footballer, born 1992), Spanish footballer
- Dani Gómez (footballer, born 1998), Spanish footballer
