= Ferres =

Ferres or Ferrés may refer to:

== People ==
- Brett Ferres (born 1986), British rugby league player
- Enrique Avellán Ferrés (1904–1984), Ecuadorian writer
- James Moir Ferres (1813–1870), Canadian journalist and politician
- Naomi Ferres (born 1997), Australian footballer
- Oriol Santos Ferrés (born 1986), Spanish footballer
- Veronica Ferres (born 1965), German producer and actress

== Places ==
- Ferres, district of Piesport, Rhineland-Palatinate, Germany
- Les Ferres, commune in Alpes-Maritimes, France
