= Avellan =

Avellan is a surname. Notable people with the surname include:

- David Avellan, American professional mixed martial artist
- Electra and Elise Avellan, twin sisters and Venezuelan actresses
- Elizabeth Avellan (born 1960), American film producer born in Caracas, Venezuela
- Enrique Avellán Ferrés (1904–1984), Ecuadorian novelist
- Henrik Avellan (1902–1991), Finnish pentathlete
- Teodor Avellan a.k.a. Fyodor Avelan (1839–1916), Finnish-born Russian admiral
- Viivi Avellan (born 1977), Finnish journalist and television hosting entrepreneur
