= César Caneda =

Spanish footballer (born 1978)

Personal information
- Full name: César Fernández de las Heras Caneda
- Date of birth: 10 May 1978 (age 48)
- Place of birth: Vitoria, Spain
- Height: 1.77 m (5 ft 9 1/2 in)
- Position: Defender

Youth career
- 1994–1995: Athletic Bilbao

Senior career*
Years	Team	Apps	(Gls)
1995–1999	Bilbao Athletic	112	(0)
1995	→ Aurrerá (loan)	11	(0)
1998–2005	Athletic Bilbao	29	(0)
1999–2000	→ Salamanca (loan)	38	(0)
2000–2001	→ Sevilla (loan)	30	(0)
2001–2002	→ Racing Santander (loan)	38	(0)
2005–2006	Eibar	40	(3)
2006–2008	Cádiz	70	(1)
2008–2009	Alavés	38	(0)
2009–2010	Guijuelo	33	(2)
2010–2015	Mirandés	187	(9)
2015–2016	Racing Santander	32	(1)
2016–2020	UD Logroñés	133	(3)
2020–2023	SD Logroñés	82	(1)
Total		873	(20)

International career
1996	Spain U18	9	(0)
1997	Spain U20	7	(0)
- * Club domestic league appearances and goals

César Fernández de las Heras Caneda (born 10 May 1978) is a Spanish former professional footballer who played as a defender.

He played 382 matches in the Segunda División and 402 in the Segunda División B, in a senior career that spanned more than two decades. In La Liga, he appeared for Athletic Bilbao.

== Club career ==
Caneda was born in Vitoria-Gasteiz, Álava. Another product of Athletic Bilbao's prolific youth system at Lezama, he could never however fully establish in the first team, only playing a maximum of ten matches in two different La Liga seasons, also having appeared in the 1998–99 UEFA Champions League. He was also loaned to UD Salamanca, Sevilla FC and Racing de Santander, all in the Segunda División (he won promotion with the latter two, being regularly used).

After his permanent release in 2005, Caneda resumed his career in the second division. He appeared regularly for SD Eibar, Cádiz CF and Deportivo Alavés, but suffered two consecutive relegations with the last two clubs.

In the summer of 2009, Caneda joined Segunda División B side CD Guijuelo, switching to another team in that tier, CD Mirandés, for 2010–11. On 24 January 2012, the 33-year-old scored in the last minute of a 2–1 home win against RCD Espanyol in the quarter-finals of the Copa del Rey following a free kick from Pablo Infante – the competition's top scorer – as the minnows from Castile and León reached the last-four stage after a 4–4 aggregate score.

Caneda returned to the lower leagues in 2015, going on to represent Racing Santander, UD Logroñés and SD Logroñés and retiring aged 45. In August 2022, he played in a pre-season friendly against Deportivo Alavés B, whose team included his 19-year-old son Aritz.

== International career ==
Caneda won caps for Spain at under-18 and under-20 levels. He represented the latter at the 1997 FIFA World Youth Championship held in Malaysia.

== Honours ==
Sevilla

- Segunda División: 2000–01
