= Fali (footballer, born 1983) =

Spanish footballer

Personal information
- Full name: Rafael Brieva Primo
- Date of birth: 18 September 1983 (age 43)
- Place of birth: Seville, Spain
- Height: 1.95 m (6 ft 5 in)
- Position: Centre forward

Senior career*
Years	Team	Apps	(Gls)
2006–2007	Cerro Águila	?	(28)
2007–2008	Sevilla C	30	(7)
2008–2009	Sevilla B	27	(3)
2009–2010	Eibar	17	(2)
2011–2012	Ontinyent	17	(4)
2012–2013	Orihuela	17	(2)
2014	Arroyo	4	(0)
2014	Villarrobledo	2	(1)
Total		114	(47)
- * Club domestic league appearances and goals

Rafael Brieva Primo (born 18 September 1983 in Seville, Andalusia), known as Fali, is a Spanish former footballer who played as a centre forward.
