= Juan Manuel Lobato =

Spanish footballer

Personal information
- Full name: Juan Manuel Lobato Lobato
- Date of birth: 10 May 1988 (age 38)
- Place of birth: La Línea, Spain
- Height: 1.80 m (5 ft 11 in)
- Position: Centre back

Team information
- Current team: Arroyo

Youth career
- Málaga

Senior career*
Years	Team	Apps	(Gls)
2006–2009	Málaga B	73	(7)
2007–2008	Málaga	0	(0)
2009–2010	Lucena	24	(0)
2010–2011	Cultural Leonesa	22	(0)
2011–2012	San Roque	30	(0)
2012–2013	Espanyol B	25	(0)
2013–2014	Llagostera	19	(0)
2014–	Arroyo	0	(0)
- * Club domestic league appearances and goals as of 21 June 2014

Juan Manuel "Juanma" Lobato Lobato (born 10 May 1988) is a Spanish footballer who plays for Arroyo CP as a central defender.

== Football career ==
Born in La Línea de la Concepción, Province of Cádiz, Lobato finished his youth career with local Málaga CF, making his senior debuts with the B-team in the 2006–07 season, in Segunda División B. On 10 January 2007 he first appeared with the Andalusians' main squad, playing the last 33 minutes of a 0–3 home loss against Real Zaragoza for the season's Copa del Rey.

In July 2009 Lobato signed with Lucena CF. In his only season he was first-choice, totalling nearly 2,100 minutes of action.

Lobato continued competing in the third level in the following years, representing Cultural y Deportiva Leonesa, CD San Roque de Lepe, RCD Espanyol B, UE Llagostera. and Arroyo CP.
