= Diego Reyes (disambiguation) =

Diego Reyes (born 1992) is a Mexican footballer.

Diego Reyes may also refer to:

- Diego Reyes (footballer, born 1979), Spanish football defender
- Diego Reyes (footballer, born 1990), Honduran footballer
- Diego Reyes (footballer, born 2007), Mexican football forward
- Diego Reyes (handballer) (born 1992), Chilean handball player
