= Carlos Carrasco =

Carlos Carrasco may refer to:

- Carlos Carrasco (actor) (born 1948), American actor
- Carlos Carrasco (baseball) (born 1987), Venezuelan baseball pitcher
- Carlos Carrasco (footballer) (born 1993), Spanish footballer
