= Aitor Blanco =

Spanish footballer

Personal information
- Full name: Aitor Blanco Aldeano
- Date of birth: 21 February 1977 (age 49)
- Place of birth: Vitoria, Spain
- Height: 1.85 m (6 ft 1 in)
- Position: Centre back

Youth career
- 1989–1996: CD San Ignacio

Senior career*
Years	Team	Apps	(Gls)
1996–1998	CD San Ignacio		
1998–2003	Aurrerá	70	(1)
2003–2004	Lanzarote	50	(3)
2004–2005	Recreación	34	(2)
2005–2011	Palencia	154	(5)
2011–2013	Mirandés	49	(2)
2013–2016	Amorebieta	87	(13)
Total		444	(26)
- * Club domestic league appearances and goals

Aitor Blanco Aldeano (born 21 February 1977) is a Spanish former footballer who played as a central defender.

He played 439 matches in Segunda División B, representing a host of clubs in the competition. His professional input consisted of 22 appearances for Mirandés.

== Club career ==
Born in Vitoria-Gasteiz, Álava, Blanco only started playing organised football at the age of 21, with CD Aurrerá de Vitoria in Segunda División B. He spent the better part of his career at that level, also representing UD Lanzarote, CD Recreación de La Rioja, CF Palencia and CD Mirandés.

Blanco appeared in 27 games (all starts) in his first season with the latter club, helping it promote to Segunda División for the first time ever. He added six matches and two goals in the side's semi-final run in the Copa del Rey.

On 17 August 2012, at the age of 35 years and five months, Blanco played his first match as a professional, in a 0–1 home loss against SD Huesca. He scored his first goal in division two on 1 September, contributing to a 4–0 away win over Xerez CD.

Blanco left the club in June 2013, and joined third-tier team SD Amorebieta shortly after. He retired aged 39, following 89 competitive appearances.
