= Daniel Gómez (entrepreneur) =

Mexican chemical engineer and entrepreneur

Daniel Gómez Íñiguez is a Mexican entrepreneur distinguished for his appearance in business magazines like Forbes and Inc before the age of 21. He was recognized as the most innovative entrepreneur of the TR35 of 2013. He co-founded the biodiesel company Bioenergy Solutions (SOLBEN), a for-profit business that produces 80% of the biodiesel produced in Mexico.

== Career ==
He founded his first company in early 2009, when he was only 16 years old and still in high school. This enterprise was SOLBEN, a Mexican company that manufactures and sells machinery to produce biodiesel. It was co-founded with his three partners Guillermo Colunga, Antonio Lopez and Mauricio Pareja. The company brought in over $1 million in revenue during its first year of business.

After graduating from high school, he continued his studies as a chemical engineer at Monterrey Institute of Technology and Higher Education. In 2011, he had the idea to create a social media platform that would reduce the communication gap between the Mexican people and their leaders. This project proposal was named "Caras politicas". He had difficulties establishing this project in Mexico, so he moved the project to the European continent and renamed it "GovFaces". It creates a link between citizens of different European nations and their local representatives, as well as their representatives at the European Parliament and European Commission.

== Awards and recognition ==
Gómez has won awards such as the Global Student Entrepreneur Award, Talent and Innovation Challenges of the Americas 2011 Award, New York Stock Exchange Intelius Entrepreneurship Award, Mexican Stock Exchange Entrepreneurship Award and the INC 30 Under 30 Award. At the age of 21, Forbes magazine recognized Gómez as a young and successful entrepreneur with two big companies. In 2013, he was named the most innovative entrepreneur of the TR35, an event hosted by the Massachusetts Institute of Technology that recognizes young entrepreneurs under the age of 35 years old.
