= George Savu =

Romanian footballer (born 1983)

Personal information
- Full name: George Daniel Savu
- Date of birth: 20 March 1983 (age 43)
- Place of birth: Bucharest, Romania
- Height: 1.97 m (6 ft 6 in)
- Position: Goalkeeper

Youth career
- 1993–2006: Sportul Studențesc

Senior career*
Years	Team	Apps	(Gls)
2006–2007	Dacia Chișinău	3	(0)
2006	→ Săcele (loan)	6	(0)
2008–2010	Ceahlăul Piatra Neamț	38	(0)
2010	→ Concordia Chiajna (loan)	3	(0)
2011	Victoria Brănești	6	(0)
2012	ALRO Slatina	14	(0)
2012	Atlético Sanluqueño	14	(0)
2013–2014	Cartagena	3	(0)
2014–2016	Arroyo	49	(0)
2016–2017	La Unión	32	(0)
2017–2018	Minerva	38	(0)
2018–2021	La Unión	53	(0)
Total		259	(0)
- * Club domestic league appearances and goals as of 16 May 2021

George Daniel Savu (born 20 March 1983) is a former Romanian footballer who played as a goalkeeper.

== Club career ==
Born in Bucharest, Savu was a Sportul Studențesc youth graduate. In the 2006 summer he joined Dacia Chișinău, being immediately loaned to FC Săcele.

On 28 October 2006 Savu played his first professional match, starting in a 0–1 home loss against CF Brăila for the Liga II championship. He subsequently returned to Dacia in 2007.

Savu moved to Ceahlăul Piatra Neamț in January 2008. He appeared regularly during his first two campaigns, but lost his starting spot in his third, and was loaned to Concordia Chiajna in January 2010, until June.

Savu subsequently returned to Ceahlăul in June, but after making no appearances he moved FC Victoria Brănești in January 2011. On 26 January of the following year he signed for Olt Slatina.

On 21 August 2012 Savu moved abroad for the first time in his career, signing a two-year deal with Spanish Segunda División B side Atlético Sanluqueño CF. On 30 January 2013 he joined fellow league team FC Cartagena.

A backup to new signings Víctor Ibáñez and Jesús Limones, Savu appeared mainly in Copa del Rey matches, notably in a 0–3 loss against FC Barcelona. On 2 August 2014 he moved to Arroyo CP, also in the third level.

== Honours ==
La Unión Atlético

- Preferente Autonómica: 2019–20
