= Juan Luis Guirado =

Filipino footballer

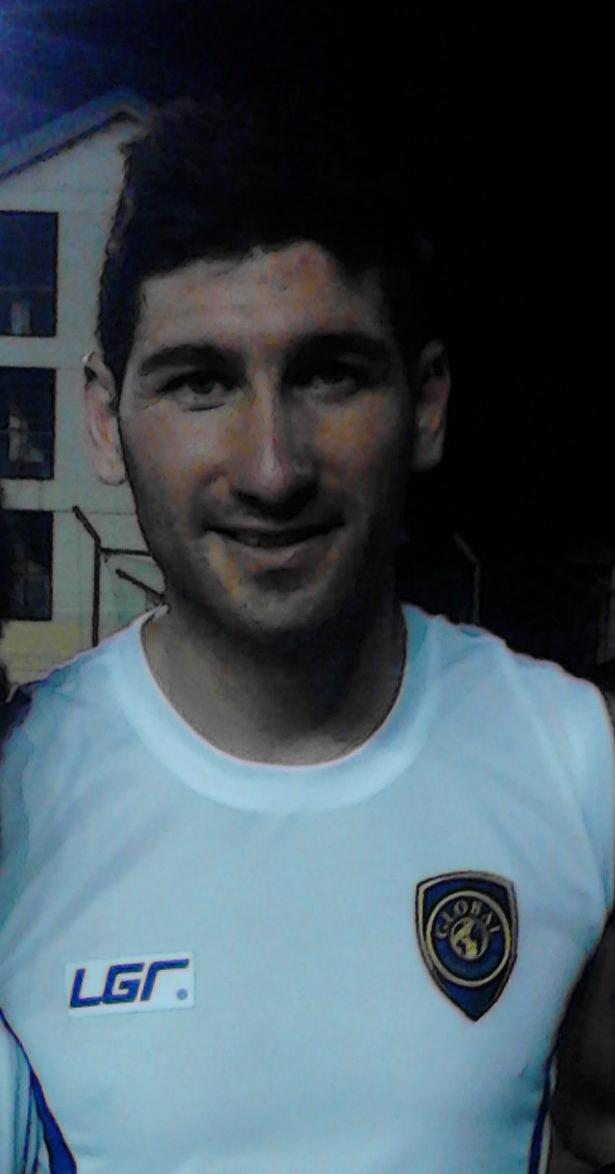

Personal information
- Full name: Juan Luis Aldeguer Guirado
- Birth name: Juan Luis Guirado Aldeguer
- Date of birth: August 27, 1979 (age 47)
- Place of birth: Málaga, Spain
- Height: 1.90 m (6 ft 3 in)
- Positions: Centre-back; defensive midfielder

Youth career
- –1998: Málaga

Senior career*
| Years | Team | Apps | (Gls) |
| 1998–1999 | Antequera B | | |
| 1999–2001 | Algeciras | | |
| 2001–2003 | Mataró | 16 | (0) |
| 2003–2005 | Don Benito | 62 | (5) |
| 2005–2006 | Burgos CF | 19 | (0) |
| 2006–2007 | Roquetas | 30 | (2) |
| 2007–2008 | Reus | 21 | (2) |
| 2008–2009 | Sant Andreu | 18 | (0) |
| 2009–2010 | Marbella | 9 | (0) |
| 2010–2013 | Racing Lermeño | 44 | (6) |
| 2012 | → Global (loan) | 5 | (3) |
| 2013–2016 | Beroil Bupolsa | | |
| 2014–2016 | → Ceres–Negros (loan) | 15 | (3) |
| 2016–2017 | Real Burgos | 29 | (6) |
| 2017–2018 | Briviesca | 22 | (4) |
| 2019–2020 | Inter Vista Alegre | 16 | (6) |

International career
| 2012–2016 | Philippines | 36 | (1) |
Medal record
Men's football
Representing Philippines
AFC Challenge Cup
| Silver medal – second place | 2014 Maldives |
| Bronze medal – third place | 2012 Nepal |
- * Club domestic league appearances and goals as of March 8, 2020

Juan Luis Aldeguer Guirado (born August 27, 1979), nicknamed Juani, is a former professional footballer who played as a central defender or a defensive midfielder. Born in Spain, he represented the Philippines internationally.

Guirado only played in the lower leagues in Spain, amassing Segunda División B totals of 104 matches and one goal during seven seasons. His professional career was spent in the Philippines.

Guirado played for the Philippines national team, earning 36 caps in four years.

== Club career ==
Born in Málaga, Andalusia, Guirado spent most of his senior career in Segunda División B, playing for CD Don Benito, Burgos CF, UE Sant Andreu and UD Marbella. In late January 2012, he left Racing Lermeño in Tercera División and moved to the Philippines, signing with Global FC. On 6 February he made his official debut for his new team, coming in as a substitute midway through the second half of an eventual 1–0 win against Green Archers United FC.

On 26 February 2012, Guirado scored his first goal for Global in the United Football League, against Philippine Navy F.C. in a 5–0 victory. In late March, he agreed on a return to Lermeño for the following season.

Guirado signed with fellow league club CD Burgos in July 2013, under the condition he would still be able to play international football. He retired from competitive football in 2016 at the age of 36, his last team being Ceres–Negros F.C. in the United Football League. His last match was the 16-0 win against Pasargad F.C. on 11 June 2016, where he scored in the 77th minute; he cited family reasons for his decision, which he announced after the game.

In July 2016, Guirado came out of retirement and signed for Spanish amateurs Real Burgos CF.

== International career ==
On 4 April 2011, it was reported that the Philippines national team was eying Guirado for the country's bid in the 2014 FIFA World Cup qualification campaign, but he was not able to suit up for the national squad because of prior commitments with Racing Lermeño. He only made his debut on 29 February 2012 in a friendly match against Malaysia, which ended in a 1–1 draw.

On 19 March 2012, during the third place play-off of the 2012 AFC Challenge Cup, Guirado scored his first international goal to give the Philippines a 4–2 lead over Palestine, in an eventual 4–3 win. On 28 March 2016, he announced his retirement as player and team captain of the Azkals, stating that the 2018 World Cup qualifier against North Korea the next day would be his last match.

=== International goals ===
Scores and results list the Philippines' goal tally first.

| # | Date | Venue | Opponent | Score | Result | Competition |
|---|---|---|---|---|---|---|
| 1. | 19 March 2012 | Dasarath Rangasala, Kathmandu, Nepal | Palestine | 4–2 | 4–3 | 2012 AFC Challenge Cup |

== Personal life ==
Guirado was born to a Filipina mother who hailed from Ilagan, Isabela. His younger brother, Ángel, was also a footballer: a winger, he too spent most of his career in the Spanish third division, and also represented the Philippines internationally.

Guirado worked as a quality control inspector for PepsiCo in Burgos, while playing for Racing Lermeño.

== Honours ==
Philippines

- Philippine Peace Cup: 2013
- AFC Challenge Cup third place: 2012
