= Jesús Rubio (footballer, born 1987) =

Spanish footballer (born 1987)

Personal information
- Full name: Jesús Rubio Martín
- Date of birth: 1 February 1987 (age 39)
- Place of birth: Plasencia, Spain
- Height: 1.79 m (5 ft 10 in)
- Position: Midfielder

Team information
- Current team: Atzeneta
- Number: 18

Youth career
- Plasencia
- 2002–2005: Villarreal

Senior career*
Years	Team	Apps	(Gls)
2005–2008	Villarreal B	60	(17)
2007–2008	→ Talavera (loan)	35	(4)
2008–2009	Écija	28	(3)
2009–2011	Almería B	72	(16)
2011–2012	San Roque	20	(7)
2012–2013	Recreativo	42	(3)
2013–2014	Gimnàstic	28	(1)
2014–2015	Huracán	42	(7)
2015–2016	UCAM Murcia	28	(3)
2016–2017	Villanovense	38	(16)
2017–2018	Extremadura	23	(0)
2018–2019	El Ejido	31	(0)
2019–2020	Ebro	25	(7)
2020–	Atzeneta	10	(0)
- * Club domestic league appearances and goals as of 20 February 2021

Jesús Rubio Martín (born 1 February 1987) is a Spanish professional footballer who plays for Atzeneta UE as a midfielder.

== Football career ==
Born in Plasencia, Cáceres, Rubio began his career with hometown's UP Plasencia, before moving to Villarreal CF in 2002 at the age of 15. He made his senior debut with the latter's reserves in Tercera División and, in the following season, appeared in preseason with first team, featuring in a friendly against RCD Espanyol; he also helped the B's achieve promotion to Segunda División B, in 2007.

Rubio was loaned to Talavera CF in summer 2007, and received the club's Trofeo Halcón at the end of the third level campaign, which ended in relegation. He subsequently returned to Villarreal, opting to terminate his contract to join Écija Balompié also in division three.

For 2009–10, Rubio returned to the fourth tier and signed for UD Almería, being assigned to the B-team and finishing his first year with 39 appearances and seven goals to help them reach the third division for the first time ever. He was team top scorer in the following season, with the side retaining their league status.

On 27 June 2011, Rubio signed a contract with CD San Roque de Lepe. In January of the following year, after a string of good performances (with his side reaching the final phases of the Copa del Rey), he left and penned an 18-month deal with neighbouring Recreativo de Huelva, in Segunda División.

Rubio made his debut as a professional on 4 February 2012, appearing as a second-half substitute in a 0–1 home loss against Deportivo de La Coruña. He scored his first goal for Recre on 8 September, contributing to a 3–2 home success over Real Murcia.

On 20 August 2013, Rubio signed with Gimnàstic de Tarragona in the third level. He continued to compete in that tier in the following years, representing Huracán Valencia CF, UCAM Murcia CF, CF Villanovense, Extremadura UD and CD El Ejido.
