= Haffer =

Haffer is a surname. Notable people with the surname include:

- Fritz Haffer (1914–?), Romanian handball player
- Jürgen Haffer (1932–2010), German ornithologist
- Karl Haffer (1912–?), Romanian handball player
- Virna Haffer (1899–1974), American photographer

== See also ==
- Chaffer
