= Racing Lermeño =

- Full name: Racing Lermeño Club de Fútbol
- Founded: 1984
- Ground: Arlanza, Lerma, Castile and León, Spain
- Capacity: 2,500
- President: (Spain) Óscar García
- Head coach: (Spain) Jairo de La Riva
- 2023–24: Primera Regional – Group A, 10th of 16
- Website: http://www.actiweb.es/racinglermeno/
Home colours	Away colours

Racing Lermeño Club de Fútbol is a Spanish football team based in Lerma, Burgos, in the autonomous community of Castile and León. Founded in 1984, the club holds home games at Estadio Arlanza, with a capacity of 2,500 seats.

Founded in 1984 in the place of CD Lermeño, the club started playing in the Regional Preferente. In 2012, the club decided to create a basketball team to compete in the Provincial League of Burgos.

== Season to season ==
Season	Tier	Division	Place	Copa del Rey
1984–85	5	Reg. Pref.	2nd	
1985–86	4	3ª	11th	
1986–87	4	3ª	4th	
1987–88	4	3ª	8th	First round
1988–89	4	3ª	2nd	
1989–90	4	3ª	2nd	
1990–91	4	3ª	10th	
1991–92	4	3ª	5th	First round
1992–93	4	3ª	12th	
1993–94	4	3ª	9th	
1994–95	4	3ª	15th	
1995–96	4	3ª	9th	
1996–97	4	3ª	16th	
1997–98	4	3ª	7th	
1998–99	4	3ª	7th	
1999–2000	4	3ª	8th	
2000–01	4	3ª	20th	
2001–02	5	1ª Reg.	3rd	
2002–03	5	1ª Reg.	4th	
2003–04	5	1ª Reg.	1st	

Season	Tier	Division	Place	Copa del Rey
2004–05	4	3ª	20th	
2005–06	5	1ª Reg.	5th	
2006–07	5	1ª Reg.	3rd	
2007–08	5	1ª Reg.	9th	
2008–09	5	1ª Reg.	1st	
2009–10	4	3ª	13th	
2010–11	4	3ª	17th	
2011–12	4	3ª	13th	
2012–13	4	3ª	16th	
2013–14	4	3ª	20th	
2014–15	5	1ª Reg.	10th	
2015–16	5	1ª Reg.	11th	
2016–17	5	1ª Reg.	6th	
2017–18	5	1ª Reg.	6th	
2018–19	5	1ª Reg.	9th	
2019–20	5	1ª Reg.	11th	
2020–21	5	1ª Reg.	8th	
2021–22	6	1ª Reg.	12th	
2022–23	6	1ª Reg.	9th	
2023–24	6	1ª Reg.	10th	

- 22 seasons in Tercera División

== Notable players ==
- (Spain) Pablo Infante
- (Philippines) Juan Luis Guirado
