= Jesús Berrocal =

Spanish footballer

Personal information
- Full name: Jesús Berrocal Campos
- Date of birth: 5 February 1988 (age 38)
- Place of birth: Córdoba, Spain
- Height: 1.83 m (6 ft 0 in)
- Position: Forward

Youth career
- 1996–2002: Córdoba
- 2002–2007: Espanyol

Senior career*
Years	Team	Apps	(Gls)
2007–2009	Real Madrid C	59	(22)
2008	Real Madrid B	1	(0)
2009	→ Racing B (loan)	11	(2)
2009	→ Racing Santander (loan)	3	(1)
2009–2010	Granada	28	(5)
2010–2011	Ceuta	23	(2)
2011–2012	San Roque	21	(8)
2012–2013	Recreativo	51	(10)
2013	Buriram United	7	(1)
2014–2016	Ponferradina	85	(13)
2016–2017	Hércules	30	(5)
2017–2020	Pontevedra	62	(4)
2021	Villarrubia	16	(1)
2022	Viveiro	11	(1)
Total		408	(75)

International career
2006–2007	Spain U19	8	(1)
- * Club domestic league appearances and goals

Jesús Berrocal Campos (born 5 February 1988) is a Spanish former professional footballer who played as a forward.

== Club career ==
Born in Córdoba, Andalusia, Berrocal spent his first years as a senior with Real Madrid's C team. In January 2009 he was loaned to Racing de Santander, playing with both the first and B sides with the Cantabrians. On 1 March 2009, he first appeared for the main squad and in La Liga, playing the last minute of the 1–1 home draw against CA Osasuna. The following week, again from the bench, he scored in a 5–3 loss at Deportivo de La Coruña.

For the 2009–10 season, Berrocal was released by Real Madrid and signed a two-year deal with Granada CF of Segunda División B. He appeared regularly throughout his first year as the latter returned to the Segunda División after more than 20 years, contributing five goals. However, he would be released in the summer, moving to another club in that league, AD Ceuta.

On 26 June 2013, following spells with CD San Roque de Lepe (third division) and Recreativo de Huelva (second), Berrocal joined a host of compatriots at Buriram United F.C. in the Thai Premier League. He marked his league debut with a goal, in a 2–1 away win over Suphanburi FC.

Berrocal returned to Spain in February 2014, on a contract at second-tier SD Ponferradina. He was sent off on his maiden appearance, a 0–2 home loss to AD Alcorcón, going on to score five goals in his second and third seasons and being relegated in the latter.

== Personal life ==
Still an active player, Berrocal worked occasionally as a model.

== Honours ==
Granada

- Segunda División B: 2009–10

Buriram United

- Thai Premier League: 2013
- Thai FA Cup: 2013

Spain U19

- UEFA European Under-19 Championship: 2007
