= Arroyo CP =

Association football club

Arroyo
- Full name: Arroyo Club Polideportivo
- Founded: 1968
- Ground: Municipal, Arroyo de la Luz, Extremadura, Spain
- Capacity: 3,000
- President: (Spain) Emilio Pajares
- Head coach: (Spain) Miguel Ángel Ávila
- League: Primera Extremeña – Group 1
- 2024–25: Tercera Federación – Group 14, 17th of 18 (relegated)
Home colours	Away colours

Arroyo Club Polideportivo is a Spanish football club based in Arroyo de la Luz, in the autonomous community of Extremadura. Founded in 1968 it plays in Primera Extremeña – Group 1, holding home games at Estadio Municipal, with a 3,000-seat capacity.

== History ==
In the 2018-19 season the club was about to being relegated from the Tercera División, Group 14 by finishing just 5 points away from the relegation zone.

== Season to season ==
Season	Tier	Division	Place	Copa del Rey
1977–78	7	2ª Reg.	1st	
1978–79	7	2ª Reg.	8th	
1979–80	7	2ª Reg.	2nd	
1980–81	6	1ª Reg.	4th	
1981–82	6	1ª Reg.	5th	
1982–83	7	2ª Reg.	5th	
1983–84	7	2ª Reg.	3rd	
1984–85	7	2ª Reg.	5th	
1985–86	6	1ª Reg.	2nd	
1986–87	6	1ª Reg.	16th	
1987–88	6	1ª Reg.	5th	
1988–89	6	1ª Reg.	7th	
1989–90	6	1ª Reg.	5th	
1990–91	6	1ª Reg.	2nd	
1991–92	5	Reg. Pref.	20th	
1992–93	6	1ª Reg.	5th	
1993–94	6	1ª Reg.	2nd	
1994–95	5	Reg. Pref.	11th	
1995–96	5	Reg. Pref.	8th	
1996–97	5	Reg. Pref.	1st	

Season	Tier	Division	Place	Copa del Rey
1997–98	4	3ª	18th	
1998–99	5	Reg. Pref.	4th	
1999–2000	5	Reg. Pref.	12th	
2000–01	5	Reg. Pref.	10th	
2001–02	5	Reg. Pref.	1st	
2002–03	4	3ª	16th	
2003–04	4	3ª	16th	
2004–05	4	3ª	20th	
2005–06	5	Reg. Pref.	7th	
2006–07	5	Reg. Pref.	4th	
2007–08	5	Reg. Pref.	5th	
2008–09	5	Reg. Pref.	3rd	
2009–10	4	3ª	4th	
2010–11	4	3ª	3rd	
2011–12	4	3ª	1st	
2012–13	3	2ª B	15th	Third round
2013–14	3	2ª B	15th	
2014–15	3	2ª B	18th	
2015–16	4	3ª	3rd	
2016–17	4	3ª	15th	

Season	Tier	Division	Place	Copa del Rey
2017–18	4	3ª	17th	
2018–19	4	3ª	15th	
2019–20	4	3ª	9th	
2020–21	4	3ª	5th / 4th	
2021–22	5	3ª RFEF	5th	
2022–23	5	3ª Fed.	6th	
2023–24	5	3ª Fed.	13th	
2024–25	5	3ª Fed.	17th	
2025–26	6	1ª Ext.		

- 3 seasons in Segunda División B
- 13 seasons in Tercera División
- 4 seasons in Tercera Federación/Tercera División RFEF

== Current squad ==
As of 12 February 2015

Note: Flags indicate national team as defined under FIFA eligibility rules; some limited exceptions apply. Players may hold more than one non-FIFA nationality.

No.	Pos.	Nation	Player
—	GK	ROU	George Savu
—	GK	ARG	Facundo Lupardo
—	DF	ESP	Santi Polo
—	DF	ESP	Xesc Campins
—	DF	ESP	David Alcalá
—	DF	ESP	Carlos Tomás
—	DF	ESP	Antonio Gasca
—	DF	ESP	Juanma
—	DF	ESP	Carlao
—	DF	ESP	Arturo Navarro
—	DF	ESP	Iván Moya
—	DF	ESP	Pablo Gallardo

No.	Pos.	Nation	Player
—	MF	ESP	Alberto Bayón
—	MF	ESP	Mauro Cabello
—	MF	ESP	Coco
—	MF	ESP	Pedro Capó
—	MF	ESP	Fran Minaya
—	MF	ESP	Nando
—	MF	ESP	Víctor Armero
—	MF	ESP	Juan Manuel Lobato
—	MF	ESP	Ignasi Dalmedo
—	FW	ESP	Antonio Rojas
—	FW	ESP	Casi
