= Solben (Bioenergy solutions) =

Mexican biodiesel production company

Soluciones en Bionergía (Bioenergy solutions) (abbreviated SOLBEN) is a Mexican biodiesel production company headquartered in Monterrey, Mexico. It is responsible for 80% of biodiesel production consumed in Mexico.

== History of the company ==
In 2008 the University of Tabasco wanted to buy machinery to produce biodiesel, but they did not have enough resources to buy neither foreign machinery nor the ability to pay a loan to the National Council of Science and Technology (Conacyt). By the end of that year, a group of Mexican entrepreneurs offered them their concept of a biodiesel production machine, which fitted with the necessities of the university. This group of young entrepreneurs was conformed by Daniel Gómez, Antonio López, Guillermo Colunga and Mauricio Pareja. As a consequence of this event in early 2009, the four entrepreneurs decided to found a not-for-profit foundation that aim to the development of biodiesel production technology and services. They named their foundation "Soluciones en bioenergía," abbreviated SOLBEN, a mix of the words in Spanish for "solutions" and "bioenergy" (Bioenergy solutions). In that same year, the University of Tabasco made more than $150,000 in biodiesel sales, so the founders of Solben decided to transform the not-for-profit foundation into a for-profit business.

Since its founding, Solben has improved the technology and service offerings and at present, this company is using part of their income from the biodiesel equipment sell in the development of systems that produce biogas and ethanol, waste management and other applications.

Solben has plans to establish 125 biodiesel factories in the United States. The objective of these factories is to sell, after being processed, Jatropha seeds in order to produce biodiesel.

== Products and services ==
The services offered by SOLBEN include both technical and consultation support for producers. The technical branch focuses in the identification of physical and chemical characteristics of oil and seeds. On the other hand, the consultation services focus in the improvement of the economic earnings and correct exploitation of the natural resources.

- Identification of physical and chemical characteristics of oils – Helping both the producer and the consumer to know the main oil quality parameters.
- Identification of physical and chemical characteristics of seeds – Helping producers to sell seeds and to know which is the best equipment for their product.
- Biodiesel quality - Helping producers to know and implement the biodiesel quality assures in order to make the biofuel work in any diesel motor.
- Analysis of co-products – Helping the producer to add value to their product.
- Automation – Providing a control system developed by Solben to generate a simpler way to operate, control, and administrate chemical procedures.
- Technical support – Improving both administrative and chemical processes in the production of biodiesel.

Their products are divided into five different types of machines that allow the producers to generate biodiesel with maximum flexibility in terms of raw materials and minimal accumulation of waste in the process, that meets with current standards. The SOLBEN models are: AB-400, AB-1000, AB-3000, AB-5000 and AB-8000.
