= Mikel Martins =

Spanish footballer

Personal information
- Full name: Mikel Martins das Neves
- Date of birth: 28 May 1983 (age 43)
- Place of birth: San Sebastián, Spain
- Height: 1.77 m (5 ft 10 in)
- Position: Midfielder

Youth career
- 1998–1999: Antiguoko
- 1999–2002: Athletic Bilbao

Senior career*
Years	Team	Apps	(Gls)
2002–2003	Basconia	34	(4)
2003–2006	Bilbao Athletic	87	(3)
2006–2007	Espanyol B	20	(1)
2007–2008	Baza	36	(1)
2008–2009	Guijuelo	37	(3)
2009–2010	Benidorm	28	(0)
2010–2013	Mirandés	102	(4)
2013–2014	Cádiz	31	(0)
2014–2015	Hércules	22	(0)
2015–2018	Real Unión	78	(5)
2018–2019	Amorebieta	20	(0)
Total		495	(21)
- * Club domestic league appearances and goals

Mikel Martins das Neves (born 28 May 1983) is a Spanish former professional footballer who played as a defensive midfielder.

== Club career ==
A product of Athletic Bilbao's youth system, Martins was born in San Sebastián, Basque Country, and started his senior career with the club's farm and B teams. He spent nine of his first ten seasons as a professional in the Segunda División B, also representing RCD Espanyol B, CD Baza, CD Guijuelo, Benidorm CF and CD Mirandés, joining the latter in June 2010.

Martins started in 27 of his 35 appearances for Mirandés in 2011–12, as the Castile and León side reached Segunda División for the first time ever. He played his first match in the competition on 17 August 2012, coming on as a late substitute in a 0–1 home loss against SD Huesca.

On 21 July 2015, Martins signed with Real Unión from Hércules CF. He retired at the age of 36, after one year with SD Amorebieta also in the third tier and his native region.
