= Yeray Ortega =

Spanish footballer (born 1975)

Personal information
- Full name: Yeray Ortega Garda
- Date of birth: 17 June 1975 (age 50)
- Place of birth: Spain
- Height: 1.83 m (6 ft 0 in)
- Position: Striker

Senior career*
Years	Team	Apps	(Gls)
1998–2001	Universidad de Las Palmas CF	35	(4)
2001	SD Eibar	6	(0)
2002	RC Celta Fortuna	9	(0)
2002–2003	Universidad de Las Palmas CF	5	(1)
2003–2004	UD Pájara Playas de Jandía	28	(5)
2004–2006	Real Oviedo	43	(1)
2006–2008	UD Lanzarote	66	(11)
2008–2009	UD Villa de Santa Brígida	20	(4)
2009	SV Ried	10	(1)
2009–2011	UD Vecindario	48	(16)
2011	SC Rheindorf Altach	10	(3)
2011–2012	UD Vecindario	34	(13)
2012–2017	UD Villa de Santa Brígida		
- * Club domestic league appearances and goals

Yeray Ortega Garda (born 17 June 1975) is a Spanish former footballer.

== Early life ==
Ortega was born in 1975 in Spain. He is a native of the Canary Islands, Spain.

== Playing career ==
Ortega started his career with Spanish side Universidad de Las Palmas CF. In 2001, he signed for Spanish side SD Eibar. In 2002, he signed for Spanish side RC Celta Fortuna. After that, he returned to Spanish side Universidad de Las Palmas CF. In 2003, he signed for Spanish side UD Pájara Playas de Jandía. In 2004, he signed for Spanish side Real Oviedo. In 2006, he signed for Spanish side UD Lanzarote. In 2008, he signed for Spanish side UD Villa de Santa Brígida. In 2009, he signed for Austrian side SV Ried. After that, he signed for Spanish side UD Vecindario. In 2011, he signed for Austrian side SC Rheindorf Altach. After that, he signed for Spanish side UD Vecindario. He was regarded as one of the club's most important players. In 2012, he returned to Spanish side UD Villa de Santa Brígida.

== Post-playing career ==
After retiring from professional football, Ortega worked as a youth manager. He has also worked as a football agent.

== Personal life ==
He donated money to Real Oviedo to help the club avoid bankruptcy.
