= Pablo Infante =

Spanish footballer (born 1980)

Personal information
- Full name: Pablo Infante Muñoz
- Date of birth: 20 March 1980 (age 46)
- Place of birth: Burgos, Spain
- Height: 1.68 m (5 ft 6 in)
- Position: Winger

Youth career
- Burgos
- Vadillos
- Racing Lermeño

Senior career*
Years	Team	Apps	(Gls)
1999–2002	Racing Lermeño		
2002–2003	Río Vena		
2003–2005	Arandina	64	(29)
2005–2014	Mirandés	309	(126)
2014–2016	Ponferradina	49	(4)
Total		422	(159)
- * Club domestic league appearances and goals

Pablo Infante Muñoz (born 20 March 1980) is a Spanish former professional footballer who played as a winger

A late bloomer, he spent most of his professional career at Mirandés, making nearly 350 competitive appearances and amassing Segunda División totals of 55 matches and 11 goals for the club (adding 49 games and four goals in that tier with Ponferradina).

== Career ==
=== Early career ===
Born in Burgos, Castile and León, Infante played at youth level with local Real Burgos CF, Vadillos CF and Racing Lermeño. His first six years as a senior were spent in amateur football.

=== Mirandés ===
Infante made his professional debut in the 2005–06 season, with CD Mirandés in the Tercera División, which he helped to promote to Segunda División B in his fourth year. In 2011–12, his name became known in Spain after the Castile and León club's performances in that campaign's Copa del Rey, disposing of La Liga sides Villarreal CF and Racing de Santander, with the player scoring four of their six goals in those four matches, and eventually being crowned the competition's top scorer; in the domestic league, he netted 13 times in the regular season alone to help his team promote to Segunda División for the first time ever.

On 28 June 2012, the 32-year-old Infante renewed his contract with Mirandés for one further season. He played his first game in the second tier on 17 August, starting in a 0–1 home loss against SD Huesca.

Infante scored his professional goals on 1 September 2012, netting a brace in a 4–0 away victory over Xerez CD.

=== Ponferradina ===
On 13 July 2014, after a nine-year spell at the Estadio Municipal de Anduva, Infante signed a one-year deal with fellow second-division SD Ponferradina. He scored four times from 32 appearances in his debut campaign, adding seven assists for the seventh-placed team.

== Personal life ==
After numerous media interviews in Spain, it emerged that Infante spent years refusing offers from clubs in higher divisions due to his work as director of a bank branch, located 50 kilometers from Mirandés' facilities.

He was a graduate in business administration from the University of Burgos, and spent the vast majority of his career in teams in the Province of Burgos.
