= Adrian Chafer =

Spanish singer, songwriter and producer

- Also known as: Adrian Chafer
- Born: Joan Adria Chafer Runkle; July 4, 1991 (age 35); Madrid, Spain
- Origin: Madrid, Spain
- Genres: Reggae, Pop, electronic, R&B, dance, independent music
- Occupations: Singer, dancer
- Instrument: Vocals
- Years active: 2010–present
- Label: Warner Music
- Website: http://www.AdrianChafer.com

Adrian Chafer (born July 4, 1991, in Madrid, Spain), is a Spanish singer, songwriter and producer.

== Career ==
Chafer started uploading covers to YouTube in 2010. In 2014 he participated in the contest "La Voz España", finishing as a finalist. That same year, he recorded his first album, set to be released in 2015.

Before releasing his first album, he was also a collaborator of Radio Libertad FM of Madrid.

Chafer's first album was called "Lazy" and the first single that released was titled the same. Lazy reached the top 10 in the lists of Spotify at national level. The album was released in 2015.

He has been nominated for "disc of the year" at the Onda Awards in Spain and "Revalación Artist" at the EDM RADIO Awards.

== Featured singles ==
Year	Title	Chart positions		
Year	Title	SPA	Arg	Mex
2015	Lazy	4	17	23
2015	Summer Delight	7	32	13
2016	Steal a kiss	5	12	9

== Links ==
- Adrian Chafer interview at SantoGrial (2015) http://www.santogrialproducciones.es/web/index.php?menu=3&pagina=contacto&item=332
- ADRIÁN CHAFER: "in" LAZY "you will find many Truths about everythings of feelings i have had " https://thecultureta.wordpress.com/2015/05/25/adrian-chafer-en-lazy-encontrareis-muchas-verdades-sobre-todo-de-sentimientos-que-he-tenido/
- Adrian Chafer. The most Spanish and international pop of 2015. http://noeliabaldrich.blogspot.com.es/2015/03/chaferlazy-es-un-disco-muy-autentico-y.html
- The versatile Adrian Chafer releases the first album. http://www.diariocritico.com/noticia/479973/musica/el-polifacetico-adrian-chafer-nos-subyuga-con-lazy-su-primer-disco-y-la-banda-sonora-de-su-vida.html
- Adrian Chafer: "I would like to work with alejandro sanz, he is my idol". https://web.archive.org/web/20170423154713/http://www.lhmagazin.com/lh-en-el-heroe-entrevista-a-adrian-chafer/
- Adrian Chafer: "If you do not dedicate to music I would not dedicate myself to anything" http://www.radiostarterrassa.com/news.php?item.2849
- Adrian Chafer: "I sing in English because that's how I feel." http://www.esmiradio.es/adrian-chafer-el-jueves-26-de-marzo-de-2015-en-esmiradio-es/
- Adrian Chafer versiona "Together" with Corina Randazzo in the video clip. http://cadenaser.com/emisora/2015/05/21/radio_murcia/1432210260_611621.html
- Adrian Chafer winner of Premios Ondas 2015 presents "Together".http://www.rtve.es/alacarta/videos/para-todos-la-2/para-todos-2-actuacion-adrian-chafer-together/3083795/

== Official Links ==
- Official Website
