= CD Mirandés =

Spanish football team

Mirandés
- Full name: Club Deportivo Mirandés, S.A.D.
- Nickname: Los Rojillos (The Reds) Jabatos (Wild Boars)
- Founded: 3 May 1927; 99 years ago
- Stadium: Estadio Municipal de Anduva
- Capacity: 5,759
- President: Alfredo de Miguel Crespo
- Head coach: Aday Benítez
- League: Primera Federación – Group 1
- 2025–26: Segunda División, 19th of 22 (relegated)
- Website: cdmirandes.com
Home colours	Away colours

Club Deportivo Mirandés, S.A.D. is a Spanish football team based in Miranda de Ebro, Province of Burgos, in the autonomous community of Castile and León. Founded on 3 May 1927, the club competes in the Primera Federación and holds its home matches at Estadio Municipal de Anduva. They have never played in La Liga.

== History ==
Mirandés' origins can be traced to the beginnings of the 20th century, with clubs such as El Deportivo Mirandés (1917), Sporting Club Mirandés (1919), Deportivo SC (1919), and Miranda Unión Club (1922) all being its predecessors. Club Deportivo was founded as such on 3 May 1927, playing its first game on 4 June in the Saint John of the Mountain Festival, against Arabarra, winning 1–0 courtesy of a Fidel Angulo goal; the team's first president was Arturo García del Río, with the organization's initial capital consisting of 666 shares of 15 pesetas each.

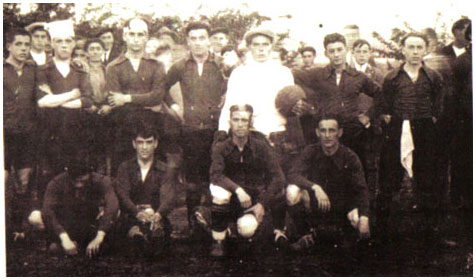
Mirandés' first squad

From 1944 to 1977, Mirandés competed in Tercera División, with the exception of three seasons spent in the regional leagues. The club's debut in Tercera división took place on 24 September 1944, with a 2–2 draw against Vasconia from San Sebastián.

One of the best Mirandés campaigns during these years was in 1957–58 season, when under the presidency of Andrés Espallargas and with Juan Malón as a coach, the club finished in 2nd in Tercera división.

In 1977–78, Mirandés moved to the newly created Segunda División B, lasting five years, twice unsuccessful in the promotion playoffs. On 28 December 1977, the team faced Mario Kempes and Valencia at home in the Copa del Rey, losing 2–4; future Real Madrid player and La Liga manager Miguel Ángel Portugal played with the team during this decade.

In 1986, Mirandés was one of the founders of the La Rioja Football Federation. Three years later, the club won its first major trophy, conquering the fourth level championship under 23-year-old manager Juan Manuel Lillo. The team went on to fluctuate between divisions three and four in the following years, again experiencing the odd visit to the regional levels (two seasons).

=== 21st century ===
Mirandés returned to the third division in the 2008–09 campaign, following two seasons in which the club finished the regular season top of the table only to fall short in the playoffs. In the decisive match, the team won against Jerez Industrial 3–2 at home (4–2 on aggregate).

Chart of CD Mirandés league performance 1929–present

In 2011–12, Mirandés started the league with a run of 833 minutes without conceding a goal, eventually losing its first match in the 18th game. In the season's domestic cup, the club reached the semi-finals – becoming the first third-tier team to make it to that stage since Figueres in the 2001–02 edition – after disposing of top level sides Villarreal, Racing Santander, and Espanyol, falling to Athletic Bilbao. At the end of that season, the team was promoted to Segunda División for the first time ever, after defeating Atlético Baleares in the playoffs. In the 2012–13 season, they managed to remain in Segunda División by finishing 15th out of 22 teams. There was another credible cup run in 2015–16, Mirandés eliminating top-division opponents Málaga and Deportivo La Coruña before losing to Sevilla in the quarter-finals.

At the end of the 2016–17 season, Mirandés was relegated after spending five years in the second division. On 28 March 2019, Mirandés won that season's Copa Federación after beating Cornellà in the final. In the 2018–19 season, the club finished 3rd in Segunda División B, Group 2 and again was promoted to the Segunda División in the playoffs, coincidentally overcoming Atlético Baleares once more.

On 5 February 2020, Mirandés beat Villarreal 4–2 to reach the semi-finals of the 2019–20 Copa del Rey, also defeating two other La Liga teams Celta Vigo and Sevilla; their run was ended by eventual winners Real Sociedad. The club subsequently became known for their signing policy, consisting mainly of young players on loan.

Mirandés finished fourth in the 2024–25 season and reached the promotion playoff final against Real Oviedo. They secured a 1–0 victory at home but missed out on promotion to La Liga after a 3–1 defeat away in the second leg, which went into extra time. On the next season, Mirandés was relegated after spending seven years in the second division.

== Season to season ==
Season	Tier	Division	Place	Copa del Rey
1944–45	3	3ª	7th	
1945–46	3	3ª	6th	
1946–47	3	3ª	8th	
1947–48	3	3ª	10th	Second round
1948–49	3	3ª	8th	Second round
1949–50	3	3ª	13th	
1950–51	3	3ª	6th	
1951–52	3	3ª	7th	
1952–53	3	3ª	3rd	
1953–54	3	3ª	18th	
1954–55	3	3ª	4th	
1955–56	3	3ª	11th	
1956–57	3	3ª	15th	
1957–58	3	3ª	2nd	
1958–59	3	3ª	5th	
1959–60	3	3ª	6th	
1960–61	3	3ª	10th	
1961–62	3	3ª	6th	
1962–63	3	3ª	5th	
1963–64	3	3ª	6th	

Season	Tier	Division	Place	Copa del Rey
1964–65	3	3ª	10th	
1965–66	3	3ª	15th	
1966–67	4	1ª Reg.	1st	
1967–68	3	3ª	12th	
1968–69	4	1ª Reg.	6th	
1969–70	4	1ª Reg.	1st	
1970–71	3	3ª	9th	Third round
1971–72	3	3ª	10th	Second round
1972–73	3	3ª	16th	First round
1973–74	3	3ª	15th	Second round
1974–75	3	3ª	5th	Third round
1975–76	3	3ª	8th	Third round
1976–77	3	3ª	6th	Second round
1977–78	3	2ª B	4th	Third round
1978–79	3	2ª B	3rd	
1979–80	3	2ª B	11th	Second round
1980–81	3	2ª B	9th	
1981–82	3	2ª B	18th	First round
1982–83	4	3ª	14th	
1983–84	4	3ª	10th	

Season	Tier	Division	Place	Copa del Rey
1984–85	4	3ª	13th	
1985–86	4	3ª	8th	
1986–87	4	3ª	3rd	
1987–88	3	2ª B	18th	First round
1988–89	4	3ª	1st	Second round
1989–90	3	2ª B	14th	
1990–91	3	2ª B	17th	Third round
1991–92	4	3ª	5th	Third round
1992–93	4	3ª	3rd	Second round
1993–94	4	3ª	6th	
1994–95	4	3ª	18th	
1995–96	5	Reg. Pref.	3rd	
1996–97	5	Reg. Pref.	1st	
1997–98	4	3ª	10th	
1998–99	4	3ª	16th	
1999–2000	4	3ª	3rd	
2000–01	4	3ª	2nd	
2001–02	4	3ª	6th	
2002–03	4	3ª	1st	
2003–04	3	2ª B	3rd	Round of 64

Season	Tier	Division	Place	Copa del Rey
2004–05	3	2ª B	16th	Round of 16
2005–06	4	3ª	2nd	
2006–07	4	3ª	1st	
2007–08	4	3ª	1st	First round
2008–09	4	3ª	2nd	First round
2009–10	3	2ª B	13th	
2010–11	3	2ª B	2nd	
2011–12	3	2ª B	1st	Semi-finals
2012–13	2	2ª	15th	Third round
2013–14	2	2ª	19th	Second round
2014–15	2	2ª	8th	Third round
2015–16	2	2ª	15th	Quarter-finals
2016–17	2	2ª	22nd	Second round
2017–18	3	2ª B	1st	Second round
2018–19	3	2ª B	3rd	First round
2019–20	2	2ª	11th	Semi-finals
2020–21	2	2ª	10th	First round
2021–22	2	2ª	14th	Round of 32
2022–23	2	2ª	16th	Second round
2023–24	2	2ª	18th	Second round

Season	Tier	Division	Place	Copa del Rey
2024–25	2	2ª	4th	First round
2025–26	2	2ª	19th	Second round
2026–27	3	1ª Fed.		

- 12 seasons in Segunda División
- 1 seasons in Primera Federación
- 15 seasons in Segunda División B
- 50 seasons in Tercera División

== Current squad ==
As of 21 October 2026

Note: Flags indicate national team as defined under FIFA eligibility rules; some limited exceptions apply. Players may hold more than one non-FIFA nationality.

No.	Pos.	Nation	Player
1	GK	ESP	Jesús Ruiz
3	DF	ESP	Hodei Arrillaga (on loan from Eibar)
4	DF	ESP	Carlos Navarro (on loan from Las Palmas)
5	DF	ESP	Peru Rodríguez
6	MF	ESP	Adrián Verde
7	MF	ESP	David de la Iglesia
8	MF	ESP	Raúl Martínez
9	FW	ESP	Iker Unzueta
10	MF	ESP	Nico Espinosa
11	FW	ESP	Aitor Uzkudun (on loan from Andorra)
12	MF	ESP	Jorge González
13	GK	ESP	Edgar Badia
14	MF	ESP	Miguel Auría (on loan from Osasuna)

No.	Pos.	Nation	Player
15	DF	ESP	Iker Pedernales
16	MF	ESP	Markel Lozano
17	DF	ESP	Pablo Pérez
18	FW	ESP	Rodri Val
19	MF	BRA	Riki de Morais (on loan from Valladolid)
20	MF	AND	Aron Rodrigo (on loan from Andorra)
21	DF	ESP	Aritz Arambarri
22	DF	ESP	Martín Aguirregabiria
23	MF	ESP	Josué Dorrio
24	DF	ESP	Joaquín Fernández
26	FW	ESP	Julen Martínez
31	GK	ESP	Adrián Zango

=== Reserve team ===
Note: Flags indicate national team as defined under FIFA eligibility rules; some limited exceptions apply. Players may hold more than one non-FIFA nationality.

No.	Pos.	Nation	Player

=== Out on loan ===
Note: Flags indicate national team as defined under FIFA eligibility rules; some limited exceptions apply. Players may hold more than one non-FIFA nationality.

No.	Pos.	Nation	Player

== Current technical staff ==
Position	Staff
Head coach	(Spain) Aday Benítez
Assistant coach	TBA
Goalkeeper coach	(Spain) David Fernández
Fitness coach	(Spain) Diego Isla
Team delegate	(Spain) Unax Pucho
Equipment manager	(Spain) Javier Cañibano (Spain) Carlos
Doctor	(Spain) Arancha Barruso
Physiotherapist	(Spain) Pablo García (Spain) David Hurtado (Spain) Marco Varas
Nutricionist	(Spain) Nagore Ortega

Last updated: 29 April 2026
Source: CD Mirandés (in Spanish)

== Honours ==
- Castilla y León Cup: 2011, 2012
- Copa Federación de España: 2018–19

== Stadium ==
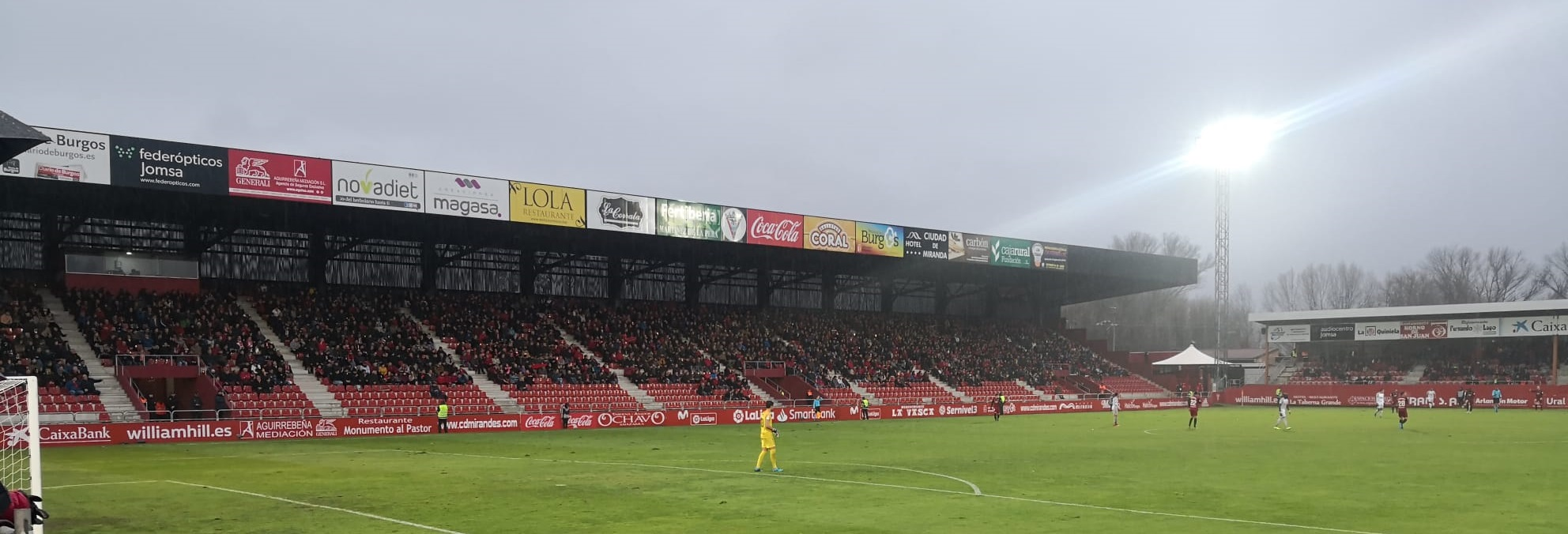
General stand of Anduva

Mirandés plays home games at Estadio Municipal de Anduva. Owned by the Miranda de Ebro Town Hall, it was inaugurated on 22 January 1950, and has a capacity of 5,759 spectators (mostly seated), with a dimension of 105×68 meters of natural grass.

Additionally, it also held other sporting events, most notably the under-21 match between Spain and Poland in 2006 (0–1).

Prior to this stadium, the club played its matches in other settings. During its first year of life, it played at Campo de Kronne, which was located between the Carretera de Logroño and the Avenida República Argentina. The following year the team moved to another ground and, on 26 May 1928, the first game at Campo de La Estación took place, against Club Ciclista de San Sebastián, with the team remaining there until 1950.

== Famous players ==
Note: this list includes players that have appeared in at least 100 league games and/or have reached international status.

- (Spain) Iván Agustín
- (Spain) Alain Arroyo
- (Spain) César Caneda
- (Spain) Iñaki Garmendia
- (Spain) Pablo Infante
- (Spain) Mikel Iribas
- (Slovakia) Erik Jirka
- (Spain) Gorka Kijera
- (Spain) Mikel Martins
- (Spain) Aritz Mújika
- (Equatorial Guinea) Randy
- (Morocco) Oussama Souaidy

See Category:CD Mirandés footballers

== Famous coaches ==
- (Spain) Juan Manuel Lillo (1988–89), (1990–91)
- (Spain) José Ignacio Soler (2004)
- (Spain) José María García de Andoin (2005)
- (Spain) Ismael Urtubi (2005–06)
- (Spain) Miguel Ángel Sola (2006–08)
- (Spain) Julio Bañuelos (2008–10)
- (Spain) Carlos Pouso (2010–13)
- (Spain) Gonzalo Arconada (2013)
- (Spain) Carlos Terrazas (2013–2016)
- (Spain) Andoni Iraola (2019–2020)

== See also ==
- CD Mirandés B, reserve team.
