= Chaffer =

Chaffer is a surname. Notable people with the surname include:

- Lucy Chaffer (born 1983), Australian skeleton racer
- Ross Chaffer (born 1972), Australian sprint canoeist
- Norman Chaffer (1899–1992), Australian businessman
- Don and Lori Chaffer, founding members of the band Waterdeep

== See also ==
- Haffer
