= Iván Agustín =

Spanish footballer

Personal information
- Full name: Roberto Iván Agustín Suárez
- Date of birth: 16 April 1979 (age 47)
- Place of birth: Logroño, Spain
- Height: 1.78 m (5 ft 10 in)
- Position: Midfielder

Youth career
- 1995–1998: Berceo

Senior career*
Years	Team	Apps	(Gls)
1998–1999	Alavés B		
1999–2000	Agoncillo		
2000–2001	Mirandés		
2001–2002	Amurrio	12	(1)
2002–2004	Mirandés	35	(3)
2004–2005	Algeciras	34	(1)
2005–2006	Terrassa	31	(2)
2006–2014	Mirandés	248	(53)
Total		360	(60)
- * Club domestic league appearances and goals

Roberto Iván Agustín Suárez (born 16 April 1979) is a Spanish retired footballer who played mainly as a midfielder.

He spent most of his career with Mirandés (three spells), competing with the club in all major levels but La Liga and appearing in more than 300 competitive matches.

== Club career ==
Born in Logroño, La Rioja, Agustín began his senior career with CD Mirandés, moving in 2001 to Segunda División B side Amurrio Club. In the following summer he returned to his previous club, achieving promotion to that level in his first season.

In 2004, Agustín joined Algeciras CF also in division three, continuing to play in that tier in 2005–06, with Terrassa FC. He returned to Mirandés for a third stint afterwards, contributing 14 games in the 2011–12 campaign (1,020 minutes overall) as his team achieved promotion in the playoffs, reaching Segunda División for the first time in their history.

Agustín made his debut in the latter competition on 6 October 2012 – at the age of 33 years and five months – starting in a 1–2 home loss against Elche CF. He scored his first professional goal on 1 December 2013, but in a 3–1 defeat at CE Sabadell FC.

On 11 August 2014, aged 35, Agustín announced his retirement, being immediately appointed his last club's fitness coach.
