= Ekhi Senar =

Spanish footballer

Ekhi
- Ekhi in 2017

Personal information
- Full name: Ekhi Senar Rekondo
- Date of birth: 26 April 1990 (age 36)
- Place of birth: Barañáin, Spain
- Height: 1.80 m (5 ft 11 in)
- Position: Centre-back

Youth career
- 2006–2008: Osasuna

Senior career*
Years	Team	Apps	(Gls)
2008–2014	Osasuna B	119	(12)
2011–2012	→ Huesca (loan)	2	(0)
2012	→ Real Unión (loan)	16	(0)
2014–2016	Lleida Esportiu	67	(4)
2016–2022	Real Unión	179	(7)
2022–2023	Alfaro	33	(3)
2023–2024	Calahorra	21	(1)
2024–2025	Mutilvera	16	(1)
- * Club domestic league appearances and goals as of 16 April 2025

Ekhi Senar Rekondo (born 26 April 1990), known simply as Ekhi, is a Spanish professional footballer who plays as a central defender.
