= Carlos Carrasco (footballer) =

Spanish footballer (born 1993)

Personal information
- Full name: Carlos Carrasco Rodríguez
- Date of birth: 14 February 1993 (age 33)
- Place of birth: Alicante, Spain
- Height: 1.76 m (5 ft 9 in)
- Position: Winger

Team information
- Current team: Rayo Ibense

Youth career
- –2012: Orihuela

Senior career*
Years	Team	Apps	(Gls)
2012–2013	Orihuela	20	(0)
2013	Dordrecht	3	(0)
2013–2014	Jove Español	11	(1)
2014–2015	Arroyo	25	(1)
2015–2016	Orihuela	33	(5)
2016–2017	Almoradí	21	(1)
2017–2018	Leiknir	13	(0)
2019	Alicante City		
2019–2022	Intercity	51	(7)
2024–	Rayo Ibense	9	(2)
- * Club domestic league appearances and goals as of 13:55, 23 May 2025 (UTC)

Carlos Carrasco Rodríguez (born 14 February 1993) is a Spanish footballer who plays as a winger for Rayo Ibense.

== Career ==
Carrasco started his senior career with Segunda División B side Orihuela before joining Eerste Divisie side Dordrecht in July 2013. After making three league appearances for Dordrecht, Carrasco returned to Spain to have spells with Jove Español, Arroyo, Orihuela and Almoradí. In February 2017, he joined 1. deild karla side Leiknir, making six league appearances for the side in the 2017 season. After Leiknir were relegated, he remained with the side for the 2018 season in 2. deild karla, playing seven more times in the league. On 21 March 2019, Carrasco joined Segunda Regional de la Comunidad Valenciana side Alicante City.
