= Viivi Avellan =

Finnish sports journalist (born 1977)

Viivi Elina Avellan (born 3 June 1977) is a Finnish journalist and television hosting entrepreneur (Awell Entertainment Oy). She used to work as a sports news hostess for television channel Nelonen. Avellan was the hostess for entertainment news on MTV3 television channel from 2005 to 2006. She worked as an editor-in-chief for the Finnish golf magazine Fore from 2013 to 2016.

In 2006, Avellan published the book Sinkkunaisen käsikirja ("Handbook for single women", ISBN 951-31-3727-9). In 2012, her company published the ice hockey-themed children's book Leijona on kuningas with co-operation of the Finnish Ice Hockey Association.

From 2009 to 2012, Avellan lived in Switzerland, where she ran an art gallery in Zürich. Since 2016, Avellan has lived in Singapore with her husband (married in 2013) and their two sons. Since 2023, she has also lived in Los Angeles. Avellan has founded several companies in Singapore. She worked as a Country Manager at Innovation Home Singapore.

In the early 2020s, Avellan founded with her business partner a consulting company to Los Angeles and her team helps Nordic companies to enter to the U.S. market.
