= Daniel Gómez (water polo) =

Mexican water polo player (1948–2022)

Personal information
- Born: 28 February 1948; Mexico City, Mexico
- Died: 20 February 2022 (aged 73); Mexico City, Mexico

Sport
- Sport: Water polo

Daniel Gómez (28 February 1948 – 20 February 2022) was a Mexican water polo player. He competed at the 1968 Summer Olympics, the 1972 Summer Olympics and the 1976 Summer Olympics. Gómez died in Mexico City on 20 February 2022, at the age of 73.
