= Alberto Cobo =

Spanish ex-footballer

Manuel Aberto Cobo
Personal information
- Full name: Manuel Alberto Cobo Almagro
- Date of birth: 21 June 1984 (age 42)
- Place of birth: Jaén, Spain
- Height: 1.75 m (5 ft 9 in)
- Position: Winger

Youth career
- Real Madrid

Senior career*
Years	Team	Apps	(Gls)
2003–2004	Elche B		
2004–2005	Jaén B		
2005–2008	Mengíbar		
2008–2011	Mancha Real	80	(14)
2011–2014	Real Jaén	48	(4)
- * Club domestic league appearances and goals

Manuel Alberto Cobo Almagro (born 21 June 1984) is a Spanish former footballer who played as a winger.

== Club career ==
Born in Jaén, Andalusia, Cobo was an unsuccessful youth graduate at Real Madrid, and played amateur football until the age of 27. In July 2011 he signed with Real Jaén in Segunda División B, after having represented the club's reserves seven years before.

Cobo achieved promotion to Segunda División at the end of the 2012–13 season, but played sparingly due to an achilles tendon injury. On 17 June 2013, however, he renewed his link with the club.

On 6 October 2013, at already 29, Cobo made his professional debut, playing the last six minutes in a 3–2 home win over Real Murcia.
