= Daniel Alberto Chafer =

Argentine footballer

Personal information
- Full name: Daniel Alberto Chafer
- Date of birth: 19 September 1981 (age 45)
- Place of birth: Santa Fe, Argentina
- Position: Forward

Team information
- Current team: Chieti

Senior career*
Years	Team	Apps	(Gls)
2003–2004	Lanciano	25	(1)
2004–2006	Gubbio	69	(11)
2006–2007	Melfi	19	(2)
2007–2008	Isola Liri	29	(7)
2008–2009	Cynthia	11	(5)
2010–	Chieti	0	(0)
- * Club domestic league appearances and goals as of 28 July 2011

Daniel Alberto Chafer (born 19 September 1981) is an Argentine footballer who plays for Chieti.

== Biography ==
Chafer started his career at Italy for Castel Madama. In July 2003, he was signed by Chievo and farmed him to Lanciano in a co-ownership deal. In the next season he left for Gubbio of Serie C2 and in 2006 moved to Gubbio of same division but in different group. Since 2007, he played at Serie D, the top division of regional league and non-professional football.

In December 2009 he joined Chieti.
