= Carlos Tomás =

Spanish footballer

Personal information
- Full name: Carlos Tomás Ferrer
- Date of birth: 18 May 1988 (age 38)
- Place of birth: Ibiza, Spain
- Height: 1.83 m (6 ft 0 in)
- Position: Centre back

Youth career
- 2002–2004: Penya Blanc Blava
- 2004–2007: Villarreal

Senior career*
Years	Team	Apps	(Gls)
2007–2012	Villarreal B	49	(1)
2007–2009	→ Onda (loan)	74	(0)
2011–2012	Villarreal	1	(0)
2012	Ponferradina	6	(0)
2012–2014	Levante B	12	(0)
2014–2015	Arroyo	14	(0)
2015–2016	Peña Deportiva	33	(3)
2016–2017	Ibiza	15	(1)
Total		204	(5)
- * Club domestic league appearances and goals

Carlos Tomás Ferrer (born 18 May 1988) is a Spanish former footballer who played as a central defender.

In a career that ended through injury at age 29, he made one La Liga appearance for Villarreal, and 49 in Segunda División for their reserves.

== Football career ==
Born in Ibiza Town, Balearic Islands, Tomás began playing football at local Penya Blanc i Blava d'Eivissa before joining Villarreal CF. He played for three seasons in the club's reserve team in Segunda División, scoring once to conclude a 4–0 home win over Córdoba CF on 6 February 2010.

Tomás made his only first-team and La Liga appearance on 21 May 2011 as the fourth-placed Yellow Submarine lost 1–0 at CA Osasuna on the last day of the season; he became the fifth man from Ibiza to play in Spain's top flight. His only other involvement was on 2 November, when he was an unused substitute in a 3–0 home loss to Manchester City in the UEFA Champions League group stage.

Tomás left Villarreal in January 2012, becoming Segunda División B club SD Ponferradina's first signing of the transfer window. In August, with his team having been promoted via the playoffs, he stayed in the third tier at Levante UD B.

When his two-year stay with the Granotes ended in relegation to the Tercera División in 2014, Tomás moved on to Arroyo CP. The following July, he signed a one-year deal at SCR Peña Deportiva on his home island.

In December 2017, Tomás announced his retirement due to a string of injuries while playing in the fourth division for UD Ibiza. He immediately found a new job at an airport.
