= Nico Cháfer =

Spanish footballer

Personal information
- Full name: Nicolás Cháfer García
- Date of birth: 11 February 1991 (age 35)
- Place of birth: Gandia, Spain
- Height: 1.75 m (5 ft 9 in)
- Position: Attacking midfielder

Team information
- Current team: L'Olleria CF

Youth career
- Benirredrá
- Villarreal

Senior career*
Years	Team	Apps	(Gls)
2009–2011	Villarreal C	34	(2)
2010–2013	Villarreal B	26	(0)
2012	→ Melilla (loan)	9	(2)
2012–2013	→ Leganés (loan)	20	(0)
2013–2015	Elche B	49	(4)
2015	Alcoyano	11	(1)
2015–2016	San Roque	34	(3)
2016–2017	Alzira	8	(0)
2017	Eldense	10	(0)
2017–2018	Guadalajara	25	(9)
2018–2019	Villarrubia	22	(2)
2019	Castellonense		
2019–2020	Olímpic Xàtiva	26	(4)
2020–2021	Castellonense		
2021–2022	Gandía		
2022–	L'Olleria CF		
- * Club domestic league appearances and goals as of 1 March 2020

Nicolás "Nico" Cháfer García (born 11 February 1991), sometimes known as just Nico, is a Spanish footballer who plays for L'Olleria CF as an attacking midfielder.
