= Diego Reyes (footballer, born 1979) =

Spanish footballer

Personal information
- Full name: Diego Reyes Muñoz
- Date of birth: 21 July 1979 (age 47)
- Place of birth: Chiclana, Spain
- Height: 1.74 m (5 ft 8 1/2 in)
- Position: Left back

Youth career
- Chiclana
- 1997–1998: Betis

Senior career*
Years	Team	Apps	(Gls)
1998–2003	Betis B	129	(19)
1998–1999	→ San Fernando (loan)		
2003–2005	Ceuta	67	(5)
2005–2006	Gimnàstic	31	(0)
2006–2008	Córdoba	65	(1)
2008–2010	Castellón	46	(0)
2010–2011	Cádiz	15	(1)
2011–2012	Salamanca	25	(0)
2012–2014	Morell	43	(4)
Total		421	(30)
- * Club domestic league appearances and goals

Diego Reyes Muñoz (born 21 July 1979 in Chiclana de la Frontera, Cádiz) is a Spanish former professional footballer who played as a left back.
