= Dani Gómez (footballer, born 1992) =

Spanish footballer

Personal information
- Full name: Daniel Gómez López
- Date of birth: 15 June 1992 (age 34)
- Place of birth: La Unión, Spain
- Height: 1.82 m (6 ft 0 in)
- Position: Forward

Team information
- Current team: Olímpic Xàtiva

Youth career
- Cartagena

Senior career*
Years	Team	Apps	(Gls)
2010–2011	Cartagena-La Unión	20	(6)
2011–2012	Cartagena	2	(0)
2011–2012	→ Orihuela (loan)	31	(6)
2012–2013	Getafe B	6	(0)
2013	Zaragoza B	8	(1)
2013–2014	Coruxo	16	(0)
2014–	Olímpic Xàtiva	46	(4)
- * Club domestic league appearances and goals as of 12 April 2015

Daniel 'Dani' Gómez López (born 15 June 1992 in La Unión, Murcia) is a Spanish footballer who, since 2014, plays for CD Olímpic de Xàtiva as a forward.

== Football career ==
A product of local FC Cartagena's youth system, Gómez made senior debuts with the farm team in the 2010–11 season, in Tercera División. On 15 January 2011 he appeared in his first game as a professional, playing the last 17 minutes in a 1–3 away loss against Rayo Vallecano in the Segunda División championship.

On 5 August 2011 López was loaned to Orihuela CF, in Segunda División B. The following summer he rescinded his contract with Cartagena, and signed with Getafe CF B; six months later, however, after being rarely played by the Madrid outskirts club, he moved to another reserve team, Real Zaragoza B.

On 13 July 2013 Gómez signed with Coruxo FC, also in the third level. In January of the following year he rescinded his link, and moved to fellow league side CD Olímpic de Xàtiva.
