= Omar Monterde =

Spanish footballer

Personal information
- Full name: Omar Monterde Villaescusa
- Date of birth: 24 March 1989 (age 37)
- Place of birth: Valencia, Spain
- Height: 1.70 m (5 ft 7 in)
- Position: Winger

Youth career
- Levante

Senior career*
Years	Team	Apps	(Gls)
2008–2010	Levante B	65	(3)
2009	Levante	2	(0)
2010	Puçol		
2010–2011	Mislata	26	(7)
2011	Acero	0	(0)
2011–2012	Alcoyano	8	(0)
2012	Valencia B	6	(0)
2012–2013	Melilla	10	(0)
2013–2014	Acero	?	(2)
2014–2015	Castellón	40	(8)
2015–2016	Legionovia Legionowo	18	(6)
2016–2017	Bytovia Bytów	31	(2)
2018	Lincoln Red Imps	13	(4)
2018–2019	GKS Tychy	24	(3)
2019–2020	Olimpia Grudziądz	11	(3)
2020	GKS Tychy	2	(0)
2020–2021	Zamora	2	(0)
2021	Grama	13	(1)
2021–2022	Prat	4	(0)
2022	Grama	14	(1)
2022–2023	San Antonio de Benageber	13	(2)
2023	Gandía	8	(1)
2023–2024	Rayo Llíria	2	(0)
2024–2025	Recambios Colón	8	(0)
- * Club domestic league appearances and goals as of 24 March 2024

Omar Monterde Villaescusa (born 24 March 1989) is a Spanish footballer who plays as a left winger. He has played in the Segunda División for Alcoyano and in the Polish I liga for Bytovia Bytów, GKS Tychy and Olimpia Grudziądz.

== Club career ==
On 3 August 2020, he joined Zamora.
