= Héctor Ladero =

Spanish footballer and manager

Personal information
- Full name: Héctor Ladero Rivas
- Date of birth: 13 May 1989 (age 37)
- Place of birth: Salamanca, Spain
- Height: 1.82 m (6 ft 0 in)
- Position: Centre back

Team information
- Current team: Lenoir–Rhyne Bears (assistant)

Youth career
- Salamanca
- Santa Marta

Senior career*
Years	Team	Apps	(Gls)
2007–2008	Santa Marta	37	(3)
2008–2010	Numancia B	71	(2)
2010–2012	Numancia	0	(0)
2010–2011	→ Real Unión (loan)	33	(5)
2012	Celta B	13	(0)
2012–2013	Salamanca	15	(0)
2014–2016	Myrtle Beach Mutiny		
Total		168	(10)

Managerial career
- 2016–: Lenoir–Rhyne Bears (assistant)
- * Club domestic league appearances and goals

Héctor Ladero Rivas (born 13 May 1989 in Salamanca, Castile and León) is a Spanish retired footballer who played as a central defender, and is the assistant manager of Lenoir–Rhyne Bears.
