= Enrique Avellán Ferrés =

Ecuadorian novelist and playwright

Enrique Avellán Ferrés (December 11, 1904 in Guayaquil – 1984 in Quito) was an Ecuadorian novelist and playwright.

He is the author of the novel La enorme pasión (Enormous Passion), the three-act play Como los árboles (1927; Like the Trees), and the musical fantasy La rebelion del museo (1969; Rebellion in the Museum).

He studied at the University of Guayaquil where he earned a degree in social and political sciences.

== Awards ==
Enrique Avellán Ferrés received multiple literary prizes.

In 1927 Avellán Ferrés, Hugo Mayo, and María Luisa Lecaro won the Savia Magazine Poetry Contest in Guayaquil.

== Works ==
- La enorme pasión (Enormous Passion)
- Como los árboles (1927; Like the Trees)
- El mismo caso (1938; The Same Case)
- Sin caminos (1939; Without direction)
- Manos de criminal (1939; Criminal Hands)
- Clarita la negra (1966; Black Clarita)
- Tiempo y ausencia (1969; Time and Absence)
- Correntada (1969; River Current)
- La rebelion del museo (1969; Rebellion in the Museum)
- Teatro para niños (1973; Children's Theater)
- Tablero: cuentos (1941)
