= Uri Santos =

Spanish footballer

Personal information
- Full name: Oriol Santos Ferrés
- Date of birth: 29 October 1986 (age 40)
- Place of birth: Olot, Spain
- Height: 1.69 m (5 ft 7 in)
- Position: Forward

Youth career
- Olot

Senior career*
Years	Team	Apps	(Gls)
2005–2006	Olot		
2006	Peralada		
2006–2007	Figueres	14	(1)
2007–2008	Girona	19	(1)
2008–2010	Racing B	65	(10)
2009	Racing Santander	1	(0)
2010–2012	Llagostera	69	(13)
2012–2018	Olot	232	(47)
2018–2019	Girona B	27	(18)
2019–2020	Tona	10	(4)
2020–2024	Bosc de Tosca		
- * Club domestic league appearances and goals

Oriol 'Uri' Santos Ferrés (born 29 October 1986) is a Spanish former footballer who played as a forward.

== Club career ==
Born in Olot, Girona, Catalonia, Santos graduated from local UE Olot's youth system, but left in January 2006 to sign with amateurs CF Peralada. He first arrived in Segunda División B in that year after joining UE Figueres, and represented fellow league club Girona FC in the 2007–08 season, scoring just twice in 33 games for both teams combined.

In September 2008 Santos moved to Racing de Santander, being initially assigned to the reserves also in the third level. On 3 May 2009 he made his first-team – and La Liga – debut, playing the last nine minutes in the 0–2 home loss against UD Almería.

In the 2010 summer, free agent Santos signed with UE Llagostera in Tercera División. He achieved promotion at the first attempt, contributing with ten goals in 36 matches.

On 6 June 2012 Santos returned to his first club Olot, also in the fourth level.
