= CD San Roque de Lepe =

Association football club in Spain

San Roque de Lepe
- Full name: Club Deportivo San Roque de Lepe, SAD
- Nickname: Aurinegros
- Founded: 31 October 1956; 69 years ago
- Ground: Ciudad de Lepe, Lepe, Andalusia, Spain
- Capacity: 3,512
- Owners: David Lindfors; Oliver Cabrera
- President: Miguel Hernández de Mercado
- Head coach: Antonio Rueda
- League: Tercera Federación – Group 10
- 2025–26: Tercera Federación – Group 10, 13th of 18
Home colours	Away colours

Club Deportivo San Roque de Lepe, S.A.D. is a Spanish football team based in Lepe, in the autonomous community of Andalusia. Founded in 1956 it plays in Tercera Federación – Group 10, holding home games at Estadio Ciudad de Lepe, with a capacity of 3,512 seats.

== Season to season ==
Season	Tier	Division	Place	Copa del Rey
1957–58	5	2ª Reg.	1st	
1958–59	4	1ª Reg.	5th	
1959–60	4	1ª Reg.	6th	
1960–61	4	1ª Reg.	5th	
1961–62	4	1ª Reg.	4th	
1962–63	4	1ª Reg.	3rd	
1963–64	4	1ª Reg.	1st	
1964–65	4	1ª Reg.	3rd	
1965–66	4	1ª Reg.	2nd	
1966–67	3	3ª	16th	
1967–68	4	1ª Reg.	6th	
1968–69	4	Reg. Pref.	3rd	
1969–70	4	Reg. Pref.	12th	
1970–71	4	Reg. Pref.	15th	
1971–72	4	Reg. Pref.	18th	
1972–73	5	1ª Reg.	3rd	
1973–74	5	1ª Reg.	3rd	
1974–75	5	1ª Reg.	3rd	
1975–76	6	2ª Reg. A	1st	
1976–77	5	1ª Reg.	8th	

Season	Tier	Division	Place	Copa del Rey
1977–78	6	1ª Reg.	21st	
1978–79	7	2ª Reg. A	1st	
1979–80	6	1ª Reg.	15th	
1980–81	6	1ª Reg.	6th	
1981–82	6	1ª Reg.	4th	
1982–83	6	1ª Reg.	11th	
1983–84	6	1ª Reg.	2nd	
1984–85	5	Reg. Pref.	18th	
1985–86	6	1ª Reg.	2nd	
1986–87	5	Reg. Pref.	2nd	
1987–88	4	3ª	10th	
1988–89	4	3ª	7th	
1989–90	4	3ª	3rd	
1990–91	4	3ª	4th	Fourth round
1991–92	4	3ª	3rd	Second round
1992–93	3	2ª B	16th	First round
1993–94	3	2ª B	16th	Second round
1994–95	3	2ª B	18th	First round
1995–96	4	3ª	5th	
1996–97	4	3ª	12th	

Season	Tier	Division	Place	Copa del Rey
1997–98	4	3ª	3rd	
1998–99	4	3ª	18th	
1999–2000	5	Reg. Pref.	6th	
2000–01	5	Reg. Pref.	1st	
2001–02	4	3ª	19th	
2002–03	5	Reg. Pref.	4th	
2003–04	5	Reg. Pref.	1st	
2004–05	5	1ª And.	5th	
2005–06	5	1ª And.	6th	
2006–07	5	1ª And.	2nd	
2007–08	4	3ª	12th	
2008–09	4	3ª	1st	
2009–10	3	2ª B	8th	First round
2010–11	3	2ª B	5th	
2011–12	3	2ª B	6th	Round of 32
2012–13	3	2ª B	18th	First round
2013–14	4	3ª	2nd	
2014–15	3	2ª B	9th	First round
2015–16	3	2ª B	19th	
2016–17	4	3ª	5th	

Season	Tier	Division	Place	Copa del Rey
2017–18	4	3ª	11th	
2018–19	4	3ª	16th	
2019–20	4	3ª	11th	
2020–21	4	3ª	1st / 2nd	
2021–22	4	2ª RFEF	6th	First round
2022–23	4	2ª Fed.	7th	
2023–24	4	2ª Fed.	16th	First round
2024–25	5	3ª Fed.	9th	
2025–26	5	3ª Fed.	13th	
2026–27	5	3ª Fed.		

- 9 seasons in Segunda División B
- 3 seasons in Segunda Federación/Segunda División RFEF
- 19 seasons in Tercera División
- 3 seasons in Tercera Federación
