= List of Spanish football transfers summer 2009 =

This is a list of Spanish football transfers for the summer sale in the 2009–10 season of La Liga and Segunda División. Only moves from La Liga and Segunda División are listed.

The summer transfer window opened on 1 July 2009, although a few transfers took place prior to that date. The window closed at midnight on 31 August 2009. Players without a club could have joined one at any time, either during or in between transfer windows. Clubs below La Liga level could also have signed players on loan at any time. If need be, clubs could have signed a goalkeeper on an emergency loan, if all others were unavailable.

== Summer 2009 transfer window ==
Date	Name	Moving from	Moving to	Fee
2009-03-12	Ángel Dealbert	Castellón	Valencia	Free
2009-04-27	Jefferson Montero	Independiente J.T.	Villarreal	Free
2009-04-28	Jonás Gutiérrez	Mallorca	Newcastle United	€2.6m
2009-05-19	Fabio Cannavaro	Real Madrid	Juventus	Free
2009-05-22	Leo Franco	Atlético Madrid	Galatasaray	Free
2009-05-28	Roberto Juca	Partizan	Deportivo La Coruña	Free
2009-06-03	Alain Nef	Recreativo de Huelva	Udinese	Loan return
2009-06-03	Mané Ortiz	Almería	Getafe	€2.5m
2009-06-04	Joan Verdú	Deportivo La Coruña	Espanyol	Free
2009-06-05	Iñaki Goitia	Málaga	Real Betis	Free
2009-06-08	Antonio Barragán	Deportivo La Coruña	Real Valladolid	Free
2009-06-08	Álvaro Negredo	Almería	Real Madrid	€5m
2009-06-09	Kaká	Milan	Real Madrid	€65m
2009-06-09	Pablo Gallardo	Sevilla Atlético	Recreativo de Huelva	Free
2009-06-10	Diego Costa	Albacete Balompié	Atlético Madrid	Loan return
2009-06-11	Cristiano Ronaldo	Manchester United	Real Madrid	€94m
2009-06-11	Jorge Molina	Polideportivo Ejido	Elche CF	Free
2009-06-11	Juli	Polideportivo Ejido	Elche CF	Free
2009-06-11	Sergio Pelegrín	UD Salamanca	Rayo Vallecano	Free
2009-06-11	Néstor Susaeta	AD Alcorcón	Rayo Vallecano	Free
2009-06-12	Alberto Rivera	Real Betis	Sporting de Gijón	Free
2009-06-12	Xavi Torres	FC Barcelona Atlétic	Málaga CF	Free
2009-06-12	Iñigo Díaz de Cerio	Real Sociedad	Athletic Bilbao	Free
2009-06-12	Jérémy Mathieu	Toulouse FC	Valencia CF	Free
2009-06-12	Javier Calleja	Málaga CF	CA Osasuna	Free
2009-06-12	David Fuster	Elche CF	Villarreal CF	€0.4m
2009-06-12	Abraham González	FC Barcelona Atlétic	Cádiz CF	Free
2009-06-12	Joni López	FC Barcelona Atlétic	Sporting de Gijón	Loan return
2009-06-12	Goran Marić	FC Barcelona Atlétic	Celta de Vigo	Loan return
2009-06-13	Pablo Camacho	Caracas FC	RCD Espanyol	Loan
2009-06-13	Carlos Peña	Albacete Balompié	Recreativo de Huelva	Free
2009-06-13	Eugen Polanski	Getafe CF	FSV Mainz 05	Loan
2009-06-15	Jacobo Sanz	Getafe CF	Real Valladolid	Loan return
2009-06-16	Wellington Baroni	AA Iguaçu	RCD Espanyol	Free
2009-06-16	Wellington Baroni	RCD Espanyol	Panionios F.C.	Loan
2009-06-16	Alejandro Alfaro	CD Tenerife	Sevilla FC	Loan return
2009-06-16	Pedro Botelho	UD Salamanca	Arsenal	Loan return
2009-06-16	Kiko Casilla	RCD Espanyol	Cádiz CF	Re-Loan
2009-06-17	Alejandro Zamora	Real Betis B	UD Salamanca	Free
2009-06-17	Álvaro Silva	Xerez CD	Málaga CF	Loan return
2009-06-17	Jonathan Estrada	CD Los Millonarios	Real Sociedad	Loan
2009-06-17	Miguel Pallardó	Getafe CF	Levante UD	Re-Loan
2009-06-17	Fabián Vargas	Boca Juniors	UD Almería	Free
2009-06-17	Jorge Gonçalves	Racing de Santander	Vitória S.C.	Loan
2009-06-18	Biel Medina	SD Eibar	Gimnàstic de Tarragona	Free
2009-06-18	Jordi Gómez	RCD Espanyol	Wigan Athletic	€2m
2009-06-18	Ben Sahar	Chelsea	RCD Espanyol	€1m
2009-06-18	Nauzet Alemán	UD Las Palmas	Real Valladolid	Free
2009-06-19	Jaime Romero	Albacete Balompié	Udinese Calcio	€1.8m
2009-06-19	Edu Albácar	Deportivo Alavés	Rayo Vallecano	Free
2009-06-19	Pedro Ríos	Xerez CD	Getafe CF	Free
2009-06-20	Paco Peña	Real Murcia	Hércules CF	Free
2009-06-20	Carlos García	UD Almería	Real Betis	Loan
2009-06-20	Eliseu	Málaga CF	S.S. Lazio	€1m
2009-06-21	Cristian Bustos	UD Salamanca	Celta de Vigo	Free
2009-06-22	Bruno Saltor	UD Almería	Valencia CF	Free
2009-06-22	Pedro Sánchez	Alicante CF	Real Murcia	Free
2009-06-22	Sergio Fernández	Hércules CF	Real Murcia	Free
2009-06-22	Rubén Navarro	Hércules CF	Gimnàstic de Tarragona	Free
2009-06-22	Juan Pablo Colinas	CD Numancia	Sporting de Gijón	€0.5m
2009-06-22	Leandro Cabrera	Defensor Sporting	Atlético Madrid	€1.5m
2009-06-22	Roberto García	SD Huesca	Gimnàstic de Tarragona	Free
2009-06-23	Tiago Dutra	Grêmio	Villarreal CF	€1m
2009-06-23	Ersen Martin	Recreativo de Huelva	Gaziantepspor	Free
2009-06-23	Jordi Alba	Gimnàstic de Tarragona	Valencia CF	Loan return
2009-06-23	Shunsuke Nakamura	Celtic F.C.	RCD Espanyol	Free
2009-06-23	Xavier Margairaz	CA Osasuna	FC Zürich	€0.4m
2009-06-23	David Catalá	UD Salamanca	Celta de Vigo	Free
2009-06-23	Jorge Alonso	UD Salamanca	Hércules CF	Free
2009-06-23	Miguel Linares	CD Alcoyano	UD Salamanca	Free
2009-06-23	Aritz López Garai	CD Castellón	Celta de Vigo	Free
2009-06-23	Eduardo Navarro	SD Huesca	CD Numancia	Free
2009-06-24	Raúl Albiol	Valencia CF	Real Madrid	€15m
2009-06-24	Javier Oliva	CD Castellón	Villarreal CF	Free
2009-06-24	Gregory Arnolin	Vitória S.C.	Sporting de Gijón	Free
2009-06-25	Morgan De Sanctis	Sevilla FC	S.S.C. Napoli	€1.7m
2009-06-25	Daniel Giménez	Zamora CF	Rayo Vallecano	Free
2009-06-25	Juan Ramón Cabrero	CD Numancia	Hércules CF	Free
2009-06-25	Miguel de las Cuevas	Atlético Madrid	Sporting de Gijón	€0.3m
2009-06-25	Miguel Ángel Moyà	RCD Mallorca	Valencia CF	€6m
2009-06-26	Nihat Kahveci	Villarreal CF	Beşiktaş	€4.5m
2009-06-26	Patrick Mtiliga	NAC Breda	Málaga CF	Free
2009-06-26	Miguel Tena	Levante UD	Elche CF	Free
2009-06-26	Brayan Angulo	Leixões S.C.	Deportivo de La Coruña	Loan
2009-06-26	Perico	CD Castellón	UD Salamanca	Free
2009-06-26	Álex Cruz	UD Vecindario	Gimnàstic de Tarragona	Free
2009-06-26	Vicente Pérez	Granada CF	Gimnàstic de Tarragona	Free
2009-06-26	Diego León	Barnsley F.C.	UD Las Palmas	Free
2009-06-26	Javier Saviola	Real Madrid	S.L. Benfica	€5m
2009-06-27	Juan Arango	RCD Mallorca	Borussia Mönchengladbach	€3.3m
2009-06-27	Gustavo Munúa	Deportivo de La Coruña	Málaga CF	Free
2009-06-27	Matías Fernández	Villarreal CF	Sporting C.P.	€4.5m
2009-06-27	Javier Casas	Athletic Bilbao	FC Cartagena	Free
2009-06-28	Raúl Cámara	Sporting de Gijón	Recreativo de Huelva	Free
2009-06-29	Ángel Bernabé	Atlético Madrid	UD Salamanca	Free
2009-06-29	Iriney	UD Almería	Real Betis	Free
2009-06-29	Grégory Coupet	Atlético Madrid	Paris Saint-Germain	Free
2009-06-29	Manuel Arana	CD Castellón	Racing de Santander	Free
2009-06-29	Jordi Codina	Real Madrid	Getafe CF	Free
2009-06-30	Hernán Bernardello	Newell's Old Boys	UD Almería	€3m
2009-06-30	Ximo Enguix	Rayo Vallecano	CD Castellón	Free
2009-06-30	Stephen Sunday	Valencia CF	Real Betis	Loan
2009-06-30	Héctor Font	CA Osasuna	Real Valladolid	Free
2009-06-30	Aquivaldo Mosquera	Sevilla FC	Club América	€4.2m
2009-06-30	Roberto Souza	Celta de Vigo	C.S. Marítimo	Free
2009-07-01	Domingo Cisma	CD Numancia	UD Almería	Loan return
2009-07-01	David Rodríguez	Celta de Vigo	UD Almería	Loan return
2009-07-01	Natalio Poquet	Córdoba CF	UD Almería	Loan return
2009-07-01	Iban Zubiaurre	Elche CF	Athletic Bilbao	Loan return
2009-07-01	Iñaki Lafuente	Sporting de Gijón	Athletic Bilbao	Loan return
2009-07-01	Tiko	SD Eibar	Athletic Bilbao	Loan return
2009-07-01	José Manuel Jurado	RCD Mallorca	Atlético Madrid	Loan return
2009-07-01	Cléber Santana	RCD Mallorca	Atlético Madrid	Loan return
2009-07-01	Juan Valera	Racing de Santander	Atlético Madrid	Loan return
2009-07-01	José Antonio Reyes	S.L. Benfica	Atlético Madrid	Loan return
2009-07-01	Éver Banega	Atlético Madrid	Valencia CF	Loan return
2009-07-01	Henrique	Bayer 04 Leverkusen	FC Barcelona	Loan return
2009-07-01	Adrián López	Málaga CF	Deportivo de La Coruña	Loan return
2009-07-01	Omar Bravo	UANL Tigres	Deportivo de La Coruña	Loan return
2009-07-01	Aythami	Xerez CD	Deportivo de La Coruña	Loan return
2009-07-01	Sergio Rodríguez	UD Salamanca	Deportivo de La Coruña	Loan return
2009-07-01	Sebastián Taborda	Hércules CF	Deportivo de La Coruña	Loan return
2009-07-01	Nenê	RCD Espanyol	AS Monaco	Loan return
2009-07-01	Nacho Pérez	Málaga CF	Getafe CF	Loan return
2009-07-01	Vladimir Stojković	Getafe CF	Sporting C.P.	Loan return
2009-07-01	Duda	Málaga CF	Sevilla FC	Loan return
2009-07-01	Lolo	Málaga CF	Sevilla FC	Loan return
2009-07-01	Albert Luque	Málaga CF	AFC Ajax	Loan return
2009-07-01	Pablo Barros	Málaga CF	Real Zaragoza	Loan return
2009-07-01	Adriano Ferreira	Málaga CF	Sport Club Internacional	Loan return
2009-07-01	Emilio Nsue	CD Castellón	RCD Mallorca	Loan return
2009-07-01	Ion Erice	Cádiz CF	CA Osasuna	Loan return
2009-07-01	Jokin Esparza	SD Huesca	CA Osasuna	Loan return
2009-07-01	Nicolás Medina	SD Huesca	CA Osasuna	Loan return
2009-07-01	Tiago Gomes	CA Osasuna	S.L. Benfica	Loan return
2009-07-01	Antonio Hidalgo	CA Osasuna	Real Zaragoza	Loan return
2009-07-01	Iván Bolado	Elche CF	Racing de Santander	Loan return
2009-07-01	Juanjo Expósito	Deportivo Alavés	Racing de Santander	Loan return
2009-07-01	Ebi Smolarek	Bolton Wanderers	Racing de Santander	Loan return
2009-07-01	Vitolo	Aris Thessaloniki	Racing de Santander	Loan return
2009-07-01	Brian Sarmiento	Xerez CD	Racing de Santander	Loan return
2009-07-01	Ezequiel Garay	Racing de Santander	Real Madrid	Loan return
2009-07-01	László Sepsi	Racing de Santander	S.L. Benfica	Loan return
2009-07-01	Jonathan Pereira	Racing de Santander	Villarreal CF	Loan return
2009-07-01	Peter Luccin	Racing de Santander	Real Zaragoza	Loan return
2009-07-01	Nikola Žigić	Racing de Santander	Valencia CF	Loan return
2009-07-01	Julien Faubert	Real Madrid	West Ham United	Loan return
2009-07-01	Tom De Mul	K.R.C. Genk	Sevilla FC	Loan return
2009-07-01	Carlos Bellvís	CD Numancia	Valencia CF	Loan return
2009-07-01	Álvaro Antón	CD Numancia	Real Valladolid	Loan return
2009-07-01	Asier Arranz	Xerez CD	Real Valladolid	Loan return
2009-07-01	Marcos García	Real Sociedad	Villarreal CF	Loan return
2009-07-01	Jozy Altidore	Xerez CD	Villarreal CF	Loan return
2009-07-01	Martí Crespí	Xerez CD	RCD Mallorca	Loan return
2009-07-01	Antonio Calle	Xerez CD	Gimnàstic de Tarragona	Loan return
2009-07-01	Addison	FC Cartagena	Hércules CF	Loan return
2009-07-01	Igor de Souza	Girona FC	Ipatinga	Loan return
2009-07-01	Miki Roque	FC Cartagena	Liverpool	Loan return
2009-07-01	Óscar Díaz	Celta de Vigo	RCD Mallorca	Loan return
2009-07-01	Jonathan Soriano	Albacete Balompié	RCD Espanyol	Loan return
2009-07-01	Fabiano Lima	Celta de Vigo	Genoa C.F.C.	Loan return
2009-07-01	Pablo Ruiz	Córdoba CF	Sevilla FC	Loan return
2009-07-01	Gustavo Oberman	Córdoba CF	CFR Cluj	Loan return
2009-07-01	Daniel Benítez	Elche CF	RCD Mallorca	Loan return
2009-07-01	Javier Iturriaga	SD Lemona	UD Salamanca	Loan return
2009-07-01	Abel Aguilar	Hércules CF	Udinese Calcio	Loan return
2009-07-01	Tuni	Hércules CF	RCD Mallorca	Loan return
2009-07-01	Rubén Castro	SD Huesca	Deportivo de La Coruña	Loan return
2009-07-01	Ángel Montoro	Real Murcia	Valencia CF	Loan return
2009-07-01	Lillo	Real Murcia	Valencia CF	Loan return
2009-07-01	Dinei	Celta de Vigo	Clube Atlético Paranaense	Loan return
2009-07-01	Víctor Casadesús	Gimnàstic de Tarragona	RCD Mallorca	Loan return
2009-07-01	Felipe Manoel	Levante UD	SD Huesca	Loan return
2009-07-01	Roberto Platero	SD Ponferradina	CD Numancia	Loan return
2009-07-01	Josu Villar	Real Unión	Real Sociedad	Loan return
2009-07-01	Sebastián Abreu	Real Sociedad	C.A. River Plate	Loan return
2009-07-01	Necati Ateş	Real Sociedad	Galatasaray	Loan return
2009-07-01	Boukary Dramé	Real Sociedad	FC Sochaux	Loan return
2009-07-01	Manu García	Real Unión	SD Eibar	Loan return
2009-07-01	Marco Rubén	Recreativo de Huelva	Villarreal CF	Loan return
2009-07-01	Nasief Morris	Recreativo de Huelva	Panathinaikos	Loan return
2009-07-01	Asier Riesgo	Recreativo de Huelva	Real Sociedad	Loan return
2009-07-01	Kanga Akalé	Recreativo de Huelva	RC Lens	Loan return
2009-07-01	Miku	UD Salamanca	Valencia CF	Loan return
2009-07-01	Robert Flores	C.A. River Plate	Villarreal CF	Loan return
2009-07-01	Pablo Cendrós	CD Tenerife	RCD Mallorca	Loan return
2009-07-01	Damián Escudero	Real Valladolid	Villarreal CF	Loan return
2009-07-01	Álex Bergantiños	Xerez CD	Deportivo de La Coruña	Loan return
2009-07-01	Jairo Álvarez	Lorca Deportiva CF	Deportivo de La Coruña	Loan return
2009-07-01	Pedro Alcalá	UD Marbella	Málaga CF	Loan return
2009-07-01	Popo	Antequera CF	Málaga CF	Loan return
2009-07-01	Carlos Carmona	FC Cartagena	RCD Mallorca	Loan return
2009-07-01	Henok Goitom	Real Valladolid	Real Murcia	Loan return
2009-07-01	Marcos Aguirre	Real Valladolid	Club Atlético Lanús	Loan return
2009-07-01	Pedro Oldoni	Real Valladolid	Clube Atlético Paranaense	Loan return
2009-07-01	Líbero Parri	Levante UD	Cádiz	Loan return
2009-07-01	Nano	Real Valladolid	Real Betis	Loan return
2009-07-01	Lionnel Franck	CD San Fernando	Xerez CD	Loan return
2009-07-01	Luciano Monzón	Real Betis	Boca Juniors	Loan return
2009-07-01	Álvaro Zazo	Lorca Deportiva CF	Rayo Vallecano	Loan return
2009-07-01	Miguel Pallardó	Levante UD	Getafe CF	Loan return
2009-07-01	Karim Benzema	Olympique Lyonnais	Real Madrid	€35m
2009-07-01	Miguel Ángel	Málaga CF	Gimnàstic de Tarragona	Loan
2009-07-01	Carlos Carmona	RCD Mallorca	Recreativo de Huelva	Free
2009-07-01	Fernando Velasco	Lucena CF	Cádiz CF	Free
2009-07-01	Juanito	Real Betis	Atlético Madrid	Free
2009-07-01	Guzmán Casaseca	Córdoba CF	CD Castellón	Free
2009-07-01	Jesús Mendoza	Xerez CD	Rayo Vallecano	Free
2009-07-01	Joseba Arriaga	Real Jaén	Cádiz CF	Free
2009-07-01	Javier Flaño	CA Osasuna	CD Numancia	Free
2009-07-01	Álex Blanco	Marino de Luanco	CD Numancia	Free
2009-07-02	Suso	CD Tenerife	Heart of Midlothian	Free
2009-07-02	Pablo Cendrós	RCD Mallorca	Levante UD	Loan
2009-07-02	David Lombán	Valencia CF	UD Salamanca	Loan
2009-07-02	Iván Marcano	Racing de Santander	Villarreal CF	€6m
2009-07-03	José Ángel Crespo	Sevilla FC	Racing de Santander	Loan
2009-07-03	David Pociello	Santa Eulàlia	Girona FC	Free
2009-07-03	Rafael Clavero	CD Tenerife	FC Cartagena	Free
2009-07-03	Alberto Cifuentes	UD Salamanca	Real Murcia	Free
2009-07-03	Isaac Jové	UD Salamanca	Real Murcia	Free
2009-07-03	Iñaki Bea	Real Valladolid	Real Murcia	Free
2009-07-03	Carlos Bellvís	Valencia CF	CD Tenerife	Free
2009-07-03	Joseba del Olmo	Athletic Bilbao	Hércules CF	Free
2009-07-03	Sergio Ortega	CD Numancia	Celta de Vigo	Free
2009-07-04	Jerónimo Barrales	Club Atlético Banfield	Recreativo de Huelva	Loan
2009-07-05	José María Movilla	Real Murcia	Rayo Vallecano	Free
2009-07-05	Daniel Giménez	Rayo Vallecano	SD Huesca	Loan
2009-07-06	Iván Pillud	Newell's Old Boys	RCD Espanyol	Loan
2009-07-06	Óscar Sánchez	Real Valladolid	Real Murcia	Free
2009-07-06	Nivaldo	Umm-Salal	Real Valladolid	Free
2009-07-06	Vasco Fernandes	Leixões S.C.	Celta de Vigo	Loan
2009-07-07	Miguel Albiol	Rayo Vallecano	Real Murcia	Free
2009-07-07	Alex Goikoetxea	Cultural y Deportiva Leonesa	UD Salamanca	Free
2009-07-07	Laionel Silva	Vitória F.C.	UD Salamanca	Loan
2009-07-07	Iñaki Descarga	Legia Warszawa	Real Unión	Free
2009-07-07	Pedro Vega	Levante UD	UD Las Palmas	Free
2009-07-07	José Manuel Catalá	Alicante CF	Villarreal CF B	Free
2009-07-07	Víctor Pérez	AD Alcorcón	SD Huesca	Free
2009-07-08	Sergio Asenjo	Real Valladolid	Atlético Madrid	€5.5m
2009-07-08	Diego Costa	Atlético Madrid	Real Valladolid	Free
2009-07-08	Jorge Luque	Xerez CD	Córdoba CF	Free
2009-07-08	Mikel Rico	Polideportivo Ejido	SD Huesca	Free
2009-07-08	Didier Zokora	Tottenham Hotspur	Sevilla FC	€10m
2009-07-08	Jaume Costa	Valencia CF	Cádiz CF	Loan
2009-07-08	David Córcoles	FC Barcelona Atlètic	Recreativo de Huelva	Free
2009-07-08	Sito Riera	RCD Espanyol	Panionios F.C.	Free
2009-07-08	Jônatas Domingos	RCD Espanyol	Botafogo	Loan
2009-07-09	Juan Quero	CD Numancia	Rayo Vallecano	Free
2009-07-09	Nano	Racing de Ferrol	CD Numancia	Free
2009-07-09	Mikel Dañobeitia	UD Salamanca	Córdoba CF	Free
2009-07-09	Mario Rosas	CD Castellón	Real Murcia	Free
2009-07-09	Jaroslav Plašil	CA Osasuna	Girondins Bordeaux	€3m
2009-07-09	Pablo Sánchez	UD Las Palmas	Recreativo de Huelva	Free
2009-07-09	Juanma Marrero	Rayo Vallecano	SD Huesca	Loan
2009-07-09	Jermaine Pennant	Liverpool	Real Zaragoza	Free
2009-07-10	Jandro Castro	Gimnàstic de Tarragona	Elche CF	Free
2009-07-10	Alberto de la Bella	Sevilla Atlético	Real Sociedad	Free
2009-07-10	Víctor Fernández	Real Valladolid	FC Cartagena	Free
2009-07-10	Rafael Jordá	Alicante CF	Hércules CF	Free
2009-07-10	Vicente Guaita	Valencia CF	Recreativo de Huelva	Loan
2009-07-10	Óscar de Marcos	Deportivo Alavés	Athletic Bilbao	Free
2009-07-11	Daniel Candeias	FC Porto	Recreativo de Huelva	Loan
2009-07-11	Ángel Díez	Racing de Santander B	Recreativo de Huelva	Free
2009-07-11	Enzo Maresca	Sevilla FC	Olympiacos F.C.	€1.2m
2009-07-11	Jonay Díaz	UD Las Palmas Atlético	SD Huesca	Free
2009-07-12	Daniel Mallo	Falkirk F.C.	Girona FC	Free
2009-07-13	Edu	Valencia CF	Corinthians	Free
2009-07-13	Henok Goitom	Real Murcia	UD Almería	€2.2m
2009-07-13	Emiliano Moretti	Valencia CF	Genoa C.F.C.	Loan
2009-07-13	Roberto Jiménez	Recreativo de Huelva	Atlético Madrid	€1.5m
2009-07-13	Iñaki Lafuente	Athletic Bilbao	CD Numancia	Free
2009-07-13	Juan Pablo Carrizo	S.S. Lazio	Real Zaragoza	Loan
2009-07-13	Bernardo Domínguez	Deportivo Alavés	Recreativo de Huelva	Free
2009-07-13	Rubén Durán	CD Lugo	Real Unión	Free
2009-07-13	Álvaro Cejudo	AD Ceuta	UD Las Palmas	Free
2009-07-13	Fernando Sales	Hércules CF	Albacete Balompié	Free
2009-07-13	Vivar Dorado	Real Valladolid	Albacete Balompié	Free
2009-07-14	Alberto Botía	FC Barcelona Atlétic	Sporting de Gijón	Loan
2009-07-14	Nuno Coelho	FC Porto	Villarreal CF B	Free
2009-07-14	José Mora	CD Castellón	Recreativo de Huelva	€0.2m
2009-07-14	Jorge García	Sporting de Gijón	Gimnàstic de Tarragona	Loan
2009-07-14	Antonio López	Gimnàstic de Tarragona	Albacete Balompié	Free
2009-07-14	Juanfran Moreno	Getafe CF	Real Madrid Castilla	Free
2009-07-14	Mikel Pagola	UD Salamanca	Deportivo Alavés	Free
2009-07-14	Fabricio Agosto	Deportivo de La Coruña	Real Valladolid	Free
2009-07-14	Valdo	RCD Espanyol	Málaga CF	Loan
2009-07-14	Richi Álvarez	Celta de Vigo B	Córdoba CF	Free
2009-07-14	Saulo dos Santos	Os Belenenses	Celta de Vigo	Free
2009-07-15	Nasief Morris	Panathinaikos	Racing de Santander	Loan
2009-07-15	Alberto Bueno	Real Madrid	Real Valladolid	€3m
2009-07-15	Cristo Marrero	CD Tenerife	Universidad de Las Palmas CF	Free
2009-07-15	Daniel Pérez	CD Alcoyano	FC Cartagena	Free
2009-07-15	Omar Hernández	Sporting de Gijón B	Málaga CF	Free
2009-07-15	Juanma Hernández	RCD Espanyol	Girona FC	Loan
2009-07-15	Ernesto Galán	RCD Espanyol	Girona FC	Loan
2009-07-15	Aitor Núñez	Atlético Madrid	CD Tenerife	Free
2009-07-15	Xabier Castillo	Real Sociedad	Athletic Bilbao	€1m
2009-07-15	Adrián Hernández	Universidad de Las Palmas CF	UD Las Palmas	Free
2009-07-15	Jesús Rueda	Real Valladolid B	Córdoba CF	Loan
2009-07-15	Daniel López	UD Las Palmas	Albacete Balompié	Free
2009-07-15	Ander Lafuente	Granada CF	FC Cartagena	Free
2009-07-15	Maxwell Andrade	F.C. Internazionale	FC Barcelona	€4.5m
2009-07-16	Rafael Gómez	CD Alcoyano	Elche CF	Free
2009-07-16	Javier Lara	RSD Alcalá	Elche CF	Free
2009-07-16	Jagoba Beobide	Real Sociedad B	Real Unión	Free
2009-07-16	Iriome González	CD Tenerife	SD Huesca	Loan
2009-07-16	Vicente Pascual	Real Zaragoza B	SD Huesca	Free
2009-07-16	Diego de Miguel	CD Numancia	CD Izarra	Loan
2009-07-16	Álvaro Silva	Málaga CF	Cádiz CF	Free
2009-07-16	Francisco Lledó	AD Ceuta	CD Castellón	Free
2009-07-16	Carlos Aranda	CD Numancia	CA Osasuna	€1.2m
2009-07-16	Jesús Coca	Real Madrid C	Córdoba CF	Free
2009-07-16	Daniel Carril	Hércules CF	Levante UD	Free
2009-07-16	Tiago Gomes	Estrela Amadora	Hércules CF	Free
2009-07-17	Santiago Santos	Cultural y Deportiva Leonesa	FC Cartagena	Free
2009-07-17	Emilio Nsue	RCD Mallorca	Real Sociedad	Loan
2009-07-17	Marc Torrejón	RCD Espanyol	Racing de Santander	€1.5m
2009-07-17	Endika Bordas	Córdoba CF	UD Salamanca	Free
2009-07-17	Manucho	Manchester United	Real Valladolid	Free
2009-07-17	Ricardo Oliveira	Real Betis	Al-Jazira Club	€14m
2009-07-17	Jorge Morcillo	Valencia CF	Córdoba CF	Free
2009-07-17	Mikel Álvaro	UE Lleida	CD Numancia	Free
2009-07-17	Francisco Rufete	RCD Espanyol	Hércules CF	Free
2009-07-18	Mikel Amantegui	Girona FC	Albacete Balompié	Free
2009-07-18	Arthuro	Flamengo	Celta de Vigo	Free
2009-07-18	Ikechukwu Uche	Getafe CF	Real Zaragoza	€5.5m
2009-07-18	Hugo Leal	CD Trofense	UD Salamanca	Free
2009-07-19	Antonio Amaro	UD Salamanca	Real Valladolid	Free
2009-07-19	Kike López	Real Valladolid	UD Salamanca	Free
2009-07-20	Daniel Mustafa	Estrela Amadora	SD Huesca	Free
2009-07-20	Sergio Tejera	Chelsea	RCD Mallorca	Loan
2009-07-20	Yuri Berchiche	Tottenham Hotspur	Real Valladolid	Free
2009-07-20	Cristian Hidalgo	Deportivo de La Coruña	Hércules CF	Free
2009-07-20	Pelé	FC Porto	Real Valladolid	Loan
2009-07-20	Maniche	Atlético Madrid	FC Köln	Free
2009-07-20	Kiko Ratón	Iraklis	Girona FC	Free
2009-07-20	Ximo Navarro	Valencia CF Mestalla	Elche CF	Loan
2009-07-20	Unai Expósito	Hércules CF	FC Cartagena	Free
2009-07-20	Manuel Blanco	Alicante CF	Albacete Balompié	Free
2009-07-20	Chus Herrero	Real Zaragoza	FC Cartagena	Free
2009-07-20	Antonio Longás	FC Barcelona Atlétic	FC Cartagena	Free
2009-07-20	Gorka Brit	CD Numancia	Real Unión	Free
2009-07-21	Javier García	Real Madrid	S.L. Benfica	€7m
2009-07-21	Francisco Sousa	Getafe CF	Albacete Balompié	Free
2009-07-21	Valentín Brasca	Talleres de Córdoba	Villarreal CF B	Free
2009-07-21	Iñigo Vélez	Athletic Bilbao	CD Numancia	Free
2009-07-21	David Lopes	FC Terek Grozny	Córdoba CF	Free
2009-07-21	Esteban Granero	Getafe CF	Real Madrid	€4m
2009-07-22	César Martín	Hércules CF	CD Castellón	Free
2009-07-22	Andrés Lamas	Recreativo de Huelva	UD Las Palmas	Loan
2009-07-22	Jonathan Valle	Racing de Santander	CD Castellón	Free
2009-07-22	Cristian Portilla	Racing de Santander	Sporting de Gijón	Free
2009-07-22	Sergio Sánchez	RCD Espanyol	Sevilla FC	€3m
2009-07-23	Stéphane Pignol	Real Zaragoza	UD Las Palmas	Free
2009-07-23	Grégory Béranger	RCD Espanyol	UD Las Palmas	Loan
2009-07-23	Antonio Guayre	CD Numancia	UD Las Palmas	Free
2009-07-23	Abel Aguilar	Udinese Calcio	Real Zaragoza	Loan
2009-07-23	Keirrison	Palmeiras	FC Barcelona	€14m
2009-07-23	Emilio Sánchez	Deportivo Alavés	Recreativo de Huelva	€0.24m
2009-07-23	Javier Herreros	Real Murcia Imperial	Córdoba CF	Free
2009-07-23	Joffre Guerrón	Getafe CF	Cruzeiro	Loan
2009-07-23	Dani Parejo	Real Madrid	Getafe CF	€3m
2009-07-23	Víctor Salas	CD Castellón	SD Ponferradina	Free
2009-07-24	Diego Tristán	West Ham United	Cádiz CF	Free
2009-07-24	Papa Diop	Gimnàstic de Tarragona	Racing de Santander	€1.5m
2009-07-24	César Arzo	Villarreal CF	Real Valladolid	Free
2009-07-24	Marcos García	Villarreal CF	Real Valladolid	Free
2009-07-24	Jesús Perera	Rayo Vallecano	Elche CF	Loan
2009-07-24	Iván Malón	Real Murcia	Pontevedra CF	Free
2009-07-24	Nilmar da Silva	Sport Club Internacional	Villarreal CF	€11m
2009-07-24	Joseba Garmendia	Athletic Bilbao	CD Numancia	Free
2009-07-24	Pedro Botelho	Arsenal	Celta de Vigo	Loan
2009-07-25	Fernando Forestieri	Genoa C.F.C.	Málaga CF	Loan
2009-07-25	Jordi Pablo	Villarreal CF	Málaga CF	Free
2009-07-25	Milan Stepanov	FC Porto	Málaga CF	Loan
2009-07-25	Alberto Zapater	Real Zaragoza	Genoa C.F.C.	€4.5m
2009-07-25	Serge N'Gal	Gimnàstic de Tarragona	CD Tenerife	€0.2m
2009-07-25	Luis Doménech	Elche CF	Benidorm CD	Free
2009-07-25	Juanmi Callejón	RCD Mallorca	Albacete Balompié	Loan
2009-07-26	Luciano González	UD Salamanca	Polideportivo Ejido	Free
2009-07-26	César Diop	SO Cassis Carnoux	Gimnàstic de Tarragona	Free
2009-07-27	Curro Torres	Valencia CF	Gimnàstic de Tarragona	Free
2009-07-27	Renan Brito	Valencia CF	Xerez CD	Loan
2009-07-27	Samuel Eto'o	FC Barcelona	F.C. Internazionale	Free
2009-07-27	Zlatan Ibrahimović	F.C. Internazionale	FC Barcelona	€45m
2009-07-27	Dani Tortolero	Gimnàstic de Tarragona	Girona FC	Free
2009-07-28	Juanlu	Real Betis	Levante UD	Free
2009-07-28	David Generelo	Real Zaragoza	Elche CF	Free
2009-07-28	Óscar Arpón	Gimnàstic de Tarragona	UD Logroñés	Free
2009-07-28	Alexandre Geijo	Levante UD	Racing de Santander	€1.8m
2009-07-28	Fernando Morientes	Valencia CF	Olympique de Marseille	Free
2009-07-28	Moisés García	Gimnàstic de Tarragona	SD Huesca	Free
2009-07-28	Álvaro Arbeloa	Liverpool	Real Madrid	€4m
2009-07-28	Keirrison	FC Barcelona	S.L. Benfica	Loan
2009-07-29	Alexander Hleb	FC Barcelona	VfB Stuttgart	Loan
2009-07-29	Martín Cáceres	FC Barcelona	Juventus FC	Loan
2009-07-29	Markel Robles	SD Eibar	Real Unión	Free
2009-07-29	Facundo Roncaglia	Boca Juniors	RCD Espanyol	Loan
2009-07-30	Leandro Gioda	CA Independiente	Xerez CD	Loan
2009-07-30	Gabriel Heinze	Real Madrid	Olympique de Marseille	Free
2009-07-30	Ezequiel Luna	Tiro Federal	CD Tenerife	Free
2009-07-30	Jonathan Soriano	RCD Espanyol	FC Barcelona Atlétic	Free
2009-07-30	César Ortiz	Atlético Madrid B	Albacete Balompié	Loan
2009-07-30	Edinho	AEK Athens	Málaga CF	€0.9m
2009-07-30	Albert Luque	AFC Ajax	Málaga CF	Free
2009-07-30	Derek Boateng	FC Köln	Getafe CF	€0.7m
2009-07-31	Hernán Pérez	Club Libertad	Villarreal CF	€2m
2009-07-31	Sergio Rodríguez	Deportivo de La Coruña	Hércules CF	Free
2009-07-31	Christian Stuani	Reggina Calcio	Albacete Balompié	Loan
2009-07-31	László Sepsi	S.L. Benfica	Racing de Santander	Loan
2009-07-31	Hugo Viana	Valencia CF	SC Braga	Loan
2009-07-31	Pablo Ruiz	Sevilla FC	FC Cartagena	Free
2009-08-01	Ángel Martínez	RCD Espanyol	Rayo Vallecano	Loan
2009-08-01	Román Martínez	RCD Espanyol	CD Tenerife	Loan
2009-08-02	Juanito Gutiérrez	UD Almería	Málaga CF	Free
2009-08-03	Roberto Román	AD Alcorcón	Rayo Vallecano	Free
2009-08-03	Pablo Amo	Deportivo de La Coruña	Real Zaragoza	Free
2009-08-03	Josico	Fenerbahçe	UD Las Palmas	Free
2009-08-04	Emiliano Armenteros	Sevilla Atlético	Xerez CD	Free
2009-08-04	Xabi Alonso	Liverpool	Real Madrid	€30m
2009-08-05	Antonio Amaya	Rayo Vallecano	Wigan Athletic	€1.9m
2009-08-05	Mohamed Diamé	Rayo Vallecano	Wigan Athletic	€1.9m
2009-08-05	Klaas-Jan Huntelaar	Real Madrid	AC Milan	€15m
2009-08-05	Álex Cruz	Gimnàstic de Tarragona	CF Atlético Ciudad	Loan
2009-08-05	José Luis Cabrera	Deportivo Alavés	Córdoba CF	Free
2009-08-05	Jozy Altidore	Villarreal CF	Hull City	Loan
2009-08-05	Natalio Poquet	UD Almería	Real Murcia	Loan
2009-08-06	Javier Katxorro	Córdoba CF	Polideportivo Ejido	Free
2009-08-06	Edu	Real Betis	Sport Club Internacional	Free
2009-08-06	Javi Guerra	RCD Mallorca	Levante UD	Loan
2009-08-06	Ángel Montoro	Valencia CF	Real Unión	Loan
2009-08-06	Líbero Parri	Cádiz CF	Gimnàstic de Tarragona	Free
2009-08-06	Addison	Hércules CF	UD Puertollano	Free
2009-08-06	Antonio Notario	Celta de Vigo	Albacete Balompié	Free
2009-08-06	Ariel Rosada	Celta de Vigo	Boca Juniors	Free
2009-08-07	Enrique de Lucas	Real Murcia	FC Cartagena	Free
2009-08-08	Marko Babić	Hertha BSC	Real Zaragoza	Free
2009-08-08	Damián Lizio	C.A. River Plate	Córdoba CF	Loan
2009-08-10	Omar Pérez	C.A. Peñarol	CD Castellón	Free
2009-08-10	Fernando Morán	Hércules CF	Gimnàstic de Tarragona	Free
2009-08-10	Igor de Souza	Ipatinga	Levante UD	Loan
2009-08-10	Damián Ísmodes	Racing de Santander	Sporting Cristal	Loan
2009-08-10	Pascal Cygan	Villarreal CF	FC Cartagena	Free
2009-08-10	Luis García	Atlético Madrid	Racing de Santander	Free
2009-08-11	Mikel Balenziaga	Athletic Bilbao	CD Numancia	Loan
2009-08-11	Ander Murillo	Athletic Bilbao	UD Salamanca	Loan
2009-08-11	Mark González	Real Betis	CSKA Moscow	€6.5m
2009-08-11	Germán Pacheco	Atlético Madrid B	Rayo Vallecano	Loan
2009-08-12	Jito	Girona FC	Cultural y Deportiva Leonesa	Free
2009-08-12	Xavi Jiménez	Albacete Balompié	UE Lleida	Free
2009-08-12	Mariano Uglessich	Arsenal de Sarandí	Albacete Balompié	Free
2009-08-12	Kamel Ghilas	Celta de Vigo	Hull City	€2m
2009-08-13	Selim Ben Achour	Al Qadsia Kuwait	Málaga CF	Free
2009-08-14	Neru	Sporting de Gijón	Deportivo Alavés	Free
2009-08-14	Víctor Sánchez	FC Barcelona Atlétic	Xerez CD	Loan
2009-08-14	Mikel San José	Liverpool	Athletic Bilbao	Loan
2009-08-15	Moha	Real Sociedad	Girona FC	Free
2009-08-16	Mario Gibanel	Gimnàstic de Tarragona	UD Logroñés	Free
2009-08-16	Mark van den Boogaart	NEC Nijmegen	Real Murcia	Free
2009-08-17	Aythami	Deportivo de La Coruña	Xerez CD	Re-Loan
2009-08-17	Xisco Campos	Real Murcia	CD Castellón	Loan
2009-08-17	Míchel Salgado	Real Madrid	Blackburn Rovers	Free
2009-08-18	Alberto Quintero	Torrellano CF	FC Cartagena	Free
2009-08-18	Carlos Bueno	C.A. Peñarol	Real Sociedad	Loan
2009-08-18	Ritchie Kitoko	Albacete Balompié	Udinese Calcio	€2m
2009-08-18	David Prieto	Sevilla FC	Xerez CD	Loan
2009-08-18	Javier Guerrero	Recreativo de Huelva	UD Las Palmas	Free
2009-08-19	Ion Echaide	CA Osasuna B	SD Huesca	Loan
2009-08-19	Borja Rubiato	Cádiz CF	SD Huesca	Free
2009-08-19	András Simon	Liverpool	Córdoba CF	Loan
2009-08-19	Raúl Amarilla	Écija Balompié	Cádiz CF	Free
2009-08-19	Álvaro Negredo	Real Madrid	Sevilla FC	€14m
2009-08-20	Thiago Carleto	Valencia CF	Elche CF	Loan
2009-08-20	Bruno China	Leixões S.C.	RCD Mallorca	Free
2009-08-21	Pedro León	Real Valladolid	Getafe CF	€4m
2009-08-21	Fabiano Rossato	Málaga CF	UD Salamanca	Free
2009-08-21	Álvaro Antón	Real Valladolid	Recreativo de Huelva	Loan
2009-08-21	Rubén González	Celta de Vigo	RCD Mallorca	Free
2009-08-21	Javier González	Hércules CF	Club Portugalete	Free
2009-08-21	Guillermo Pereyra	BSC Young Boys	Real Murcia	Free
2009-08-21	Pedro Alcalá	Málaga CF	Real Unión	Loan
2009-08-22	Roberto Peragón	Alicante CF	Girona FC	Free
2009-08-22	Rubén Castro	Deportivo de La Coruña	Rayo Vallecano	Loan
2009-08-22	Óscar Trejo	RCD Mallorca	Elche CF	Loan
2009-08-22	Ivan Obradović	FK Partizan	Real Zaragoza	Free
2009-08-22	Ricardo Páez	Universidad César Vallejo	CD Castellón	Free
2009-08-23	Xisco Muñoz	Real Betis	Levante UD	Free
2009-08-24	Sisinio González	Recreativo de Huelva	Real Valladolid	Free
2009-08-24	Javier Castellano	RCD Mallorca	Albacete Balompié	Loan
2009-08-24	Miguel Palanca	Real Madrid Castilla	CD Castellón	Loan
2009-08-24	Agustín García	Real Madrid Castilla	Córdoba CF	Loan
2009-08-24	Javier Camuñas	Recreativo de Huelva	CA Osasuna	€1m
2009-08-25	Óscar Sielva	RCD Espanyol	FC Cartagena	Loan
2009-08-25	Roberto Platero	CD Numancia	Barakaldo CF	Loan
2009-08-25	Alejandro Alfaro	Sevilla FC	CD Tenerife	Re-Loan
2009-08-25	Dinei	Clube Atlético Paranaense	CD Tenerife	Loan
2009-08-25	Giancarlo Maldonado	Atlante FC	Xerez CD	Loan
2009-08-25	Antonio Troyano	Córdoba CF	UD Marbella	Loan
2009-08-25	Natxo Insa	SD Eibar	Villarreal CF B	Free
2009-08-25	José Manuel Casado	Sevilla Atlético	Xerez CD	Loan
2009-08-25	Albert Jorquera	FC Barcelona	Girona FC	Free
2009-08-25	Juan Forlín	Boca Juniors	RCD Espanyol	€4m
2009-08-26	Chando Torres	Villarreal CF B	Real Murcia	Free
2009-08-26	Fernando Marqués	Iraklis	RCD Espanyol	Free
2009-08-26	Marc Fachan	AJ Auxerre	Gimnàstic de Tarragona	Free
2009-08-26	Martí Crespí	RCD Mallorca	Elche CF	Loan
2009-08-26	Victor Obinna	F.C. Internazionale	Málaga CF	Loan
2009-08-26	Wesley Sneijder	Real Madrid	F.C. Internazionale	€15m
2009-08-26	Felipe Mattioni	Grêmio	RCD Mallorca	Loan
2009-08-26	Zdeněk Zlámal	Udinese Calcio	Cádiz CF	Loan
2009-08-26	Gustavo Savoia	Ponte Preta	Córdoba CF	Free
2009-08-27	Álex Bergantiños	Deportivo de La Coruña	Xerez CD	Re-Loan
2009-08-27	Dmytro Chyhrynskyi	Shakhtar Donetsk	FC Barcelona	€25m
2009-08-27	Arjen Robben	Real Madrid	Bayern Munich	€25m
2009-08-27	Leonel Altobelli	Club Atlético Tigre	Albacete Balompié	Loan
2009-08-27	Toché Verdú	Albacete Balompié	FC Cartagena	Free
2009-08-27	Duda	Sevilla FC	Málaga CF	€0.4m
2009-08-28	Albert Serra	Girona FC	Levante UD	Free
2009-08-28	Noé Pamarot	Portsmouth	Hércules CF	Free
2009-08-28	Nacho Pérez	Getafe CF	Real Betis	Free
2009-08-28	José Juan Luque	Málaga CF	Real Murcia	Free
2009-08-28	Mehrdad Oladi	Al-Shabab	Xerez CD	Free
2009-08-28	Fabián Assmann	CA Independiente	UD Las Palmas	Loan
2009-08-28	Javier Iturriaga	UD Salamanca	Club Portugalete	Free
2009-08-29	Popo	Málaga CF	UD Logroñés	Free
2009-08-29	Fabián Orellana	Udinese Calcio	Xerez CD	Loan
2009-08-29	Miguel Ángel Angulo	Valencia CF	Sporting Clube de Portugal	Free
2009-08-30	Eiður Guðjohnsen	FC Barcelona	AS Monaco	Free
2009-08-30	Julio Álvarez	UD Almería	RCD Mallorca	Free
2009-08-31	Bruno Fornaroli	U.C. Sampdoria	Recreativo de Huelva	Loan
2009-08-31	Aarón Ñíguez	Valencia CF	Celta de Vigo	Loan
2009-08-31	Magnus Troest	Genoa C.F.C.	Recreativo de Huelva	Loan
2009-08-31	Henrique	FC Barcelona	Racing de Santander	Loan
2009-08-31	Xisco Jiménez	Newcastle United	Racing de Santander	Loan
2009-08-31	Roberto Santamaría	UD Las Palmas	Málaga CF	Loan
2009-08-31	Ionel Dănciulescu	Dinamo București	Hércules CF	Free
2009-08-31	Ranko Despotović	Real Murcia	UD Salamanca	Loan
2009-08-31	Mateo Musacchio	C.A. River Plate	Villarreal CF B	Free
2009-08-31	Miguel Torres	Real Madrid	Getafe CF	€2m
2009-08-31	Álex Quillo	Atlético Madrid B	UD Almería	Free
2009-08-31	Ruymán Hernández	UD Las Palmas	UD Vecindario	Free
2009-08-31	Salva Ballesta	Málaga CF	Albacete Balompié	Free
2009-08-31	Javier Almirón	Deportivo Alavés	Girona FC	Free
2009-08-31	Pere Martí	Málaga CF	Real Murcia	Loan
2009-08-31	Brian Sarmiento	Racing de Santander	Girona FC	Loan
2009-08-31	Branko Ilič	Real Betis	FC Moscow	Loan
2009-08-31	Paulo Pezzolano	Liverpool de Montevideo	RCD Mallorca	Loan
2009-08-31	Borja Valero	West Bromwich Albion	RCD Mallorca	Loan
2009-08-31	David Cuéllar	Real Murcia	UD Salamanca	Free
2009-08-31	Sidi Keita	RC Lens	Xerez CD	Loan
2009-08-31	Tiago Dutra	Villarreal CF	Maccabi Haifa	Loan
2009-08-31	Roberto Batres	Atlético Madrid B	Albacete Balompié	Free
2009-08-31	Antonio Hidalgo	Real Zaragoza	Albacete Balompié	Free
2009-08-31	Hiroshi Ibusuki	Girona FC	Real Madrid Castilla	Loan
2009-08-31	Nano González	FC Cartagena	Cádiz CF	Free
2009-08-31	Reinaldo Gonçalves	Esporte Clube Bahia	SD Huesca	Free
2009-08-31	Alberto García	Real Murcia	Córdoba CF	Free
2009-08-31	Gerardo García	Real Sociedad	Córdoba CF	Free
2009-08-31	Dardo Caballero	River Plate de Montevideo	Córdoba CF	Free
2009-08-31	Juanjo Expósito	Racing de Santander	Córdoba CF	Loan
2009-08-31	Bartholomew Ogbeche	Real Valladolid	Cádiz CF	Loan
2009-08-31	Jonan García	SD Huesca	UE Lleida	Loan
2009-08-31	Cheli	Málaga CF	UE Lleida	Free
2009-08-31	Gerardo Carrera	UD Las Palmas	Pontevedra CF	Free
2009-08-31	Toño Ramírez	Real Sociedad	CD Tenerife	Loan
2009-08-31	Aleix Vidal	RCD Espanyol	Gimnàstic de Tarragona	Free
2009-08-31	John Heitinga	Atlético Madrid	Everton	€7.5m
2009-08-31	Antonio Calle	Xerez CD	Girona FC	Free
2009-08-31	Ángel Lafita	Deportivo de La Coruña	Real Zaragoza	€2m

== See also ==
- List of Spanish football transfers winter 2009–10
