= List of Spanish football transfers winter 2008–09 =

This is a list of Spanish football transfers for the January sale in the 2008–09 season of La Liga and Segunda División. Only moves from La Liga and Segunda División are listed.

The winter transfer window opened on 1 January 2009, although a few transfers took place prior to that date. The window closed at midnight on 31 January 2009. Players without a club could have joined one at any time, either during or in between transfer windows. Clubs below La Liga level could also have signed players on loan at any time. If need be, clubs could have signed a goalkeeper on an emergency loan, if all others were unavailable.

== Winter 2008–09 transfer window ==
Date	Name	Moving from	Moving to	Fee
2008-10-29	(Norway) Håvard Nordtveit	(Spain) UD Salamanca	(England) Arsenal	Loan return
2008-11-19	(Spain) Sergio Fernández	(Spain) Real Zaragoza	(Spain) CA Osasuna	Loan
2008-11-26	(Brazil) Thiago Carleto	(Brazil) Santos	(Spain) Valencia CF	€2m
2008-11-27	(Uruguay) Sebastián Taborda	(Spain) Deportivo de La Coruña	(Spain) Hércules CF	Loan
2008-12-02	(Netherlands) Klaas-Jan Huntelaar	(Netherlands) Ajax	(Spain) Real Madrid	€27m
2008-12-05	(Brazil) Igor de Souza	(Brazil) Ipatinga	(Spain) Girona FC	Loan
2008-12-10	(Germany) Timo Hildebrand	(Spain) Valencia CF	(Germany) 1899 Hoffenheim	Free
2008-12-12	(Spain) Carlos Aranda	Free agent	(Spain) CD Numancia	Free
2008-12-16	(Brazil) Felipe Manoel	(Spain) SD Huesca	(Spain) Levante UD	Loan
2008-12-17	(Spain) Dani Parejo	(England) Queens Park Rangers	(Spain) Real Madrid	Loan return
2008-12-17	(Spain) Toni Moral	(Spain) Deportivo Alavés	(Spain) Racing de Santander	€0.65m
2008-12-18	(Spain) Pablo de Lucas	(Spain) Sporting de Gijón	(Spain) Deportivo Alavés	Free
2008-12-18	(Spain) Roberto Platero	(Spain) CD Numancia	(Spain) SD Ponferradina	Loan
2008-12-19	(Brazil) Adriano	(Brazil) Internacional	(Spain) Málaga CF	Loan
2008-12-20	(Spain) Gaizka Toquero	(Spain) SD Eibar	(Spain) Athletic Bilbao	Loan return
2008-12-22	(France) Lassana Diarra	(England) Portsmouth	(Spain) Real Madrid	€20m
2008-12-26	(Spain) Pablo García	(Spain) Albacete Balompié	(Spain) Cultural y Deportiva Leonesa	Loan
2008-12-26	(Serbia) Nikola Žigić	(Spain) Valencia CF	(Spain) Racing de Santander	Loan
2008-12-27	(Spain) Francisco Sousa	(Spain) Getafe CF	(Spain) Rayo Vallecano	Loan
2008-12-28	(Israel) Dudu Aouate	(Spain) Deportivo de La Coruña	(Spain) RCD Mallorca	€1m
2008-12-28	(Argentina) Estéfano Di Mago	(Argentina) Club Atlético San Telmo	(Spain) UD Las Palmas	Free
2008-12-29	(Spain) Julián López de Lerma	(Spain) RCD Espanyol	(Greece) Panthrakikos	Loan
2008-12-30	(Spain) Toché Verdú	(Spain) CD Numancia	(Spain) Albacete Balompié	Free
2008-12-30	(Spain) Pitu	(Spain) CF Gavà	(Spain) UD Las Palmas	Loan return
2008-12-30	(Mexico) Javier Iturriaga	(Spain) UD Salamanca	(Spain) SD Lemona	Loan
2008-12-30	(Spain) Luis Castro	(Spain) UD Salamanca	(Spain) CD Guijuelo	Loan
2008-12-31	(Spain) Ricardo Molina	(Spain) Alicante CF	(Spain) Orihuela CF	Free
2009-01-03	(Japan) Ibusuki Hiroshi	(Japan) Kashiwa Reysol	(Spain) Girona FC	Free
2009-01-04	(Spain) Felipe Sanchón	(Greece) Aris Thessaloniki	(Spain) Girona FC	Loan
2009-01-06	(Spain) Mikel Arruabarrena	(Poland) Legia Warszawa	(Spain) SD Eibar	Loan
2009-01-09	(Uruguay) Sebastián Abreu	(Argentina) River Plate	(Spain) Real Sociedad	Loan
2009-01-09	(Spain) Ramón Pereira	(Spain) SD Huesca	(Spain) CD Atlético Baleares	Free
2009-01-10	(Portugal) Fábio Coentrão	(Spain) Real Zaragoza	(Portugal) S.L. Benfica	Loan return
2009-01-12	(Spain) Marc Pedraza	(Spain) Deportivo Alavés	(Spain) RCD Espanyol	Loan return
2009-01-13	(Spain) Javier Casas	(Spain) Athletic Bilbao	(Spain) Córdoba CF	Loan
2009-01-13	(Spain) Juanma Valero	(Spain) Real Murcia	(Spain) Orihuela CF	Free
2009-01-13	(Spain) Sergio Rodríguez	(Spain) Deportivo de La Coruña	(Spain) UD Salamanca	Loan
2009-01-13	(Spain) Iñaki Lafuente	(Spain) Athletic Bilbao	(Spain) Sporting de Gijón	Loan
2009-01-14	(Switzerland) Alain Nef	(Italy) Udinese Calcio	(Spain) Recreativo de Huelva	Loan
2009-01-14	(Switzerland) Xavier Margairaz	(Spain) CA Osasuna	(Switzerland) FC Zürich	Loan
2009-01-15	(Belgium) Tom de Mul	(Spain) Sevilla FC	(Belgium) K.R.C. Genk	Loan
2009-01-16	(Spain) Miguel Ramos	(Spain) Girona FC	(Spain) UDA Gramenet	Free
2009-01-16	(Spain) Héctor Simón	(Spain) Girona FC	(Spain) Cultural y Deportiva Leonesa	Loan
2009-01-16	(Spain) Daniel Castellano	(Spain) RCD Mallorca	(Spain) Deportivo Alavés	Loan
2009-01-16	(Spain) Samuel Bayón	(Spain) Deportivo Alavés	(Spain) FC Cartagena	Loan
2009-01-16	(Spain) Albert Cano	(Spain) Albacete Balompié	(Spain) Orihuela CF	Loan
2009-01-16	(Argentina) Cristian Maidana	(Russia) FC Spartak Moscow	(Spain) Recreativo de Huelva	Loan
2009-01-19	(Spain) Mikel Pagola	(Spain) UD Salamanca	(Spain) SD Ponferradina	Free
2009-01-20	(Germany) David Odonkor	Free agent	(Spain) Real Betis	Free
2009-01-20	(Spain) César Sánchez	(England) Tottenham Hotspur	(Spain) Valencia CF	Loan
2009-01-21	(Brazil) Edmílson	(Spain) Villarreal C.F.	(Brazil) Palmeiras	Free
2009-01-22	(Spain) Natalio Poquet	(Spain) UD Almería	(Spain) Córdoba CF	Loan
2009-01-22	(Spain) César Díaz	(Spain) Albacete Balompié	(Spain) Zamora CF	Free
2009-01-23	(Serbia) Vladimir Stojković	(Portugal) Sporting C.P.	(Spain) Getafe CF	Loan
2009-01-26	(Argentina) Roberto Abbondanzieri	(Spain) Getafe CF	(Argentina) Boca Juniors	€0.3m
2009-01-26	(Spain) Ion Erice	(Spain) SD Huesca	(Spain) Cádiz CF	Free
2009-01-27	(Spain) Josu Etxaniz	(Spain) SD Eibar	(Spain) Barakaldo CF	Loan
2009-01-27	(Spain) Antonio Hidalgo	(Spain) Real Zaragoza	(Spain) CA Osasuna	Loan
2009-01-27	(Spain) Jonan García	(Spain) SE Eivissa-Ibiza	(Spain) SD Huesca	Loan
2009-01-27	(Croatia) Marko Babić	(Spain) Real Betis	(Germany) Hertha BSC	Loan
2009-01-28	(Honduras) Walter Martínez	(China) Beijing Guoan	(Spain) Deportivo Alavés	Loan
2009-01-28	(Spain) Mikel Alonso	Free agent	(Spain) CD Tenerife	Free
2009-01-29	(Spain) Santiago Asensio	(Spain) Girona FC	(Spain) CE L'Hospitalet	Free
2009-01-29	(Serbia) Nebojša Marinković	(Serbia) FK Čukarički Stankom	(Spain) Gimnàstic de Tarragona	Loan
2009-01-29	(Spain) Álvaro García	(Spain) Alicante CF	(Spain) Cádiz CF	Free
2009-01-30	(Spain) Jokin Esparza	(Spain) CA Osasuna	(Spain) SD Huesca	Loan
2009-01-30	(Spain) Abel Moreno	(Romania) FC Steaua București	(Spain) Xerez CD	Free
2009-01-30	(Spain) Javier Selvas	(Spain) Deportivo Alavés	(Spain) Zamora CF	Loan
2009-01-30	(Cameroon) Guillaume Nkendo	(Spain) Albacete Balompié	(Spain) UD Alzira	Loan
2009-01-30	(Spain) Álex Colorado	(Spain) Xerez CD	(Spain) AD Ceuta	Loan
2009-01-30	(Argentina) Gustavo Oberman	(Romania) CFR Cluj	(Spain) Córdoba CF	Loan
2009-01-30	(Spain) José Mari	Free agent	(Spain) Gimnàstic de Tarragona	Free
2009-01-30	(United States) Jozy Altidore	(Spain) Villarreal C.F.	(Spain) Xerez CD	Loan
2009-01-30	(France) Julien Faubert	(England) West Ham United	(Spain) Real Madrid	Loan
2009-01-30	(Spain) Jonathan Soriano	(Spain) RCD Espanyol	(Spain) Albacete Balompié	Loan
2009-01-30	(Chile) Nicolás Corvetto	(Italy) Udinese Calcio	(Spain) Albacete Balompié	Loan
2009-01-30	(Nigeria) Matthew Edile	(Nigeria) Weekend Soccer Academy	(Spain) UD Salamanca	Free
2009-01-30	(Nigeria) Kabiru Akinsola	(Tunisia) Étoile Sportive du Sahel	(Spain) UD Salamanca	Free
2009-01-30	(Spain) Juanjo Expósito	(Spain) Racing de Santander	(Spain) Deportivo Alavés	Loan
2009-01-31	(Spain) Raúl Bravo	(Greece) Olympiacos F.C.	(Spain) CD Numancia	Loan
2009-01-31	(Slovakia) Marian Kelemen	(Greece) Aris Thessaloniki	(Spain) CD Numancia	Free
2009-01-31	(Ivory Coast) Lago Junior	(Ivory Coast) Issia Wazi	(Spain) CD Numancia	Free
2009-01-31	(Brazil) Pedro Oldoni	(Brazil) Atlético Paranaense	(Spain) Real Valladolid	Loan
2009-01-31	(Uruguay) Iván Alonso	(Spain) Real Murcia	(Spain) RCD Espanyol	€2.4m
2009-01-31	(Spain) Lalo	(Spain) SD Huesca	(Spain) Águilas CF	Free
2009-01-31	(Brazil) Ricardo Oliveira	(Spain) Real Zaragoza	(Spain) Real Betis	€9m
2009-01-31	(Argentina) Leonardo Ponzio	(Argentina) River Plate	(Spain) Real Zaragoza	Free
2009-01-31	(Peru) Damián Ismodes	(Spain) Racing de Santander	(Spain) SD Eibar	Loan
2009-01-31	(France) Rudy Carlier	(France) RC Strasbourg	(Spain) SD Eibar	Free
2009-01-31	(Brazil) Gabriel Fernando	(Russia) FC Rubin Kazan	(Spain) Gimnàstic de Tarragona	Loan

== See also ==
- List of Spanish football transfers summer 2008
