= 2009–10 La Liga =

79th season of La Liga

La Liga
- Season: 2009–10
- Dates: 29 August 2009 – 16 May 2010
- Champions: Barcelona; 20th title
- Relegated: Valladolid; Tenerife; Xerez
- Champions League: Barcelona; Real Madrid; Valencia; Sevilla
- Europa League: Atlético Madrid (as Europa League winners); Getafe; Villarreal
- Matches: 380
- Goals: 1,031 (2.71 per match)
- Top goalscorer: Lionel Messi (34 goals)
- Biggest home win: Real Madrid 6–0 Zaragoza (19 December 2009)
- Biggest away win: Tenerife 0–5 Barcelona (10 January 2010)
- Highest scoring: Real Madrid 6–2 Villarreal (21 February 2010)

The 2009–10 La Liga (known as the Liga BBVA for sponsorship reasons) was the 79th season of La Liga since its establishment. Barcelona were the defending champions, having won their 19th La Liga title in the previous season. The campaign began on 29 August 2009, and concluded on 16 May 2010; all top-flight European leagues ended earlier than the previous season due to the impending 2010 FIFA World Cup. A total of 20 teams contested the league, 17 of which already contested in the 2008–09 season, and three of which were promoted from the Segunda División. In addition, a new match ball – the Nike T90 Ascente – served as the official ball for all matches.

On 16 May 2010, Barcelona secured a second consecutive La Liga title, and twentieth league title overall, following a 4–0 home victory against Valladolid. Barcelona's Lionel Messi won the La Liga award for Best Player for a second straight season.

Real Madrid's 96 points made them the runners-up with the highest points total in the history of Europe's top five leagues, until this was surpassed by Liverpool's 97 points in the 2018–19 Premier League.

== Promotion and relegation ==
Teams promoted from 2008–09 Segunda División

- Xerez CD (debut in top tier)
- Real Zaragoza
- CD Tenerife

Teams relegated to 2009–10 Segunda División

- Real Betis
- CD Numancia
- Recreativo de Huelva

== Team information ==
=== Stadia and locations ===
Location of teams in La Liga 2009–10
Location of teams in La Liga 2009–10 (Canary Islands)

Team	Club home city	Venue	Capacity
Almería	Almería	Estadio del Mediterráneo	22,000
Athletic Bilbao	Bilbao	San Mamés	39,750
Atlético Madrid	Madrid	Vicente Calderón	54,851
Barcelona	Barcelona	Camp Nou	98,772
Deportivo La Coruña	A Coruña	Riazor	34,600
Espanyol	Barcelona	Estadi Cornellà-El Prat	40,500
Getafe	Getafe	Coliseum Alfonso Pérez	17,700
Málaga	Málaga	La Rosaleda	28,963
Mallorca	Palma de Mallorca	ONO Estadi	23,142
Osasuna	Pamplona	Estadio Reyno de Navarra	19,800
Racing Santander	Santander	El Sardinero	22,271
Real Madrid	Madrid	Santiago Bernabéu	80,354
Sevilla	Sevilla	Ramón Sánchez Pizjuán	48,649
Sporting	Gijón	El Molinón	25,885
Tenerife	Santa Cruz de Tenerife	Heliodoro Rodríguez López	24,000
Valencia	Valencia	Mestalla	55,000
Valladolid	Valladolid	Estadio José Zorrilla	26,512
Villarreal	Vila-real	El Madrigal	25,000
Xerez	Jerez de la Frontera	Chapín	20,523
Zaragoza	Zaragoza	La Romareda	34,596

=== Personnel and sponsoring ===
Team	Chairman	Head Coach	Kit manufacturer	Shirt sponsor	Shirt sponsor (back)	Shirt sponsor (sleeve)	Shorts sponsor	Socks sponsor
Almería	(Spain) Alfonso García	(Spain) Juanma Lillo	UDA	None	Andalucía	None	None	None
Athletic Bilbao	(Spain) Fernando García Macua	(Spain) Joaquín Caparrós	Umbro	Petronor	Euskadi	Diputación Foral de Vizcaya	None	None
Atlético Madrid	(Spain) Enrique Cerezo	(Spain) Quique Sánchez Flores	Nike	Kia	Kyocera	None	Paf	None
Barcelona	(Spain) Joan Laporta	(Spain) Pep Guardiola	Nike	UNICEF	None	TV3	None	None
Deportivo La Coruña	(Spain) Augusto Lendoiro	(Spain) Miguel Ángel Lotina	Lotto	Estrella Galicia	None	None	None	None
Espanyol	(Spain) Daniel Sánchez Llibre	(Argentina) Mauricio Pochettino	Uhlsport	Interapuestas.com	Trina Solar	TV3	Abasol	None
Getafe	(Spain) Ángel Torres	(Spain) Míchel	Joma	Burger King	Grupo Galco	None	SDS Seguridad	None
Málaga	(Spain) Fernando Sanz	(Spain) Juan Muñiz	Umbro	William Hill	Andalucía	Tesesa	Clínicas Rincón Torre del Mar, Málaga 2016 Capital Europea de la Cultura	None
Mallorca	(Spain) Tomeu Vidal	(Spain) Gregorio Manzano	In-house/Macron	Illes Balears/Air Europa	Construcciones Llabrés Feliu	ib-red	Meliá Hoteles, Illes Balears	Quely
Osasuna	(Spain) Patxi Izco	(Spain) José Antonio Camacho	Diadora	Yingli Solar	NGS Technology	Caja Navarra	Reyno de Navarra, NGS Technology	None
Racing Santander	(Spain) Francisco Pernía	(Spain) Miguel Ángel Portugal	SLAM	None	None	Fundación Seve Ballesteros	None	None
Real Madrid	(Spain) Florentino Pérez	(Chile) Manuel Pellegrini	Adidas	bwin.com	None	None	None	None
Sevilla	(Spain) José María del Nido	(Spain) Antonio Álvarez	Joma	12BET	Andalucía	12BET	12BET	None
Sporting	(Spain) Manuel Vega-Arango	(Spain) Manolo Preciado	Astore	Gijón, Asturias	Vegasol	Asturias Paraíso Natural, Deporte Asturiano	Asturias Paraíso Natural, Gijón, Deporte Asturiano	None
Tenerife	(Spain) Miguel Concepción	(Spain) José Luis Oltra	Puma	CajaCanarias (H)/Tenerife disfruta de todo (A)	Televisión Canaria, Cepsa	Televisión Canaria (H)/Islas Líneas Aéreas (A), CajaCanarias	CajaCanarias, Televisión Canaria	None
Valencia	(Spain) Manuel Llorente	(Spain) Unai Emery	Kappa	Unibet	None	None	Herbalife	None
Valladolid	(Spain) Carlos Suárez Sureda	(Spain) Javier Clemente	Puma	Caja Duero	En tu corazón Valladolid	Vino Emina Sin	Banco de Castilla, Del Cura y Miranda AXA	None
Villarreal	(Spain) Fernando Roig	(Spain) Juan Carlos Garrido	Puma	Aeroport Castelló	None	Canal Nou	None	None
Xerez	(Argentina) Federico Souza	(Argentina) Néstor Gorosito	Legea	Cajasol	None	None	None	None
Zaragoza	(Spain) Agapito Iglesias	(Spain) José Aurelio Gay	Adidas	Telefónica	None	None	None	None

== Managerial changes ==
Team	Outgoing manager	Manner of departure	Date of vacancy	Replaced by	Date of appointment	Position in table
Málaga	(Spain) Antonio Tapia	Mutual consent	1 June 2009	(Spain) Juan Muñiz	13 June 2009	8th (2008–09)
Real Madrid	(Spain) Juande Ramos	End of contract	1 June 2009	(Chile) Manuel Pellegrini	2 June 2009	2nd (2008–09)
Villarreal	(Chile) Manuel Pellegrini	Signed for Real Madrid and thus purchased rights for €4m	2 June 2009	(Spain) Ernesto Valverde	2 June 2009	5th (2008–09)
Racing Santander	(Spain) Juan Muñiz	Mutual consent	13 June 2009	(Spain) Juan Carlos Mandiá	26 June 2009	12th (2008–09)
Xerez	(Spain) Esteban Vigo	Mutual consent	28 June 2009	(Spain) José Ángel Ziganda	8 July 2009	1st in Segunda División (2008–09)
Atlético Madrid	(Spain) Abel Resino	Sacked	23 October 2009	(Spain) Quique Sánchez Flores	23 October 2009	15th
Racing Santander	(Spain) Juan Carlos Mandiá	Sacked	9 November 2009	(Spain) Miguel Ángel Portugal	19 November 2009	17th
Zaragoza	(Spain) Marcelino	Sacked	12 December 2009	(Spain) José Aurelio Gay	23 December 2009	17th
Almería	(Mexico) Hugo Sánchez	Sacked	20 December 2009	(Spain) Juanma Lillo	23 December 2009	17th
Xerez	(Spain) José Ángel Ziganda	Sacked	12 January 2010	(Argentina) Néstor Gorosito	19 January 2010	20th
Villarreal	(Spain) Ernesto Valverde	Sacked	31 January 2010	(Spain) Juan Carlos Garrido	1 February 2010	9th
Valladolid	(Spain) José Luis Mendilibar	Sacked	1 February 2010	(Spain) Onésimo Sánchez	1 February 2010	17th
Sevilla	(Spain) Manolo Jiménez	Sacked	23 March 2010	(Spain) Antonio Álvarez	26 March 2010	5th
Valladolid	(Spain) Onésimo Sánchez	Sacked	5 April 2010	(Spain) Javier Clemente	6 April 2010	19th

== League table ==
Pos	Team	Pld	W	D	L	GF	GA	GD	Pts	Qualification or relegation
1	Barcelona (C)	38	31	6	1	98	24	+74	99	Qualification for the Champions League group stage
2	Real Madrid	38	31	3	4	102	35	+67	96	Qualification for the Champions League group stage
3	Valencia	38	21	8	9	59	40	+19	71	Qualification for the Champions League group stage
4	Sevilla	38	19	6	13	65	49	+16	63	Qualification for the Champions League play-off round
5	Mallorca	38	18	8	12	59	44	+15	62 (Note: Mallorca could not qualify for the 2010–11 UEFA Europa League due to being immersed in a creditor contest, a situation against UEFA criteria. Then, Villarreal was invited to replace this spot.)	
6	Getafe	38	17	7	14	58	48	+10	58	Qualification for the Europa League play-off round
7	Villarreal	38	16	8	14	58	57	+1	56	Qualification for the Europa League play-off round
8	Athletic Bilbao	38	15	9	14	50	53	−3	54	
9	Atlético Madrid	38	13	8	17	57	61	−4	47 (Note: DEP 2–1 ATM; ATM 3–0 DEP)	Qualification for the Europa League group stage (Note: Since Atlético Madrid won the 2009–10 UEFA Europa League they earned a spot in the group stage of the 2010–11 UEFA Europa League.)
10	Deportivo La Coruña	38	13	8	17	35	49	−14	47	
11	Espanyol	38	11	11	16	29	46	−17	44	
12	Osasuna	38	11	10	17	37	46	−9	43	
13	Almería	38	10	12	16	43	55	−12	42	
14	Zaragoza	38	10	11	17	46	64	−18	41	
15	Sporting Gijón	38	9	13	16	36	51	−15	40	
16	Racing Santander	38	9	12	17	42	59	−17	39	
17	Málaga	38	7	16	15	42	48	−6	37	
18	Valladolid (R)	38	7	15	16	37	62	−25	36 (Note: VLD 3–3 TEN; TEN 0–0 VLD. As the aggregate score is a draw (3–3), the team with the higher goal difference between these two teams qualifies first and over the other one (Valladolid 18th, with −25; Tenerife 19th with −34))	Relegation to the Segunda División
19	Tenerife (R)	38	9	9	20	40	74	−34	36	Relegation to the Segunda División
20	Xerez (R)	38	8	10	20	38	66	−28	34	Relegation to the Segunda División

Source: LFP and Yahoo! Sport
Rules for classification: 1) points; 2) head-to-head points; 3) head-to-head goal difference; 4) head-to-head goals scored; 5) goal difference; 6) number of goals scored.
(C) Champions; (R) Relegated

== Results ==
Home \ Away	ALM	ATH	ATM	FCB	RCD	ESP	GET	MCF	MLL	OSA	RAC	RMA	SFC	RSG	TEN	VCF	VLD	VIL	XER	ZAR
Almería		1–4	1–0	2–2	1–1	0–1	1–0	1–0	1–1	2–0	2–2	1–2	2–3	3–1	1–1	0–3	0–0	4–2	1–0	1–0
Athletic Bilbao	4–1		1–0	1–1	2–0	1–0	2–2	1–1	1–3	2–0	4–3	1–0	0–4	1–2	4–1	1–2	2–0	3–2	3–2	0–0
Atlético Madrid	2–2	2–0		2–1	3–0	4–0	0–3	0–2	1–1	1–0	1–1	2–3	2–1	3–2	3–1	4–1	3–1	1–2	1–2	2–1
Barcelona	1–0	4–1	5–2		3–0	1–0	2–1	2–1	4–2	2–0	4–0	1–0	4–0	3–0	4–1	3–0	4–0	1–1	3–1	6–1
Deportivo La Coruña	0–0	3–1	2–1	1–3		2–3	1–3	1–0	1–0	1–0	1–1	1–3	1–0	1–1	3–1	0–0	0–2	1–0	2–1	0–1
Espanyol	2–0	1–0	3–0	0–0	2–0		0–2	2–1	1–1	2–1	0–4	0–3	2–0	0–0	2–1	0–2	1–1	0–0	0–0	2–1
Getafe	2–2	2–0	1–0	0–2	0–2	1–1		2–1	3–0	2–1	0–0	2–4	4–3	1–1	2–1	3–1	1–0	3–0	5–1	0–2
Málaga	1–2	1–1	3–0	0–2	0–0	2–1	1–0		2–1	1–1	1–2	1–1	1–2	1–1	1–1	0–1	0–0	2–0	2–4	1–1
Mallorca	3–1	2–0	4–1	0–1	2–0	2–0	3–1	1–1		2–0	1–0	1–4	1–3	3–0	4–0	3–2	3–0	1–0	2–0	4–1
Osasuna	1–0	0–0	3–0	1–1	3–1	2–0	0–0	2–2	0–1		1–3	0–0	0–2	1–0	1–0	1–3	1–1	1–1	1–1	2–0
Racing Santander	0–2	0–2	1–1	1–4	0–1	3–1	1–4	0–3	0–0	1–1		0–2	1–5	2–0	2–0	0–1	1–1	1–2	3–2	0–0
Real Madrid	4–2	5–1	3–2	0–2	3–2	3–0	2–0	2–0	2–0	3–2	1–0		3–2	3–1	3–0	2–0	4–2	6–2	5–0	6–0
Sevilla	1–0	0–0	3–1	2–3	1–1	0–0	1–2	2–2	2–0	1–0	1–2	2–1		3–0	3–0	2–1	1–1	3–2	1–1	4–1
Sporting Gijón	1–0	0–0	1–1	0–1	2–1	1–0	1–0	2–2	4–1	3–2	0–1	0–0	0–1		0–2	1–1	0–2	1–0	2–2	1–1
Tenerife	2–2	1–0	1–1	0–5	0–1	4–1	3–2	2–2	1–0	2–1	2–1	1–5	1–2	2–1		0–0	0–0	2–2	1–0	1–3
Valencia	2–0	2–0	2–2	0–0	1–0	1–0	2–1	1–0	1–1	3–0	0–0	2–3	2–0	2–2	1–0		2–0	4–1	3–1	3–1
Valladolid	1–1	2–2	0–4	0–3	4–0	0–0	0–0	1–1	1–2	1–2	2–1	1–4	2–1	2–1	3–3	2–4		0–2	0–0	1–1
Villarreal	1–1	2–1	2–1	1–4	1–0	0–0	3–2	2–1	1–1	0–2	2–0	0–2	3–0	1–0	5–0	2–0	3–1		2–0	4–2
Xerez	2–1	0–1	0–2	0–2	0–3	1–1	0–1	1–1	2–1	1–2	2–2	0–3	0–2	0–0	2–1	1–3	3–0	2–1		3–2
Zaragoza	2–1	1–2	1–1	2–4	0–0	1–0	3–0	2–0	1–1	0–1	2–2	1–2	2–1	1–3	1–0	3–0	1–2	3–3	0–0	

Source: LFP and futbol.sportec (in Spanish)
Legend: Blue = home team win; Yellow = draw; Red = away team win.

== Awards ==
=== La Liga Awards ===
La Liga's governing body, the Liga Nacional de Fútbol Profesional, honoured the competition's best players and coach with the La Liga Awards.

Award	Recipient
Best Player	(Argentina) Lionel Messi (Barcelona)
Best Coach	(Spain) Pep Guardiola (Barcelona)
Best Goalkeeper	(Spain) Víctor Valdés (Barcelona)
Best Defender	(Spain) Gerard Piqué (Barcelona)
Best Midfielder(s)	(Spain) Xavi (Barcelona) (Spain) Jesús Navas (Sevilla)
Best Forward	(Argentina) Lionel Messi (Barcelona)

==== Team of the Year ====
UEFA La Liga Team of the Year
Goalkeeper	(Spain) Víctor Valdés (Barcelona)			
Defenders	(Spain) Gerard Piqué (Barcelona)		(Spain) Carles Puyol (Barcelona)	(Spain) Sergio Ramos (Real Madrid)
Midfielders	(Spain) Pedro León (Getafe)	(Spain) Jesús Navas (Sevilla)	(Spain) David Silva (Valencia)	(Spain) Xavi (Barcelona)
Forwards	(Argentina) Lionel Messi (Barcelona)		(Portugal) Cristiano Ronaldo (Real Madrid)	(Argentina) Gonzalo Higuaín (Real Madrid)

=== Pichichi Trophy ===
The Pichichi Trophy is awarded to the player who scores the most goals in a season.

Rank	Player	Club	Goals
1	(Argentina) Lionel Messi	Barcelona	34
2	(Argentina) Gonzalo Higuaín	Real Madrid	27
3	(Portugal) Cristiano Ronaldo	Real Madrid	26
4	(Spain) David Villa	Valencia	21
5	(Uruguay) Diego Forlán	Atlético Madrid	18
6	(Sweden) Zlatan Ibrahimović	Barcelona	16
6	(Spain) Roberto Soldado	Getafe	16
8	(Brazil) Luís Fabiano	Sevilla	15
9	(Spain) Fernando Llorente	Athletic Bilbao	14
9	(Spain) Nino	Tenerife	14

- Source: futbol.sportec

=== Zamora Trophy ===
The Ricardo Zamora Trophy is awarded by newspaper Marca to the goalkeeper with the lowest ratio of goals conceded to matches played. A goalkeeper had to play at least 28 matches of 60 or more minutes to be eligible for the trophy.

Rank	Player	Club	Goals against	Matches	Average
1	(Spain) Víctor Valdés	Barcelona	24	38	0.63
2	(Spain) Iker Casillas	Real Madrid	35	38	0.92
3	(Spain) César Sánchez	Valencia	29	30	0.97
4	(Spain) Daniel Aranzubia	Deportivo La Coruña	42	36	1.17
5	(Spain) Ricardo	Osasuna	45	37	1.22

- Source: futbol.sportec

=== Top assists ===
Rank	Player	Club	Assists
1	(Spain) Xavi	Barcelona	14
2	(Brazil) Dani Alves	Barcelona	10
2	(Argentina) Lionel Messi	Barcelona	10
4	(Spain) Guti	Real Madrid	9
4	(Spain) Pedro León	Getafe	9
4	(Brazil) Marcelo	Real Madrid	9
4	(Spain) Jesús Navas	Sevilla	9
8	(Argentina) Éver Banega	Valencia	8
8	(Uruguay) Chory Castro	Mallorca	8
8	(Spain) Momo	Xerez	8
8	(Spain) Pedro Munitis	Racing Santander	8
8	(Spain) Borja Valero	Mallorca	8

- Source: ESPN Soccernet

=== Fair Play award ===
This award is given annually since 1999 to the team with the best fair play during the season. This ranking takes into account aspects such as cards, suspension of matches, audience behaviour and other penalties. This section not only aims to determine the best fair play, but also serves to break the tie in teams that are tied in all the other rules: points, head-to-head, goal difference and goals scored.

Rank	Club	Matches	Yellow card	Double Yellow Card/Ejection	Direct Red Card	Games of Suspension (Player, only when +3)	Games of Suspension (Club's Personnel)	Audience Behavior		Points
1	Real Madrid	38	85	2	3	–	–	–	–	98
2	Tenerife	38	86	2	2	–	1^{13}	–	–	101
3	Deportivo La Coruña	38	68	1	3	–	4^{10, 21, 28, 28}	1 Mild^{17}	–	104
4	Barcelona	38	73	2	3	–	4^{5, 18, 21, 25}	–	–	106
5	Mallorca	38	93	1	2	–	2^{6, 11}	–	–	111
6	Almería	38	98	3	2	–	–	1 Mild^{36}	–	115
7	Atlético Madrid	38	90	4	3	–	2^{1, 23}	1 Mild^{10}	–	122
8	Osasuna	38	83	3	6	–	–	2 Milds^{7, 11}, 1 Serious^{14}	–	123
8	Sporting Gijón	38	98	2	2	–	1^{34}	2 Milds^{20, 34}	–	123
10	Espanyol	38	110	6	1	–	–	–	–	125
11	Racing Santander	38	104	1	1	–	4^{5, 20, 24, 29}	–	–	129
12	Villarreal	38	95	5	4	–	1^{5}	2 Milds^{8, 37}	–	132
13	Athletic Bilbao	38	96	4	5	–	1^{22}	2 Milds^{7, 11}	–	134
13	Getafe	38	107	2	1	–	3^{5, 27, 28}	1 Mild^{22}	–	134
13	Valladolid	38	100	3	6	–	2^{10, 20}	–	–	134
16	Valencia	38	113	3	4	–	1^{24}	2 Milds^{3, 23}	–	146
17	Sevilla	38	101	4	6	–	2^{1}	2 Milds^{12, 19}	–	147
18	Xerez	38	100	4	5	–	5^{10, 23, 25, 31, 32}	1 Mild^{22}	–	153
19	Zaragoza	38	129	2	2	–	2^{10, 27}	1 Mild^{34}	–	154
20	Málaga	38	135	1	8	–	–	1 Mild^{23}	–	166

- Source: Guia As de La Liga 2010–11, p. 129 (sports magazine)

Source: RFEF Referee's reports, Competition Committee's Sanctions, Appeal Committee Resolutions, Spanish Sports Disciplinary Committee Resolutions and RFEF's Directory about Fair Play Rankings Legend:

Icon	Term	Points of sanction	Description
	Yellow Card	1 point/yellow card	
	Double Yellow Card/Ejection	2 points/double yellow card	
	Direct Red Card	3 points/red card	
	Games of Suspension (Player)	As many as banned games	When a player is banned for play more than 3 future games. This punishment overrides the possible red card which caused this sanction
	Games of Suspension (Club's Personnel)	5 points/banned game	When some person of the club (not player) is banned for x future games. This punishment overrides the possible red card which caused this sanction
	Audience Behaviour	Mild (5 points); Serious (6 points); Very Serious (7 points)	When the audience makes some altercations such as explosions, flares, throwing objects to the ground, racist chanting, etc.
	Closure of Stadium	10 points/match with closured stadium	When serious incidents happen which are punished by the closure of the stadium
It also accounts cards to non-players
The number in superscript is the corresponding round to the sanction
Important note: This table is not a count of cards and sanctions resulting from the matches, this table takes into account the removal or application of some cards and sanctions by the competent bodies (Competition Committee, Appeal Committee and Spanish Sports Disciplinary Committee)

=== Pedro Zaballa award ===
Atlético Madrid and Sevilla supporters

== Season statistics ==
=== Scoring ===
- First goal of the season:
  (Spain) Raúl for Real Madrid against Deportivo (29 August 2009).
- Last goal of the season:
  (Netherlands) Rafael van der Vaart for Real Madrid against Málaga (16 May 2010).

=== Hat-tricks ===
Player	For	Against	Result	Date	Reference
(Spain) Roberto Soldado	Getafe	Racing Santander	4–1 (A)	30 August 2009	
(Mali) Seydou Keita	Barcelona	Zaragoza	6–1 (H)	25 October 2009	
(Spain) Roberto Soldado	Getafe	Xerez	5–1 (H)	29 November 2009	
(Argentina) Lionel Messi	Barcelona	Tenerife	5–0 (A)	10 January 2010	
(Argentina) Lionel Messi	Barcelona	Valencia	3–0 (H)	14 March 2010	
(Argentina) Gonzalo Higuaín	Real Madrid	Valladolid	4–1 (A)	14 March 2010	
(Argentina) Lionel Messi	Barcelona	Zaragoza	4–2 (A)	21 March 2010	
(Portugal) Cristiano Ronaldo	Real Madrid	Mallorca	4–1 (A)	5 May 2010	

=== Discipline ===
- First yellow card of the season: (Spain) Dani Aranzubia for Deportivo La Coruña against Real Madrid (29 August 2009)
- First red card of the season: (Argentina) Leandro Gioda for Xerez against Mallorca (30 August 2009)

== Attendances ==
FC Barcelona drew the highest average home attendance in the 2009-10 edition of La Liga.

#	Football club	Home games	Average attendance
1	FC Barcelona	19	78,097
2	Real Madrid	19	74,921
3	Valencia CF	19	41,642
4	Atlético de Madrid	19	40,815
5	Sevilla FC	19	37,830
6	Athletic Club	19	36,642
7	RCD Espanyol	19	27,229
8	Real Zaragoza	19	24,632
9	Málaga CF	19	23,918
10	Real Sporting de Gijón	19	20,329
11	Deportivo de La Coruña	19	18,932
12	Real Valladolid	19	18,285
13	CD Tenerife	19	18,082
14	Villarreal CF	19	17,263
15	Osasuna	19	17,008
16	Xerez CD	19	16,708
17	Racing de Santander	19	16,515
18	RCD Mallorca	19	13,036
19	UD Almería	19	12,486
20	Getafe CF	19	11,347

== See also ==
- List of Spanish football transfers summer 2009
- List of Spanish football transfers winter 2009–10
- 2009–10 Segunda División
- 2009–10 Copa del Rey
