= List of Spanish football transfers summer 2008 =

This is a list of Spanish football transfers for the 2008–09 season of La Liga and Segunda División. The summer transfer window opened July 1, 2008 and closed on August 31, 2008. The mid-season winter transfer window will open on January 1, 2009 and run for the entire month until January 31, 2009. Players without a club could join one, either during or in between transfer windows. Although transfer made be confirmed before the opening day of each transfer window, they were not officially a member of the squad until the first day of each transfer window.

== Summer 2008 transfer window ==
Date	Name	Moving from	Moving to	Fee
2008-04-27	(Portugal) Hugo Viana	(Spain) Osasuna	(Spain) Valencia CF	Loan return
2008-04-29	(Spain) Javi García	(Spain) Osasuna	(Spain) Real Madrid	€4m
2008-05-13	(Argentina) Cristian Álvarez	(Argentina) Rosario Central	(Spain) RCD Espanyol	Undisclosed
2008-05-14	(Portugal) Manuel Fernandes	(Spain) Valencia CF	(England) Everton F.C.	Re-Loan
2008-05-14	(Turkey) İbrahim Kaş	(Turkey) Beşiktaş J.K.	(Spain) Getafe CF	Free
2008-05-18	(Spain) Saúl Berjón	(Spain) Playas de Jandía	(Spain) UD Las Palmas	Undisclosed
2008-05-18	(Spain) Vicente Moscardó	(Spain) UD Puertollano	(Spain) UD Las Palmas	Undisclosed
2008-05-18	(France) Grégory Béranger	(Spain) CD Numancia	(Spain) RCD Espanyol	Undisclosed
2008-05-20	(Uruguay) Sebastián Eguren	(Sweden) Hammarby IF	(Spain) Villarreal CF	€1.3m
2008-05-20	(Argentina) Ezequiel Garay	(Spain) Racing Santander	(Spain) Real Madrid	€10m
2008-05-21	(Spain) David Moreno	(Spain) Real Madrid Castilla	(Spain) UD Almería	Undisclosed
2008-05-21	(Argentina) Ezequiel Garay	(Spain) Real Madrid	(Spain) Racing Santander	Loan
2008-05-22	(Mexico) Omar Bravo	(Mexico) Guadalajara	(Spain) Deportivo de La Coruña	Free
2008-05-24	(Brazil) Edmílson	(Spain) FC Barcelona	(Spain) Villarreal CF	Free
2008-05-25	(Netherlands) John Heitinga	(Netherlands) AFC Ajax	(Spain) Atlético Madrid	€10m
2008-05-25	(Brazil) Ricardo Oliveira	(Italy) A.C. Milan	(Spain) Zaragoza	Undisclosed
2008-05-26	(Mali) Seydou Keita	(Spain) Sevilla FC	(Spain) FC Barcelona	Undisclosed
2008-05-27	(Spain) Gerard Piqué	(England) Manchester United	(Spain) FC Barcelona	Undisclosed
2008-05-27	(Spain) Joseba Llorente	(Spain) Valladolid	(Spain) Villarreal CF	€1m
2008-05-29	(Argentina) Lautaro Acosta	(Argentina) Lanús	(Spain) Sevilla FC	€7m
2008-05-30	(Italy) Antonio Cassano	(Spain) Real Madrid	(Italy) Sampdoria	Undisclosed
2008-05-30	(Spain) Manuel Pinto	(Spain) Celta de Vigo	(Spain) FC Barcelona	€0.5m
2008-05-31	(Italy) Gianluca Zambrotta	(Spain) FC Barcelona	(Italy) A.C. Milan	€8.5m
2008-06-02	(Spain) Gustavo García	(Spain) UD Fuerteventura	(Spain) UD Las Palmas	Undisclosed
2008-06-02	(Brazil) Felipe Melo	(Spain) UD Almería	(Italy) ACF Fiorentina	Undisclosed
2008-06-04	(Uruguay) Martín Cáceres	(Spain) Villarreal CF	(Spain) FC Barcelona	€16.5m
2008-06-06	(Mexico) Giovani dos Santos	(Spain) FC Barcelona	(England) Tottenham Hotspur	€11m
2008-06-06	(United States) Jozy Altidore	(United States) MLS (New York)	(Spain) Villarreal CF	€6.4m
2008-06-06	(Uruguay) Robert Flores	(Uruguay) River Plate	(Spain) Villarreal CF	Undisclosed
2008-06-06	(Spain) Jordi Gómez	(Spain) RCD Espanyol	(Wales) Swansea City	Loan
2008-06-06	(Spain) Sergio Sánchez	(Spain) Racing Santander	(Spain) RCD Espanyol	Loan return
2008-06-06	(Brazil) Eduardo Costa	(Spain) RCD Espanyol	(Brazil) Grêmio	Undisclosed
2008-06-10	(Spain) Vitolo	(Spain) Celta de Vigo	(Spain) Racing Santander	€3m
2008-06-16	(Spain) Pablo Hernández	(Spain) Getafe CF	(Spain) Valencia CF	€1m
2008-06-15	(Argentina) Esteban Solari	(Mexico) Universidad Nacional	(Spain) UD Almería	€4m
2008-06-17	(Poland) Adrian Sikora	(Poland) Groclin	(Spain) Murcia	Undisclosed
2008-06-17	(Spain) Antonio Núñez	(Spain) Celta de Vigo	(Spain) Murcia	Undisclosed
2008-06-17	(Spain) Ángel Montoro	(Spain) Valencia CF Mestalla	(Spain) Murcia	Undisclosed
2008-06-17	(Spain) Lillo	(Spain) Valencia CF Mestalla	(Spain) Murcia	Undisclosed
2008-06-17	(Spain) Joseba Del Olmo	(Spain) SD Eibar	(Spain) Athletic Bilbao	€0.3m
2008-06-17	(Spain) Gorka Kijera	(Spain) SD Lemona	(Spain) Bilbao Athletic	Undisclosed
2008-06-17	(Spain) Barkero	(Spain) Albacete	(Spain) CD Numancia	Undisclosed
2008-06-18	(Spain) Roberto Fernández	(Spain) Sporting de Gijón	(Spain) Osasuna	Free
2008-06-18	(Paraguay) Justo Villar	(Argentina) Newell's Old Boys	(Spain) Valladolid	Undisclosed
2008-06-19	(Spain) Fernando Navarro	(Spain) RCD Mallorca	(Spain) Sevilla FC	€4.7m
2008-06-19	(Argentina) Pablo Piatti	(Argentina) Estudiantes de La Plata	(Spain) UD Almería	Undisclosed
2008-06-19	(France) Abdoulay Konko	(Italy) Genoa CFC	(Spain) Sevilla FC	€8.5m
2008-06-20	(Spain) Dimas Delgado	(Spain) FC Barcelona Atlètic	(Spain) CD Numancia	Undisclosed
2008-06-20	(Spain) José Callejón	(Spain) Real Madrid Castilla	(Spain) RCD Espanyol	€1.2m
2008-06-20	(Cameroon) Christian Pouga	(Switzerland) AC Bellinzona	(Spain) Sevilla FC	Undisclosed
2008-06-20	(Spain) Francisco Noguerol	(Spain) Albacete Balompié	(Spain) Celta de Vigo	Undisclosed
2008-06-21	(Spain) Gaizka Toquero	(Spain) Sestao River Club	(Spain) Athletic Bilbao	Undisclosed
2008-06-22	(Spain) Iñaki Lafuente	(Spain) RCD Espanyol	(Spain) Athletic Bilbao	Loan return
2008-06-22	(Argentina) Clemente Rodríguez	(Spain) RCD Espanyol	(Russia) FC Spartak Moscow	Loan return
2008-06-22	(Brazil) Ewerthon	(Spain) RCD Espanyol	(Spain) Zaragoza	Loan return
2008-06-22	(Morocco) (Spain) Moha	(Spain) RCD Espanyol	Free Agent	Free
2008-06-23	(Iran) Masoud Shojaei	(United Arab Emirates) Sharjah FC	(Spain) Osasuna	Free
2008-06-23	(Ivory Coast) Koffi Romaric	(France) Le Mans	(Spain) Sevilla FC	€8m
2008-06-23	(Brazil) Michel	(Brazil) Flamengo	(Spain) UD Almería	Undisclosed
2008-06-24	(Argentina) María Calvo	(Spain) Recreativo de Huelva	(Argentina) Boca Juniors	Loan return
2008-06-24	(Spain) Adrián González	(Spain) Real Madrid	(Spain) Getafe CF	Undisclosed
2008-06-24	(Spain) Iván Cuéllar	(Spain) Atlético Madrid	(Spain) Sporting de Gijón	Undisclosed
2008-06-25	(Portugal) Marco Caneira	(Spain) Valencia CF	Sporting Portugal	Undisclosed
2008-06-25	(Spain) David Cuéllar	(Spain) Athletic Bilbao	(Spain) Murcia	Undisclosed
2008-06-25	(Equatorial Guinea) (Spain) Javier Balboa	(Spain) Real Madrid	(Portugal) S.L. Benfica	€6m
2008-06-25	(Spain) Ismael Falcón	(Spain) Atlético Madrid	(Spain) Celta de Vigo	Free
2008-06-25	(Spain) Roberto Trashorras	(Spain) UD Las Palmas	(Spain) Celta de Vigo	Undisclosed
2008-06-25	(Brazil) Fabiano Eller	(Spain) Atlético Madrid	(Brazil) Santos	Undisclosed
2008-06-27	(Spain) Mista	(Spain) Atlético Madrid	(Spain) Deportivo de La Coruña	Free
2008-06-27	(Argentina) Marcos Aguirre	(Spain) Valladolid	(Argentina) Lanús	Loan return
2008-06-27	(Spain) Sunny	(Spain) Valencia CF	(Spain) Osasuna	Loan
2008-06-27	(Spain) Braulio	(Spain) Atlético Madrid	(Spain) Zaragoza	Undisclosed
2008-06-28	(Argentina) Federico Bessone	(Spain) RCD Espanyol	(Wales) Swansea City	Free
2008-06-29	(Portugal) Marco	(Portugal) C.F. Os Belenenses	(Spain) Celta de Vigo	Undisclosed
2008-06-30	(Spain) Esteban Granero	(Spain) Getafe CF	(Spain) Real Madrid	Loan return
2008-06-30	(Spain) David Navarro	(Spain) RCD Mallorca	(Spain) Valencia CF	Loan return
2008-06-30	(Spain) Gerardo	(Spain) Málaga CF B	(Spain) UD Las Palmas	Undisclosed
2008-06-30	(Portugal) Deco	(Spain) FC Barcelona	(England) Chelsea F.C.	€10m
2008-06-30	(France) Lilian Thuram	(Spain) FC Barcelona	Retired	Free
2008-06-30	(Spain) Juanjo	(Spain) Sevilla Atlético	(Spain) Racing Santander	Loan return
2008-06-30	(Spain) Miquel Palanca	(Spain) RCD Espanyol	(Spain) Real Madrid Castilla	Undisclosed
2008-06-30	(Spain) Claudio Giráldez	(Spain) Real Madrid Castilla	(Spain) Atlético Madrid B	Undisclosed
2008-07-01	(Portugal) Carlos Martins	(Spain) Recreativo de Huelva	(Portugal) S.L. Benfica	€3m
2008-07-01	(Spain) Victor	(Spain) Real Sociedad	(Spain) RCD Mallorca	Loan return
2008-07-01	(Montenegro) Andrija Delibašić	(Spain) Real Sociedad	(Spain) RCD Mallorca	Loan return
2008-07-01	(Spain) Jordi López	(Spain) Racing Santander	(Spain) RCD Mallorca	Loan return
2008-07-01	(Uruguay) Mario Regueiro	(Spain) Murcia	(Spain) Valencia CF	Loan return
2008-07-01	(France) Ludovic Butelle	(Spain) Valladolid	(Spain) Valencia CF	Loan return
2008-07-01	(Chile) Nicolás Medina	(Spain) SD Eibar	(Spain) Osasuna	Loan return
2008-07-01	(Czech Republic) Tomáš Ujfaluši	(Italy) ACF Fiorentina	(Spain) Atlético Madrid	Free
2008-07-01	(Spain) Chapi	(Spain) Deportivo de La Coruña	(Belgium) Zulte-Waregem	Free
2008-07-01	(Spain) Antonio Hidalgo	(Spain) Málaga CF	(Spain) Zaragoza	Undisclosed
2008-07-01	(Spain) Albert Serrán	(Spain) RCD Espanyol	(Wales) Swansea City	£800,000
2008-07-01	(Portugal) Zé António	(Germany) Borussia Mönchengladbach	(Spain) Racing Santander	Undisclosed
2008-07-02	(Spain) Jacobo Sanz	(Spain) CD Numancia	(Spain) Valladolid	Undisclosed
2008-07-02	(Spain) Dani López	(Spain) UD Salamanca	(Spain) UD Las Palmas	Undisclosed
2008-07-02	(Serbia) Ranko Despotović	(Romania) FC Rapid București	(Spain) Murcia	Undisclosed
2008-07-02	(Brazil) Dani Alves	(Spain) Sevilla FC	(Spain) FC Barcelona	€34m
2008-07-02	(Denmark) Jon Dahl Tomasson	(Spain) Villarreal CF	(Netherlands) Feyenoord	Undisclosed
2008-07-02	(Spain) Jonathan Pereira	(Spain) Villarreal CF	(Spain) Racing Santander	Loan
2008-07-02	(Argentina) Jonás Gutiérrez	(Spain) RCD Mallorca	(England) Newcastle United	Undisclosed
2008-07-02	(Spain) Miguel Nieto	(Spain) Real Madrid Castilla	(Spain) UD Almería	Free
2008-07-02	(Spain) Luis García	(Spain) Getafe CF	(Spain) Celta de Vigo	Loan
2008-07-02	(Spain) Tito	(Spain) RCD Espanyol	(Poland) Legia Warsaw	Loan
2008-07-02	(Argentina) Mariano Barbosa	(Spain) Recreativo de Huelva	(Argentina) Estudiantes de La Plata	Undisclosed
2008-07-02	(Spain) Rafa	(Spain) Valladolid	(Spain) Getafe CF	Free
2008-07-02	(Argentina) Sebastián Nayar	(Argentina) Boca Juniors	(Spain) Recreativo de Huelva	Undisclosed
2008-07-03	(Argentina) Damián Escudero	(Argentina) Vélez Sársfield	(Spain) Villarreal CF	Undisclosed
2008-07-03	(Argentina) Leandro Somoza	(Spain) Villarreal CF	(Argentina) Vélez Sársfield	Undisclosed
2008-07-03	(Spain) Mario Suárez	(Spain) Atlético Madrid	(Spain) RCD Mallorca	Undisclosed
2008-07-03	(Venezuela) Julio Álvarez	(Spain) CD Numancia	(Spain) UD Almería	Undisclosed
2008-07-03	(France) Florent Sinama Pongolle	(Spain) Recreativo de Huelva	(Spain) Atlético Madrid	Undisclosed
2008-07-03	(Spain) Ángel Lafita	(Spain) Zaragoza	(Spain) Deportivo de La Coruña	€2m
2008-07-03	(Spain) Oscar Díaz	(Spain) Elche CF	(Spain) RCD Mallorca	Undisclosed
2008-07-04	(Brazil) Filipe Kasmirski	(Uruguay) C.A. Rentistas	(Spain) Deportivo de La Coruña	€2.2m
2008-07-04	(Germany) Eugen Polanski	(Germany) Borussia Mönchengladbach	(Spain) Getafe CF	Undisclosed
2008-07-04	(Spain) Esteban	(Spain) Celta de Vigo	(Spain) UD Almería	Undisclosed
2008-07-04	(Spain) Dídac	(Spain) RCD Espanyol B	(Spain) Murcia	Undisclosed
2008-07-04	(Spain) Raúl	(Spain) Athletic Bilbao	(Spain) UB Conquense	Loan
2008-07-04	(Spain) Campos	(Spain) Écija Balompié	(Spain) Murcia	Undisclosed
2008-07-04	(Spain) Juan Elía	(Spain) Osasuna	(Spain) Murcia	Free
2008-07-05	(Spain) Ayoze Díaz	(Spain) Racing Santander	(Spain) RCD Mallorca	Undisclosed
2008-07-05	(Spain) Josemi	(Spain) Villarreal CF	(Spain) RCD Mallorca	Undisclosed
2008-07-05	(Spain) Roberto Jiménez	(Spain) Atlético Madrid	(Spain) Recreativo de Huelva	Undisclosed
2008-07-06	(France) Grégory Coupet	(France) Lyon	(Spain) Atlético Madrid	€1.5m
2008-07-06	(Brazil) Paulo Assunção	(Portugal) F.C. Porto	(Spain) Atlético Madrid	Undisclosed
2008-07-06	(Uruguay) Fernando Fajardo	(Spain) Elche CF	(Spain) Celta de Vigo	Undisclosed
2008-07-07	(Argentina) Ariel Ibagaza	(Spain) RCD Mallorca	(Spain) Villarreal CF	€1.5m
2008-07-07	(Portugal) Zé Castro	(Spain) Atlético Madrid	(Spain) Deportivo de La Coruña	Loan
2008-07-07	(Guinea) Alhassane Keita	(Saudi Arabia) Al-Ittihad	(Spain) RCD Mallorca	Undisclosed
2008-07-08	(France) Rio Mavuba	(Spain) Villarreal CF	(France) Lille OSC	Undisclosed
2008-07-08	(Spain) Jurado	(Spain) Atlético Madrid	(Spain) RCD Mallorca	Loan
2008-07-08	(Spain) Daniel Güiza	(Spain) RCD Mallorca	(Turkey) Fenerbahçe S.K.	€17.4m
2008-07-08	(Argentina) Hernán Pellerano	(Argentina) Vélez Sársfield	(Spain) UD Almería	Loan
2008-07-08	(Spain) Asier del Horno	(Spain) Athletic Bilbao	(Spain) Valencia CF	Loan return
2008-07-09	(Uruguay) José Zamora	(Spain) RCD Espanyol	(Spain) Real Madrid Castilla	Undisclosed
2008-07-09	(Spain) Samu	(Spain) Racing Santander	(Spain) UD Las Palmas	Undisclosed
2008-07-10	(Uruguay) Pablo García	(Spain) Real Madrid	(Greece) PAOK	Free
2008-06-10	(Spain) Pablo Sánchez	(Spain) Sevilla Atlético	(Spain) UD Las Palmas	Undisclosed
2008-07-10	(Spain) César Arzo	(Spain) Villarreal CF	(Spain) Recreativo de Huelva	Undisclosed
2008-07-10	(Spain) Luis Prieto	(Spain) Athletic Bilbao	(Spain) Real Valladolid	Undisclosed
2008-07-10	(Turkey) Mehmet Aurélio	(Turkey) Fenerbahçe S.K.	(Spain) Betis	Undisclosed
2008-07-10	(Argentina) Marco Rubén	(Spain) Villarreal CF	(Spain) Recreativo de Huelva	Loan
2008-07-10	(Spain) Juan Pablo	(Spain) CD Tenerife	(Spain) CD Numancia	Free
2008-07-11	(Argentina) Damián Escudero	(Spain) Villarreal CF	(Spain) Valladolid	Loan
2008-07-11	(Uruguay) Robert Flores	(Spain) Villarreal CF	(Argentina) River Plate	Loan
2008-07-11	(Spain) Fernando	(Spain) Betis	(Spain) Málaga CF	Free
2008-07-11	(Spain) Unai Expósito	(Spain) Athletic Bilbao	(Spain) Hércules CF	Free
2008-07-12	(Spain) Galán	(Spain) Getafe CF B	(Spain) UD Las Palmas	Undisclosed
2008-07-12	(Spain) Roberto Platero	(Spain) Racing Santander	(Spain) CD Numancia	Undisclosed
2008-07-13	(Spain) Esteban Granero	(Spain) Real Madrid	(Spain) Getafe CF	Undisclosed
2008-07-13	(Spain) Daniel Aranzubia	(Spain) Athletic Bilbao	(Spain) Deportivo de La Coruña	Free
2008-07-14	(Ecuador) Joffre Guerrón	(Ecuador) LDU Quito	(Spain) Getafe CF	Undisclosed
2008-07-14	(Denmark) Christian Poulsen	(Spain) Sevilla FC	(Italy) Juventus FC	€9.75
2008-07-14	(Spain) Jorge Larena	(Spain) Celta de Vigo	(Spain) UD Las Palmas	Undisclosed
2008-07-14	(Spain) Adrián Colunga	(Spain) UD Las Palmas	(Spain) Recreativo de Huelva	€2.75m
2008-07-14	(Spain) Pitu	(Spain) UD Las Palmas	(Spain) CF Gavà	Loan
2008-07-14	(Spain) Carlos Merino	(Spain) UD Las Palmas	(Spain) Gimnàstic de Tarragona	Free
2008-07-14	(Sweden) Henok Goitom	(Spain) Murcia	(Spain) Valladolid	Loan
2008-07-15	(Spain) Rubén de la Red	(Spain) Getafe CF	(Spain) Real Madrid	€4.7m
2008-07-15	(Spain) Domingo Cisma	(Spain) UD Almería	(Spain) CD Numancia	Loan
2008-07-15	(Brazil) Ronaldinho	(Spain) FC Barcelona	(Italy) A.C. Milan	€21m
2008-07-15	(Spain) Iñigo Vélez	(Spain) Murcia	(Spain) Athletic Bilbao	Undisclosed
2008-07-16	(Argentina) Marcos Aguirre	(Argentina) Lanús	(Spain) Valladolid	Loan
2008-07-16	(Argentina) Pablo Aimar	(Spain) Zaragoza	(Portugal) S.L. Benfica	€6.5m
2008-07-16	(Belarus) Alexander Hleb	(England) Arsenal F.C.	(Spain) FC Barcelona	€15m
2008-07-17	(France) Sébastien Squillaci	(France) Lyon	(Spain) Sevilla FC	€6.3m
2008-07-17	(South Africa) Nasief Morris	(Greece) Panathinaikos	(Spain) Recreativo de Huelva	€1.5m
2008-07-17	(Uruguay) Canobbio	(Spain) Celta de Vigo	(Spain) Valladolid	Undisclosed
2008-07-17	(Spain) Iván Cuadrado	(Spain) Murcia	(Spain) Málaga CF	Undisclosed
2008-07-17	(Spain) Lolo	(Spain) Sevilla Atlético	(Spain) Málaga CF	Loan
2008-07-17	(Spain) Pere Martí	(Spain) Elche CF	(Spain) Málaga CF	Undisclosed
2008-07-17	(Spain) Nacho	(Spain) Getafe CF	(Spain) Málaga CF	Loan
2008-07-18	(Brazil) Francelino Matuzalem	(Spain) Zaragoza	(Italy) S.S. Lazio	Loan
2008-07-18	(United States) Danny Szetela	(Spain) Racing Santander	(Italy) Brescia	Re-Loan
2008-07-18	(Spain) Chico	(Spain) Cádiz CF	(Spain) UD Almería	Undisclosed
2008-07-18	(Cameroon) Achille Emana	(France) Toulouse FC	(Spain) Betis	Undisclosed
2008-07-21	(Cameroon) Daniel Kome	(Spain) Valladolid	(Spain) CD Tenerife	Undisclosed
2008-07-22	(Brazil) Henrique	(Brazil) Palmeiras	(Spain) FC Barcelona	€ 8m
2008-07-22	(Spain) Cristian Portilla	(Spain) Racing Santander	(Spain) SD Ponferradina	Loan
2008-07-22	(Spain) Jonathan Valle	(Spain) Racing Santander	(Spain) SD Ponferradina	Loan
2008-07-23	(Spain) Pablo Redondo	(Spain) Getafe CF	(Spain) Gimnàstic de Tarragona	Free
2008-07-23	(Brazil) Henrique	(Spain) FC Barcelona	(Germany) Bayer Leverkusen	Loan
2008-07-24	(Spain) Jordi Alba	(Spain) Valencia CF	(Spain) Gimnàstic de Tarragona	Undisclosed
2008-07-28	(Spain) Oleguer Presas	(Spain) FC Barcelona	(Netherlands) AFC Ajax	€ 3m
2008-07-29	(Spain) Santiago Ezquerro	(Spain) FC Barcelona	(Spain) Osasuna	Free
2008-07-29	(Spain) Roberto Soldado	(Spain) Real Madrid	(Spain) Getafe CF	Undisclosed
2008-07-29	(Brazil) (Spain) Fredson	(Spain) RCD Espanyol	(Brazil) Goiás	Free
2008-08-01	(Spain) Sisi	(Spain) Valencia CF	(Spain) Recreativo de Huelva	Undisclosed
2008-08-01	(Spain) Alberto Montejo	(Spain) Zaragoza	(Spain) CD Numancia	Undisclosed
2008-08-03	(Spain) Dani Parejo	(Spain) Real Madrid	(England) Queens Park Rangers	Loan
2008-08-04	(Netherlands) Rafael van der Vaart	(Germany) Hamburger SV	(Spain) Real Madrid	€13m
2008-08-07	(Argentina) Fabricio Coloccini	(Spain) Deportivo de La Coruña	(England) Newcastle United	€13m
2008-08-07	(Argentina) Aldo Duscher	(Spain) Racing de Santander	(Spain) Sevilla FC	Undisclosed
2008-06-25	(Spain) Reyes	(Spain) Atlético Madrid	(Portugal) S.L. Benfica	Loan
2008-08-10	(Spain) Marc Crosas	(Spain) FC Barcelona	(Scotland) Celtic F.C.	€500k
2008-08-11	(Spain) Juanmi Callejón	(Spain) Real Madrid Castilla	(Spain) RCD Mallorca	Undisclosed
2008-08-13	(Brazil) Renan	(Brazil) Internacional	(Spain) Valencia	€4
2008-08-14	(Brazil) Júlio Baptista	(Spain) Real Madrid	(Italy) A.S. Roma	€13m
2008-08-26	(Spain) Iñaki Astiz	(Spain) Osasuna	(Poland) Legia Warsaw	Free
2008-08-31	(Brazil) Robinho	(Spain) Real Madrid	(England) Manchester City	£32.5m

== See also ==
- List of Spanish football transfers winter 2008–09
