= 2000 Four Nations Tournament (Guangzhou) =

Tournament details
- Host country: China
- City: Guangzhou
- Dates: 14–16 January 2000
- Teams: 4 (from 4 confederations)
- Venue: 1 (in 1 host city)

Final positions
- Champions: China (1st title)
- Runners-up: Uruguay
- Third place: Jamaica
- Fourth place: New Zealand

Tournament statistics
- Matches played: 4
- Goals scored: 7 (1.75 per match)
- Top scorer(s): Seven players (1 goal each)

The 2000 Team China Four Nations Tournament (Chinese: 中国之队四国足球邀请赛) was the inaugural edition of the Four Nations Tournament, an official international football tournament hosted by the Chinese Football Association and International Sport and Leisure (ISL). It was held from 14 to 16 January 2000 in Guangzhou, China.

== Participants ==
The original participants for the tournament were China, New Zealand, South Korea and Yugoslavia. Uruguay and Jamaica accept the invitation after South Korea and Yugoslavia quit in December 1999.

- China (host)
- Jamaica
- New Zealand
- Uruguay

== Venues ==
Guangzhou	Tianhe Stadium is located in China
Tianhe Stadium	Tianhe Stadium is located in China
Capacity: 60,000	Tianhe Stadium is located in China

== Matches ==
All times are local, CST (UTC+8).

=== Bracket ===
Semi-finals
14 January - Guangzhou
Uruguay	2
Jamaica	0
14 January - Guangzhou
China	1
New Zealand	0

Final
16 January - Guangzhou
Uruguay	0
China	1
Third place
16 January - Guangzhou
Jamaica	2
New Zealand	1

=== Semi-finals ===
14 January 2000
18:30

Uruguay	2–0	Jamaica
Fajardo 11'; Pérez 74'

Tianhe Stadium, Guangzhou
Referee: Zhu Liuyi (China)
14 January 2000
20:30

China	1–0	New Zealand
Li Tie 49'		Wilkinson (red card) 85'

Tianhe Stadium, Guangzhou

=== Third-place playoff ===
16 January 2000
15:00

Jamaica	2–1	New Zealand
Whitmore 53'; Williams 77'		Elliott 20'

Tianhe Stadium, Guangzhou

=== Final ===
16 January 2000
17:00

China	1–0	Uruguay
Hao Haidong 5'

Tianhe Stadium, Guangzhou

2000 Four Nations Tournament

China
First title

== Statistics ==
=== Goalscorers ===
There were 7 goals scored in 4 matches, for an average of 1.75 goals per match.

1 goal

- (China) Hao Haidong
- (China) Li Tie
- (Uruguay) Fernando Fajardo
- (Uruguay) Omar Pérez
- (Jamaica) Theodore Whitmore
- (Jamaica) Andy Williams
- (New Zealand) Simon Elliott
