= Popo (footballer, born 1988) =

Spanish footballer

Personal information
- Full name: Adolfo Moyano Burgos
- Date of birth: 21 January 1988 (age 38)
- Place of birth: Torre del Mar, Spain
- Height: 1.65 m (5 ft 5 in)
- Position: Midfielder

Youth career
- 1998–2000: Torre del Mar
- 2000–2001: FB Torreño
- 2001–2006: Málaga

Senior career*
| Years | Team | Apps | (Gls) |
| 2006–2007 | Málaga B | 17 | (2) |
| 2007–2009 | Málaga | 8 | (1) |
| 2007–2008 | → Atlético Madrid B (loan) | 8 | (0) |
| 2008–2009 | → Antequera (loan) | 29 | (1) |
| 2009–2011 | Logroñés | 28 | (1) |
| 2011–2012 | Roquetas | 28 | (0) |
| 2012–2015 | Vélez | 43 | (6) |
| 2016–2018 | Vélez | 41 | (4) |

International career
| 2007 | Spain U19 | 2 | (0) |
- * Club domestic league appearances and goals as of 16 December 2018

Adolfo Moyano Burgos (born 21 January 1988), known as Popo, is a Spanish footballer who plays mainly as an attacking midfielder.

== Club career ==
Popo was born in Torre del Mar, Province of Málaga. After playing for all of Málaga CF's youth sides and making his debut as a senior with the reserve team, he first appeared with the main squad on 6 January 2007 in a Segunda División match against neighbours UD Almería: after having taken the pitch in the 67th minute, he scored the 2–1 winner for the hosts three minutes from the end; he made a further seven appearances during the season, as the Andalusians finally did not regain their La Liga status.

From 2007 to 2009, Popo served two Segunda División B loan spells, the second one to Antequera CF also in his native region, upon which he returned to Málaga and was told he was not in new coach Juan Ramón López Muñiz's plans, being released from his contract on 28 August. Shortly after, he moved to another club in the third level, UD Logroñés.
