= Quely =

Company founded in Majorca, Spain

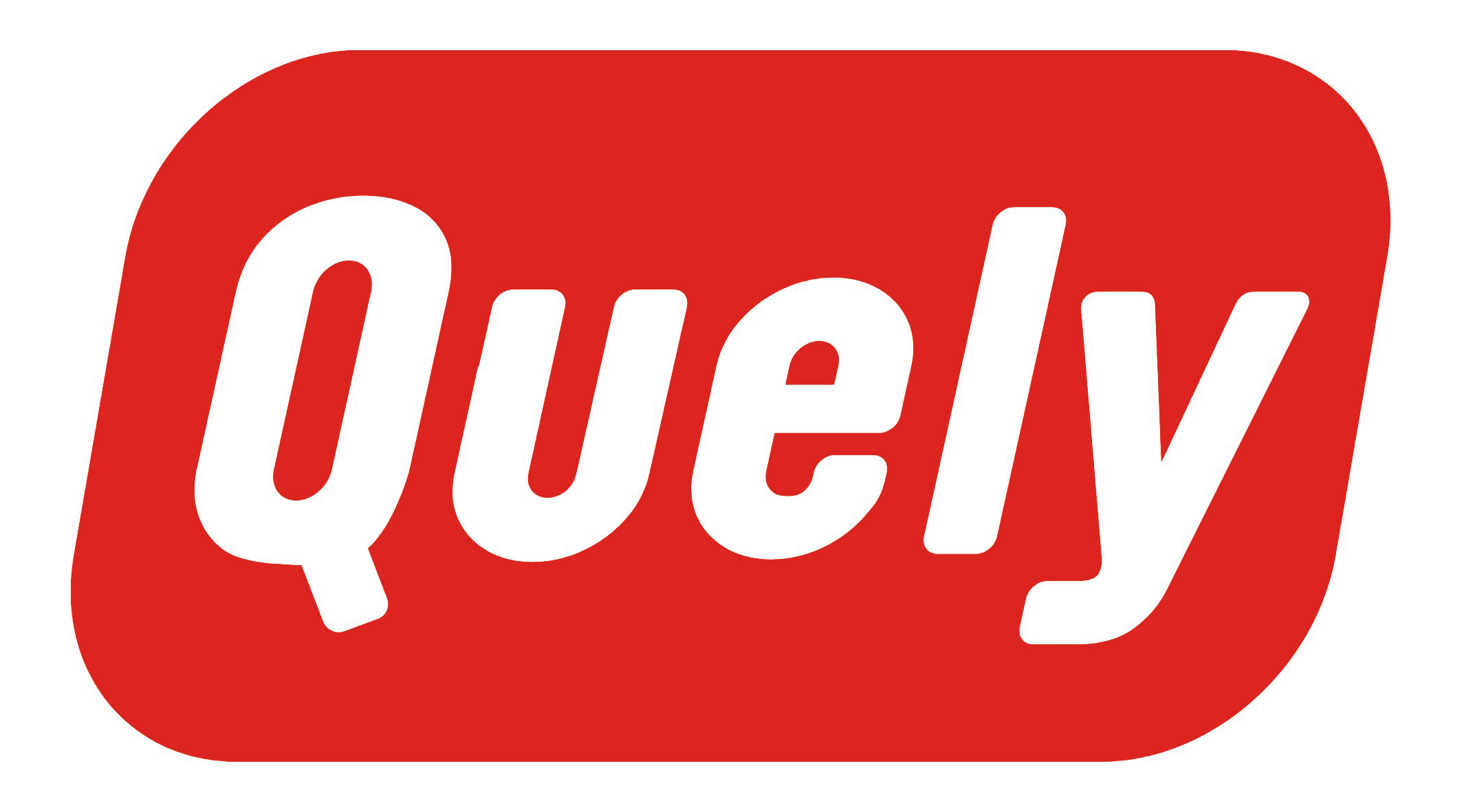
- Company type: Private
- Industry: Biscuit and baked goods manufacturing
- Founded: 1853
- Headquarters: Inca, Majorca, Spain
- Products: Biscuits, baked goods, chocolate-coated products
- Website: www.quely.es

Quely is a family-run company founded in Majorca, Spain, in 1853, that manufactures biscuits, baked goods, and chocolate-coated products.

== History ==
Quely biscuits date back to the 18th century to sailing companies who required food that could be stored for long periods of time. The oven in Can Guixe that produced these biscuits in the 19th century can still be seen in Inca today.

Jaime Doménech Borrás purchased land in 1934 to construct the first factory building, but production was delayed by the outbreak of the Spanish Civil War in 1936. It was 1940 before he was able to order all the necessary equipment. World War II caused further challenges, with the stonework oven being constructed during the war. After the death of Doménech in 1947, his sons, Jaime and Gabriel, completed his work, with the factory going into production in the following decade. Under the name "Quely" (the original choice of "Cor de Mallorca" unavailable due to then legal challenges), the biscuits became successful in the Mallorcan market during the 1960s.

In 1970, it became a public limited company as Quely, S.A. Since then, the company has modernized and expanded, with the entire factory being rebuilt after a fire in 1993 destroyed the building, machinery, and installations. Today, the company is still entirely Mallorcan and run by the family.

== Marketing ==
As of January 2010, native Mallorcan tennis star, Rafael Nadal became the international ambassador for Quely.
