= Dardo Caballero =

Uruguayan footballer (born 1981)

Personal information
- Full name: Dardo Fernando Caballero Ferrari
- Date of birth: March 9, 1981 (age 45)
- Place of birth: Montevideo, Uruguay
- Height: 1.90 m (6 ft 3 in)
- Position: Centre back

Senior career*
Years	Team	Apps	(Gls)
2003–2004	Huracán Buceo		
2005	Rentistas		
2006–2008	River Plate (Uruguay)		
2008	IL Hødd	13	(1)
2009–2010	Córdoba	0	(0)
- * Club domestic league appearances and goals as of 31 August 2010

Dardo Fernando Caballero Ferrari (born March 9, 1981) is an Uruguayan footballer who plays as a central defender.

== Football career ==
In his country, Caballero played for Huracán Buceo, C.A. Rentistas and Club Atlético River Plate. In 2008, he moved abroad, joining Norwegian side IL Hødd, for which he appeared 13 times, scoring once. At the end of 2008, the team was relegated.

In August 2009, after one year out of football, Caballero signed with Córdoba CF of the Spanish second division, one day before the summer transfer window closed.
