= Tiago Dutra =

Brazilian footballer (born 1990)

Personal information
- Full name: Tiago da Silva Dutra
- Date of birth: 17 September 1990 (age 36)
- Place of birth: Gravataí, Brazil
- Height: 1.76 m (5 ft 9 in)
- Position: Midfielder

Team information
- Current team: América de Natal

Senior career*
Years	Team	Apps	(Gls)
2009	Grêmio	0	(0)
2009–2011	Villarreal B	11	(0)
2009	→ Maccabi Haifa (loan)	2	(0)
2012–2014	Criciúma	3	(0)
2014	América de Natal	1	(0)

International career
2007	Brazil U17	3	(0)
- * Club domestic league appearances and goals as of 2 June 2013

Tiago da Silva Dutra (born 17 September 1990 in Gravataí, Rio Grande do Sul) is a Brazilian footballer who plays for América de Natal as a midfielder.
