= 12Bet =

Sports betting and casino company

12BET.com
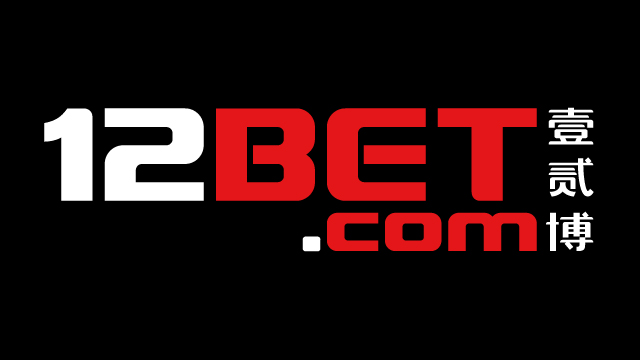
- Type: Private
- Industry: Online gambling
- Founded: 2007; 19 years ago
- Area served: International
- Products: Sports betting, casino
- Number of employees: 300–400
- Website: www.12bet.com

12Bet (stylised as 12BET and also known as 壹贰博) is an online gambling brand that provides sports betting and casino products and services in multiple languages across Europe and the Asia-Pacific.

== History ==
Pexcellent Services Ltd B.V. operates an online sports betting, e-casino, and gambling website under the brand name 12Bet. It is regulated and licensed in Curaçao to conduct remote betting and gambling business.

== Sponsorship ==
12BET started in 2007 and since then, they have a history of sponsoring sports events and football clubs as follows:

=== 2024 ===
- All England Open Badminton Championships - 3-years-deal - Official Partner

=== 2023 ===
- Leeds United F.C - 1-year-deal - Official Betting partner
- Leicester City F.C.- 1-year deal – Official Betting Partner

=== 2022 ===
- Wolverhampton Wanderers F.C - 1-year-deal - Official Sleeve partner

=== 2020 ===
- West Bromwich Albion FC - 2-year-deal - Official betting Partner

=== 2019 ===
- Triton Poker Montenegro - 1-year-deal - Official Betting Partner
- All England Badminton Championships - 1-yeat -deal - Official Betting Partner

=== 2018 ===
- Table tennis team World cup – 1-year deal – Official Partner

=== 2017 ===
- Taekwondo GP – 2-year deal – Official Partner
- Badminton World Championships – 1-year deal – Official Partner
- West Bromwich Albion F.C. – 1-year deal – Official Sleeve and Training Wear Partner
- World Cup of Pool – 1-year deal – Title Sponsor

=== 2016 ===
- Leicester City F.C.- 1-year deal – Official Betting Partner
- Arsenal F.C. – 3 years deal – Official Betting Partner

=== 2015 ===
- Swansea City F.C.– 1-year deal – Official Betting Partner

=== 2014 ===
- Badminton All England Championships – 1-year deal – official partner
- Hull City F.C. – 1-year deal – Front of shirt sponsor
- Coventry – 1-game deal (FA Cup V Arsenal) – Front of shirt sponsor

=== 2013 ===
- Crystal Palace F.C. – 1-year deal – Stadium Sponsor

=== 2011 ===
- Wigan Athletic F.C. – 3-year deal – Front of shirt sponsor

=== 2010 ===
- Snooker UK Championship – Title sponsor
- World Open Snooker – Title sponsor
- West Bromwich Albion F.C. – 1 season deal – Club Partner
- Birmingham City F.C. – 1 season deal – Club Partner
- Newcastle United F.C. – 2-year deal – Official Betting Partner

=== 2009 ===
- Sevilla F.C. – 2-year deal – Front of shirt sponsor
  - 12BET Sponsored Sevilla F.C. as The Official Shirt Sponsors in 2009 for 2 years. Sevilla, is Spain's oldest sporting club solely devoted to football.

== Awards ==
In the eGaming Review Magazine's Power Ranking, 12BET moved up to 17^{th} Best Online Gaming Operator in the world from their previous ranking of 28^{th} because of its odds and coverage of world sporting events.

== Controversy ==
Shortly after signing a stadium sponsorship deal with Crystal Palace, talks about renaming Selhurst Park to 12BET Stadium spread and ignited different reactions from its supporters. However, Crystal Palace management appeased its fans by stating that the stadium's name will not be changed.

Following the 2016 Cheltenham Horse Racing festival, 12BET had voided a large number of winning Cheltenham bets and closed the accounts of customers. 12BET argued that they had been subject to widespread bonus abuse by customers opening multiple accounts and claiming bonuses. However, after a furious response on social media, the bookie brand apologized and agreed to refund 75% of the affected customers. While ruling out a criminal investigation, the Isle of Man Constabulary continues to monitor allegations of withheld funds.
