= Islas Airways =

Spanish regional airline based in Tenerife, 2003–2012

Islas Líneas Aéreas Islas Airways
IATA	ICAO	Call sign
IF	ISW	PINTADERA
- Founded: 2002
- Commenced operations: February 2003
- Ceased operations: 15 October 2012
- Hubs: Tenerife North Airport
- Focus cities: Gran Canaria International Airport
- Frequent-flyer program: Islas Premium
- Fleet size: 6
- Destinations: 6
- Headquarters: Santa Cruz de Tenerife, Canarias, Spain
- Key people: Miguel Concepción Cácares
- Website: islasairways.com

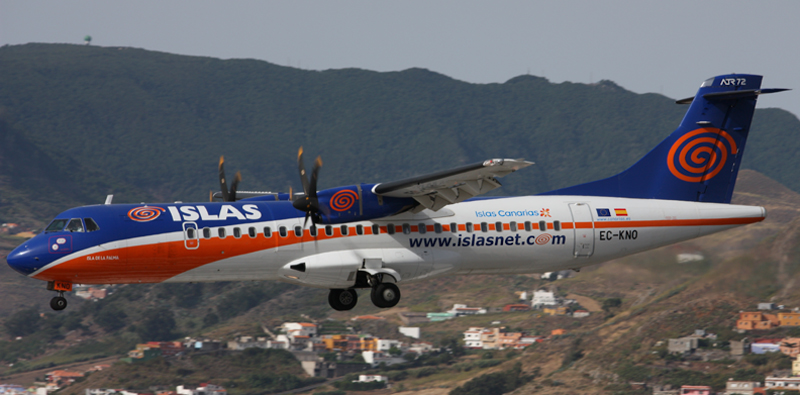
An Islas Airways ATR 72 upon landing at Tenerife North Airport (2009).

Islas Líneas Aéreas, operating as Islas Airways, was an airline based in Tenerife, Spain, offering scheduled inter-island services in the Canary Islands out of Tenerife North Airport. It was established in 2002 and started operations in February 2003.

Islas Airways suspended all flight operations on October 16, 2012. The Supreme Court confirmed, within an administrative proceeding for the reimbursement of the subsidy that the Ministry of Development itself had initiated, in 2018, the judgment of instance that obliged Islas Airways to return 7.5 million euros, those amounts had already been withheld by the ministry itself so that the Judgment no longer had economic effects.

== Destinations ==
Islas Airways operated scheduled services to the following destinations (as of 15 November 2011):

- Arrecife – Lanzarote Airport
- El Hierro – El Hierro Airport
- Fuerteventura – Fuerteventura Airport
- Las Palmas de Gran Canaria – Gran Canaria Airport hub
- Santa Cruz de la Palma – La Palma Airport
- Tenerife – Tenerife North Airport
