= Omar Pérez (Uruguayan footballer) =

Uruguayan footballer (born 1976)

Personal information
- Full name: Omar Mario Pérez Aguado
- Date of birth: 20 September 1976 (age 50)
- Place of birth: Montevideo, Uruguay
- Height: 1.75 m (5 ft 9 in)
- Position: Midfielder

Team information
- Current team: Oriental (assistant coach)

Senior career*
| Years | Team | Apps | (Gls) |
| 1994 | Central Español | | |
| 1994–1995 | Banfield | | |
| 1995–1998 | Central Español | | |
| 1998 | Aucas | | |
| 1999 | Villa Española | | |
| 2000 | Nacional | | |
| 2001 | Defensor Sporting | | |
| 2001 | Fénix | | |
| 2002 | Central Español | | |
| 2003 | River Plate Montevideo | | |
| 2004–2006 | Rostov | 65 | (11) |
| 2007 | Rampla Juniors | 23 | (7) |
| 2008–2009 | Peñarol | 32 | (1) |
| 2009–2010 | Castellón | 12 | (0) |
| 2010–2012 | Cerro | 41 | (8) |
| 2012–2013 | Fénix | 17 | (0) |
| 2014 | Boston River | 11 | (2) |
| 2014–2015 | Central Español | 21 | (2) |
| 2015 | Villa Teresa | 9 | (1) |

Managerial career
- 2020: Sud América
- 2023–: Oriental (assistant)
- * Club domestic league appearances and goals

Omar Mario Pérez Aguado (born 20 September 1976) is a Uruguayan professional football manager and a former player who played as a midfielder. He is an assistant manager with Oriental.

== Personal life ==
He is the oldest brother of Diego Pérez, nicknamed Ruso who played for the Uruguay national team.
