= Javier Iturriaga =

Spanish footballer (born 1983)

Personal information
- Full name: Javier Iturriaga Arrillaga
- Date of birth: 3 November 1983 (age 43)
- Place of birth: Mexico City, Mexico
- Height: 1.77 m (5 ft 9 1/2 in)
- Position: Midfielder

Youth career
- Getxo

Senior career*
Years	Team	Apps	(Gls)
2001–2002	Getxo		
2002–2004	Basconia	45	(3)
2004–2006	Bilbao Athletic	48	(4)
2006–2007	Athletic Bilbao	4	(0)
2007–2009	Salamanca	5	(0)
2008	→ Lorca Deportiva (loan)	11	(0)
2009	→ Lemona (loan)	13	(0)
2009–2012	Portugalete	?	(10)
2012–2015	Getxo	?	(4)
Total		126	(21)
- * Club domestic league appearances and goals

Javier Iturriaga Arrillaga (born 3 November 1983) is a Spanish former footballer who played as a midfielder.

== Early life ==
Unlike most of the players brought up at Athletic Bilbao, Iturriaga was not born in the Basque Country, or even in Spain. He was born and grew up in Mexico City, his family having moved to Mexico in the early 1980s from their native city of Zarautz after his father was relocated for business purposes to that Latin American country.

Iturriaga went to elementary school in Mexico, but at the age of 13 his family returned to Europe where he attended St Edmund's College in Ware, Hertfordshire. He showed his natural sporting talents there, quickly learning to play cricket and gaining a place in the Hertfordshire under-14 rugby county team, having played the game for only a few weeks; after high school he finally went back to Spain, where he became a regional junior champion in the racquet sport padel and began to play football with local CD Getxo while planning to study civil engineering.

== Club career ==
In 2002, aged 18, Iturriaga joined Athletic Bilbao following in the footsteps of his brother Iñigo, and meeting the criteria of the club's philosophy despite his birthplace by having developed as a footballer in the Basque region. He first appeared for the farm team, CD Basconia followed by the reserves, spending two seasons playing regularly with each squad.

Iturriaga was definitely promoted to the main squad for the 2006–07 campaign, but only appeared in four La Liga games as the side finished one place above relegation (17th). His debut came on 15 October 2006, as he came on as a substitute for Pablo Orbaiz in the 58th minute of the 3–2 away win against Gimnàstic de Tarragona; during his spell at the San Mamés Stadium, he was mainly restricted to Copa del Rey matches.

In the following summer, Iturriaga was released by Athletic and signed with Segunda División team UD Salamanca where he was also highly unsuccessful, going on to serve two loans in Segunda División B, including one at SD Lemona. In 2009, he left but stayed in the Biscay area, moving to amateurs Club Portugalete.

After three seasons in Tercera División, Iturriaga signed for Getxo where he had already spent his formative years.

== International career ==
Iturriaga declared he wished to represent Mexico internationally. Hugo Sánchez, the legendary striker who played in Spain for twelve years and was then in charge of the national team, stated that he would have him in consideration and follow his progress. However, the manager left his post to work with a club, and the player did not receive any call-ups.

== Personal life ==
Away from football, Iturriaga gained a master's degree in industrial engineering from the University of the Basque Country and became a professional in the field.
