= Pitu (footballer) =

Spanish footballer

Personal information
- Full name: Josep María Comadevall Crous
- Date of birth: 24 November 1983 (age 42)
- Place of birth: Salt, Spain
- Height: 1.71 m (5 ft 7 in)
- Position: Central midfielder

Youth career
- 1992–1996: Vilobí
- 1996–2002: Barcelona

Senior career*
Years	Team	Apps	(Gls)
2002–2005	Barcelona C	64	(8)
2005–2006	Barcelona B	19	(0)
2006–2007	Barcelona	1	(0)
2006–2007	→ Girona (loan)	38	(14)
2007–2009	Las Palmas	24	(1)
2008	→ Gavà (loan)	18	(1)
2009–2010	Badalona	17	(1)
2010–2012	Hospitalet	69	(8)
2012–2016	Llagostera	145	(22)
2016	Pune City	4	(0)
2017–2021	Llagostera	75	(14)
- * Club domestic league appearances and goals as of 19:01, 23 May 2022 (UTC)

Josep María Comadevall Crous (born 24 November 1983), known as Pitu, is a Spanish former footballer who played as a central midfielder.

== Club career ==
Born in Salt, Girona, Catalonia, Pitu emerged through local – and national – giants FC Barcelona's youth ranks, making his senior debut in the 2005–06 season with the reserves in the Segunda División B. On 20 May 2006 he played his first and only La Liga match, coming on as a substitute for Ludovic Giuly in the second half of a 3–1 loss against Athletic Bilbao at the San Mamés Stadium, as the Frank Rijkaard-led side had already been crowned league champions.

Subsequently, after one season with Barcelona neighbours Girona FC in the Tercera División, Pitu signed with Segunda División club UD Las Palmas, appearing sparingly for the Canary Islands team over the course of one and a half seasons. He spent the following five years in the third tier, returning to the second in 2014 after scoring eight goals in 40 games – play-offs included – for UE Llagostera.
