= Fernando Fajardo =

Uruguayan footballer (born 1975)

Personal information
- Full name: Fernando Jorge Fajardo Arias
- Date of birth: 3 June 1975 (age 51)
- Place of birth: Montevideo, Uruguay
- Height: 1.73 m (5 ft 8 in)
- Position: Defender

Team information
- Current team: Progreso

Youth career
- Defensor Sporting

Senior career*
Years	Team	Apps	(Gls)
1995–2000	Defensor Sporting	15	(2)
1996	→ DEFENSOR SPORTING (loan)	21	(0)
1998	→ DEFENSOR SPORTING (loan)	8	(2)
1999	→ Villa Española (loan)	25	(2)
1999	→ Nacional (loan)	4	(0)
2000	→ NACIONAL (loan)	12	(0)
2000–2001	Fénix	34	(7)
2001–2003	Peñarol	45	(0)
2003–2004	Fénix	17	(0)
2004–2006	Defensor Sporting	47	(1)
2006–2008	Elche	59	(4)
2008–2009	Celta	39	(2)
2009–2010	Albacete	?	(?)
2010–2011	Torrellano	?	(?)
2012	Defensor Sporting	4	(0)
2012–	Progreso		
- * Club domestic league appearances and goals as of 25 January 2012

Fernando Jorge Fajardo Arias (born June 3, 1975), commonly known as Fernando Fajardo, is a Uruguayan footballer who plays as a right defender for Club Atlético Progreso.
