= Roberto Platero =

Spanish footballer

Personal information
- Full name: Roberto Francisco Platero Ibáñez
- Date of birth: 31 December 1986 (age 39)
- Place of birth: Santoña, Spain
- Height: 1.72 m (5 ft 7 1/2 in)
- Position: Forward

Youth career
- Santoña
- 2002–2005: Racing Santander

Senior career*
Years	Team	Apps	(Gls)
2005–2008	Racing B	80	(39)
2007	Racing Santander	1	(0)
2008–2011	Numancia	0	(0)
2009	→ Ponferradina (loan)	7	(1)
2009–2010	→ Barakaldo (loan)	23	(4)
2010–2011	→ Poli Ejido (loan)	22	(3)
2011	Noja	3	(1)
2011–2012	Laredo	5	(1)
2012	Siete Villas	4	(0)
2012–2013	Gimnástica	16	(1)
2013–2014	Santoña	33	(17)
2014–2015	Gimnástica	12	(11)
2015–2016	Rayo Cantabria	20	(16)
2016–2018	Portugalete	17	(12)
2018–2020	Siete Villas	47	(11)
Total		290	(117)
- * Club domestic league appearances and goals

Roberto Francisco Platero Ibáñez (born 31 December 1986) is a Spanish former footballer who played as a forward.

== Club career ==
Platero was born in Santoña, Cantabria. A product of Racing de Santander's youth system, he spent several years mainly registered with their reserves, only appearing once for the first team: on 17 June 2007, in the season's closing round, he played 20 minutes in a 0–2 La Liga home loss against Real Betis.

Purchased by CD Numancia in the summer of 2008, Platero went on to serve three loans in his first three years, at SD Ponferradina (six months), Barakaldo CF and Polideportivo Ejido, with all the clubs from the Segunda División B. He competed solely in the lower leagues until his retirement.
