= Luis Lopez =

Luis Lopez or López may refer to:

== People ==
=== Arts and Entertainment ===
- Luis López (editor) (fl. 1637–1649), editor and publisher of Aragonese works in the Spanish language
- Luis López Piquer (1802–1865), Spanish painter
- Luis López Álvarez (born 1930), Spanish poet
- Luis López Nieves (born 1950), Puerto Rican author
- Luis López Carrasco (born 1981), Spanish writer and filmmaker

=== Politics and law ===
- Luis López Méndez (1758–1841), Venezuelan independence figure
- Luis López de la Torre Ayllón y Kirsmacker (1799–1875), Spanish nobleman and diplomat
- Luis Félix López (1932–2008), Ecuadorian doctor, politician and writer
- Luis López Guerra (born 1947), Spanish judge

=== Science and academia ===
- Luis López de Mesa (1884–1967), Colombian doctor and professor

=== Sports ===
==== Athletics ====
- Luis Fernando López (racewalker) (born 1979), Colombian race walker
- Luis López (sprinter) (born 1988), Puerto Rican sprinter and medalist at the 2010 Ibero-American Championships in Athletics
- Luis Ángel López (born 1991), Puerto Rican racewalker and medalist at the 2011 Central American and Caribbean Championships in Athletics
- Luis Lopez (Salvadoran racewalker) (born 1994), Salvadoran race walker

==== Baseball ====
- Luis Lopez (catcher) (born 1964), American baseball player
- Luis López (infielder) (born 1970), Puerto Rican baseball player
- Luis Lopez (third baseman) (born 1973), American baseball player

==== Cycling ====
- Luis López (cyclist), Uruguayan Olympic cyclist (1948)
- Luis Alfredo López (cyclist) (born 1966), Colombian road cyclist

==== Football ====
- Luis López (Chilean footballer) (1924–2012)
- Luis López (footballer, born 1951), Guatemalan football manager and former midfielder
- Luis López (football manager, born 1961), Uruguayan football manager
- Luis López Rekarte (born 1962), Spanish football right-back
- Luis López (footballer, born January 1975), Spanish football defender
- Luis López (footballer, born May 1975), Spanish football midfielder
- Luis López (footballer, born 1979) (born 1979), Argentine football midfielder
- Luis López (footballer, born 1983) (born 1983), Dominican football centre-back
- Luis López (footballer, born 1984) (born 1984), Uruguayan football goalkeeper
- Luis López (footballer, born 1986) (born 1986), Honduran football forward
- Luis López (footballer, born 1987) (born 1987), Argentine football forward
- Luis López (footballer, born 1992) (born 1992), Mexican football midfielder
- Luis López (footballer, born August 1993), Mexican football centre-back
- Luis López (footballer, born September 1993), Honduran football goalkeeper
- Luis López (Nicaraguan footballer) (born 1998)
- Luis López (footballer, born 1999), Mexican football goalkeeper
- Luis López (footballer, born 2001), Spanish footballer

==== Other sports ====
- Luis López (sailor) (born 1955), Spanish Olympic sailor
- Luis López (gymnast) (1969–1995), Mexican Olympic gymnast

== Places ==
- Luis Lopez, New Mexico, United States

== Fictional ==
- Luis Lopez-Fitzgerald, fictional character on soap opera Passions
- Luis Fernando Lopez, protagonist of Grand Theft Auto: The Ballad of Gay Tony

== See also ==
- José Luis López (disambiguation)
- Lluís López (born 1997), Spanish footballer
- Luís Lopes (born 2000), Portuguese footballer
