= Checo =

Checo may refer to:

== People ==
- Checo (footballer) (born 2004), Spanish footballer
- Checo Acosta (born 1965), Colombian folk singer
- Luis Manuel López Checo (born 1983), Dominican footballer
- Robinson Checo (born 1971), Dominican baseball pitcher
- Sergio Pérez (born 1990), Mexican racing driver, nicknamed Checo

== Other uses ==
- Czechoslovakia, sometimes spelt Checo-Slovakia
- BG Checo International Ltd v British Columbia Hydro and Power Authority
- Project CHECO (Contemporary Historical Examination of Current Operations), Viet Nam War era project by the United States Air Force to record history of air operations
