= Spanish mystic =

Early modern Catholic mystics

The Spanish mystics are major figures in the Catholic Reformation who lived primarily in the 16th and 17th centuries. The goal of this movement was to reform the Church structurally and to renew it spiritually. The Spanish mystics attempted to express in words their experience of a mystical communion with Christ.

== Language and writing style ==
These writers had a strong influence on the development of the Spanish Language and form part of the "Golden Age of Spanish Literature."

In addition to being examples of Christian holiness and major Spanish literary figures, the Spanish Mystics were also real reformers in the Church. Their writings inspired a religious quest for God based on desire rather than obligation and medieval legalism, and three of them went on to found or reform religious orders that would carry on their work across continents and centuries.

== Principal figures and their major writings ==
- Teresa de Cartagena (writer)

- Grove of the Infirm
- Wonder at the Works of God

- St. Teresa of Ávila, OCD

- The Interior Castle
- The Way of Perfection

- St. John of the Cross, OCD (poet)

- Dark Night of the Soul
- Ascent of Mount Carmel

- St. Ignatius of Loyola, SJ

- The Spiritual Exercises
- Autobiography

- St. Francis de Borja, SJ
- Luis de León, OESA (poet)
- Venerable Mary of Jesus of Ágreda, OIC (writer)

- Mystical City of God

- Fernando de Herrera (poet)
- Blessed Ramon Lull, TOSF (philosopher of the 14th century)

== Other Spanish mystics ==
- Gertrudis Anglesola
- Bernardo de Hoyos
- María Rafols Bruna
