= José Luis López =

José Luis López may refer to:

- José Luis López Aranguren (1909–1996), Spanish philosopher
- José Luis López Rubio or José López Rubio (1903–1996), Spanish film writer and director
- José Luis López Vázquez (1922–2009), Spanish film and TV actor
- José Luis López de Lacalle (1938–2000), Spanish journalist and trade unionist
- José Luis López (Costa Rican footballer), Costa Rican footballer
- José Luis López (Mexican footballer) (born 1979), Mexican footballer
- José Luis López (boxer) (born 1973), Mexican boxer
- José Luis López (handballer) (born 1998), Chilean handball player

== See also ==
- José López (disambiguation)
- Luis Lopez (disambiguation)
