= Our Lady of the Pillar =

Title of the Virgin Mary

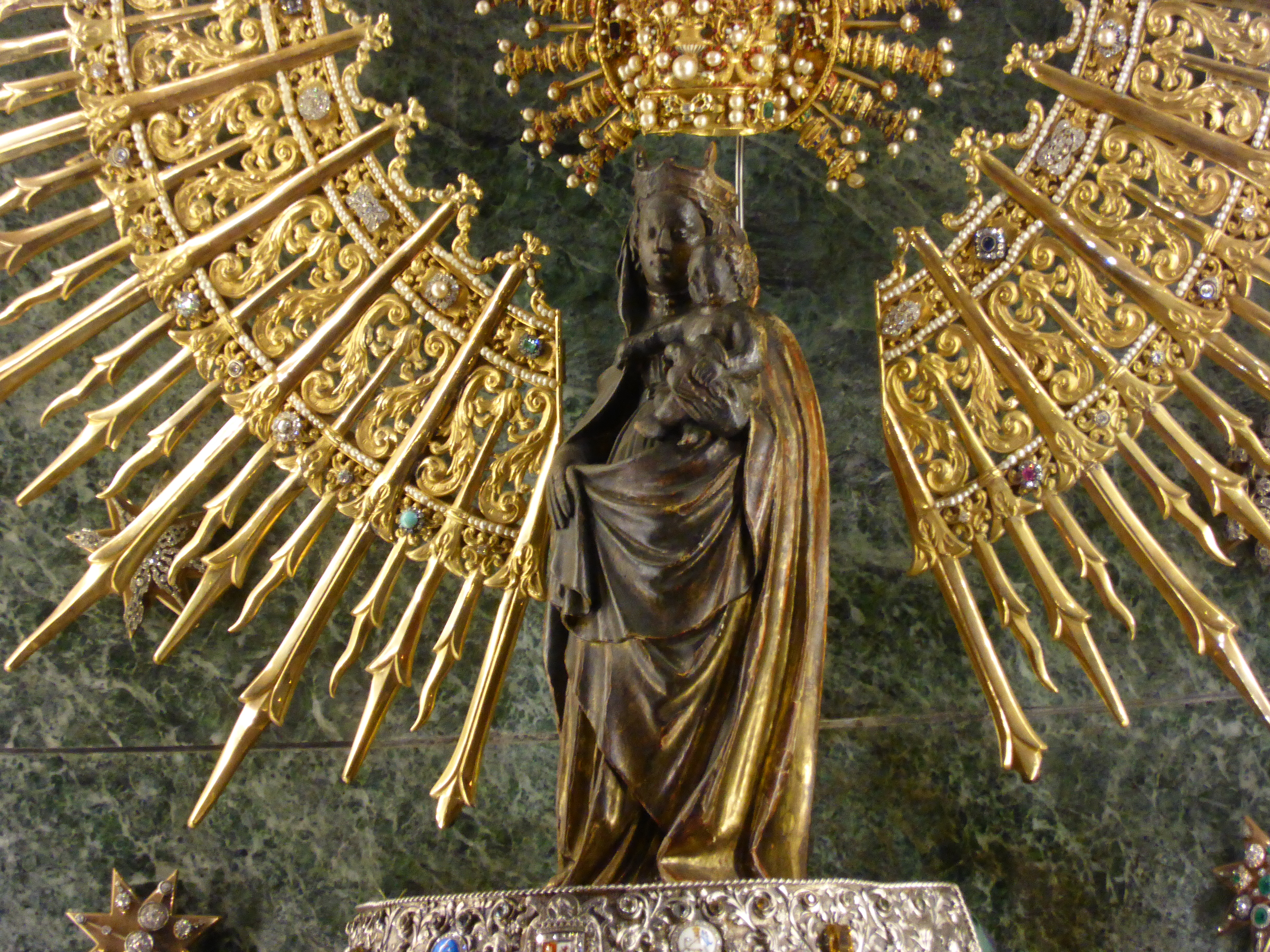
- The image of Our Lady of the Pillar wearing her canonical crown
- Location: Zaragoza, Spain
- Date: 12 October AD 40 (traditional)
- Witness: Apostle James the Greater
- Type: Marian Apparition
- Approval: Pope Callixtus III (1456); Pope Innocent XIII (1723); Pope Pius X (1905)
- Venerated in: Catholic Church
- Shrine: Basilica of Our Lady of the Pilar, Zaragoza, Spain
- Patronage: Zaragoza, Spain, Spanish Civil Guard, Melo, Uruguay, Buenos Aires, Argentina, Diocese of Imus, Cavite, Zamboanga City, Santa Cruz, Manila, Alaminos, Laguna, San Simon, Pampanga, Libmanan, Camarines Sur, Pilar and Morong in Bataan, Mamburao, Occidental Mindoro, Sibonga, Cebu, Baleno, Masbate, Cauayan, Isabela, Hispanic people and the Hispanic world.
- Attributes: The Virgin Mary carrying the Child Jesus atop a Pillar, surrounded by two or more angels

Our Lady of the Pillar (Spanish: Nuestra Señora del Pilar) is the name given to the Virgin Mary in the context of the traditional belief that Mary, while living in Jerusalem, supernaturally appeared to the Apostle James the Greater in AD 40 while he was preaching in what is now Spain. Those who adhere to this belief consider this appearance to be the only recorded instance of Mary exhibiting the mystical phenomenon of bilocation. Among Catholics, it is also considered the first Marian apparition, and unique because it happened while Mary was still living on Earth.

This title is also associated with a wooden image commemorating the apparition, which is now enshrined at the Cathedral-Basilica of Our Lady of the Pillar in Zaragoza, Aragon, Spain. Pope Callixtus III granted indulgences for visitors to the shrine in 1456. Pope Innocent XIII in 1730 mandated her veneration throughout the Spanish Empire. On 20 May 1905, Pope Pius X granted the image a canonical coronation.

Our Lady of the Pillar is considered the Patroness of Aragon and its capital Zaragoza, Hispanic people, the Hispanic world, and of the Spanish Civil Guard. Her feast day is 12 October, which coincides with the National Day of Spain.

== History ==
=== Early tradition ===
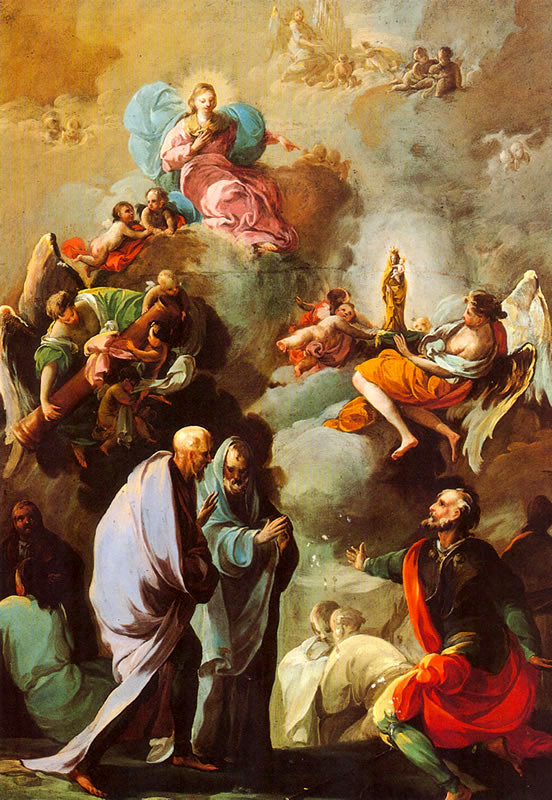
Apparition of the Virgin of the Pillar to Saint James and his Saragossan disciples by Francisco Goya, c. 1769

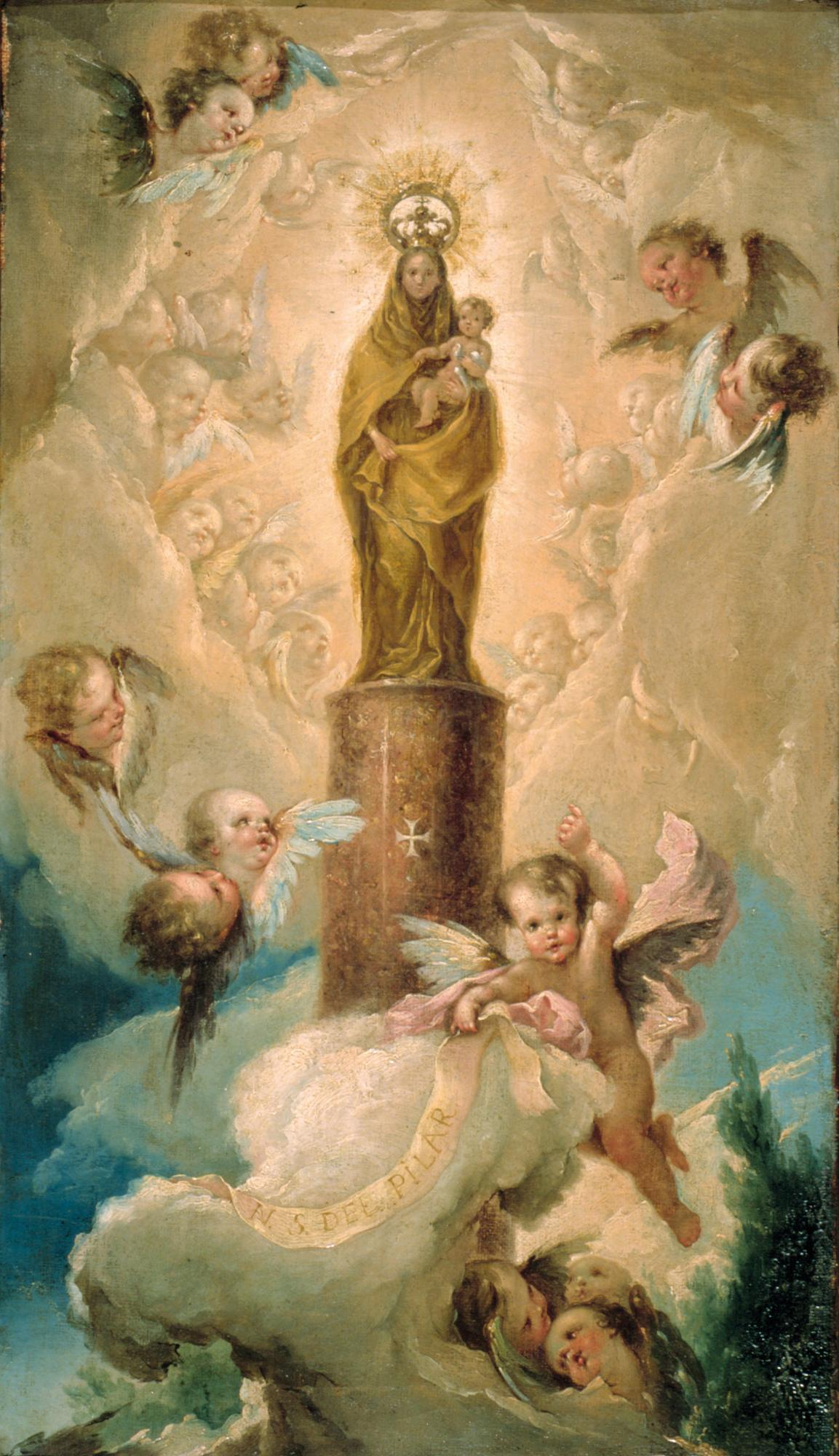
Our Lady of the Pillar by Ramón Bayeu, 1780

Catholic tradition holds that, in the early days of Christianity, the Apostles of Jesus spread the Gospel throughout the known world, with James the Greater evangelizing in Roman Hispania (modern-day Spain). He confronted great difficulties in his missionary efforts and faced severe discouragement. In AD 40, while he was praying by the banks of the Ebro at Caesaraugusta (Zaragoza), Mary bilocated from Jerusalem, where she was living at the time, and appeared to James, accompanied by thousands of angels, to console and encourage him.

Some of the earliest archaeological evidence of Marian devotion in Zaragoza is found in Christian tombs dating from the Roman period, which appear to bear images representing the Assumption of the Blessed Virgin. In the 4th century, the presence of votive images placed on columns or pillars is attested. The oldest written testimony of devotion to the Virgin Mary in Zaragoza is usually identified as that of Pedro Librana in 1155. There is evidence that the site attracted pilgrims from across the Iberian Peninsula during the 13th century, e.g. reflected in the work Milagros de Nuestra Señora by Gonzalo de Berceo, dated to the 1250s or early 1260s. The appellation Santa María del Pilar is attested for 1299. The claim that the first church had been the oldest in Hispania, built in AD 40 by James the Greater, is first recorded in 1318.

A book by Michael O'Neil (2015) called Exploring the Miraculous indicates that there are various traditions about earliest approvals by the church of this Marian apparition. From his book:

"For example, one of the great pilgrimage sites in Spain, Our Lady of the Pillar in Zaragoza, originating in a miracle and housing an ancient jasper Marian image on a column, did not always recognize Our Lady under this title. According to the legend relating to the apostle St. James the Greater and his travels in Spain, on January 2 in the year 40, he was disheartened with his lack of success in proclaiming the gospel in Caesaraugusta (present-day Zaragoza) by the river Ebro, when he saw Mary (still alive at the time) miraculously appear on a pillar, comforting him and calling him to return to Jerusalem. The first written mention of the Virgin of Zaragoza comes from a bishop in the middle of the twelfth century, and Zaragoza's co-cathedral's name did not originally include a reference to El Pilar, being called Santa Maria Mayor. In 1296, Pope Boniface VIII conferred an indulgence on pilgrims visiting this shrine but still without mention of Our Lady of the Pillar. One of the legal councils of Zaragoza first wrote about Our Lady under this title in 1299, promising safety and privileges to pilgrims who came to visit the shrine. In 1456, Pope Calixtus III issued a bull encouraging pilgrimage to Our Lady of the Pillar and confirming the name and the miraculous origin. So, despite the lack of early extant texts about the miracle story and the name of this devotion, the enduring tradition delivers the story to us today."

In other interpretations, the tradition of the Marian apparition can be traced to the 15th century: In either 1434 or 1435, a fire destroyed the alabaster altarpiece. The replacement altarpiece features bas-relief representations of the Marian apparition. The image of the Virgen del Pilar venerated today also dates to this period. It executed in the late Gothic style of Juan de la Huerta.

Pope Calixtus III in a bull issued on 23 September 1456 declares a seven-year indulgence for those who visit Our Lady of Saragossa. The text of the bull specifically mentions a pillar, for the first time suggesting the existence of an image known as Our Lady of the Pillar. The feast day of 12 October was officially introduced by the Council of Zaragoza in 1640.

According to the account by María de Ágreda (d. 1665) in her Mystical City of God, Mary, mother of Jesus, was transported from Jerusalem to Hispania during the night, on a cloud carried by angels. During the journey, the angels also built a pillar of marble, and a miniature image of Mary with the Child Jesus.

=== Approval ===
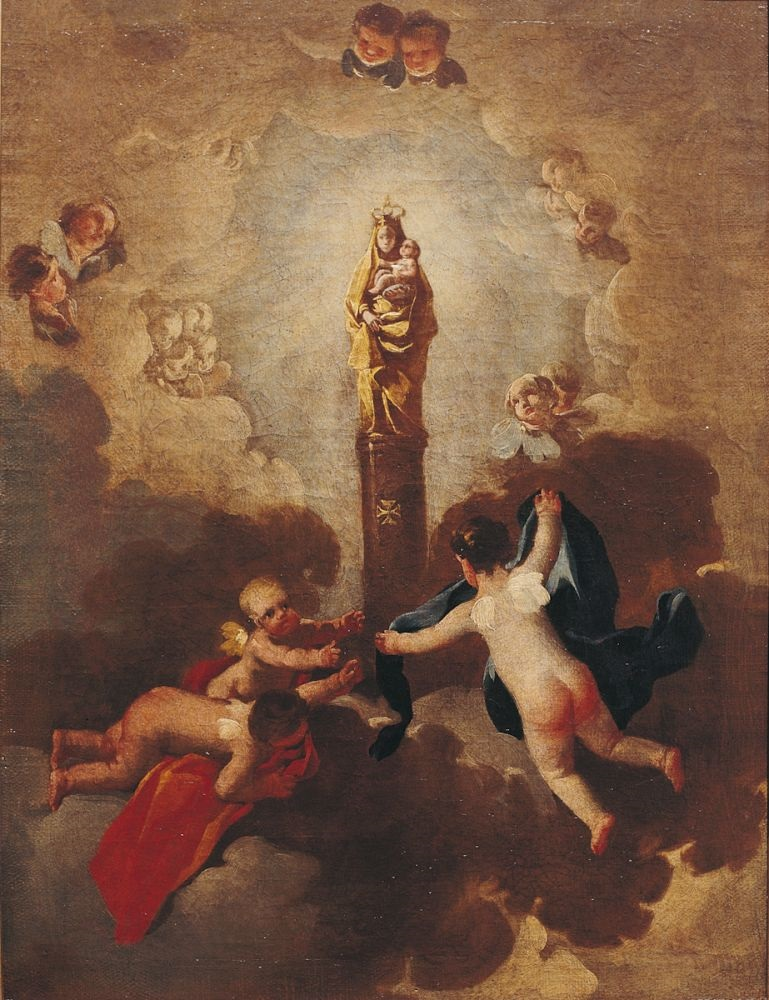
The work represents the Virgen del Pilar, patroness of Spain.

The apparition of Our Lady of the Pillar was accepted as canonical by Pope Innocent XIII in 1723. So many contradictions had arisen concerning the miraculous origin of the church that Spain appealed to Innocent XIII to settle the controversy. After careful investigation, the twelve cardinals, in whose hands the affair rested, adopted the following account, which was approved by the Sacred Congregation of Rites on 7 August 1723, and later inserted in the lessons of the office of the feast of our Lady of the Pillar, celebrated on 12 October:

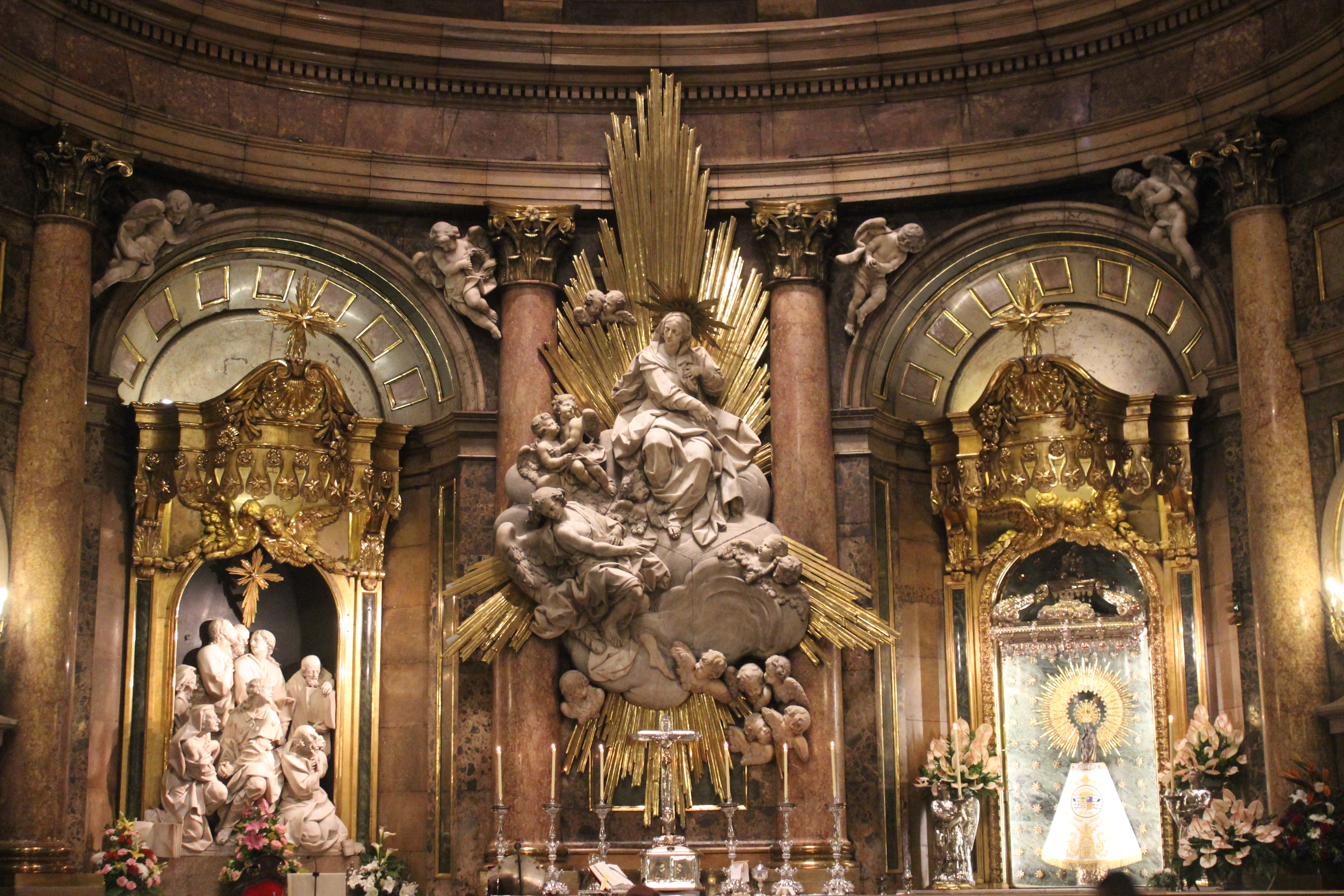
Holy Chapel of the Pilar of Zaragoza. Altar with the Coming of the Virgin by José Ramírez de Arellano.

Of all the places that Spain offers for the veneration of the devout, the most illustrious is doubtless the sanctuary consecrated to God under the invocation of the Blessed Virgin, under the title of our Lady of the Pillar, at Saragossa. According to ancient and pious tradition, St. James the Greater, led by Providence into Spain, spent some time at Saragossa. He there received a signal favour from the Blessed Virgin. As he was praying with his disciples one night, upon the banks of the Ebro, as the same tradition informs us, the Mother of God, who still lived, appeared to him, and commanded him to erect an oratory in that place. The apostle delayed not to obey this injunction, and with the assistance of his disciples soon constructed a small chapel. In the course of time a larger church was built and dedicated, which, with the dedication of Saint Saviour's, is kept as a festival in the city and Diocese of Saragossa on 4 October.

James returned to Jerusalem with some of his disciples where he became a martyr, beheaded in AD 44 during the reign of Herod Agrippa. His disciples allegedly returned his body to Spain. The year AD 40 is the earliest recognised Marian apparition in the Catholic Church, dating to a time when Mary, the mother of Jesus, was still alive.

Pope Clement XII allowed the celebration of the feast of Our Lady of the Pillar all over the Spanish Empire in 1730. Since the feast day (12 October) coincides with the discovery of the Americas (12 October 1492), Mary was later named as Patroness of the Hispanic World under this title.

== Image ==
=== Zaragoza ===
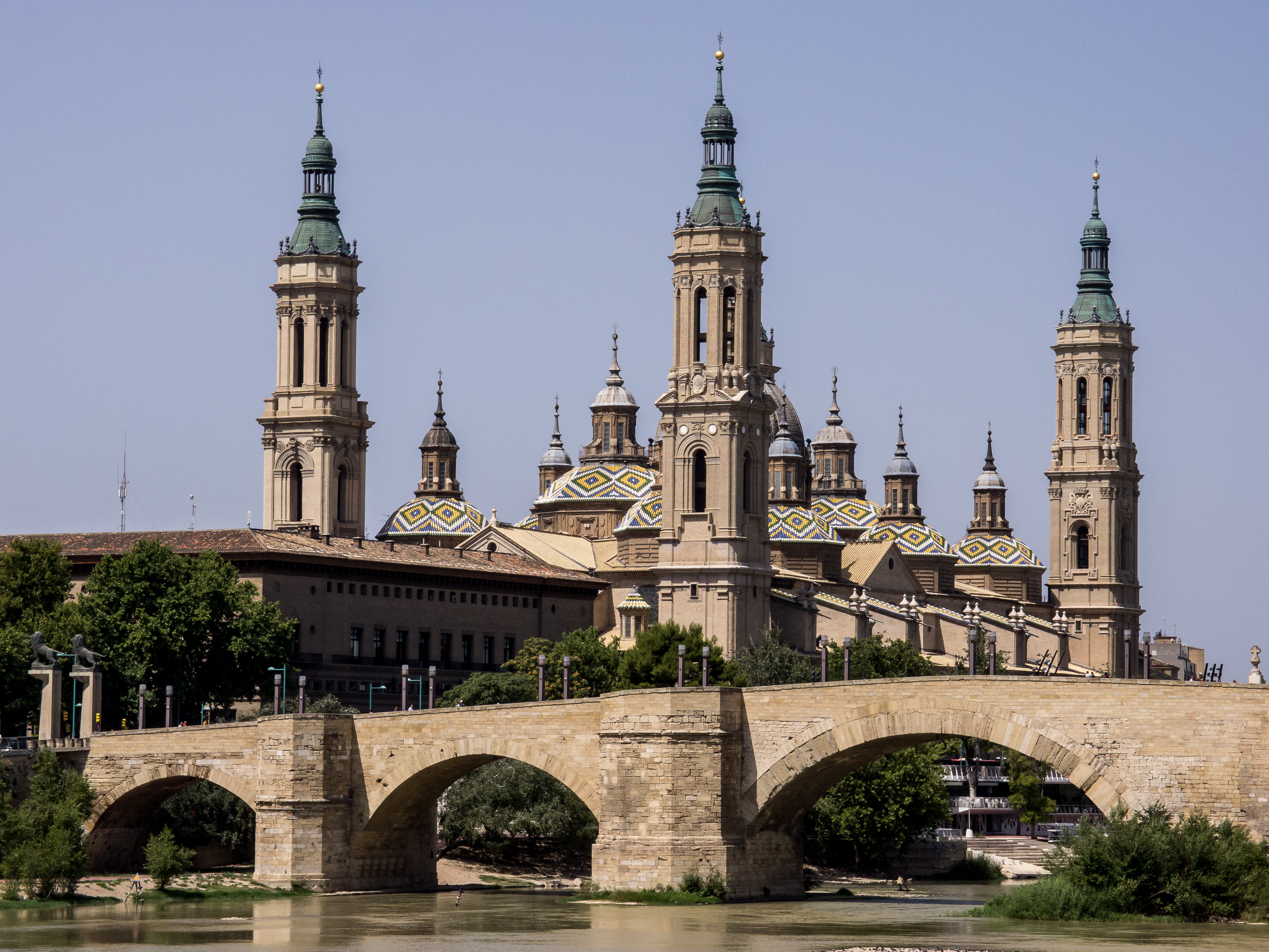
View of the basilica as seen across the River Ebro, looking west, with the Puente de Piedra in the foreground

A fire in 1434 burned down the church that preceded the present basilica. The construction of the present Basilica of Our Lady of the Pillar, Zaragoza was started in 1681 and ended in 1711.

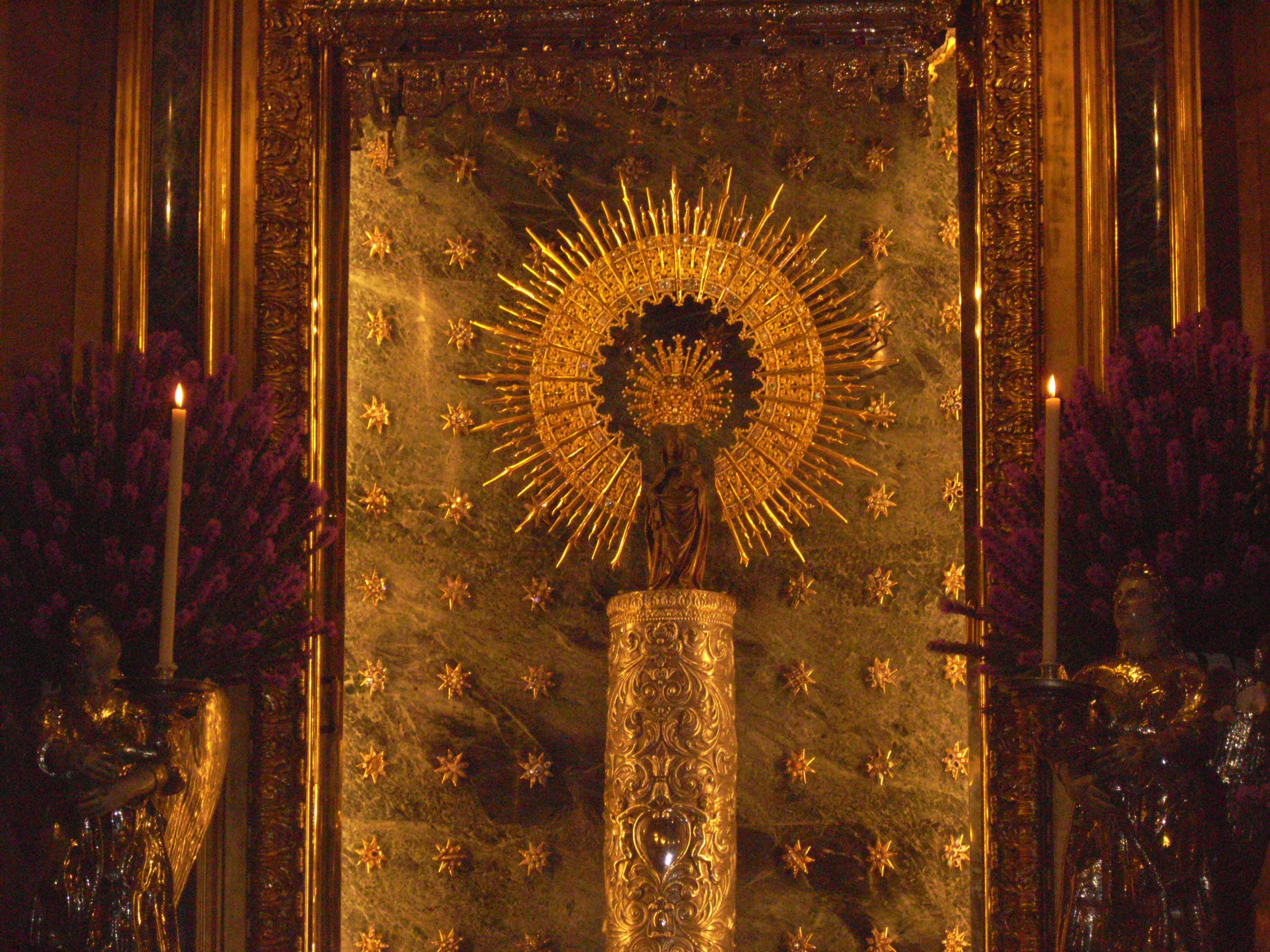
The wooden image and pillar without the mantle (photograph taken on 2 April 2011; the image is displayed without mantle on the 2nd, 12th and 20th day of each month)

The wooden statue of the Virgin Mary is in the Late Gothic style. It stands 36.5 centimetres (14.4 in) tall, on a pillar of jasper with a height of 1.8 metres (5.9 ft). The statue depicts Mary with the Child Jesus on her left arm, who has a dove sitting on his left palm.

Some reports state that an earlier wooden image was destroyed when the church burned down in 1434, consistent with an attribution of the current image to Juan de la Huerta (d. 1462) or his school.

It appears that folk belief in some cases may be inclined to regard the Saragossa image as miraculous, sculptured by the angels as they transported Mary from Jerusalem to Saragossa (Zaragoza); this mystical tradition goes back to María de Ágreda (d. 1665), herself the object of frequent "mystical bilocation" (i.e. she reported that she was often "transported by the aid of the angels" ), who gave an account to this effect in her Mystical City of God; however, unlike the tradition of the Marian apparition itself, the miraculous origin of the image is not part of the tradition recognized by the Holy See as canonical.

Since the 16th century, the pillar is usually draped in a skirt-like cover called manto "mantle". As a whole, it is protected by a bronze case and then another case of silver. The image was canonically crowned in 1905 during the reign of Pope Pius X. The crown was designed by the Marquis of Griñi, valued at 450,000 pesetas (c. US$2.6 million as of 2017).

=== Other depictions ===
Our Lady of the Pillar is a common motif of the Madonna and Child in Spanish art; extant examples other than the Saragossa image date from the Renaissance period onward. Depictions become especially numerous following the introduction of the feast day throughout the Spanish Empire in 1730.

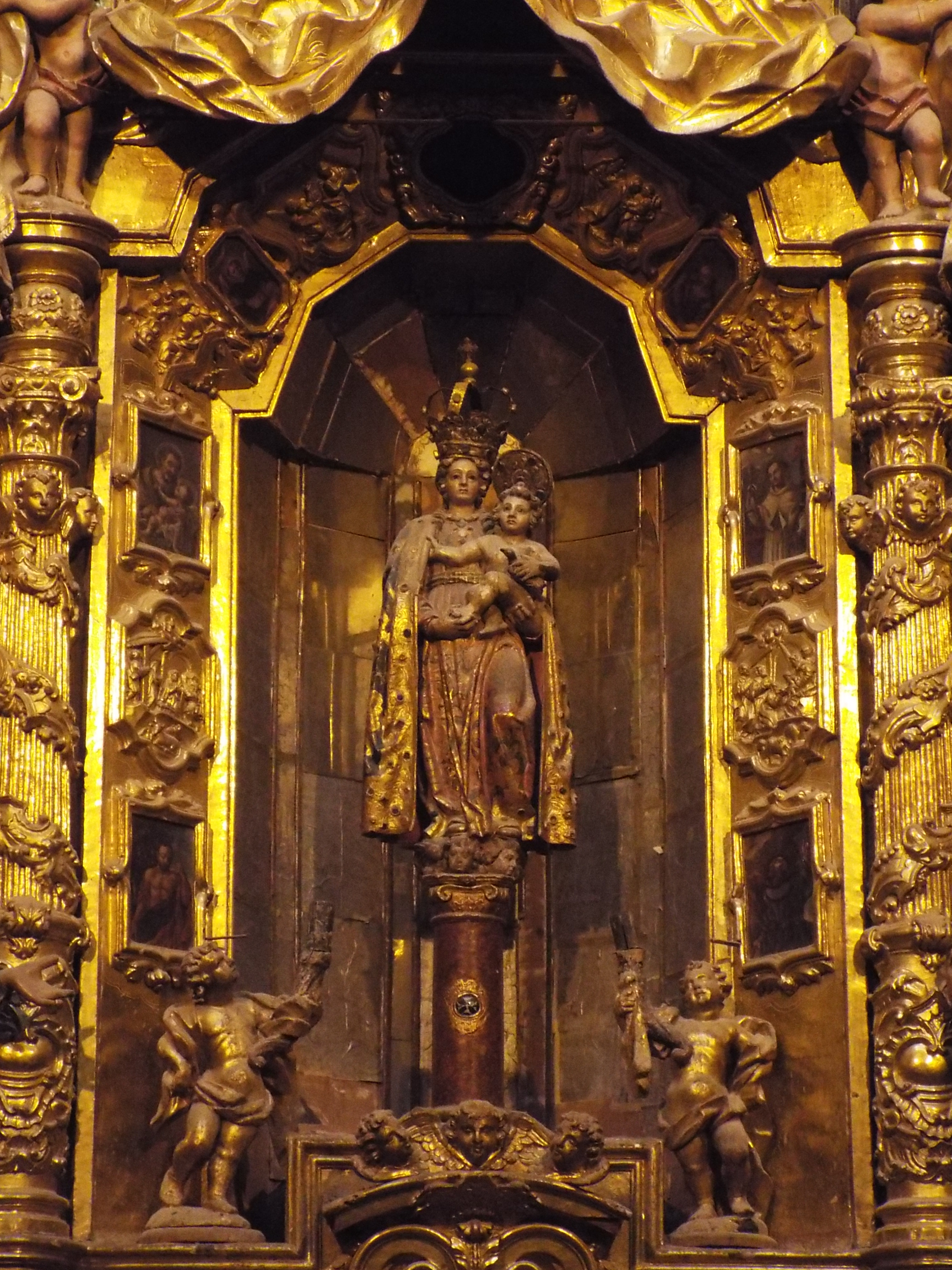
Statue of Our Lady of the Pillar by Cosme Damián Bas (c. 1570), part of the main altarpiece of Albarracín Cathedral

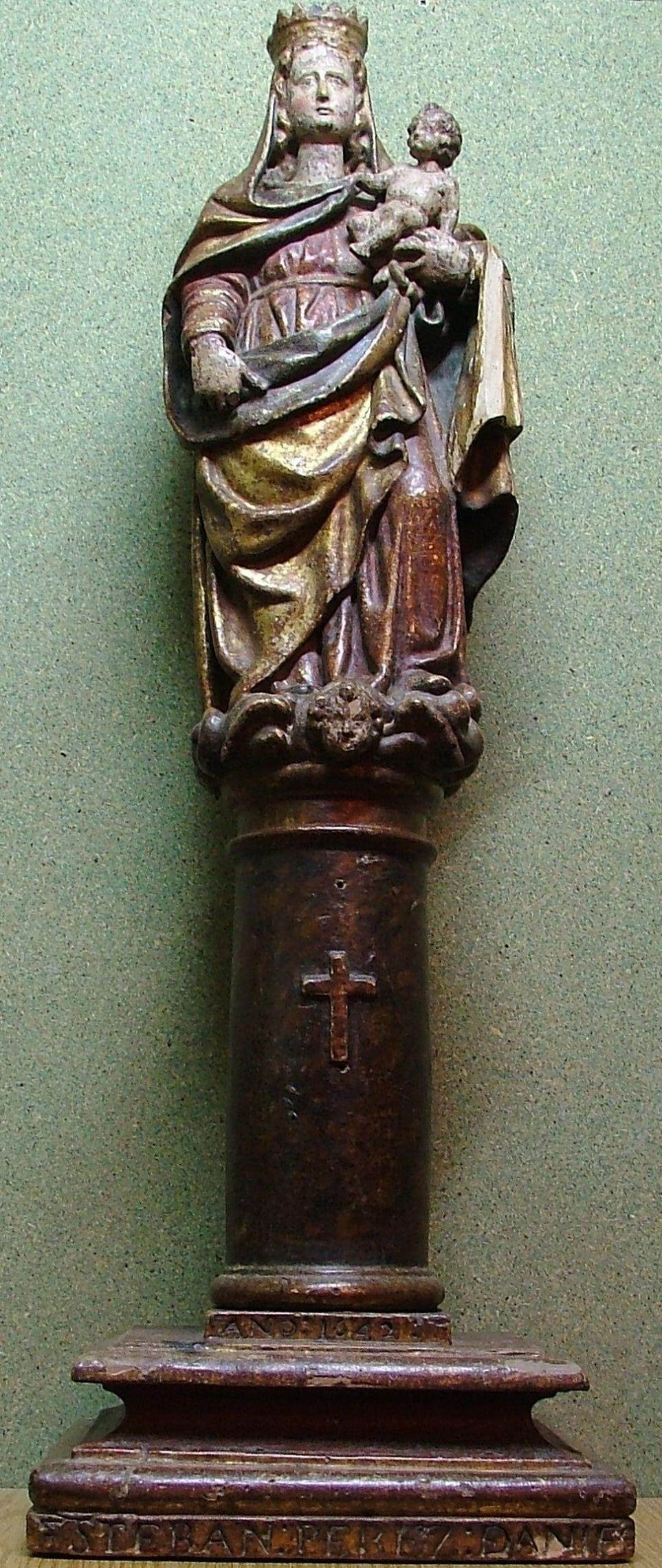
Baroque-era statue of Our Lady of the Pillar, by "Esteban Pérez de Anies", dated 1642

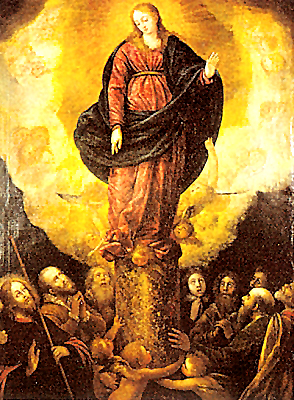
Painting of Our Lady of the Pillar, by Francisco Jiménez Maza (1655)

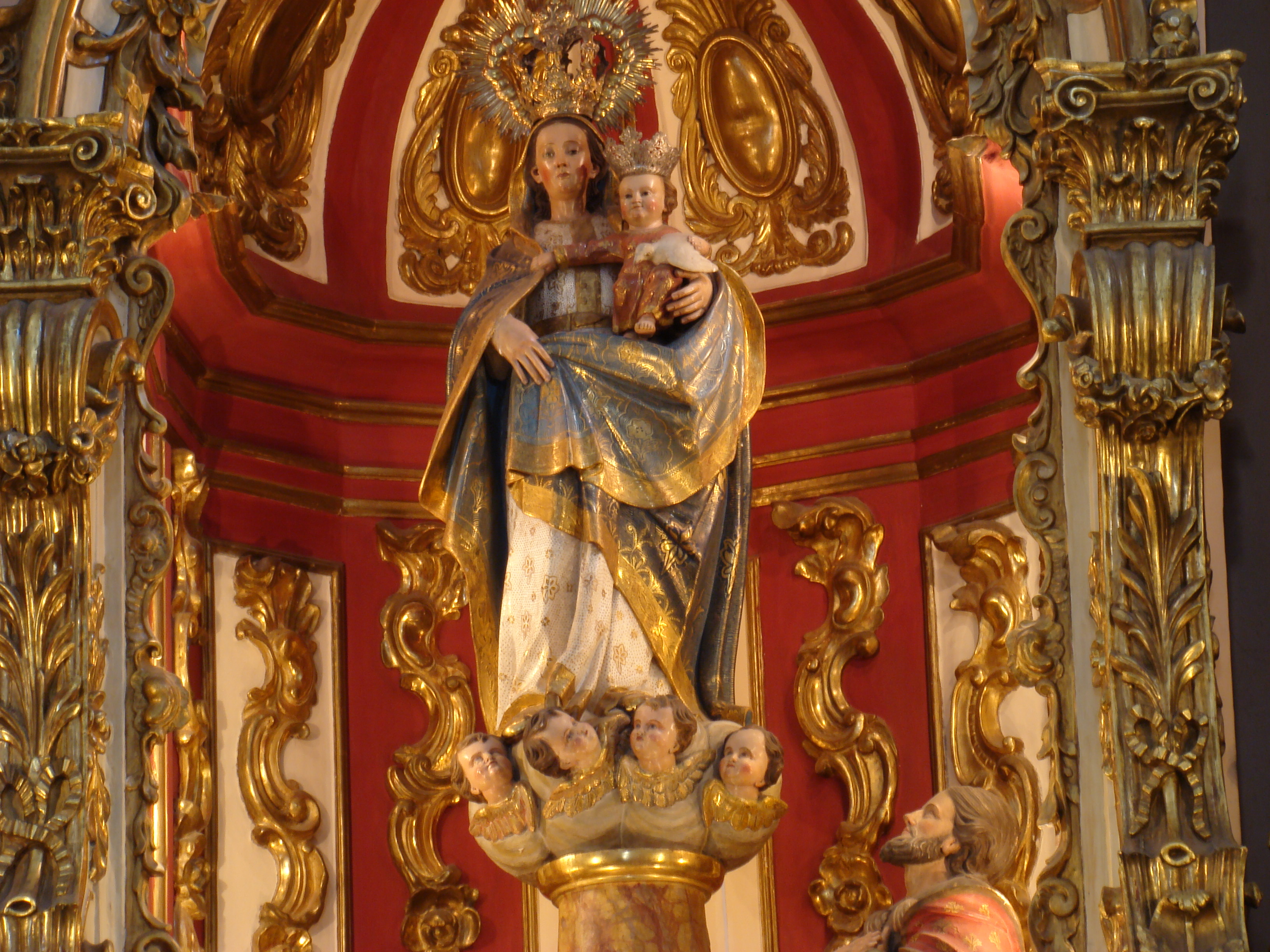
Statue of Our Lady of the Pillar, part of the main altarpiece of the Basílica Nuestra Señora del Pilar in Buenos Aires (1732)

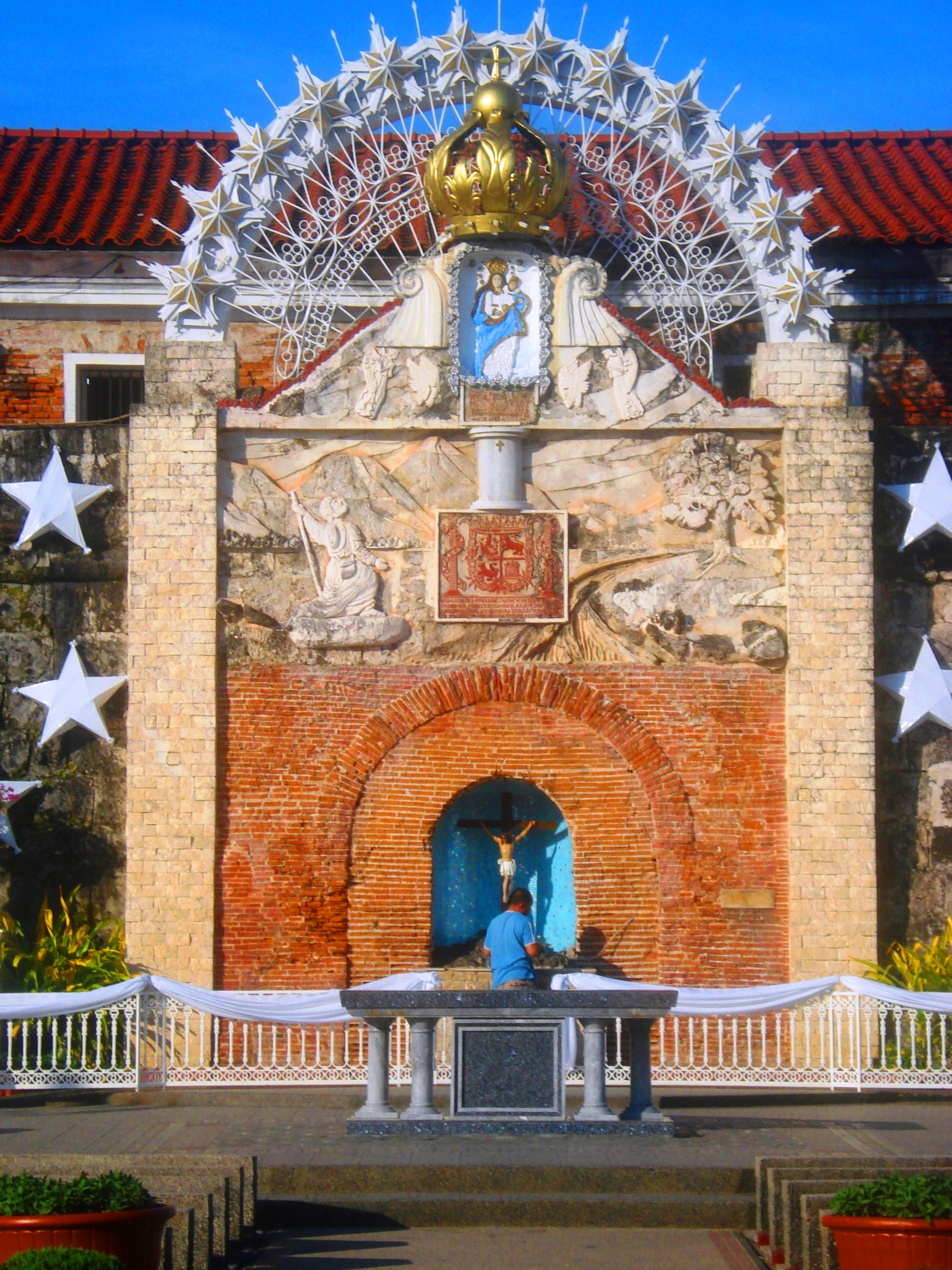
The shrine of Our Lady of the Pillar in Fort Pilar Zamboanga City, Philippines (1734)

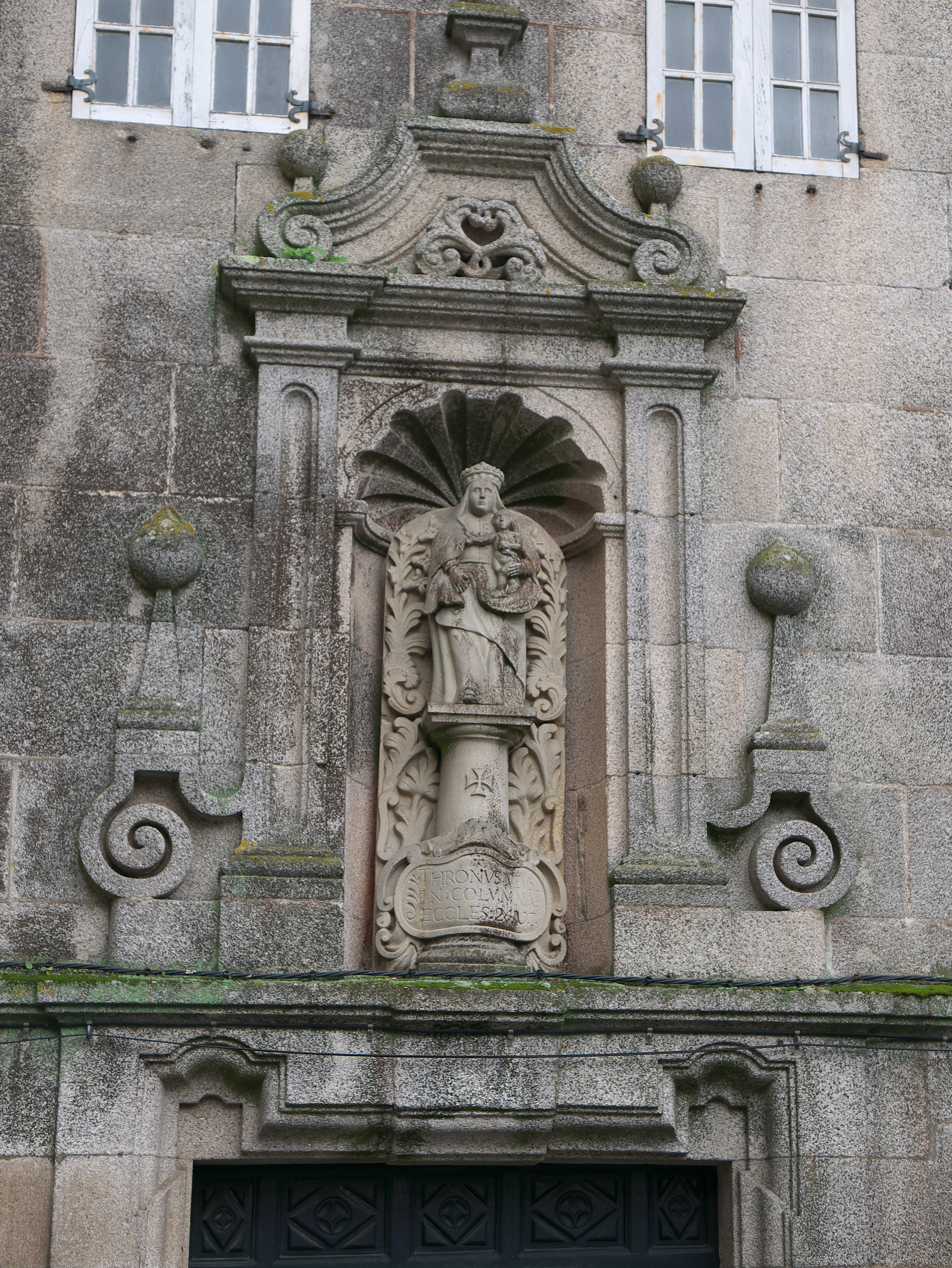
Sculpture of Our Lady of the Pillar (1752) above the entrance to the Hospital de Pobres y Peregrinos in Tui, Pontevedra

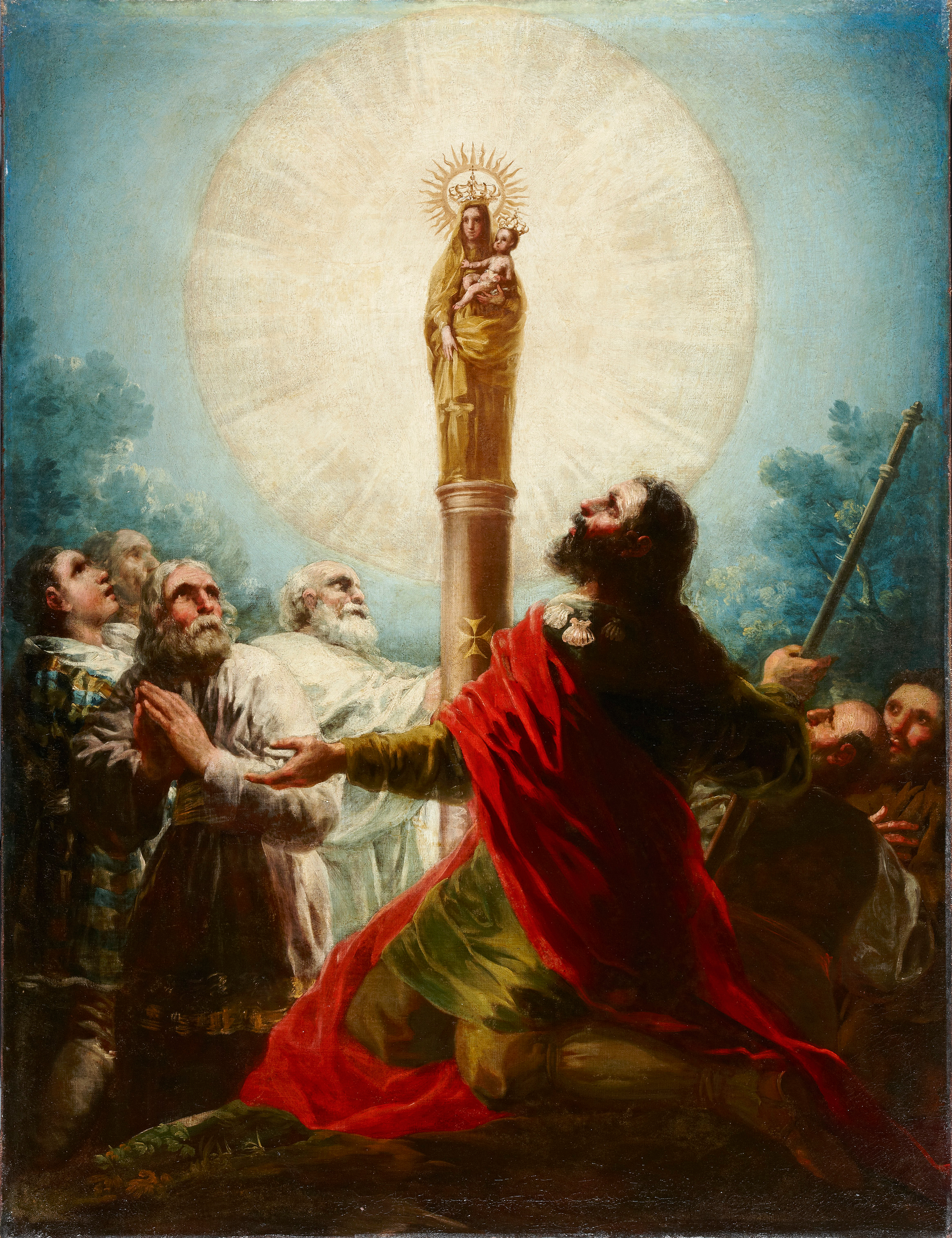
St. James and his disciples venerating Our Lady of the Pillar, painting by Goya (c. 1775–1780)

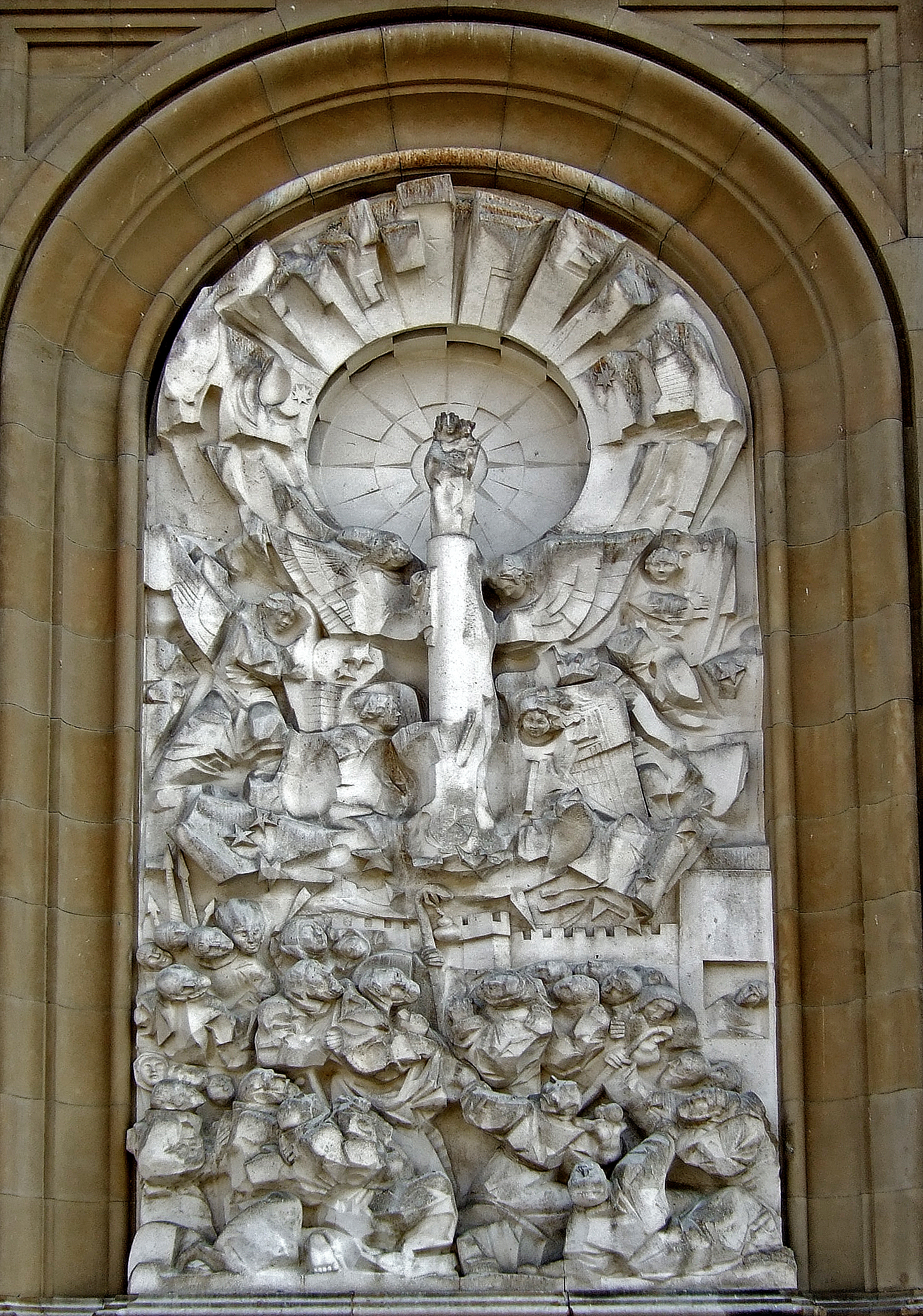
Zaragoza - the Pillar - Relief of the Virgin of Pablo Serrano

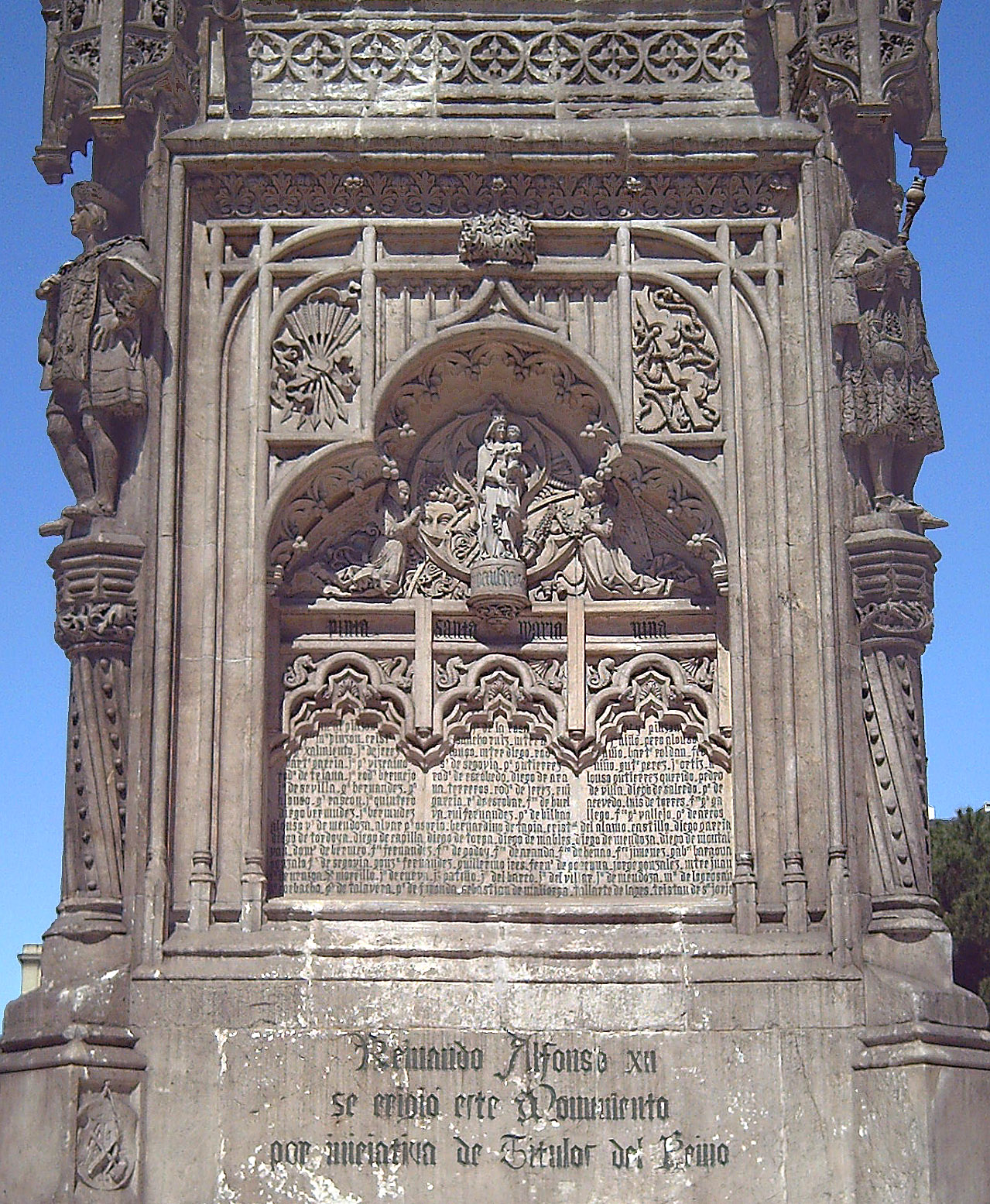
Relief of Our Lady of the Pillar on the monument to Christopher Columbus in Columbus Square (Madrid, Spain), completed in 1885

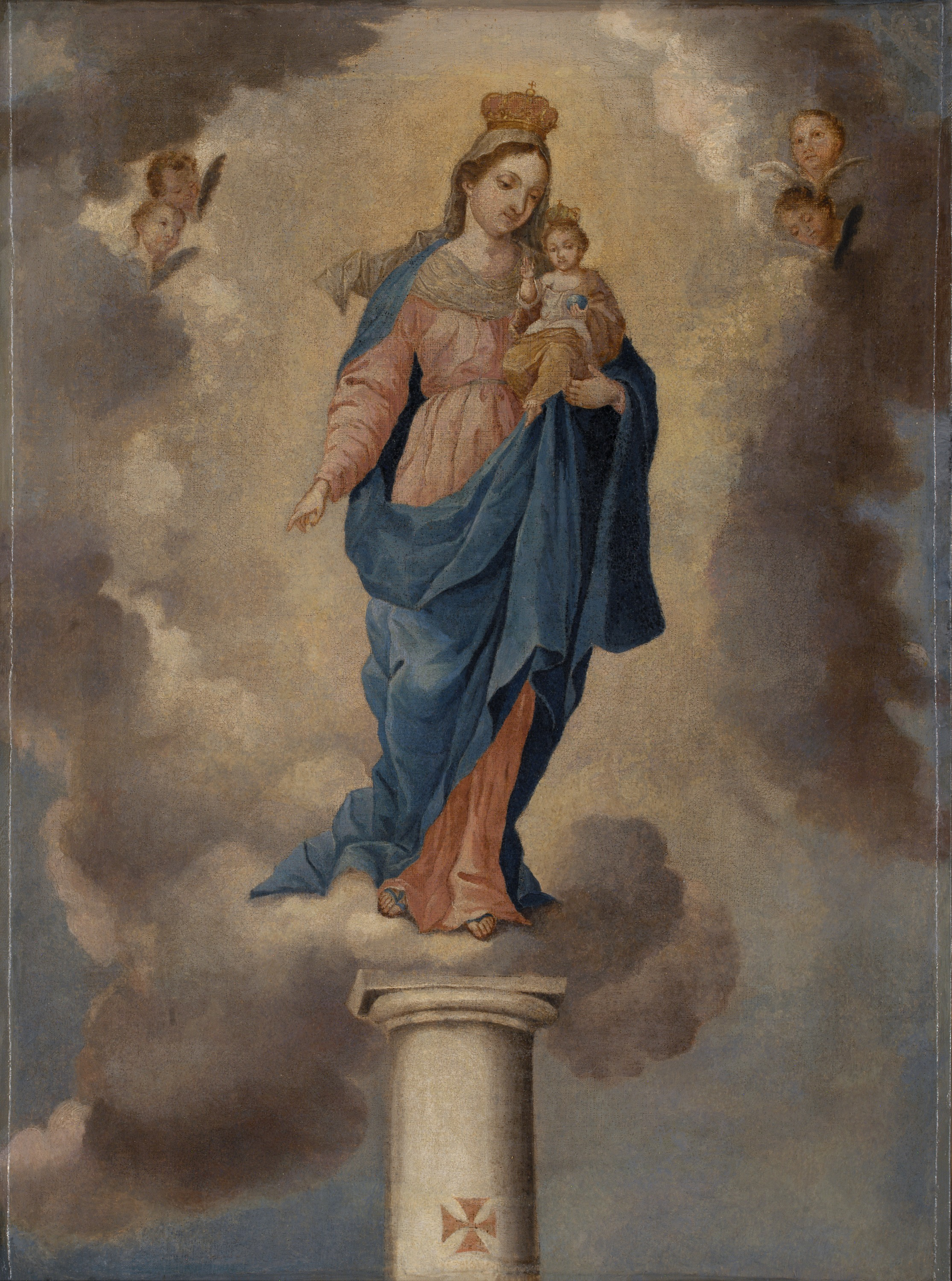
La Virgen del pilar (Late 18th century), Puerto Rico

== Feast day ==
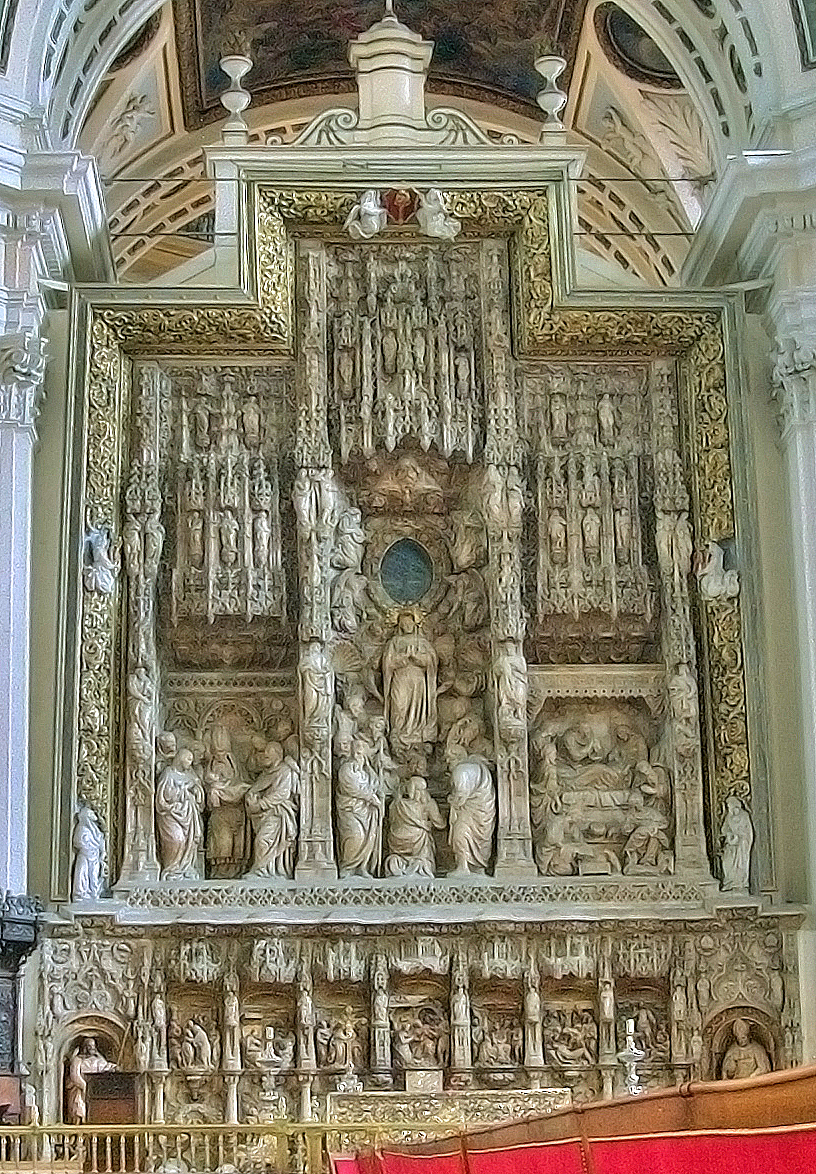
Altarpiece of the Assumption of the main altar of the Basilica of Our Lady of Pilar de Zaragoza (Spain)

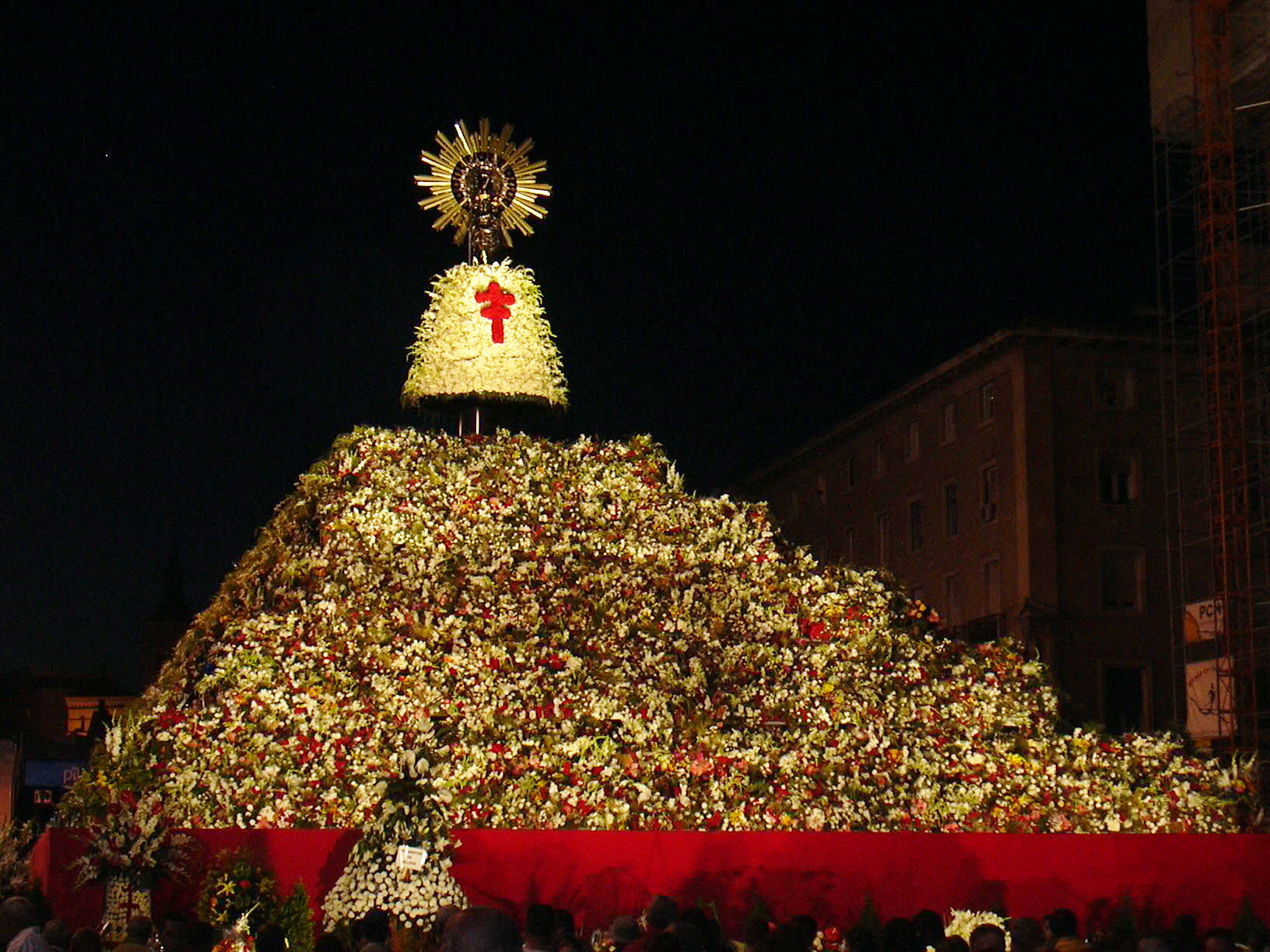
Floral offering to Our Lady of the Pillar

The feast of Our Lady of the Pillar is celebrated on 12 October and she is the Patroness of the Hispanic peoples and the Spanish Civil Guard. A grand nine-day festival known as Fiestas del Pilar is celebrated in Saragossa (Zaragoza) every year in her honour. The modern Fiestas del Pilar, as they developed since the 19th century, begin on the weekend preceding 12 October and they end on the Sunday after 12 October (i.e. they move between 5–13 and 11–19 October). They were declared as a "national holiday of touristic interest" (Fiesta de Interés Turístico Nacional) by the Ministerio de Comercio y Turismo in 1980.

As 12 October coincides with the day of the year 1492 when land was first sighted on Columbus's First Voyage, the Fiesta de la Raza Española, first proposed in 1913 by Faustino Rodríguez-San Pedro y Díaz-Argüelles to fall on the same date. In the United States, this was later called "Columbus Day", as Columbus tends to be more associated with Italy and Italian-Americans, rather than the Spanish and Latin America in the U.S. The Fiesta de la Raza Española was declared the national holiday of Spain in a decree by Antonio Maura and King Alfonso XIII of 1918. The alternative name Día de la Hispanidad was proposed in the late 1920s by Ramiro de Maeztu, based on a suggestion by Zacarías de Vizcarra. After the Civil War, on 12 October 1939, the Día de la Raza was celebrated in Saragossa (Zaragoza), presided over by Francisco Franco, with a special devotion to the Virgen del Pilar. Chilean foreign vice-secretary Germán Vergara Donoso commented that the "profound significance of the celebration was the intimate inter-penetration of the homage to the Race and the devotion to Our Lady of the Pillar, i.e. the symbol of the ever more extensive union between America and Spain." The name of Día de la Hispanidad was introduced as the official name of the national holiday in a decree of 9 January 1958. During the transition to democracy, there was a proposal to shift the national day to 6 December, the day of adoption of the Constitution, but in the end, in a decree of 1982, the day of 12 October was retained, under the name of Fiesta Nacional de España y Día de la Hispanidad. In 1987, the name was reduced to just Día de la Fiesta Nacional de España.

== Veneration of Our Lady of the Pillar around the world ==
Pilar, short for Maria del Pilar, is a common Spanish given name, with name day on the feast of Our Lady of the Pillar.

=== Caribbean ===
- Parroquia Nuestra Señora del Pilar, Río Piedras Pueblo, Puerto Rico, United States
- Iglesia Nuestra Señora del Pilar, Havana, Cuba

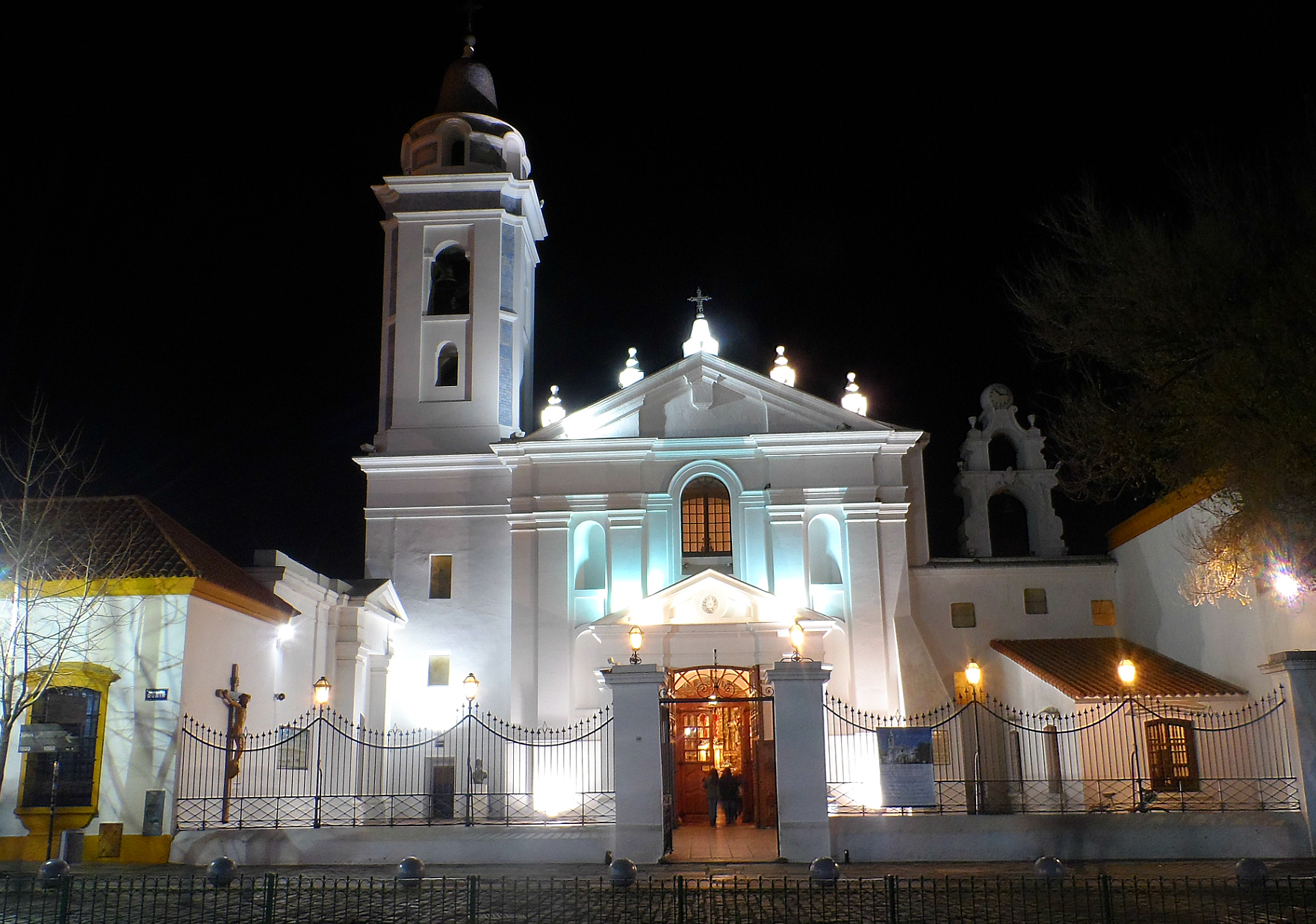
Iglesia Nuestra Señora del Pilar, Recoleta

=== South America ===
- Cathedral of Our Lady of the Pillar and St. Raphael in Melo, Uruguay
- Nuestra Señora del Pilar, Recoleta neighbourhood, Buenos Aires, Argentina
- Nuestra Señora del Pilar, Pilar, Buenos Aires Province, Argentina
- Cathedral of Our Lady of the Pillar, São João del-Rei, Brazil

=== Philippines ===
In the Philippines, ruled by Spain for over three hundred years, Our Lady of the Pillar is honored as the patroness of a number of parishes and municipalities; seven are named Pilar in her honor. There are towns named Pilar in the provinces of Abra, Bataan, Bohol, Capiz, Cebu, Surigao del Norte and Sorsogon. As in Spain, her feast day is celebrated every 12 October.

- In Zamboanga City, the Virgin of the Pillar has been venerated for almost four centuries as the patroness of the city and in the Archdiocese of Zamboanga. The bas relief of her atop the eastern gate of the 17th-century Spanish military fort dedicated to the Virgin, Fort Pilar (Full name: Royal Fort of our Virgin Lady of the Pillar of Zaragoza, El Fuerte Real de Nuestra Señora Virgen del Pilar de Zaragoza), is now a Catholic Marian shrine. The city also has a street named after her – Pilar Street.
- In Davao City, a shrine in honor of Nuestra Señora del Pilar in Magsaysay Park was built through the collaborative efforts of Circulo Zamboangueño de Davao, a local group of transposed from Zamboanga City.
- Our Lady of the Pillar is also the patroness of Santa Cruz parish church in the district of the same name, in the city of Manila. The Jesuits brought the patroness when they administered the church during the Spanish era. Her feast day is also celebrated every 12 October in the district. However, the church has its Marian procession in the 3rd week of October. The image was canonically crowned on 7 December 2017.
- Our Lady of the Pillar is the patroness of Imus, Cavite and the Diocese of Imus enshrined at the Imus Cathedral in Cavite. The city celebrates its fiesta every October with the Karakol, a ritual dance-procession performed in fiestas around the province of Cavite. The image was canonically crowned on 3 December 2012.
- Our Lady of the Pillar is also the patroness, with 12 October as the feast day, in the following places:
  - City of Cauayan, Isabela.
  - Town of Santa Maria, Pangasinan
  - Town of Morong, Bataan.
  - Don Rufino Alonzo Sr. Street, Cotabato City.
  - Town of Baleno, Masbate.
  - Town of Pilar, Bataan.
  - Town of Pilar, Bohol.
  - Town of Pilar, Capiz
  - Town of Pilar, Sorsogon.
  - Town of San Simon, Pampanga.
  - Town of Sibonga, Cebu.
  - Town of Alaminos, Laguna.
  - Town of Mamburao, Occidental Mindoro.
  - Town & Diocese of Libmanan, Camarines Sur
  - Brgy. Kalubkob, Silang, Cavite
  - Brgy. Guinsay, Danao, Cebu
  - Brgy. Guinacot, Danao, Cebu
  - Brgy. New Guinlo, Taytay, Palawan
  - Brgy. Del Pilar, Zaragoza, Nueva Ecija
  - Brgy. Lumbangan, Nasugbu, Batangas
  - Brgy. Indangan, Makilala, Cotabato
  - Brgy. Maao, Bago, Negros Occidental
