= Luis López (editor) =

Spanish editor

Luis López was a seventeenth-century Spanish editor.

López was born in Palencia, but moved to Zaragoza to work as a pastry chef. He later devoted himself to editing. He published several books under his own name, which led some to suppose that he was the author, but it seems more likely that they were written by various Aragonese scholars.

== Works ==
- Tablas Chronológicas universales de España, desde el año 1800 de la creación del mundo, en el que comenzó a poblar el patriarca Túbal, hasta nuestros tiempos por 3799 años (Universal Chronological Tables of Spain, From the Year 1800 of the Creation of the World, When the Patriarch Tubal Began to Populate Spain, for 3799 Years Until our Times) (Zaragoza, 1637)
- Thropheos y antigüedades de la imperial ciudad de Zaragoza, y general historia suya desde su fundación después del diluvio universal por los nietos del patriarca Noé, hasta nuestros tiempos ("Thropheos" and the Antiquities of the Imperial City of Zaragoza, and its General History from its Foundation by the Grandchildren of the Patriarch Noah after the Universal Flood, to our Times) (Barcelona, 1639)
- Pilar de Zaragoza, columna firmísima de la fe de España, primer templo católico del mundo, edificado en nombre de María Santísima por el apóstol Santiago Zebedeo (The Pillar of Zaragoza, the Most Firm Column of the Faith in Spain, the World's First Catholic Church, Built in the Name of the Most Holy Mary by the Apostle James, son of Zebedee) (Alcalá, 1649)
- Anales del reino de Aragón (Annals of the Kingdom of Aragón)
