= Mary of Jesus of Ágreda =

Spanish nun (1602–1665)

Venerable Mary of Jesus of Ágreda OIC
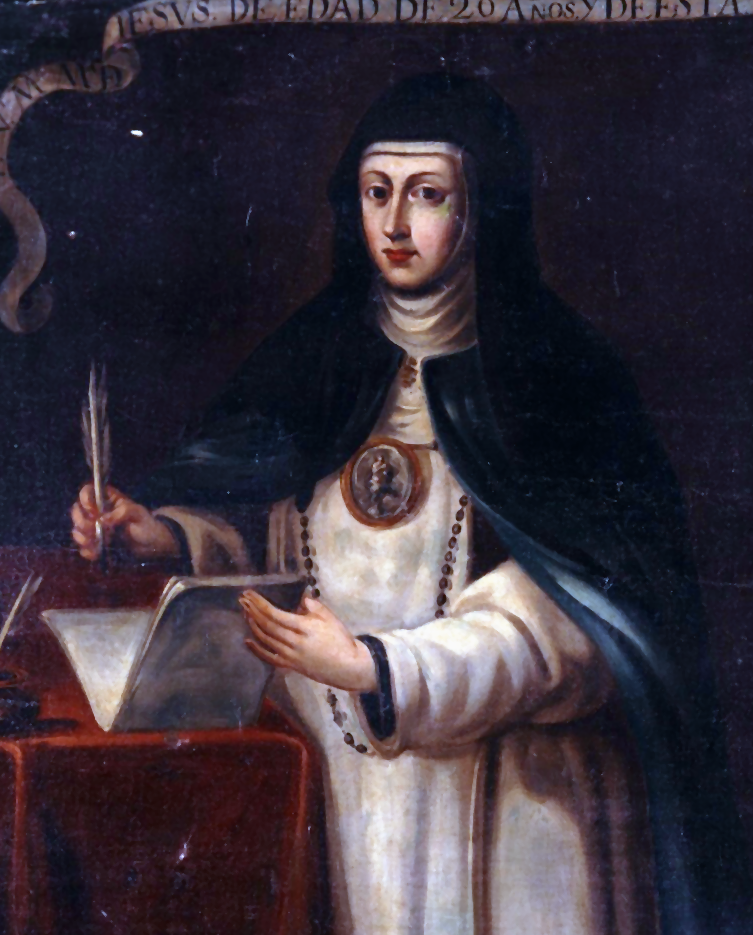

Virgin
- Born: 2 April 1602; Ágreda, Soria, Spain
- Died: 24 May 1665 (aged 63); Ágreda, Soria, Spain

Mary of Jesus of Ágreda, OIC, (Spanish: María de Jesús de Ágreda; born María Coronel y de Arana; 2 April 1602 – 24 May 1665), was an abbess and spiritual writer. She is best known for her extensive correspondence with King Philip IV of Spain and her reports of bilocation between Spain and New Spain. She was a noted mystic whose popularity has endured.

A member of the Conceptionists, Mary of Jesus wrote 14 books, including a series of revelations about the life of the Blessed Virgin Mary. She has been dubbed the "Lady in Blue" and "the blue nun," after the color of the Conceptionist's habit.

== Life ==
=== Early life ===
She was born María Coronel y de Arana, the daughter of Francisco Coronel and Catalina de Arana, in Ágreda, a town located in the Province of Soria. The couple had 11 children, of whom only four survived into adulthood: Francisco, José, María and Jerónima. The family had close ties with the Franciscan friars of the Friary of San Julián, which lay on the outskirts of the town. Either the mother would go to the friary with her children for Mass and confession, or the friars would visit the family home. Nonetheless, Mary later recalled that, as a very young child, she felt her parents were very hard on her.

Mary of Jesus' biographer and contemporary, the bishop José Jiménez y Samaniego, was a longtime friend of the Coronel family, and wrote that even as a young girl, she had ecstasies and visions in which she felt that God was instructing her about the sinfulness of the world. At the age of four, she was confirmed by Bishop Diego de Yepes, the biographer and last confessor of Teresa of Avila, who was reportedly impressed with the child's spiritual acumen.

When Mary of Jesus was twelve, she made the decision to enter a monastery, having decided upon that of the Discalced Carmelite nuns in Tarazona. As her parents prepared to accompany her there, Catalina de Arana had a vision that she was to turn the family home into a monastery in which both she and her daughters were to commit their lives as nuns. While the young María was agreeable to this arrangement, her father refused to go along with it. In this he was supported by his brother, Medel, as well as by their neighbors, who all considered this arrangement a violation of their marriage vows. His resistance lasted for three years, until in 1618, then considered an older man in his early fifties, he (and later his brother) entered the Franciscan Friary of San Antonio in Nalda as a lay brother. Her brothers, who had already become friars, continued their studies toward the Catholic priesthood in Burgos. She and her mother entered the convent together, January, 1619.

=== Monastic life ===
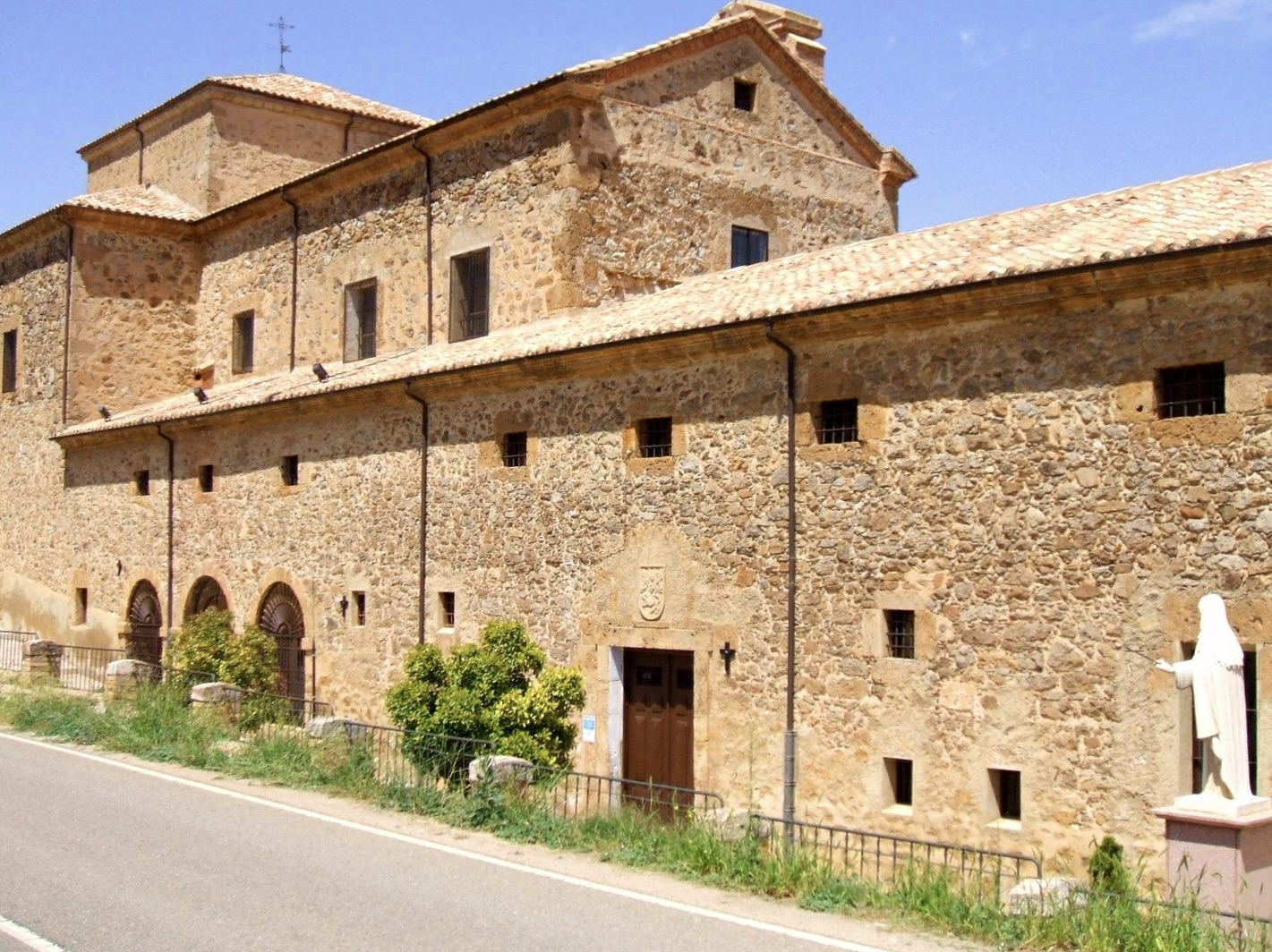
A view of the Monastery of the Immaculate Conception founded by the Venerable María de Jesús de Ágreda with a statue of her in front.

Catalina and her daughters converted their family home into the Monastery of the Immaculate Conception, to be a part of the Order of the Immaculate Conception (Conceptionists). They began this endeavor as part of the Discalced—or reformed—branch of the Order. Unfortunately, there were no monasteries of this branch in the region, so three nuns of the original Calced branch were brought from their monastery in Burgos to serve as the abbess of the community and to train them in the life of the Order. Mary of Jesus was sixteen when she, her mother, and her sister took the religious habit of the Order and she was given the religious name by which she is now known.

As other women soon joined the community, the monastery was rebuilt (and completed in 1633), although when reconstruction began the community's coffers contained 24 reales (approximately 2.5 Spanish dollars at the time), supplemented by a donation of 100 reales from devotees and many other gifts and hours of voluntary labor. Once she had made her religious profession in 1620, Mary of Jesus began to experience a long period of illness and temptations. After her mother's death, which her fellow nuns elected her, now twenty-five years old, as their abbess. Though rules required the abbess to be changed every three years, Mary remained effectively in charge of the monastery until her death, except for a three-year sabbatical in her fifties.

=== Mystical bilocation ===
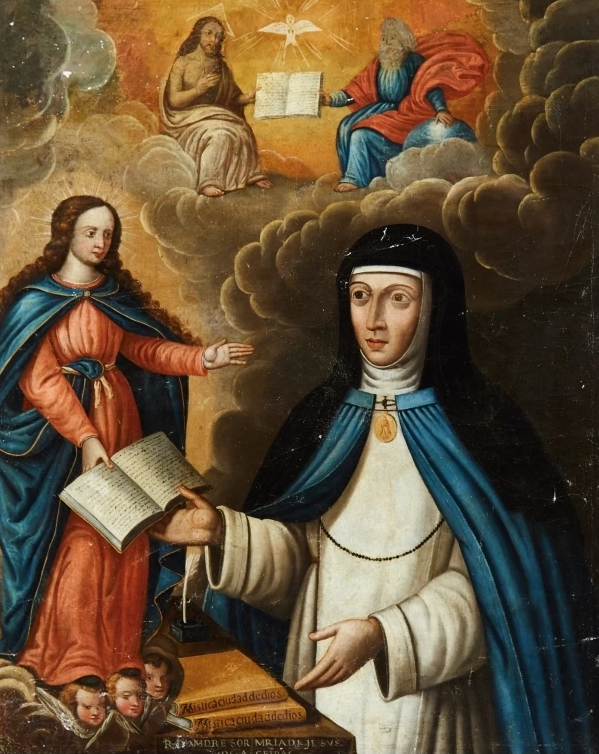
Apparition of the Virgin by Sister María de Jesús de Ágreda, Mexican School, 18th century

Between 1620 and 1623, Mary of Jesus reported that she was often "transported by the aid of the angels" to settlements of a people called Jumanos. The Jumano Indians of New Spain (what is today Texas and New Mexico) had long been requesting missionaries, possibly hoping for protection from the Apaches. Eventually a mission led by the Franciscan Friar Juan de Salas visited them in 1629.

The abbess reported further but less frequent visits afterwards, all while she physically remained in the monastery at Ágreda. They thus are considered bilocations, an event where a person is, or seems to be, in two places at the same time.

Before sending the friars, Alonso de Benavides, Custodian of New Mexico, asked the natives why they were so eager to be baptized. They said they had been visited by a Lady in Blue who had told them to ask the fathers for help, pointing to a painting of a nun in a blue habit and saying she was dressed like that but was a beautiful young girl. The Jumanos visiting Isleta indicated that the Lady in Blue had visited them in the area now known as the Salinas National Monument, south of modern-day Mountainair, New Mexico, about 65 miles (104.6 km) south of Albuquerque. At the same time, Fray Estéban de Perea brought Benavides an inquiry from Sor María's confessor in Spain asking whether there was any evidence that she had visited the Jumanos.

As reports of Mary's mystical excursions to the New World proliferated, the Inquisition took notice, although she was not proceeded against with severity, perhaps because of her long written relationship with the Spanish king.

Accounts of Mary's mystical apparitions in the American Southwest, as well as inspiring passages in Mystical City of God, so stirred 17th- and 18th-century missionaries that they credited her in their own life's work, making her part of the colonial history of the United States.

== Written works ==
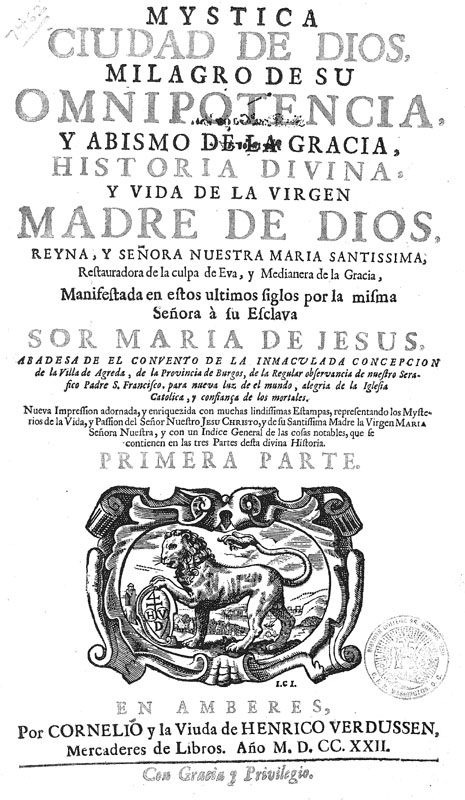
The title page of the Mistica Ciudad de Dios, Vida de la Virgen María, a work written by the Venerable María de Jesús de Ágreda and published in 1722

María de Ágreda's best known single work is the Mystical City of God (Spanish: Mistica Ciudad de Dios, Vida de la Virgen María), consisting of eight books (six volumes). This related her revelations about the terrestrial and heavenly life, reportedly received directly from the Blessed Virgin Mary. The books include information about the relationship of the 'Blessed Virgin' with the Triune God, as well as the doings and Mysteries performed by Jesus. The narrative contains extensive details and covers the New Testament time line. It also relates advice given by Agreda on how to acquire true sanctity.

The Mystical City of God, the biography of Mary, is now frequently studied in college and university programs of Spanish language and culture, for its contribution to Baroque literature. Written in elegant Spanish, it relates both terrestrial and spiritual details. These included the way the earth looks from the space (contained in her unpublished 17th Century "Tratado de rendondez de la Tierra"); the Immaculate Conception of Virgin Mary, the Assumption of Mary, the duties of Michael the Archangel and Gabriel the Archangel; and meticulous detail on the childhood of Jesus. Other details that Mary related concerned Christ's Passion, Resurrection and Ascension.

German philosopher and theologian Joseph Görres, while expressing his admiration for the wonderful depth of its speculations, finds that the style is in the bad taste of the period, pompous and strained, and very wearisome in the prolixity of the moral applications appended to each chapter. In addition to her 14 published works, Mary of Jesus also served for more than 22 years as the spiritual (and sometimes political) advisor to King Philip IV of Spain. Their surviving correspondence includes over 600 letters.

== Suppressed writings ==
On 4 August 1681, the Holy Office suppressed the book Mystical City of God, and Pope Innocent XI forbade the reading of it. However, King Charles II of Spain instantly suspended the execution of the Pontifical decree in Spain. The book did not attract much attention outside of Spain until a Recollect friar, translated and published the first part of it, at Marseilles, France in 1696. This resulted in its being referred to a commission of the Sorbonne, which also condemned it in July 1696.

Further investigations of the book were made in 1729, under Pope Benedict XIII, when her canonization was again urged. In 1748, Pope Benedict XIV, while conceding that the book had received the approbation of the Universities of Salamanca, Alcalá, Toulouse, and Louvain, asked the General of the Franciscans to investigate the authenticity of the writings, as it was alleged that her confessors had tampered with the text.

The German historian and canonist Joseph Hergenröther said that the condemnation of 1681 was because its publication in 1670 ignored Pope Urban VIII's papal bull Sanctissimus Dominus Noster on 16 March 1625 that required a bishop’s approval for the publication of private revelations; or because it contained apocryphal stories. It was also suggested that those who followed the philosophical approach of Thomas Aquinas (mainly the Dominicans and Carmelites) objected to the views of those who followed Duns Scotus (mainly Franciscans) being presented as Divine revelation. Theologian Eusebius Amort wrote a treatise on mysticism, De Revelationibus et Visionibus, etc. (2 vols, Augsburg 1744) directed against the "Mystic City of God,"; it brought him into conflict with several of her Franciscan defenders.

Pope Alexander VIII not only refused the petition, but confirmed the brief of his predecessor. The king made the same request to Pope Innocent XII, who did nothing, however, except to institute a commission to examine the reasons raised by the Spanish Court. Her works had been placed on the Index, but the Franciscans were assured that that was a mistake of the printer, as no condemnation appeared there.

== Death and legacy ==
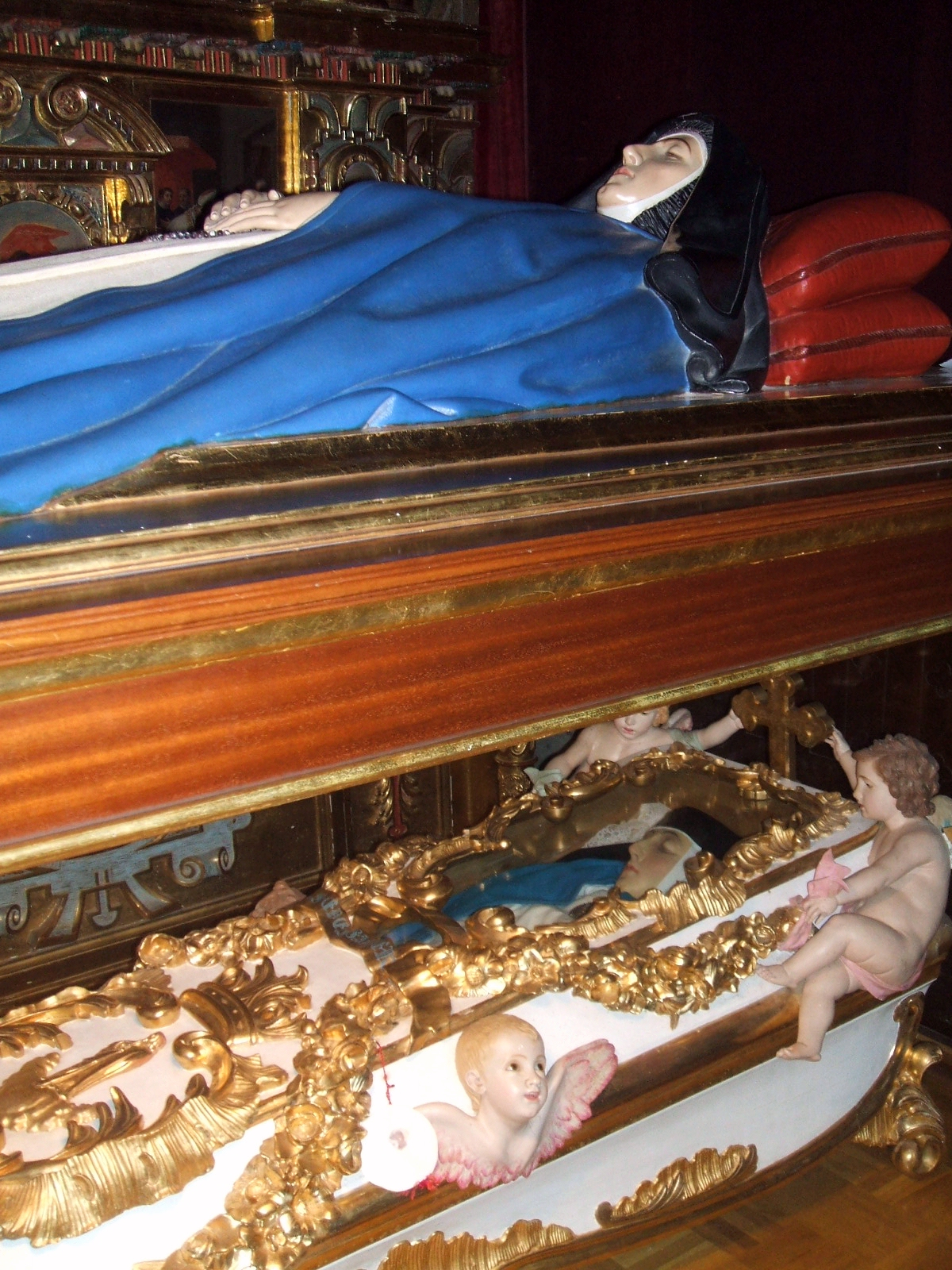
Lying below the blue recumbent statue is the incorrupt body of the venerable María de Jesús de Ágreda in the Church of the Conceptionists' convent in Ágreda.

The tradition of the apostle James and the shrine of Our Lady of the Pillar, reputed to be the first church dedicated to Mary, was given by Our Lady in an apparition to Mary of Jesus of Agreda recorded in The Mystical City of God, and is credited with instigating the rebuilding of the fire-damaged Cathedral Basilica in Zaragoza in the Baroque style in 1681 by Charles II, King of Spain, completed and rededicated in 1686.

=== Relics ===
When Mary of Jesus's casket was opened in 1909, a cursory scientific examination was performed on the 17th century abbess's body. In 1989, a Spanish physician named Andreas Medina participated in another examination of the remains and told investigative journalist Javier Sierra in 1991: "we realized it had absolutely not deteriorated at all in the last eighty years."

=== Beatification process ===
Her cause was opened on 28 January 1673, granting her the title of Servant of God. The abbess is now considered Venerable. After the 400th anniversary of her birth in 2002, several groups renewed attempts to move her beatification process forward.

=== In popular culture ===
San Angelo, Texas, credits the abbess as a pioneering force behind the establishment of early Texas missions.

She is featured in a work of fiction, The Lady in Blue ("La Dama Azul"), by Javier Sierra (Atria Books, 2005/07, ISBN 1-4165-3223-4), as well as in the English biography Maria of Agreda: Mystical Lady in Blue (University of New Mexico Press, 2009). She also served as the inspiration for the novel Blue Water Woman by Ken Farmer (Timber Creek Press, 2016, ISBN 978-0-9971290-8-3), book #7 of The Nations series.

In his memoirs, the 18th-century Italian adventurer Giacomo Casanova describes reading the Mystical City of God during his imprisonment in the Venetian prison I Piombi.

== Bibliography ==
- Henry Gardiner Adams, ed. (1857). "Agreda, Marie d'" . A Cyclopaedia of Female Biography: 18. Wikidata Q115393166 – via Wikisource.
- Carrico, James A. (1962). Life of Venerable Mary of Ágreda. San Bernardino, CA: Emmett J. Culligan.
- Colahan, Clark A. (1994). The Visions of Sor María de Agreda: Writing Knowledge and Power. Tucson: University of Arizona Press. ISBN 0-8165-1419-4.
- "Agreda, Sor María de (1602–1665)". Women in World History: A Biographical Encyclopedia. Vol. 1: Aak-Azz. Waterford, CT: Yorkin Publications. 1999. pp. 123–4.
- Maria of Agreda: Mystical Lady in Blue, by Marilyn H. Fedewa, University of New Mexico Press, 2009. ISBN 978-0-8263-4643-8
- Quill and Cross in the Borderlands: Sor María de Ágreda and the Lady in Blue, 1628 to the Present. By Anna M. Nogar. 2018. Notre Dame: University of Notre Dame Press. ISBN 9780268102135
