= Luis López (footballer, born January 1975) =

Spanish footballer

Personal information
- Full name: Luis Miguel López Beltrán
- Date of birth: 11 January 1975 (age 51)
- Place of birth: Valencia, Spain
- Height: 1.83 m (6 ft 0 in)
- Position: Defender

Senior career*
Years	Team	Apps	(Gls)
1994–1998	Valencia B	126	(12)
1997	Valencia	1	(0)
1998–2000	Levante	62	(3)
2000–2002	Jaén	68	(0)
2003	Logroñés	5	(0)
2003–2004	Gimnàstic	16	(0)
2005–2006	Almansa	34	(0)
2007	Ontinyent	1	(0)
Total		313	(15)
- * Club domestic league appearances and goals

Luis Miguel López Beltrán (born 11 January 1975) is a Spanish former professional footballer who played as a defender.

== Career ==
López began his career with Valencia. He started off with the club's reserve team in Segunda División B, making one hundred and thirty-eight appearances and scoring twelve goals in four years. On 21 June 1997, López made his professional debut for Valencia's first-team in La Liga, he was subbed on at half-time for Patxi Ferreira in a 3–2 defeat to Espanyol. In 1998, Segunda División B side Levante signed López. He netted two goals in forty-two matches in his opening season, which ended with promotion to the Segunda División. 2000 saw López join fellow second tier outfit Jaén, where he remained for two years and featured seventy-one times.

He departed Jaén in 2003 and subsequently had spells with Segunda División B teams Logroñés, Gimnàstic and Almansa up until 2006. López won promotion with Gimnàstic in 2003–04, but suffered relegation with Almansa in 2005–06. His final senior career club became Ontinyent in 2007, he made his one and only appearance for them on 26 August versus Levante B.

== Career statistics ==
As of 16 May 2018.

Club statistics
Club	Season	League			Cup (Note: Includes the Copa del Rey)		League Cup		Continental (Note: Includes the UEFA Cup)		Other		Total	
Club	Season	Division	Apps	Goals	Apps	Goals	Apps	Goals	Apps	Goals	Apps	Goals	Apps	Goals
Valencia B	1994–95	Segunda División B	29	5	—		—		—		6 (Note: Six appearances in 1994–95 Segunda División B play-offs)	0	35	5
Valencia B	1995–96	Segunda División B	34	1	—		—		—		6 (Note: Six appearances in 1995–96 Segunda División B play-offs)	0	40	1
Valencia B	1996–97	Segunda División B	32	3	—		—		—		0	0	32	3
Valencia B	1997–98	Segunda División B	31	3	—		—		—		0	0	31	3
Valencia B	Total		126	12	—		—		—		12	0	138	12
Valencia	1996–97	La Liga	1	0	0	0	—		0	0	0	0	1	0
Levante	1998–99	Segunda División B	34	2	8	0	—		—		0	0	42	2
Levante	1999–2000	Segunda División	28	1	1	0	—		—		0	0	29	1
Levante	Total		62	3	9	0	—		—		0	0	71	3
Jaén	2000–01	Segunda División	37	0	1	0	—		—		0	0	38	0
Jaén	2001–02	Segunda División	31	0	2	0	—		—		0	0	33	0
Jaén	Total		68	0	3	0	—		—		0	0	71	0
Logroñés	2002–03	Segunda División B	5	0	0	0	—		—		0	0	5	0
Gimnàstic	2003–04	Segunda División B	16	0	0	0	—		—		1 (Note: One appearance in 2003–04 Segunda División B play-offs)	0	17	0
Almansa	2005–06	Segunda División B	34	0	2	0	—		—		0	0	36	0
Ontinyent	2007–08	Segunda División B	1	0	0	0	—		—		0	0	1	0
Career total			313	15	11	0	—		0	0	13	0	337	15

== Honours ==
Levante

- Segunda División B: 1998–99
