= Luis López (footballer, born 1979) =

Argentine footballer

Personal information
- Full name: Luis Emanuel López
- Date of birth: 16 August 1979 (age 47)
- Place of birth: Zárate, Argentina
- Position: Midfielder

Senior career*
Years	Team	Apps	(Gls)
1997–2007	Defensores Unidos	187	(13)
2008	La Emilia	1	(0)
2011–2012	Huracán	4	(0)
Total		192	(13)
- * Club domestic league appearances and goals

Luis Emanuel López (born 16 August 1979) is an Argentine former professional footballer who played as a midfielder.

== Career ==
López played the majority of his senior career with Defensores Unidos, first appearing in the first-team during the 1997–98 Primera B Metropolitana season. He made ten appearances in professional football that season, which finished with relegation to Primera C Metropolitana. He scored four goals in the following two campaigns of 1998–99 and 1999–2000; Defensores Unidos were relegated to Primera D Metropolitana in the latter. Five seasons later, the club suffered yet another relegation prior to rejoining Primera D Metropolitana in 2006 - López made one hundred and twenty appearances whilst scoring nine goals during that period.

In 2008, López joined Torneo Argentino B's La Emilia. However, he featured just once for the club's senior squad before departing. 2011 saw him join his final career club, Huracán in Torneo Argentino B. Four appearances followed.

== Career statistics ==
As of 16 May 2018.

Club statistics
Club	Season	League			Cup (Note: Includes the Copa Argentina)		League Cup		Continental		Other		Total	
Club	Season	Division	Apps	Goals	Apps	Goals	Apps	Goals	Apps	Goals	Apps	Goals	Apps	Goals
Huracán	2011–12	Torneo Argentino B	4	0	0	0	—		—		0	0	4	0
Career total			4	0	0	0	—		—		0	0	4	0
