= Luis López (footballer, born 1984) =

Uruguayan footballer

Personal information
- Full name: Luis Manuel López Viera
- Date of birth: 12 September 1984 (age 42)
- Place of birth: Montevideo, Uruguay
- Height: 1.83 m (6 ft 0 in)
- Position: Goalkeeper

Senior career*
Years	Team	Apps	(Gls)
2013–2015	Torque	10	(0)
2015	Huracán	0	(0)
Total		10	(0)
- * Club domestic league appearances and goals

Luis Manuel López Viera (born 12 September 1984) is a former Uruguayan professional footballer who played as a goalkeeper.

== Career ==
López joined Torque in 2013. He made his professional debut on 12 October during a Uruguayan Segunda División draw with Villa Teresa, which was the first of ten appearances during 2013–14 as Torque finished bottom. In 2015, Huracán signed López but he failed to feature for their first-team.

In January 2017, López became a goalkeeping coach for Águila.

== Career statistics ==
As of 16 May 2018.

Club statistics
Club	Season	League			Cup		League Cup		Continental		Other		Total	
Club	Season	Division	Apps	Goals	Apps	Goals	Apps	Goals	Apps	Goals	Apps	Goals	Apps	Goals
Torque	2013–14	Segunda División	10	0	—		—		—		0	0	10	0
Torque	2014–15	Segunda División	0	0	—		—		—		0	0	0	0
Torque	Total		10	0	—		—		—		0	0	10	0
Huracán	2015–16	Segunda División	0	0	—		—		—		0	0	0	0
Career total			10	0	—		—		—		0	0	10	0
