= Luis López (footballer, born May 1975) =

Spanish footballer

Personal information
- Full name: Luis Manuel López Gil
- Date of birth: 4 May 1975 (age 51)
- Place of birth: Madrid, Spain
- Height: 1.78 m (5 ft 10 in)
- Position: Midfielder

Senior career*
| Years | Team | Apps | (Gls) |
| 1995–1996 | Atlético Madrid B | 36 | (2) |
| 1996–1997 | Getafe | 20 | (3) |
| 1997–1998 | Motril | 24 | (6) |
| 1998–1999 | Écija | 26 | (0) |
| 1999–2000 | Fuenlabrada | 38 | (2) |
| 2000–2001 | Alcorcón | 36 | (11) |
| 2001–2005 | Getafe | 63 | (13) |
| 2004–2005 | → Terrassa (loan) | 23 | (3) |
| 2005–2006 | Rayo Vallecano | 22 | (1) |
| 2009–2010 | Alcalá | 19 | (4) |
| Total | | 307 | (45) |
- * Club domestic league appearances and goals

Luis Manuel López Gil (born 4 May 1975) is a Spanish former professional footballer who played as a midfielder.

== Career ==
Atlético Madrid B gave López his senior career debut during the 1995–96 Segunda División B season, manager Santiago Martín Prado selected him for a league match with Moscardó on 8 October 1995. Two months later, López scored his first goal in a 2–3 victory away to Pontevedra on 2 December. Overall, he scored two goals in thirty-eight matches in 1995–96 which ended with promotion. In the Segunda División, he featured three times for Atlético Madrid B; including his professional debut against Mallorca in September 1996. In 1996, Getafe completed the signing of López. He made twenty-two appearances and netted three goals in 96–97.

Between 1997 and 2001, López spent time with various Segunda Division B clubs. Motril, Écija, Fuenlabrada and Alcorcón became teams of López in those aforementioned years, he made a total of one hundred and forty-eight appearances and scored twenty-two goals. He returned to Getafe in 2001. The club were promoted from the third tier to the Segunda Division in his first season. Seven goals in nineteen matches followed during 2002–03. Following two more seasons with Getafe, López left in 2004 to play for fellow Segunda División side Terrassa on loan. His one season with Terrassa ended with relegation.

Subsequent spells with Rayo Vallecano and Alcalá followed as López finished his playing career.

== Career statistics ==
As of 16 May 2018.

Club statistics
| Club | Season | League | | | Cup (Note: Includes the Copa del Rey) | | League Cup | | Continental | | Other | | Total | |
| Club | Season | Division | Apps | Goals | Apps | Goals | Apps | Goals | Apps | Goals | Apps | Goals | Apps | Goals |
|---|---|---|---|---|---|---|---|---|---|---|---|---|---|---|
| Atlético Madrid B | 1995–96 | Segunda División B | 33 | 2 | — | | — | | — | | 5 (Note: Five appearances in 1995–96 Segunda División B play-offs) | 0 | 38 | 2 |
| Atlético Madrid B | 1996–97 | Segunda División | 3 | 0 | — | | — | | — | | 0 | 0 | 3 | 0 |
| Atlético Madrid B | Total | | 36 | 2 | — | | — | | — | | 5 | 0 | 41 | 2 |
| Getafe | 1996–97 | Segunda División B | 20 | 3 | 0 | 0 | — | | — | | 2 (Note: Two appearances in 1996–97 Segunda División B play-offs) | 0 | 22 | 3 |
| Motril | 1997–98 | Segunda División B | 24 | 6 | 0 | 0 | — | | — | | 2 (Note: Two appearances in 1997–98 Segunda División B play-offs) | 0 | 26 | 6 |
| Écija | 1998–99 | Segunda División B | 26 | 0 | 0 | 0 | — | | — | | 0 | 0 | 26 | 0 |
| Fuenlabrada | 1999–2000 | Segunda División B | 38 | 2 | 0 | 0 | — | | — | | 0 | 0 | 38 | 2 |
| Alcorcón | 2000–01 | Segunda División B | 36 | 11 | 0 | 0 | — | | — | | 0 | 0 | 36 | 11 |
| Getafe | 2001–02 | Segunda División B | 33 | 6 | 1 | 0 | — | | — | | 6 (Note: Six appearances in 2001–02 Segunda División B play-offs) | 1 (Note: One goal in 2001–02 Segunda División B play-offs) | 40 | 7 |
| Getafe | 2002–03 | Segunda División | 17 | 7 | 2 | 0 | — | | — | | 0 | 0 | 19 | 7 |
| Getafe | 2003–04 | Segunda División | 13 | 0 | 1 | 0 | — | | — | | 0 | 0 | 14 | 0 |
| Getafe | 2004–05 | La Liga | 0 | 0 | 0 | 0 | — | | — | | 0 | 0 | 0 | 0 |
| Getafe | Total | | 63 | 13 | 4 | 0 | — | | — | | 6 | 1 | 73 | 14 |
| Terrassa (loan) | 2004–05 | Segunda División | 23 | 3 | 1 | 0 | — | | — | | 0 | 0 | 24 | 3 |
| Rayo Vallecano | 2005–06 | Segunda División B | 22 | 1 | 2 | 0 | — | | — | | 0 | 0 | 24 | 1 |
| Alcalá | 2009–10 | Segunda División B | 19 | 4 | 1 | 0 | — | | — | | 0 | 0 | 20 | 4 |
| Career total | | | 307 | 45 | 8 | 0 | — | | — | | 15 | 1 | 330 | 46 |
