= Luis López (Nicaraguan footballer) =

Nicaraguan footballer (born 1998)

Personal information
- Full name: Luis Alfredo López
- Date of birth: 11 September 1998 (age 28)
- Place of birth: Managua, Nicaragua
- Height: 1.70 m (5 ft 7 in)
- Position: Left back

Team information
- Current team: Real Estelí
- Number: 3

Senior career*
Years	Team	Apps	(Gls)
2016–	Real Estelí	72	(8)
2017	→ Juventus Managua (loan)	2	(0)

International career^{‡}
2019–	Nicaragua	4	(0)
- * Club domestic league appearances and goals as of 6 March 2021. ‡ National team caps and goals as of 10 October 2020.

Luis Alfredo López (born 11 September 1998) is a Nicaraguan footballer who plays as a left back for Liga Primera club Real Estelí FC and the Nicaragua national team.
