= Contemporary Historical Examination of Current Operations =

The Contemporary Historical Examination of Current Operations (CHECO), was a series of historical documents created by the United States Air Force History Office from 1964 through 1979, about operations in Southeast Asia, during the Vietnam War. The series produced over 200 reports – many have been declassified in the early 1990s.

== History ==
Project CHECO was an Air Force effort to document aerial operations in Southeast Asia, with emphasis on new forces, tactics and techniques, materials, and methods. The project was established by the Air Staff in June 1962, at the request of Lieutenant General Thomas S. Moorman, the vice commander of Pacific Air Forces. It was under the command of Headquarters Pacific Forces and the 2nd Air Division; which was redesignated 7th Air Force in April 1966. Over the course of 15 years, over 250 reports were established on topics that included command arrangements, training, air base defense, special operations, conventional air operations, and many others.

== List of reports ==
Reports
Number of Reports	Pages	Title	Date
	230	The War in Vietnam 1966	23 October 1967
179	97	Attack on Cam Ranh	25 August 1971
	157	Khe Sanh (Operation: Niagara)	22 January - 31 March 1968
	183	Igloo White	January 1970 - September 1971
196	129	Base Defense in Thailand	18 February 1973
	74	Tactical Data Systems Interface (U)	1 January 1975
204	62	Guided Bomb Operations in Southeast Asia: The Weather Dimension	1 February - 31 December 1972
	62	Linebacker Operations	31 December 1978
	224	The Royal Thai Air Force	3 December 1971

== List of USAF Search and Rescue reports ==
Reports
Pages	Title	Date
91	Evasion and Escape, SEA	1964 - 1971
118	USAF Search and Rescue in Southeast Asia	1961 - 24 Oct 1966
53	USAF Search and Rescue	July 1966 - November 1967
101	The USAF Helicopter in Sea	4 December 1968
117	USAF Search and Rescue	November 1967 - June 1969
167	USAF Search & Rescue in Southeast Asia	1 July 1969 - 30 December 1970
88	Search and Rescue Operations in SEA	1 April 1972 - 30 June 1973
