= Luis López (footballer, born 1983) =

Dominican footballer

Personal information
- Full name: Luis Manuel López Checo
- Date of birth: 12 July 1983 (age 43)
- Place of birth: Salcedo, Dominican Republic
- Height: 1.73 m (5 ft 8 in)
- Position: Centre back

Team information
- Current team: Jarabacoa

Senior career*
Years	Team	Apps	(Gls)
- Club Herminio Padrón
- Club Ilusión Pibe
2010	Moca FC		
- Los 30 FC
- Ojo de Agua
- San Francisco
- Barcelona Atlético
2014	Los 30 de Villa Tapia		
2015	Cibao FC	12	(0)
2017	Atlético San Francisco		
2018–	Jarabacoa		

International career^{‡}
2015	Dominican Republic	1	(0)
- * Club domestic league appearances and goals ‡ National team caps and goals as of 11:14, 18 May 2018 (UTC)

Luis Manuel López Checo (born 12 July 1983) is a Dominican footballer who plays as a defender who plays for Jarabacoa FC.

== Career ==
=== Club ===
López's first career club was Club Herminio Padrón. In the following years, López had spells with Club Ilusión Pibe, Moca FC, Los 30 FC, Ojo de Agua and San Francisco. He then featured for Barcelona Atlético and Los 30 de Villa Tapia in the Primera División de Republica Dominicana. In 2015, López joined Liga Dominicana de Fútbol side Cibao FC. He subsequently made twelve professional football appearances in the following campaign.

=== International ===
López previously represented the Dominican Republic U20s. In 2015, he was called up to the senior team for 2018 FIFA World Cup qualifiers with Belize. He made his international debut on 14 June during a 3–0 loss away to Belize.

== Career statistics ==
As of 17 May 2018.

National team	Year	Apps	Goals
Dominican Republic	2015	1	0
Total		1	0
