= Mystical City of God =

17th century book

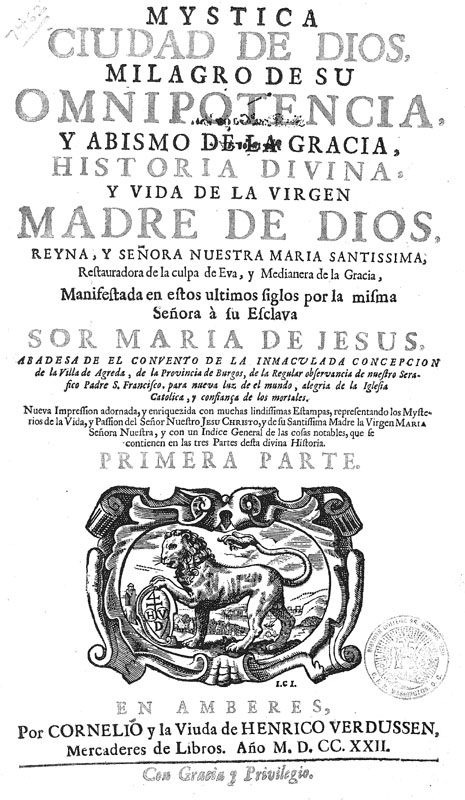
Title page of the revelations of Venerable Mary of Jesus of Ágreda, 1722, Verdussen, Antwerp.

Mystical City of God is a book written in the 17th century by the Franciscan nun Venerable Mary of Jesus of Ágreda.

According to María de Ágreda, the book was to a considerable extent dictated to her by the Blessed Virgin Mary and regarded the life of the Virgin Mary and the divine plan for creation and the salvation of souls. The work alternates between descriptions of the Trinity, the Virgin Mary's life, and the spiritual guidance she provides to the author, by whom her words were reproduced for the spiritual benefit and growth of the reader. The book describes at length the various virtues, and how the reader should live in order to see them reflected in their own life, with the Virgin Mary as their model for sanctity. The work has the Imprimatur of several Popes and Bishops and appeals primarily to those who believe in private revelation and the sanctity of Mary.

In 1673, María de Ágreda was declared venerable soon after her death, but the process of her beatification has yet to be completed. Beatification and canonization do not authenticate revelations, however.

== Excerpt ==
"My daughter, one of the misfortunes, which deprive souls of happiness, or at least diminish it, is that they content themselves with performing good works negligently or without fervor, as if they were engaged in things unimportant or merely accidental. On account of this ignorance and meanness of heart few of them arrive at an intimate friendship of God, which they can attain only by fervent love. This is called fervent precisely because of its similarity to boiling water. For just as water is made to boil and foam by the fire, so the soul, by the sweet violence of the divine conflagration of love, is raised above itself and above all created things as well as above its own doings. In loving, it is more and more inflamed, and from this very love springs an unquenchable affection, which makes the soul despise and forget all earthly things while at the same time it becomes dissatisfied with all temporal goodness. And as the human heart, when it does not attain what it dearly loves (if that attainment is possible) is inflamed with ever greater desire of reaching it by other means; therefore, the loving soul, finds ever new things to strive after for the sake of the Beloved and all service will seem to it but little. Thus it will pass from good will to a perfect will, and from this to what will please the Lord still more, until it arrives at the most intimate union with Him and at a perfect conformation with the will of God." (The Mystical City of God, volume II, 594)

== Controversy ==
Chapter 3 of Book 8 claims Mark the Evangelist wrote his Gospel in Hebrew while in Judea, then translated his Gospel into Latin while in Rome, whereas it was the opinion of several of the Church Fathers that Mark wrote his Gospel in Greek while in Rome.
