= 2004 Copa del Rey final =

- Event: 2003–04 Copa del Rey
Real Madrid	Zaragoza
2	3
- After extra time
- Date: 17 March 2004
- Venue: Estadi Olímpic Lluís Companys, Barcelona
- Referee: Fernando Carmona Méndez
- Attendance: 54,000
- Weather: Overcast; 13 °C (55 °F)

The 2004 Copa del Rey final was the 102nd final of the Copa del Rey. The final was played at Montjuïc in Barcelona, on 17 March 2004.

The match was won by Zaragoza, who defeated Real Madrid 3–2 after extra time, winning the tournament for the sixth time in club history.

== Match details ==
17 March 2004
21:00 CET

Real Madrid	2–3 (a.e.t.)	Zaragoza
Beckham 24'; Roberto Carlos 47'	Report	Dani 28'; Villa 45' (pen.); Galletti 112'

Estadi Olímpic Lluís Companys, Barcelona
Attendance: 54,000
Referee: Fernando Carmona Méndez (Extremadura)

Real Madrid	Real Zaragoza

GK	25	(Spain) César Sánchez
RB	2	(Spain) Míchel Salgado	(yellow card) 8'
CB	6	(Spain) Iván Helguera	(yellow card) 98'
CB	15	(Spain) Raúl Bravo	(yellow card) 90'
LB	3	(Brazil) Roberto Carlos
CM	23	(England) David Beckham
CM	14	(Spain) Guti	(yellow card) 44'	(red card) 95'
CM	21	(Argentina) Santiago Solari	(yellow card) 81'		(substituted off) 84'
AM	5	(France) Zinedine Zidane	(yellow card) 117'
CF	10	(Portugal) Luís Figo	(yellow card) 56'
CF	7	(Spain) Raúl (c)
Substitutes:
GK	1	(Spain) Iker Casillas
DF	22	(Spain) Francisco Pavón
DF	33	(Spain) Álvaro Mejía
DF	34	(Spain) Juanfran
MF	8	(Spain) Borja Fernández
MF	19	(Argentina) Esteban Cambiasso
FW	11	(Spain) Javier Portillo			(substituted on) 84'
Manager:
(Portugal) Carlos Queiroz

GK	1	(Spain) César Láinez	(yellow card) 113'
RB	4	(Spain) Luis Cuartero (c)
CB	5	(Brazil) Álvaro	(yellow card) 40'
CB	6	(Argentina) Gabriel Milito	(yellow card) 38'
LB	12	(Paraguay) Delio Toledo
RM	23	(Spain) Dani García			(substituted off) 60'
CM	14	(Argentina) Leonardo Ponzio			(substituted off) 69'
CM	17	(Spain) José María Movilla
LM	10	(Brazil) Sávio			(substituted off) 96'
SS	8	(Spain) Cani	(yellow card) 65'	(red card) 67'
CF	20	(Spain) David Villa	(yellow card) 69'
Substitutes:
GK	25	(Spain) Raúl Valbuena
DF	3	(Peru) Miguel Rebosio
MF	21	(Spain) David Pirri
MF	27	(Spain) David Generelo			(substituted on) 69'
FW	7	(Argentina) Luciano Galletti	(yellow card) 74'		(substituted on) 60'
FW	9	(Spain) Yordi
FW	29	(Spain) Juanele	(yellow card) 99'		(substituted on) 96'
Manager:
(Spain) Víctor Muñoz

Match rules

- 90 minutes
- 30 minutes of extra time if necessary
- Penalty shoot-out if scores still level
- Seven named substitutes
- Maximum of three substitutions
