= 2006 Copa del Rey final =

- Event: 2005–06 Copa del Rey
Espanyol	Real Zaragoza
4	1
- Date: 12 April 2006
- Venue: Santiago Bernabéu, Madrid
- Referee: Medina Cantalejo
- Attendance: 78,000
- Weather: Clear; 15 °C (59 °F)

The 2006 Copa del Rey final was the 104th final since its establishment. The match took place on 12 April 2006 at the Santiago Bernabéu Stadium in Madrid. The match was contested by Espanyol and Real Zaragoza, and it was refereed by Medina Cantalejo. Espanyol lifted the trophy for the fourth time in their history with a 4–1 victory.

== Road to the final ==
Espanyol			Round	Real Zaragoza
Opponent	Result	Legs		Opponent	Result	Legs
			Round of 32	Xerez	2-2	1 legged; penalties; 7–6
Getafe	4–3	1–0 away; 3–3 home	Round of 16	Atlético Madrid	3–2	1–0 away; 2–2 home
Cádiz	4–0	2–0 away; 2–0 home	Quarter-finals	Barcelona	5–4	4–2 home; 1–2 away
Deportivo La Coruña	2–1	2–1 home; 0–0 away	Semi-finals	Real Madrid	6–5	6–1 home; 0–4 away

== Match details ==
12 April 2006
21:30 CEST

Espanyol	4–1	Real Zaragoza
Tamudo 2'; L. García 33', 86'; Coro 71'	Report	Ewerthon 28'

Santiago Bernabéu, Madrid
Attendance: 78,000
Referee: Medina Cantalejo (Andalusia)

RCD Espanyol	Real Zaragoza

GK	13	(Cameroon) Carlos Kameni
DF	8	(Argentina) Pablo Zabaleta
DF	4	(Spain) Alberto Lopo
DF	21	(Spain) Daniel Jarque	(yellow card) 16'
DF	3	(Spain) David García
MF	14	(Spain) Ito	(yellow card) 18'	(substituted off) 62'
MF	6	(Brazil) Eduardo Costa
MF	15	(Brazil) Fredson		(substituted off) 62'
MF	9	(Spain) Iván de la Peña
FW	10	(Spain) Luis García
FW	23	(Spain) Raúl Tamudo (c)	(yellow card) 88'	(substituted off) 77'
Substitutes:
GK	1	(Spain) Gorka Iraizoz
DF	2	(Mozambique) Armando Sá
DF	5	(Argentina) Mauricio Pochettino
MF	22	(Spain) Moisés Hurtado		(substituted on) 62'
MF	17	(Spain) Juanfran
FW	20	(Spain) Coro		(substituted on) 62'
FW	7	(Uruguay) Walter Pandiani		(substituted on) 77'
Manager:
(Spain) Miguel Ángel Lotina

GK	1	(Spain) César Sánchez	(yellow card) 42' (red card) 74'
DF	14	(Argentina) Leonardo Ponzio
DF	5	(Brazil) Álvaro
DF	6	(Argentina) Gabriel Milito	(yellow card) 36'
DF	12	(Paraguay) Delio Toledo		(substituted off) 75'
MF	8	(Spain) Cani (c)
MF	21	(Spain) Alberto Zapater
MF	16	(Spain) Albert Celades	(yellow card) 48'	(substituted off) 66'
MF	18	(Spain) Óscar	(yellow card) 26'	(substituted off) 51'
FW	17	(Brazil) Ewerthon
FW	22	(Argentina) Diego Milito
Substitutes:
GK	25	(Spain) Raúl Valbuena		(substituted on) 75'
DF	4	(Spain) Luis Cuartero
MF	20	(Spain) David Generelo
MF	7	(Spain) José María Movilla		(substituted on) 66'
MF	15	(Spain) Ángel Lafita
MF	10	(Brazil) Sávio		(substituted on) 51'
FW	9	(Spain) Sergio García
Manager:
(Spain) Víctor Muñoz

Match rules

- 90 minutes
- 30 minutes of extra time if necessary
- Penalty shoot-out if scores still level
- Seven named substitutes
- Maximum of three substitutions
