= 2004–05 Real Zaragoza season =

Real Zaragoza
2004–05 season
- Head coach: Víctor Muñoz
- Stadium: La Romareda
- La Liga: 12th
- Copa del Rey: Round of 64
- Supercopa de España: Winners
- UEFA Cup: Round of 16
- Top goalscorer: League: David Villa (15); All: David Villa (18)

The 2004–05 season was the 73rd season in the history of Real Zaragoza and the club's second consecutive season in the top flight of Spanish football. In addition to the domestic league, Real Zaragoza participated in this season's editions of the Copa del Rey, the Supercopa de España and the UEFA Cup.

== Pre-season and friendlies ==
Win Draw Loss

17 July 2004 Friendly	Marseille (France)	0–0	(Spain) Zaragoza	Nyon
				Stadium: Centre sportif de Colovray Nyon

19 July 2004 Friendly	Zaragoza (Spain)	0–1	(Portugal) Benfica	Nyon
17:15 CET (UTC+01)			Zahovič 15'	Stadium: Centre sportif de Colovray Nyon

21 July 2004 Friendly	Lyon (France)	0–0	(Spain) Zaragoza	Nyon
				Stadium: Centre sportif de Colovray Nyon

24 July 2004 Friendly	Wohlen (Switzerland)	1–5	(Spain) Zaragoza	Nyon
				Stadium: Centre sportif de Colovray Nyon

3 August 2004 Friendly	Watford (England)	1–2	(Spain) Zaragoza	England

7 August 2004 Friendly	Bolton Wanderers (England)	1–1	(Spain) Zaragoza	England

8 August 2004 Friendly	Chelsea (England)	3–0	(Spain) Zaragoza	England

14 August 2004 Trofeo Teresa Herrera	Atlético Madrid (Spain)	3–2	(Spain) Zaragoza	A Coruña
				Stadium: Estadio Riazor

15 August 2004 Trofeo Teresa Herrera	Sporting CP (Portugal)	0–2	(Spain) Zaragoza	A Coruña
				Stadium: Estadio Riazor

8 October 2004 Trofeo Ciudad de Zaragoza	Zaragoza (Spain)	0–2	(Spain) Atlético Madrid	Zaragoza
				Stadium: La Romareda

== Competitions ==
=== Overall record ===
Competition	First match	Last match	Starting round	Final position	Record							
Competition	First match	Last match	Starting round	Final position	Pld	W	D	L	GF	GA	GD	Win %
La Liga	29 August 2004	28 May 2005	Matchday 1	12th	38	14	8	16	52	57	−5	36.84
Copa del Rey	27 October 2004		Round of 64	Round of 64	1	0	0	1	1	2	−1	0.00
UEFA Cup	16 September 2004	17 March 2005	Group stage	Round of 16	10	6	3	1	15	9	+6	60.00
Total					49	20	11	18	68	68	+0	40.82

Source: Competitions

=== La Liga ===
==== League table ====
Pos	Team	Pld	W	D	L	GF	GA	GD	Pts
10	Málaga	38	15	6	17	40	48	−8	51 (Note: DEP: 8 pts; ATH: 4 pts → ATH 1–0 MLG; MLG: 4 pts → MLG 1–0 ATH)
11	Atlético Madrid	38	13	11	14	40	34	+6	50 (Note: ATM 1–1 ZAR; ZAR 0–0 ATM)
12	Zaragoza	38	14	8	16	52	57	−5	50
13	Getafe	38	12	11	15	38	46	−8	47 (Note: RSO 1–1 GET; GET 2–0 RSO)
14	Real Sociedad	38	13	8	17	47	56	−9	47

Source: LFP
Rules for classification: 1st points; 2nd head-to-head points; 3rd head-to-head goal difference; 4th head-to-head goals scored; 5th goal difference; 6th number of goals scored; 7th Fair-play points

==== Results summary ====
Overall								Home						Away					
Pld	W	D	L	GF	GA	GD	Pts	W	D	L	GF	GA	GD	W	D	L	GF	GA	GD
38	14	8	16	52	57	−5	50	11	3	5	35	25	+10	3	5	11	17	32	−15

Source: La Liga

==== Results by round ====
Round	1	2	3	4	5	6	7	8	9	10	11	12	13	14	15	16	17	18	19	20	21	22	23	24	25	26	27	28	29	30	31	32	33	34	35	36	37	38
Ground	H	A	H	A	H	A	H	A	H	A	A	H	A	H	A	H	A	H	A	A	H	A	H	A	H	A	H	A	H	H	A	H	A	H	A	H	A	H
Result	W	D	W	L	W	L	W	L	W	D	D	L	L	L	D	L	W	W	L	L	W	L	L	D	W	L	W	W	D	D	W	W	L	W	L	D	L	L
Position	1	7	6	9	7	9	7	8	4	6	5	9	11	11	11	13	12	11	11	12	12	12	12	13	11	13	11	11	11	11	11	11	11	8	10	9	9	12

Source: La Liga
A = Away; H = Home; W = Win; D = Draw; L = Loss

==== Matches ====
29 August 2004 1	Zaragoza	3–1	Getafe	Zaragoza
				Stadium: La Romareda

12 September 2004 2	Málaga	0–0	Zaragoza	Málaga
				Stadium: La Romareda

19 September 2004 3	Zaragoza	4–3	Albacete	Zaragoza
				Stadium: La Romareda

23 September 2004 4	Barcelona	4–1	Zaragoza	Barcelona
				Stadium: Camp Nou

26 September 2004 5	Zaragoza	4–3	Levante	Zaragoza
				Stadium: La Romareda

3 October 2004 6	Villarreal	2–0	Zaragoza	Villarreal
				Stadium: Estadio El Madrigal

17 October 2004 7	Zaragoza	2–1	Real Sociedad	Zaragoza
				Stadium: La Romareda

24 October 2004 8	Racing Santander	1–0	Zaragoza	Santander
				Stadium: Campos de Sport de El Sardinero

31 October 2004 9	Zaragoza	3–0	Sevilla	Zaragoza
				Stadium: La Romareda

7 November 2004 10	Atlético Madrid	1–1	Zaragoza	Madrid
				Stadium: Vicente Calderón

13 November 2004 11	Valencia	0–0	Zaragoza	Valencia
				Stadium: Mestalla; Referee: Antonio Rubinos Pérez

21 November 2004 12	Zaragoza	0–1	Mallorca	Zaragoza
				Stadium: La Romareda; Referee: Alfonso Pérez Burrull

28 November 2004 13	Numancia	2–1	Zaragoza	Valencia
				Stadium: Nuevo Estadio Los Pajaritos; Referee: Miguel Ángel Pérez Lasa

5 December 2004 14	Zaragoza	0–1	Espanyol	Zaragoza
				Stadium: La Romareda; Referee: Evaristo Puentes Leira

12 December 2004 15	Osasuna	2–2	Zaragoza	Pamplona
				Stadium: El Sadar; Referee: Eduardo Iturralde González

19 December 2004 16	Zaragoza	0–2	Athletic Bilbao	Zaragoza
			Ezquerro 53', 78'	Stadium: La Romareda; Referee: David Fernández Borbalán

22 December 2004 17	Deportivo La Coruña	2–3	Zaragoza	A Coruña
				Stadium: Nuevo Riazor; Referee: Rafael Ramírez Domínguez

9 January 2005 18	Zaragoza	1–0	Real Betis	Zaragoza
	Sávio 43'			Stadium: La Romareda; Referee: Manuel Mejuto González

16 January 2005 19	Real Madrid	3–1	Zaragoza	Madrid
				Stadium: Santiago Bernabéu; Referee: Losantos Omar

23 January 2005 20	Getafe	3–0	Zaragoza	Getafe
				Stadium: Coliseum Alfonso Pérez; Referee: Alberto Undiano Mallenco

30 January 2005 21	Zaragoza	1–0	Málaga	Zaragoza
	Cani 15'			Stadium: La Romareda; Referee: Carlos Megía Dávila

6 February 2005 22	Albacete	2–1	Zaragoza	Albacete
	Pacheco 47' (pen.), 84' (pen.)		González 14'	Stadium: Estadio Carlos Belmonte; Referee: Fernando Teixeira Vitienes

12 February 2005 23	Zaragoza	1–4	Barcelona	Zaragoza
				Stadium: La Romareda

20 February 2005 24	Levante	0–0	Zaragoza	Valencia
				Stadium: Ciutat de València

27 February 2005 25	Zaragoza	1–0	Villarreal	Zaragoza
				Stadium: La Romareda

2 March 2005 26	Real Sociedad	2–1	Zaragoza	San Sebastián
				Stadium: Anoeta Stadium

6 March 2005 27	Zaragoza	1–0	Racing Santander	Zaragoza
				Stadium: La Romareda

13 March 2005 28	Sevilla	0–1	Zaragoza	Seville
				Stadium: Ramón Sánchez Pizjuán

20 March 2005 29	Zaragoza	0–0	Atlético Madrid	Zaragoza
				Stadium: La Romareda

2 April 2005 30	Zaragoza	2–2	Valencia	Zaragoza
				Stadium: La Romareda

10 April 2005 31	Mallorca	0–2	Zaragoza	Palma
				Stadium: Estadi de Son Moix

17 April 2005 32	Zaragoza	4–1	Numancia	Zaragoza
				Stadium: La Romareda

24 April 2005 33	Espanyol	3–1	Zaragoza	Barcelona
				Stadium: Estadi Olímpic Lluís Companys

1 May 2005 34	Zaragoza	5–1	Osasuna	Zaragoza
				Stadium: La Romareda

7 May 2005 35	Athletic Bilbao	2–0	Zaragoza	Bilbao
				Stadium: San Mamés

15 May 2005 36	Zaragoza	2–2	Deportivo La Coruña	Zaragoza
				Stadium: La Romareda

21 May 2005 37	Real Betis	3–2	Zaragoza	Seville
				Stadium: Benito Villamarín

28 May 2005 38	Zaragoza	1–3	Real Madrid	Zaragoza
				Stadium: La Romareda

=== Copa del Rey ===
27 October 2004 Round of 64	Gimnàstic Tarragona	2–1	Zaragoza	Tarragona
				Stadium: Nou Estadi de Tarragona

=== Supercopa de España ===
21 August 2004 First leg	Real Zaragoza	0–1	Valencia	La Romareda, Zaragoza
22:00 CET			Vicente 61'	Attendance: 25,000; Referee: Julián Rodríguez Santiago

24 August 2004 Second leg	Valencia	1–3 (2–3 agg.)	Real Zaragoza	Estadio Mestalla, Valencia
22:00 CET	Corradi 53'		Álvaro 11'; Galletti 33'; Javi Moreno 82'	Attendance: 35,000; Referee: Carlos Megía Dávila

=== UEFA Cup ===
==== First round ====
16 September 2004 First leg	Zaragoza (Spain)	1–0	(Czech Republic) Sigma Olomouc	Zaragoza, Spain
21:00	Generelo 84'	Report		Stadium: La Romareda; Referee: Markus Nobs (Switzerland)

30 September 2004 Second leg	Sigma Olomouc (Czech Republic)	2–3 (2–4 agg.)	(Spain) Zaragoza	Olomouc, Czech Republic
19:00	Hudec 11'; Kobylík 52' (pen.)	Report	Soriano 78'; Hudec 80' (o.g.); Moreno 85'	Stadium: Andrův stadion Referee: Željko Širić (Croatia)

==== Group stage ====
The group stage draw was held on 5 October 2004.

Pos	Team	Pld	W	D	L	GF	GA	GD	Pts	Qualification	DNI	ZAR	AUS	BRU	UTR
1	(Ukraine) Dnipro Dnipropetrovsk	4	3	0	1	7	5	+2	9	Advance to knockout stage	—	—	1–0	3–2	—
2	(Spain) Zaragoza	4	2	1	1	5	3	+2	7	Advance to knockout stage	2–1	—	—	—	2–0
3	Austria Wien	4	2	1	1	4	3	+1	7	Advance to knockout stage	—	1–0	—	1–1	—
4	(Belgium) Club Brugge	4	1	2	1	5	5	0	5		—	1–1	—	—	1–0
5	(Netherlands) Utrecht	4	0	0	4	2	7	−5	0		1–2	—	1–2	—	—

Source: RSSSF

21 October 2004 1	Zaragoza (Spain)	2–0	(Netherlands) Utrecht	Zaragoza, Spain
20:45	Villa 77', 82'	Report		Stadium: La Romareda; Attendance: 13,000; Referee: Peter Sippel (Germany)

4 November 2004 2	Austria Wien	1–0	(Spain) Zaragoza	Vienna, Austria
20:45	Gilewicz 70'	Report		Stadium: Ernst-Happel-Stadion; Attendance: 18,800; Referee: Paolo Bertini (Italy)

1 December 2004 3	Zaragoza (Spain)	2–1	(Ukraine) Dnipro Dnipropetrovsk	Zaragoza, Spain
20:45	Sávio 9'; Generelo 73'	Report	Yezerskiy 2'	Stadium: La Romareda; Attendance: 11,000; Referee: Emil Božinovski (Macedonia)

16 December 2004 4	Club Brugge (Belgium)	1–1	(Spain) Zaragoza	Bruges, Belgium
20:45	Čeh 67'	Report	Sávio 39'	Stadium: Jan Breydel Stadium; Attendance: 20,690; Referee: Florian Meyer (Germany)

==== Knockout stage ====
===== Round of 32 =====
17 February 2005 First leg	Fenerbahçe (Turkey)	0–1	(Spain) Zaragoza	Istanbul, Turkey
19:00 (CET)		Report	Álvaro 72'	Stadium: Şükrü Saracoğlu Stadium; Attendance: 43,000; Referee: Nicolai Vollquartz (Denmark)

24 February 2005 Second leg	Zaragoza (Spain)	2–1 (3–1 agg.)	(Turkey) Fenerbahçe	Zaragoza, Spain
20:45 (CET)	Galletti 11'; Sávio 71'	Report	Alex 88'	Stadium: La Romareda; Attendance: 15,000; Referee: Eric Braamhaar (Netherlands)

===== Round of 16 =====
10 March 2005 First leg	Austria Wien	1–1	(Spain) Zaragoza	Vienna, Austria
19:30	Rushfeldt 32'	Report	Sávio 74'	Stadium: Ernst-Happel-Stadion; Attendance: 21,000; Referee: Peter Fröjdfeldt (Sweden)

17 March 2005 Second leg	Zaragoza (Spain)	2–2 (3 (a)–3 agg.)	Austria Wien	Zaragoza, Spain
20:45	Villa 59'; Galletti 63'	Report	Papac 6'; Dosunmu 12'	Stadium: La Romareda; Attendance: 27,000; Referee: Alain Hamer (Luxembourg)
