= 2000–01 Villarreal CF season =

Villarreal
2000–01 season
- President: Fernando Roig
- Head coach: Víctor Muñoz
- Stadium: El Madrigal
- La Liga: 7th
- Copa del Rey: Round of 32
- Top goalscorer: League: Víctor (14); All: Víctor (15)

The 2000–01 season was Villarreal Club de Fútbol's 78th season in existence and the club's first season back in the top flight of Spanish football since 1999. In addition to the domestic league, Villarreal participated in this season's edition of the Copa del Rey. The season covered the period from 1 July 2000 to 30 June 2001.

== Pre-season and friendlies ==
Win Draw Loss Fixtures

24 January 2001 Friendly	Villarreal (Spain)	1–0	(Germany) Eintracht Frankfurt	Villarreal, Spain
CET (UTC+1)	Escoda 59'			Stadium: El Madrigal; Attendance: 10,000

27 February 2001 Friendly	Villarreal (Spain)	1–2	(France) Paris Saint-Germain	Villarreal, Spain
CET (UTC+1)				Stadium: El Madrigal; Attendance: 3,000

== Competitions ==
=== Overall record ===
Competition	First match	Last match	Starting round	Final position	Record							
Competition	First match	Last match	Starting round	Final position	Pld	W	D	L	GF	GA	GD	Win %
La Liga	10 September 2000	16 June 2001	Matchday 1	3rd	36	16	7	13	58	52	+6	44.44
Copa del Rey	12 December 2000	2 January 2001	Round of 64	Round of 32	2	1	1	0	3	2	+1	50.00
Total					38	17	8	13	61	54	+7	44.74

Source: Competitions

=== La Liga ===
==== League table ====
Pos	Team	Pld	W	D	L	GF	GA	GD	Pts	Qualification or relegation
5	Valencia	38	18	9	11	55	34	+21	63 (Note: VAL 0–1 BAR; BAR 3–2 VAL)	Qualification for the UEFA Cup first round
6	Celta Vigo	38	16	11	11	51	49	+2	59	Qualification for the UEFA Cup first round
7	Villarreal	38	16	9	13	58	52	+6	57	
8	Málaga	38	16	8	14	60	61	−1	56	
9	Espanyol	38	15	7	16	46	44	+2	52	

Source: LFP
Rules for classification: 1st points; 2nd head-to-head points; 3rd head-to-head goal difference; 4th head-to-head goals scored; 5th goal difference; 6th number of goals scored; 7th Fair-play points

==== Results summary ====
Overall								Home						Away					
Pld	W	D	L	GF	GA	GD	Pts	W	D	L	GF	GA	GD	W	D	L	GF	GA	GD
38	16	9	13	58	52	+6	57	9	6	4	33	25	+8	7	3	9	25	27	−2

==== Results by round ====
Round	1	2	3	4	5	6	7	8	9	10	11	12	13	14	15	16	17	18	19	20	21	22	23	24	25	26	27	28	29	30	31	32	33	34	35	36	37	38
Ground	H	A	H	A	H	A	H	A	H	A	H	A	H	A	A	H	A	H	A	A	H	A	H	A	H	A	H	A	H	A	H	A	H	H	A	H	A	H
Result	L	W	W	D	D	L	D	L	W	W	L	L	D	W	W	D	L	W	L	W	W	W	W	L	L	D	W	L	D	L	D	W	W	L	D	W	L	W
Position	20	13	6	7	8	11	9	13	9	9	11	15	13	9	9	8	10	9	10	7	5	5	5	5	6	6	6	6	8	8	10	7	7	8	7	7	8	7

A = Away; H = Home; W = Win; D = Draw; L = Loss

==== Matches ====
10 September 2000 1	Villarreal	1–5	Rayo Vallecano	Villarreal
CEST (UTC+2)				Stadium: El Madrigal

17 September 2000 2	Alavés	0–1	Villarreal	Vitoria-Gasteiz
CEST (UTC+2)				Stadium: Mendizorrotza

24 September 2000 3	Villarreal	1–0	Oviedo	Villarreal
CEST (UTC+2)				Stadium: El Madrigal

1 October 2000 4	Valladolid	0–0	Villarreal	Vitoria-Gasteiz
CEST (UTC+2)				Stadium: Mendizorrotza

14 October 2000 5	Villarreal	1–1	Valencia	Villarreal
CEST (UTC+2)				Stadium: El Madrigal

22 October 2000 6	Málaga	2–1	Villarreal	Málaga
CEST (UTC+2)				Stadium: La Rosaleda

28 October 2000 7	Villarreal	0–0	Athletic Bilbao	Villarreal
CEST (UTC+2)				Stadium: El Madrigal

1 November 2000 8	Racing Santander	3–1	Villarreal	Santander
CEST (UTC+2)				Stadium: El Sardinero

4 November 2000 9	Villarreal	3–2	Deportivo La Coruña	Villarreal
CEST (UTC+2)				Stadium: El Madrigal

12 November 2000 10	Barcelona	1–2	Villarreal	Barcelona
CEST (UTC+2)				Stadium: Camp Nou

18 November 2000 11	Villarreal	0–1	Real Madrid	Villarreal
CEST (UTC+2)				Stadium: El Madrigal

25 November 2000 12	Mallorca	2–1	Villarreal	Palma
CEST (UTC+2)				Stadium: Camp Nou

3 December 2000 13	Villarreal	0–0	Numancia	Villarreal
CEST (UTC+2)				Stadium: El Madrigal

9 December 2000 14	Las Palmas	1–5	Villarreal	Las Palmas
CEST (UTC+2)				Stadium: Gran Canaria

16 December 2000 15	Real Sociedad	0–2	Villarreal	San Sebastián
CEST (UTC+2)				Stadium: Anoeta

20 December 2000 16	Villarreal	1–1	Zaragoza	Villarreal
CEST (UTC+2)				Stadium: El Madrigal

7 January 2001 17	Osasuna	1–0	Villarreal	Pamplona
CEST (UTC+2)				Stadium: El Sadar

14 January 2001 18	Villarreal	2–0	Celta Vigo	Villarreal
CEST (UTC+2)				Stadium: El Madrigal

21 January 2001 19	Espanyol	2–1	Villarreal	Barcelona
CEST (UTC+2)				Stadium: Olímpic Lluís Companys

28 January 2001 20	Rayo Vallecano	0–1	Villarreal	Madrid
CEST (UTC+2)				Stadium: Vallecas

4 February 2001 21	Villarreal	2–0	Alavés	Villarreal
CEST (UTC+2)				Stadium: El Madrigal

11 February 2001 22	Oviedo	1–3	Villarreal	Madrid
CEST (UTC+2)				Stadium: Carlos Tartiere

18 February 2001 23	Villarreal	2–1	Valladolid	Villarreal
CEST (UTC+2)				Stadium: El Madrigal

25 February 2001 24	Valencia	3–1	Villarreal	Valencia
CEST (UTC+2)				Stadium: Mestalla

4 March 2001 25	Villarreal	1–2	Málaga	Villarreal
CEST (UTC+2)				Stadium: El Madrigal

10 March 2001 26	Athletic Bilbao	1–1	Villarreal	Bilbao
CEST (UTC+2)				Stadium: San Mamés

18 March 2001 27	Villarreal	4–2	Racing Santander	Villarreal
CEST (UTC+2)				Stadium: El Madrigal

31 March 2001 28	Deportivo La Coruña	4–2	Villarreal	A Coruña
CEST (UTC+2)				Stadium: Riazor

8 April 2001 29	Villarreal	4–4	Barcelona	Villarreal
CEST (UTC+2)				Stadium: El Madrigal

14 April 2001 30	Real Madrid	4–0	Villarreal	Madrid
CEST (UTC+2)				Stadium: Santiago Bernabéu

22 April 2001 31	Villarreal	2–2	Mallorca	Villarreal
CEST (UTC+2)				Stadium: El Madrigal

29 April 2001 32	Numancia	1–3	Villarreal	Soria
CEST (UTC+2)				Stadium: Los Pajaritos

6 May 2001 33	Villarreal	2–1	Las Palmas	Villarreal
CEST (UTC+2)				Stadium: El Madrigal

12 May 2001 34	Villarreal	1–3	Real Sociedad	Villarreal
CEST (UTC+2)				Stadium: El Madrigal

20 May 2001 35	Zaragoza	0–0	Villarreal	Zaragoza
CEST (UTC+2)				Stadium: La Romareda

27 May 2001 36	Villarreal	2–0	Osasuna	Villarreal
CEST (UTC+2)				Stadium: El Madrigal

10 June 2001 37	Celta Vigo	1–0	Villarreal	Vigo
CEST (UTC+2)				Stadium: Balaídos

16 June 2001 38	Villarreal	4–0	Espanyol	Villarreal
CEST (UTC+2)				Stadium: El Madrigal

=== Copa del Rey ===
12 December 2000 Round of 64	Burriana	1–2 (a.e.t.)	Villarreal	Burriana
CET (UTC+1)				Stadium: San Fernando

2 January 2001 Round of 32	Granada	1–1 (a.e.t.) (4–2 p)	Villarreal	Granada
CET (UTC+1)				Stadium: Los Cármenes
