= Luis García (footballer, born 1979) =

Spanish footballer

Personal information
- Full name: Luis García Conde
- Date of birth: 23 April 1979 (age 47)
- Place of birth: Toledo, Spain
- Height: 1.86 m (6 ft 1 in)
- Position: Goalkeeper

Youth career
- 1992–1998: Atlético Madrid

Senior career*
| Years | Team | Apps | (Gls) |
| 1998–2002 | Atlético Madrid B | 38 | (0) |
| 2001–2002 | → Xerez (loan) | 22 | (0) |
| 2002–2004 | Numancia | 68 | (0) |
| 2004–2005 | Zaragoza | 37 | (0) |
| 2005–2008 | Getafe | 28 | (0) |
| 2008 | → Celta (loan) | 0 | (0) |
| 2008–2011 | Tenerife | 27 | (0) |
| 2011–2013 | Huesca | 69 | (0) |
| 2013–2014 | Rayo Majadahonda | 11 | (0) |
| Total | | 300 | (0) |
- * Club domestic league appearances and goals

Luis García Conde (born 23 April 1979) is a Spanish former professional footballer who played as a goalkeeper.

== Club career ==
Born in Toledo, Castilla–La Mancha, García was developed at Atlético Madrid, but never made it past their reserves. He went on to play with Xerez CD and CD Numancia in the Segunda División, achieving promotion with the latter.

For the 2004–05 season, García moved to La Liga with Real Zaragoza after having been signed as a replacement for César Láinez, who had been forced to retire from football at just 27. He played all but one league game and conceded 53 goals, also appearing in ten UEFA Cup matches as the Aragonese exited in the round of 16 (50 in all competitions).

From 2005 to 2007, García represented Madrid outskirts club Getafe CF: after being first-choice throughout his first year he backed up Argentine Roberto Abbondanzieri in the second, being restricted to Copa del Rey appearances as the team went all the way to finish runners-up to Sevilla FC.

García was not registered for the first part of the 2007–08 campaign and, in January 2008, he was loaned to RC Celta de Vigo where he also would not make one single appearance. For 2008–09 he stayed in division two, joining CD Tenerife on a three-year contract.

After only four games over his last two seasons in the Canary Islands, with two consecutive relegations, the 32-year-old García signed with second-tier SD Huesca in early November 2011. He made his debut on the 12th, in a 2–2 home draw against Real Valladolid.

== Career statistics ==
Appearances and goals by club, season and competition
| Club | Season | League | | | Copa del Rey | | Europe | | Other | | Total | |
| Club | Season | Division | Apps | Goals | Apps | Goals | Apps | Goals | Apps | Goals | Apps | Goals |
|---|---|---|---|---|---|---|---|---|---|---|---|---|
| Atlético Madrid B | 1999–2000 | Segunda División | 3 | 0 | — | | — | | — | | 3 | 0 |
| Atlético Madrid B | 2000–01 | Segunda División B | 35 | 0 | — | | — | | 4 (Note: Appearances in Segunda División B play-offs) | 0 | 39 | 0 |
| Atlético Madrid B | Total | | 38 | 0 | — | | — | | 4 | 0 | 42 | 0 |
| Xerez (loan) | 2001–02 | Segunda División | 22 | 0 | 0 | 0 | — | | — | | 22 | 0 |
| Numancia | 2002–03 | Segunda División | 26 | 0 | 1 | 0 | — | | — | | 27 | 0 |
| Numancia | 2003–04 | Segunda División | 42 | 0 | 0 | 0 | — | | — | | 42 | 0 |
| Numancia | Total | | 68 | 0 | 1 | 0 | — | | — | | 69 | 0 |
| Zaragoza | 2004–05 | La Liga | 37 | 0 | 1 | 0 | 10 (Note: Appearances in UEFA Europa League) | 0 | 2 (Note: Appearances in Supercopa de España) | 0 | 50 | 0 |
| Getafe | 2005–06 | La Liga | 25 | 0 | 1 | 0 | — | | — | | 26 | 0 |
| Getafe | 2006–07 | La Liga | 3 | 0 | 8 | 0 | — | | — | | 11 | 0 |
| Getafe | Total | | 28 | 0 | 9 | 0 | — | | — | | 37 | 0 |
| Celta (loan) | 2007–08 | La Liga | 0 | 0 | — | | — | | — | | 0 | 0 |
| Tenerife | 2008–09 | Segunda División | 23 | 0 | 0 | 0 | — | | — | | 23 | 0 |
| Tenerife | 2009–10 | La Liga | 0 | 0 | 2 | 0 | — | | — | | 2 | 0 |
| Tenerife | 2010–11 | Segunda División | 4 | 0 | 0 | 0 | — | | — | | 4 | 0 |
| Tenerife | Total | | 27 | 0 | 2 | 0 | — | | — | | 29 | 0 |
| Huesca | 2011–12 | Segunda División | 30 | 0 | — | | — | | — | | 30 | 0 |
| Huesca | 2012–13 | Segunda División | 39 | 0 | 1 | 0 | — | | — | | 40 | 0 |
| Huesca | Total | | 69 | 0 | 1 | 0 | — | | — | | 70 | 0 |
| Rayo Majadahonda | 2013–14 | Tercera División | 11 | 0 | — | | — | | — | | 11 | 0 |
| Career total | | | 300 | 0 | 14 | 0 | 10 | 0 | 6 | 0 | 330 | 0 |

== Honours ==
Zaragoza

- Supercopa de España: 2004
