= 2003–04 Levante UD season =

Levante
2003–04 season
- President: Antonio Blasco Muñoz
- Head coach: Manuel Preciado
- Stadium: Ciutat de València
- Segunda División: 1st (promoted)
- Copa del Rey: Round of 16
- Top goalscorer: League: Gustavo Reggi (12); All: Alberto Rivera (13)

The 2003–04 season was the 95th season in the history of Levante UD and the club's fifth consecutive season in the second division of Spanish football. In addition to the domestic league, Levante participated in this season's edition of the Copa del Rey.

== Players ==
- Mora
- Aizpurúa
- Ruiz Caba
- Juanra
- Pinillos
- Descarga
- Rubiales
- Félix

== Pre-season and friendlies ==
Win Draw Loss

2 August 2003 Friendly	Biescas (Spain)	0–11	(Spain) Levante
18:00 CEST (UTC+2)

4 August 2003 Friendly	Sabinanigo (Spain)	0–7	(Spain) Levante
18:30 CEST (UTC+2)

7 August 2003 Friendly	Levante (Spain)	0–2	(Spain) Getafe
21:45 CEST (UTC+2)

9 August 2003 Friendly	Levante UD FS (Spain)	0–1	(Spain) Levante
21:00 CEST (UTC+2)

12 August 2003 Friendly	Pego CF (Spain)	0–4	(Spain) Levante
20:30 CEST (UTC+2)

13 August 2003 Friendly	CD Denia (Spain)	2–3	(Spain) Levante
20:45 CEST (UTC+2)

16 August 2003 Friendly	Levante (Spain)	4–1	(Spain) At. Levante
10:00 CEST (UTC+2)

20 August 2003 Friendly	Conquense (Spain)	0–1	(Spain) Levante
20:00 CEST (UTC+2)

22 August 2003 Friendly	Levante (Spain)	0–3	(Spain) Ciudad de Murcia
21:45 CEST (UTC+2)

== Competitions ==
=== Overall record ===
Competition	First match	Last match	Starting round	Final position	Record							
Competition	First match	Last match	Starting round	Final position	Pld	W	D	L	GF	GA	GD	Win %
Segunda División	31 August 2003	19 June 2004	Matchday 1	Winners	42	22	13	7	59	33	+26	52.38
Copa del Rey	8 October 2003	14 January 2004	Round of 64	Round of 16	4	3	0	1	5	3	+2	75.00
Total					46	25	13	8	64	36	+28	54.35

Source: Competitions

=== Segunda División ===
==== League table ====
Pos	Team	Pld	W	D	L	GF	GA	GD	Pts	Promotion or relegation
1	Levante (C, P)	42	22	13	7	59	33	+26	79	Promotion to La Liga
2	Getafe (P)	42	20	16	6	55	38	+17	76 (Note: NUM 0-0 GET; GET 2-1 NUM)	Promotion to La Liga
3	Numancia (P)	42	22	10	10	60	30	+30	76	Promotion to La Liga
4	Alavés	42	20	14	8	48	32	+16	74	
5	Sporting Gijón	42	20	10	12	58	40	+18	70	

Source: LFP - Liga Adelante
Rules for classification: 1st points; 2nd head-to-head points; 3rd head-to-head goal difference; 4th head-to-head goals scored; 5th goal difference; 6th number of goals scored; 7th Fair-play points
(C) Champions; (P) Promoted

==== Results summary ====
Overall								Home						Away					
Pld	W	D	L	GF	GA	GD	Pts	W	D	L	GF	GA	GD	W	D	L	GF	GA	GD
42	22	13	7	59	33	+26	79	14	6	1	32	12	+20	8	7	6	27	21	+6

Source: Segunda División

==== Results by round ====
Round	1	2	3	4	5	6	7	8	9	10	11	12	13	14	15	16	17	18	19	20	21	22	23	24	25	26	27	28	29	30	31	32	33	34	35	36	37	38	39	40	41	42
Ground	A	H	A	H	A	H	A	H	A	H	A	H	A	H	A	H	A	H	H	A	H	H	A	H	A	H	A	H	A	H	A	H	A	H	A	H	A	H	A	A	H	A
Result	W	D	D	W	D	W	D	W	L	W	D	D	W	D	D	W	W	W	L	L	W	W	L	W	L	D	L	W	W	W	W	D	L	W	D	D	W	W	W	W	W	D
Position																																										

Source: Segunda División
A = Away; H = Home; W = Win; D = Draw; L = Loss

==== Matches ====
31 August 2003 1	Rayo Vallecano	0–2	Levante	Madrid
--:-- CEST (UTC+2)				Stadium: Campo de Fútbol de Vallecas

6 September 2003 2	Levante	1–1	Elche	Valencia
--:-- CET (UTC+1)				Stadium: Ciutat de València

14 September 2003 3	Leganés	0–0	Levante	Leganés
--:-- CEST (UTC+2)				Stadium: Estadio Municipal de Butarque

21 September 2003 4	Levante	4–0	Numancia	Valencia
--:-- CET (UTC+1)				Stadium: Ciutat de València

28 September 2003 5	Ciudad de Murcia	0–0	Levante	Murcia
--:-- CEST (UTC+2)				Stadium: La Condomina

5 October 2003 6	Levante	1–0	Eibar	Valencia
--:-- CET (UTC+1)				Stadium: Ciutat de València

11 October 2003 7	Tenerife	1–1	Levante	Santa Cruz de Tenerife
--:-- CEST (UTC+2)				Stadium: Heliodoro Rodríguez López

18 October 2003 8	Levante	2–1	Sporting Gijón	Valencia
--:-- CET (UTC+1)				Stadium: Ciutat de València

26 October 2003 9	Almería	1–0	Levante	Almería
--:-- CET (UTC+1)				Stadium: Juan Rojas

2 November 2003 10	Levante	1–0	Málaga B	Valencia
--:-- CET (UTC+1)				Stadium: Ciutat de València

9 November 2003 11	Getafe	0–0	Levante	Getafe
--:-- CET (UTC+1)				Stadium: Coliseum Alfonso Pérez

15 November 2003 12	Levante	0–0	Alavés	Valencia
14:00 CEST (UTC+2)				Stadium: Ciutat de València

22 November 2003 13	Algeciras	0–1	Levante	Algeciras
--:-- CEST (UTC+2)				Stadium: Nuevo Mirador

30 November 2003 14	Levante	0–0	Recreativo	Valencia
--:-- CEST (UTC+2)				Stadium: Ciutat de València

7 December 2003 15	Córdoba	1–1	Levante	Córdoba
--:-- CEST (UTC+2)				Stadium: Nuevo Arcángel

13 December 2003 16	Levante	2–1	Salamanca	Valencia
--:-- CEST (UTC+2)				Stadium: Ciutat de València

20 December 2003 17	Las Palmas	1–2	Levante	Las Palmas
--:-- CET (UTC+1)				Stadium: Gran Canaria

4 January 2004 18	Levante	2–1	Cádiz	Valencia
--:-- CEST (UTC+2)				Stadium: Ciutat de València

11 January 2004 19	Levante	0–1	Xerez	Valencia
--:-- CEST (UTC+2)				Stadium: Ciutat de València

18 January 2004 20	Poli Ejido	1–0	Levante	El Ejido
--:-- CEST (UTC+2)				Stadium: Santo Domingo

24 January 2004 21	Levante	2–1	Terrassa	Valencia
--:-- CEST (UTC+2)				Stadium: Ciutat de València

1 February 2004 22	Levante	3–1	Rayo Vallecano	Valencia
--:-- CEST (UTC+2)				Stadium: Ciutat de València

7 February 2004 23	Elche	1–0	Levante	Elche
--:-- CET (UTC+1)				Stadium: Manuel Martínez Valero

15 February 2004 24	Levante	1–0	Leganés	Valencia
--:-- CEST (UTC+2)				Stadium: Ciutat de València

22 February 2004 25	Numancia	3–1	Levante	Soria
--:-- CET (UTC+1)				Stadium: Los Pajaritos

29 February 2004 26	Levante	0–0	Ciudad de Murcia	Valencia
--:-- CEST (UTC+2)				Stadium: Ciutat de València

6 March 2004 27	Eibar	2–0	Levante	Eibar
--:-- CET (UTC+1)				Stadium: Ipurua

13 March 2004 28	Levante	1–0	Tenerife	Valencia
--:-- CEST (UTC+2)				Stadium: Ciutat de València

21 March 2004 29	Sporting Gijón	1–2	Levante	Gijón
--:-- CEST (UTC+2)				Stadium: El Molinón

28 March 2004 30	Levante	2–1	Almería	Valencia
--:-- CEST (UTC+2)				Stadium: Ciutat de València

3 April 2004 31	Málaga B	1–5	Levante	Málaga
--:-- CEST (UTC+2)				Stadium: La Rosaleda

11 April 2004 32	Levante	1–1	Getafe	Valencia
--:-- CEST (UTC+2)				Stadium: Ciutat de València

18 April 2004 33	Alavés	3–2	Levante	Vitoria-Gasteiz
14:00 CEST (UTC+2)				Stadium: Mendizorrotza

25 April 2004 34	Levante	3–1	Algeciras	Valencia
--:-- CEST (UTC+2)				Stadium: Ciutat de València

2 May 2004 35	Recreativo	0–0	Levante	Huelva
--:-- CET (UTC+1)				Stadium: Nuevo Colombino

8 May 2004 36	Levante	2–2	Córdoba	Valencia
--:-- CEST (UTC+2)				Stadium: Ciutat de València

16 May 2004 37	Salamanca	0–1	Levante	Villares de la Reina
--:-- CET (UTC+1)				Stadium: Helmántico

23 May 2004 38	Levante	2–0	Las Palmas	Valencia
--:-- CEST (UTC+2)				Stadium: Ciutat de València

30 May 2004 39	Cádiz	0–3	Levante	Cádiz
--:-- CET (UTC+1)				Stadium: Ramón de Carranza

5 June 2004 40	Xerez	1–2	Levante	Jerez de la Frontera
--:-- CET (UTC+1)				Stadium: Chapín

13 June 2004 41	Levante	2–0	Poli Ejido	Valencia
--:-- CEST (UTC+2)				Stadium: Ciutat de València

19 June 2004 42	Terrassa	4–4	Levante	Terrassa
--:-- CET (UTC+1)				Stadium: Olímpic de Terrassa

=== Copa del Rey ===
8 October 2003 Round of 64	Terrassa	0–1	Levante	Terrassa
CEST (UTC+2)

17 December 2003 Round of 32	Levante	2–0	Mallorca	Valencia
CET (UTC+1)

8 January 2004 Round of 16; First leg	Levante	1–0	Barcelona	Valencia
CET (UTC+1)

14 January 2004 Round of 16; Second leg	Barcelona	3–1 (3–2 agg.)	Levante	Barcelona
CET (UTC+1)				Stadium: Camp Nou
