= Luis Cuartero =

Spanish retired footballer

Personal information
- Full name: Luis Carlos Cuartero Laforga
- Date of birth: 17 August 1975 (age 51)
- Place of birth: Zaragoza, Spain
- Height: 1.80 m (5 ft 11 in)
- Position: Defender

Youth career
- Zaragoza

Senior career*
Years	Team	Apps	(Gls)
1992–1995	Zaragoza B	77	(1)
1993–2009	Zaragoza	190	(0)
Total		267	(1)

International career
1991–1992	Spain U16	9	(0)
1992	Spain U17	4	(0)
1993–1994	Spain U18	22	(0)
1995	Spain U19	2	(0)
1995	Spain U20	6	(0)
1996–1998	Spain U21	6	(0)
1997	Spain U23	4	(0)
- * Club domestic league appearances and goals

Luis Carlos Cuartero Laforga (born 17 August 1975) is a Spanish former footballer who played as a right-back or a central defender.

His professional career, hindered by several serious injuries, was devoted to a single club, Real Zaragoza.

== Club career ==
Cuartero was born in Zaragoza, Aragon. He made his senior debut with his hometown club Real Zaragoza on 20 June 1993 in a 2–2 away draw against Atlético Madrid, aged 17, and went on to appear in 178 La Liga games, plus the 2002–03 season in the Segunda División.

From 2006 to 2009, however, Cuartero would total three league appearances, severely hindered by knee injuries. Never more than a utility player, his best league output came in the 2003–04 campaign, when he featured in 24 matches for a final 12th place; he added seven appearances in a victorious run in the Copa del Rey, including 120 minutes of the 3–2 win against Real Madrid in the final.

Cuartero retired aged 33 at the end of 2008–09, with the team again in the second tier. He remained connected to Zaragoza until October 2022, mainly as general manager.

== Honours ==
Zaragoza

- Copa del Rey: 2000–01, 2003–04
- Supercopa de España: 2004

Spain U21

- UEFA European Under-21 Championship: 1998

== See also ==
- List of one-club men
