= 2003–04 CA Osasuna season =

Osasuna
2003–04 season
- President: Patxi Izco
- Head coach: Javier Aguirre
- Stadium: El Sadar
- La Liga: 13th
- Copa del Rey: Round of 16
- Top goalscorer: League: John Aloisi (6); All: John Aloisi (8)
- Biggest win: Real Madrid 0–3 Osasuna
- Biggest defeat: Osasuna 0–2 Valencia; Deportivo La Coruña 2–0 Osasuna; Osasuna 1–3 Espanyol

The 2003–04 season was the 83rd season in the existence of CA Osasuna and the club's fourth consecutive season in the top flight of Spanish football. In addition to the domestic league, Osasuna participated in this season's edition of the Copa del Rey. The season covered the period from 1 July 2003 to 30 June 2004.

== Competitions ==
=== Overview ===
Competition	First match	Last match	Starting round	Final position	Record							
Competition	First match	Last match	Starting round	Final position	Pld	W	D	L	GF	GA	GD	Win %
La Liga	30 August 2003	23 May 2004	Matchday 1	13th	38	11	15	12	38	37	+1	28.95
Copa del Rey	8 October 2004	14 January 2004	Round of 64	Round of 16	4	2	1	1	6	5	+1	50.00
Total					42	13	16	13	44	42	+2	30.95

Source: Competitions

=== La Liga ===
==== League table ====
Pos	Team	Pld	W	D	L	GF	GA	GD	Pts	Qualification or relegation
11	Mallorca	38	15	6	17	54	66	−12	51 (Note: MLG 3–1 MLL; MLL 2–1 MLG)	
12	Zaragoza	38	13	9	16	46	55	−9	48 (Note: OSA 0–1 ZAR; ZAR 1–0 OSA)	Qualification for the UEFA Cup first round (Note: Zaragoza entered UEFA Cup as winners of 2003–04 Copa del Rey.)
13	Osasuna	38	11	15	12	38	37	+1	48	
14	Albacete	38	13	8	17	40	48	−8	47	
15	Real Sociedad	38	11	13	14	49	53	−4	46	

Source: LFP
Rules for classification: 1st points; 2nd head-to-head points; 3rd head-to-head goal difference; 4th head-to-head goals scored; 5th goal difference; 6th number of goals scored; 7th Fair-play points

==== Results summary ====
Overall								Home						Away					
Pld	W	D	L	GF	GA	GD	Pts	W	D	L	GF	GA	GD	W	D	L	GF	GA	GD
38	11	15	12	38	37	+1	48	6	7	6	24	24	0	5	8	6	14	13	+1

Source: La Liga

==== Results by round ====
Round	1	2	3	4	5	6	7	8	9	10	11	12	13	14	15	16	17	18	19	20	21	22	23	24	25	26	27	28	29	30	31	32	33	34	35	36	37	38
Ground	A	H	H	A	H	A	H	A	H	A	H	A	H	A	H	A	H	A	H	H	A	A	H	A	H	A	H	A	H	A	H	A	H	A	H	A	H	A
Result	W	L	W	D	W	D	W	L	W	L	D	D	D	W	W	D	L	D	D	D	W	D	L	L	D	W	D	D	W	D	D	W	L	L	L	L	L	L
Position	1	9	5	6	4	4	4	4	4	4	6	6	6	4	4	4	4	4	6	6	5	6	7	9	9	7	7	7	7	6	6	5	6	6	8	10	11	13

Source: La Liga
A = Away; H = Home; W = Win; D = Draw; L = Loss

==== Matches ====
30 August 2003 1	Albacete	0–2	Osasuna	Albacete
CEST (UTC+2)				Stadium: Carlos Belmonte

2 September 2003 2	Osasuna	0–1	Valencia	Pamplona
CEST (UTC+2)				Stadium: El Sadar

14 September 2003 3	Osasuna	1–0	Atlético Madrid	Pamplona
CEST (UTC+2)				Stadium: El Sadar

20 September 2003 4	Barcelona	1–1	Osasuna	Barcelona
CEST (UTC+2)				Stadium: Camp Nou

27 September 2003 5	Osasuna	3–2	Deportivo La Coruña	Pamplona
CEST (UTC+2)				Stadium: El Sadar

5 October 2003 6	Mallorca	1–1	Osasuna	Palma
CEST (UTC+2)				Stadium: Estadi de Son Moix

19 October 2003 7	Osasuna	2–1	Murcia	Pamplona
CEST (UTC+2)				Stadium: El Sadar

26 October 2003 8	Real Sociedad	1–0	Osasuna	San Sebastián
CEST (UTC+2)				Stadium: Anoeta Stadium

29 October 2003 9	Osasuna	2–0	Real Betis	Pamplona
CEST (UTC+2)				Stadium: El Sadar

2 November 2003 10	Villarreal	1–0	Osasuna	Villarreal
CET (UTC+1)				Stadium: El Madrigal

9 November 2003 11	Osasuna	1–1	Valladolid	Pamplona
CET (UTC+1)				Stadium: El Sadar

23 November 2003 12	Málaga	0–0	Osasuna	Málaga
CET (UTC+1)				Stadium: La Rosaleda

29 November 2003 13	Osasuna	1–1	Real Madrid	Pamplona
CET (UTC+1)				Stadium: El Sadar

3 December 2003 14	Espanyol	0–1	Osasuna	Barcelona
CET (UTC+1)				Stadium: Estadi Olímpic Lluís Companys

6 December 2003 15	Osasuna	3–2	Celta Vigo	Pamplona
CET (UTC+1)				Stadium: El Sadar

14 December 2003 16	Racing Santander	0–0	Osasuna	Santander
CET (UTC+1)				Stadium: El Sardinero

21 December 2003 17	Osasuna	0–1	Zaragoza	Pamplona
CET (UTC+1)				Stadium: El Sadar

4 January 2004 18	Athletic Bilbao	1–1	Osasuna	Bilbao
CET (UTC+1)				Stadium: San Mamés

11 January 2004 19	Osasuna	1–1	Sevilla	Pamplona
CET (UTC+1)				Stadium: El Sadar

18 January 2004 20	Osasuna	1–1	Albacete	Pamplona
CET (UTC+1)				Stadium: El Sadar

25 January 2004 21	Valencia	0–1	Osasuna	Valencia
CET (UTC+1)				Stadium: Mestalla

31 January 2004 22	Atlético Madrid	1–1	Osasuna	Madrid
CET (UTC+1)				Stadium: Vicente Calderón

8 February 2004 23	Osasuna	1–2	Barcelona	Pamplona
CET (UTC+1)				Stadium: El Sadar

15 February 2004 24	Deportivo La Coruña	2–0	Osasuna	A Coruña
CET (UTC+1)				Stadium: Riazor

22 February 2004 25	Osasuna	1–1	Mallorca	Pamplona
CET (UTC+1)				Stadium: El Sadar

29 February 2004 26	Murcia	0–1	Osasuna	Murcia
CET (UTC+1)				Stadium: Estadio de La Condomina

6 March 2004 27	Osasuna	1–1	Real Sociedad	Pamplona
CET (UTC+1)				Stadium: El Sadar

14 March 2004 28	Real Betis	1–1	Osasuna	Seville
CET (UTC+1)				Stadium: Benito Villamarín

21 March 2004 29	Osasuna	2–1	Villarreal	Pamplona
CET (UTC+1)				Stadium: El Sadar

28 March 2004 30	Valladolid	1–1	Osasuna	Valladolid
CEST (UTC+2)				Stadium: José Zorrilla

4 April 2004 31	Osasuna	1–1	Málaga	Pamplona
CET (UTC+1)				Stadium: El Sadar

11 April 2004 32	Real Madrid	0–3	Osasuna	Madrid
CEST (UTC+2)				Stadium: Santiago Bernabéu

18 April 2004 33	Osasuna	1–3	Espanyol	Pamplona
CEST (UTC+2)				Stadium: El Sadar

25 April 2004 34	Celta Vigo	1–0	Osasuna	Vigo
CEST (UTC+2)				Stadium: Balaídos

2 May 2004 35	Osasuna	1–2	Racing Santander	Pamplona
CEST (UTC+2)				Stadium: El Sadar

9 May 2004 36	Zaragoza	1–0	Osasuna	Zaragoza
CEST (UTC+2)				Stadium: La Romareda

16 May 2004 37	Osasuna	1–2	Athletic Bilbao	Pamplona
CEST (UTC+2)				Stadium: El Sadar; Referee: Alfonso Pérez Burrull

23 May 2004 38	Sevilla	1–0	Osasuna	Seville
CEST (UTC+2)				Stadium: Ramón Sánchez Pizjuán; Referee: José Javier Losantos Omar

=== Copa del Rey ===
8 October 2003 Round of 64	Real Unión	0–2	Osasuna	Irun
CEST (UTC+2)				Stadium: Stadium Gal; Referee: Fernando Teixeira Vitienes

17 December 2003 Round of 32	Cádiz	1–2	Osasuna	Cádiz
CET (UTC+1)				Stadium: Ramón de Carranza; Referee: Carlos Megía Dávila

7 January 2004 Round of 16; First leg	Valencia	2–2	Osasuna	Valencia
CET (UTC+1)				Stadium: Mestalla; Referee: Antonio Rubinos Pérez

14 January 2004 Round of 16; First leg	Osasuna	0–2 (2–4 agg.)	Valencia	Pamplona
CET (UTC+1)				Stadium: El Sadar; Referee: Miguel Ángel Pérez Lasa
