= Milito =

Milito may refer to:

- Diego Milito (born 1979), Argentine retired football player, who played as a striker for Real Zaragoza, Genoa, Inter and Racing Club.
- Gabriel Milito (born 1980), Argentine retired football player, who played as a defender for Real Zaragoza, FC Barcelona and Independiente.
