= 2004 Supercopa de España =

Zaragoza	Valencia
3	2
- on aggregate

First leg
Zaragoza	Valencia
0	1
- Date: 21 August 2004
- Venue: La Romareda, Zaragoza
- Referee: Julián Rodríguez Santiago
- Attendance: 25,000

Second leg
Valencia	Zaragoza
1	3
- Date: 24 August 2004
- Venue: Mestalla, Valencia
- Referee: Carlos Megía Dávila
- Attendance: 35,000

The 2004 Supercopa de España was a two-legged Spanish football tie played on 21 and 24 August 2004. It was contested by 2003–04 Copa del Rey winners Zaragoza and 2003–04 La Liga winners Valencia. Zaragoza won the title 3–2 on aggregate.

== Match details ==
=== First leg ===
21 August 2004
22:00 CET

Real Zaragoza	0–1	Valencia
		Vicente 61'

La Romareda, Zaragoza
Attendance: 25,000
Referee: Julián Rodríguez Santiago

Real Zaragoza	Valencia

GK	13	(Spain) Luís García
RB	4	(Spain) Luis Cuartero (c)	(yellow card) 60'
CB	5	(Brazil) Álvaro	(yellow card) 76'
CB	6	(Argentina) Gabriel Milito	(yellow card) 4'
LB	12	(Paraguay) Delio Toledo
RM	7	(Argentina) Luciano Galletti		(substituted off) 79'
CM	17	(Spain) José María Movilla		(substituted off) 80'
CM	26	(Spain) Alberto Zapater
LM	10	(Brazil) Sávio
CF	9	(Spain) David Villa
CF	19	(Spain) Javi Moreno	(yellow card) 20'	(substituted off) 67'
Substitutes:
FW	18	(Serbia and Montenegro) Goran Drulić	(yellow card) 85'	(substituted on) 67'
MF	8	(Spain) Cani		(substituted on) 79'
MF	20	(Spain) David Generelo		(substituted on) 80'
Manager:
(Spain) Víctor Muñoz

GK	1	(Spain) Santiago Cañizares
RB	23	(Spain) Curro Torres	(yellow card) 31'
CB	17	(Spain) David Navarro
CB	2	(Argentina) Mauricio Pellegrino
LB	15	(Italy) Amedeo Carboni
RM	19	(Spain) Francisco Rufete		(substituted off) 88'
CM	6	(Spain) David Albelda (c)
CM	8	(Spain) Rubén Baraja
LM	14	(Spain) Vicente	(yellow card) 62'	(substituted off) 85'
CF	10	(Spain) Miguel Ángel Angulo
CF	11	(Italy) Marco Di Vaio		(substituted off) 69'
Substitutes:
FW	20	(Spain) Mista		(substituted on) 69'
FW	9	(Italy) Bernardo Corradi		(substituted on) 85'
MF	7	(Italy) Stefano Fiore		(substituted on) 88'
Manager:
(Italy) Claudio Ranieri

=== Second leg ===
24 August 2004
22:00 CET

Valencia	1–3	Real Zaragoza
Corradi 53'		Álvaro 11'; Galletti 33'; Javi Moreno 82'

Estadio Mestalla, Valencia
Attendance: 35,000
Referee: Carlos Megía Dávila

Valencia	Real Zaragoza

GK	1	(Spain) Santiago Cañizares
RB	12	(Portugal) Marco Caneira
CB	17	(Spain) David Navarro	(yellow card) 45'
CB	2	(Argentina) Mauricio Pellegrino	(yellow card) 80'
LB	15	(Italy) Amedeo Carboni
RM	19	(Spain) Francisco Rufete		(substituted off) 46'
CM	6	(Spain) David Albelda (c)
CM	8	(Spain) Rubén Baraja		(substituted off) 46'
LM	7	(Italy) Stefano Fiore
CF	9	(Italy) Bernardo Corradi		(substituted off) 65'
CF	20	(Spain) Mista
Substitutes:
MF	10	(Spain) Miguel Ángel Angulo	(yellow card) 70'	(substituted on) 46'
MF	21	(Argentina) Pablo Aimar		(substituted on) 46'
FW	18	(Spain) Xisco		(substituted on) 65'
Manager:
(Italy) Claudio Ranieri

GK	13	(Spain) Luís García
RB	4	(Spain) Luis Cuartero (c)
CB	5	(Brazil) Álvaro
CB	6	(Argentina) Gabriel Milito
LB	12	(Paraguay) Delio Toledo	(yellow card) 19'
RM	7	(Argentina) Luciano Galletti		(substituted off) 71'
CM	17	(Spain) José María Movilla
CM	26	(Spain) Alberto Zapater	(yellow card) 57'	(substituted off) 59'
LM	10	(Brazil) Sávio
CF	9	(Spain) David Villa		(substituted off) 56'
CF	19	(Spain) Javi Moreno
Substitutes:
MF	8	(Spain) Cani		(substituted on) 56'
MF	20	(Spain) David Generelo		(substituted on) 59'
MF	23	(Spain) Fernando Soriano		(substituted on) 71'
Manager:
(Spain) Víctor Muñoz

== See also ==
- 2004–05 La Liga
- 2004–05 Copa del Rey
- 2004–05 Real Zaragoza season
- 2004–05 Valencia CF season
