= César Láinez =

Spanish footballer and manager

Personal information
- Full name: César Láinez Sanjuán
- Date of birth: 10 April 1977 (age 49)
- Place of birth: Zaragoza, Spain
- Height: 1.82 m (6 ft 0 in)
- Position: Goalkeeper

Youth career
- Zaragoza

Senior career*
Years	Team	Apps	(Gls)
1994–1998	Zaragoza B	77	(0)
1998–2004	Zaragoza	103	(0)
1999	→ Villarreal (loan)	3	(0)
Total		183	(0)

International career
1994	Spain U18	2	(0)
1997	Spain U20	5	(0)

Managerial career
- 2014–2017: Zaragoza B
- 2017: Zaragoza
- 2017–2018: Zaragoza B
- 2019: Conquense
- 2019–2020: Teruel
- * Club domestic league appearances and goals

César Láinez Sanjuán (born 10 April 1977) is a Spanish retired professional footballer who played as a goalkeeper, and is the manager of CD Teruel.

He played 69 La Liga games during six seasons, with Zaragoza and Villarreal.

== Club career ==
A Real Zaragoza youth graduate, Zaragoza-born Láinez made his professional debut with its B-side, but struggled initially to find a first-team place. In January 1999 he served a six-month loan stint at Villarreal CF, playing three La Liga matches as the season ended in relegation.

After his return to Zaragoza, Láinez had to wait until the 2001–02 campaign to become first-choice, but his team would again be relegated. He was instrumental in the Aragonese club's immediate promotion, and subsequently helped it finish in a comfortable 12th place, also conquering the Copa del Rey after an extra time win against Real Madrid.

Láinez spent the entire 2004–05 recovering from knee surgery, and ultimately retired from football in May 2005, at only 28. He subsequently became a sports commentator for local TV channels.

Láinez returned to his lifetime club Zaragoza on 9 October 2014, being appointed manager of the reserves. On 19 March 2017 he replaced Raül Agné at the helm of the first team, who now competed in Segunda División.

On 9 June 2017, after managing to avoid relegation with the main squad, Láinez signed a new three-year contract with the reserve side.

== Career statistics ==
Appearances and goals by club, season and competition
Club	Season	League			National cup		Europe		Other		Total	
Club	Season	Division	Apps	Goals	Apps	Goals	Apps	Goals	Apps	Goals	Apps	Goals
Zaragoza B	1994–95	Segunda División B	12	0	—		—		—		12	0
Zaragoza B	1996–97	Segunda División B	37	0	—		—		—		37	0
Zaragoza B	1997–98	Segunda División B	28	0	—		—		—		28	0
Zaragoza B	Total		77	0	—		—		—		77	0
Zaragoza	1998–99	La Liga	0	0	0	0	—		—		0	0
Zaragoza	1999–2000	La Liga	2	0	0	0	—		—		2	0
Zaragoza	2000–01	La Liga	3	0	3	0	0	0	—		6	0
Zaragoza	2001–02	La Liga	30	0	1	0	3	0	2	0	36	0
Zaragoza	2002–03	Segunda División	37	0	1	0	—		—		38	0
Zaragoza	2003–04	La Liga	31	0	8	0	—		—		39	0
Zaragoza	2004–05	La Liga	0	0	0	0	0	0	0	0	0	0
Zaragoza	Total		103	0	13	0	3	0	2	0	121	0
Villarreal (loan)	1998–99	La Liga	3	0	0	0	—		0	0	3	0
Career total			183	0	13	0	3	0	2	0	201	0

== Managerial statistics ==
As of 22 December 2019

Managerial record by team and tenure
Team	Nat	From	To	Record								Ref
Team	Nat	From	To	G	W	D	L	GF	GA	GD	Win %	Ref
Zaragoza B	(Spain)	9 October 2014	19 March 2017	105	54	22	29	168	101	+67	51.43	
Zaragoza	(Spain)	19 March 2017	11 June 2017	12	3	6	3	12	10	+2	25.00	
Zaragoza B	(Spain)	11 June 2017	11 June 2018	38	3	11	24	33	69	−36	7.89	
Conquense	(Spain)	15 January 2019	23 May 2019	18	4	7	7	13	18	−5	22.22	
Teruel	(Spain)	28 June 2019	Present	18	13	4	1	31	9	+22	72.22	
Total				191	77	50	64	257	207	+50	40.31	—

== Honours ==
Zaragoza

- Copa del Rey: 2000–01, 2003–04
