= Escoda =

Escoda may refer to:

- Sabina Shoal, known in the Philippines as Escoda Shoal, atoll in the South China Sea
- Gerard Escoda (disambiguation), multiple people
- Rosa Escoda, actor in Line of Duty, Boiling Point, and After Everything
- Josefa Llanes Escoda (1898–1945), Filipino heroine and suffragist
