= Gerard Escoda =

Gerard Escoda is the name of:

- Gerard Escoda (alpine skier), Andorran skier
- Gerard Escoda (footballer), Spanish footballer
