= David Generelo =

Spanish footballer (born 1982)

Personal information
- Full name: David Generelo Miranda
- Date of birth: 11 August 1982 (age 44)
- Place of birth: Badajoz, Spain
- Height: 1.83 m (6 ft 0 in)
- Position: Midfielder

Team information
- Current team: Valladolid (assistant)

Youth career
- 1994–1999: Badajoz

Senior career*
Years	Team	Apps	(Gls)
1999–2000	Badajoz B	19	(2)
1999	Badajoz	0	(0)
2000–2003	Zaragoza B	116	(5)
2002–2009	Zaragoza	100	(7)
2006–2007	→ Gimnàstic (loan)	26	(0)
2009–2013	Elche	105	(8)
2014	Mallorca	14	(0)
2014–2015	Oviedo	28	(3)
Total		408	(25)

Managerial career
- 2016: Oviedo
- 2019: Celta (assistant)
- 2021: Elche (assistant)
- 2022–2023: Zaragoza (assistant)
- 2024–2025: Granada (assistant)
- 2026–: Valladolid (assistant)
- * Club domestic league appearances and goals

David Generelo Miranda (born 11 August 1982) is a Spanish former professional footballer who played as a central midfielder. He is currently assistant manager of Segunda División club Real Valladolid.

He amassed La Liga totals of 100 games and six goals, representing in the competition Zaragoza, Gimnàstic and Elche (only one game with the latter club). He added 145 matches and nine goals in the Segunda División, in a 16-year career.

== Playing career ==
Born in Badajoz, Extremadura, Generelo emerged through local CD Badajoz's youth academy, signing with Real Zaragoza in January 2000 and being assigned to the reserves in the Segunda División B. He first appeared with the first team during 2002–03's Segunda División and, from then on, would be regularly used by the Aragonese although never an undisputed starter, helping the club to win the Copa del Rey in his first professional season.

In 2006–07, Generelo served a loan spell at newly promoted Gimnàstic de Tarragona, appearing regularly as the Catalans were immediately relegated from La Liga. The following campaign was curtailed after just four games due to a serious foot injury.

After contributing 23 matches – mainly from the bench – as Zaragoza returned to the top flight after one year out, Generelo's contract with the club expired. On 22 July 2009, he joined Elche CF in a 2+1 deal.

Generelo subsequently represented RCD Mallorca and Real Oviedo, achieving promotion to the second tier with the latter. He retired on 15 December at the age of 33, due to a knee injury.

== Coaching career ==
On 17 March 2016, Generelo was appointed interim manager of his last club Oviedo following Sergio Egea's resignation. Following a stint in Zaragoza's youth academy, he rejoined former Elche boss Fran Escribá's coaching staff at RC Celta de Vigo in March 2019.

The pair continued to work together at Elche (top division), Zaragoza, Granada CF and Real Valladolid (second).

== Managerial statistics ==
As of match played 4 June 2016

Managerial record by team and tenure
Team	Nat	From	To	Record								Ref
Team	Nat	From	To	G	W	D	L	GF	GA	GD	Win %	Ref
Oviedo	(Spain)	17 March 2016	4 June 2016	13	4	1	8	11	17	−6	30.77	
Total				13	4	1	8	11	17	−6	30.77	—

== Honours ==
Zaragoza

- Copa del Rey: 2003–04
- Supercopa de España: 2004

Elche

- Segunda División: 2012–13

Oviedo

- Segunda División B: 2014–15
