= Cani (Spanish footballer) =

Spanish footballer

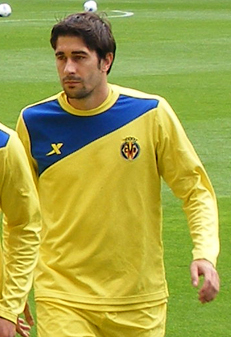
- Cani training with Villarreal in 2011

Personal information
- Full name: Rubén Gracia Calmache
- Date of birth: 3 August 1981 (age 45)
- Place of birth: Zaragoza, Spain
- Height: 1.80 m (5 ft 11 in)
- Position: Right midfielder

Youth career
- Stadium Venecia
- Zaragoza

Senior career*
Years	Team	Apps	(Gls)
2000–2002	Zaragoza B	32	(6)
2000–2001	→ Utebo (loan)	15	(1)
2002–2006	Zaragoza	122	(13)
2006–2015	Villarreal	259	(23)
2015	→ Atlético Madrid (loan)	4	(0)
2015–2016	Deportivo La Coruña	18	(0)
2016–2017	Zaragoza	32	(1)
Total		482	(44)
- * Club domestic league appearances and goals

Rubén Gracia Calmache (born 3 August 1981), known as Cani, is a Spanish former professional footballer. Usually a right midfielder, he also played on the left.

During his career, he played almost exclusively with Zaragoza and Villarreal, winning two major titles with the former club and appearing in 327 competitive matches with the latter.

== Club career ==
=== Zaragoza ===
Cani was born in Zaragoza. A youth graduate of his hometown's Real Zaragoza, he was shining in the B team who were playing in the Segunda División B after a loan stint with lowly Utebo FC of Tercera División and, as the main squad's fate was already decided in the 2001–02 season (relegation, ranking last) he received his first-team debut, playing 30 minutes in a 1–1 home draw against FC Barcelona.

After helping the Aragonese club regain its top-flight status by appearing in 24 games and scoring five goals, his first coming on 23 March 2003 in a 2–0 win at Real Oviedo, Cani went on to become a vital midfield element. In the 2003–04 campaign, he helped Zaragoza win the Copa del Rey in a 3–2 extra time win over Real Madrid – he was also sent off during the match.

=== Villarreal ===
During 2005–06, Cani was one of La Liga's best passers, and at the season's end he signed with Villarreal CF for €11 million. He played 32 matches for the 2007–08 runners-up, but did not score.

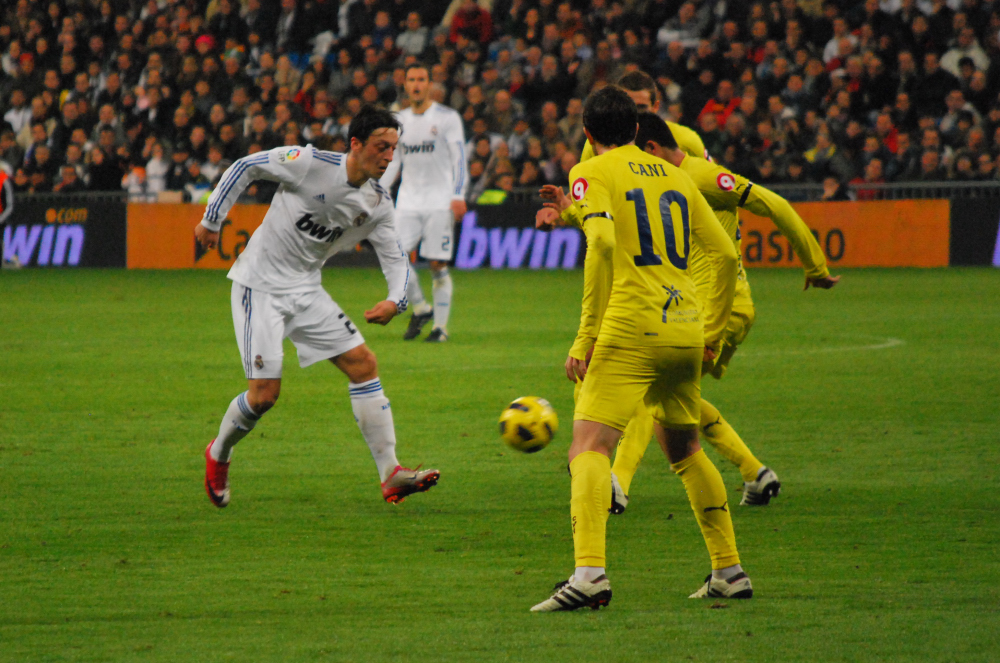
Cani observes in the forefront as his teammate competes Real Madrid midfielder Mesut Özil for the ball in January 2011.

In the 2008–09 campaign, after a shaky start, which included not being called to some matches by coach Manuel Pellegrini in spite of being healthy, Cani finished strongly, scoring five times in the last nine appearances, including the final three: Real Madrid (3–2), Valencia CF (3–1) and RCD Mallorca (3–2), as Villarreal finished fifth; after the Chilean manager's departure to Real Madrid, he again appeared in the starting XI regularly.

Cani continued to be an undisputed starter in 2010–11 – Robert Pires had also left the club. On 9 January 2011, he netted the opener at Real Madrid, with a subtle finish inside the box; already on the bench, he threw a water bottle at opposing manager José Mourinho after the coach celebrated Cristiano Ronaldo's hat-trick (which put the score at 3–2 for the hosts, eventually 4–2) in front of his team's bench, being immediately sent off. The one-match suspension was later lifted, and he found the net in the next game, a 3–3 home draw against Sevilla FC in the quarter-finals of the domestic cup, and in the following, scoring from more than 50 metres in a 4–2 home defeat of CA Osasuna, with the Valencians eventually finishing the league in fourth place; he added three goals in a semi-final run in the UEFA Europa League, including one in each leg of the last-four clash against FC Porto in an eventual 7–4 aggregate loss.

On 7 January 2015, Cani joined Atlético Madrid on loan for the remainder of the season, after successfully passing a medical. He made his first appearance three weeks later, coming on as a substitute for Arda Turan for the last 27 minutes of a 3–2 home loss to Barcelona in the Spanish Cup quarter-finals (4–2 loss on aggregate).

=== Later career ===
On 23 July 2015, Cani terminated his contract with Villarreal and signed a one-year deal with Deportivo de La Coruña the following day. He left at the end of the campaign, contributing 888 minutes to a 15th-place finish.

Cani returned to his first club Zaragoza on 6 July 2016, after agreeing to a two-year deal. Roughly one year later, despite featuring regularly during the second division season, the 36-year-old announced his retirement.

== International career ==
In the run up to the 2006 FIFA World Cup, Spain national team manager Luis Aragonés called up Cani to a senior team get-together, however he was ultimately not part of the squad at the finals and never won a cap.

== Personal life ==
Cani's nickname was passed down from his father and grandfather who were both footballers, as was his brother. His father Jesús held the record for most appearances for Andorra CF.

== Career statistics ==
Appearances and goals by club, season and competition
Club	Season	League			Cup		Europe		Other		Total	
Club	Season	Division	Apps	Goals	Apps	Goals	Apps	Goals	Apps	Goals	Apps	Goals
Zaragoza B	2001–02	Segunda División B	31	6	–		–		–		31	6
Zaragoza B	2002–03	Segunda División B	1	0	–		–		–		1	0
Zaragoza B	Total		32	6	0	0	0	0	0	0	32	6
Zaragoza	2001–02	La Liga	1	0	0	0	–		–		1	0
Zaragoza	2002–03	Segunda División	24	5	1	1	–		–		25	6
Zaragoza	2003–04	La Liga	32	4	6	0	–		–		38	4
Zaragoza	2004–05	La Liga	35	2	0	0	9	0	2 (Note: Appearances in Supercopa de España)	0	46	2
Zaragoza	2005–06	La Liga	30	2	8	1	–		–		38	3
Zaragoza	Total		122	13	15	2	9	0	2	0	148	15
Villarreal	2006–07	La Liga	35	4	3	0	–		2 (Note: Appearances in UEFA Intertoto Cup)	0	40	4
Villarreal	2007–08	La Liga	32	0	4	0	5	1	–		41	1
Villarreal	2008–09	La Liga	22	6	2	0	7	0	–		31	6
Villarreal	2009–10	La Liga	35	2	3	0	9	1	–		47	3
Villarreal	2010–11	La Liga	34	5	6	1	14	4	–		54	10
Villarreal	2011–12	La Liga	29	0	1	0	5	1	–		35	1
Villarreal	2012–13	Segunda División	37	3	1	0	–		–		38	3
Villarreal	2013–14	La Liga	26	3	1	0	–		–		27	3
Villarreal	2014–15	La Liga	9	0	0	0	5	2	–		14	2
Villarreal	Total		259	23	21	1	45	9	2	0	327	33
Atlético Madrid (loan)	2014–15	La Liga	4	0	1	0	1	0	–		6	0
Deportivo La Coruña	2015–16	La Liga	18	0	1	0	–		–		19	0
Zaragoza	2016–17	Segunda División	32	1	0	0	–		–		32	1
Career total			467	43	38	3	55	9	4	0	564	55

== Honours ==
Zaragoza

- Copa del Rey: 2003–04; runner-up: 2005–06
- Supercopa de España: 2004
