= José María Movilla =

Spanish footballer (born 1975)

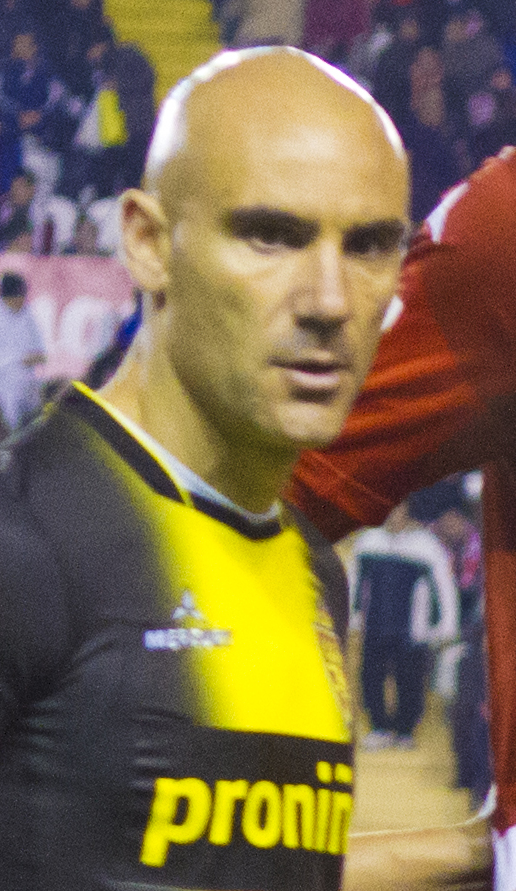
- Movilla with Zaragoza in 2012

Personal information
- Full name: José María Movilla Cubero
- Date of birth: 8 February 1975 (age 51)
- Place of birth: Madrid, Spain
- Height: 1.71 m (5 ft 7 in)
- Position: Midfielder

Youth career
- Leganés
- Real Madrid

Senior career*
Years	Team	Apps	(Gls)
1994–1997	Moscardó	63	(3)
1995–1996	→ Numancia (loan)	30	(2)
1997	Ourense	3	(0)
1998–2001	Málaga	133	(8)
2001–2004	Atlético Madrid	73	(2)
2004	→ Zaragoza (loan)	15	(0)
2004–2007	Zaragoza	84	(1)
2007–2009	Murcia	50	(1)
2009–2012	Rayo Vallecano	119	(5)
2012–2014	Zaragoza	42	(0)
Total		612	(22)
- * Club domestic league appearances and goals

José María Movilla Cubero (born 8 February 1975) is a Spanish former professional footballer who played mainly as a central midfielder.

He played 299 La Liga matches in ten seasons, representing mainly Zaragoza and retiring at 39.

== Club career ==
An unsuccessful graduate from Real Madrid's system, Madrid-born Movilla started his professional career with modest clubs Moscardó, Numancia and Ourense. He signed with Málaga in January 1998, being instrumental in the Andalusia side's promotion from Segunda División B to La Liga in just two years.

Returning to Segunda División, Movilla joined Atlético Madrid, where he managed another promotion in the 2001–02 season while playing all 38 games. He arrived on loan to Real Zaragoza in January 2004, helping them to avoid top-flight relegation and win the Copa del Rey.

The move was made permanent subsequently, and Movilla spent three additional campaigns with the Aragonese, after which he joined newly promoted Real Murcia. At the start of 2008–09, with the side now in the second division, he was, alongside Paco Gallardo, ousted from the squad by coach Javier Clemente, only being reinstated after the latter's dismissal in December 2008.

On 4 July 2009, Movilla moved close to home as he agreed to a two-year contract at Rayo Vallecano. In 2010–11, he contributed 41 matches and 3,269 minutes in a return to the top flight after eight years.

Movilla, who celebrated his 37th birthday in February, took part in 38 fixtures in 2011–12, being essential as Rayo retained their league status. He scored the first of his two goals in the season in the opener against Athletic Bilbao, a 1–1 away draw.

Movilla returned to Zaragoza for 2012–13, on a one-year deal. On 4 January 2013, after a 1–2 home loss to Real Betis, he became their oldest player to make a competitive appearance at the age of 37 years and 332 days, surpassing Enrique Yarza as the campaign went on to end in relegation.

On 28 January 2014, after making negative remarks about the club's management in social media, Movilla was suspended for 30 days. He was released the following month along with Javier Paredes, finding about the news through Zaragoza's website.

== Honours ==
Zaragoza

- Copa del Rey: 2003–04
- Supercopa de España: 2004

Málaga

- Segunda División: 1998–99

Atlético Madrid

- Segunda División: 2001–02
