= Gabriel Milito =

Argentine footballer

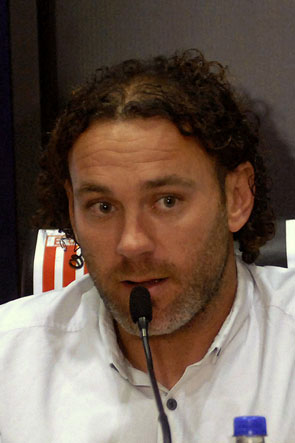
- Milito as Estudiantes manager in 2015

Personal information
- Full name: Gabriel Alejandro Milito
- Date of birth: 7 September 1980 (age 46)
- Place of birth: Bernal, Argentina
- Height: 1.77 m (5 ft 10 in)
- Position: Centre-back

Team information
- Current team: Guadalajara (head coach)

Youth career
- Independiente

Senior career*
Years	Team	Apps	(Gls)
1997–2003	Independiente	123	(3)
2003–2007	Zaragoza	137	(5)
2007–2011	Barcelona	84	(1)
2011–2012	Independiente	31	(0)
Total		339	(9)

International career
1997	Argentina U17	4	(0)
1999	Argentina U20	2	(0)
2000–2011	Argentina	42	(1)

Managerial career
- 2015: Estudiantes
- 2016: Independiente
- 2017–2018: O'Higgins
- 2019–2020: Estudiantes
- 2021–2023: Argentinos Juniors
- 2024: Atlético Mineiro
- 2025–: Guadalajara
Medal record
Men's football
Representing Argentina
Copa América
Runner-up	2007 Venezuela
FIFA Confederations Cup
Runner-up	2005 Germany
- * Club domestic league appearances and goals

Gabriel Alejandro Milito (born 7 September 1980) is an Argentine professional football coach and former player who played as a centre-back. He is currently head coach of Liga MX club Guadalajara.

Milito began and concluded his professional career at Independiente. He spent seven years in Spain, playing for Zaragoza and Barcelona, accumulating La Liga totals of 187 matches and six goals. He retired in June 2012, beginning his coaching career the following year.

On the international stage, Milito represented Argentina at the FIFA World Cup in 2006 and at the Copa América in 2007 and 2011.

== Club career ==
=== Early years ===
Born in Bernal, Buenos Aires Province, Milito started playing professionally with Primera División side Independiente in 1997. During that time he often faced his older brother Diego, who played for Independiente's arch-rivals Racing Club de Avellaneda.

=== Zaragoza ===
In July 2003, Milito was due to be transferred to Real Madrid, but the Spaniards rejected the player after medical results showed, according to them, a not-fully-recovered knee injury; Jorge Valdano, who acted as director of football, further added that the player had always been appreciated for his technical skills, but his physical state was a cause for great concern. He decided to stay in the country, and joined Real Zaragoza.

In his four seasons with the Aragonese, Milito was an automatic first choice and won the Copa del Rey in his first season against former suitors Real Madrid; he never played fewer than 33 La Liga matches, and rejoined sibling Diego in 2005. In July that year, he was pursued by European champions Liverpool and their Spanish manager Rafael Benítez, whose £7.5 million approach was rejected; he then signed a new contract until 2010, with a buyout clause of €30 million.

Italian newspaper Tuttosport published an interview in June 2007 in which Milito – who holds the country's passport through descent – said that he wanted to leave for Juventus. The player denied the meeting had taken place.

=== Barcelona ===
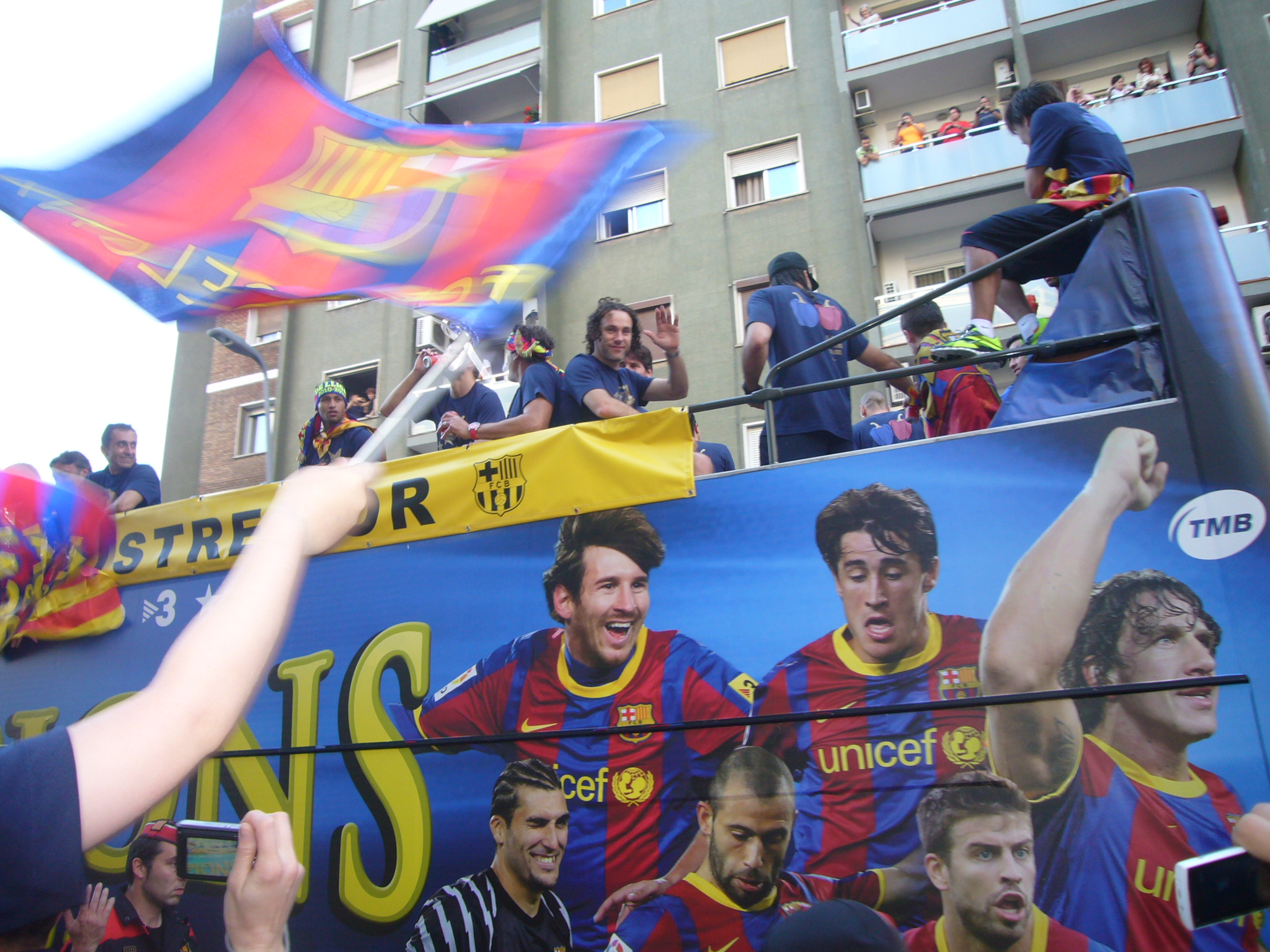
Milito (center) waves to fans during Barcelona's 2010–11 victory parade

On 10 July 2007, an agreement was reached with Barcelona for €18.5million (£13.9 million) and, the following week, Milito passed his medical and signed a four-year deal with the club worth €4 million (£2.7 million) a year; he was given the number 3 shirt, which was formerly worn by Thiago Motta.

Milito made his competitive debut for Barcelona on 2 September 2007, in a 3–1 home win against Athletic Bilbao. He scored his first goal for the Catalans on 24 November, in a 3–0 victory over Recreativo de Huelva also at the Camp Nou.

On 5 May 2008, it was announced that Milito had damage to the anterior cruciate ligament in his right knee. This rendered him ineligible for the entire 2008–09 campaign, which ended in a treble.

After being sidelined for almost two years (602 days), Milito finally returned to action when he played in a friendly with Kazma in Kuwait. On 5 January 2010, he made his return to competitive football in the first leg of the Copa del Rey's round of 16, a 1–2 home loss against Sevilla. He reappeared in the domestic league five days later, coming on as a substitute for Carles Puyol for the final seven minutes of the 5–0 away win over Tenerife.

Milito contributed one goal to a 5–1 home win against Ceuta in the domestic cup on 11 November 2010 (7–1 on aggregate), but had to leave the game injured. On 30 April 2011, starting in a league match at Real Sociedad, he had a goal wrongfully ruled out for offside with the score at 1–1, as the hosts went on to win it 2–1; as a result of his action he also tore a calf muscle, being sidelined for the rest of the season and making ten appearances for the eventual champions.

=== Return to Independiente ===
In early August 2011, the 30-year-old Milito was released from the last year of his contract with Barcelona, and signed shortly after with former club Independiente. On 12 June 2012, he announced his retirement due to being mentally and physically exhausted.

== International career ==
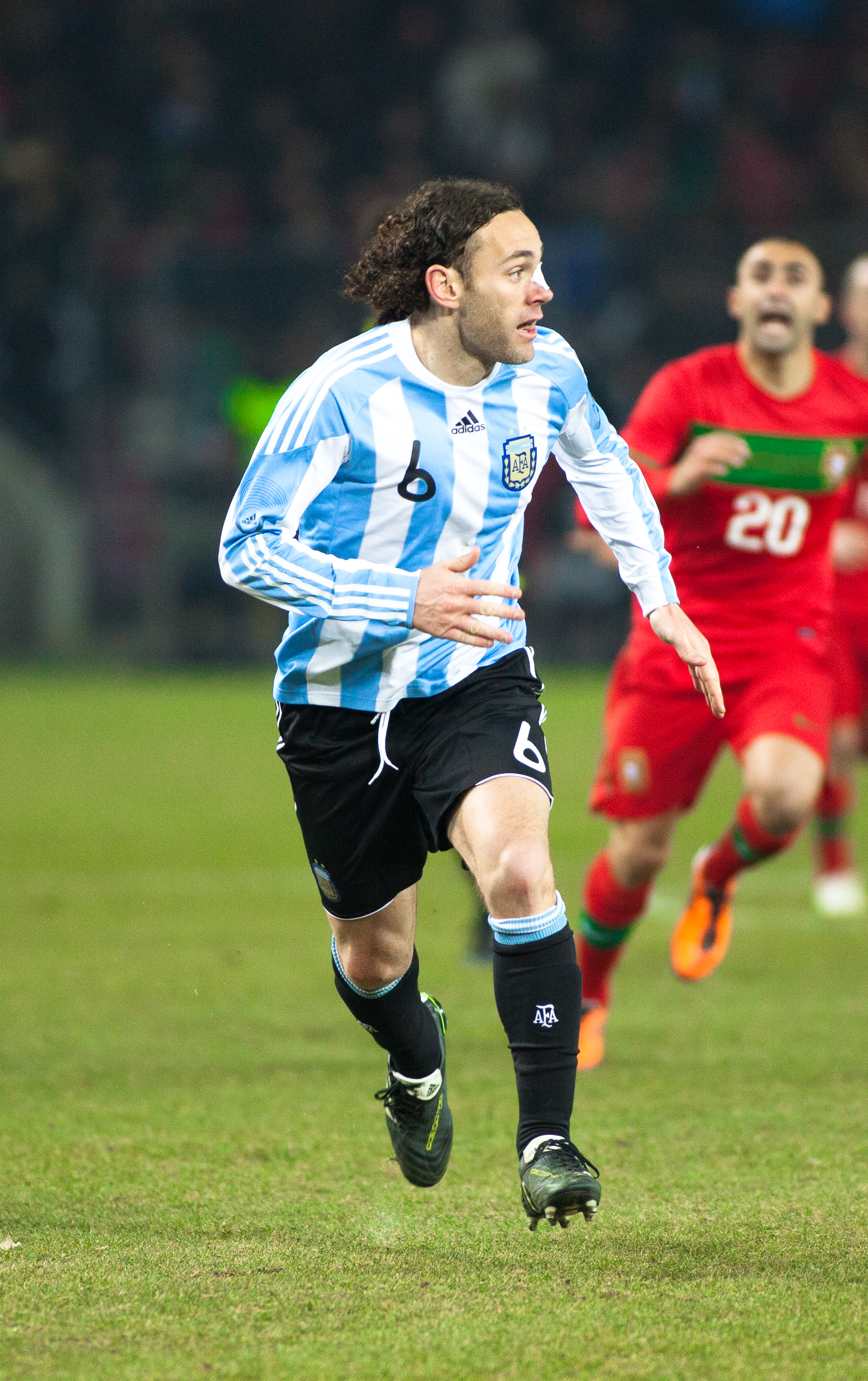
Milito playing for Argentina in 2010

Milito participated in the 2005 FIFA Confederations Cup with Argentina, helping the nation to the final. He was also part of the squad which took part in the 2006 FIFA World Cup, performing well in his only appearance, the group stage match against the Netherlands which ended in a 0–0 draw.

Milito was selected to the 2007 Copa América squad. He contributed five appearances, as the Albiceleste finished in second position in Venezuela.

On 20 August 2010, national team coach Sergio Batista recalled Milito for a friendly with Spain the following month, the player's first international appearance in more than three years. He started in the 4–1 win in Buenos Aires, and he was subsequently selected for the 2011 Copa América, appearing in all the games for the eventual quarter-finalists.

== Coaching career ==
Milito's first coaching experience was with the reserves team of Independiente. He resigned late into 2014, due to differences with the club's president Hugo Moyano.

On 15 April 2015, Milito replaced Mauricio Pellegrino at the helm of Estudiantes, after being convinced by president Juan Sebastián Verón. Despite good results, he resigned at the end of the year.

On 12 May 2016, Milito was re-appointed as Independiente manager, again in the place of Pellegrino. He signed an 18-month contract.

Milito started his first coaching adventure outside Argentina on 9 August 2017, signing for two years with O'Higgins from the Chilean Primera División. He returned to Estudiantes on a three-year deal on 11 March 2019 but, one year later, after being ousted in the round of 64 of the Copa Argentina by lowly Deportivo Laferrere, he again resigned.

In January 2021, Milito signed a three-year contract at Argentinos Juniors, replacing Diego Dabove who had moved to San Lorenzo. At the end of the 2022 season, having qualified for the Copa Libertadores, he extended his contract to 2027 but with a clause to cancel it. He unexpectedly used the option on 30 August 2023, after a 1–0 home loss to San Martín in the last 16 of the domestic cup.

On 24 March 2024, Milito was announced as head coach of Brazilian club Atlético Mineiro, agreeing to a deal running until December 2025. He took charge ahead of the 2024 Campeonato Mineiro finals and led the team to the title with an aggregate 5–3 win over archrivals Cruzeiro.

Milito also led Galo to the finals of both the 2024 Copa do Brasil and the 2024 Copa Libertadores, but lost both titles. On 4 December 2024, after a 12-winless match run, he was sacked.

On 26 May 2025, Mexican club Guadalajara announced Milito as their new head coach.

== Personal life ==
Milito's older brother Diego was also a footballer. A striker, Diego played with individual and team success for Inter Milan, and they both represented Real Zaragoza and the national team.

== Career statistics ==
=== Club ===
Appearances and goals by club, season and competition
Club	Season	League			Cup		Continental		Total	
Club	Season	Division	Apps	Goals	Apps	Goals	Apps	Goals	Apps	Goals
Independiente	1997–98	Argentine Primera División	2	0	–				2	0
Independiente	1998–99	Argentine Primera División	25	0	–		2	0	27	0
Independiente	1999–2000	Argentine Primera División	34	2	–		8	0	42	2
Independiente	2000–01	Argentine Primera División	25	1	–		5	0	30	1
Independiente	2001–02	Argentine Primera División	3	0	–				3	0
Independiente	2002–03	Argentine Primera División	34	0	–				34	0
Independiente	Total		123	3	–		15	0	138	3
Zaragoza	2003–04	La Liga	35	0	0	0	0	0	35	0
Zaragoza	2004–05	La Liga	33	3	0	0	10	0	43	3
Zaragoza	2005–06	La Liga	34	1	0	0	0	0	34	1
Zaragoza	2006–07	La Liga	35	1	4	0	0	0	39	1
Zaragoza	Total		137	5	4	0	10	0	151	5
Barcelona	2007–08	La Liga	27	1	6	0	9	0	42	1
Barcelona	2008–09	La Liga	0	0	0	0	0	0	0	0
Barcelona	2009–10	La Liga	11	0	1	0	5	0	17	0
Barcelona	2010–11	La Liga	10	0	4	1	2	0	16	1
Barcelona	Total		48	1	11	1	16	0	75	2
Independiente	2011–12	Argentine Primera División	19	0	1	0	2	0	22	0
Career total			308	9	15	1	43	0	364	10

=== International ===
Appearances and goals by national team and year
National team	Year	Apps	Goals
Argentina	2000	1	0
Argentina	2001	0	0
Argentina	2002	0	0
Argentina	2003	4	0
Argentina	2004	3	0
Argentina	2005	6	0
Argentina	2006	5	0
Argentina	2007	14	1
Argentina	2008	0	0
Argentina	2009	0	0
Argentina	2010	2	0
Argentina	2011	7	0
Total		42	1

Score and result list Argentina's goal tally first, score column indicates score after Milito goal.

International goal scored by Gabriel Milito
No.	Date	Venue	Opponent	Score	Result	Competition
1	16 October 2007	José Pachencho Romero, Maracaibo, Venezuela	Venezuela	1–0	2–0	2010 FIFA World Cup qualification

== Managerial statistics ==
As of match played 31 October 2026

Team	Nat	From	To	Record							
Team	Nat	From	To	G	W	D	L	GF	GA	GD	Win %
Estudiantes	(Argentina)	15 April 2015	5 December 2015	31	16	9	6	42	23	+19	51.61
Independiente	(Argentina)	12 May 2016	31 December 2016	19	8	6	5	14	11	+3	42.11
O'Higgins	(Chile)	14 August 2017	30 June 2018	26	10	5	11	35	37	−2	38.46
Estudiantes	(Argentina)	11 March 2019	4 March 2020	34	12	12	10	36	28	+8	35.29
Argentinos Juniors	(Argentina)	19 January 2021	30 August 2023	135	57	35	43	162	127	+35	42.22
Atlético Mineiro	(Brazil)	24 March 2024	4 December 2024	62	23	20	19	85	77	+8	37.10
Guadalajara	(Mexico)	26 May 2025	present	61	31	14	16	102	70	+32	50.82
Total				368	157	101	110	476	373	+103	42.66

== Honours ==
=== Player ===
Independiente

- Argentine Primera División: Apertura 2002

Zaragoza

- Copa del Rey: 2003–04
- Supercopa de España: 2004

Barcelona

- La Liga: 2008–09, 2009–10, 2010–11
- Copa del Rey: 2008–09, runner-up: 2010–11
- Supercopa de España: 2009, 2010
- UEFA Super Cup: 2009
- UEFA Champions League: 2008–09, 2010–11
- FIFA Club World Cup: 2009

Argentina U20

- South American U-20 Championship: 1999

Argentina

- Copa América runner-up: 2007
- FIFA Confederations Cup runner-up: 2005

Individual

- Argentine Footballer of the Year: 2002
- South American Team of the Year: 2002

=== Manager ===
Atlético Mineiro

- Campeonato Mineiro: 2024

Individual

- Liga MX Manager of the Month: October 2025, January 2026, March 2026
