= Álvaro (footballer, born 1977) =

Brazilian footballer

Personal information
- Full name: Álvaro Luiz Maior de Aquino
- Date of birth: 1 November 1977 (age 49)
- Place of birth: Nilópolis, Brazil
- Height: 1.83 m (6 ft 0 in)
- Position: Defender

Senior career*
Years	Team	Apps	(Gls)
1997–1998	São Paulo	13	(0)
1998	América-MG	16	(0)
1999	Goiás		
2000	São Paulo	1	(0)
2000	Atlético Mineiro	28	(2)
2000–2003	Las Palmas	70	(6)
2003–2006	Zaragoza	102	(6)
2006–2008	Levante	51	(5)
2008–2009	Internacional	5	(0)
2009–2010	Flamengo	15	(0)
2011	Vila Nova	2	(1)
2013	Linense		
2013	Bragantino	25	(3)
2014	Mogi Mirim		
2014	Vila Nova	5	(0)
2015	Linense	14	(1)
2016	Democrata		
2016-2017	Guaraní-MG		
2017	Taboão da Serra		
2017-2018	Tricordiano		

International career
2000	Brazil U23	6	(0)
- * Club domestic league appearances and goals as of 6 September 2015

Álvaro Luiz Maior de Aquino (born 1 November 1977), known simply as Álvaro, is a Brazilian former footballer who played as a defender.

Mainly a central defender, he holds a Spanish passport due to the years he spent in the country, representing three clubs and amassing La Liga totals of 192 games and 15 goals over the course of seven seasons.

== Club career ==
Born in Nilópolis, São Paulo, Álvaro played for several Brazilian teams in quick succession to start his career, including two spells with São Paulo FC. In 2000 he was signed by UD Las Palmas in Spain, going on to spend three seasons with the club, two of those in La Liga. While in the Canary Islands he was found guilty of forging a European Union passport, spending several months during the 2001–02 campaign on the sidelines.

In the 2003 off-season, Álvaro signed for Real Zaragoza where he spent another three years, rarely missing a game and winning the 2004 Copa del Rey, against Real Madrid (3–2 in Barcelona). He scored his first league goal for the Aragonese on 2 November 2003, helping to a 2–0 away win over RCD Espanyol.

In the middle of 2006, Álvaro joined Levante UD, which had just regained top flight status. He was expected to sign for Premier League team Newcastle United for a fee around £3 million before the January 2008 transfer window closed, but finally remained in Spain until the end of the season as the offer from the latter proved to be a hoax.

In June 2008, in the middle of a severe financial crisis at Levante and with the club also being relegated from the top level, Álvaro returned to Brazil and joined Sport Club Internacional. The following year, he signed a one-year deal with Clube de Regatas do Flamengo.

== Club statistics ==
As of 2 June 2010

Club	Season	Brazilian League		Brazilian Cup		Libertadores Cup		South American Cup		State League		Total	
Club	Season	Apps	Goals	Apps	Goals	Apps	Goals	Apps	Goals	Apps	Goals	Apps	Goals
Internacional	2008	3	0	-	-	-	-	4	0	-	-	7	0
Internacional	2009	5	0	11	0	-	-	-	-	-	-	16	0
Total		8	0	11	0	-	-	4	0	-	-	23	0
Flamengo	2009	13	0	-	-	-	-	-	-	-	-	13	0
Flamengo	2010	2	0	-	-	5	0	-	-	11	0	18	0
Total		15	0	-	-	5	0	-	-	11	0	31	0
Career total		23	0	11	0	5	0	4	0	11	0	54	0

according to Flamengo's official website and Flaestatística

== Honours ==
Zaragoza

- Copa del Rey: 2003–04
- Supercopa de España: 2004

Internacional

- Copa Sudamericana: 2008
- Campeonato Gaúcho: 2009

Flamengo

- Campeonato Brasileiro Série A: 2009
