= Luciano Galletti =

Argentine footballer

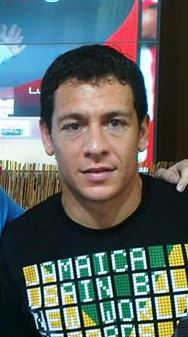
- Galletti in 2009

Personal information
- Full name: Luciano Martin Galletti
- Date of birth: 9 April 1980 (age 46)
- Place of birth: La Plata, Argentina
- Height: 1.75 m (5 ft 9 in)
- Position: Right winger

Youth career
- 1991–1993: Tolosano
- 1993–1997: Estudiantes

Senior career*
Years	Team	Apps	(Gls)
1997–1999	Estudiantes	37	(2)
1999	Parma	0	(0)
1999–2000	Napoli	20	(2)
2000–2001	Estudiantes	28	(9)
2001–2005	Zaragoza	134	(14)
2005–2007	Atlético Madrid	62	(5)
2007–2010	Olympiacos	59	(19)
2013	OFI	6	(0)
Total		346	(51)

International career
1999	Argentina U20	12	(10)
2000–2005	Argentina	13	(3)
- * Club domestic league appearances and goals

Luciano Martín Galletti (Spanish pronunciation: [luˈsjano ɣaˈleti]; born 9 April 1980) is an Argentine retired professional footballer who played as a right winger.

In a professional career that lasted 14 years he played mostly in Spain, with Zaragoza and Atlético Madrid, but also represented Olympiacos, winning five major titles with the latter club. He was also retired from 2010 to 2013, before returning to active with OFI.

An Argentina international in the 2000s, Galletti appeared with the national team at the 2005 Confederations Cup.

== Club career ==
=== Early years and Italy ===
Born in La Plata, Buenos Aires Province, Galletti's career began with Estudiantes de La Plata, where his father Rubén Horacio played as a right-wing forward during the 1970s. He scored once in 24 games in his second season in the Primera División.

In January 1999, Galletti joined Parma A.C. in Italy, but failed to break into the first team, moving in the following transfer window to another club in the country, Serie B's S.S.C. Napoli – loaned by Estudiantes, to where he would return for the 2000–01 campaign.

=== Zaragoza ===
Galletti signed with Real Zaragoza from Spain in the 2001 off-season. He made his La Liga debut on 26 August in a 1–2 away loss against RCD Espanyol, and finished his first year with 27 matches and two goals as the season ended in relegation.

From there onwards, Galletti became an undisputed starter for the Aragonese, never appearing in less than 34 contests for the remainder of his spell. In 2003–04 he helped them win the Copa del Rey, scoring the winner in a 3–2 extra time win over Real Madrid.

=== Atlético Madrid ===
On 29 July 2005, Galletti joined fellow league side Atlético Madrid for €4 million. He netted his first league goal for his new team on 27 October, closing the scoresheet at home against Cádiz CF (3–0).

In his second season with the Colchoneros, Galletti scored four goals in 36 games as they finished in seventh position.

=== Olympiacos ===
On 30 June 2007, Galletti was transferred to Olympiacos F.C. in Greece, for a reported fee of €2.5 million, with the player signing a four-year contract with an annual salary of €1.3 million. On 2 May 2009, he scored Olympiacos‘ 4th goal of the final of the Greek Cup against AEK Athens F.C. giving his team a 4–3 lead but got sent off right after that and watched his team getting equalized but eventually winning the game and the title after a thrilling penalty shoot-out; after that campaign ended and he contributed with a career-best 14 goals to the national championship's conquest, he signed a contract extension linking him to the Piraeus club until 2013 – the new deal contained a release clause fee of €15 million.

In early February 2010, Galletti was diagnosed with severe kidney failure, causing him to miss the rest of the season. He announced his retirement the following summer, aged only 30; in early October 2012, however, he underwent a successful kidney transplant, the donor being his father Rubén.

Galletti returned to Olympiacos on 3 September 2014 after an unassuming spell as player at OFI, being appointed scout for Latin America.

== International career ==
Galletti was the top scorer at the 1999 South American Youth Championship with nine goals in only eight games, ranking ahead the likes of Ronaldinho and Roque Santa Cruz as the Argentina under-20s won the competition in Paraguay. He earned 13 caps for the full side, making his debut in 2000 and being selected to the squad that appeared in the 2005 FIFA Confederations Cup, where he played three matches for the eventual runners-up, including the final against Brazil.

== Honours ==
Zaragoza

- Copa del Rey: 2003–04
- Supercopa de España: 2004

Olympiacos

- Super League Greece: 2007–08, 2008–09
- Greek Cup: 2007–08, 2008–09
- Greek Super Cup: 2007

Argentina

- South American Youth Championship: 1999
- FIFA Confederations Cup runner-up: 2005

Individual

- South American Youth Championship top scorer: 1999
- Super League Greece Player of the Season: 2008–09
- Super League Greece top scorer: 2008–09
- Super League Greece Best Foreign Player: 2008–09
- Greek Cup top assist provider: 2008–09
