= Víctor Muñoz (footballer, born 1957) =

Spanish footballer

Víctor
Personal information
- Full name: Víctor Muñoz Manrique
- Date of birth: 15 March 1957 (age 69)
- Place of birth: Zaragoza, Spain
- Height: 1.72 m (5 ft 8 in)
- Position: Midfielder

Youth career
- Zaragoza

Senior career*
Years	Team	Apps	(Gls)
1976–1981	Zaragoza	127	(12)
1981–1988	Barcelona	224	(14)
1988–1990	Sampdoria	48	(2)
1990–1991	St Mirren	18	(1)
1991	Zaragoza	4	(0)
Total		421	(29)

International career
1979–1980	Spain U23	7	(2)
1979–1983	Spain amateur	11	(1)
1980–1981	Spain B	3	(0)
1981–1988	Spain	60	(3)

Managerial career
- 1996–1997: Mallorca
- 1997: Logroñés
- 1999–2000: Lleida
- 2000–2002: Villarreal
- 2004–2006: Zaragoza
- 2006–2007: Panathinaikos
- 2007–2008: Recreativo
- 2008–2009: Getafe
- 2010–2011: Terek Grozny
- 2011–2012: Neuchâtel Xamax
- 2012–2013: Sion
- 2014: Zaragoza
Medal record
Representing Spain
UEFA European Championship
Runner-up	1984 France
- * Club domestic league appearances and goals

Víctor Muñoz Manrique, (born 15 March 1957), known simply as Víctor as a player, is a Spanish former professional football midfielder and manager.

He spent most of his 15-year career with Barcelona, winning six titles and achieving La Liga totals of 332 games and 25 goals. In the competition, he also represented Zaragoza.

A Spain international during the 1980s, Víctor represented the country at the 1986 World Cup and two European Championships. He later became a manager, leading four top-division teams and winning the Copa del Rey for Zaragoza in 2004.

== Club career ==
Víctor was born in Zaragoza, Aragon. After starting out at hometown club Real Zaragoza and being relegated in his first professional season, he was purchased by La Liga powerhouse FC Barcelona, being a very important element for the Catalans in a seven-year spell; on 4 June 1983, he scored his team's first goal in a 2–1 win against Real Madrid in the final of the Copa del Rey.

Víctor was also one of the first Spaniards to ever play in Serie A, with two seasons with UC Sampdoria. Following a quick stint at St Mirren where he teamed up with his former Barça teammate Steve Archibald, he returned to Zaragoza to see out his career aged 34.

== International career ==
Víctor was a regular for Spain for most of the 1980s, making his debut on 25 March 1981 in a 2–1 friendly win over England and going on to earn a further 59 caps with three goals. He played for the nation at the 1986 FIFA World Cup as well as the UEFA Euro 1984 (in a final runner-up position to hosts France) and 1988 tournaments, retiring from international duty immediately after that group-stage exit.

== Style of play ==
An all-around midfield unit, Víctor was best known for his great physical strength that helped him tire his opponents in the early stages of the match.

== Coaching career ==
Muñoz started working as a manager in the mid-1990s, being successively at the helm of RCD Mallorca, CD Logroñés, UE Lleida, Villarreal CF and Zaragoza. With the last of those teams, he won the 2003–04 domestic cup with a 3–2 extra time victory over Real Madrid's Galácticos.

On 8 October 2006, Muñoz signed a two-year contract with Greece's Panathinaikos FC, becoming their 18th coach in ten years. However, he returned to Spain in June 2007 to take over at Recreativo de Huelva, from where he was sacked the following February.

For the 2008–09 campaign, Muñoz was appointed at Getafe CF. Following a string of seven losses in nine games that left the team from the outskirts of Madrid one point above the relegation zone, he was dismissed in April 2009, making way for former Real Madrid player Míchel.

In late December 2010, after more than one year out of football, Muñoz was named head coach of Russian Premier League side FC Terek Grozny. He left his post in Chechnya after less than one month due to failed contract negotiations, being replaced by Ruud Gullit.

Muñoz returned to active in early September 2011, when he became Neuchâtel Xamax FCS's third manager of the season, replacing his compatriot Joaquín Caparrós. He continued his career in the Swiss Super League, with a brief stint at FC Sion from December 2012 until the following February.

On 19 March 2014, Muñoz returned to Zaragoza, succeeding Paco Herrera at a club at risk of relegation to Segunda División B. He was dismissed on 24 November with the side in 8th, one point off the play-offs.

== Career statistics ==
Scores and results list Spain's goal tally first, score column indicates score after each Muñoz goal.

List of international goals scored by Víctor Muñoz
No.	Date	Venue	Opponent	Score	Result	Competition
1	24 February 1982	Luis Casanova, Valencia, Spain	Scotland	1–0	3–0	Friendly
2	17 November 1982	Lansdowne Road, Dublin, Republic of Ireland	Republic of Ireland	3–1	3–3	Euro 1984 qualifying
3	24 September 1986	El Molinón, Gijón, Spain	Greece	3–0	3–1	Friendly

== Managerial statistics ==
As of 22 November 2014

Managerial record by team and tenure
Team	From	To	Record								Ref
Team	From	To	G	W	D	L	GF	GA	GD	Win %	Ref
Mallorca	28 January 1996	21 April 1997	54	32	14	8	90	48	+42	59.26	
Logroñés	24 June 1997	18 December 1997	21	2	8	11	14	26	−12	9.52	
Lleida	9 March 1999	15 June 2000	63	24	16	23	99	88	+11	38.10	
Villarreal	15 June 2000	11 September 2002	94	33	25	36	128	129	−1	35.11	
Zaragoza	20 January 2004	15 May 2006	121	44	37	40	168	170	−2	36.36	
Panathinaikos	10 October 2006	16 May 2007	38	17	10	11	48	34	+14	44.74	
Recreativo	4 July 2007	4 February 2008	26	7	8	11	21	33	−12	26.92	
Getafe	17 June 2008	27 April 2009	35	8	11	16	43	53	−10	22.86	
Terek Grozny	22 December 2010	15 January 2011	0	0	0	0	0	0	+0	—	
Neuchâtel Xamax	2 September 2011	26 January 2012	13	7	2	4	21	15	+6	53.85	
Sion	12 December 2012	25 February 2013	4	2	0	2	5	7	−2	50.00	
Zaragoza	19 March 2014	24 November 2014	27	8	10	9	33	37	−4	29.63	
Career total			496	184	141	171	670	640	+30	37.10	—

== Honours ==
=== Player ===
Zaragoza

- Segunda División: 1977–78

Barcelona

- La Liga: 1984–85
- Copa del Rey: 1982–83, 1987–88
- Supercopa de España: 1983
- Copa de la Liga: 1983
- UEFA Cup Winners' Cup: 1981–82

Sampdoria

- Coppa Italia: 1988–89
- UEFA Cup Winners' Cup: 1989–90; runner-up: 1988–89

Spain

- UEFA European Championship runner-up: 1984

=== Manager ===
Zaragoza

- Copa del Rey: 2003–04
- Supercopa de España: 2004
