= Gerard Escoda (footballer) =

Spanish footballer (1972–2023)

Personal information
- Full name: Gerard Escoda Nogués
- Date of birth: 26 May 1972
- Place of birth: Reus, Spain
- Date of death: 27 January 2023 (aged 50)
- Height: 1.77 m (5 ft 10 in)

Senior career*
Years	Team	Apps	(Gls)
1990–1991	Reus		
1992–1993	Real Zaragoza B	5	(1)
1994–1996	Gimnàstic de Tarragona	74	(24)
1996–2000	Lleida	157	(21)
2000–2002	Villarreal	30	(2)
2002–2004	Salamanca	63	(5)
2004–2006	Lleida	13	(2)
Total		342	(55)
- * Club domestic league appearances and goals

Gerard Escoda Nogués (26 May 1972 – 27 January 2023) was a Spanish professional footballer who played as a forward.

== Career ==
Born in Reus, Escoda played for Reus, Real Zaragoza B, Gimnàstic de Tarragona, Lleida, Villarreal and Salamanca.

Escoda later served as the sporting director of Sabadell. He died on 27 January 2023, at the age of 50.
