= Sávio (footballer, born 1974) =

Brazilian footballer (born 1974)

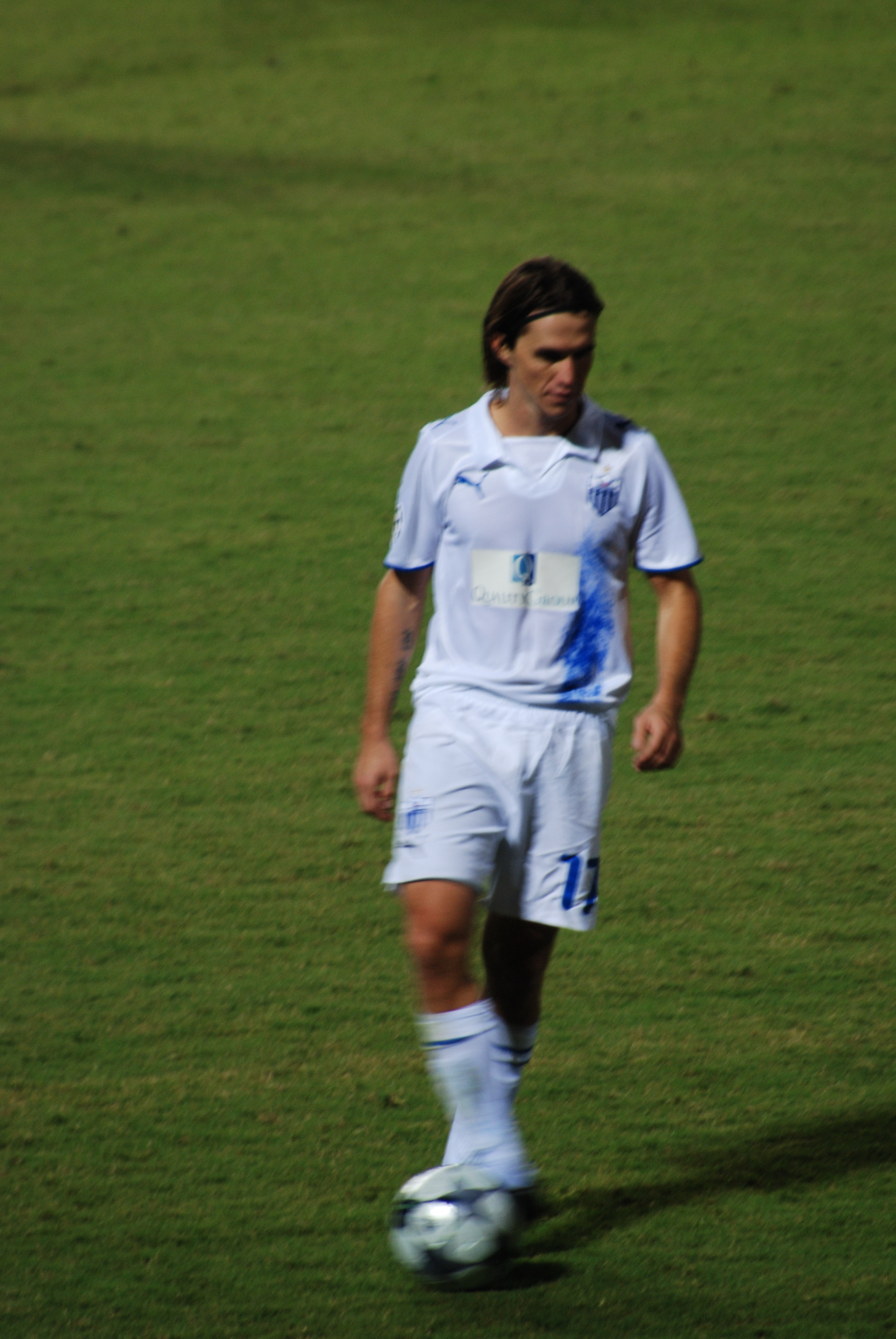

Personal information
- Full name: Sávio Bortolini Pimentel
- Date of birth: 9 January 1974 (age 52)
- Place of birth: Vila Velha, Brazil
- Height: 1.76 m (5 ft 9 in)
- Position: Winger

Youth career
- 1986–1988: Desportiva Ferroviária
- 1988–1993: Flamengo

Senior career*
Years	Team	Apps	(Gls)
1993–1997	Flamengo	74	(20)
1998–2003	Real Madrid	105	(16)
2002–2003	→ Bordeaux (loan)	27	(7)
2003–2006	Zaragoza	95	(16)
2006	Flamengo	10	(0)
2007	Real Sociedad	19	(5)
2007	Levante	12	(0)
2008	Desportiva Capixaba	9	(6)
2008–2009	Anorthosis	16	(4)
2010	Avaí	8	(0)
Total		375	(74)

International career
1994–2000	Brazil	21	(4)
Medal record
Representing Brazil
Men's Football
Bronze medal – third place	1996 Atlanta	Team competition
- * Club domestic league appearances and goals

Sávio Bortolini Pimentel (born 9 January 1974), known simply as Sávio (Portuguese pronunciation: [ˈsavi̯u]), is a Brazilian former professional footballer who played as a left winger.

Known as "Anjo Loiro" ("Blonde Angel") and "Diabo Loiro" ("Blonde Devil"), he played most of his professional career in Spain, being a part of Real Madrid's setup during four-and-a-half seasons and appearing in more than 300 official games with four teams.

A Brazilian international in the mid and late 1990s, Sávio represented the nation in the 1996 Summer Olympics.

== Club career ==
=== Flamengo and Real Madrid ===
Born in Vila Velha, Espírito Santo, Sávio started his footballing career at the Desportiva Capixaba youth team. Still as a junior he was transferred to Rio de Janeiro's Clube de Regatas do Flamengo, where he made his professional debut –– he was hailed as the new Zico by the fans and the press due to his footballing ability, but also due to his frail physique.

In 1995, as part of Flamengo's centennial celebrations, Sávio teamed up with the volatile Romário and Edmundo. After clashing with the former he was transferred to Real Madrid in 1998, helping the La Liga powerhouse to three UEFA Champions League titles and the 2001 national championship; in the 2002–03 season he served a loan stint in France, at FC Girondins de Bordeaux. He holds French nationality.

=== Zaragoza and Flamengo ===
In the following season, Sávio returned to Spain and was one of the most important players in Real Zaragoza, for which he played three years. In his first the Aragonese won the Copa del Rey, precisely against Real Madrid; in the second, he scored a career-best ten league goals.

In May 2006, Sávio returned to Brazil and Flamengo on a free transfer, signing a contract until December 2007. However, on 5 January of the following year, it was announced that he would be transferred to Real Sociedad also in Spain, for which he played his first league game on the 21st against Valencia CF; in late June, after the Basques' relegation, he joined fellow league team Levante UD, and played there until January of the following year, leaving as many teammates due to unpaid wages.

=== Later years ===
After a spell back in Brazil with his very first club, Desportiva Capixaba, Sávio signed in August 2008 with Cypriot side Anorthosis Famagusta FC, appearing with them in the 2008–09 Champions League. In January 2010 the 36-year-old returned to his country, joining Avaí Futebol Clube.

After a few months with the Santa Catarina club, Sávio retired at the end of 2010.

== International career ==
Never a part of any FIFA World Cup finals squad, Sávio did play for Brazil at the 1995 Copa América, where the Seleção lost the final to Uruguay on penalties. He also won the bronze medal at the 1996 Summer Olympics in Atlanta, going on to collect a total of 21 full caps with four goals.

== Career statistics ==
=== Club ===
Appearances and goals by club, season and competition
Club	Season	League			Cup		Continental		Total	
Club	Season	Division	Apps	Goals	Apps	Goals	Apps	Goals	Apps	Goals
Real Madrid	1997–98	La Liga	12	3	1	0	2	0	15	3
Real Madrid	1998–99	La Liga	34	6	6	1	7	3	49	10
Real Madrid	1999–00	La Liga	25	4	2	0	11	4	42	9
Real Madrid	2000–01	La Liga	26	3	1	1	11	1	40	5
Real Madrid	2001–02	La Liga	8	0	1	1	4	2	14	3
Real Madrid	Total		105	16	11	3	35	10	160	30
Bordeaux (loan)	2002–03	Ligue 1	27	7	5	2	4	1	36	10
Real Zaragoza	2003–04	La Liga	29	2	5	1	0	0	34	3
Real Zaragoza	2004–05	La Liga	36	10	1	0	10	4	47	14
Real Zaragoza	2005–06	La Liga	30	4	2	0	0	0	32	4
Real Zaragoza	Total		95	16	8	1	10	4	113	21
Real Sociedad	2006–07	La Liga	19	5	0	0	0	0	19	5
Levante	2007–08	La Liga	12	0	0	0	0	0	12	0
Anorthosis Famagusta	2008–09	Cypriot First Division	16	4	0	0	4	1	20	5

- ^{1} Including one appearance in 1998 Intercontinental Cup, one appearance in 1998 UEFA Super Cup.
- ^{2} Including four appearances and one goal in 2000 FIFA Club World Championship.
- ^{3} Including one appearance in 2000 Intercontinental Cup, one appearance in 2000 UEFA Super Cup.
- ^{4} Including one appearance in 2001 Supercopa de España.

=== International ===
Appearances and goals by national team and year
National team	Year	Apps	Goals
Brazil	1994	2	0
Brazil	1995	12	1
Brazil	1996	6	3
Brazil	1999	1	0
Brazil	2000	1	0
Total		22	4

Scores and results list Brazil's goal tally first, score column indicates score after each Sávio goal.

List of international goals scored by Sávio
No.	Date	Venue	Opponent	Score	Result	Competition	Ref.
1	9 August 1995	National Stadium, Tokyo, Japan	Japan	5–1	5–1	Friendly	
2	12 January 1996	Los Angeles Memorial Coliseum, Los Angeles, United States	Canada	3–0	4–1	1996 CONCACAF Gold Cup	
3	14 January 1996	Los Angeles Memorial Coliseum, Los Angeles, United States	Honduras	4–0	5–0	1996 CONCACAF Gold Cup	
4	27 March 1996	Teixeirão, São José do Rio Preto, Brazil	Ghana	2–0	8–2	Friendly	

== Honours ==
Flamengo

- Campeonato Brasileiro Série A: 1992
- Campeonato Carioca: 1996
- Copa de Oro: 1996
- Copa do Brasil: 2006

Real Madrid

- La Liga: 2000–01
- Supercopa de España: 2001
- UEFA Champions League: 1997–98, 1999–2000, 2001–02
- Intercontinental Cup: 1998
- UEFA Super Cup: 2002

Zaragoza

- Copa del Rey: 2003–04; runner-up 2005–06
- Supercopa de España: 2004

Desportiva Capixaba

- Copa Espírito Santo: 2008

Avaí

- Campeonato Catarinense: 2010

Brazil

- Summer Olympic Games: Bronze medal 1996

Individual

- Copa de Oro top scorer: 1996
