= 2002–03 Segunda División =

72nd season of the second-tier football league in Spain

Segunda División
- Season: 2002-03
- Champions: Real Murcia (8th title)
- Promoted: Real Murcia; Real Zaragoza; Albacete Balompié
- Relegated: SD Compostela; Racing Ferrol; Real Oviedo; CD Badajoz
- Matches: 462
- Goals: 1,030 (2.23 per match)
- Top goalscorer: (Spain) Jesús Perera

The 2002–03 Segunda División season saw 22 teams participate in the second flight Spanish league. The teams that promoted to La Liga were Real Murcia, Real Zaragoza and Albacete Balompié. The teams that relegated to Segunda División B were SD Compostela, Racing de Ferrol, Real Oviedo and CD Badajoz.

== Teams ==
Location of teams in Segunda División 2002-03
Canary Islands

Team	Home city	Stadium	Capacity
Albacete	Albacete	Carlos Belmonte	18,000
Almería	Almería	Juan Rojas	13,468
Badajoz	Badajoz	Nuevo Vivero	15,198
Compostela	Santiago de Compostela	San Lázaro	12,000
Córdoba	Córdoba	Nuevo Arcángel	21,822
Eibar	Eibar	Ipurua	5,000
Elche	Elche	Martínez Valero	36,017
Getafe	Getafe	Coliseum Alfonso Pérez	17,393
Las Palmas	Las Palmas	Gran Canaria	32,400
Leganés	Leganés	Butarque	8,138
Levante	Valencia	Ciutat de València	26,354
Real Murcia	Murcia	La Condomina	16,000
Numancia	Soria	Los Pajaritos	8,261
Real Oviedo	Oviedo	Carlos Tartiere	30,500
Polideportivo Ejido	El Ejido	Santo Domingo	7,870
Racing Ferrol	Ferrol	A Malata	12,024
Salamanca	Villares de la Reina	Helmántico	17,341
Sporting de Gijón	Gijón	El Molinón	25,885
Tenerife	Santa Cruz de Tenerife	Heliodoro Rodríguez López	22,824
Terrassa	Terrassa	Olímpic de Terrassa	11,500
Xerez	Jerez de la Frontera	Chapín	20,523
Real Zaragoza	Zaragoza	La Romareda	33,608

=== Teams by autonomous community ===
	Autonomous community	Number of teams	Teams
1	Andalusia	4	Almería, Córdoba, Poli Ejido, Xerez
2	Asturias	2	Oviedo, Sporting
2	Canary Islands	2	Las Palmas, Tenerife
2	Castile and León	2	Numancia, Salamanca
2	Galicia	2	Compostela, Racing
2	Madrid	2	Getafe, Leganés
2	Valencia	2	Elche, Levante
8	Aragon	1	Zaragoza
8	Basque Country	1	Eibar
8	Castile-La Mancha	1	Albacete
8	Catalonia	1	Terrassa
8	Extremadura	1	Badajoz
8	Murcia	1	Murcia

== Final table ==
Pos	Team	Pld	W	D	L	GF	GA	GD	Pts	Promotion or relegation
1	Murcia (C, P)	42	23	10	9	59	22	+37	79	Promotion to La Liga
2	Zaragoza (P)	42	20	12	10	54	40	+14	72	Promotion to La Liga
3	Albacete (P)	42	17	20	5	51	30	+21	71	Promotion to La Liga
4	Levante	42	16	17	9	59	44	+15	65	
5	Las Palmas	42	16	16	10	53	43	+10	64 (Note: XER 2–2 LPA; LPA 4–0 XER)	
6	Xerez	42	17	13	12	55	53	+2	64	
7	Salamanca	42	14	18	10	44	32	+12	60	
8	Tenerife	42	13	18	11	53	39	+14	57	
9	Compostela (R)	42	14	13	15	54	56	−2	55 (Note: Compostela was relegated to Segunda División B because it was unable to cover a share capital expansion. Leganés was readmitted into Segunda División.)	Relegation to Segunda División B
10	Sporting Gijón	42	11	20	11	44	41	+3	53 (Note: GET 0–1 SPG; SPG 0–0 GET)	
11	Getafe	42	13	14	15	52	55	−3	53	
12	Terrassa	42	11	19	12	41	46	−5	52 (Note: TER: 8 pts; EJI: 4 pts; NUM: 3 pts)	
13	Poli Ejido	42	12	16	14	36	45	−9	52	
14	Numancia	42	12	16	14	48	52	−4	52	
15	Córdoba	42	12	14	16	36	38	−2	50 (Note: CÓR: 11 pts; ELC: 8 pts → ELC 0–0 EIB; EIB: 8 pts → EIB 0–1 ELC; ALM: 6 pts)	
16	Elche	42	12	14	16	49	52	−3	50	
17	Eibar	42	11	17	14	33	38	−5	50	
18	Almería	42	12	14	16	54	63	−9	50	
19	Leganés	42	11	15	16	44	51	−7	48	Spared from relegation
20	Racing Ferrol (R)	42	11	13	18	40	60	−20	46	Relegation to Segunda División B
21	Oviedo (R)	42	9	13	20	37	59	−22	40 (Note: Oviedo was relegated to Tercera División for not paying its players .)	Relegation to Tercera División
22	Badajoz (R)	42	10	8	24	34	71	−37	38	Relegation to Segunda División B

Source: LFP - Liga Adelante
Rules for classification: 1st points; 2nd head-to-head points; 3rd head-to-head goal difference; 4th head-to-head goals scored; 5th goal difference; 6th number of goals scored; 7th Fair-play points
(C) Champions; (P) Promoted; (R) Relegated

== Results ==
Home \ Away	ALB	ALM	BAD	COM	CÓR	EIB	ELC	GET	LPA	LEG	LEV	MUR	NUM	OVI	EJI	RFE	SAL	SPG	TEN	TER	XER	ZAR
Albacete	—	0–1	1–0	1–1	0–0	1–1	1–1	3–1	2–1	2–0	2–2	0–0	3–1	0–1	1–1	2–0	0–0	4–0	1–0	1–0	0–0	0–0
Almería	1–1	—	2–1	2–1	1–3	2–1	0–3	1–1	1–0	0–2	2–2	1–1	1–2	1–1	1–1	3–2	1–2	1–0	1–1	3–0	6–0	0–1
Badajoz	0–3	4–3	—	0–2	2–0	1–1	2–3	1–2	0–1	0–0	1–1	1–0	1–1	0–1	0–2	1–0	1–1	0–3	2–1	1–1	0–1	0–4
Compostela	3–3	4–1	3–0	—	1–2	1–0	0–1	1–3	0–3	2–0	3–1	1–0	1–0	0–1	2–2	1–1	0–0	2–3	1–1	2–1	0–1	0–0
Córdoba	0–2	3–0	0–0	0–0	—	0–0	1–0	3–0	2–2	1–0	1–2	0–2	1–1	1–0	0–1	1–2	0–2	1–1	1–1	0–2	1–3	2–1
Eibar	2–0	2–0	1–2	2–1	1–0	—	0–1	0–0	0–0	0–1	1–1	1–1	1–2	2–1	0–0	1–0	1–0	1–1	1–1	1–1	1–0	0–0
Elche	1–2	0–2	0–1	3–1	0–0	0–0	—	1–1	3–2	1–1	0–2	0–2	1–1	2–1	3–0	1–2	2–1	1–1	1–0	2–2	0–1	4–0
Getafe	1–2	1–1	0–1	2–0	1–1	4–2	1–1	—	0–0	0–3	2–2	3–1	1–1	1–1	2–0	3–1	1–0	0–1	2–1	2–1	2–1	1–2
Las Palmas	1–1	2–2	2–0	1–1	0–1	0–1	4–1	2–1	—	1–4	1–1	1–4	0–0	2–0	2–0	2–0	2–1	2–2	1–0	2–0	4–0	0–1
Leganés	1–1	5–2	1–3	0–0	0–3	0–1	2–2	2–1	1–1	—	0–1	0–1	2–1	0–1	2–0	1–0	0–2	0–2	1–1	1–1	1–2	2–0
Levante	2–2	2–1	4–0	3–4	1–2	3–1	2–2	1–0	1–1	4–0	—	0–0	0–0	1–0	2–2	1–0	0–1	2–1	2–1	1–0	0–0	3–2
Murcia	0–0	3–0	2–0	2–0	1–0	4–2	1–0	2–0	6–1	0–1	1–0	—	2–1	0–1	3–0	5–0	1–1	0–0	2–0	0–0	1–1	2–0
Numancia	1–2	0–0	4–0	2–2	0–0	1–0	1–0	1–3	0–1	2–1	0–2	0–2	—	4–2	2–2	4–2	1–0	1–0	1–0	1–1	1–4	2–2
Oviedo	0–0	1–1	2–1	1–1	1–0	1–2	2–1	3–4	0–0	1–1	1–2	0–1	1–1	—	0–3	1–2	0–3	2–1	0–2	2–2	1–2	0–2
Poli Ejido	0–1	2–0	1–0	0–2	2–1	0–0	2–0	1–1	0–0	1–0	0–0	0–1	3–2	1–0	—	1–1	1–1	1–0	0–1	1–2	2–0	0–0
Racing Ferrol	2–1	1–1	2–0	1–1	0–0	0–1	1–0	2–1	1–2	1–1	1–0	0–3	1–0	1–1	1–1	—	1–1	2–1	0–1	1–1	2–1	1–2
Salamanca	0–1	2–1	0–1	4–2	2–0	0–0	1–3	3–1	2–1	1–1	1–1	0–0	0–0	0–0	2–0	0–0	—	0–0	2–1	1–2	1–1	0–1
Sporting	0–1	2–2	4–0	1–3	0–0	1–0	0–0	0–0	0–0	1–1	3–2	1–0	1–2	1–0	1–1	3–1	1–1	—	2–1	0–0	1–1	1–1
Tenerife	1–1	1–1	3–3	5–1	2–0	1–0	0–0	1–0	0–0	1–1	0–0	2–1	2–0	1–1	4–0	4–0	0–0	2–2	—	1–1	1–3	2–0
Terrassa	1–1	0–2	1–0	2–1	0–4	1–0	1–1	1–1	0–1	2–0	1–1	0–1	1–1	2–2	2–0	2–1	1–0	0–0	1–1	—	2–0	0–2
Xerez	1–0	1–2	5–3	0–1	1–0	1–1	2–1	0–0	2–2	2–2	2–1	2–0	2–2	4–1	2–1	1–1	0–1	1–0	1–1	2–2	—	1–3
Zaragoza	1–1	1–0	2–0	0–1	0–0	2–0	5–2	3–1	1–2	2–2	1–0	1–0	1–0	3–1	0–0	2–2	1–3	1–1	1–3	1–0	1–0	—

Source: BDFutbol
Legend: Blue = home team win; Yellow = draw; Red = away team win.
