= 2003–04 Copa del Rey =

102nd Copa del Rey

Tournament details
- Country: Spain

Final positions
- Champions: Zaragoza (6th title)
- Runners-up: Real Madrid

Tournament statistics
- Top goal scorer(s): Raúl (6 goals)

The 2003–04 Copa del Rey was the 102nd staging of the Copa del Rey.

The competition began on 24 August 2003 and concluded on 17 March 2004 with the final, held at the Estadi Olímpic Lluís Companys in Barcelona, in which Zaragoza lifted the trophy following a 3–2 victory over Real Madrid after extra time. The final match was played six days after the 2004 Madrid train bombings and three days after the 2004 Spanish general election.

== First round ==
First leg:

24 August 2003
Badalona	1–3	Sabadell
Benidorm	1–2	Alicante
Caudal	2–2	Real Unión
CCD Cerceda	0–0	Barakaldo
Cerro de Reyes	2–1	Universidad de Las Palmas
Conquense	0–0	Burgos
Fraga	1–3	Mirandés
Granada 74	0–0	Cacereño
Hellín Deportivo	0–3	San Sebastián
Lanzarote	2–0	Logroñés
Palencia	1–1	Cultural Leonesa
Vecindario	1–0	Extremadura
Velarde	0–1	Gimnástica Torrelavega
Vilafranca de Bonany	0–0	Lorca Deportiva
Villanueva de Córdoba	0–1	Ceuta
Zalla	1–2	Pontevedra
Zamora	1–1	Alcorcón

Second leg:

10 September 2003
Sabadell	0–2	Badalona	Agg: 3–3 (a)
Alicante	1–1	Benidorm	Agg: 3–2
Real Unión	3–1	Caudal	Agg: 5–3
Barakaldo	2–0	CCD Cerceda	Agg: 2–0
Universidad de Las Palmas	0–1	Cerro de Reyes	Agg: 1–3
Burgos	1–2	Conquense	Agg: 1–2
Mirandés	1–0	Fraga	Agg: 4–1
Cacereño	1–0	Granada 74	Agg: 1–0
San Sebastián	2–0	Hellín Deportivo	Agg: 5–0
Logroñés	3–2	Lanzarote	Agg: 3–4
Cultural Leonesa	2–1	Palencia	Agg: 3–2
Extremadura	2–1	Vecindario	Agg: 2–2 (a)
Gimnástica Torrelavega	2–0	Velarde	Agg: 3–0
Lorca Deportiva	3–0	Vilafranca de Bonany	Agg: 3–0
Ceuta	1–1 (a.e.t.)	Villanueva de Córdoba	Agg: 2–1
Pontevedra	4–0	Zalla	Agg: 6–1
Alcorcón	1–4	Zamora	Agg: 2–5

== Round of 64 ==
8 October 2003
Elche	2–3	Espanyol
Alicante	1–2	Villarreal
Badajoz	1–4	Real Betis
Barakaldo	0–1	Racing Santander
Castellón	1–3	Valencia
Ceuta	0–1 (a.e.t.)	Málaga
Compostela	0–1	Deportivo La Coruña
Conquense	2–3	Atlético Madrid
Gimnástica Torrelavega	2–1	Athletic Bilbao
Gramenet	0–1	Barcelona
Cultural Leonesa	1–0	Albacete
Lorca Deportiva	1–2	Real Murcia
Mirandés	1–2	Zaragoza
Pontevedra	1–1 (4–5 p.)	Celta Vigo
Real Unión	0–2	Osasuna
Sabadell	2–4	Mallorca
San Sebastián	0–3	Real Madrid
Zamora	0–2	Valladolid
Cerro de Reyes	1–7	Sevilla
Oviedo	1–2	Real Sociedad
Getafe	1–2	Leganés
Recreativo Huelva	0–0 (2–3 p.)	Almería
Las Palmas	1–2 (a.e.t.)	Córdoba
Numancia	0–1	Ciudad de Murcia
Salamanca	1–0	Rayo Vallecano
Sporting Gijón	0–1	Eibar
Tenerife	0–1 (a.e.t.)	Cádiz
Terrassa	0–1	Levante
Cacereño	1–2	Xerez
Racing de Ferrol	1–1 (1–2 p.)	Alavés
Lanzarote	4–2	Polideportivo Ejido
Vecindario	0–1 (a.e.t.)	Algeciras

== Round of 32 ==
16 December 2003
Alavés	2–1	Real Sociedad
Algeciras	0–1	Villarreal
Celta Vigo	3–1	Espanyol
Cultural Leonesa	0–1	Atlético Madrid
Leganés	3–4 (a.e.t.)	Real Madrid
17 December 2003
Almería	1–3	Valladolid
Cádiz	1–2	Osasuna
Ciudad de Murcia	0–4	Barcelona
Córdoba	1–3	Real Betis
Eibar	0–0 (3–2 p.)	Racing Santander
Gimnástica Torrelavega	1–2	Deportivo La Coruña
Lanzarote	0–1	Sevilla
Levante	2–0	Mallorca
Salamanca	2–3 (a.e.t.)	Zaragoza
Valencia	2–0	Real Murcia
Xerez	0–1	Málaga

== Knock-out rounds ==
First round
1	Eibar	1	0	1
16	Real Madrid	1	2	3
8	Valencia	2	2	4
9	Osasuna	2	0	2
5	Villarreal	1	2	3
12	Sevilla (a)	3	0	3
4	Atlético Madrid (a)	0	1	1
13	Deportivo La Coruña	0	1	1
6	Alavés (a)	0	1	1
11	Valladolid	0	1	1
3	Málaga	0	2	2
14	Celta Vigo	1	2	3
7	Levante	1	1	2
10	Barcelona	0	3	3
2	Zaragoza	3	1	4
15	Real Betis	1	1	2

Quarter-finals
Real Madrid	3	2	5
Valencia	0	1	1
Sevilla	4	2	6
Atlético Madrid	0	1	1
Alavés	4	0	4
Celta Vigo	2	1	3
Barcelona	0	1	1
Zaragoza	1	1	2

Semi-finals
Real Madrid	2	0	2
Sevilla	0	1	1
Alavés	1	0	1
Zaragoza (a)	1	0	1

Final
Real Madrid	2
Zaragoza (a.e.t.)	3

== Round of 16 ==
Team 1	Agg.	Team 2	1st leg	2nd leg
Atlético Madrid	1–1 (a)	Deportivo La Coruña	0–0	1–1
Alavés	1–1 (a)	Valladolid	0–0	1–1
Eibar	1–3	Real Madrid	1–1	0–2
Málaga	2–3	Celta Vigo	0–1	2–2
Zaragoza	4–2	Real Betis	3–1	1–1
Valencia	4–2	Osasuna	2–2	2–0
Levante	2–3	Barcelona	1–0	1–3
Villarreal	3–3 (a)	Sevilla	1–3	2–0

First leg:

6 January 2004
Atlético Madrid	0–0	Deportivo La Coruña
7 January 2004
Alavés	0–0	Valladolid
Eibar	1–1	Real Madrid
Málaga	0–1	Celta Vigo
Zaragoza	3–1	Real Betis
Valencia	2–2	Osasuna
8 January 2004
Levante	1–0	Barcelona
Villarreal	1–3	Sevilla

Second leg:

13 January 2004
Real Madrid	2–0	Eibar	Agg: 3–1
14 January 2004
Valladolid	1–1	Alavés	Agg: 1–1 (a)
Celta Vigo	2–2	Málaga	Agg: 3–2
Real Betis	1–1	Zaragoza	Agg: 2–4
Barcelona	3–1	Levante	Agg: 3–2
Osasuna	0–2	Valencia	Agg: 2–4
15 January 2004
Deportivo La Coruña	1–1	Atlético Madrid	Agg: 1–1 (a)
Sevilla	0–2	Villarreal	Agg: 3–3 (a)

== Quarter-finals ==
Team 1	Agg.	Team 2	1st leg	2nd leg
Sevilla	6–1	Atlético Madrid	4–0	2–1
Real Madrid	5–1	Valencia	3–0	2–1
Alavés	4–3	Celta Vigo	4–2	0–1
Barcelona	1–2	Zaragoza	0–1	1–1

=== First leg ===
21 January 2004	Sevilla	4–0	Atlético Madrid	Ramón Sánchez Pizjuán, Seville
20:00 CEST	Silva 20'; Reyes 24'; Alfaro 28'; Baptista 74'	Report		Attendance: 30,000; Referee: Miguel Ángel Pérez Lasa

21 January 2004	Real Madrid	3–0	Valencia	Santiago Bernabéu, Madrid
21:30 CEST	Raúl 31'; Ronaldo 81'; Figo 86' (pen.)	Report		Attendance: 65,000; Referee: Luis Medina Cantalejo

22 January 2004	Alavés	4–2	Celta Vigo	Mendizorroza, Vitoria-Gasteiz
20:00 CEST	Navarro 22', 38', 51'; Magno 53'	Report	Pinilla 9', 49'	Attendance: 9,461; Referee: Alfonso Pérez Burrull

22 January 2004	Barcelona	0–1	Zaragoza	Camp Nou, Barcelona
21:30 CEST		Report	Villa 74' (pen.)	Attendance: 46,506; Referee: Carlos Megía Dávila

=== Second leg ===
28 January 2004	Atlético Madrid	1–2 (1–6 agg.)	Sevilla	Vicente Calderón, Madrid
20:00 CEST	Torres 12'	Report	Baptista 86'; Silva 88'	Attendance: 20,000; Referee: Julián Rodríguez Santiago

28 January 2004	Celta Vigo	1–0 (3–4 agg.)	Alavés	Estadio Balaídos, Vigo
20:00 CEST	López 68'	Report		Attendance: 15,000; Referee: Víctor Esquinas Torres

28 January 2004	Valencia	1–2 (1–5 agg.)	Real Madrid	Mestalla, Valencia
21:30 CEST	Xisco 73'	Report	Raúl 14'; Zidane 90'	Attendance: 42,000; Referee: Fernando Carmona Méndez

29 January 2004	Zaragoza	1–1 (2–1 agg.)	Barcelona	La Romareda, Zaragoza
21:00 CEST	Yordi 85'	Report	L. García 12'	Attendance: 28,000; Referee: Alberto Undiano Mallenco

== Semi-finals ==
Team 1	Agg.	Team 2	1st leg	2nd leg
Real Madrid	2–1	Sevilla	2–0	0–1
Alavés	1–1 (a)	Zaragoza	1–1	0–0

=== First leg ===
4 February 2004	Real Madrid	2–0	Sevilla	Santiago Bernabéu, Madrid
21:00 CEST	Solari 56'; Raúl 76'	Report		Referee: Javier Turienzo Álvarez

5 February 2004	Alavés	1–1	Zaragoza	Mendizorroza, Vitoria-Gasteiz
21:00 CEST	Vučko 17'	Report	Sávio 89'	Attendance: 14,400; Referee: Rafael Ramírez Domínguez

=== Second leg ===
11 February 2004	Sevilla	1–0 (1–2 agg.)	Real Madrid	Ramón Sánchez Pizjuán, Seville
21:00 CEST	López 1'	Report		Attendance: 45,000; Referee: Eduardo Iturralde González

12 February 2004	Zaragoza	0–0 (1 (a) –1 agg.)	Alavés	La Romareda, Zaragoza
21:00 CEST		Report		Attendance: 32,000; Referee: Manuel Mejuto González

== Final ==
17 March 2004
21:00 CET

Real Madrid	2–3 (a.e.t.)	Zaragoza
Beckham 24'; Roberto Carlos 47'	Report	Dani 28'; Villa 45' (pen.); Galletti 112'

Estadi Olímpic Lluís Companys, Barcelona
Attendance: 54,000
Referee: Fernando Carmona Méndez (Extremadura)

== Top goalscorers ==
Rank	Player	Club	Goals
1	(Spain) Raúl	Real Madrid	6
2	(Brazil) Júlio Baptista	Sevilla	5
3	(Spain) David Villa	Zaragoza	4
3	(Uruguay) Darío Silva	Sevilla	4
3	(Spain) Rubén Navarro	Alavés	4
6	(Brazil) Ronaldinho	Barcelona	3
6	(Spain) Salva Ballesta	Málaga	3
6	(Brazil) Vágner	Celta Vigo	3
6	(Cameroon) Pierre Webó	Osasuna	3
6	(Spain) Rubén Baraja	Valencia	3
6	(Uruguay) Fernando Correa	Mallorca	3
6	(Uruguay) Germán Hornos	Sevilla	3
