= 2003–04 Albacete Balompié season =

Albacete Balompié
2003–04 season
- President: Ángel Contreras Plasencia
- Manager: César Ferrando
- Stadium: Carlos Belmonte
- La Liga: 14th
- Copa del Rey: Round of 64
- Top goalscorer: League: Carlos Aranda (8); All: Carlos Aranda (8)

The 2003–04 season was the 63rd season in Albacete Balompié's history.

== Squad ==
Retrieved on 30 December 2020

Note: Flags indicate national team as defined under FIFA eligibility rules; some limited exceptions apply. Players may hold more than one non-FIFA nationality.

No.	Pos.	Nation	Player
1	GK	ESP	Manuel Almunia (on loan from Celta Vigo)
2	DF	ESP	Óscar Montiel
3	DF	ESP	Miquel Buades
4	MF	FRA	Laurent Viaud
5	DF	ESP	Pedro
6	MF	ESP	José Simeón
7	MF	ESP	Líbero Parri (on loan from Valencia)
8	FW	NGA	Abass Lawal
9	DF	ESP	Fernando Navarro (on loan from Barcelona)
10	MF	ESP	Iván Díaz
11	MF	BRA	Fabiano
12	DF	ARG	Gustavo Siviero
13	GK	ARG	Carlos Roa
14	FW	ESP	Carlos Aranda
15	DF	ESP	Unai (on loan from Villarreal)
16	MF	ESP	David Sánchez

No.	Pos.	Nation	Player
17	MF	ROU	Cătălin Munteanu (on loan from Atlético Madrid)
18	MF	ESP	Álvaro Rubio
19	DF	ESP	Paco Peña
20	FW	URU	Antonio Pacheco (on loan from Internazionale)
21	FW	ESP	Mikel
22	DF	ESP	Pablo Ibáñez
23	MF	FRA	Ludovic Delporte
24	FW	ESP	Basti
25	GK	ESP	Joaquín Moso
26	MF	ESP	Pablo García López
27	MF	ESP	Pablo Redondo
31	FW	ESP	Manuel Gato
—	DF	ARG	Christian Díaz
—	FW	ARG	Gabriel Amato
—	FW	BRA	Cacá

=== Out on loan ===
Note: Flags indicate national team as defined under FIFA eligibility rules; some limited exceptions apply. Players may hold more than one non-FIFA nationality.

No.	Pos.	Nation	Player
—	MF	ESP	Manolo (on loan at Levante)

=== Transfers ===
==== In ====
#	Pos	Player	From	Notes
Summer
1	GK	(Spain) Manuel Almunia	(Spain) Celta Vigo	Loan
8	FW	(Nigeria) Abass Lawal	(Spain) Leganés	
14	FW	(Spain) Carlos Aranda	(Spain) Numancia	
15	DF	(Spain) Unai	(Spain) Villarreal	Loan
16	MF	(Spain) David Sánchez	(Spain) Barcelona B	
20	FW	(Uruguay) Antonio Pacheco	(Italy) Internazionale	Loan
25	GK	(Spain) Joaquín Moso	(Spain) SD Eibar	Loan return
27	MF	(Spain) Pablo Redondo	(Spain) Valencia Mestalla	
	DF	(Argentina) Christian Díaz	(Spain) Levante	
	MF	(Spain) Manolo	(Spain) Atlético Madrid B	
	FW	(Argentina) Gabriel Amato	(Spain) Levante	
	FW	(Brazil) Cacá	(Brazil) Mirassol	
Winter
9	DF	(Spain) Fernando Navarro	(Spain) Barcelona	Loan
11	MF	(Brazil) Fabiano	(Saudi Arabia) Al-Ettifaq	

==== Out ====
#	Pos	Player	To	Notes
Summer
1	GK	(Spain) Carlos Cano	(Spain) Almería	
3	DF	(Spain) José Antonio Padilla	(Spain) Terrassa	
7	MF	(Spain) Pablo Sierra	(Spain) Racing Santander	Loan return
9	FW	(Argentina) Carlos Duré	(Argentina) Olimpo	
14	MF	(Spain) Dani Ruiz	(Spain) Alcorcón	
15	FW	(Spain) Jesús Perera	(Spain) Real Mallorca	
17	MF	(Spain) Martín Irazoki	(Spain) Cartagena FC	
20	MF	(Spain) Rodri	(Spain) Castellón	
25	MF	(Spain) Jandro	(Spain) Celta Vigo	Loan return
	MF	(Spain) Manolo	(Spain) Levante	Loan
	MF	(Spain) Pruden	(Spain) Toledo	
Winter
	DF	(Argentina) Christian Díaz	(Spain) Ciudad de Murcia	
	FW	(Argentina) Gabriel Amato	(Argentina) Banfield	
	FW	(Brazil) Cacá	(Brazil) Académica	Loan

== Squad stats ==
Last updated on 29 December 2020.

No.	Pos	Nat	Player	Total		La Liga		Copa del Rey	
No.	Pos	Nat	Player	Apps	Goals	Apps	Goals	Apps	Goals
1	GK	(Spain) ESP	Manuel Almunia	25	0	24	0	1	0
2	DF	(Spain) ESP	Óscar Montiel	35	0	35	0	0	0
3	DF	(Spain) ESP	Miquel Buades	25	0	24	0	1	0
4	MF	(France) FRA	Laurent Viaud	33	1	32+1	1	0	0
5	DF	(Spain) ESP	Pedro	3	0	2	0	1	0
6	MF	(Spain) ESP	José Simeón	4	0	0+3	0	1	0
7	MF	(Spain) ESP	Líbero Parri	29	6	21+8	6	0	0
8	FW	(Nigeria) NGA	Abass Lawal	5	0	5	0	0	0
9	DF	(Spain) ESP	Fernando Navarro	7	0	5+2	0	0	0
10	MF	(Spain) ESP	Iván Díaz	15	0	12+3	0	0	0
11	MF	(Brazil) BRA	Fabiano	12	1	7+5	1	0	0
12	DF	(Argentina) ARG	Gustavo Siviero	4	0	4	0	0	0
13	GK	(Argentina) ARG	Carlos Roa	14	0	14	0	0	0
14	FW	(Spain) ESP	Carlos Aranda	25	8	19+6	8	0	0
15	DF	(Spain) ESP	Unai	15	0	12+2	0	1	0
16	MF	(Spain) ESP	David Sánchez	30	1	16+13	1	0+1	0
17	MF	(Romania) ROU	Cătălin Munteanu	18	0	17	0	1	0
18	MF	(Spain) ESP	Álvaro Rubio	24	0	13+10	0	1	0
19	DF	(Spain) ESP	Paco Peña	32	0	30+2	0	0	0
20	FW	(Uruguay) URU	Antonio Pacheco	34	7	29+4	7	1	0
21	FW	(Spain) ESP	Mikel	29	5	8+21	5	0	0
22	DF	(Spain) ESP	Pablo Ibáñez	35	1	35	1	0	0
23	MF	(France) FRA	Ludovic Delporte	22	2	18+4	2	0	0
24	FW	(Spain) ESP	Basti	14	1	4+10	1	0	0
25	GK	(Spain) ESP	Joaquín Moso	0	0	0	0	0	0
26	MF	(Spain) ESP	Pablo García López	15	0	6+8	0	1	0
27	MF	(Spain) ESP	Pablo Redondo	19	3	15+3	3	0+1	0
31	FW	(Spain) ESP	Manuel Gato	1	0	0+1	0	0	0
Players who have left the club after the start of the season:
	DF	(Argentina) ARG	Christian Díaz	8	0	5+2	0	1	0
	FW	(Argentina) ARG	Gabriel Amato	9	0	5+3	0	1	0
	FW	(Brazil) BRA	Cacá	3	0	1+1	0	0+1	0

== Competitions ==
=== Overall ===
Competition	Final position
La Liga	14th
Copa del Rey	Round of 64

=== La Liga ===
==== League table ====
Pos	Team	Pld	W	D	L	GF	GA	GD	Pts	Qualification or relegation
12	Zaragoza	38	13	9	16	46	55	−9	48 (Note: OSA 0–1 ZAR; ZAR 1–0 OSA)	Qualification for the UEFA Cup first round (Note: Zaragoza entered UEFA Cup as winners of 2003–04 Copa del Rey.)
13	Osasuna	38	11	15	12	38	37	+1	48	
14	Albacete	38	13	8	17	40	48	−8	47	
15	Real Sociedad	38	11	13	14	49	53	−4	46	
16	Espanyol	38	13	4	21	48	64	−16	43	

Source: LFP
Rules for classification: 1st points; 2nd head-to-head points; 3rd head-to-head goal difference; 4th head-to-head goals scored; 5th goal difference; 6th number of goals scored; 7th Fair-play points

==== Matches ====
Win Draw Loss

Match	Opponent	Venue	Result
1	Osasuna	H	0–2
2	Atlético Madrid	A	0–1
3	Barcelona	H	1–2
4	Deportivo La Coruña	A	0–3
5	Real Mallorca	H	2–0
6	Real Murcia	A	0–1
7	Real Sociedad	H	3–1
8	Real Betis	A	2–3
9	Villarreal	H	2–0
10	Real Valladolid	A	0–2
11	Málaga	H	0–1
12	Real Madrid	A	1–2
13	Espanyol	H	2–1
14	Celta Vigo	A	2–2
15	Racing Santander	H	4–0
16	Real Zaragoza	A	1–0
17	Athletic Bilbao	H	1–1
18	Sevilla	A	0–2
19	Valencia	H	0–1

Match	Opponent	Venue	Result
20	Osasuna	A	1–1
21	Atlético Madrid	H	1–1
22	Barcelona	A	0–5
23	Deportivo La Coruña	H	0–2
24	Real Mallorca	A	0–0
25	Real Murcia	H	1–0
26	Real Sociedad	A	1–0
27	Real Betis	H	1–0
28	Villarreal	A	1–2
29	Real Valladolid	H	2–0
30	Málaga	A	1–1
31	Real Madrid	H	1–2
32	Espanyol	A	1–1
33	Celta Vigo	H	0–2
34	Racing Santander	A	2–0
35	Real Zaragoza	H	3–1
36	Athletic Bilbao	A	1–1
37	Sevilla	H	1–4
38	Valencia	A	1–0

=== Copa del Rey ===
Win Draw Loss

Round	Opponent	Venue	Result
Round of 64	Cultural Leonesa	A	0–1
