= Pablo Sierra =

Pablo Sierra may refer to:

- Pablo Sierra (footballer) (born 1978), Spanish footballer
- Pablo Sierra (runner) (born 1969), Spanish long-distance runner
