= Pablo Redondo =

Spanish footballer (born 1982)

Personal information
- Full name: Pablo Redondo Martínez
- Date of birth: 17 April 1982 (age 44)
- Place of birth: Valencia, Spain
- Height: 1.83 m (6 ft 0 in)
- Position: Attacking midfielder

Youth career
- Valencia

Senior career*
Years	Team	Apps	(Gls)
2001–2003	Valencia B	69	(12)
2003	Valencia	1	(0)
2003–2005	Albacete	48	(8)
2005–2008	Getafe	49	(3)
2008–2010	Gimnàstic	41	(4)
2010–2012	Xerez	73	(11)
2012–2013	Hércules	20	(0)
2013	Salamanca	0	(0)
2014–2015	Eldense	3	(0)
2015	Callosa Deportiva		
2016	Torrevieja	1	(0)
2016	Silla	6	(0)
2017	Olímpic Xàtiva	15	(1)
2019	Castellonense	5	(0)
Total		331	(39)
- * Club domestic league appearances and goals

Pablo Redondo Martínez (born 17 April 1982) is a Spanish former professional footballer who played as an attacking midfielder.

== Club career ==
Born in Valencia, Redondo was a product of Valencia CF's youth system, and he appeared once for the first team, playing 22 minutes in a 3–0 away win against Sevilla FC on 21 June 2003. At the season's end, he moved to fellow La Liga club Albacete Balompié.

Redondo signed for Madrid's Getafe CF ahead of the 2005–06 campaign. On 1 October 2005, he scored in a 2–1 home victory over his previous employer but, after two seasons as an important squad member, he was not registered in 2007–08 due to injury.

In 2008–09, Redondo moved to Gimnàstic de Tarragona of Segunda División, on a two-year contract. After only 11 matches in his second year he was released, immediately signing with another side in the second tier, Xerez CD.

On 5 December 2012, Hércules CF acquired both Redondo and Mario Rosas, who were free agents. In August of the following year, the former joined newly formed Salamanca AC.
