= 2009–10 Arsenal F.C. season =

English football club season

Arsenal F.C.
2009–10 season
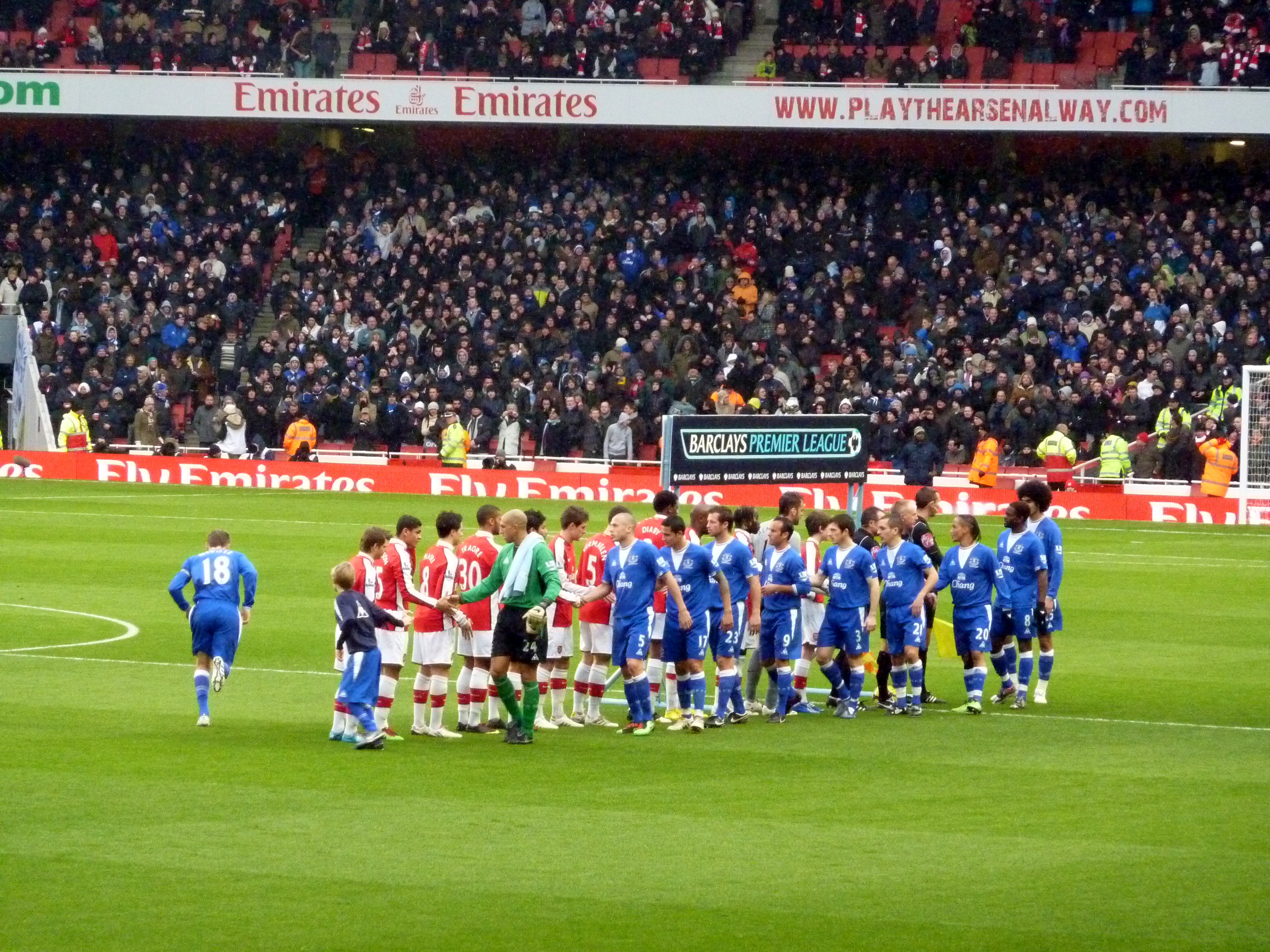
- Arsenal and Everton players shake hands before their Premier League game at the Emirates
- Chairman: Peter Hill-Wood
- Manager: Arsène Wenger
- Stadium: Emirates Stadium
- Premier League: 3rd
- FA Cup: Fourth round
- League Cup: Fifth round
- UEFA Champions League: Quarter-finals
- Top goalscorer: League: Cesc Fàbregas (15); All: Cesc Fàbregas (19)
- Highest home attendance: 60,103 (vs. Tottenham Hotspur, 31 October 2009)
- Lowest home attendance: 56,592 (vs. West Bromwich Albion, 22 September 2009)
- Average home league attendance: 59,920
Home colours	Away colours	Third colours

The 2009–10 season was Arsenal Football Club's 18th season in the Premier League and their 84th consecutive season in the top flight of English football. It began on 1 July 2009 and concluded on 30 June 2010, with competitive matches played between August and May. The club ended the Premier League campaign in third position, 11 points behind champions Chelsea. In the domestic cup competitions, Arsenal were knocked out in the fourth round of the FA Cup to Stoke City and the fifth round of the League Cup against Manchester City. They failed to progress past the quarter-finals of the UEFA Champions League, losing to reigning champions Barcelona in a two-legged tie.

Arsenal did little business in the transfer market; their only outfield signing of the summer was defender Thomas Vermaelen from Ajax. Several players however left the club before the campaign got under way, including Emmanuel Adebayor and Kolo Touré in separate deals to Manchester City. To reinvigorate the side and benefit from Cesc Fàbregas's creativity, manager Arsène Wenger instituted a fluid 4–3–3 formation. The team made an impressive start; by November they had scored 36 goals in 11 league games and qualified for the Champions League knockout stage with a game to spare. Arsenal's defensive fragility was a recurring theme throughout the season and meant the team struggled to sustain a title challenge; they suffered back-to-back Premier League losses on four occasions.

41 different players represented Arsenal in four competitions and there were 14 different goalscorers. Arsenal's top goalscorer was Fàbregas, who scored 19 goals in 36 appearances.

== Background ==
=== Transfers ===
Arsenal made one outfield signing during the summer, defender Thomas Vermaelen from Ajax in a deal estimated at £10 million. Several players were let go, including Amaury Bischoff who joined in 2008 and played the majority of his football in the reserves and Rui Fonte. Striker Emmanuel Adebayor was sold to Manchester City for a fee of £25 million and Kolo Touré soon joined him, ending a seven-year association with Arsenal. His former teammate Sol Campbell rejoined the club during the winter transfer window, having been a free agent. Wenger, who signed him to bolster the squad's defensive options, said: "He has a fantastic attitude and good fitness. Of course he is not the youngest but he is in a very good shape. He can still play in the Premier League. He is important in the dressing room as well. He's positive with the young players."

A number of players were loaned out during the season for game time and career development. Goalkeeper Wojciech Szczęsny joined Brentford in November 2009 and stayed their for the remainder of the season, while in the January window Jack Wilshere and Philippe Senderos moved to Bolton Wanderers and Everton respectively.

==== In ====
No.	Position	Player	Transferred from	Fee	Date	Ref
5	DF	Thomas Vermaelen	Ajax	£10,000,000	19 June 2009	
	MF	Samuel Galindo	Real América	Free transfer	15 January 2010	
31	DF	Sol Campbell	Free agent	Free transfer	16 January 2010	

==== Out ====
No.	Position	Player	Transferred to	Fee	Date	Ref
28	MF	Amaury Bischoff	Académica de Coimbra	Free transfer (Released)	30 June 2009	
39	FW	Rui Fonte	Sporting CP	Free transfer (Released)	30 June 2009	
49	DF	Paul Rodgers	Northampton Town	Free transfer (Released)	30 June 2009	
25	FW	Emmanuel Adebayor	Manchester City	£25,000,000	20 July 2009	
5	DF	Kolo Touré	Manchester City	£16,000,000	29 July 2009	

==== Loan out ====
No.	Position	Player	Loaned from	Date	Loan expires	Ref
	DF	Pedro Botelho	Celta Vigo	23 July 2009	End of the season	
	DF	Håvard Nordtveit	1. FC Nürnberg	7 August 2009	End of the season	
38	MF	Jay Emmanuel-Thomas	Blackpool	17 August 2009	17 November 2009	
45	MF	Henri Lansbury	Watford	21 August 2009	End of the season	
50	FW	Jay Simpson	Queens Park Rangers	27 August 2009	End of the season	
44	DF	Gavin Hoyte	Brighton & Hove Albion	9 October 2009	End of the season	
53	GK	Wojciech Szczęsny	Brentford	20 November 2009	End of the season	
47	FW	Rhys Murphy	Brentford	24 November 2009	24 February 2010	
48	MF	Mark Randall	Milton Keynes Dons	15 January 2010	End of the season	
42	DF	Kerrea Gilbert	Peterborough United	15 January 2010	End of the season	
6	DF	Philippe Senderos	Everton	25 January 2010	End of the season	
19	MF	Jack Wilshere	Bolton Wanderers	29 January 2010	End of the season	
54	MF	Sanchez Watt	Southend United	1 February 2010	28 February 2010	
34	DF	Kyle Bartley	Sheffield United	9 February 2010	12 May 2010	
51	FW	Gilles Sunu	Derby County	19 February 2010	End of the season	
38	MF	Jay Emmanuel-Thomas	Doncaster Rovers	27 February 2010	End of the season	
46	DF	Luke Ayling	Yeovil Town	17 March 2010	End of the season	
54	MF	Sanchez Watt	Leeds United	25 March 2010	End of the season	

== Pre-season ==
18 July 2009	Barnet	2–2	Arsenal	Barnet
15:00 BST	Yakubu 45'; Charles 83'	Report	43' Arshavin; 51' Barazite	Stadium: Underhill Stadium; Attendance: 5,099

21 July 2009	SC Columbia (Austria)	1–7	(England) Arsenal	Columbiaplatz
18:30 CEST	Lehner 35'	Report	36', 44' Bendtner; 39', 83' Ramsey; 56' (pen.), 73' Van Persie; 77' Gallas	Stadium: Schwarzlackenau Stadium; Attendance: 6,900

27 July 2009	Szombathelyi Haladás (Hungary)	0–5	(England) Arsenal	Szombathely
19:00 CEST		Report	17', 43' Bendtner; 24', 40' Eduardo; 66' (pen.) Van Persie	Stadium: Rohonci Street Stadium; Attendance: 12,500

29 July 2009	Hannover 96 (Germany)	0–1	(England) Arsenal	Hanover
19:00 CEST	Balitsch (yellow card); Haggui (yellow card)	https://www.arsenal.com/match/report/0809/post/first-team/hannover-96-0-1-arsenal-match-report Report]	8' Fàbregas; (yellow card) Bendtner; (yellow card) Van Persie; (yellow card) Sagna	Stadium: AWD-Arena; Attendance: 31,412

1 August 2009 Emirates Cup	Arsenal (England)	2–1	(Spain) Atlético Madrid	London
16:15 BST	Arshavin 86', 90'	Report	(yellow card) 29' Juanito; (yellow card) 44' Ujfaluši; 88' Pacheco	Stadium: Emirates Stadium; Attendance: 54,224; Referee: Mark Clattenburg

2 August 2009 Emirates Cup	Arsenal (England)	3–0	(Scotland) Rangers	London
16:15 BST	Wilshere 2', 72'; Eduardo 11'	Report	(yellow card) 50' McCulloch	Stadium: Emirates Stadium; Attendance: 56,758; Referee: Mike Dean

8 August 2009	Valencia (Spain)	2–0	(England) Arsenal	Valencia
21:30 CEST	Míchel 75'; Villa 90'	Report		Stadium: Mestalla Stadium; Attendance: 55,000

== Premier League ==
A total of 20 teams competed in the Premier League in the 2009–10 season. Each team played 38 matches; two against every other team and one match at each club's stadium. Three points were awarded for each win, one point per draw, and none for defeats. At the end of the season the top three teams qualified for the group stages of the UEFA Champions League; the team in fourth needed to play a qualifier.

The provisional fixture list was released on 17 June 2009, but was subject to change in the event of clashes with other competitions, inclement weather, or matches being selected for television coverage.

=== August–October ===
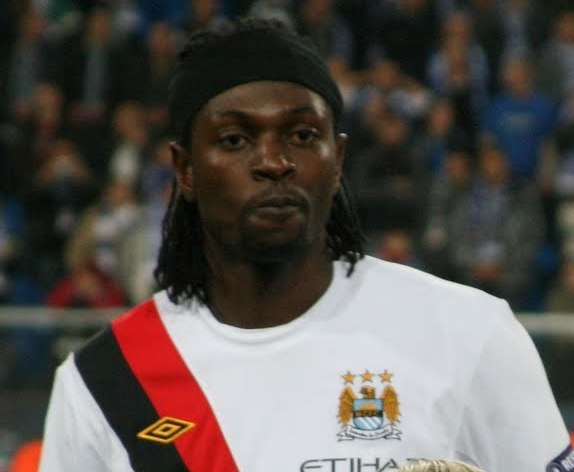
Emmanuel Adebayor scored against Arsenal and reacted by celebrating in front of the visiting supporters.

The league campaign began for Arsenal with a trip to Goodison Park to face Everton on 15 August 2009. Denílson scored the opening goal four minutes before the half-hour and Vermaelen doubled Arsenal's lead, heading the ball in from a Robin van Persie cross. Everton's failure to mark Gallas brought about the visitors' third just before the break. Fàbregas scored two goals in the second half and substitute Eduardo added Arsenal's sixth, before Saha scored for Everton in stoppage time. The game marked Vermaelen's league debut and the player was described by The Guardian's match correspondent Andy Hunter as "comfortably the finest defender on display", having limited his counterpart Marouane Fellaini to so few chances while "anticipating danger expertly". The following week Abou Diaby scored two goals as Arsenal beat Portsmouth 4–1. Arsenal then travelled to play the incumbent champions Manchester United at Old Trafford. Arshavin's goal in the 40th minute gave Arsenal the lead, but Manuel Almunia conceded a penalty in the second half, as he adjusted to have fouled striker Wayne Rooney in the penalty box. Rooney converted the spot kick to level the scoreline, before Diaby headed the ball into his own net from a United free-kick. Late on, Wenger was sent to the stands for kicking a water bottle after Van Persie's equaliser was correctly disallowed. He felt the defeat was an "undeserved" one, going further to criticise his opponents' tactics: "I have seen a player make 20 fouls without getting a yellow card. If you have seen the game, you don't need me to tell you who but their player gets away without a yellow card. It's quite amazing."

Arsenal did not play another game for a fortnight because of the international football break. On the resumption of club football, they faced Manchester City. At the City of Manchester Stadium, Arsenal lost for the second league match in succession, this time by a two-goal margin. Adebayor scored against his former club and caused controversy by running towards the Arsenal section and celebrating in front of them. Television replays also caught the striker attempting to stamp Van Persie's face. At home, Arsenal responded with a 4–0 win against Wigan Athletic and a single Van Persie's goal was enough to beat Fulham away in the team's final match of September. Vito Mannone's performance at Craven Cottage was praised; he stood in for the injured Almunia. After six games, Arsenal garnered 12 points and stood in fifth position, having played a game less than each of the teams occupying the top four.

The visit of Blackburn Rovers to the Emirates Stadium in early October coincided with the start of Wenger's 13th year at the club. Six different players (Vermaelen, Van Persie, Arshavin, Fàbregas, Theo Walcott and Nicklas Bendtner) scored in the team's 6–2 win. Arsenal defeated Birmingham City 3–1 at home before conceding twice away to West Ham United on 25 October 2009 to draw. Arsenal's final game of October was a North London derby against Tottenham Hotspur. Van Persie scored the opening goal in the 42nd minute, before Fàbregas added a second immediately – he won the ball straight from the kick-off and went past Tottenham's static defence, before shooting past Heurelho Gomes. Van Persie scored Arsenal's third in the second half and the 3–0 win moved Arsenal into third position, five points behind Chelsea in first who played a game more.

=== November–January ===
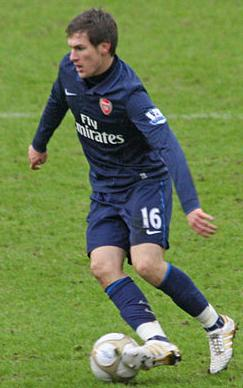
Aaron Ramsey made his breakthrough into the first eleven for Arsenal during the 2009–10 season.

Arsenal's first fixture of November was against Wolverhampton Wanderers at the Molineux Stadium. The team moved into second place as a result of a 4–1 win. Wenger was sceptical of whether his team could reach a century of goals in the league, but was overjoyed at Arsenal's goal tally of 36 in 11 league matches: "[It] shows that the way we play football, the way we are organised and the way we go forward suits our players." Following the international football break, Arsenal played Sunderland at the Stadium of Light. Eduardo deputised for Van Persie, who injured himself whilst playing for the Netherlands. Darren Bent's goal in the 71st minute won the match for Sunderland, who became the first team to prevent Arsenal from scoring in a league match. Manchester United's defeat of Everton moved Arsenal down into third position in the league table, three points ahead. At home to league leaders Chelsea on 29 November 2009, Arsenal lost 3–0; striker Didier Drogba scored two goals in either interval of the game. When asked if Arsenal's title chances were over, Wenger replied, "It is not over and I believe, on what I have seen of Chelsea, that the team can drop points."

December saw Arsenal win five out of six league matches. Arshavin and Aaron Ramsey each scored against Stoke City at home, and the team came from behind to beat Liverpool at Anfield – a ground where they were winless in five years. The victory was attributed to Wenger's half-time team talk where he uncharacteristically shouted at his players and told them they were "not fit to wear the shirt" after a poor first-half performance. "Of course it can always go the other way and you can lose 6–1. Then it's a crisis; it is like that." he told reporters. Arsenal were then held to a 1–1 draw at Burnley which meant they remained in third spot, with the gap between themselves and Chelsea ever increasing. The team returned to winning ways at home to Hull City as Denílson, Eduardo and Diaby got on the scoresheet in a 3–0 victory. A day after Boxing Day, Arsenal beat Aston Villa by the same scoreline; Fàbregas came off the substitutes' bench and scored twice. The Arsenal captain however injured himself in the closing stages of the match and was ruled out for their next game, away to Portsmouth. Nevertheless, the team recorded a 4–1 victory to move four points behind leaders Chelsea with a game in hand.

Tomáš Rosický scored in stoppage time to deny Everton their first win at Arsenal in 14 years. The match, which saw the visitors lead twice, was played in cold conditions as a result of the "Big Freeze". Arsenal then faced Bolton Wanderers back-to-back; the home fixture was originally called off on 6 January 2010 due to heavy snow. At the Reebok Stadium, goals from Fàbregas and Fran Mérida saw the visitors to victory in what was Owen Coyle's first game in charge of Bolton. In the reverse fixture three days later Arsenal won again to go back in first spot, this time coming back from two goals down to win 4–2. Their stay at the top of the table was brief and moved back down to third, after they were held to a goalless stalemate against Aston Villa in the midweek round, while Chelsea beat Birmingham. Arsenal's best chances in the match came in the first half; Fàbregas and Rosicky both had efforts hit the post and crossbar respectively.

The end of January brought the visit of Manchester United to the Emirates Stadium. Wenger described the game as an opportunity for Arsenal to prove they were "mentally prepared" to compete in the title race, but his team were outclassed by the visitors which prompted boos from the home support at the final whistle. Nani opened the scoring just after the half-hour mark and was involved in the counter-attack that led to the second goal four minutes later, finished off by Rooney. Park Ji-sung added a third for United in the second half, before Vermaelen scored late on to make the scoreline 3–1. The defeat left Arsenal still in third with 14 games remaining, five points behind leaders Chelsea.

=== February–May ===
Arsenal's poor form against the title challengers continued: at Stamford Bridge they were unable to get the better of a Chelsea side that powered into a 2–0 lead in the first half-hour. Drogba opened the scoring in the eighth minute when John Terry headed the ball across the face of goal and he tapped in at the far post. The striker scored his second of the game from a counter-attack. In his match report for The Guardian, Kevin McCarra opined that Arsenal were "strangled by stereotype" and a second successive defeat put end to their title bid. Wenger downplayed the defeat, and told reporters "we didn't get a demonstration of football but they were efficient;" his comments on possession irked Chelsea midfielder Michael Ballack. Arsenal returned to winning ways in midweek with a narrow victory against Liverpool and then scored twice to beat Sunderland. At the Britannia Stadium, Arsenal forged a comeback against Stoke City but their win was overshadowed by the injury to Ramsey. The midfielder broke his right leg following a challenge by Stoke defender Ryan Shawcross, who was immediately sent off. Wenger described the tackle as "horrendous" and added "People say we don't fancy the physical side of it, but this is the result. If you see a player getting injured like that, it's not acceptable."

A win against Burnley in March put Arsenal level on points with second-place Chelsea having played a game more. The team needed a late goal against Hull City, courtesy of Bendtner in the third minute of stoppage time to get three points and move above Manchester United into second place. Wenger was defiant his team could win the title after Arsenal beat West Ham to move top; it was their sixth consecutive league win and victory was ensured when Fàbregas converted a penalty late on. They were without Vermaelen for the trip to St Andrew's as the defender was sent off against West Ham. Arsenal were unable to hold on to their lead against Birmingham as Almunia's error gifted a stoppage-time equaliser, scored by Kevin Phillips. With six games remaining, Arsenal stood in third place, three points behind Chelsea and four on leaders Manchester United.

At home against Wolverhampton Wanderers, Bendtner scored the winning goal in stoppage time, rising highest inside the six-yard box and heading in Sagna's cross. In the North London derby, Tottenham beat Arsenal at White Hart Lane to record their first league win against Wenger's side since November 1999. Danny Rose on his debut opened the scoring with a 30-yard volley and Gareth Bale doubled the host's lead minutes into the second half. Bendtner scored with five minutes remaining of normal time but the game ended 2–1 to Tottenham, leaving Arsenal six points adrift of Chelsea at the top.

Wenger was so incensed by Arsenal's response against Wigan – conceding three in the final 10 minutes to throw away a 2–0 lead – that he ordered the team bus to drop his players at Wigan railway station and told them to make their way back home. With Arsenal's title bid over, the team played out a goalless draw against Manchester City and then lost to Blackburn Rovers in early May. Arsenal secured third place on the final day, beating Fulham at home by four goals.

=== Matches ===
15 August 2009 1	Everton	1–6	Arsenal	Liverpool
17:30 BST	Saha 90'	Report	26' Denílson; 37' Vermaelen; 41' Gallas; 48', 70' Fàbregas; 89' Eduardo	Stadium: Goodison Park; Attendance: 39,309; Referee: Mark Halsey

22 August 2009 2	Arsenal	4–1	Portsmouth	London
15:00 BST	Diaby 18', 22' (yellow card) 90'; Gallas 51'; Ramsey 69'	Report	37' Kaboul	Stadium: Emirates Stadium; Attendance: 60,049; Referee: Steve Bennett

29 August 2009 3	Manchester United	2–1	Arsenal	Manchester
17:15 BST	(yellow card) 35' Evra; 59' (pen.) (yellow card) 62' Rooney; (yellow card) 62' Brown; 64' (o.g.) Diaby	Report	(yellow card) 23' Song; (yellow card) 32' Gallas; 40' Arshavin; (yellow card) 45' Van Persie; (yellow card) 58' Almunia; (yellow card) 71' Eboué; (yellow card) 75' Sagna	Stadium: Old Trafford; Attendance: 75,095; Referee: Mike Dean

12 September 2009 4	Manchester City	4–2	Arsenal	Manchester
15:00 BST	(yellow card) 14' Lescott; 20' (o.g.) Almunia; 72' Bellamy; 80' (yellow card) 81' Adebayor; 84' Wright-Phillips; (yellow card) 90+3' de Jong	Report	(yellow card) 19' Sagna; 63' Van Persie; (yellow card) 72' Song; 88' Rosický	Stadium: City of Manchester Stadium; Attendance: 47,339; Referee: Mark Clattenburg

19 September 2009 5	Arsenal	4–0	Wigan Athletic	London
15:00 BST	25', 49' Vermaelen; 59' (yellow card) 23' Eboué; 90' Fàbregas; (yellow card) 40' Song	Report	(yellow card) 53' Gómez; (yellow card) 65' Scharner	Stadium: Emirates Stadium; Attendance: 59,103; Referee: Mike Jones

26 September 2009 6	Fulham	0–1	Arsenal	London
17:30 BST	(yellow card) 26' Murphy; (yellow card) 45' Zamora; (yellow card) 70' Pantsil; (yellow card) 79' Konchesky	Report	52' Van Persie	Stadium: Craven Cottage; Attendance: 25,700; Referee: Martin Atkinson

4 October 2009 7	Arsenal	6–2	Blackburn Rovers	London
13:30 BST	17' Vermaelen; 33' (yellow card) 45' Van Persie; 37' Arshavin; 57' Fàbregas; 75' Walcott; 89' Bendtner	Report	4' Nzonzi; 30' Dunn; (yellow card) 11' Di Santo	Stadium: Emirates Stadium; Attendance: 59,431; Referee: Peter Walton

17 October 2009 8	Arsenal	3–1	Birmingham City	London
15:00 BST	16' Van Persie; 18' Diaby; 84' Arshavin; (yellow card) 73' Song	Report	38' Bowyer; (yellow card) 58' Hart; (yellow card) 63' Ridgewell	Stadium: Emirates Stadium; Attendance: 60,082; Referee: Lee Probert

25 October 2009 9	West Ham United	2–2	Arsenal	London
16:15 GMT	74' Cole; 80' (pen.) Diamanti; (yellow card) 78' (yellow-red card) 85' Parker; (yellow card) 71' Hines; (yellow card) 78' Collison	Report	16' Van Persie; 37' Gallas; (yellow card) 77' Eboué; (yellow card) 80' Mannone	Stadium: Boleyn Ground; Attendance: 34,442; Referee: Chris Foy

31 October 2009 10	Arsenal	3–0	Tottenham Hotspur	London
12:45 GMT	42', 60' Van Persie; 43' Fàbregas; (yellow card) 78' Vermaelen	Report	(yellow card) 62' Crouch	Stadium: Emirates Stadium; Attendance: 60,103; Referee: Mark Clattenburg

7 November 2009 11	Wolverhampton Wanderers	1–4	Arsenal	Wolverhampton
17:30 GMT	89' Craddock; (yellow card) 27' Ebanks-Blake; (yellow card) 60' Milijaš	Report	28' (o.g.) Zubar; 36' (o.g.) Craddock; 45' Fàbregas; 66' (yellow card) 40' Arshavin; (yellow card) 10' Gallas; (yellow card) 59' Gibbs	Stadium: Molineux Stadium; Attendance: 28,937; Referee: Steve Bennett

21 November 2009 12	Sunderland	1–0	Arsenal	Sunderland
15:00 GMT	71' Bent; (yellow card) 84' Bardsley; (yellow card) 90' Richardson	Report	(yellow card) 90' Traoré	Stadium: Stadium of Light; Attendance: 44,918; Referee: Alan Wiley

29 November 2009 13	Arsenal	0–3	Chelsea	London
16:00 GMT	(yellow card) 26' Traoré; (yellow card) 90+5' Fàbregas	Report	41', 86' (yellow card) 37' Drogba; 45' (o.g.) Vermaelen; (yellow card) 70' Mikel	Stadium: Emirates Stadium; Attendance: 60,067; Referee: Andre Marriner

5 December 2009 14	Arsenal	2–0	Stoke City	London
15:00 GMT	26' Arshavin; 79' Ramsey; (penalty missed) 20' Fàbregas	Report		Stadium: Emirates Stadium; Attendance: 60,041; Referee: Mark Clattenburg

13 December 2009 15	Liverpool	1–2	Arsenal	Liverpool
16:00 GMT	41' Kuyt; (yellow card) 44' Aurélio; (yellow card) 55' Mascherano; (yellow card) 85' Lucas	Report	50' (o.g.) Johnson; 58' (yellow card) 81' Arshavin; (yellow card) 24' Denílson; (yellow card) 82' Fàbregas	Stadium: Anfield; Attendance: 43,853; Referee: Howard Webb

16 December 2009 16	Burnley	1–1	Arsenal	Lancashire
19:45 GMT	28' (pen.) Alexander; (yellow card) 40' Eagles; (yellow card) 88' Caldwell	Report	7' Fàbregas	Stadium: Turf Moor; Attendance: 21,309; Referee: Mike Dean

19 December 2009 17	Arsenal	3–0	Hull City	London
17:30 GMT	45+4' Denílson; 59' Eduardo; 80' Diaby; (yellow card) 45' Nasri	Report	(yellow card) 45' Barmby; (yellow card) 45' Hunt; (yellow card) 45+2' Zayatte; (yellow card) 45+5' Boateng; (yellow card) 90+3' Olofinjana	Stadium: Emirates Stadium; Attendance: 60,006; Referee: Steve Bennett

27 December 2009 18	Arsenal	3–0	Aston Villa	London
13:30 GMT	65', 81' Fàbregas; 90+1' Diaby; (yellow card) 67' Song	Report	(yellow card) 55' A. Young; (yellow card) 76' Cuéllar; (yellow card) 90+4' Delph	Stadium: Emirates Stadium; Attendance: 60,056; Referee: Phil Dowd

30 December 2009 19	Portsmouth	1–4	Arsenal	Portsmouth
19:45 GMT	74' Belhadj; (yellow card) 45+2' Mokoena; (yellow card) 86' Hughes	Report	28' (o.g.) Kaboul; 42' Nasri; 69' Ramsey; 81' Song	Stadium: Fratton Park; Attendance: 20,404; Referee: Alan Wiley

9 January 2010 20	Arsenal	2–2	Everton	London
15:00 GMT	28' (o.g.) Osman; 90+2' Rosický; (yellow card) 87' Sagna	Report	12' Osman; 81' (yellow card) 90+1' Pienaar	Stadium: Emirates Stadium; Attendance: 60,053; Referee: Peter Walton

17 January 2010 21	Bolton Wanderers	0–2	Arsenal	Bolton
16:00 GMT	(yellow card) 35' Robinson	Report	28' Fàbregas; 78' Mérida; (yellow card) 37' Rosický; (yellow card) 77' Vermaelen	Stadium: Reebok Stadium; Attendance: 23,893; Referee: Phil Dowd

20 January 2010 22	Arsenal	4–2	Bolton Wanderers	London
19:45 GMT	43' Rosický; 52' Fàbregas; 65' Vermaelen; 85' Arshavin; (yellow card) 87' Clichy	Report	7' Cahill; 28' (pen.) Taylor; (yellow card) 47' Muamba; (yellow card) 68' McCann	Stadium: Emirates Stadium; Attendance: 59,084; Referee: Alan Wiley

27 January 2010 23	Aston Villa	0–0	Arsenal	Birmingham
19:45 GMT	(yellow card) 55' Heskey; (yellow card) 90+3' Dunne	Report	(yellow card) 13' Vermaelen; (yellow card) 84' Clichy	Stadium: Villa Park; Attendance: 39,601; Referee: Lee Probert

31 January 2010 24	Arsenal	1–3	Manchester United	London
16:00 GMT	80' Vermaelen; (yellow card) 17' Song	Report	33' (o.g.) Almunia; 37' Rooney; 52' Park	Stadium: Emirates Stadium; Attendance: 60,091; Referee: Chris Foy

7 February 2010 25	Chelsea	2–0	Arsenal	London
16:00 GMT	8', 23' Drogba; (yellow card) 88' Zhirkov; (yellow card) 88' J. Cole	Report	(yellow card) 83' Song; (yellow card) 84' Fàbregas	Stadium: Stamford Bridge; Attendance: 41,794; Referee: Mike Dean

10 February 2010 26	Arsenal	1–0	Liverpool	London
19:45 GMT	72' Diaby; (yellow card) 40' Clichy; (yellow card) 64' Bendtner; (yellow card) 90+5' Fàbregas	Report	(yellow card) 41' Rodríguez; (yellow card) 62' Degen	Stadium: Emirates Stadium; Attendance: 60,045; Referee: Howard Webb

20 February 2010 27	Arsenal	2–0	Sunderland	London
15:00 GMT	27' Bendtner; 90+3' (pen.) Fàbregas; (yellow card) 50' Fàbregas	Report	(yellow card) 34' Cana; (yellow card) 44' Turner; (yellow card) 58' Richardson; (yellow card) 71' Mensah; (yellow card) 90+2' Ferdinand	Stadium: Emirates Stadium; Attendance: 60,083; Referee: Steve Bennett

27 February 2010 28	Stoke City	1–3	Arsenal	Stoke-on-Trent
17:30 GMT	8' Pugh; (red card) 66' Shawcross	Report	32' Bendtner; 90+1' (pen.) Fàbregas; 90+4' Vermaelen; (yellow card) 62' Song	Stadium: Britannia Stadium; Attendance: 27,011; Referee: Peter Walton

6 March 2010 29	Arsenal	3–1	Burnley	London
15:00 GMT	34' Fàbregas; 60' Walcott; 90+4' Arshavin	Report	50' Nugent; (yellow card) 27' McDonald; (yellow card) 48' Paterson; (yellow card) 69' Carlisle; (yellow card) 72' Elliott	Stadium: Emirates Stadium; Attendance: 60,043; Referee: Chris Foy

13 March 2010 30	Hull City	1–2	Arsenal	Kingston upon Hull
17:30 GMT	28' (pen.) Bullard; (yellow card) 39' Dawson; (yellow card) 41' (yellow-red card) 45+1'Boateng	Report	14' Arshavin; 90+3' (yellow card) 40' Bendtner; (yellow card) 28' Campbell	Stadium: KC Stadium; Attendance: 25,023; Referee: Andre Marriner

20 March 2010 31	Arsenal	2–0	West Ham United	London
17:30 GMT	5' Denílson; 83' (pen.) Fàbregas; (red card) 44' Vermaelen; (yellow card) 39' Campbell	Report	(yellow card) 38' (penalty missed) 44' Diamanti; (yellow card) 45+1' Kováč; (yellow card) 62' Upson; (yellow card) 90+1' Daprelà	Stadium: Emirates Stadium; Attendance: 60,077; Referee: Martin Atkinson

27 March 2010 32	Birmingham City	1–1	Arsenal	Birmingham
15:00 GMT	90+2' Phillips; (yellow card) 73' Ferguson; (yellow card) 85' Gardner; (yellow card) 89' Carr	Report	81' Nasri; (yellow card) 16' Song; (yellow card) 25' Clichy	Stadium: St Andrew's; Attendance: 27,039; Referee: Howard Webb

3 April 2010 33	Arsenal	1–0	Wolverhampton Wanderers	London
15:00 BST	90+4' Bendtner	Report	(red card) 66' Henry; (yellow card) 64' Jarvis; (yellow card) 79' Mancienne	Stadium: Emirates Stadium; Attendance: 60,067; Referee: Andre Marriner

14 April 2010 34	Tottenham Hotspur	2–1	Arsenal	London
20:00 BST	10' Rose; 47' Bale; (yellow card) 33' Modrić; (yellow card) 36' Kaboul; (yellow card) 83' Dawson	Report	85' Bendtner; (yellow card) 36' Denílson	Stadium: White Hart Lane; Attendance: 36,041; Referee: Mark Clattenburg

18 April 2010 35	Wigan Athletic	3–2	Arsenal	Wigan
13:30 BST	80' Watson; 89', (yellow card) 68' Bramble; 90+1' N'Zogbia; (yellow card) 24' Diamé	Report	41' Walcott; 48' Silvestre; (yellow card) 37' Nasri	Stadium: DW Stadium; Attendance: 22,113; Referee: Lee Mason

24 April 2010 36	Arsenal	0–0	Manchester City	London
17:30 BST	(yellow card) 42' Silvestre; (yellow card) 51' Diaby; (yellow card) 67' Song; (yellow card) 82' Van Persie	Report	(yellow card) 81' Bellamy; (yellow card) 83' Zabaleta	Stadium: Emirates Stadium; Attendance: 60,086; Referee: Mike Dean

3 May 2010 37	Blackburn Rovers	2–1	Arsenal	Blackburn
17:00 BST	Grella (yellow card) 25'; Dunn 44'; Pedersen (yellow card) 59'; Samba 68'	Report	13' Van Persie; (yellow card) 65' Silvestre; (yellow card) 90' Campbell	Stadium: Ewood Park; Attendance: 26,138; Referee: Martin Atkinson

9 May 2010 38	Arsenal	4–0	Fulham	London
16:00 BST	Arshavin 21'; Van Persie 26'; Baird 37' (o.g.); Eboué (yellow card) 68'; Fabiański (yellow card) 69'; Vela 84'	Report	(yellow card) 65' Dempsey; (yellow card) 90+3' Kelly	Stadium: Emirates Stadium; Attendance: 60,039; Referee: Mike Jones

=== Classification ===
Pos	Team	Pld	W	D	L	GF	GA	GD	Pts	Qualification or relegation
1	Chelsea (C)	38	27	5	6	103	32	+71	86	Qualification for the Champions League group stage
2	Manchester United	38	27	4	7	86	28	+58	85	Qualification for the Champions League group stage
3	Arsenal	38	23	6	9	83	41	+42	75	Qualification for the Champions League group stage
4	Tottenham Hotspur	38	21	7	10	67	41	+26	70	Qualification for the Champions League play-off round
5	Manchester City	38	18	13	7	73	45	+28	67	Qualification for the Europa League play-off round (Note: Since Manchester United won the League Cup and then qualified for the Champions League, their spot in the Europa League was passed down to the 6th-placed team. The 6th-placed Aston Villa was coincidentally also the League Cup runners-up.)

Source: Barclays Premier League
(C) Champions

==== Results summary ====
Overall								Home						Away					
Pld	W	D	L	GF	GA	GD	Pts	W	D	L	GF	GA	GD	W	D	L	GF	GA	GD
38	23	6	9	83	41	+42	75	15	2	2	48	15	+33	8	4	7	35	26	+9

==== Results by round ====
Round	1	2	3	4	5	6	7	8	9	10	11	12	13	14	15	16	17	18	19	20	21	22	23	24	25	26	27	28	29	30	31	32	33	34	35	36	37	38
Ground	A	H	A	A	H	A	H	H	A	H	A	A	H	H	A	A	H	H	A	H	A	H	A	H	A	H	H	A	H	A	H	A	H	A	A	H	A	H
Result	W	W	L	L	W	W	W	W	D	W	W	L	L	W	W	D	W	W	W	D	W	W	D	L	L	W	W	W	W	W	W	D	W	L	L	D	L	W
Position	1	1	5	8	6	5	4	4	3	3	2	3	4	3	3	3	3	3	3	3	3	2	3	3	3	3	3	3	3	3	2	3	3	3	3	3	3	3

A = Away; H = Home; W = Win; D = Draw; L = Loss

== FA Cup ==
Arsenal entered the FA Cup in the third round (last 64), in which they were drawn to face fellow Premier League club West Ham United away from home. They came from a goal down to beat their London rivals and progress, but made an exit the following round against Stoke where an understrength side were undone in the final 20 minutes. Wenger defended his team selection, pointing out to the media: "We had 10 injuries and a very difficult programme coming up."

3 January 2010 Third round	West Ham United	1–2	Arsenal	London
16:15 GMT	Diamanti 45+1'; Daprelà (yellow card) 45'	Report	78' Ramsey; 83' Eduardo; (yellow card) 27' Song	Stadium: Boleyn Ground; Attendance: 25,549; Referee: Mark Clattenburg

24 January 2010 Fourth round	Stoke City	3–1	Arsenal	Stoke-on-Trent
13:30 GMT	Fuller 2', 78'; Whitehead 86'	Report	42' Denílson	Stadium: Britannia Stadium; Attendance: 19,735; Referee: Martin Atkinson

== Football League Cup ==
Arsenal entered the Football League Cup in the third round, where they were drawn at home against West Bromwich Albion. Helped by the dismissal of Jerome Thomas, Arsenal's young team – averaging at 20 years – were able to beat the visitors by two goals to progress. A strong performance against Liverpool followed in the competition, but Arsenal were knocked out in the quarter-final stage when Manchester City defeated them by three goals.

22 September 2009 Third round	Arsenal	2–0	West Bromwich Albion	London
19:45 BST	Watt 68'; Vela 76'; Senderos (yellow card) 32'; Ramsey (yellow card) 57'	Report	(red card) 37' Thomas; (yellow card) 38' Cox	Stadium: Emirates Stadium; Attendance: 56,592; Referee: Lee Mason

28 October 2009 Fourth round	Arsenal	2–1	Liverpool	London
19:45 GMT	Mérida 19'; Bendtner 50'	Report	26' Insúa	Stadium: Emirates Stadium; Attendance: 60,004; Referee: Alan Wiley

2 December 2009 Fifth round	Manchester City	3–0	Arsenal	Manchester
19:45 GMT	Tevez 50'; Wright-Phillips 69'; Weiss 89'; Kompany (yellow card) 82'; Bellamy (yellow card) 83'	Report	(yellow card) 38' Traoré; (yellow card) 39' Eastmond; (yellow card) 58' Silvestre; (yellow card) 77' Wilshere; (yellow card) 79' Song; (yellow card) 82' Ramsey	Stadium: City of Manchester Stadium; Attendance: 46,015; Referee: Chris Foy

== UEFA Champions League ==
Given Arsenal finished fourth in the league the previous season, the club played a qualifying round against Celtic to ensure progression into the group stages. In the first leg at Celtic Park, Arsenal broke the deadlock when Fábregas' free-kick deflected in off defender William Gallas and past the goal net. Gary Caldwell's own goal deep into the second half strengthened Arsenal's advantage on a night when their midfielder Alex Song was described by journalist David Hytner as being "...outstanding, his strength, smart positioning and interceptions helping to stem Celtic raids and launch those of his own team."

Arsenal beat Celtic 3–1 in the return leg a week later; it was not without controversy as the Celtic players accused Eduardo of diving to win his team a penalty that led to the first goal. UEFA charged the striker and banned him for two matches as he was found guilty of deceiving referee Manuel Gonzalez. Arsenal lodged an appeal and the ban was overturned at a later date.

=== Play-off round ===
18 August 2009 First leg	Celtic (Scotland)	0–2	(England) Arsenal	Glasgow, Scotland
19:45 BST	(yellow card) 52' Fox; (yellow card) 58' N'Guemo; (yellow card) 86' Loovens	Report	43' Gallas; 71' (o.g.) Caldwell; (yellow card) 84' Clichy	Stadium: Celtic Park; Attendance: 58,165; Referee: Massimo Busacca (Switzerland)

26 August 2009 Second leg	Arsenal (England)	3–1 (5–1 agg.)	(Scotland) Celtic	London, England
19:45 BST	28' (pen.) Eduardo; 53', (yellow card) 53' Eboué; 74' Arshavin; (yellow card) 83' Denílson	Report	90+2' Donati; (yellow card) 33' Caldwell; (yellow card) 56' McGeady; (yellow card) 83' Brown	Stadium: Emirates Stadium; Attendance: 59,962; Referee: Manuel Mejuto González (Spain)

=== Group stage ===
Arsenal were drawn in Group H, along with Greek club Olympiacos, Belgian side Standard Liège and Dutch champions AZ Alkmaar. The team mounted a comeback against Standard Liège on the first night of the competition, having conceded twice in the space of the first five minutes. Eduardo's deciding goal, which came nine minutes before the end marked the fifth season in the previous six that Arsenal opened their campaign with a win. Late goals from Van Persie and Arshavin secured a 2–0 win at home to Olympiacos, but the team were unable to make it three wins after conceding a stoppage-time goal to draw 1–1 against AZ. In the reverse match, staged on matchday four, Fábregas scored twice in Arsenal's 4–1 win which put the club on 10 points in the group. Victory against Standard Liège ensured qualification into the knockout stages with a match to spare. That game was against Olympiacos, which Wenger made changes to his first XI. Arsenal lost 1–0 at the Karaiskakis Stadium.

Pos	Team	Pld	W	D	L	GF	GA	GD	Pts	Qualification
1	(England) Arsenal	6	4	1	1	12	5	+7	13	Advance to knockout phase
2	(Greece) Olympiacos	6	3	1	2	4	5	−1	10	Advance to knockout phase
3	(Belgium) Standard Liège	6	1	2	3	7	9	−2	5	Transfer to Europa League
4	(Netherlands) AZ	6	0	4	2	4	8	−4	4	

Source: RSSSF

16 September 2009 1	Standard Liège (Belgium)	2–3	(England) Arsenal	Liège, Belgium
20:45 CEST	Mangala 3'; Jovanović 5' (pen.); Witsel (yellow card) 68'; Nicaise (yellow card) 76'	Report	Clichy (yellow card) 34'; Bendtner 45'; Vermaelen 78'; Eduardo 81'	Stadium: Stade Maurice Dufrasne; Attendance: 23,022; Referee: Eduardo Iturralde González (Spain)

29 September 2009 2	Arsenal (England)	2–0	(Greece) Olympiacos	London, England
19:45 BST	Van Persie (yellow card) 52', (goal) 78'; Arshavin 86'; Fàbregas (yellow card) 90'	Report	Żewłakow (yellow card) 52'; Dudu (yellow card) 66'; Torosidis (yellow card) 80'; Bravo (yellow card) 89'	Stadium: Emirates Stadium; Attendance: 59,884; Referee: Stéphane Lannoy (France)

20 October 2009 3	AZ (Netherlands)	1–1	(England) Arsenal	Alkmaar, Netherlands
20:45 CEST	Mendes da Silva 90+3'; Lens (yellow card) 89'	Report	Fàbregas 36'; Van Persie (yellow card) 48'; Clichy (yellow card) 66'; Vela (yellow card) 77'	Stadium: DSB Stadion; Attendance: 16,666; Referee: Martin Hansson (Sweden)

4 November 2009 4	Arsenal (England)	4–1	(Netherlands) AZ	London, England
19:45 GMT	Fàbregas 25', 52'; Nasri 43'; Diaby 72'	Report	Moisander (yellow card) 66'; Lens 82'	Stadium: Emirates Stadium; Attendance: 59,345; Referee: Alain Hamer (Luxembourg)

24 November 2009 5	Arsenal (England)	2–0	(Belgium) Standard Liège	London, England
19:45 GMT	Nasri 35'; Denílson 45+2'; Fàbregas (yellow card) 87'	Report	Mulemo (yellow card) 68'; Mangala (yellow card) 70'; Carcela (red card) 86'	Stadium: Emirates Stadium; Attendance: 59,941; Referee: Konrad Plautz (Austria)

9 December 2009 6	Olympiacos (Greece)	1–0	(England) Arsenal	Piraeus, Greece
21:45 EET	Leonardo (yellow card) 24', (goal) 47'	Report	Mérida (yellow card) 40'	Stadium: Karaiskakis Stadium; Attendance: 30,277; Referee: Lucílio Batista (Portugal)

=== Knockout phase ===
==== Round of 16 ====
Arsenal faced Porto in the knockout stages. In the first leg at the Estádio do Dragão, an own goal by goalkeeper Łukasz Fabiański gave Porto the lead, but Campbell scored Arsenal a crucial away goal seven minutes later when he headed in a corner. Radamel Falcao restored Porto's lead in the second half and the tie finished 2–1 in their favour. At the Emirates Stadium, Arsenal overturned Porto's slender advantage as Bendtner scored twice inside the first 25 minutes. Nasri and Emmanuel Eboué added further goals before Bendtner converted a penalty to round off a hat-trick.

17 February 2010 First leg	Porto (Portugal)	2–1	(England) Arsenal	Porto, Portugal
19:45 WET	Fabiański 11' (o.g.); Falcao 51'; Alves (yellow card) 34'; Fucile (yellow card) 64'; Pereira (yellow card) 78'; Fernando (yellow card) 84'	Report	Campbell 18'; Diaby (yellow card) 31'	Stadium: Estádio do Dragão; Attendance: 40,717; Referee: Martin Hansson (Sweden)

9 March 2010 Second leg	Arsenal (England)	5–0 (6–2 agg.)	(Portugal) Porto	London, England
19:45 GMT	Bendtner 10', 25', 90+1' (pen.), (yellow card) 44'; Nasri 63'; Eboué 66'; Vermaelen (yellow card) 38'	Report	Falcao (yellow card) 24'; Pereira (yellow card) 59'	Stadium: Emirates Stadium; Attendance: 59,661; Referee: Frank De Bleeckere (Belgium)

==== Quarter-finals ====
In the quarter-finals, Arsenal played Barcelona which marked the return of former club captain Thierry Henry. Barcelona dominated proceedings but did not find a way through the Arsenal defence until the early stages of the second half; Zlatan Ibrahimovic took advantage of Almunia leaving his box and rushing towards him by lofting the ball over the goalkeeper. Ibrahimovic doubled Barcelona's lead, to which Wenger responded by bringing Walcott on. The forward made an instant impact with his pace and acceleration, scoring past Victor Valdes. Barcelona defender Carles Puyol was sent off for a second bookable offence when he fouled Fábregas in the box, and the Arsenal captain converted the penalty awarded by the referee to equalise.

Walcott, who Barcelona manager Pep Guardiola described as Arsenal's biggest threat, was named in the first XI for the return leg and set Bendtner up to score. The joy was short lived as Messi equalised within minutes and he added a further three goals to give Barcelona a 6–3 aggregate win – 4–1 on the night. Wenger was full of praise for Messi afterwards, telling reporters: "...We lost against a team that is better than us and that has the best player in the world. Once he's on the run, Messi is unstoppable. He's the only player who can change direction at such a pace."

31 March 2010 First leg	Arsenal (England)	2–2	(Spain) Barcelona	London, England
19:45 BST	Walcott 69'; Fàbregas 85' (pen.) (yellow card) 44'; Arshavin (yellow card) 21'; Song (yellow card) 40'; Eboué (yellow card) 74'; Diaby (yellow card) 79'	Report	Ibrahimović 46', 59'; Puyol (red card) 84'; Piqué (yellow card) 72'	Stadium: Emirates Stadium; Attendance: 59,572; Referee: Massimo Busacca (Switzerland)

6 April 2010 Second leg	Barcelona (Spain)	4–1 (6–3 agg.)	(England) Arsenal	Barcelona, Spain
20:45 CEST	Messi 21', 37', 42', 88'	Report	Bendtner 18'; Denílson (yellow card) 31'; Rosický (yellow card) 45'; Eboué (yellow card) 67'	Stadium: Camp Nou; Attendance: 93,330; Referee: Wolfgang Stark (Germany)

== Squad statistics ==
Arsenal used a total of 41 players during the 2009–10 season and there were 20 different goalscorers. There were also four squad members who did not make a first-team appearance in the campaign. This was the first season the team played in a 4–3–3 formation, utilised for the benefit of Fàbregas. Sagna featured in 44 matches – the most of any Arsenal player in the campaign. Vermaelen started in 33 league matches.

The team scored a total of 115 goals in all competitions. The highest scorer was Fàbregas, with 19 goals, 15 of which scored in the league. Vermaelen was the only Arsenal player to be sent off in the entire season. The side's continuing sportsmanship was acknowledged at the end of the season with the Barclays Fair Play Award.

Key

No. = Squad number

Pos = Playing position

Nat. = Nationality

Apps = Appearances

GK = Goalkeeper

DF = Defender

MF = Midfielder

FW = Forward

= Yellow cards

= Red cards

Numbers in parentheses denote appearances as substitute. Players with number struck through and marked † left the club during the playing season.

No.	Pos.	Nat.	Name	Premier League		FA Cup		League Cup		Europe		Total		Discipline	
No.	Pos.	Nat.	Name	Apps	Goals	Apps	Goals	Apps	Goals	Apps	Goals	Apps	Goals	A yellow rectangular card	A red rectangular card
1	GK	ESP	Manuel Almunia	29	0	0	0	0	0	7	0	36	0	1	0
2	MF	FRA	Abou Diaby	26 (3)	6	(1)	0	0	0	9 (1)	1	35 (5)	7	4	0
3	DF	FRA	Bacary Sagna	31 (4)	0	1	0	0	0	7 (1)	0	39 (5)	0	3	0
4	MF	ESP	Cesc Fàbregas	26 (1)	15	1	0	0	0	8	4	35 (1)	19	8	0
5	DF	BEL	Thomas Vermaelen	33	7	1	0	0	0	11	1	45	8	4	1
~~6~~	DF	SUI	Philippe Senderos †	0	0	0	0	2	0	0	0	2	0	1	0
7	MF	CZE	Tomáš Rosický	14 (11)	3	0	0	1	0	5 (2)	0	20 (13)	3	2	0
8	MF	FRA	Samir Nasri	22 (4)	2	(1)	0	1	0	6	3	29 (5)	5	2	0
9	FW	CRO	Eduardo	13 (11)	2	1 (1)	1	1	0	2 (3)	2	17 (15)	5	0	0
10	DF	FRA	William Gallas	26	3	1	1	0	0	8	1	35	4	2	0
11	FW	NED	Robin van Persie	14 (2)	9	0	0	0	0	4	1	18 (2)	10	5	0
12	FW	MEX	Carlos Vela	1 (10)	1	2	0	1 (1)	1	2 (3)	0	6 (14)	2	1	0
14	MF	ENG	Theo Walcott	12 (11)	3	1	0	0	0	2 (4)	1	15 (15)	4	0	0
15	MF	BRA	Denílson	19 (1)	3	1	1	0	0	5 (2)	1	25 (3)	5	3	0
16	MF	WAL	Aaron Ramsey	7 (11)	3	1 (1)	1	3	0	1 (5)	0	12 (17)	4	2	0
17	MF	CMR	Alex Song	25 (1)	1	1	0	1	0	10	0	37 (1)	1	13	0
18	DF	FRA	Mikaël Silvestre	9 (3)	1	2	0	3	0	2 (1)	0	16 (4)	1	3	0
~~19~~	MF	ENG	Jack Wilshere †	(1)	0	1	0	2	0	1 (2)	0	4 (3)	0	1	0
20	DF	SUI	Johan Djourou	(1)	0	0	0	0	0	0	0	(1)	0	0	0
21	GK	POL	Łukasz Fabiański	4	0	2	0	2	0	2	0	10	0	1	0
22	DF	FRA	Gaël Clichy	23 (1)	0	0	0	0	0	9	0	32 (1)	0	6	0
23	MF	RUS	Andrey Arshavin	25 (5)	10	(1)	0	0	0	7 (1)	2	32 (7)	12	3	0
24	GK	ITA	Vito Mannone	5	0	0	0	0	0	3	0	8	0	1	0
27	DF	CIV	Emmanuel Eboué	17 (8)	1	0	0	1	0	6 (4)	2	24 (12)	3	6	0
28	DF	ENG	Kieran Gibbs	3	0	0	0	2	0	2	0	7	0	1	0
30	DF	FRA	Armand Traoré	9	0	1	0	2	0	0	0	12	0	3	0
31	DF	ENG	Sol Campbell	10 (1)	0	1	0	0	0	2	1	13 (1)	1	3	0
32	MF	ESP	Fran Mérida	(4)	1	1	0	2	1	1	0	4 (4)	2	1	0
33	MF	NED	Nacer Barazite	0	0	0	0	(1)	0	0	0	(1)	0	0	0
~~34~~	MF	ENG	Kyle Bartley †	0	0	0	0	0	0	1	0	1	0	0	0
35	MF	FRA	Francis Coquelin	0	0	1	0	1 (1)	0	0	0	2 (1)	0	0	0
36	DF	ENG	Thomas Cruise	0	0	0	0	0	0	1	0	1	0	0	0
37	DF	ENG	Craig Eastmond	2 (2)	0	1	0	2	0	0	0	5 (2)	0	1	0
~~38~~	MF	ENG	Jay Emmanuel-Thomas †	0	0	1	0	0	0	0	0	1	0	0	0
~~42~~	DF	ENG	Kerrea Gilbert †	0	0	0	0	2	0	1	0	3	0	0	0
~~45~~	MF	ENG	Henri Lansbury †	(1)	0	0	0	0	0	0	0	(1)	0	0	0
~~48~~	MF	ENG	Mark Randall †	0	0	0	0	(2)	0	0	0	(2)	0	0	0
~~51~~	FW	FRA	Gilles Sunu †	0	0	0	0	1	0	(1)	0	1 (1)	0	0	0
52	FW	DEN	Nicklas Bendtner	13 (10)	6	0	0	1	1	7	5	21 (10)	12	3	0
~~53~~	GK	POL	Wojciech Szczęsny †	0	0	0	0	1	0	0	0	1	0	0	0
~~54~~	MF	ENG	Sanchez Watt †	0	0	0	0	1 (2)	1	0	0	1 (2)	1	0	0

== See also ==
- 2009–10 in English football
- List of Arsenal F.C. seasons
