= Vito Mannone =

Italian footballer (born 1988)

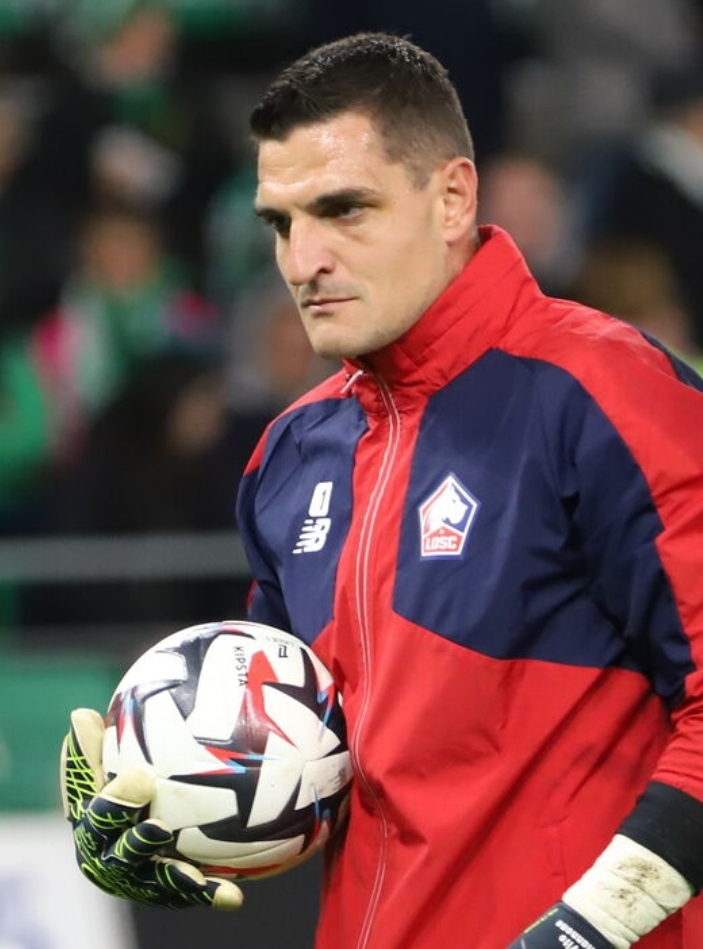
- Mannone with Lille in 2024

Personal information
- Full name: Vito Mannone
- Date of birth: 2 March 1988 (age 38)
- Place of birth: Desio, Italy
- Height: 1.89 m (6 ft 2 in)
- Position: Goalkeeper

Team information
- Current team: Crawley Town
- Number: 1

Youth career
- 2003–2005: Atalanta
- 2005–2006: Arsenal

Senior career*
Years	Team	Apps	(Gls)
2006–2013	Arsenal	15	(0)
2006	→ Barnsley (loan)	2	(0)
2010–2011	→ Hull City (loan)	10	(0)
2012	→ Hull City (loan)	21	(0)
2013–2017	Sunderland	67	(0)
2017–2020	Reading	47	(0)
2019	→ Minnesota United (loan)	34	(0)
2020	→ Esbjerg fB (loan)	12	(0)
2020–2022	Monaco	9	(0)
2022–2023	Lorient	18	(0)
2023–2025	Lille	2	(0)
2024	Lille II	1	(0)
2026–	Crawley Town	6	(0)

International career^{‡}
2009–2010	Italy U21	7	(0)
- * Club domestic league appearances and goals as of 23:44, 23 August 2026 (UTC) ‡ National team caps and goals as of 17:10, 10 June 2026 (UTC)

Vito Mannone (born 2 March 1988) is an Italian professional football player and coach who plays as a goalkeeper for EFL League Two club Crawley Town, where he also serves as head of goalkeeping.

Born in Desio, Mannone was a member of Atalanta's academy before moving to England in 2005, joining Arsenal. He made his Arsenal debut in 2009 and made eight appearances in 2009–10 before spending two loan spells with Hull City. He left Arsenal in 2013 for Sunderland. In his first season, he won the club's Player of the Year award as Sunderland reached the League Cup final. He spent four seasons with Sunderland before moving to Reading in 2017. Mannone moved on loan to Minnesota United and Esbjerg before leaving permanently in 2020. Mannone moved to France, playing for Monaco and Lorient. He joined Lille in 2023.

He has also represented Italy at U21 level.

== Early career ==
Born in Desio, Lombardy, from Sicilian parents, Mannone was signed by Arsène Wenger during the summer of 2005, joining Arsenal from Atalanta on a three-year deal for a £350,000 compensation fee. He made his Arsenal debut in a pre-season friendly against Barnet on 16 July 2005, as Arsenal ran out 4–1 winners.

== Club career ==
=== Arsenal ===
==== Early career ====
On 18 August 2006, Mannone was sent out on a three-month loan to Championship club Barnsley, where he was expected to challenge Nick Colgan for the number-one spot. He made his debut in the League Cup against Blackpool on 22 August 2006. After a 2–2 draw, the game went to a penalty shootout in which Mannone saved a penalty from Keigan Parker to help his team through to the next round. However Mannone's time at Barnsley was ultimately not a happy one. Making his league debut in an away game to Preston North End on 22 September, he came on as a substitute after Colgan was sent off. He punched a cross onto Patrick Agyemang's head and the ball bounced in for the winning goal to Preston. In his next match, starting in place of the suspended Colgan, against Luton Town, he dropped a cross late on and Ahmet Brković scored the winner.

After suffering a knee injury, Mannone's loan period was cut short and he returned to Arsenal on 23 October 2006 for treatment.

He was linked with a loan move to then newly promoted Scottish Premier League side Gretna in the summer of 2007, but that move fell through.

Mannone was understudy to Łukasz Fabiański during Arsenal's 2007–08 League Cup campaign. However, he was an unused substitute in all of the club's five matches in the competition, before they were knocked-out in the semi-finals by North London rivals Tottenham Hotspur. On 19 December 2007, Arsenal announced that Mannone had signed a new long-term contract. On 19 April 2008, he was named on the bench for a Premier League game for the first time, in Arsenal's 2–0 win against Reading at the Emirates Stadium. But he was an unused substitute as Jens Lehmann played the entire match.

==== 2008–2012 ====
Following the departure of Jens Lehmann in the summer of 2008, Mannone became Arsenal's third-choice goalkeeper, behind Manuel Almunia and Łukasz Fabiański. Mannone changed his shirt number from 40 to 24 at the beginning of the 2008–09 season, after Manuel Almunia (the previous owner) was given the number 1. On 19 July 2008, he was brought on for the second half of Arsenal's 2–1 pre-season friendly win over Barnet at Underhill, keeping a clean sheet. He made a total of four pre-season appearances for Arsenal's first team in the summer of 2008, coming on as a half-time substitute in all of them.

He finally made his competitive debut for Arsenal's first team in their final match of the 2008–09 season, a Premier League fixture at home to Stoke City on 24 May 2009. Arsenal won the game 4–1.

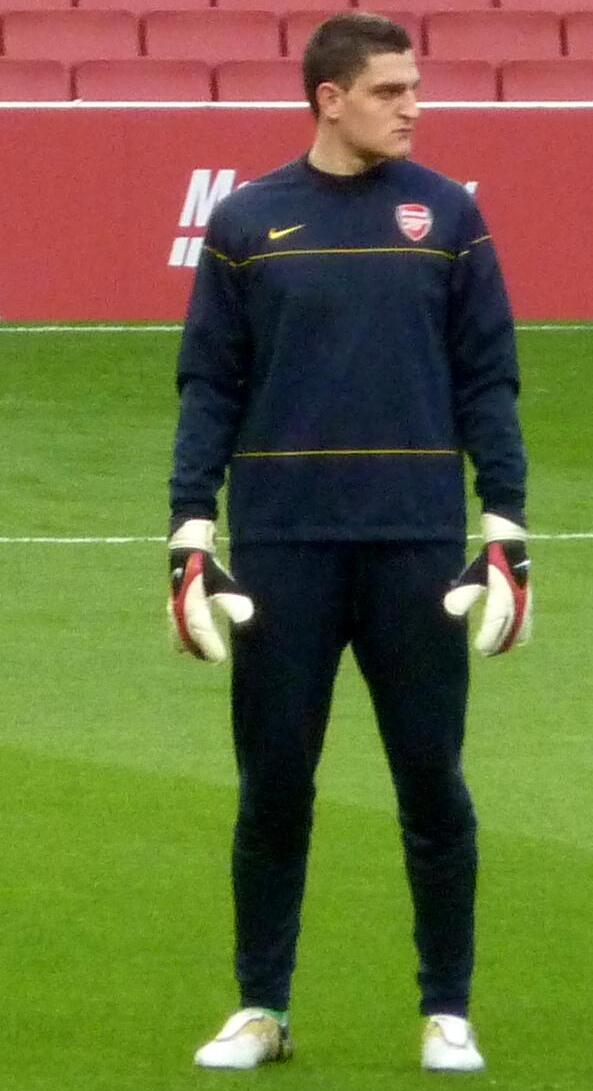
Mannone with Arsenal

With first choice goalkeeper Manuel Almunia and back-up Łukasz Fabiański out injured, Mannone made his first UEFA Champions League start against Standard Liège, in Arsenal's first group stage match on 16 September 2009. Mannone's night got off to a poor start, conceding twice within the first five minutes: first from a shot from outside of the box by Eliaquim Mangala which beat Mannone at the near post and then a penalty converted by Milan Jovanović after he was brought down by William Gallas. However, Arsenal recovered to win the match 3–2, after goals from Nicklas Bendtner, Thomas Vermaelen and Eduardo.

Mannone made his second Premier League appearance against Wigan Athletic on 19 September 2009. He kept a clean sheet in a 4–0 victory for Arsenal. Mannone also kept a clean sheet in a 1–0 win against Fulham at Craven Cottage on 26 September 2009, in which he pulled off many good saves and almost single-handedly kept Arsenal in the game. Mannone said the game was the highlight of his career. He again kept a clean sheet in the 2–0 victory over Olympiacos in the UEFA Champions League on 29 September 2009. On 17 October 2009, Mannone was selected as the starting keeper over the previous mainstay, Almunia, who had been overlooked after missing through illness; this was seen as a vote of confidence for Mannone after people had previously questioned his and Almunia's future in the first team.

On 25 January 2010, Mannone signed a new long-term contract with Arsenal, setting his sight to become Arsenal's first choice goalkeeper.

On 18 October 2010, Mannone joined Championship side Hull City on loan until 3 January 2011. On 27 October 2010, Mannone played his first game with Hull City against Scunthorpe United in a reserve match in which Hull won 3–0. Mannone was reported to have made a few great saves. He made his first team debut on 13 November 2010 against Preston North End, where he kept a clean sheet in a 2–0 victory. He also kept another clean sheet against Ipswich Town on his home debut in which the game ended in a 1–0 victory for Hull. He had a good spell with Hull, keeping 4 clean sheets in 7 games and also saved a penalty against Reading. On 31 December 2010, he returned to Arsenal after a thigh injury, but rejoined Hull on loan until the end of the season. He returned from injury on 5 March 2011, in a 1–0 win over Nottingham Forest at the City Ground.

Mannone returned to Arsenal as third choice behind the two Polish keepers, Wojciech Szczęsny and Łukasz Fabiański. His first competitive appearance of the 2011–12 season came on 6 December 2011 against Olympiacos in the UEFA Champions League, replacing the injured Lukasz Fabiański. Mannone made a blunder that allowed David Fuster to score Olympiacos' second goal of the night and Arsenal eventually lost the game 3–1.

==== Later career ====
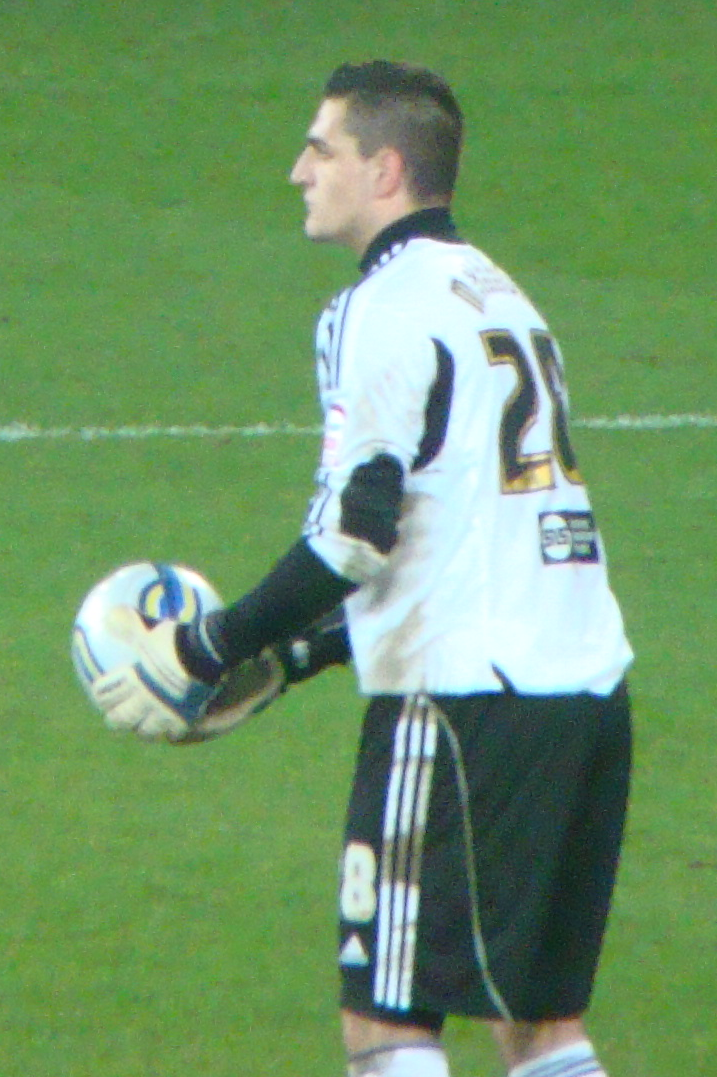
Mannone playing for Hull City in 2012

Mannone returned to Hull City on 4 January 2012, signing on loan until the end of the season. His first game back at the KC Stadium was an FA Cup third round match against Ipswich Town, with Hull City winning 3–1. His first league game was a 1–0 away win over Reading. He then played in the FA Cup fourth round match against Crawley Town which ended in a surprise 1–0 defeat for Hull, during which he was announced as Man of the Match. He then kept a clean sheet over Doncaster in a goalless draw at the KC Stadium on 31 January.

Due to injuries to both Wojciech Szczęsny and Łukasz Fabiański, Mannone was the first choice goalkeeper, playing the full 90 minutes in a 0–0 draw against Stoke City, and keeping another clean sheet a week later against Liverpool at Anfield. Mannone also played in a 1–1 draw against Manchester City on 23 September. Due to his performances this season Mannone stated he was ready to challenge Szczęsny for the number one spot. He effectively succeeded Fabiański for the number two spot.

In March, with Szczęsny rested for a few matches and Mannone injured, Fabiański filled in. Fabiański's performances got him promoted to reserve, pushing Mannone down to third choice.

=== Sunderland ===
==== 2013–2015 ====
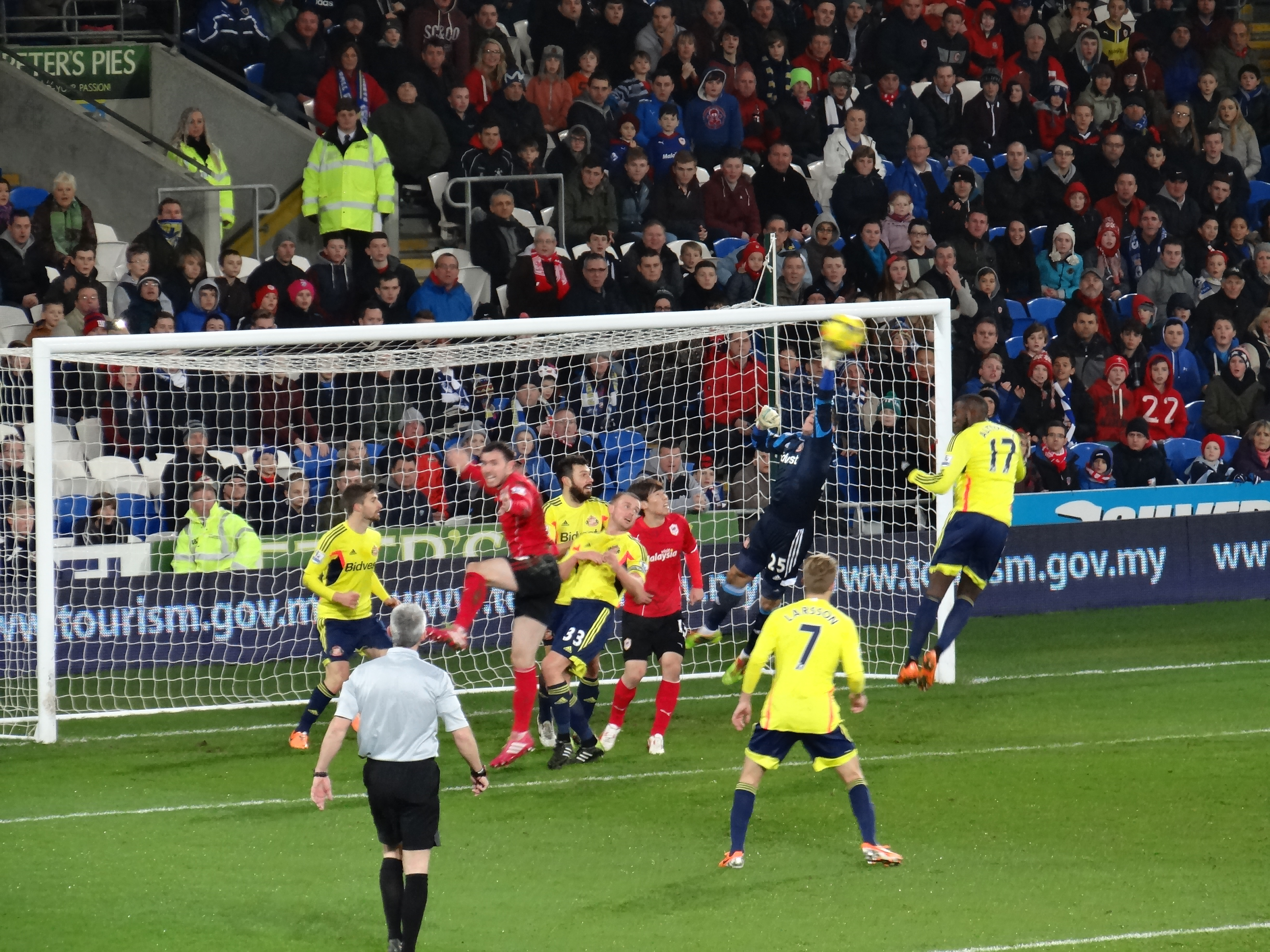
Mannone punching clear a corner during Sunderland's 2–2 draw at Cardiff in December 2013

On 3 July 2013, Mannone signed a two-year contract with Sunderland, for an undisclosed fee. Mannone started both of Sunderland's matches in the Premier League Asia Trophy in pre-season, but Keiren Westwood was preferred to him for the opening league game of the season against Fulham. After featuring in the League Cup, Mannone made his league debut for the Black Cats in a 1–0 loss at Hull, replacing the injured Westwood. Mannone retained his place for a 2–1 cup win over Southampton, and made his first league start in a 1–0 home win over Manchester City.

In the second leg of the semi-final tie against Manchester United in the League Cup, Mannone saved two penalties in the penalty shoot out at the end of the extra time that helped Sunderland qualify for the final at Wembley against Manchester City.

On 22 April 2014, Mannone was named the Sunderland Supporters' Player of the Year at a special presentation night at the Stadium of Light. On 29 May 2014, he was named the club's Player of the Year.

Mannone began the 2014–15 season as first choice, but after a series of poor performances culminating in an 8–0 loss at Southampton and a 2–0 home defeat at Arsenal the following week he was dropped in favour of Costel Pantilimon. Pantilimon remained first choice for the rest of the season, with Mannone only featuring in cup games and in a 3–1 defeat at Chelsea on the final day.

==== 2015–2017 ====
On 26 December 2015, Mannone started ahead of Pantilimon in a 4–1 defeat at Manchester City. He retained his place in the following match, a 1–0 home defeat to Liverpool, and was praised by manager Sam Allardyce after the game. After Pantilimon was transferred to Watford in January 2016, Mannone remained first choice over Jordan Pickford for the rest of the season, as Sunderland fought an ultimately successful battle against relegation, with their safety eventually being confirmed with a 3–0 home victory over Everton on 11 May 2016.

On 4 July 2016, Mannone signed a new two-year contract with Sunderland.

=== Reading ===
On 19 July 2017, Mannone moved to Reading for a fee of around £2 million. signing a three-year contract.

On 10 February 2019, Mannone joined Major League Soccer side Minnesota United on a one-year loan. On 24 October 2019, Mannone was named MLS Goalkeeper of the Year.

On 31 January 2020, Mannone was loaned out to Danish Superliga club Esbjerg fB for the rest of the season.

=== Monaco ===
On 11 September 2020, Mannone signed for Ligue 1 side Monaco on a two-year contract.

=== Lorient ===
On 2 September 2022, Mannone joined Ligue 1 club Lorient on a one-year contract. During his only season with Les Merlus, he collected five clean sheets in 20 appearances.

=== Lille ===
On 29 August 2023, Mannone joined Ligue 1 side Lille on a permanent deal as a back-up goalkeeper behind Lucas Chevalier, signing a two-year contract. In January 2025, Mannone saved two penalties at Stade Velodrome during Coupe de France Round of 32 game against OM.

=== Crawley Town ===
On 10 June 2026, Mannone joined EFL League Two side Crawley Town as a player-coach.

== International career ==
On 13 November 2009, Mannone made his debut with the Italy U-21 team in a match against Hungary. He played seven matches in 2011 UEFA European Under-21 Football Championship qualification.

== Personal life ==
On 14 June 2015, Mannone married his girlfriend Fiorella.

== Career statistics ==
=== Club ===
As of match played 15 August 2026

Appearances and goals by club, season and competition
Club	Season	League			National cup (Note: Includes FA Cup, U.S. Open Cup, Danish Cup, Coupe de France)		League cup (Note: Includes Football League Cup)		Continental		Other		Total	
Club	Season	Division	Apps	Goals	Apps	Goals	Apps	Goals	Apps	Goals	Apps	Goals	Apps	Goals
Arsenal	2006–07	Premier League	0	0	0	0	0	0	0	0	—		0	0
Arsenal	2007–08	Premier League	0	0	0	0	0	0	0	0	—		0	0
Arsenal	2008–09	Premier League	1	0	0	0	0	0	0	0	—		1	0
Arsenal	2009–10	Premier League	5	0	0	0	0	0	3 (Note: Appearances in Champions League)	0	—		8	0
Arsenal	2010–11	Premier League	0	0	0	0	0	0	0	0	—		0	0
Arsenal	2011–12	Premier League	0	0	0	0	0	0	1	0	—		1	0
Arsenal	2012–13	Premier League	9	0	0	0	0	0	4	0	—		13	0
Arsenal	Total		15	0	0	0	0	0	8	0	—		23	0
Barnsley (loan)	2006–07	Championship	2	0	0	0	2	0	—		—		4	0
Hull City (loan)	2010–11	Championship	10	0	0	0	0	0	—		—		10	0
Hull City (loan)	2011–12	Championship	21	0	2	0	0	0	—		—		23	0
Sunderland	2013–14	Premier League	29	0	1	0	6	0	—		—		36	0
Sunderland	2014–15	Premier League	10	0	3	0	0	0	—		—		13	0
Sunderland	2015–16	Premier League	19	0	0	0	1	0	—		—		20	0
Sunderland	2016–17	Premier League	9	0	2	0	0	0	—		2 (Note: Appearances in EFL Trophy with Sunderland's U23 side)	0	11	0
Sunderland	Total		67	0	6	0	7	0	—		2	0	80	0
Reading	2017–18	Championship	41	0	0	0	0	0	—		—		41	0
Reading	2018–19	Championship	6	0	0	0	0	0	—		—		6	0
Reading	Total		47	0	0	0	0	0	—		—		47	0
Minnesota United (loan)	2019	Major League Soccer	34	0	5	0	—		—		1 (Note: Appearance in MLS Cup Playoffs)	0	40	0
Esbjerg fB (loan)	2019–20	Danish Superliga	12	0	1	0	—		—		—		13	0
Monaco	2020–21	Ligue 1	9	0	0	0	—		—		—		9	0
Monaco	2021–22	Ligue 1	0	0	2	0	—		0	0	—		2	0
Monaco	Total		9	0	2	0	—		0	0	—		11	0
Lorient	2022–23	Ligue 1	18	0	2	0	—		—		—		20	0
Lille	2023–24	Ligue 1	2	0	1	0	—		3 (Note: Appearances in UEFA Conference League)	0	—		6	0
Lille	2024–25	Ligue 1	0	0	2	0	—		0	0	—		2	0
Lille	Total		2	0	3	0	—		3	0	—		8	0
Crawley Town	2026–27	League Two	6	0	0	0	2	0	—		2	0	10	0
Career total			243	0	21	0	11	0	11	0	4	0	291	!0

== Honours ==
Sunderland

- Football League Cup runner-up: 2013–14

Individual

- Sunderland Supporters' Player of the Year: 2013–14
- Sunderland Player of the Year: 2013–14
- MLS Goalkeeper of the Year: 2019
- MLS Best XI: 2019
