= Gustavo Siviero =

Argentine footballer and manager

Personal information
- Full name: Gustavo Lionel Siviero
- Date of birth: 13 September 1969 (age 57)
- Place of birth: Laguna Paiva, Argentina
- Height: 1.82 m (6 ft 0 in)
- Position: Centre-back

Team information
- Current team: Mallorca B (manager)

Senior career*
Years	Team	Apps	(Gls)
1988–1991	Colón Santa Fe	106	(4)
1991–1992	América Cali		
1992–1993	San Lorenzo	27	(1)
1994–1996	Newell's Old Boys	82	(3)
1996–1998	Lanús	72	(8)
1998–2002	Mallorca	92	(1)
2002–2004	Albacete	43	(0)
2005	Colón Santa Fe	15	(0)
Total		437	(17)

Managerial career
- 2010–2012: Atlético Baleares
- 2012–2013: Murcia
- 2013: Salamanca
- 2015: Atlético Baleares
- 2016–2017: Lleida Esportiu
- 2017: Hércules
- 2019–2020: Enosis Neon
- 2020–2023: Intercity
- 2023–: Mallorca B
- * Club domestic league appearances and goals

Gustavo Lionel Siviero (born 13 September 1969) is an Argentine former professional footballer who played as a central defender. He is the manager of Segunda Federación club Mallorca B.

He made 98 La Liga appearances, mainly for Mallorca but also Albacete. He began coaching in 2010, mainly in the Spanish lower levels.

== Club career ==
Born in Laguna Paiva, Santa Fe Province, Siviero began playing professionally with Club Atlético Colón, moving in 1991 to Colombia with América de Cali. After only one season, he returned to his country and joined San Lorenzo de Almagro.

Siviero then spent two seasons apiece with Newell's Old Boys and Club Atlético Lanús, always in the Primera División. In summer 1998, he signed with La Liga club RCD Mallorca alongside Lanús teammate Ariel Ibagaza (another Argentine, goalkeeper Carlos Roa, had done the same move the previous campaign); possessing an Italian passport, he did not count as a non-European Union player. In his first year, acting as replacement for Real Madrid-bound Iván Campo, he was an undisputed starter as the Balearic Islands side narrowly missed on UEFA Champions League group-stage entry; his official debut came in the first leg of the Supercopa de España, a 2–1 away win against FC Barcelona (eventual 2–2 aggregate victory on the away goals rule).

In July 2002, aged 33, Siviero moved to Albacete Balompié also in Spain, reuniting with Roa, with the pair being instrumental as the Castilla–La Mancha team returned to the top division in their debut season after a seven-year absence. After totalling only games in his last two years – suffering relegation in 2005 – he returned to his first professional club Colón, retiring shortly after.

== International career ==
In 1999, Siviero was summoned by Argentina national team manager Marcelo Bielsa for a friendly with the Netherlands in Amsterdam. He did not make his debut there, however, and was never selected again.

== Coaching career ==
Siviero started coaching in Mallorca's youth academy. In October 2010 he replaced his former teammate Goran Milojević (1992–95) at the helm of Segunda División B club CD Atlético Baleares, also in Mallorca. His team won their group in 2011–12, but were eliminated from the playoff semi-finals by CD Lugo.

In July 2012, Siviero was appointed at Real Murcia CF on a one-year contract after turning down a new deal at Baleares. He was dismissed the following February with the team 16th in the Segunda División, far off their target of the play-offs.

Siviero was back in the third division and Atlético Baleares in January 2015, on a contract that would extend itself by a year should they avoid the drop. He achieved this, but he and his staff were axed unexpectedly in November due to conflicts with the board.

In 2016–17, Siviero managed Lleida Esportiu. Following a poor start to the season that saw them in a relegation place, he took the Catalans to eighth place, enough for a Copa del Rey berth but not for the playoffs; his deal was not renewed.

Siviero joined Hércules CF of the third tier in July 2017, for one year. He was shown the door on 15 October after nine matches, split equally between wins, draws and losses.

On 30 September 2019, after nearly two years out of the game, Siviero returned to the dugout with last-placed Enosis Neon Paralimni FC of the Cypriot First Division, his first job outside of Spain. He left the following January and was close to a return to Hércules weeks later, which abruptly collapsed due to a vote of confidence in caretaker manager Antonio Moreno.

Remaining in the Province of Alicante, Siviero signed for Tercera División club CF Intercity on 28 December 2020, for the rest of the season. The side won promotion to the new Segunda División RFEF with a 1–0 playoff final win over Elche Ilicitano. After winning promotion as group winners in the 2021–22 season, his contract was renewed.

Siviero's Intercity reached the last 32 of the national cup in 2022–23, losing 4–3 at home to Barcelona after extra time. He was dismissed on 17 April with the team one point above the relegation zone with six games remaining; his final result was a 2–2 home draw with rivals CF La Nucía after conceding twice in the final six minutes.

Siviero returned to Mallorca on 16 June 2023, being appointed at their reserves in the Tercera Federación. He achieved promotion at the end of his debut campaign.

== Managerial statistics ==
As of match played 28 February 2026

Managerial record by team and tenure
Team	Nat	From	To	Record								Ref
Team	Nat	From	To	G	W	D	L	GF	GA	GD	Win %	Ref
Atlético Baleares	(Spain)	4 October 2010	19 June 2012	75	31	26	18	105	73	+32	41.33	
Murcia	(Spain)	5 July 2012	5 February 2013	25	7	6	12	26	35	−9	28.00	
Salamanca	(Spain)	5 August 2013	27 August 2013	0	0	0	0	0	0	+0	—	
Atlético Baleares	(Spain)	21 January 2015	25 November 2015	33	14	9	10	45	35	+10	42.42	
Lleida Esportiu	(Spain)	14 July 2016	16 May 2017	41	16	11	14	43	45	−2	39.02	
Hércules	(Spain)	6 July 2017	15 October 2017	11	4	3	4	14	12	+2	36.36	
Enosis Neon	(Cyprus)	30 September 2019	20 January 2020	14	3	5	6	17	29	−12	21.43	
Intercity	(Spain)	28 December 2020	17 April 2023	89	38	32	19	113	68	+45	42.70	
Mallorca B	(Spain)	16 June 2023	Present	98	49	17	32	170	95	+75	50.00	
Career Total				386	162	109	115	533	392	+141	41.97	—

== Honours ==
Mallorca

- Supercopa de España: 1998
