= Manuel Almunia =

Spanish footballer (born 1977)

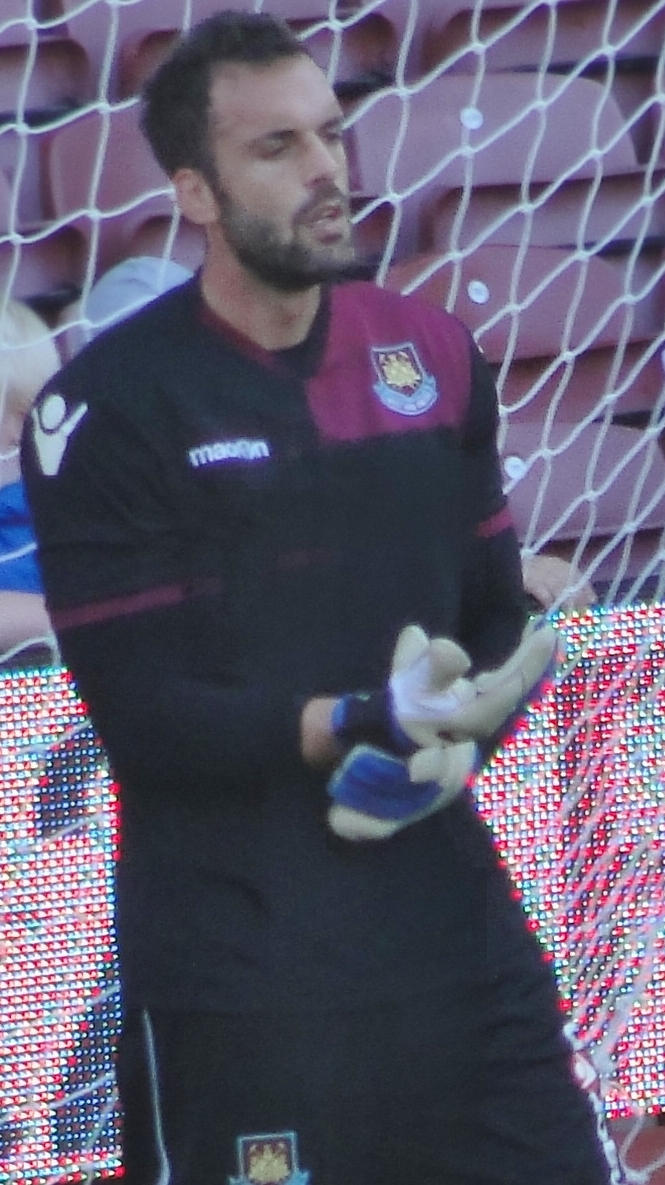
- Almunia with West Ham United in 2011

Personal information
- Full name: Manuel Almunia Rivero
- Date of birth: 19 May 1977 (age 49)
- Place of birth: Pamplona, Spain
- Height: 1.93 m (6 ft 4 in)
- Position: Goalkeeper

Youth career
- Oberena

Senior career*
Years	Team	Apps	(Gls)
1995–1999	Osasuna B	46	(0)
1999–2000	Osasuna	0	(0)
1999–2000	→ Cartagonova (loan)	3	(0)
2000–2001	Sabadell	29	(0)
2001–2004	Celta	0	(0)
2001–2002	→ Eibar (loan)	35	(0)
2002–2003	→ Recreativo (loan)	2	(0)
2003–2004	→ Albacete (loan)	24	(0)
2004–2012	Arsenal	109	(0)
2011	→ West Ham United (loan)	4	(0)
2012–2014	Watford	76	(0)
Total		328	(0)
- * Club domestic league appearances and goals

Manuel Almunia Rivero (born 19 May 1977) is a Spanish former professional footballer who played as a goalkeeper.

He competed mainly in the Spanish lower leagues in his early years, only appearing in 26 La Liga games over two seasons with Recreativo and Albacete after starting out at Osasuna. Most of his career was spent with Arsenal, for whom he signed in 2004, going on to play 175 official matches and winning the 2005 FA Cup. He also had a short loan spell at West Ham United, joining Watford in 2012 and retiring two years later.

== Club career ==
=== Early career ===
Born in Pamplona, Navarre, Almunia started his senior career with CA Osasuna's reserves in 1995, going on to spend four seasons with the team in the Segunda División B. Subsequently, he stayed in the same level, where he represented FC Cartagonova and CE Sabadell FC.

In the summer of 2001, Almunia first reached La Liga, after signing with RC Celta de Vigo. He never represented the club officially, however, being loaned to SD Eibar (where he won the Ricardo Zamora Trophy in the Segunda División for the 2001–02 campaign), Recreativo de Huelva and Albacete Balompié, the last two in the top flight.

Playing understudy to José Antonio Luque and César at Recre, Almunia's debut in the Spanish top tier came on 17 November 2002, following a red card to the latter in a 3–0 away loss against Deportivo Alavés. It was one of only two league appearances during the season, as the Andalusians suffered relegation after ranking 18th.

At Albacete Balompié, Almunia started as backup to Carlos Roa. However, after the Argentine came down with illness he became first-choice, going on to help his team easily escape relegation through a 14th-place finish; his first league appearance was on 9 November 2003, in a 1–0 home defeat to Málaga CF as Roa was suspended.

=== Arsenal ===
Almunia joined Arsenal on 14 July 2004 for an undisclosed sum, to provide backup to Jens Lehmann. He made his debut for his new team on 27 October in a 2–1 win at Manchester City in that season's League Cup, and his maiden Premier League appearance came on 4 December against Birmingham City; the highlight of his first year came in the fifth round of the FA Cup, a replay at Sheffield United: with the game finishing 0–0 after extra time and heading to penalties, he saved Alan Quinn and Jon Harley's attempts to book his team a place in the quarter-finals, and was an unused substitute in the final win over Manchester United.

In the 2005–06 campaign, Almunia continued as second-choice to Lehmann, but found himself thrust into the spotlight when he replaced Robert Pires in the 20th minute of the final of the UEFA Champions League against FC Barcelona after Lehmann was sent off. He performed well for the most part, only conceding both goals in the 2–1 loss late in the game.

2006–07 brought Almunia 14 appearances in all competitions. This included the League Cup final, lost to Chelsea. He and Lehmann were by all accounts rivals off the pitch as well. In an interview with German television in October 2007, speaking about manager Arsène Wenger's decision to drop him in favour of the Spaniard, Lehmann said: "It's possible that some day I'll feel like talking about the whole issue. But at the moment I'm just swallowing it all as part of the humiliation. But I think – and this is aimed at my dear manager – one shouldn't humiliate players for too long. I won't just fade away quietly. Almunia has not yet showed he can win matches for us. I've experienced this before and know what the others are expecting from the goalkeeper". Five months later, Almunia responded: "I treat people the way I would like to be treated myself. To have someone here who hates me is just amazing. Every morning I wake up I know it is going to be the same. But I don't care any more. I come into training and work with Łukasz Fabiański and Vito Mannone. They are better than him anyway".

Almunia finally won the battle for first-choice duties in the 2007–08 season. Highlights included saving a penalty from Robbie Keane to help Arsenal beat Tottenham Hotspur 2–1. He was given the number one shirt after Lehmann left for VfB Stuttgart at the beginning of the 2008–09 campaign, and he saved another important penalty on 21 March 2009, this time from Newcastle United's Obafemi Martins in a 3–1 victory. In June 2008 he signed a new four-year contract with the English club, but his subsequent performances were highly inconsistent, with brilliant displays in the Champions League semi-final first leg against Manchester United and the 2010 Champions League quarter-finals against Barcelona, and poorly received ones which resulted in rumours arising that he would be sold.

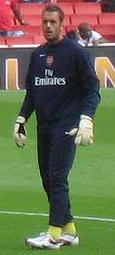
Almunia warming up for Arsenal in 2006

Despite the speculation, Almunia began 2010–11 as starter. However, on 25 September against West Bromwich Albion, he conceded a penalty (which he saved), let a weak shot slip through the near post and was caught out of position in the opposition's third goal; he lost his place through injury and, upon his return, found himself third-choice behind the Polish duo of Fabiański and Wojciech Szczęsny.

Almunia made a return to the team on 30 January 2011 against Huddersfield Town in the FA Cup, and went on to play both games in the next round against Leyton Orient. On 8 March, he came on as a 19th-minute substitute for the injured Szczęsny against Barcelona in the Champions League last-16 stage, and made a series of saves as Arsenal lost 3–1 at the Camp Nou to exit the tournament, 4–3 on aggregate; he was voted Player of the match by fans on the club's official website.

With Szczęsny (dislocated finger), Fabianski (shoulder) and Mannone all out with injury, Almunia again became first-choice. On 19 March, during a 2–2 draw at West Bromwich, he was caught out of position along with Sébastien Squillaci, gifting the home team their second goal; already with Lehmann back in the club as an emergency signing, he injured his knee during warm-up of the fixture against Blackpool, and did not appear in any more matches for the rest of the season.

On 30 September 2011, Almunia signed an initial one-month emergency loan deal with Championship club West Ham United after Robert Green was ruled out for six weeks with a knee cartilage injury. He made his debut for the Hammers on 1 October in a 2–2 away draw against Crystal Palace but, at the end of October and with Green's return to fitness, he returned to Arsenal.

On 22 May 2012, Arsenal announced that Almunia and six other players would be released from their contracts as of 30 June.

=== Watford ===
In July 2012, aged 35, Almunia signed a one-year contract with Championship's Watford, replacing Scott Loach who had moved to Ipswich Town. He played his first game on 11 August in a League Cup tie at home to Wycombe Wanderers, and kept a clean sheet.

Having appeared in all thirty four of Watford's league games, Almunia injured his hamstring against Derby County on 23 February 2013. He missed the next six contests as youngster Jonathan Bond deputised in his absence, returning in a 0–0 home draw against Cardiff City on 6 April 2013.

On 12 May 2013, in the play-off semi-final second leg at home to Leicester City, Almunia made a double save from Anthony Knockaert's penalty in injury time, with Watford leading 2–1 but still level on aggregate. Watford counter-attacked from the resulting saves and Troy Deeney scored to put his team in the decisive match against Crystal Palace, where a Kevin Phillips penalty in extra time resulted in a 1–0 loss.

Watford announced that Almunia had signed a new twelve-month deal on 5 July 2013, to keep him at the club for one further season. Manager Gianfranco Zola commented: "His experience and influence are so important for us and the impact he had at Watford last season was magnificent." He left in June of the following year, as his contract expired.

Almunia retired on 28 August 2014 on medical advice, after a rare heart condition was picked up during a medical with Serie A side Cagliari Calcio. In 2016, he was appointed to the role of goalkeeping coach at UAE Pro League club Al Jazira Club.

== International career ==
Almunia did not represent Spain at any level. He stated on more than one occasion his desire to play for England, only provided that he did not receive a call-up from his nation of birth first.

== Personal life ==
Almunia, whose brother served in the United Nations Peacekeeping Operations in Kosovo, has an interest in the Second World War and regularly visited sites associated with the conflict before European games with Arsenal.

== Career statistics ==
Appearances and goals by club, season and competition
Club	Season	League			National cup		League cup		Europe		Other		Total	
Club	Season	Division	Apps	Goals	Apps	Goals	Apps	Goals	Apps	Goals	Apps	Goals	Apps	Goals
Osasuna B	1996–97	Segunda División B	2	0	—		—		—		—		2	0
Osasuna B	1997–98	Segunda División B	31	0	—		—		—		—		31	0
Osasuna B	1998–99	Segunda División B	13	0	—		—		—		—		13	0
Osasuna B	Total		46	0	—		—		—		—		46	0
Osasuna	1998–99	Segunda División	0	0	4	0	—		—		0	0	4	0
Cartagonova	1999–2000	Segunda División B	3	0	0	0	—		—		—		3	0
Sabadell	2000–01	Segunda División B	29	0	0	0	—		—		—		29	0
Eibar	2001–02	Segunda División	35	0	0	0	—		—		—		35	0
Recreativo	2002–03	La Liga	2	0	1	0	—		—		—		3	0
Albacete	2003–04	La Liga	24	0	1	0	—		—		—		25	0
Arsenal	2004–05	Premier League	10	0	2	0	3	0	1 (Note: Appearances in UEFA Champions League)	0	0	0	16	0
Arsenal	2005–06	Premier League	0	0	2	0	5	0	6	0	0	0	13	0
Arsenal	2006–07	Premier League	1	0	5	0	6	0	2	0	—		14	0
Arsenal	2007–08	Premier League	29	0	0	0	0	0	9	0	—		38	0
Arsenal	2008–09	Premier League	32	0	0	0	0	0	12	0	—		44	0
Arsenal	2009–10	Premier League	29	0	0	0	0	0	7	0	—		36	0
Arsenal	2010–11	Premier League	8	0	4	0	0	0	2	0	—		14	0
Arsenal	2011–12	Premier League	0	0	0	0	0	0	0	0	—		0	0
Arsenal	Total		109	0	13	0	14	0	39	0	—		175	0
West Ham United (loan)	2011–12	Championship	4	0	0	0	0	0	—		0	0	4	0
Watford	2012–13	Championship	39	0	0	0	1	0	—		3 (Note: Appearances in Football League play-offs)	0	43	0
Watford	2013–14	Championship	37	0	1	0	0	0	—		—		38	0
Watford	Total		76	0	1	0	1	0	—		3	0	81	0
Career total			328	0	20	0	15	0	39	0	3	0	405	0

== Honours ==
Arsenal

- FA Cup: 2004–05
- FA Community Shield: 2004
- Football League Cup runner-up: 2006–07, 2010–11
- UEFA Champions League runner-up: 2005–06

Individual

- Ricardo Zamora Trophy: 2001–02 Segunda División
