= Joaquín Moso =

Spanish footballer

Personal information
- Full name: Joaquín Andrés Moso Hernández
- Date of birth: 7 September 1978 (age 48)
- Place of birth: Zaragoza, Spain
- Height: 1.84 m (6 ft 1/2 in)
- Position: Goalkeeper

Youth career
- 1994–1997: Zaragoza

Senior career*
Years	Team	Apps	(Gls)
1995–2001	Zaragoza B	72	(0)
2001–2002	Gimnàstic	23	(0)
2002–2004	Albacete	0	(0)
2003	→ Eibar (loan)	8	(0)
2004–2005	Pontevedra	40	(0)
2005–2006	Hércules	22	(0)
2006–2007	Osasuna B	21	(0)
2007–2009	Linares	60	(0)
2009–2011	Sporting Mahonés	59	(0)
2011–2014	Sariñena	104	(0)
2014–2015	Caspe		
Total		409	(0)

International career
1994–1995	Spain U16	7	(0)
1995	Spain U17	3	(0)
1996	Spain U18	2	(0)
1998	Spain U21	1	(0)
- * Club domestic league appearances and goals

Joaquín Andrés Moso Hernández (born 7 September 1978) is a Spanish former footballer who played as a goalkeeper.

== Club career ==
Born in Zaragoza, Aragon, Moso spent several seasons with local Real Zaragoza, but was almost exclusively associated with the reserves during his seven-year spell, training occasionally with the first team. His professional input consisted of 93 Segunda División games with Gimnàstic de Tarragona, SD Eibar, Pontevedra CF and Hércules CF, being relegated with the first and the third clubs; in 2003–04 he was part of Albacete Balompié's La Liga squad, but appeared in no competitive matches.

After suffering relegation from Segunda División B with CD Sariñena at the end of the 2013–14 campaign, 36-year-old Moso signed with amateurs CD Caspe, also in his native region.

== International career ==
Moso earned 13 caps for Spain at youth level. His only for the under-21 side arrived on 17 November 1998, in a 0–0 friendly draw against Italy in Benevento.

== Honours ==
Spain U16

- UEFA European Under-16 Championship: Runner-up 1995
