= Óscar Montiel =

Spanish footballer

Personal information
- Full name: Óscar Montiel Marín
- Date of birth: 6 July 1970 (age 56)
- Place of birth: Palma, Spain
- Height: 1.76 m (5 ft 9 in)
- Position: Defender

Senior career*
Years	Team	Apps	(Gls)
1992–1993	Ibiza	36	(0)
1993–1995	Mallorca	32	(0)
1995–2001	Extremadura	231	(2)
2001–2005	Albacete	138	(1)
2005–2006	Manchego		
Total		437	(3)
- * Club domestic league appearances and goals

Óscar Montiel Marín (born 6 July 1970 in Palma de Mallorca, Balearic Islands) is a Spanish retired footballer who played as either a right-back or a central defender. His son, Tòfol, is also a professional footballer.
