= Pedro Hernández (footballer, born 1978) =

Spanish footballer

Personal information
- Full name: Pedro Hernández Martínez
- Date of birth: 2 October 1978 (age 48)
- Place of birth: Madrid, Spain
- Height: 1.72 m (5 ft 8 in)
- Position: Right-back

Team information
- Current team: Collado Villalba (assistant)

Youth career
- Atlético Madrid

Senior career*
Years	Team	Apps	(Gls)
1998	Amorós		
1998–2002	Atlético Madrid B	42	(1)
2001–2002	→ Albacete (loan)	33	(0)
2002–2004	Albacete	13	(0)
2004–2005	Ciudad Murcia	30	(0)
2005–2010	Castellón	124	(1)
2010–2012	Leganés	54	(0)
2012–2015	Toledo	53	(3)
Total		349	(5)

Managerial career
- 2021–2022: Leganés (assistant)
- 2023–2024: Tenerife (assistant)
- 2024–: Collado Villalba (assistant)
- * Club domestic league appearances and goals

Pedro Hernández Martínez (born 2 October 1978 in Madrid) is a Spanish former professional footballer who played as a right-back, currently assistant manager of CU Collado Villalba.
