= David Sánchez (footballer, born 1982) =

Spanish footballer and manager

Personal information
- Full name: David Sánchez Rodríguez
- Date of birth: 25 July 1982 (age 44)
- Place of birth: Seville, Spain
- Height: 1.88 m (6 ft 2 in)
- Position: Midfielder

Team information
- Current team: Linense (manager)

Youth career
- 1999–2000: Sevilla
- 2000–2001: Barcelona

Senior career*
Years	Team	Apps	(Gls)
2001	Barcelona C	12	(3)
2001–2005	Barcelona B	74	(14)
2003–2005	→ Albacete (loan)	47	(1)
2005	→ Alavés (loan)	8	(1)
2005–2007	Albacete	60	(3)
2007–2008	Gimnàstic	17	(1)
2008–2009	Politehnica Timişoara	1	(0)
2009	→ Gloria Buzău (loan)	11	(1)
2010	Castellón	0	(0)
2010–2011	Elche	28	(2)
2011–2013	Atlético Baleares	72	(7)
2013–2014	Gimnàstic	38	(1)
2014–2015	Melilla	53	(17)
2016	Cádiz	21	(3)
2016–2017	Atlético Baleares	17	(0)
2017–2019	Murcia	54	(1)
2018–2019	→ Orihuela (loan)	24	(2)
Total		537	(57)

International career
2000–2001	Spain U18	4	(0)

Managerial career
- 2019–2021: Murcia (youth)
- 2021–2023: Murcia B
- 2023–2025: Xerez Deportivo
- 2025–: Linense
- * Club domestic league appearances and goals

David Sánchez Rodríguez (born 25 July 1982) is a Spanish former professional footballer who played as a defensive or attacking midfielder. He currently is the manager of Tercera Federación club Linense.

He spent most of his 18-year career in the Segunda División B, totalling 111 Segunda División games and seven goals over five seasons while appearing for Alavés, Albacete, Gimnàstic de Tarragona and Elche. He added 47 matches in La Liga (with Albacete), and also made one competitive appearance with Barcelona.

== Playing career ==
A trainee of both Sevilla FC (early) and FC Barcelona (with whom he featured in a UEFA Champions League game, against Club Brugge KV), Sánchez was born in Seville, Andalusia, and he made his debut in La Liga with Albacete Balompié in 2003–04. On 19 October 2003, after a team effort, he scored from a lob in a 3–1 home win over Real Sociedad – his only goal of the season.

Sánchez spent the second half of the 2004–05 campaign in the Segunda División, loaned to Deportivo Alavés, and appeared rarely as the Basques returned to the top flight. He then completed another two solid years with Albacete, joining them in summer 2005 after being released by Barcelona.

In July 2007, Sánchez moved to second-tier Gimnàstic de Tarragona. Scarcely used, he joined Romanian club FC Timişoara at the end of the season, being loaned to FC Gloria Buzău in January 2009 and being released in July after only 12 total appearances.

After spending the first months of the new campaign training on his own, Sánchez moved in January 2010 to CD Castellón of division two, making no appearances as the Valencian team also suffered relegation. In August, he signed with another side in that league, Elche CF.

Sánchez left the club at the end of 2010–11, amid rumours that he had sold out to Granada CF during the top-division promotion play-offs. Shortly after, he signed for CD Atlético Baleares in the Segunda División B.

On 13 July 2013, Sánchez returned to Gimnàstic, now in the third tier of Spanish football. On 23 July of the following year, he moved to UD Melilla in the same division.

Sánchez continued to compete in the lower leagues or amateur football until his retirement at the age of 37, representing in the process Cádiz CF, Atlético Baleares, Real Murcia CF and Orihuela CF.

== Coaching career ==
On 4 July 2019, Sánchez was appointed manager of Murcia's under-17 squad as well as part of the club's technical secretariat. He started coaching in his own right two years later, being in charge of Real Murcia Imperial and later Xerez Deportivo FC also in the newly created Tercera Federación.

Sánchez achieved promotion to Segunda Federación with Xerez at the end of 2023–24, and subsequently renewed his contract for two more seasons. However, he was dismissed on 9 February 2025 after eight matches without a win.

On 6 June 2025, Sánchez was named head coach of Real Balompédica Linense, recently relegated to the fifth tier.

== Managerial statistics ==
As of match played 22 February 2026

Managerial record by team and tenure
Team	Nat	From	To	Record								Ref
Team	Nat	From	To	G	W	D	L	GF	GA	GD	Win %	Ref
Murcia B	(Spain)	5 July 2021	2 June 2023	64	27	14	23	88	78	+10	42.19	
Xerez Deportivo	(Spain)	2 June 2023	9 February 2025	63	25	23	15	74	49	+25	39.68	
Linense	(Spain)	6 June 2025	Present	22	10	9	3	36	21	+15	45.45	
Career total				149	62	46	41	198	148	+50	41.61	—
