= Unai Vergara =

Spanish footballer (born 1977)

Unai
Personal information
- Full name: Unai Vergara Díez-Caballero
- Date of birth: 20 January 1977 (age 49)
- Place of birth: Portugalete, Spain
- Height: 1.90 m (6 ft 3 in)
- Position: Centre-back

Youth career
- Masnou
- Ferrán Martorell

Senior career*
Years	Team	Apps	(Gls)
1996–1997	Sant Andreu	31	(2)
1997–1999	Gramenet	70	(7)
1999–2000	Mérida	38	(4)
2000–2004	Villarreal	60	(5)
2003–2004	→ Albacete (loan)	14	(0)
2004–2005	Elche	15	(0)
2005–2007	Lleida	26	(1)
2007–2008	Gavà	34	(3)
Total		288	(22)

International career
2000	Spain U21	1	(0)
2000	Spain U23	3	(0)
2001	Spain	1	(0)
Medal record
Representing Spain
Men's Football
Silver medal – second place	2000 Sydney	Team competition
- * Club domestic league appearances and goals

Unai Vergara Díez-Caballero (born 20 January 1977), known simply as Unai, is a Spanish former professional footballer who played as a central defender.

He amassed La Liga totals of 74 matches and five goals over four seasons, almost exclusively with Villarreal. The owner of a powerful left-foot shot, he also played in the competition with Albacete.

== Club career ==
Unai was born in Portugalete, Biscay. After three seasons playing with modest sides in the Catalonia area, he represented CP Mérida in 1999–2000's Segunda División, where he produced a fine individual campaign; however, although the Extremadurans finished sixth, the club was relegated due to unpaid wages.

Subsequently, Unai joined Villarreal CF, which had just returned to La Liga. He was relatively used during three seasons, also adding three goals in his first. His first match in the competition took place on 28 October 2000, when he came off the bench in a 0–0 home draw against Athletic Bilbao.

Following a string of injuries (some serious), Unai had an unassuming loan spell at Albacete Balompié, being released in June 2004 and going on to represent Elche CF, UE Lleida (second tier) and CF Gavà (Segunda División B). He settled in Andorra after retiring aged 31, going on to notably work for Promoesport as sports agent for several players and managers.

== International career ==
On 28 February 2001, Unai made his sole appearance for Spain, playing 90 minutes in a 3–0 friendly loss against England in Birmingham. Previously, he represented the nation at the 2000 Summer Olympics, playing three times for the silver medalists.

Unai was the first-ever Villarreal player to be called up for either team.

== Honours ==
Spain U23

- Summer Olympic silver medal: 2000
