= Mikel Aguirregomezkorta =

Spanish footballer (born 1974)

Personal information
- Full name: Mikel Aguirregomezkorta Larrea
- Date of birth: 26 August 1974 (age 52)
- Place of birth: Bilbao, Spain
- Height: 1.89 m (6 ft 2 in)
- Position: Centre forward

Senior career*
Years	Team	Apps	(Gls)
1994–1995	Leioa		
1995–1997	Barakaldo	43	(6)
1997–1999	Athletic Bilbao B	69	(18)
1999–2000	Lleida	24	(0)
2000–2006	Albacete Balompié	138	(16)
2006–2009	Alicante	3	(0)
Total		277	(40)

Managerial career
- 2010: Barakaldo
- 2011–2013: Cultural Durango
- * Club domestic league appearances and goals as of 5 January 2021

Mikel Aguirregomezkorta Larrea (born 26 August 1974), known during his playing career simply as Mikel, is a Spanish former professional footballer who played as a centre forward.

He represented several clubs in Spain, and played for two seasons in La Liga with Albacete Balompié. After retirement in 2009, he worked as a coach, including a brief spell as head coach of Barakaldo.

== Playing career ==
=== Early career ===
Mikel, a right-footed centre forward, was born in Bilbao in the province of Biscay in the Basque Country. He began his career in 1994 with Bilbao club Leioa, then in the Primera División de Bizkaia in the sixth tier of Spanish football. After one season with Leioa, he jumped up to Segunda División B with Barakaldo, also located within Greater Bilbao.

He made his Barakaldo debut on 1 October 1995, coming on with 25 minutes left in a 0–0 away draw with Cultural Leonesa at Estadio Antonio Amilivia. His home debut came a week later in another 0–0 draw against Real Avilés Industrial, in which he was again a second half substitute. He found his way into the starting eleven for the next match, a 1–0 loss away at Numancia on 12 October, and held his place three days later for the 1–0 home win over Osasuna B. Overall, he made 14 appearances in his first season with the club, which ended badly as he was sent off in the 1–0 away loss to Izarra at Estadio Merkatondoa on 5 May.

In 1996–97, Mikel was a more integral part of the team, making 35 appearances in all competitions. The highlight of the season was the home fixture against Real Unión in which he came off the bench in the 77th minute with the scores at 1–1. He scored his first Barakaldo goal in the 83rd minute to give his side the lead, and added two more before the final whistle to secure a remarkable hattrick and a 4–1 win. He scored three more goals that season, coming in consecutive victories against Real Sociedad B, Athletic Bilbao B and Cultural Leonesa in April and May.

It was also a successful season for the club, as they placed third in their group and qualified for the promotion play-offs. However, of their six play-off games, they lost four and drew the other two, thus finishing bottom of their group and failing to be promoted. Mikel played in five of the games, but the 1–0 home loss to group winners Elche would prove to be his last for Barakaldo, as he left the club at the end of the season.

=== Athletic Bilbao ===
Having spent his whole life in Bilbao, Mikel finally joined the city's biggest club, Athletic Bilbao, in 1997. However, in his two years there, he only ever appeared for the B team, which, like his previous club, played in Segunda División B at the time. He made his debut for the team on 7 September 1997, playing the last 34 minutes of a 2–0 loss to Valladolid B at Ciudad Deportiva del Real Valladolid. A week later, he was in the starting line-up for the 2–2 home draw against Aurrerá de Vitoria at Lezama. His third match was away to his former club, Barakaldo, and he marked the occasion with his first Athletic goal, which helped his new side to a 4–3 victory. He ultimately scored 8 times in 37 appearances that season, as he was part of a team qualifying for the promotion play-offs for the second year running. Mallorca B were ultimately the promoted team from Group C, in which Athletic finished third.

In 1998–99 Mikel played 36 times, and scored 10 times, the only time in his career he would reach double figures in a single season. The highlight was scoring a hattrick at El Malecón in a 5–0 win over Gimnástica de Torrelavega on 20 September, but by the end of the season he was ready for a new challenge. Athletic's final match of the season, a disappointing 1–0 loss at Lezama on 23 May against Noja, would be his last for the club.

=== Lleida ===
Mikel's good form earned him a move up to the Segunda División, as he left his native Basque Country for the first time to join Lleida in Catalonia. His debut for his new club came in the opening match of the season, a 2–2 home draw with Villarreal at Camp d'Esports on 21 August, in which he played the last 17 minutes. However, it took him until 17 October to make his first start, which came in a 3–1 loss to Osasuna at Estadio El Sadar. He kept his for the 3–1 home win against Compostela a week later, and from then on was a prominent part of the team.

Despite 28 appearances, Mikel was unable to replicate his goal scoring form from the previous year, netting just once. The solitary goal came in the first leg of Lleida's Copa del Rey Round of 16 tie against Rayo Vallecano; despite Mikel's contribution, they lost the match 3–2 and the tie 6–3 on aggregate. His time at Lleida would prove to be just one season, and a 2–0 loss to Eibar at Ipurua Municipal Stadium on 28 May was his last for the club.

=== Albacete Balompié ===
After four clubs in six years, Mikel finally found some stability by joining Lleida's Segunda División rivals Albacete Balompié in the summer of 2000. He was a regular starter immediately, making his debut in Albacete's first game of the season, a 1–0 home win over Tenerife at Estadio Carlos Belmonte on 2 September. Despite regular appearances, he had to wait until 21 February to score his first Albacete goal, a consolation in a 3–2 loss to Racing de Ferrol at A Malata. His form picked up from there, however, and he finished the season with six goals in 33 appearances, including a brace in an excellent 4–1 win over Córdoba at Estadio Nuevo Arcángel on 10 June.

2001–02 saw Mikel feature less prominently, playing only seven times, although he did manage to score twice. The following season, though, was a better one for both player and club. 27 appearances in all competitions yielded 3 goals for Mikel, which helped Albacete to 3rd place in the league and promotion back to La Liga after seven years away.

Mikel made his La Liga debut at home on 14 September, and it was something of a baptism of fire as he came off the bench against Barcelona in a match which Albacete ultimately lost 2–1. Two weeks later he scored his first goal in the top flight, as Albacete secured a fine 2–0 home win over Real Mallorca. His first La Liga start came against Real Murcia at Estadio de La Condomina on 5 October, as Albacete lost 1–0. He made 29 appearances that season, scoring five times, as Albacete finished 14th and secured a second season in the top division.

2004–05 was less successful for both Mikel and his club. While he again played 29 matches in the league, plus two in the Copa del Rey, he failed to score all season, the first such failure since his debut season with Barakaldo in 1995–96. Albacete had a dreadful season, winning just six times and being relegated in last place.

With the club returning to the Segunda División, Mikel's role in the team began to diminish: in 2005–06 he played just 16 times in all competitions. He scored just once that year, in a 2–2 home draw with Ciudad de Murcia on 11 June. Five days later Albacete faced Tenerife at Estadio Heliodoro Rodríguez López in their final match of the season, and the 1–1 draw proved to be Mikel's last for the club. He departed Albacete after six years, having made 143 appearances and scored 17 goals.

=== Alicante ===
He dropped back to Segunda División B ahead of the 2006–07 season, joining Alicante. He featured in four of Alicante's first five matches of the season: a 1–0 loss away to Osasuna B, victories away against Villajoyosa and at home against Eldense, and their Copa del Rey elimination at the hands of his former club Lleida. However, these would prove to be his only matches for the club. He was struggling with a knee injury, and finally formally retired in 2009, just before his 35th birthday.

== Coaching career ==
Following his retirement, Mikel moved rapidly into management. On 24 March 2010, Javier González Etxeberria was dismissed as manager of his former club Barakaldo, and Mikel was appointed in his place. His first match in charge of the Segunda División B club was a home tie against Cultural Leonesa, and he got off to a winning start with a 1–0 win at Estadio de Lasesarre. He led the team to two further victories in the remaining seven games of the season, plus three draws, and they finished in a respectable 11th position.

The 2010–11 season started badly, with a 2–0 loss against Mirandés at Estadio Municipal de Anduva on 29 August. Although they won their next match, 2–0 at home to Sporting de Gijón B, this would prove to be a false dawn. Following a 2–1 loss to SD Eibar at Ipurua on 18 December, they lay in the relegation zone in 18th place, having won just four of their eighteen matches. Mikel was sacked before the next match and replaced by Alfonso del Barrio. Del Barrio didn't improve the team's fortunes, and neither he nor Pedro Platas, who would also coach the team before the end of the season, won a single league match in charge. Unsurprisingly, Barakaldo were relegated after finishing bottom of the table.

After about half a season out of work, Mikel was appointed as the coach of Cultural Durango in the Tercera División ahead of the 2011–12 season. He led the team for two seasons, guiding them to a 7th and 8th place finish respectively.

== Honours ==
Albacete Balompié

- Segunda División third place: 2002–03 (earning promotion to La Liga)

Alicante

- Segunda División B: 2006–07
- Segunda División B runners-up: 2007–08 (earning promotion to Segunda División)

== Career statistics ==
=== As a player ===
As of 27 December 2020

Club	Season	League			Cup		Other		Total	
Club	Season	Division	Apps	Goals	Apps	Goals	Apps	Goals	Apps	Goals
Barakaldo	1995–96	Segunda División B	14	0	–	–	–	–	14	0
Barakaldo	1996–97	Segunda División B	29	6	1	0	5	0	35	6
Barakaldo	Total		43	6	1	0	5	0	49	6
Athletic Bilbao B	1997–98	Segunda División B	33	8	–	–	4	0	37	8
Athletic Bilbao B	1998–99	Segunda División B	36	10	–	–	–	–	36	10
Athletic Bilbao B	Total		69	18	0	0	4	0	73	18
Lleida	1999–2000	Segunda División	24	0	4	1	–	–	28	1
Albacete Balompié	2000–01	Segunda División	32	6	1	0	–	–	33	6
Albacete Balompié	2001–02	Segunda División	7	2	0	0	–	–	7	2
Albacete Balompié	2002–03	Segunda División	26	2	1	1	–	–	27	3
Albacete Balompié	2003–04	La Liga	29	5	0	0	–	–	29	5
Albacete Balompié	2004–05	La Liga	29	0	2	0	–	–	31	0
Albacete Balompié	2005–06	Segunda División	15	1	1	0	–	–	16	1
Albacete Balompié	Total		138	16	5	1	0	0	143	17
Alicante	2006–07	Segunda División B	3	0	1	0	–	–	4	0
Alicante	2007–08	Segunda División B	0	0	0	0	–	–	0	0
Alicante	2008–09	Segunda División	0	0	0	0	–	–	0	0
Alicante	Total		3	0	1	0	0	0	4	0
Career total			277	40	11	2	9	0	297	42

1. Appearances in the 1997 Segunda División B play-offs
2. Appearances in the 1998 Segunda División B play-offs

=== As a manager ===
As of 11 January 2021

Managerial record by team and tenure
Team	Nat	From	To	Record							
Team	Nat	From	To	G	W	D	L	GF	GA	GD	Win %
Barakaldo	(Spain)	27 March 2010	18 December 2010	26	7	7	12	27	30	−3	26.92
