= Miquel Buades =

Spanish association football player

Personal information
- Full name: Miquel Buades Crespí
- Date of birth: 4 March 1980 (age 46)
- Place of birth: Sa Pobla, Spain
- Height: 1.87 m (6 ft 2 in)
- Position: Centre back

Senior career*
Years	Team	Apps	(Gls)
1998–2002	Mallorca B	69	(3)
2000–2001	Real Mallorca	0	(0)
2002–2007	Albacete Balompié	106	(8)
Total		175	(11)
- * Club domestic league appearances and goals as of 30 December 2020

Miquel Buades Crespí (born 4 March 1980) is a Spanish former footballer who played as a centre back.

He began his career with Real Mallorca, playing primarily with their reserve team, before moving to Albacete Balompié. He made 113 appearances over five years with Albacete, including 55 in La Liga.

== Career ==
=== Real Mallorca ===
Buades was born in Sa Pobla in the district of Raiguer on Majorca, one of the Balearic Islands. Unsurprisingly, he began his career with local side Real Mallorca, initially with the reserve team. His first appearances came during the 1998–99 Segunda División campaign, coming off the bench in the last ten minutes in Mallorca B's 2–1 home win over Leganés at the Lluís Sitjar Stadium on 2 January, and their 1–0 win away at Badajoz eight days later. The team were relegated to Segunda División B at the end of the season.

The following year was a breakthrough season for Buades. He made his full debut at home to Premià in the first match of the season, which ended 1–1, and made 36 appearances as Mallorca B missed out on the promotion play-offs by just one point. 2000–01 saw him play a less significant part, playing only 10 times, but he did receive his first call-up to the senior team. He was in the starting line-up for the home leg of Mallorca's UEFA Intertoto Cup tie against Ceahlăul Piatra Neamț of Romania at Estadio de San Moix, which ended 2–1 to the Spanish side. This would ultimately prove to be his only appearance for the Mallorca first team.

Buades played a more integral role in the B team during 2001–02, making 21 appearances. He also scored his first goal, a first half penalty in the 2–1 win at home to San Fernando on 28 October, and followed it up with a second a week later away to Algeciras at Estadio Nuevo Mirador. The latter match also finished 2–1 to Mallorca B. He netted a third goal in the 1–1 draw against Motril at Estadio Escribano Castilla on 24 March.

He also received a second European call-up to the first team, being named as a substitute for the home leg of their UEFA Cup third round tie against Czech side Slovan Liberec. He was not used during the match, which Slovan won 2–1. Mallorca B's 2–1 home loss to Almería on 19 April would prove to be his last for the club, which he left at the end of the season.

=== Albacete Balompié ===
Buades moved to Albacete Balompié, in the Segunda División, for the 2002–03 season. He made his debut in the Copa del Rey last 32 tie on 11 September: Albacete hosted Eibar at Estadio Carlos Belmonte and lost 2–1. He was not a first choice during his first season, and didn't make his league debut until 21 December, when he came on with 19 minutes to play in the 3–3 draw with Compostela at Estadio Vero Boquete de San Lázaro. He had to wait until 23 March for his next appearance, when he was in the starting line-up for a 2–0 home win over Leganés. Overall, he made just six appearances that year, although he did net his first Albacete goal in the 89th minute of the 3–1 win at home to Getafe on 8 June, having come off the bench in the second half.

Although Buades's involvement was slight, it had been a successful year for Alabcete, who were promoted in third place. This gave Buades the chance to make his La Liga debut during the 2003–04 season, which he duly did on 26 October in a 3–2 loss to Real Betis at Estadio Manuel Ruiz de Lopera. He started again three days later in an excellent 2–0 home win over Villarreal, and featured more heavily for the rest of the year, playing 25 times in all.

Albacete survived their first La Liga campaign, but were not so lucky the following season, winning just six matches all year and finishing bottom of the table. However, Buades had a good season, playing in 32 matches and scoring his first La Liga goals - in the 3–2 loss to Osasuna at Estadio El Sadar on 17 October, and the 1–1 home draw with Getafe on 21 November.

Following Albacete's return to the Segunda División, Buades continued to play regularly, making 22 appearances in 2005–06 and 28 the following year. The latter season also saw his highest goal tally, as he found the net four times, including a brace in the 4–1 home win over Cádiz on 22 October. However, the 1–0 loss to Polideportivo Ejido at Estadio Municipal Santo Domingo on 26 May would prove to be Buades's last as a professional. Despite offers from clubs throughout Europe, he chose to retire from football at the age of just 27 to focus on his restaurant business.

== Honours ==
Albacete Balompié

- Segunda División third place: 2002–03 (earning promotion to La Liga)

== Career statistics ==
As of 27 December 2020

Club	Season	League			Cup		Europe		Total	
Club	Season	Division	Apps	Goals	Apps	Goals	Apps	Goals	Apps	Goals
Mallorca B	1998–99	Segunda División	2	0	–	–	–	–	2	0
Mallorca B	1999–2000	Segunda División B	36	0	–	–	–	–	36	0
Mallorca B	2000–01	Segunda División B	10	0	–	–	–	–	10	0
Mallorca B	2001–02	Segunda División B	21	3	–	–	–	–	21	3
Mallorca B	Total		69	3	0	0	0	0	69	3
Real Mallorca	2000–01	La Liga	0	0	0	0	1	0	1	0
Real Mallorca	2001–02	La Liga	0	0	0	0	0	0	0	0
Real Mallorca	Total		0	0	0	0	1	0	1	0
Albacete Balompié	2002–03	Segunda División	5	1	1	0	–	–	6	1
Albacete Balompié	2003–04	La Liga	24	0	1	0	–	–	25	0
Albacete Balompié	2004–05	La Liga	31	2	1	0	–	–	32	2
Albacete Balompié	2005–06	Segunda División	19	1	3	0	–	–	22	1
Albacete Balompié	2006–07	Segunda División	27	4	1	0	–	–	28	4
Albacete Balompié	Total		106	8	7	0	0	0	113	8
Career total			175	11	7	0	1	0	183	11

1. Appearances in the 2000 UEFA Intertoto Cup
