= Salamanca AC =

Spanish football club

Salamanca Athletic
- Full name: Salamanca Athletic Club, S.A.D.
- Nicknames: SAC, Salamanca AC
- Founded: 2013
- Dissolved: 2016
- Ground: El Helmántico, Salamanca, Castile and León, Spain
- Capacity: 17,341
- Chairman: Juan José Hidalgo
Home colours	Away colours

Salamanca Athletic Club, S.A.D. was a Spanish football team based in Salamanca, in the autonomous community of Castile and León.

It was founded on 28 June 2013, after UD Salamanca's dissolution, but has never played any official match. In July 2016, the club was dissolved by the Supreme Court.

== History ==
Salamanca AC was founded on 28 June 2013, as a replacement for UD Salamanca which was dissolved due to financial issues. Initially assigned to Tercera División, the Royal Spanish Football Federation admitted the club in Segunda División B shortly after, but finally it did not register to play in any competition. The club did not appear in the following campaign either. The same happened before the 2015-16 season

In July 2016, the Supreme Court finally gave the reason to the Royal Spanish Football Federation and would probably suppose the dissolution of the Salamanca AC project.

=== Club background ===
- Unión Deportiva Salamanca - (1923–2013)
- Salamanca Athletic Club - (2013–2016) did not play in any official competition
