= Pablo Sierra (footballer) =

Spanish footballer

Personal information
- Full name: Pablo Sierra Madrazo
- Date of birth: 3 October 1978 (age 48)
- Place of birth: Santander, Spain
- Height: 1.74 m (5 ft 8 1/2 in)
- Position: Winger

Senior career*
Years	Team	Apps	(Gls)
1996–1997	Escobedo		
1997–1998	Guarnizo		
1998–2001	Racing B	36	(3)
2001–2005	Racing Santander	48	(4)
2003	→ Albacete (loan)	17	(0)
2003–2004	→ Córdoba (loan)	49	(3)
2005–2006	Murcia	23	(1)
2006–2007	Lleida	29	(2)
2007–2008	Aris		
2008–2009	Sant Andreu	28	(1)
2010	Burgos		
- * Club domestic league appearances and goals

Pablo Sierra Madrazo (born 3 October 1978) is a Spanish former professional footballer who played as a right winger.

== Club career ==
Born in Santander, Cantabria, Sierra played with amateur clubs in his native region until 1998 when he signed with Racing de Santander, first being assigned to the B team also in the lower leagues. He made his debut with the main squad during the 2001–02 season, scoring three goals in 38 games in an eventual promotion to La Liga after one year out.

Sierra played his first match in the Spanish top flight on 31 August 2002, coming on as a late substitute in a 0–1 home loss against Real Valladolid. On 24 November, he opened an eventual 2–1 away defeat to Recreativo de Huelva for his only goal in the competition.

Sierra subsequently began a series of loans in the Segunda División, being definitely released in summer 2005 and joining Real Murcia CF also at that level.
