= 2004–05 Albacete Balompié season =

Albacete Balompié
2004–05 season
- President: Ángel Contreras Plasencia
- Manager: José González (until 20 February); Martín Monteagudo (from 26 February)
- Stadium: Carlos Belmonte
- La Liga: 20th (relegated)
- Copa del Rey: Round of 32
- Top goalscorer: League: Antonio Pacheco (12); All: Antonio Pacheco (12)

The 2004–05 season was the 64th season in Albacete Balompié's history.

== Squad ==
Retrieved on 28 December 2020

Note: Flags indicate national team as defined under FIFA eligibility rules; some limited exceptions apply. Players may hold more than one non-FIFA nationality.

No.	Pos.	Nation	Player
1	GK	BEL	Ronny Gaspercic
2	DF	ESP	Óscar Montiel
3	DF	ESP	Mingo
4	MF	FRA	Laurent Viaud
5	DF	ESP	Gaspar Gálvez
6	DF	ESP	Rubén (on loan from Real Madrid)
7	FW	ESP	Francisco
8	DF	ESP	Santi (on loan from Atlético Madrid)
8	FW	NGA	Abass Lawal
9	FW	ESP	Rubén Castro (on loan from Deportivo La Coruña)
10	MF	ESP	Iván Díaz
11	MF	CHI	Mark González
12	DF	ARG	Gustavo Siviero
13	GK	ESP	Ángel Pindado
14	FW	URU	Nicolás Olivera
15	MF	ESP	Jaime
16	MF	ESP	David Sánchez
17	MF	ESP	Pablo Redondo
18	MF	ESP	Álvaro Rubio

No.	Pos.	Nation	Player
19	DF	ESP	Paco Peña
20	FW	URU	Antonio Pacheco (on loan from Internazionale)
21	FW	ESP	Mikel
22	DF	ESP	Miquel Buades
23	FW	URU	Horacio Peralta
24	MF	ESP	Momo (on loan from Deportivo La Coruña)
25	GK	ESP	Raúl Valbuena (on loan from Real Zaragoza)
26	DF	ESP	Pablo García Moreno
27	MF	ESP	Elías
31	FW	ESP	Manuel Gato
32	DF	ESP	Carlos Alfaro
34	MF	ESP	Pablo García López
—	DF	ESP	Agus
—	DF	ESP	Jordi Ferrón
—	MF	ESP	Alberto Cano
—	FW	ESP	Martín Camaño
—	FW	ESP	Iñaki
—	FW	ESP	Luismi (on loan from Espanyol)

=== Transfers ===
==== In ====
#	Pos	Player	From	Notes
Summer
1	GK	(Belgium) Ronny Gaspercic	(Spain) Deportivo Alavés	
3	DF	(Spain) Mingo	(Spain) Real Betis	
5	DF	(Spain) Gaspar Gálvez	(Spain) Atlético Madrid	
6	DF	(Spain) Rubén	(Spain) Real Madrid	Loan
7	FW	(Spain) Francisco	(Spain) Almería	
9	FW	(Spain) Rubén Castro	(Spain) Deportivo La Coruña	Loan
11	MF	(Chile) Mark González	(Chile) Universidad Católica	
13	GK	(Spain) Ángel Pindado	(Belgium) Antwerp	
15	MF	(Spain) Jaime	(Spain) Deportivo La Coruña	
24	MF	(Spain) Momo	(Spain) Deportivo La Coruña	Loan
25	GK	(Spain) Raúl Valbuena	(Spain) Real Zaragoza	Loan
	DF	(Spain) Jordi Ferrón	(Spain) Real Zaragoza	Free transfer
	FW	(Spain) Luismi	(Spain) Espanyol	Loan
Winter
8	DF	(Spain) Santi	(Spain) Atlético Madrid	Loan
14	FW	(Uruguay) Nicolás Olivera	(Uruguay) Defensor Sporting	
23	FW	(Uruguay) Horacio Peralta	(Italy) Cagliari	

==== Out ====
#	Pos	Player	To	Notes
Summer
1	GK	(Spain) Manuel Almunia	(Spain) Celta Vigo	Loan return
5	DF	(Spain) Pedro	(Spain) Ciudad de Murcia	
6	MF	(Spain) José Simeón	(Spain) Xerez	
7	MF	(Spain) Líbero Parri	(Spain) Valencia	Loan return
9	DF	(Spain) Fernando Navarro	(Spain) Barcelona	Loan return
11	MF	(Brazil) Fabiano	(Mexico) Necaxa	
14	FW	(Spain) Carlos Aranda	(Spain) Sevilla	
15	DF	(Spain) Unai	(Spain) Villarreal	Loan return
17	MF	(Romania) Cătălin Munteanu	(Spain) Atlético Madrid	Loan return
22	DF	(Spain) Pablo Ibáñez	(Spain) Atlético Madrid	€3.5 million
23	MF	(France) Ludovic Delporte	(Spain) Osasuna	
24	FW	(Spain) Basti	(Spain) Xerez	
25	GK	(Spain) Joaquín Moso	(Spain) Pontevedra	
	MF	(Spain) Manolo	(Spain) Polideportivo Ejido	
	FW	(Brazil) Cacá	(Spain) Las Palmas	
Winter
8	FW	(Nigeria) Abass Lawal	(Spain) Xerez	
12	DF	(Argentina) Gustavo Siviero	(Argentina) Colón	
16	MF	(Spain) David Sánchez	(Spain) Deportivo Alavés	Loan
	FW	(Spain) Luismi	(Spain) Espanyol	Loan return

== Squad stats ==
Last updated on 29 December 2020.

No.	Pos	Nat	Player	Total		La Liga		Copa del Rey	
No.	Pos	Nat	Player	Apps	Goals	Apps	Goals	Apps	Goals
1	GK	(Belgium) BEL	Ronny Gaspercic	19	0	16+1	0	2	0
2	DF	(Spain) ESP	Óscar Montiel	25	0	15+8	0	2	0
3	DF	(Spain) ESP	Mingo	15	0	15	0	0	0
4	MF	(France) FRA	Laurent Viaud	27	1	19+6	1	2	0
5	DF	(Spain) ESP	Gaspar Gálvez	26	1	23+2	1	0+1	0
6	DF	(Spain) ESP	Rubén	23	0	21+1	0	1	0
7	FW	(Spain) ESP	Francisco	28	3	17+11	3	0	0
8	DF	(Spain) ESP	Santi	12	0	12	0	0	0
9	FW	(Spain) ESP	Rubén Castro	22	3	14+8	3	0	0
10	MF	(Spain) ESP	Iván Díaz	10	1	3+5	0	2	1
11	MF	(Chile) CHI	Mark González	25	5	16+9	5	0	0
13	GK	(Spain) ESP	Ángel Pindado	1	0	1	0	0	0
14	FW	(Uruguay) URU	Nicolás Olivera	4	0	1+3	0	0	0
15	MF	(Spain) ESP	Jaime	22	0	20+2	0	0	0
17	MF	(Spain) ESP	Pablo Redondo	31	5	28+2	5	0+1	0
18	MF	(Spain) ESP	Álvaro Rubio	30	0	25+3	0	0+2	0
19	DF	(Spain) ESP	Paco Peña	33	0	33	0	0	0
20	FW	(Uruguay) URU	Antonio Pacheco	34	12	34	12	0	0
21	FW	(Spain) ESP	Mikel	31	0	11+18	0	2	0
22	DF	(Spain) ESP	Miquel Buades	32	2	31	2	1	0
23	FW	(Uruguay) URU	Horacio Peralta	12	0	7+5	0	0	0
24	MF	(Spain) ESP	Momo	26	1	16+8	1	2	0
25	GK	(Spain) ESP	Raúl Valbuena	21	0	21	0	0	0
26	DF	(Spain) ESP	Pablo García Moreno	2	0	1+1	0	0	0
27	MF	(Spain) ESP	Elías	1	0	1	0	0	0
31	FW	(Spain) ESP	Manuel Gato	2	0	0+2	0	0	0
32	DF	(Spain) ESP	Carlos Alfaro	1	0	1	0	0	0
	DF	(Spain) ESP	Agus	7	0	7	0	0	0
	DF	(Spain) ESP	Jordi Ferrón	3	0	0+1	0	2	0
	MF	(Spain) ESP	Alberto Cano	2	0	1+1	0	0	0
	FW	(Spain) ESP	Martín Camaño	1	0	0+1	0	0	0
	FW	(Spain) ESP	Iñaki	1	0	0+1	0	0	0
Players who have left the club after the start of the season:
8	FW	(Nigeria) NGA	Abass Lawal	2	0	1	0	1	0
12	DF	(Argentina) ARG	Gustavo Siviero	3	0	1	0	2	0
16	MF	(Spain) ESP	David Sánchez	20	0	6+12	0	2	0
	FW	(Spain) ESP	Luismi	3	0	0+1	0	1+1	0

== Competitions ==
=== Overall ===
Competition	Final position
La Liga	20th (relegated)
Copa del Rey	Round of 32

=== La Liga ===
==== League table ====
Pos	Team	Pld	W	D	L	GF	GA	GD	Pts	Qualification or relegation
16	Racing Santander	38	12	8	18	41	58	−17	44	
17	Mallorca	38	10	9	19	42	63	−21	39	
18	Levante (R)	38	9	10	19	39	58	−19	37	Relegation to the Segunda División
19	Numancia (R)	38	6	11	21	30	61	−31	29	Relegation to the Segunda División
20	Albacete (R)	38	6	10	22	33	56	−23	28	Relegation to the Segunda División

Source: LFP
Rules for classification: 1st points; 2nd head-to-head points; 3rd head-to-head goal difference; 4th head-to-head goals scored; 5th goal difference; 6th number of goals scored; 7th Fair-play points
(R) Relegated

==== Matches ====
Win Draw Loss

Match	Opponent	Venue	Result
1	Sevilla	A	0–1
2	Atlético Madrid	H	0–2
3	Real Zaragoza	A	3–4
4	Real Mallorca	H	0–0
5	Numancia	A	0–0
6	Espanyol	H	1–0
7	Osasuna	A	2–3
8	Athletic Bilbao	H	1–0
9	Deportivo La Coruña	A	0–0
10	Real Betis	H	0–0
11	Real Madrid	A	1–6
12	Getafe	H	1–1
13	Málaga	A	2–0
14	Valencia	H	0–1
15	Barcelona	H	1–2
16	Levante	A	1–1
17	Villarreal	H	2–2
18	Real Sociedad	A	2–0
19	Racing Santander	H	0–0

Match	Opponent	Venue	Result
20	Sevilla	H	0–2
21	Atlético Madrid	A	1–3
22	Real Zaragoza	H	2–1
23	Real Mallorca	A	1–2
24	Numancia	H	1–2
25	Espanyol	A	1–2
26	Osasuna	H	1–1
27	Athletic Bilbao	A	1–3
28	Deportivo La Coruña	H	0–1
29	Real Betis	A	1–2
30	Real Madrid	H	1–2
31	Getafe	A	0–1
32	Málaga	H	1–2
33	Valencia	A	0–2
34	Barcelona	A	0–2
35	Levante	H	3–1
36	Villarreal	A	0–1
37	Real Sociedad	H	2–2
38	Racing Santander	A	0–1

=== Copa del Rey ===
Win Draw Loss

Round	Opponent	Venue	Result
Round of 64	Ceuta	A	1–0 (a.e.t.)
Round of 32	Recreativo de Huelva	A	0–1 (a.e.t.)
