= 1998–99 CF Extremadura season =

CF Extremadura
1998–99 season
- Manager: Rafael Benítez
- La Liga: 17th (qualified for relegation play-off)
- Relegation play-off: Lost (relegated)
- Copa del Rey: Third round

== Season summary ==
Extremadura finished the season in 17th place. Although this was the club's highest-ever finish in the Spanish football pyramid (the season was only the second Extremadura had played in the top flight), they still finished one point adrift of safety. Extremadura thus qualified for the relegation play-off, where they faced the fifth-placed team of the Segunda División, Rayo Vallecano. The Madrid-based side easily defeated Extremadura 2-0 both home and away for a 4–0 aggregate win which saw Extremadura relegated after a single season in the top flight of Spanish football. Manager Rafael Benítez resigned after only two seasons in charge, deciding to instead study in Italy and England.

On the plus side, Extremadura won the Fair Play award.

== Squad ==
Squad at end of season

Note: Flags indicate national team as defined under FIFA eligibility rules; some limited exceptions apply. Players may hold more than one non-FIFA nationality.

No.	Pos.	Nation	Player
1	GK	ESP	Francisco Amador
4	DF	ESP	Félix
5	DF	CMR	Kalla
6	MF	ESP	Pedro José
7	FW	ESP	Manuel Mosquera
8	MF	FRA	Laurent Viaud
9	MF	ESP	Toni Velamazán
10	MF	ESP	Alberto Toril
11	MF	ESP	José Luis Soto
12	DF	ESP	Óscar Montiel
14	DF	ESP	David Belenguer

No.	Pos.	Nation	Player
16	DF	ESP	David Castedo (on loan from Mallorca)
17	DF	YUG	Miroslav Čermelj
18	FW	ARG	Alejandro Duré
19	DF	ESP	Juanito
20	DF	ESP	Poli
22	FW	ARG	Iván Gabrich
23	FW	CIV	Ahmed Ouattara
24	MF	SUI	Antonio Esposito (on loan from Grasshoppers)
25	GK	BEL	Ronny Gaspercic
26	GK	ESP	Manuel Jesuli
27	MF	ESP	Jesús Vázquez

=== Left club during season ===
Note: Flags indicate national team as defined under FIFA eligibility rules; some limited exceptions apply. Players may hold more than one non-FIFA nationality.

No.	Pos.	Nation	Player
3	DF	ESP	José Antonio Padilla (to Albacete)
8	MF	ESP	Ignacio Eraña (to Numancia)
15	MF	PER	Jean Ferrari (released)

No.	Pos.	Nation	Player
21	MF	SCG	Goran Bogdanović (to FK Sartid)
23	FW	ARG	Luis Rueda (on loan to Belgrano)

=== La Liga ===
==== League table ====
Pos	Team	Pld	W	D	L	GF	GA	GD	Pts	Qualification or relegation
15	Racing Santander	38	10	12	16	41	53	−12	42	
16	Alavés	38	11	7	20	36	63	−27	40	
17	Extremadura (R)	38	9	12	17	27	53	−26	39	Qualification for the relegation playoffs
18	Villarreal (R)	38	8	12	18	47	63	−16	36	Qualification for the relegation playoffs
19	Tenerife (R)	38	7	13	18	41	63	−22	34	Relegation to the Segunda División

Source: LFP
Rules for classification: 1) points; 2) head-to-head points; 3) head-to-head goal difference; 4) head-to-head goals scored; 5) goal difference; 6) number of goals scored.
(R) Relegated

== Transfers ==
=== In ===
==== Summer window ====
- (Spain) Toni Velamazán, from (Spain) Barcelona

On June 30 Barcelona accepted Extremadura's three-year offer for Velamazán after loaning him to Oviedo and Albacete in the two previous seasons. It kept a repurchase option for two years.

== See also ==
- CF Extremadura
- 1998–99 La Liga
- 1998–99 Copa del Rey
