= Raúl Valbuena =

Spanish footballer and manager

Personal information
- Full name: Raúl Valbuena Cano
- Date of birth: 23 April 1975 (age 51)
- Place of birth: Madrid, Spain
- Height: 1.94 m (6 ft 4 in)
- Position: Goalkeeper

Youth career
- 1986–1991: Leganés
- 1992–1994: Real Madrid

Senior career*
Years	Team	Apps	(Gls)
1991–1992	Leganés B		
1994–1995	Real Madrid C	27	(0)
1995–1998	Real Madrid B	60	(0)
1998–1999	Mallorca B	18	(0)
1999–2000	Toledo	26	(0)
2000–2002	Albacete	51	(0)
2002–2006	Zaragoza	13	(0)
2004–2005	→ Albacete (loan)	21	(0)
2006–2008	Albacete	30	(0)
Total		246	(0)

International career
1992	Spain U18	1	(0)
1992	Spain U19	2	(0)

Managerial career
- 2009–2015: Zaragoza (youth)
- 2015–2016: Sariñena
- * Club domestic league appearances and goals

Raúl Valbuena Cano (born 23 April 1975) is a Spanish retired footballer who played as a goalkeeper.

== Club career ==
Born in Madrid, Valbuena made his senior debut with CD Leganés' reserve team, aged only 16. In the 1992 off-season he joined Real Madrid's youth setup, and was promoted to the C-side in 1994.

In 1995, Valbuena was assigned to Real Madrid Castilla in Segunda División. He played his first match as a professional on 24 March 1996, starting in a 1–0 away win against CA Marbella.

Valbuena also suffered relegation in the 1996–97 season, and in summer 1998 he moved to another reserve team, RCD Mallorca B also in the second level. After splitting first-choice duties with Leo Franco, he signed for fellow league club CD Toledo in July 1999.

In 2000, Valbuena joined Albacete Balompié, appearing regularly during his two-year spell. On 6 June 2002 he moved to Real Zaragoza, but only appeared in one league match in an eventual top-flight promotion.

Valbuena made his La Liga debut on 21 September 2003, playing the full 90 minutes in a 0–3 away loss to Real Sociedad. He featured sparingly during the campaign, and was subsequently loaned to former side Albacete on 15 July 2004.

Valbuena was regularly used by the Castile-La Mancha-based team – only being limited due to injuries – which suffered relegation. On 1 May 2005, after starting in a 0–2 defeat at FC Barcelona, he suffered Lionel Messi's first league goal, the second of the match.

Valbuena returned to Zaragoza in 2005, where he notably played 25 minutes in the 2006 Copa del Rey Final 1–4 loss against RCD Espanyol, after replacing field player Delio Toledo due to César Sánchez's dismissal. He left the club the following year, and signed a three-year deal with Alba; he retired with the latter in 2008, at the age of 33.

== Career statistics ==
Appearances and goals by club, season and competition
Club	Season	League			National cup		Other		Total	
Club	Season	Division	Apps	Goals	Apps	Goals	Apps	Goals	Apps	Goals
Real Madrid B	1994–95	Segunda División	1	0	—		—		1	0
Real Madrid B	1996–97	Segunda División	17	0	—		—		17	0
Real Madrid B	1997–98	Segunda División B	36	0	—		6	0	42	0
Real Madrid B	Total		54	0	—		6	0	60	0
Mallorca B	1998–99	Segunda División	18	0	—		—		18	0
Toledo	1999–2000	Segunda División	26	0	2	0	—		28	0
Albacete	2000–01	Segunda División	14	0	1	0	—		15	0
Albacete	2001–02	Segunda División	37	0	1	0	—		38	0
Albacete	Total		51	0	2	0	—		53	0
Zaragoza	2002–03	Segunda División	1	0	1	0	—		2	0
Zaragoza	2003–04	La Liga	7	0	0	0	—		7	0
Zaragoza	2005–06	La Liga	5	0	2	0	—		7	0
Zaragoza	Total		13	0	3	0	—		16	0
Albacete (loan)	2004–05	La Liga	21	0	0	0	—		21	0
Albacete	2006–07	Segunda División	21	0	0	0	—		21	0
Albacete	2007–08	Segunda División	9	0	1	0	—		10	0
Albacete	Total		30	0	1	0	—		31	0
Career total			213	0	8	0	6	0	227	0
