= Casto (footballer) =

Spanish footballer (born 1982)

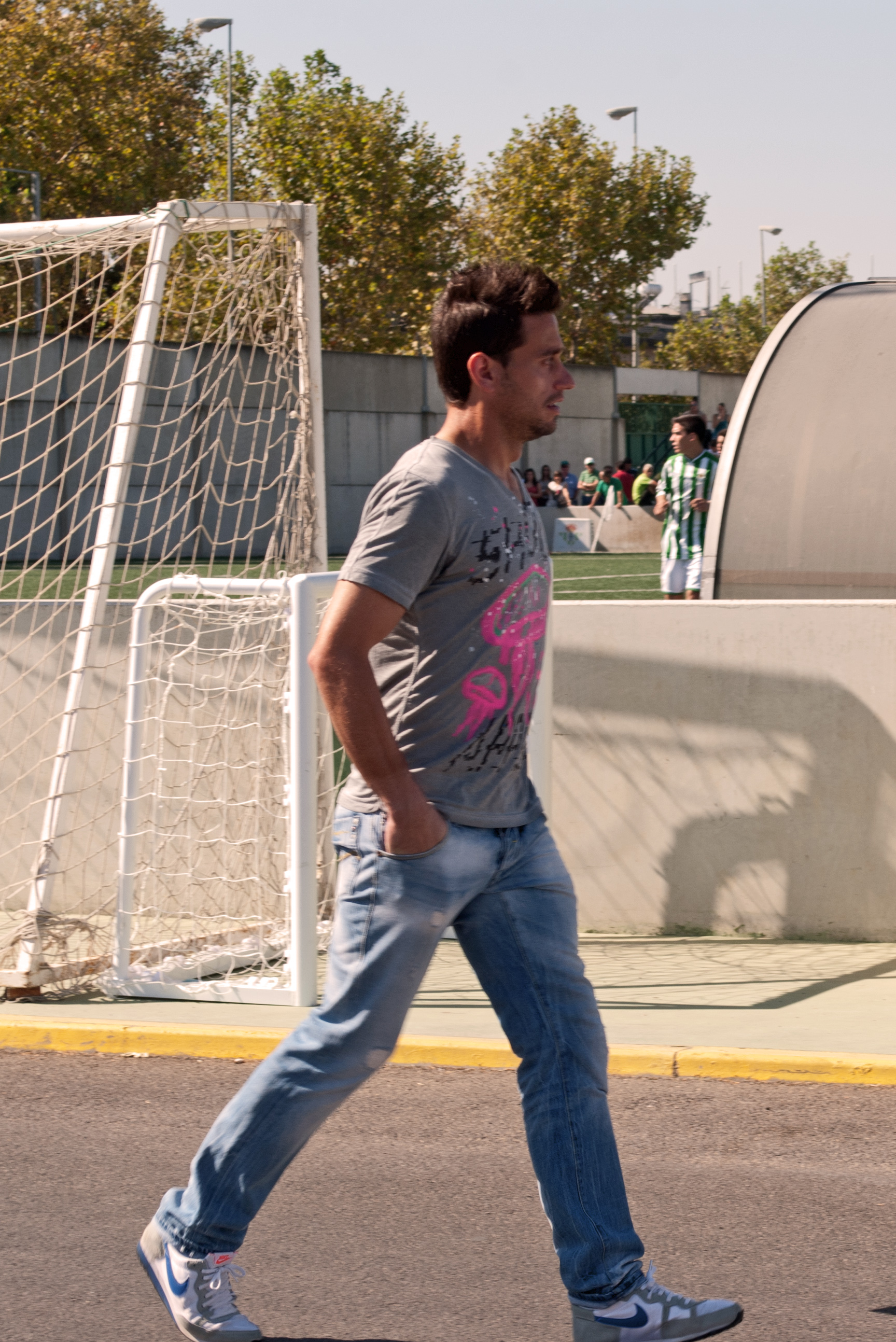
- Casto as a Betis player in 2011

Personal information
- Full name: Casto Espinosa Barriga
- Date of birth: 18 June 1982 (age 44)
- Place of birth: Pueblonuevo, Spain
- Height: 1.82 m (6 ft 0 in)
- Position: Goalkeeper

Youth career
- Pueblonuevo
- 1999–2001: Mérida

Senior career*
Years	Team	Apps	(Gls)
2001–2003	Mérida	6	(0)
2003–2004	Logroñés	0	(0)
2004–2006	Albacete B		
2006	Albacete	1	(0)
2006–2007	Betis B	13	(0)
2007–2013	Betis	71	(0)
2013–2014	Murcia	41	(0)
2014–2015	Las Palmas	30	(0)
2015–2017	Almería	77	(0)
2017–2018	Alcorcón	39	(0)
2018–2022	Extremadura	91	(0)
Total		369	(0)
- * Club domestic league appearances and goals

Casto Espinosa Barriga (born 18 June 1982), known simply as Casto, is a Spanish former professional footballer who played as a goalkeeper.

== Club career ==
Born in Pueblonuevo del Guadiana, Province of Badajoz, Extremadura, Casto spent four years at local Mérida (formative years included), making seven league appearances for the seniors in the Segunda División B. In 2003, he moved to Logroñés where he played one season before joining Albacete of Segunda División, featuring in one match for the first team in 2005–06.

Casto signed with Real Betis in the summer of 2006, where he initially began as third-choice behind Pedro Contreras and Toni Doblas. With the arrival of Portuguese international Ricardo in the following campaign, it seemed as though he would be provided with little opportunity to shine, even with Contreras' departure. However, after a serious injury to Doblas, he was called up from the reserves; after Ricardo also went down with a minor ailment, he made his debut in La Liga on 16 December 2007, in a 3–1 home win against Almería.

In March and April 2008 Casto, who eventually overtook Ricardo as starter after the latter's recovery, featured in Betis' first three back-to-back victories in over two years, with wins over Osasuna, Barcelona and Real Zaragoza. In his first five games his team won four, with the player keeping clean sheets in three.

As coach, Paco Chaparro stayed on the bench for 2008–09 and Casto won the battle for first-choice over Ricardo, being the undisputed starter during the early stages, a situation which would revert midway through the season. He started often after Ricardo's departure to Leicester City, only being overtaken by Adrián in 2012–13.

Casto left the Verdiblancos after his contract expired, and resumed his career in the second tier, representing Real Murcia, Las Palmas, Almería, Alcorcón and Extremadura. With the latter side, he spent the first half of the 2018–19 campaign unregistered as they had surpassed the agreed salary cap.

With Extremadura back in division three, Casto was released in January 2022 due to the club's severe financial problems. The following month, the 39-year-old announced his retirement.

== Career statistics ==
Appearances and goals by club, season and competition
Club	Season	League			National Cup		Other		Total	
Club	Season	Division	Apps	Goals	Apps	Goals	Apps	Goals	Apps	Goals
Mérida	2001–02	Segunda División B	3	0	0	0	1 (Note: Appearances in promotion playoffs)	0	4	0
Mérida	2002–03	Segunda División B	3	0	1	0	—		4	0
Mérida	Total		6	0	1	0	1	0	8	0
Logroñés	2003–04	Segunda División B	0	0	0	0	—		0	0
Albacete	2004–05	La Liga	0	0	0	0	—		0	0
Albacete	2005–06	Segunda División	1	0	0	0	—		1	0
Albacete	Total		1	0	0	0	—		1	0
Betis	2006–07	La Liga	0	0	0	0	—		0	0
Betis	2007–08	La Liga	9	0	4	0	—		13	0
Betis	2008–09	La Liga	18	0	0	0	—		18	0
Betis	2009–10	Segunda División	0	0	1	0	—		1	0
Betis	2010–11	Segunda División	17	0	6	0	—		23	0
Betis	2011–12	La Liga	22	0	0	0	—		22	0
Betis	2012–13	La Liga	5	0	6	0	—		11	0
Betis	Total		71	0	17	0	—		88	0
Murcia	2013–14	Segunda División	41	0	0	0	2	0	43	0
Las Palmas	2014–15	Segunda División	30	0	1	0	1	0	32	0
Almería	2015–16	Segunda División	36	0	0	0	—		36	0
Almería	2016–17	Segunda División	41	0	0	0	—		41	0
Almería	Total		77	0	0	0	—		77	0
Alcorcón	2017–18	Segunda División	39	0	0	0	—		39	0
Extremadura	2018–19	Segunda División	17	0	0	0	—		17	0
Extremadura	2019–20	Segunda División	38	0	0	0	—		38	0
Extremadura	2020–21	Segunda División B	19	0	1	0	—		20	0
Extremadura	Total		74	0	1	0	—		75	0
Career total			352	0	20	0	4	0	376	0

== Honours ==
Betis

- Segunda División: 2010–11
