= Morcillo (surname) =

Morcillo is a surname. Notable people with the surname include:

- Ángel Moreno Morcillo (born 1997), Spanish footballer
- Diego Morcillo Rubio de Auñón (1642–1730), Spanish bishop
- Jon Morcillo (born 1998), Spanish footballer
- Jorge Morcillo (born 1986), Spanish footballer
- Sebastián Fox Morcillo (1526?-1559?), Spanish scholar and philosopher
