= 2003–04 La Liga =

73rd season of La Liga

La Liga
- Season: 2003–04
- Dates: 30 August 2003 – 23 May 2004
- Champions: Valencia; 6th title
- Relegated: Valladolid; Celta Vigo; Murcia
- Champions League: Valencia; Barcelona; Deportivo La Coruña; Real Madrid
- UEFA Cup: Athletic Bilbao; Sevilla; Zaragoza (as Copa del Rey winners)
- Intertoto Cup: Atlético Madrid; Villarreal
- Matches: 380
- Goals: 1,015 (2.67 per match)
- Top goalscorer: Ronaldo (24 goals)
- Biggest home win: Real Madrid 7–2 Valladolid (13 September 2003); Barcelona 5–0 Albacete (1 February 2004)
- Biggest away win: Málaga 1–6 Valencia (31 January 2004); Mallorca 0–5 Valencia (2 November 2003); Celta Vigo 0–5 Deportivo La Coruña (3 January 2004)
- Highest scoring: Real Madrid 7–2 Valladolid (13 September 2003); Villarreal 6–3 Racing Santander (15 February 2004)

The 2003–04 La Liga season was the 73rd since its establishment. It began on 30 August 2003, and concluded on 23 May 2004. Valencia were crowned champions for the sixth time in club history.

As of 2026, this is most recent season in which the title went to a team other than Barcelona, Real Madrid, and Atletico Madrid.

== Teams ==
Twenty teams competed in the league – the top seventeen teams from the previous season and the three teams promoted from the Segunda División. The promoted teams were Murcia, Zaragoza and Albacete, returning to the top flight after an absence of fourteen, one and seven years respectively. They replaced Recreativo, Alavés, and Rayo Vallecano after spending time in the top flight for one, five, and four years respectively.

▲ Promoted to 2003–04 La Liga	▼ Relegated from 2002–03 La Liga
Murcia; Zaragoza; Albacete	Recreativo; Alavés; Rayo Vallecano

Location of teams in La Liga 2003–04

Team	Stadium	Capacity
Albacete*	Carlos Belmonte	18,000
Athletic Bilbao	San Mamés	39,750
Atlético Madrid	Vicente Calderón	55,005
Barcelona	Camp Nou	98,772
Betis	Manuel Ruiz de Lopera	52,132
Celta de Vigo	Estadio Balaídos	32,500
Deportivo de La Coruña	Riazor	34,600
Espanyol	Estadi Olímpic Lluís Companys	55,926
Málaga	La Rosaleda	30,044
Mallorca	Son Moix	23,142
Murcia*	La Condomina	16,000
Osasuna	El Sadar	19,553
Racing de Santander	El Sardinero	22,400
Real Madrid	Santiago Bernabéu	80,354
Real Sociedad	Anoeta	32,200
Sevilla	Ramón Sánchez Pizjuán	45,500
Valencia	Mestalla	55,000
Valladolid	José Zorrilla	27,846
Villarreal	El Madrigal	23,000
Zaragoza*	La Romareda	34,596

(*) Promoted from Segunda División.

=== Personnel and sponsors ===
Team	Head Coach	Kit manufacturer	Shirt sponsor (front)	Shirt sponsor (back)	Shirt sponsor (sleeve)	Shorts sponsor
Albacete	(Spain) César Ferrando	Viator	IV Centenario Don Quijote de La Mancha	Caja Castilla-La Mancha/Arcos Cuchillos	None	Periódico El Pueblo de Albacete
Athletic Bilbao	(Spain) Ernesto Valverde	100% Athletic	Bizkaia (in UEFA matches)	None	None	None
Atlético Madrid	(Spain) Gregorio Manzano	Nike	Columbia Pictures	None	None	None
Barcelona	(Netherlands) Frank Rijkaard	Nike	None	None	Forum Barcelona 2004	None
Betis	(Spain) Víctor Fernández	Kappa	Andalucía/La Gitana/Font Lys Agua Mineral	Font Lys Agua Mineral	None	None
Celta de Vigo	(Spain) Ramón Carnero	Umbro	Citroën	None	None	None
Deportivo de La Coruña	(Spain) Javier Irureta	Joma	Fadesa	None	None	None
Espanyol	(France) Luis Fernandez	Umbro	Conservas Dani	Interapuestas.com	Forum Barcelona 2004	Grup Tarradellas
Málaga	(Spain) Juande Ramos	Umbro	Unicaja	None	None	None
Mallorca	(Spain) Luis Aragonés	Reial	Spanair	None	None	Illes Balears
Murcia	(Wales) John Toshack	Nike	Cajamurcia/Polaris World	None	None	None
Osasuna	(Mexico) Javier Aguirre	Astore	Caja Navarra	None	None	None
Racing de Santander	(Spain) Lucas Alcaraz	Diadora	Organización Impulsora de Discapacitados	Cantabria	Cantabria	Santander
Real Madrid	(Portugal) Carlos Queiroz	Adidas	Siemens Mobile	None	None	None
Real Sociedad	(France) Raynald Denoueix	Astore	FIATC Seguros	NGS Europe	NGS Europe	FIATC Seguros, NGS Europe
Sevilla	(Spain) Joaquín Caparrós	Joma	Locco tu marca/La Gitana/Font Lys Agua Mineral	Locco tu marca/La Gitana/Font Lys Agua Mineral	Locco tu marca	Locco tu marca/La Gitana/Font Lys Agua Mineral
Valencia	(Spain) Rafael Benítez	Nike	Toyota	None	None	None
Valladolid	(Spain) Antonio Sánchez Santos	Umbro	Asómate a Valladolid/Grupo Helios/Banco Gallego/Castilla y León Cambia tus Vacaciones/Agroinnova	None	None	None
Villarreal	(Spain) Paquito García	Kelme	Terra Mitica/Aeroport Castelló	None	None	None
Zaragoza	(Spain) Víctor Muñoz	Lotto	Pikolin	None	None	None

== League table ==
Pos	Team	Pld	W	D	L	GF	GA	GD	Pts	Qualification or relegation
1	Valencia (C)	38	23	8	7	71	27	+44	77	Qualification for the Champions League group stage
2	Barcelona	38	21	9	8	63	39	+24	72	Qualification for the Champions League group stage
3	Deportivo La Coruña	38	21	8	9	60	34	+26	71	Qualification for the Champions League third qualifying round
4	Real Madrid	38	21	7	10	72	54	+18	70	Qualification for the Champions League third qualifying round
5	Athletic Bilbao	38	15	11	12	53	49	+4	56	Qualification for the UEFA Cup first round
6	Sevilla	38	15	10	13	56	45	+11	55 (Note: SEV 2–0 ATM; ATM 2–1 SEV)	Qualification for the UEFA Cup first round
7	Atlético Madrid	38	15	10	13	51	53	−2	55	Qualification for the Intertoto Cup third round
8	Villarreal	38	15	9	14	47	49	−2	54	Qualification for the Intertoto Cup second round
9	Real Betis	38	13	13	12	46	43	+3	52	
10	Málaga	38	15	6	17	50	55	−5	51 (Note: MLG 3–1 MLL; MLL 2–1 MLG)	
11	Mallorca	38	15	6	17	54	66	−12	51	
12	Zaragoza	38	13	9	16	46	55	−9	48 (Note: OSA 0–1 ZAR; ZAR 1–0 OSA)	Qualification for the UEFA Cup first round (Note: Zaragoza entered UEFA Cup as winners of 2003–04 Copa del Rey.)
13	Osasuna	38	11	15	12	38	37	+1	48	
14	Albacete	38	13	8	17	40	48	−8	47	
15	Real Sociedad	38	11	13	14	49	53	−4	46	
16	Espanyol	38	13	4	21	48	64	−16	43	
17	Racing Santander (Note: Racing Santander were docked one point deduction due to using foreign players exceeds the quota during a match against Osasuna on 14 December 2003.)	38	11	10	17	48	63	−15	42	
18	Valladolid (R)	38	10	11	17	46	56	−10	41	Relegation to the Segunda División
19	Celta Vigo (R)	38	9	12	17	48	68	−20	39	Relegation to the Segunda División
20	Murcia (R)	38	5	11	22	29	57	−28	26	Relegation to the Segunda División

Source: LFP
Rules for classification: 1st points; 2nd head-to-head points; 3rd head-to-head goal difference; 4th head-to-head goals scored; 5th goal difference; 6th number of goals scored; 7th Fair-play points
(C) Champions; (R) Relegated

== Results ==
Home \ Away	ALB	ATH	ATM	FCB	BET	CEL	RCD	ESP	MCF	MLL	MUR	OSA	RAC	RMA	RSO	SFC	VCF	VLD	VIL	ZAR
Albacete		1–1	1–1	1–2	1–0	0–2	0–2	2–1	0–1	2–0	1–0	0–2	4–0	1–2	3–1	1–4	0–1	2–0	2–0	3–1
Athletic Bilbao	1–1		3–4	0–1	1–1	0–0	1–0	1–0	2–1	4–0	2–1	1–1	1–2	4–2	1–0	2–1	1–1	1–4	2–0	4–0
Atlético Madrid	1–0	3–0		0–0	2–1	3–2	0–0	2–0	2–0	2–1	1–1	1–1	2–2	1–2	4–0	2–1	0–3	2–1	1–0	1–2
Barcelona	5–0	1–1	3–1		2–1	1–1	0–2	4–1	3–0	3–2	3–0	1–1	1–0	1–2	1–0	1–1	0–1	0–0	0–0	3–0
Betis	3–2	1–1	1–2	1–1		1–0	0–0	2–2	3–0	0–2	1–1	1–1	0–0	1–1	2–1	1–1	0–1	1–0	1–3	2–1
Celta de Vigo	2–2	0–2	2–2	1–0	0–2		0–5	1–5	0–2	1–2	1–1	1–0	0–1	0–2	2–5	0–0	0–2	3–2	2–1	0–2
Deportivo La Coruña	3–0	2–0	5–1	2–3	2–2	3–0		2–1	1–0	0–2	1–0	2–0	1–1	2–0	2–1	1–0	2–1	1–1	0–1	4–1
Espanyol	1–1	2–1	3–1	1–3	1–2	0–4	2–0		1–2	2–0	2–0	0–1	0–1	2–4	1–1	1–0	2–1	2–0	1–2	0–2
Málaga	1–1	2–1	3–1	5–1	2–3	2–1	1–1	5–2		3–1	1–0	0–0	1–0	1–3	1–2	2–0	1–6	2–3	0–0	2–1
Mallorca	0–0	1–3	0–1	1–3	2–1	2–4	4–2	4–2	2–1		4–1	1–1	1–1	1–3	1–1	1–1	0–5	1–0	1–2	2–0
Murcia	1–0	2–2	1–3	0–2	0–1	2–2	0–0	0–1	1–2	2–0		0–1	1–1	2–1	2–2	1–3	2–2	2–1	1–1	1–0
Osasuna	1–1	1–2	1–0	1–2	2–0	3–2	3–2	1–3	1–1	1–1	2–1		1–2	1–1	1–1	1–1	0–1	1–1	2–1	0–1
Racing Santander	0–2	1–2	2–2	3–0	1–2	4–4	0–1	0–1	4–2	2–1	3–2	0–0		1–1	0–1	0–4	0–3	1–0	0–2	1–2
Real Madrid	2–1	3–0	2–0	1–2	2–1	4–2	2–1	2–1	2–1	2–3	1–0	0–3	3–1		1–4	5–1	1–1	7–2	2–1	1–1
Real Sociedad	0–1	1–1	2–1	3–3	0–4	1–1	1–2	3–1	1–1	0–1	2–0	1–0	1–0	1–0		1–1	0–0	1–3	2–2	3–0
Sevilla	2–0	2–0	1–0	0–1	2–2	0–1	1–2	1–0	0–1	3–0	1–0	1–0	5–2	4–1	1–0		0–2	1–1	2–0	3–2
Valencia	0–1	2–1	3–0	0–1	2–0	2–2	3–0	4–0	1–0	5–1	2–0	0–1	1–2	2–0	2–2	1–0		1–1	4–2	3–2
Valladolid	2–0	2–0	3–1	1–3	0–0	0–2	1–1	3–1	1–0	1–3	0–0	1–1	0–4	2–3	2–2	2–0	0–0		3–0	1–2
Villarreal	2–1	0–1	0–0	2–1	1–0	1–1	0–2	0–1	2–0	0–2	1–0	1–0	6–3	1–1	2–0	3–3	2–1	3–1		1–1
Zaragoza	0–1	0–0	2–2	2–1	0–1	1–1	0–1	1–1	1–0	1–3	3–0	1–0	2–2	0–0	2–1	4–4	0–1	1–0	4–1	

Source: LFP
Legend: Blue = home team win; Yellow = draw; Red = away team win.

== Overall ==
- Most wins – Valencia (23)
- Fewest wins – Murcia (5)
- Most draws – Osasuna (15)
- Fewest draws – Espanyol (4)
- Most losses – Murcia (22)
- Fewest losses – Valencia (7)
- Most goals scored – Real Madrid (72)
- Fewest goals scored – Murcia (29)
- Most goals conceded – Celta de Vigo (68)
- Fewest goals conceded – Valencia (27)

== Awards ==
=== Individual Awards ===
Individual Awards
Award	Recipient	Club
Pichichi Trophy	(Brazil) Ronaldo	Real Madrid
Zamora Trophy	(Spain) Santiago Cañizares	Valencia CF
Trofeo EFE	(Brazil) Ronaldinho	FC Barcelona
Don Balón Spanish Player of the Year	(Spain) Vicente Rodríguez	Valencia CF
Don Balón Foreign Player of the Year	(Brazil) Ronaldinho	FC Barcelona
Don Balón Young Player of the Year	(Brazil) Júlio Baptista	Sevilla FC
Don Balón Coach of the Year	(Spain) Javier Irureta	Deportivo de La Coruña
Don Balón Referee of the Year	(Spain) César Muñiz Fernández	—
Guruceta Trophy	(Spain) Manuel Mejuto González	—

==== Team of the Season ====

La Liga Team of the Season 2003–04
Goalkeeper	(Spain) Santiago Cañizares (Valencia)			
Defenders	(Brazil) Roberto Carlos (Real Madrid)	(Portugal) Jorge Andrade (Deportivo La Coruña)	(Argentina) Roberto Ayala (Valencia)	(Spain) Míchel Salgado (Real Madrid)
Midfielders	(Portugal) Luís Figo (Real Madrid)	(France) Zinedine Zidane (Real Madrid)	(Spain) Víctor Sánchez del Amo (Deportivo La Coruña)	(Spain) Joaquín (Real Betis)
Forwards	(Brazil) Ronaldo (Real Madrid)		(Argentina) Javier Saviola (Barcelona)	

=== Pichichi Trophy ===
The Pichichi Trophy is awarded to the player who scores the most goals in a season.

Rank	Player	Club	Goals
1	(Brazil) Ronaldo	Real Madrid	24
2	(Brazil) Júlio Baptista	Sevilla	20
3	(Spain) Mista	Valencia	19
3	(Spain) Raúl Tamudo	Espanyol	19
3	(Spain) Fernando Torres	Atlético Madrid	19
6	(Spain) Salva	Málaga	18
7	(Cameroon) Samuel Eto'o	Mallorca	17
7	(Spain) David Villa	Zaragoza	17

=== Fair Play award ===
Valencia was the winner of the Fair-play award with 99 points.

=== Pedro Zaballa award ===
Joan Laporta (Barcelona president) and José María Alanís (CD Siempre Alegres footballer)

=== Hat-tricks ===
Player	Club	Against	Result	Date
(Spain) Raúl	Real Madrid	Valladolid	7–2 (H)	13 September 2003
(Brazil) Ricardo Oliveira	Valencia	Mallorca	5–0 (A)	2 November 2003
(Spain) Salva	Málaga	Barcelona	5–1 (H)	3 December 2003
(Spain) Víctor	Deportivo La Coruna	Celta Vigo	5–0 (A)	3 January 2004
(Spain) Javi Guerrero	Racing Santander	Murcia	3–2 (H)	25 January 2004
(Brazil) Ricardo Oliveira	Valencia	Málaga	6–1 (A)	31 January 2004
(Brazil) Júlio Baptista	Sevilla	Murcia	3–1 (A)	14 February 2004
(Spain) Mista	Valencia	Mallorca	5–1 (H)	21 March 2004
(Brazil) Júlio Baptista^{4}	Sevilla	Racing Santander	5–2 (H)	18 April 2004
(Spain) David Villa^{4}	Zaragoza	Sevilla	4–4 (H)	25 April 2004

- ^{4} Player scored 4 goals

== Attendances ==
FC Barcelona drew the highest average home attendance in the 2003-04 edition of La Liga.

#	Football club	Home games	Average attendance
1	FC Barcelona	19	73,624
2	Real Madrid	19	70,231
3	Valencia CF	19	47,058
4	Atlético de Madrid	19	45,208
5	Sevilla FC	19	36,006
6	Real Betis	19	34,959
7	Athletic Club de Bilbao	19	32,400
8	Real Zaragoza	19	30,153
9	RCD Espanyol	19	26,871
10	Real Sociedad	19	26,158
11	Deportivo de La Coruña	19	25,921
12	Málaga CF	19	21,603
13	Celta de Vigo	19	20,274
14	RCD Mallorca	19	16,018
15	Villarreal CF	19	15,394
16	Osasuna	19	15,368
17	Albacete Balompié	19	14,919
18	Real Valladolid	19	14,861
19	Racing de Santander	19	14,312
20	Real Murcia	19	11,720

== See also ==
- 2003–04 Segunda División
- 2003–04 Copa del Rey
