= Don Balón Award =

Award of Spanish sports magazine Don Balón from 1976 to 2010

From 1976 until 2010, the Spanish sports magazine Don Balón conferred the Don Balón Award (Premio Don Balón) to the best Spanish player, the best foreign player, the best referee and the breakthrough player in La Liga. These awards ceased to exist after the closure of the magazine in 2011.

== Winners ==
Season	Best Spanish player	Best foreign player	Best breakthrough player	Best coach	Best referee
1975–76	Miguel Ángel (Real Madrid)	(Netherlands) Johan Neeskens (Barcelona)	–	(Socialist Federal Republic of Yugoslavia) Miljan Miljanić (Real Madrid)	–
1976–77	Juanito (Burgos)	(Netherlands) Johan Cruyff (Barcelona)	–	(Spain) Luis Aragonés (Atlético Madrid)	–
1977–78	Migueli (Barcelona)	(Netherlands) Johan Cruyff (Barcelona)	–	(Spain) Luis Molowny (Real Madrid)	–
1978–79	Quini (Sporting Gijón)	(Germany) Uli Stielike (Real Madrid)	–	(Spain) Luis Molowny (Real Madrid)	–
1979–80	Rafael Gordillo (Real Betis)	(Germany) Uli Stielike (Real Madrid)	–	(Spain) Luis Molowny (Real Madrid)	–
1980–81	Urruti (Espanyol)	(Germany) Uli Stielike (Real Madrid)	–	(Spain) Alberto Ormaetxea (Real Sociedad)	–
1981–82	Miguel Tendillo (Valencia)	(Germany) Uli Stielike (Real Madrid)	–	(Spain) Alberto Ormaetxea (Real Sociedad)	–
1982–83	Juan Señor (Zaragoza)	(Argentina) Juan Barbas (Zaragoza)	–	(Spain) Javier Clemente (Athletic Bilbao)	–
1983–84	Manuel Cervantes (Murcia)	(Argentina) Juan Barbas (Zaragoza)	–	(Spain) Javier Clemente (Athletic Bilbao)	–
1984–85	Migueli (Barcelona)	(Germany) Bernd Schuster (Barcelona)	–	(England) Terry Venables (Barcelona)	–
1985–86	Míchel (Real Madrid)	(Argentina) Jorge Valdano (Real Madrid)	(Spain) Juan Carlos (Valladolid)	(Spain) Luis Molowny (Real Madrid)	Emilio Carlos Guruceta
1986–87	Andoni Zubizarreta (Barcelona)	(Mexico) Hugo Sánchez (Real Madrid)	(Spain) Ernesto Valverde (Espanyol)	(Spain) Javier Clemente (Espanyol)	Emilio Carlos Guruceta
1987–88	Juan Antonio Larrañaga (Real Sociedad)	(Brazil) Alemão (Atlético Madrid)	(Spain) Sebastián Losada (Espanyol)	(Netherlands) Leo Beenhakker (Real Madrid)	Emilio Soriano Aladrén
1988–89	Fernando (Valencia)	(Argentina) Oscar Ruggeri (Logroñés)	(Spain) Luis Milla (Barcelona)	(Wales) John Toshack (Real Sociedad)	Victoriano Sánchez Arminio
1989–90	Rafael Martín Vázquez (Real Madrid)	(Mexico) Hugo Sánchez (Real Madrid)	(Spain) Pedro (Logroñés)	(Wales) John Toshack (Real Madrid)	Emilio Soriano Aladrén
1990–91	Andoni Goikoetxea (Barcelona)	(Germany) Bernd Schuster (Atlético Madrid)	(Spain) Luis Enrique (Sporting Gijón)	(Netherlands) Johan Cruyff (Barcelona)	Ildefonso Urízar Azpitarte
1991–92	Agustín Elduayen (Burgos)	(Denmark) Michael Laudrup (Barcelona)	(Spain) Delfí Geli (Albacete)	(Netherlands) Johan Cruyff (Barcelona)	Raúl García de Loza
1992–93	Fran (Deportivo La Coruña)	(Federal Republic of Yugoslavia) Miroslav Đukić (Deportivo La Coruña)	(Spain) Julen Guerrero (Athletic Bilbao)	(Spain) Arsenio Iglesias (Deportivo La Coruña)	Juan Andújar Oliver
1993–94	Julen Guerrero (Athletic Bilbao)	(Bulgaria) Hristo Stoichkov (Barcelona)	(Spain) Sergi Barjuán (Barcelona)	(Spain) Víctor Fernández (Zaragoza)	Antonio López Nieto
1994–95	José Amavisca (Real Madrid)	(Chile) Iván Zamorano (Real Madrid)	(Spain) Raúl (Real Madrid)	(Spain) Arsenio Iglesias (Deportivo La Coruña)	Arturo Daudén Ibáñez
1995–96	José Luis Caminero (Atlético Madrid)	(Federal Republic of Yugoslavia) Predrag Mijatović (Valencia)	(Spain) Iván de la Peña (Barcelona)	(Federal Republic of Yugoslavia) Radomir Antić (Atlético Madrid)	Antonio López Nieto
1996–97	Raúl (Real Madrid)	(Brazil) Ronaldo (Barcelona)	(Spain) Víctor (Valladolid)	(Argentina) Vicente Cantatore (Valladolid)	Manuel Mejuto González
1997–98	Alfonso (Real Betis)	(Brazil) Rivaldo (Barcelona)	(Spain) Albert Celades (Barcelona)	(Spain) Javier Irureta (Celta Vigo)	José María García-Aranda
1998–99	Raúl (Real Madrid)	(Portugal) Luís Figo (Barcelona)	(Spain) Xavi (Barcelona)	(Argentina) Héctor Cúper (Mallorca)	Manuel Mejuto González
1999–2000	Raúl (Real Madrid)	(Portugal) Luís Figo (Barcelona)	(Spain) Iker Casillas (Real Madrid)	(Spain) Javier Irureta (Deportivo La Coruña)	Antonio López Nieto
2000–01	Raúl (Real Madrid)	(Portugal) Luís Figo (Real Madrid)	(Spain) Carles Puyol (Barcelona)	(Spain) Mané (Alavés)	José María García-Aranda
2001–02	Raúl (Real Madrid)	(France) Zinedine Zidane (Real Madrid)	(Spain) Joaquín (Real Betis)	(Spain) Rafael Benítez (Valencia)	Antonio López Nieto
2002–03	Xabi Alonso (Real Sociedad)	(Turkey) Nihat Kahveci (Real Sociedad)	(Brazil) Thiago Motta (Barcelona)	(France) Raynald Denoueix (Real Sociedad)	Manuel Mejuto González
2003–04	Vicente (Valencia)	(Brazil) Ronaldinho (Barcelona)	(Brazil) Júlio Baptista (Sevilla)	(Spain) Javier Irureta (Deportivo La Coruña)	César Muñiz Fernández
2004–05	Xavi (Barcelona)	(Argentina) Juan Román Riquelme (Villarreal)	(Spain) Sergio Ramos (Sevilla)	(Netherlands) Frank Rijkaard (Barcelona)	Alberto Undiano Mallenco
2005–06	David Villa (Valencia)	(Brazil) Ronaldinho (Barcelona)	(Spain) Raúl Albiol (Valencia)	(Netherlands) Frank Rijkaard (Barcelona)	Manuel Mejuto González
2006–07	Santi Cazorla (Recreativo)	(Argentina) Lionel Messi (Barcelona)	(Spain) Alexis (Getafe)	(Spain) Juande Ramos (Sevilla)	Alberto Undiano Mallenco
2007–08	Marcos Senna (Villarreal)	(Argentina) Sergio Agüero (Atlético Madrid)	(Spain) Bojan (Barcelona)	(Spain) Gregorio Manzano (Mallorca)	Manuel Mejuto González
2008–09	Andrés Iniesta (Barcelona)	(Argentina) Lionel Messi (Barcelona)	(Spain) Gerard Piqué (Barcelona)	(Spain) Pep Guardiola (Barcelona)	Miguel Ángel Pérez Lasa
2009–10	Borja Valero (Mallorca)	(Argentina) Lionel Messi (Barcelona)	(Spain) Javi Martínez (Athletic Bilbao)	(Spain) Pep Guardiola (Barcelona)	Javier Turienzo Álvarez

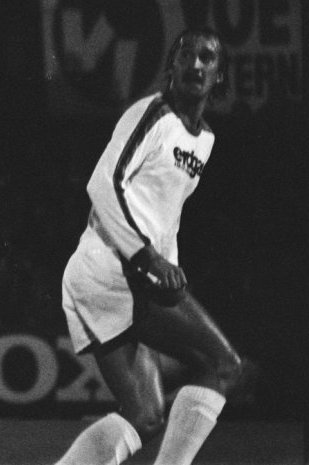
Uli Stielike is the foreign all-time record winner of the award with four wins.

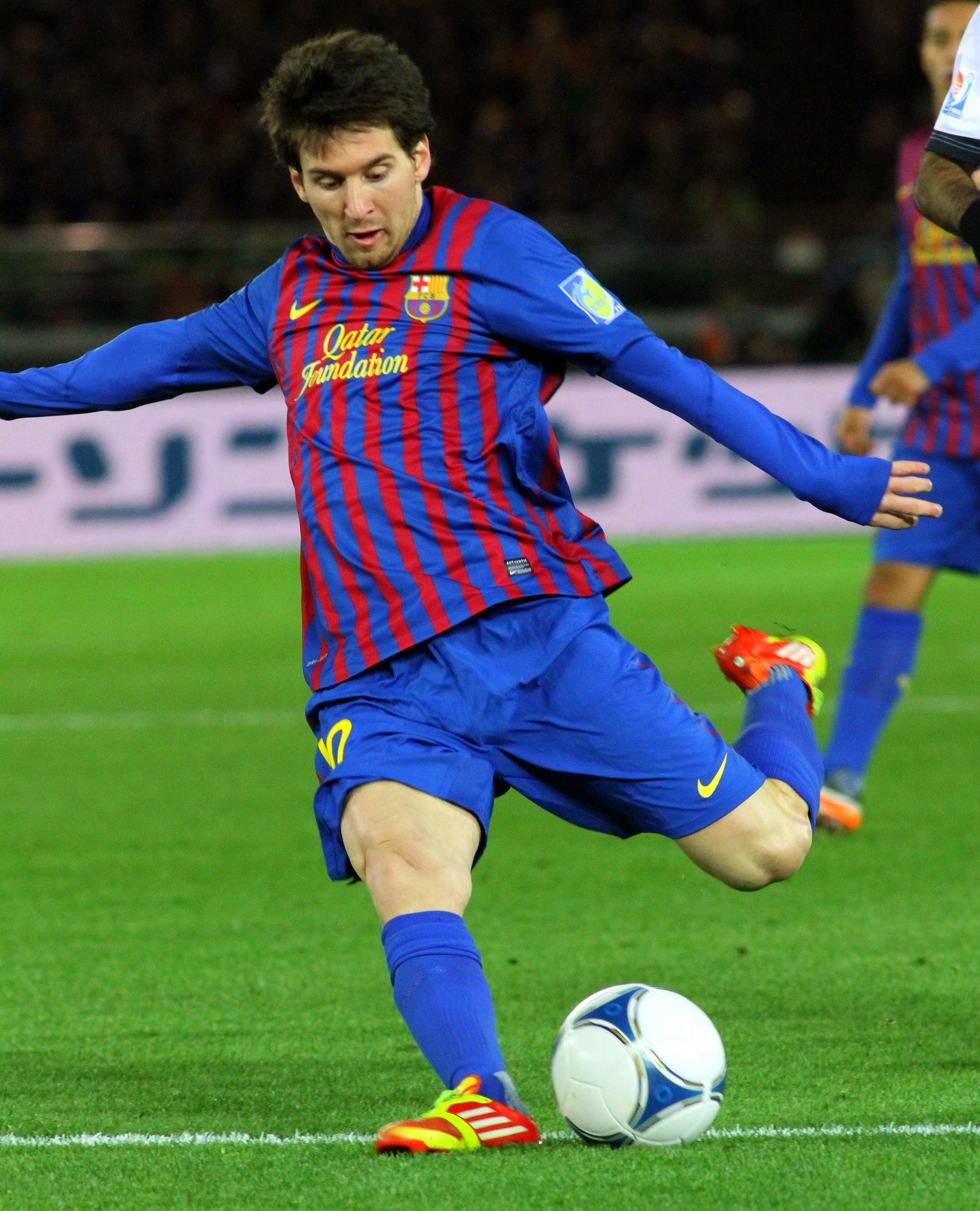
Lionel Messi was the last foreign winner, having won the award three times in total.

=== By foreign player (multiple) ===
Player	Titles	Seasons
(Germany) Uli Stielike	4	1978–79, 1979–80, 1980–81, 1981–82
(Portugal) Luís Figo	3	1998–99, 1999–2000, 2000–01
(Argentina) Lionel Messi	3	2006–07, 2008–09, 2009–10
(Netherlands) Johan Cruyff	2	1976–77, 1977–78
(Argentina) Juan Barbas	2	1982–83, 1983–84
(Mexico) Hugo Sánchez	2	1986–87, 1989–90
(Germany) Bernd Schuster	2	1984–85, 1990–91
(Brazil) Ronaldinho	2	2003–04, 2005–06

=== By Spanish player (multiple) ===
Player	Titles	Seasons
Raúl	5	1996–97, 1998–99, 1999–2000, 2000–01, 2001–02
Migueli	2	1977–78, 1984–85

=== By manager (multiple) ===
Manager	Titles	Seasons
(Spain) Luis Molowny	4	1977–78, 1978–79, 1979–80, 1985–86
(Spain) Javier Clemente	3	1982–83, 1983–84, 1986–87
(Spain) Javier Irureta	3	1997–98, 1999–2000, 2003–04
(Spain) Alberto Ormaetxea	2	1980–81, 1981–82
(Wales) John Toshack	2	1988–89, 1989–90
(Netherlands) Johan Cruyff	2	1990–91, 1991–92
(Spain) Arsenio Iglesias	2	1992–93, 1994–95
(Netherlands) Frank Rijkaard	2	2004–05, 2005–06
(Spain) Pep Guardiola	2	2008–09, 2009–10

== Team of the Decade (2000s) ==
(Published December 2010)

Goalkeeper	Defenders	Midfielders	Forwards
(Spain) Iker Casillas	(Spain) Carles Puyol (Argentina) Roberto Ayala (Brazil) Roberto Carlos	(Spain) Xavi (France) Zinedine Zidane (Brazil) Ronaldinho	(Argentina) Lionel Messi (Cameroon) Samuel Eto'o (Brazil) Ronaldo (Spain) Raúl

== Player of the Decade (2000s) ==
(Published December 2010)

Rank	Player	Votes
1	(France) Zinedine Zidane	27.7%
2	(Argentina) Lionel Messi	23.5%
3	(Brazil) Ronaldo	17.6%
4	(Spain) Xavi	15%
5	(Brazil) Ronaldinho	9%
6	(Spain) Iker Casillas	7.2%

== See also ==
- Don Balón
- LaLiga Awards
- Pichichi Trophy
- Zamora Trophy
- Zarra Trophy
- Trofeo Alfredo Di Stéfano
- Trofeo EFE
- Trofeo Aldo Rovira
- Miguel Muñoz Trophy
