= Don Balón =

Spanish sports magazine

- Editor-in-Chief: Juan Carlos Casas
- Categories: Sport
- Frequency: Weekly
- First issue: 7 October 1975
- Final issue: 2011 (print)
- Company: Editorial Don Balón, S.A.
- Country: Spain
- Based in: Barcelona
- Language: Spanish
- Website: www.donbalon.com

Don Balón is a Spanish weekly sports magazine specializing in Spanish and international football. The magazine was published in Barcelona between 1975 and 2011. It was distributed on five continents. Since 2011 Don Balón has been a fully digital media outlet. It is still considered one of the most influential football media outlets in the Spanish speaking world.

== History and profile ==
The magazine was founded in 1975 by José María Casanovas, a very well known Spanish sport journalist, who had the idea of creating an internationally recognized sport magazine. In the same year he also founded the daily sport newspaper Sport, which focuses on FC Barcelona. Don Balón had its headquarters in Barcelona. The magazine was published on a weekly basis, and was a member of the European Sports Magazines association along with similar publications World Soccer, Kicker, and A Bola.

Don Balón published special magazine supplements every year on La Liga and European competitions. In 1976 the magazine launched the Premio Don Balón (Don Balón Award) yearly to the best Spanish player, the best foreign player, the best coach, the best referee and the breakthrough player in La Liga. The magazine also produced an annual list of 100 young players, who they felt had huge potential, from across the world. When the magazine ceased publishing, In Bed with Maradona, an online football journal, continued this list. The magazine disappeared in September 2011 due to the economic crisis and the decline of revenues. Don Balon is now a fully digital sports media outlet run by new management.

== See also ==
- List of magazines in Spain
