= Bruno Lemiechevsky =

Uruguayan footballer (born 1994)

Personal information
- Full name: Bruno Mauricio Lemiechevsky Melessi
- Date of birth: 3 March 1994 (age 32)
- Place of birth: Montevideo, Uruguay
- Height: 1.88 m (6 ft 2 in)
- Position: Forward

Team information
- Current team: Tempio
- Number: 9

Senior career*
| Years | Team | Apps | (Gls) |
| 2013 | Cerdanyola del Vallès | | |
| 2013–2014 | Vilassar de Dalt | | |
| 2014–2015 | UD Molletense | | |
| 2015 | Vilassar de Mar | | |
| 2016–2017 | Slavia Mozyr | 38 | (6) |
| 2018 | Atlantas | 13 | (3) |
| 2019–2020 | Sant Julià | 18 | (9) |
| 2020–2021 | Inter Club d'Escaldes | 5 | (0) |
| 2021 | Villarrobledo | 18 | (3) |
| 2021–2022 | Santanyí | 37 | (10) |
| 2022–2023 | Li Punti | ? | (8) |
| 2023 | Calangianus | ? | (0) |
| 2024 | Li Punti | ? | (7) |
| 2024– | Tempio | ? | (14) |
- * Club domestic league appearances and goals as of 26 April 2025

Bruno Mauricio Lemiechevsky Melessi (Belarusian: Бруна Лемяшэўскі, born 3 March 1994), also known as Bruno Melessi, is a Uruguayan professional footballer who plays for Italian club Tempio.

== Career ==
Lemiechevsky spent his youth football years playing in lower Catalonia-based Spanish leagues. While visiting his relatives in Belarus in 2015, he was recruited by Slavia Mozyr and joined them officially in 2016.

From August 2018 he plays for Lithuanian club FK Atlantas Klaipėda in A lyga. In first match scored goal against FK Jonava.

On 2020 season he joined to Inter Club d'Escaldes.

ON 6 January 2021, Lemiechevsky signed for Spanish club CP Villarrobledo.

== Personal life ==
Due to having Belarusian ancestry, being born in Uruguay and having Spanish citizenship, he is eligible to represent Belarus, Spain and Uruguay.
