= Teo Tirado =

Spanish footballer

Teo
Personal information
- Full name: Teodoro José Tirado García
- Date of birth: 16 July 1985 (age 41)
- Place of birth: Madrid, Spain
- Height: 1.74 m (5 ft 8 1/2 in)
- Position: Winger

Youth career
- San Agustín
- SS Reyes
- 2002–2004: Villarreal

Senior career*
Years	Team	Apps	(Gls)
2004–2005	Villarreal B		
2005–2006	Valladolid B	33	(7)
2005–2007	Valladolid	7	(0)
2006–2007	→ Cartagena (loan)	24	(1)
2007–2008	Ponferradina	36	(6)
2008–2009	Águilas	20	(0)
2009–2010	Ponferradina	31	(2)
2011	Pontevedra	10	(1)
2011–2012	Orihuela	20	(3)
2012	Oviedo	11	(2)
2012–2014	Amorebieta	49	(1)
2014	Cacereño	11	(2)
2015	Ebro	11	(2)
2016	Selfoss	12	(4)
2016–2017	Hospitalet	37	(2)
2017–2019	Ebro	57	(1)
2019–2021	Villarrobledo	28	(1)
Total		397	(35)
- * Club domestic league appearances and goals

Teodoro José Tirado García (born 16 July 1985 in Madrid), commonly known as Teo, is a Spanish former professional footballer who played as a right or left winger.
