= Juan Barbas =

Argentine footballer

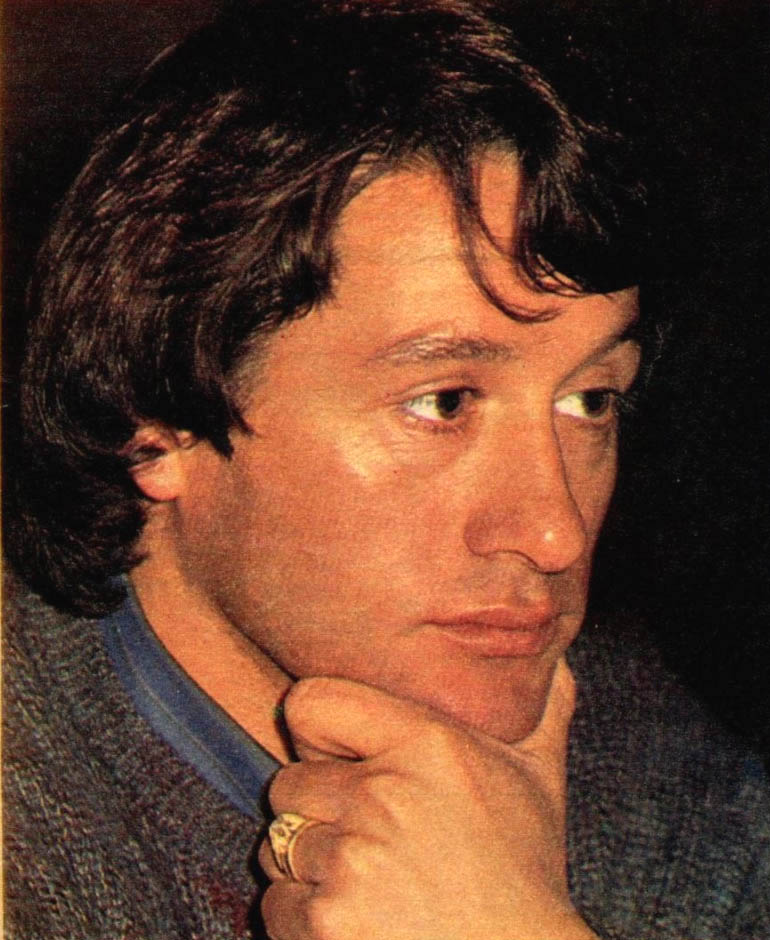
- Barbas in 1985

Personal information
- Full name: Juan Alberto Barbas
- Date of birth: 23 August 1959 (age 67)
- Place of birth: San Martín, Argentina
- Height: 1.67 m (5 ft 6 in)
- Position: Midfielder

Senior career*
Years	Team	Apps	(Gls)
1977–1981	Racing Club	132	(14)
1982–1985	Zaragoza	91	(19)
1985–1990	Lecce	149	(27)
1990–1991	FC Locarno		
1991–1992	FC Sion	11	(0)
1992–1993	FC Locarno		
1993/1994	Huracán	9	(0)
1993–1994	Alvarado		
1994–1997	All Boys	76	(9)

International career
1979	Argentina U20	10	(0)
1979–1985	Argentina	33	(0)

Managerial career
- 2009: Racing Club
- * Club domestic league appearances and goals

Juan Alberto Barbas (born 23 August 1959) is an Argentine former professional footballer who played as a midfielder. He played for a number of clubs in Argentina, Spain, Italy, and Switzerland before turning his hand to management in 2009 with Racing Club de Avellaneda.

== Club career ==
Barbas was born in San Martín, Buenos Aires. He started his career in 1977 at Racing Club de Avellaneda in the Argentine Primera División. He then went on to play for Zaragoza in Spain, Lecce in Italy, FC Locarno, and FC Sion in Switzerland.

Barbas was a part of the Sion team that won the 1991–92 Nationalliga A.

After another spell at Locarno, Barbas returned to Argentina where he had a short spell with Club Atlético Huracán before dropping down to the lower leagues to play for Alvarado de Mar del Plata and then All Boys, where he retired in 1997.

== International career ==
Barbas was part of the Argentina Under-20 squad that won the 1979 FIFA World Youth Championship, he went on to play for Argentina 33 times including appearances at the 1982 FIFA World Cup.

== Style of play ==
An offensive minded midfielder, with an eye for goal, Barbas's main traits as a footballer were his vision and striking ability from outside the area; he was also an experienced free kick taker.

== Coaching career ==
On 13 October 2009, Racing Club de Avellaneda officials hired their former player as their caretaker coach, replacing Ricardo Caruso Lombardi.

== Honours ==
Lecce

- Serie B runner-up: 1987–88

FC Sion

- Nationalliga A: 1991–92

Argentina U20

- FIFA World Youth Championship: 1979

Individual

- La Liga Foreign Player of the Year: 1982–83, 1983–84
