= Rubén Sánchez (footballer, born 1989) =

Spanish footballer

Personal information
- Full name: Rubén Sánchez García
- Date of birth: 21 January 1989 (age 37)
- Place of birth: Albacete, Spain
- Height: 1.81 m (5 ft 11 in)
- Position: Winger

Youth career
- Albacete

Senior career*
Years	Team	Apps	(Gls)
2007–2009	Villarreal C	41	(10)
2007–2009	Villarreal B	8	(0)
2009	→ Guadalajara (loan)	4	(0)
2009–2010	Valencia B	14	(1)
2010–2011	Valladolid B	32	(7)
2011–2012	Getafe B	14	(3)
2012–2013	Atlético B	2	(0)
2013–2014	Zamora	30	(3)
2014–2015	Murcia	29	(1)
2015	Compostela	10	(0)
2016	Mensajero	19	(6)
2016–2017	Melilla	16	(1)
2017	Lealtad	12	(0)
2017–2019	Sanse	33	(4)
2019–2021	Villarrobledo	41	(2)
2021–2024	Huracán Balazote	44	(8)
- * Club domestic league appearances and goals as of 7 April 2024

Rubén Sánchez García (born 21 January 1989) is a Spanish footballer who plays as a winger.

== Club career ==
Born in Albacete, Castile-La Mancha, Sánchez finished his youth career with local Albacete Balompié, and made his senior debuts with Villarreal CF's C-team in 2007–08, in Tercera División. During the season he also appeared with the reserves in Segunda División B and, on 2 February 2009, was loaned to CD Guadalajara also in the third level.

In the 2009 summer, Sánchez left the Valencians and signed with neighbouring Valencia CF Mestalla. One year later he joined another reserve team, Real Valladolid B, making his official debut with the main squad on 8 September 2010 by playing the entire second half of a 1–0 home success over SD Huesca for the campaign's Copa del Rey.

Sánchez competed in the third tier in the following years, representing Getafe CF B, Atlético Madrid B, Zamora CF, Real Murcia, SD Compostela, CD Mensajero and UD Melilla.
