= Martín Monteagudo =

Spanish footballer and coach

Personal information
- Full name: Martín Monteagudo Monteagudo
- Date of birth: 10 May 1963 (age 63)
- Place of birth: Tarazona de la Mancha, Spain
- Position: Midfielder

Senior career*
| Years | Team | Apps | (Gls) |
| 1979–1983 | Albacete | 122 | (15) |
| 1983–1984 | Córdoba | 30 | (1) |
| 1984–1986 | Gandía | | |
| 1986–1987 | Ontinyent | | |
| 1987–1988 | Sporting La Roda | | |
| 1988–1989 | Motilla | | |
| 1989–1990 | Campillo | | |
| 1990–1991 | Villarrobledo | | |
| 1991–1992 | Gimnástico Alcázar | 36 | (0) |
| 1992–1993 | Atlético Pedro Muñoz | | |
| 1993–1994 | Valdepeñas | | |

Managerial career
- 2000–2002: Quintanar del Rey
- 2003–2005: Albacete B
- 2005: Albacete
- 2008–2009: Albacete (assistant)
- * Club domestic league appearances and goals

Martín Monteagudo Monteagudo (born 10 May 1963) is a Spanish retired footballer who played as a midfielder, and later worked as a coach.

== Playing career ==
=== Albacete Balompié ===
Monteagudo was born in Tarazona de la Mancha, in the province of Albacete in the Autonomous community of Castile-La Mancha, and began his career in 1979 with local club Albacete Balompié, then in the Tercera División. They were promoted at the end of the 1981–82 season after a playoff victory against Talavera, and Monteagudo played a key role in their inaugural Segunda División B season.

He made his debut at this level in Albacete's third match of the season, playing the full 90 minutes of their 1–0 home loss to Alcalá on 19 September 1982 at the Estadio Carlos Belmonte. One of the highlights of his season was the home fixture against Badajoz on 17 October - he came off the bench with the score at 0–0, and netted the winner with six minutes to play.

Ultimately, he played 29 times that season as Albacete finished 3rd, only missing out on promotion to the Segunda División at the first attempt on goal difference. Despite this success, Albacete's final game of the season (a 2–0 home win over San Fernando on 22 May) would prove to be his last for the club.

=== Córdoba ===
For the 1983–84 season, Monteagudo joined Albacete's Segunda División B rivals Córdoba, who had just been relegated from the 1982–83 Segunda División. He made his debut for his new club on the opening day of the season, a 1–0 home win over Talavera at the Estadio El Arcángel on 4 September 1983.

He was an integral part of the team, playing in thirty matches and scoring one goal - after just three minutes in the 3–1 home win over Hospitalet on 25 March. However, it was not a successful season for either club or player. Personal low points for Monteagudo included receiving two red cards (away to Xerez on 4 December and Alcalá on 18 March) and scoring an own goal at El Arcángel against Antequerano on 8 April, while Córdoba finished the season in 19th and suffered a second successive relegation.

Córdoba did finish the season on a high note, with a 2–1 away win against Ibiza, but this would be Monteagudo's last match in the third tier as he left the club soon after.

=== Later career ===
His next club was Gandía, with whom he spent two season in the Tercera División. They were promoted at the end of the 1985–86 season, but Monteagudo departed before the new season began.

After leaving Gandía, he would play for eight clubs in eight years, all in either the Tercera División or the Primera Autonómica Preferente, the premier regional competition in Castilla-La Mancha. He had spells with Ontinyent, Sporting La Roda, Motilla, Campillo, Villarrobledo, Gimnástico Alcázar, Atlético Pedro Muñoz and Valdepeñas before retiring in 1994. In his last season, he helped Valdepeñas win promotion from the Primera Autonómica.

== Coaching career ==
After retirement, he returned to Albacete Balompié as a coach with the youth teams. He left in 2000 to become head coach of Quintanar del Rey in the Tercera División, and had a successful first season as they won their group, although they were unsuccessful in the promotion playoffs. After failing to match this success the following year, he returned to Albacete in 2002. In 2003, he was appointed head coach of Albacete B, the club's reserve team, in the Tercera División.

By February 2005, the fortunes of the reserve team were a stark contrast to their senior counterparts'. Monteagudo's reserves were top of their group in the Tercera División, while the senior team were struggling in La Liga. Following a 2–1 loss to bottom-of-the-table Numancia on 20 February, they dropped into the relegation zone, and the board of directors decided to dismiss head coach José González with immediate effect. Monteagudo was announced as his replacement, initially as caretaker manager.

Monteagudo's first match in charge was a 2–1 loss to Espanyol at Estadi Olímpic Lluís Companys on 26 February. The team took their first point under his management in his first home match, a 1–1 draw with Osasuna at Estadio Carlos Belmonte on 2 March. However, the team then went on a run of eight consecutive defeats, which they finally interrupted with a 3–1 home win over Levante on 8 May. This would prove to be his only victory as Albacete manager, and following the 1–0 loss to Villarreal at Estadio El Madrigal on 15 May, their relegation was confirmed with two matches to play. They finished the season with a 1–0 loss at El Sardinero against Racing Santander, which left them bottom of the table, and Monteagudo was replaced by César Ferrando before the new season began.

Monteagudo would return to Albacete once more, as assistant manager to Juan Ignacio Martínez, at the start of the 2008–09 Segunda División season. He left the club, at the same time as Martínez, in April 2009.

== Honours ==
=== Player ===
Albacete Balompié

- Tercera División: 1981–82

=== Manager ===
Quintanar del Rey

- Tercera División: 2000–01

== Career statistics ==
=== As a player ===
As of 26 December 2020

| Club | Season | League | | | Cup | | Other | | Total | |
| Club | Season | Division | Apps | Goals | Apps | Goals | Apps | Goals | Apps | Goals |
|---|---|---|---|---|---|---|---|---|---|---|
| Albacete | 1979–80 | Tercera División | 37 | 3 | 3 | 0 | — | | 40 | 3 |
| Albacete | 1980–81 | Tercera División | 29 | 8 | 1 | 0 | 2 | 0 | 32 | 8 |
| Albacete | 1981–82 | Tercera División | 27 | 3 | 2 | 1 | — | | 29 | 4 |
| Albacete | 1982–83 | Segunda División B | 29 | 1 | 2 | 0 | 5 | 1 | 36 | 2 |
| Albacete | Total | | 122 | 15 | 8 | 1 | 7 | 1 | 137 | 17 |
| Córdoba | 1983–84 | Segunda División B | 30 | 1 | 2 | 1 | 1 | 0 | 33 | 2 |
| Gimnástico Alcázar | 1991–92 | Tercera División | 36 | 0 | 6 | 0 | 6 | 0 | 48 | 0 |
| Career total | | | 188 | 16 | 16 | 2 | 14 | 1 | 218 | 19 |

1. Appearances in the 1983 Copa de la Liga Segunda División B
2. Appearances in the 1984 Copa de la Liga Segunda División B

=== As a manager ===
As of 26 December 2020

Managerial record by team and tenure
| Team | Nat | From | To | Record | | | | | | | |
| Team | Nat | From | To | G | W | D | L | GF | GA | GD | Win % |
|---|---|---|---|---|---|---|---|---|---|---|---|
| Albacete | (Spain) | 26 February 2005 | 16 June 2005 | 14 | 1 | 2 | 11 | 11 | 23 | −12 | 7.14 |
