= Ángel Pindado =

Spanish footballer and coach

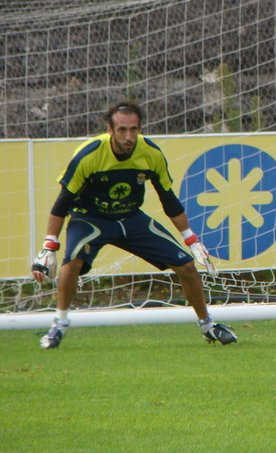
- Pindado training with Las Palmas in 2009

Personal information
- Full name: Ángel Javier Hernández Pindado
- Date of birth: 24 April 1976 (age 50)
- Place of birth: Ávila, Spain
- Height: 1.83 m (6 ft 0 in)
- Position: Goalkeeper

Senior career*
Years	Team	Apps	(Gls)
1997–1998	Águilas		
1998–2001	Granada	31	(0)
2001–2002	Atlético Madrid B	36	(0)
2002–2003	Getafe	32	(0)
2003–2004	Antwerp	1	(0)
2004–2005	Albacete	1	(0)
2005–2011	Las Palmas	90	(0)
2012	Nea Salamis	12	(0)
2012–2014	Ávila		
2014	Kastrioti	4	(0)
Total		207	(0)

Managerial career
- 2019: ATK (assistant)
- * Club domestic league appearances and goals

Ángel Javier Hernández Pindado (born 24 April 1976) is a Spanish former footballer who played as a goalkeeper, currently a goalkeeping coach.

He appeared in 92 Segunda División matches over six seasons, mainly at the service of Las Palmas. He also competed professionally in Belgium, Cyprus and Albania, in a 17-year career.

== Playing career ==
Pindado was born in Ávila, Castile and León. During his early career he represented Águilas CF, Granada CF, Atlético Madrid B, Getafe CF, Albacete Balompié and UD Las Palmas, also having an unassuming abroad spell with Belgium's Royal Antwerp F.C. in the 2003–04 season (one appearance, relegation from the First Division as last).

On 29 May 2005, in the closing round of the top-division campaign, Pindado played his only game in La Liga as Albacete were already relegated, a 1–0 away loss against Racing de Santander. With Las Palmas, he was the undisputed starter as the Canary Islands club was in the Segunda División B, but featured less in Segunda División; he did contribute 22 appearances in 2009–10, as Fabián Assmann dealt with some injury problems.

After only five competitive matches in the 2010–11 season where he conceded 18 goals, the 35-year-old Pindado was released by Las Palmas. He joined Nea Salamis Famagusta FC of Cyprus in the 2012 winter transfer window.

In January 2014, after nearly two years with his hometown side, Pindado signed with KS Kastrioti as a player–goalkeeping coach, becoming the first Spaniard in both capacities to compete in the Albanian Superliga.

== Coaching career ==
Pindado retired in June 2014 at the age of 38, immediately joining compatriot José Murcia's staff at PFC Levski Sofia. He subsequently worked as goalkeeper coach in Thailand (Ubon United FC, under Scott Cooper) and the Indian Super League (FC Pune City, ATK and Mohun Bagan, always under his compatriot Antonio López Habas).
