= Jesús Castellanos =

Spanish footballer (born 1978)

Personal information
- Full name: Jesús Antonio Castellanos Garrido
- Date of birth: 24 October 1978 (age 48)
- Place of birth: El Bonillo, Spain
- Height: 1.86 m (6 ft 1 in)
- Position: Centre-back

Youth career
- Albacete Balompié

Senior career*
Years	Team	Apps	(Gls)
1998–1999	Albacete B		
1999	→ Motril (loan)	15	(1)
1999–2000	Albacete	11	(0)
2000–2001	Linense	30	(3)
2001–2002	Motril	16	(0)
2002	Amurrio	11	(1)
2002–2003	Jerez	12	(0)
2003–2006	Lorca Deportiva	80	(2)
2006–2010	Jaén	146	(0)
2010–2012	Almansa	72	(3)
2012–2014	La Roda	61	(0)
Total		382	(7)

Managerial career
- 2014–2017: Almansa
- 2017–2018: La Roda
- 2018–2020: Villarrobledo
- 2021–2022: Huracán de Balazote
- * Club domestic league appearances and goals

Jesús Antonio Castellanos Garrido (born 24 October 1978) is a Spanish retired footballer who played as a central defender and manager.

== Club career ==
Born in El Bonillo, Castile-La Mancha, Castellanos was a youth product of local Albacete Balompié. After featuring with the reserves and being loaned to lowly Motril CF in his beginnings as a senior, he made his professional debut on 22 August 1999, playing the last 12 minutes in a 3–1 home win over SD Eibar in the Segunda División.

In the following years, Castellanos competed in the Segunda División B and Tercera División, representing Real Balompédica Linense, Motril, Amurrio Club, Jerez CF, Lorca Deportiva (also appearing in the second level in the 2005–06 season), Real Jaén, UD Almansa and La Roda CF.
