= Francisco Amador =

Spanish footballer

Personal information
- Full name: Francisco Rodríguez Amador
- Date of birth: 13 December 1968 (age 57)
- Place of birth: Madrid, Spain
- Height: 1.81 m (5 ft 11 1/2 in)
- Position: Goalkeeper

Senior career*
| Years | Team | Apps | (Gls) |
| 1990–1991 | Extremadura | 6 | (0) |
| 1991–1992 | Cacereño | | |
| 1992–1993 | Alcalá | 34 | (0) |
| 1993–1999 | Extremadura | 176 | (0) |
| 1999–2001 | Las Palmas | 12 | (0) |
| 2001–2002 | Extremadura | 0 | (0) |
| 2004–2006 | Móstoles | 10 | (0) |
| Total | | 238 | (0) |
- * Club domestic league appearances and goals

Francisco Rodríguez Amador (born 13 December 1968) is a Spanish former professional footballer who played as a goalkeeper.

He appeared in 27 La Liga matches over three seasons with Extremadura and Las Palmas.

== Club career ==
Born in the Spanish capital Madrid, Amador began his professional career with Extremadura. After making six appearances during their 1990–91 Segunda División B campaign, he spent the following season with Cacereño, helping them to promotion from the Tercera División. For 1992–93, he joined Alcalá and experienced the opposite fate as they were relegated from the third tier, with Amador making 34 appearances.

Amador rejoined Extremadura in 1993, where he would settle for the next six seasons. He was their first choice goalkeeper for the first three of these, which were successful years for the club. They were promoted as Segunda División B champions in his first season, and earned another promotion two years later. This meant Extremadura would play in La Liga, the top tier of Spanish football, for the first time in their history. Amador kept a clean sheet in the decisive play-off match against Albacete Balompié. Amador began this debut top flight campaign as first choice goalkeeper, but lost the position after the signing of Colombian keeper Carlos Navarro Montoya. Extremadura were ultimately relegated in 19th place.

Amador regained his position as first choice in 1997–98, making 41 appearances as Extremadura earned an immediate return to the top flight. However, the following year he was once again second choice, with Belgian Ronny Gaspercic preferred in goal. Extremadura were relegated once more, and Amador left the club at the end of the season, joining Las Palmas.

Amador helped Las Palmas to promotion in his first season, and was able to make one final La Liga appearance the following year. He rejoined Extremadura in 2001, and while he didn't make any league appearances that season, during which the club was relegated back to Segunda División B, he did play in the Copa del Rey. Amador's total of 213 Extremadura appearances across his three spells puts him fifth on the all-time list of appearances for the club.

Amador returned to football in 2004, spending two seasons with Mósteles. They were promoted from the Tercera División in the first, and relegated back again in the second. Amador retired from football in 2006 at the age of 37.

== Honours ==
Extremadura

- Segunda División B: 1993–94

Las Palmas

- Segunda División: 1999–2000
