= Félix (footballer, born 1968) =

Spanish footballer

Personal information
- Full name: Félix Carvallo Martínez
- Date of birth: 6 January 1968 (age 58)
- Place of birth: Olivenza, Spain
- Height: 1.78 m (5 ft 10 in)
- Position: Centre-back

Youth career
- –1983: Olivenza

Senior career*
Years	Team	Apps	(Gls)
1983–1986	Olivenza		
1986–2002	Extremadura	327	(14)
2002–2005	Levante	53	(5)
Total		380	(19)

Managerial career
- 2005–2006: Levante (youth)
- 2006–2008: Levante Femenino
- 2011: Ribarroja
- 2011–2012: Barrio del Cristo
- * Club domestic league appearances and goals

Félix Carvallo Martínez (born 6 January 1968), known as Félix, is a Spanish former professional footballer and manager who played as a centre-back.

He made over 350 appearances for Extremadura during a long spell with the club, including 46 in La Liga during their two seasons in the top flight in the late 1990s. He is third on the all-time appearances list for Extremadura, behind only forward Manuel Mosquera and midfielder Pedro José.

== Club career ==
Born in Olivenza in the autonomous community of Extremadura, Félix began his career at local side CP Olivenza, making his professional debut in the Tercera División aged just 15. As a youngster, he had to choose between a career in the construction industry or pursuing a football career. He moved to CF Extremadura in 1986, and was part of the team which won their Tercera División group and earned promotion in 1989–90.

Félix was a key player for Extremadura during each of their four seasons in Segunda División B, and helped them to another promotion, again as champions, in 1993–94. Two years later, they were promoted yet again from the 1995–96 Segunda División, and would play in La Liga, the top flight of Spanish football, for the first time in the club's history. Félix played only eleven games in 1996–97 La Liga season due to a persistent knee injury, and at the end of the year Extremadura were relegated.

Félix was once again a key player during 1997–98, as Extremadura won promotion and earned an immediate return to the top flight. He was more prominent during this second La Liga campaign, making 35 appearances and scoring twice, although Extremadura were once again relegated at the end of the season. Félix spent a further three years with the club in the Segunda División before experiencing another relegation in 2002. He left the club after sixteen seasons and over 350 appearances.

Félix then joined Segunda División side Levante, under the management of Carlos García Cantarero. He was one of a number of experienced players arriving at Levante that summer, along with FR Yugoslavia international Predrag Mijatović Argentine striker Gabriel Amato. Félix made 41 appearances in his first season at the club, scoring five goals, and although Levante were strong candidates for promotion, they ultimately fell short, leading to the dismissal of García Canterero.

The coach for 2003–04 was Manuel Preciado, and while Félix played a lesser role that year, playing only twelve games, Preciado guided Levante to promotion as Segunda División champions. However, Preciado was replaced ahead of the new season by German coach Bernd Schuster, who made it clear that Félix was not part of his plans. Félix decided to retire in 2005 at the age of 37, without having a made a top flight appearance for Levante.

== Coaching career ==
After retiring as a player, Félix remained associated with Levante as coach of their youth team, who he saved from relegation during his only season in charge. He was then appointed manager of Levante Femenino in July 2006, guiding them to Copa de la Reina success in his first season in charge, and to the Superliga Femenina title in his second. However, his contract was not renewed by the club in the summer of 2008.

He joined Ribarroja in 2011, with eight games left to play in their Tercera División campaign. Félix was able to save the club from relegation. The following season, he joined fellow Tercera División side Barrio del Cristo, leaving before the end of the season due to financial problems at the club.

== Honours ==
=== Player ===
Extremadura

- Segunda División B: 1993–94
- Tercera División: 1989–90

Levante

- Segunda División: 2003–04

=== Manager ===
Levante Femenino

- Superliga Femenina: 2007–08
- Copa de la Reina de Fútbol: 2007
