= CP Villarrobledo =

Spanish association football club

Villarrobledo
- Full name: Club Polideportivo Villarrobledo
- Nicknames: Villa, troyanos (trojans)
- Founded: 8 May 1971; 55 years ago
- Ground: N. Señora de la Caridad, Villarrobledo, Castile-La Mancha, Spain
- Capacity: 5,500
- President: Bernardo de la Cruz
- Head coach: Jesús Castellanos
- League: Tercera Federación – Group 18
- 2025–26: Tercera Federación – Group 18, 10th of 18
Home colours	Away colours

Club Polideportivo Villarrobledo is a Spanish football club based in Villarrobledo, Albacete, in the autonomous community of Castile-La Mancha. Founded in 1971 as a replacement for folded CD Villarrobledo, it currently plays in Tercera Federación – Group 18, holding home games at Estadio Nuestra Señora de la Caridad, with a 5,500-seat capacity.

== History ==
The club was founded on 8 May 1971 by José García Moya and other fans.

In the 2010–11 season Villarrobledo finished in 14th position, just 9 points away from being relegated from the Tercera División. In the 2018–19 season the club finished 3rd in Tercera División – Group 18, and was promoted to Segunda División B.

== Club background ==
- Club Deportivo Villarrobledo – (1956–68)
- Club Polideportivo Villarrobledo – (1971–)

== Season to season ==
Season	Tier	Division	Place	Copa del Rey
1973–74	6	2ª Reg.	12th	
1974–75	6	2ª Reg.	4th	
1975–76	5	1ª Reg.	9th	
1976–77	5	1ª Reg.	1st	
1977–78	5	Reg. Pref.	12th	
1978–79	5	Reg. Pref.	7th	
1979–80	5	Reg. Pref.	4th	
1980–81	4	3ª	11th	
1981–82	4	3ª	9th	
1982–83	4	3ª	5th	
1983–84	4	3ª	8th	
1984–85	4	3ª	5th	
1985–86	4	3ª	5th	First round
1986–87	4	3ª	10th	
1987–88	4	3ª	2nd	
1988–89	4	3ª	2nd	
1989–90	4	3ª	8th	
1990–91	4	3ª	6th	
1991–92	4	3ª	5th	First round
1992–93	4	3ª	16th	First round

Season	Tier	Division	Place	Copa del Rey
1993–94	4	3ª	3rd	
1994–95	4	3ª	5th	
1995–96	4	3ª	6th	
1996–97	4	3ª	3rd	
1997–98	4	3ª	6th	
1998–99	4	3ª	6th	
1999–2000	4	3ª	3rd	
2000–01	4	3ª	2nd	
2001–02	4	3ª	3rd	
2002–03	4	3ª	5th	
2003–04	4	3ª	8th	
2004–05	4	3ª	9th	
2005–06	4	3ª	7th	
2006–07	4	3ª	14th	
2007–08	4	3ª	2nd	
2008–09	4	3ª	17th	
2009–10	4	3ª	6th	
2010–11	4	3ª	14th	
2011–12	4	3ª	1st	
2012–13	4	3ª	6th	First round

Season	Tier	Division	Place	Copa del Rey
2013–14	4	3ª	3rd	
2014–15	4	3ª	9th	
2015–16	4	3ª	8th	
2016–17	4	3ª	3rd	
2017–18	4	3ª	2nd	
2018–19	4	3ª	3rd	
2019–20	3	2ª B	20th	
2020–21	3	2ª B	10th / 8th	
2021–22	5	3ª RFEF	4th	
2022–23	5	3ª Fed.	13th	
2023–24	5	3ª Fed.	12th	
2024–25	5	3ª Fed.	15th	
2025–26	5	3ª Fed.	10th	
2026–27	5	3ª Fed.		

- 2 seasons in Segunda División B
- 39 seasons in Tercera División
- 6 seasons in Tercera Federación/Tercera División RFEF

== Current squad ==
As of 14 April 2021

Note: Flags indicate national team as defined under FIFA eligibility rules; some limited exceptions apply. Players may hold more than one non-FIFA nationality.

No.	Pos.	Nation	Player
1	GK	ESP	Diego Nieves
2	DF	ESP	Pablo García (captain)
3	DF	ENG	George Lucas
4	DF	ESP	Fernando Navarro (on loan from Albacete B)
5	DF	ESP	Ángel Moreno
6	MF	ESP	Chato
7	FW	HAI	Mikaël Cantave
8	MF	ESP	Teo Tirado
9	FW	URU	Bruno Lemiechevsky
10	MF	CMR	Dani Ndi
11	FW	ESP	Diego Buitrago
12	MF	ESP	Juanma Justo

No.	Pos.	Nation	Player
13	GK	ESP	Albert Escuin
15	DF	ESP	José Carlos Márquez
16	MF	CHN	Li Jinqing (on loan from Shenzhen F.C.)
17	FW	ESP	Alejandro Jiménez
18	FW	HAI	Jean-Loubens Pierre
19	DF	ESP	Raúl Llorente
20	DF	ESP	Edu Latorre
21	FW	ESP	Rubén Sánchez
22	FW	ESP	Carmelo Merencia
25	GK	ESP	Jagoba Zárraga (on loan from Racing de Santander)
27	DF	ESP	Pepe García
—	MF	ARG	Gonzalo Miceli
