= Elías Molina =

Spanish footballer

Elías
Personal information
- Full name: Elías Molina-Prados García-Navas
- Date of birth: 16 February 1982 (age 44)
- Place of birth: Herencia, Spain
- Height: 1.84 m (6 ft 0 in)
- Position: Defensive midfielder

Youth career
- 1995–2001: Atlético Madrid

Senior career*
| Years | Team | Apps | (Gls) |
| 2000–2001 | Atlético Aviación | 11 | (0) |
| 2001–2002 | Numancia | 23 | (0) |
| 2002–2004 | Mallorca B | 29 | (1) |
| 2003 | → Logroñés (loan) | 10 | (0) |
| 2004–2005 | Albacete B | 28 | (4) |
| 2004–2005 | Albacete | 1 | (0) |
| 2005–2007 | Cartagena | 62 | (3) |
| 2007–2008 | Ponferradina | 36 | (0) |
| 2008–2009 | Lorca Deportiva | 29 | (2) |
| 2009–2011 | Conquense | 69 | (3) |
| 2011–2012 | Burgos | 25 | (0) |
| 2013 | Manzanares | 17 | (0) |
| 2013–2014 | Gimnástico Alcázar | 18 | (2) |
| 2014 | Manzanares | 16 | (2) |
| 2014–2015 | Cacereño | 33 | (1) |

International career
| 1998 | Spain U15 | 9 | (0) |
| 1998–1999 | Spain U16 | 10 | (1) |
| 1999 | Spain U17 | 2 | (0) |
| 2000–2001 | Spain U18 | 8 | (0) |
Medal record
Representing Spain
UEFA European Under-16 Championship
| Winner | 1999 Czech Republic |
- * Club domestic league appearances and goals as of June 2015

Elías Molina-Prados García-Navas (born 16 February 1982), simply known as Elías, is a Spanish former footballer. Mainly a defensive midfielder, he can also play as a central defender.

== Club career ==
Born in Herencia, Ciudad Real, Castilla-La Mancha, Elías joined Atlético Madrid's youth setup in 1995, aged 13. He made his senior debuts in the 2000–01 campaign with Atlético Aviación, the club's farm team.

In the 2001 summer Elías moved to CD Numancia in Segunda División. He played his first match as a professional on 26 August 2001, coming on as a second-half substitute in a 2–2 home draw against UD Salamanca.

After appearing in 23 matches in 2001–02, Elías was never utilized in the following season and moved to RCD Mallorca in January 2003, being assigned to the reserves in the third level. After a short loan stint at CD Logroñés, he moved to another reserve team, Albacete Balompié B in Tercera División.

On 26 February 2005 Elías made his first team – and La Liga – debut, starting in a 1–2 away loss against RCD Espanyol; it was his maiden appearance in the competition.

Elías resumed his career in the third and fourth levels in the following seasons, representing FC Cartagena, SD Ponferradina, Lorca Deportiva CF, UB Conquense, Burgos CF, Manzanares CF (two stints), CF Gimnástico Alcázar and CP Cacereño.

== International career ==
Elías played for Spain in all youth levels. He won the UEFA European Under-16 Football Championship in 1999, hosted in Czech Republic, and scored the last of a 4–1 routing against Poland in the tournament's final match.

Elías also appeared with the under-17's at the 1999 FIFA U-17 World Championship, hosted in New Zealand, and with the under-18's at the 2001 UEFA European Under-18 Championship.
