= Ángel Moreno (footballer) =

Spanish footballer

Personal information
- Full name: Ángel Moreno Morcillo
- Date of birth: 2 December 1997 (age 28)
- Place of birth: La Roda, Spain
- Height: 1.83 m (6 ft 0 in)
- Position: Defender

Team information
- Current team: Tarancón
- Number: 2

Youth career
- La Roda
- 2015–2016: Albacete

Senior career*
Years	Team	Apps	(Gls)
2015	La Roda	1	(0)
2016–2019	Albacete B	58	(5)
2016–2020	Albacete	9	(0)
2019–2020	→ Córdoba (loan)	6	(0)
2020	→ Cultural Leonesa (loan)	4	(0)
2020–2021	Quintanar Rey	6	(0)
2021	Villarrobledo	17	(0)
2021–2022	Socuellamos	14	(0)
2022–2023	Alcalá	16	(0)
2023–	Tarancón	31	(0)
- * Club domestic league appearances and goals as of 10 May 2024

Ángel Moreno Morcillo (born 2 December 1997) is a Spanish footballer who plays as either a central defender or a left back for CD Tarancón.

== Club career ==
Moreno was born in La Roda, Albacete, Castile-La Mancha, and was a La Roda CF youth graduate. On 1 February 2015, while still a youth, he made his first team debut by coming on as a half-time substitute in a 1–3 Segunda División B away loss against Real Betis B.

In July 2015 Moreno moved to Albacete Balompié, returning to youth football. He was promoted to the reserves in the Tercera División the following year, but made his first-team debut on 21 August 2016 by replacing Carlos Delgado in a 3–0 home win against Zamudio SD in the third division.

Moreno scored his first senior goal on 1 October 2016, netting the equalizer for the B-side in a 3–3 away draw against CD Azuqueca; late into the month, he extended his contract until 2020. The following march, he suffered a knee injury, and remained sidelined for seven months.

Moreno made his professional debut on 25 February 2018, again replacing Delgado in a 1–0 home win against CD Numancia in the Segunda División. The following 25 January, after being an ever-present figure in the B-side, he renewed his contract until 2021.

On 19 July 2019, Moreno was loaned to freshly relegated side Córdoba CF for one year. The following 31 January, after being rarely used, he moved to fellow third division side Cultural y Deportiva Leonesa also in a temporary deal.

On 24 September 2020, Moreno terminated his contract with Albacete, and signed for fourth division side CD Quintanar del Rey exactly one month later.

Moreno moved to CP Villarrobledo on 14 January 2021, before joining Segunda División RFEF side UD Socuéllamos on 27 July.
