= 2004–05 La Liga =

74th season of La Liga

La Liga
- Season: 2004–05
- Dates: 28 August 2004 – 29 May 2005
- Champions: Barcelona; 17th title
- Relegated: Levante; Numancia; Albacete
- Champions League: Barcelona; Real Madrid; Villarreal; Real Betis
- UEFA Cup: Espanyol; Sevilla; Osasuna (as Copa del Rey runners-up)
- Intertoto Cup: Valencia; Deportivo La Coruña; Athletic Bilbao
- Matches: 380
- Goals: 980 (2.58 per match)
- Top goalscorer: Samuel Eto'o; Diego Forlán (25 goals each)
- Biggest home win: Real Madrid 6–1 Albacete (14 November 2004); Real Madrid 5–0 Levante (28 November 2004); Real Madrid 5–0 Racing Santander (7 May 2005)
- Biggest away win: Osasuna 1–6 Málaga (27 February 2005)
- Highest scoring: Athletic Bilbao 4–4 Real Betis (13 February 2005)

The 2004–05 La Liga season was the 74th since its establishment. It began on 28 August 2004, and concluded on 29 May 2005.

== Teams ==
Twenty teams competed in the league – the top seventeen teams from the previous season and the three teams promoted from the Segunda División. The promoted teams were Levante (playing top flight football for the first time in thirty nine years), Getafe (playing in the top flight for the first time ever) and Numancia (returning after a three-year absence). They replaced Valladolid, Celta de Vigo and Murcia after spending time in the top flight for eleven, twelve and one years respectively.

| ▲ Promoted to 2004–05 La Liga | ▼ Relegated from 2003–04 La Liga |
|---|---|
| Levante; Getafe; Numancia | Valladolid; Celta Vigo; Murcia |

Location of teams in La Liga 2004–05

| Team | Stadium | Capacity |
|---|---|---|
| Albacete | Carlos Belmonte | 18,000 |
| Athletic Bilbao | San Mamés | 39,750 |
| Atlético Madrid | Vicente Calderón | 55,005 |
| Barcelona | Camp Nou | 98,772 |
| Betis | Manuel Ruiz de Lopera | 52,132 |
| Deportivo de La Coruña | Riazor | 34,600 |
| Espanyol | Estadi Olímpic Lluís Companys | 55,926 |
| Getafe* | Coliseum Alfonso Pérez | 16,300 |
| Levante* | Ciudad de Valencia | 25,354 |
| Málaga | La Rosaleda | 30,044 |
| Mallorca | Son Moix | 23,142 |
| Numancia* | Los Pajaritos | 8,261 |
| Osasuna | El Sadar | 19,553 |
| Racing de Santander | El Sardinero | 22,400 |
| Real Madrid | Santiago Bernabéu | 80,354 |
| Real Sociedad | Anoeta | 32,200 |
| Sevilla | Ramón Sánchez Pizjuán | 45,500 |
| Valencia | Mestalla | 55,000 |
| Villarreal | El Madrigal | 23,000 |
| Zaragoza | La Romareda | 34,596 |

(*) Promoted from Segunda División.

=== Personnel and sponsors ===
| Team | Head Coach | Kit manufacturer | Shirt sponsor (front) | Shirt sponsor (back) | Shirt sponsor (sleeve) | Shorts sponsor |
|---|---|---|---|---|---|---|
| Albacete | (Spain) Martín Monteagudo | Le Coq Sportif | IV Centenario Don Quijote de La Mancha | Caja Castilla-La Mancha/Arcos Cuchillos | None | Caja Castilla-La Mancha, Metalpanel La Mancha |
| Athletic Bilbao | (Spain) Ernesto Valverde | 100% Athletic | Euskadi (in UEFA matches) | None | None | None |
| Atlético Madrid | (Spain) César Ferrando | Nike | Columbia Pictures | None | None | AXN |
| Barcelona | (Netherlands) Frank Rijkaard | Nike | None | None | TV3 | None |
| Betis | (Spain) Lorenzo Serra Ferrer | Kappa | Andalucía/Globet/El Monte (in cup matches) | Globet/Andalucía | None | Coosur |
| Deportivo de La Coruña | (Spain) Javier Irureta | Joma | Fadesa | None | None | None |
| Espanyol | (Spain) Miguel Ángel Lotina | Umbro | Grup Tarradellas | Interapuestas.com | TV3 | Hoteles Hesperia |
| Getafe | (Spain) Quique Sánchez Flores | Joma | Opción Centro de Ocio | None | None | Propietarios del Suelo de Getafe |
| Levante | (Spain) José Luis Oltra | Hummel | Mutua Valenciana Automovilista | None | None | Mutua Valenciana Automovilista |
| Málaga | (Spain) Antonio Tapia | Umbro | Unicaja/Andalucía | None | None | None |
| Mallorca | (Argentina) Héctor Cúper | Reial | Spanair | None | None | Illes Balears |
| Numancia | (Spain) Máximo Hernández | Joma | Caja Duero | None | None | Soria |
| Osasuna | (Mexico) Javier Aguirre | Astore | Caja Navarra | None | Reyno de Navarra | None |
| Racing de Santander | (Spain) Nando Yosu | Joma | Organización Impulsora de Discapacitados | Santander 250 | Cantabria | Cantabria |
| Real Madrid | (Brazil) Vanderlei Luxemburgo | Adidas | Siemens Mobile | None | None | None |
| Real Sociedad | (Spain) José Mari Amorrortu | Astore | FIATC Seguros | NGS Europe | NGS Europe | FIATC Seguros, NGS Europe |
| Sevilla | (Spain) Joaquín Caparrós | Joma | Font Lys Agua Mineral/Vinícola Hidalgo/La Gitana (in UEFA matches) | Font Lys Agua Mineral/La Gitana | Locura Energy Drink | Coosur |
| Valencia | (Spain) Antonio López | Nike | Toyota | None | Canal Nou | None |
| Villarreal | (Chile) Manuel Pellegrini | Puma | Aeroport Castelló | None | Canal Nou | None |
| Zaragoza | (Spain) Víctor Muñoz | Lotto | Pikolin | None | None | None |

== League table ==
| Pos | Team | Pld | W | D | L | GF | GA | GD | Pts | Qualification or relegation |
|---|---|---|---|---|---|---|---|---|---|---|
| 1 | Barcelona (C) | 38 | 25 | 9 | 4 | 73 | 29 | +44 | 84 | Qualification for the Champions League group stage |
| 2 | Real Madrid | 38 | 25 | 5 | 8 | 71 | 32 | +39 | 80 | Qualification for the Champions League group stage |
| 3 | Villarreal | 38 | 18 | 11 | 9 | 69 | 37 | +32 | 65 | Qualification for the Champions League third qualifying round |
| 4 | Real Betis | 38 | 16 | 14 | 8 | 62 | 50 | +12 | 62 | Qualification for the Champions League third qualifying round |
| 5 | Espanyol | 38 | 17 | 10 | 11 | 54 | 46 | +8 | 61 | Qualification for the UEFA Cup first round |
| 6 | Sevilla | 38 | 17 | 9 | 12 | 44 | 41 | +3 | 60 | Qualification for the UEFA Cup first round |
| 7 | Valencia | 38 | 14 | 16 | 8 | 54 | 39 | +15 | 58 | Qualification for the Intertoto Cup third round |
| 8 | Deportivo La Coruña | 38 | 12 | 15 | 11 | 46 | 50 | −4 | 51 (Note: DEP: 8 pts; ATH: 4 pts → ATH 1–0 MLG; MLG: 4 pts → MLG 1–0 ATH) | Qualification for the Intertoto Cup second round |
| 9 | Athletic Bilbao | 38 | 14 | 9 | 15 | 59 | 54 | +5 | 51 | Qualification for the Intertoto Cup second round |
| 10 | Málaga | 38 | 15 | 6 | 17 | 40 | 48 | −8 | 51 | |
| 11 | Atlético Madrid | 38 | 13 | 11 | 14 | 40 | 34 | +6 | 50 (Note: ATM 1–1 ZAR; ZAR 0–0 ATM) | |
| 12 | Zaragoza | 38 | 14 | 8 | 16 | 52 | 57 | −5 | 50 | |
| 13 | Getafe | 38 | 12 | 11 | 15 | 38 | 46 | −8 | 47 (Note: RSO 1–1 GET; GET 2–0 RSO) | |
| 14 | Real Sociedad | 38 | 13 | 8 | 17 | 47 | 56 | −9 | 47 | |
| 15 | Osasuna | 38 | 12 | 10 | 16 | 46 | 65 | −19 | 46 | Qualification for the UEFA Cup first round (Note: Since Betis, winners of 2004–05 Copa del Rey, was qualified for the 2005–06 UEFA Champions League, losing cup finalists Osasuna earned a spot in the first round of the 2005–06 UEFA Cup.) |
| 16 | Racing Santander | 38 | 12 | 8 | 18 | 41 | 58 | −17 | 44 | |
| 17 | Mallorca | 38 | 10 | 9 | 19 | 42 | 63 | −21 | 39 | |
| 18 | Levante (R) | 38 | 9 | 10 | 19 | 39 | 58 | −19 | 37 | Relegation to the Segunda División |
| 19 | Numancia (R) | 38 | 6 | 11 | 21 | 30 | 61 | −31 | 29 | Relegation to the Segunda División |
| 20 | Albacete (R) | 38 | 6 | 10 | 22 | 33 | 56 | −23 | 28 | Relegation to the Segunda División |

Source: LFP
Rules for classification: 1st points; 2nd head-to-head points; 3rd head-to-head goal difference; 4th head-to-head goals scored; 5th goal difference; 6th number of goals scored; 7th Fair-play points
(C) Champions; (R) Relegated

== Overall ==
- Most wins – Barcelona and Real Madrid (25)
- Fewest wins – Numancia and Albacete (6)
- Most draws – Valencia (16)
- Fewest draws – Real Madrid (5)
- Most losses – Albacete (22)
- Fewest losses – Barcelona (4)
- Most goals scored – Barcelona (73)
- Fewest goals scored – Numancia (30)
- Most goals conceded – Osasuna (65)
- Fewest goals conceded – Barcelona (29)

== Results ==
| Home \ Away | ALB | ATH | ATM | FCB | BET | RCD | ESP | GET | LEV | MCF | MLL | NUM | OSA | RAC | RMA | RSO | SFC | VCF | VIL | ZAR |
|---|---|---|---|---|---|---|---|---|---|---|---|---|---|---|---|---|---|---|---|---|
| Albacete | | 1–0 | 0–2 | 1–2 | 0–0 | 0–1 | 1–0 | 1–1 | 3–1 | 1–2 | 0–0 | 1–2 | 1–1 | 0–0 | 1–2 | 2–2 | 0–2 | 0–1 | 2–2 | 2–1 |
| Athletic Bilbao | 3–1 | | 1–0 | 1–1 | 4–4 | 1–2 | 1–1 | 1–2 | 3–1 | 1–0 | 4–0 | 0–2 | 4–3 | 3–0 | 2–1 | 3–0 | 1–3 | 2–2 | 2–1 | 2–0 |
| Atlético Madrid | 3–1 | 1–1 | | 1–1 | 1–2 | 1–0 | 0–0 | 2–2 | 0–0 | 2–0 | 4–0 | 2–0 | 3–2 | 1–0 | 0–3 | 1–0 | 3–0 | 1–0 | 1–0 | 1–1 |
| Barcelona | 2–0 | 2–0 | 0–2 | | 3–3 | 2–1 | 0–0 | 2–0 | 2–1 | 4–0 | 2–0 | 1–0 | 3–0 | 3–0 | 3–0 | 1–0 | 2–0 | 1–1 | 3–3 | 4–1 |
| Betis | 2–1 | 2–1 | 1–0 | 2–1 | | 2–0 | 1–4 | 2–2 | 2–2 | 1–1 | 2–0 | 4–0 | 3–1 | 2–1 | 1–1 | 2–3 | 1–0 | 1–1 | 2–1 | 3–2 |
| Deportivo La Coruña | 0–0 | 1–1 | 2–0 | 0–1 | 1–1 | | 4–1 | 2–1 | 1–0 | 1–0 | 0–3 | 1–1 | 1–3 | 1–4 | 2–0 | 2–2 | 2–2 | 1–5 | 1–1 | 2–3 |
| Espanyol | 2–1 | 2–0 | 2–1 | 0–1 | 2–2 | 1–1 | | 2–0 | 2–1 | 1–0 | 2–1 | 3–0 | 4–1 | 2–1 | 1–0 | 2–2 | 1–3 | 2–2 | 0–0 | 3–1 |
| Getafe | 1–0 | 3–1 | 1–1 | 1–2 | 0–2 | 1–1 | 1–0 | | 1–0 | 1–0 | 1–2 | 1–0 | 0–0 | 2–0 | 2–1 | 2–0 | 0–0 | 1–0 | 1–2 | 3–0 |
| Levante | 1–1 | 1–0 | 1–0 | 1–1 | 1–2 | 0–1 | 0–2 | 0–0 | | 0–1 | 2–0 | 1–1 | 4–0 | 3–1 | 0–2 | 2–1 | 0–3 | 0–0 | 2–4 | 0–0 |
| Málaga | 0–2 | 1–0 | 1–0 | 0–4 | 1–2 | 1–1 | 3–2 | 1–1 | 1–0 | | 0–0 | 4–1 | 2–0 | 2–0 | 0–2 | 1–5 | 1–0 | 0–2 | 0–2 | 0–0 |
| Mallorca | 2–1 | 4–3 | 1–1 | 1–3 | 1–1 | 2–2 | 3–2 | 3–1 | 1–2 | 1–2 | | 3–2 | 1–2 | 1–2 | 0–1 | 3–2 | 0–1 | 0–0 | 1–1 | 0–2 |
| Numancia | 0–0 | 1–1 | 1–0 | 1–1 | 1–1 | 1–1 | 0–0 | 1–0 | 1–3 | 0–1 | 1–2 | | 2–2 | 2–3 | 1–2 | 0–2 | 2–1 | 1–1 | 1–1 | 2–1 |
| Osasuna | 3–2 | 1–1 | 1–0 | 0–1 | 3–2 | 1–1 | 1–1 | 2–1 | 0–1 | 1–6 | 1–1 | 2–0 | | 1–0 | 1–2 | 1–0 | 4–1 | 0–0 | 3–2 | 2–2 |
| Racing Santander | 1–0 | 0–2 | 2–1 | 0–2 | 1–1 | 2–2 | 1–3 | 2–1 | 2–2 | 2–1 | 3–0 | 2–0 | 1–1 | | 2–3 | 1–3 | 0–0 | 1–0 | 1–1 | 1–0 |
| Real Madrid | 6–1 | 0–2 | 0–0 | 4–2 | 3–1 | 0–1 | 4–0 | 2–0 | 5–0 | 1–0 | 3–1 | 1–0 | 1–0 | 5–0 | | 2–1 | 0–1 | 1–0 | 2–1 | 3–1 |
| Real Sociedad | 0–2 | 3–2 | 1–0 | 0–0 | 1–0 | 1–0 | 0–2 | 1–1 | 1–1 | 1–3 | 2–1 | 2–1 | 2–0 | 0–1 | 0–2 | | 1–0 | 3–3 | 0–4 | 2–1 |
| Sevilla | 1–0 | 2–0 | 2–1 | 0–4 | 2–1 | 2–0 | 1–0 | 0–0 | 3–0 | 0–2 | 1–1 | 1–0 | 0–1 | 2–2 | 2–2 | 2–1 | | 2–2 | 2–1 | 0–1 |
| Valencia | 2–0 | 2–2 | 1–1 | 0–2 | 2–1 | 1–2 | 3–0 | 3–1 | 2–1 | 2–2 | 2–0 | 1–0 | 1–0 | 2–0 | 1–1 | 3–1 | 1–2 | | 2–1 | 0–0 |
| Villarreal | 1–0 | 3–1 | 3–2 | 3–0 | 0–0 | 0–2 | 4–1 | 4–0 | 4–1 | 3–0 | 2–1 | 4–0 | 3–0 | 2–1 | 0–0 | 0–0 | 0–0 | 3–1 | | 2–0 |
| Zaragoza | 4–3 | 0–2 | 0–0 | 1–4 | 1–0 | 2–2 | 0–1 | 3–1 | 4–3 | 1–0 | 0–1 | 4–1 | 5–1 | 1–0 | 1–3 | 2–1 | 3–0 | 2–2 | 1–0 | |

Source: LFP (in Spanish)
Legend: Blue = home team win; Yellow = draw; Red = away team win.

== Awards ==
=== Individual Awards ===
Annual awards
| Award | Winner | Club |
|---|---|---|
| Pichichi Trophy | (Uruguay) Diego Forlán | Villarreal |
| Ricardo Zamora Trophy | (Spain) Víctor Valdés | Barcelona |
| Don Balón Spanish Player of the Year | (Spain) Xavi | Barcelona |
| Don Balón Foreign Player of the Year | (Argentina) Juan Román Riquelme | Villarreal |
| Don Balón Young Player of the Year | (Spain) Sergio Ramos | Sevilla |
| Don Balón Coach of the Year | (Netherlands) Frank Rijkaard | Barcelona |
| Don Balón Referee of the Year | (Spain) Alberto Undiano Mallenco | — |

=== Team of the Season ===

La Liga Team of the Season
| Goalkeeper | (Spain) Iker Casillas (Real Madrid) | | | |
| Defenders | (Spain) Sergio Ramos (Sevilla) | (Colombia) Luis Amaranto Perea (Atlético Madrid) | (Spain) Carles Puyol (Barcelona) | (Spain) Asier del Horno (Athletic Bilbao) |
| Midfielders | (Spain) Joaquín (Real Betis) | (Portugal) Deco (Barcelona) | (Argentina) Juan Román Riquelme (Villarreal) | (Brazil) Júlio Baptista (Sevilla) |
| Forwards | (Cameroon) Samuel Eto'o (Barcelona) | | (Uruguay) Diego Forlán (Villarreal) | |

=== Pichichi Trophy ===
The Pichichi Trophy is awarded to the player who scores the most goals in a season.

| Rank | Player | Club | Goals |
|---|---|---|---|
| 1 | (Cameroon) Samuel Eto'o | Barcelona | 25 |
| 1 | (Uruguay) Diego Forlán | Villarreal | 25 |
| 3 | (Brazil) Ricardo Oliveira | Real Betis | 22 |
| 4 | (Brazil) Ronaldo | Real Madrid | 21 |
| 5 | (Brazil) Júlio Baptista | Sevilla | 18 |
| 6 | (Spain) Fernando Torres | Atlético Madrid | 16 |
| 7 | (Argentina) Juan Román Riquelme | Villarreal | 15 |
| 7 | (Argentina) Maxi Rodríguez | Espanyol | 15 |
| 7 | (Spain) David Villa | Zaragoza | 15 |
| 10 | (Turkey) Nihat Kahveci | Real Sociedad | 13 |
| 10 | (England) Michael Owen | Real Madrid | 13 |

=== Top assists ===
| Rank | Player | Club | Assists |
|---|---|---|---|
| 1 | (Spain) Joaquín | Real Betis | 15 |
| 2 | (Portugal) Deco | Barcelona | 11 |
| 3 | (Spain) Francisco Yeste | Athletic Bilbao | 10 |
| 4 | (Argentina) Juan Román Riquelme | Villarreal | 9 |
| 4 | (Brazil) Ronaldinho | Barcelona | 9 |

=== Zamora Trophy ===
The Ricardo Zamora Trophy is awarded to the goalkeeper with the lowest ratio of goals conceded to matches played.

| Rank | Player | Club | Goals against | Matches | Average |
|---|---|---|---|---|---|
| 1 | (Spain) Víctor Valdés | Barcelona | 25 | 35 | 0.71 |
| 2 | (Spain) Iker Casillas | Real Madrid | 30 | 37 | 0.81 |
| 3 | (Argentina) Leo Franco | Atlético Madrid | 32 | 37 | 0.86 |
| 4 | (Spain) Pepe Reina | Villarreal | 37 | 38 | 0.97 |
| 5 | (Spain) Santiago Cañizares | Valencia | 29 | 29 | 1 |
| 6 | (Spain) Esteban | Sevilla | 33 | 28 | 1.18 |
| 6 | (Cameroon) Carlos Kameni | Espanyol | 45 | 38 | 1.18 |
| 8 | (Spain) Toni Doblas | Real Betis | 35 | 29 | 1.21 |
| 9 | (Spain) Daniel Aranzubia | Athletic Bilbao | 52 | 37 | 1.41 |
| 9 | (Spain) Luis García | Zaragoza | 52 | 37 | 1.41 |

=== Fair Play award ===
This season, the award was not published neither given to any club due to an administrative affair.

=== Hat-tricks ===
| Player | Club | Against | Result | Date |
|---|---|---|---|---|
| (Argentina) Maxi Rodríguez | Espanyol | Real Betis | 4–1 (A) | 12 September 2004 |
| (Spain) Sergio Pachón | Getafe | Athletic Bilbao | 3–1 (H) | 3 October 2004 |
| (Argentina) Juan Román Riquelme | Villarreal | Valencia | 3–1 (H) | 23 January 2005 |
| (Brazil) Ricardo Oliveira | Real Betis | Athletic Bilbao | 4–4 (A) | 13 February 2005 |
| (Spain) Salva | Atlético Madrid | Mallorca | 3–1 (H) | 3 April 2005 |
| (Israel) Yossi Benayoun | Racing Santander | Deportivo La Coruña | 4–1 (A) | 24 April 2005 |
| (Uruguay) Diego Forlán | Villarreal | Barcelona | 3–3 (A) | 22 May 2005 |

== Attendances ==
| # | Club | Avg. attendance | % change | Highest |
|---|---|---|---|---|
| 1 | FC Barcelona | 73,357 | 8.5% | 97,905 |
| 2 | Real Madrid | 71,934 | 3.9% | 80,000 |
| 3 | Atlético de Madrid | 42,579 | -4.0% | 57,000 |
| 4 | Valencia CF | 42,442 | -8.3% | 50,000 |
| 5 | Sevilla FC | 39,526 | 12.0% | 45,000 |
| 6 | Real Betis | 33,263 | 1.7% | 45,000 |
| 7 | Athletic Club | 32,427 | -0.5% | 40,000 |
| 8 | Real Zaragoza | 30,947 | 4.4% | 34,000 |
| 9 | RCD Espanyol | 24,067 | 0.7% | 41,850 |
| 10 | Málaga CF | 22,053 | 6.7% | 30,000 |
| 11 | Deportivo de La Coruña | 21,684 | -16.8% | 35,000 |
| 12 | Real Sociedad | 21,090 | -19.5% | 26,588 |
| 13 | Villarreal CF | 18,211 | 14.4% | 22,000 |
| 14 | Levante UD | 16,964 | 19.1% | 25,000 |
| 15 | RCD Mallorca | 15,399 | -6.7% | 23,620 |
| 16 | CA Osasuna | 14,967 | -1.9% | 17,814 |
| 17 | Racing de Santander | 13,452 | -0.6% | 17,589 |
| 18 | Albacete Balompié | 12,900 | -16.5% | 17,000 |
| 19 | Getafe CF | 12,811 | 81.8% | 14,500 |
| 20 | CD Numancia | 7,958 | 54.0% | 12,000 |

== See also ==
- 2004–05 Segunda División
- 2004–05 Copa del Rey
