= 2005–06 Real Zaragoza season =

Real Zaragoza
2005–06 season
- President: Alfonso Soláns
- Head coach: Víctor Muñoz
- Stadium: La Romareda
- La Liga: 11th
- Copa del Rey: Runners-up
- Top goalscorer: League: Diego Milito (15); All: Diego Milito (21)

The 2005–06 Real Zaragoza season was Real Zaragoza's third consecutive season in top-division of the Spanish football league, the La Liga, and the 74th as a football club.

== Pre-season and friendlies ==
Win Draw Loss

20 July 2005 Friendly	Boltaña CF (Spain)	0–9	(Spain) Zaragoza	Spain

23 July 2005 Friendly	Huesca (Spain)	2–2	(Spain) Zaragoza	Spain

4 August 2005 Friendly	Panathinaikos (Greece)	2–0	(Spain) Zaragoza	Greece

5 August 2005 Friendly	Aris Thessaloniki (Greece)	3–4	(Spain) Zaragoza	Greece

13 August 2005 Friendly	Osasuna (Spain)	1–0	(Spain) Zaragoza	Spain

11 October 2005 Trofeo Ciudad de Zaragoza	Zaragoza (Spain)	2–2	(Spain) Real Madrid	Zaragoza
				Stadium: La Romareda

== Competitions ==
=== Overview ===
Competition	First match	Last match	Starting round	Final position	Record							
Competition	First match	Last match	Starting round	Final position	Pld	W	D	L	GF	GA	GD	Win %
La Liga	28 August 2005	13 May 2006	Matchday 1	11th	38	10	16	12	46	51	−5	26.32
Copa del Rey	19 October 2005	12 April 2006	Third round	Runners-up	9	3	3	3	18	18	+0	33.33
Total					47	13	19	15	64	69	−5	27.66

Source: Soccerway

=== La Liga ===
==== League table ====
Pos	Team	Pld	W	D	L	GF	GA	GD	Pts
9	Getafe	38	15	9	14	54	49	+5	54
10	Atlético Madrid	38	13	13	12	45	37	+8	52
11	Zaragoza	38	10	16	12	46	51	−5	46
12	Athletic Bilbao	38	11	12	15	40	46	−6	45
13	Mallorca	38	10	13	15	37	51	−14	43

Source: LFP
Rules for classification: 1st points; 2nd head-to-head points; 3rd head-to-head goal difference; 4th head-to-head goals scored; 5th goal difference; 6th number of goals scored; 7th Fair-play points

==== Results summary ====
Overall								Home						Away					
Pld	W	D	L	GF	GA	GD	Pts	W	D	L	GF	GA	GD	W	D	L	GF	GA	GD
38	10	16	12	46	51	−5	46	6	6	7	26	26	0	4	10	5	20	25	−5

Source: La Liga

==== Results by round ====
Round	1	2	3	4	5	6	7	8	9	10	11	12	13	14	15	16	17	18	19	20	21	22	23	24	25	26	27	28	29	30	31	32	33	34	35	36	37	38
Ground	A	H	A	H	H	A	H	A	H	A	H	A	H	A	H	A	H	A	H	H	A	H	A	A	H	A	H	A	H	A	H	A	H	A	H	A	H	A
Result	D	D	D	W	D	D	L	L	D	L	D	D	L	W	W	D	W	W	W	L	D	W	D	D	L	W	L	W	D	D	L	D	L	L	D	L	W	L
Position	12	14	14	4	8	8	13	15	14	16	16	16	16	14	12	11	10	9	9	10	10	9	10	10	10	10	11	10	10	10	11	11	11	11	11	11	11	11

Source: La Liga
A = Away; H = Home; W = Win; D = Draw; L = Loss

==== Matches ====
28 August 2005 1	Atlético Madrid	0–0	Zaragoza	Madrid

11 September 2005 2	Zaragoza	2–2	Valencia	Zaragoza

18 September 2006 3	Real Betis	0–0	Zaragoza	Seville

21 September 2005 4	Zaragoza	3–1	Osasuna	Zaragoza

24 September 2005 5	Zaragoza	1–1	Deportivo La Coruña	Zaragoza

1 October 2005 6	Barcelona	2–2	Zaragoza	Barcelona

16 October 2005 7	Zaragoza	0–1	Real Sociedad	Zaragoza

23 October 2005 8	Getafe	5–2	Zaragoza	Getafe

27 October 2005 11	Zaragoza	1–1	Racing Santander	Zaragoza

30 October 2005 9	Zaragoza	1–1	Málaga	Zaragoza

6 November 2005 10	Real Madrid	1–0	Zaragoza	Madrid

19 November 2005 12	Villarreal	0–0	Zaragoza	Villarreal

27 November 2005 13	Zaragoza	0–2	Sevilla	Zaragoza

4 December 2005 14	Cádiz	1–2	Zaragoza	Cádiz

11 December 2005 15	Zaragoza	1–0	Celta Vigo	Zaragoza

18 December 2005 16	Espanyol	2–2	Zaragoza	Barcelona

21 December 2005 17	Zaragoza	3–2	Athletic Bilbao	Zaragoza

8 January 2006 18	Alavés	0–2	Zaragoza	Vitoria-Gasteiz

15 January 2006 19	Zaragoza	3–1	Mallorca	Zaragoza

21 January 2006 20	Zaragoza	0–2	Atlético Madrid	Zaragoza

29 January 2006 21	Valencia	2–2	Zaragoza	Valencia

5 February 2006 22	Zaragoza	4–3	Real Betis	Zaragoza

11 February 2006 23	Osasuna	1–1	Zaragoza	Pamplona

19 February 2006 24	Deportivo La Coruña	1–1	Zaragoza	A Coruña

25 February 2006 25	Zaragoza	0–2	Barcelona	Zaragoza

5 March 2006 26	Real Sociedad	1–3	Zaragoza	San Sebastián

12 March 2006 27	Zaragoza	1–2	Getafe	Zaragoza

19 March 2006 28	Málaga	0–1	Zaragoza	Málaga

22 March 2006 29	Zaragoza	1–1	Real Madrid	Zaragoza

26 March 2006 30	Racing Santander	0–0	Zaragoza	Santander

1 April 2006 31	Zaragoza	0–1	Villarreal	Zaragoza

9 April 2006 32	Sevilla	1–1	Zaragoza	Seville

16 April 2006 33	Zaragoza	1–2	Cádiz	Zaragoza

22 April 2006 34	Celta Vigo	4–0	Zaragoza	Vigo

30 April 2006 35	Zaragoza	1–1	Espanyol	Zaragoza

3 May 2006 36	Athletic Bilbao	1–0	Zaragoza	Bilbao

7 May 2006 37	Zaragoza	3–0	Alavés	Zaragoza

13 May 2006 38	Mallorca	3–1	Zaragoza	Palma

=== Copa del Rey ===
19 October 2005 Third round	Alicante	1–1 (5–6 p)	Zaragoza	Alicante

30 November 2005 Fourth round	Xerez	2–2 (6–7 p)	Zaragoza	Jerez de la Frontera

11 January 2006 Round of 16; First leg	Atlético Madrid	0–1	Zaragoza	Madrid

18 January 2006 Round of 16; Second leg	Zaragoza	2–2 (3–2 agg.)	Atlético Madrid	Zaragoza

26 January 2006 Quarter-finals; First leg	Zaragoza	4–2	Barcelona	Zaragoza

1 February 2006 Quarter-finals; Second leg	Barcelona	2–1 (4–5 agg.)	Zaragoza	Barcelona

8 February 2006 Semi-finals; First leg	Zaragoza	6–1	Real Madrid	Zaragoza

14 February 2006 Semi-finals; Second leg	Real Madrid	4–0 (5–6 agg.)	Zaragoza	Madrid

12 April 2006 Final	Espanyol	4–1	Zaragoza	Madrid
	Tamudo 2'; García 33', 86'; Coro 71'		Ewerthon 28'	Stadium: Santiago Bernabéu; Attendance: 78,000; Referee: Luis Medina Cantalejo
