= Momo (Spanish footballer) =

Spanish footballer

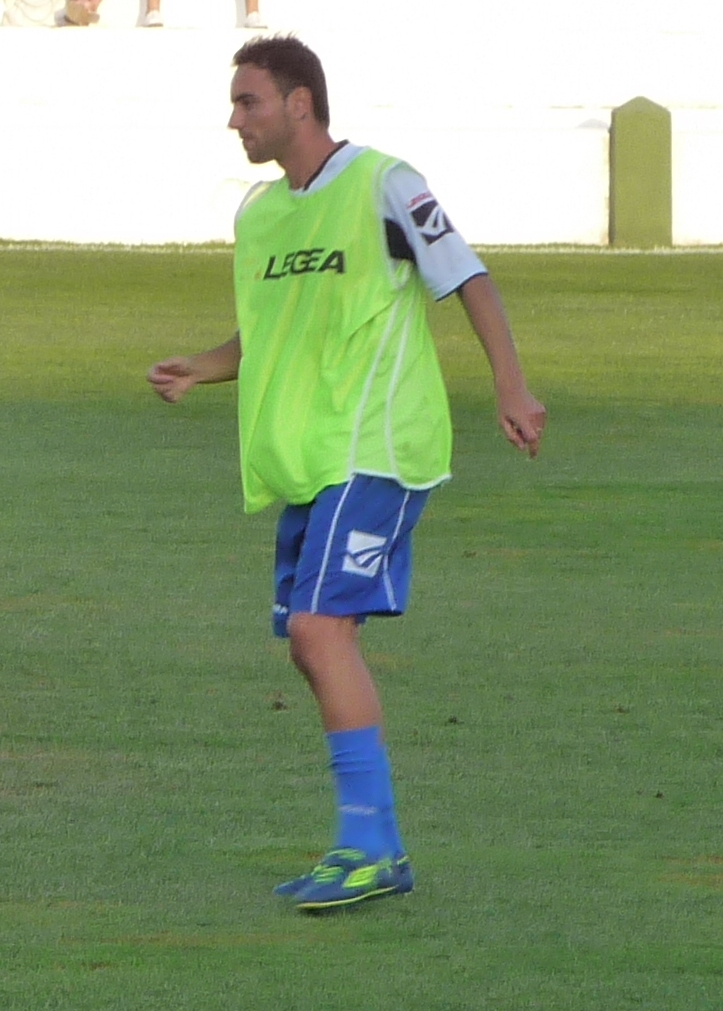
- Momo training with Xerez in 2009

Personal information
- Full name: Jerónimo Figueroa Cabrera
- Date of birth: 15 July 1982 (age 44)
- Place of birth: Las Palmas, Spain
- Height: 1.84 m (6 ft 0 in)
- Position: Winger

Youth career
- Las Palmas

Senior career*
Years	Team	Apps	(Gls)
2001–2003	Las Palmas B		
2003–2004	Las Palmas	40	(3)
2004–2008	Deportivo La Coruña	5	(0)
2004–2005	→ Albacete (loan)	24	(1)
2006–2007	→ Racing Santander (loan)	13	(0)
2007–2008	→ Xerez (loan)	32	(0)
2008–2010	Xerez	66	(19)
2010–2012	Betis	20	(0)
2012–2019	Las Palmas	179	(20)
Total		379+	(43+)
- * Club domestic league appearances and goals

Jerónimo Figueroa Cabrera (born 15 July 1982), known as Momo, is a Spanish former professional footballer who played as a winger.

== Club career ==
Born in Las Palmas, Canary Islands, Momo was signed from hometown's UD Las Palmas in 2004 by Deportivo de La Coruña. Rarely used at Depor, he served three loans in four years: Albacete Balompié, Racing de Santander and Segunda División side Xerez CD. His La Liga debut came on 29 August 2004 as he played 33 minutes for Albacete in a 1–0 away loss to Sevilla FC, and all of his five league appearances for the Galicians came during the next season, four of them also from the bench; he was definitely released in August 2008.

For 2008–09, already a free agent, Momo remained at Xerez, being instrumental in the Andalusians' first-ever promotion to the top flight by scoring 17 goals in the league alone (fifth-best in the competition). His attacking production decreased significantly the following campaign as he only found the net on two occasions, both against Málaga CF on 7 March 2010 in a 4–2 away win; he put his team ahead in the fifth minute, then volleyed home the rebound after his penalty kick had been saved by Gustavo Munúa with 18 minutes to go.

In late June 2010, after the club's relegation, Momo signed with neighbouring Real Betis, which in turn had failed to promote. He appeared only in 18 games during the season due to injury problems – 13 starts, 980 minutes of action – as this time the goal was achieved, as champions.

== Honours ==
Xerez

- Segunda División: 2008–09

Betis

- Segunda División: 2010–11
