= Luismi (footballer, born 1983) =

Spanish footballer

Personal information
- Full name: Luis Miguel Gracia Julián
- Date of birth: 18 July 1983 (age 43)
- Place of birth: Cáceres, Spain
- Height: 1.76 m (5 ft 9 1/2 in)
- Positions: Forward; winger

Youth career
- Cacereño

Senior career*
| Years | Team | Apps | (Gls) |
| 2000–2001 | Cacereño | | |
| 2001–2004 | Espanyol B | 72 | (19) |
| 2004–2005 | Espanyol | 1 | (0) |
| 2004 | → Albacete (loan) | 0 | (0) |
| 2005 | → Murcia (loan) | 21 | (0) |
| 2005–2006 | Albacete | 11 | (0) |
| 2006–2008 | Lleida | 74 | (14) |
| 2008–2010 | Espanyol B | 42 | (13) |
| 2010–2011 | Cacereño | 35 | (8) |
| 2011–2012 | Lugo | 32 | (5) |
| 2012–2013 | Alavés | 15 | (2) |
| 2013–2014 | Huracán | 33 | (6) |
| 2014–2015 | Gimnàstic | 22 | (3) |
| 2016 | Alcoyano | 11 | (1) |
| 2016–2018 | Sant Andreu | 24 | (5) |
| Total | | 393 | (76) |
- * Club domestic league appearances and goals

Luis Miguel Gracia Julián (born 18 July 1983 in Cáceres, Extremadura), known as Luismi, is a Spanish former professional footballer who played as a forward or right winger.
