= Pablo García (footballer, born 1985) =

Spanish footballer

Personal information
- Full name: Pablo García Moreno
- Date of birth: 30 May 1985 (age 41)
- Place of birth: Albacete, Spain
- Height: 1.80 m (5 ft 11 in)
- Position: Right back

Team information
- Current team: Huracán Balazote

Youth career
- Albacete

Senior career*
Years	Team	Apps	(Gls)
2004–2006	Albacete B		
2005–2006	Albacete	4	(0)
2006–2009	Orihuela	69	(0)
2009–2011	Roquetas	73	(0)
2011–2012	Teruel	32	(0)
2012–2013	Hellín	37	(0)
2013–2014	Almansa	35	(1)
2014–2017	La Roda	107	(2)
2017–2021	Villarrobledo	94	(3)
2021–	Huracán Balazote	70	(3)
- * Club domestic league appearances and goals as of 13 October 2024

Pablo García Moreno (born 30 May 1985) is a Spanish footballer who plays for Huracán Balazote as a right back.

== Football career ==
Born in Albacete, Castilla-La Mancha, García graduated from Albacete Balompié's youth setup, and made his debuts as a senior with the reserves in the 2004–05 campaign, in Tercera División. He made his first team – and La Liga – debut on 6 March 2005, starting in a 1–3 away loss against Athletic Bilbao.

In the 2006 summer García moved to Segunda División B side Orihuela CF. He resumed his career in the third and fourth levels in the following years, representing CD Roquetas, CD Teruel, Bakú Hellín Deportivo, UD Almansa and La Roda CF.
