= Pikolin =

Pikolin is a Spanish mattress manufacturer headquartered in Zaragoza, Aragon. The company was founded by Alfonso Solans Serrano in January 1948. Upon Solans' acquisition of the license for the production of spring mattresses in Spain, the registered brand took off in 1959. It subsequently expanded to Portugal (1988), France (2001), Italy and Malaysia. It had an annual turnover of €183 million in 2005, and employs between 1,500 and 1,600 workers, depending on production needs (about 1,000 people work at its plant in Zaragoza: 900 in production and 100 in administration and other services).

== Sponsorship ==
Pikolin has sponsored the Spanish football club Real Zaragoza from 1981 to 1984 and from 1991 to 2005. The company was selected as an official sponsor of the Expo Zaragoza 2008.
