= Hidalgo (sherry) =

Coordinates: 36.7796°N 6.3554°W

Hidalgo is a sherry producer based in Sanlúcar de Barrameda, Andalusia, Spain, whose origins can be traced back to the 18th century. The bodega produces a variety of brands and types of Sherry. Its La Gitana manzanilla is one of the best selling manzanilla sherries.
