= Ronny Gaspercic =

Belgian footballer (born 1969)

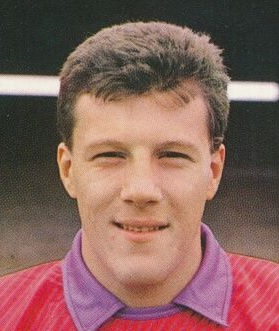
- Gaspercic with Genk in 1988

Personal information
- Full name: Ronald Louis Gaspercic
- Date of birth: 9 May 1969 (age 57)
- Place of birth: Genk, Belgium
- Height: 1.86 m (6 ft 1 in)
- Position: Goalkeeper

Senior career*
Years	Team	Apps	(Gls)
1987–1988	Winterslag	5	(0)
1988–1994	Genk	185	(0)
1996–1998	Harelbeke	67	(0)
1998–2001	Extremadura	97	(0)
2001–2003	Betis	2	(0)
2003–2004	Alavés	37	(0)
2004–2005	Albacete	17	(0)
2005–2007	Westerlo	61	(0)
Total		471	(0)

International career
1998–2001	Belgium	8	(0)
- * Club domestic league appearances and goals

Ronald 'Ronny' Louis Gaspercic (born 9 May 1969) is a Belgian retired footballer who played as a goalkeeper.

He is of Croatian descent.

== Club career ==
Born in Genk, Gaspercic started his professional career with local K.R.C. Genk, then named FC Winterslag, being first-choice for six of his nine seasons. He then moved to modest K.R.C. Harelbeke, winning the Professional goalkeeper of the year award for the 1997–98 campaign; the club finished fifth and had the best defensive record in the league, only trailing to champions Club Brugge KV (29 goals to 31).

Gaspercic then had a seven-year spell in Spain, with CF Extremadura, Real Betis, Deportivo Alavés and Albacete Balompié, in both major divisions, being a starter for the first and the third teams. He returned home in 2005, playing still two more seasons with K.V.C. Westerlo and retiring at the age of 38.

== International career ==
Gaspercic gained eight caps for Belgium between 1998 and 2001, while appearing consistently for Extremadura, but never appeared in any major tournament for the nation.

== Honours ==
Individual

- Belgian Goalkeeper of the Year: 1998
