= César (name) =

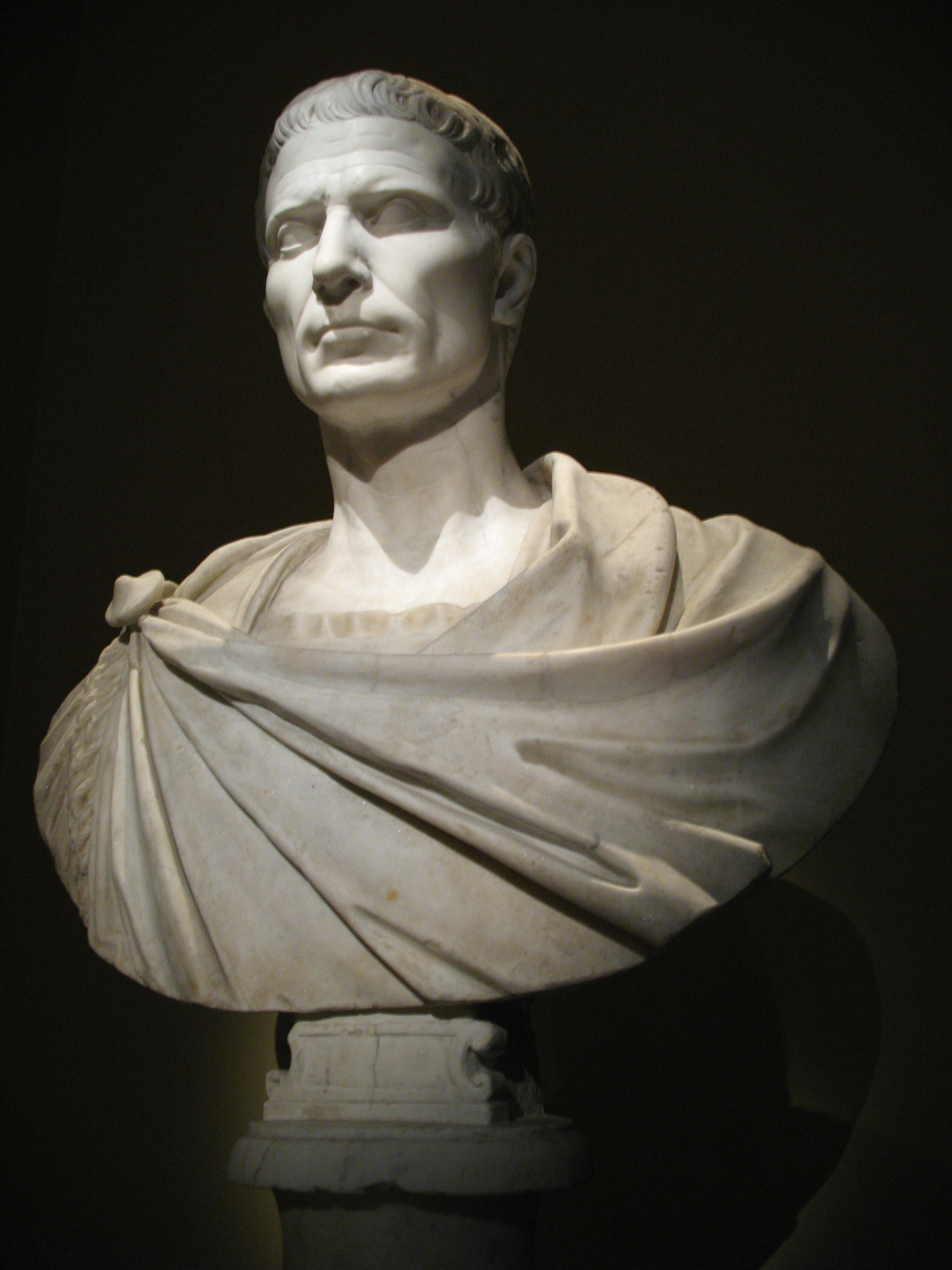
Gaius Julius Caesar

Cesar or César is a given name and surname.

== People with the given name ==
- César (footballer, born May 1979) (César Vinicio Cervo de Luca), Brazilian football centre-back
- César (footballer, born July 1979) (Clederson César de Souza), Brazilian football winger
- César (footballer, born 1995) (César Augusto Soares dos Reis Ribela), Brazilian goalkeeper
- César Alierta (born 1945), Spanish businessman
- César Azpilicueta (born 1989), Spanish footballer
- César Baena (born 1961), Venezuelan footballer
- César Baldaccini (1921–1998), French sculptor
- César Batiz, Venezuelan investigative journalist
- César Blackman (born 1998), Panamanian footballer
- Cesar Carrillo (born 1984), American baseball player
- César Cedeño (born 1951), Dominican baseball player
- Cesar Chavez (1927–1993), American farm worker, labor leader and civil rights activist
- César Córdoba (born 1980), Spanish kickboxer
- César Costa (born 1941), Mexican singer and actor
- César Crespo (born 1979), Puerto Rican baseball player, brother of Felipe Crespo
- César Cui (1835–1918), Russian composer and army officer
- César Delgado (born 1981), Argentine footballer
- César Domboy (born 1990), French actor
- César Duarte Jáquez (born 1963), Mexican politician
- César Évora (born 1959), Cuban actor
- César Franck (1822–1890), Belgian classical organist and composer
- César Gaviria (born 1947), Colombian politician
- César Gerónimo (born 1948), Dominican baseball player and coach
- César González (disambiguation), several people
- César Gutiérrez (1943–2005), Venezuelan baseball player
- César Hernández (disambiguation), several people
- César Huerta (born 2000), Mexican footballer
- César Inga (born 2002), Peruvian footballer
- César Izturis, (born 1980), Venezuelan baseball player
- César Jiménez (disambiguation), several people
- César Keiser (1925–2007), Swiss artist
- Cesar Legaspi (1917–1994), Filipino national artist
- César Manrique (1919–1992), Spanish artist, architect and activist
- César Martínez (disambiguation), several people
- César Mendoza (1918–1996), Chilean general
- César Luis Menotti (1938–2024), Argentine footballer and manager
- Cesar Millan (born 1969), Mexican-American dog trainer
- César Milstein (1927–2002), Argentinian biochemist
- Cesar Montano (born 1962), Filipino actor, film director and politician
- César Montes (born 1997), Mexican footballer
- César Mora (born 1961), Colombian musician
- César Pellegrín (born 1979), Uruguayan footballer
- César Pelli (1926–2019), Argentine architect
- Cesar Perdomo (born 2002), Venezuelan baseball player
- César Prates (born 1975), Brazilian footballer
- César Prieto (born 1999), Cuban baseball player
- César Quintero (disambiguation), several people
- Cesar Ramirez (disambiguation), several people
- Cesar Ramos (disambiguation), several people
- César Rincon (born 1965), Colombian matador
- César Ritz (1850–1918), Swiss hotelier
- César Rodriguez (disambiguation), several people
- Cesar Romero (disambiguation)
- Cesar Ruiz (disambiguation), multiple people
- César Salazar (disambiguation), multiple people
- Cesar Santos (born 1982), Cuban-American artist and portrait painter
- César Santos (born 1969), Brazilian footballer
- César Salinas (1961–2020), Bolivian football administrator
- César Sampaio (born 1968), Brazilian footballer
- César Sánchez (born 1971), Spanish footballer
- César Sánchez (swimmer) (born 1962), Mexican swimmer
- César Soto (born 1971), Mexican boxer
- César Tovar (1940–1994), Venezuelan baseball player and coach
- César Tralli (born 1970), Brazilian journalist and newscaster
- César Valdez (disambiguation), multiple people
- César Vallejo (1892–1938), Peruvian writer
- César Vargas (born 1991), Mexican baseball player
- Cesar Virata (born 1930), Filipino politician and businessman

== People with the surname ==
- Boštjan Cesar (born 1982), Slovenian footballer
- Bruno César (born 1988), Brazilian footballer
- Carlos César (born 1952), Portuguese politician
- Kaio César (born 2004), Brazilian footballer
- Nilton César (1939–2026), Brazilian singer
- Yuri César (born 2000), Brazilian footballer
