= 2006–07 Real Zaragoza season =

Real Zaragoza
2006–07 season
- Manager: Víctor Fernández
- Stadium: La Romareda
- La Liga: 6th
- Copa del Rey: Quarter-finals
- Top goalscorer: Diego Milito (23)

During the 2006–07 Spanish football season, Real Zaragoza competed in La Liga.

== Season summary ==
Zaragoza finished 6th in La Liga, qualifying for the UEFA Cup. Key to the club's good form was Argentine striker Diego Milito, who scored 23 goals in the league, making him second top scorer in La Liga and third place in the European Golden Shoe.

== First-team squad ==
Squad at end of season

Note: Flags indicate national team as defined under FIFA eligibility rules; some limited exceptions apply. Players may hold more than one non-FIFA nationality.

No.	Pos.	Nation	Player
1	GK	ESP	César Sánchez
2	DF	URU	Carlos Diogo (on loan from Real Madrid)
3	DF	ESP	Agustín Aranzábal
4	DF	ESP	Luis Cuartero
5	MF	ESP	Óscar
6	DF	ARG	Gabriel Milito (captain)
7	MF	ESP	José María Movilla
8	MF	ARG	Pablo Aimar
9	FW	ESP	Sergio García
10	MF	ARG	Andrés D'Alessandro (on loan from Wolfsburg)
11	DF	ESP	Juanfran
13	GK	ESP	Miguel
14	DF	BRA	Gustavo Nery (on loan from Corinthians)
15	MF	ESP	Ángel Lafita
16	MF	ESP	Albert Celades

No.	Pos.	Nation	Player
17	FW	BRA	Ewerthon
18	DF	ESP	Gerard Piqué (on loan from Manchester United)
20	MF	ESP	Antonio Longás
21	MF	ESP	Alberto Zapater
22	FW	ARG	Diego Milito (on loan from Genoa)
23	DF	ESP	Sergio
24	DF	ESP	Chus Herrero
26	MF	ESP	Carmelo
27	DF	ESP	Adrián Ripa
28	DF	ESP	Óscar Valero
29	MF	ESP	Eneko
30	GK	ESP	Jorge Zaparaín
31	DF	ESP	Raúl Goni
33	DF	ESP	José Carlos Gil Solano

=== Left club during season ===
Note: Flags indicate national team as defined under FIFA eligibility rules; some limited exceptions apply. Players may hold more than one non-FIFA nationality.

No. / Pos. / Nation / Player; 14 / MF / ARG / Leonardo Ponzio (to River Plate)	No. / Pos. / Nation / Player; 19 / DF / ESP / César Jiménez (retired)
