= César González =

César González may refer to:

== Sportspeople ==
- César González (fencer) (born 1965), Spanish fencer
- César Cuauhtémoc González or Silver King (1968–2019), Mexican masked wrestler and actor
- César González Navas (born 1980), Spanish footballer for FC Rubin Kazan
- César González (footballer, born 1982) (born 1982), Venezuelan footballer for Deportivo Táchira
- César González (bobsleigh) (born 1982), Dutch bobsledder born in the Dominican Republic
- César González (Chilean footballer) (born 1997)

== Others ==
- César González Martínez (1904–1984), Venezuelan lawyer and interior minister
- César Daniel González Madruga (born 1984), Mexican politician
- César Luis González (1919–1943), officer in the United States Army Air Forces
- César González (poet) (born 1989), Argentinean poet
- César Rodríguez González (1894–1962), Spanish journalist and politician

== See also ==
- César Gonzales (Peruvian footballer) (born 1956), Peruvian footballer
