= Romay =

Romay is a surname and given name. Notable people with the name include:

== People with the given name ==
- Romay Davis (1919–2024), African-American World War II veteran

== People with the surname ==
- Alejandro Romay, Argentine businessman and media mogul
- Emiliano Romay, Argentine footballer
- Fernando Romay, Spanish basketball player
- Fulgencia Romay, Cuban sprinter
- José Manuel Romay Beccaría, Spanish lawyer and politician
- Leonardo Romay, Uruguayan footballer
- Lina Romay, Spanish actress and filmmaker
- Lina Romay (singer), American actress and singer
- Manuel Romay, Spanish footballer
