= Rubén González Cárdenas =

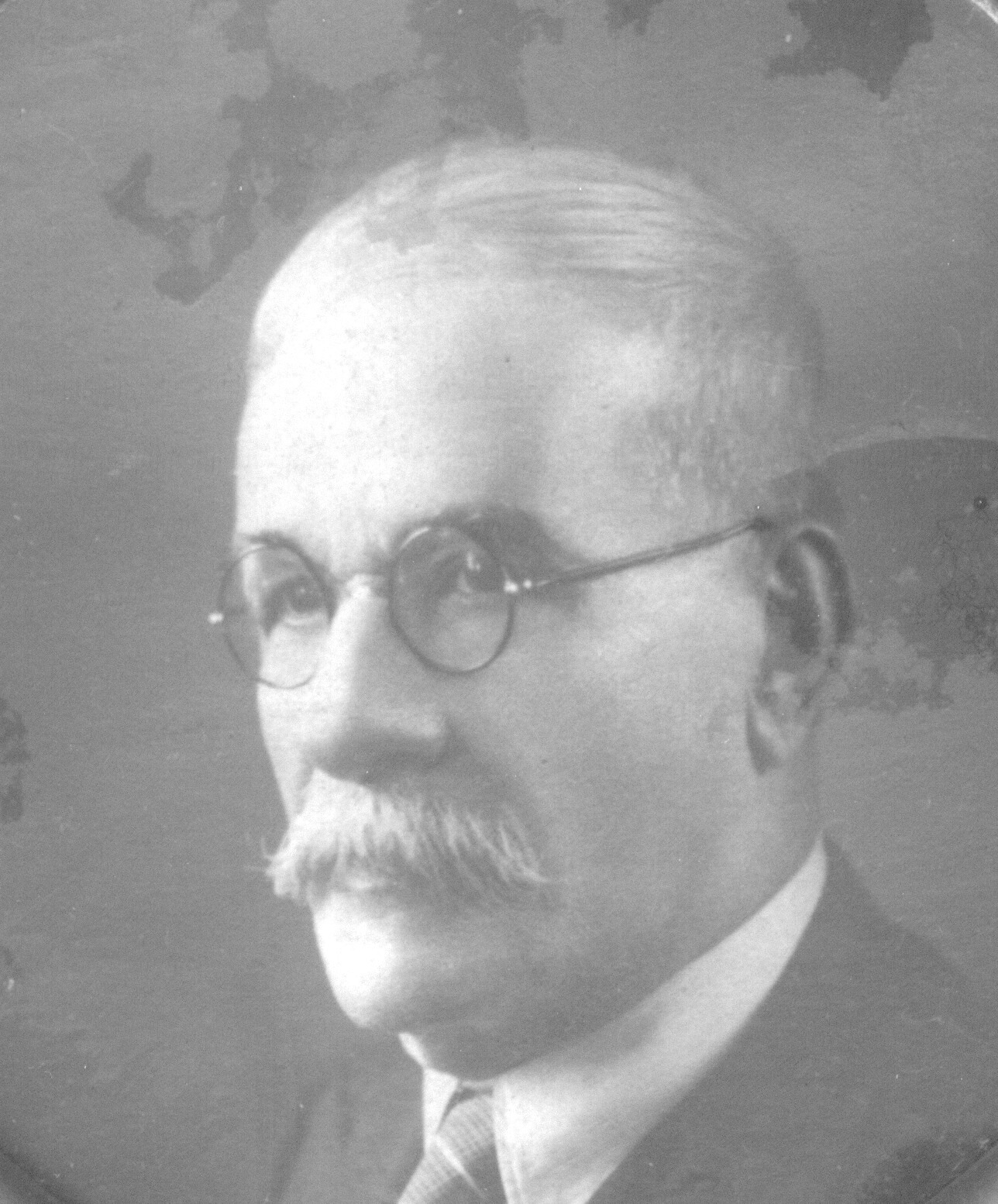

Minister of Public Instruction
- In office 1922–1929

Minister of Internal Affairs
- In office 1929–1931
- President: Juan Vicente Gómez
- Preceded by: Pedro Manuel Arcaya
- Succeeded by: Pedro Rafael Tinoco

Personal details
- Born: 14 March 1875 Capacho, Táchira, Venezuela
- Died: 26 September 1939 (aged 64) Caracas
- Spouse: Vicenta de los Dolores Martínez Vivas

Rubén González Cárdenas (14 March 1875 – 26 August 1939) was a lawyer with an intense early political life in his native State of Táchira between 1899 and 1908. He became Secretary General for the Government; also distinguished himself as House Representative for the National Congress; President for the Legislation Assembly; Minister of Public Instruction (1922–1929) and Minister of Internal Affairs (1929–1931).

== Biography ==
=== Infancy ===
Son to Don Nicolás González Cárdenas, a cattle rancher by trade; and to Doña Eufrasia Cárdenas Cárdenas, Rubén González Cárdenas is born the fourth child of this marital union.

Two months after Rubén González's birth, on 18 May 1875, his home town was destroyed by an earthquake. The whole family survived. After this event, Don Nicolás appears as a founding member for the new town of Capacho, today Independencia. The family generously grants the land in which to build the new town and the González Cárdenas family decides to move to Rancherías, another family property on the way to San Cristobal (Venezuela) where, during the following 7 years, the family would grow with the additional birth of three brothers.

No significant event disturbs Rubén González's rural life. At an early age he went to the Sagrado Corazón de Jesús boarding school, at La Grita. There he will receive education, forged with discipline, and egress a High School Graduate. From this part of his life, three distinct variables will stand out and accompany him for the rest of his life: his extraordinary academic performance, to the point of being considered an exceptionally gifted student; his unbending rebellious character and his relationship with the school's director, Father Jesús Manuel Jáuregui Moreno, who will mark him permanently for his "true pedagogical sense".

"Maybe because of that extraordinary condition of Father Jáuregui’s, his memory in Rubén González was perennial. A picture of his teacher was always on his desk and a bronze bust, which he commissioned around the year 1925. Jáuregui influenced more than anyone in Rubén González’s mind and spirit".

=== Youth ===
González Cárdenas departs for Mérida, supported through enormous economical efforts from his parents, to undergo Law studies at the Universidad de Los Andes (ULA). There, he maintains his condition as an excellent student. In 1895 he is elected by the student body to pronounce the speech in remembrance of Field Marshal Mariscal Antonio José de Sucre's birth at the university's main auditorium. His spoken address is of repercussion in the whole state.

He graduates with top honors as a Lawyer in 1897. He returns to his native state of Táchira, where he will practice law in San Cristóbal. Eager for knowledge, he acquires part of the distinguished Pedro María Morantes' (Pío Gil) library.

=== Children ===
On 26 January 1904, in San Cristóbal he marries his distant cousin Vicenta de los Dolores Martínez Vivas, better known as Doña Dolores, a woman known for her great intelligence, singular tact and sharp tongue. Doña Dolores would outlive Rubén González Cárdenas 26 years until her death on 19 January 1965. From this union four children were born: César, Blanca, Tulia, Elvia and Ana Clotilde.

=== Political life ===
Although he does not participate directly in the regional political battles, Rubén González Cárdenas stays very active in the regional struggle. Analyzing the State's situation and foreseeing no practical achievements he firmly refuses to be involved with political parties. By means of mutual friends, he establishes contacts with General Cipriano Castro, who at the time was in exile, in Colombia.

He remains in the State of Tachira during the year of 1899 joining the Revolución Liberal Restauradora movement and raising the flag: "nuevos hombres, nuevos ideales, nuevos procedimientos". (New men, new ideals, new procedures.) From this time there is evidence of the aid he gave to general Celestino Castro, brother to the Tachira warlord. Once Castro assumes the position of State Provisory President he names González Cárdenas as Secretary General, from (1900-1908), which potentially puts him in charge of Tachira state's administration. “ He drafts documents, announces them, demands compliance to orders, watches over the meager budget allocated to the state (less than Bs. 200,000); is ever watchful of political parties and malcontents, distrusts neighboring borders ”. "He is forced to take severe fiscal measures regarding taxation on liquor and affects powerful people, including President Castro, who in a telegram orders Celestino Castro to separate González Cárdenas from his office. He responds to the telegram, telling him: If I don’t even have the authority to name my own Secretary General, I leave you your Presidency…” Rubén González offers to resign his position, but his resignation is refused. Castro, from Caracas, replies that it wasn't an order, but a "suggestion" and requests Celestino Castro to leave González in his position. This event lends great authority to the lawyer.

Rubén González Cárdenas shows himself as a visionary politician with a broad national sense. In a report delivered to president Cipriano Castro he displays a brilliant mind when he stays "ever watchful to the imminent dangers of uprisings and invasions such as the one Colombia attempted a year later". Furthermore, he worries about “ Venezuela’s international image, the intervention of foreign ventures in the country as he analyses German investments in Tachira state, the very-much desired Tachira railway, telegraph lines and their dire necessity; the problems with smuggling through the Zulia and Catatumbo rivers, and especially, the political problems of the country, focused on the urgent need of educating young men to replace the worn out political parties".

As Cipriano Castro's regime falls, González Cárdenas remains at San Cristobal, where he was falsely accused of participating in a conspiracy movement. He was jailed at Cuartel San Carlos in 1910 and eight months later was set free, thanks to General Régulo Olivares, Military Commander of Arms, who after an investigation was convinced of González Cárdenas' innocence. Immediately President Juan Vicente Gómez ordered his release. He departed for Colombia, where he was exiled at El Escobal, a frontier town near the Venezuela-Colombia Border; where he remained until 1917. During this time, his political struggle continued; in exile he laid down his political ideology in "El Gañan de La Mulera", a series of pamphlets where he continued to confront General Juan Vicente Gómez's government.

"Years later, he confided to me (his son, Dr. César González) that his mistake was leaving for Colombia instead of traveling to Caracas, because President Juan Vicente Gómez had proved that it wasn’t his design to place him in jail…, but his youth, his impulsive character, and his resolve made him take that path".

Some time later Rubén González concludes, demonstrating his acute analytical vision, that the time for civil wars in Venezuela was over, and history would prove him right. This position separates him from the radical pro-Castro groups in exile, who from exile were preparing an armed uprising against Gomez's regime. All this circumstances and his deplorable economical situation, near destitution, makes him take the decision of asking for safe passage to Gomez's government through Román Cárdenas, a relative who was at the time Minister of Internal Revenue.

Upon his arrival to Caracas in 1917, González visits acting Venezuelan President General Gómez, who makes it clear that it was not his idea to imprison him at San Carlos Fort. He also informs him that he is well aware of Gonzalez's views regarding his government, and lets him know his knowledge of opposition activities outside the country; however, González's position, always aligned to the Constitution and the Law, convince the chief of state to freely trust him.

"He begins by providing legal counsel for the Ministry of Internal Revenue, among which was to be become the basis for a legal plea to sustain before the Federal and Cassation Court the constitutionality for the Internal Revenue Laws, a file that had been challenged before this High Court".

He performs as Congressman for his home state of Táchira (1919-1922) and as House of Congress President in two occasions (1920 and 1922). During this same period he serves as Legal Consultant for the Internal Revenue Ministry, and drafts the legal interpretation for the new fiscal laws, particularly ones regarding hydrocarbon taxation.

As a congressman he was not known as a man for debates. He dedicates himself to work in the Commission for the Study of Law Projects and personally drafts some of them. Among them the first National Sanitation Law, which appeared with the fundamentals, and basic and constitutional principles of said branch of the Public Administration.

His hard work at Congress and in the Revenue Ministry allow him to be known as an effective and level-headed politician. He is viewed as a national political asset and thus becomes part of the Executive Cabinet. "It seems they intended to name him as Minister of Public Works in 1922, when General Juan Vicente Gómez once again takes office as president ”, but upon José Ladislao Andara's death, on 5 September 192, Rubén González Cárdenas is named Minister of Public Instruction (today Education Ministry) by Gómez's government.

=== Ministry of Public Education ===
The strategy developed during González Cárdenas stay as Minister represented a milestone in Venezuela's public education due to the great impact he had in this sector.

The problems in education during the Gomez regime were the same that were being dragged from past administrations: lack of adequate infrastructure and graduate schools; low supply of work utensils and furniture, to such extent that "each student in general would have to bring their own chair or stool to school". It is still a school house that "is limited in providing basic knowledge as a consequence of a routine teaching system boring and lacking interest to the students" (Mudarra, 1978, p. 97)

Rubén González Cárdenas understood that "something more than correcting vices in the application of the law and making compliance was needed in order to reach a true and complete organization of the system"(González, cit. por Fernández Heres, 1981, p. 943)

He reorganized the Ministry under that line of thinking and instilled a spirit of order lacking in all other official institutions. He dignified the work of the Teacher, providing security and stability. A small measure of this was that in six years of work (1922 – 1928) wages were increased 140% but demanding reciprocity he insisted professionalizing teaching activities that up till then were basic and rudimentary. This action was fundamental in pushing forward the Venezuelan magisterial.

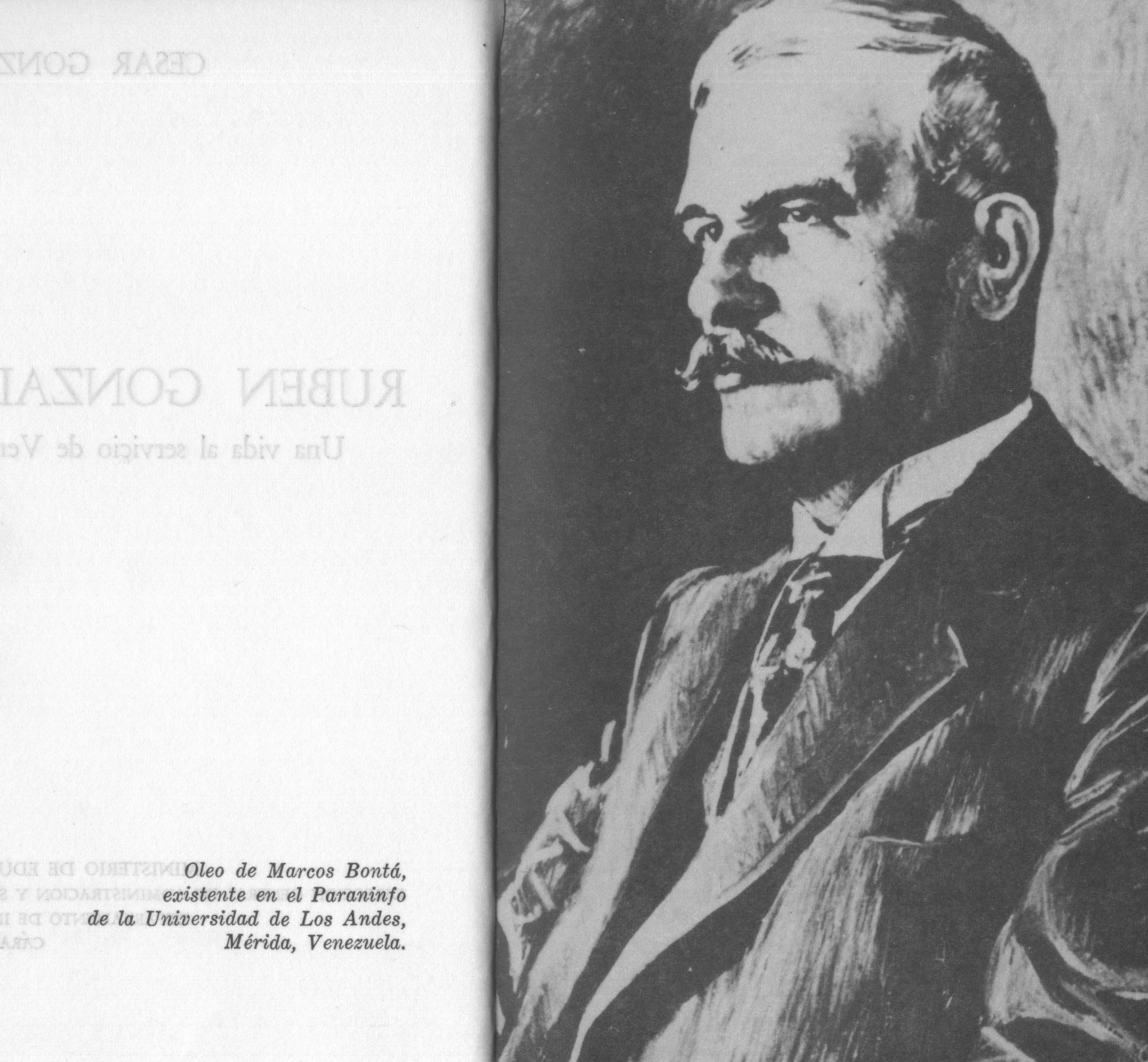
Oil Painting by Marcos Bontá, Universidad de Los Andes, Mérida, Venezuela

A new and successful path was forged that would define the Venezuelan educational system after the plan proposed by Felipe Guevara Rojas. The legislation reform pushed forward by Rubén González was in force for sixteen years until 1940. This reform revolved around the separation of the teaching and evaluation functions implemented in 1914 but "...with a better perspective and judicial criteria, Rubén González makes the Organic Law of Public Instruction declare expressly that the evaluation function that grants official titles and certificates pertains only to the State"

Rubén González Cárdenas was always a guardian of the patriotic interests and as Minister of Public Tuition focused to ennoble the interest of the Nation. He made mandatory the teaching of Venezuela History and Geography, as also Moral and Civic education. " Rubén González enacted a disposition by which the teaching of these programs was reserved for Venezuelan born nationals and other educational matters intimately related with the Republic and its institutions, against the destructive approach that Jesuit teachers were preaching."

Further on in 1924, during the legislative reform, Article No. 13 the Organic Law of Public Instruction states: "Academic courses related with the fundamental principles of the Venezuelan Nation can only be taught by Venezuelans".

With the installment of legislation, a personal project of Rubén González Cárdenas, the anarchy of the so-called "liberal studies" were eliminated and clearly defined the concept of "a liberty of teaching that now would not permit a student practice that presented themselves for examination based on the subscription that any teacher, without certification or necessary elements could apply towards the Ministry of Public Tuition, that made possible lawyers, doctors, engineers, etc, graduating in less than two years"

Of his personal work stands out a particular decree that establishes two hundred (200) elementary schools and a few months later thirty (3) graduate schools in a country with a population of 3 million citizens. He grants the ULA (Universidad de Los Andes) with new buildings and labs, and through a decree reopens the school where he studied, today the Liceo Militar Jáuregui.

Another episode as Minister of Public Instruction that marked Rubén González Cárdenas unbreakable character happened in 1924, the Secretary General of the Presidency called him to office and presented a letter where Archbishop Felipe Rincón presses the government to "include a Christian doctrine as one of the required courses in elementary, primary and high school, and to exempt from it those children whose parents or guardians declare that they will provide such teachings personally"; In that letter he was informed that by Presidential decision he should incorporate these dispositions into the memorandums of law drafted and almost ready. González Cárdenas immediately reacted towards a demand that he considered unconstitutional and in a meeting with President Gómez told him: "General, it will be as you demand, but you will have to appoint a new Public Tuition Minister to sign them because this goes against my judicial convictions".

In 1928 a university student uprising bursts that intends to outs President Gomez from power; notwithstanding, González Cárdenas was firmly opposed that the forces of public order enter the university and protected those students that were to be expelled for reasons different than tuition related matters.

He fought for a Venezuelan school system that would definitely shift away from the colonial yoke. This action is the synthesis of who Rubén González was: a patriot through and through. On 19 April 1929 he assumes the role as new Minister of the Interior, position that he would occupy until 13 July 1931. He started his appointment in the middle of great political turmoil as when General Juan Vicente Gomez finishes his presidential period in 1929 he decide to retire and leave for his home in Maracay.

=== Ministry of Interior ===
Although he was not made aware, all pointed that Rubén González Cárdenas would be the next Minister of Internal Affairs (Minister of The Interior) and as thus was ratified in a sealed letter that President Gomez sent Juan Bautista Pérez with the new appointments. On 3 May Congress meets to elect the new Constitutional President where in a unanimous decision General Juan Vicente Gómez is elected for the next period (1929-1936). According to protocol the President of Congress, General Rafael Cayama Martínez, by telegram, communicates Gómez the decision taken by the Legislative Power. One day later, on 4 May, both Chambers convey to hear the negative by Gómez to assume the First Magistrate of the country by saying: “… I will always and on all occasions be with our country and its legitimate representatives, and be useful to the homeland when needing of my services"

Since 22 April, Rubén González had been assigned, in absolute secrecy, to draft a partial Constitutional reform that added four transitory dispositions where Congress could elect a Commander in Chief and the President of the Republic. With swift action the reform was enacted and on 31 May Juan Bautista Pérez was elected president and Juan Vicente Gómez commander in chief.

On taking office Rubén González reorganizes the ministry and adds a new director as one was insufficient. He continued organizing the offices that depended on his Ministry, such as: registers, leprosy institution, and tribunals among others. Resources were very limited for the many needs. His approach followed that of Minister of Public Education and he made his theme: "Vitalize the National feeling" and worked hard and steady to obtain it. "He was worried by the frontiers and created police stations bringing the authority of State to all far reaches of the country. He provided resources to the Leprosy institutions improving conditions in the colonies. He applied a firm stance with foreigners; erected in Caracas a statue in Caracas to Andrés Bello and thus paying him a secular debt. He put special attention in commemorative acts: 100 years of the reconstruction of the Republic and death of Simon Bolivar."

He gave special attention to the priests in frontier parishes as they were in majority in foreign hands. He met many times with Bishops to change this situation but was not heard and in defense of his ideas confronts the Church, he was then deemed anticlerical and of lacking religious principles which was not the case. He then took a radical decision, to apply the dispositions in the Ecclesiastic Patronage Law, that orders that priests in parishes must be of Venezuelan nationality. In August 1929, Rubén González starts to have strong differences with other members of the Executive Cabinet. His character, resolution, energy and tenacity made him an element that could no be molded. He never folded to factions and in his resolve to uphold the Law ended up antagonizing government high-ranking officers. Due to the Nation's confrontation with the Church, in a Minister's Council, Pérez is determined to sign an executive decree that expels Valencia Bishop Monsignor Salvador Montes de Oca, that created public differences with church hierarchy and a diplomatic intervention by the Apostolic Nuncio.

In parallel, Rubén González set out the task to encode and set laws that unfortunately was not able to promote. He created and directed a commission of famed jurists that would have the chore to reform applicable laws of the time, but was not endorsed. After political pressure that brought back General Juan Vicente Gómez to the presidency, on 13 June Congress receives a letter from Juan Bautista Pérez where he resigns and the position is taken by Pedro Itriago Chacín, then Minister of Foreign Affairs of the past regime. Congress reverts the transitory decree so that military command takes back the full power of the State. On 13 July 1931, General Juan Vicente Gómez swears in before Congress as President of the Republic and as foreseen changes the Cabinet. Even though Rubén González is separated from the Ministry of the Interior he receives demonstrations of support and friendship and this would not surprise anyone; the relationship between Gómez and Rubén González Cárdenas was forged by many years of respect for each other. In an interview, Arturo Uslar Pietri tells that Rubén González enters General Gómez office to report and on his desk there is a pamphlet of "El Gañan de la Mulera" and Gómez tells him: "someone that is not your friend brought this to me, but do not worry doctor, you wrote this when we were not friends, now we are friends and this does not matter anymore"

Rubén González Cárdenas delivers his end of term report at Congress in 1931 and passes his appointment to his successor doctor Pedro Rafael Tinoco. This turns out to be a hard time because after a well deserved rest he finds himself with too much free time. he voluntarily goes into seclusion as he finds out that a silent struggle is against him. He is saved from persecution due to his relationship with General Juan Vicente Gómez. He saw little of him after he left office, but was pleased on the reception and attention he would get from him. They wanted to keep him away from the homeland, but only went to Europe in 1934 for medical reasons that later took his life. He worried on Venezuela and the declining of President Gómez, even so he never took part in power plays in favor or against him. In 1936 he is included in a list of respondents that hurt him deeply. He ignored the situation to the point that he forbid family and friends to respond in his defense or inspect records or files, many of his assets were seized by political enemies.

=== Awards and recognitions ===
- Venezuela: Orden del Libertador, Gran Cordón and Medalla de Honor de Instrucción Pública de los Estados Unidos de Venezuela.
- France: Orden de la Legión de Honor, en el grado de Comendador.
- University of Los Andes: Oil painting by Marcos Bontá is shown in the Main Assembly Hall in Mérida, ULA.
- Schools with his name: "Liceo Rubén González" in Guarenas; Estado Miranda. 1ero de febrero de 1947. El Dr. Ramón J. Velásquez, Academy of History gives a speech commemorating Dr. González Cárdenas.
- A bronze bust of Rubén González Cárdenas made in 1974 by Spanish sculptor José Chicharro Gamo. Inaugurated by Minister of Education, Dr. Luis Manuel Peñalver.
- In Capacho, native land of Rubén González Cárdenas, a school is created, el "Grupo Escolar Rubén González" Municipality Independencia Distrito Capacho, del Estado Táchira.

=== Academic homage ===
On 12 March 1975 the Academy of Political and Social Sciences celebrates the 100 anniversary of the birth Rubén González Cárdenas. At the palace of the academy a speech is given by doctor Tulio Chiossone Villamizar chair of the corporation, Secretary General of the Presidency of the Republic under the government of President General Eleazar López Contreras and ex Minister of Interior Affairs.

== See also ==
- List of ministers of interior of Venezuela
