= César Jiménez =

César Jiménez may refer to:

- César Jiménez (diver) (born 1959), Dominican diver
- César Tiberio Jiménez (born 1969), Mexican racing driver
- César Jiménez (footballer) (born 1977), Spanish footballer
- César Jiménez (baseball) (born 1984), Venezuelan baseball player
