= Carmelo Yuste =

Spanish footballer

Personal information
- Full name: Carmelo Yuste Yuste
- Date of birth: 3 February 1984 (age 42)
- Place of birth: Teruel, Spain
- Height: 1.77 m (5 ft 9 1/2 in)
- Position: Midfielder

Youth career
- Zaragoza

Senior career*
Years	Team	Apps	(Gls)
2003–2004	Universidad Zaragoza	25	(2)
2004–2007	Zaragoza B	93	(4)
2007–2009	Eibar	47	(0)
2009–2010	Alcorcón	25	(1)
2010–2011	APOP	14	(0)
2011–2012	Palencia	31	(0)
2012–2013	Borja	15	(1)
2013	Atlético Ceuta	9	(0)
2013–2014	Sariñena	25	(1)
2014–2015	Andorra	10	(1)
2015	Boiro	11	(0)
2015–2016	Teruel	7	(1)
2016	Brea		
2016–2018	Borja	?	(1)
2018–2019	Alfaro	8	(0)
Total		320+	(12)
- * Club domestic league appearances and goals

Carmelo Yuste Yuste (born 3 February 1984) is a Spanish former professional footballer who played as a midfielder.

== Club career ==
Born in Teruel, Aragon, Yuste totalled 47 Segunda División games over two seasons with SD Eibar. He also played professionally in Cyprus.

Yuste's first appearance in the second tier took place on 25 August 2007, when he featured the full 90 minutes of a 1–1 away draw against Racing de Ferrol. The following season ended in relegation.
