= David Soto =

Spanish footballer (born 1993)

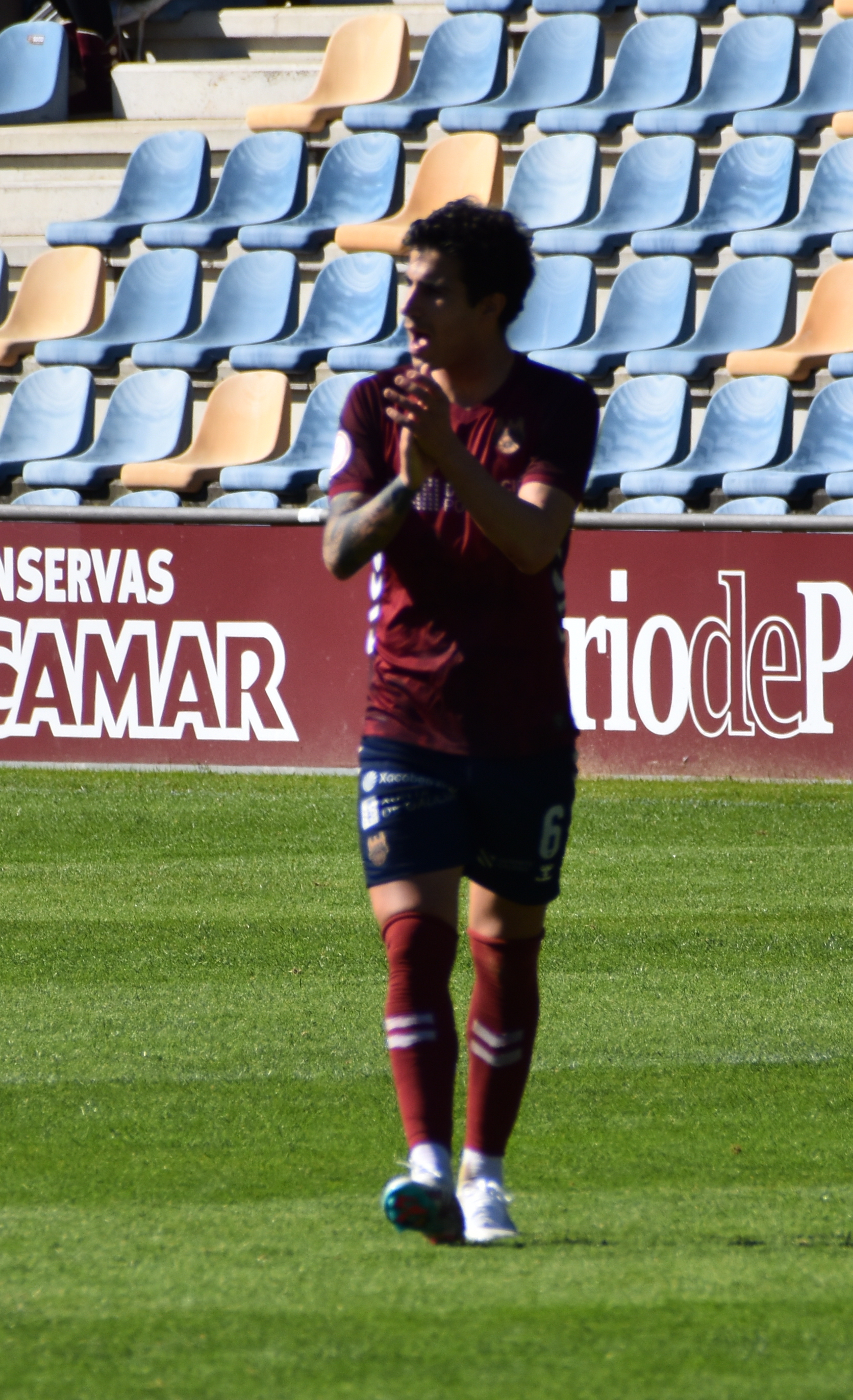

Personal information
- Full name: David Soto Sánchez
- Date of birth: 16 October 1993 (age 33)
- Place of birth: Ourense, Spain
- Height: 1.81 m (5 ft 11 in)
- Position: Centre-back

Team information
- Current team: Intercity
- Number: 4

Youth career
- 2009–2012: Celta

Senior career*
Years	Team	Apps	(Gls)
2010–2015	Celta B	86	(0)
2011	Celta	1	(0)
2015–2016	Almería B	12	(0)
2016–2017	Boiro	17	(0)
2017–2018	Cerceda	37	(0)
2018–2019	Lorca	31	(0)
2019–2021	Compostela	50	(3)
2021–2023	Pontevedra	66	(1)
2023–2025	Compostela	60	(2)
2025–2026	Conquense	16	(0)
2026–	Intercity	11	(0)
- * Club domestic league appearances and goals as of 16 May 2026

David Soto Sánchez (born 16 October 1993) is a Spanish footballer who plays for Segunda Federación club Intercity as a centre-back.

== Club career ==
Born in Ourense, Galicia, Soto played youth football with local Celta de Vigo. Still a junior, he and made his senior debuts with the reserves in the 2009–10 season, in Segunda División B.

On 4 June 2011 Soto appeared in his first game as a professional, starting in a 3–0 home win against FC Cartagena in the Segunda División championship. It was his only appearance with the main squad, however.

On 5 August 2015 Soto moved to another reserve team, UD Almería B also in the third tier. The following 13 July, he signed for CD Boiro.

== Career statistics ==
=== Club ===
As of match played 14 February 2021

Appearances and goals by club, season and competition
Club	Season	League			National Cup		Other		Total	
Club	Season	Division	Apps	Goals	Apps	Goals	Apps	Goals	Apps	Goals
Celta B	2009–10	Segunda División B	1	0	—		—		1	0
Celta B	2010–11	Segunda División B	5	0	—		—		5	0
Celta B	2011–12	Segunda División B	4	0	—		—		4	0
Celta B	2012–13	Tercera División	16	0	—		1 (Note: Appearance(s) in Tercera División Promotion)	0	17	0
Celta B	2013–14	Segunda División B	32	0	—		—		32	0
Celta B	2014–15	Segunda División B	28	0	—		—		28	0
Celta B	Total		86	0	0	0	1	0	87	0
Celta	2010–11	Segunda División	1	0	0	0	—		1	0
Almería B	2015–16	Segunda División B	12	0	—		—		12	0
Boiro	2016–17	Segunda División B	17	0	1	0	—		18	0
Cerceda	2017–18	Segunda División B	37	0	—		—		37	0
Lorca	2018–19	Tercera División	31	0	2	0	1	0	34	0
Compostela	2019–20	Tercera División	25	1	—		—		25	1
Compostela	2020–21	Segunda División B	13	0	0	0	—		13	0
Compostela	Total		38	1	0	0	0	0	38	1
Career total			222	1	3	0	2	0	227	1
