= Patricio Guillén =

Uruguayan footballer (born 1984)

Pato Guillén
Personal information
- Full name: Patricio Damián Guillén Gandini
- Date of birth: 28 December 1984 (age 41)
- Place of birth: Montevideo, Uruguay
- Height: 1.80 m (5 ft 11 in)
- Position: Goalkeeper

Team information
- Current team: Ourense CF
- Number: 13

Youth career
- River Plate Montevideo

Senior career*
| Years | Team | Apps | (Gls) |
| 2003–2007 | River Plate Montevideo | 33 | (0) |
| 2007–2008 | Cerro | 6 | (0) |
| 2008–2009 | Racing de Montevideo | 1 | (0) |
| 2009–2010 | Atlético Monzón | 36 | (0) |
| 2010 | Binéfar | 0 | (0) |
| 2010–2011 | La Muela | 8 | (0) |
| 2011–2014 | CD Ourense | 103 | (0) |
| 2014–2015 | Barakaldo | 33 | (0) |
| 2015–2016 | Compostela | 36 | (0) |
| 2016–2017 | Boiro | 35 | (0) |
| 2017–2019 | UD Ourense | 74 | (0) |
| 2019–2024 | Compostela | 141 | (0) |
| 2024– | Ourense CF | 5 | (0) |
- * Club domestic league appearances and goals as of 10 June 2025

Patricio Damián Guillén Gandini (born 28 December 1984) is a Uruguayan footballer who plays as a goalkeeper for Spanish Primera Federación club Ourense CF.

== Career ==
On 1 July 2024, Guillén signed with Ourense CF in the third-tier Primera Federación, after previously playing for two other clubs from the same city, CD Ourense and UD Ourense.

== Career statistics ==
As of match played 14 February 2021

Appearances and goals by club, season and competition
| Club | Season | League | | | National cup | | Other | | Total | |
| Club | Season | Division | Apps | Goals | Apps | Goals | Apps | Goals | Apps | Goals |
|---|---|---|---|---|---|---|---|---|---|---|
| River Plate Montevideo | 2005–06 | Uruguayan Primera División | 19 | 0 | — | | — | | 19 | 0 |
| River Plate Montevideo | 2006–07 | Uruguayan Primera División | 14 | 0 | — | | — | | 14 | 0 |
| River Plate Montevideo | Total | | 33 | 0 | 0 | 0 | 0 | 0 | 33 | 0 |
| Cerro | 2006–07 | Uruguayan Primera División | 0 | 0 | — | | — | | 0 | 0 |
| Cerro | 2007–08 | Uruguayan Primera División | 6 | 0 | — | | — | | 6 | 0 |
| Cerro | Total | | 6 | 0 | 0 | 0 | 0 | 0 | 6 | 0 |
| Racing Club | 2008–09 | Uruguayan Primera División | 1 | 0 | — | | — | | 1 | 0 |
| Atlético Monzón | 2009–10 | Tercera División | ? | ? | — | | — | | 0 | 0 |
| Binéfar | 2010–11 | Tercera División | ? | ? | — | | — | | 0 | 0 |
| La Muela | 2010–11 | Segunda División B | 8 | 0 | — | | — | | 8 | 0 |
| Ourense | 2011–12 | Tercera División | ? | ? | — | | — | | 0 | 0 |
| Ourense | 2012–13 | Segunda División B | 36 | 0 | 1 | 0 | — | | 37 | 0 |
| Ourense | 2013–14 | Segunda División B | 29 | 0 | — | | — | | 29 | 0 |
| Ourense | Total | | ? | 0 | 1 | 0 | 0 | 0 | ? | 0 |
| Barakaldo | 2014–15 | Segunda División B | 33 | 0 | 1 | 0 | — | | 34 | 0 |
| Compostela | 2015–16 | Segunda División B | 36 | 0 | 1 | 0 | — | | 37 | 0 |
| Boiro | 2016–17 | Segunda División B | 35 | 0 | — | | — | | 35 | 0 |
| UD Ourense | 2017–18 | Preferente Sur Gallega | 36 | 0 | — | | — | | 36 | 0 |
| UD Ourense | 2018–19 | Tercera División | 38 | 0 | — | | — | | 38 | 0 |
| UD Ourense | Total | | 74 | 0 | 0 | 0 | 0 | 0 | 74 | 0 |
| Compostela | 2019–20 | Tercera División | 30 | 0 | — | | — | | 30 | 0 |
| Compostela | 2020–21 | Segunda División B | 14 | 0 | 1 | 0 | — | | 15 | 0 |
| Compostela | Total | | 44 | 0 | 1 | 0 | 0 | 0 | 45 | 0 |
| Career total | | | ? | 0 | 4 | 0 | 0 | 0 | ? | 0 |
