= CD La Muela =

Spanish association football club

La Muela
- Full name: Club Deportivo La Muela
- Founded: 2005
- Dissolved: 2011
- Ground: Clemente Padilla, La Muela, Aragon, Spain
- Capacity: 1,500
- 2010–11: Segunda División B – Group 2, 17th
Home colours	Away colours

Club Deportivo La Muela was a Spanish football team based in La Muela, in the autonomous community of Aragon. Founded in 2005 and dissolved in 2011, it held home games at Clemente Padilla, with a 1,500-seat capacity.

== History ==
Founded in 2005, La Muela first reached the fourth division in 2008, promoting to the third level after only two seasons in the category after ranking second in its group.

In 2010–11 the club finished 17th in group II, being immediately relegated back. Furthermore, before the new season began, it was demoted two divisions, landing in Segunda Regional; shortly after however, it dissolved.

== Season to season ==
Season	Tier	Division	Place	Copa del Rey
2005–06	7	2ª Reg.	1st	
2006–07	6	1ª Reg.	1st	
2007–08	5	Reg. Pref.	1st	
2008–09	4	3ª	4th	
2009–10	4	3ª	2nd	
2010–11	3	2ª B	17th	

- 1 season in Segunda División B
- 2 seasons in Tercera División

== Famous players ==
- (Serbia) Goran Drulić
- (Spain) Moisés
- (Spain) David Mainz
- (Spain) Jorge Zaparaín
- (Equatorial Guinea) Manuel Sima
- (Spain) Pablo Rodríguez
- (Spain) Javi Suárez
- (Uruguay) Patricio Guillén
