= Gerard Piqué =

Spanish footballer (born 1987)

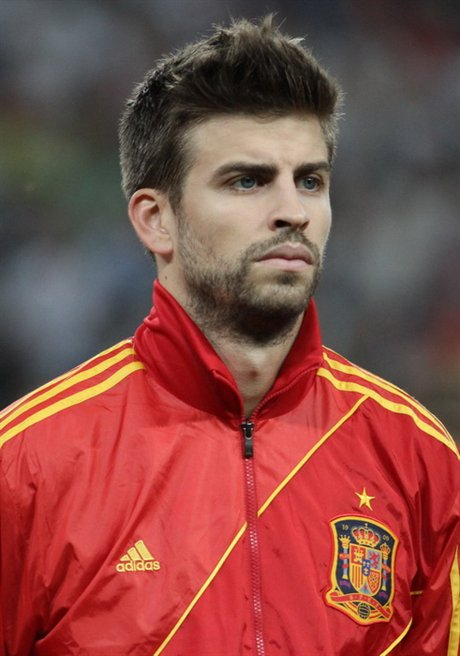
- Piqué with Spain in 2012

Personal information
- Full name: Gerard Piqué Bernabeu
- Date of birth: 2 February 1987 (age 39)
- Place of birth: Barcelona, Spain
- Height: 1.94 m (6 ft 4 in)
- Position: Centre-back

Youth career
- 1997–2004: Barcelona
- 2004: Manchester United

Senior career*
Years	Team	Apps	(Gls)
2004–2008	Manchester United	12	(0)
2006–2007	→ Zaragoza (loan)	22	(2)
2008–2022	Barcelona	397	(29)
Total		431	(31)

International career
2002–2003	Spain U16	7	(2)
2004	Spain U17	8	(3)
2006	Spain U19	8	(3)
2007	Spain U20	5	(1)
2006–2008	Spain U21	12	(1)
2009–2018	Spain	102	(5)
2008–2019	Catalonia	10	(0)
Medal record
Men's football
Representing Spain
FIFA World Cup
Winner	2010
UEFA European Championship
Winner	2012
FIFA Confederations Cup
Runner-up	2013
Third place	2009
UEFA European Under-19 Championship
Winner	2006
UEFA European Under-17 Championship
Runner-up	2004
- * Club domestic league appearances and goals

Gerard Piqué Bernabeu (Note: Catalan: [ʒəˈɾaɾt piˈke βəɾnəˈβew], Spanish: [ɟʝeˈɾaɾ piˈke βeɾnaˈβew]) (born 2 February 1987) is a Spanish former professional footballer who played as a centre-back. He is considered to be one of the greatest defenders of his generation and is one of the most decorated players with 37 trophies. In 2022, Piqué founded the Kings League sports league based in Spain and eventually across several countries and regions.

Initially a talented student athlete at Barcelona's La Masia academy, Piqué began his professional career with Manchester United in 2004. He returned to Barcelona in 2008 and helped the club win trebles in 2008–09 and 2014–15. He appeared in 616 competitive matches for the club and won 31 major club titles, including nine La Liga trophies and three UEFA Champions League titles. He is one of only four players to have won the Champions League two years in a row with different teams, the others being Marcel Desailly, Paulo Sousa, and Samuel Eto'o. In November 2022, Piqué announced his retirement from football at the age of 35.

Piqué also represented Spain 102 times, making his debut on 11 February 2009. He played an integral role on the Spanish teams that won the 2010 FIFA World Cup and UEFA Euro 2012. He retired from the national team after the 2018 FIFA World Cup.

== Club career ==
=== Early life and career ===
Gerard Piqué Bernabeu was born on 2 February 1987 in Barcelona, Catalonia. He started his career playing for Barcelona's youth teams as a defensive midfielder, but before he signed his first professional contract with the club, he decided to join Manchester United. The Premier League club did not pay a fee for Piqué as he was too young to have a professional contract.

=== Manchester United ===
Piqué made his debut for Manchester United on 26 October 2004, as a centre-back, a 67th minute replacement for John O'Shea in a 3–0 win against Crewe Alexandra in the League Cup. He made his full debut on 8 January 2005 in a 0–0 draw with Exeter City in the FA Cup. Piqué made his Premier League debut on 15 October 2005, again as a substitute for O'Shea, in a 3–1 win over Sunderland. His first league start came on 29 March 2006 against West Ham United at Old Trafford, playing at right-back, as Gary Neville was unavailable due to injury.

His performances, most notably in the reserve team, earned him a new contract, which he signed in February 2005, to run until the summer of 2009. On 4 August 2006, however, La Liga club Real Zaragoza secured Piqué on a season-long-loan. The terms of the loan required Piqué to feature in at least 20 games for the Aragonese club, which he did, as he made 22 first team appearances in a successful spell, alongside Argentine Gabriel Milito, either as a centre-back or a defensive midfielder.

On 5 May 2007, it was announced that Piqué would be staying at Old Trafford for the following season. Manager Alex Ferguson had intended to assess Piqué's form at La Romareda on 6 May, prior to a meeting where the two parties would discuss Piqué's future prospects with the club. However, Ferguson was unable to attend because of airline difficulties.

Piqué's return to Old Trafford saw him make nine league appearances during the 2007–08 season. In his first start in the UEFA Champions League, a 4–0 home win against Dynamo Kyiv on 7 November 2007, Piqué scored the first of Manchester United's four goals in that match. In doing so, he became the 450th player to score at least one goal for the club. His second goal for the club also came in the Champions League, in an away match against Roma on 12 December 2007.

=== Return to Barcelona ===
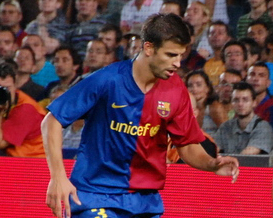
Piqué playing for Barcelona in 2008

On 27 May 2008, Piqué signed a four-year contract with Barcelona, with a €5 million buy-out clause. Barcelona paid a £5 million fee for the player. He expressed his joy at re-signing with his boyhood club, although he admitted he had enjoyed his spell at Manchester United:

I am very happy to be back, I didn't think I would be here again but this is very good for me. Manchester United is a great club and I enjoyed winning things. To play with world class players has helped me and now I want to continue this at Barça.

Piqué's first goal for Barcelona came in the club's 5–2 UEFA Champions League win at Sporting CP on 26 November. His first domestic goal for the club followed two months later, on 29 January 2009, in a Copa del Rey match against local rivals Espanyol. The goal, which came from a corner-kick in the 57th minute, turned out to be the game winner in a 3–2 victory for Barcelona. On 2 May, Piqué scored Barcelona's sixth goal in a 6–2 El Clásico win against Real Madrid at the Santiago Bernabéu.

On 13 May, he picked up the first trophy of his Barcelona career as he helped his club to a 4–1 victory over Athletic Bilbao in the Copa del Rey final. Three days later, Barcelona clinched the 2008–09 La Liga title after Real Madrid lost 3–2 to Villarreal, with two games left in the season. On 27 May, Piqué played against his former club Manchester United in the 2009 UEFA Champions League final, which Barcelona won 2–0 in Rome, completing a historic treble and becoming the first Spanish club to achieve this feat.

On 19 December 2009, Piqué was in the Barcelona squad which beat Argentine club Estudiantes 2–1 in the 2009 FIFA Club World Cup final at Abu Dhabi to complete an unprecedented sextuple. Piqué assisted Pedro's 89th minute equalising goal which took the match to extra-time. On 26 February 2010, Piqué signed a contract extension to keep him at Barcelona until at least summer 2015. On 28 April, Piqué scored in Barcelona's 1–0 Champions League semi-final second leg victory against Inter Milan, though his team went out 3–2 on aggregate.

On 7 December 2010, Piqué captained his first match for Barcelona, which ended a 5–0 victory against Russian Premier League club Rubin Kazan at Camp Nou in the last Champions League group stage match, in the absence of regular captain Carles Puyol and vice-captain Xavi. On 28 May 2011, Piqué played in his second UEFA Champions League final. Barcelona defeated Manchester United 3–1 at Wembley Stadium to lift the UEFA Champions League for the second time in three seasons.

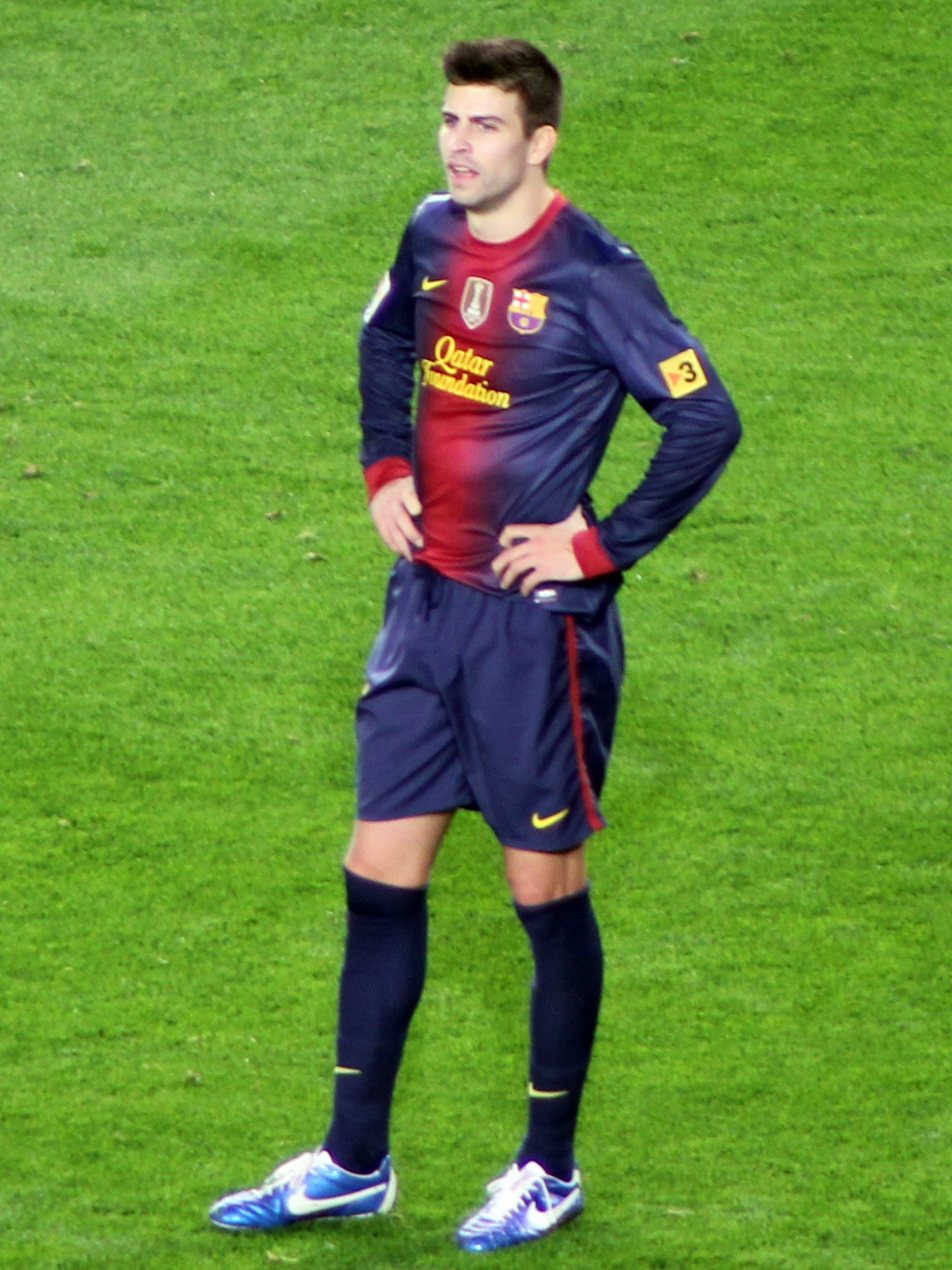
Piqué playing for Barcelona in 2012

Piqué started in Barcelona's 4–0 victory against Brazilian club Santos in the 2011 FIFA Club World Cup final in Yokohama on 18 December. On 20 May 2014, Piqué signed a contract extension with Barcelona, keeping him at the club until 2019.

Piqué started for Barcelona in the 2015 UEFA Champions League final on 6 June, as the club won its fifth European Cup/UEFA Champions League title by beating Juventus 3–1 at Berlin's Olympiastadion. This made Barcelona the first club in history to win the treble of domestic league, domestic cup, and European Cup twice. Piqué, Xavi, Lionel Messi, Andrés Iniesta, Sergio Busquets, Dani Alves, and Pedro are the only players to have been a part of both treble-winning teams. On 20 December 2015, Piqué played in the 2015 FIFA Club World Cup final against Argentine club River Plate in Yokohama, with Barcelona winning 3–0.

Piqué extended his contract again on 18 January 2018, this time until 2022. On 25 August 2019, he played for a full 90 minutes in a 5–2 win against Real Betis, his 500th game for the club. On 20 October 2020, Piqué signed a contract extension that would keep him at the club until 20 June 2024, setting his buy-out clause at €500 million. On 3 March 2021, Piqué scored a last-minute header in the Copa del Rey semi-finals against Sevilla, tying the aggregate score to send the game to extra time. Barcelona won the game 3–0 in extra time and advanced to the 2021 Copa del Rey final, which the team won.

On 3 November 2022, Piqué announced that he would retire following Barcelona's La Liga match against Almería on 5 November. Starting as captain, he was substituted off to a standing ovation in the 83rd minute of Barcelona's 2–0 win. For the celebrations, Barcelona players wore special shirts with Piqué's name and number 3 on the back and "SEMPR3" printed on the front (sempre, Catalan for always). La Liga president Javier Tebas stated he had no doubt that Piqué would one day return and become a "great president of Barcelona". Piqué was still on the squad list, named as a substitute, for the final match before the 2022 FIFA World Cup, away against Osasuna on 8 November; he was given a straight red card from the bench at half time after arguing with the referee over the second-yellow red card given to teammate Robert Lewandowski in the first half.

== International career ==
=== Youth teams ===
Piqué was a member of the Spain under-19 team that won the 2006 UEFA European Under-19 Championship in Poland. In a 2–1 final win against Scotland, Piqué put in a strong performance in defence and also contributed in attack, hitting the crossbar with a header and providing the assist for striker Alberto Bueno to score Spain's second goal.

Subsequently, he played in the 2007 FIFA U-20 World Cup, starting all six of Spain's matches and scoring a goal in the team's come-from-behind 4–2 victory over Brazil in the round of 16. However, Piqué missed the deciding penalty in the shoot-out against the Czech Republic, and Spain was eliminated at the quarter-final stage.

=== Senior side ===
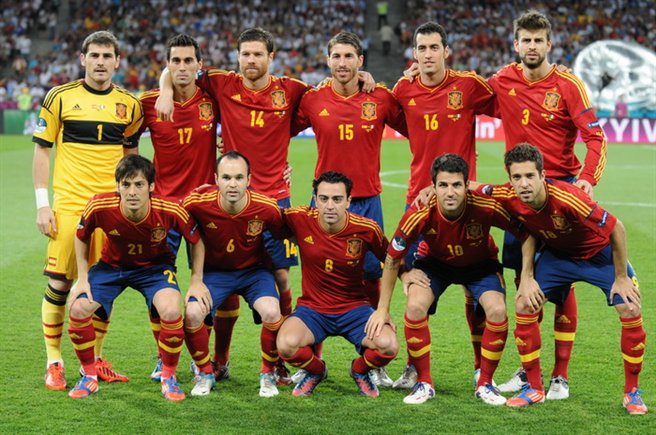
Piqué (back row, first from right) lining up before the UEFA Euro 2012 final

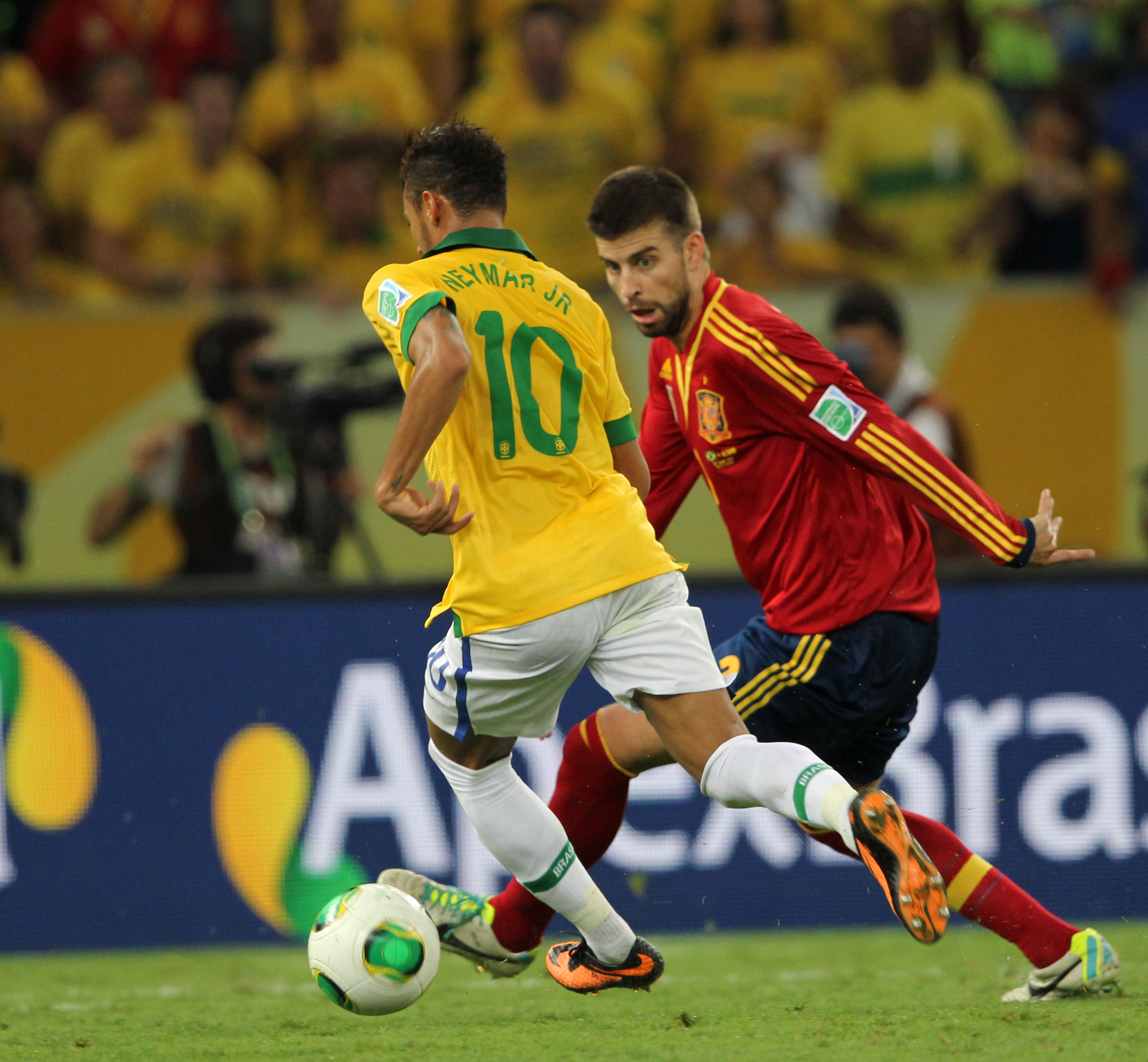
Piqué (right) in action for Spain in the 2013 FIFA Confederations Cup final

On 6 February 2009, Piqué was called up to the senior squad for the friendly against England on 11 February. He played the entire match in a 2–0 win, in Seville. In his second match as an international on 28 March 2009, he was called up as a replacement for injured teammate Carles Puyol and he scored the only goal in Spain's victory in the 2010 World Cup qualifier against Turkey at the Santiago Bernabéu in Madrid. Four days later, he started in Istanbul in a 2–1 win, also in the group stage. Piqué made his tournament debut for Spain at the 2009 FIFA Confederations Cup, starting in four of the team's five matches as La Roja finished in third place.

Piqué was Spain's first-choice centre-back at the 2010 World Cup finals in South Africa, playing alongside Puyol. He started all seven matches and played all minutes as Spain won the tournament, defeating the Netherlands 1–0 in the final. Piqué's partnership with Puyol saw Spain concede only twice in seven World Cup matches and keep four consecutive clean sheets in the knockout stage. In Spain's 1–0 group stage defeat to Switzerland, just before Gelson Fernandes scored the only goal of the game, Swiss striker Eren Derdiyok tumbled over Spain goalkeeper Iker Casillas and accidentally kicked Piqué in the face, knocking him over and leaving him with a deep cut beside his right eye.

Piqué played every minute of Spain's UEFA Euro 2012 campaign, partnering Sergio Ramos in the centre of defence. He successfully converted the team's third penalty in a semi-final shoot-out win over Portugal. In the final, Spain recorded a fifth consecutive clean sheet in a 4–0 win over Italy. Piqué was one of three Spanish defenders included in UEFA's Team of the Tournament as La Roja conceded only one goal in six matches.

At the 2013 FIFA Confederations Cup, Piqué was the third of Spain's seven successful takers in a 7–6 shootout win over Italy at the semi-final stage. On 30 June 2013, Piqué was sent off during the final against Brazil. He received a straight red card in the 68th minute for a violent tackle on recently signed Barcelona teammate Neymar. The match finished 3–0 to Brazil, ending Spain's world record 29 match unbeaten run in competitive internationals.

Piqué later participated in the 2014 FIFA World Cup, with Spain seen as favorites to win again. The squad would underperform greatly, losing 5-1 in their opening game, a rematch with the Netherlands. This would be his only appearance in the tournament as he suffered a facial injury during the match and was kept on the bench indefinitely. Spain would be eliminated in the group stage marking the beginning of the end for the Spain’s golden generation.

In Spain's opening group game of UEFA Euro 2016 on 13 June, Piqué scored his fifth goal for his country, a late header in a 1–0 victory against the Czech Republic.

In Spain's second group match of the 2018 FIFA World Cup on 20 June, a 1–0 win against Iran, Piqué made his 100th international appearance. On 11 August 2018, Piqué announced his retirement from international football.

On 25 March 2019, Piqué won his 10th cap for Catalonia in a friendly match against Venezuela, a few months after he had retired from the Spanish national team and led the team to a 2–1 victory.

== Style of play ==
Piqué was a modern and commanding defender, who combined strength and tackling ability with passing. Although he was primarily deployed as a centre-back, he was a tactically versatile player who was capable of playing as a defensive midfielder, a position in which he was initially deployed in his youth; he was also deployed as a sweeper on occasion, showing similarities to German legend Franz Beckenbauer, thus earning the sobriquet "Piquénbauer". He was also occasionally known to use his height as an additional attacking threat by advancing into more offensive positions, often functioning as an auxiliary striker, particularly if his team were trailing late on during matches. His ball-playing ability and capacity to read the game enabled him to form an effective central-defensive partnership with the more physical Carles Puyol, both with Barcelona and Spain. Despite his talent in his youth, he was initially accused by certain pundits of being error-prone defensively, and has been criticised on occasion for his inconsistency and lack of pace. Considered to be one of the best defenders in world football by pundits, in 2018, Piqué's former defensive partner Puyol described him as "the best centre-back in the world" due to his personal development as a player in terms of his intelligence, leadership, positional sense, composure, and anticipation.

== Personal life ==
Piqué was raised in a Catalan family. His father, Joan, is a businessman, and his mother, Montserrat, is the director of a spinal injuries hospital in Barcelona. He has a younger brother, Marc. His grandfather, Amador Bernabeu, is a former vice-president of Barcelona. During the 2017 Catalan independence referendum, he was seen by many as one of the public faces of the pro-independence movement, voting and tweeting his support in Catalan. He subsequently faced backlash from some Spanish fans for his support of the Catalan independence referendum.

From 2010 to 2022, Piqué was in a relationship with Colombian singer Shakira. They met when he appeared in the music video for her single "Waka Waka (This Time for Africa)", the official song of the 2010 FIFA World Cup. Piqué and Shakira share the same birthday, ten years apart. They have two sons together, named Milan and Sasha. The couple confirmed in a joint statement that they were separating in June 2022. Piqué has been in a relationship with Clara Chía Martí since 2022.

Piqué was the face of Mango's men's line HE for four consecutive campaign seasons between 2011 and 2012. In 2012, he lent his voice to the Catalan version of The Pirates! In an Adventure with Scientists! as the Pirate King.

=== Media and business interests ===
Piqué is the founder and president of Kosmos Holding (Kosmos Global Holding S.L.), a sports and media investment group he founded with Hiroshi Mikitani (founder and chairman of Japanese e-commerce firm Rakuten, Inc.), Edmund Chu, Nullah Sarker, and Mike Evans. Kosmos struck a deal with the International Tennis Federation for a 25-year, $3 billion partnership to transform the Davis Cup and generate substantial revenues for global tennis development. In August 2018, U.S. billionaire Larry Ellison publicly stated his support of Kosmos and his intention to invest in the Kosmos-ITF partnership. In January 2023 however, the International Tennis Federation removed Piqué and Kosmos from the partnership.

Piqué is the owner of Spanish second division football club Andorra, which he bought in December 2018 through his firm Kosmos Holding. On 21 May 2022, the team was promoted to the Segunda División after beating already relegated UCAM Murcia 1–0 at home, thus ascending to the second tier for the first time in their history. On 28 July 2019, Piqué took over a majority stake in another Spanish football club – Gimnàstic Manresa. The acquisition was completed through Kosmos.

On 18 December 2020, Piqué invested in the fantasy football game Sorare. Kosmos bought the Spanish broadcasting rights for the 2021 Copa América in a partnership with streamer Ibai Llanos, and in 2021 he and Ibai founded and became co-owners of the esports team KOI. The esports team later acquired a majority interest in Rogue, which resulted in Piqué's team competing in the League of Legends European Championship. As of 11 November 2022, he is president and owner of the Kings League, a new format football competition, made up of teams whose owners are content creators from Twitch, YouTube, TikTok and Instagram. Originally started in Spain, the Kings League has since expanded to Hispanic Latin America, Brazil, Italy, France, Germany, and the Middle East and North Africa region. Kings League has also held annual "Kings World Cup" tournaments featuring the best clubs in Kings League (Kings World Cup Clubs) and representative national teams (Kings World Cup Nations), as well as a female version known as the Queens League.

=== Philanthropy ===
On 30 March 2020, in response to the COVID-19 pandemic Piqué (along with teammates, including Lionel Messi) committed to a 70% salary cut throughout the crisis. They further committed to donating to the salaries of all employees at the club during the state of emergency.

=== Tax fraud ===
On 10 July 2019, Piqué was ordered by a Spanish court to pay €2.1 million to the tax authorities following his conviction for image rights fraud. He had been convicted by Spain's National Court in 2016 for faking the sale of his image rights to his Kerad Project company to evade taxes from 2008 to 2010.

=== Corruption investigation ===
On 30 May 2024, Pique was placed under official investigation by a court in Spain over his alleged involvement in a deal which saw the Spanish Super Cup moved to Saudi Arabia (then-RFEF president Luis Rubiales had been arrested and his successor Pedro Rocha was also under investigation).

=== Poker tournament results ===
On 27 August 2019, Piqué took part in the EPT Barcelona €25,000 Single-Day High Roller Event. He finished in second place and won a prize of €352,950.

== Career statistics ==
=== Club ===
Appearances and goals by club, season and competition
Club	Season	League			National Cup (Note: Includes FA Cup, Copa del Rey)		League Cup (Note: Includes Football League Cup)		Europe		Other		Total	
Club	Season	Division	Apps	Goals	Apps	Goals	Apps	Goals	Apps	Goals	Apps	Goals	Apps	Goals
Manchester United	2004–05	Premier League	0	0	1	0	1	0	1 (Note: Appearance(s) in UEFA Champions League)	0	0	0	3	0
Manchester United	2005–06	Premier League	3	0	2	0	2	0	0	0	—		7	0
Manchester United	2006–07	Premier League	0	0	0	0	0	0	0	0	—		0	0
Manchester United	2007–08	Premier League	9	0	0	0	1	0	3	2	0	0	13	2
Manchester United	Total		12	0	3	0	4	0	4	2	0	0	23	2
Real Zaragoza (loan)	2006–07	La Liga	22	2	6	1	—		—		—		28	3
Barcelona	2008–09	La Liga	25	1	6	1	—		14	1	0	0	45	3
Barcelona	2009–10	La Liga	32	2	1	0	—		12 (Note: One appearance in UEFA Super Cup, eleven appearances and two goals in UEFA Champions League)	2	4 (Note: Two appearances in Supercopa de España, two in FIFA Club World Cup)	0	49	4
Barcelona	2010–11	La Liga	31	3	7	0	—		12	1	1 (Note: Appearance(s) in Supercopa de España)	0	51	4
Barcelona	2011–12	La Liga	22	2	8	0	—		5	0	3 (Note: Two appearances in Supercopa de España, one in FIFA Club World Cup)	0	38	2
Barcelona	2012–13	La Liga	28	2	4	1	—		10	0	2	0	44	3
Barcelona	2013–14	La Liga	26	2	2	0	—		9	2	2	0	39	4
Barcelona	2014–15	La Liga	27	5	6	1	—		11	1	—		44	7
Barcelona	2015–16	La Liga	30	2	5	2	—		8 (Note: One appearance in UEFA Super Cup, seven appearances and one goal in UEFA Champions League)	1	3 (Note: One appearance in Supercopa de España, two in FIFA Club World Cup)	0	46	5
Barcelona	2016–17	La Liga	25	2	7	0	—		8	1	1	0	41	3
Barcelona	2017–18	La Liga	30	2	8	1	—		9	1	2	0	49	4
Barcelona	2018–19	La Liga	35	4	5	0	—		11	2	1	1	52	7
Barcelona	2019–20	La Liga	35	1	2	0	—		7	0	1	0	45	1
Barcelona	2020–21	La Liga	18	0	2	1	—		3	2	0	0	23	3
Barcelona	2021–22	La Liga	27	1	2	0	—		10 (Note: Five appearances and one goal in UEFA Champions League, five appearances and one goal in UEFA Europa League)	2	1	0	40	3
Barcelona	2022–23	La Liga	6	0	—		—		4	0	—		10	0
Barcelona	Total		397	29	65	7	—		133	15	21	1	616	52
Career total			431	31	74	8	4	0	137	17	21	1	667	57

=== International ===
Appearances and goals by national team and year
National team	Year	Apps	Goals
Spain	2009	13	4
Spain	2010	16	0
Spain	2011	8	0
Spain	2012	11	0
Spain	2013	11	0
Spain	2014	6	0
Spain	2015	8	0
Spain	2016	12	1
Spain	2017	9	0
Spain	2018	8	0
Total		102	5

Spain score listed first, score column indicates score after each Piqué goal

List of international goals scored by Gerard Piqué
No.	Date	Venue	Cap	Opponent	Score	Result	Competition
1	28 March 2009	Santiago Bernabéu Stadium, Madrid, Spain	2	Turkey	1–0	1–0	2010 FIFA World Cup qualification
2	12 August 2009	Philip II Arena, Skopje, Macedonia	8	Macedonia	2–2	3–2	Friendly
3	5 September 2009	Estadio Riazor, A Coruña, Spain	9	Belgium	3–0	5–0	2010 FIFA World Cup qualification
4	14 October 2009	Bilino Polje, Zenica, Bosnia and Herzegovina	12	Bosnia and Herzegovina	1–0	5–2	2010 FIFA World Cup qualification
5	13 June 2016	Stadium Municipal, Toulouse, France	78	Czech Republic	1–0	1–0	UEFA Euro 2016

== Honours ==
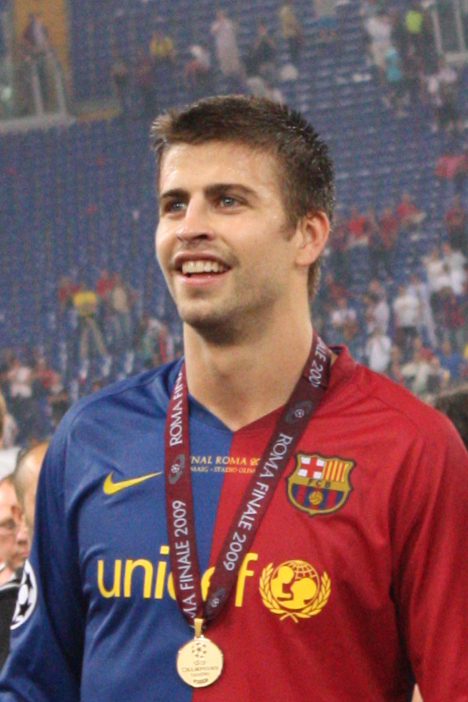
Piqué celebrating victory after receiving his medal for winning the 2009 UEFA Champions League Final

Manchester United

- Premier League: 2007–08
- Football League Cup: 2005–06
- FA Community Shield: 2007
- UEFA Champions League: 2007–08

Barcelona

- La Liga: 2008–09, 2009–10, 2010–11, 2012–13, 2014–15, 2015–16, 2017–18, 2018–19, 2022–23
- Copa del Rey: 2008–09, 2011–12, 2014–15, 2015–16, 2016–17, 2017–18, 2020–21
- Supercopa de España: 2009, 2010, 2011, 2013, 2016, 2018
- UEFA Champions League: 2008–09, 2010–11, 2014–15
- UEFA Super Cup: 2009, 2015
- FIFA Club World Cup: 2009, 2011, 2015

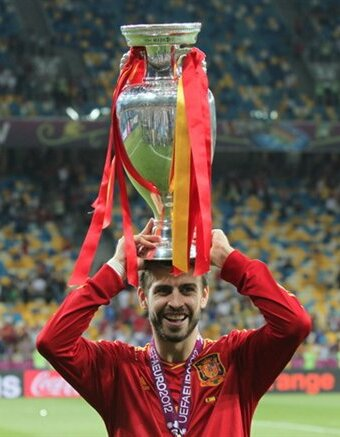
Piqué with the Henri Delaunay Trophy in 2012

Spain

- FIFA World Cup: 2010
- UEFA European Championship: 2012
- UEFA European Under-19 Championship: 2006

Individual

- La Liga Breakthrough Player of the Year: 2008–09
- La Liga Best Defender: 2009–10
- La Liga Team of the Season: 2014–15, 2015–16
- UEFA Champions League Team of the Season: 2014–15
- UEFA La Liga Team of the Season: 2016–17
- UEFA European Championship Team of the Tournament: 2012
- UEFA Team of the Year: 2010, 2011, 2012, 2015, 2016
- FIFA FIFPro World11: 2010, 2011, 2012, 2016
- ESM Team of the Year: 2010–11, 2013–14, 2014–15, 2015–16
- Footballer of the Year in Catalonia: 2019
- Memorial Aldo Rovira Award: 2018–19

Decorations

- Gold Medal of the Royal Order of Sporting Merit: 2011

== See also ==
- List of footballers with 100 or more UEFA Champions League appearances
- List of men's footballers with 100 or more international caps
- List of footballers with 400 or more La Liga appearances
