= César Rodriguez =

César Rodriguez may refer to:

- César Atahualpa Rodríguez (1889–1972), Peruvian poet
- César Rodríguez González (1894–1962), Spanish journalist and politician
- César Rodríguez (footballer, born 1920) (1920–1995), Spanish footballer
- Cesar Rodriguez (pilot) (born 1959), American fighter pilot in the Gulf War, nicknamed the "Last American Ace"
- César Rodríguez (taekwondo) (born 1962), Mexican taekwondo practitioner
- César Rodríguez (footballer, born 1967), Peruvian footballer
- César Rodríguez Garavito (born 1971), Colombian legal scholar
- César Rodríguez Cal y Mayor (born 1969), Mexican politician
- César Rodríguez (weightlifter) (born 1973), Puerto Rican weightlifter
- César Rodríguez (racewalker) (born 1997), Peruvian racewalker

== See also ==
- Caesar Rodriguez, comic book artist
- César Aparecido Rodrigues (born 1974), Brazilian footballer
