= Manuel Sima =

Equatoguinean footballer (born 1988)

Personal information
- Full name: Manuel Sima Ntutumu Bindang
- Date of birth: 31 December 1988 (age 37)
- Place of birth: Libreville, Gabon
- Height: 1.80 m (5 ft 11 in)
- Position: Striker

Senior career*
Years	Team	Apps	(Gls)
–2008	Akonangui		
2009–2010	Deportivo Mongomo		
2010	San Roque de Lepe	0	(0)
2010	San Roque de Lepe B	12	(2)
2011	La Muela	3	(1)
2011–2014	Cuarte Industrial	94	(13)
2015–2017	Utrillas	81	(8)
2017	San Juan de Mozarrifar	14	(1)
2018	Villanueva	15	(3)
2018–2021	Épila	69	(7)
2021	Borja	0	(0)

International career
2008	Equatorial Guinea B	4	(1)
2009	Equatorial Guinea	1	(0)
- * Club domestic league appearances and goals as of 18 January 2015

Manuel Sima Ntutumu Bindang (born 31 December 1988) is a former footballer who played as a striker.

Born in Gabon, he has played in the Equatoguinean league and subsequently capped for the Equatorial Guinea national team.

== Career ==
Sima played in Equatorial Guinea for Akonangui and Deportivo Mongomo. In 2010, he moved to Spain and had a trial with Segunda División B club San Roque. He participated of a friendly match against the Segunda División side Recreativo de Huelva, won by 2–1.

=== International career ===
In June 2008, Sima represented Equatorial Guinea in the CEMAC Cup and scored a goal against Chad.

He was called by the Spanish Vicente Engonga -then coach of the Equatorial Guinea senior team- for the squad that played against South Africa on 11 October 2008, however he did not appear in the match. Sima eventually played in a friendly match against Mali on 25 March 2009.

==== International goals ====
#	Date	Venue	Opponent	Score	Result	Competition
1	17 June 2008	Stade Ahmadou Ahidjo, Yaoundé, Cameroon	Chad	2 – 1	2 - 2	2008 CEMAC Cup
