= César Martínez =

Cesar Martinez may refer to:

- César Martínez (artist) (born 1944), Chicano artist
- César Martínez (footballer, born 1986), Paraguayan football midfielder
- César Martínez (footballer, born 1995), Mexican football midfielder
- César Martínez, a character in Mujeres engañadas

== See also ==
- Caesar Martinez, a character in The Walking Dead
