= Miguel Martínez (Spanish footballer) =

Spanish footballer

Miguel
Personal information
- Full name: Miguel Martínez de Corta
- Date of birth: 25 November 1981 (age 44)
- Place of birth: Logroño, Spain
- Height: 1.90 m (6 ft 3 in)
- Position: Goalkeeper

Youth career
- Loyola Logroño
- Barcelona

Senior career*
Years	Team	Apps	(Gls)
1998–1999	Barcelona C	3	(0)
2000–2001	Calahorra	14	(0)
2001–2005	Zaragoza B	60	(0)
2003–2008	Zaragoza	4	(0)
2003–2004	→ Zamora (loan)	36	(0)
2005–2006	→ Lleida (loan)	4	(0)
2008–2010	Huesca	20	(0)
2010–2012	Albacete	40	(0)
2012–2013	Alavés	11	(0)
2013–2019	Logroñés	199	(0)
2020–2021	Ejea	23	(0)
2021–2024	Calahorra	32	(0)
Total		446	(0)
- * Club domestic league appearances and goals

Miguel Martínez de Corta (born 25 November 1981), known simply as Miguel, is a Spanish former professional footballer who played as a goalkeeper.

== Club career ==
Miguel was born in Logroño, La Rioja. An unsuccessful youth graduate at FC Barcelona, he moved to Real Zaragoza in 2001 but did not make an impact with the first team, only playing four games – all during 2002–03's Segunda División – and conceding five goals as they returned to La Liga after a one-year absence.

After loan spells with Zamora CF and UE Lleida, Miguel was released by Zaragoza and joined SD Huesca, newly promoted to the second division. At the Aragonese neighbours, he also struggled to start.

In mid-July 2010, Miguel signed with division two club Albacete Balompié, as another player in the position, Jesús Cabrero, moved in the opposite direction. In his first season, he was back-up to Keylor Navas as the Manchegans were relegated.

In June 2012, after Albacete failed to gain promotion via the play-offs, Miguel signed for fellow Segunda División B side Deportivo Alavés who were eventually crowned champions, though he missed much of the season with a knee injury. He chose to remain in that tier with his hometown club UD Logroñés.

Miguel remained in the third division subsequently, with SD Ejea and CD Calahorra, returning to the latter 20 years after leaving.

== Career statistics ==
Appearances and goals by club, season and competition
Club	Season	League			Cup		Europe		Other		Total	
Club	Season	Division	Apps	Goals	Apps	Goals	Apps	Goals	Apps	Goals	Apps	Goals
Calahorra	2000–01	Segunda División B	14	0	—		—		—		14	0
Zaragoza B	2001–02	Segunda División B	5	0	—		—		—		5	0
Zaragoza B	2002–03	Segunda División B	23	0	—		—		—		23	0
Zaragoza B	2004–05	Segunda División B	32	0	—		—		2 (Note: Appearances in Segunda División B play-offs)	0	34	0
Zaragoza B	Total		60	0	—		—		2	0	62	0
Zaragoza	2002–03	Segunda División	4	0	1	0	—		—		5	0
Zaragoza	2004–05	La Liga	0	0	0	0	—		—		0	0
Zaragoza	2005–06	La Liga	0	0	—		—		—		0	0
Zaragoza	2006–07	La Liga	0	0	2	0	—		—		2	0
Zaragoza	2007–08	La Liga	0	0	0	0	0	0	—		0	0
Zaragoza	Total		4	0	3	0	0	0	—		7	0
Zamora (loan)	2003–04	Segunda División B	36	0	2	0	—		—		38	0
Lleida (loan)	2005–06	Segunda División	4	0	0	0	—		—		4	0
Huesca	2008–09	Segunda División	6	0	1	0	—		—		7	0
Huesca	2009–10	Segunda División	14	0	0	0	—		—		14	0
Huesca	Total		20	0	1	0	—		—		21	0
Albacete	2010–11	Segunda División	6	0	1	0	—		—		7	0
Albacete	2011–12	Segunda División B	34	0	2	0	—		4	0	40	0
Albacete	Total		40	0	3	0	—		4	0	47	0
Alavés	2012–13	Segunda División B	11	0	2	0	—		—		13	0
Logroñés	2013–14	Segunda División B	23	0	—		—		—		23	0
Logroñés	2014–15	Segunda División B	37	0	—		—		2	0	39	0
Logroñés	2015–16	Segunda División B	35	0	2	0	—		4	0	41	0
Logroñés	2016–17	Segunda División B	34	0	0	0	—		—		34	0
Logroñés	2017–18	Segunda División B	34	0	0	0	—		—		34	0
Logroñés	2018–19	Segunda División B	36	0	0	0	—		—		36	0
Logroñés	Total		199	0	2	0	—		6	0	207	0
Ejea	2020–21	Segunda División B	23	0	—		—		—		23	0
Calahorra	2021–22	Primera División RFEF	6	0	1	0	—		—		7	0
Calahorra	2022–23	Primera Federación	17	0	—		—		—		17	0
Calahorra	2023–24	Segunda Federación	9	0	—		—		—		9	0
Calahorra	Total		32	0	1	0	—		—		33	0
Career total			443	0	14	0	0	0	12	0	469	0
