= César González (poet) =

Argentine poet and cinematographer

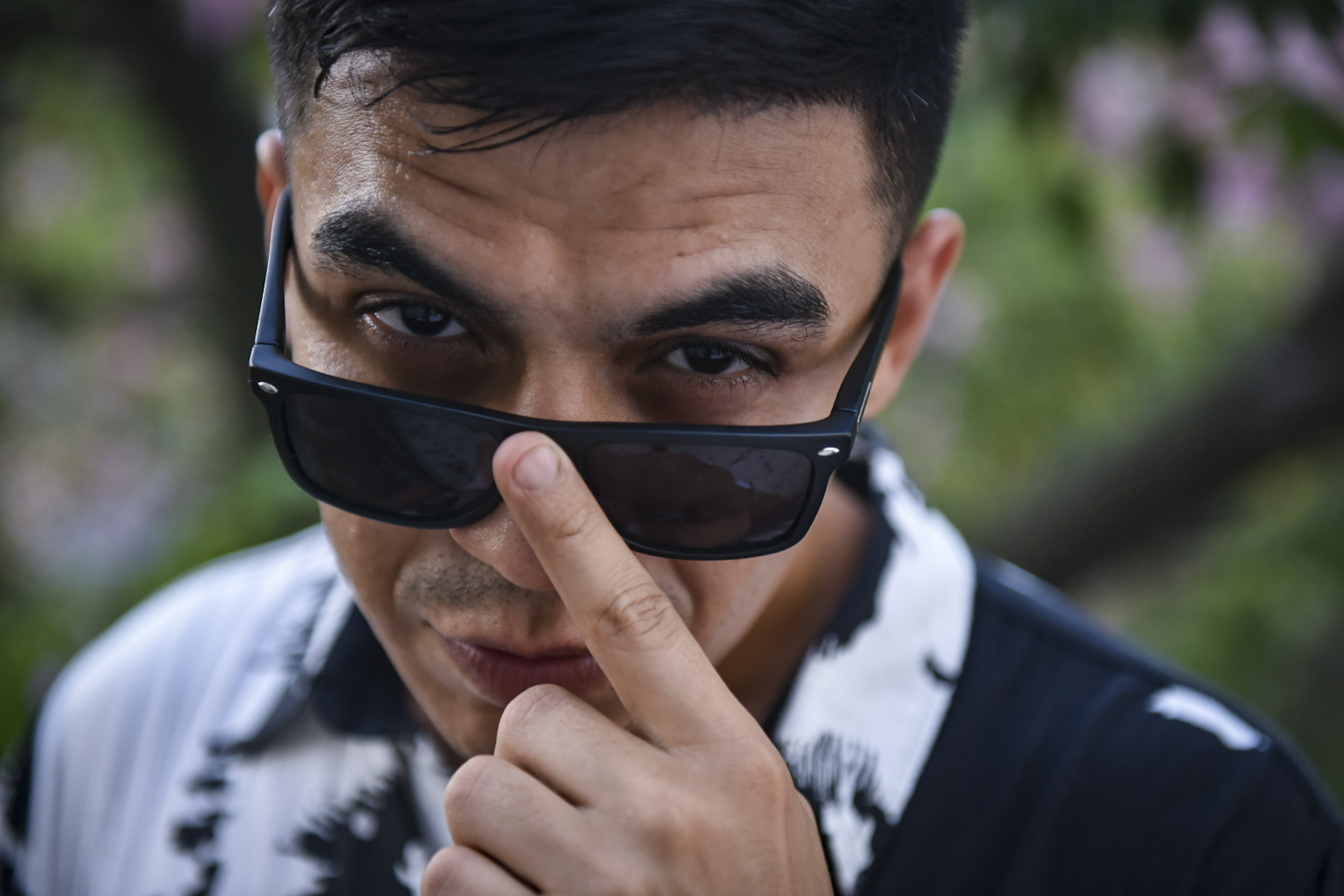
González in 2023

César González (born 28 February 1989 Morón, Buenos Aires, Argentina), (also known as Camilo Blajaquis) is an Argentine poet and cinematographer. He is often referred to as "el poeta villero" (the poet from the ghetto).

González published his first book, La Venganza del Cordero Atado, in 2010, soon after completing imprisonment in a youth detention center for the fourth time. The book included illustrations from Ricardo Cohen, Argentine plastic artist who became interested in his work

Referring to his legal problems, González has labelled to himself as "the exception that confirms the rule".

A student of Gilles Deleuze, Pierre Bourdieu and Michel Foucault, González's work often covers the issues of social stigmatization towards the villas or ghettos both in Argentina and the rest of the world and the violence of the jail system.

González also writes for magazines and music video productions for rappers like "El As" (from Fuerte Apache) Fili Wey (from Puerta de Hierro) and Alan Garvey (as González, from Villa Gardel).
