= César Santos =

Brazilian footballer (born 1969)

Personal information
- Full name: César Luís dos Santos Camargo
- Date of birth: 21 March 1969 (age 57)
- Height: 1.77 m (5 ft 9 1/2 in)
- Position: Forward

Senior career*
Years	Team	Apps	(Gls)
1993–1994	Standard Liège	1	(0)
1994–1995	RFC Liège	2	(0)
1995–1996	Louletano	28	(9)
1996–1999	Beira-Mar	76	(7)
1999–2000	Imortal	12	(2)
2000–2001	Paredes	1	(0)
2001	Marco	0	(0)
2001–2002	Louletano	5	(0)
2002–2003	São João de Ver	6	(0)
- * Club domestic league appearances and goals

César Luís dos Santos Camargo, known as César Santos (born 21 March 1969) is a former Brazilian football player. He also holds Portuguese citizenship.

== Club career ==
He made his Primeira Liga debut for Beira-Mar on 21 August 1998 in a game against Braga.

== Honours ==
Beira-Mar

- Taça de Portugal: 1998–99
