= César Martínez (footballer, born 1995) =

Mexican footballer

Personal information
- Full name: César Martínez Gutiérrez
- Date of birth: 12 May 1995 (age 31)
- Place of birth: Monterrey, Nuevo León, Mexico
- Height: 1.79 m (5 ft 10 1/2 in)
- Position: Midfielder

Team information
- Current team: Guadalupe F.C.

Youth career
- 2010–2017: Monterrey

Senior career*
Years	Team	Apps	(Gls)
2015–	Monterrey	0	(0)
2017–	→Guadalupe F.C.(loan)	25	(2)
- * Club domestic league appearances and goals as of August 13, 2018

César Martínez Gutiérrez (born May 12, 1995) is a Mexican footballer who plays as a midfielder for Guadalupe F.C. of the Liga FPD on loan from Monterrey.
