= César González Martínez =

Venezuelan lawyer and politician (1904–1984)

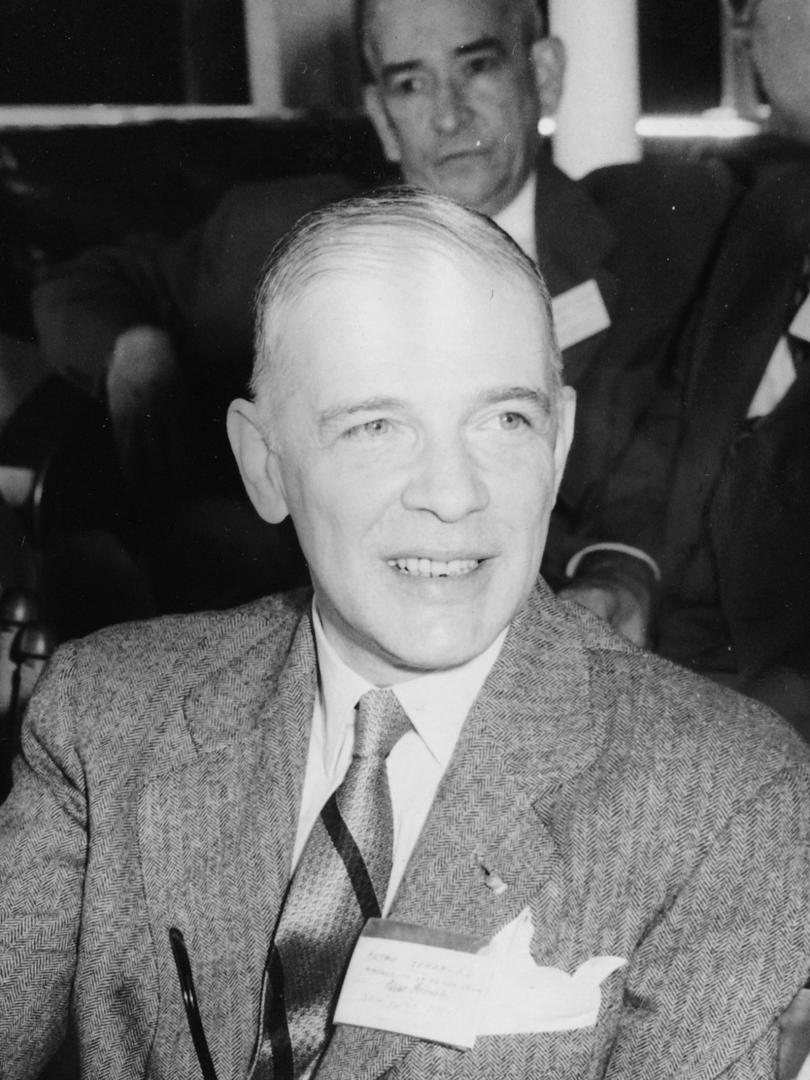

Minister of Interior and Justice
- In office 28 May 1942 – 5 May 1943
- Preceded by: Tulio Chiossone
- Succeeded by: Juan Penzini Hernández

Personal details
- Born: 14 December 1904 San Cristóbal (Táchira),
- Died: 9 July 1984 (aged 79) Caracas
- Spouse: Georgina Cortés Guzmán

Dr. César González Martinez (14 December 1904 in San Cristóbal, Táchira – 9 July 1984 in Caracas) was a Venezuelan lawyer. He also served as Minister of the Interior and Justice.

González was also an Ambassador of Venezuela to several countries. At an early age he served as deputy to the national congress, Vice President to the Chamber of Representatives of Congress (1929–1932), Senator for the State of El Tachira and Minister of the Interior and Justice (1942–1943), forming part of President Isaías Medina Angarita's Cabinet. His diplomatic career included being Ambassador of Venezuela in Mexico (1943–1945), Permanent Representative of Venezuela at the United Nations (1946–1952) and Ambassador of Venezuela in the United States (1952–1958).

== Early life ==
González's father, Dr. Rubén González Cárdenas, was a lawyer, politician, and prominent Minister of Public Education and Minister of the Interior during the regime of General Juan Vicente Gómez. His mother, Dolores Martínez de González, was the first-born of a Tachira family of four (César, Blanca, Tulia and Ana Clotilde). His elementary studies were in Capacho, under the teachings of Carlos Julio Reyes. During his childhood, general political turmoil in San Cristóbal led to the family's relocation to Caracas in 1917.

In his autobiography, González wrote his father described his home as "a holy place [...] where no political intrigue or matters of public life dared to enter." He described his father as a man that "knew how to put aside his daily chores and, inflexibly, forbade the family [from] being involved or to be the instrument of political events". He mentioned that he would often "slide carefully [...] between the main door and the hallway, an envelope with a sum that would remedy cruel necessity for the family of friends that could not make ends meet".

González refers to the moral fiber of his father as "almost organic" and assures that "in applying the Law he was implacable, his North: correction, and the energy to enforce it." The combination of a smart man, inflexible but "wanted to share with others his possessions", comes out in the proceedings of César González who is precise in his prose, meticulous in his investigations, exact in his chronicle, and lyrical in his speech.

== Education ==
He attended elementary school at the Escuela Normal de Hombres de Caracas, under the teachings of Teodosio V. Sánchez and high school at Colegio Francés, Colegio Salesiano and Liceo Caracas, under the teachings of Rómulo Gallegos, today Liceo Andrés Bello. He graduated from Law school and obtained his Doctorate in Political Science (1929) at the Universidad Central de Venezuela. He was involved in the complex political movements of transitional times.

César González had the fortune to assist as secretary to his father, Dr. Rubén González. He "was acquainted with his ideas, knew of his doubts, and was his companion at the moment of his political misfortune, he was present in conversations between founders of political movements that visited Minister González, and was a silent witness of General Juan Vicente Gomez's actions as Chief of State keeping an orderly archive as Minister to account even after the death of any way of proceedings or doubts."

At 26 years old, he worked as a Congressman for the State of Bolivar, with a seat at National Congress between 1929 and 1932. He was Vice President of the Chamber of Representatives in 1931; Secretary of the Venezuela Delegation to the Assembly of the United Nations in 1932; Senator for the State of Táchira and Vice President of the Senate in 1942; Legal Consulter and Advisor to the State Treasury Department, 1941–1942; President of the Legal Bar Association, 1942; Member of the Fiscal Legislation Commission; Member of the Third Delegation of Ministers of The Americas in Río de Janeiro, 1942; Minister of the Interior, 1942–1943.

== Personal life ==
Serving as Ambassador of Venezuela in Mexico, he married Georgina Cortés Guzmán (Puebla, Pue. 24 April 1924 – Cuernavaca, Mor. 9 April 2001) on 21 September 1944. From this marriage came two children: María Dolores González Cortés, married to Mauro Henríquez Iturbe; and Rubén Daniel González Cortés, married to María Inés Hurtado de González.

He was fluent in Spanish, English, French, and Italian.

== Political life ==
=== Cabinet of General Isaías Medina Angarita in 1942. ===
Cabinet of General Isaías Medina Angarita in 1942.-
Ministry	Name
Interior Relations Minister	Doctor César González
Secretary to the President	Doctor Arturo Uslar Pietri
Minister of the Treasury	Doctor Alfredo Machado
Development Minister	Mr. Eugenio Mendoza
Education Minister	Doctor Gustavo Herrera
Exterior relations Minister	Doctor Caracciolo Parra Pérez
War and Navy Minister	Colonel Juan de Dios Celis Paredes
Labor Minister	Doctor Héctor Cuenca
Agriculture Minister	Mr. Rodolfo Rojas
Sanitation and Social Assistance Minister	Dr. Félix Lairet
Public Works Minister	Eng. Manuel Silveira
Capital District Governor	Lt.Col. Francisco Leonardi

=== National Identity Program under the Government of General Isaías Medina Angarita ===
In 1943, González initiated the first National Identity program. He received the second National Identity Card, after the president.

=== Foreign Service ===
González served as Ambassador of Venezuela in Mexico, 1943–1945; Ambassador in Ecuador, 1945; Venezuela Delegate at the Interamerican Conference for Matters of War and Peace, 1945; Chief of the Political Section at United Nations 1946–1950; Ambassador of Venezuela at the United Nations 1950–1952; Ambassador of Venezuela to the United States 1952–1958; Venezuela Delegate for the X Interamerican Conference in Caracas 1954; Representative for the Venezuelan President at the Interamerican Nations Conference and President of the Conference, 1956.

=== Statues of Simon Bolivar ===
González promoted the commissioning of statues, busts, and plaques of Simon Bolivar in the countries where he served as a diplomat. Such was the case of the equestrian statue in Mexico City (1944). González expressed appreciation for the president of Venezuela, who approved his suggestion to provide all the cities and towns that had the name of Bolívar with a bronze bust, plaque, or statue in Simon Bolivar's honor. In the United States, fourteen settlements are named Bolívar. The project included commissioning sculptor Felix de Weldon of the Iwo Jima Memorial to create the Equestrian of Simón Bolívar in Washington D.C.

== Activities as consulter, advisor, and historian ==
During his seven-year stay in Mexico (1958–1965), he served as legal advisor to the Mexican Housing Institute and Official Chronicler of Distrito Capacho, Estado Táchira.

== Activities in genealogy and heraldry ==
González authored The Old Families of Tachira (Spanish: Vieja Gente del Táchira) which contributed to the knowledge of family roots of the State of Tachira, arguing that these were influential in the political birth of Venezuela's economy and path towards a modern republican statehood. His work is highlighted by extensive research of the 15th century when the first families arrived in the Andes region from Spain.

== Honorary memberships ==
- Centro de Historia del Departamento Vargas, Distrito Federal
- Colegio de Abogados del Distrito Federal
- Grupo Nacional de Venezuela de la Corte permanente de Arbitraje
- Instituto de Ciencias Sociales de México
- Academia de Historia del Departamento Norte de Santander, Colombia
- Sociedad Bolivariana de Venezuela.
- Miembro de Número del Instituto Venezolano de Genealogía.
- Individuo de Número del Centro de Historia del Estado Táchira.
- Miembro honorario de la Orden de Abogados de Brasil.

== Government decorations and awards ==
- Venezuela: Orden del Libertador, Gran Cordón; Orden de Andrés Bello, Banda de Honor; Orden Francisco de Miranda, Primera Clase.
- Colombia: Cruz de Boyacá, Primera Clase
- Mexico: Cruz del Águila Azteca, Primera Clase
- Nicaragua: Orden de Rubén Darío, Primera Clase
- France: Legión de Honor, Comendador
- Ecuador: Orden del Mérito, Gran Oficial.

== Publications ==
- Historia del Estado Táchira (1981) Ediciones de la Presidencia de la República. Caracas, Venezuela.
- Vieja Gente del Táchira (1975). César González. Comandancia General de las Fuerzas Armadas de Cooperación. Caracas, Venezuela.
- Vieja Gente del Táchira - Crónicas Genealógicas (1975). Imprenta de la Guardia Nacional. Caracas, Venezuela.
- Vieja Gente del Táchira (1997) Colección Biblioteca de Autores y Temas Tachirenses, Volumen N° 134. Imprenta Nacional. Venezuela.
- Concepto Latinoamericano de Nacionalidad (1929). Universidad Central de Venezuela.
- Rubén González - Una Vida al Servicio de Venezuela (1972). Colección Biblioteca de Autores y Temas Tachirenses, Volumen N° 57.
- Rubén González - Una Vida al Servicio de Venezuela (1975). Publicaciones del Ministerio de Educación. Caracas, Venezuela.
- Tierras del Antiguo Capacho (1978). Ediciones Casa de la Cultura Manuel Antonio Díaz Cárdenas N° 7. Capacho, Estado Táchira, Venezuela.
- Dos Discursos (1980). Ediciones Casa de la Cultura Manuel Antonio Díaz Cárdenas, Capacho, Estado Táchira, Venezuela.
- El 5 de Julio de 1980 en Libertad (1981). Ediciones Casa de la Cultura Manuel Antonio Díaz Cárdenas. Capacho, Estado Táchira, Venezuela.

== Interviews ==
- In "Isaías Medina Angarita, democracia y negación. Historia Contemporánea de Venezuela." Eduardo Guzmán Pérez (1985). Editorial Espasande. Caracas, Venezuela.

== Reviews and publications ==
- Written profile: Dr. César González (1985). In: Isaías Medina Angarita - Democracia y Negación. J. Historia Contemporánea de Venezuela. By J. Eduardo Guzmán Pérez. Lithobinder C.A., pág. 281. Caracas, Venezuela.
- Written profile in: Las Estatuas de Simón Bolívar en el Mundo (1983). Centro Simon Bolívar. Caracas, Venezuela.
- Photographic profile of Dr. César González. En: Caracas LQQD (1977). Guillermo José Schael. Gráficas Armitano, pág. 157. Caracas, Venezuela.
- Written profile in: Venezuela y Estados Unidos a través de dos siglos (2000). Cámara Venezolana-Americana de Comercio e Industria. Tomás Polanco Alcántara, Simón Alberto Consalvi, Edgardo Mondolfi. Caracas, Venezuela.
- Written profile in: Historia del Estado Táchira (1981). Tulio Chiossone. Ediciones de la Presidencia de la República; pág. 134. Caracas, Venezuela.

== Literary activity, speeches and presentations ==
González is the author of many speeches of historical and literary nature. Of mention is as principal speaker at the Municipal Council of the District of Capacho, on 20 May 1973, on the 98th anniversary of the founding of the population of Independence. The speech is divided into two portions; the first part develops the figure of a child (clearly himself) with a great amount of first-hand knowledge. In the second part, he describes the historical pillars of the town and its dwellers. In another dissertation, given in the town of Liberty on 5 July 1980, he demonstrates a rigorous investigative and patriotic sense.

In an interview contained in the text Democracy and Negation by Eduardo Guzman P. (Democracia y Negación) shortly before his untimely death, he outlines the political panorama during the presidential period of Isaias Medina Angarita and his forerunners as actors and players (first as Legal Advisor and later as Minister of Internal Affairs). During the interview, he provides an outlook on personalities: ¨I believe that the most astute politician that Venezuela has had was called Juan Vicente Gomez, even though this may seem sacrilegious", "If we must recognize a trait of President Isaias Medina Angarita it was his North and vision on Venezuela, he was a man of discipline and restrain ", General Medina surrounded himself with capable young men, such as myself and Dr. Arturo Uslar Pietri, who had all the right to be the next president of this country due to his career, executions and by being the man with most sympathy within the regime".
