= César Valdez (disambiguation) =

César Valdez may refer to:

- César Valdés (born 1942), Cuban basketball player
- César Valdez (boxer) (born 1964), Mexican boxer
- César Valdez (born 1985), Dominican baseball player
