= César Rodríguez Cal y Mayor =

Mexican politician

- Born: 11 August 1969 (age 56); Chiapas, Mexico
- Occupation: Politician
- Political party: PAN

César Augusto Rodríguez Cal y Mayor (born 11 August 1969) is a Mexican politician from the National Action Party. In 2012 he served as Deputy of the LXI Legislature of the Mexican Congress representing Chiapas.
