= CD Boiro =

Spanish football team

Coordinates: 42.639193°N 8.878901°W

Boiro
- Full name: Club Deportivo Boiro
- Founded: 1966; 60 years ago
- Stadium: Campo de Barraña
- Capacity: 1,400
- President: Marcos Martínez
- Head coach: José Tizón
- League: Tercera Federación – Group 1
- 2025–26: Tercera Federación – Group 1, 8th of 18
Home colours	Away colours

Club Deportivo Boiro is a Spanish football team based in Boiro, in the autonomous community of Galicia. Founded in 1966 it currently plays in Tercera Federación – Group 1, holding home games at Campo de Barraña, which holds 1,500 spectators.

== Season to season ==
Season	Tier	Division	Place	Copa del Rey
1967–68	5	1ª Reg.	4th	
1968–69	5	1ª Reg.	2nd	
1969–70	5	1ª Reg.	1st	
1970–71	5	1ª Reg.	5th	
1971–72	5	1ª Reg.	4th	
1972–73	5	1ª Reg.	1st	
1973–74	5	1ª Reg.	2nd	
1974–75	5	2ª Reg.	6th	
1975–76	5	2ª Reg.	3rd	
1976–77	5	2ª Reg.	1st	
1977–78	5	Serie A	3rd	
1978–79	5	Reg. Pref.	3rd	
1979–80	5	Reg. Pref.	4th	
1980–81	4	3ª	20th	
1981–82	5	Reg. Pref.	7th	
1982–83	5	Reg. Pref.	4th	
1983–84	5	Reg. Pref.	1st	
1984–85	4	3ª	9th	
1985–86	4	3ª	11th	
1986–87	4	3ª	18th	

Season	Tier	Division	Place	Copa del Rey
1987–88	4	3ª	10th	
1988–89	4	3ª	10th	
1989–90	4	3ª	15th	
1990–91	4	3ª	20th	
1991–92	5	Reg. Pref.	5th	
1992–93	5	Reg. Pref.	20th	
1993–94	6	1ª Reg.	7th	
1994–95	6	1ª Reg.	7th	
1995–96	6	1ª Reg.	11th	
1996–97	6	1ª Reg.	3rd	
1997–98	6	1ª Reg.	2nd	
1998–99	5	Reg. Pref.	3rd	
1999–2000	5	Reg. Pref.	12th	
2000–01	5	Reg. Pref.	9th	
2001–02	5	Reg. Pref.	10th	
2002–03	5	Reg. Pref.	2nd	
2003–04	5	Reg. Pref.	7th	
2004–05	5	Reg. Pref.	13th	
2005–06	5	Reg. Pref.	7th	
2006–07	5	Pref. Aut.	5th	

Season	Tier	Division	Place	Copa del Rey
2007–08	5	Pref. Aut.	8th	
2008–09	5	Pref. Aut.	10th	
2009–10	5	Pref. Aut.	7th	
2010–11	5	Pref. Aut.	3rd	
2011–12	5	Pref. Aut.	3rd	
2012–13	5	Pref. Aut.	1st	
2013–14	4	3ª	3rd	
2014–15	4	3ª	15th	
2015–16	4	3ª	1st	
2016–17	3	2ª B	14th	First round
2017–18	4	3ª	10th	
2018–19	4	3ª	19th	
2019–20	5	Pref.	3rd	
2020–21	5	Pref.	2nd	
2021–22	6	Pref.	7th	
2022–23	6	Pref.	3rd	
2023–24	6	Pref.	2nd	First round
2024–25	5	3ª Fed.	9th	
2025–26	5	3ª Fed.	8th	
2026–27	5	3ª Fed.		

- 1 season in Segunda División B
- 11 seasons in Tercera División
- 3 seasons in Tercera Federación

== Current squad ==
As of 7 March 2017

Note: Flags indicate national team as defined under FIFA eligibility rules; some limited exceptions apply. Players may hold more than one non-FIFA nationality.

No.	Pos.	Nation	Player
—	GK	URU	Pato Guillén
—	GK	ESP	Rodri Iglesias
—	DF	ESP	Mateo Garcías
—	DF	ESP	David Soto
—	DF	ESP	Pablo Crespo
—	DF	ESP	Yago
—	DF	ESP	Borja Outeiral
—	DF	ESP	Axel
—	DF	ESP	Catú
—	DF	ESP	Jimmy Seoane
—	MF	ESP	Marcos Álvarez

No.	Pos.	Nation	Player
—	MF	ESP	Romay
—	MF	ESP	Pablo Pillado
—	MF	ESP	Borja Yebra
—	MF	ESP	Manu Rodríguez
—	MF	ESP	Gonzalo González
—	FW	ARG	Juampa Barros
—	FW	ESP	Rubén Rivera
—	FW	BRA	Pedro Beda
—	FW	ESP	Jorge Cano
—	FW	ESP	Herbert

== Honours ==
- Tercera División: 2015–16
