= Jorge Zaparaín =

Spanish footballer

Personal information
- Full name: Jorge Zaparaín Sanz
- Date of birth: 26 April 1984 (age 42)
- Place of birth: Zaragoza, Spain
- Height: 1.82 m (5 ft 11 1/2 in)
- Position: Goalkeeper

Youth career
- Zaragoza

Senior career*
Years	Team	Apps	(Gls)
2002–2009	Zaragoza B	53	(0)
2004	Zaragoza	1	(0)
2007–2008	→ Fuerteventura (loan)	15	(0)
2009–2010	Alfaro	25	(0)
2010–2011	La Muela	31	(0)
2011–2014	Tudelano	76	(0)
2014–2015	Sariñena	14	(0)
2015–2016	Huesca	1	(0)
Total		216	(0)

International career
2001	Spain U16	3	(0)
2001	Spain U17	1	(0)
2003	Spain U19	1	(0)
Medal record
Men's Football
Representing Spain
UEFA European Under-16 Championship
Winner	2001 England
- * Club domestic league appearances and goals

Jorge Zaparaín Sanz (born 26 April 1984 in Zaragoza, Aragon) is a Spanish former footballer who played as a goalkeeper.

== Honours ==
Spain U16

- UEFA European Under-16 Championship: 2001
