= César Salazar =

César Salazar may refer to:

- César Salazar (cyclist) (born 1972), road racing cyclist from Colombia, who also holds Venezuelan nationality
- César Salazar (squash player) (born 1988), Mexican squash player
- César Salazar (baseball) (born 1996), Mexican professional baseball player
- Dr. Cesar Salazar, fictional supporting character in Generator Rex's second and third seasons, in which he is the long-lost elder brother of the title character
