= Cesar Romero (disambiguation) =

Cesar Romero (1907–1994) was an American actor and activist.

Cesar Romero may also refer to:

- César Romero (footballer, born 1980), Brazilian football midfielder
- César Romero (soccer, born 1989), American soccer forward
- César Romero (footballer, born 1999), Honduran football forward
