= César Ramos =

César Ramos may refer to:

- Cesar Ramos (actor)
- Cesar Ramos (baseball) (born 1984)
- César Ramos (boxer) (born 1971)
- César Ramos Esteban (born 1975), Spanish politician, member of the 15th Congress of Deputies
- César Ramos (racing driver) (born 1989), Brazilian racing driver
- César Arturo Ramos (born 1983), Mexican football referee
