= Cesar Ramirez =

César Ramírez is the name of:

- César Augusto Ramírez (born 1975), Paraguayan footballer
- César Ramírez (tennis) "el Tiburón" (born 1990), Mexican tennis player
- César Ramírez (actor) (1929–2003), Filipino actor
- César Ramírez (athlete), Mexican athlete
- César Ramírez (chef), Mexican Michelin-starred chef
