= César Hernández =

César Hernández may refer to:

- César Hernández (infielder) (born 1990), Venezuelan baseball second basemen
- César Hernández (outfielder) (born 1966), Dominican Republic baseball outfielder
- César Hernández Alfonzo (born 1977), Puerto Rican politician
