= Pedro María Morantes =

Venezuelan lawyer, activist, and novelist

Pedro María Morantes (1865–1918) was a Venezuelan lawyer, activist and novelist who went by the pseudonym Pío Gil. He was born in 1862 or 1865 in the La Sabana parish (now La Concordia) of San Cristóbal, Táchira State. In 1884, he started studying law at the University of the Andes in Mérida. He moved to Caracas in 1887, completing his studies there and earning a law degree in 1890. Afterwards he returned to San Cristóbal, where he worked in law, teaching, and business. He also wrote poems and articles for newspapers, such as El Tribuno de Mérida, El Eco de Occidente, and La Idea Restauradora. In 1903 he moved to Caracas again, where he was briefly employed by the Ministry of Foreign Affairs and was a judge for the Federal District. He moved to Europe in 1908, where he was appointed consul in Amsterdam, Netherlands the same year. Living abroad allowed him to publish his critical writings as Pío Gil, but the discovery of his authorship of pseudonymous political pamphlets led to his quick dismissal from the position. His novel El Cabito, published between 1909 and 1917, criticizes Cipriano Castro, the 30th President of Venezuela (1899–1908), whom the work focuses on. Morantes also criticized Castro's successor, Juan Vicente Gómez. His other works include the novels Los Felicitadores, Cuatro Años de mi Cartera, and Puñado de Guijarros, as well as the 1917 poem Lira anárquica. He died in Paris on 4 February 1918. Many of his writings were only published long after his death.
