= César González (bobsleigh) =

Dutch bobsledder

César González (born 2 October 1982 in Santo Domingo) is a Dutch bobsledder born in the Dominican Republic. Gonzáles started with international bobsleigh competitions in the 2002-03 season. In January 2006 he qualified himself in the team of Arend Glas that several weeks earlier qualified for the 2006 Winter Olympics in Turin. At the qualification play-off (named bob-off) held in Oberhof, Germany, he ended up in fourth position behind his opponents, resulting in qualification, but as a reserve bobsledder in case any of the other members faced an injury. Eventually he did not come in action during the Olympics, but he saw his team mates ending up at the 16th position.
