= Manuel Romay =

Spanish footballer

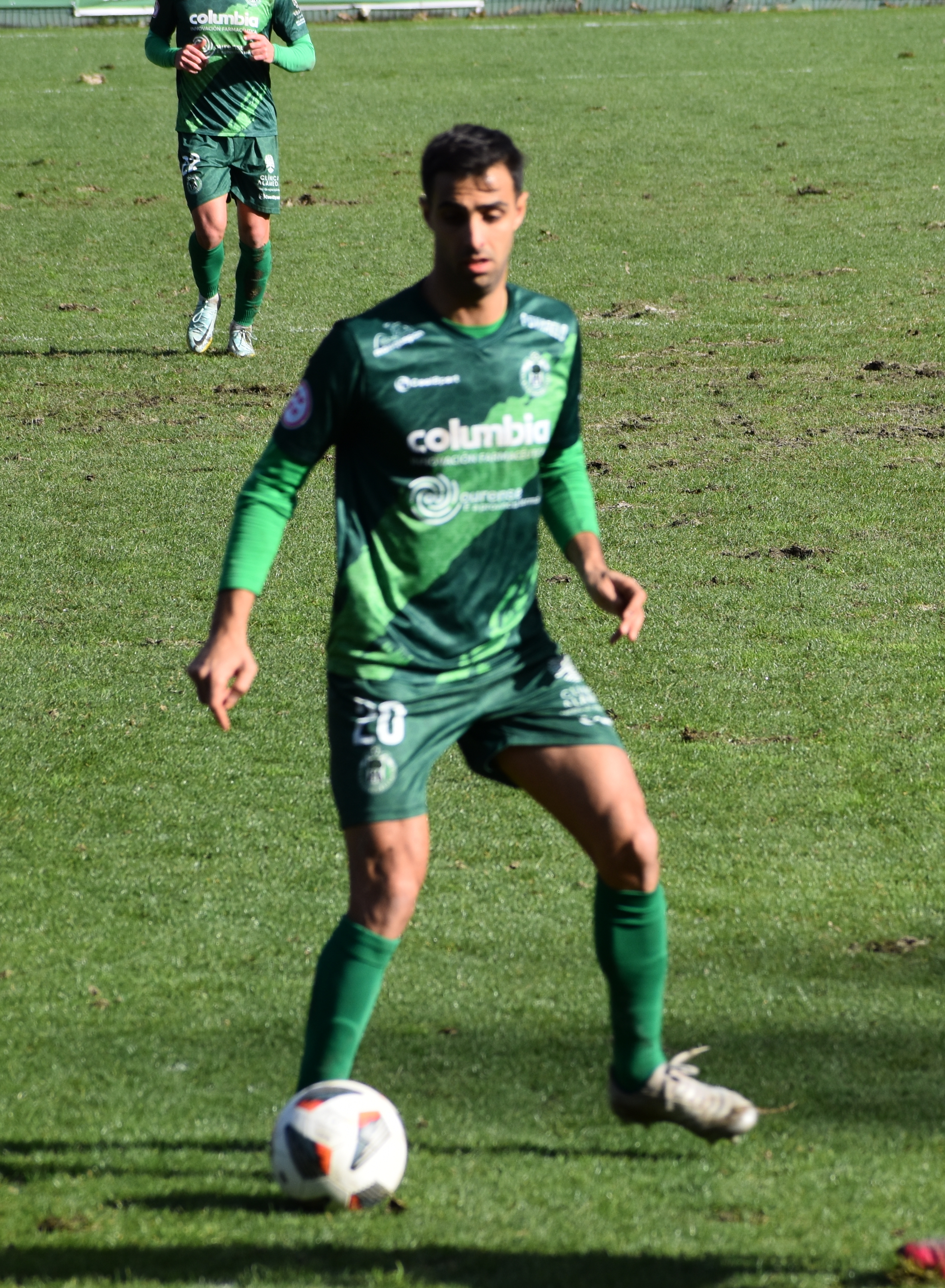

Personal information
- Full name: Jorge Manuel Romay Santiago
- Date of birth: 29 July 1990 (age 36)
- Place of birth: Malpica, Spain
- Height: 1.85 m (6 ft 1 in)
- Position: Midfielder

Team information
- Current team: Villalonga

Senior career*
Years	Team	Apps	(Gls)
2009–2012	Montañeros	84	(5)
2012–2014	Deportivo B	67	(10)
2014–2015	Austria Lustenau	14	(1)
2015–2017	Boiro	37	(6)
2017–2018	Deportivo B	33	(6)
2018–2022	Pontevedra	96	(11)
2022–2024	Arenteiro	53	(1)
2024–2025	Arosa	26	(3)
2025–	Villalonga	2	(0)
- * Club domestic league appearances and goals as of 14 September 2025

Jorge Manuel Romay Santiago (born 29 July 1990) is a Spanish professional footballer playing for Preferente Futgal club Villalonga as a midfielder.

== Club career ==
He commenced his career with Montañeros making 84 appearances between 2009 and 2012. In 2012, he was roped by Deportivo B. Romay said that he was "excited" to play in the team. He made his debut for the club against Celta B.

In June 2014, he signed for Austrian club SC Austria Lustenau. He made his debut against FC Liefering.
