= César Quintero =

César Quintero may refer to:

- César Quintero (baseball) (born 1982), Panamanian baseball player
- César Quintero (footballer) (born 1988), Colombian footballer
