= César Jiménez (footballer) =

Spanish footballer

César
Personal information
- Full name: César Jiménez Jiménez
- Date of birth: 28 November 1977 (age 48)
- Place of birth: Ávila, Spain
- Height: 1.84 m (6 ft 0 in)
- Position: Centre-back

Youth career
- 1993–1996: Real Madrid

Senior career*
Years	Team	Apps	(Gls)
1996–1997	Real Madrid C	12	(1)
1997–1998	Real Madrid B	0	(0)
1998–2002	Zaragoza B	109	(5)
2001–2007	Zaragoza	14	(1)
2002–2004	→ Almería (loan)	59	(4)
Total		194	(11)

International career
1993	Spain U16	3	(0)
- * Club domestic league appearances and goals

César Jiménez Jiménez (born 28 November 1977), known simply as César, is a Spanish retired footballer who played as a central defender.

He played almost exclusively with Real Zaragoza, in a career marred by injuries.

== Club career ==
Born in Ávila, Castile and León, César was brought up through the Real Madrid youth academy, and played his first senior season with the C team in the Segunda División B. In October 1998 he signed for Real Zaragoza, but represented mainly the reserves during his spell at La Romareda.

In 2000–01's 18th round, César made his La Liga debut in a 4–2 home win over CA Osasuna, and scored in the game. After the Aragonese's relegation the following campaign, he served a two-year loan at Segunda División club UD Almería.

César's Zaragoza career was blighted by injuries, as he only totalled 17 competitive appearances in five seasons. In a January 2005 match against Real Madrid, a tough challenge by Luís Figo would all but mean his untimely retirement, completed in March 2007.

== Honours ==
Zaragoza

- Copa del Rey: 2000–01
