= 2001–02 RCD Espanyol season =

RCD Espanyol 2001–02 Season

RCD Espanyol
2001–02 season
- Head coach: Paco Flores
- Stadium: Estadi Olímpic
- La Liga: 14th
- Copa del Rey: Round of 64
- Top goalscorer: Raúl Tamudo (17)
- Average home league attendance: 19,984

The 2001–02 season was the 67th season in the existence of RCD Espanyol and the club's eighth consecutive season in the top flight of Spanish football. In addition to the domestic league, Espanyol participated in this season's edition of the Copa del Rey.

== First-team squad ==
Updated on 18 January 2023

Note: Flags indicate national team as defined under FIFA eligibility rules; some limited exceptions apply. Players may hold more than one non-FIFA nationality.

No.	Pos.	Nation	Player
1	GK	ESP	Juan Luis Mora
2	DF	ESP	Fran
3	DF	ARG	Pablo Rotchen
4	DF	ESP	Alberto Lopo
5	DF	ESP	Toni Soldevilla
6	MF	ESP	Òscar
7	MF	ESP	Toni Velamazán
8	MF	ESP	Ángel Morales
9	FW	ESP	Manel
10	FW	PAR	Miguel Ángel Benítez
11	FW	ARG	Martín Posse
12	FW	URU	Antonio Pacheco
13	GK	ESP	Alfred Argensó
14	MF	ESP	Quique de Lucas
15	FW	MEX	Francisco Palencia
16	DF	ESP	Ricardo Cavas

No.	Pos.	Nation	Player
17	FW	ESP	David Aganzo
18	MF	ARG	Mauro Navas
19	DF	ESP	David García
20	MF	ROU	Cătălin Munteanu
21	MF	ESP	Iván Díaz
22	MF	ESP	Àlex Fernández
23	FW	ESP	Raúl Tamudo
24	MF	ESP	Roger
25	MF	POR	Paulo Sousa
27	DF	ESP	David Català
30	MF	ESP	Raúl Vates
32	DF	ESP	Marc Bertrán
33	MF	ESP	Moisés Hurtado
—	GK	ESP	Salvador Balbuena

Left club during the season.

Note: Flags indicate national team as defined under FIFA eligibility rules; some limited exceptions apply. Players may hold more than one non-FIFA nationality.

No.	Pos.	Nation	Player
28	DF	ESP	Bruno Saltor

== Competitions ==
=== La Liga ===
==== League table ====
Pos	Team	Pld	W	D	L	GF	GA	GD	Pts	Qualification or relegation
12	Valladolid	38	13	9	16	45	58	−13	48	
13	Real Sociedad	38	13	8	17	48	54	−6	47 (Note: ESP 1–2 RSO; RSO 1–0 ESP)	
14	Espanyol	38	13	8	17	47	56	−9	47	
15	Villarreal	38	11	10	17	46	55	−9	43 (Note: MLL 0–1 VIL; VIL 2–1 MLL)	Qualification for the Intertoto Cup second round
16	Mallorca	38	11	10	17	40	52	−12	43	

Source: LFP
Rules for classification: 1st points; 2nd head-to-head points; 3rd head-to-head goal difference; 4th head-to-head goals scored; 5th goal difference; 6th number of goals scored; 7th Fair-play points

== Statistics ==
=== Players statistics ===
Updated on 18 January 2023

No.	Pos	Nat	Player	Total		La Liga		Copa del Rey	
No.	Pos	Nat	Player	Apps	Goals	Apps	Goals	Apps	Goals
1	GK	(Spain) ESP	Juan Luis Mora	24	-33	22+1	-32	1	-1
4	DF	(Spain) ESP	Alberto Lopo	33	1	32+1	1	0	0
5	DF	(Spain) ESP	Toni Soldevilla	29	0	28	0	1	0
3	DF	(Argentina) ARG	Pablo Rotchen	28	1	25+2	1	1	0
16	DF	(Spain) ESP	Ricardo Cavas	24	1	22+2	1	0	0
8	MF	(Spain) ESP	Ángel Morales	36	0	26+9	0	1	0
14	MF	(Spain) ESP	Quique de Lucas	34	7	29+4	7	1	0
22	MF	(Spain) ESP	Àlex Fernández	34	2	30+3	2	1	0
24	MF	(Spain) ESP	Roger	24	1	22+2	1	0	0
23	FW	(Spain) ESP	Raúl Tamudo	36	17	35	17	1	0
11	FW	(Argentina) ARG	Martín Posse	29	4	20+8	4	1	0
13	GK	(Spain) ESP	Alfred Argensó	16	-24	16	-24	0	0
18	MF	(Argentina) ARG	Mauro Navas	20	0	20	0	0	0
15	FW	(Mexico) MEX	Francisco Palencia	31	6	18+12	6	1	0
2	DF	(Spain) ESP	Fran	18	0	15+2	0	1	0
19	DF	(Spain) ESP	David García	18	0	15+2	0	1	0
6	MF	(Spain) ESP	Òscar	11	1	4+7	1	0	0
7	MF	(Spain) ESP	Toni Velamazán	16	1	13+3	1	0	0
25	MF	(Portugal) POR	Paulo Sousa	9	0	8+1	0	0	0
12	FW	(Uruguay) URU	Antonio Pacheco	13	3	7+6	3	0	0
20	MF	(Romania) ROU	Cătălin Munteanu	13	1	4+8	1	1	0
17	FW	(Spain) ESP	David Aganzo	11	0	2+9	0	0	0
21	MF	(Spain) ESP	Iván Díaz	9	0	2+7	0	0	0
30	MF	(Spain) ESP	Raúl Vates	4	0	2+2	0	0	0
27	DF	(Spain) ESP	David Català	6	0	1+5	0	0	0
9	FW	(Spain) ESP	Manel	3	0	0+2	0	1	0
10	FW	(Paraguay) PAR	Miguel Ángel Benítez	4	0	0+4	0	0	0
28	DF	(Spain) ESP	Bruno Saltor	2	0	0+1	0	1	0
32	DF	(Spain) ESP	Marc Bertrán	1	0	0+1	0	0	0
33	MF	(Spain) ESP	Moisés Hurtado	1	0	0+1	0	0	0
	GK	(Spain) ESP	Salvador Balbuena	0	0	0	0	0	0
