= 2002–03 RCD Espanyol season =

RCD Espanyol
2002–03 season
- President: Daniel Sánchez Llibre
- Head coach: Juande Ramos (to 7 October); Ramón Moya (8 October to 18 December); Javier Clemente (from 19 December)
- Stadium: Estadi Olímpic Lluís Companys
- La Liga: 17th
- Copa del Rey: Round of 64
- Top goalscorer: League: Savo Milošević (12); All: Savo Milošević (12)

The 2002–03 RCD Espanyol season was the club's 9th consecutive season in the top division of the Spanish football league, La Liga, and the 103rd in the club's history.

== La Liga ==
Pos	Team	Pld	W	D	L	GF	GA	GD	Pts	Qualification or relegation
15	Villarreal	38	11	12	15	44	53	−9	45	Qualification for the Intertoto Cup third round
16	Racing Santander	38	13	5	20	54	64	−10	44	Qualification for the Intertoto Cup second round
17	Espanyol	38	10	13	15	48	54	−6	43	
18	Recreativo (R)	38	8	12	18	35	61	−26	36	Relegation to the Segunda División
19	Alavés (R)	38	8	11	19	38	68	−30	35	Relegation to the Segunda División

Source: LFP
Rules for classification: 1st points; 2nd head-to-head points; 3rd head-to-head goal difference; 4th head-to-head away goals scored; 5th goal difference; 6th number of goals scored; 7th Fair-play points
(R) Relegated

== Squad statistics ==
Updated on 23 January 2023

No.	Pos	Nat	Player	Total		La Liga		Copa del Rey	
No.	Pos	Nat	Player	Apps	Goals	Apps	Goals	Apps	Goals
1	GK	(Spain) ESP	Toni Jiménez	20	0	20	0	0	0
2	MF	(Spain) ESP	Óscar García	17	1	10+6	1	0+1	0
3	DF	(Spain) ESP	David García	30	1	30	1	0	0
4	DF	(Spain) ESP	Alberto Lopo	24	1	23	1	1	0
5	MF	(Spain) ESP	Toni Soldevilla	34	2	33	2	1	0
6	DF	(Spain) ESP	Iván Amaya	12	0	8+3	0	1	0
7	MF	(Spain) ESP	Toni Velamazán	21	1	5+16	1	0	0
8	MF	(Spain) ESP	Ángel Morales	34	1	25+9	1	0	0
9	FW	(Federal Republic of Yugoslavia) YUG	Savo Milošević	35	12	24+10	12	1	0
10	MF	(Spain) ESP	Roger	31	9	30+1	9	0	0
11	FW	(Argentina) ARG	Martín Posse	22	0	5+16	0	1	0
12	MF	(Italy) ITA	Moreno Torricelli	18	0	18	0	0	0
14	MF	(France) FRA	Alain Boghossian	6	0	2+3	0	1	0
15	MF	(Brazil) BRA	Fredson	17	0	9+7	0	0+1	0
17	MF	(Argentina) ARG	Maxi Rodríguez	38	7	36+1	7	1	0
18	DF	(Argentina) ARG	Mauro Navas	14	0	13+1	0	0	0
19	MF	(Spain) ESP	Arteaga	2	0	0+2	0	0	0
20	DF	(Spain) ESP	Xavi Roca	2	0	0+1	0	1	0
20	MF	(Spain) ESP	Marc Bertrán	10	0	9+1	0	0	0
21	MF	(Spain) ESP	Iván de la Peña	29	0	18+11	0	0	0
22	MF	(Spain) ESP	Àlex Fernández	21	0	9+11	0	1	0
23	FW	(Spain) ESP	Raúl Tamudo	30	10	24+5	10	1	0
24	DF	(Ivory Coast) CIV	Cyril Domoraud	33	3	33	3	0	0
25	GK	(Spain) ESP	Sergio Sánchez	6	0	6	0	0	0
26	GK	(Spain) ESP	Gorka Iraizoz	0	0	0	0	0	0
28	MF	(Spain) ESP	Moisés Hurtado	0	0	0	0	0	0
30	MF	(Spain) ESP	Albert Crusat	5	0	3+2	0	0	0
31	FW	(Spain) ESP	Jonathan Soriano	1	0	0+1	0	0	0
32	DF	(Spain) ESP	Daniel Jarque	7	0	5+1	0	0+1	0
Players who have left the club after the start of the season:
	GK	(Spain) ESP	Alfred Argensó	13	0	12	0	1	0
	DF	(Spain) ESP	Ricardo Cavas	3	0	3	0	0	0
	MF	(Spain) ESP	José Juan Luque	8	0	5+3	0	0	0
