= 2003–04 RCD Espanyol season =

RCD Espanyol
2003–04 season
- President: Daniel Sánchez Llibre
- Head coach: Javier Clemente (to 3 November); Luis Fernandez (from 4 November)
- Stadium: Estadi Olímpic Lluís Companys
- La Liga: 16th
- Copa del Rey: Round of 32
- Top goalscorer: League: Raúl Tamudo (20); All: Raúl Tamudo (20)

The 2003–04 RCD Espanyol season was the club's 10th consecutive season in the top division of the Spanish football league, La Liga, and the 104th in the club's history.

== First-team squad ==
Updated on 21 January 2024

Note: Flags indicate national team as defined under FIFA eligibility rules; some limited exceptions apply. Players may hold more than one non-FIFA nationality.

No.	Pos.	Nation	Player
1	GK	ESP	Toni Jiménez
2	DF	CMR	Pierre Womé
3	DF	ESP	David García
4	DF	ESP	Alberto Lopo
5	MF	ESP	Toni Soldevilla
6	MF	ESP	Óscar García
7	MF	ESP	Toni Velamazán
8	MF	ESP	Ángel Morales
9	MF	ESP	Iván de la Peña
10	MF	ARG	Maxi Rodríguez
12	MF	ITA	Moreno Torricelli
13	GK	BEL	Erwin Lemmens
14	MF	NED	Jordi Cruyff
15	MF	BRA	Fredson
16	FW	ROU	Claudiu Răducanu
17	DF	CIV	Cyril Domoraud (on loan from Milan)
18	MF	NED	Kevin Bobson

No.	Pos.	Nation	Player
19	DF	FRA	Grégory Vignal (on loan from Liverpool)
21	MF	TUR	Tayfun Korkut
22	MF	ESP	Àlex Fernández
23	FW	ESP	Raúl Tamudo
24	DF	ARG	Mauricio Pochettino
25	MF	MAR	Mustapha Hadji
26	GK	ESP	Gorka Iraizoz
26	MF	ESP	Marc Bertrán
28	MF	ESP	Moisés Hurtado
29	DF	ESP	Juan Ceballos
30	MF	ESP	Héctor Simón
31	DF	ESP	Carlos García
31	FW	ESP	Jonathan Soriano
32	DF	ESP	Daniel Jarque
33	FW	ESP	Coro
34	FW	ESP	Luismi

=== Left club during the season ===
Note: Flags indicate national team as defined under FIFA eligibility rules; some limited exceptions apply. Players may hold more than one non-FIFA nationality.

No. / Pos. / Nation / Player; — / MF / ARG / Adrián Bastía	No. / Pos. / Nation / Player; — / FW / ESP / Raúl Molina (on loan to Recreativo)

== Competitions ==
=== Overall record ===
Competition	First match	Last match	Starting round	Final position	Record							
Competition	First match	Last match	Starting round	Final position	Pld	W	D	L	GF	GA	GD	Win %
La Liga	30 August 2003	23 May 2004	Matchday 1	16th	38	13	4	21	48	64	−16	34.21
Copa del Rey	8 October 2003	16 December 2003	Round of 64	Round of 32	2	1	0	1	4	5	−1	50.00
Total					40	14	4	22	52	69	−17	35.00

=== La Liga ===
==== League table ====
Pos	Team	Pld	W	D	L	GF	GA	GD	Pts	Qualification or relegation
14	Albacete	38	13	8	17	40	48	−8	47	
15	Real Sociedad	38	11	13	14	49	53	−4	46	
16	Espanyol	38	13	4	21	48	64	−16	43	
17	Racing Santander (Note: Racing Santander were docked one point deduction due to using foreign players exceeds the quota during a match against Osasuna on 14 December 2003.)	38	11	10	17	48	63	−15	42	
18	Valladolid (R)	38	10	11	17	46	56	−10	41	Relegation to the Segunda División

Source: LFP
Rules for classification: 1st points; 2nd head-to-head points; 3rd head-to-head goal difference; 4th head-to-head goals scored; 5th goal difference; 6th number of goals scored; 7th Fair-play points
(R) Relegated

==== Results summary ====
Overall								Home						Away					
Pld	W	D	L	GF	GA	GD	Pts	W	D	L	GF	GA	GD	W	D	L	GF	GA	GD
38	13	4	21	48	64	−16	43	8	2	9	24	26	−2	5	2	12	24	38	−14

==== Matches ====
Date	Venue	Opponent	Score
30 August	H	Real Sociedad	1–1
3 September	A	Real Betis	2–2
14 September	H	Villarreal	1–2
21 September	A	Real Valladolid	1–3
28 September	H	Málaga	1–2
5 October	A	Real Madrid	1–2
19 October	A	Valencia	0–4
26 October	H	Celta de Vigo	0–4
29 October	A	Racing de Santander	1–0
2 November	H	Real Zaragoza	0–2
8 November	A	Athletic Bilbao	0–1
23 November	H	Sevilla	1–0
30 November	A	Albacete	1–2
3 December	H	Osasuna	0–1
7 December	A	Atlético Madrid	0–2
13 December	H	Barcelona	1–3
21 December	A	Deportivo de La Coruña	1–2
4 January	H	Mallorca	2–0
11 January	A	Real Murcia	1–0

Date	Venue	Opponent	Score
18 January	A	Real Sociedad	1–3
25 January	H	Real Betis	1–2
1 February	A	Villarreal	1–0
8 February	H	Real Valladolid	2–0
15 February	A	Málaga	2–5
21 February	H	Real Madrid	2–4
29 February	H	Valencia	2–1
6 March	A	Celta de Vigo	5–1
14 March	H	Racing de Santander	0–1
21 March	A	Real Zaragoza	1–1
27 March	H	Athletic Bilbao	2–1
3 April	A	Sevilla	0–1
11 April	H	Albacete	1–1
18 April	A	Osasuna	3–1
24 April	H	Atlético Madrid	3–1
2 May	A	Barcelona	1–4
9 May	H	Deportivo de La Coruña	2–0
16 May	A	Mallorca	2–4
23 May	H	Real Murcia	2–0

=== Copa del Rey ===
Round	Date	Venue	Opponent	Score
Round of 64	8 October	A	Elche	3–2
Round of 32	16 December	A	Celta de Vigo	1–3
