= 2004–05 RCD Espanyol season =

RCD Espanyol
2004–05 season
- President: Daniel Sánchez Llibre
- Head coach: Miguel Ángel Lotina
- Stadium: Estadi Olímpic Lluís Companys
- La Liga: 5th
- Copa del Rey: Round of 64
- Top goalscorer: League: Maxi Rodríguez (15); All: Maxi Rodríguez (15)

The 2004–05 RCD Espanyol season was the club's 11th consecutive season in the top division of the Spanish football league, La Liga, and the 105th in the club's history.

== First-team squad ==
Updated on 21 January 2024

Note: Flags indicate national team as defined under FIFA eligibility rules; some limited exceptions apply. Players may hold more than one non-FIFA nationality.

No.	Pos.	Nation	Player
1	GK	BEL	Erwin Lemmens
2	DF	ARG	Hugo Ibarra (on loan from Porto)
3	DF	ESP	David García
4	DF	ESP	Alberto Lopo
5	MF	ESP	Toni Soldevilla
6	DF	ARG	Mauricio Pochettino
7	MF	ESP	Toni Velamazán
8	MF	ESP	Ángel Morales
9	MF	ESP	Iván de la Peña
10	MF	ARG	Maxi Rodríguez
11	FW	ARG	Martín Posse
13	GK	CMR	Carlos Kameni
14	MF	ESP	Ito
15	MF	BRA	Fredson

No.	Pos.	Nation	Player
17	DF	ESP	Óscar Miñambres (on loan from Real Madrid)
18	DF	FRA	Didier Domi
19	FW	ESP	Dani García
20	FW	ESP	Coro
21	DF	ESP	Daniel Jarque
22	MF	ESP	Àlex Fernández
23	FW	ESP	Raúl Tamudo
24	MF	ESP	José Amavisca
26	GK	ESP	Biel Ribas
28	MF	ESP	Óscar Serrano
30	MF	ESP	Héctor Simón
31	FW	ESP	Jonathan Soriano
35	DF	ESP	Sergio Sánchez

== Competitions ==
=== Overall record ===
Competition	First match	Last match	Starting round	Final position	Record							
Competition	First match	Last match	Starting round	Final position	Pld	W	D	L	GF	GA	GD	Win %
La Liga	28 August 2004	29 May 2005	Matchday 1	5th	38	17	10	11	54	46	+8	44.74
Copa del Rey	27 October 2004	27 October 2004	Round of 64	Round of 64	1	0	1	0	1	1	+0	0.00
Total					39	17	11	11	55	47	+8	43.59

=== La Liga ===
==== League table ====
Pos	Team	Pld	W	D	L	GF	GA	GD	Pts	Qualification or relegation
3	Villarreal	38	18	11	9	69	37	+32	65	Qualification for the Champions League third qualifying round
4	Real Betis	38	16	14	8	62	50	+12	62	Qualification for the Champions League third qualifying round
5	Espanyol	38	17	10	11	54	46	+8	61	Qualification for the UEFA Cup first round
6	Sevilla	38	17	9	12	44	41	+3	60	Qualification for the UEFA Cup first round
7	Valencia	38	14	16	8	54	39	+15	58	Qualification for the Intertoto Cup third round

Source: LFP
Rules for classification: 1st points; 2nd head-to-head points; 3rd head-to-head goal difference; 4th head-to-head goals scored; 5th goal difference; 6th number of goals scored; 7th Fair-play points

==== Results by round ====
Round	1	2	3	4	5	6	7	8	9	10	11	12	13	14	15	16	17	18	19	20	21	22	23	24	25	26	27	28	29	30	31	32	33	34	35	36	37	38
Ground	H	A	H	A	H	A	H	A	H	A	H	A	H	A	H	A	A	H	A	A	H	A	H	A	H	A	H	A	H	A	H	A	H	A	H	H	A	H
Result	D	W	W	L	W	L	L	W	D	W	W	D	W	W	W	D	L	W	D	L	D	L	W	L	W	D	W	L	D	W	L	D	W	L	W	D	D	W
Position	11	4	1	4	3	5	10	4	7	5	3	4	3	3	3	3	5	4	4	5	4	7	6	7	6	6	3	5	6	5	6	6	4	6	5	6	6	5

Source: La Liga
A = Away; H = Home; W = Win; D = Draw; L = Loss

==== Results summary ====
Overall								Home						Away					
Pld	W	D	L	GF	GA	GD	Pts	W	D	L	GF	GA	GD	W	D	L	GF	GA	GD
38	17	10	11	54	46	+8	61	12	5	2	34	18	+16	5	5	9	20	28	−8

==== Matches ====
Date	Venue	Opponent	Score
28 August	H	Deportivo de La Coruña	1–1
12 September	A	Real Betis	4–1
18 September	H	Real Madrid	1–0
22 September	A	Getafe	0–2
26 September	H	Málaga	1–0
3 October	A	Albacete	0–1
16 October	H	Barcelona	0–1
24 October	A	Levante	2–0
31 October	H	Villarreal	0–0
7 November	A	Real Sociedad	2–0
13 November	H	Racing de Santander	2–1
21 November	A	Sevilla	0–1
27 November	H	Atlético Madrid	2–1
5 December	A	Real Zaragoza	1–0
12 December	H	Mallorca	2–1
19 December	A	Numancia	0–0
22 December	A	Valencia	0–3
9 January	H	Osasuna	4–1
16 January	A	Athletic Bilbao	1–1

Date	Venue	Opponent	Score
23 January	A	Deportivo de La Coruña	1–4
30 January	H	Real Betis	2–2
5 February	A	Real Madrid	0–4
13 February	H	Getafe	2–0
20 February	A	Málaga	2–3
26 February	H	Albacete Balompié	2–1
1 March	A	Barcelona	0–0
6 March	H	Levante	2–1
13 March	A	Villarreal	1–4
19 March	H	Real Sociedad	2–2
3 April	A	Racing de Santander	3–1
10 April	H	Sevilla	1–3
16 April	A	Atlético Madrid	0–0
24 April	H	Real Zaragoza	3–1
1 May	A	Mallorca	2–3
8 May	H	Numancia	3–0
15 May	H	Valencia	2–2
22 May	A	Osasuna	1–1
29 May	H	Athletic Bilbao	2–0

=== Copa del Rey ===
Round	Date	Venue	Opponent	Score
Round of 64	27 October	A	Terrassa	1–1 (a.e.t.) (2–4 pen.)
