= 1998–99 RCD Espanyol season =

RCD Espanyol 1998–99 Season

RCD Espanyol
1998–99 season
- President: Daniel Sánchez Llibre
- Head coach: Marcelo Bielsa (to 19 October); Miguel Ángel Brindisi (from 20 October)
- Stadium: Estadi Olímpic de Montjuïc
- La Liga: 7th
- Copa del Rey: Quarter-finals
- UEFA Intertoto Cup: Semi-finals
- Top goalscorer: League: Raúl Tamudo (8); All: Raúl Tamudo (10)

The 1998–99 season was the 64th season in the existence of RCD Espanyol and the club's fifth consecutive season in the top flight of Spanish football. In addition to the domestic league, Espanyol participated in this season's edition of the Copa del Rey and UEFA Intertoto Cup.

== La Liga ==
Pos	Team	Pld	W	D	L	GF	GA	GD	Pts	Qualification or relegation
5	Celta Vigo	38	17	13	8	69	41	+28	64	Qualification for the UEFA Cup first round
6	Deportivo La Coruña	38	17	12	9	55	43	+12	63	Qualification for the UEFA Cup first round
7	Espanyol	38	16	13	9	49	38	+11	61	Qualification for the Intertoto Cup third round
8	Athletic Bilbao (Note: Despite being qualified and registered, Athletic Bilbao refused to play Intertoto)	38	17	9	12	53	47	+6	60	
9	Zaragoza	38	16	9	13	57	46	+11	57	

Source: LFP
Rules for classification: 1) points; 2) head-to-head points; 3) head-to-head goal difference; 4) head-to-head goals scored; 5) goal difference; 6) number of goals scored.

== Squad statistics ==
Updated on 29 January 2023

No.	Pos	Nat	Player	Total		La Liga		Copa del Rey		Intertoto	
No.	Pos	Nat	Player	Apps	Goals	Apps	Goals	Apps	Goals	Apps	Goals
1	GK	(Spain) ESP	Toni Jiménez	42	0	38	0	4	0	0	0
2	DF	(Spain) ESP	Cristóbal	39	2	35	1	4	1	0	0
3	DF	(Argentina) ARG	Federico Domínguez	5	0	5	0	0	0	0	0
4	DF	(Spain) ESP	Nando	38	1	31+3	1	4	0	0	0
5	DF	(Argentina) ARG	Mauricio Pochettino	29	1	26	0	3	1	0	0
6	MF	(Spain) ESP	Sergio González	40	1	23+11	0	4	1	2	0
7	FW	(Argentina) ARG	Martín Posse	36	6	23+9	4	4	2	0	0
9	FW	(Argentina) ARG	Juan Esnáider	13	2	13	2	0	0	0	0
9	FW	(Cameroon) CMR	Samuel Eto'o	1	0	0	0	0+1	0	0	0
10	MF	(Federal Republic of Yugoslavia) YUG	Branko Brnović	13	0	5+6	0	0+2	0	0	0
11	FW	(Spain) ESP	Manuel Serrano	5	1	1+3	1	0	0	1	0
12	DF	(Spain) ESP	Iván Helguera	40	2	37	2	3	0	0	0
14	MF	(Mexico) MEX	Germán Villa	12	0	12	0	0	0	0	0
15	MF	(Romania) ROU	Constantin Gâlcă	29	4	21+6	4	2	0	0	0
16	MF	(Spain) ESP	Nan Ribera	35	3	16+10	2	4	0	1+4	1
17	MF	(Spain) ESP	Pacheta	23	0	13+8	0	0+2	0	0	0
18	MF	(Croatia) CRO	Nenad Pralija	1	0	0+1	0	0	0	0	0
18	FW	(Uruguay) URU	Darío Silva	17	3	11+4	3	0+2	0	0	0
19	MF	(Spain) ESP	Arteaga	32	3	25+3	2	4	1	0	0
20	FW	(Paraguay) PAR	Miguel Ángel Benítez	36	9	23+9	7	4	2	0	0
21	FW	(Spain) ESP	Quique Martín	20	2	13+7	2	0	0	0	0
22	FW	(Spain) ESP	Raúl Tamudo	28	10	15+4	8	0+3	0	4+2	2
24	DF	(Federal Republic of Yugoslavia) YUG	Goran Milošević	7	0	0+1	0	0	0	6	0
25	GK	(Spain) ESP	Alfred Argensó	7	0	0	0	0+1	0	6	0
26	DF	(Spain) ESP	Joan Capdevila	38	4	27+2	4	4	0	5	0
27	MF	(Spain) ESP	Toni Soldevilla	1	0	0	0	0	0	1	0
28	MF	(Spain) ESP	Quique de Lucas	27	5	5+15	5	0+1	0	5+1	0
30	DF	(Spain) ESP	Alberto Lopo	2	0	0+2	0	0	0	0	0
34	MF	(Spain) ESP	Manolo Pérez	1	0	0+1	0	0	0	0	0
	DF	(Spain) ESP	Joaquín Macanás	5	0	0	0	0	0	4+1	0
	DF	(Spain) ESP	Pedro Nieto	5	1	0	0	0	0	5	1
	DF	(Spain) ESP	David Sánchez	2	0	0	0	0	0	2	0
	DF	(Chile) CHI	César Santis	0	0	0	0	0	0	0	0
	MF	(Spain) ESP	Àlex Fernández	5	1	0	0	0	0	5	1
	MF	(France) FRA	Jean-Philippe Javary	1	0	0	0	0	0	1	0
	MF	(Spain) ESP	José Mari	3	0	0	0	0	0	2+1	0
	MF	(Spain) ESP	Ángel Morales	3	0	0	0	0	0	3	0
	MF	(Spain) ESP	Xavier Morón	3	0	0	0	0	0	0+3	0
	MF	(Spain) ESP	Jordi Torrecilla	5	0	0	0	0	0	4+1	0
	FW	(Spain) ESP	Javi García	5	1	0	0	0	0	5	1
	FW	(Romania) ROU	Florin Răducioiu	2	1	0	0	0	0	2	1
	FW	(Spain) ESP	Diego Ribera	5	0	0	0	0	0	2+3	0
