= 2000 Copa del Rey final =

- Event: 1999–2000 Copa del Rey
Atlético Madrid	Espanyol
1	2
- Date: 27 May 2000
- Venue: Mestalla, Valencia
- Referee: Antonio Jesús López Nieto
- Attendance: 55,000
- Weather: Scattered clouds 21 °C (70 °F)

The 2000 Copa del Rey final was a football match between Atlético Madrid and Espanyol that took place on 27 May 2000 to decide the winner of the 1999–2000 Copa del Rey, the 98th staging of Spain's primary football cup.

The match was played at the Estadio Mestalla, Valencia CF's home stadium, with Espanyol beating Atlético Madrid 2–1 and earning their third Copa del Rey title.

== Route to the final ==
Atlético Madrid			Round	RCD Espanyol
Opponent	Result	Legs		Opponent	Result	Legs
			1st round	Córdoba	1–3	1–1 away; 0–2 away
Las Palmas	2–3	2–2 away; 0–1 home	2nd round	Albacete	0–2	0–0 away; 0–2 home
Real Unión	0–5	0–3 away; 0–2 home	Round of 16	Celta Vigo	3–1	2–1 home; 1–0 away
Rayo Vallecano	2–2 (a)	0–0 home; 2–2 away	Quarter-finals	Compostela	5–2	5–1 home; 0–1 away
Barcelona	6–0	3–0 home; 3–0 away	Semi-finals	Real Madrid	0–1	0–0 away; 1–0 home

== Match ==
=== Details ===
27 May 2000
21:00 CEST

Atlético Madrid	1–2	Espanyol
Hasselbaink 90'	Report	Tamudo 2'; Sergio 84'

Mestalla, Valencia
Attendance: 55,000
Referee: Antonio López Nieto

Atletico Madrid	Espanyol

ATLÉTICO MADRID:
GK	13	(Spain) Toni
DF	15	(Spain) Carlos Aguilera		(substituted off) 75'
DF	6	(Spain) Santi	(red card) 84'
DF	26	(Spain) Gaspar	(yellow card) 30'
DF	4	(Paraguay) Carlos Gamarra		(substituted off) 50'
DF	22	(Spain) Joan Capdevila
MF	8	(Spain) Rubén Baraja	(yellow card) 80'
MF	16	(Spain) Juan Carlos Valerón
MF	12	(Portugal) Hugo Leal
FW	19	(Spain) Kiko (c)
FW	17	(Netherlands) Jimmy Floyd Hasselbaink	(yellow card) 17'
Substitutes:
GK	1	(Spain) José Molina
DF	3	(Spain) Toni
MF	9	(Argentina) Santiago Solari		(substituted on) 75'
MF	14	(Argentina) Óscar Mena
MF	30	(Spain) José Juan Luque		(substituted on) 50'
Manager:
(Spain) Fernando Zambrano

ESPANYOL:
GK	25	(Argentina) Pablo Cavallero
DF	2	(Spain) Cristóbal
DF	4	(Spain) Nando	(yellow card) 60' (red card) 76'
DF	5	(Argentina) Mauricio Pochettino
DF	24	(Spain) Roger
MF	7	(Spain) Toni Velamazán
MF	8	(Spain) Sergio
MF	15	(Romania) Constantin Gâlcă
MF	19	(Spain) Arteaga (c)	(yellow card) 70'
FW	11	(Argentina) Martín Posse		(substituted off) 78'
FW	23	(Spain) Raúl Tamudo		(substituted off) 71'
Substitutes:
GK	1	(Spain) Juan Luis Mora
DF	3	(Argentina) Pablo Rotchen		(substituted on) 78'
DF	18	(Argentina) Mauro Navas
MF	14	(Spain) Enrique de Lucas
FW	9	(Spain) Manuel Serrano		(substituted on) 71'
Manager:
(Spain) Paco Flores

Copa del Rey
1999–2000 Winners
RCD Espanyol
Third title
