= List of RCD Espanyol records and statistics =

Reial Club Deportiu Espanyol de Barcelona is a Spanish association football club based in Barcelona. This list encompasses honours won by Espanyol and records set by the club and their players.

== Statistics ==
=== Statistics in La Liga ===
- Seasons in La Liga: 87
- Best position in La Liga: 3 (2 times)
- Worst position in La Liga: 20 (2019–20)
- Most goals scored in a season: 82 (1950–51)
- Most goals scored in a match: Espanyol 8 – Real Sociedad 0 (1941–42)
- Most goals conceded in a match: Athletic Bilbao 9 – Espanyol 0 (1928–29)

=== Overall seasons table in La Liga ===
Pos.	Club	Season In D1	Pl.	W	D	L	GS	GA	Dif.	Pts	Champion	2nd place	3rd place	4th place
7	Espanyol	87	2,816	997	667	1,152	3,812	4,156	−344	2998	0	0	4	5

Last updated: 1 September 2023
Pos. = Position; Pl = Match played; W = Win; D = Draw; L = Lost; GS = Goals Scored; GA = Goals against; P = Points.
Colors: Gold = winner; Silver = runner-up.

=== General statistics ===
- All-time top scorer: Raúl Tamudo with 140 goals
- Most Appearances: Raúl Tamudo with 389 matches
- Player who has won most titles: José Prat, David García, Alberto Lopo, Mauricio Pochettino and Raúl Tamudo with 2 titles

=== Milestone goals in La Liga ===
Goal Number	Date	Player	Match & result
1	10 February 1929	(Spain) José Prat	RCDE 3 – Real Unión 2
1000	26 April 1953	(Spain) Julián Arcas	RCDE 3 – Real Zaragoza 2
2000	26 May 1979	(Paraguay) Secundino Ayfuch	RCDE 1 – Burgos 0
3000	21 September 2003	(Netherlands) Kevin Bobson	Real Valladolid 3 – RCDE 1

== Goalscoring records ==
=== Domestic league goals ===
#	Nat.	Player	Years	Goals
1	(Spain)	Raúl Tamudo	1996–2010	129
2	(Spain)	Marañón	1974–1983	111
3	(Spain)	Julián Arcas	1946–1958	86

=== Zamora Winners ===
Nat.	Player	Season
(Spain)	Ricardo Zamora	1928–29
(France)	Marcel Domingo	1952–53
(Spain)	Toni Jiménez	1997–98
