= Iván de la Peña =

Spanish footballer

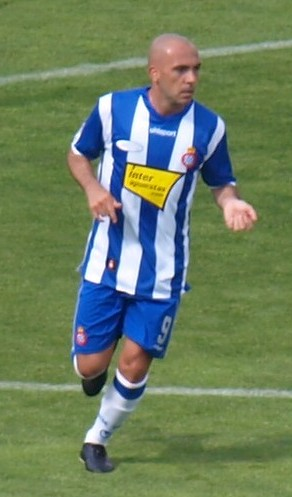
- De la Peña with Espanyol in 2009

Personal information
- Full name: Iván de la Peña López
- Date of birth: 6 May 1976 (age 50)
- Place of birth: Santander, Spain
- Height: 1.69 m (5 ft 7 in)
- Position: Midfielder

Youth career
- Racing Santander
- 1991–1993: Barcelona

Senior career*
Years	Team	Apps	(Gls)
1993–1995	Barcelona B	37	(5)
1995–1998	Barcelona	81	(11)
1998–2002	Lazio	16	(0)
1999–2000	→ Marseille (loan)	12	(1)
2000–2001	→ Barcelona (loan)	9	(0)
2002–2011	Espanyol	179	(8)
Total		334	(25)

International career
1991–1992	Spain U16	17	(2)
1992	Spain U17	4	(1)
1994	Spain U18	7	(3)
1995	Spain U20	5	(2)
1995–1996	Spain U21	10	(1)
1996	Spain U23	4	(0)
2005	Spain	5	(0)
Medal record
Representing Spain
UEFA European Under-21 Championship
Runner-up	1996 Spain
- * Club domestic league appearances and goals

Iván de la Peña López (Spanish pronunciation: [iˈβan delaˈpeɲa]; born 6 May 1976) is a Spanish former professional footballer who played as a central midfielder.

Having started out at Barcelona, he closed out his 18-year senior career, where he earned the nicknames El Pequeño Buda ('Little Buddha') and Lo Pelat ('The Shaven One') due to his shaven head and small stature, at neighbouring Espanyol, amassing La Liga totals of 269 games and 19 goals. He won the 2005–06 Copa del Rey with the latter club, and several others with the former.

De la Peña earned caps for Spain in 2005.

== Club career ==
Born in Santander, Cantabria, de la Peña was recruited to FC Barcelona's academy in 1991 and made his senior debut for the reserves two years later. He went on to play 37 games for them, and first-team manager Johan Cruyff handed him his official debut for the main squad on 3 September 1995 as he came on as a substitute – and scored – in a 2–0 away win against Real Valladolid; at 19, he was initially regarded as the natural successor to Pep Guardiola. However, he gradually fell out of favour and found himself dropped, although he netted a career-best seven league goals in that rookie season.

With the arrival of Bobby Robson in 1996, de la Peña was given a second chance to establish himself in the team. He subsequently developed a partnership with Ronaldo and was a prominent member of the squad that won the Copa del Rey/UEFA Cup Winners' Cup/UEFA Supercup treble in 1997. He was also voted best young player by newspaper El País twice during this timeframe.

De la Peña was deemed surplus to requirements at Barça once again after another Dutch coach was appointed, Louis van Gaal, and he was consequently transferred to SS Lazio along with Fernando Couto. However, he failed to establish himself in Serie A and was loaned to Olympique de Marseille. This move was not successful either, and he returned to Barcelona on loan for 2000–01; after only appearing nine times throughout the season under Lorenzo Serra Ferrer (one start, against Racing de Santander), he returned to Italy, being released the following summer.

On 29 August 2002, de la Peña signed a one-year deal with Barcelona neighbours RCD Espanyol, where he produced some of the best football in his career. In 2004–05, he helped the Catalan club to finish fifth in La Liga, enabling it to qualify for the UEFA Cup. In the 2006 domestic cup final, he masterminded a 4–1 victory over Real Zaragoza, being directly involved in two goals: Raúl Tamudo scored in the second minute when he headed in a rebound following a de la Peña free kick, and the pair combined again to set up Luis García; as a result, Espanyol again qualified for the UEFA Cup and eventually reached the competition final, losing to Sevilla FC on penalties.

From 2007 to 2009, with his contract extended, de la Peña was severely hindered by injury problems. However, on 21 February 2009, he managed to net twice in a 2–1 win at Barça in the Derbi Barceloní, as one side ranked first in the league and the other last.

After the death of new captain Daniel Jarque in August 2009, de la Peña was named as his replacement. His physical problems continued to bother him tremendously, to a point which he said that if this became a major issue he would retire, which happened on 22 May 2011 at the age of 35 at the end of a home match against Sevilla.

== International career ==
De la Peña, alongside the likes of Gaizka Mendieta, Fernando Morientes and Raúl, played for the Spanish under-21s at both the 1996 UEFA European Championship and the 1996 Summer Olympics. He helped the nation reach the quarter-finals in the latter.

Despite this, de la Peña did not make his debut for the senior team until 9 February 2005, at the age of 28 years and 9 months in a 5–0 victory over San Marino for the 2006 FIFA World Cup qualifiers held in Almería. He made a further four appearances until the end of the year, his last being against the same opponents.

== Style of play ==
De la Peña was known for his technical skills and accurate passing ability.

== Post-retirement ==
On 8 June 2011, de la Peña joined Serie A club AS Roma's coaching staff under new manager Luis Enrique, a former Barcelona teammate. It was announced in August that he would be taking a leave of absence for family reasons.

De la Peña subsequently worked as a player agent, with his agency Footalent representing Barcelona youth products Carles Aleñá, Eric García and Gavi among others.

== Personal life ==
De la Peña's son, also named Iván (born 2001), played as a defender in the lower leagues.

On 6 July 2000, he married Lourdes Asensi, daughter of the legendary Barcelona player Juan Manuel Asensi.

== Career statistics ==
=== Club ===
Club	Season	League			Cup (Note: Includes Copa del Rey, Coupe de France, Coppa Italia)		Continental		Other		Total	
Club	Season	Division	Apps	Goals	Apps	Goals	Apps	Goals	Apps	Goals	Apps	Goals
Barcelona B	1993–94	Segunda División	3	0	—		—		—		3	0
Barcelona B	1994–95	Segunda División	31	4	—		—		—		31	4
Barcelona B	1995–96	Segunda División	3	1	—		—		—		3	1
Barcelona B	Total		37	5	—		—		—		37	5
Barcelona	1995–96	La Liga	31	7	4	0	7 (Note: Appearances in UEFA Cup)	2	—		42	9
Barcelona	1996–97	La Liga	33	2	2	0	6 (Note: Appearances in UEFA Cup Winners' Cup)	0	1 (Note: Appearance in Supercopa de España)	1	42	3
Barcelona	1997–98	La Liga	17	2	2	0	2 (Note: Appearances in UEFA Champions League)	0	0	0	21	2
Barcelona	Total		81	11	8	0	15	2	1	1	105	14
Lazio	1998–99	Serie A	15	0	3	0	4	1	1 (Note: Appearance in Supercoppa Italiana)	0	23	1
Lazio	2001–02	Serie A	1	0	1	0	0	0	—		2	0
Lazio	Total		16	0	4	0	4	1	1	0	25	1
Marseille (loan)	1999–2000	Ligue 1	12	1	0	0	7	0	—		19	1
Barcelona (loan)	2000–01	La Liga	9	0	1	0	3	0	—		12	0
Espanyol	2002–03	La Liga	29	0	0	0	—		—		29	0
Espanyol	2003–04	La Liga	25	1	0	0	—		—		25	1
Espanyol	2004–05	La Liga	29	3	1	0	—		—		30	3
Espanyol	2005–06	La Liga	30	0	6	0	8	0	—		44	0
Espanyol	2006–07	La Liga	26	0	1	0	10	1	1	0	38	1
Espanyol	2007–08	La Liga	12	0	3	0	—		—		15	0
Espanyol	2008–09	La Liga	22	4	0	0	—		—		22	4
Espanyol	2009–10	La Liga	4	0	1	0	—		—		5	0
Espanyol	2010–11	La Liga	2	0	0	0	—		—		2	0
Espanyol	Total		179	8	12	0	18	1	1	0	210	9
Career total			334	25	24	0	47	4	3	1	408	30

=== International ===
Spain
Year	Apps	Goals
2005	5	0
Total	5	0

== Honours ==
Barcelona

- La Liga: 1997–98
- Copa del Rey: 1996–97, 1997–98
- Supercopa de España: 1996
- UEFA Cup Winners' Cup: 1996–97
- UEFA Super Cup: 1997

Lazio

- Supercoppa Italiana: 1998
- UEFA Cup Winners' Cup: 1998–99

Espanyol

- Copa del Rey: 2005–06
- UEFA Cup runner-up: 2006–07

Spain

- UEFA European Under-21 Championship runner-up: 1996

Individual

- Don Balón Award – Breakthrough Player of the Year: 1995–96, 1996–97
