= Gorka Iraizoz =

Spanish footballer (born 1981)

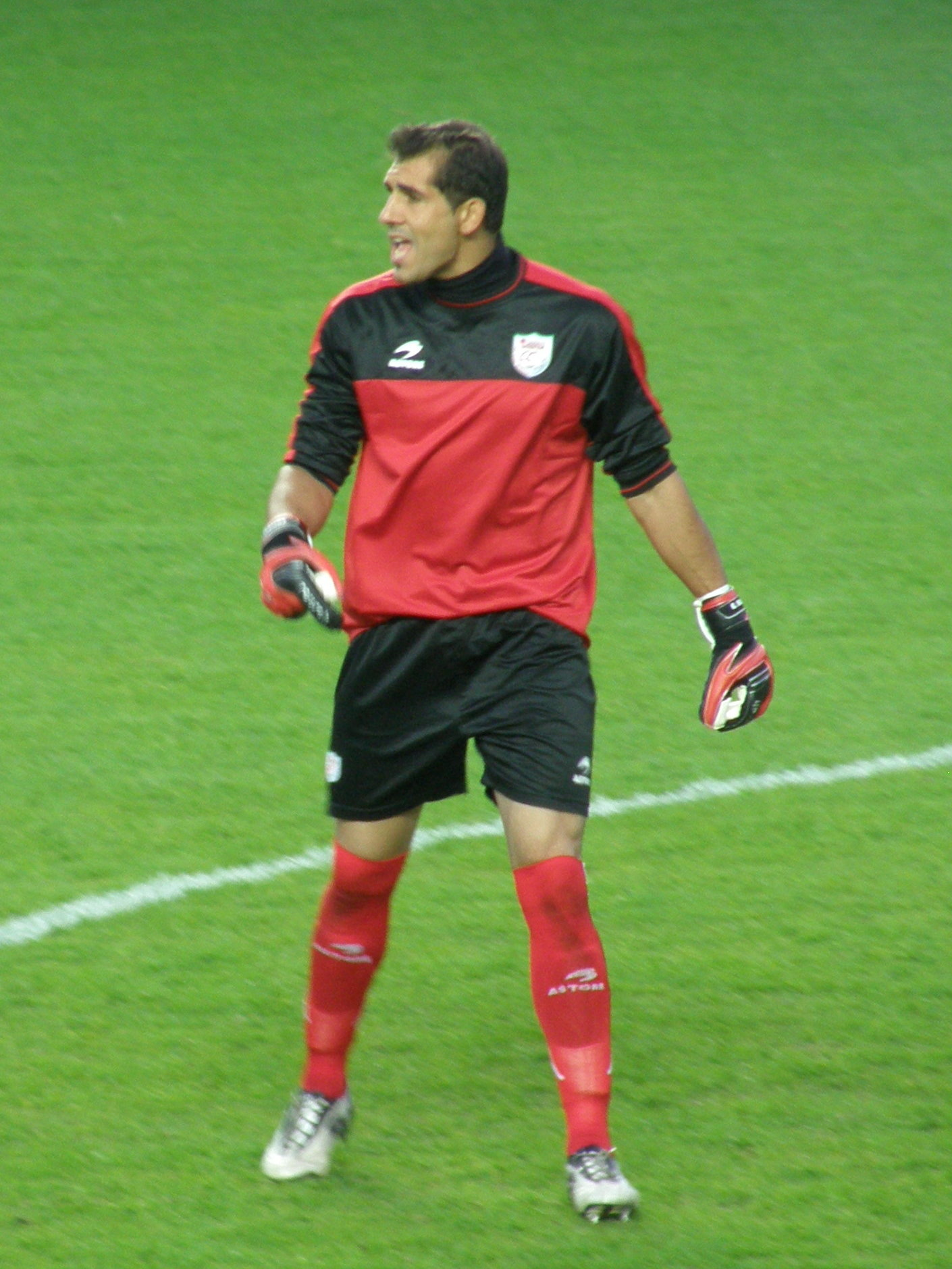
- Iraizoz with the Basque Country in 2011

Personal information
- Full name: Gorka Iraizoz Moreno
- Date of birth: 6 March 1981 (age 45)
- Place of birth: Pamplona, Spain
- Height: 1.91 m (6 ft 3 in)
- Position: Goalkeeper

Youth career
- 1998–1999: Chantrea

Senior career*
Years	Team	Apps	(Gls)
1999–2000	Basconia	20	(0)
2000–2001	Bilbao Athletic	0	(0)
2001	→ Gernika (loan)	14	(0)
2001–2002	Gernika	36	(0)
2002–2004	Espanyol B	59	(0)
2004–2007	Espanyol	23	(0)
2004–2005	→ Eibar (loan)	41	(0)
2007–2017	Athletic Bilbao	315	(0)
2017–2019	Girona	16	(0)
Total		524	(0)

International career
2006–2016	Basque Country	12	(0)

Managerial career
- 2022–2023: Gernika (assistant)
- 2024: Logroñés (assistant)
- 2024–2025: Gernika
- * Club domestic league appearances and goals

Gorka Iraizoz Moreno (born 6 March 1981) is a Spanish former professional footballer who played as a goalkeeper. He is currently a manager.

He spent most of his 20-year senior career with Athletic Bilbao, appearing in 392 official games. In La Liga he also represented Espanyol and Girona, winning the 2006 Copa del Rey with the first club.

== Club career ==
=== Early career and Espanyol ===
Iraizoz was born in Pamplona, Navarre and raised in nearby Ansoáin. After beginning his football career with local club UDC Chantrea, he moved to the Basque Country with Athletic Bilbao, serving stints with affiliates CD Basconia and Bilbao Athletic.

Arriving at RCD Espanyol in July 2002, Iraizoz spent two seasons with its B side, also having a loan spell at SD Eibar in the Segunda División. He made his La Liga debut on 21 December 2005, in a 2–1 away win against Deportivo de La Coruña. He was second choice behind Carlos Kameni for the 2006–07 season, but was the regular in the team's run to the final of the UEFA Cup, notably excelling in the quarter-final second leg away to S.L. Benfica (0–0 draw, 3–2 on aggregate).

During his time in Barcelona, Iraizoz learned to speak fluent Catalan.

=== Athletic Bilbao ===
On 7 August 2007, Iraizoz signed for Athletic Bilbao for €4.6 million, returning to the club he spent one-and-a-half seasons with, this time as the undisputed starter. However, due to a severe injury, he was left out of the squad for the second part of the campaign, and his place (and shirt number) was taken by 37-year-old Armando, signed from Cádiz CF until June 2008.

Iraizoz rarely missed a league game the following years. On 16 January 2010, his Player of the match performance helped the team hold on to its early home lead against Real Madrid, constantly denying Kaká and Cristiano Ronaldo's efforts. Additionally, he was in goal during the 2009 and 2012 finals of the Copa del Rey lost to FC Barcelona, and also helped defeat that opponent 5–1 on aggregate in the 2015 Supercopa de España for his only accolade at the San Mamés Stadium.

In the opening match of 2014–15, at Málaga CF, Iraizoz appeared to score a last-minute equaliser with a header, but the goal was disallowed, apparently incorrectly. Having lost his starting place to Kepa Arrizabalaga, at the end of the 2016–17 season Athletic announced that the 36-year-old would be leaving the club at the end of his contract.

=== Girona ===
On 14 June 2017, Iraizoz agreed to a two-year deal at Girona FC, promoted to the top flight for the first time ever. He spent most of his spell at the Estadi Montilivi as backup to Yassine Bounou.

Iraizoz left the club at the end of the 2018–19 campaign, which ended in relegation.

== International career ==
Iraizoz never earned any caps for Spain at any level. He did feature for the unofficial Basque Country regional team.

== Coaching career ==
After retiring aged 38, Iraizoz later worked as manager of Barakaldo's youths, goalkeeper coach of its first team and assistant at Gernika Club and SD Logroñés under former Athletic player Aitor Larrazábal. After the latter became Gernika's sporting director in May 2024, he named him head coach at the Segunda Federación side; he avoided relegation in the last match of his sole season, then left.

== Career statistics ==
Appearances and goals by club, season and competition
Club	Season	League			Cup		Europe		Other		Total	
Club	Season	Division	Apps	Goals	Apps	Goals	Apps	Goals	Apps	Goals	Apps	Goals
Bilbao Athletic	2000–01	Segunda División B	0	0	—		—		—		0	0
Gernika (loan)	2000–01	Segunda División B	14	0	—		—		—		14	0
Gernika	2001–02	Segunda División B	36	0	—		—		—		36	0
Espanyol B	2002–03	Segunda División B	29	0	—		—		—		29	0
Espanyol B	2003–04	Segunda División B	30	0	—		—		—		30	0
Espanyol B	Total		59	0	—		—		—		59	0
Espanyol	2002–03	La Liga	0	0	0	0	—		—		0	0
Espanyol	2003–04	La Liga	0	0	0	0	—		—		0	0
Espanyol	2005–06	La Liga	21	0	5	0	6 (Note: Appearances in UEFA Cup)	0	—		32	0
Espanyol	2006–07	La Liga	2	0	2	0	15	0	1 (Note: Includes appearance in Supercopa de España)	0	20	0
Espanyol	Total		23	0	7	0	21	0	1	0	52	0
Eibar (loan)	2004–05	Segunda División	41	0	0	0	0	0	—		41	0
Athletic Bilbao	2007–08	La Liga	13	0	1	0	—		—		14	0
Athletic Bilbao	2008–09	La Liga	36	0	9	0	—		—		45	0
Athletic Bilbao	2009–10	La Liga	37	0	1	0	12 (Note: Appearances in UEFA Europa League)	0	1	0	51	0
Athletic Bilbao	2010–11	La Liga	37	0	4	0	—		—		41	0
Athletic Bilbao	2011–12	La Liga	37	0	9	0	15	0	—		61	0
Athletic Bilbao	2012–13	La Liga	35	0	—		7	0	—		42	0
Athletic Bilbao	2013–14	La Liga	33	0	—		—		—		33	0
Athletic Bilbao	2014–15	La Liga	34	0	1	0	8 (Note: Appearances in UEFA Champions League)	0	—		43	0
Athletic Bilbao	2015–16	La Liga	37	0	—		—		2	0	39	0
Athletic Bilbao	2016–17	La Liga	16	0	4	0	3	0	—		23	0
Athletic Bilbao	Total		315	0	29	0	45	0	3	0	392	0
Girona	2017–18	La Liga	9	0	1	0	—		—		10	0
Girona	2018–19	La Liga	7	0	6	0	—		—		13	0
Girona	Total		16	0	7	0	—		—		23	0
Career total			504	0	43	0	66	0	4	0	617	0

== Honours ==
Espanyol

- Copa del Rey: 2005–06
- UEFA Cup runner-up: 2006–07

Athletic Bilbao

- Supercopa de España: 2015
- UEFA Europa League runner-up: 2011–12
- Copa del Rey runner-up: 2008–09, 2011–12, 2014–15
