= 2005–06 RCD Espanyol season =

RCD Espanyol
2005–06 season
- President: Daniel Sánchez Llibre
- Head coach: Miguel Ángel Lotina
- Stadium: Estadi Olímpic Lluís Companys
- La Liga: 15th
- Copa del Rey: Winners
- UEFA Cup: Round of 32

The 2005–06 RCD Espanyol season was RCD Espanyol's 12th consecutive season in top-division of the Spanish football league, the La Liga, and the 106th as a football club.

== Pre-season and friendlies ==
Win Draw Loss

| 17 July 2005 Nanjing International Tournament 1/2 final | Feyenoord (Netherlands) | 2–1 | (Spain) Espanyol | Nanjing, China |
| | Kuyt 9', 19' | | Pochettino 32' | Stadium: Nanjing Olympic Sports Centre |

== Competitions ==
=== Overall record ===
| Competition | First match | Last match | Starting round | Final position | Record | | | | | | | |
| Competition | First match | Last match | Starting round | Final position | Pld | W | D | L | GF | GA | GD | Win % |
|---|---|---|---|---|---|---|---|---|---|---|---|---|
| La Liga | 28 August 2005 | 13 May 2006 | Matchday 1 | 15th | 38 | 10 | 11 | 17 | 36 | 56 | −20 | 26.32 |
| Copa del Rey | 4 January 2006 | 12 April 2006 | Round of 16 | Winners | 7 | 5 | 2 | 0 | 14 | 5 | +9 | 71.43 |
| UEFA Cup | 15 September 2005 | 23 February 2006 | First round | Round of 32 | 8 | 3 | 3 | 2 | 8 | 8 | +0 | 37.50 |
| Total | | | | | 53 | 18 | 16 | 19 | 58 | 69 | −11 | 33.96 |

Source: Competitions

=== La Liga ===
==== League table ====
| Pos | Team | Pld | W | D | L | GF | GA | GD | Pts | Qualification or relegation |
|---|---|---|---|---|---|---|---|---|---|---|
| 13 | Mallorca | 38 | 10 | 13 | 15 | 37 | 51 | −14 | 43 | |
| 14 | Real Betis | 38 | 10 | 12 | 16 | 34 | 51 | −17 | 42 | |
| 15 | Espanyol | 38 | 10 | 11 | 17 | 36 | 56 | −20 | 41 | Qualification for the UEFA Cup first round (Note: Espanyol qualified for the UEFA Cup first round as the 2005–06 Copa del Rey winners.) |
| 16 | Real Sociedad | 38 | 11 | 7 | 20 | 48 | 65 | −17 | 40 | |
| 17 | Racing Santander | 38 | 9 | 13 | 16 | 36 | 49 | −13 | 40 | |

Source: LFP
Rules for classification: 1st points; 2nd head-to-head points; 3rd head-to-head goal difference; 4th head-to-head goals scored; 5th goal difference; 6th number of goals scored; 7th Fair-play points

==== Results summary ====
| Overall | | | | | | | | Home | | | | | | Away | | | | | |
| Pld | W | D | L | GF | GA | GD | Pts | W | D | L | GF | GA | GD | W | D | L | GF | GA | GD |
|---|---|---|---|---|---|---|---|---|---|---|---|---|---|---|---|---|---|---|---|
| 38 | 10 | 11 | 17 | 36 | 56 | −20 | 41 | 7 | 4 | 8 | 26 | 24 | +2 | 3 | 7 | 9 | 10 | 32 | −22 |

Source: La Liga

==== Results by round ====
| Round | 1 |
|---|---|
| Ground | |
| Result | |
| Position | |

Source: La Liga
A = Away; H = Home; W = Win; D = Draw; L = Loss

==== Matches ====
| 28 August 2005 1 | Espanyol | 0–2 | Getafe | Barcelona |

| 11 September 2005 2 | Málaga | 1–2 | Espanyol | Málaga |

| 18 September 2005 3 | Espanyol | 1–0 | Real Madrid | Barcelona |

| 21 September 2005 4 | Racing Santander | 1–0 | Espanyol | Santander |

| 24 September 2005 5 | Espanyol | 1–2 | Villarreal | Barcelona |

| 2 October 2005 6 | Sevilla | 1–1 | Espanyol | Seville |

| 16 October 2005 7 | Espanyol | 0–2 | Cádiz | Barcelona |

| 23 October 2005 8 | Celta Vigo | 1–0 | Espanyol | Vigo |

| 27 October 2005 11 | Alavés | 1–1 | Espanyol | Vitoria-Gasteiz |

| 30 October 2005 9 | Osasuna | 2–0 | Espanyol | Pamplona |

| 5 November 2005 10 | Espanyol | 1–1 | Athletic Bilbao | Barcelona |

| 20 November 2005 12 | Espanyol | 2–0 | Mallorca | Barcelona |

| 27 November 2005 13 | Atlético Madrid | 1–1 | Espanyol | Madrid |

| 4 December 2005 14 | Espanyol | 1–3 | Valencia | Barcelona |

| 11 December 2005 15 | Real Betis | 0–0 | Espanyol | Seville |

| 18 December 2005 16 | Espanyol | 2–2 | Zaragoza | Barcelona |

| 21 December 2005 17 | Deportivo La Coruña | 1–2 | Espanyol | A Coruña |

| 7 January 2006 18 | Espanyol | 1–2 | Barcelona | Barcelona |

| 15 January 2006 19 | Real Sociedad | 0–1 | Espanyol | San Sebastián |

| 22 January 2006 20 | Getafe | 5–0 | Espanyol | Getafe |

| 29 January 2006 21 | Espanyol | 3–1 | Málaga | Barcelona |

| 4 February 2006 22 | Real Madrid | 4–0 | Espanyol | Madrid |

| 12 February 2006 23 | Espanyol | 0–2 | Racing Santander | Barcelona |

| 18 February 2006 24 | Villarreal | 4–0 | Espanyol | Villarreal |

| 26 February 2006 25 | Espanyol | 5–0 | Sevilla | Barcelona |

| 4 March 2006 26 | Cádiz | 2–0 | Espanyol | Cádiz |

| 11 March 2006 27 | Espanyol | 2–0 | Celta Vigo | Barcelona |

| 19 March 2006 28 | Espanyol | 2–4 | Osasuna | Barcelona |

| 22 March 2006 29 | Athletic Bilbao | 1–1 | Espanyol | Bilbao |

| 26 March 2006 30 | Espanyol | 0–0 | Alavés | Barcelona |

| 2 April 2006 31 | Mallorca | 0–0 | Espanyol | Palma |

| 9 April 2006 32 | Espanyol | 1–1 | Atlético Madrid | Barcelona |

| 16 April 2006 33 | Valencia | 4–0 | Espanyol | Valencia |

| 23 April 2006 34 | Espanyol | 2–0 | Real Betis | Barcelona |

| 30 April 2006 35 | Zaragoza | 1–1 | Espanyol | Zaragoza |

| 3 May 2006 36 | Espanyol | 1–2 | Deportivo La Coruña | Barcelona |

| 6 May 2006 37 | Barcelona | 2–0 | Espanyol | Barcelona |

| 13 May 2006 38 | Espanyol | 1–0 | Real Sociedad | Barcelona |

=== Copa del Rey ===
==== Round of 16 ====
| 4 January 2006 First leg | Getafe | 0–1 | Espanyol | Getafe |

| 11 January 2006 Second leg | Espanyol | 3–3 (4–3 agg.) | Getafe | Barcelona |
| | | | | Stadium: Estadi Olímpic Lluís Companys |

==== Quarter-finals ====
| 18 January 2006 First leg | Cádiz | 0–2 | Espanyol | Getafe |

| 25 January 2006 Second leg | Espanyol | 2–0 (4–0 agg.) | Cádiz | Barcelona |
| | | | | Stadium: Estadi Olímpic Lluís Companys |

==== Semi-finals ====
| 9 February 2006 First leg | Espanyol | 2–1 | Deportivo La Coruña | Barcelona |
| | | | | Stadium: Estadi Olímpic Lluís Companys |

| 15 March 2006 Second leg | Deportivo La Coruña | 0–0 (1–2 agg.) | Espanyol | A Coruña |

==== Final ====
| 12 April 2006 Final | Espanyol | 4–1 | Zaragoza | Madrid |
| | Tamudo 2'; García 33', 86'; Coro 71' | | Ewerthon 28' | Stadium: Santiago Bernabéu; Attendance: 78,000; Referee: Luis Medina Cantalejo |

=== UEFA Cup ===
==== First round ====
| 15 September 2005 First leg | Teplice (Czech Republic) | 1–1 | (Spain) Espanyol | Teplice, Czech Republic |
| 18:30 | | | | Stadium: Na Stínadlech; Attendance: 16,000 |

| 29 September 2005 Second leg | Espanyol (Spain) | 2–0 (3–1 agg.) | (Czech Republic) Teplice | Barcelona, Spain |
| 21:45 | | | | Stadium: Estadi Olímpic Lluís Companys; Attendance: 9,435 |

==== Group stage ====
| Pos | Team | Pld | W | D | L | GF | GA | GD | Pts | Qualification | PAL | ESP | LOK | BRØ | MPT |
|---|---|---|---|---|---|---|---|---|---|---|---|---|---|---|---|
| 1 | (Italy) Palermo | 4 | 2 | 2 | 0 | 6 | 2 | +4 | 8 | Advance to knockout stage | — | — | 0–0 | 3–0 | — |
| 2 | (Spain) Espanyol | 4 | 2 | 2 | 0 | 4 | 2 | +2 | 8 | Advance to knockout stage | 1–1 | — | — | — | 1–0 |
| 3 | (Russia) Lokomotiv Moscow | 4 | 2 | 1 | 1 | 8 | 3 | +5 | 7 | Advance to knockout stage | — | 0–1 | — | 4–2 | — |
| 4 | (Denmark) Brøndby | 4 | 1 | 1 | 2 | 5 | 8 | −3 | 4 | | — | 1–1 | — | — | 2–0 |
| 5 | (Israel) Maccabi Petah Tikva | 4 | 0 | 0 | 4 | 1 | 9 | −8 | 0 | | 1–2 | — | 0–4 | — | — |

| 19 October 2005 1 | Lokomotiv Moscow (Russia) | 0–1 | (Spain) Espanyol | Moscow, Russia |
| | | | | Stadium: Lokomotiv Stadium |

| 24 November 2005 2 | Espanyol (Spain) | 1–1 | (Italy) Palermo | Barcelona, Spain |
| | | | | Stadium: Estadi Olímpic Lluís Companys |

| 30 November 2005 3 | Brøndby (Denmark) | 1–1 | (Spain) Espanyol | Brøndby, Denmark |
| | | | | Stadium: Brøndby Stadium |

| 15 December 2005 4 | Espanyol (Spain) | 1–0 | (Israel) Maccabi Petah Tikva | Barcelona, Spain |
| | | | | Stadium: Estadi Olímpic Lluís Companys |

==== Knockout stage ====
===== Round of 32 =====
| 15 February 2006 First leg | Schalke 04 (Germany) | 2–1 | (Spain) Espanyol | Gelsenkirchen, Germany |
| 20:00 | Bordon 67'; Ernst 88' | | García 34' | Stadium: Veltins-Arena; Attendance: 53,642; Referee: Roberto Rosetti (Italy) |

| 23 February 2006 Second leg | Espanyol (Spain) | 0–3 (1–5 agg.) | (Germany) Schalke 04 | Barcelona, Spain |
| 21:45 | | | Kurányi 54'; Sand 70'; Lincoln 73' | Stadium: Estadi Olímpic Lluís Companys; Attendance: 18,100; Referee: Tom Henning Øvrebø (Norway) |
