= Erwin Lemmens =

Belgian footballer (born 1976)

Personal information
- Date of birth: 12 May 1976 (age 50)
- Place of birth: Berchem, Antwerp, Belgium
- Height: 1.84 m (6 ft 0 in)
- Position: Goalkeeper

Senior career*
| Years | Team | Apps | (Gls) |
| 1995–1999 | Beveren | 53 | (0) |
| 1999–2003 | Racing Santander | 82 | (0) |
| 2003–2005 | Espanyol | 29 | (0) |
| 2005–2006 | Olympiacos | 0 | (0) |
| 2007 | RKC | 10 | (0) |
| 2007–2008 | Dender | 14 | (0) |
| 2009–2010 | Beveren | 32 | (0) |
| Total | | 220 | (0) |

International career
| 2004 | Belgium | 2 | (0) |

Managerial career
- 2010–2015: Lokeren (goalkeeping coach)
- 2013–: Belgium (goalkeeping coach)
- 2015–2017: Genk (goalkeeping coach)
- 2017–2018: Lokeren (goalkeeping coach)
- * Club domestic league appearances and goals

Erwin Lemmens (born 12 May 1976) is a Belgian retired professional footballer who played as a goalkeeper, and is the goalkeeper coach of the Belgium national team.

Lemmens won two caps for Belgium, both in 2004.

On 24 January 2013, Lemmens was named the goalkeeping coach of the Red Devils.

== Club career ==
Born in Brussels, Lemmens started his career at K.S.K. Beveren in 1995, and was a regular in his last two years after which he signed for Racing de Santander in Spain. After four seasons and 49 La Liga matches for the Cantabrians (adding 33 appearances in a 2002 promotion) he joined RCD Espanyol also in the country, being first-choice during the 2003–04 campaign.

The arrival of Cameroon international Carlos Kameni the following season meant Lemmens was confined to bench duty, with just one Copa del Rey match to his tally. Subsequently, he signed with Olympiacos F.C. in the summer of 2005, competing with young Kleopas Giannou for the substitute role behind regular Antonios Nikopolidis.

Lemmens did not manage to play one single game with the Greek side, being demoted to third-choice in 2006–07 upon the signing of Tomislav Butina. On 31 January 2007, he was finally released by the club, quickly joining Dutch club RKC Waalwijk on a free transfer; on 10 February he played his first Eredivisie game, against Heracles Almelo.

Lemmens moved to newly promoted F. C. Verbroedering Dender E.H. for 2007–08, and won the competition for first-choice with former R.S.C. Anderlecht's Jan Van Steenberghe. After a hip injury, however, his season came to an end.

After one year out of football, 33-year-old Lemmens signed with first professional club Beveren, now in the second division. He helped the team finish comfortably in mid-table, but they would be relegated due to financial irregularities and he retired shortly after, going on to work as a goalkeeper coach with K.S.C. Lokeren Oost-Vlaanderen and K.R.C. Genk.

== International career ==
Courtesy of his early solid performances for Espanyol, Lemmens won two caps for Belgium, both in 2004. His debut came on 31 March, as he featured 32 minutes in a 3–0 friendly loss in Germany.

On 24 January 2013, Lemmens was named the new goalkeeping coach of the Red Devils, replacing the departed Philippe Vande Walle.

== Career statistics ==
Appearances and goals by club, season and competition
| Club | Season | League | | | National cup | | Europe | | Other | | Total | |
| Club | Season | Division | Apps | Goals | Apps | Goals | Apps | Goals | Apps | Goals | Apps | Goals |
|---|---|---|---|---|---|---|---|---|---|---|---|---|
| Beveren | 1995–96 | Belgian First Division | 2 | 0 | 0 | 0 | — | | — | | 2 | 0 |
| Beveren | 1996–97 | Belgian Second Division | 1 | 0 | 0 | 0 | — | | — | | 1 | 0 |
| Beveren | 1997–98 | Belgian First Division | 18 | 0 | 0 | 0 | — | | 1 | 0 | 19 | 0 |
| Beveren | 1998–99 | Belgian First Division | 32 | 0 | 1 | 0 | — | | 1 | 0 | 34 | 0 |
| Beveren | Total | | 53 | 0 | 1 | 0 | — | | 1 | 0 | 55 | 0 |
| Racing Santander | 1999–2000 | La Liga | 17 | 0 | 3 | 0 | — | | — | | 13 | 0 |
| Racing Santander | 2000–01 | La Liga | 5 | 0 | 3 | 0 | — | | — | | 33 | 0 |
| Racing Santander | 2001–02 | Segunda División | 33 | 0 | 1 | 0 | — | | — | | 40 | 0 |
| Racing Santander | 2002–03 | La Liga | 27 | 0 | 0 | 0 | — | | — | | 36 | 0 |
| Racing Santander | Total | | 82 | 0 | 7 | 0 | — | | — | | 89 | 0 |
| Espanyol | 2003–04 | La Liga | 29 | 0 | 1 | 0 | — | | — | | 30 | 0 |
| Espanyol | 2004–05 | La Liga | 0 | 0 | 0 | 0 | — | | — | | 0 | 0 |
| Espanyol | Total | | 29 | 0 | 1 | 0 | — | | — | | 30 | 0 |
| Olympiacos | 2005–06 | Alpha Ethniki | 0 | 0 | 0 | 0 | 0 | 0 | — | | 0 | 0 |
| RKC | 2006–07 | Eredivisie | 10 | 0 | 1 | 0 | — | | 6 | 0 | 17 | 0 |
| Dender | 2007–08 | Belgian First Division | 14 | 0 | 1 | 0 | — | | — | | 15 | 0 |
| Beveren | 2009–10 | Belgian Second Division | 32 | 0 | 2 | 0 | — | | — | | 34 | 0 |
| Career total | | | 220 | 0 | 13 | 0 | 0 | 0 | 8 | 0 | 241 | 0 |
