= Maxi Rodríguez =

Argentine footballer (born 1981)

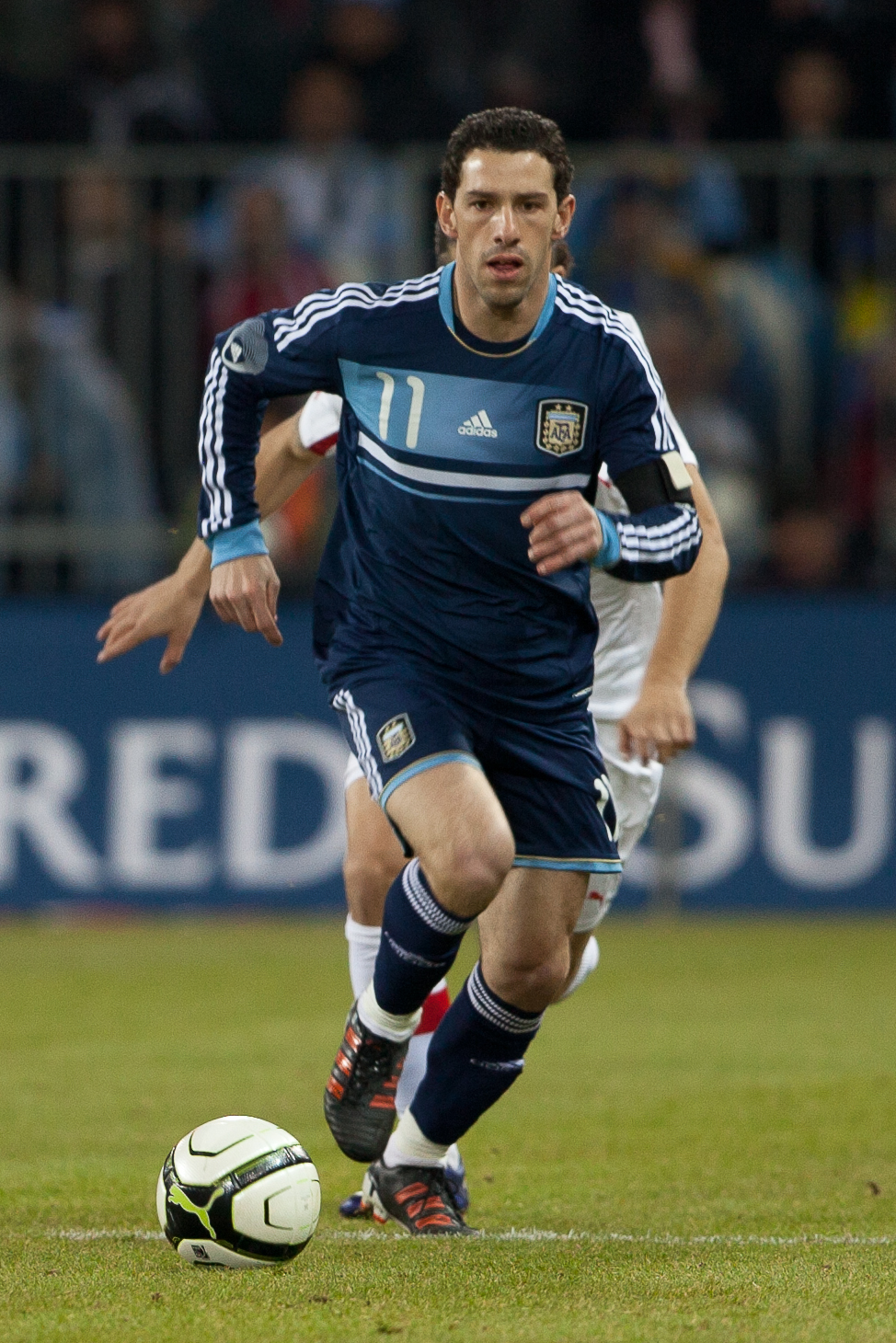
- Rodríguez with Argentina in 2012

Personal information
- Full name: Maximiliano Rubén Rodríguez
- Date of birth: 2 January 1981 (age 45)
- Place of birth: Rosario, Argentina
- Height: 1.80 m (5 ft 11 in)
- Positions: Winger; attacking midfielder

Youth career
- 1987–1999: Newell's Old Boys

Senior career*
Years	Team	Apps	(Gls)
1999–2002	Newell's Old Boys	57	(20)
2002–2005	Espanyol	111	(26)
2005–2010	Atlético Madrid	121	(32)
2010–2012	Liverpool	57	(15)
2012–2017	Newell's Old Boys	138	(48)
2017–2018	Peñarol	39	(12)
2019–2021	Newell's Old Boys	33	(9)
Total		556	(162)

International career
2001	Argentina U20	7	(4)
2003–2014	Argentina	57	(16)
Medal record
Men's football
Representing Argentina
FIFA World Cup
Runner-up	2014 Brazil
FIFA Confederations Cup
Runner-up	2005 Germany
- * Club domestic league appearances and goals

Maximiliano Rubén Rodríguez (Spanish pronunciation: [ˈmaksi roˈðɾiɣes]; born 2 January 1981) is an Argentine former professional footballer. Nicknamed La Fiera (The Beast in English), he was commonly used as a winger on both flanks but could also operate as an attacking midfielder.

He arrived in Spain aged 21, and went on to spend the bulk of his career there, appearing for Espanyol and Atlético Madrid and amassing La Liga totals of 232 matches and 58 goals over eight seasons. He also played two years with Liverpool in England, and began and ended his career at Newell's Old Boys.

An Argentina international for 11 years, Rodríguez represented the country in three World Cups, finishing second in 2014 and earning 57 caps.

== Club career ==
=== Newell's and Espanyol ===
Born in Rosario, Santa Fe Province, Rodríguez came through the youth set-up at Newell's Old Boys in the Primera División. He played with the club for three seasons, before moving to Spain.

In March 2002, Rodríguez agreed to a four-year deal with the option of a fifth at RCD Espanyol in La Liga. The transfer was frozen in May – after the player's presentation – by a court in Argentina who alleged irregularities in the actions of Newell's president Eduardo López; on 26 June the deal was concluded, for a €5 million fee in three instalments and with a buyout clause of €24 million. He made his debut on 2 September by featuring the full 90 minutes in a 2–0 loss away to Real Madrid, and scored his first goal on 27 October to decide a 4–3 comeback at Málaga CF in his team's first away victory for over a year.

Rodríguez played 37 matches in every campaign with the Catalans, scoring 15 goals during his last to finish joint seventh for the Pichichi Trophy. He opened his account for that season with a hat-trick in the second game, a 4–1 away win over Real Betis on 12 September, and followed it six days later with the only goal of a defeat of Real Madrid at the Estadi Olímpic Lluís Companys. He also scored both goals of a win away to Real Sociedad on 7 November, while in the next fixture his penalty kick won the game against Racing de Santander and briefly put his side on top of the league ahead of city rivals FC Barcelona, though he was also sent off.

=== Atlético Madrid ===
At the start of the 2005–06 season, Rodríguez moved to Atlético Madrid for a transfer fee of €5 million, where he continued to post consistent numbers. In his second year he suffered, alongside teammate (and winger) Martin Petrov, a serious knee injury (anterior cruciate ligament), which limited him to only ten appearances.

On 10 November 2009, Rodríguez put four goals past UD Marbella in the Copa del Rey round-of-32 second leg, in an eventual 6–0 home win (8–0 aggregate). After the 2007 departure of Fernando Torres to Liverpool, he was selected as the new club captain; he took no part in the Colchoneros' 2009–10 UEFA Europa League campaign, which ended in conquest.

=== Liverpool ===
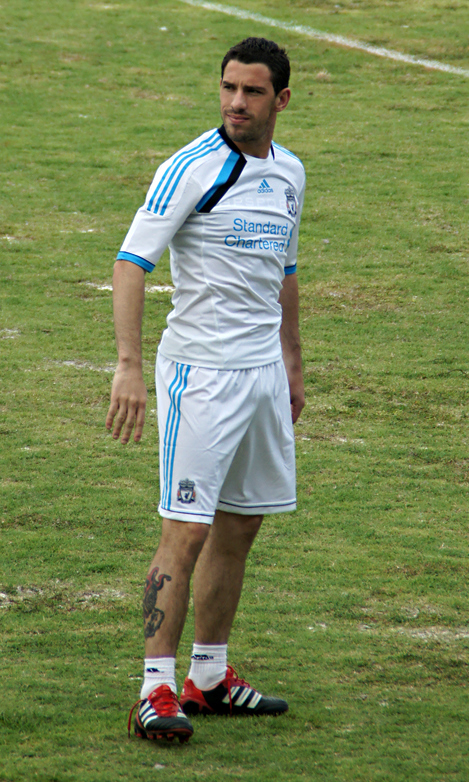
Rodríguez training with Liverpool in 2011

On 13 January 2010, Rodríguez completed a free transfer to Liverpool, signing a three-and-a-half-year deal; after securing his signature, Rafael Benítez described him as "comfortable on the ball, can pass and keep possession. He is good at getting into the box and scoring goals and a good finisher", and the player was given the number 17 shirt, making his debut for the club as a second-half substitute in a Premier League match against Stoke City on the 16th. His first full start came a week and a half later, in a 0–0 away draw to Wolverhampton Wanderers.

Rodríguez picked up two league assists in his first games, both of which were for former Atlético teammate Torres. He scored his first competitive goal in a 4–0 win over Burnley at Turf Moor on 25 April 2010, playing the full 90 minutes.

2010–11 was a good individual season for Rodríguez, who netted ten league goals for the team, including hat-tricks against Birmingham City (5–0 home victory) and Fulham (5–2 at Craven Cottage). In the latter match, he scored twice in the opening seven minutes – the first being just after 32 seconds – and completed his exhibition with a 25-yard strike.

On 8 July 2011, Rodríguez switched his jersey number to 11, and he scored two goals in a pre-season friendly with Malaysia shortly after, which finished with a 6–3 win. On 24 August, he was given his first start of the season in a League Cup tie against Exeter City, and netted the second in an eventual 3–1 away victory.

On 20 November 2011, Rodríguez scored against Chelsea following a build-up with teammate Craig Bellamy, with Liverpool winning it 2–1 at Stamford Bridge. Nine days later, against the same opponent, in the same venue and again with the decisive pass being made by the Welshman, he found the net in a 2–0 League Cup win, and his team went on to win the latter competition.

On 26 December 2011, Rodríguez scored just his second league goal of the season in a 1–1 draw at Anfield against Blackburn Rovers. He netted his last two on 10 April 2012, for a 3–2 away defeat of the same adversary.

=== Return to South America ===
On 13 July 2012, after 73 official games and 17 goals scored, Rodríguez left Liverpool and returned to his first professional club Newell's Old Boys. He wrote an open letter to the Reds fans before his departure, thanking them for their support in his two-and-a-half-year stint.

Rodríguez played his first match for the club since leaving on 5 August 2012, in a 0–0 draw against Club Atlético Independiente. According to him, football in his country was now "worse than ten years ago". In June 2013, he helped the team win the Torneo Final, being awarded the Alumni by directors and former directors of Argentinian football late in the year.

In July 2017, the 36-year-old Rodríguez moved to Uruguayan club Peñarol. After winning the league in both of his seasons in Montevideo, he returned to Newell's on an 18-month contract in the last days of 2018.

On 27 November 2021, Rodríguez confirmed his retirement at the age of 40, having been substituted to a standing ovation at home to Club Atlético Banfield in his final match. The following January, however, he joined Hughes Foot Ball Club in the Liga Venadense de Fútbol (a regional football league in Santa Fe Province) along with his childhood friend and Newell's teammate Ignacio Scocco, president of said club.

Rodríguez was given a farewell match at the Estadio Marcelo Bielsa on 24 June 2023, which pitted historic players of Newell's Old Boys against their counterparts of the Argentina national team, such as captain Lionel Messi who was celebrating his 36th birthday. He scored for both sides as the latter won 7–5, and both his daughters, Alma and Aitana, did the same once each in the second half.

== International career ==
Rodríguez won the 2001 FIFA World Youth Championship with the Argentine under-20s on home soil, scoring four goals in seven matches including the first and last one in the final for the champions. He made his full side debut in a friendly against Japan on 8 June 2003, coming on as a 75th-minute substitute for Santiago Solari and scoring to conclude a 4–1 win in Osaka.

After being part of the 2005 FIFA Confederations Cup squad, Rodríguez was called for the 2006 FIFA World Cup by national boss José Pékerman and, on 16 June, he scored twice in Argentina's 6–0 victory over Serbia and Montenegro in the group stage. In the round of 16, he scored the winning goal against Mexico in a 2–1 extra time victory: he controlled a cross-field pass from Juan Pablo Sorín with his chest before volleying it into the top corner of Oswaldo Sánchez's net from outside the penalty area with his left foot, in the 98th minute; in an unofficial online poll by FIFA, it was voted the best goal of the tournament.

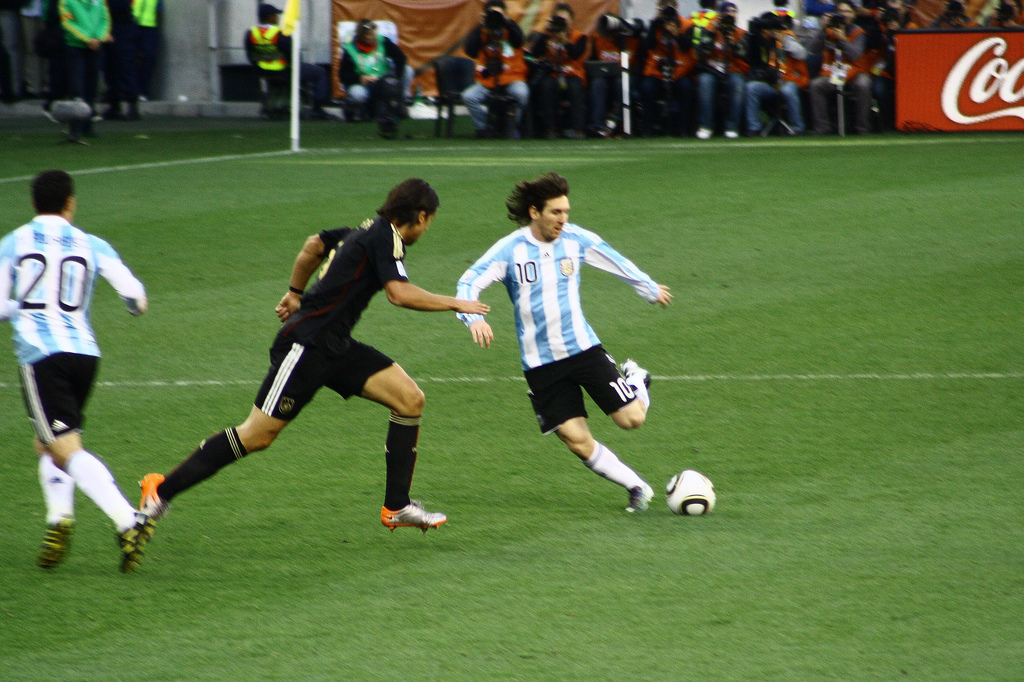
Rodríguez (furthest left) in action against Germany at the 2010 World Cup

After Argentina lost the quarter-final game against Germany on 30 June 2006, Rodríguez punched opponent Bastian Schweinsteiger in the back. FIFA fined him CHF5,000 and suspended him from two matches in the 2007 Copa América for violent conduct. However, after a serious knee injury in a friendly with Spain in October 2006, he missed the continental competition as national team manager Alfio Basile, whom initially intended to select the player, eventually rested him for precaution.

Rodríguez scored in Diego Maradona's first game in charge of Argentina, a 1–0 friendly win in Scotland. On 19 May 2010 he was named in the squad of 23 for the 2010 World Cup in South Africa and, in the last home game before the finals five days later, scored twice against Canada, from a free kick from a sharp angle and after receiving a pass from Carlos Tevez in an eventual 5–0 rout.

In June 2014, Rodríguez made Argentina's list for the 2014 World Cup. He started in his side's opening game, a 2–1 defeat of Bosnia and Herzegovina at the Estádio do Maracanã, playing the first half before being substituted for Gonzalo Higuaín at half-time. He was only fielded again in the semi-finals against the Netherlands, converting the decisive penalty shootout attempt (0–0 after 120 minutes) to send his country to the final for the first time in 24 years.

== Personal life ==
Rodríguez was raised by his mother Claudia in his grandparents' home and never met his father. He is the cousin of fellow footballers Alexis Rodríguez and Denis Rodríguez, and all three played for Newell's at the same time.

== Other ventures ==
In 2009, Rodríguez appeared in a music video for Coti, starring alongside Atlético teammate Diego Forlán.

== Career statistics ==
=== Club ===
Appearances and goals by club, season and competition
Club	Season	League			National cup (Note: Includes Copa del Rey, FA Cup, Copa Argentina)		League cup (Note: Includes Football League Cup, Copa de la Superliga)		Continental		Total	
Club	Season	Division	Apps	Goals	Apps	Goals	Apps	Goals	Apps	Goals	Apps	Goals
Newell's Old Boys	1999–2000	Argentine Primera División	6	0	–		–		–		6	0
Newell's Old Boys	2000–01	Argentine Primera División	18	5	–		–		–		18	5
Newell's Old Boys	2001–02	Argentine Primera División	33	15	–		–		–		33	15
Newell's Old Boys	Total		57	20	–		–		–		57	20
Espanyol	2002–03	La Liga	37	7	0	0	–		–		37	7
Espanyol	2003–04	La Liga	37	4	0	0	–		–		37	4
Espanyol	2004–05	La Liga	37	15	0	0	–		–		37	15
Espanyol	Total		111	26	0	0	–		–		111	26
Atlético Madrid	2005–06	La Liga	29	10	2	0	–		–		31	10
Atlético Madrid	2006–07	La Liga	10	6	0	0	–		–		10	6
Atlético Madrid	2007–08	La Liga	35	8	3	0	–		10 (Note: Appearances in UEFA Cup)	2	48	10
Atlético Madrid	2008–09	La Liga	33	6	2	0	–		8 (Note: Appearances in UEFA Champions League)	4	43	10
Atlético Madrid	2009–10	La Liga	14	2	2	5	–		8	1	24	8
Atlético Madrid	Total		121	32	9	5	–		26	7	156	44
Liverpool	2009–10	Premier League	17	1	–		–		–		17	1
Liverpool	2010–11	Premier League	28	10	1	0	0	0	6	0	35	10
Liverpool	2011–12	Premier League	12	4	5	0	4	2	0	0	21	6
Liverpool	Total		57	15	6	0	4	2	6	0	73	17
Newell's Old Boys	2012–13	Argentine Primera División	28	5	1	0	–		11 (Note: Appearances in Copa Libertadores)	3	40	8
Newell's Old Boys	2013–14	Argentine Primera División	22	9	1	0	–		5	2	28	11
Newell's Old Boys	2014	Argentine Primera División	17	11	1	0	–		–		18	11
Newell's Old Boys	2015	Argentine Primera División	29	10	0	0	–		–		29	10
Newell's Old Boys	2016	Argentine Primera División	16	4	1	3	–		–		17	7
Newell's Old Boys	2016–17	Argentine Primera División	26	9	1	0	–		–		27	9
Newell's Old Boys	Total		138	48	5	3	–		16	5	159	56
Peñarol	2017	Uruguayan Primera División	15	6	–		–		–		15	6
Peñarol	2018	Uruguayan Primera División	24	6	5	3	–		5 (Note: Four appearances in Copa Libertadores, one appearance in Copa Sudamericana)	0	34	9
Peñarol	Total		39	12	5	3	–		5	0	49	15
Newell's Old Boys	2018–19	Argentine Primera División	7	3	1	0	2	2	–		10	5
Newell's Old Boys	2019–20	Argentine Primera División	23	6	1	0	12	3	–		36	9
Newell's Old Boys	2020	Argentine Primera División	0	0	0	0	13	2	–		13	2
Newell's Old Boys	2021	Argentine Primera División	3	0	0	0	–		3 (Note: Appearances in Copa Sudamericana)	1	6	1
Newell's Old Boys	Total		33	9	2	0	27	7	3	1	65	17
Career total			556	162	29	13	31	9	56	13	670	195

=== International ===
Appearances and goals by years:

Year	Apps	Goals
2003	2	1
2004	2	0
2005	8	1
2006	7	4
2007	4	1
2008	5	2
2009	7	1
2010	6	2
2011	0	0
2012	4	0
2013	7	3
2014	5	1
Total	57	16

Argentina score listed first, score column indicates score after each Rodríguez goal. Sign ‡ indicates goals scored from a penalty kick.

#	Date	Venue	Opponent	Score	Result	Competition
–	29 December 2004	Camp Nou, Barcelona, Spain	Catalonia	2–0	3–0	Unofficial friendly
1.	8 June 2003	Nagai Stadium, Osaka, Japan	Japan	4–1	4–1	Friendly
2.	17 August 2005	Ferenc Puskás, Budapest, Hungary	Hungary	1–0	2–1	Friendly
3.	30 May 2006	Stadio Arechi, Salerno, Italy	Angola	1–0	2–0	Friendly
4.	16 June 2006	FIFA WM Stadion, Gelsenkirchen, Germany	Serbia and Montenegro	1–0	6–0	2006 FIFA World Cup
5.	16 June 2006	FIFA WM Stadion, Gelsenkirchen, Germany	Serbia and Montenegro	3–0	6–0	2006 FIFA World Cup
6.	24 June 2006	Zentralstadion, Leipzig, Germany	Mexico	2–1	2–1	2006 FIFA World Cup
7.	22 August 2007	Ullevaal, Oslo, Norway	Norway	1–2	1–2	Friendly
8.	4 June 2008	Qualcomm, San Diego, United States	Mexico	3–0	4–1	Friendly
9.	19 November 2008	Hampden Park, Glasgow, Scotland	Scotland	1–0	1–0	Friendly
10.	28 March 2009	El Monumental, Buenos Aires, Argentina	Venezuela	3–0	4–0	2010 World Cup qualification
11.	24 May 2010	El Monumental, Buenos Aires, Argentina	Canada	1–0	5–0	Friendly
12.	24 May 2010	El Monumental, Buenos Aires, Argentina	Canada	2–0	5–0	Friendly
13.	10 September 2013	Defensores del Chaco, Asunción, Paraguay	Paraguay	5–2 ‡	5–2	2014 World Cup qualification
14.	15 October 2013	Centenario, Montevideo, Uruguay	Uruguay	1–1	2–3	2014 World Cup qualification
15.	15 October 2013	Centenario, Montevideo, Uruguay	Uruguay	2–2	2–3	2014 World Cup qualification
16.	4 June 2014	El Monumental, Buenos Aires, Argentina	Trinidad and Tobago	3–0	3–0	Friendly

== Honours ==
Liverpool

- Football League Cup: 2011–12
- FA Cup runner-up: 2011–12

Newell's Old Boys

- Argentine Primera División: 2013 Final

Peñarol

- Uruguayan Primera División: 2017, 2018
- Supercopa Uruguaya: 2018

Argentina U20

- FIFA U-20 World Cup: 2001

Argentina

- FIFA World Cup runner-up: 2014
- FIFA Confederations Cup runner-up: 2005

Individual

- Copa del Rey top scorer: 2009–10
- Footballer of the Year of Argentina: 2013
- Argentine Primera División top scorer: 2014
