= Raúl Vates =

Spanish footballer

Personal information
- Full name: Raúl Vates Puig
- Date of birth: 28 February 1981 (age 45)
- Place of birth: Barcelona, Spain
- Height: 1.75 m (5 ft 9 in)
- Position: Midfielder

Youth career
- La Salle Bonanova
- Espanyol

Senior career*
Years	Team	Apps	(Gls)
1999–2002	Espanyol B	72	(3)
2001–2003	Espanyol	4	(0)
2002–2003	→ Lleida (loan)	32	(0)
2003	Los Palacios	8	(1)
2004	Barcelona C	2	(0)
2004	Barcelona B	10	(0)
2004–2005	Cornellà		
2005–2006	Prat		
2006–2007	Barbastro	32	(1)
2007–2009	Pobla Mafumet		
2009–2011	Sporting Mahonés	42	(1)
2011–2015	Alcanar		
2015–2016	Reddis	11	(1)
2016–2017	Alcanar		
2017–2019	El Catllar		
2019–2020	Riudoms		
- * Club domestic league appearances and goals

Raúl Vates Puig (born 28 February 1981) is a Spanish former footballer who played as a midfielder.
