= Toni Jiménez =

Spanish footballer (born 1970)

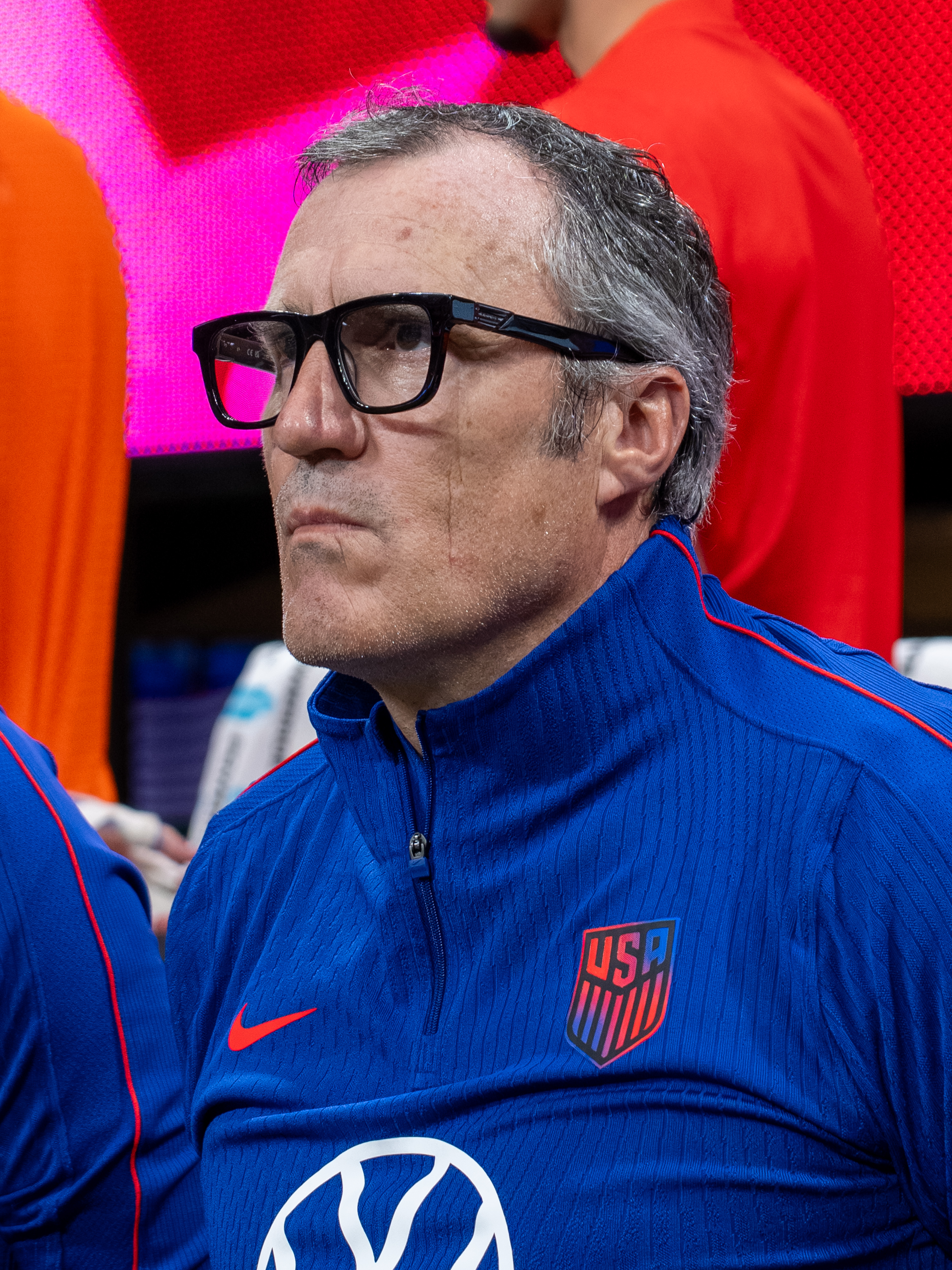
- Jiménez in 2026

Personal information
- Full name: Antonio Jiménez Sistachs
- Date of birth: 12 October 1970 (age 56)
- Place of birth: La Garriga, Spain
- Height: 1.86 m (6 ft 1 in)
- Position: Goalkeeper

Team information
- Current team: Manchester United (goalkeeping coach)

Youth career
- Olímpic Garriga
- Granollers

Senior career*
Years	Team	Apps	(Gls)
1988–1989	Granollers		
1989–1991	Barcelona C	16	(0)
1991–1992	Barcelona	0	(0)
1991–1992	→ Figueres (loan)	39	(0)
1992–1993	Rayo Vallecano	13	(0)
1993–1999	Espanyol	225	(0)
1999–2002	Atlético Madrid	43	(0)
2002–2003	Elche	18	(0)
2003–2004	Espanyol	29	(0)
Total		383	(0)

International career
1992	Spain U21	1	(0)
1992	Spain U23	8	(0)
1998–1999	Spain	3	(0)
- * Club domestic league appearances and goals

Olympic medal record

Representing Spain

Men's Football
Gold medal – first place	1992 Barcelona	Team competition

Antonio Jiménez Sistachs (Spanish pronunciation: [anˈtonjo xiˈmeneθ]; born 12 October 1970) is a Spanish former professional footballer who played as a goalkeeper. He is currently a goalkeeping coach of Premier League club Manchester United.

He appeared in 236 La Liga matches over nine seasons, seven of those spent with Espanyol. He also represented in the competition Rayo Vallecano and Atlético Madrid.

Jiménez helped Spain to win the gold medal at the 1992 Summer Olympics. He played three times with the full side later that decade.

== Club career ==
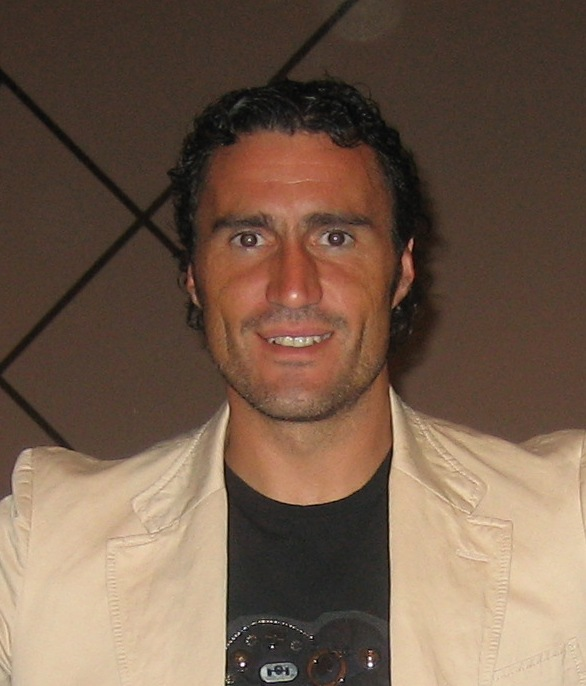
Jiménez in 2006

Born in La Garriga, Barcelona, Catalonia, Jiménez had a stint with local giants FC Barcelona's third team to kickstart his senior career. He made his professional debut with neighbours UE Figueres on loan, being backup then first choice over two Segunda División seasons.

In 1992, Jiménez moved to Rayo Vallecano after terminating his previous contract with Real Zaragoza. Initially a backup to Wilfred Agbonavbare, he benefitted from an injury to the Nigerian in the second round to make his La Liga debut against CD Logroñés, although he finished the campaign on the bench again.

The following year, Jiménez accompanied coach José Antonio Camacho to RCD Espanyol, then in the second tier. He was an undisputed starter during his six-year spell, winning the Ricardo Zamora Trophy in his first season, qualifying for the UEFA Cup immediately afterwards and making nearly 300 competitive appearances.

Jiménez signed for Atlético Madrid in summer 1999, being highly unsuccessful there. Barred by José Francisco Molina in his first year, the team from the capital were also relegated. Furthermore, in the final of the Copa del Rey against former side Espanyol, he was stripped off the ball by former teammate Raúl Tamudo's head for the final 2–1.

Jiménez regained first-choice status at Elche CF, but returned to the top flight and Espanyol in January 2003 when new boss Javier Clemente requested his signing. At the end of the following campaign, he retired from the game at the age of 33.

== International career ==
Jiménez had not yet played top-division football when he was selected by coach Vicente Miera to the 1992 Summer Olympics, in local Barcelona. He beat competition from Santiago Cañizares, until then the starter, and played all the matches and minutes en route to the gold medal.

Additionally, Jiménez won three caps for the full side in one year, his first one being offered by Camacho in a friendly with Italy on 18 November 1998 (2–2, in Salerno). He seemed poised to be called as third choice for UEFA Euro 2000, but 19-year-old Iker Casillas was chosen instead.

== Coaching career ==
Jiménez stayed connected with Espanyol in directorial capacities. He left in March 2006, when director of football Cristóbal Parralo also resigned.

Jiménez served his first coaching spell also in Catalonia, as assistant to Girona FC. He returned to the club as goalkeeper coach in May 2009 and, two years later, signed with Espanyol as Mauricio Pochettino's assistant; the pair linked up again in January 2013, when the latter was appointed at Southampton.

In late May 2014, both Pochettino and Jiménez signed for another team in the Premier League, Tottenham Hotspur. After two years in the French Ligue 1 with Paris Saint-Germain FC, they returned to the English top flight in May 2023 by joining Chelsea.

Jiménez reunited again with Pochettino in October 2024, following the latter's appointment at the United States national team the previous month.

== Career statistics ==
=== Club ===
Appearances and goals by club, season and competition
Club	Season	League			National cup		Europe		Other		Total	
Club	Season	Division	Apps	Goals	Apps	Goals	Apps	Goals	Apps	Goals	Apps	Goals
Figueres (loan)	1990–91	Segunda División	1	0	—		—		—		1	0
Figueres (loan)	1991–92	Segunda División	38	0	4	0	—		2	0	44	0
Figueres (loan)	Total		39	0	4	0	—		2	0	45	0
Rayo Vallecano	1992–93	La Liga	13	0	2	0	—		—		15	0
Espanyol	1993–94	Segunda División	38	0	1	0	—		—		39	0
Espanyol	1994–95	La Liga	38	0	0	0	—		—		38	0
Espanyol	1995–96	La Liga	40	0	0	0	—		—		40	0
Espanyol	1996–97	La Liga	34	0	1	0	4	0	—		39	0
Espanyol	1997–98	La Liga	37	0	0	0	—		—		37	0
Espanyol	1998–99	La Liga	38	0	4	0	0	0	—		42	0
Espanyol	Total		225	0	6	0	4	0	—		235	0
Atlético Madrid	1999–2000	La Liga	7	0	7	0	—		—		14	0
Atlético Madrid	2000–01	Segunda División	30	0	4	0	—		—		34	0
Atlético Madrid	2001–02	Segunda División	6	0	0	0	—		—		6	0
Atlético Madrid	Total		43	0	11	0	—		—		54	0
Elche	2002–03	Segunda División	18	0	0	0	—		—		18	0
Espanyol	2002–03	La Liga	20	0	—		—		—		20	0
Espanyol	2003–04	La Liga	9	0	1	0	—		—		10	0
Espanyol	Total		29	0	1	0	—		—		30	0
Career total			367	0	24	0	4	0	2	0	397	0

=== International ===
Appearances and goals by national team and year
National team	Year	Apps	Goals
Spain	1998	1	0
Spain	1999	2	0
Total		3	0

== Honours ==
Espanyol

- Segunda División: 1993–94

Atlético Madrid

- Copa del Rey runner-up: 1999–2000

Spain U23

- Summer Olympic Games: 1992

Individual

- Ricardo Zamora Trophy: 1993–94 (Segunda División), 1997–98
