= Ricardo Cavas =

Spanish footballer

Personal information
- Full name: Ricardo Cavas Merino
- Date of birth: 31 July 1974 (age 52)
- Place of birth: Cáceres, Spain
- Height: 1.79 m (5 ft 10 in)
- Positions: Left-back; centre-back

Team information
- Current team: CFI Alicante (sporting director)

Senior career*
Years	Team	Apps	(Gls)
1991–1993	Sariñena	61	(12)
1993–1994	Real Zaragoza B	29	(5)
1995–1996	Barbastro	50	(3)
1996–1997	Logroñés B	19	(1)
1996–2000	Logroñés	93	(1)
2000–2001	Badajoz	36	(0)
2001–2002	Espanyol	27	(1)
2003	Elche	18	(0)
2003–2006	Rayo Vallecano	77	(1)
2006–2009	Alicante	75	(1)
2009–2011	Novelda		
2011–2012	Orihuela	18	(0)
2012–2015	Novelda		
2015–2016	Torrevieja		
2016–2017	CFI Alicante		
Total		503	(25)
- * Club domestic league appearances and goals

Ricardo Cavas Merino (born 31 July 1974) is a Spanish former professional footballer who could play as a left-back or a centre-back. He played in La Liga for both Logroñés and Espanyol, making a total of 40 top flight appearances.

== Club career ==
Born in Cáceres, Extremadura, Cavas began his career in 1991 with Tercera División side Sariñena. In 1993, he moved to Real Zaragoza, although in a season and a half with the club he appeared only for the B team. He was part of the side that won promotion from the Tercera División in 1993–94, before moving on again to Barbastro halfway through the following season.

Cavas joined Logroñés in 1996, and during his first season played with the B team in Segunda División B as well as making his La Liga debut for the first team. Logroñés were relegated from the top flight at the end of the season, but Cavas continued to be an important part of the side for three years in the Segunda División before joining second-tier rivals Badajoz in 2000.

Cavas returned to La Liga in 2001 with Espanyol, and was a key part of the team during the 2001–02 season. He joined Elche in the Segunda División in January 2003, and moved on again to Rayo Vallecano in July of the same year. Rayo were relegated in his first season, but Cavas continued to play for the club in Segunda División B for the next two years, before leaving to join Alicante in 2006.

Cavas was a key player for Alicante as they enjoyed great success over the next two seasons. In 2006–07, they topped their group in Segunda División B, although they missed out on promotion after losing to Racing de Ferrol in the play-off final. The following year, they were runners-up in their group behind Girona, but nonetheless earned promotion back to the second tier after a fifty-year absence thanks to a play-off victory over Ponferradina.

Alicante were immediately relegated again in 2008–09, and Cavas left at the end of that season to return to the lower tiers of Spanish football, joining Novelda in the Tercera División. He made a brief return to Segunda División B with Orihuela during the 2011–12 season, before returning to Novelda the following year on a free transfer.

Cavas left Novelda for a second time in August 2015, and rounded out his career with a season each at Torrevieja in the Tercera División and CFI Alicante in the sixth tier Primera Regional. He ended his playing career in 2017, shortly before his 43rd birthday.

== Retirement ==
Cavas is currently the sporting director at CFI Alicante.

== Honours ==
Alicante

- Segunda División B: 2006–07
- Segunda División B: Runners-up (earning promotion) 2007–08
