= Mauro Navas =

Argentine retired footballer (born 1974)

Personal information
- Full name: Mauro Esteban Navas Dellepiani
- Date of birth: 20 October 1974 (age 52)
- Place of birth: Buenos Aires, Argentina
- Height: 1.76 m (5 ft 9 in)
- Position: Right-back

Team information
- Current team: Boca Juniors (youth coach)

Senior career*
Years	Team	Apps	(Gls)
1994–1995	Banfield	41	(0)
1996–1997	Racing Club	70	(0)
1997–1999	Udinese	33	(0)
1999–2003	Espanyol	93	(0)
2003	→ Boca Juniors (loan)	1	(0)
2003–2004	Leganés	26	(1)
2004–2005	Almagro	18	(0)
2006–2007	Temperley	32	(0)
2007–2008	Comunicaciones	17	(0)
Total		331	(1)

Managerial career
- 2008–2009: Chacarita Juniors (assistant)
- 2010: Chacarita Juniors
- 2011: Platense
- 2012: Boca Juniors (youth coach)
- 2014–2016: Boca Juniors (assistant)
- 2016–2018: Al-Wasl (assistant)
- 2019: Fénix
- 2020–: Boca Juniors (youth coach)
- * Club domestic league appearances and goals

Mauro Esteban Navas Dellepiani (born 20 October 1974) is an Argentine former footballer who played as a right back, and current youth coach at Boca Juniors.

His professional career was spent, other than in his country, where he played in various clubs and divisions, in Italy and Spain. In the latter nation, he played four years with Espanyol in La Liga.

== Club career ==
Navas was born in Buenos Aires. After appearing prominently in his country for Club Atlético Banfield and Racing Club de Avellaneda, he signed with Italian club Udinese Calcio.

During the next four seasons he played in Spain with RCD Espanyol, starting in his first year – which ended with the conquest of the Copa del Rey – and appearing regularly for the Barcelona-based side in the following campaigns. After a sole season in the same country with lowly CD Leganés, he returned to his homeland in 2004, continuing to play mainly in the lower leagues (he had a brief spell in the Primera División, with modest Club Almagro).

== Coaching career ==
In November 2008, Navas was appointed assistant coach of Ricardo Zielinski at Chacarita Juniors. He left the position in July 2009.

On 22 March 2010 Navas was appointed manager of Chacarita Juniors who had just dismissed Fernando Gamboa, fired after the 0–2 away defeat against Club Atlético Huracán. However, he lasted less than one month at the helm of the team, leaving on 19 April. At the end of December 2010, Navas was appointed manager of Platense. He was in charge for 11 games, before his contract was terminated by mutual consent.

In 2012, Navas was hired as a youth coach at his former club Boca Juniors.

At the end of August 2014, Navas returned to Boca Juniors as an assistant coach under manager Rodolfo Arruabarrena. In June 2016, Navas followed Arruabarrena to Al Wasl, once again functioning as his assistant.

On 11 June 2019, Navas was appointed manager of Fénix. After poor results, Navas was released on 16 October 2019. In 2020, he returned to Boca Juniors as a youth coach.
