= Moisés Hurtado =

Spanish footballer

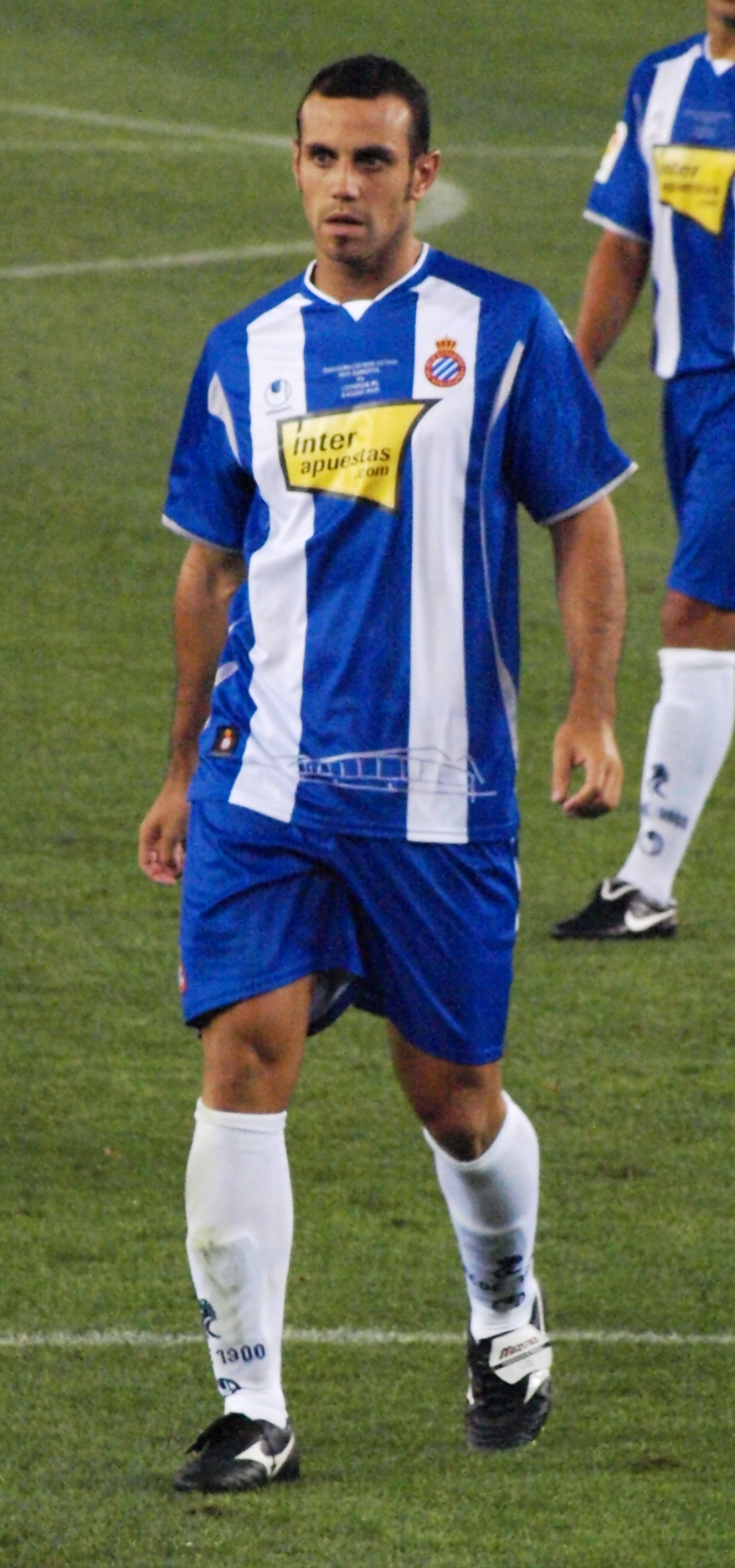
- Hurtado with Espanyol in 2009

Personal information
- Full name: Moisés Hurtado Pérez
- Date of birth: 20 February 1981 (age 45)
- Place of birth: Sabadell, Spain
- Height: 1.85 m (6 ft 1 in)
- Position: Defensive midfielder

Team information
- Current team: PAOK (assistant)

Youth career
- 1988–1991: Badia
- 1991–1996: Mercantil
- 1996–1999: Espanyol

Senior career*
Years	Team	Apps	(Gls)
1999–2004	Espanyol B	123	(5)
1999–2010	Espanyol	146	(3)
2004–2005	→ Eibar (loan)	33	(1)
2010–2011	Olympiacos	16	(0)
2011–2013	Granada	18	(0)
2013–2014	Girona	10	(1)
Total		346	(10)

International career
1997–1998	Spain U16	2	(0)
2009	Catalonia	1	(1)

Managerial career
- 2018–2021: Espanyol (youth)
- 2021–2022: Figueres
- 2026–: PAOK (assistant)
- * Club domestic league appearances and goals

Moisés Hurtado Pérez (born 20 February 1981) is a Spanish former professional footballer who played as a defensive midfielder.

He was noted for his physical approach, which led to many bookings, and spent most of his career at Espanyol, with which he played the 2007 UEFA Cup final. He appeared in 179 official games for the club over seven La Liga seasons.

== Club career ==
Born in Sabadell, Barcelona, Catalonia, Hurtado was a product of RCD Espanyol's youth system. He first appeared with the main squad in La Liga in the last game of the 2001–02 season, still going on to spend several years with their B team.

Following a Segunda División loan at SD Eibar, Hurtado returned as an important midfield element, renewing his contract until 2009 and scoring his first goal for the club in 2006–07, a 2–1 home win over RC Celta de Vigo in the league opener; during that campaign, he also collected 12 yellow cards. Additionally, he played against Sevilla FC in the 2007 UEFA Cup final at Hampden Park, being sent off after a second bookable offence in the 67th minute.

Hurtado only missed four league matches in 2007–08, but received 12 yellow cards. In the following season, as Espanyol fared slightly better, he produced roughly the same numbers, netting twice and being booked 13 times.

In late August 2010, the 29-year-old Hurtado signed a three-year deal with Olympiacos F.C. in Greece, rejoining his former Espanyol manager Ernesto Valverde. However, in the same month of the following year, he terminated his contract and returned to his country, joining top-flight Granada CF for two years.

On 1 February 2013, free agent Hurtado moved to second tier club Girona FC for one season. He renewed his link after taking part in the required number of matches but, after suffering a knee injury during pre-season, all but failed to appear for them again until his release in June 2014.

Hurtado worked as a manager after retiring, starting out in Espanyol's academy in 2018 then being appointed at Tercera División side UE Figueres also in his native region. On 9 May 2022, following the latter's relegation to the regional leagues, he left by mutual consent.

== International career ==
Hurtado scored in his sole cap for Catalonia on 22 December 2009, helping to a 4–2 victory over Argentina at the Camp Nou in Barcelona.

== Honours ==
Espanyol

- Copa del Rey: 2005–06
- UEFA Cup runner-up: 2006–07

Olympiacos

- Super League Greece: 2010–11
