= Alfred Argensó =

Spanish footballer

Personal information
- Full name: Alfred Argensó Salla
- Date of birth: 4 November 1974 (age 52)
- Place of birth: Barcelona, Spain
- Height: 1.85 m (6 ft 1 in)
- Position: Goalkeeper

Team information
- Current team: Roda (goalkeeping coach)

Senior career*
Years	Team	Apps	(Gls)
1993–1998	Espanyol B	93	(0)
1994–1995	→ L'Hospitalet (loan)	0	(0)
1998–2002	Espanyol	31	(0)
1999–2000	→ Badajoz (loan)	33	(0)
2003	Elche	0	(0)
2003–2004	Girona	1	(0)
Total		158	(0)
- * Club domestic league appearances and goals

Alfred Argensó Salla (born 4 November 1974) is a Spanish former professional footballer who played as a goalkeeper. He played in La Liga for Espanyol in the early 2000s, making 31 appearances in the top tier. He is currently a goalkeeping coach at Roda.

== Club career ==
Born in Barcelona, Catalonia, Argensó began his professional career in 1993 with Espanyol, initially playing for the club's B team in the Tercera División. He was part of the team that won the Tercera División in 1994–95, although he also spent some of that year on loan with L'Hospitalet in the Segunda División B. He was promoted to the first team in 1998, but after making no appearances in his first season, he spent the 1999–2000 season on loan at Badajoz in the Segunda División as first choice goalkeeper.

While he never became first choice at Espanyol, Argensó did play a part in each of the next three La Liga seasons, making 31 top tier appearances in total. He moved to Elche in the Segunda División in January 2003, before moving on again to third-tier side Girona in June of the same year. His career came to an end in 2004, aged 29, after just one season with the Catalan club.

== Coaching career ==
Argensó is currently a goalkeeping coach at Valencian Tercera Federación club Roda.
