= David García (footballer, born 1981) =

Spanish footballer

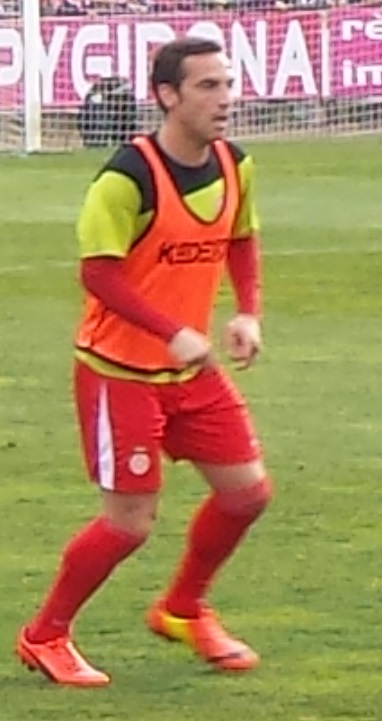
- García training with Girona in 2014

Personal information
- Full name: David García de la Cruz
- Date of birth: 16 January 1981 (age 45)
- Place of birth: Manresa, Spain
- Height: 1.78 m (5 ft 10 in)
- Position: Left-back

Youth career
- 1996–1999: Espanyol

Senior career*
Years	Team	Apps	(Gls)
1999–2001	Espanyol B	58	(2)
1999–2011	Espanyol	217	(1)
2011–2015	Girona	95	(1)
Total		370	(4)

International career
2001	Spain U20	1	(0)
2003	Spain U21	1	(0)
2004–2010	Catalonia	6	(0)
- * Club domestic league appearances and goals

David García de la Cruz (Spanish pronunciation: [daˈβið ɣaɾˈθi.a ðe la ˈkɾuθ]; born 16 January 1981) is a Spanish former professional footballer who played as a left-back.

He spent most of his career with Espanyol, appearing in 243 competitive matches over 12 La Liga seasons and winning two Copa del Rey trophies.

== Club career ==
Born in Manresa, Barcelona, Catalonia, García was a product of RCD Espanyol's academy, and made his La Liga debut on 8 January 2000 in a 0–0 home draw against Deportivo de La Coruña, becoming a regular fixture in the 2001–02 season and also being named second team captain after Raúl Tamudo, the only player to have been on the club's books for longer; on 23 March 2003, he scored the first of only two competitive goals during his career, helping to a 1–1 draw at Valencia CF.

García renewed his link for a further two seasons in February 2007, stating about the deal: "I want to finish my career here. I can't imagine myself wearing any other shirt." During that campaign, however, he only totalled 16 games (nine in the league, adding seven in the club's runner-up run in the UEFA Cup) mainly due to a knee injury.

In 2008–09, García played just 14 matches as he again dealt with physical ailments, but was instrumental in the final stretch, appearing in seven complete fixtures out of the last ten – of which Espanyol won eight. On 12 June 2009 he extended his contract for two additional years, going on to make 38 league appearances during that timeframe.

On 4 August 2011, García moved to Segunda División club Girona FC. He was first-choice for the vast majority of his tenure, retiring at the age of 34 and returning to Espanyol to act as scout for the youth system.

== Honours ==
Espanyol

- Copa del Rey: 1999–2000, 2005–06
- UEFA Cup runner-up: 2006–07
