= Antonio Soldevilla =

Spanish former footballer (born 1978)

Toni Soldevilla
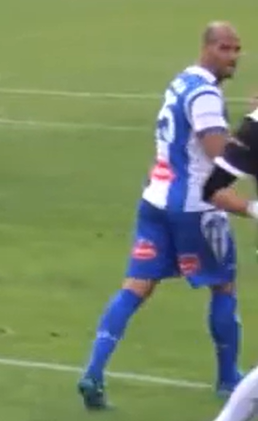
- Soldevilla with Alcoyano in 2013

Personal information
- Full name: Antonio Soldevilla Castellsagué
- Date of birth: 19 December 1978 (age 47)
- Place of birth: L'Hospitalet, Spain
- Height: 1.85 m (6 ft 1 in)
- Position: Centre-back

Youth career
- Espanyol

Senior career*
Years	Team	Apps	(Gls)
1995–1999	Espanyol B	76	(3)
1995–1996	→ Hospitalet (loan)	5	(0)
1997–2005	Espanyol	116	(3)
2005–2006	Poli Ejido	7	(0)
2006–2007	Apollon Limassol	0	(0)
2007–2008	Amkar Perm	5	(0)
2009–2010	Marbella	8	(0)
2010	Caravaca	12	(1)
2011	Ontinyent	8	(1)
2011–2012	Pro Duta	28	(2)
2013	Alcoyano	13	(0)
2013–2014	Jove Español	13	(2)
2014–2015	Eldense	21	(1)
Total		312	(13)

International career
1997	Spain U18	3	(0)
1997	Spain U20	1	(0)
1998	Spain U21	1	(0)
- * Club domestic league appearances and goals

Antonio "Toni" Soldevilla Castellsagué (born 19 December 1978) is a Spanish former professional footballer who played as a central defender.

He amassed La Liga totals of 116 games and three goals, all with Espanyol. He added 122 matches and five goals in the Segunda División B where he represented a host of clubs, and also appeared for teams in Russia and Indonesia.

== Club career ==
Soldevilla was born in L'Hospitalet de Llobregat, Barcelona, Catalonia. Brought through the ranks of RCD Espanyol, he made his first-team debut on 19 February 1997 in a 0–2 La Liga home loss against Athletic Bilbao, being sent off in the game. He made 133 competitive appearances for the club with four goals, eventually becoming first-choice while partnering fellow youth graduate Alberto Lopo in the centre and also captaining the squad.

However, Soldevilla grew unsettled and left it in 2005, citing personal reasons; he had already spent several months away from the game during the 2003–04 season. He signed for Segunda División side Polideportivo Ejido midway through 2005–06.

After an unsuccessful trial with Ipswich Town and starting off 2006–07 in Cyprus with Apollon Limassol FC, Soldevilla became the first Spanish player in the Russian Premier League, joining FC Amkar Perm for the start of the 2007 campaign. He was released in early March 2008.

Soldevilla agreed to a contract at UD Marbella of Segunda División B in December 2009, following a one-month trial. He split the following season also in that tier, totalling 20 matches for Caravaca CF and Ontinyent CF.

== Honours ==
Espanyol

- Copa del Rey: 1999–2000
