= Toni Velamazán =

Spanish footballer

Personal information
- Full name: Antonio Velamazán Tejedor
- Date of birth: 22 January 1977 (age 49)
- Place of birth: Barcelona, Spain
- Height: 1.82 m (5 ft 11 1/2 in)
- Position: Attacking midfielder

Youth career
- 1991–1993: Damm
- 1993–1994: Barcelona

Senior career*
Years	Team	Apps	(Gls)
1994–1996	Barcelona B	38	(8)
1995–1996	Barcelona	11	(3)
1996–1997	Oviedo	34	(2)
1997–1998	Albacete	34	(1)
1998–1999	Extremadura	33	(6)
1999–2006	Espanyol	120	(16)
2006–2007	Almería	13	(0)
2007–2011	Hospitalet	136	(11)
Total		419	(47)

International career
1992–1993	Spain U16	16	(2)
1993–1995	Spain U18	6	(3)
1995	Spain U20	4	(0)
1996–2000	Spain U21	17	(0)
2000	Spain U23	6	(1)
- * Club domestic league appearances and goals

Olympic medal record

Representing Spain

Men's Football
Silver medal – second place	2000 Sydney	Team competition

Antonio "Toni" Velamazán Tejedor (born 22 January 1977) is a Spanish former professional footballer who played as an attacking midfielder.

He spent most of his career with Espanyol, appearing in 141 competitive games over seven La Liga seasons and scoring 19 goals. He started out at Barcelona.

== Club career ==
Born in Barcelona, Catalonia, Velamazán was a youth graduate of FC Barcelona. He made 11 appearances for the first team during the 1995–96 season, under Johan Cruyff, but could never establish himself in the main squad, going on to have one-year spells with Real Oviedo, Albacete Balompié and CF Extremadura.

Velamazán would subsequently settle at Barça neighbours RCD Espanyol, where he spent six and a half years although he started regularly in only two. His best individual season was 1999–2000, as the player scored six goals in 34 La Liga matches and the club also won the Copa del Rey, only ranking 14th in the domestic league however; he suffered a knee injury on 6 January 2002 against Málaga CF from which he never fully recovered, and left the Estadi Olímpic Lluís Companys in January 2006.

Shortly after, Velamazán returned to Segunda División by signing a one-year contract with UD Almería, following which he returned to his native region, joining lowly CE L'Hospitalet and remaining there until his retirement at the end of the 2010–11 campaign, aged 34.

== International career ==
Velamazán started all six matches (although only one complete) at the 2000 Summer Olympics, scoring once as the Spanish team finished second.

== Honours ==
Espanyol

- Copa del Rey: 1999–2000

Spain U23

- Summer Olympic silver medal: 2000
