= Àlex Fernández (footballer, born 1974) =

Spanish footballer

Personal information
- Full name: Àlex Fernández Sánchez
- Date of birth: 14 February 1974 (age 52)
- Place of birth: Palamós, Spain
- Height: 1.76 m (5 ft 9 in)
- Position: Midfielder

Senior career*
Years	Team	Apps	(Gls)
1992–1995	Palamós	44	(4)
1995–1998	Espanyol	14	(2)
1997	→ Lleida (loan)	14	(3)
1998	→ Elche (loan)	14	(2)
1998–2001	Osasuna	79	(8)
2001–2005	Espanyol	95	(4)
2005–2006	Xerez	13	(0)
Total		273	(23)
- * Club domestic league appearances and goals

Àlex Fernández Sánchez (born 14 February 1974) is a Spanish former professional footballer who played as a midfielder. He played in La Liga for both Espanyol and Osasuna, making 125 appearances across two spells with the former.

== Club career ==
Born in Palamós, Girona, Catalonia, Fernández began his professional career in 1992 with local Segunda División side Palamós CF. After making a handful of appearances for his first two seasons, Fernández became key part of the side during the 1994–95 season. Although Palamós finished the year in the relegation places, Fernández's performances earned him a move to La Liga with Espanyol.

Fernández made 20 appearances for Espanyol in all competitions in his first season, but struggled to establish himself in the first team after that. He had loan spells back in the Segunda División with Lleida in 1997 and Elche in 1998, again experiencing relegation with the latter, before a permanent move to the second tier with Osasuna in August 1998.

Fernández was a key part in the Osasuna side for three seasons, and played 37 times as they won promotion as Segunda División runners-up in 1999–2000. In 2001, he returned to Espanyol for a second stint that was much more successful than his first. He made 98 appearances for the club in four seasons, scoring five times, before returning to the Segunda División with Xerez in 2005. He retired a year later, aged 32, having made 16 appearances in his one season with the Andalusian club.

== Honours ==
Osasuna

- Segunda División: runner-up 1999–2000
