= Daniel Sánchez Llibre =

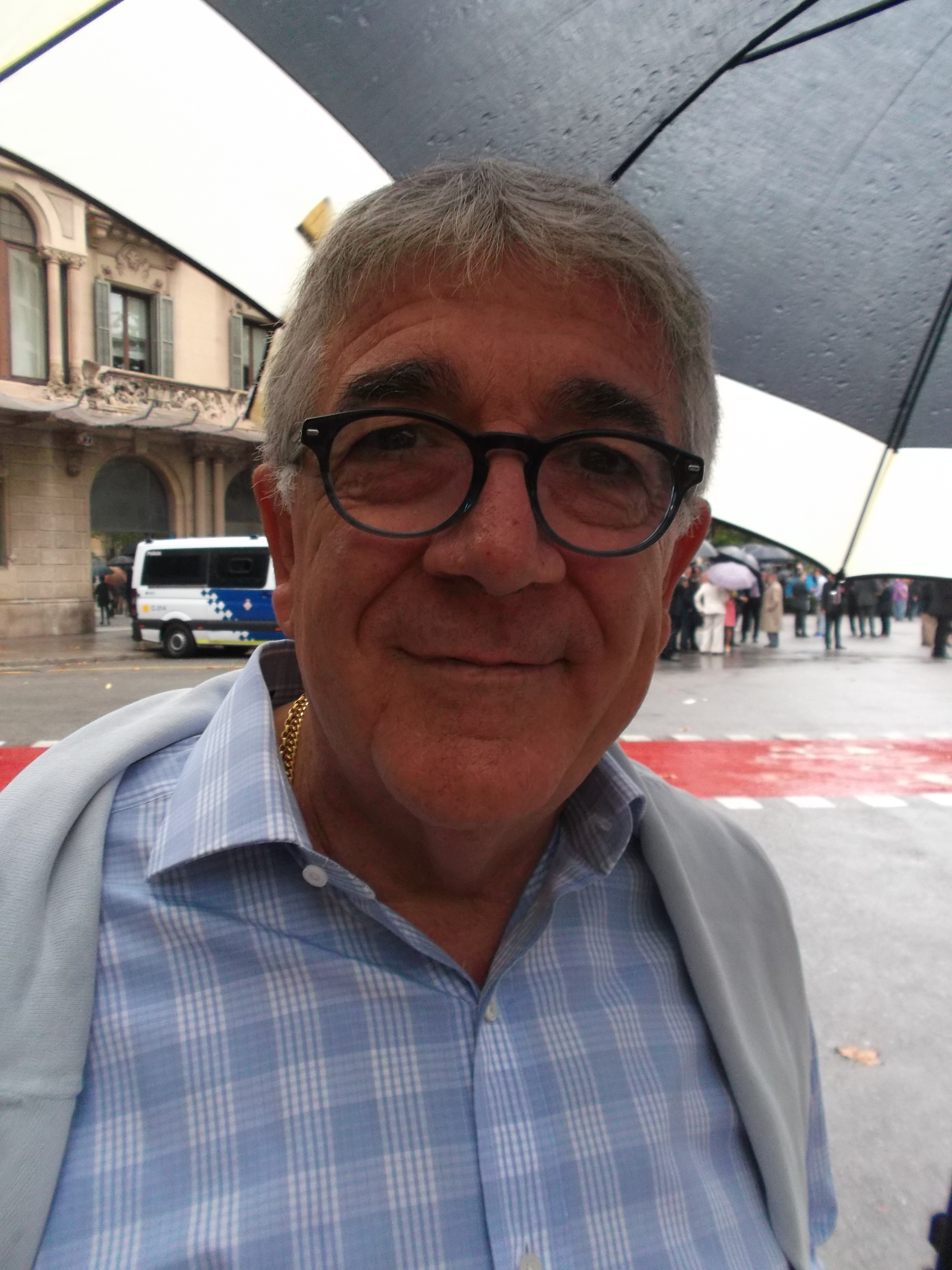
Daniel Sánchez Llibre (2013)

Daniel Sánchez Llibre (born 22 December 1950 in Vilassar de Mar, Catalonia, Spain) is a Spanish businessman and the former President of football club RCD Espanyol.
