= Ángel Morales (Spanish footballer) =

Spanish footballer

Personal information
- Full name: Ángel Morales Cuerva
- Date of birth: 13 July 1975 (age 51)
- Place of birth: Barcelona, Spain
- Height: 1.77 m (5 ft 10 in)
- Position: Defensive midfielder

Youth career
- Montañesa
- Gramenet

Senior career*
Years	Team	Apps	(Gls)
1994–1996	Gramenet	32	(5)
1996–1998	Espanyol B	62	(1)
1997–2005	Espanyol	137	(1)
1998	→ Alavés (loan)	6	(0)
1999	→ Hércules (loan)	21	(1)
1999–2000	→ Alavés (loan)	27	(2)
2005–2007	Gimnàstic	47	(2)
2007–2009	Granada	48	(0)
Total		380	(12)

International career
2002–2004	Catalonia	2	(0)
- * Club domestic league appearances and goals

Ángel Morales Cuerva (born 13 July 1975 in Barcelona, Catalonia) is a Spanish former professional footballer who played as a defensive midfielder.
