= Raúl Tamudo =

Spanish footballer (born 1977)

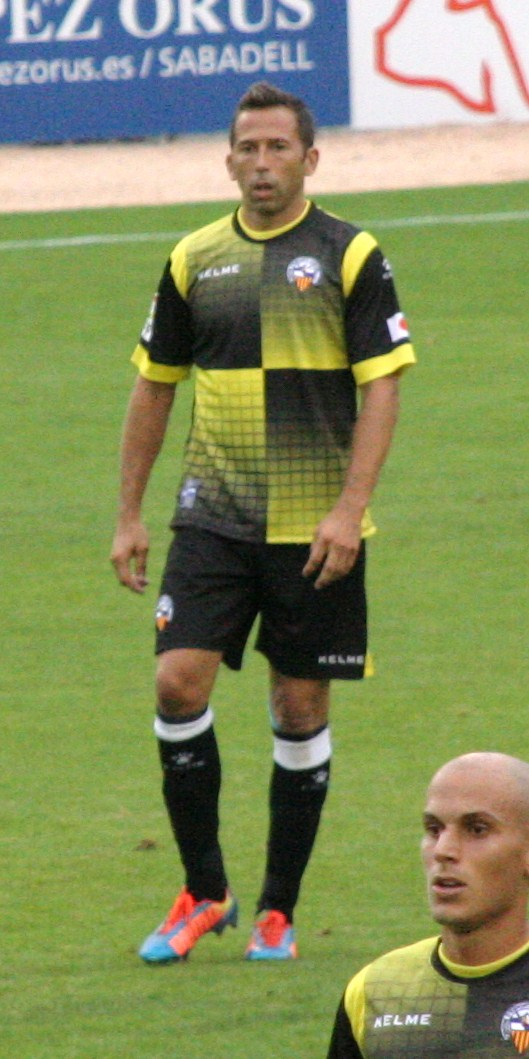
- Tamudo with Sabadell in 2014

Personal information
- Full name: Raúl Tamudo Montero
- Date of birth: 19 October 1977 (age 49)
- Place of birth: Santa Coloma, Spain
- Height: 1.80 m (5 ft 11 in)
- Position: Striker

Youth career
- Fórum
- Gramenet
- 1992–1996: Espanyol

Senior career*
Years	Team	Apps	(Gls)
1996–1998	Espanyol B	46	(20)
1997–2010	Espanyol	340	(129)
1998	→ Alavés (loan)	6	(0)
1999	→ Lleida (loan)	14	(5)
2010–2011	Real Sociedad	31	(7)
2011–2012	Rayo Vallecano	32	(9)
2012	Pachuca	9	(0)
2013	Rayo Vallecano	4	(1)
2013–2015	Sabadell	32	(8)
Total		514	(179)

International career
1997	Spain U20	1	(0)
1998–2000	Spain U21	11	(5)
2000	Spain U23	6	(1)
2000–2007	Spain	13	(5)
1998–2000	Catalonia	2	(1)
Medal record
Representing Spain
Men's football
Summer Olympics
Silver medal – second place	2000 Sydney	Team
- * Club domestic league appearances and goals

Raúl Tamudo Montero (born 19 October 1977) is a Spanish former professional footballer who played as a striker.

An icon at Espanyol, he captained the club for almost a decade, playing 389 official games, winning two Copa del Rey trophies and being their all-time top scorer with 140 goals. He amassed La Liga totals of 407 matches and 146 goals over 17 seasons, also representing Real Sociedad and Rayo Vallecano in the competition.

Tamudo was an international for Spain in the 2000s.

== Club career ==
=== Espanyol ===
Born in Santa Coloma de Gramenet, Barcelona, Catalonia, Tamudo was a product of Espanyol's youth ranks who bought him from local Gramenet for six footballs, and he served two Segunda División six-month loans before finally settling in 1999–2000. From there on, he became an undisputed starter for the team, never scoring in single digits during nine La Liga seasons and helping the Pericos to two Copa del Rey trophies: in the 2000 final against Atlético Madrid, he netted by stealing the ball from goalkeeper Toni Jiménez with his head; he also played a vital role in the 2006 edition, scoring in the second minute of the match and subsequently providing an assist for Luis García on the second goal.

Tamudo was close to signing with Rangers in 2000, only to see the move fail at the last minute due to a failed medical. Two days later, he scored once in the UEFA Cup match against Grazer AK (4–0 home win, 4–1 aggregate).

On the last matchday of the 2006–07 campaign, Tamudo reached 112 goals in the top division to make him the all-time scorer for Espanyol, his brace in the 2–2 away draw against city rivals Barcelona on 9 June 2007 taking him past Marañón's 1983 record and allowing Real Madrid to clinch the title. In that year's UEFA Cup, he contributed two goals in seven games to the side's runner-up campaign which ended at the hands of fellow Spaniards Sevilla; four months after that match, he struck three minutes from time for a 3–2 away victory over the same opponents.

Some injury problems and loss of form limited Tamudo in the following two seasons, and he lost the starting job midway through 2008–09 to newly signed Uruguayan Iván Alonso; however, in the last matchday, he scored three past Málaga in a 3–0 home win – which was good enough for leading the team in goals once again, at six – being replaced to a standing ovation.

2009–10 was nothing short of disastrous for Tamudo, in sporting terms: again, he struggled with some injuries, was ostracised by manager and former teammate Mauricio Pochettino, who also deprived him of his captain armband during preseason in favour of club youth graduate Daniel Jarque, and confronted the board of directors over contractual issues; his status was further diminished in the January transfer window with the signing of another Argentine, Dani Osvaldo, and he eventually finished the campaign with only six league games and no goals.

=== Real Sociedad ===
In late July 2010, Tamudo signed a one-year contract with Real Sociedad, who returned to the top tier after a three-year absence. He scored three times in his first four official appearances, but the Basques only collected one point, losing against Real Madrid (2–1, at home) and Osasuna (3–1).

=== Rayo Vallecano ===
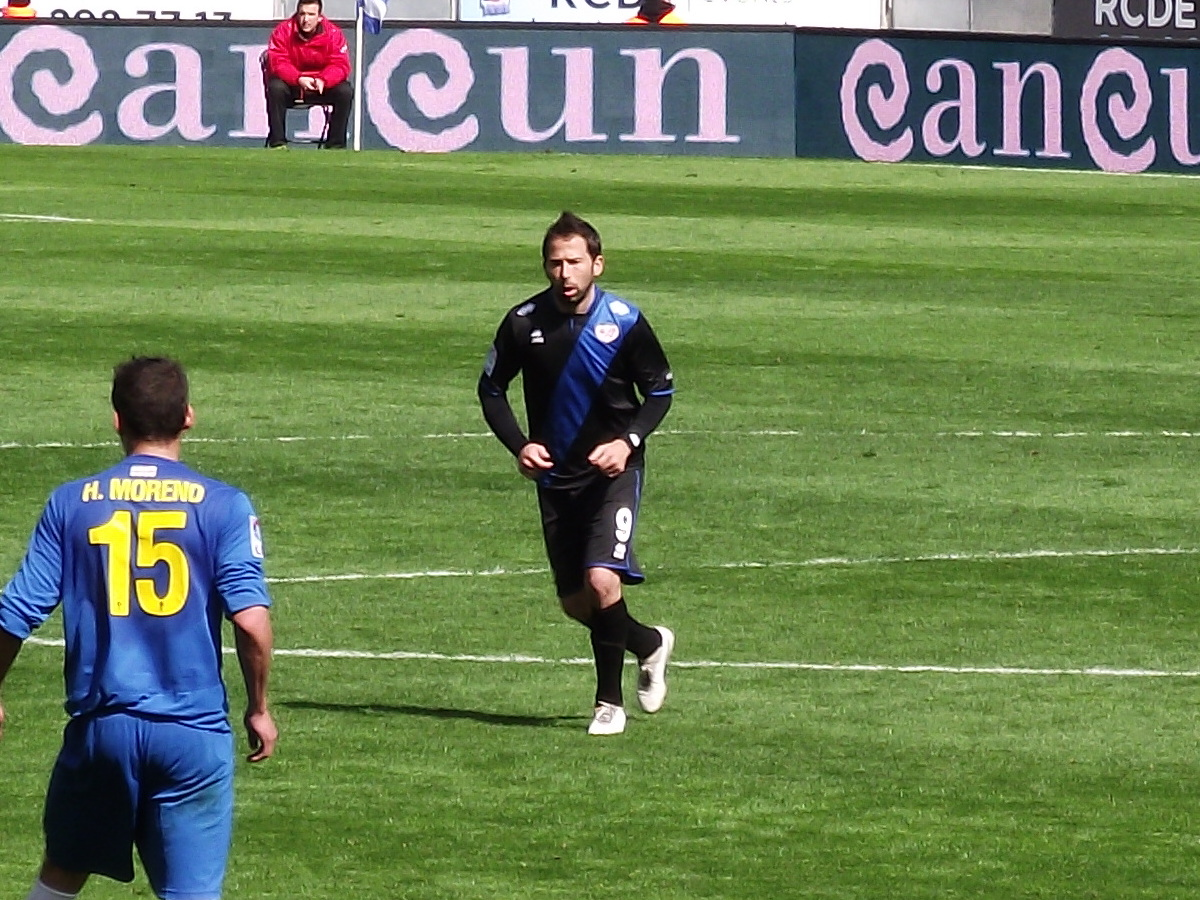
Tamudo playing for Rayo Vallecano on his return to the Cornellà-El Prat Stadium in March 2012

On 26 August 2011, Tamudo moved to Rayo Vallecano on a one-year deal, recently promoted to the main division. He was a starter throughout most of his first season, notably scoring against his former employers Espanyol but in a 5–1 away loss.

On 13 May 2012, Tamudo was brought from the bench for the game's only goal in the 90th minute at home against Granada in the last matchday, with the Madrid outskirts team finally avoiding relegation at the expense of Villarreal.

=== Later career ===
Tamudo moved abroad for the first time at the age of 34, joining Mexico's Pachuca on 14 June 2012. On 11 December, having failed to find the net, he was released, returning to his country and Rayo on the last day of the January transfer window.

Tamudo scored in his second match in his second spell, not being able however to prevent a 3–1 loss at Barcelona on 17 March 2013. In the subsequent off-season, he signed for one year with second-division side Sabadell.

At the start of the 2014–15 campaign, Tamudo scored four times in the first six league games, helping his team to the tenth place in the table. However, during training in October, he suffered an internal meniscus injury to his right knee, going on to be sidelined for several months and being deemed surplus to requirements when he returned to full fitness; Sabadell returned to Segunda División B, and he announced his retirement on 5 September 2015 aged 37.

In December 2022, it was announced that Tamudo, along with other renowned retired footballers, would participate in the Kings League, a seven-a-side football league organised by different internet personalities such as Ibai Llanos or TheGrefg, as well as former players like Iker Casillas and Gerard Piqué. In January 2023, he made his debut in Llanos' team Porcinos alongside Mexican Javier Hernández.

== International career ==
A full international since 16 August 2000 (Germany-Spain, 4–1 loss), Tamudo returned to the lineups after a two-year absence to score a vital goal in a 3–1 away win over Denmark for the UEFA Euro 2008 qualifiers on 13 October 2007; incidentally, Espanyol teammate Albert Riera also found the net. He earned 13 caps in seven years.

Previously, Tamudo was part of Spain's silver medal-winning team at the 2000 Summer Olympics, scoring in the semi-finals against the United States.

== Career statistics ==
=== Club ===
Appearances and goals by club, season and competition
Club	Season	League			National cup		Continental		Other		Total	
Club	Season	Division	Apps	Goals	Apps	Goals	Apps	Goals	Apps	Goals	Apps	Goals
Espanyol	1996–97	La Liga	10	2	—		—		—		10	2
Espanyol	1997–98	La Liga	4	0	1	0	—		—		5	0
Espanyol	1998–99	La Liga	19	8	3	0	6 (Note: Appearances in UEFA Intertoto Cup)	2	—		28	10
Espanyol	1999–00	La Liga	34	10	6	1	—		—		40	11
Espanyol	2000–01	La Liga	30	11	5	1	3 (Note: Appearances in UEFA Cup)	1	2 (Note: Appearances in Supercopa de España)	0	40	13
Espanyol	2001–02	La Liga	35	17	1	0	—		—		36	17
Espanyol	2002–03	La Liga	29	10	1	0	—		—		30	10
Espanyol	2003–04	La Liga	32	19	0	0	—		—		32	19
Espanyol	2004–05	La Liga	30	11	1	0	—		—		32	11
Espanyol	2005–06	La Liga	29	10	3	1	4	2	—		36	13
Espanyol	2006–07	La Liga	31	15	0	0	7	2	1	0	39	17
Espanyol	2007–08	La Liga	25	10	4	1	—		—		29	11
Espanyol	2008–09	La Liga	26	6	0	0	—		—		26	6
Espanyol	2009–10	La Liga	6	0	1	0	—		—		7	0
Espanyol	Total		340	129	26	4	20	7	3	0	389	140
Alavés (loan)	1997–98	Segunda División	6	0	4	0	—		—		10	0
Lleida(loan)	1998–99	Segunda División	14	5	4	1	—		—		18	6
Real Sociedad	2010–11	La Liga	31	7	0	0	—		—		31	7
Rayo Vallecano	2011–12	La Liga	32	9	1	1	—		—		33	10
Pachuca	2012–13	Liga MX	9	0	2	0	—		—		11	0
Rayo Vallecano	2012–13	La Liga	4	1	0	0	—		—		4	1
Sabadell	2013–14	Segunda División	26	4	0	0	—		—		26	4
Sabadell	2014–15	Segunda División	6	4	0	0	—		—		6	4
Career total			468	159	37	6	20	7	3	0	528	172

=== International ===
Scores and results list Spain's goal tally first, score column indicates score after each Tamudo goal.

List of international goals scored by Raúl Tamudo
No.	Date	Venue	Opponent	Score	Result	Competition
1	21 August 2002	Ferenc Puskás Stadium, Budapest, Hungary	Hungary	1–0	1–1	Friendly
2	18 August 2004	Gran Canaria Stadium, Las Palmas, Spain	Venezuela	2–1	3–2	Friendly
3	18 August 2004	Gran Canaria Stadium, Las Palmas, Spain	Venezuela	3–1	3–2	Friendly
4	3 September 2005	Campos de Sport de El Sardinero, Santander, Spain	Canada	1–0	2–1	Friendly
5	13 October 2007	NRGi Park, Aarhus, Denmark	Denmark	1–0	3–1	UEFA Euro 2008 qualifying

== Honours ==
Espanyol

- Copa del Rey: 1999–2000, 2005–06
- UEFA Cup runner-up: 2006–07

Spain U23

- Summer Olympic silver medal: 2000

== See also ==
- List of La Liga players (400+ appearances)
