= 2012–13 RCD Espanyol season =

RCD Espanyol
2012–13 season
- President: Joan Collet
- Head coach: Mauricio Pochettino (until 26 November 2012); Javier Aguirre (from 28 November)
- Stadium: Cornellà-El Prat
- La Liga: 12th
- Copa del Rey: Round of 32
- Top goalscorer: League: Sergio García; Cristhian Stuani (7 each); All: Sergio García; Cristhian Stuani (7 each)
Home colours	Away colours	Third colours

The 2012–13 RCD Espanyol season was the 112th season in the club's history.

== Squad ==
The numbers and players are established according to the official website: www.rcdespanyol.com and www.lfp.es

As of 30 January 2013.

Note: Flags indicate national team as defined under FIFA eligibility rules; some limited exceptions apply. Players may hold more than one non-FIFA nationality.

No.	Pos.	Nation	Player
1	GK	ARG	Cristian Álvarez (captain)
2	DF	BRA	Felipe Mattioni
3	DF	ESP	Raúl Rodríguez
4	MF	ESP	Víctor Sánchez
5	MF	ESP	Sergio Tejera
6	DF	ARG	Juan Forlín
7	MF	ESP	Raúl Baena
8	FW	URU	Christian Stuani
9	FW	ESP	Sergio García (3rd captain)
10	MF	ESP	Joan Verdú (vice-captain)
12	FW	ITA	Samuele Longo (on loan from Inter Milan)

No.	Pos.	Nation	Player
13	GK	ESP	Kiko Casilla
15	DF	MEX	Héctor Moreno
16	DF	ESP	Javi López
17	MF	BUL	Martin Petrov
18	DF	ESP	Joan Capdevila
19	DF	ARG	Diego Colotto
20	MF	POR	Simão Sabrosa
22	MF	GHA	Mubarak Wakaso
23	MF	ESP	Cristian Gómez
24	MF	ESP	Christian Alfonso
27	DF	ESP	Víctor Álvarez

=== Out on loan ===
Note: Flags indicate national team as defined under FIFA eligibility rules; some limited exceptions apply. Players may hold more than one non-FIFA nationality.

No.	Pos.	Nation	Player
—	DF	ESP	Jordi Amat (at Rayo Vallecano until 30 June 2013)
—	MF	ESP	Isaías (at Ponferradina until 30 June 2013)
—	MF	URU	Adrián Luna (at Nacional until 30 June 2013)
—	MF	URU	Juan Albín (at Nacional until 30 June 2013)
—	FW	FRA	Thievy Bifouma (at Las Palmas until 30 June 2013)

=== Foreign players ===
- (Argentina) (Spain) Cristian Álvarez
- (Argentina) (Spain) Diego Colotto
- (Argentina) (Spain) Juan Forlín
- (Brazil) (Italy) Felipe Mattioni
- (Ghana) (Spain) Wakaso Mubarak
- (Mexico) Héctor Moreno
- (Uruguay) (Italy) Juan Albín
- (Uruguay) (Italy) Christian Stuani

== Competitions ==
=== Legend ===
Win Draw Loss Postponed

=== La Liga ===
==== League table ====
Pos	Team	Pld	W	D	L	GF	GA	GD	Pts
11	Levante	38	12	10	16	40	57	−17	46
12	Athletic Bilbao	38	12	9	17	44	65	−21	45
13	Espanyol	38	11	11	16	43	52	−9	44
14	Valladolid	38	11	10	17	49	58	−9	43
15	Granada	38	11	9	18	37	54	−17	42

Source: La Liga
Rules for classification: 1st points; 2nd head-to-head points; 3rd head-to-head goal difference; 4th goal difference; 5th number of goals scored; 7th Fair-play points

==== Matches ====
18 August 2012 1	Mallorca	2–1	Espanyol	Palma
23:00 CEST	Hemed 2', 85'; Nunes (yellow card) 33'; Nsue (yellow card) 38'; Martí (yellow card) 90+1'	Summary	Wakaso 6', (yellow card) 63'; Sánchez (yellow card) 59'	Stadium: Iberostar; Attendance: 12,000; Referee: Alberto Undiano Mallenco

25 August 2012 2	Espanyol	1–2	Real Zaragoza	Barcelona
21:00 CEST	Albín (yellow card) 24' (yellow-red card) 50'; Wakaso (yellow card) 39'; Stuani 43'; Sánchez (yellow card) 79'; Rodríguez (yellow card) 85'; Gómez (yellow card) 90+3'	Summary	Apoño 51' (pen.); Goni (yellow card) 59'; Pintér (yellow card) 66'; Montañes (yellow card) 85'; Postiga 89'	Stadium: Cornellà-El Prat; Attendance: 16,923; Referee: José Luis Paradas Romero

2 September 2012 3	Levante	3–2	Espanyol	Valencia
18:00 CEST	Diop (yellow card) 16'; Juanlu 55'; Lell 56'; Juanfran (yellow card) 58'; Iborra (yellow card) 67' (yellow-red card) 81'; Munúa (yellow card) 86'; Rodríguez 90+3' (o.g.)	Summary	Wakaso (yellow card) 2'; Longo 21'; Tejera 25', (yellow card) 67'; Sánchez (yellow card) 29'; Capdevila (yellow card) 32'; Fonte (yellow card) 39'; C. Álvarez (yellow card) 42'	Stadium: Ciutat de València; Attendance: 10,500; Referee: José Antonio Teixeira Vitienes

16 September 2012 4	Espanyol	3–3	Athletic Bilbao	Barcelona
12:00 CEST	López 18'; Longo (yellow card) 26' (yellow-red card) 81', (goal) 80'; Rodríguez (yellow card) 29'; Verdú 44', (yellow card) 61'; Forlín (yellow card) 53'	Summary	Muniain (yellow card) 26'; Pérez (yellow card) 35'; Gurpegui (yellow card) 48'; Aduriz 56', 83'; Llorente 71'; San José (yellow card) 84'; Amorebieta (yellow card) 90+1'	Stadium: Cornellà-El Prat; Attendance: 23,123; Referee: Pedro Pérez Montero

22 September 2012 5	Real Betis	1–0	Espanyol	Seville
20:00 CEST	Paulão 18'; Beñat (yellow card) 29'; Pérez (yellow card) 46'; Nélson (yellow card) 57'; Nono (yellow card) 71'; Agra (yellow card) 90'; Casto (yellow card) 90+1'	Summary	Tejera (yellow card) 26'; Wakaso (yellow card) 45' (yellow-red card) 67'; López (yellow card) 52'; Stuani (yellow card) 78'; C. Álvarez (yellow card) 90+2'	Stadium: Benito Villamarín; Attendance: 40,000; Referee: Carlos Clos Gómez

30 September 2012 6	Espanyol	0–1	Atlético Madrid	Barcelona
21:30 CEST	Moreno (yellow card) 43'; Stuani (yellow card) 47'; Forlín (yellow card) 60'	Summary	García 30', (yellow card) 66'; Turan (yellow card) 59'; Gabi (yellow card) 60'; Costa (yellow card) 66'	Stadium: Cornellà-El Prat; Attendance: 21,888; Referee: Ignacio Iglesias Villanueva

6 October 2012 7	Real Valladolid	1–1	Espanyol	Valladolid
20:00 CEST	Rukavina (yellow card) 69'; Sereno (yellow card) 75'; Óscar 82'	Summary	V. Álvarez (yellow card) 41' (yellow-red card) 45'; C. Álvarez (yellow card) 45'; Sánchez (yellow card) 57'; Verdú 70' (pen.), (yellow card) 90+2'; Forlín (yellow card) 72'; Fonte (yellow card) 90'	Stadium: José Zorrilla; Attendance: 14,499; Referee: David Fernández Borbalán

21 October 2012 8	Espanyol	3–2	Rayo Vallecano	Barcelona
16:00 CEST	Verdú (yellow card) 12', (goal) 37', 48'; Forlín (yellow card) 15'; Colotto (yellow card) 43' (yellow-red card) 81'; Stuani 90+2'	Summary	Baptistão 12', 63'; Gálvez (yellow card) 14'; Rubén (yellow card) 15'; Labaka (red card) 68'; Rodri (yellow card) 74'	Stadium: Cornellà-El Prat; Attendance: 21,497; Referee: Fernando Teixeira Vitienes

27 October 2012 9	Espanyol	0–0	Málaga	Barcelona
16:00 CEST	Wakaso (yellow card) 23'; Sánchez (yellow card) 34'; Stuani (yellow card) 48'; Forlín (yellow card) 81'	Summary	Fernández (yellow card) 26'; Iturra (yellow card) 32'; Duda (yellow card) 51'; Demichelis (yellow card) 67'; Camacho (yellow card) 83'	Stadium: Cornellà-El Prat; Attendance: 22,000; Referee: Carlos Delgado Ferreiro

4 November 2012 10	Real Sociedad	0–1	Espanyol	San Sebastián
12:00	González (yellow card) 29'	Report	Wakaso (yellow card) 33'; Gómez (yellow card) 42'; Longo (yellow card) 75'; Colotto 77'; Baena (yellow card) 83'; C. Álvarez (yellow card) 90+1'; Stuani (yellow card) 90+2'	Stadium: Anoeta; Attendance: 22,150; Referee: José Luis Paradas Romero

10 November 2012 11	Espanyol	0–3	Osasuna	Barcelona
18:00	Stuani (yellow card) 29'; Moreno (yellow card) 88'	Report	Timor (yellow card) 17'; Cejudo 22'; Armenteros (yellow card) 32'; Damià (yellow card) 48'; Sola 63'; Arribas (yellow card) 72'; Onwu 77'	Stadium: Cornellà-El Prat; Attendance: 20,523; Referee: Jesús Gil Manzano

17 November 2012 12	Valencia	2–1	Espanyol	Valencia
	Viera 16'; Albelda (yellow card) 25'; Jonas (yellow card) 30'; Soldado (yellow card) 38', (goal) 90' (pen.); Ruiz (yellow card) 43'; T. Costa (yellow card) 57'; Guardado (yellow card) 60'; Barragán (yellow card) 78'		Longo 31'; C. Álvarez (yellow card) 66'; Rodríguez (yellow card) 66'; Forlín (yellow card) 70'; Moreno (yellow card) 87' (red card) 87'; Tejera (yellow card) 87'; Verdú (yellow card) 87'; Wakaso (yellow card) 87'; García (red card) 88'	Stadium: Mestalla; Attendance: 40,000; Referee: Carlos del Cerro Grande

25 November 2012 13	Espanyol	0–2	Getafe	Barcelona
	Forlín (yellow card) 50'; López (yellow card) 72'		Pedro León 17', (yellow card) 64'; Míchel (yellow card) 64'; Mané 90+1'	Stadium: Cornellà-El Prat; Attendance: 19,053; Referee: Alejandro Hernández Hernández

2 December 2012 14	Granada	0–0	Espanyol	Granada
			Simão (yellow card) 48'; López (yellow card) 66'; Wakaso (yellow card) 71'; Longo (yellow card) 75'	Stadium: Los Cármenes; Attendance: 21,000; Referee: Miguel Ayza Gámez

7 December 2012 15	Espanyol	2–2	Sevilla	Barcelona
	Verdú 13' (pen.); Stuani (yellow card) 23'; Colotto (yellow card) 37'; Sánchez (yellow card) 45'; Simão 60'; Wakaso (yellow card) 80'; Moreno (yellow card) 88'		Rakitić 24' (pen.); Reyes (yellow card) 33' (yellow-red card) 39'; Perotti (yellow card) 43'; Navarro (yellow card) 79'; Negredo (yellow card) 90', (goal) 90+1'	Stadium: Cornellà-El Prat; Attendance: 16,712; Referee: César Muñiz Fernández

16 December 2012 16	Real Madrid	2–2	Espanyol	Madrid
	Ronaldo 45+1', (yellow card) 80'; Coentrão 48'; Alonso (yellow card) 70'		Wakaso (yellow card) 13'; García 31'; Alfonso (yellow card) 61'; Sánchez (yellow card) 79'; Albín 88', (yellow card) 89'	Stadium: Santiago Bernabéu; Attendance: 65,000; Referee: Antonio Mateu Lahoz

20 December 2012 17	Espanyol	2–0	Deportivo La Coruña	Barcelona
	Sánchez (yellow card) 26'; Simão 30'; Baena (yellow card) 84'; Stuani 88'		Aythami (yellow card) 36'; Pizzi (yellow card) 90+4'	Stadium: Cornellà-El Prat; Attendance: 22,000; Referee: Carlos Velasco Carballo

6 January 2013 18	Barcelona	4–0	Espanyol	Barcelona
	Xavi 10'; Pedro 15', 27'; Messi 29' (pen.)		Casilla (yellow card) 28'; Baena (yellow card) 53'; Stuani (yellow card) 73'; Moreno (yellow card) 85'	Stadium: Camp Nou; Attendance: 73,760; Referee: Jesús Gil Manzano

12 January 2013 19	Espanyol	1–0	Celta Vigo	Barcelona
	Forlín (yellow card) 14'; García; J. López (yellow card) 30'; Sánchez (yellow card) 48'; Simão (yellow card) 65'; Baena (yellow card) 67'; Colotto (yellow card) 84'		Á. López (yellow card) 32'	Stadium: Cornellà-El Prat; Attendance: 20,723; Referee: Miguel Pérez Lasa

18 January 2013 20	Espanyol	3–2	Mallorca	Barcelona
	Simão 16'; Verdú (yellow card) 27', (goal) 68' (pen.); Forlín (yellow card) 39'; Baena 83'; Tejera (yellow card) 90+4'; Casilla (yellow card) 90+5'		Dos Santos 35'; Márquez 42'; Luna (yellow card) 45+1' (yellow-red card) 81'; Hemed (yellow card) 80'	Stadium: Cornellà-El Prat; Attendance: 17,169; Referee: Carlos Clos Gómez

26 January 2013 21	Real Zaragoza	0–0	Espanyol	Zaragoza
	Abraham (yellow card) 20'; Săpunaru (yellow card) 51' (yellow-red card) 82'		López (yellow card) 23' (yellow-red card) 79'; Sánchez (yellow card) 33'; Stuani (yellow card) 59'; Gómez (yellow card) 74'	Stadium: La Romareda; Attendance: 18,000; Referee: Pedro Pérez Montero

2 February 2013 22	Espanyol	3–2	Levante	Barcelona
	Baena (yellow card) 37'; Iborra 42' (o.g.); Stuani 67'; S. García 69'		R. García 47'; Diop (yellow card) 53'; Rodas (yellow card) 60'; Martins 87'	Stadium: Cornellà-El Prat; Attendance: 20,121; Referee: Carlos del Cerro Grande

10 February 2013 23	Athletic Bilbao	0–4	Espanyol	Bilbao
	San José (yellow card) 37'; Laporte (yellow card) 74'		Simão (yellow card) 18'; Moreno 28'; Stuani (yellow card) 33', (goal) 58'; García (yellow card) 38'; Casilla (yellow card) 43'; Capdevila (yellow card) 45+1'; Sánchez (yellow card) 45+3', (goal) 57'; Verdú 75'; Forlín (yellow card) 83'	Stadium: San Mamés; Attendance: 32,000; Referee: Carlos Velasco Carballo

17 February 2013 24	Espanyol	1–0	Real Betis	Barcelona
	García 7'; Sánchez (yellow card) 36'; Mattioni (yellow card) 51'; Capdevila (yellow card) 65'; Simão (yellow card) 77'		Paulão (yellow card) 61'; Juan Carlos (yellow card) 79'; Perquis (yellow card) 88'	Stadium: Cornellà-El Prat; Attendance: 20,410; Referee: Jesús Gil Manzano

24 February 2013 25	Atlético Madrid	1–0	Espanyol	Madrid
	Gabi (yellow card) 34' (yellow-red card) 45+4'; Tiago (yellow card) 34'; Falcao 38' (pen.); Turan (yellow card) 56'; Courtois (yellow card) 90+2'		Forlín (yellow card) 6'; Casilla (yellow card) 14'; Stuani (yellow card) 34'; Moreno (yellow card) 37'; Colotto (yellow card) 58'; Longo (yellow card) 79'; Sánchez (yellow card) 90+2'	Stadium: Vicente Calderón; Attendance: 40,000; Referee: Carlos Clos Gómez

3 March 2013 26	Espanyol	0–0	Real Valladolid	Barcelona
			Larsson (yellow card) 48'	Stadium: Cornellà-El Prat; Attendance: 20,423; Referee: Antonio Mateu Lahoz

9 March 2013 27	Rayo Vallecano	2–0	Espanyol	Madrid
	Casado (yellow card) 6'; Domínguez 9', (yellow card) 25'; Piti 77'; Fuego (yellow card) 83'; Baptistão (yellow card) 90+1'		Stuani (yellow card) 16'; Simão (yellow card) 25'; Sánchez (yellow card) 39'; López (yellow card) 51'; García (yellow card) 64'	Stadium: Campo de Vallecas; Attendance: 8,292; Referee: César Muñiz Fernández

17 March 2013 28	Málaga	0–2	Espanyol	Málaga
	Duda (yellow card) 75'; Camacho (yellow card) 86'		Wakaso (yellow card) 43'; Colotto 49'; Forlín (yellow card) 55'; Verdú (yellow card) 60'; García 66'	Stadium: La Rosaleda; Attendance: 27,000; Referee: Carlos del Cerro Grande

31 March 2013 29	Espanyol	2–2	Real Sociedad	Barcelona
	García 9'; Forlín (yellow card) 25'; Stuani 39'; Sánchez (yellow card) 68'		Zurutuza 24'; I. Martínez (yellow card) 51'; Agirretxe (yellow card) 75'; López 76' (o.g.); González (yellow card) 78'; De la Bella (yellow card) 88'	Stadium: Cornellà-El Prat; Attendance: 22,323; Referee: Pedro Pérez Montero

7 April 2013 30	Osasuna	0–2	Espanyol	Pamplona
	Arribas (yellow card) 18'; Oier (yellow card) 69'; Bertrán (yellow card) 77'; Silva (yellow card) 81'		Stuani (yellow card) 12'; Moreno (yellow card) 36', (goal) 51'; Colotto (yellow card) 54'; López (yellow card) 71'; Wakaso 90+1'	Stadium: El Sadar; Attendance: 17,501; Referee: Jesús Gil Manzano

13 April 2013 31	Espanyol	3–3	Valencia	Barcelona
	Wakaso 45+1'; Sánchez (yellow card) 62'; Verdú 82'; García 90+3'; Rodríguez (red card) 90+3'; Moreno (yellow card) 90+4'		R. Costa (yellow card) 23'; Canales 53'; Jonas 87'; Soldado 90+1'; Albelda (yellow card) 90+2'	Stadium: Cornellà-El Prat; Attendance: 24,054; Referee: José González González

21 April 2013 32	Getafe	0–2	Espanyol	Getafe
	Borja (yellow card) 19' (yellow-red card) 52'; Fernández (yellow card) 26' (yellow-red card) 73'; Castro (yellow card) 45'; Torres (yellow card) 68'		Sánchez (yellow card) 3'; Colotto (yellow card) 6'; Stuani (yellow card) 39', (goal) 72'; García (yellow card) 53'; Forlín (yellow card) 63'; C. Álvarez (yellow card) 73'; Wakaso (yellow card) 75'	Stadium: Coliseum Alfonso Pérez; Attendance: 8,000; Referee: Fernando Teixeira Vitienes

28 April 2013 33	Espanyol	0–1	Granada	Barcelona
	Capdevila (yellow card) 84'		Nolito 37'; Roberto (yellow card) 45+2'	Stadium: Cornellà-El Prat; Attendance: 18,506; Referee: Carlos Velasco Carballo

5 May 2013 34	Sevilla	3–0	Espanyol	Seville
	Capdevila 12' (o.g.); Negredo (yellow card) 16', (goal) 23'; Coke 19'		López (yellow card) 45'; Wakaso (yellow card) 72'	Stadium: Ramón Sánchez Pizjuán; Attendance: 35,000; Referee: Carlos Delgado Ferreiro

11 May 2013 35	Espanyol	1–1	Real Madrid	Barcelona
	Stuani 23', (yellow card) 30'; Verdú (yellow card) 51'; Wakaso (yellow card) 61'; Forlín (yellow card) 80'; Capdevila (yellow card) 90+1'; Sánchez (red card) 90+1'		Essien (yellow card) 42'; Higuaín 58'; Alonso (yellow card) 65'; Modrić (yellow card) 69'; Albiol (yellow card) 76'; Ronaldo (yellow card) 80'	Stadium: Cornellà-El Prat; Attendance: 30,023; Referee: Ignacio Iglesias Villanueva

19 May 2013 36	Deportivo La Coruña	2–0	Espanyol	A Coruña
	Pablo (yellow card) 30'; Aguilar (yellow card) 34'; Gama 50'; Valerón (yellow card) 66'; Oliveira 90+1'		Tejera (yellow card) 13'; Baena (yellow card) 41'; López (yellow card) 56'; Colotto (yellow card) 86'	Stadium: Riazor; Attendance: 34,000; Referee: César Muñiz Fernández

26 May 2013 37	Espanyol	0–2	Barcelona	Barcelona
	Rodríguez (yellow card) 45'; Wakaso (yellow card) 80' (yellow-red card) 80'; Capdevila (yellow card) 81'; Forlín (yellow card) 88'		Sánchez 14'; Iniesta (yellow card) 67'; Pedro 86'; Fàbregas (yellow card) 88'	Stadium: Cornellà-El Prat; Attendance: 27,578; Referee: David Fernández Borbalán

1 June 2013 38	Celta Vigo	1–0	Espanyol	Vigo
21:00	Insa 16'; Oubiña (yellow card) 65'		García (yellow card) 18'; Forlín (yellow card) 29' (yellow-red card) 90+2'; Mattioni (yellow card) 77'; Colotto (yellow card) 88'	Stadium: Balaídos; Attendance: 30,000; Referee: Antonio Mateu Lahoz

=== Copa del Rey ===
==== Round of 32 ====
1 November 2012 First leg	Sevilla	3–1	Espanyol	Seville
19:00	Fazio 4'; Cicinho (yellow card) 59'; Cala 83'; Negredo 89' (pen.)	Report	Baena (yellow card) 39'; Alfonso 69'; Simão (yellow card) 71'; Capdevila (yellow card) 82'; Galán (yellow card) 85' (yellow-red card) 89'; Forlín (yellow card) 88'; Sánchez (yellow card) 88'	Stadium: Ramón Sánchez Pizjuán; Attendance: 25,000; Referee: Miguel Pérez Lasa

27 November 2012 Second Leg	Espanyol	0–3	Sevilla	Barcelona
	Wakaso (yellow card) 7'; López (red card) 25'	Report	Perotti 26' (pen.); Botía (yellow card) 38'; Rakitić 45'; Diawara 49'; Cala (yellow card) 81'	Stadium: Cornellà-El Prat; Attendance: 7,463; Referee: Carlos Clos Gómez
