= 2010–11 RCD Espanyol season =

RCD Espanyol
2010–11 season
- President: Daniel Sánchez Llibre
- Head coach: Mauricio Pochettino
- Stadium: Cornellà-El Prat
- La Liga: 8th
- Copa del Rey: Round of 16
- Top goalscorer: League: Dani Osvaldo (13); All: Dani Osvaldo (14)

The 2010–11 RCD Espanyol season was the 80th year in the club's history.

== Summary ==
2010–11 was Espanyol's second full season under Argentine head coach Mauricio Pochettino, who had taken over in late January 2009. He had led them to 11th place in the 2009–10 La Liga table, well clear of relegation, with a top half finish the goal for 2010–11. Their campaign got off to a strong start with a 3–1 home win over Getafe at Cornellà-El Prat on 29 August, courtesy of a brace from Italian striker Dani Osvaldo and a late third from Argentine midfielder Jesús Dátolo.

This began an excellent run of home form, as Espanyol beat Almería, Osasuna, Levante, Málaga, Hércules and Sporting de Gijón, securing seven victories from their first seven home matches by early December. Their away form was, by contrast, dismal, as they lost all their first three matches on the road to Villarreal, Real Madrid and Real Sociedad. They broke this run on 17 October as a Luis García penalty gave them a 1–0 victory over Mallorca at the Iberostar Estadi.

Espanyol's Copa del Rey campaign got underway on 27 October with the first leg of their round of 32 tie against Segunda División side Real Valladolid. They won 2–0 at Estadio José Zorrilla thanks to two goals from Álvaro Vázquez. They resumed their poor away form in the league four days later with a 3–0 loss to Deportivo La Coruña at Estadio Riazor, and their next away fixture ended goalless against Racing Santander at El Sardinero. In between, they found time to complete the job against Valladolid with a 1–1 draw in the second leg, with Osvaldo netting for the hosts.

Their second away league win of the season came on 27 November, with a hard-fought 3–2 victory over Atlético Madrid at Vicente Calderón Stadium. Espanyol twice took the lead, through another García spot kick and a Joan Verdú goal, only for Atleti to equalise each time. However, Osvaldo was on target once again, scoring the winning goal twelve minutes from time. Following the aforementioned win over Gijón at the start of December, the rest of the festive month did not go smoothly for the club. They lost 2–1 to Athletic Bilbao at San Mamés, before suffering their first home loss of the year in a 5–1 thrashing at the hands of Barcelona, although they remained an excellent 5th in the table after sixteen matches.

Espanyol's final match in December was a rematch against Atlético in Madrid, this time in the last 16 of the Copa del Rey. The hosts got their revenge, with Simão's first half penalty earning them a 1–0 win. 2011 started in similar fashion, with a 2–1 loss to Valencia at Mestalla Stadium, followed by a 1–1 draw with Atleti which confirmed their elimination from the Copa del Rey, despite an injury time goal from García. However, they then went on a good run, with a 4–0 home win over Real Zaragoza, and victories on the road against Sevilla and Getafe.

Espanyol ended the month of January by losing 1–0 at home to Villarreal, and this began a sequence of defeats which saw them lose to Almería at Estadio de los Juegos Mediterráneos and Real Madrid at home before a humiliating 4–0 loss to Osasuna at Reyno de Navarra. They recovered some pride at the end of February, as an own goal by Dani Estrada, followed by goals from Sergio García, José Callejón and Javi Márquez, saw them take a 4–1 home win over Real Sociedad. This proved to be a false dawn, as March brought three losses (at home to Mallorca, and on the road against Levante and Málaga) and just one win, a 2–0 home victory over Deportivo La Coruña.

April was even worse, as Espanyol went winless for the whole month. They lost at home to Racing Santander, and at El Molinón against Sporting de Gijón, while fixtures against Hércules at Estadio José Rico Pérez and at home to Atlético Madrid brought only their second and third draws of the campaign respectively. This form saw them drop out of the European qualification place they had occupied for most of the season, and they found themselves 8th in the table with just five matches to play. Goals from Osvaldo and Iván Alonso gave them a 2–1 home win over Athletic Bilbao on 2 May. This would prove to be their final win of the campaign, as they lost their final two away games, against Barcelona and Real Zaragoza, without scoring a goal, separated by a 2–2 home draw with Valencia.

Espanyol's final match of the year saw them hosting Sevilla, and despite second half goals from Osvaldo and Verdú, they were beaten 3–2. Osvaldo's goal was his thirteenth in the league, making him the club's top scorer for the season. They ended the year in 8th place, seven points shy of a 2011–12 UEFA Europa League place, and only six clear of relegation in an incredibly congested table. Although disappointing after their promising form earlier in the season, this marked the club's best league performance since finishing 5th in 2004–05.

== Squad statistics ==
Last updated on 11 June 2021.

No.	Pos	Nat	Player	Total		La Liga		Copa del Rey	
No.	Pos	Nat	Player	Apps	Goals	Apps	Goals	Apps	Goals
1	GK	(Cameroon) CMR	Carlos Kameni	33	0	33	0	0	0
2	DF	(Spain) ESP	Javi Chica	31	0	28+1	0	2	0
3	DF	(Spain) ESP	David García	18	0	16+1	0	1	0
4	MF	(Spain) ESP	Javi Márquez	33	2	26+3	2	3+1	0
5	DF	(Spain) ESP	Jordi Amat	28	0	23+3	0	2	0
7	MF	(Spain) ESP	Raúl Baena	18	0	13+2	0	3	0
8	FW	(Spain) ESP	José Callejón	39	6	36+1	6	0+2	0
9	MF	(Spain) ESP	Iván de la Peña (c)	2	0	0+2	0	0	0
10	MF	(Spain) ESP	Luis García	40	7	36+1	6	2+1	1
11	MF	(Spain) ESP	Joan Verdú	40	5	36+1	5	2+1	0
14	DF	(Spain) ESP	Ernesto Galán	22	1	21+1	1	0	0
15	DF	(Brazil) BRA	Felipe Mattioni	0	0	0	0	0	0
16	DF	(Spain) ESP	Javi López	28	0	18+7	0	2+1	0
17	FW	(Italy) ITA	Dani Osvaldo	26	14	22+2	13	1+1	1
18	DF	(Argentina) ARG	Juan Forlín	25	0	21	0	3+1	0
19	FW	(Spain) ESP	Sergio García	25	3	13+8	3	3+1	0
20	FW	(Spain) ESP	Álvaro Vázquez	34	6	8+22	4	3+1	2
22	MF	(Argentina) ARG	Aldo Duscher	20	0	14+5	0	1	0
23	MF	(Argentina) ARG	Jesús Dátolo	16	2	3+11	2	2	0
24	FW	(Uruguay) URU	Iván Alonso	23	2	10+10	2	2+1	0
25	GK	(Argentina) ARG	Cristian Álvarez	9	0	5	0	4	0
26	GK	(Romania) ROU	Dinu Moldovan	0	0	0	0	0	0
28	MF	(Spain) ESP	Óscar Sielva	0	0	0	0	0	0
29	MF	(Spain) ESP	Manu Molina	9	0	1+6	0	1+1	0
31	FW	(France) FRA	Thievy Bifouma	2	0	0+2	0	0	0
32	DF	(Spain) ESP	Raúl Rodríguez	10	0	8+2	0	0	0
33	MF	(Spain) ESP	David López	4	0	0+4	0	0	0
34	DF	(Spain) ESP	Víctor Álvarez	1	0	0+1	0	0	0
35	FW	(Portugal) POR	Rui Fonte	11	0	0+11	0	0	0
38	DF	(Spain) ESP	Albert Canal	0	0	0	0	0	0
40	MF	(Spain) ESP	Eric López	1	0	0+1	0	0	0
40	MF	(Spain) ESP	Isaías	4	0	0+4	0	0	0
Players who have left the club after the start of the season:
13	GK	(Spain) ESP	Kiko Casilla	0	0	0	0	0	0
30	DF	(Spain) ESP	Víctor Ruiz	18	0	15	0	3	0
	DF	(Spain) ESP	Dídac Vilà	16	0	12+1	0	3	0
	FW	(Spain) ESP	Ferrán Corominas	2	0	0+1	0	1	0
