= 2011–12 RCD Espanyol season =

RCD Espanyol
2011–12 season
- President: Ramon Condal
- Head coach: Mauricio Pochettino
- La Liga: 14th
- Copa del Rey: Quarter-finals

The 2011–12 RCD Espanyol season was the club's 81st year in its history.

== La Liga ==
28 August 2011 1	Mallorca	1–0	Espanyol	Palma
17:00 CEST	Ramis (yellow card) 33'; Hemed (yellow card) 43'; De Guzmán 62'	Summary	Moreno (yellow card) 32'; Márquez (yellow card) 42'	Stadium: Iberostar; Attendance: 12,000; Referee: Pedro Pérez Montero

11 September 2011 2	Espanyol	2–1	Athletic Bilbao	Barcelona
21:00 CEST	López (yellow card) 7'; García 25', 74', (yellow card) 53'	Report	De Marcos (yellow card) 8'; Llorente 62'	Stadium: Cornellà-El Prat; Attendance: 26,000; Referee: Carlos Velasco Carballo

18 September 2011 3	Real Zaragoza	2–1	Espanyol	Zaragoza
15:00 CEST	García 29', 90+2'; Postiga (yellow card) 41'; Mateos (yellow card) 83'	Report	Romaric (yellow card) 33'; Márquez (yellow card) 45'; Weiss (yellow card) 67'; López 71', (yellow card) 75' (yellow-red card) 86'; Moreno (yellow card) 84'	Stadium: La Romareda; Attendance: 26,000; Referee: José Luis Paradas Romero

22 September 2011 4	Espanyol	1–0	Getafe	Getafe
19:00 CEST	Moreno (yellow card) 18'; Bifouma (yellow card) 76'; Pandiani 90+2', (yellow card) 90+2'; García (yellow card) 90+3'	Report	Pérez (yellow card) 40'	Stadium: Coliseum Alfonso Pérez; Attendance: 16,000; Referee: Alberto Undiano Mallenco

25 September 2011 5	Levante	3–1	Espanyol	Valencia
15:00 CEST	Suárez 14' (pen.), 58' (pen.); Juanlu (yellow card) 53'; Barkero 76'	Report	Fonte (yellow card) 18'; Forlín (yellow card) 39'; Amat (red card) 57'; Moreno 73'; Pandiani (red card) 81'; García (yellow card) 85'; Márquez (yellow card) 86'	Stadium: Ciutat de València; Attendance: 10,398; Referee: Miguel Pérez Lasa

2 October 2011 6	Espanyol	0–4	Real Madrid	Barcelona
15:00 CEST	Bifouma (yellow card) 24'; López (yellow card) 29'; Romaric (yellow card) 31'; Weiss (yellow card) 80'	Report	Higuaín 17', 66', 89'; Diarra (yellow card) 60'; Callejón 82'	Stadium: Cornellà-El Prat; Attendance: 38,000; Referee: Fernando Teixeira Vitienes

16 October 2011 7	Rayo Vallecano	0–1	Espanyol	Madrid
	Fuego (yellow card) 80'; Arribas (yellow card) 89'; Tamudo (yellow card) 89'	Report	Márquez (yellow card) 40'; Romaric 56', (yellow card) 61'; Amat (yellow card) 90'	Stadium: Campo de Vallecas; Attendance: 11,000; Referee: Ignacio Iglesias Villanueva

22 October 2011 8	Racing Santander	0–1	Espanyol	Santander
	Adrián (yellow card) 66'	Report	López (yellow card) 28'; Rodríguez (yellow card) 54'; Márquez (yellow card) 55'; García 59'; Álvarez (yellow card) 87'	Stadium: El Sardinero; Attendance: 16,000; Referee: Javier Turienzo Álvarez

27 October 2011 9	Espanyol	1–0	Real Betis	Barcelona
	López (yellow card) 64'; Pandiani 75', (yellow card) 76'; Dátolo (yellow card) 78'; Forlín (yellow card) 81'; Verdú (yellow card) 85'	Report	Beñat (yellow card) 55'; Pereira (yellow card) 89'	Stadium: Cornellà-El Prat; Attendance: 19,000; Referee: José Antonio Teixeira Vitienes

30 October 2011 10	Málaga	2–1	Espanyol	Málaga
	Rondón 5', (yellow card) 90+4'; Apoño 73' (pen.)	Report	Weiss (yellow card) 14'; Forlín (yellow card) 19'; Galán (yellow card) 42'; Vázquez 45'; Álvarez (yellow card) 72'; Romaric (yellow card) 72'	Stadium: La Rosaleda; Attendance: 26,000; Referee: Carlos Delgado Ferreiro

6 November 2011 11	Espanyol	0–0	Villarreal	Barcelona
	Vilà (yellow card) 41'; Forlín (yellow card) 64' (yellow-red card) 75'	Report	De Guzmán (yellow card) 63'; Rodríguez (yellow card) 72'; Bruno (yellow card) 88'	Stadium: Cornellà-El Prat; Attendance: 25,000; Referee: David Fernández Borbalán

20 November 2011 12	Real Sociedad	0–0	Espanyol	San Sebastián
	Llorente (yellow card) 42'; Cadamuro-Bentaïba (yellow card) 46'; Ansotegi (yellow card) 57'; Illarramendi (yellow card) 64'	Report	Vilà (yellow card) 30'	Stadium: Anoeta; Attendance: 23,702; Referee: Carlos del Cerro Grande

27 November 2011 13	Espanyol	1–2	Osasuna	Barcelona
	Forlín (yellow card) 27'; Vázquez 55'; Rodríguez (yellow card) 59'; Verdú (yellow card) 87'; Bifouma (yellow card) 90+1'	Report	Damià (yellow card) 36'; Lamah 44'; Satrústegui (yellow card) 45+1' (yellow-red card) 76'; Nekounam 50', (yellow card) 90+3'; Puñal (yellow card) 88'; Fernández (yellow card) 90+4'	Stadium: Cornellà-El Prat; Attendance: 30,000; Referee: José González González

3 December 2011 14	Valencia	2–1	Espanyol	Valencia
	T. Costa 6' (pen.), (yellow card) 42'; Barragán (yellow card) 18'; Rami (yellow card) 32'; Topal (yellow card) 57'; Hernández (yellow card) 64'; Soldado 60'; Alba (yellow card) 84'	Report	Vilà (yellow card) 6'; Amat (yellow card) 32'; Weiss (yellow card) 44'; Galán (yellow card) 53'; Moreno 69'; Rodríguez (yellow card) 88'	Stadium: Mestalla; Attendance: 41,500; Referee: Carlos Velasco Carballo

11 December 2012 15	Espanyol	4–2	Atlético Madrid	Barcelona
	Verdú 5', 8'; Romaric 19'; Forlín (yellow card) 27'; García (yellow card) 40', (goal) 54'; Baena (yellow card) 63'	Report	Falcao 32'; Assunção (yellow card) 66'; Perea (yellow card) 76'; Turan 83'; Miranda (yellow card) 84'; Godín (yellow card) 90+1'	Stadium: Cornellà-El Prat; Attendance: 26,000; Referee: José Luis Paradas Romero

17 December 2012 16	Sporting de Gijón	1–2	Espanyol	Gijón
	Barral 60'	Report	Bifouma 2'; Weiss (yellow card) 26'; Fonte (yellow card) 76'; García 84'	Stadium: El Molinón; Attendance: 22,000; Referee: Miguel Ayza Gámez

8 January 2012 17	Espanyol	1–1	Barcelona	Barcelona
	Romaric (yellow card) 45+1'; Rodríguez (yellow card) 70'; Vázquez (yellow card) 76', (goal) 86'; García (yellow card) 86'; Amat (yellow card) 90'; Forlín (yellow card) 90+1'; Casilla (yellow card) 90+3'	Report	Messi (yellow card) 14'; Fàbregas 16'	Stadium: Cornellà-El Prat; Attendance: 35,122; Referee: Javier Turienzo Álvarez

14 January 2012 18	Sevilla	0–0	Espanyol	Seville
	Kanouté (yellow card) 75'	Report	Vilà (yellow card) 23'; Forlín (yellow card) 33'; Verdú (yellow card) 76'; Vázquez (yellow card) 78'	Stadium: Ramón Sánchez Pizjuán; Attendance: 31,000; Referee: Fernando Teixeira Vitienes

21 January 2012 19	Espanyol	3–0	Granada	Barcelona
	Baena 26', (yellow card) 77'; Verdú 45+1' (pen.); Fonte 80'	Report	Nyom (yellow card) 45'; Jara (yellow card) 82'; Romero (yellow card) 85'	Stadium: Cornellà-El Prat; Attendance: 18,000; Referee: Carlos del Cerro Grande

28 January 2012 20	Espanyol	1–0	Mallorca	Barcelona
	Weiss 18'; Forlín (yellow card) 52'; Moreno (yellow card) 58'; Gómez (yellow card) 63'; Baena (yellow card) 76'; Bifouma (yellow card) 80'	Report	Cendrós (yellow card) 45'; Aouate (red card) 46'; Flores (yellow card) 88'	Stadium: Cornellà-El Prat; Attendance: 26,000; Referee: Ignacio Iglesias Villanueva

4 February 2012 21	Athletic Bilbao	3–3	Espanyol	Bilbao
	De Marcos 26'; Muniain (yellow card) 28'; López (yellow card) 44'; Llorente 58'; Martínez 65', (yellow card) 90'; Iturraspe (yellow card) 85'; Herrera (yellow card) 86'	Report	Romaric 33'; Weiss 48', (yellow card) 58'; Forlín (yellow card) 70'; Albín 90', (yellow card) 90+1'	Stadium: San Mamés; Attendance: 30,000; Referee: David Fernández Borbalán

12 February 2012 22	Espanyol	0–2	Real Zaragoza	Barcelona
	Vilà (yellow card) 43'; Coutinho (yellow card) 89'	Report	Lafita (yellow card) 44'; Da Silva 55'; Lanzaro (yellow card) 63'; Álvarez (yellow card) 68'; Juan Carlos 90+1'; Zuculini (yellow card) 90+1'; Roberto (yellow card) 90+2'	Stadium: Cornellà-El Prat; Attendance: 32,000; Referee: César Muñiz Fernández

18 February 2012 23	Getafe	1–1	Espanyol	Getafe
	Barrada (yellow card) 3'; Díaz (yellow card) 34'; Fedor 70' (pen.)	Report	Weiss (yellow card) 55'; Vázquez 66'; Bifouma (yellow card) 70'; Galán (yellow card) 71' (yellow-red card) 81'; Romaric (yellow card) 73'	Stadium: Coliseum Alfonso Pérez; Attendance: 9,000; Referee: Antonio Mateu Lahoz

25 February 2012 24	Espanyol	1–2	Levante	Barcelona
	Weiss (yellow card) 51'; Uche 75'	Report	Juanfran (yellow card) 13'; Valdo 24'; Ballesteros (yellow card) 52'; Barkero (yellow card) 58'; Torres (yellow card) 59'; Suárez 89'; Farinós (yellow card) 90+2'	Stadium: Cornellà-El Prat; Attendance: 20,000; Referee: Carlos del Cerro Grande

4 March 2012 25	Real Madrid	5–0	Espanyol	Madrid
	Ronaldo 23'; Carvalho (yellow card) 31'; Khedira 38'; Higuaín 47', 78'; Kaká 66'	Report	Romaric (yellow card) 53'; Forlín (yellow card) 56'; Weiss (yellow card) 67'; Baena (yellow card) 83'	Stadium: Santiago Bernabéu; Attendance: 78,000; Referee: José Antonio Teixeira Vitienes

11 March 2012 26	Espanyol	5–1	Rayo Vallecano	Barcelona
	Uche 4', 45', 68'; Coutinho 10', 23'; López (yellow card) 35'; Baena (yellow card) 61'; Amat (yellow card) 67'; Verdú (yellow card) 73'	Report	Tamudo 54'; Michu (yellow card) 57'; Bangoura (yellow card) 76'	Stadium: Cornellà-El Prat; Attendance: 18,000; Referee: Fernando Teixeira Vitienes

19 March 2012 27	Espanyol	3–1	Racing Santander	Barcelona
	Verdú 26', (yellow card) 53'; Coutinho 33', (yellow card) 81'; García (yellow card) 38'; Forlín (yellow card) 78'; Moreno 80'	Report	Stuani 12'; Espinosa (yellow card) 20'; Gullón (yellow card) 32' (yellow-red card) 52'; Francis (yellow card) 54'	Stadium: Cornellà-El Prat; Attendance: 25,000; Referee: Carlos Velasco Carballo

22 March 2012 28	Real Betis	1–1	Espanyol	Seville
	Juanma (yellow card) 29'; Castro 79'	Report	Baena (yellow card) 42'; Moreno (yellow card) 68'; Pandiani 90+3'	Stadium: Benito Villamarín; Attendance: 34,500; Referee: Ignacio Iglesias Villanueva

25 March 2012 29	Espanyol	1–2	Málaga	Barcelona
	Coutinho 24'; Vilà (yellow card) 27'; López (yellow card) 53'; Baena (yellow card) 73'	Report	Demichelis (yellow card) 52', (goal) 78'; Van Nistelrooy 76'	Stadium: Cornellà-El Prat; Attendance: 24,000; Referee: Carlos Clos Gómez

1 April 2012 30	Villarreal	0–0	Espanyol	Villarreal
	Zapata (yellow card) 42'	Report	Weiss (yellow card) 15'; Uche (yellow card) 28'; Gómez (yellow card) 54'; Casilla (yellow card) 88'	Stadium: El Madrigal; Attendance: 17,000; Referee: José González González

7 April 2012 31	Espanyol	2–2	Real Sociedad	Barcelona
	Rodríguez (yellow card) 20'; García (yellow card) 41'; Demidov 45+1' (o.g.); Weiss 47', (yellow card) 90+4'; Moreno (yellow card) 87'	Report	Vela 12', 15'; Estrada (yellow card) 32'; Prieto (yellow card) 57'; De la Bella (yellow card) 68'; Bravo (yellow card) 90+3'	Stadium: Cornellà-El Prat; Attendance: 18,000; Referee: César Muñiz Fernández

10 April 2012 32	Osasuna	2–0	Espanyol	Pamplona
	García (yellow card) 2', (goal) 53', 69'; Puñal (yellow card) 63'; Damià (yellow card) 89'	Report	Coutinho (yellow card) 17' (yellow-red card) 54'; Baena (yellow card) 23'; Forlín (yellow card) 36' (yellow-red card) 82'; Gómez (yellow card) 56'; López (yellow card) 89'; Moreno (yellow card) 90+3'	Stadium: El Sadar; Attendance: 16,000; Referee: Carlos Velasco Carballo

15 April 2012 33	Espanyol	4–0	Valencia	Barcelona
	Gómez 16'; Verdú 30'; Vilà (yellow card) 33'; Vázquez 58'; Baena (yellow card) 72'; Sánchez (yellow card) 73'; Uche 80'	Report	Alba (yellow card) 7'; Hernández (yellow card) 22'; T. Costa (yellow card) 71'; Mathieu (yellow card) 72'; Aduriz (yellow card) 88'	Stadium: Cornellà-El Prat; Attendance: 24,205; Referee: Ignacio Iglesias Villanueva

22 April 2012 34	Atlético Madrid	3–1	Espanyol	Madrid
	Godín 9', (yellow card) 48'; Gabi (yellow card) 16'; Turan 59', 61'; Falcao (yellow card) 75'	Report	Vilà 19'; López (yellow card) 58'; Moreno (yellow card) 79'	Stadium: Vicente Calderón; Attendance: 45,000; Referee: Carlos Clos Gómez

28 April 2012 35	Espanyol	0–3	Sporting de Gijón	Barcelona
	Moreno (yellow card) 75'; Rodríguez (yellow card) 77'	Report	Colunga 48'; Trejo 71'; Gálvez (yellow card) 72'; Bilić 81'; Botía (yellow card) 82'; Ayoze (yellow card) 88'	Stadium: Cornellà-El Prat; Attendance: 18,000; Referee: Miguel Ayza Gámez

1 May 2012 36	Granada	2–1	Espanyol	Granada
	Ighalo 29', 35'	Report	Weiss (yellow card) 42'; Vilà 54'	Stadium: Los Cármenes; Attendance: 21,000; Referee: Antonio Mateu Lahoz

5 May 2012 37	Barcelona	4–0	Espanyol	Barcelona
	Messi 12', 64' (pen.), 74', 79' (pen.); Busquets (yellow card) 21'; Montoya (yellow card) 70'; Tello (yellow card) 85'; Puyol (yellow card) 89'	Report	Forlín (yellow card) 5'; Sánchez (yellow card) 30'; Álvarez (yellow card) 63'; Vilà (yellow card) 64'; Gómez (yellow card) 64'	Stadium: Camp Nou; Attendance: 98,772; Referee: Fernando Teixeira Vitienes

13 May 2012 38	Espanyol	1–1	Sevilla	Barcelona
	Sánchez (yellow card) 15'; Verdú (yellow card) 55'; Coutinho 77'; López (yellow card) 84'; Pandiani (yellow card) 89'	Report	Deivid (yellow card) 17'; Coke (yellow card) 26'; Negredo 45+2'	Stadium: Cornellà-El Prat; Attendance: 16,627; Referee: César Muñiz Fernández

== Copa del Rey ==
=== Round of 32 ===
13 December 2011 First leg	Celta Vigo	0–0	Espanyol	Vigo
	López (yellow card) 72'	Report	Galán (yellow card) 67'	Stadium: Balaídos; Attendance: 5,000; Referee: Pedro Pérez Montero

20 December 2011 Second leg	RCD Espanyol	4–2 (4–2 agg.)	Celta Vigo	Barcelona
	Weiss 31'; Amat (yellow card) 36' (yellow-red card) 72'; Vázquez 49', 59'; Vilà (yellow card) 53'; García 68'; Gómez (yellow card) 87'	Report	De Lucas (yellow card) 28' (yellow-red card) 28'; Rodríguez 63', 90+2'	Stadium: Cornellà-El Prat; Attendance: 11,410; Referee: Carlos Velasco Carballo

=== Round of 16 ===
5 January 2012 First leg	Córdoba	2–1	Espanyol	Córdoba
	Alberto (yellow card) 26'; García 81'; Caballero 85'	Report	García 39'; Casilla (red card) 51'	Stadium: Nuevo Arcángel; Attendance: 19,300; Referee: Alberto Undiano Mallenco

11 January 2012 Second leg	Espanyol	4–2 (5–4 agg.)	Córdoba	Barcelona
	Vázquez 9', 20', 88'; Verdú (yellow card) 16'; Vilà 35'	Report	Prieto (yellow card) 13'; Alberto 40'; Díaz 49'; Vico (yellow card) 57'	Stadium: Cornellà-El Prat; Attendance: 22,109; Referee: Carlos Clos Gómez

=== Quarter-finals ===
17 January 2012 First leg	Espanyol	3–2	Mirandés	Barcelona
	Weiss 85'; Fonte 87'; Verdú 89'	Report	Arroyo 28'; Martins (yellow card) 41'; Infante 78'; Corral (yellow card) 85'; Iribas (yellow card) 86'	Stadium: Cornellà-El Prat; Attendance: 18,408; Referee: Antonio Mateu Lahoz

24 January 2012 Second leg	Mirandés	2–1 (4–4 agg.)	Espanyol	Miranda de Ebro
	Garmendia (yellow card) 45'; Infante 58'; Caneda 90+2'; Arroyo (yellow card) 90+4'	Report	Mújika 46' (o.g.); Weiss (yellow card) 62'; Galán (yellow card) 69'; Vilà (yellow card) 79'; Casilla (yellow card) 87'	Stadium: Anduva; Attendance: 5,858; Referee: Miguel Ayza Gámez

4–4 on aggregate. Mirandés won on away goals.
