= 2008–09 RCD Espanyol season =

RCD Espanyol
2008–09 season
- President: Daniel Sánchez Llibre
- Head coach: Tintín Márquez (to 30 November); Mané (1 December to 20 January); Mauricio Pochettino (from 20 January)
- Stadium: Estadi Olímpic Lluís Companys
- La Liga: 10th
- Copa del Rey: Quarter-finals
- Top goalscorer: League: Raúl Tamudo (6); All: Román Martínez (7)

The 2008–09 RCD Espanyol season was the 78th year in the club's history.

== Summary ==
The season began with a search for a new manager, after Ernesto Valverde was appointed coach at Super League Greece club Olympiacos on 28 May. In his place, the club appointed Tintín Márquez, who had been assistant manager since 2004, serving under both Valverde and his predecessor Miguel Ángel Lotina.

Periquitos began their La Liga campaign on 30 August with a 1–0 home win over Real Valladolid at Estadi Olímpic Lluís Companys, courtesy of a goal early in the second half from Luis García. They followed this up with a win by the same scoreline against Recreativo de Huelva at Nuevo Colombino, before a 1–1 home draw with Getafe and losses against Sevilla and Barcelona during September.

October brought mixed fortunes for Blanquiazules, with creditable draws against Real Madrid and Villarreal in the league, as well as against Segunda División side Celta Vigo in the first leg of their Copa del Rey round of 32 tie at Balaídos. These were contrasted by a humbling 3–0 loss against Mallorca at ONO Estadi, helped by a brace from Aritz Aduriz. They ended the month without a win, 11th in the table.

November began more brightly, with a 1–0 home win over Osasuna. Raúl Tamudo scored the winner on the hour mark, atoning for missing a penalty in the first half. Espanyol also progressed in the cup, thanks to a 3–0 win over Celta in the return leg. However, they suffered four consecutive losses in the league, to Deportivo de La Coruña, Numancia, Racing de Santander and Sporting de Gijón. Following the Sporting game on 30 November, with the club 17th in the table and only a point clear of the relegation zone, Márquez was sacked. The club acted quickly to replace him, with former Athletic Bilbao manager Mané appointed the following day.

Mané's first game in charge was a 1–1 draw with Real Betis at Estadio Manuel Ruiz de Lopera on 7 December, with Achille Emaná's second half goal for Betis cancelled out by an equaliser from Coro. This was followed by losses at the Mestalla against Valencia and at home to Atlético Madrid, which left the club in the relegation zone at the end of the year.

2009 began with two draws in the league, against Mané's former club Athletic at San Mamés and at home against Almería, either side of an embarrassing 3–2 loss to Segunda División B side Polideportivo Ejido at Santo Domingo in the first leg of their Copa del Rey round of 16 tie. Although a 1–0 win in the second leg was enough for Periquitos to squeeze into the next round on away goals, another humiliation was to follow with a 4–0 loss to Málaga at La Rosaleda on 18 January. This left the club 18th in the table, five points from safety, and brought an end to Mané's short tenure as manager, as he was dismissed on 20 January. He was replaced the same day by Argentine former Espanyol defender Mauricio Pochettino, in his first managerial role.

Pochettino's tenure began with a stern test, with Pep Guardiola's Barcelona visiting for the first leg of the Copa del Rey quarter-final, a match which Pochettino had only two training sessions to prepare for. Despite the lack of preparation, Pochettino's tactical changes helped Blanquiazules secure a surprise 0–0 draw. Although they ultimately lost the return leg at Camp Nou 3–2 to exit the competition, Espanyol's league form began to improve, with three consecutive 1–1 draws against Valladolid, Recreativo and Getafe. They lost their next fixture, at home to Sevilla, but this was followed by the high point of their season. They again faced Barcelona at Camp Nou, where a quick-fire brace early in the second half from Monaco loanee Nenê was enough to secure a 2–1 win, despite Yaya Touré pulling a goal back for the hosts soon afterwards. This was Espanyol's first Derbi Barceloní victory at Camp Nou for 27 years.

The derby win did not immediately allow Periquitos to gain momentum in the league, with only a 3–3 home draw with Mallorca interrupting a run of three losses in four games, against Real Madrid, Villarreal and Osasuna. This left the club bottom of the table at the end of March, eight points from safety with ten games to play. However, they would go on to win eight of their remaining games, only interrupted by a 0–0 draw with Numancia at Los Pajaritos and a 3–2 loss to Atlético Madrid at Vicente Calderón. They escaped the relegation zone thanks to a 2–0 home win over Betis on 26 April, and secured their survival with a game to spare after a 3–0 win over Almería at Estadio del Mediterráneo on 23 May. They ultimately finished the season in a creditable 10th place.

Pochettino later said he had asked for "divine intervention" to improve the club's form, and he was rewarded in early June with a new contract for the next three seasons. 2008–09 was Espanyol's final season playing at Estadi Olímpic Lluís Companys, with their new home at Cornellà-El Prat inaugurated with a 3–0 friendly win over Liverpool on 2 August.

== Squad statistics ==
Last updated on 18 January 2024.

No.	Pos	Nat	Player	Total		La Liga		Copa del Rey	
No.	Pos	Nat	Player	Apps	Goals	Apps	Goals	Apps	Goals
1	GK	(Cameroon) CMR	Carlos Kameni	39	0	37	0	2	0
2	DF	(Spain) ESP	Javi Chica	19	0	12+4	0	3	0
3	DF	(Spain) ESP	David García	17	0	14	0	3	0
4	DF	(Spain) ESP	Jesús María Lacruz	13	0	6+4	0	2+1	0
5	DF	(Spain) ESP	Sergio Sánchez	38	3	33	3	5	0
6	MF	(Argentina) ARG	Román Martínez	36	7	19+13	5	3+1	2
7	MF	(Cape Verde) CPV	Valdo	16	3	4+7	1	4+1	2
8	FW	(Spain) ESP	José Callejón	30	4	9+15	2	5+1	2
9	MF	(Spain) ESP	Iván de la Peña	22	4	19+3	4	0	0
10	MF	(Spain) ESP	Luis García	41	5	35+2	5	3+1	0
11	MF	(Serbia) SRB	Milan Smiljanić	22	0	6+11	0	4+1	0
12	DF	(France) FRA	Grégory Béranger	21	0	16+2	0	2+1	0
13	GK	(Spain) ESP	Javi Ruiz	0	0	0	0	0	0
14	MF	(Spain) ESP	Ángel	20	0	8+7	0	3+2	0
15	DF	(Republic of Ireland) IRL	Steve Finnan	5	0	3+1	0	1	0
16	DF	(Argentina) ARG	Nicolás Pareja	33	3	30	3	3	0
17	MF	(Brazil) BRA	Nenê	39	4	34+1	4	4	0
18	MF	(Spain) ESP	Francisco Rufete	21	0	8+10	0	2+1	0
19	DF	(Spain) ESP	Marc Torrejón	9	0	4+2	0	3	0
20	FW	(Spain) ESP	Coro	28	4	14+12	3	1+1	1
21	DF	(Spain) ESP	Daniel Jarque	39	3	36	2	2+1	1
22	MF	(Spain) ESP	Moisés Hurtado	36	3	31+1	2	4	1
23	FW	(Spain) ESP	Raúl Tamudo	26	6	23+3	6	0	0
24	FW	(Uruguay) URU	Iván Alonso	16	5	13+3	5	0	0
25	GK	(Argentina) ARG	Cristian Álvarez	5	0	1	0	4	0
31	MF	(Spain) ESP	Óscar Sielva	6	0	2+3	0	0+1	0
35	DF	(Spain) ESP	Dídac Vilà	1	0	0	0	0+1	0
Players who have left the club after the start of the season:
	FW	(Spain) ESP	Jonathan Soriano	12	0	1+6	0	3+2	0
