= 2009–10 RCD Espanyol season =

RCD Espanyol
2009–10 season
- President: Daniel Sánchez Llibre
- Head coach: Mauricio Pochettino
- Stadium: Cornellà-El Prat
- La Liga: 11th
- Copa del Rey: Round of 32
- Top goalscorer: League: Dani Osvaldo (7); All: Dani Osvaldo (7)

The 2009–10 RCD Espanyol season was the 79th year in the club's history.

== Summary ==
2009–10 was Espanyol's first full season under Argentine head coach Mauricio Pochettino, who had taken over in late January 2009. They were third from bottom, in the relegation zone, when he took charge, but he ultimately led them to a solid 10th-place finish. This led to him signing a new contract which ran until June 2012.

Espanyol's 2009-10 La Liga campaign got underway on 30 August with a 1–0 away loss to Athletic Bilbao at San Mamés, and their first home game on 12 September also ended in defeat, with Real Madrid winning 3–0 at Cornellà-El Prat. Their first win, and first goals, of the season came a week later at Estadio Riazor, with José Callejón, Juan Forlín and Joan Verdú all on target in a 3–2 victory over Deportivo La Coruña.

Espanyol followed this up with their first home win of the campaign on 23 September, coming from behind to beat Málaga 2–1 thanks to goals from Ben Sahar and Iván Alonso. They finished September with a goalless home draw against Xerez, leaving them 10th in the table after five matches. The same result followed in both of October's away matches, against Villarreal at Estadio José Zorrilla and Sevilla at Ramón Sánchez Pizjuán Stadium.

In between these draws, Espanyol hosted Tenerife, with a brace from Alonso earning them a 2–1 victory. Their Copa del Rey campaign began at the end of October, with the first leg of their round of 32 tie against fellow top fight side Getafe, who took a 2–0 victory at Coliseum Alfonso Pérez. 1 November saw the visit of Real Valladolid in the league, and despite taking the lead through Luis García, the match ended 1–1 after a late equaliser from Haris Medunjanin.

Espanyol failed to score in their next five matches, all of which ended in defeat. Sporting de Gijón won 1–0 at El Molinón, and then consecutive home matches against Getafe saw Espanyol eliminated from the Copa del Rey after a 1–1 draw before losing 2–0 in the league. They then endured consecutive 4–0 defeats, against Atlético Madrid at Vicente Calderón Stadium and at home to Racing Santander. Their final match in this awful run was a 1–0 defeat by Barcelona at Camp Nou. They finally tasted victory again on 20 December, after more than two months without a win, as goals from Javi Márquez and Ferrán Corominas saw them defeat Almería 2–0.

Despite this win, Espanyol's poor form left them 12th in the table at the turn of the year, just four points clear of the relegation zone after fifteen games. After the new year, their results at home and away made for stark contrast. Their first match of 2010 was a 1–0 loss to Valencia at Mestalla Stadium, and they proceeded to suffer away defeats at Osasuna, Real Madrid, Málaga, Tenerife and Racing Santander, alongside draws at Xerez, Real Valladolid and Getafe. At home, however, they secured victories over Real Zaragoza, Athletic Bilbao, Deportivo La Coruña, Sevilla and Atlético Madrid, and drew with Mallorca, Villarreal, Sporting de Gijón and Barcelona.

These runs came to an end in consecutive matches. On 25 April, Espanyol secured their first away victory in over eight months as a García free kick gave them a 1–0 win over Almería at Estadio de los Juegos Mediterráneos. This left them 11th in the table with four matches to play, the first of which was at home against Valencia on 1 May. This ended in their first home loss in almost five months, as the visitors ran out 2–0 winners.

Espanyol also lost their next game, a 1–0 defeat to Real Zaragoza at La Romareda, before coming from behind in their final home game of the season to beat Osasuna 2–1, thanks to goals from Forlín and Dani Osvaldo. Osvaldo's goal was his seventh of the season, which left him as the club's top scorer. Their last match was against Mallorca at Ono Estadi, which ended in a 2–0 defeat. They ended the season one place lower than the previous one, in 11th.

== Squad statistics ==
Last updated on 13 June 2021.

No.	Pos	Nat	Player	Total		La Liga		Copa del Rey	
No.	Pos	Nat	Player	Apps	Goals	Apps	Goals	Apps	Goals
1	GK	(Cameroon) CMR	Carlos Kameni	31	0	31	0	0	0
2	DF	(Spain) ESP	Javi Chica	29	0	27+1	0	1	0
3	DF	(Spain) ESP	David García	22	0	21	0	1	0
4	MF	(Spain) ESP	Javi Márquez	16	1	12+3	1	1	0
5	DF	(Argentina) ARG	Iván Pillud	11	0	6+3	0	2	0
8	FW	(Spain) ESP	José Callejón	37	2	31+5	2	0+1	0
9	MF	(Spain) ESP	Iván de la Peña	5	0	0+4	0	1	0
10	MF	(Spain) ESP	Luis García	38	3	35+1	3	2	0
11	MF	(Spain) ESP	Joan Verdú	36	4	31+3	4	0+2	0
12	DF	(Argentina) ARG	Facundo Roncaglia	23	0	15+6	0	2	0
13	GK	(Spain) ESP	Javi Ruiz	0	0	0	0	0	0
14	FW	(Israel) ISR	Ben Sahar	24	1	5+17	1	1+1	0
16	DF	(Argentina) ARG	Nicolás Pareja	32	0	30	0	2	0
17	FW	(Italy) ITA	Dani Osvaldo	20	7	17+3	7	0	0
18	DF	(Argentina) ARG	Juan Forlín	24	2	23+1	2	0	0
19	MF	(Spain) ESP	Fernando Marqués	22	1	10+11	1	1	0
20	FW	(Spain) ESP	Ferrán Corominas	23	1	11+12	1	0	0
22	MF	(Spain) ESP	Moisés Hurtado	32	0	30+1	0	1	0
23	FW	(Spain) ESP	Raúl Tamudo	7	0	4+2	0	1	0
24	FW	(Uruguay) URU	Iván Alonso	36	6	19+15	5	1+1	1
25	GK	(Argentina) ARG	Cristian Álvarez	10	0	7+1	0	2	0
29	MF	(Spain) ESP	Marc Pedraza	2	0	0+1	0	0+1	0
30	DF	(Spain) ESP	Víctor Ruiz	22	2	21+1	2	0	0
35	DF	(Spain) ESP	Dídac Vilà	11	0	11	0	0	0
36	MF	(Spain) ESP	Javi López	1	0	0+1	0	0	0
37	MF	(Spain) ESP	Raúl Baena	20	0	11+8	0	1	0
40	DF	(Spain) ESP	Jordi Amat	6	0	4+2	0	0	0
42	MF	(Chad) CHA	Azrack Mahamat	2	0	0+2	0	0	0
Players who have left the club after the start of the season:
	MF	(Japan) JPN	Shunsuke Nakamura	15	0	6+7	0	2	0
