= Kiko Casilla =

Spanish footballer (born 1986)

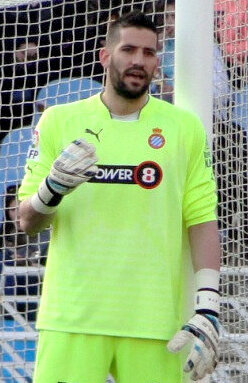
- Casilla playing for Espanyol in 2015

Personal information
- Full name: Francisco Casilla Cortés
- Date of birth: 2 October 1986 (age 40)
- Place of birth: Alcover, Spain
- Height: 1.91 m (6 ft 3 in)
- Position: Goalkeeper

Youth career
- 2000: Gimnàstic
- 2000–2004: Real Madrid

Senior career*
Years	Team	Apps	(Gls)
2004–2006	Real Madrid C	8	(0)
2006–2007	Real Madrid B	5	(0)
2007–2008	Espanyol B	25	(0)
2008–2015	Espanyol	115	(0)
2008–2010	→ Cádiz (loan)	66	(0)
2010–2011	→ Cartagena (loan)	35	(0)
2015–2019	Real Madrid	25	(0)
2019–2022	Leeds United	56	(0)
2021–2022	→ Elche (loan)	14	(0)
2022–2023	Getafe	0	(0)
Total		349	(0)

International career
2005	Spain U19	3	(0)
2008	Spain U21	1	(0)
2014	Spain	1	(0)
2010–2014	Catalonia	5	(0)
- * Club domestic league appearances and goals

Francisco "Kiko" Casilla Cortés (Spanish pronunciation: [ˈkiko kaˈsiʎa]; born 2 October 1986) is a Spanish former professional footballer who played as a goalkeeper.

He started playing for Real Madrid, but only represented the reserve teams in the early stage of his career. He went on to appear in 126 competitive matches for Espanyol over six La Liga seasons before returning to his previous club in 2015, with whom he won three UEFA Champions League titles as backup to Keylor Navas. In 2019–20, he won promotion to the Premier League with Leeds United.

Casilla won one cap for Spain, in 2014.

== Club career ==
=== Real Madrid ===
Born in Alcover, Tarragona, Catalonia, Casilla did not enjoy much playing time in his two-year stint with Real Madrid reserve side, Real Madrid Castilla. In the 2005–06 season, he played in Segunda División after having graduated from the C team, being only third choice after Jordi Codina and David Cobeño.

After only four appearances, Casilla was expected to receive more opportunities after the departure of Cobeño. However, Codina became the starter and Antonio Adán, a fellow youth graduate, the backup, and Casilla ended up playing only in the last game of the campaign, with an eventual relegation befalling.

=== Espanyol ===
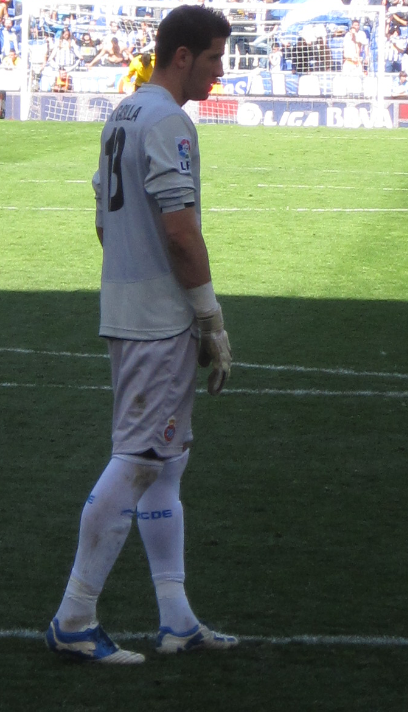
Casilla in 2013

In August 2007, Casilla was acquired by Espanyol on a free transfer. On 20 January 2008, he made his debut in La Liga in a 2–1 away loss against Real Valladolid, coming on as a substitute for injured Iñaki Lafuente two minutes after half-time as the habitual starter Carlos Kameni was away on international duty. That month, news surfaced that Arsenal were interested in acquiring the young Spaniard's services.

Barred by Kameni and new signing Cristian Álvarez, Casilla joined Segunda División B side Cádiz on loan for 2008–09. The move was extended for the entirety of the following campaign after the Andalusians returned to division two, and he again started most of the season, but the team was immediately relegated.

Casilla still sat on the bench for Espanyol's first game in 2010–11 but, on 31 August 2010, moved again on loan to second division club Cartagena. Subsequently returned to the Pericos, he constantly battled for first-choice status with Álvarez.

After the Argentine left, Casilla became the undisputed starter. On 1 February 2015, he was sent off against Sevilla for handling Iago Aspas' shot outside of the penalty area, and his replacement Pau López could not prevent an eventual 2–3 defeat.

=== Return to Real Madrid ===
On 17 July 2015, Casilla returned to Real Madrid on a five-year contract for €6 million. He made his competitive debut on 31 October, in a 3–1 win over Las Palmas.

Casilla played understudy to Keylor Navas in his first season, appearing in seven official matches. Two of those came in the group stage of the UEFA Champions League, as the tournament ended in conquest.

On 9 August 2016, Casilla was in goal for injured Navas in the 3–2 victory against fellow Spaniards Sevilla in the UEFA Super Cup, in Trondheim. He managed to contribute more in his second year, and the club won the national championship after a five-year wait. His Champions League input consisted of the 2–1 group phase defeat of Sporting CP, as they again emerged victorious in the competition.

Casilla made two appearances in the Champions League and 17 in all competitions during 2017–18, as Madrid won their third consecutive and 13th overall title in the tournament. In the following campaign, after the summer signing of Chelsea's Thibaut Courtois, he was further demoted down the pecking order.

=== Leeds United ===
On 17 January 2019, the 32-year-old Casilla moved abroad for the first time in his career and signed a four-and-a-half-year contract at Leeds United of the English Championship. He made his debut nine days later, in a 2–1 win against Rotherham United.

In September 2019, Casilla was accused of racially abusing Charlton Athletic forward Jonathan Leko in a match between the two teams. He was charged by The Football Association but remained available for selection during the investigation. On 28 February 2020, he received an eight-game ban and £60,000 fine after being found guilty.

Casilla played his first game in the Premier League on 16 January 2021, in a 1–0 home loss to Brighton & Hove Albion. He was second-choice to young Frenchman Illan Meslier over the season.

On 12 July 2021, Casilla was loaned to Elche for the next Spanish top-division season. Initially a starter, he eventually lost his place to Edgar Badia.

Casilla's contract at Leeds was terminated by mutual consent on 31 July 2022.

=== Getafe ===
On 10 August 2022, Casilla joined Getafe on a one-year deal.

== International career ==
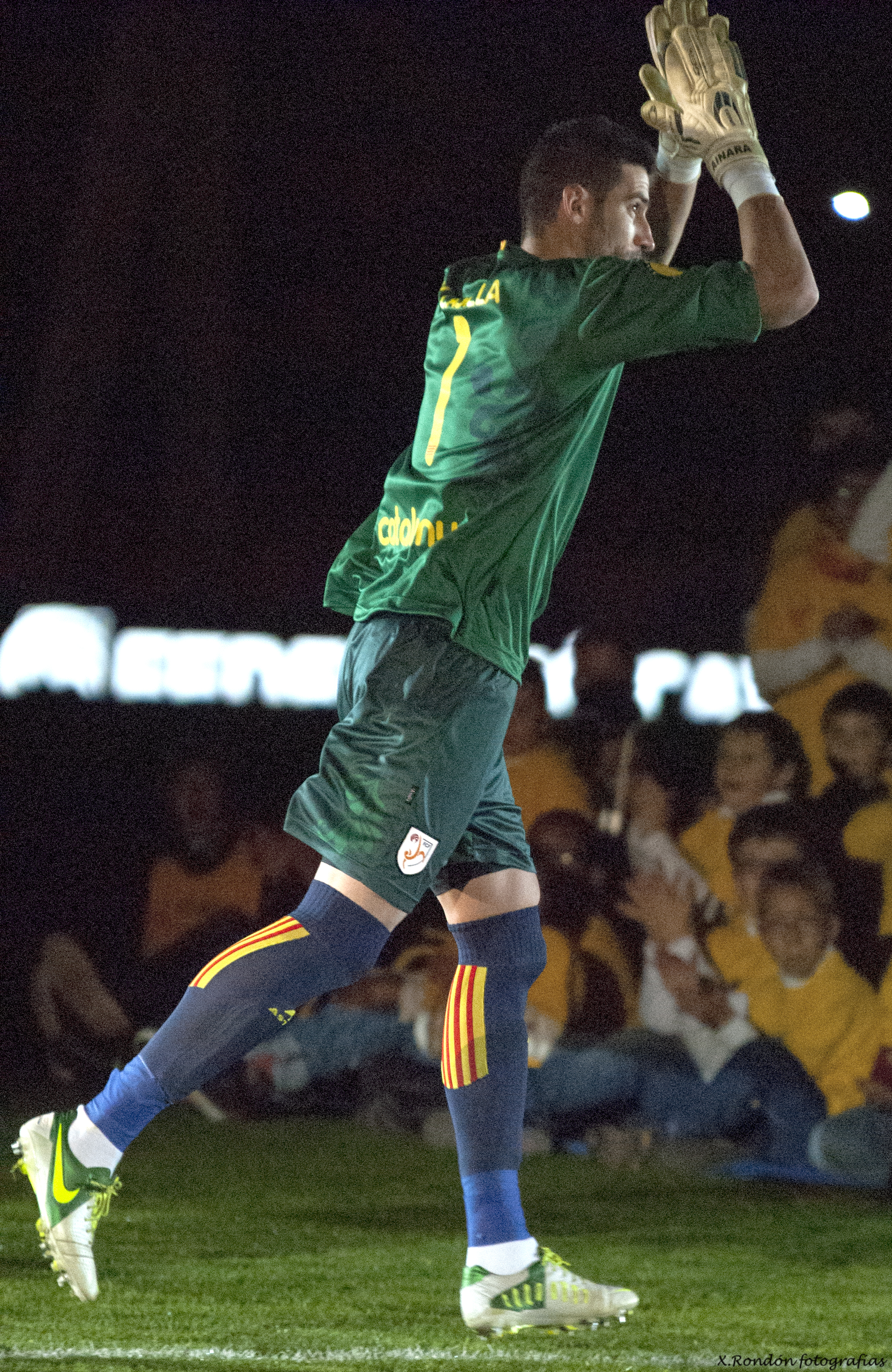
Casilla playing for Catalonia in 2013

Casilla represented Spain at under-21 level once, playing 29 minutes in a 2–0 friendly defeat of France in Benidorm. On 29 August 2014, he was called up to full side manager Vicente del Bosque's 23-man squad for matches against France and Macedonia in September, as third-choice behind Iker Casillas and David de Gea. He only made his debut, however, on 18 November, replacing the former for the last 14 minutes of a friendly with Germany in Vigo and being beaten by Toni Kroos for the game's only goal.

== Career statistics ==
=== Club ===
Appearances and goals by club, season and competition
Club	Season	League			National cup		League cup		Europe		Other		Total	
Club	Season	Division	Apps	Goals	Apps	Goals	Apps	Goals	Apps	Goals	Apps	Goals	Apps	Goals
Real Madrid Castilla	2005–06	Segunda División	4	0	—		—		—		—		4	0
Real Madrid Castilla	2006–07	Segunda División	1	0	—		—		—		—		1	0
Real Madrid Castilla	Total		5	0	—		—		—		—		5	0
Espanyol B	2007–08	Segunda División B	25	0	0	0	—		—		—		25	0
Espanyol	2007–08	La Liga	4	0	0	0	—		—		—		4	0
Espanyol	2010–11	La Liga	0	0	—		—		—		—		0	0
Espanyol	2011–12	La Liga	16	0	5	0	—		—		—		21	0
Espanyol	2012–13	La Liga	21	0	2	0	—		—		—		23	0
Espanyol	2013–14	La Liga	37	0	4	0	—		—		—		41	0
Espanyol	2014–15	La Liga	37	0	0	0	—		—		—		37	0
Espanyol	Total		115	0	11	0	—		—		—		126	0
Cádiz (loan)	2008–09	Segunda División B	35	0	0	0	—		—		—		35	0
Cádiz (loan)	2009–10	Segunda División	31	0	0	0	—		—		—		31	0
Cádiz (loan)	Total		66	0	0	0	—		—		—		66	0
Cartagena (loan)	2010–11	Segunda División	35	0	0	0	—		—		—		35	0
Real Madrid	2015–16	La Liga	4	0	1	0	—		2 (Note: Appearances in UEFA Champions League)	0	0	0	7	0
Real Madrid	2016–17	La Liga	11	0	6	0	—		1	0	1 (Note: Appearance in UEFA Super Cup)	0	19	0
Real Madrid	2017–18	La Liga	10	0	5	0	—		2	0	0	0	17	0
Real Madrid	2018–19	La Liga	0	0	0	0	—		0	0	0	0	0	0
Real Madrid	Total		25	0	12	0	—		5	0	1	0	43	0
Leeds United	2018–19	Championship	17	0	—		—		—		2 (Note: Appearances in Championship play-offs)	0	19	0
Leeds United	2019–20	Championship	36	0	0	0	2 (Note: Appearances in EFL Cup)	0	—		—		38	0
Leeds United	2020–21	Premier League	3	0	1	0	1	0	—		—		5	0
Leeds United	Total		56	0	1	0	3	0	—		2	0	61	0
Leeds United U21	2020–21	—			—		—		—		1 (Note: Appearance in EFL Trophy)	0	1	0
Elche (loan)	2021–22	La Liga	14	0	2	0	—		—		—		16	0
Getafe	2022–23	La Liga	0	0	2	0	—		—		—		2	0
Career total			341	0	28	0	3	0	5	0	4	0	381	0

=== International ===
Appearances and goals by national team and year
National team	Year	Apps	Goals
Spain	2014	1	0
Total		1	0

== Honours ==
Real Madrid

- La Liga: 2016–17
- Supercopa de España: 2017
- UEFA Champions League: 2015–16, 2016–17, 2017–18
- UEFA Super Cup: 2016, 2017
- FIFA Club World Cup: 2016, 2017, 2018

Leeds United

- EFL Championship: 2019–20
