= Cristian Álvarez (footballer, born 1985) =

Argentine footballer

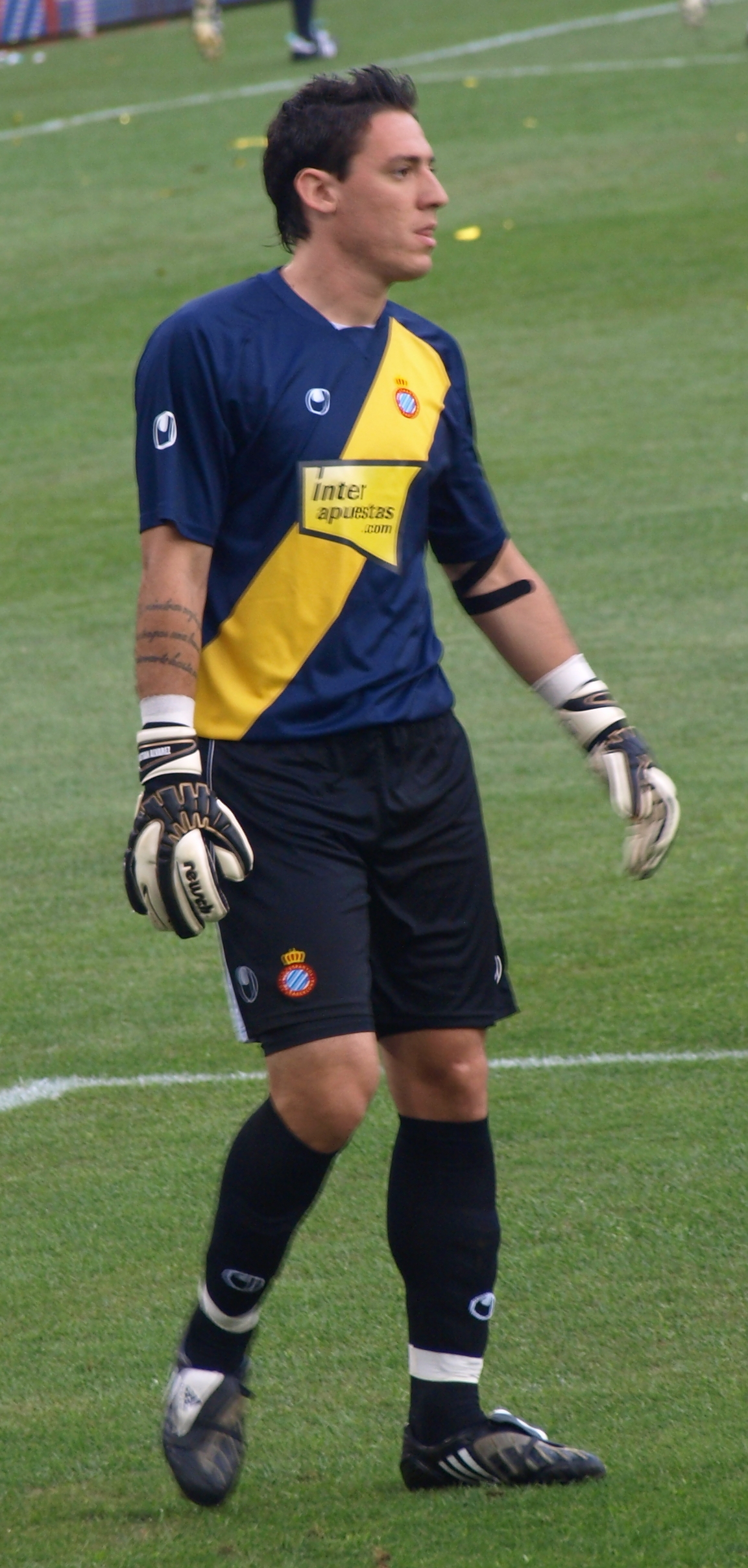
- Álvarez in action for Espanyol in 2009

Personal information
- Full name: Cristian Darío Álvarez Azad
- Date of birth: 13 November 1985 (age 40)
- Place of birth: General Lagos, Argentina
- Height: 1.86 m (6 ft 1 in)
- Position: Goalkeeper

Youth career
- 2001–2005: Rosario Central

Senior career*
Years	Team	Apps	(Gls)
2005–2008	Rosario Central	61	(0)
2008–2013	Espanyol	55	(0)
2013–2016	San Lorenzo	10	(0)
2014–2015	→ Rayo Vallecano (loan)	17	(0)
2015–2016	→ Cerro Porteño (loan)	22	(0)
2017–2025	Zaragoza	230	(1)
Total		395	(1)
- * Club domestic league appearances and goals

Cristian Darío Álvarez Azad (born 13 November 1985) is an Argentine former professional footballer who played as a goalkeeper.

== Club career ==
=== Rosario Central ===
Born in General Lagos, Santa Fe Province, Álvarez came through the youth ranks at hometown club Rosario Central, making his first-team debut in a Copa Libertadores game against Paraguayan side Cerro Porteño on 23 February 2006, a 0–2 home defeat. He went on to fully establish himself as first choice, playing two seasons in the Primera División.

=== Espanyol ===
In late May 2008, Álvarez joined Spanish team RCD Espanyol, signing a five-year contract. He spent most of his spell with the Catalans restricted to Copa del Rey matches, being barred in La Liga by Cameroonian Carlos Kameni; his longest run in the latter competition came during the 2009–10 season as the starter had been selected to the 2010 Africa Cup of Nations and he made four appearances, conceding as many goals in two wins, one draw and one loss.

Álvarez was promoted to first choice for the start of the 2011–12 campaign by manager Mauricio Pochettino, with Kameni also still in the roster.

=== San Lorenzo ===
On 7 July 2013, Álvarez joined San Lorenzo de Almagro on a three-year deal. Initially a starter, he suffered an injury and eventually lost his place to Sebastián Torrico, contributing only three games as his team won the Torneo Inicial.

Álvarez was also an unused substitute in the club's victorious run in the 2014 Copa Libertadores. He returned to Spain and its top division for 2014–15, being loaned to Rayo Vallecano.

In August 2015, still owned by San Lorenzo, Álvarez moved to Cerro Porteño of the Paraguayan Primera División.

=== Zaragoza ===
On 3 August 2017, Álvarez agreed to a one-year contract at Real Zaragoza, with an option to extend for two more years. The following February, after playing a required number of games, this was made effective.

Álvarez put pen to paper to a further extension on 20 August 2020, until 2023. On 30 April 2021, he headed home from a free kick in the 97th minute of the 2–2 Segunda División away draw with CD Lugo.

Álvarez retired on 3 February 2025, aged 39. During his spell at the La Romareda, he made 236 competitive appearances.

== Career statistics ==
Appearances and goals by club, season and competition
Club	Season	League			Cup		Continental		Other		Total	
Club	Season	Division	Apps	Goals	Apps	Goals	Apps	Goals	Apps	Goals	Apps	Goals
Rosario Central	2004–05	Argentine Primera División	0	0	—		—		—		0	0
Rosario Central	2005–06	Argentine Primera División	7	0	—		3	0	—		10	0
Rosario Central	2006–07	Argentine Primera División	20	0	—		—		—		20	0
Rosario Central	2007–08	Argentine Primera División	34	0	—		—		—		34	0
Rosario Central	Total		61	0	—		3	0	—		64	0
Espanyol	2008–09	La Liga	1	0	4	0	—		—		5	0
Espanyol	2009–10	La Liga	8	0	2	0	—		—		10	0
Espanyol	2010–11	La Liga	5	0	4	0	—		—		9	0
Espanyol	2011–12	La Liga	23	0	1	0	—		—		24	0
Espanyol	2012–13	La Liga	18	0	0	0	—		—		18	0
Espanyol	Total		55	0	11	0	—		—		66	0
San Lorenzo	2013–14	Argentine Primera División	10	0	0	0	1	0	—		11	0
Rayo Vallecano (loan)	2014–15	La Liga	17	0	1	0	—		—		18	0
Cerro Porteño (loan)	2015	Paraguayan Primera División	21	0	—		—		—		21	0
Cerro Porteño (loan)	2016	Paraguayan Primera División	1	0	—		0	0	—		1	0
Cerro Porteño (loan)	Total		22	0	—		0	0	—		22	0
Zaragoza	2017–18	Segunda División	36	0	2	0	—		2 (Note: Appearances in La Liga play-offs)	0	40	0
Zaragoza	2018–19	Segunda División	38	0	0	0	—		—		38	0
Zaragoza	2019–20	Segunda División	33	0	0	0	—		2	0	35	0
Zaragoza	2020–21	Segunda División	37	1	0	0	—		—		37	1
Zaragoza	2021–22	Segunda División	38	0	0	0	—		—		38	0
Zaragoza	2022–23	Segunda División	35	0	0	0	—		—		35	0
Zaragoza	2023–24	Segunda División	13	0	0	0	—		—		13	0
Zaragoza	Total		230	1	2	0	—		4	0	236	1
Career Total			395	1	14	0	4	0	4	0	417	1

== Honours ==
San Lorenzo

- Argentine Primera División: 2013 Inicial
- Copa Libertadores: 2014
