= Mathurin Kameni =

Cameroonian footballer

Personal information
- Date of birth: 4 February 1978 (age 48)
- Place of birth: Douala, Cameroon
- Height: 1.91 m (6 ft 3 in)
- Position: Goalkeeper

Youth career
- Kadji Sports

Senior career*
Years	Team	Apps	(Gls)
2001–2004	Cotonsport Garoua	24	(0)
2005	Racing Bafoussam	18	(0)
2005–2010	Haras El Hodoud	83	(0)
Total		125	(0)
- * Club domestic league appearances and goals

Mathurin Kameni (born 4 February 1978) is a Cameroonian former professional footballer who played as a goalkeeper.

== Career ==
Kameni was born in Douala. During his professional career he played for Freeboys Social Football Club of Bamenda, Coton Sport FC de Garoua, RC Bafoussam (January–June 2005) and Haras El Hodoud SC.

Although he did not win any caps, Kameni was part of the Cameroonian squad at the 2004 African Cup of Nations, as the side finished top of its group in the first round before losing in the quarterfinals to Nigeria.

== Personal life ==
Kameni's younger brother, Carlos, was also a footballer, a goalkeeper and an international.
