= Dídac Vilà =

Spanish footballer (born 1989)

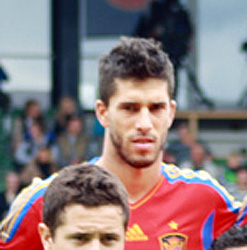
- Vilà before a game with Spain U21 in 2011

Personal information
- Full name: Dídac Vilà Rosselló
- Date of birth: 9 June 1989 (age 37)
- Place of birth: Mataró, Spain
- Height: 1.85 m (6 ft 1 in)
- Position: Left-back

Youth career
- 1998–1999: Mataró
- 1999–2008: Espanyol

Senior career*
| Years | Team | Apps | (Gls) |
| 2008–2010 | Espanyol B | 40 | (3) |
| 2009–2011 | Espanyol | 24 | (0) |
| 2011–2015 | AC Milan | 1 | (0) |
| 2011–2012 | → Espanyol (loan) | 37 | (2) |
| 2013–2014 | → Betis (loan) | 12 | (0) |
| 2014–2015 | → Eibar (loan) | 15 | (0) |
| 2015–2017 | AEK Athens | 58 | (3) |
| 2017–2022 | Espanyol | 99 | (0) |

International career
| 2008 | Spain U19 | 2 | (0) |
| 2009 | Spain U20 | 6 | (0) |
| 2011 | Spain U21 | 8 | (0) |
| 2012 | Spain U23 | 1 | (0) |
| 2011–2019 | Catalonia | 2 | (0) |
- * Club domestic league appearances and goals as of 00:53, 1 July 2022 (UTC)

Dídac Vilà Rosselló (Catalan pronunciation: [ˈdiðəɡ biˈla]; (Note: In isolation, Dídac is pronounced [ˈdiðək].) born 9 June 1989) is a Spanish professional footballer who plays as a left-back.

== Club career ==
=== Espanyol ===
Born in Mataró, Barcelona, Catalonia, Vilà joined local RCD Espanyol's youth system at the age of 10, making his senior debut in 2008–09 and helping the reserves promote from the Tercera División, as champions. He was promoted to the first team by manager Mauricio Pochettino, making his La Liga debut on 30 January 2010 in a 1–0 home win against Athletic Bilbao (which, in his own words, came as a "surprise") and ending his first professional season with 11 league games, starting and playing all the minutes in every match as the Pericos finished in mid-table. Previously, he appeared with the main squad in the 2008 final of the Copa Catalunya, lost 2–1 to UE Sant Andreu, and signed a five-year contract with the club shortly after.

After missing the first months of the 2010–11 campaign due to physical problems, Vilà once again gained first-choice status, taking over longtime incumbent – and fellow youth graduate – David García.

=== AC Milan ===
On 28 January 2011, Vilà was bought by AC Milan in Serie A for a reported €3 million. After only one competitive appearance for the Italians, the 0–0 draw away to Udinese Calcio, and subsequently being highly critical of coach Massimiliano Allegri, he returned to Espanyol in early June 2011 in a season-long loan. He only missed one match during the league campaign, scoring twice but in as many away losses.

Vilà was set to join Valencia CF on loan at the beginning of 2012–13 with the option of making the move permanent at the end of the season, but the deal fell apart as he did not pass the required medical exams. Subsequently, the player underwent surgery.

For the 2013–14 campaign, Vilà moved to Real Betis on loan, again being bothered by physical problems, including a leg fracture; the Andalusians were relegated, and he subsequently joined SD Eibar in another temporary deal. After recovering, he suffered a thigh injury.

=== AEK Athens ===
On 7 August 2015, AEK Athens F.C. announced the signing of Vilà on a three-year deal, with the player stating he hoped this move would see him return to his old form. He played understudy to Aristidis Soiledis during the first part of the season but eventually became the starter, impressing manager Gus Poyet for his professionalism in training.

Vilà started 2016–17's domestic league with a goal, contributing to a 4–1 home victory over Xanthi FC.

=== Espanyol return ===
On 30 August 2017, Vilà returned to his first club Espanyol after agreeing to a three-year deal, with a €25 million buy-out clause.

== International career ==
In 2011, Vilà received his first Spain under-21 call-up. That year, he was selected by manager Luis Milla to the UEFA European Championship in Denmark, playing all the matches and minutes for the eventual champions.

== Career statistics ==
As of 1 July 2021

Appearances and goals by club, season and competition
| Club | Season | League | | | Cup | | League Cup | | Europe | | Total | |
| Club | Season | Division | Apps | Goals | Apps | Goals | Apps | Goals | Apps | Goals | Apps | Goals |
|---|---|---|---|---|---|---|---|---|---|---|---|---|
| Espanyol B | 2008–09 | Tercera División | 30 | 3 | 3 | 0 | 0 | 0 | 0 | 0 | 33 | 3 |
| Espanyol B | 2009–10 | Segunda Division | 10 | 0 | 0 | 0 | 0 | 0 | 0 | 0 | 10 | 0 |
| Espanyol B | Total | | 40 | 3 | 3 | 0 | 0 | 0 | 0 | 0 | 43 | 3 |
| Espanyol | 2008–09 | La Liga | 0 | 0 | 1 | 0 | 0 | 0 | 0 | 0 | 1 | 0 |
| Espanyol | 2009–10 | La Liga | 11 | 0 | 0 | 0 | 0 | 0 | 0 | 0 | 11 | 0 |
| Espanyol | 2010–11 | La Liga | 13 | 0 | 3 | 0 | 0 | 0 | 0 | 0 | 16 | 0 |
| Espanyol | Total | | 24 | 0 | 4 | 0 | 0 | 0 | 0 | 0 | 28 | 0 |
| AC Milan | 2010–11 | Serie A | 1 | 0 | 0 | 0 | 0 | 0 | 0 | 0 | 1 | 0 |
| AC Milan | 2012–13 | Serie A | 0 | 0 | 0 | 0 | 0 | 0 | 0 | 0 | 0 | 0 |
| AC Milan | Total | | 1 | 0 | 0 | 0 | 0 | 0 | 0 | 0 | 1 | 0 |
| Espanyol (loan) | 2011–12 | La Liga | 37 | 2 | 1 | 1 | 0 | 0 | 0 | 0 | 40 | 3 |
| Betis (loan) | 2013–14 | La Liga | 12 | 0 | 2 | 0 | 0 | 0 | 6 | 1 | 20 | 1 |
| Eibar (loan) | 2014–15 | La Liga | 15 | 0 | 1 | 0 | 0 | 0 | 0 | 0 | 16 | 0 |
| AEK Athens | 2015–16 | Super League Greece | 26 | 0 | 5 | 0 | 0 | 0 | 0 | 0 | 31 | 0 |
| AEK Athens | 2016–17 | Super League Greece | 32 | 3 | 8 | 0 | 0 | 0 | 2 | 0 | 42 | 3 |
| AEK Athens | Total | | 58 | 3 | 13 | 0 | 0 | 0 | 2 | 0 | 73 | 3 |
| Espanyol | 2017–18 | La Liga | 14 | 0 | 6 | 0 | — | | — | | 20 | 0 |
| Espanyol | 2018–19 | La Liga | 27 | 0 | 2 | 0 | — | | — | | 29 | 0 |
| Espanyol | 2019–20 | La Liga | 30 | 0 | 0 | 0 | — | | 11 | 1 | 41 | 1 |
| Espanyol | 2020–21 | Segunda División | 19 | 0 | 3 | 0 | — | | — | | 22 | 0 |
| Espanyol | Total | | 90 | 0 | 11 | 0 | 0 | 0 | 11 | 1 | 112 | 1 |
| Career total | | | 277 | 8 | 35 | 1 | 0 | 0 | 19 | 2 | 331 | 11 |

== Honours ==
Espanyol B

- Tercera División: 2008–09

AC Milan

- Serie A: 2010–11

AEK Athens

- Greek Football Cup: 2015–16

Espanyol

- Segunda División: 2020–21

Spain U21

- UEFA European Under-21 Championship: 2011

Spain U20

- Mediterranean Games: 2009
