= Víctor Sánchez (footballer, born 1987) =

Spanish footballer

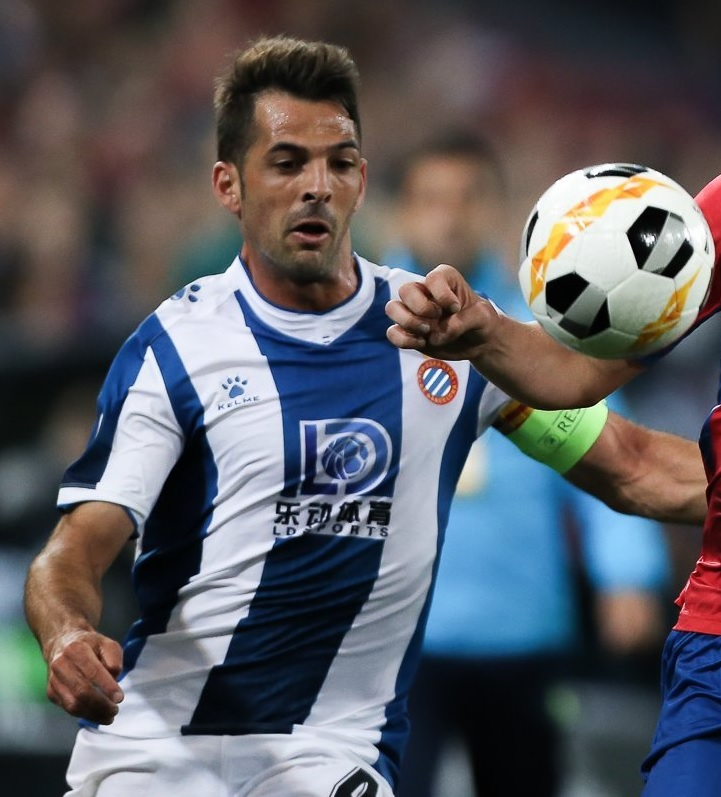
- Sánchez playing for Espanyol in 2019

Personal information
- Full name: Víctor Sánchez Mata
- Date of birth: 8 September 1987 (age 39)
- Place of birth: Terrassa, Spain
- Height: 1.74 m (5 ft 9 in)
- Positions: Midfielder; defender

Youth career
- 1995–1998: Rubí
- 1998–2004: Jàbac Terrassa
- 2004–2005: Europa
- 2005–2006: Barcelona

Senior career*
Years	Team	Apps	(Gls)
2005	Europa	5	(0)
2006–2007	Barcelona C	36	(7)
2007–2009	Barcelona B	45	(5)
2008–2011	Barcelona	8	(0)
2009–2010	→ Xerez (loan)	25	(2)
2010–2011	→ Getafe (loan)	29	(1)
2011	Neuchâtel Xamax	14	(2)
2012–2020	Espanyol	240	(10)
2020–2021	Western United	18	(3)
2022	Girona	5	(0)
Total		425	(30)

International career
2013–2019	Catalonia	4	(0)
- * Club domestic league appearances and goals

Víctor Sánchez Mata (Spanish pronunciation: [ˈbiɣtoɾ ˈsantʃeθ]; born 8 September 1987) is a Spanish former professional footballer. A versatile player, he could act as central or defensive midfielder, and was also adaptable to all the defensive positions.

He made 302 La Liga appearances and scored 13 goals, starting his career with Barcelona and having loans at Xerez and Getafe. He spent 8 1/2 years at Espanyol, for whom he played 270 games in all competitions.

== Club career ==
=== Barcelona ===
Born in Terrassa, Barcelona, Catalonia, and raised in neighbouring Rubí, Sánchez began playing football with local UE Rubí, followed by spells with UFB Jàbac Terrassa and CE Europa before joining FC Barcelona's youth ranks in 2005. In the 2006–07 season, while still with the C side, he played 36 games and scored seven goals. The following campaign, he was promoted to the reserves under Pep Guardiola, helping them return to Segunda División B by contributing 31 matches and two goals, although he missed most of the play-offs because of an injury.

Sánchez made his debut for the first team on 2 January 2008, appearing as a right-back in the 2–2 home draw against CD Alcoyano in the Copa del Rey, at the age of 20. His maiden appearance in La Liga took place on 18 March, at UD Almería (2–2 draw, one minute on the field).

With Guardiola in charge of Barça's main squad, Sánchez took part in their 2008 pre-season. He made a further seven league appearances for the treble champions, but was mainly associated to the B's.

On 12 August 2009, Sánchez was sent to newly promoted Xerez CD on a season-long loan. He scored his first goal for the team on 28 March 2010, in a 3–0 home victory over Real Valladolid. For 2010–11 he was loaned again, joining Madrid's Getafe CF in a season-long move; again, he was put to use in several defensive positions, as the latter narrowly avoided top-flight relegation.

Sánchez and Barcelona mutually agreed to terminate the contract that linked the player to the club in late June 2011. On the 29th, he signed a two-year deal with Swiss Super League's Neuchâtel Xamax FCS.

=== Espanyol ===
In the last minutes of the 2012 winter transfer window, Sánchez returned to his country, penning a three-and-a-half-year contract with Barcelona neighbours RCD Espanyol. Signed by Mauricio Pochettino, he played irregularly for the rest of the season before becoming a mainstay in the side. He scored his first goal on 10 February 2013, in a 4–0 away defeat of Athletic Bilbao. On 11 May, he was sent off for a foul on Real Madrid's Gonzalo Higuaín in a 1–1 draw that gave the league title to his former club.

Sánchez scored twice in a 3–2 home win over Athletic on 23 September 2013 as the Pericos remained unbeaten in five games. He was sent off twice later in the campaign, as their form dipped.

In January 2017, with 18 months remaining of his contract, Sánchez signed a new deal to keep him at the RCDE Stadium until the summer of 2021. On 18 August 2020, following the team's relegation from the top tier, the 33-year-old successfully negotiated a release from his last year.

=== Western United ===
Sánchez joined Western United FC on 27 November 2020 on a two-year deal. He made his A-League debut on 28 December, in a 0–0 home draw with Adelaide United FC in the opening game of the season. He scored his first goal the following 23 January, opening a 5–4 defeat of Perth Glory FC.

In early September 2021, Sánchez quit the Melbourne-based club, having felt alienated by the strict COVID-19 lockdowns in the state of Victoria.

=== Girona ===
Sánchez returned to both Spain and his native region on 1 February 2022, joining Girona FC on a six-month contract. After dealing with some injury problems, he made his Segunda División debut aged nearly 35, as a second-half substitute in the 1–0 win at Almería on 27 March.

In March 2023, Sánchez announced his retirement.

== International career ==
Uncapped by Spain at any level, Sánchez played for the unofficial Catalonia team. He made his debut on 29 December 2013 as a substitute in a 4–1 win against Cape Verde.

== Career statistics ==
As of 19 July 2020

Appearances and goals by club, season and competition
Club	Season	League			Cup		Europe		Total	
Club	Season	Division	Apps	Goals	Apps	Goals	Apps	Goals	Apps	Goals
Barcelona C	2006–07	Tercera División	36	7	–		–		36	7
Barcelona B	2007–08	Tercera División	31	2	–		–		31	2
Barcelona B	2008–09	Segunda División B	14	3	–		–		14	3
Barcelona B	Total		45	5	0	0	0	0	45	5
Barcelona	2007–08	La Liga	1	0	1	0	0	0	2	0
Barcelona	2008–09	La Liga	7	0	2	0	3	0	12	0
Barcelona	Total		8	0	3	0	3	0	14	0
Xerez (loan)	2009–10	La Liga	25	2	2	0	–		27	2
Getafe (loan)	2010–11	La Liga	29	1	3	0	5	0	37	1
Neuchâtel Xamax	2011–12	Swiss Super League	14	2	2	0	–		16	2
Espanyol	2011–12	La Liga	6	0	0	0	0	0	6	0
Espanyol	2012–13	La Liga	33	1	2	0	0	0	35	1
Espanyol	2013–14	La Liga	33	4	4	0	0	0	37	4
Espanyol	2014–15	La Liga	34	3	5	1	0	0	39	4
Espanyol	2015–16	La Liga	29	1	2	0	0	0	31	1
Espanyol	2016–17	La Liga	26	1	1	0	0	0	27	1
Espanyol	2017–18	La Liga	30	0	3	0	0	0	33	0
Espanyol	2018–19	La Liga	24	0	4	0	0	0	28	0
Espanyol	2019–20	La Liga	25	0	1	0	8	0	34	0
Espanyol	Total		240	10	22	1	8	0	270	11
Career total			397	27	32	1	16	0	445	28

== Honours ==
Barcelona

- La Liga: 2008–09
- Copa del Rey: 2008–09
- UEFA Champions League: 2008–09
