= Javi Ruiz =

Spanish footballer

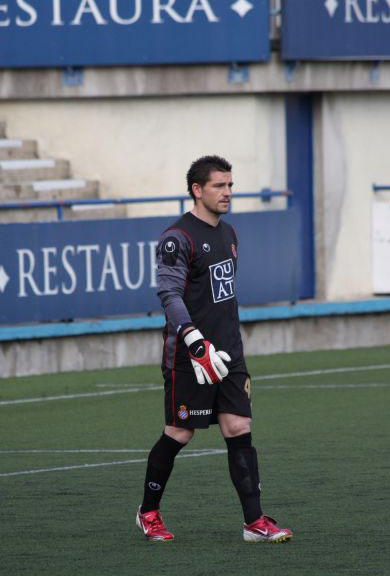
- Ruiz playing with Espanyol in 2009

Personal information
- Full name: Francisco Javier Ruiz Bonilla
- Date of birth: 15 March 1980 (age 46)
- Place of birth: Almería, Spain
- Height: 1.82 m (5 ft 11 1/2 in)
- Position: Goalkeeper

Youth career
- Barcelona

Senior career*
Years	Team	Apps	(Gls)
1997–2000	Barcelona C	28	(0)
1999–2006	Barcelona B	31	(0)
2001–2002	→ Gimnàstic (loan)	10	(0)
2002–2003	→ Almería (loan)	5	(0)
2004	→ Badalona (loan)	3	(0)
2006–2007	Sant Andreu	38	(0)
2007–2008	Adra	22	(0)
2008–2010	Espanyol	0	(0)
2010–2011	Poli Ejido	4	(0)
2011–2012	Roquetas	12	(0)
Total		153	(0)

International career
1998	Spain U18	1	(0)
- * Club domestic league appearances and goals

Francisco Javier 'Javi' Ruiz Bonilla (born 15 March 1980) is a Spanish former professional footballer who played as a goalkeeper.

== Playing career ==
Born in Almería, Andalusia, Ruiz played for modest teams throughout the majority of his career (mostly in Catalonia), spending five seasons with FC Barcelona's reserves while occasionally training with their main squad. He also represented hometown's UD Almería in the Segunda División (only five games out of 42 in his only campaign).

Ruiz was bought by RCD Espanyol from AD Adra on 24 January 2008, as first-choice goalkeeper Carlos Kameni was away on international duty and backup Iñaki Lafuente injured. He left the club in June 2010 without any competitive appearances.

In October 2010, Ruiz signed for Polideportivo Ejido of Segunda División B. The following season, he joined another side in that tier, CD Roquetas.

Ruiz won caps for Spain at under-18 level, starting over Iker Casillas who later starred for Real Madrid.

== Coaching career ==
After retiring, Ruiz worked as a goalkeeper coach with K.A.S. Eupen under his compatriot Tintín Márquez, and Tianjin Tianhai F.C. under Paulo Sousa. In December 2023, following a spell in the Tunisian Ligue Professionnelle 1 in the same role, he reunited with the former at the Qatar national team.
