= Eric López (footballer) =

Spanish footballer

Personal information
- Full name: Eric López Royo
- Date of birth: 1 April 1993 (age 33)
- Place of birth: Barcelona, Spain
- Height: 1.78 m (5 ft 10 in)
- Position: Midfielder

Team information
- Current team: Vilassar de Mar

Youth career
- Espanyol

Senior career*
Years	Team	Apps	(Gls)
2011–2012	Espanyol B	19	(1)
2011–2014	Espanyol	2	(0)
2012–2013	→ Villarreal C (loan)	35	(0)
2013	→ Villarreal B (loan)	1	(0)
2013–2014	→ Cartagena (loan)	2	(0)
2014	→ Prat (loan)	8	(0)
2014–2015	Martinenc	28	(2)
2015	Cultural Leonesa	4	(0)
2016	Júpiter	8	(0)
2016–2017	Vilassar Mar	17	(4)
2017–2018	Granollers	12	(0)
2018-2021	Europa	51	(10)
2019-2020	→ Grama (loan)	16	(1)
2021-2022	Sant Andreu	29	(1)
2022	Vilassar de Mar	11	(0)
2023	Granollers	12	(2)
2023-2024	Martinenc	9	(0)
2025-2026	Martorelles	2	(0)
- * Club domestic league appearances and goals as of 1 October 2025

Eric López Royo (born 1 April 1993) is a Spanish footballer who plays for Vilassar de Mar as a central midfielder. He also played for Sant Andreu and Europa

== Football career ==
Born in Barcelona, Catalonia, López was a product of local RCD Espanyol's youth ranks. He made his competitive debut with the first team on 6 March 2011, playing the last eight minutes of the 0–1 away loss against Levante UD; he added another appearance in La Liga, again being featured as a late substitute in a 0–2 defeat at Málaga CF two weeks later.

López served consecutive loans until his release in 2014. During this timeframe and subsequently, he never competed in higher than Segunda División B.
