= Raúl Rodríguez (footballer) =

Spanish footballer

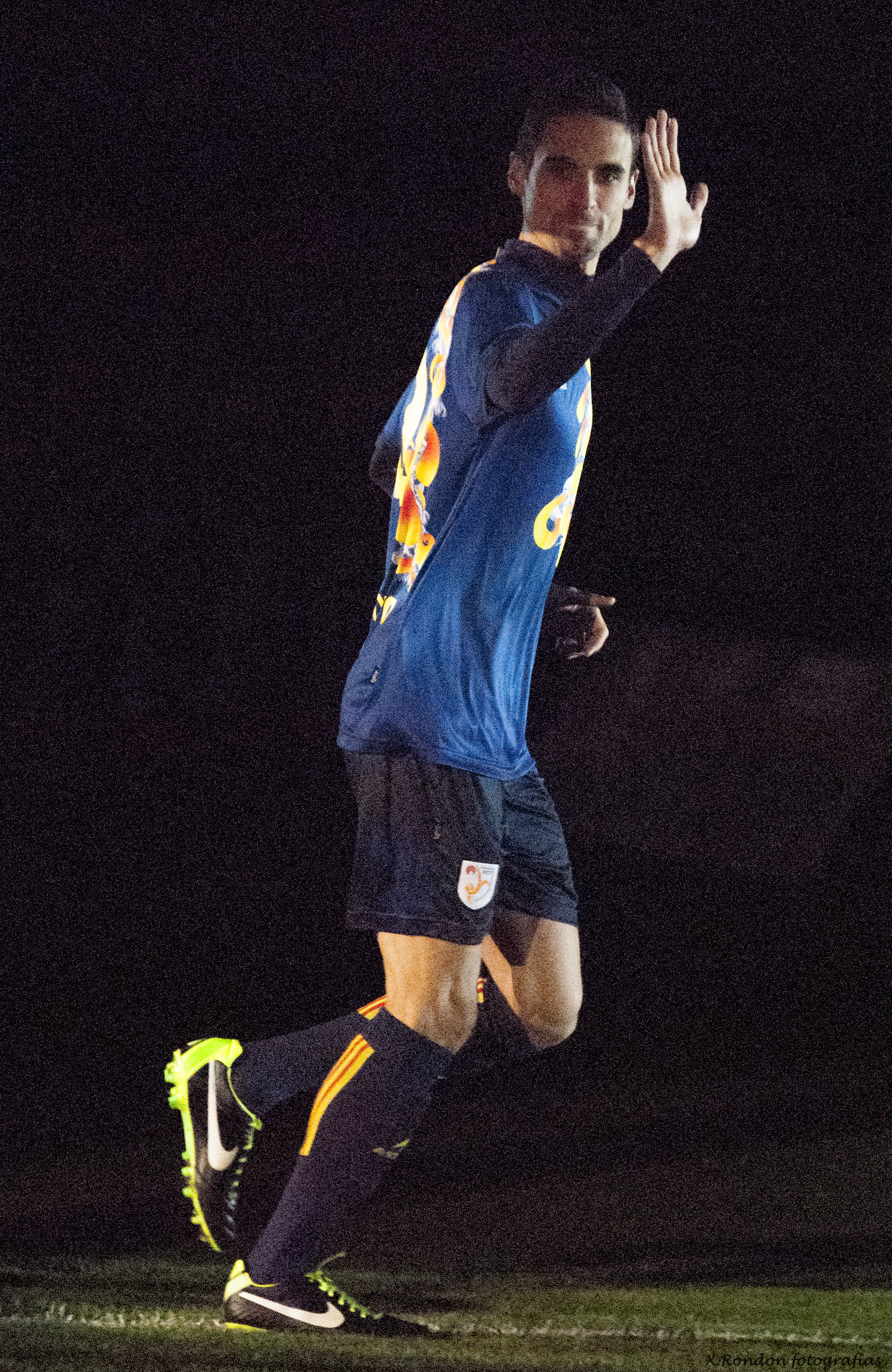
- Rodríguez with Catalonia in 2013

Personal information
- Full name: Raúl Rodríguez Navarro
- Date of birth: 22 September 1987 (age 39)
- Place of birth: Barcelona, Spain
- Height: 1.83 m (6 ft 0 in)
- Position: Centre-back

Youth career
- 1999–2006: Josep Gené

Senior career*
Years	Team	Apps	(Gls)
2006–2007	Vilassar Mar		
2007–2010	Gramenet	83	(3)
2010–2011	Espanyol B	14	(0)
2010–2015	Espanyol	80	(0)
2015–2016	Houston Dynamo	52	(3)
2017	Shanghai Shenxin	28	(3)
2018	Meizhou Meixian Techand	3	(0)
2019	Al-Arabi	3	(0)
Total		263	(9)

International career
2011	Catalonia	1	(0)
- * Club domestic league appearances and goals

Raúl Rodríguez Navarro (Spanish pronunciation: [raˈul roˈðɾiɣeθ]; born 22 September 1987) is a Spanish former professional footballer who played as a central defender.

He played 92 matches for Espanyol, and subsequently competed in the United States, China and Kuwait.

== Club career ==
=== Espanyol ===
Born in Barcelona, Catalonia, Rodríguez made his professional debut with UDA Gramenet, going on to play three full Segunda División B seasons with the team. In summer 2010 he signed for neighbouring RCD Espanyol, being initially assigned to their reserves.

After Víctor Ruiz was sold in the 2011 January transfer window, and Juan Forlín suffered a serious injury, Rodríguez was propelled to the first team by manager Mauricio Pochettino. On 27 November 2010 he made his La Liga debut, coming on as a substitute for Dani Osvaldo in the last minute of a 3–2 away win against Atlético Madrid, and finished his first professional season with ten appearances, including eight starts.

Rodríguez was definitely promoted to the main squad on 1 August 2011. He renewed his contract with the club in June 2012, running until 2015.

On 8 January 2015, having been completely ostracised by new coach Sergio González, Rodríguez cut ties with the Pericos as his link was due to expire on 30 June.

=== Abroad ===
On 9 January 2015, Houston Dynamo of Major League Soccer announced they had signed Rodríguez. He made his debut for his new team on 8 March, being replaced in injury time of a 1–0 home win over the Columbus Crew. His first goal came on 26 April, in a 4–4 draw against Sporting Kansas City.

After leaving the United States, Rodríguez played for China League One pair Shanghai Shenxin F.C. and Meizhou Meixian Techand F.C. before signing for Al-Arabi SC of the Kuwaiti Premier League in 2019. He was signed for all three clubs by compatriot manager Juan Ignacio Martínez.

== International career ==
Rodríguez was never capped by Spain at any level. He played one match for the Catalonia representative side on 30 December 2011, a goalless draw with Tunisia at his club ground the Estadi Olímpic Lluís Companys, as a half-time substitute for Gerard Piqué.

== Career statistics ==
As of match played on 31 March 2018

Club	Season	League			Cup		Other		Total	
Club	Season	Division	Apps	Goals	Apps	Goals	Apps	Goals	Apps	Goals
Gramenet	2007–08	Segunda División B	28	0	0	0	—		28	0
Gramenet	2008–09	Segunda División B	23	1	0	0	—		23	1
Gramenet	2009–10	Segunda División B	32	2	1	0	—		33	2
Gramenet	Total		83	3	1	0	—		84	3
Espanyol	2010–11	La Liga	10	0	0	0	—		10	0
Espanyol	2011–12	La Liga	28	0	4	0	—		32	0
Espanyol	2012–13	La Liga	22	0	1	0	—		23	0
Espanyol	2013–14	La Liga	19	0	5	0	—		24	0
Espanyol	2014–15	La Liga	1	0	2	0	—		3	0
Espanyol	Total		80	0	12	0	—		92	0
Houston Dynamo	2015	Major League Soccer	27	2	1	0	—		28	2
Houston Dynamo	2016	Major League Soccer	25	1	2	1	—		27	2
Houston Dynamo	Total		52	3	3	1	—		55	4
Shanghai Shenxin	2017	China League One	28	3	6	0	—		34	3
Meizhou Meixian Techand	2018	China League One	3	0	0	0	—		3	0
Career total			246	9	22	0	0	0	268	9
