= Grégory Béranger =

French footballer (born 1981)

Personal information
- Full name: Grégory José Henri Beranger
- Date of birth: 30 August 1981 (age 45)
- Place of birth: Nice, France
- Height: 1.74 m (5 ft 9 in)
- Position: Left-back

Youth career
- Nice

Senior career*
Years	Team	Apps	(Gls)
2000–2003	Cagnes-sur-Mer		
2003–2005	Cannes	62	(0)
2005–2006	Racing Ferrol	39	(0)
2006–2008	Numancia	59	(0)
2008–2010	Espanyol	18	(0)
2009–2010	→ Las Palmas (loan)	18	(0)
2010–2011	Tenerife	25	(0)
2011–2013	Elche	31	(2)
Total		252	(2)
- * Club domestic league appearances and goals

Grégory José Henri Béranger (born 30 August 1981) is a French former footballer who played mainly as a left-back.

He spent the vast majority of his professional career in Spain, amassing Segunda División totals of 172 matches and two goals in representation of Racing de Ferrol, Numancia, Las Palmas, Tenerife and Elche. In La Liga, he appeared for Espanyol.

== Club career ==
Béranger was born in Nice. After starting out professionally with AS Cannes in the lower leagues he moved to Spain in 2005, playing three seasons in its Segunda División, two of those with CD Numancia. In 2007–08, he was one of the Soria team's most utilised players (37 matches, 3.313 minutes of action) as they returned to La Liga after a three-year absence.

On 16 May 2008, Béranger signed for RCD Espanyol who paid his buyout clause. He made his league debut on 30 August, playing the entire 1–0 home win against Real Valladolid. He also struggled with some injuries and, late into the campaign, was involved in a training incident with teammate Carlos Kameni.

Béranger returned to the Spanish second tier after 21 competitive games at the RCDE Stadium, being loaned to UD Las Palmas. In July 2010, one month shy of his 29th birthday, he was definitely released by Espanyol, resuming his career in the same league with CD Tenerife.

After retiring, Béranger remained in Spain and worked as a youth coach at his last club Elche CF.

== Honours ==
Numancia

- Segunda División: 2007–08

Elche

- Segunda División: 2012–13
