= Víctor Ruiz (footballer, born 1989) =

Spanish footballer

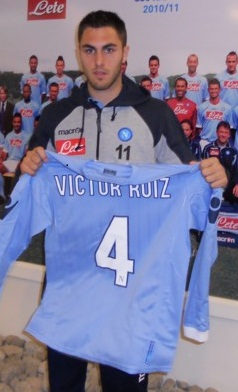
- Ruiz being presented by Napoli

Personal information
- Full name: Víctor Ruiz Torre
- Date of birth: 25 January 1989 (age 37)
- Place of birth: Esplugues de Llobregat, Spain
- Height: 1.84 m (6 ft 0 in)
- Position: Centre-back

Youth career
- 1998–2002: Barcelona
- 2002–2006: Cornellà
- 2006–2008: Espanyol

Senior career*
Years	Team	Apps	(Gls)
2008–2010	Espanyol B	44	(0)
2009–2011	Espanyol	37	(2)
2011	Napoli	6	(0)
2011–2015	Valencia	59	(1)
2014–2015	→ Villarreal (loan)	25	(0)
2015–2019	Villarreal	112	(3)
2019–2020	Beşiktaş	23	(0)
2020–2023	Betis	55	(2)
2023–2024	Espanyol	15	(0)
Total		376	(8)

International career
2006	Spain U17	1	(0)
2007–2008	Spain U19	3	(0)
2010–2011	Spain U21	5	(0)
2012	Spain U23	1	(0)
2010	Catalonia	1	(0)
- * Club domestic league appearances and goals

Víctor Ruiz Torre (Spanish pronunciation: [ˈbiɣtoɾ ˈrwiθ ˈtore]; born 25 January 1989) is a Spanish former professional footballer who played as a centre-back.

== Club career ==
=== Espanyol ===
Born in Esplugues de Llobregat, Barcelona, Catalonia, Ruiz arrived in Espanyol's youth system in 2006 at the age of 17, from neighbouring Cornellà. In the 2008–09 season, he made his senior debut, helping the reserve side to win their Tercera División group and subsequently promote in the playoffs.

Ruiz made his debut with the first team on 6 December 2009, starting and being booked in a 4–0 home loss against Racing de Santander. Coach Mauricio Pochettino fielded him in a further 21 La Liga games that campaign, with the team finally finishing 11th; he added two goals, against Málaga (2–1 away defeat) and Atlético Madrid (3–0, home).

=== Napoli and Valencia ===
In 2010–11, Ruiz played all the minutes for Espanyol in the first 15 rounds. On 31 January 2011, he was sold to Napoli for €6 million cash in a four-and-a-half-year contract, with the Italians also ceding the sporting rights to Jesús Dátolo who was playing with the Spaniards on loan.

Ruiz returned to his country on 30 August 2011, after signing a five-year deal with Valencia for €8 million. He made his official debut on 10 September, playing the full 90 minutes in a 1–0 home victory over Atlético Madrid.

On 12 December 2013, Ruiz was sent off in a 1–1 home draw against Kuban Krasnodar in the group stage of the UEFA Europa League, for a professional foul on Djibril Cissé.

=== Villarreal ===
On 1 July 2015, following a one-year loan there, Ruiz transferred to Villarreal also in the Valencian Community for an initial €2.7 million, potentially rising to €3 million. He played his first competitive match for them in his second spell on 23 August, when he started and finished the 1–1 draw at Real Betis.

Ruiz scored his first league goal for Villarreal on 7 April 2017, in a 3–1 home defeat of Athletic Bilbao where he also received his marching orders after a straight red card with 15 minutes left.

=== Beşiktaş and Betis ===
On 7 August 2019, Ruiz joined Beşiktaş on a three-year contract. He returned to the Spanish top flight one year later, however, with the free agent signing a one-year deal with Betis.

Ruiz agreed to an extension until 2023 at the Estadio Benito Villamarín on 4 June 2021; at its conclusion, he left. In between, he won the 2021–22 edition of the Copa del Rey for his first major honour, but contributed only three matches to this feat.

=== Return to Espanyol ===
On 20 September 2023, Ruiz returned to his first professional club Espanyol on a one-year deal.

== International career ==
Shortly after making his debut with Espanyol, Ruiz was called to the Spain under-21 team by manager Luis Milla. On 8 February 2011, in the last minutes of a 2–1 friendly win over Denmark, he was sent off for punching Nicki Bille, who celebrated his goal in front of Ruiz's face.

== Career statistics ==
Appearances and goals by club, season and competition
Club	Season	League			National cup		Continental		Total	
Club	Season	Division	Apps	Goals	Apps	Goals	Apps	Goals	Apps	Goals
Espanyol	2009–10	La Liga	22	2	0	0	—		22	2
Espanyol	2010–11	La Liga	15	0	3	0	—		18	0
Espanyol	Total		37	2	3	0	0	0	40	2
Napoli	2010–11	Serie A	6	0	0	0	1 (Note: Appearances in UEFA Europa League)	0	7	0
Valencia	2011–12	La Liga	22	0	7	1	8 (Note: Six appearances in UEFA Champions League, two appearances and one goal in UEFA Europa League)	1	37	2
Valencia	2012–13	La Liga	26	0	5	0	2 (Note: Appearances in UEFA Champions League)	0	33	0
Valencia	2013–14	La Liga	11	1	1	0	7	0	19	1
Valencia	Total		59	1	13	1	17	1	89	3
Villarreal (loan)	2014–15	La Liga	25	0	3	0	8	0	36	0
Villarreal	2015–16	La Liga	35	0	2	0	14	0	51	0
Villarreal	2016–17	La Liga	28	1	2	0	6 (Note: One appearance in UEFA Champions League, five appearances in UEFA Europa League)	0	36	1
Villarreal	2017–18	La Liga	27	2	2	0	5	0	34	2
Villarreal	2018–19	La Liga	22	0	1	0	10	0	33	0
Villarreal	Total		137	3	10	0	43	0	190	3
Beşiktaş	2019–20	Süper Lig	23	0	2	0	1	0	26	0
Betis	2020–21	La Liga	27	2	4	0	—		31	2
Betis	2021–22	La Liga	18	0	3	0	2	0	23	0
Betis	2022–23	La Liga	10	0	1	0	3	0	14	0
Betis	Total		55	2	8	0	5	0	68	2
Espanyol	2023–24	Segunda División	15	0	0	0	1 (Note: Appearance in La Liga play-offs)	0	16	0
Career total			332	8	36	1	68	1	436	10

== Honours ==
Espanyol B

- Tercera División: 2008–09

Betis

- Copa del Rey: 2021–22

Spain U21

- UEFA European Under-21 Championship: 2011

Individual

- UEFA La Liga Team of the Season: 2015–16
