= Cristian Gómez (footballer, born 1989) =

Spanish footballer

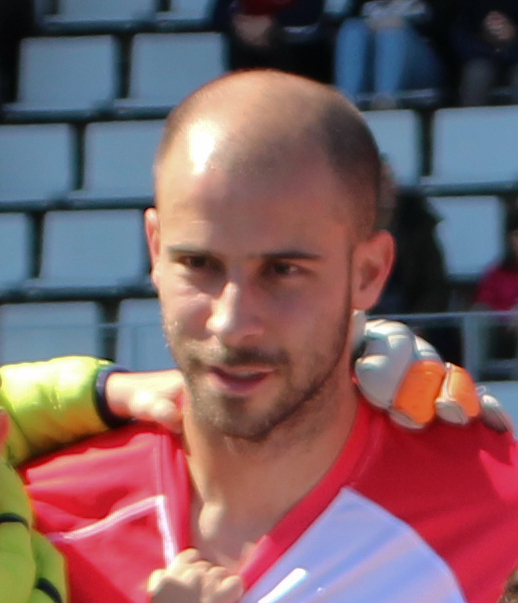
- Gómez with Hospitalet in 2019

Personal information
- Full name: Cristian Gómez García
- Date of birth: 27 July 1989 (age 37)
- Place of birth: L'Hospitalet, Spain
- Height: 1.86 m (6 ft 1 in)
- Position: Midfielder

Youth career
- 2006–2008: Hospitalet

Senior career*
Years	Team	Apps	(Gls)
2008–2011	Hospitalet	70	(3)
2011–2012	Espanyol B	14	(1)
2011–2015	Espanyol	36	(1)
2013–2014	→ Real Madrid B (loan)	11	(0)
2014–2015	→ Girona (loan)	8	(0)
2016	Hospitalet	13	(0)
2016–2017	Lleida Esportiu	26	(2)
2017–2023	Hospitalet	164	(9)
Total		342	(16)
- * Club domestic league appearances and goals

Cristian Gómez García (born 27 July 1989) is a Spanish former professional footballer who played as a central midfielder.

== Club career ==
Born in L'Hospitalet de Llobregat, Barcelona, Catalonia, Gómez began his career with his hometown club CE L'Hospitalet and made his senior debut there, appearing in two Segunda División B games in the 2007–08 season as his team eventually suffered relegation. He was essential in the subsequent promotion, then scored two goals from 25 appearances to help them to retain their status.

Gómez signed with RCD Espanyol in late March 2011, alongside teammate Christian Alfonso – the transfer being effective as of July – initially being assigned to the reserves. He made his first-team and La Liga debut on 20 November, playing 19 minutes in a 0–0 away draw against Real Sociedad. His only top-flight goal came on 15 April 2012, when he opened the 4–0 home win over Valencia CF.

On 23 August 2013, Gómez was loaned to Segunda División side Real Madrid Castilla with a buyout clause. The following summer, he joined Girona FC of the same league, also on loan.

Gómez terminated his contract with Espanyol on 31 August 2015, after his loan expired. Until his retirement, he competed solely in the lower divisions.
