= Carlos Kameni =

Cameroonian footballer (born 1984)

- Kameni with Cameroon in 2009

Personal information
- Full name: Idris Carlos Kameni
- Date of birth: 18 February 1984 (age 42)
- Place of birth: Douala, Cameroon
- Height: 1.86 m (6 ft 1 in)
- Position: Goalkeeper

Youth career
- 1995–2000: Kadji Sports

Senior career*
Years	Team	Apps	(Gls)
2000–2004	Le Havre	2	(0)
2002–2003	→ Saint-Étienne (loan)	0	(0)
2004–2012	Espanyol	222	(0)
2012–2017	Málaga	113	(0)
2017–2019	Fenerbahçe	9	(0)
2021–2022	Arta/Solar7	20	(0)
2022–2023	Santa Coloma	7	(0)
2023–2024	Antequera	4	(0)
Total		377	(0)

International career
1999	Cameroon U20	3	(0)
2000	Cameroon U23	3	(0)
2001–2019	Cameroon	71	(0)
Medal record
Representing Cameroon
Africa Cup of Nations
Winner	2002
Runner-up	2008
FIFA Confederations Cup
Runner-up	2003
Olympics
Gold medal – first place	2000
- * Club domestic league appearances and goals

Idris Carlos Kameni (born 18 February 1984) is a Cameroonian former professional footballer who played as a goalkeeper.

He spent the vast majority of his career in Spain, mainly with Espanyol for whom he appeared in 229 official games over eight La Liga seasons. He also competed professionally in France and Turkey.

A Cameroonian international before he was 20, Kameni represented the country in two World Cups and six Africa Cup of Nations tournaments.

== Club career ==
=== France ===
Born in Douala, Kameni was first spotted when, aged 16, he became the youngest footballer to win an Olympic gold medal, in 2000. This earned him a transfer to French club Le Havre AC but he was unable to break into the first team, and remained a reserve for the duration of his spell, also being loaned to AS Saint-Étienne and also failing to gain any playing time there. In 2001 he was linked with a move to Juventus FC, but nothing came of it.

Kameni almost joined Premier League's Wolverhampton Wanderers on a season-long loan for the 2003–04 season, but the deal collapsed after he was not granted a United Kingdom work permit.

=== Espanyol ===
20-year-old Kameni signed with Spanish side RCD Espanyol in July 2004 for US$600,000, and became first choice in his second year, winning the Copa del Rey as backup to Gorka Iraizoz, who started in La Liga. In the 2006–07 campaign, the opposite: Kameni was the starter, and Iraizoz was picked for the Catalans' UEFA Cup runner-up run. Early in 2006, the club suspended two fans for racist abuse towards the player.

In 2008–09, a tense season for Espanyol, which ranked in the bottom three for a lengthy period, Kameni had two incidents: first, he had a near-physical confrontation with a fan (who first insulted the player) after a training session in January, then fought with teammate Grégory Béranger again in training, in May. He still featured in 37 out of 38 league games, being essential to his team's survival, and also broke his compatriot Thomas N'Kono's record of minutes without conceding a goal, setting it at 498.

=== Málaga ===
After two more seasons as starter, Kameni was demoted to third choice for 2011–12, with Argentine Mauricio Pochettino still as Espanyol's manager. On 13 January 2012 he moved to Málaga CF, making his league debut on 25 March after replacing injured Willy Caballero during the first half of a 2–1 away win against his former team, and keeping a clean sheet during his time on the pitch.

Kameni became the starter after Caballero left for Manchester City. On 26 September 2015, in a game where Real Madrid registered 31 shots, he put on a Player of the match performance in a 0–0 draw at the Santiago Bernabéu Stadium. The following matchday, he became the first club goalkeeper to provide an assist in the Spanish top flight, as Charles scored the second of his three goals in the 3–1 home victory over Real Sociedad.

On 2 March 2016, Kameni scored a bizarre own goal in a 1–2 home loss to Valencia CF. Three days later, at Deportivo de La Coruña, he had to be replaced shortly before half-time due to injury, as the match went on to end 3–3.

On 19 November 2016, Kameni denied hosts FC Barcelona on several occasions, in a 0–0 draw.

=== Fenerbahçe ===
In July 2017, Kameni signed a three-year deal with Turkish club Fenerbahçe SK. He made his Süper Lig debut on 17 September, being booked late into a 4–1 away defeat of Alanyaspor.

Kameni left by mutual consent on 28 August 2019.

=== Later career ===
In April 2021, the 37-year-old Kameni came out of retirement to join Alex Song at Djiboutian club Arta/Solar7. He changed teams and countries again in August 2022, signing for UE Santa Coloma in the Andorran Primera Divisió.

Kameni returned to Spain on 28 October 2023, on a contract at Primera Federación side Antequera CF. He left the following January.

== International career ==
A Cameroon international since the age of 17, in a 0–0 friendly draw against South Korea on 25 May 2001, Kameni was part of the national team squads at the 2002, 2004, 2006 and 2008 Africa Cup of Nations, starting in all but the first. He was first-choice as his country finished second at the 2003 FIFA Confederations Cup, having already been selected for the tournament's previous edition.

In 2002, Kameni was picked for Cameroon's squad of 23 at the 2002 FIFA World Cup. He was named Best African Goalkeeper for 2006–07, after being runner-up the previous season.

Kameni was also chosen for the 2010 World Cup in South Africa, and was expected to start by many observers. However, he ended up on the bench as coach Paul Le Guen preferred Souleymanou Hamidou over him, and the national side was the first team to be eliminated from the tournament after losing all three group matches.

On 27 October 2015, more than two years after being left out of consideration for selection for "trying to orchestrate disorder", Kameni was called by new manager Volker Finke for a game against Niger for the 2018 World Cup qualifiers.

== Personal life ==
Kameni's older brother, Mathurin, was also a footballer and a goalkeeper.

== Career statistics ==
=== Club ===
Appearances and goals by club, season and competition
Club	Season	League			National cup (Note: Includes Copa del Rey, Turkish Cup)		League cup		Europe		Other		Total	
Club	Season	Division	Apps	Goals	Apps	Goals	Apps	Goals	Apps	Goals	Apps	Goals	Apps	Goals
Saint-Étienne (loan)	2002–03	Ligue 1	0	0	0	0	0	0	—		—		0	0
Espanyol	2004–05	La Liga	38	0	0	0	—		—		—		38	0
Espanyol	2005–06	La Liga	17	0	2	0	—		2	0	—		21	0
Espanyol	2006–07	La Liga	36	0	0	0	—		0	0	1	0	37	0
Espanyol	2007–08	La Liga	30	0	0	0	—		—		—		30	0
Espanyol	2008–09	La Liga	37	0	2	0	—		—		—		39	0
Espanyol	2009–10	La Liga	31	0	0	0	—		—		—		31	0
Espanyol	2010–11	La Liga	33	0	0	0	—		—		—		33	0
Espanyol	2011–12	La Liga	0	0	0	0	—		—		—		0	0
Espanyol	Total		222	0	4	0	—		2	0	1	0	229	0
Málaga	2011–12	La Liga	9	0	0	0	—		—		—		9	0
Málaga	2012–13	La Liga	3	0	6	0	—		1 (Note: Appearances in UEFA Champions League)	0	—		10	0
Málaga	2013–14	La Liga	0	0	1	0	—		—		—		1	0
Málaga	2014–15	La Liga	38	0	0	0	—		—		—		38	0
Málaga	2015–16	La Liga	28	0	0	0	—		—		—		28	0
Málaga	2016–17	La Liga	35	0	0	0	—		—		—		35	0
Málaga	Total		113	0	7	0	—		1	0	—		121	0
Fenerbahçe	2017–18	Süper Lig	9	0	5	0	—		2 (Note: Appearances in UEFA Europa League)	0	—		16	0
Fenerbahçe	2018–19	Süper Lig	0	0	0	0	—		—		—		0	0
Fenerbahçe	Total		9	0	5	0	—		2	0	—		9	0
Santa Coloma	2022–23	Primera Divisió	7	0	0	0	—		—		—		7	0
Career total			351	0	16	0	0	0	5	0	1	0	373	0

=== International ===
Appearances and goals by national team and year
Natioinal team	Year	Apps	Goals
Cameroon	2001	1	0
Cameroon	2002	1	0
Cameroon	2003	8	0
Cameroon	2004	9	0
Cameroon	2005	2	0
Cameroon	2006	4	0
Cameroon	2007	4	0
Cameroon	2008	13	0
Cameroon	2009	8	0
Cameroon	2010	6	0
Cameroon	2011	5	0
Cameroon	2012	6	0
Cameroon	2013	0	0
Cameroon	2014	0	0
Cameroon	2015	2	0
Cameroon	2016	0	0
Cameroon	2017	0	0
Cameroon	2018	1	0
Cameroon	2019	1	0
	Total	71	0

== Honours ==
Espanyol

- Copa del Rey: 2005–06
- UEFA Cup runner-up: 2006–07

Arta/Solar7

- Djibouti Premier League: 2021–22
- Djibouti Cup: 2022

Cameroon U23

- Summer Olympic Games: 2000

Cameroon

- Africa Cup of Nations: 2002; runner-up: 2008
- FIFA Confederations Cup runner-up: 2003

Individual

- Málaga Player of the Year: 2014–15
