= Joan Verdú (footballer) =

Spanish footballer

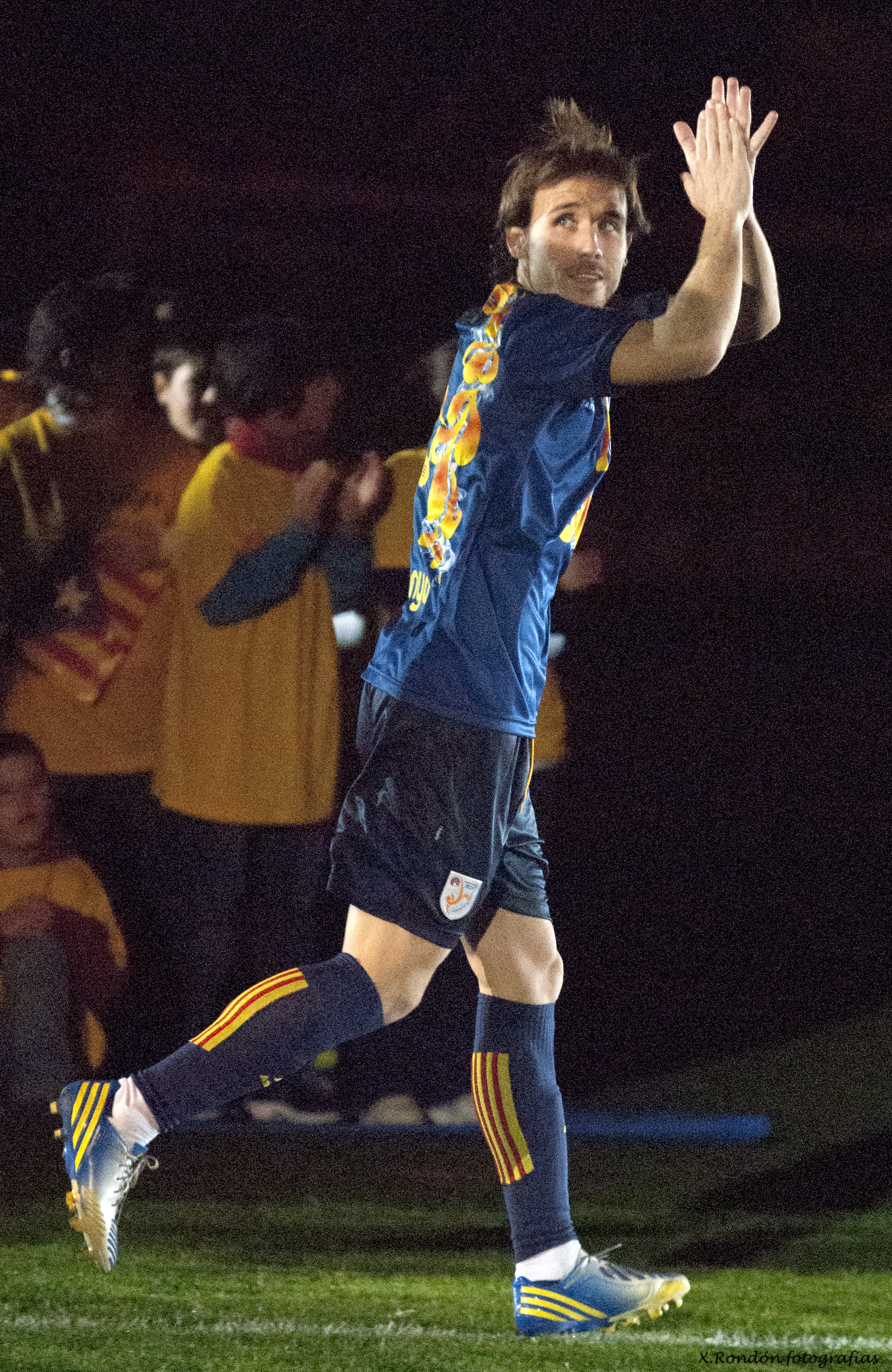
- Verdú playing for Catalonia in 2013

Personal information
- Full name: Joan Verdú Fernández
- Date of birth: 5 May 1983 (age 43)
- Place of birth: Barcelona, Spain
- Height: 1.76 m (5 ft 9 in)
- Position: Midfielder

Youth career
- 1988–1993: Poble Sec
- 1993–2002: Barcelona

Senior career*
Years	Team	Apps	(Gls)
2002	Barcelona C	19	(2)
2002–2006	Barcelona B	134	(31)
2004	Barcelona	0	(0)
2006–2009	Deportivo La Coruña	85	(9)
2009–2013	Espanyol	144	(23)
2013–2014	Betis	20	(2)
2014–2015	Baniyas	24	(10)
2015–2016	Fiorentina	5	(1)
2016	Levante	13	(1)
2017–2019	Qingdao Huanghai	66	(26)
2020–2021	Montañesa	24	(1)
2021–2022	Hospitalet	32	(1)
Total		566	(107)

International career
2002	Spain U20	2	(1)
2006–2016	Catalonia	11	(3)

Managerial career
- 2022–2023: Damm (youth)
- * Club domestic league appearances and goals

Joan Verdú Fernández (Spanish: [ɟʝoˈam beɾˈðu]; (Note: In isolation, Joan is pronounced [ɟʝoˈan].) born 5 May 1983) is a Spanish former professional footballer.

A versatile midfielder, adept at both central or attacking midfielder, he started professionally at Barcelona, but played mainly for local rivals Espanyol during his career, amassing La Liga totals of 262 games and 35 goals over nine seasons and also representing in the competition Deportivo, Betis and Levante.

== Club career ==
Born in Barcelona, Catalonia, Verdú was a product of FC Barcelona's youth system. He played mainly for its B side as a senior, making his debut with the main squad on 27 October 2004 in a 1–0 away loss against UDA Gramenet in the round of 64 of the Copa del Rey; his second and last appearance took place on 7 December, in a 2–0 defeat at FC Shakhtar Donetsk for the group stage of the UEFA Champions League.

Verdú moved to Deportivo de La Coruña for 2006–07, being relatively used by the Galicians throughout the season and scoring in a 2–0 away win over Villarreal CF on 11 February 2007. He produced similar numbers in his second year in La Liga.

Profiting from Juan Carlos Valerón's age and recurrent physical problems, Verdú had a breakthrough year in the 2008–09 campaign, often assuming the playmaking duties of the former while also adding seven league goals. However, after a new deal could not be agreed, the free agent moved back to his native region after three years, signing a four-year contract with RCD Espanyol.

Verdú netted against his previous team on 19 September 2009 in a 3–2 away victory, and started most of his first year, also benefitting from age and injury-related problems of another teammate, Iván de la Peña. Without any real competitor the following season – de la Peña only saw 30 minutes of action– he improved his numbers to 37 games and five goals, as the Pericos finished comfortably in midtable.

In summer 2013, free agent Verdú signed a four-year deal with another club in that tier, Real Betis. After suffering relegation, he went on to represent in quick succession Baniyas Club (United Arab Emirates), ACF Fiorentina (Italy) and Levante UD.

On 12 January 2017, the 33-year-old Verdú moved to the China League One with Qingdao Huanghai FC, where he shared teams with compatriot Martí Crespí. In November 2020, he returned to football at Nou Barris-based CF Montañesa of Tercera División, signing alongside his former Barcelona and Espanyol teammate Sergio García.

== Career statistics ==
As of match played on 3 November 2019

Club	Season	League			Cup		Other		Total	
Club	Season	Division	Apps	Goals	Apps	Goals	Apps	Goals	Apps	Goals
Barcelona	2004–05	La Liga	0	0	1	0	1 (Note: Appearances in UEFA Champions League)	0	2	0
Deportivo	2006–07	La Liga	27	1	6	1	—		33	2
Deportivo	2007–08	La Liga	24	1	1	0	—		25	1
Deportivo	2008–09	La Liga	34	7	2	0	4 (Note: Appearances in UEFA Cup)	1	40	8
Deportivo	Total		85	9	9	1	4	1	98	11
Espanyol	2009–10	La Liga	34	4	2	0	—		36	4
Espanyol	2010–11	La Liga	37	5	3	0	—		40	5
Espanyol	2011–12	La Liga	36	5	6	1	—		42	6
Espanyol	2012–13	La Liga	37	9	1	0	—		38	9
Espanyol	Total		144	23	12	1	—		156	24
Betis	2013–14	La Liga	20	2	3	1	7 (Note: Appearances in UEFA Europa League)	0	30	3
Baniyas	2014–15	Arabian Gulf League	24	10	7	1	—		31	11
Fiorentina	2015–16	Serie A	5	1	0	0	3	0	8	1
Levante	2015–16	La Liga	13	1	0	0	—		13	1
Qingdao Huanghai	2017	China League One	29	8	1	1	—		30	9
Qingdao Huanghai	2018	China League One	30	16	0	0	—		30	16
Qingdao Huanghai	2019	China League One	7	2	0	0	—		7	2
Qingdao Huanghai	Total		66	26	1	1	—		67	27
Career total			357	72	33	5	15	1	405	78

== Honours ==
Deportivo

- UEFA Intertoto Cup: 2008

Qingdao Huanghai

- China League One: 2019
