= Juan Forlín =

Argentine footballer

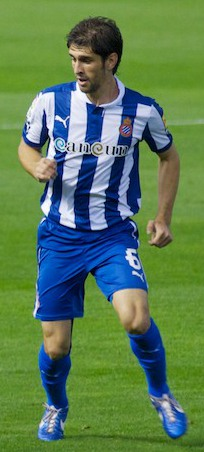
- Forlín in action for Espanyol in 2012

Personal information
- Full name: Juan Daniel Forlín
- Date of birth: 10 January 1988 (age 38)
- Place of birth: Reconquista, Argentina
- Height: 1.80 m (5 ft 11 in)
- Positions: Centre-back; defensive midfielder

Youth career
- Boca Juniors

Senior career*
| Years | Team | Apps | (Gls) |
| 2006–2009 | Boca Juniors | 37 | (3) |
| 2007 | → Real Madrid B (loan) | 0 | (0) |
| 2009–2013 | Espanyol | 106 | (2) |
| 2013–2015 | Al-Rayyan | 8 | (0) |
| 2014 | → Boca Juniors (loan) | 23 | (1) |
| 2015–2017 | Querétaro | 37 | (2) |
| 2017–2019 | Oviedo | 46 | (2) |
| 2020 | Júbilo Iwata | 0 | (0) |
| 2021–2022 | Llagostera | 32 | (0) |
| 2022 | Badalona Futur | 7 | (0) |
| 2023 | Badalona | 4 | (0) |
| Total | | 300 | (10) |
- * Club domestic league appearances and goals

Juan Daniel Forlín (born 10 January 1988) is an Argentine former professional footballer. Mainly a central defender, he could also play as a defensive midfielder.

He started out at Boca Juniors, then spent four years in La Liga with Espanyol, appearing in 118 official matches and scoring two goals.

== Club career ==
Born in Reconquista, Santa Fe, Forlín made his Primera División debut on 19 April 2008 as his team Boca Juniors won 2–1 against Newell's Old Boys. In his first full season, he was an undisputed starter as the Buenos Aires-based side claimed that year's Apertura.

Forlín was signed by RCD Espanyol from Spain on 25 August 2009 – alongside Boca teammate Facundo Roncaglia – on a five-year contract, with the Catalans paying a fee of €4 million for 70% of his rights. He made his La Liga debut on 12 September, in a 0–3 home loss to Real Madrid. He scored in his next appearance, a 3–2 away victory over Deportivo de La Coruña, and finished his debut campaign with 24 appearances, receiving 11 yellow cards and being sent off once.

During his spell with the Pericos, Forlín was regularly used by his compatriot Mauricio Pochettino as both a central defender and a defensive midfielder. The same befell him under Javier Aguirre, who was appointed in November 2012.

On 20 July 2013, Forlín moved to Qatar Stars League club Al-Rayyan SC for an undisclosed fee. He was released in July 2015.

== Honours ==
Boca Juniors

- Argentine Primera División: Apertura 2008

Querétaro

- Copa MX: Apertura 2016
