= List of RCD Espanyol seasons =

This is a list of seasons played by RCD Espanyol in Spanish and European football. Established in 1900, the seasons from the beginning of La Liga in 1928 to the most recent completed season are mentioned. It details the club's achievements in major competitions, and the top scorers for each season.

The club has never won the Liga but won the Spanish Cup four times.

== Key ==
Key to league record:

- Pos = Final position
- P = Played
- W = Games won
- D = Games drawn
- L = Games lost
- GF = Goals for
- GA = Goals against
- GD = Goal difference
- Pts = Points

Key to rounds:

- W = Winner
- F = Final
- SF = Semi-finals
- QF = Quarter-finals
- R16 = Round of 16
- R32 = Round of 32
- R64 = Round of 64
- R5 = Fifth round
- R4 = Fourth round
- R3 = Third round
- R2 = Second round
- R1 = First round
- GS = Group stage

Key to competitions

- Cup = Copa Del Rey
- Sup = Supercopa / Copa Eva Duarte
- CL = UEFA Champions League / European Cup
- UC = UEFA Europa League / UEFA Cup
- CW = UEFA Cup Winners Cup
- SC = UEFA Supercup
- CWC = FIFA Club World Cup

| Champions | Runners-up | Pichichi | CL | EL |

== Seasons ==
Seasons of RCD Espanyol
| Season | League | | | | | | | | | Cup | Other competitions | | Top scorer(s) | |
| Season | Division | Pos | Pld | W | D | L | GF | GA | Pts | Cup | Other competitions | | Player(s) | Goals |
|---|---|---|---|---|---|---|---|---|---|---|---|---|---|---|
| 1929 Details | La Liga | 7th | 18 | 7 | 4 | 7 | 32 | 38 | 18 | W | | | Rafael Oramas | 8 |
| 1929–30 | La Liga | 4th | 18 | 9 | 2 | 7 | 40 | 33 | 20 | SF | | | Martín Ventolrà | 12 |
| 1930–31 | La Liga | 9th | 18 | 6 | 2 | 10 | 32 | 45 | 14 | | | | Edelmiro | 11 |
| 1931–32 | La Liga | 6th | 18 | 7 | 1 | 10 | 34 | 39 | 15 | SF | | | Edelmiro | 10 |
| 1932–33 | La Liga | 3rd | 18 | 10 | 2 | 6 | 33 | 30 | 22 | SF | | | Redó José Garreta | 7 |
| 1933–34 | La Liga | 8th | 18 | 7 | 3 | 8 | 41 | 42 | 17 | QF | | | Francisco Iriondo | 18 |
| 1934–35 | La Liga | 8th | 22 | 9 | 2 | 11 | 47 | 59 | 20 | R6 | | | Francisco Iriondo | 15 |
| 1935–36 | La Liga | 9th | 22 | 8 | 1 | 13 | 36 | 53 | 17 | QF | | | Pitus Prat | 7 |
| 1936–39 | Spanish Civil War | | | | | | | | | | | | | |
| 1939–40 | La Liga | 5th | 22 | 11 | 2 | 9 | 43 | 43 | 24 | W | | | Gabriel Jorge Martínez Català | 11 |
| 1940–41 | La Liga | 7th | 22 | 10 | 2 | 10 | 50 | 54 | 22 | RU | Copa de Campeones | RU | Martínez Català | 21 |
| 1941–42 | La Liga | 9th | 26 | 10 | 6 | 10 | 49 | 42 | 26 | QF | | | Gabriel Jorge Antonio Chas | 12 |
| 1942–43 | La Liga | 11th | 26 | 9 | 6 | 11 | 45 | 51 | 24 | R16 | | | José Juncosa | 22 |
| 1943–44 | La Liga | 11th | 26 | 9 | 5 | 12 | 42 | 50 | 23 | QF | | | José Juncosa | 12 |
| 1944–45 | La Liga | 9th | 26 | 10 | 3 | 13 | 44 | 39 | 23 | SF | | | Ángel Calvo | 11 |
| 1945–46 | La Liga | 12th | 26 | 6 | 7 | 13 | 41 | 53 | 19 | R16 | | | Ángel Calvo | 16 |
| 1946–47 | La Liga | 11th | 26 | 9 | 1 | 16 | 46 | 59 | 19 | RU | | | Ángel Calvo | 25 |
| 1947–48 | La Liga | 8th | 26 | 9 | 6 | 11 | 39 | 47 | 24 | SF | | | Rosendo Hernández | 13 |
| 1948–49 | La Liga | 7th | 26 | 10 | 4 | 12 | 51 | 46 | 24 | SF | | | Josep Artigas | 14 |
| 1949–50 | La Liga | 11th | 26 | 8 | 6 | 12 | 42 | 64 | 22 | R16 | | | Rosendo Hernández | 14 |
| 1950–51 | La Liga | 12th | 30 | 13 | 4 | 13 | 82 | 72 | 30 | R1 | | | Francisco Marcet Julián Arcas | 18 |
| 1951–52 | La Liga | 7th | 30 | 14 | 4 | 12 | 69 | 62 | 32 | R1 | | | José Egea | 15 |
| 1952–53 | La Liga | 4th | 30 | 16 | 4 | 10 | 64 | 40 | 36 | QF | | | Julián Arcas | 23 |
| 1953–54 | La Liga | 4th | 30 | 14 | 6 | 10 | 50 | 36 | 34 | QF | | | Antonio Cruellas | 14 |
| 1954–55 | La Liga | 13th | 30 | 8 | 10 | 12 | 42 | 46 | 26 | | | | Julián Arcas | 8 |
| 1955–56 | La Liga | 7th | 30 | 14 | 3 | 13 | 50 | 56 | 31 | SF | | | Julián Arcas | 20 |
| 1956–57 | La Liga | 7th | 30 | 11 | 8 | 11 | 39 | 48 | 30 | RU | | | Juan Benavídez Julián Arcas | 8 |
| 1957–58 | La Liga | 8th | 30 | 11 | 6 | 13 | 48 | 46 | 28 | R16 | | | Carlos Torres | 12 |
| 1958–59 | La Liga | 7th | 30 | 11 | 7 | 12 | 42 | 45 | 29 | R32 | | | Óscar Coll | 11 |
| 1959–60 | La Liga | 8th | 30 | 11 | 8 | 11 | 33 | 29 | 30 | R32 | | | Índio | 9 |
| 1960–61 | La Liga | 10th | 30 | 12 | 3 | 15 | 46 | 46 | 27 | QF | | | Antonio Camps | 11 |
| 1961–62 | La Liga | 13th | 30 | 8 | 10 | 12 | 45 | 55 | 26 | QF | | | Antonio Camps | 15 |
| 1962–63 | Segunda División | 2nd | 30 | 17 | 5 | 8 | 40 | 24 | 39 | R1 | | | José Paredes | 10 |
| 1963–64 | La Liga | 13th | 30 | 10 | 5 | 15 | 34 | 47 | 25 | QF | | | Manuel Idígoras | 9 |
| 1964–65 | La Liga | 11th | 30 | 12 | 1 | 17 | 37 | 39 | 25 | R32 | | | Alfredo Di Stéfano | 9 |
| 1965–66 | La Liga | 12th | 30 | 7 | 10 | 13 | 31 | 48 | 24 | R16 | | | José Rodilla | 14 |
| 1966–67 | La Liga | 3rd | 30 | 15 | 7 | 8 | 50 | 40 | 37 | R32 | | | José María | 12 |
| 1967–68 | La Liga | 9th | 30 | 12 | 5 | 13 | 48 | 44 | 29 | R16 | | | José María | 12 |
| 1968–69 | La Liga | 15th | 30 | 8 | 8 | 14 | 29 | 36 | 24 | R16 | | | Cayetano Ré | 6 |
| 1969–70 | Segunda División | 3rd | 38 | 19 | 11 | 8 | 64 | 35 | 49 | R32 | | | Cayetano Ré | 17 |
| 1970–71 | La Liga | 11th | 30 | 8 | 9 | 13 | 18 | 25 | 27 | R32 | | | Cayetano Ré Daniel Solsona | 3 |
| 1971–72 | La Liga | 12th | 34 | 12 | 8 | 14 | 43 | 43 | 32 | QF | | | Juan Amiano | 19 |
| 1972–73 | La Liga | 3rd | 34 | 17 | 11 | 6 | 48 | 27 | 45 | R16 | | | Roberto Martínez | 15 |
| 1973–74 | La Liga | 9th | 34 | 13 | 8 | 13 | 34 | 38 | 34 | QF | UEFA Cup | R1 | Rafael De Diego | 15 |
| 1974–75 | La Liga | 11th | 34 | 14 | 5 | 15 | 38 | 47 | 33 | R32 | | | Daniel Solsona | 14 |
| 1975–76 | La Liga | 4th | 34 | 18 | 4 | 12 | 48 | 45 | 40 | QF | | | Carlos Caszely | 8 |
| 1976–77 | La Liga | 6th | 34 | 14 | 8 | 12 | 61 | 59 | 36 | SF | UEFA Cup | R16 | Marañón | 24 |
| 1977–78 | La Liga | 14th | 34 | 12 | 6 | 16 | 48 | 60 | 30 | R4 | | | Marañón | 18 |
| 1978–79 | La Liga | 8th | 34 | 15 | 5 | 14 | 37 | 46 | 35 | R3 | | | Marañón | 11 |
| 1979–80 | La Liga | 14th | 34 | 9 | 12 | 13 | 28 | 37 | 30 | R4 | | | Marañón | 17 |
| 1980–81 | La Liga | 10th | 34 | 14 | 6 | 14 | 37 | 42 | 34 | R2 | | | Marañón | 14 |
| 1981–82 | La Liga | 13th | 34 | 13 | 6 | 15 | 48 | 55 | 32 | R3 | | | Orlando Giménez | 11 |
| 1982–83 | La Liga | 9th | 34 | 13 | 6 | 15 | 45 | 47 | 32 | QF | Copa de la Liga | R2 | Marañón | 15 |
| 1983–84 | La Liga | 10th | 34 | 10 | 13 | 11 | 42 | 44 | 33 | R1 | Copa de la Liga | QF | Orlando Giménez | 12 |
| 1984–85 | La Liga | 8th | 34 | 11 | 12 | 11 | 40 | 44 | 34 | R4 | Copa de la Liga | SF | Michel Pineda | 19 |
| 1985–86 | La Liga | 11th | 34 | 11 | 9 | 14 | 43 | 40 | 31 | R4 | Copa de la Liga | R2 | Bartolomé Márquez | 13 |
| 1986–87 | La Liga | 3rd | 34 | 17 | 9 | 8 | 52 | 30 | 43 | R2 | | | Pichi Alonso | 17 |
| 1987–88 | La Liga | 15th | 38 | 11 | 11 | 16 | 44 | 55 | 33 | R16 | UEFA Cup | RU | Sebastián Losada | 11 |
| 1988–89 | La Liga | 17th | 38 | 7 | 16 | 15 | 29 | 44 | 30 | R16 | | | Michel Pineda | 5 |
| 1989–90 | Segunda División | 5th | 38 | 15 | 12 | 11 | 50 | 33 | 42 | R1 | | | Gabino | 13 |
| 1990–91 | La Liga | 16th | 38 | 12 | 10 | 16 | 39 | 47 | 34 | R16 | | | Wolfram Wuttke | 9 |
| 1991–92 | La Liga | 16th | 38 | 12 | 8 | 18 | 43 | 60 | 32 | R5 | | | Xavier Escaich | 10 |
| 1992–93 | La Liga | 18th | 38 | 9 | 11 | 18 | 40 | 56 | 29 | R4 | | | Xavier Escaich | 12 |
| 1993–94 | Segunda División | 1st | 38 | 20 | 12 | 6 | 59 | 25 | 52 | R16 | | | Velko Yotov | 13 |
| 1994–95 Details | La Liga | 6th | 38 | 14 | 15 | 9 | 51 | 35 | 43 | R3 | | | Jordi Lardín | 12 |
| 1995–96 Details | La Liga | 4th | 42 | 20 | 14 | 8 | 63 | 36 | 74 | SF | | | Jordi Lardín | 21 |
| 1996–97 Details | La Liga | 12th | 42 | 14 | 9 | 19 | 51 | 57 | 51 | QF | UEFA Cup | R2 | Nicolas Ouédec | 11 |
| 1997–98 Details | La Liga | 10th | 38 | 12 | 17 | 9 | 44 | 31 | 53 | R2 | | | Juan Esnáider | 13 |
| 1998–99 Details | La Liga | 7th | 38 | 16 | 13 | 9 | 49 | 38 | 61 | QF | | | Raúl Tamudo | 10 |
| 1999–2000 Details | La Liga | 14th | 38 | 12 | 11 | 15 | 51 | 48 | 47 | W | | | Raúl Tamudo | 11 |
| 2000–01 Details | La Liga | 9th | 38 | 14 | 8 | 16 | 46 | 44 | 50 | QF | Supercopa | RU | Raúl Tamudo | 13 |
| 2000–01 Details | La Liga | 9th | 38 | 14 | 8 | 16 | 46 | 44 | 50 | QF | UEFA Cup | R32 | Raúl Tamudo | 13 |
| 2001–02 Details | La Liga | 14th | 38 | 13 | 8 | 17 | 47 | 56 | 47 | R1 | | | Raúl Tamudo | 17 |
| 2002–03 Details | La Liga | 17th | 38 | 10 | 13 | 15 | 48 | 54 | 43 | R1 | | | Savo Milošević | 12 |
| 2003–04 Details | La Liga | 16th | 38 | 13 | 4 | 21 | 48 | 64 | 43 | R32 | | | Raúl Tamudo | 19 |
| 2004–05 Details | La Liga | 5th | 38 | 17 | 10 | 11 | 54 | 46 | 61 | R2 | | | Maxi Rodríguez | 15 |
| 2005–06 Details | La Liga | 15th | 38 | 10 | 11 | 17 | 36 | 56 | 41 | W | UEFA Cup | R32 | Luis García Raúl Tamudo | 10 |
| 2006–07 Details | La Liga | 11th | 38 | 12 | 13 | 13 | 46 | 53 | 49 | R32 | Supercopa | RU | Walter Pandiani | 18 |
| 2006–07 Details | La Liga | 11th | 38 | 12 | 13 | 13 | 46 | 53 | 49 | R32 | UEFA Cup | RU | Walter Pandiani | 18 |
| 2007–08 Details | La Liga | 12th | 38 | 13 | 9 | 16 | 43 | 53 | 48 | R16 | | | Luis García | 15 |
| 2008–09 Details | La Liga | 10th | 38 | 12 | 11 | 15 | 46 | 49 | 47 | QF | | | Román | 7 |
| 2009–10 Details | La Liga | 11th | 38 | 11 | 11 | 16 | 29 | 46 | 44 | R32 | | | Pablo Osvaldo | 7 |
| 2010–11 Details | La Liga | 8th | 38 | 15 | 4 | 19 | 46 | 55 | 49 | R16 | | | Pablo Osvaldo | 14 |
| 2011–12 Details | La Liga | 14th | 38 | 12 | 10 | 16 | 46 | 56 | 46 | QF | | | Álvaro | 10 |
| 2012–13 Details | La Liga | 13th | 38 | 11 | 11 | 16 | 43 | 52 | 44 | R32 | | | Joan Verdú | 9 |
| 2013–14 Details | La Liga | 14th | 38 | 11 | 9 | 18 | 41 | 51 | 42 | QF | | | Sergio García | 13 |
| 2014–15 Details | La Liga | 10th | 38 | 13 | 10 | 15 | 47 | 51 | 49 | SF | | | Sergio García | 14 |
| 2015–16 Details | La Liga | 13th | 38 | 12 | 7 | 19 | 40 | 74 | 43 | R16 | | | Felipe Caicedo | 10 |
| 2016–17 Details | La Liga | 8th | 38 | 15 | 11 | 12 | 49 | 50 | 56 | R32 | | | Gerard Moreno | 13 |
| 2017–18 Details | La Liga | 11th | 38 | 12 | 13 | 13 | 36 | 42 | 49 | QF | | | Gerard Moreno | 16 |
| 2018–19 Details | La Liga | 7th | 38 | 14 | 11 | 13 | 48 | 50 | 53 | QF | | | Borja Iglesias | 20 |
| 2019–20 Details | La Liga | 20th | 38 | 5 | 10 | 23 | 27 | 58 | 25 | R32 | Europa League | R32 | Facundo Ferreyra Wu Lei | 8 |
| 2020–21 Details | Segunda División | 1st | 42 | 24 | 10 | 8 | 71 | 28 | 82 | R32 | | | Raúl de Tomás | 23 |
| 2021–22 Details | La Liga | 14th | 38 | 10 | 12 | 16 | 40 | 53 | 42 | R16 | | | Raúl de Tomás | 17 |
| 2022–23 Details | La Liga | 19th | 38 | 8 | 13 | 17 | 52 | 69 | 37 | R16 | | | Joselu | 17 |
| 2023–24 Details | Segunda División | 4th | 42 | 17 | 18 | 7 | 59 | 40 | 69 | R32 | | | Martin Braithwaite | 22 |
| 2024–25 Details | La Liga | 14th | 38 | 11 | 9 | 18 | 40 | 51 | 42 | R2 | | | Javi Puado | 12 |
| 2025–26 Details | La Liga | 11th | 38 | 12 | 10 | 16 | 43 | 55 | 46 | R2 | | | Kike García | 10 |
