= 1996–97 RCD Espanyol season =

RCD Espanyol
1996–97 season
- President: Francisco Perelló
- Head coach: Pepe Carcelén (to 12 January); Vicente Miera (13 January to 14 March); Paco Flores (from 15 March)
- Stadium: Sarrià Stadium
- La Liga: 12th
- Copa del Rey: Quarter-finals
- UEFA Cup: Second round

The 1996–97 season was the 97th season in the history of RCD Espanyol and the club's third consecutive season in the top flight of Spanish football. In addition to the domestic league, Espanyol participated in this season's edition of the Copa del Rey and UEFA Cup.

== First-team squad ==
Note: Flags indicate national team as defined under FIFA eligibility rules; some limited exceptions apply. Players may hold more than one non-FIFA nationality.

| No. | Pos. | Nation | Player |
|---|---|---|---|
| 1 | GK | ESP | Toni Jiménez |
| 2 | DF | ESP | Cristóbal |
| 3 | DF | ESP | Víctor Torres Mestre |
| 4 | DF | ESP | Sebastián Herrera |
| 5 | DF | ARG | Mauricio Pochettino |
| 6 | MF | ESP | Adolfo Aldana |
| 7 | MF | ESP | Alberto Toril |
| 8 | MF | ESP | Luis Cembranos |
| 9 | FW | FRA | Nicolas Ouédec |
| 10 | MF | YUG | Branko Brnović |
| 11 | FW | ESP | Jordi Lardín |
| 12 | MF | CRO | Nenad Pralija |
| 13 | GK | ESP | Raúl Arribas |
| 14 | MF | ESP | Àlex Fernández |
| 14 | GK | FRA | Pascal Olmeta |
| 15 | MF | YUG | Goran Bogdanović |
| 16 | MF | ARG | Favio Fernández |

| No. | Pos. | Nation | Player |
|---|---|---|---|
| 16 | FW | ROU | Florin Răducioiu |
| 17 | MF | ESP | Pacheta |
| 18 | DF | ESP | Nando |
| 19 | MF | ESP | Arteaga |
| 20 | FW | PAR | Miguel Ángel Benítez |
| 21 | DF | ESP | Miguel |
| 21 | MF | BEL | Dominique Lemoine |
| 22 | FW | ESP | Javi García |
| 23 | DF | ESP | Jaime Molina |
| 23 | MF | YUG | Miodrag Anđelković |
| 24 | MF | ESP | Francisco (captain) |
| 25 | DF | FRA | José Cobos |
| 26 | MF | ESP | Ángel Morales |
| 28 | DF | ESP | Toni Soldevilla |
| 29 | FW | ESP | Raúl Tamudo |
| — | DF | ESP | Pedro Nieto |

== Competitions ==
=== Overall record ===
| Competition | First match | Last match | Starting round | Final position | Record | | | | | | | |
| Competition | First match | Last match | Starting round | Final position | Pld | W | D | L | GF | GA | GD | Win % |
|---|---|---|---|---|---|---|---|---|---|---|---|---|
| La Liga | 2 September 1996 | 21 June 1997 | Matchday 1 | 12th | 42 | 14 | 9 | 19 | 51 | 57 | −6 | 33.33 |
| Copa del Rey | 8 January 1997 | 12 March 1997 | Third round | Quarter-finals | 6 | 1 | 5 | 0 | 9 | 6 | +3 | 16.67 |
| UEFA Cup | 10 September 1996 | 29 October 1996 | First round | Second round | 4 | 2 | 1 | 1 | 4 | 5 | −1 | 50.00 |
| Total | | | | | 52 | 17 | 15 | 20 | 64 | 68 | −4 | 32.69 |

=== La Liga ===
==== League table ====
| Pos | Team | Pld | W | D | L | GF | GA | GD | Pts |
|---|---|---|---|---|---|---|---|---|---|
| 10 | Valencia | 42 | 15 | 11 | 16 | 63 | 59 | +4 | 56 (Note: VAL 2–1 TEN; TEN 2–1 VAL) |
| 11 | Compostela | 42 | 13 | 14 | 15 | 52 | 65 | −13 | 53 |
| 12 | Espanyol | 42 | 14 | 9 | 19 | 51 | 57 | −6 | 51 |
| 13 | Racing Santander | 42 | 11 | 17 | 14 | 52 | 54 | −2 | 50 (Note: RAC: 9 pts; ZAR: 6 pts; SPG: 3 pts) |
| 14 | Zaragoza | 42 | 12 | 14 | 16 | 58 | 66 | −8 | 50 |

Source: LFP
Rules for classification: 1) points; 2) head-to-head points; 3) head-to-head goal difference; 4) head-to-head goals scored; 5) goal difference; 6) number of goals scored.

==== Matches ====
| Date | Venue | Opponent | Score |
|---|---|---|---|
| 2 September | H | Sporting de Gijón | 2–3 |
| 7 September | A | Barcelona | 1–2 |
| 15 September | H | Real Valladolid | 1–0 |
| 21 September | A | Athletic Bilbao | 2–2 |
| 28 September | H | Extremadura | 5–1 |
| 1 October | A | Real Madrid | 0–2 |
| 12 October | H | Celta de Vigo | 0–0 |
| 19 October | A | Deportivo de La Coruña | 0–2 |
| 23 October | H | Hércules | 2–1 |
| 26 October | A | Real Betis | 2–1 |
| 3 November | H | Rayo Vallecano | 0–0 |
| 10 November | A | Real Oviedo | 1–3 |
| 16 November | A | Atlético Madrid | 1–2 |
| 24 November | H | Racing de Santander | 0–0 |
| 1 December | A | Real Sociedad | 0–1 |
| 8 December | H | Real Zaragoza | 3–0 |
| 22 December | A | Tenerife | 1–5 |
| 5 January | H | Compostela | 0–2 |
| 12 January | A | Logroñés | 0–1 |
| 20 January | H | Sevilla | 1–0 |
| 25 January | A | Valencia | 1–1 |

| Date | Venue | Opponent | Score |
|---|---|---|---|
| 2 February | A | Sporting de Gijón | 3–4 |
| 9 February | H | Barcelona | 2–0 |
| 16 February | A | Real Valladolid | 1–2 |
| 19 February | H | Athletic Bilbao | 0–2 |
| 23 February | A | Extremadura | 0–3 |
| 3 March | H | Real Madrid | 0–2 |
| 9 March | A | Celta de Vigo | 2–2 |
| 15 March | H | Deportivo de La Coruña | 0–1 |
| 23 March | A | Hércules | 2–1 |
| 30 March | H | Real Betis | 0–0 |
| 6 April | A | Rayo Vallecano | 1–0 |
| 14 April | H | Real Oviedo | 2–0 |
| 17 April | H | Atlético Madrid | 0–0 |
| 20 April | A | Racing de Santander | 1–1 |
| 4 May | H | Real Sociedad | 3–0 |
| 11 May | A | Real Zaragoza | 0–1 |
| 18 May | H | Tenerife | 1–0 |
| 25 May | A | Compostela | 1–3 |
| 1 June | H | Logroñés | 5–1 |
| 15 June | A | Sevilla | 1–3 |
| 21 June | H | Valencia | 3–2 |

=== Copa del Rey ===
| Round | Opponent | Aggregate | First leg | | | Second leg | | |
| Round | Opponent | Aggregate | Date | Venue | Score | Date | Venue | Score |
|---|---|---|---|---|---|---|---|---|
| Third round | Sporting de Gijón | 6–3 | 8 January | H | 4–1 | 15 January | A | 2–2 |
| Round of 16 | Deportivo de La Coruña | 2–2 (a) | 28 January | A | 2–2 | 5 February | H | 0–0 |
| Quarter-finals | Las Palmas | 1–1 (a) | 27 February | A | 0–0 | 12 March | H | 1–1 |

=== UEFA Cup ===
| 10 September 1996 First round First leg | APOEL (Cyprus) | 2–2 | (Spain) Espanyol | Nicosia |
| | Alexandrou 26'; Sotiriou 55' | Report | Benítez 30'; Ouédec 45' | Stadium: GSP Stadium; Attendance: 12,000; Referee: Taras Bezubyak (Russia) |

| 24 September 1996 First round Second leg | Espanyol (Spain) | 1–0 | (Cyprus) APOEL | Barcelona |
| | Cristóbal 63' | Report | | Stadium: Sarrià Stadium; Attendance: 19,000; Referee: João Martins Pinto Correira (Portugal) |

Espanyol won 3–2 on aggregate.

| 15 October 1996 Second round First leg | Espanyol (Spain) | 0–3 | (Netherlands) Feyenoord | Barcelona |
| | | Report | van Gastel 22'; Taument 54'; Larsson 89' | Stadium: Sarrià Stadium |

| 29 October 1996 Second round Second leg | Feyenoord (Netherlands) | 0–1 | (Spain) Espanyol | Rotterdam |
| | | Report | Arteaga 9' | Stadium: De Kuip |

Feyenoord won 3–1 on aggregate.
