= 2000–01 Sporting de Gijón season =

Real Sporting
2000–01 season
- Chairman: Juan Manuel Pérez Arango
- Manager: Pepe Acebal
- Stadium: El Molinón
- Segunda División: 7th
- Copa del Rey: Round of 64
- Top goalscorer: Manel (11)
- Average home league attendance: 12,024

The 2000–01 Real Sporting de Gijón season was the third consecutive season of the club in Segunda División after its last relegation from La Liga.

== Overview ==
On 14 January 2001, just after beating Atlético de Madrid by 1–0, Vicente Cantatore resigned as manager. Pepe Acebal, in that time coach of the reserve team, replaced him until the end of the season.

== Squad ==
Note: Flags indicate national team as defined under FIFA eligibility rules; some limited exceptions apply. Players may hold more than one non-FIFA nationality.

No.	Pos.	Nation	Player
1	GK	ESP	Juanjo
2	DF	ESP	Pablo Amo
3	DF	ARG	Patricio Graff
4	DF	ESP	Isma
5	MF	ESP	Raúl Lozano
6	FW	ESP	José Luis Soto
7	MF	ESP	Mario
8	MF	ESP	David Cano
9	FW	MAR	Abdeljalil Hadda
10	MF	RUS	Igor Lediakhov
11	MF	ESP	Gustavo Cañizares
12	DF	ESP	Francesc Sànchez Jara
13	GK	ARG	Darío Passaggio

No.	Pos.	Nation	Player
14	DF	ESP	Iván Otero
14	GK	ESP	Juanjo Valencia
15	MF	ESP	Miguel Cobas
16	MF	URU	Álvaro Gutiérrez
17	FW	ESP	Monchu
18	DF	ARG	Germán Rivarola
19	FW	ESP	Rubén Suárez
20	FW	ESP	Alberto
21	MF	ESP	Vicente
22	DF	VEN	Álex Pereira
23	MF	ESP	Manel
24	FW	RUS	Dmitri Cheryshev

=== From the youth squad ===
Note: Flags indicate national team as defined under FIFA eligibility rules; some limited exceptions apply. Players may hold more than one non-FIFA nationality.

No.	Pos.	Nation	Player
27	FW	ESP	Nacho García
28	MF	ESP	Samuel
30	DF	ESP	Blin
31	MF	ESP	Antonio Cuartero
32	GK	ESP	Bruno

No.	Pos.	Nation	Player
33	MF	ESP	Juan
34	MF	ESP	Pablo Álvarez
37	DF	ESP	Borja Sánchez
37	FW	ESP	David Villa

== Competitions ==
=== Segunda División ===
==== Results by round ====
Round	1	2	3	4	5	6	7	8	9	10	11	12	13	14	15	16	17	18	19	20	21	22	23	24	25	26	27	28	29	30	31	32	33	34	35	36	37	38	39	40	41	42
Ground	H	A	H	A	H	A	H	A	H	A	A	H	A	H	A	H	A	H	A	H	A	A	H	A	H	A	H	A	H	A	H	H	A	H	A	H	A	H	A	H	A	H
Result	D	L	W	D	D	L	W	W	D	L	D	W	D	L	W	W	L	D	L	W	L	W	D	W	D	L	W	D	L	W	W	W	L	L	D	W	W	L	W	W	D	L
Position	10	16	10	9	10	14	12	8	10	12	13	10	11	12	10	7	9	9	12	7	11	8	9	6	8	12	8	9	10	8	8	7	7	7	8	7	7	7	7	7	7	7

Source: BDFutbol
A = Away; H = Home; W = Win; D = Draw; L = Loss

==== League table ====
Pos	Team	Pld	W	D	L	GF	GA	GD	Pts
5	Albacete	42	18	12	12	46	40	+6	66
6	Recreativo	42	15	20	7	45	29	+16	65
7	Sporting Gijón	42	17	12	13	55	49	+6	63
8	Levante	42	13	21	8	58	50	+8	60
9	Salamanca	42	17	8	17	51	48	+3	59

Rules for classification: 1st points; 2nd head-to-head points; 3rd head-to-head goal difference; 4th head-to-head goals scored; 5th goal difference; 6th number of goals scored; 7th Fair-play points

==== Matches ====
3 September 2000 1	Real Sporting	0–0	Universidad Las Palmas	Gijón
		Summary		Stadium: El Molinón; Referee: Eleicegui Uranga

10 September 2000 2	Tenerife	1–0	Real Sporting	Santa Cruz de Tenerife
	Hugo Morales 60'	Summary	Mario (red card) 42'; Rivarola (yellow card) (yellow-red card) 59'	Stadium: Heliodoro Rodríguez López; Referee: Tristante Oliva

17 September 2000 3	Real Sporting	2–0	Extremadura	Gijón
	Cheryshev 4'; Hadda 34'	Summary	Jesús Vázquez (yellow card) (yellow-red card) 68'	Stadium: El Molinón; Referee: Pérez Izquierdo

24 September 2000 4	Eibar	0–0	Real Sporting	Eibar
		Summary		Stadium: Ipurua; Referee: Moreno Delgado

1 October 2000 5	Real Sporting	2–2	Murcia	Gijón
	Nacho García 68'; Mario 73'; Pablo Amo (yellow card) (yellow-red card) 77'	Report	Loreto 9', 12'; Timpani (yellow card) (yellow-red card) 14'	Stadium: El Molinón; Referee: Téllez Sánchez

8 October 2000 6	Salamanca	2–1	Real Sporting	Villares de la Reina
	Pinilla 41'; Quique Martín 59'	Summary	Lozano 75'	Stadium: El Helmántico; Referee: Pino Zamorano

15 October 2000 7	Real Sporting	3–0	Sevilla	Gijón
	Cheryshev 14'; Sànchez Jara 80'; Soto 88'	Summary	Taira (yellow card) (yellow-red card) 77'; Fredi (red card) 77'	Stadium: El Molinón; Referee: González Vázquez

22 October 2000 7	Lleida	0–1	Real Sporting	Lleida
		Summary	Graff (yellow card) (yellow-red card) 72'; Pablo Amo 89'	Stadium: Camp d'Esports; Referee: Rubinos Pérez

29 October 2000 9	Real Sporting	2–2	Leganés	Gijón
	Vicente 4' (red card) 85'; Mario 42'	Report	Macanás 51'; Fede Marín 64'	Stadium: El Molinón; Referee: Navas Lasa

1 November 2000 10	Albacete	3–1	Real Sporting	Albacete
	Javi Guerrero 4', 59'; José 46'	Report	Mario 49'	Stadium: Carlos Belmonte; Referee: Paradas Romero

5 November 2000 11	Elche	2–2	Real Sporting	Elche
	Nino 50'; Iván Rocha 75'	Report	Soto 12'; Cheryshev 26'	Stadium: Manuel Martínez Valero; Referee: Rubio Iniesta

12 November 2000 12	Real Sporting	3–1	Getafe	Gijón
	Soto 19', 47'; Cheryshev 27'	Summary	Faizulin 78'	Stadium: El Molinón; Referee: Bello Rebolo

19 November 2000 13	Levante	1–1	Real Sporting	Valencia
	Tomàs 55'	Report	Cheryshev 80'; Pablo Amo (red card) 83'	Stadium: Ciutat de València; Referee: Pérez Izquierdo

26 November 2000 14	Real Sporting	0–1	Recreativo	Gijón
		Report	Xisco 3'; Soto (yellow card) (yellow-red card) 84'	Stadium: El Molinón; Referee: Muñoz Juste

3 December 2000 15	Jaén	0–2	Real Sporting	Jaén
		Summary	Rivarola 70', 89'	Stadium: La Victoria; Referee: Téllez Sánchez

10 December 2000 16	Real Sporting	5–2	Compostela	Gijón
	Lediakhov 17', 23'; Soto 28'; Adauto 73'; Hadda 81'	Summary	Anxo 4'; Gudelj 43'	Stadium: El Molinón; Referee: Eleicegui Uranga

17 December 2000 17	Real Betis	1–0	Real Sporting	Seville
	Arzu 28'	Summary	Graff (yellow card) (yellow-red card) 86'	Stadium: Manuel Ruiz de Lopera; Referee: Renales Galindo

20 December 2000 18	Real Sporting	1–1	Racing Ferrol	Gijón
	Lediakhov 14'	Summary	Razov 18'	Stadium: El Molinón; Referee: Román González

7 January 2001 19	Badajoz	2–0	Real Sporting	Badajoz
	Bracamonte 7'; Zafra 32'	Report		Stadium: Nuevo Vivero; Referee: Arcas Piqueres

14 January 2001 20	Real Sporting	1–0	Atlético Madrid	Gijón
	Soto 72'; Lediakhov (yellow card) (yellow-red card) 83'	Report	Hernandez (yellow card) (yellow-red card) 78'	Stadium: El Molinón; Referee: Pérez Lima

21 January 2001 21	Córdoba	2–0	Real Sporting	Córdoba
	Gallego 50'; Sívori 88'	Summary		Stadium: Nuevo Arcángel; Referee: González Vázquez

28 January 2001 22	Universidad Las Palmas	0–2	Real Sporting	Maspalomas
		Summary	Soto 9', 47'	Stadium: Municipal; Referee: Jávega Jiménez

4 February 2001 23	Real Sporting	0–0	Tenerife	Gijón
	Sànchez Jara (yellow card) (yellow-red card) 74'	Summary		Stadium: El Molinón; Referee: Paradas Romero

11 February 2001 24	Extremadura	1–2	Real Sporting	Almendralejo
	Mosquera 53'	Summary	Alberto 51'; Manel 78'	Stadium: Francisco de la Hera; Referee: Fernández Hinojosa

18 February 2001 25	Real Sporting	0–0	Eibar	Gijón
	Samuel (yellow card) (yellow-red card) 76'	Summary		Stadium: El Molinón; Referee: Valle Gil

25 February 2001 26	Murcia	5–0	Real Sporting	Murcia
	Zárate 68'; Aguilar 78' (pen.); Loreto 81', 89'; Torres 85'	Summary	Isma (red card) 77'	Stadium: La Condomina; Referee: Rubinos Pérez

4 March 2001 27	Real Sporting	2–0	Salamanca	Gijón
	Cheryshev 41'; Juan 60'	Summary	Cristian Díaz (red card) 58'	Stadium: El Molinón; Referee: Renales Galindo

10 March 2001 28	Sevilla	1–1	Real Sporting	Seville
	Fredi (red card) 44'; Nico Olivera 89'	Summary	Manel 44'; Graff (yellow card) (yellow-red card) 80'	Stadium: Ramón Sánchez Pizjuán; Referee: Teixeira Vitienes

18 March 2001 29	Real Sporting	1–2	Lleida	Gijón
	Alberto 70'	Summary	Fran 21', 84'	Stadium: El Molinón; Referee: Pérez Pérez

25 March 2001 30	Leganés	0–1	Real Sporting	Leganés
	Raúl Arribas (red card) 4'	Summary	Lediakhov 7' (pen.); David Cano (yellow card) (yellow-red card) 24'	Stadium: Butarque; Referee: Rodado Rodríguez

1 April 2001 31	Real Sporting	4–2	Albacete	Gijón
	Pablo Amo 35', 70'; Manel 61', 81'	Summary	Jesús Muñoz 23'; Manolo Pérez 85'	Stadium: El Molinón; Referee: Arcas Piqueres

8 April 2001 32	Real Sporting	2–1	Elche	Gijón
	Manel 4', 77'	Summary	Aitor Arregi 86'	Stadium: El Molinón; Referee: Román González

15 April 2001 33	Getafe	3–1	Real Sporting	Getafe
	Mariano Juan 18' (pen.); Faizulin 27', 80'	Summary	Manel 57'	Stadium: Coliseum Alfonso Pérez; Referee: Pino Zamorano

22 April 2001 34	Real Sporting	1–2	Levante	Gijón
	Manel 47'	Summary	Descarga 49'; Roa 77'	Stadium: El Molinón; Referee: Pérez Izquierdo

29 April 2001 35	Recreativo	1–1	Real Sporting	Huelva
	Bodipo 63'	Summary	Soto 18'; Valencia (red card) 67'	Stadium: Colombino; Referee: Moreno Delgado

6 May 2001 36	Real Sporting	1–0	Jaén	Gijón
	Manel 60'	Summary		Stadium: El Molinón; Referee: Bello Rebolo

13 May 2001 37	Compostela	1–2	Real Sporting	Santiago de Compostela
	Gudelj 83'	Summary	Alberto 32'; Lediakhov 52'	Stadium: San Lázaro; Referee: Navas Lasa

28 April 2001 38	Real Sporting	1–2	Real Betis	Gijón
	Manel 28'	Summary	Amato 8', 60'; Belenguer (yellow card) (yellow-red card) 52'	Stadium: El Molinón; Referee: Rodado Rodríguez

26 May 2001 39	Racing Ferrol	2–3	Real Sporting	Ferrol
	Pazolo 84'; Razov 88'	Summary	Pablo Álvarez 28'; Manel 56'	Stadium: A Malata; Referee: Eleicegui Uranga

3 June 2001 40	Real Sporting	1–0	Badajoz	Gijón
	Lediakhov 53'	Summary	Paquito (yellow card) (yellow-red card) 86'	Stadium: El Molinón; Referee: Téllez Sánchez

10 June 2001 41	Atlético Madrid	1–0	Real Sporting	Madrid
	Luque 69'	Summary	Isma (yellow card) (yellow-red card) 61'; Vicente (yellow card) (yellow-red card) 66'	Stadium: Vicente Calderón; Referee: Paradas Romero

17 June 2001 42	Real Sporting	2–2	Córdoba	Gijón
	Soto 56'; Cheryshev 75'	Summary	Manolo 47'; Quini 85'	Stadium: El Molinón; Referee: Pérez Lima

=== Copa del Rey ===
==== Matches ====
13 December 2000 Round of 64	Real Sporting	1–1 (4–5 p)	Las Palmas	Gijón
	Adauto 89'	Report	Guayre 39'	Stadium: El Molinón; Referee: Rodríguez Santiago

== Squad statistics ==
=== Appearances and goals ===
No.	Pos	Nat	Player	Total		Segunda División		Copa del Rey	
No.	Pos	Nat	Player	Apps	Goals	Apps	Goals	Apps	Goals
1	GK	(Spain) ESP	Juanjo	5	0	3+1	0	1+0	0
2	DF	(Spain) ESP	Pablo Amo	37	3	36+0	3	1+0	0
3	DF	(Argentina) ARG	Patricio Graff	37	0	36+0	0	1+0	0
4	DF	(Spain) ESP	Isma	24	0	24+0	0	0+0	0
5	MF	(Spain) ESP	Raúl Lozano	30	1	20+9	1	1+0	0
6	FW	(Spain) ESP	José Luis Soto	40	10	18+21	10	1+0	0
7	MF	(Spain) ESP	Mario	31	3	28+2	3	1+0	0
8	MF	(Spain) ESP	David Cano	27	0	25+1	0	1+0	0
9	FW	(Morocco) MAR	Abdeljalil Hadda	10	2	3+6	2	0+1	0
10	MF	(Russia) RUS	Igor Lediakhov	37	6	36+0	6	1+0	0
11	MF	(Spain) ESP	Gustavo Cañizares	2	0	1+1	0	0+0	0
12	DF	(Spain) ESP	Francesc Sànchez Jara	16	1	12+4	1	0+0	0
13	GK	(Argentina) ARG	Darío Passaggio	0	0	0+0	0	0+0	0
14	DF	(Spain) ESP	Iván Otero	1	0	1+0	0	0+0	0
15	MF	(Spain) ESP	Miguel Cobas	0	0	0+0	0	0+0	0
16	MF	(Uruguay) URU	Álvaro Gutiérrez	10	0	6+4	0	0+0	0
18	DF	(Argentina) ARG	Germán Rivarola	20	2	11+8	2	1+0	0
19	FW	(Spain) ESP	Rubén Suárez	19	0	10+8	0	0+1	0
20	FW	(Spain) ESP	Alberto	28	3	20+8	3	0+0	0
21	MF	(Spain) ESP	Vicente	24	1	17+7	1	0+0	0
22	DF	(Venezuela) VEN	Álex Pereira	8	0	5+2	0	1+0	0
23	FW	(Brazil) BRA	Adauto	12	2	3+8	1	0+1	1
23	MF	(Spain) ESP	Manel	19	11	19+0	11	0+0	0
24	FW	(Russia) RUS	Dmitri Cheryshev	38	7	31+6	7	1+0	0
25	GK	(Spain) ESP	Juan José Valencia	36	0	36+0	0	0+0	0
27	FW	(Spain) ESP	Nacho García	11	1	6+5	1	0+0	0
28	MF	(Spain) ESP	Samuel	13	0	13+0	0	0+0	0
30	DF	(Spain) ESP	Blin	22	0	19+3	0	0+0	0
31	MF	(Spain) ESP	Antonio Cuartero	1	0	1+0	0	0+0	0
32	GK	(Spain) ESP	Bruno	3	0	3+0	0	0+0	0
33	MF	(Spain) ESP	Juan	19	0	14+5	0	0+0	0
34	MF	(Spain) ESP	Pablo Álvarez	4	0	3+1	0	0+0	0
37	DF	(Spain) ESP	Borja Sánchez	3	0	2+1	0	0+0	0
37	FW	(Spain) ESP	David Villa	1	0	0+1	0	0+0	0
