= 1994–95 RCD Español season =

RCD Español
1994–95 season
- President: Francisco Perelló
- Head coach: José Antonio Camacho
- Stadium: Sarrià Stadium
- La Liga: 6th
- Copa del Rey: Third round
- Top goalscorer: League: Jordi Lardín (12); All: Jordi Lardín (12)

The 1994–95 season was the 60th season in the existence of RCD Español (renamed RCD Espanyol in February 1995) and the club's first season back in the top flight of Spanish football after promotion from the 1993–94 Segunda División. In addition to the domestic league, Español participated in this season's edition of the Copa del Rey.

== Players ==
=== First-team squad ===
Note: Flags indicate national team as defined under FIFA eligibility rules; some limited exceptions apply. Players may hold more than one non-FIFA nationality.

No.	Pos.	Nation	Player
—	GK	ESP	Raúl Arribas
—	GK	ESP	Toni Jiménez
—	DF	ESP	José Luis Gallardo
—	DF	ESP	Sebastián Herrera
—	DF	ESP	César Mendiondo
—	DF	ESP	Jaime Molina
—	DF	ARG	Mauricio Pochettino
—	DF	ESP	Víctor Torres Mestre
—	DF	ESP	Miguel
—	MF	ESP	Arteaga
—	MF	ESP	Enrique Ayúcar

No.	Pos.	Nation	Player
—	MF	YUG	Branko Brnović
—	MF	ESP	Luis Cembranos
—	MF	ESP	Francisco
—	MF	ESP	Jaume
—	MF	ESP	José Mari
—	MF	ESP	Pacheta
—	MF	ESP	Roberto
—	FW	BUL	Velko Yotov
—	FW	ESP	Jordi Lardín
—	FW	ESP	Lluís
—	FW	ROU	Florin Răducioiu

== Competitions ==
=== Overall record ===
Competition	First match	Last match	Starting round	Final position	Record							
Competition	First match	Last match	Starting round	Final position	Pld	W	D	L	GF	GA	GD	Win %
La Liga	4 September 1994	18 June 1995	Matchday 1	6th	38	14	15	9	51	35	+16	36.84
Copa del Rey	4 November 1994	11 November 1994	Third round	Third round	2	0	1	1	4	5	−1	0.00
Total					40	14	16	10	55	40	+15	35.00

=== La Liga ===
==== League table ====
Pos	Team	Pld	W	D	L	GF	GA	GD	Pts	Qualification or relegation
4	Barcelona	38	18	10	10	60	45	+15	46 (Note: BAR 1–1 BET; BET 1–1 BAR)	Qualification for the UEFA Cup first round
5	Sevilla (Note: On July 31, 1995, Sevilla and Celta Vigo were relegated to Segunda División B for not providing documentation (an audit) nor making their payments to the Royal Spanish Football Federation within the time limit. The two best qualified teams to be relegated, Albacete and Valladolid were readmitted to La Liga. Later, Sevilla and Celta Vigo claimed that according to the law they had another 15 working days because they made allegations days before. Finally, the solution was to not relegate any involved team and expand the league to 22 teams for the next two seasons.)	38	16	11	11	55	41	+14	43 (Note: SEV: 7 pts; ESP: 3 pts; ZAR: 2 pts)	Qualification for the UEFA Cup first round
6	Espanyol (Note: RCD Español was renamed RCD Espanyol in February 1995.)	38	14	15	9	51	35	+16	43	
7	Zaragoza	38	18	7	13	56	51	+5	43	Qualification for the Cup Winners' Cup first round (Note: Zaragoza was qualified directly for the 1995–96 UEFA Cup Winners' Cup as defending champions.)
8	Athletic Bilbao	38	16	10	12	39	42	−3	42	

Source: LFP
Rules for classification: 1) points; 2) head-to-head points; 3) head-to-head goal difference; 4) head-to-head goals scored; 5) goal difference; 6) number of goals scored.

==== Results summary ====
Overall								Home						Away					
Pld	W	D	L	GF	GA	GD	Pts	W	D	L	GF	GA	GD	W	D	L	GF	GA	GD
38	14	15	9	51	35	+16	57	11	7	1	35	9	+26	3	8	8	16	26	−10

==== Matches ====
Date	Venue	Opponent	Score
4 September	H	Real Oviedo	4–2
11 September	A	Real Valladolid	4–0
17 September	H	Barcelona	0–0
24 September	A	Deportivo de La Coruña	1–1
2 October	H	Celta de Vigo	0–0
9 October	A	Real Betis	1–3
15 October	H	Real Madrid	1–2
23 October	A	Logroñés	1–1
30 October	H	Albacete	5–1
6 November	A	Athletic Bilbao	3–1
20 November	H	Sporting de Gijón	1–1
27 November	A	Racing de Santander	0–0
4 December	A	Sevilla	0–3
11 December	H	Compostela	2–0
21 December	A	Real Zaragoza	0–1
8 January	H	Atlético Madrid	2–0
15 January	A	Valencia	0–0
22 January	H	Tenerife	0–0
29 January	A	Real Sociedad	0–2

Date	Venue	Opponent	Score
5 February	A	Real Oviedo	0–3
12 February	H	Real Valladolid	3–0
18 February	A	Barcelona	0–3
26 February	H	Deportivo de La Coruña	1–0
5 March	A	Celta de Vigo	2–1
12 March	H	Real Betis	0–0
19 March	A	Real Madrid	0–1
2 April	H	Logroñés	2–0
9 April	A	Albacete	1–1
16 April	H	Athletic Bilbao	3–1
23 April	A	Sporting de Gijón	0–0
30 April	H	Racing de Santander	2–0
7 May	H	Sevilla	2–2
14 May	A	Compostela	1–1
20 May	H	Real Zaragoza	2–0
28 May	A	Atlético Madrid	1–3
3 June	H	Valencia	5–0
11 June	A	Tenerife	1–1
18 June	H	Real Sociedad	0–0

=== Copa del Rey ===
Round	Opponent	Aggregate	First leg			Second leg		
Round	Opponent	Aggregate	Date	Venue	Score	Date	Venue	Score
Third round	Palamós	4–5	4 January	A	1–1	11 January	H	3–4

== Goalscorers ==
Rank	Player	La Liga	Copa del Rey	Total
1	(Spain) Jordi Lardín	12	0	12
2	(Romania) Florin Răducioiu	9	2	11
3	(Spain) Francisco	7	0	7
4	(Spain) Arteaga	6	0	6
5	(Spain) Roberto	5	0	5
6	(Spain) Lluís	4	0	4
7	(Federal Republic of Yugoslavia) Branko Brnović	2	0	2
7	(Spain) Pacheta	2	0	2
7	(Bulgaria) Velko Yotov	1	1	2
10	(Spain) Enrique Ayúcar	1	0	1
10	(Spain) José Mari	1	0	1
Own goals		1	1	2
Total		51	4	55
