= 1995–96 RCD Espanyol season =

RCD Espanyol
1995–96 season
- Chairman: Francisco Perelló
- Head coach: José Antonio Camacho
- Stadium: Sarrià Stadium
- La Liga: 4th
- Copa del Rey: Semi-finals
- Top goalscorer: League: Jordi Lardín (17); All: Jordi Lardín (21)

The 1995–96 season was the 61st season in the existence of RCD Espanyol and the club's second consecutive season in the top flight of Spanish football. In addition to the domestic league, Espanyol participated in this season's edition of the Copa del Rey.

== Players ==
=== First-team squad ===
Note: Flags indicate national team as defined under FIFA eligibility rules; some limited exceptions apply. Players may hold more than one non-FIFA nationality.

No.	Pos.	Nation	Player
1	GK	ESP	Toni
2	DF	ESP	Cristóbal
3	DF	ESP	Torres Mestre
4	DF	ESP	Sebastián Herrera
5	DF	ARG	Mauricio Pochettino
6	MF	ESP	Jaime Molina
7	MF	ESP	Alberto Toril
8	DF	ESP	Fernando Muñoz
9	FW	ROU	Florin Răducioiu
10	FW	PAR	Miguel Ángel Benítez
11	FW	ESP	Jordi Lardín
12	MF	YUG	Goran Bogdanović

No.	Pos.	Nation	Player
13	GK	ESP	Raúl Arribas
14	MF	ESP	Àlex Fernández
15	DF	ESP	Miguel
16	FW	ESP	Javi García
17	MF	ESP	Pacheta
18	MF	ESP	Francisco
19	MF	ESP	Arteaga
20	MF	YUG	Branko Brnović
21	FW	ESP	Ismael Urzaiz
22	GK	ESP	José Antonio Peraile
—	MF	ESP	Luis Cembranos

== Competitions ==
=== Overall record ===
Competition	First match	Last match	Starting round	Final position	Record							
Competition	First match	Last match	Starting round	Final position	Pld	W	D	L	GF	GA	GD	Win %
La Liga	3 September 1995	25 May 1996	Matchday 1	4th	42	20	14	8	63	36	+27	47.62
Copa del Rey	25 October 1995	28 February 1996	First round	Round of 16	10	4	3	3	18	13	+5	40.00
Total					52	24	17	11	81	49	+32	46.15

Source: Competitions

=== La Liga ===
==== League table ====
Pos	Team	Pld	W	D	L	GF	GA	GD	Pts	Qualification or relegation
2	Valencia	42	26	5	11	77	51	+26	83	Qualification for the UEFA Cup first round
3	Barcelona	42	22	14	6	72	39	+33	80	Qualification for the Cup Winners' Cup first round (Note: Since Atlético Madrid, winners of 1995–96 Copa del Rey, was qualified for the 1996–97 UEFA Champions League, losing cup finalists Barcelona earned a spot in the first round of the 1996–97 UEFA Cup Winners' Cup.)
4	Espanyol	42	20	14	8	63	36	+27	74	Qualification for the UEFA Cup first round
5	Tenerife	42	20	12	10	69	54	+15	72	Qualification for the UEFA Cup first round
6	Real Madrid	42	20	10	12	75	51	+24	70	

Source: LFP
Rules for classification: 1) points; 2) head-to-head points; 3) head-to-head goal difference; 4) head-to-head goals scored; 5) goal difference; 6) number of goals scored.

==== Results summary ====
Overall								Home						Away					
Pld	W	D	L	GF	GA	GD	Pts	W	D	L	GF	GA	GD	W	D	L	GF	GA	GD
42	20	14	8	63	36	+27	74	11	8	2	34	13	+21	9	6	6	29	23	+6

Source: La Liga

==== Results by round ====
Round	1	2	3	4	5	6	7	8	9	10	11	12	13	14	15	16	17	18	19	20	21	22	23	24	25	26	27	28	29	30	31	32	33	34	35	36	37	38	39	40	41	42
Ground	H	A	H	A	H	A	H	A	A	H	A	H	A	H	A	H	A	H	A	H	A	A	H	A	H	A	H	A	H	H	A	H	A	H	A	H	A	H	A	H	A	H
Result	W	W	W	W	W	L	D	W	D	D	W	W	W	D	L	W	W	D	L	W	L	D	W	D	D	D	L	W	L	W	L	D	D	W	D	W	W	W	W	D	L	D
Position	6	2	2	2	1	2	3	3	3	3	3	3	3	3	3	2	2	2	3	2																						

Source: La Liga
A = Away; H = Home; W = Win; D = Draw; L = Loss

==== Matches ====
3 September 1995 1	Espanyol	3–1	Salamanca	Barcelona
--:-- CEST (UTC+2)				Stadium: Sarrià Stadium

10 September 1995 2	Tenerife	1–4	Espanyol	Santa Cruz de Tenerife
--:-- CEST (UTC+2)				Stadium: Heliodoro Rodríguez López

17 September 1995 3	Espanyol	1–0	Albacete	Barcelona
--:-- CEST (UTC+2)				Stadium: Sarrià Stadium

24 September 1995 4	Real Sociedad	0–1	Espanyol	San Sebastián
--:-- CEST (UTC+2)				Stadium: Anoeta

1 October 1995 5	Espanyol	1–0	Racing Santander	Barcelona
--:-- CEST (UTC+2)				Stadium: Sarrià Stadium

5 October 1995 6	Atlético Madrid	2–1	Espanyol	Madrid
--:-- CEST (UTC+2)				Stadium: Vicente Calderón

8 October 1995 7	Espanyol	0–0	Sporting Gijón	Barcelona
--:-- CEST (UTC+2)				Stadium: Sarrià Stadium

14 October 1995 8	Sevilla	0–3	Espanyol	Seville
--:-- CEST (UTC+2)				Stadium: Ramón Sánchez Pizjuán

22 October 1995 9	Athletic Bilbao	0–0	Espanyol	Bilbao
--:-- CEST (UTC+2)				Stadium: San Mamés

29 October 1995 10	Espanyol	2–2	Celta Vigo	Barcelona
--:-- CEST (UTC+2)				Stadium: Sarrià Stadium

5 November 1995 11	Deportivo La Coruña	0–1	Espanyol	A Coruña
--:-- CET (UTC+1)				Stadium: Riazor

12 November 1995 12	Espanyol	2–0	Valladolid	Barcelona
--:-- CET (UTC+1)				Stadium: Sarrià Stadium

19 November 1995 13	Mérida	0–1	Espanyol	Mérida
--:-- CET (UTC+1)				Stadium: Estadio Romano

26 November 1995 14	Espanyol	1–1	Zaragoza	Barcelona
--:-- CET (UTC+1)				Stadium: Sarrià Stadium

2 December 1995 15	Rayo Vallecano	1–0	Espanyol	Madrid
--:-- CET (UTC+1)				Stadium: Campo de Fútbol de Vallecas

10 December 1995 16	Espanyol	3–1	Real Madrid	Barcelona
--:-- CET (UTC+1)				Stadium: Sarrià Stadium

17 December 1995 17	Oviedo	1–2	Espanyol	Oviedo
--:-- CET (UTC+1)				Stadium: Carlos Tartiere

20 December 1995 18	Espanyol	1–1	Real Betis	Barcelona
--:-- CET (UTC+1)				Stadium: Sarrià Stadium

4 January 1996 19	Barcelona	2–1	Espanyol	Barcelona
--:-- CET (UTC+1)				Stadium: Camp Nou

7 January 1996 20	Espanyol	2–0	Valencia	Barcelona
--:-- CET (UTC+1)				Stadium: Sarrià Stadium

14 January 1996 21	Compostela	2–1	Espanyol	Santiago de Compostela
--:-- CET (UTC+1)				Stadium: San Lázaro

21 January 1996 22	Salamanca	2–2	Espanyol	Villares de la Reina
--:-- CET (UTC+1)				Stadium: Helmántico Stadium

24 January 1996 23	Espanyol	2–1	Tenerife	Barcelona
--:-- CET (UTC+1)				Stadium: Sarrià Stadium

28 January 1996 24	Albacete	0–0	Espanyol	Albacete
--:-- CET (UTC+1)				Stadium: Estadio Carlos Belmonte

4 February 1996 25	Espanyol	0–0	Real Sociedad	Barcelona
--:-- CET (UTC+1)				Stadium: Sarrià Stadium

11 February 1996 26	Racing Santander	1–1	Espanyol	Santander
--:-- CET (UTC+1)				Stadium: Campos de Sport de El Sardinero

18 February 1996 27	Espanyol	0–2	Atlético Madrid	Barcelona
--:-- CET (UTC+1)				Stadium: Sarrià Stadium

=== Copa del Rey ===
==== Second round ====
25 October 1995 First leg	Extremadura	1–1	Espanyol	Almendralejo
--:-- CET (UTC+1)		Report		Stadium: Estadio Francisco de la Hera; Referee: José Japón Sevilla

8 November 1995 Second leg	Espanyol	3–1 (4–2 agg.)	Extremadura	Barcelona
--:-- CET (UTC+1)		Report		Stadium: Sarrià Stadium; Referee: José Andradas Asurmendi

==== Third round ====
29 November 1995 First leg	Leganés	0–1	Espanyol	Leganés
--:-- CET (UTC+1)				Stadium: Estadio Luis Rodríguez de Miguel

13 December 1995 Second leg	Espanyol	5–1 (6–1 agg.)	Leganés	Barcelona
--:-- CET (UTC+1)				Stadium: Sarrià Stadium

==== Round of 16 ====
11 January 1996 First leg	Espanyol	4–1	Real Madrid	Barcelona
--:-- CET (UTC+1)				Stadium: Sarrià Stadium

18 January 1996 Second leg	Real Madrid	2–1 (3–5 agg.)	Espanyol	Madrid
--:-- CET (UTC+1)				Stadium: Santiago Bernabéu

==== Quarter-finals ====
31 January 1996 First leg	Espanyol	0–0	Zaragoza	Barcelona
--:-- CET (UTC+1)				Stadium: Sarrià Stadium

14 February 1996 Second leg	Zaragoza	1–1 (3 (a)–3 agg.)	Espanyol	Zaragoza
--:-- CET (UTC+1)				Stadium: La Romareda

==== Semi-finals ====
22 February 1996 First leg	Barcelona	1–0	Espanyol	Barcelona
--:-- CET (UTC+1)				Stadium: Camp Nou

28 February 1996 Second leg	Espanyol	2–3 (2–4 agg.)	Barcelona	Barcelona
--:-- CET (UTC+1)				Stadium: Sarrià Stadium

== Statistics ==
=== Goalscorers ===
Rank	Player	La Liga	Copa del Rey	Total
1	(Spain) Jordi Lardín	17	4	21
2	(Spain) Ismael Urzaiz	13	2	15
3	(Paraguay) Miguel Ángel Benítez	6	0	6
Own goals		0	0	0
Total		63	18	81
