= 2000–01 RCD Espanyol season =

RCD Espanyol 2000–01 Season

RCD Espanyol
2000–01 season
- President: Daniel Sánchez Llibre
- Head coach: Paco Flores
- Stadium: Estadi Olímpic de Montjuïc
- La Liga: 9th
- Copa del Rey: Quarter-finals
- Supercopa de España: Runners-up
- UEFA Cup: Third round
- Top goalscorer: League: Raúl Tamudo (11); All: Raúl Tamudo (13)

The 2000–01 season was the 66th season in the existence of RCD Espanyol and the club's seventh consecutive season in the top flight of Spanish football. In addition to the domestic league, Espanyol participated in this season's edition of the Copa del Rey, Supercopa de España, and UEFA Cup.

== La Liga ==
Pos	Team	Pld	W	D	L	GF	GA	GD	Pts
7	Villarreal	38	16	9	13	58	52	+6	57
8	Málaga	38	16	8	14	60	61	−1	56
9	Espanyol	38	15	7	16	46	44	+2	52
10	Alavés	38	14	7	17	58	59	−1	49
11	Las Palmas	38	13	7	18	42	62	−20	46

Source: LFP
Rules for classification: 1st points; 2nd head-to-head points; 3rd head-to-head goal difference; 4th head-to-head goals scored; 5th goal difference; 6th number of goals scored; 7th Fair-play points

== Squad statistics ==
Updated on 18 January 2023

No.	Pos	Nat	Player	Total		La Liga		Copa del Rey		Supercopa		UEFA Cup	
No.	Pos	Nat	Player	Apps	Goals	Apps	Goals	Apps	Goals	Apps	Goals	Apps	Goals
1	GK	(Spain) ESP	Juan Luis Mora	42	0	35	0	0	0	2	0	5	0
2	DF	(Spain) ESP	Cristóbal	40	0	25+3	0	5	0	2	0	4+1	0
3	DF	(Argentina) ARG	Pablo Rotchen	27	2	22	2	3+1	0	0	0	1	0
4	DF	(Spain) ESP	Nando	14	0	10	0	0	0	2	0	2	0
6	MF	(Spain) ESP	Òscar	23	1	7+10	1	2+1	0	0+2	0	0+1	0
7	MF	(Spain) ESP	Toni Velamazán	41	7	25+5	6	6	1	2	0	2+1	0
8	MF	(Spain) ESP	Sergio González	52	6	38	4	6	0	2	0	5+1	2
9	FW	(Spain) ESP	Manuel Serrano	33	5	8+16	3	2+1	2	0	0	3+3	0
10	FW	(Paraguay) PAR	Miguel Ángel Benítez	4	0	0+4	0	0	0	0	0	0	0
11	FW	(Argentina) ARG	Martín Posse	47	5	23+11	4	3+3	0	2	0	4+1	1
13	GK	(Spain) ESP	Alfred Argensó	10	0	3	0	6	0	0	0	1	0
15	MF	(Romania) ROU	Constantin Gâlcă	44	6	32	3	4	1	2	0	6	2
16	MF	(Spain) ESP	Toni Soldevilla	26	1	16+1	0	6	1	0	0	3	0
17	MF	(Spain) ESP	Nan Ribera	6	0	2+1	0	0+1	0	0	0	0+2	0
18	DF	(Argentina) ARG	Mauro Navas	38	0	21+5	0	1+3	0	1+1	0	4+2	0
19	MF	(Spain) ESP	Arteaga	35	3	15+10	3	1+1	0	2	0	6	0
20	MF	(Spain) ESP	Ángel Morales	24	0	11+8	0	2+1	0	0	0	1+1	0
23	FW	(Spain) ESP	Raúl Tamudo	40	13	30	11	4+1	1	2	0	2+1	1
24	MF	(Spain) ESP	Roger	38	4	29	3	4	1	0	0	5	0
25	FW	(Japan) JPN	Akinori Nishizawa	8	0	2+4	0	1+1	0	0	0	0	0
27	DF	(Spain) ESP	David García	7	0	7	0	0	0	0	0	0	0
28	MF	(Spain) ESP	Iván Díaz	20	0	12+2	0	2+1	0	0+2	0	1	0
30	DF	(Spain) ESP	Alberto Lopo	14	0	13	0	1	0	0	0	0	0
35	FW	(Spain) ESP	Jordi Lardín	9	0	0+8	0	0+1	0	0	0	0	0
Players who have left the club after the start of the season:
	DF	(Argentina) ARG	Mauricio Pochettino	26	2	16	2	2	0	2	0	6	0
	DF	(Chile) CHI	César Santis	0	0	0	0	0	0	0	0	0	0
	DF	(Paraguay) PAR	Delio Toledo	24	1	11+5	1	5	0	1	0	1+1	0
	MF	(Spain) ESP	Quique de Lucas	12	0	3+5	0	0	0	0+1	0	3	0
	FW	(Spain) ESP	David Aganzo	0	0	0	0	0	0	0	0	0	0
	FW	(Spain) ESP	Manel	9	2	2+3	1	0+1	0	0	0	1+2	1
