= 1999–2000 RCD Espanyol season =

RCD Espanyol 1999–2000 Season

RCD Espanyol
1999–2000 season
- President: Daniel Sánchez Llibre
- Head coach: Miguel Ángel Brindisi (to 16 January); Paco Flores (from 19 January)
- Stadium: Estadi Olímpic de Montjuïc
- La Liga: 14th
- Copa del Rey: Winners
- UEFA Intertoto Cup: Third round
- Top goalscorer: League: Raúl Tamudo (10); All: Raúl Tamudo (11)

The 1999–2000 season was the 65th season in the existence of RCD Espanyol and the club's sixth consecutive season in the top flight of Spanish football. In addition to the domestic league, Espanyol participated in this season's edition of the Copa del Rey, which they won, and UEFA Intertoto Cup.

== La Liga ==
Pos	Team	Pld	W	D	L	GF	GA	GD	Pts	Qualification or relegation
12	Málaga	38	11	15	12	55	50	+5	48	
13	Real Sociedad	38	11	14	13	42	49	−7	47 (Note: ESP 0–0 RSO; RSO 1–0 ESP)	
14	Espanyol	38	12	11	15	51	48	+3	47	Qualification for the UEFA Cup first round (Note: Espanyol entered UEFA Cup as winners of 1999–2000 Copa del Rey.)
15	Racing Santander	38	10	16	12	52	50	+2	46	
16	Oviedo	38	11	12	15	44	60	−16	45 (Note: ROV 1–0 NUM; NUM 1–1 ROV)	

Source: LFP
Rules for classification: 1) points; 2) head-to-head points; 3) head-to-head goal difference; 4) head-to-head goals scored; 5) goal difference; 6) number of goals scored.

== Squad statistics ==
Updated on 28 January 2023

No.	Pos	Nat	Player	Total		La Liga		Copa del Rey		Intertoto	
No.	Pos	Nat	Player	Apps	Goals	Apps	Goals	Apps	Goals	Apps	Goals
1	GK	(Spain) ESP	Juan Luis Mora	19	0	12+1	0	6	0	0	0
2	DF	(Spain) ESP	Cristóbal	46	0	37	0	9	0	0	0
3	DF	(Argentina) ARG	Pablo Rotchen	19	1	14+2	1	2+1	0	0	0
4	DF	(Spain) ESP	Nando	28	1	20+2	1	5+1	0	0	0
5	DF	(Argentina) ARG	Mauricio Pochettino	36	1	29	1	7	0	0	0
7	MF	(Spain) ESP	Toni Velamazán	41	8	28+6	6	7	2	0	0
8	MF	(Spain) ESP	Sergio González	41	1	30+2	0	9	1	0	0
9	FW	(Spain) ESP	Manuel Serrano	36	5	6+18	3	4+6	2	2	0
10	FW	(Paraguay) PAR	Miguel Ángel Benítez	26	7	20+3	7	1+2	0	0	0
11	FW	(Argentina) ARG	Martín Posse	34	4	15+11	3	6+2	1	0	0
12	DF	(Paraguay) PAR	Delio Toledo	6	0	4	0	2	0	0	0
14	MF	(Spain) ESP	Quique de Lucas	37	4	19+11	4	3+4	0	0	0
15	MF	(Romania) ROU	Constantin Gâlcă	42	9	32	5	10	4	0	0
16	MF	(Federal Republic of Yugoslavia) YUG	Branko Brnović	1	0	0+1	0	0	0	0	0
17	DF	(Chile) CHI	César Santis	6	0	0+1	0	1+2	0	2	0
18	DF	(Argentina) ARG	Mauro Navas	41	0	27+6	0	5+3	0	0	0
19	MF	(Spain) ESP	Arteaga	46	5	34+3	4	7+2	1	0	0
21	MF	(Hungary) HUN	Balázs Molnár	8	0	1+3	0	2	0	2	0
22	FW	(Spain) ESP	Manel	16	4	1+12	2	3	2	0	0
23	FW	(Spain) ESP	Raúl Tamudo	40	11	30+4	10	5+1	1	0	0
24	MF	(Spain) ESP	Roger	40	6	18+12	4	9+1	2	0	0
25	GK	(Argentina) ARG	Pablo Cavallero	31	0	26	0	5	0	0	0
27	DF	(Spain) ESP	David García	4	0	0+1	0	3	0	0	0
29	MF	(Spain) ESP	Javi López	4	0	0	0	0+2	0	0+2	0
30	DF	(Spain) ESP	Alberto Lopo	9	0	6+1	0	2	0	0	0
31	DF	(Spain) ESP	Gerard Autet	5	0	0	0	3	0	2	0
32	MF	(Spain) ESP	Toni Soldevilla	10	0	6+1	0	3	0	0	0
35	MF	(Spain) ESP	Iván Díaz	3	0	1	0	0	0	2	0
40	DF	(Spain) ESP	David Català	1	0	0+1	0	0	0	0	0
	GK	(Spain) ESP	Salvador Balbuena	2	0	0	0	0	0	2	0
	DF	(Spain) ESP	Sergio Pelegrín	2	0	0	0	0	0	2	0
	MF	(Spain) ESP	Moisés Hurtado	1	0	0	0	0	0	1	0
	MF	(Spain) ESP	Fernando Núñez	1	0	0	0	0	0	0+1	0
	FW	(Spain) ESP	David Ávila	1	0	0	0	0	0	1	0
	FW	(Spain) ESP	Luis Blanco	2	0	0	0	0	0	1+1	0
	FW	(Equatorial Guinea) EQG	Jacinto Elá	1	0	0	0	0	0	0+1	0
Players who have left the club after the start of the season:
	DF	(Spain) ESP	Sergio Corino	4	0	2+2	0	0	0	0	0
	DF	(Spain) ESP	Pedro Nieto	2	0	0	0	0	0	2	0
	DF	(Spain) ESP	David Sánchez	2	0	0	0	0	0	2	0
	MF	(Spain) ESP	Manolo Pérez	2	1	0	0	0	0	1+1	1
	FW	(Argentina) ARG	Carlos Casartelli	9	0	0+5	0	2+2	0	0	0
