= Germán Tagle =

Chilean footballer

Personal information
- Full name: Germán Patricio Tagle Lara
- Date of birth: 8 January 1975 (age 51)
- Place of birth: Santiago, Chile
- Positions: Defensive midfielder; defender

Team information
- Current team: Chile U15 (assistant manager)

Youth career
- Club Flamenco

Senior career*
Years	Team	Apps	(Gls)
1998	Universidad de Concepción		(3)
1999	Magallanes	32	(4)
2000–2003	Unión Española	77	(5)
2004	Universidad Católica	5	(0)
2004–2005	Palestino	24	(1)
2007	Western Mass Pioneers	15	(0)

Managerial career
- 2007: Western Mass Pioneers (youth)
- 2010–2018: Club Flamenco
- 2017–2018: Magallanes (assistant)
- 2019–: Chile U15 (assistant)
- 2020: Chile U17 (assistant)
- 2023: Chile (assistant)
- * Club domestic league appearances and goals

Germán Patricio Tagle Lara (born 8 January 1975) is a Chilean football manager and former footballer who played as a defensive midfielder or defender for clubs in Chile and the United States. He is currently working in the Chile youth national teams.

== Club career ==
As a youth player, Tagle was with Club Flamenco from LAF (Liga Amigos del Fútbol) in Peñalolén, Santiago. At professional level, having played for both Universidad de Concepción and Magallanes in the Primera B de Chile, Tagle is better known by his stitn with Unión Española from 2000 to 2003 in the top division. In the same division, he after played for Universidad Católica in 2004 and Palestino in 2004–05.

Abroad, he played for American side Western Mass Pioneers in 2007 after training with SIFUP, the trade union of professional football players in Chile.

Following his retirement, he has played football at amateur level in clubs such as Unión Santa Emilia from Curacaví and Club Flamenco.

== Coaching career ==
A football manager graduated at the INAF (National Football Institute), he began his career with the Western Mass Pioneers youth system, at the same time he performed as a player.

From 2010 to 2018, he worked as coach at Club Flamenco from LAF (Liga de Amigos del Fútbol), serving also as assistant of Hugo Balladares in Magallanes in 2017–18.

From 2019 to 2021, he worked alongside Balladares as assistant in the Chile national team at both under-15 level and under-17 levels. Next, he joined the technical staff of Ariel Leporati in Chile U15. In November 2023, they assumed as interim assistants of Nicolás Córdova in the Chile senior team after Eduardo Berizzo left the team.

== Personal life ==
His father of the same name, Germán Tagle Santander, is a football coach and director and former player who has served for Club Flamenco for over fifty years.

As a player of Universidad de Concepción, he and his fellow footballers César Santis and Arturo Norambuena made up a rock band called Offside.
