= Vicente Fernández (disambiguation) =

Vicente Fernández (1940–2021) was a Mexican singer, actor and film producer.

Vicente Fernández may also refer to:

- Vicente Fernández (golfer) (born 1946), Argentine golfer
- Vicente Fernández (Chilean footballer) (Vicente Fernández Godoy, born 1999)
- Vicente (footballer, born 1975) (Vicente Fernández Pujante), Spanish footballer
