= Iván Díaz =

Iván Díaz may refer to:

- Iván Díaz (footballer born 1978)
- Iván Díaz (footballer born 1993)
