= 2000 Supercopa de España =

Espanyol	Deportivo La Coruña
0	2
- on aggregate

First leg
Espanyol	Deportivo La Coruña
0	0
- Date: 20 August 2000
- Venue: Olímpic Lluís Companys, Barcelona
- Referee: Juan Ansuátegui Roca
- Attendance: 16,800

Second leg
Deportivo La Coruña	Espanyol
2	0
- Date: 27 August 2000
- Venue: Riazor, A Coruña
- Referee: Manuel Mejuto González
- Attendance: 28,000

The 2000 Supercopa de España was a Spanish football competition, played over two legs on 20 August and 27 August 2000. It was contested by Espanyol, who were Spanish Cup winners in 1999–2000, and Deportivo La Coruña, who won the 1999–2000 Spanish League.

Deportivo La Coruña were the winners.

== Match details ==
=== First leg ===
20 August 2000
21:45 CET

Espanyol	0–0	Deportivo La Coruña

Olímpic Lluís Companys, Barcelona
Attendance: 16,800
Referee: Ansuátegui Roca

Espanyol	Deportivo

GK	1	(Spain) Juan Luis Mora
RB	2	(Spain) Cristóbal
CB	4	(Spain) Nando
CB	5	(Argentina) Mauricio Pochettino
LB	18	(Argentina) Mauro Navas	(yellow card) 89'
RM	7	(Spain) Toni Velamazán		(substituted off) 72'
CM	15	(Romania) Constantin Gâlcă
CM	8	(Spain) Sergio
LM	19	(Spain) Arteaga (c)		(substituted off) 72'
CF	11	(Argentina) Martín Posse		(substituted off) 54'
CF	23	(Spain) Raúl Tamudo
Substitutes:
MF	6	(Spain) Óscar		(substituted on) 54'
MF	28	(Spain) Iván Díaz		(substituted on) 72'
MF	14	(Spain) Enrique de Lucas		(substituted on) 72'
Manager:
(Spain) Paco Flores

GK	1	(Cameroon) Jacques Songo'o
RB	2	(Spain) Manuel Pablo
CB	4	(Morocco) Noureddine Naybet
CB	20	(Spain) Donato
LB	3	(Spain) Enrique Romero
DM	6	(Brazil) Mauro Silva
DM	24	(Federal Republic of Yugoslavia) Slaviša Jokanović
RM	18	(Spain) Víctor	(substituted off) 74'
AM	8	(Brazil) Djalminha	(substituted off) 78'
LM	10	(Spain) Fran (c)
CF	9	(Portugal) Pauleta	(substituted off) 56'
Substitutes:
FW	11	(Argentina) Turu Flores	(substituted on) 56'
MF	23	(Argentina) Aldo Duscher	(substituted on) 74'
FW	19	(Spain) Diego Tristán	(substituted on) 78'
Manager:
(Spain) Javier Irureta

=== Second leg ===
27 August 2000
21:45 CET

Deportivo La Coruña	2–0	Espanyol
Djalminha 57'; Tristán 60'

Riazor, A Coruña
Attendance: 28,000
Referee: Mejuto González

Deportivo	Espanyol

GK	13	(Spain) José Molina
RB	2	(Spain) Manuel Pablo
CB	4	(Morocco) Noureddine Naybet
CB	22	(Portugal) Hélder
LB	3	(Spain) Enrique Romero
DM	6	(Brazil) Mauro Silva
DM	24	(Federal Republic of Yugoslavia) Slaviša Jokanović	(yellow card) 35'	(substituted off) 83'
RM	18	(Spain) Víctor	(yellow card) 44'
AM	8	(Brazil) Djalminha		(substituted off) 80'
LM	10	(Spain) Fran (c)
CF	19	(Spain) Diego Tristán		(substituted off) 69'
Substitutes:
FW	17	(Uruguay) Walter Pandiani		(substituted on) 69'
FW	11	(Argentina) Turu Flores		(substituted on) 80'
DF	20	(Spain) Donato		(substituted on) 83'
Manager:
(Spain) Javier Irureta

GK	1	(Spain) Juan Luis Mora
RB	2	(Spain) Cristóbal	(yellow card) 49'
CB	4	(Spain) Nando	(yellow card) 83'
CB	5	(Argentina) Mauricio Pochettino
LB	12	(Paraguay) Delio Toledo	(yellow card) 51'
RM	7	(Spain) Toni Velamazán		(substituted off) 77'
CM	15	(Romania) Constantin Gâlcă
CM	8	(Spain) Sergio	(yellow card) 9'
LM	19	(Spain) Arteaga (c)
CF	11	(Argentina) Martín Posse		(substituted off) 65'
CF	23	(Spain) Raúl Tamudo		(substituted off) 65'
Substitutes:
MF	6	(Spain) Óscar		(substituted on) 65'
MF	28	(Spain) Iván Díaz		(substituted on) 65'
DF	18	(Argentina) Mauro Navas		(substituted on) 77'
Manager:
(Spain) Paco Flores

== See also ==
- 2000–01 La Liga
- 2000–01 Copa del Rey
- 2000–01 Deportivo de La Coruña season
- 2000–01 RCD Espanyol season
