= Pepe Carcelén =

Spanish footballer and manager

Personal information
- Full name: José Ródenas Carcelén
- Date of birth: 29 April 1955 (age 71)
- Place of birth: Albacete, Spain
- Position: Goalkeeper

Senior career*
Years	Team	Apps	(Gls)
- Albacete
1979–1980	Alicante		
- Albacete

Managerial career
- 1988–1989: Albacete
- 1994–1996: Espanyol (assistant)
- 1996–1997: Espanyol
- 1998–2002: Spain (assistant)
- 2002–2004: Benfica (assistant)
- 2004–2005: Real Madrid (assistant)
- 2007–2008: Benfica (assistant)
- 2009–2011: Osasuna (assistant)
- 2012–2013: China (assistant)
- * Club domestic league appearances and goals

José Ródenas Carcelén (born 29 April 1955) is a Spanish retired goalkeeper who later worked as a manager. As a player, he represented his hometown club, Albacete Balompié, and later began his managerial career with them in 1988. He spent two decades working as assistant manager to José Antonio Camacho, including spells with Espanyol (who Carcelén also managed in his own right), Benfica, Real Madrid and the national teams of Spain and China.

== Playing career ==
Carcelén was born in Albacete, the capital of the province of the same name in the autonomous community of Castilla–La Mancha, and played as a goalkeeper for Albacete Balompié. He was part of the team which won their Tercera División group and earned promotion to Segunda División B in 1981–82, and also played a key role as they won the Copa de la Liga Segunda División B in 1983. He left the club after making four appearances during the 1983–84 season.

== Coaching career ==
Carcelén was appointed as Albacete's manager ahead of the 1988–89 season, leading them to 12th place in Segunda División B. He left the club at the end of the season, being replaced by Julián Rubio. In 1994, he took up the position of assistant manager at La Liga side Español, working under José Antonio Camacho. At the start of the 1996–97 season, Camacho left to take over at Sevilla, and Carcelén was appointed in his place.

Espanyol were eliminated from the UEFA Cup by Dutch side Feyenoord on 29 October, and a 1–0 away loss to Logroñés at Estadio Las Gaunas on 12 January left them 16th in the table after 19 matches, only one point clear of the relegation places. Carcelén left the club, and was replaced by Vicente Miera. Miera lasted only nine matches, and was himself replaced by Paco Flores before the end of the season.

Carcelén was reunited with Camacho in September 1998, when the latter was appointed as head coach of the Spanish national team. The pair led the team to UEFA Euro 2000 and the 2002 FIFA World Cup, resigning after losing to South Korea in the quarterfinals of the latter tournament. They then moved abroad, with Camacho taking over at Portuguese club Benfica in December after the sacking of Jesualdo Ferreira. They spent two years at the club, winning the Taça de Portugal and finishing as Primeira Liga runners-up in 2003–04.

Camacho then resigned to take over at Real Madrid, replacing the sacked Carlos Queiroz, and Carcelén followed. After leaving Real the following year, the pair returned to Benfica in August 2007, with Camacho replacing Fernando Santos as manager. However, they resigned in March after a humiliating home draw with U.D. Leiria.

Carcelén joined up with Camacho once again in 2009 at Osasuna, with the pair ultimately being fired in February 2011 after a 1–0 away loss to Real Sociedad which left the club in the La Liga relegation zone. The pair returned to international management in August 2011 when Camacho took over as head coach of China, with this spell also ending in dismissal, after a shock 5–1 friendly defeat at the hands of Thailand in June 2013.

== Honours ==
=== Player ===
Albacete Balompié

- Tercera División: 1981–82
- Copa de la Liga Segunda División B: 1983

== Career statistics ==
=== As a player ===
As of 3 June 2021

Club	Season	League			Other		Total	
Club	Season	Division	Apps	Goals	Apps	Goals	Apps	Goals
Albacete Balompié	1982–83	Segunda División B	0	0	6	0	6	0
Albacete Balompié	1983–84	Segunda División B	4	0	0	0	4	0
Albacete Balompié	Total		4	0	6	0	10	0

1. Appearances in the 1983 Copa de la Liga Segunda División B

=== As a manager ===
As of 6 June 2021

Managerial record by team and tenure
Team	Nat	From	To	Record								Ref
Team	Nat	From	To	G	W	D	L	GF	GA	GD	Win %	Ref
Albacete Balompié	(Spain)	1988	1989	39	11	14	14	47	48	−1	28.21	
Espanyol	(Spain)	2 September 1996	12 January 1997	24	8	5	11	29	34	−5	33.33	
Career Total				63	19	19	25	76	82	−6	30.16	—
