= Julián Arcas =

Spanish guitarist & composer (1832–1882)

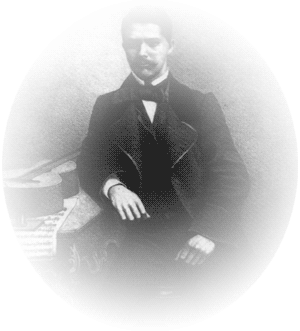
Julián Arcas

Julián Arcas (25 October 1832 – 16 February 1882) was a Spanish classical guitarist and composer, who influenced Francisco Tárrega and Antonio de Torres. He was "one of the most important figures in Spanish music in the 19th century".

== Biography ==
Arcas was born in María, Almería, and died in Antequera, Malaga. From 1860 until 1872, he performed all over Europe. The young Francisco Tárrega listened to him in 1863 in Castellón and played for him after the performance, on the request of Tárrega's father. Arcas then invited Tárrega to study with him in Barcelona. Between 1864 and 1870, Arcas performed all over Spain, in some of these appearances partnering with a pianist called Patanas, after which he retired to Almería, establishing a business in Calle Granada.

Arcas wrote fifty-two original works and transcribed thirty further pieces for the guitar, including waltzes, variations, preludes and dances. Thirty were published in Barcelona by Vidal y Roger and fifty in Madrid by Unión Musical Española.

Through the work of the guitar maker Antonio de Torres Jurado, Arcas influenced the development of the classical guitar, particularly with regard to the design of the soundboard.

== Bibliography ==
- Eusebio Rioja: Julián Arcas o los albores de la guitarra flamenca (Sevilla: Bienal de Arte Flamenco, 1990), ISBN 84-86773-20-2.
- Javier Suárez-Pajares: "Julián Arcas: Figura clave de la Guitarra Española", in: Actas del XV Congreso de la Sociedad Internacional de Musicología: Culturas musicales del Mediterraneo y sus ramificaciónes, vol. 4, (Madrid, 1992).
- Eusebio Rioja: "Julián Arcas Lacal (1832–1882), concertista internacional, compositor y maestro de guitarra", in: Revista velezana no. 12 (1993), p. 43–54.
- Melchor Rodríguez (ed.): Julián Arcas. Obras Completas para Guitarra / Guitar Works (Madrid: Soneto, 1993), ISBN 84-87969-38-0.
- Javier Suárez-Pajares, Eusebio Rioja Vázquez: El guitarrista almeriense Julián Arcas (1832–1882): una biografía documental (Almería: Instituto de Estudios Almerienses, 2003), ISBN 84-8108-273-2.

== Selected recordings ==
- Julián Arcas: Complete Guitar Music, performed by Gabriele Zanetti; 4-CD-set (Brilliant Classics 95639, 2020).
- Duo Imbesi Zangarà, Tocando en Dos works by Julian Arcas, Francisco Tarrega, Dionisio Aguado, players Carmelo Imbesi e Carmen Zangarà, Classical Music 3.0, 2022
