= Adauto (footballer) =

Brazilian footballer (born 1980)

Personal information
- Full name: Evandro Adauto da Silva
- Date of birth: 29 May 1980 (age 46)
- Place of birth: Santo André, Brazil
- Height: 1.77 m (5 ft 10 in)
- Position: Forward

Senior career*
Years	Team	Apps	(Gls)
1998–2000	Atlético Paranaense	5	(0)
2000–2001	Sporting Gijón	11	(1)
2002–2006	Slavia Prague	60	(14)
2006–2007	Ponte Preta		
2007	Sparta Krč		
2008–2010	MŠK Žilina	52	(17)
2011	Grêmio Prudente	22	(8)
- * Club domestic league appearances and goals

Evandro Adauto da Silva (born 29 May 1980) is a Brazilian former professional footballer who played as a forward for Atlético Paranaense, Slavia Prague and MŠK Žilina.

== Career ==
On 2 October 2008, Adauto scored the only goal in MŠK Žilina's 1–0 away win against Bulgarian side Levski Sofia to enable the team from Slovakia to reach the group stages of the UEFA Cup tournament with an aggregate score of 2–1.
