= José Luis Vegar =

Spanish footballer

Personal information
- Full name: José Luis Vegar Tebar
- Date of birth: 22 February 1975 (age 51)
- Place of birth: Alicante, Spain
- Height: 1.70 m (5 ft 7 in)
- Position: Midfielder

Senior career*
Years	Team	Apps	(Gls)
1994–1995	Alicante		
1995–1996	Benidorm	38	(2)
1996–2000	Recreativo	148	(14)
2000–2002	Albacete	73	(11)
2002–2003	Poli Ejido	22	(1)
2003–2005	Salamanca	62	(4)
2005–2007	Alicante	68	(7)
2007–2008	Logroñés	34	(8)
2008–2010	Huesca	66	(9)
2010	Jove Español		
2010–2011	Eldense	?	(3)
2011–2012	Alicante	?	(2)

Managerial career
- 2014–2015: Alcorcón (assistant)
- 2016–2017: Getafe (assistant)
- 2019: Hércules (caretaker)
- * Club domestic league appearances and goals

José Luis Vegar Tebar (born 22 February 1975) is a Spanish former footballer who played as a midfielder, and a manager.

== Club career ==
Vegar was born in Alicante, Valencian Community. During his extensive professional career, which brought him 293 appearances in the Segunda División, he represented Benidorm CF, Recreativo de Huelva, Albacete Balompié, Polideportivo Ejido, UD Salamanca, Alicante CF, CD Logroñés and SD Huesca. He scored the first of his 29 goals in the competition on 20 February 1999, as Recreativo lost 3–1 away against Málaga CF.

In the summer of 2010, aged 35 and having again contributed prominently as Huesca retained their second-tier status – 27 matches, two goals – Vegar signed for FC Jove Español San Vicente, a Tercera División club from San Vicente del Raspeig, moving close to home.

== Managerial statistics ==
As of match played 22 September 2019

Managerial record by team and tenure
Team	Nat	From	To	Record								Ref
Team	Nat	From	To	G	W	D	L	GF	GA	GD	Win %	Ref
Hércules (caretaker)	(Spain)	16 September 2019	23 September 2019	1	0	0	1	1	3	−2	0.00	
Total				1	0	0	1	1	3	−2	0.00	—
