= Germán Rivarola =

Argentine footballer

Personal information
- Full name: Germán Ezequiel Rivarola
- Date of birth: 18 April 1979 (age 47)
- Place of birth: Santa Eufemia, Argentina
- Height: 1.78 m (5 ft 10 in)
- Positions: Left back; midfielder

Team information
- Current team: Rosario Central (reserves manager)

Youth career
- Rosario Central

Senior career*
Years	Team	Apps	(Gls)
1996–2000	Rosario Central	75	(9)
2000–2001	Sporting Gijón	19	(2)
2001–2002	Rosario Central	42	(4)
2003	Pachuca	15	(0)
2003–2006	Rosario Central	80	(7)
2006–2011	Colón	115	(12)
2011–2013	Rosario Central	33	(1)

International career
1999	Argentina U20	15	(3)

Managerial career
- 2017–2018: Rosario Central (assistant)
- 2021–: Rosario Central (reserves)
- 2022: Rosario Central (interim)
- 2022: Rosario Central (interim)
- * Club domestic league appearances and goals

Germán Ezequiel Rivarola (born 18 April 1979) is an Argentine football coach and former player who played as either a left back or a midfielder. He is the current manager of Rosario Central's reserve team.

== Career ==
Born in Santa Eufemia, Córdoba, Rivarola started his professional career in 1996 with Rosario Central, in 1999 he was part of the Argentina Under-20 team that won the South American Youth Championship.

Rivarola had a season in Spain with Sporting de Gijón in 2000–2001, before returning to Rosario Central. In 2003, he played for Pachuca in Mexico, before returning once again to Rosario Central. In 2006, he joined Colón de Santa Fe.

== Honours ==
Season	Team	Title
1998	Argentina U-21	Toulón
1999	Argentina U-20	South American Youth Championship
