= Manuel Serrano =

Spanish footballer

Personal information
- Full name: Manuel Serrano Pulido
- Date of birth: 10 September 1972 (age 54)
- Place of birth: El Masnou, Spain
- Height: 1.72 m (5 ft 8 in)
- Position: Forward

Youth career
- Masnou
- –1990: Español

Senior career*
Years	Team	Apps	(Gls)
1990–1994	L'Hospitalet	93	(32)
1993	→ Deportivo Alavés (loan)	3	(1)
1994	→ Español (loan)	1	(0)
1994–1998	Deportivo Alavés	139	(53)
1998–2001	Espanyol	52	(7)
2001–2003	Elche	64	(12)
2003–2004	Castellón	23	(3)
2004–2005	Badalona	35	(8)
2005–2006	Masnou	37	(13)
2006–2007	CD Blanes	0	(0)
2007	CF Alella	7	(6)
Total		454	(135)

International career
1997	Catalonia	1	(0)
- * Club domestic league appearances and goals

Manuel Serrano Pulido (born 10 September 1972) is a Spanish former professional footballer who played as a forward. He played in La Liga for Espanyol, making a total of 52 top flight appearances, scoring seven goals. He also made over 150 appearances during a four-year spell with Deportivo Alavés.

== Club career ==
Born in El Masnou, Barcelona, Catalonia, Serrano started out playing in the youth teams of local clubs Masnou and Español. He moved into senior football with Segunda División B side L'Hospitalet during the 1990–91 season, making his debut on 7 April 1991 in a home tie against Manacor. He came off the bench in the second half, scoring at the end of the game to round off a 6–1 victory for L'Hospi.

Serrano stayed with L'Hospitalet until 1994, being a key part of the team for the next three seasons. He also had a brief spell on loan at Deportivo Alavés in the latter stages of the 1992–93 season, during which the club were champions in Segunda División B. During this period, he also made a solitary appearance for the Español first team, coming on as a second-half substitute in a Segunda División fixture away at Estadio San Lázaro against Compostela on 7 October 1993, which they lost 3–0.

Serrano joined Alavés permanently ahead of the 1994–95 season, and immediately helped them to another Segunda División B triumph in his first year. On this occasion, the club also won promotion through the play-offs to the second tier. During four seasons at Mendizorrotza, Serrano made a total of 159 appearances in all competitions, scoring 61 goals. He left the club after a very successful 1997–98 season, in which they won promotion to La Liga as Segunda División champions, and also reached the semi-finals of the Copa del Rey before losing 3–1 on aggregate to Mallorca.

Serrano would make his top flight debut the following season, but not for Alavés, as he departed to rejoin boyhood club Espanyol. He was limited to only four appearances in his first year thanks to suffering a serious injury early in the season in a match against Real Betis. Over the next two seasons, he was a consistent member of the team, more often than not coming off the bench in place of regular starting strikers Raúl Tamudo or Miguel Ángel Benítez.

During a home fixture against Mallorca at Estadi Olímpic de Montjuïc on 21 November 1999, having come on at half time in place of Martín Posse, Serrano was punched by Mallorca goalkeeper Germán Burgos. Burgos, who alleged that Serrano had made racist comments during the match, was later banned for 11 matches as a result of this incident. Mallorca went on to win the game 2–1.

On 27 May 2000, Serrano featured in the Copa del Rey final, as Espanyol took on Atlético Madrid at the Mestalla. Serrano came off the bench to replace Tamudo with 20 minutes to play, at which point Espanyol lead 1–0 thanks to an early goal from Tamudo. They added a second six minutes from time through Sergio González, and held on to win 2–1 despite a late goal from Jimmy Floyd Hasselbaink, giving Serrano the only major honour of his career.

This victory qualified Espanyol for the 2000–01 UEFA Cup, and Serrano made his debut in this competition on 14 September 2000, in the first leg of their first round tie against Slovenian side Olimpija Ljubljana at Bežigrad Stadium. Serrano started the match and played the first 73 minutes. Espanyol lost the match 2–1, but went on to win the tie 3–2 on aggregate, and ultimately reached the third round before being eliminated by Porto.

Serrano left Espanyol in 2001, having scored eleven goals in 71 appearances in all competitions across his three seasons with the club. He joined Elche in July, arriving at the same time as fellow striker Meca from Real Madrid. Serrano spent the next two seasons at Estadio Martínez Valero, making a total of 66 appearances and scoring twelve goals.

Serrano went off to spend two seasons in Segunda División B, firstly with Castellón, before joining Badalona in the summer of 2004. He returned to his hometown club Masnou in 2005, and helped them to the Primera Catalana title and promotion to the Tercera División in the 2005–06 season. He finished his career with brief spells at small Catalan clubs CD Blanes and CF Atella.

== International career ==
While Serrano was never called up to the Spain national team, he was capped once by the Catalonia representative side. His sole appearance came in a 1–1 draw with Bulgaria at Espanyol's stadium on 23 December 1997.

== Honours ==
Deportivo Alavés

- Segunda División: 1997–98
- Segunda División B: 1992–93, 1994–95

Espanyol

- Copa del Rey: 1999–2000
- Segunda División: 1993–94
- Supercopa de España: 2000

Masnou

- Primera Catalana runner-up (earning promotion): 2005–06
