= 1997–98 RCD Espanyol season =

RCD Espanyol
1997–98 season
- Head coach: José Antonio Camacho
- Stadium: Estadi Olímpic Lluís Companys
- La Liga: 10th
- Copa del Rey: Second round
- Top goalscorer: League: Juan Esnáider (13); All: Juan Esnáider (13)

The 1997–98 season was the 98th in the history of RCD Espanyol and their fourth consecutive season in the top flight. The club participated in La Liga and the Copa del Rey. The season covered the period from 1 July 1997 to 30 June 1998.

== Pre-season and friendlies ==
Win Draw Loss

26 August 1997 Ciutat de Barcelona Trophy	Espanyol	2–2	Milan	Barcelona
CEST (UTC+2)				Stadium: Estadi Olímpic Lluís Companys; Attendance: 22,000; Referee: Garcia Aranda

== Competitions ==
=== Overall record ===
Competition	First match	Last match	Starting round	Final position	Record							
Competition	First match	Last match	Starting round	Final position	Pld	W	D	L	GF	GA	GD	Win %
La Liga	31 August 1997	15 May 1998	Matchday 1	10th	38	12	17	9	44	31	+13	31.58
Copa del Rey	8 October 1997	29 October 1997	Second round	Second round	2	0	1	1	2	3	−1	0.00
Total					40	12	18	10	46	34	+12	30.00

Source: Competitions

=== La Liga ===
==== League table ====
Pos	Team	Pld	W	D	L	GF	GA	GD	Pts	Qualification or relegation
8	Real Betis	38	17	8	13	49	50	−1	59	Qualification for the UEFA Cup first round
9	Valencia	38	16	7	15	58	52	+6	55	Qualification for the Intertoto Cup third round
10	Espanyol	38	12	17	9	44	31	+13	53	Qualification for the Intertoto Cup second round
11	Valladolid	38	13	11	14	36	47	−11	50	
12	Deportivo La Coruña	38	12	13	13	44	46	−2	49	

Source: LFP
Rules for classification: 1) points; 2) head-to-head points; 3) head-to-head goal difference; 4) head-to-head goals scored; 5) goal difference; 6) number of goals scored.

==== Results by round ====
Round	1	2	3	4	5	6	7	8	9	10	11	12	13	14	15	16	17	18	19	20	21	22	23	24	25	26	27	28	29	30	31	32	33	34	35	36	37	38
Ground	A	H	A	H	A	H	H	A	H	A	H	A	H	A	H	A	H	A	H	H	A	H	A	H	A	A	H	A	H	A	H	A	H	A	H	A	H	A
Result	W	D	D	D	D	W	W	W	W	L	W	D	D	D	W	L	D	L	W	L	L	D	D	L	D	W	D	L	L	D	W	L	W	D	D	D	W	D
Position																																						

Source: La Liga
A = Away; H = Home; W = Win; D = Draw; L = Loss

==== Matches ====
31 August 1997 1	Athletic Bilbao	1–3	Espanyol	Bilbao
CEST (UTC+2)

7 September 1997 2	Espanyol	1–1	Celta Vigo	Barcelona
CEST (UTC+2)				Stadium: Estadi Olímpic Lluís Companys

14 September 1997 3	Oviedo	1–1	Espanyol	Oviedo
CEST (UTC+2)

29 September 1997 4	Espanyol	0–0	Mérida	Barcelona
CEST (UTC+2)				Stadium: Estadi Olímpic Lluís Companys

4 October 1997 5	Zaragoza	1–1	Espanyol	Zaragoza
CEST (UTC+2)

15 October 1997 6	Espanyol	1–0	Compostela	Barcelona
CEST (UTC+2)				Stadium: Estadi Olímpic Lluís Companys

19 October 1997 7	Espanyol	5–0	Real Betis	Barcelona
CEST (UTC+2)				Stadium: Estadi Olímpic Lluís Companys

26 October 1997 8	Atlético Madrid	0–2	Espanyol	Madrid
CEST (UTC+2)

2 November 1997 9	Espanyol	3–0	Salamanca	Barcelona
CET (UTC+1)				Stadium: Estadi Olímpic Lluís Companys

9 November 1997 10	Real Sociedad	2–0	Espanyol	San Sebastián
CET (UTC+1)

12 November 1997 11	Espanyol	3–0	Valencia	Barcelona
CET (UTC+1)				Stadium: Estadi Olímpic Lluís Companys

16 November 1997 12	Deportivo La Coruña	1–1	Espanyol	A Coruña
CET (UTC+1)

24 November 1997 13	Espanyol	1–1	Sporting Gijón	Barcelona
CET (UTC+1)				Stadium: Estadi Olímpic Lluís Companys

30 November 1997 14	Tenerife	0–0	Espanyol	Santa Cruz de Tenerife
CET (UTC+1)

6 December 1997 15	Espanyol	1–0	Mallorca	Barcelona
CET (UTC+1)				Stadium: Estadi Olímpic Lluís Companys

13 December 1997 16	Barcelona	3–1	Espanyol	Barcelona
CET (UTC+1)				Stadium: Camp Nou

17 December 1997 17	Espanyol	0–0	Racing Santander	Barcelona
CET (UTC+1)				Stadium: Estadi Olímpic Lluís Companys

21 December 1997 18	Real Madrid	2–1	Espanyol	Madrid
CET (UTC+1)

4 January 1998 19	Espanyol	2–0	Valladolid	Barcelona
CET (UTC+1)				Stadium: Estadi Olímpic Lluís Companys

11 January 1998 20	Espanyol	0–1	Athletic Bilbao	Barcelona
CET (UTC+1)				Stadium: Estadi Olímpic Lluís Companys

17 January 1998 21	Celta Vigo	1–0	Espanyol	Vigo
CET (UTC+1)

25 January 1998 22	Espanyol	0–0	Oviedo	Barcelona
CET (UTC+1)				Stadium: Estadi Olímpic Lluís Companys

1 February 1998 23	Mérida	1–1	Espanyol	Mérida
CET (UTC+1)

8 February 1998 24	Espanyol	0–1	Zaragoza	Barcelona
CET (UTC+1)				Stadium: Estadi Olímpic Lluís Companys

15 February 1998 25	Compostela	1–1	Espanyol	Santiago de Compostela
CET (UTC+1)

22 February 1998 26	Real Betis	1–3	Espanyol	Seville
CET (UTC+1)

28 February 1998 27	Espanyol	2–2	Atlético Madrid	Barcelona
CEST (UTC+2)				Stadium: Estadi Olímpic Lluís Companys

8 March 1998 28	Salamanca	2–1	Espanyol	Salamanca
CEST (UTC+2)

15 March 1998 29	Espanyol	0–3	Real Sociedad	Barcelona
CEST (UTC+2)				Stadium: Estadi Olímpic Lluís Companys

22 March 1998 30	Valencia	0–0	Espanyol	Valencia
CEST (UTC+2)

29 March 1998 31	Espanyol	2–0	Deportivo La Coruña	Barcelona
CEST (UTC+2)				Stadium: Estadi Olímpic Lluís Companys

5 April 1998 32	Sporting Gijón	1–0	Espanyol	Gijón
CEST (UTC+2)

12 April 1998 33	Espanyol	2–0	Tenerife	Barcelona
CEST (UTC+2)				Stadium: Estadi Olímpic Lluís Companys

19 April 1998 34	Mallorca	2–2	Espanyol	Palma
CEST (UTC+2)

25 April 1998 35	Espanyol	1–1	Barcelona	Barcelona
CEST (UTC+2)				Stadium: Estadi Olímpic Lluís Companys

3 May 1998 36	Racing Santander	1–1	Espanyol	Santander
CEST (UTC+2)

9 May 1998 37	Espanyol	1–0	Real Madrid	Barcelona
CEST (UTC+2)				Stadium: Estadi Olímpic Lluís Companys

15 May 1998 38	Valladolid	0–0	Espanyol	Valladolid
CEST (UTC+2)

=== Copa del Rey ===
==== Second round ====
8 October 1997 First leg	Figueres	1–1	Espanyol	Figueres
CEST (UTC+2)

29 October 1997 Second leg	Espanyol	1–2 (2–3 agg.)	Figueres	Barcelona
CEST (UTC+2)				Stadium: Estadi Olímpic Lluís Companys
