= Aitor Arregi =

Spanish footballer

Personal information
- Full name: Aitor Arregi Arrieta
- Date of birth: 19 May 1990 (age 36)
- Place of birth: Bergara, Spain
- Height: 1.82 m (6 ft 0 in)
- Position: Centre-back

Youth career
- Eibar

Senior career*
Years	Team	Apps	(Gls)
2009–2012	Eibar B	65	(0)
2011–2015	Eibar	47	(1)
2014–2015	→ Cádiz (loan)	16	(0)
2015–2016	La Roda	32	(1)
2016–2017	Leioa	33	(3)
2017–2018	El Ejido	18	(2)
2018	Racing Ferrol	11	(0)
2018–2022	Amorebieta	97	(5)
2022–2023	Logroñés	44	(7)
- * Club domestic league appearances and goals as of 16:49, 28 May 2024 (UTC)

Aitor Arregi Arrieta (born 19 May 1990) is a Spanish footballer who plays as a centre-back.

== Club career ==
Arregi was born in Bergara, Gipuzkoa, Basque Country. He played youth football with local club SD Eibar, making his senior debut in the 2009–10 season with the reserves in the Tercera División.

In September 2011, Arregi was definitely promoted to the first team, signing a new two-year contract. In the 2012–13 campaign, he appeared in 25 matches (including the playoffs) and scored once as they achieved promotion.

Arregi made his Segunda División debut on 31 August 2013, starting in a 1–1 away draw against UD Las Palmas. On 1 August of the following year, after featuring rarely as his side achieved another promotion, he was loaned to Cádiz CF in the third division.

Arregi terminated his contract at the Ipurua Municipal Stadium on 2 July 2015, and subsequently signed for La Roda CF in the third tier. He continued to compete in that league the following years, representing SD Leioa, CD El Ejido, Racing de Ferrol and SD Amorebieta; with the latter, he was a regular starter in their first-ever promotion to division two in 2021.

On 27 January 2022, Arregi severed his ties to Amorebieta, and joined Primera División RFEF's UD Logroñés the following day.
