= Vicente (footballer, born 1975) =

Spanish footballer

Personal information
- Full name: Vicente Fernández Pujante
- Date of birth: 17 September 1975 (age 51)
- Place of birth: Vilanova, Spain
- Height: 1.85 m (6 ft 1 in)
- Position: Midfielder

Youth career
- Español

Senior career*
Years	Team	Apps	(Gls)
1992–1994	Español B		
1993	Español	1	(0)
1994–1998	Lleida	93	(12)
1998–2001	Sporting Gijón	57	(1)
2001–2004	Mallorca	9	(0)
2004–2005	Girona	4	(0)
Total		164	(13)
- * Club domestic league appearances and goals

Vicente Fernández Pujante (born 17 September 1975 in Vilanova i la Geltrú, Barcelona, Catalonia), known simply as Vicente, is a Spanish former professional footballer who played as a midfielder.
