= Miguel Hernández (footballer, born 1970) =

Spanish footballer

Miguel
Personal information
- Full name: Miguel Hernández Sánchez
- Date of birth: 19 February 1970 (age 56)
- Place of birth: Madrid, Spain
- Height: 1.85 m (6 ft 1 in)
- Position: Centre-back

Youth career
- Pegaso

Senior career*
Years	Team	Apps	(Gls)
1988–1990	Pegaso	38	(0)
1990–1994	Rayo Vallecano	119	(2)
1994–1996	Espanyol	2	(0)
1996–1997	Salamanca	6	(0)
1997–1998	Lleida	22	(0)
1998–1999	Terrassa	15	(0)
1999–2000	Móstoles	15	(0)
Total		217	(2)

International career
1991–1992	Spain U23	5	(0)

Managerial career
- 2011: San Fernando Henares
- * Club domestic league appearances and goals

Olympic medal record

Representing Spain

Men's Football
Gold medal – first place	1992 Barcelona	Team competition

Miguel Hernández Sánchez (born 19 February 1970), known simply as Miguel, is a Spanish former professional footballer who played as a central defender.

== Career ==
Born in Madrid, Miguel spent four seasons in La Liga during his 12-year senior career, two years apiece with Rayo Vallecano and RCD Espanyol. He was part of Spain's gold medal-winning squad at the 1992 Summer Olympics in Barcelona.
