= Jaime Molina =

Spanish football manager

Personal information
- Full name: Jaime Ramón Molina Mata
- Date of birth: 15 March 1969 (age 57)
- Place of birth: Estepona, Spain
- Height: 1.86 m (6 ft 1 in)
- Position: Defender

Team information
- Current team: St Joseph's (manager)

Youth career
- Málaga

Senior career*
Years	Team	Apps	(Gls)
1986–1989	Málaga B		
1988–1992	Málaga	107	(1)
1992–1993	Marbella	31	(0)
1993–1994	Mérida	27	(0)
1994–1997	Espanyol	13	(0)
1997–1999	Mérida	86	(4)
1999–2001	Las Palmas	51	(0)
2001–2005	Numancia	104	(3)
Total		419	(8)

Managerial career
- 2006–2007: Mérida
- 2008–2009: Los Barrios
- 2010–2011: Villanovense
- 2011–2012: Málaga B
- 2012–2013: Estepona
- 2013–2014: Marbella
- 2016–2017: Mensajero
- 2017: Gibraltar Phoenix
- 2017–2018: Linares Deportivo
- 2020: SD Ejea
- 2021–2022: St Joseph's
- * Club domestic league appearances and goals

Jaime Ramón Molina Mata (born 15 March 1969) is a Spanish retired footballer who played as a defender, and is a manager, currently in charge of St Joseph's.

He amassed Segunda División totals of 296 games and five goals over the course of 11 seasons, representing mainly Málaga, Mérida and Numancia (three years apiece). He added 123 matches and three goals in La Liga, where he also appeared for the first and third clubs.

Molina became a manager in 2006, working always in the lower leagues.

== Playing career ==
Born in Estepona, Málaga, Andalusia, Molina graduated from CD Málaga's youth setup. He made his senior debut with the reserves in 1986, aged only 17.

On 10 January 1988, Molina appeared in his first game as a professional, starting in a 3–1 home win against Deportivo de La Coruña. He finished the season with six appearances, as his team was promoted to La Liga.

Molina was promoted to the main squad in 1989, and made his debut in the Spanish top level on 2 October 1988 by starting in a 1–1 draw at Sevilla FC. He featured regularly during the following campaigns, leaving the club in 1992 after it folded.

Molina subsequently alternated between the first and second divisions, representing CA Marbella, CP Mérida (two stints), RCD Espanyol, UD Las Palmas and CD Numancia. He retired with the latter side at the end of 2004–05 at the age of 36, having appeared in 22 matches and scored once in a relegation-ending season.

== Coaching career ==
Molina started his managerial career shortly after retiring, taking charge of Mérida UD. He left in 2007, and was appointed at UD Los Barrios in the summer of 2008.

On 5 July 2011, after a stint at CF Villanovense, Molina was named Atlético Malagueño coach. In July of the following year he moved to Unión Estepona CF, and signed as head coach of Marbella FC on 3 May 2013.
