= Manel (footballer, born 1973) =

Spanish footballer

Personal information
- Full name: Manel Martínez Fernández
- Date of birth: 3 November 1973 (age 53)
- Place of birth: Ripollet, Spain
- Height: 1.90 m (6 ft 3 in)
- Position: Centre-forward

Youth career
- Sabadell

Senior career*
Years	Team	Apps	(Gls)
1992–1995	Sabadell	35	(15)
1995–1999	Logroñés	164	(77)
2000–2003	Espanyol	20	(3)
2001	→ Sporting Gijón (loan)	19	(11)
2002–2003	→ Sporting Gijón (loan)	33	(3)
2004	Derby County	15	(3)
2004–2006	Badalona	34	(6)
2006–2007	Sabadell	14	(3)
2007–2008	Ibiza-Eivissa	18	(3)
2008	Lorca Deportiva	15	(5)
Total		353	(126)
- * Club domestic league appearances and goals

Manel Martínez Fernández (born 3 November 1973), known simply as Manel, is a Spanish former professional footballer who played as a centre-forward.

During his extensive career, he was mainly associated to Logroñés.

== Club career ==
Born in Ripollet, Barcelona, Catalonia, Manel started his career with local CE Sabadell FC, signing for CD Logroñés in 1995 and scoring 27 Segunda División goals in his first year, with La Liga promotion. In the following season, the Riojan side were relegated again but he proceeded to add a further 44 goals over the next three second-tier campaigns, being one of the club's all-time best.

Manel then moved between RCD Espanyol (appearing rarely) and Sporting de Gijón in the following seasons. He also had a brief spell abroad with Derby County, scoring three times in 16 competitive games including twice in a 5–1 home rout of Preston North End in the Football League Championship.

Returning home in May 2004, Manel successively represented CF Badalona, Sabadell, UD Ibiza-Eivissa and Lorca Deportiva CF. After retiring in 2009, having totalled 239 matches in the two top divisions of Spanish football with 96 goals, he joined UE Sant Andreu – also in his native region – as a youth coach.
