= Francisco López (footballer, born 1962) =

Spanish footballer and manager

Francisco
Personal information
- Full name: Francisco Javier López Alfaro
- Date of birth: 1 November 1962 (age 63)
- Place of birth: Osuna, Spain
- Height: 1.82 m (6 ft 0 in)
- Position: Midfielder

Youth career
- Sevilla

Senior career*
Years	Team	Apps	(Gls)
1980–1981	Sevilla B		
1981–1990	Sevilla	258	(20)
1990–1997	Espanyol	207	(27)
Total		465	(47)

International career
1981	Spain U18	2	(0)
1981	Spain U19	4	(0)
1981	Spain U20	3	(1)
1983–1984	Spain U21	9	(1)
1983	Spain amateur	2	(0)
1982–1986	Spain	20	(1)

Managerial career
- 1998–2000: Espanyol (youth)
- 2000–2001: Coria
- 2001–2002: Jaén
- 2002–2003: Extremadura
- 2003–2004: Figueres
- 2004–2005: Numancia
- 2006–2008: Badalona
- 2008: Eivissa-Ibiza
- 2009: Atlético Baleares
- 2010: Sevilla C
Medal record
Representing Spain
UEFA European Championship
Runner-up	1984 France
- * Club domestic league appearances and goals

Francisco Javier López Alfaro (born 1 November 1962), known simply as Francisco as a player, is a Spanish former professional football central midfielder and manager.

== Club career ==
Francisco was born in Osuna, Province of Seville, Andalusia. During his career he represented Sevilla FC, his hometown club, and RCD Espanyol, appearing in 436 La Liga matches. He finished his first season in the competition with 20 games – all starts – and one goal, helping the former to finish seventh.

In the 1992–93 campaign, Francisco experienced top-flight relegation with the Catalans, but achieved promotion the following year always as an important player. He retired at the end of 1996–97, aged 34.

López began working as a manager with Espanyol's youth sides, then proceeded to coach Coria CF, Real Jaén, CF Extremadura, UE Figueres and top-tier CD Numancia. He was dismissed after ten rounds in the 2004–05 season, as the latter were eventually relegated. In July 2006, he joined Segunda División B team CF Badalona.

Midway through the 2008–09 campaign, López was sacked as manager of CD Atlético Baleares, also in division three. Subsequently, he was appointed at Sevilla FC C in the Tercera División.

== International career ==
Francisco earned 20 caps and scored one goal for Spain, and was selected for both the UEFA Euro 1984 and the 1986 FIFA World Cup tournaments. His debut came on 27 October 1982, in a 1–0 win over Iceland in the Euro 1984 qualifiers.

At the 1984 European Championships, Francisco made two appearances for the runners-up. One was them was in the 2–0 final loss against the hosts France, due to injury or suspension to three habitual starters.

== Career statistics ==
#	Date	Venue	Opponent	Score	Result	Competition
1.	24 September 1986	El Molinón, Gijón, Spain	Greece	2–0	3–1	Friendly

== Honours ==
=== Player ===
Espanyol

- Segunda División: 1993–94

Spain

- UEFA European Championship runner-up: 1984

Spain Under-21

- UEFA Under-21 European Championship runner-up: 1984

== See also ==
- List of La Liga players (400+ appearances)
