= Víctor Torres Mestre =

Spanish footballer & manager (born 1970)

Personal information
- Full name: Víctor Manuel Torres Mestre
- Date of birth: 31 December 1970 (age 55)
- Place of birth: Madrid, Spain
- Height: 1.78 m (5 ft 10 in)
- Position: Left back

Youth career
- 1977–1989: Real Madrid

Senior career*
Years	Team	Apps	(Gls)
1989–1992	Real Madrid B	47	(0)
1990–1991	Real Madrid	2	(0)
1993	Logroñés	1	(0)
1993–1998	Espanyol	178	(1)
1998–1999	Bordeaux	24	(0)
1999–2000	Alavés	33	(0)
2000–2001	Betis	13	(0)
2001	Varzim	3	(0)
2004–2005	Sporting Mahonés	15	(0)
2005–2006	Premià	21	(0)
Total		337	(1)

International career
1985–1987	Spain U16	8	(0)

Managerial career
- 2010–2011: Real Madrid (youth)
- 2011: Badajoz
- * Club domestic league appearances and goals

Víctor Manuel Torres Mestre (born 31 December 1970) is a Spanish retired footballer who played as a left back.

== Playing career ==
Torres Mestre was born in Madrid. After unsuccessfully graduating through Real Madrid's youth ranks, only appearing in two La Liga matches in three and a half years and mainly playing with the B-squad, he was released in January 1993, only to find opportunities also scarce at fellow league club Logroñés.

In the summer of 1993, Torres Mestre signed with Espanyol, being an instant first-choice as the Catalan team won the Segunda División title and finished sixth in the following season, narrowly missing out on qualification for the UEFA Cup. He remained a starter until 1998, when he left for Bordeaux.

After one season in France, in which he was the most utilized player in his position as Bordeaux won the Division 1 championship, Torres Mestre returned to Spain, playing with Alavés and Betis, the latter in the second tier. He retired in 2006, after spells with Varzim in Portugal and with amateur sides Sporting Mahonés and Premià.

== Coaching career ==
Torres Mestre started coaching in 2010, taking charge of Real Madrid youth sides. He started the 2011–12 campaign at the helm of Badajoz in Segunda División B, leaving his post after only 18 rounds claiming unpaid wages.

== Honours ==
Español

- Segunda División: 1993–94

Bordeaux

- Division 1: 1998–99
