= Pacheta =

Spanish football manager (born 1968)

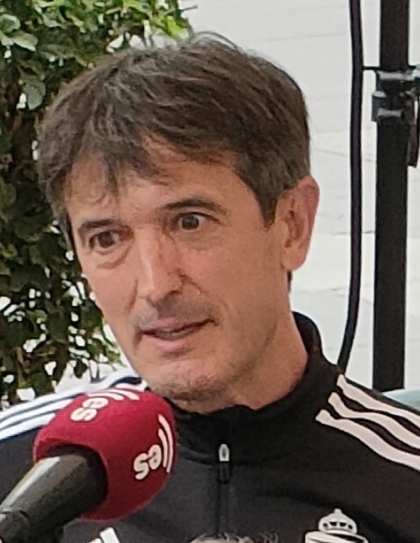
- Pacheta in 2022

Personal information
- Full name: José Rojo Martín
- Date of birth: 23 March 1968 (age 58)
- Place of birth: Salas de los Infantes, Spain
- Height: 1.84 m (6 ft 0 in)
- Position: Midfielder

Team information
- Current team: Granada (manager)

Youth career
- Racing Lermeño

Senior career*
Years	Team	Apps	(Gls)
1987–1989	Racing Lermeño		
1989–1990	Numancia	15	(1)
1990–1991	Burgalés		
1991–1993	Marbella	67	(9)
1993–1994	Mérida	24	(5)
1994–1999	Espanyol	118	(5)
1999–2004	Numancia	121	(18)
Total		345	(38)

Managerial career
- 2009: Numancia
- 2011–2012: Oviedo
- 2012–2013: Cartagena
- 2013–2014: Korona Kielce
- 2014–2015: Hércules
- 2016–2017: Ratchaburi
- 2018–2020: Elche
- 2021: Huesca
- 2021–2023: Valladolid
- 2023: Villarreal
- 2025–: Granada
- * Club domestic league appearances and goals

José Rojo Martín (born 23 March 1968), known as Pacheta, is a Spanish former professional footballer who played as a midfielder, currently manager of Segunda División club Granada.

He amassed La Liga totals of 183 matches and 15 goals over seven seasons, representing in the competition Espanyol and Numancia. He added 112 games and 17 goals in the Segunda División.

In 2009, Pacheta became a manager, leading Numancia, Huesca, Valladolid and Villarreal in the top flight while also having brief spells in Poland and Thailand.

== Playing career ==
Born in Salas de los Infantes, Province of Burgos, Castile and León, Pacheta inherited his nickname as a family tradition of unknown origin. He made his debut as a senior with local Racing Lermeño in 1987 while also working as a carpenter. Two years later, he moved to Numancia of Segunda División B.

After failing to appear in La Liga with Real Burgos during the 1990–91 season (he only appeared for the farm team Atlético Burgalés in the Tercera División), Pacheta signed for third-tier side Marbella, being promoted in his debut campaign. On 6 September 1992, he played his first match as a professional, starting in a 1–1 Segunda División home draw against Castellón.

In June 1994, following a short spell at Mérida, Pacheta joined top-division Espanyol. His maiden appearance in the competition took place on 17 September, when he came on as a second-half substitute in the 0–0 home draw with Barcelona. He scored his first goal on 16 April of the following year, in a 3–1 victory over Athletic Bilbao also at the Sarrià Stadium.

Pacheta signed with Numancia of the same league in summer 1999, after 134 competitive appearances for the Catalans. He retired in 2004 at the age of 36, joining the former club's staff shortly after.

== Coaching career ==
In June 2007, Pacheta was appointed Numancia's director of football, switching to manager on 17 February 2009 as a replacement for the fired Sergije Krešić. He remained in charge for 15 matches, as the Soria team were eventually relegated from the top flight.

On 15 February 2011, Pacheta signed for Real Oviedo in division three, leading the club to eighth place and renewing his contract for a further year in May. He resigned on 24 May 2012, and joined Cartagena on 10 December.

Pacheta was relieved of his duties on 20 May 2013, despite earning runner-up honours in the league with the Murcians, albeit without promotion to the second tier. He moved abroad in August, being appointed at Ekstraklasa side Korona Kielce.

Pacheta left the Polish team in June 2014, and signed with Hércules shortly after. On 25 January of the following year, he was sacked after only managing to win three out of twelve home games.

On 27 February 2018, after an experience in Thailand with Ratchaburi, Pacheta replaced the dismissed Josico at the helm of Elche. On 22 May 2019, after achieving promotion to the second division the previous campaign, he renewed his contract for a further season.

Just two days after promoting to the top tier in the play-offs, Pacheta left the Estadio Martínez Valero on 25 August 2020. The following 12 January, he took over for Míchel at Huesca in the same league. After not being able to avoid relegation, he resigned.

On 16 June 2021, Pacheta was appointed manager of Real Valladolid, also relegated to the second division. He managed another promotion in his first year, as runners-up, but was dismissed on 3 April 2023 due to poor results, the last being a 6–0 away loss to Real Madrid which left his team one point above the relegation zone.

Pacheta became the new coach of Villarreal on 9 September 2023, taking over from Quique Setién. Two months later, after five wins, three draws and four defeats in 12 matches in all competitions, and with the club sitting 13th in the league, just five points away from the relegation zone, he was sacked.

On 14 May 2025, Pacheta was appointed at Granada on a contract with until 2026. He replaced Fran Escribá for the final three fixtures of the regular season, with the goal of reaching the top-flight promotion playoffs by finishing in the top six, eventually falling short by four points.

== Managerial statistics ==
As of match played 21 November 2026

Managerial record by team and tenure
Team	Nat	From	To	Record								Ref
Team	Nat	From	To	G	W	D	L	GF	GA	GD	Win %	Ref
Numancia	(Spain)	17 February 2009	2 June 2009	15	4	3	8	12	23	−11	26.67	
Oviedo	(Spain)	15 February 2011	24 May 2012	55	29	9	17	77	56	+21	52.73	
Cartagena	(Spain)	10 December 2012	20 May 2013	26	12	10	4	39	21	+18	46.15	
Korona Kielce	(Poland)	13 August 2013	10 June 2014	34	10	13	11	45	54	−9	29.41	
Hércules	(Spain)	11 June 2014	25 January 2015	23	9	9	5	25	16	+9	39.13	
Ratchaburi	(Thailand)	11 January 2016	30 November 2017	75	37	15	23	127	90	+37	49.33	
Elche	(Spain)	27 February 2018	25 August 2020	110	43	39	28	138	117	+21	39.09	
Huesca	(Spain)	12 January 2021	25 May 2021	20	6	4	10	20	25	−5	30.00	
Valladolid	(Spain)	16 June 2021	3 April 2023	75	36	13	26	102	93	+9	48.00	
Villarreal	(Spain)	9 September 2023	10 November 2023	12	5	3	4	19	15	+4	41.67	
Granada	(Spain)	14 May 2025	present	65	27	15	23	94	83	+11	41.54	
Total				510	218	133	159	698	593	+105	42.75	—
