= César Santis =

Chilean footballer (born 1979)

Personal information
- Full name: César Elías Santis Santander
- Date of birth: 5 February 1979 (age 47)
- Place of birth: Santiago, Chile
- Height: 1.80 m (5 ft 11 in)
- Position: Left-back

Senior career*
Years	Team	Apps	(Gls)
1996–1998	Unión Española	59	(1)
1998–2002	Espanyol	3	(0)
2001–2002	→ Real Murcia (loan)	3	(0)
2002–2003	Unión Española	19	(0)
2004–2005	Everton	28	(0)
2006	Deportes Antofagasta	8	(1)
2006–2008	Audax Italiano	54	(0)
Total		174	(2)

International career
1999	Chile	1	(0)
- * Club domestic league appearances and goals

César Elías Santis Santander (born 5 February 1979) is a Chilean former professional footballer who played as a left-back.

== Career ==
Santis played for Unión Española (1996–98, 2002–03), Espanyol (1998–2000), Real Murcia (2001–02), Everton de Viña del Mar (2004–05), Deportes Antofagasta (2006) and Audax Italiano (2006–09).

In March 2007 he played in a Copa Libertadores match for Audax, against Necaxa.

Santis made an appearance for the Chile national team in a friendly match versus Bolivia on 28 April 1999.

== Honours ==
Espanyol

- Copa del Rey: 1999-00
