= Iván Díaz (footballer, born 1978) =

Spanish footballer

Personal information
- Full name: Iván Díaz Ruiz
- Date of birth: 10 July 1978 (age 48)
- Place of birth: Sabadell, Spain
- Height: 1.73 m (5 ft 8 in)
- Position: Midfielder

Youth career
- Comerç Creu
- 1993–1995: Sabadell
- 1995–1997: Barcelona

Senior career*
| Years | Team | Apps | (Gls) |
| 1995 | Sabadell | 1 | (0) |
| 1997–1998 | Sabadell | 34 | (3) |
| 1998–2001 | Espanyol B | 69 | (5) |
| 1999–2002 | Espanyol | 24 | (0) |
| 2002–2003 | → Albacete (loan) | 25 | (1) |
| 2003–2005 | Albacete | 23 | (0) |
| 2005–2006 | Sabadell | 31 | (4) |
| 2006–2007 | Figueres | 31 | (3) |
| 2007–2008 | Logroñés | 17 | (1) |
| 2008 | Atlético Ciudad | 13 | (1) |
| 2008–2009 | Espanyol B | 28 | (5) |
| 2009–2010 | Terrassa | 19 | (2) |
| 2010 | Sangonera | 18 | (2) |
| 2010 | Leganés | 7 | (0) |
| 2010 | Premià | 4 | (0) |
| 2011 | Halmstad | 6 | (0) |
| 2011–2012 | Leganés | 14 | (0) |
| 2012 | Auckland City | 3 | (0) |
| 2012 | Santboià | 12 | (4) |
| 2012–2013 | Palamós | 27 | (5) |
| 2013–2016 | Alcanar | 75 | (11) |
| 2016 | Ripoll | 12 | (2) |
| 2017–2018 | Sabadellenca | | |
| Total | | 493 | (49) |
- * Club domestic league appearances and goals

Iván Díaz Ruiz (born 10 July 1978) is a Spanish former professional footballer who played as a midfielder.

== Club career ==
Born in Sabadell, Barcelona, Catalonia, Díaz was a FC Barcelona youth graduate. He made his senior debut with CE Sabadell FC on 21 May 1995, coming on as a substitute in a 2–0 Segunda División B away loss against Benidorm CF at the age of 16 years and 10 months.

Bought by RCD Espanyol in 1998 for 15 million pesetas, Díaz was initially assigned to the reserves also in the third tier. Promoted to the main squad the following year, he made his professional debut on 17 July 1999 when he started the 0–2 home defeat to Montpellier HSC in that year's UEFA Intertoto Cup.

Díaz made his La Liga debut on 22 April 2000, in a 1–0 loss at Real Valladolid. In the summer of 2002 he moved to Albacete Balompié of Segunda División (initially on loan, later permanently), achieving promotion at the first attempt; he scored his first professional goal in the meantime, the winner in a 2–1 home win over UD Las Palmas.

Díaz left Alba in 2005 after suffering relegation, and subsequently resumed his career in the lower leagues, representing Sabadell, UE Figueres, UD Logroñés, CF Atlético Ciudad, Espanyol B, Terrassa FC, Sangonera Atlético CF, CD Leganés (two stints), CE Premià, FC Santboià, Palamós CF, CD Alcanar and Ripoll CF. He also had international stints at Halmstads BK and Auckland City FC.
