= Raúl Arribas =

Spanish footballer

Personal information
- Full name: Raúl Arribas Torre
- Date of birth: 23 June 1969 (age 57)
- Place of birth: Barcelona, Spain
- Height: 1.84 m (6 ft 0 in)
- Position: Goalkeeper

Youth career
- –1988: Español

Senior career*
Years	Team	Apps	(Gls)
1988–1998	Español	11	(0)
1988–1990	→ L'Hospitalet (loan)	68	(0)
1991–1993	→ Palamós (loan)	38	(0)
1998–2005	Leganés	219	(0)
2005–2009	Alcorcón	125	(0)
Total		462	(135)
- * Club domestic league appearances and goals

Raúl Arribas Torre (born 23 June 1969), sometimes known simply as Raúl, is a Spanish former professional footballer who played as a goalkeeper. He played in La Liga for Espanyol, making a total of eleven top flight appearances. He also had long spells in the lower divisions with Leganés and Alcorcón, achieving over 100 appearances for each club.

== Club career ==
Born in Barcelona, Catalonia, Raúl started out playing in the youth teams of local club Español. He was loaned to Segunda División B side L'Hospitalet in 1988, and made 71 appearances for the club before returning to his parent club in 1990. He again went on loan in 1991, this time to Palamós in the Segunda División, where he spent two seasons. From the 1993–94 season, he was part of the Español first team, but made no appearances in his first season as the club earned promotion as Segunda División champions.

Raúl stayed with Espanyol until 1998, but made just 36 appearances in all competitions across five seasons, including eleven in La Liga. He moved back to the second tier with Leganés in 1998, and was the club's first choice goalkeeper for seven seasons, playing a total of 221 matches. Leganés were relegated at the end of the 2003–04 season, and Raúl stayed for one more year before joining fellow third-tier side Alcorcón in 2005.

Raúl played for the next four years with Alcorcón, including representing the club in the 2009 Segunda División B play-offs at the age of 40. They made it the final round before losing to Real Unión, which would be Raúl's final match as a professional.

== Retirement ==
Since his retirement, Raúl runs a dental clinic called Dental Domenech in Leganés with his wife.

== Honours ==
Palamós

- Copa Generalitat: 1991–92

Espanyol

- Segunda División: 1993–94
