= Paco Flores =

Spanish football player and manager (born 1952)

Personal information
- Full name: Francisco Flores Lajusticia
- Date of birth: 26 November 1952 (age 73)
- Place of birth: Barcelona, Spain
- Height: 1.77 m (5 ft 10 in)
- Position: Forward

Youth career
- Español

Senior career*
Years	Team	Apps	(Gls)
1971–1972	Español B		
1972–1976	Español	0	(0)
1972–1973	→ Sabadell (loan)	14	(2)
1973–1974	→ Calella (loan)		
1974–1975	→ San Andrés (loan)	14	(0)
1975–1976	→ Girona (loan)		
1976–1977	Jaén	36	(18)
1977–1980	Español	65	(13)
1980–1981	Jaén	20	(11)
1981–1982	Linares	5	(1)
1982–1984	Santboià		
Total		154	(45)

Managerial career
- 1984–1985: Español C (youth)
- 1985–1987: Español B (youth)
- 1987–1991: Español (youth)
- 1991–1994: Cristinenc
- 1994–1997: Espanyol B
- 1997: Espanyol
- 1997–1998: Espanyol (assistant)
- 1998: Espanyol
- 1999–2000: Espanyol B
- 2000–2002: Espanyol
- 2002–2004: Zaragoza
- 2005–2006: Almería
- 2006–2007: Gimnàstic
- * Club domestic league appearances and goals

Francisco "Paco" Flores Lajusticia (born 26 November 1952) is a Spanish former professional football forward and coach.

His career was closely associated with Espanyol, as both a player and manager.

== Playing career ==
Born in Barcelona, Catalonia, Flores was brought up at hometown's RCD Español, being loaned several times during his contract, exclusively in his native region. Subsequently, after having been re-signed from Real Jaén, he spent three La Liga seasons with his main club, scoring eight goals in 33 matches in his first to help the Pericos to the 14th position, just one point above the relegation zone. He made his debut in the competition on 3 September 1977 at the age of 25, in a 3–1 away loss to Sevilla FC. On 20 November, he netted a late equaliser for the hosts in a 1–1 derby draw against FC Barcelona.

In January 1981, following another stint with Jaén, Flores signed for Linares CF in the Segunda División, but suffered a car accident which nearly cost him the loss of one eye shortly after, leaving the club at the end of his second season. Before retiring, he played a couple of years with amateurs FC Santboià.

== Coaching career ==
Flores took up coaching in 1984, spending one full decade with Español's youth teams (Espanyol from 1995 onwards). He progressed to the B team in 1994, helping them to promote to Segunda División B in his first season.

Flores was appointed first-team manager with 14 games to go in the 1996–97 campaign, replacing the fired Vicente Miera and leading Espanyol to 12th position. He then returned to the reserves for two further seasons.

Flores again came to the rescue of the main squad midway through 1999–2000, occupying the position of dismissed Miguel Ángel Brindisi. He managed to lead the team out of relegation (14th place), adding the club's third Copa del Rey – against Atlético Madrid – the first in 60 years, and remained at the helm for a further two full years.

In 2002–03, Flores accepted a new challenge with Real Zaragoza, helping the Aragonese to return to the top flight after one year and being replaced by Víctor Muñoz after the 20th round of the following season, which also ended with Spanish Cup win. After 11 second-tier games with UD Almería in the 2004–05 campaign, he was in charge of the Andalusians for the full 2005–06, leading them to the sixth position.

Flores returned to the top flight in 2006–07, replacing Luis César Sampedro at Gimnàstic de Tarragona in late November 2006, following a 3–2 home loss against RCD Mallorca. Even though he improved on his predecessor's numbers, it was not good enough to avoid relegation.

== Honours ==
Espanyol

- Copa del Rey: 1999–2000
