= Jordi Lardín =

Spanish footballer

Personal information
- Full name: Jordi Lardín Cruz
- Date of birth: 4 June 1973 (age 53)
- Place of birth: Manresa, Spain
- Height: 1.75 m (5 ft 9 in)
- Position: Winger

Youth career
- Manresa
- 1991–1992: Espanyol

Senior career*
Years	Team	Apps	(Gls)
1990–1991	Manresa		
1992–1997	Espanyol	163	(47)
1992	→ Hospitalet (loan)	2	(1)
1997–2002	Atlético Madrid	69	(6)
2001	→ Espanyol (loan)	8	(0)
2001–2002	→ Xerez (loan)	17	(0)
2004–2005	Leganés	28	(0)
2005–2007	Esparreguera		
Total		287	(54)

International career
1994–1996	Spain U21	15	(1)
1996	Spain U23	4	(0)
1997–1998	Spain	3	(0)
Medal record
Men's football
Representing Spain
UEFA European Under-21 Championship
Runner-up	1996 Spain
- * Club domestic league appearances and goals

Jordi Lardín Cruz (born 4 June 1973) is a Spanish former professional footballer who played mostly as a winger.

Over the course of eight seasons, he amassed La Liga totals of 200 games and 44 goals with Espanyol and Atlético Madrid.

Lardín earned three caps for Spain in the late 1990s.

== Club career ==
Born in Manresa, Province of Barcelona, Catalonia, Lardín was a skilled and pacy attacking player with scoring ability. He started playing football with local CE Manresa, making his professional debut with RCD Espanyol also in his native region in 1992–93; the team would be relegated from La Liga, and he went on to become an essential squad member in the following years.

Lardín scored 29 goals in 76 league games from 1994 to 1996, as the Pericos reached the UEFA Cup in one season and narrowly missed on qualification in another under the guidance of José Antonio Camacho. In the latter campaign, he found the net in both matches against Real Madrid for 3–1 and 2–1 wins; additionally, he helped his side to dispose of that opposition in the Copa del Rey with four goals in the 5–3 aggregate victory.

For 1997–98, Lardín signed with Atlético Madrid for 1.500 million pesetas, but would only appear significantly that season. A serious car accident in October 1997 would not prevent his Spanish national team debut one month later, in a 1–1 friendly against Romania in Palma de Mallorca.

After unassuming loan stints with his former club Espanyol and Xerez CD in the Segunda División, Lardín retired from football at age 29 claiming to be "fed up" with the sport. He made a tentative comeback two years later, with modest CD Leganés.

On 28 November 2016, Lardín left his post as Espanyol's youth football coordinator and was appointed its director of football.

== International career ==
Lardín was part of the Spain squad at the 1996 Summer Olympics, playing all the matches as the national side reached the quarter-finals in Atlanta.

== Honours ==
Espanyol

- Segunda División: 1993–94

Spain U21

- UEFA European Under-21 Championship runner-up: 1996
