= Mauricio Pochettino =

Argentine football manager (born 1972)

- Pochettino in 2026

Personal information
- Full name: Mauricio Roberto Pochettino Trossero
- Date of birth: 2 March 1972 (age 54)
- Place of birth: Murphy, Santa Fe, Argentina
- Height: 1.82 m (6 ft 0 in)
- Position: Centre-back

Team information
- Current team: Manchester United (head coach)

Youth career
- CR Unión y Cultura
- 1986–1989: Newell's Old Boys

Senior career*
Years	Team	Apps	(Gls)
1989–1994	Newell's Old Boys	153	(8)
1994–2001	Espanyol	216	(11)
2001–2003	Paris Saint-Germain	70	(4)
2003–2004	Bordeaux	11	(1)
2004	→ Espanyol (loan)	21	(1)
2004–2006	Espanyol	38	(1)
Total		509	(26)

International career
1991	Argentina U20	3	(0)
1992	Argentina U23	4	(0)
1999–2002	Argentina	20	(2)

Managerial career
- 2009–2012: Espanyol
- 2013–2014: Southampton
- 2014–2019: Tottenham Hotspur
- 2021–2022: Paris Saint-Germain
- 2023–2024: Chelsea
- 2024–2026: United States
- 2026–: Manchester United
Medal record
Men's football
Representing United States (Head coach)
CONCACAF Gold Cup
Runner-up	2025 United
- * Club domestic league appearances and goals

Mauricio Roberto Pochettino Trossero (Italian: [poketˈtiːno trosˈseːro]; born 2 March 1972) is an Argentine professional football manager and former footballer who is currently the head coach of Premier League club Manchester United.

Pochettino played as a centre-back and began his career in 1989 with Primera División club Newell's Old Boys, winning a league title and finishing as runner-up in the 1992 Copa Libertadores. In 1994, he transferred to newly promoted La Liga club Espanyol, helping establish their top-flight status and winning the 2000 Copa del Rey, their first trophy in 60 years. In 2001, he joined Ligue 1 club Paris Saint-Germain, and then had a stint with Bordeaux before returning to Espanyol in 2004, winning another Copa del Rey in 2006. Pochettino was capped 20 times for the Argentina national team and played at the 1999 Copa América and 2002 FIFA World Cup.

After retiring as a player, Pochettino began his managerial career at Espanyol in 2009. In 2013, he was appointed at Premier League club Southampton, leading them to an eighth-place finish that season – equalling their highest ever Premier League finish. He joined Tottenham Hotspur in 2014 and served as their third longest manager in club history, and finished as Premier League runners-up in the 2016–17 season, as well as leading the club to their first ever Champions League final in 2019. He was widely credited for developing young Tottenham stars Dele Alli, Son Heung-min, and Harry Kane. In 2021, Pochettino joined Paris Saint-Germain, where he won the Ligue 1 title and Coupe de France. He took over as Chelsea head coach for the 2023–24 season, he left the club after mutually agreeing to part ways with the club after one season.

In 2024, he was appointed as head coach of the United States national team. At the 2026 FIFA World Cup, he broke the nation's all-time managerial records of the most wins (3) and most goals scored (11) at a World Cup. His contract was subsequently extended through 2030. In November 2026, he was appointed as head coach of Manchester United, after the club activated his buyout clause.

== Early life ==
Pochettino was born in Murphy, Santa Fe, Argentina, to Amalia and Héctor Pochettino, a farm labourer. His family is of Italian descent from Piedmont. Between the ages of eight and ten, he played both football and volleyball, and also learned judo. He supported Racing Club de Avellaneda as a child. The first football matches he watched on television were in the 1978 FIFA World Cup which he watched with his father Héctor. He started playing as a centre-back at an early age for Unión y Cultura, a position he preferred, but he also played as a striker and midfielder. When he was 13, he trained two days a week with Rosario Central in Rosario, Santa Fe, a 160-mile bus ride away from Murphy. He played for Murphy in the first division of the regional Venadense league together with his older brother, Javier. He studied agriculture at a school 20 miles from home.

== Club career ==
=== Newell's Old Boys ===
When he was 13, Pochettino was scouted by Jorge Griffa, director of football at Newell's Old Boys, and his future manager Marcelo Bielsa, then the reserve team coach at Newell's. Although he was happy at Rosario Central who were interested in signing him, he was persuaded to try out for their rivals Newell's Old Boys in Rosario, Santa Fe. He was quickly placed in a team attending a tournament in Mar del Plata in January 1987, and helped the team win 3–2 in the final against Club Olimpia of Paraguay, after which he signed for Newell's. He was offered a professional contract at 16, and made his first appearance in the Primera División in the 1988–89 season when he was 17.

At Newell's, he played in an intense, fast-paced, high press style of play under Bielsa, who was first-team coach from 1990 to 1992. Bielsa's coaching methods and philosophy would have a significant impact on the young player.

During his five-year stint at the club, Pochettino won the 1990–91 national championship as well as the 1992 Clausura. The side also reached the final of the Copa Libertadores helped by Pochettino who netted a crucial goal away to Colombian champions América de Cali in the second match leg of their semi-final, but they were beaten 3–2 in the final in a penalty shoot-out by São Paulo after both teams drew 1–1 on aggregate over the course of two legs. He played with Diego Maradona for a time, sharing a room before games.

=== Espanyol ===
In 1994, Pochettino had the option of joining a number of clubs including Boca Juniors, but chose the Catalan club Espanyol even though it was the least financially attractive offer as he was interested in moving to the city of Barcelona. Aged 22, Pochettino moved to Espanyol for the 1994–95 season, as part of the new intake of players upon their return to La Liga. There, he soon established himself as an automatic first-team starter, and developed a reputation as a tough, uncompromising centre-back. Due to his style of play, Pochettino was nicknamed "the Sheriff", but it was also a reference to his paternal grandfather, who once served as the sheriff of Murphy, Santa Fe. In February 1997, in the local derby against their rival Barcelona at the soon-to-be-demolished home ground Sarrià Stadium, Pochettino man-marked Ronaldo out the game, and helped the team win 2–0. It was their first win against Barcelona in ten years.

He stayed six-and-a-half years at the club. Although he had the opportunity to move on a number of occasions, he chose to stay. In 1998, he stayed so as to reconnect with his former coach Bielsa, and he also rejected an offer from Valencia in the 1999–2000 season out of loyalty to the club. In that season, he helped Espanyol beat Atlético Madrid in the 2000 final of the Copa del Rey, winning their first major trophy in 60 years.

In the 1999–2000 season, he signed a pre-agreement to stay at the club for six more years, contingent on funding. However, the club could not finance the deal, and informed Pochettino that he should accept an offer from Paris Saint-Germain.

=== Paris Saint-Germain ===
In late January 2001, Pochettino signed for Paris Saint-Germain for an undisclosed fee. A regular starter during his stay, he made his official league debut on 3 February 2001 for manager Luis Fernández away to Nantes, which PSG lost 1–0. Three days later, Pochettino netted his first goal in a 1–3 home defeat at the Parc des Princes against Guingamp. His contributions helped Paris Saint-Germain win the 2001 edition of the UEFA Intertoto Cup later in the 2001–02 season following a 1–1 draw with Brescia, which meant the Parisian side won on away goals, as well as reaching the final of the Coupe de France the next season, where PSG lost 1–2 to Auxerre.

=== Bordeaux ===
In July 2003, Pochettino moved to fellow Ligue 1 outfit Bordeaux for the 2003–04 campaign. His first game came on 2 August 2003 against Monaco in a 2–0 defeat. Pochettino's first goal was on 23 August, thus helping Bordeaux overcome Auxerre with a 2–0 home victory.

=== Return to Espanyol ===
During the 2004 summer transfer window, he returned to Espanyol however, initially on loan, before he later made the transfer permanent. The return occurred midway through his first year, and Pochettino continued to play for two-and-a-half more seasons at the club. In the 2005–06 Copa del Rey, he was an unused substitute at the final, where Espanyol beat Zaragoza 4–1.

Following the win, Ernesto Valverde took over as manager in the summer of 2006, but he did not want Pochettino in the squad for the coming season. Pochettino announced his retirement as a player at the age of 34. He studied for a master's degree in sports management at a business school, before training to be a coach in Madrid a year later.

== International career ==
In 1992, Pochettino played four matches for the Argentina under-23 team at the CONMEBOL Pre-Olympic Tournament in Paraguay, which saw them fail to qualify for the 1992 Summer Olympics.

Pochettino won 20 caps for the full side over a period of four years. He was handed his first senior international by his former manager Bielsa, playing his first match on 31 March 1999 in a friendly against the Netherlands at Amsterdam Arena, ending in a 1–1 draw. Pochettino scored his first goal on 17 November 1999 in another friendly, a 2–0 win over Spain. He was a participant at the 1999 Copa América and the 2002 FIFA World Cup under Bielsa, appearing in three complete matches as the nation were unsuccessful in progressing from the group stage in the latter tournament.

Pochettino's most newsworthy highlight to the competition came during the second group stage match against England, when Italian referee Pierluigi Collina awarded Argentina's opponents a penalty, after the defender brought down Michael Owen in the box. The resulting spot kick was converted by David Beckham for the match's only goal.

== Managerial career ==
=== Espanyol ===
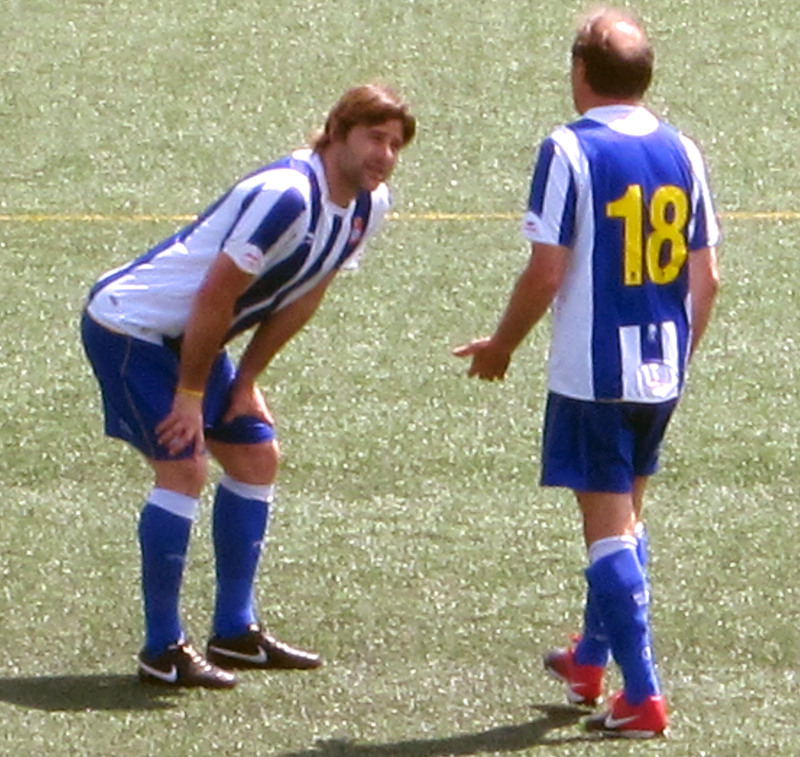
Pochettino (left) playing for Espanyol in a veterans' match in 2011

In late January 2009, Pochettino became Espanyol's third coach of the 2008–09 season, with the team third from the bottom of the table. Tasked with saving them from relegation, he had only just received his UEFA Pro License in December 2008 and had spent a short spell as the assistant coach to the women's team but was otherwise untested as a coach. His first match was at home to neighbouring Barcelona, coached by Pep Guardiola, in the quarter-finals of the Copa del Rey. Despite his players' reluctance and only being able to avail themselves of two training sessions prior to the game, his system of high pressing and one-on-one defensive cover yielded an unexpected 0–0 draw. After he had asked for "divine intervention", the side's fortunes improved and they eventually finished the season comfortably mid-table with their most significant result being a 2–1 victory in the league derby against Barcelona, their first in the competition at the Camp Nou for 27 years. He coached nine players who were his teammates during his last active year and, in early June, renewed his contract for a further three years.

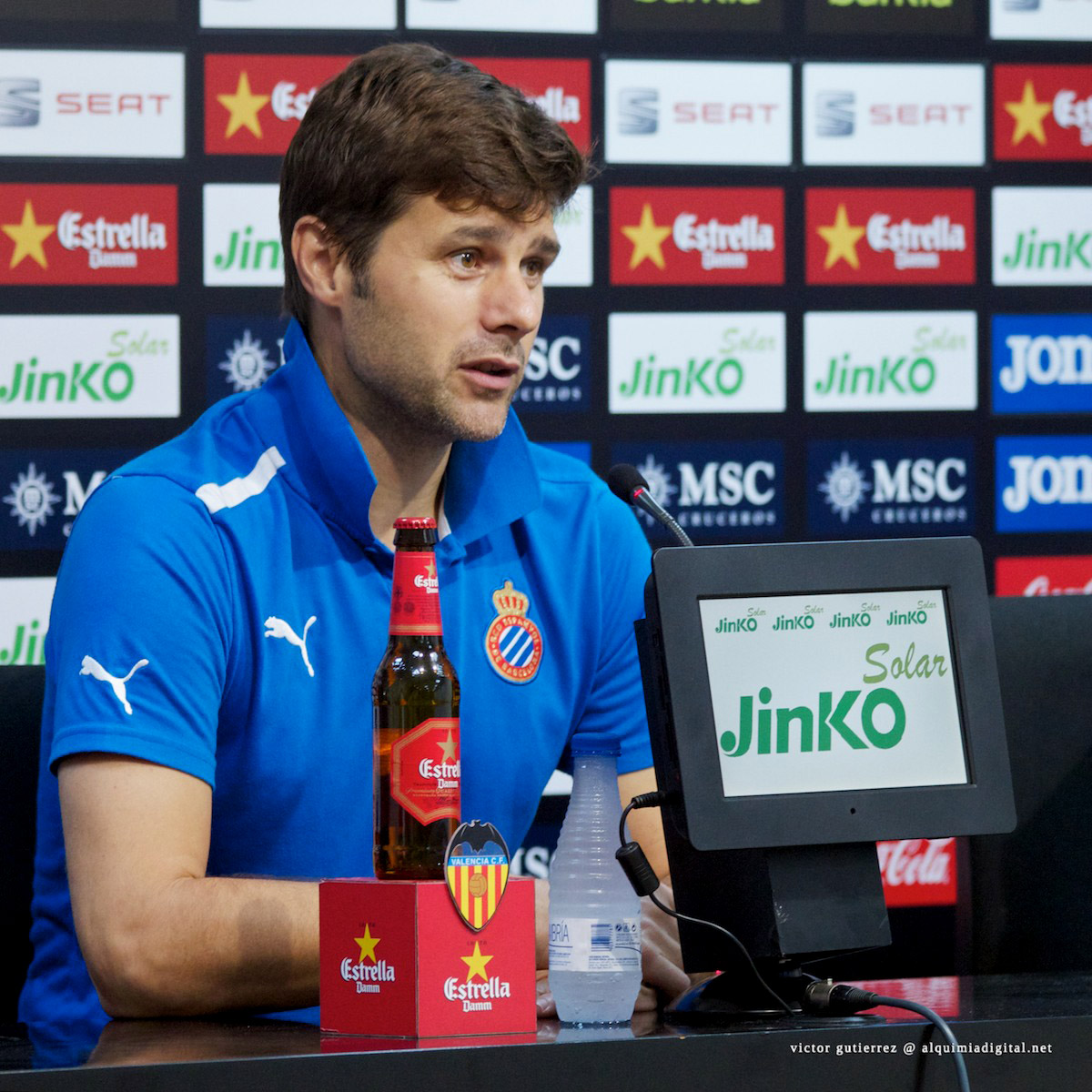
Pochettino as coach of Espanyol in 2012

In 2009–10, Pochettino once again led Espanyol to a comfortable league position, in a campaign where club captain (and his former teammate) Raúl Tamudo fell out of favour, particularly after the January 2010 arrival of the coach's compatriot Dani Osvaldo. On 28 September 2010, he agreed to a one-year extension at the Estadi Cornellà-El Prat which ran until 30 June 2012, and in May of the following year further renewed his contract until 2014. On 26 November 2012, however, following a 0–2 home loss against Getafe that left the team in last place with just nine points from 13 matches and with the manager complaining about the financial restrictions being placed upon him, his contract was terminated by mutual consent at the end of that month.

Despite the lowly league position, Pochettino's work had drawn praise from commentators and he was beginning to display the characteristics that would inform his coaching at his subsequent clubs, namely the imposition of a specific tactical style on all of the clubs' team from the senior side down to youth level, attending training sessions to receive updates from all levels, a preference for 4–2–3–1, a focus on a high-pressing game and the promotion of players from the academy to the first team.

=== Southampton ===
On 18 January 2013, Pochettino was announced as the new first-team manager of Premier League club Southampton, replacing Nigel Adkins and becoming the second Argentine manager in English football after Osvaldo Ardiles. His first match in charge was five days later, a 0–0 draw against Everton at St Mary's Stadium. He recorded his first win on 9 February, 3–1 at home over reigning champions Manchester City.

Despite having some knowledge of English, Pochettino initially used a Spanish interpreter in press conferences as a way to fully express himself. He led the Saints to notable victories against other top league sides, including a 3–1 home win over Liverpool and a 2–1 success against Chelsea also at St Mary's.

In his first full season at Southampton, Pochettino led the team to an eighth-place finish, their highest league position since 2002–03, while also recording their highest points tally since the Premier League began in 1992–93.

=== Tottenham Hotspur ===
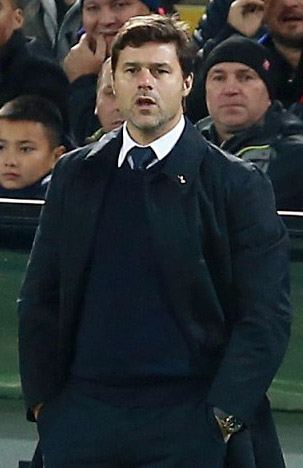
Pochettino as manager of Tottenham Hotspur in 2016

On 27 May 2014, Pochettino was appointed head coach of Tottenham Hotspur on a five-year contract, becoming their tenth manager over a 12-year span. The following 28 January, the team reached the final of the League Cup following a 3–2 aggregate win over Sheffield United, only to be beaten 2–0 by Chelsea in the decisive game at Wembley. In the domestic league, Pochettino's first season was generally successful, ending in a fifth-place finish and the conversion of several young academy players into regular first-team players; he put one of those graduates, Harry Kane, as starting striker at the expense of Spanish international Roberto Soldado, a gamble which paid off as Kane and his teammates Dele Alli and Eric Dier were touted as the potential basis for the England squad at UEFA Euro 2016.

Tottenham were in contention to win the league in 2015–16, but on 2 May 2016 they drew 2–2 against Chelsea, which confirmed Leicester City as champions. The game at Stamford Bridge saw Tottenham receive a league record nine yellow cards, and Pochettino entered the pitch in the first half to separate his left back Danny Rose from a confrontation with Chelsea winger Willian. Spurs also lost in their last match of the season, ceding the league runners-up spot to rivals Arsenal – it was still good enough for their highest league finish since 1990.

On 12 May 2016, Pochettino agreed to an extension of his contract, committing him to the club until 2021, and it was also confirmed that his title had changed from that of "head coach" to "manager", although he confirmed that the role itself was no different. The campaign began with a series of 12 unbeaten league matches that ended with an away defeat at Chelsea in late November. However, inconsistencies saw Tottenham being eliminated from Champions League and League Cup contention, as well as that falling some way behind the leaders Chelsea who had a run of 13 wins (ended by a loss to Tottenham in January 2017).

Pochettino's side eventually finished in second place with 86 points, their highest-ever tally since the English League began under the new denomination, their highest ranking in 54 years since 1962–63 under Bill Nicholson and the first season-long unbeaten home run in 52 years since 1964–65.

On 24 May 2018, Pochettino signed a new five-year contract to keep him at Tottenham until 2023. In December 2018, Pochettino won his 100th Premier League match as manager of the club, after a late victory against Burnley; he became the first Tottenham manager to reach this milestone and the third fastest Premier League manager to achieve the feat with a single club. On 8 May 2019, Pochettino led Tottenham to their first ever Champions League final after defeating Ajax on away goals (3–3 aggregate), with his side coming back from a 2–0 deficit (3–0 aggregate) at half-time in Amsterdam and Lucas Moura scoring a second-half hat-trick. The final in Madrid ended in a 2–0 defeat to Liverpool.

Five months after the Champions League final, on 19 November 2019, Pochettino was sacked by Tottenham Hotspur with the side 14th in the Premier League standings. Chairman Daniel Levy cited the "extremely disappointing" domestic results as the reason behind the dismissal. Pochettino was succeeded by José Mourinho.

=== Paris Saint-Germain ===
On 2 January 2021, Pochettino was appointed as the head coach of Paris Saint-Germain on an 18-month contract, where he had spent two years during his playing career, replacing Thomas Tuchel. His first match in charge was four days later, a 1–1 league draw at Saint-Étienne. On 9 January, Pochettino won his first game with a 3–0 home defeat of Brest. Four days later, he won the first honour of his managerial career as Paris Saint-Germain defeated rivals Marseille 2–1 in the French Super Cup.

On 16 February 2021, Pochettino took charge of his first Champions League match with the Parisians, guiding them to a 4–1 win over Barcelona at the Camp Nou in the first leg of the round of 16 tie. This marked Pochettino's first European victory as Paris Saint-Germain coach. In the quarter-finals, PSG won against the defending champions Bayern Munich on away goals, due to a 3–2 victory at the Allianz Arena. However, PSG lost in both legs of the semi-finals against Manchester City. Pochettino's team finished the season with a win in the Coupe de France final against Monaco and as runners-up in the Ligue 1, a point behind Lille. In July 2021, he extended his contract until 2023. In the 2021–22 season, Pochettino won his first Ligue 1 title. On 5 July 2022, it was announced that Paris Saint-Germain had parted ways with Pochettino.

=== Chelsea ===
On 29 May 2023, it was announced Pochettino would be appointed as head coach of Chelsea on 1 July 2023, on a two-year contract with an option to extend for another year. His first match in charge was against Liverpool at Stamford Bridge on 13 August 2023, which ended in a 1–1 draw. His first win as the manager of Chelsea was against Luton Town on 25 August 2023, which ended in a 3–0 win, with a brace from Raheem Sterling and a first goal for Chelsea from Nicolas Jackson. He guided Chelsea to the League Cup final after beating Newcastle United on penalties in the quarter final and a 6–2 win on aggregate over Middlesbrough in the semi-final, but Chelsea lost the final 1–0 to Liverpool in extra time, after Virgil van Dijk scored an 118-minute winner to win their tenth title; it marked Chelsea's sixth consecutive Wembley final defeat. On 2 May 2024, Pochettino marked his 400th game as a manager in English football with a 2–0 victory over his former club Tottenham, with goals from Jackson and Trevoh Chalobah.

After winning all five of their remaining Premier League games of the season, Chelsea finished sixth in the league and qualified for European football for next season. Despite this, on 21 May 2024, two days after the final game of the season, Chelsea announced that they had mutually agreed to part ways with Pochettino. Pochettino had clashed over strategy and squad management with Laurence Stewart and Paul Winstanley, the two sporting directors and recruitment specialists backed by the owners to oversee a new club structure. He had seen his request for adding experienced leaders to a young and immature squad turned down, and opposed the plan for selling the academy graduates Chalobah and Conor Gallagher in the summer of 2024 to make up for expensive 2023 signings under the Premier League's profit and sustainability regulations. He had also resented the decision to establish a specialised set-piece department with Bernardo Cueva from 2024 to 2025. The management, in turn, had criticised Pochettino's training methods as "antiquated" and declared interest in "a young, progressive coach willing to buy into their way of working".

=== United States ===
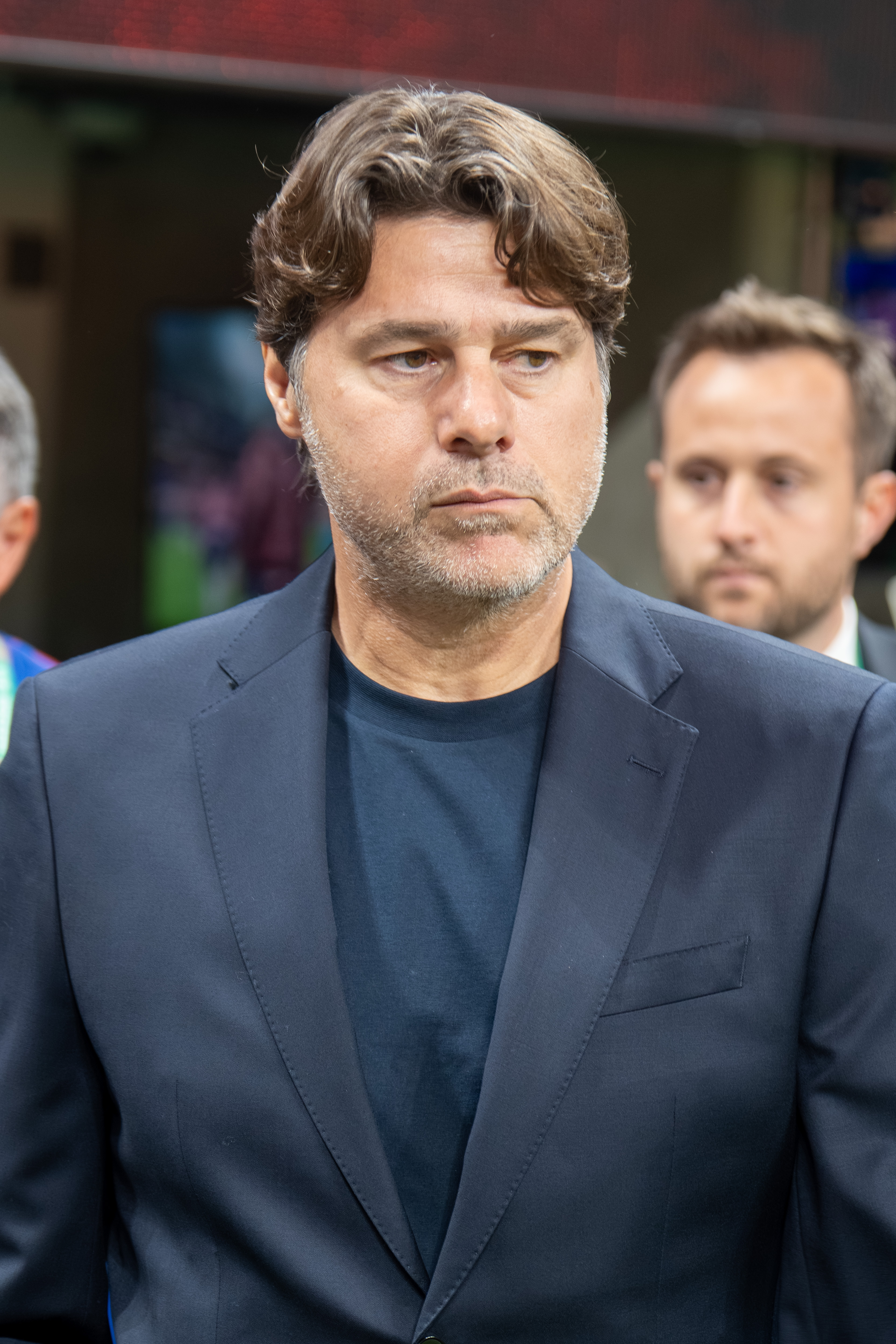
Pochettino as head coach of the United States national team in 2026

On 10 September 2024, Pochettino was announced as the new head coach of the United States national team, succeeding previous coach Gregg Berhalter who was dismissed after the 2024 Copa América. Pochettino's salary was partly compensated by donations from hedge fund manager and supporter of U.S. soccer initiatives Ken Griffin, co-founder of Diameter Capital Scott Goodwin, and other commercial partners. According to news reports, it was estimated that Pochettino would earn roughly $6 million per year, making him one of the highest paid national team coaches in the world. Pochettino cited the U.S. as hosts for the 2026 FIFA World Cup, talented player pool, potential for growth of soccer in the country, and former colleagues Matt Crocker and Emma Hayes as reasons for taking the job. His first match in charge of the USMNT was a friendly against Panama at Q2 Stadium on 12 October, which ended in a 2–0 win, with goals from Yunus Musah and Ricardo Pepi.

On 15 October, Pochettino lost his first CONCACAF Clásico in an international friendly in Guadalajara. He then won his first two CONCACAF Nations League matches against Jamaica in the quarter-finals in November. The first leg ended in 0–1 to the U.S. and the second in 4–2. Following two victorious friendlies against Costa Rica and Venezuela, the U.S. lost 0–1 to Panama at the Nations League semi-final. Cecilio Waterman scored the only goal at the dying minutes of the game. This was the first time the U.S. had been knocked out of the tournament after a three-peat championship. Three days later the U.S. lost 1–2 to Canada in the third-place match. Pochettino urged fans patience after the disappointing result. The U.S. lost their next two friendlies against Turkey and Switzerland, 1–2 and 0–4 respectively. Pochettino took responsibility for the heavy defeat against Switzerland, saying that it was his choice for the starting XI and wanted the entire team to have minutes.

Following those two defeats, Pochettino entered the 2025 Gold Cup with a relatively inexperienced squad that summer. Many of the usual starters were unavailable due to commitments at the 2025 Club World Cup, injuries, or fatigue. Despite this, the team secured three straight victories against Trinidad and Tobago, Saudi Arabia, and Haiti, topping their group with a perfect record. Pochettino was lauded for bringing the best out of longtime USMNT players like Chris Richards and Malik Tillman as well as integrating new talents Diego Luna, Alex Freeman, and Patrick Agyemang. In the quarterfinals, the U.S. played a thrilling 2–2 match against Costa Rica in which Malik Tillman missed a penalty and Francisco Calvo converted one in regulation time. The match subsequently went to a shootout and the U.S. won 4–3 with Tillman redeeming himself by scoring his penalty and Matt Freese named the man of the match. Pochettino said the team "showed great character" and the win was "priceless". The U.S. next faced a motivated Guatemala who defeated Canada in an upset in the quarterfinals. The match ended 2–1 with Diego Luna scoring a brace and Olger Escobar scoring at the 80th minute after a hard-fought second half. Because the match was attended mainly by Guatemalan fans following their historic entry into the semifinals, Pochettino likened the atmosphere to playing away in Guatemala rather than at home.

The U.S. played Mexico in the final match. Chris Richards scored in the fourth minute off a set piece with a header. The lead only lasted twenty-three minutes as Raúl Jiménez equalized with a strong shot from inside the box. At the 66th minute a controversial decision occurred when Jorge Sánchez palmed the ball inside Mexico's penalty box and Mario Escobar, the referee, judged it was Sánchez's plant hand that struck the ball therefore not a handball nor penalty. Another controversial decision occurred at the 77th minute when Edson Álvarez scored off a set piece that was initially called offside until it was revised by video assistance. The match ended 2–1 to Mexico. Pochettino criticized the decisions, especially the uncalled handball, arguing that if it had occurred on the U.S.'s side, it would have been given. He also said that it was difficult for the referee to disallow a goal by Mexico in front of 70,000 fans as two of their goals had been disallowed in previous rounds.

Automatically qualifying as a host of the 2026 FIFA World Cup in Group D, Pochettino utilized a hybrid 3-4-3 formation in the United States' opening group stage matchup against Paraguay, finishing with a resounding 4–1 victory that was both the highest goalscoring game in U.S. World Cup history, and was tied for the biggest win for the U.S. at a World Cup since 1930. His attacking tactics achieved widespread praise from commentators and pundits alike, particularly for their aggressive pressing, transitions, and fluidity, with some arguing it was the greatest performance in U.S. men's national team history. He led the team to a 2–0 victory in the following group stage game against a heavily defensive Australia, marking the first time the U.S. has won multiple group stage games in 96 years. The U.S. ultimately won Group D in only two games after Paraguay beat Turkey, the quickest to advance in national team history. As winners of Group D and their final group stage opponent Turkey already eliminated, Pochettino rested his regular 10 starters and deployed a heavily rotated bench squad, narrowly losing at the last second 2–3.

In the round of 32 knockout match against Bosnia and Herzegovina he deployed his same lineup from the opening Paraguay match, winning 2–0 after being down a man due to a controversial red card on Folarin Balogun, which was only the second U.S. win in World Cup knockout history and the first since 2002. With the win, Pochettino broke the record of the all-time wins for a U.S. manager at the World Cup with 3 victories. The aforementioned red card was later annulled after the intervention of Donald Trump, a decision which he called "not something extraordinary", and said he celebrated, because the card had been "completely unfair". Balogun's presence against Belgium in the round of 16 match failed to make a difference, however, as the European team achieved a 4–1 win which ended the U.S. run in the tournament.

On 3 August 2026, Pochettino was announced to have a signed a new contract that would keep him as the U.S. head coach through 2030. On September 28, in the first match of the 2030 FIFA World Cup cycle, a 4–1 victory over Peru, where he debuted 8 teenage players including 16 year old Cavan Sullivan and 17 year old Mathis Albert. The following game, Albert became the youngest American to score in national team history in the 4–2 win over Chile, before Sullivan beat his record only four days later in the 3–0 win over rivals Mexico. He finished his first window with a perfect 4–0–0. On November 14, he achieved his largest victory as the U.S. head coach, a 6–0 victory over Haiti in the first leg of the CONCACAF Nations League quarter-finals. On November 17, in his final game with the United States, Pochettino won the second leg 2–0 and qualified the team for the 2027 CONCACAF Nations League Finals, ending his United States national team tenure with a six-game win streak.

=== Manchester United ===
On 13 November 2026, after Manchester United activated Pochettino's national team buyout clause, he signed a two-and-a-half-year deal to replace Michael Carrick, who had been dismissed on 12 November after a disappointing start to the season. He joined the club as head coach on 18 November, after managing his final two games for the United States in the CONCACAF Nations League quarter-finals against Haiti. His first match in charge was a 4–0 defeat against rivals Liverpool at Anfield on 22 November. United conceded two early first-half goals shortly after defender Leny Yoro's eighth-minute dismissal, before going on to concede twice more in the second half. It was the joint-heaviest defeat suffered by a Manchester United manager or head coach in their first game in charge, with Pochettino describing the result as "painful".

== Style of coaching ==
=== Tactical approach ===
Pochettino has cited Marcelo Bielsa, under whom he played at Newell's Old Boys and for the Argentina national football team, as a major influence on his coaching philosophy, describing him as his "football father". His approach is characterised by a high-pressing, attacking style of football, combining possession-based build-up play with quick attacking transitions and coordinated movement in the final third. He has frequently employed a 4–2–3–1 formation, instructing his teams to build from the back, press opponents aggressively and create opportunities through positional movement. During his tenure at Tottenham Hotspur, he developed a flexible attacking system characterised by advanced full-backs providing width, allowing attacking midfielders to occupy central spaces and create numerical advantages. His build-up play often involved a defensive midfielder dropping between the centre-backs to facilitate ball progression, while the centre-forward could retreat into deeper positions to link play and create space for attacking runs behind the opposition's defensive line.

Defensively, Tottenham employed coordinated high pressing and counter-pressing to regain possession quickly, often attempting to force opponents into mistakes in their own half. The team could shift from a 4–2–3–1 into a 4–4–2 defensive shape, with the forwards restricting passing options through central areas. According to a Premier League tactical analysis, Tottenham recorded the lowest passes allowed per defensive action (PPDA) in the league during both the 2015–16 and 2016–17 seasons, reflecting the intensity of their pressing.

Although the 4–2–3–1 remained his preferred formation, Pochettino also experimented with a 3–4–2–1 featuring wing-backs and a 4–1–4–1 midfield structure. He notably employed the latter system in Tottenham's 2–0 victory over Manchester City in October 2016, with a holding midfielder providing defensive cover behind an aggressive collective press. During the 2018–19 season, he increasingly experimented with two-striker formations, including a 4–4–2 diamond, although the system sometimes left the team vulnerable to counter-attacks through wide areas. Tottenham also demonstrated a more cautious defensive approach during their run to the 2019 UEFA Champions League final, occasionally employing a compact mid-block to restrict central passing lanes rather than pressing continuously from the front.

Football journalist Jonathan Wilson noted that Pochettino had developed a more controlled and effective pressing system at Tottenham compared with his earlier approach at Southampton, reflecting his growing tactical maturity. In 2018, Wilson further highlighted Tottenham's tactical flexibility, noting their ability to alternate between high pressing and a deeper defensive approach focused on counter-attacking.

=== Player development and man-management ===
Pochettino is hailed by many pundits for his focus on developing local players from the clubs' youth academies, getting local government and references' support, and a willingness to promote young players in general. It was also noted that many young players under his tutelage went on to play for the England national team, while the manager himself felt that it was his duty to develop English talent, saying: "I feel when I arrived in Spain and now in England in which way can we say 'thank you' to the country that opened the door when I didn't speak English. And how people treated me and my family and my staff which was really well. It's a way to say thank you to the Premier League and the people who trust in you".

Pochettino places considerable emphasis on man-management and the psychological development of players, encouraging them to take responsibility for their own progress. During his time at Tottenham, he encouraged Eric Dier to evaluate his own performances and employed psychological techniques to motivate Harry Kane to take greater responsibility for his development. Former Southampton striker Rickie Lambert credited Pochettino with identifying and improving weaknesses in his game, while Kane praised his willingness to provide guidance and opportunities to young players. Harry Winks similarly credited him with helping improve his physical, technical and mental abilities. Pochettino himself has emphasised the importance of building strong relationships, fostering trust and making individuals feel valued within the team, regarding effective man-management as a central component of successful coaching. Pochettino has also cited former Manchester United manager Alex Ferguson as an inspiration since the beginning of his managerial career. Following a meeting with Ferguson in May 2016, he described their conversation as a valuable learning experience that could help him become a better manager.

Former Tottenham players have described Pochettino as uncompromising in his demands regarding fitness, weight management and punctuality. His training philosophy places considerable physical demands on players, with intensive sessions designed to prepare them for the demands of competitive matches. During his tenures at Southampton and Tottenham, his training regimen included the Gacon test, an intermittent running drill lasting approximately ten minutes, in which players run for 45 seconds and rest for 15 seconds, with the target distance increasing on each successive repetition. Despite his strict expectations, he has generally favoured personal communication and individual accountability over disciplinary fines, seeking to maintain players' trust while holding them responsible for their conduct.

=== Psychological approach and spiritual beliefs ===
Pochettino believes in "energía universal" ("universal energy"), the idea that people, places and things are charged with a hidden energy, positive or negative. "I believe in energía universal", he said. "It is connected. Nothing happens for causality. It is always a consequence [of something else]. Maybe, it is one of the reasons that Harry [Kane] always scores in derbies. I believe in that energy. For me, it exists." In his 2017 book Brave New World, Pochettino also claimed that he could perceive people's auras and foresee the future paths of individual players. He stated that although he relied on data and tests, his ability to sense the flow of energy had a greater influence on his decision-making.

Pochettino has also employed unconventional psychological training methods to develop players' confidence and mental resilience. Ahead of the 2019 UEFA Champions League final, he enlisted motivational coach Xesco Espar to lead team-building exercises in which Tottenham players walked barefoot across hot coals and broke arrows pressed against their throats. Similar exercises had previously been used during his tenure at Southampton in 2013. Pochettino described these activities as a means of overcoming fear, strengthening mental preparation and encouraging players to recognise their perceived limitations. Following Tottenham's 2–0 defeat to Liverpool in the final, Pochettino's extensive psychological preparations attracted scrutiny from several commentators. While some questioned the effectiveness of the motivational exercises after the players appeared nervous and struggled under pressure, others highlighted how the team's early concession of a penalty disrupted their preparations for the match.

Pochettino has also emphasised the psychological benefits of demanding physical training, using the Gacon test to challenge players' mental resilience and their ability to endure physical discomfort.

=== Reception ===
Pochettino has earned a reputation for building strong foundations and fostering long-term development. At Tottenham Hotspur, football commentators credited him with transforming the club's culture and competitive standing, instilling greater work ethic and consistency, and elevating the club from a top-six side into a regular top-four contender despite financial constraints. During his tenure with the United States national team, Pochettino was similarly credited with laying the foundations for long-term development, raising competitive standards, strengthening the team's culture and improving connections between youth and senior national teams.

Despite the acclaim, Pochettino's failure to win a trophy at Tottenham and his record in major matches attracted criticism. His teams lost the 2015 League Cup and 2019 Champions League finals, while critics questioned their ability to perform on decisive occasions. Similar criticism followed his departure, particularly after losing the 2024 League Cup final with Chelsea and the 2025 CONCACAF Gold Cup final with the United States. In 2026, Opta Analyst identified a recurring pattern of struggles against stronger opponents in major matches, despite Pochettino having won domestic honours with Paris Saint-Germain.

In 2016, Pep Guardiola described Pochettino as "one of the best managers in the world", praising the aggressive and proactive style of play employed by his Tottenham side. In 2017, Antonio Conte praised Pochettino for having built "a great base and foundation" at Tottenham, arguing that Chelsea needed to emulate the club's long-term development despite having won the Premier League title the previous season. In 2019, Jürgen Klopp commended Pochettino's gradual development of Tottenham and his ability to keep the squad together, describing his achievements as exceptional despite not winning a title. Following the announcement of Pochettino's departure from the United States national team in 2026, U.S. Soccer CEO JT Batson praised his lasting influence on the organisation, crediting him with raising standards, strengthening its culture and improving connections between youth and senior national teams. He stated that "Those changes are now embedded in how we operate."

== Personal life ==
Pochettino is married to fellow Argentine Karina Grippaldi. They have two sons, Sebastiano and Maurizio, both footballers. Sebastiano works under his father as a fitness coach and has been part of his father's team since his tenure at Tottenham. Maurizio plays for Andorran club Inter Club d'Escaldes. Pochettino holds Argentine and Spanish citizenship.

== Career statistics ==
=== Club ===
Appearances and goals by club, season and competition
Club	Season	League			National cup (Note: Includes Copa del Rey, Coupe de France)		League cup (Note: Includes Coupe de la Ligue)		Continental		Total	
Club	Season	Division	Apps	Goals	Apps	Goals	Apps	Goals	Apps	Goals	Apps	Goals
Newell's Old Boys	1988–89	Primera División	4	0	—		—		—		4	0
Newell's Old Boys	1989–90	Primera División	30	0	—		—		—		30	0
Newell's Old Boys	1990–91	Primera División	34	4	—		—		—		34	4
Newell's Old Boys	1991–92	Primera División	28	3	—		—		—		28	3
Newell's Old Boys	1992–93	Primera División	32	1	—		—		—		32	1
Newell's Old Boys	1993–94	Primera División	25	0	—		—		—		25	0
Newell's Old Boys	Total		153	8	—		—		—		153	8
Espanyol	1994–95	La Liga	34	0	1	0	—		—		35	0
Espanyol	1995–96	La Liga	39	3	9	0	—		—		48	3
Espanyol	1996–97	La Liga	37	3	6	0	—		4 (Note: Appearances in UEFA Cup)	0	47	3
Espanyol	1997–98	La Liga	35	2	0	0	—		—		35	2
Espanyol	1998–99	La Liga	26	0	3	1	—		—		29	1
Espanyol	1999–2000	La Liga	29	1	7	0	—		—		36	1
Espanyol	2000–01	La Liga	16	2	2	0	—		6	0	24	2
Espanyol	Total		216	11	28	1	—		10	0	254	12
Paris Saint-Germain	2000–01	Division 1	7	1	1	0	—		—		8	1
Paris Saint-Germain	2001–02	Division 1	28	1	2	0	2	0	10	0	42	1
Paris Saint-Germain	2002–03	Ligue 1	35	2	0	0	5	1	5	1	45	4
Paris Saint-Germain	Total		70	4	3	0	7	1	15	1	95	6
Bordeaux	2003–04	Ligue 1	11	1	1	0	0	0	4	0	16	1
Espanyol	2003–04	La Liga	21	1	0	0	—		—		21	1
Espanyol	2004–05	La Liga	27	1	0	0	—		—		27	1
Espanyol	2005–06	La Liga	11	0	2	0	—		3	1	16	1
Espanyol	Total		59	2	2	0	—		3	1	64	3
Career total			509	26	34	1	7	1	32	2	582	30

=== International ===
Appearances and goals by national team and year
National team	Year	Apps	Goals
Argentina	1999	6	1
Argentina	2000	2	0
Argentina	2001	6	1
Argentina	2002	6	0
Total		20	2

Argentina score listed first, score column indicates score after each Pochettino goal.

List of international goals scored by Mauricio Pochettino
No.	Date	Venue	Cap	Opponent	Score	Result	Competition	Ref.
1	17 November 1999	Estadio La Cartuja, Seville, Spain	6	Spain	2–0	2–0	Friendly	
2	7 October 2001	Estadio Defensores del Chaco, Asunción, Paraguay	12	Paraguay	1–1	2–2	2002 FIFA World Cup qualification	

== Managerial statistics ==
As of match played 22 November 2026

Managerial record by team and tenure
Team	From	To	Record					Ref.
Team	From	To	G	W	D	L	Win %	Ref.
Espanyol	20 January 2009	26 November 2012	161	53	38	70	32.92	
Southampton	18 January 2013	27 May 2014	60	23	18	19	38.33	
Tottenham Hotspur	27 May 2014	19 November 2019	293	160	60	73	54.61	
Paris Saint-Germain	2 January 2021	5 July 2022	84	55	15	14	65.48	
Chelsea	1 July 2023	21 May 2024	51	26	11	14	50.98	
United States	10 September 2024	17 November 2026	37	23	2	12	62.16	
Manchester United	18 November 2026	present	1	0	0	1	0.00	
Career total			688	339	146	203	49.27	

== Honours ==
=== Player ===
Newell's Old Boys

- Primera División: 1990–91, Clausura 1992

Espanyol

- Copa del Rey: 1999–2000, 2005–06

Paris Saint-Germain

- UEFA Intertoto Cup: 2001

=== Manager ===
Tottenham Hotspur

- EFL Cup runner-up: 2014–15
- UEFA Champions League runner-up: 2018–19

Paris Saint-Germain

- Ligue 1: 2021–22
- Coupe de France: 2020–21
- Trophée des Champions: 2020, runner-up: 2021

Chelsea

- EFL Cup runner-up: 2023–24

United States

- CONCACAF Gold Cup runner-up: 2025

Individual

- London Football Awards Manager of the Year: 2018–19
