= Sebastiano Pochettino =

Spanish football manager

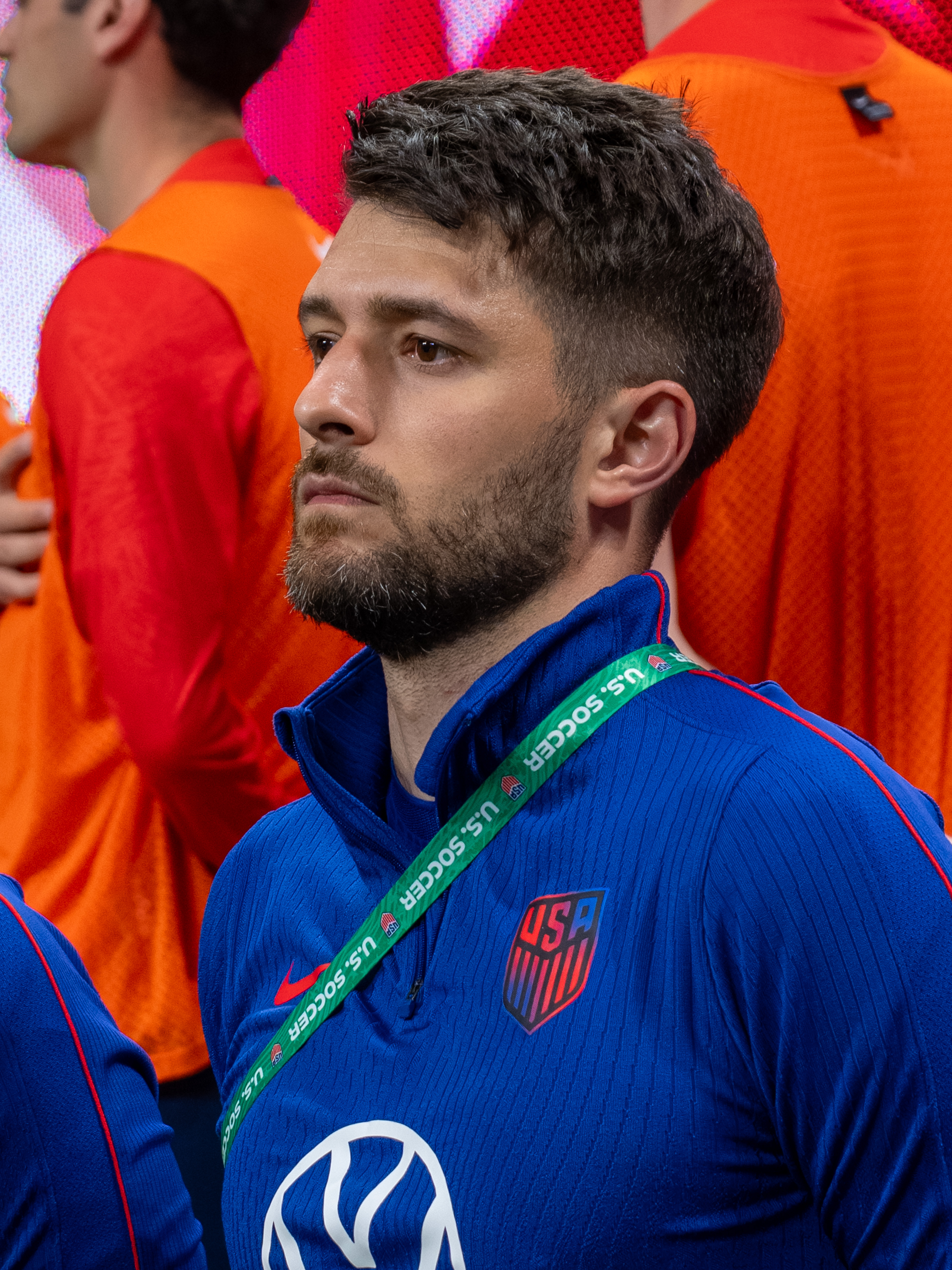

Personal information
- Full name: Sebastiano Pochettino Grippaldi
- Date of birth: 24 January 1995 (age 31)
- Place of birth: Barcelona, Spain

Team information
- Current team: Manchester United (sports scientist)

Sebastiano Pochettino Grippaldi (born 24 January 1995) is a Spanish-Argentine football coach who is currently a sports scientist at Premier League club Manchester United.

== Early life ==
Pochettino attended St. Paul's School in Barcelona, Spain. He is the son of the Argentine football manager Mauricio Pochettino, and the brother of the footballer Maurizio Pochettino.

== Career ==
In 2017, Pochettino was appointed fitness coach and sports scientist of English side Tottenham, becoming the youngest sports scientist in the Premier League. He was described as "a regular sight in training sessions and on match days, seen putting the players through their paces and among the substitutes as they warmed up... a popular figure among the Tottenham players". He joined Chelsea in 2023 and left on 21 May 2024 with his father. He joined his father on the staff of the U.S. men's national team in September 2024.

== Personal life ==
Pochettino is of Italian-Argentine descent through both parents. He can speak English, French, and Spanish.
