= Murphy, Santa Fe =

Murphy
- Town
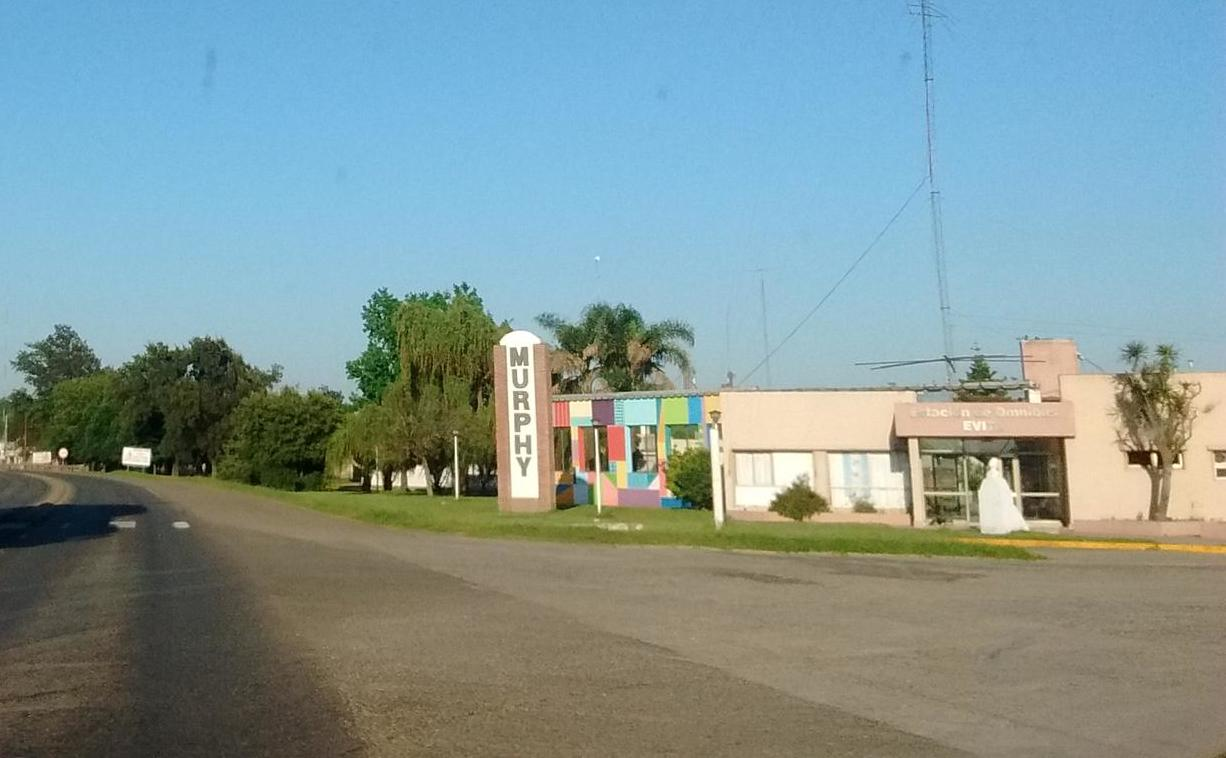

- Location of Murphy in Argentina
- Coordinates: 33°38′40″S 61°51′30″W
- Country: Argentina
- Province: Santa Fe
- Department: General López Department

Government
  - Communal President: Hugo Rodríguez (UCR)

Population
  - Total: 3,540
- Demonym: murfiense
- Time zone: UTC−3 (ART)
- CPA base: S2601
- Dialing code: +54 3462

Murphy is a town in the General López Department in Santa Fe Province, Argentina.

Murphy is named after an Irishman, John James Murphy, from Haysland, near Kilrane, County Wexford, close to Rosslare Harbour. Born in 1822 into a Catholic family, Murphy was an unmarried son of middle-class tenant farmers, who decided to emigrate to better his prospects. He sailed to Buenos Aires, then headed to the pampas to find farm work. Murphy initially found employment digging boundary ditches to separate neighbouring sheep farms, became a tenant sheep farmer, then acquired land of his own in the Salto area. He expanded his holdings and later acquired huge tracts of land in the vicinity of Rojas, Buenos Aires and later in Santa Fe Province. By the time of his death in 1909 he was hugely wealthy. In 1911, the expansion of the railway system led to the compulsory purchase of land near Rosario, held by Murphy's heirs. Estación Murphy was established, and the town that grew up around the station was named Murphy in 1966.

== Sports clubs ==
- Club Centro Recreativo Unión y Cultura
- Club Agrario Los Leones
- Social y Deportivo Murphy Football Club

== Notable people ==
- Paulo Gazzaniga - goalkeeper for Girona FC
- Mauricio Pochettino - football manager, current head coach of Manchester United
