= Gregg Berhalter =

American soccer coach (born 1973)

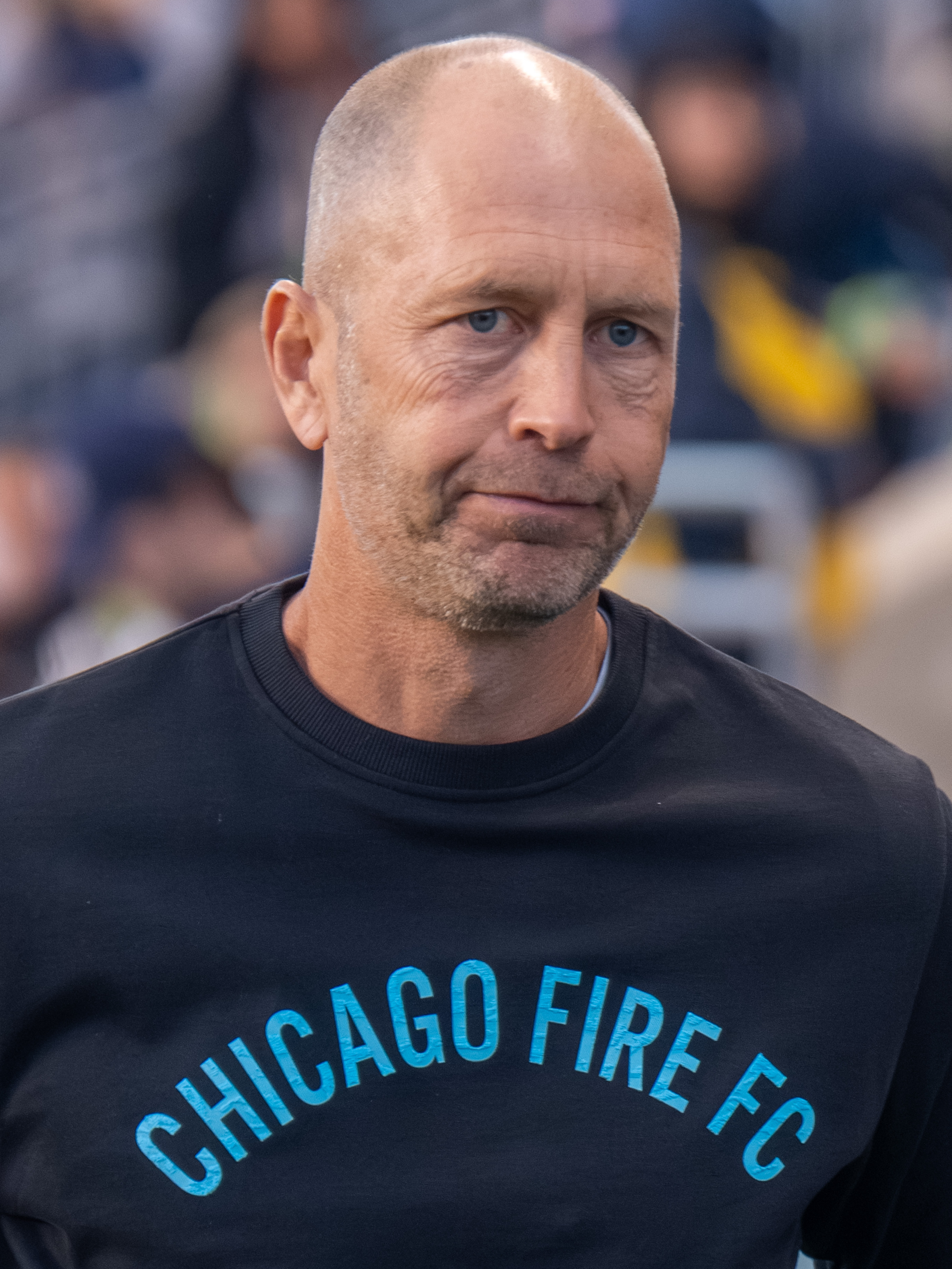
- Berhalter in 2025

Personal information
- Full name: Gregg Matthew Berhalter
- Date of birth: August 1, 1973 (age 53)
- Place of birth: Englewood, New Jersey, U.S.
- Height: 6 ft 1 in (1.85 m)
- Position: Center-back

Team information
- Current team: Chicago Fire (head coach)

College career
Years	Team	Apps	(Gls)
1991–1994	North Carolina	58	(13)

Senior career*
Years	Team	Apps	(Gls)
1993	Raleigh Flyers		
1994–1996	Zwolle	37	(2)
1996–1998	Sparta Rotterdam	10	(0)
1998–2000	Cambuur	56	(2)
2001–2002	Crystal Palace	19	(1)
2002–2006	Energie Cottbus	111	(9)
2006–2009	1860 Munich	73	(8)
2009–2011	LA Galaxy	52	(0)
Total		358	(22)

International career
1993	United States U20	4	(0)
1994–2006	United States	44	(0)

Managerial career
- 2011–2013: Hammarby
- 2013–2018: Columbus Crew
- 2018–2022: United States
- 2023–2024: United States
- 2024–: Chicago Fire
Medal record
Men's Soccer
Representing United States (as player)
CONCACAF Gold Cup
Runner-up	1998
FIFA Confederations Cup
Third place	1999
Representing United States (as manager)
CONCACAF Gold Cup
Winner	2021
Runner-up	2019
CONCACAF Nations League
Winner	2021
Winner	2024
- * Club domestic league appearances and goals

Gregg Matthew Berhalter (/ˈbɜːrˌhɔːltər/, BUR-hawl-tər; born August 1, 1973) is an American soccer coach and former player. He is the current head coach and director of football for Major League Soccer club Chicago Fire, a role he assumed following the end of the 2024 season. From 2018 to 2022 and 2023–24, he was the head coach of the United States men's national soccer team. He is the first person in U.S. history to participate in the FIFA World Cup as both a player and head coach. His tenure as coach has been noted for the recruitment of a younger player roster.

He originally served in the role from 2018 to 2022; following the expiration of his contract, U.S. Soccer employed interim head coaches before rehiring him to the post on June 16, 2023. His tenure with United States men's national team ended a week after the team's early elimination in the 2024 Copa América group stage, as the team's performance in the tournament they hosted was perceived as a disappointment. Berhalter previously coached Columbus Crew in Major League Soccer, Hammarby in Sweden and served as an assistant coach for LA Galaxy.

== Playing career ==
=== Early life and education ===
Gregg Matthew Berhalter was born on August 1, 1973, in Englewood, New Jersey, and grew up in Tenafly, New Jersey, and was a high school teammate of Claudio Reyna at Saint Benedict's Preparatory School in Newark, New Jersey. He played college soccer for the North Carolina Tar Heels at the University of North Carolina at Chapel Hill. In 2002, he was ranked as one of the top 50 players in the history of the Atlantic Coast Conference. In 1993, he spent the collegiate off season playing for the Raleigh Flyers of the USISL. Berhalter is the godson of Boston Red Sox Hall of Fame baseball player Carl Yastrzemski.

=== Professional ===
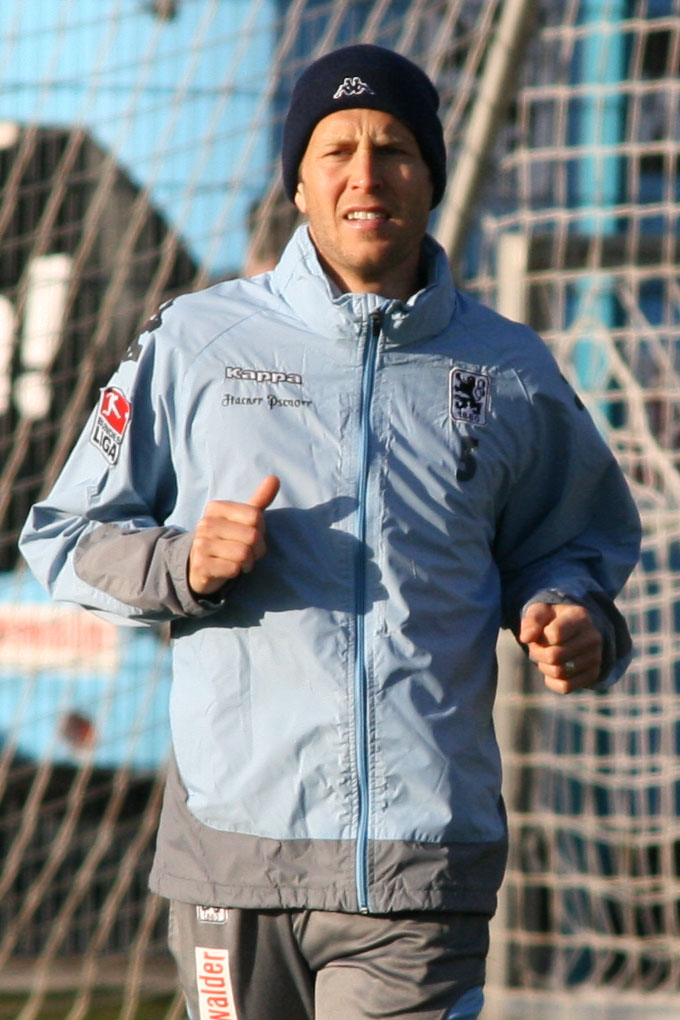
Berhalter with 1860 Munich in 2007

Berhalter left UNC after his junior year, signing with Dutch club Zwolle in 1994. He later played for Sparta Rotterdam and Cambuur in the Netherlands (later they also had U.S.-born executive Alex Pama there), and with Crystal Palace in England (where he briefly played alongside Jovan Kirovski). During his time at Crystal Palace, he scored once against Bradford City.

In 2002, Berhalter signed with Energie Cottbus of the German Bundesliga. He went on to make 111 league appearances with the team, captaining them to a promotion back to the Bundesliga. In 2006, Berhalter signed with 1860 Munich of the 2. Bundesliga, and was named captain of the team. He stayed there for a further two and a half years, making 73 league appearances for Die Löwen.

After a 15-year career in Europe, Berhalter moved back to the United States in April 2009. He signed a contract with Major League Soccer, his first club contract in his home country. He was revealed as a Los Angeles Galaxy player on April 3, 2009. In his first season with the Galaxy, their goals against were cut in half—from 61 to 30—with Berhalter being a leader in defense while mentoring Omar Gonzalez to Rookie of the Year honors.

On November 14, 2009, he scored in the 103rd minute of the scoreless Western Conference final, propelling the Galaxy to a 2–0 win over the Houston Dynamo and into the 2009 MLS Cup. It was his first goal in 28 appearances with the club.

In his second season, the Galaxy won the MLS Supporters Shield and further reduced their goals against to 26 for the season, a Galaxy record.

On October 12, 2011, Berhalter announced his decision to retire at the end of the 2011 MLS season. In 2011, LA Galaxy won both the Supporters Shield and MLS Cup in Berhalter's final season.

=== International ===
Berhalter earned his first cap for the U.S. national team on October 15, 1994, against Saudi Arabia. He went on to play at the 1995 Copa América and the 1999 FIFA Confederations Cup.

Berhalter played a significant role for the U.S. at the 2002 World Cup, stepping in for the injured Jeff Agoos and starting the last two games against Mexico and Germany, and in doing so became the first Crystal Palace player to play in a World Cup match.

On May 25, 2006, Berhalter was added to the U.S. national team's roster for the 2006 World Cup, replacing the injured Cory Gibbs. Berhalter expressed confidence in the ability of the team in the run up to the tournament, but was an unused substitute in all three group games. The U.S. was eliminated after finishing at the bottom of Group E in the first round with one draw and two defeats.

== Coaching career ==
=== Hammarby ===
Following a season as Los Angeles Galaxy's assistant coach, Berhalter was named head coach for Swedish club Hammarby on December 12, 2011. Berhalter became the first American-born manager to manage a professional team in Europe. In his first year, Hammarby improved seven positions in the standing, narrowly missing out on promotion. Berhalter was fired on July 24, 2013, for a "lack of attacking play". Hammarby were in fifth place at the time of the sacking.

=== Columbus Crew ===
Berhalter became the sporting director and head coach of Columbus Crew on November 6, 2013.

Under Berhalter, Columbus Crew qualified for the playoffs four out of five years, in 2014, 2015, 2017, and 2018. They reached MLS Cup 2015 but lost at home 2–1 to the Portland Timbers.

=== United States ===
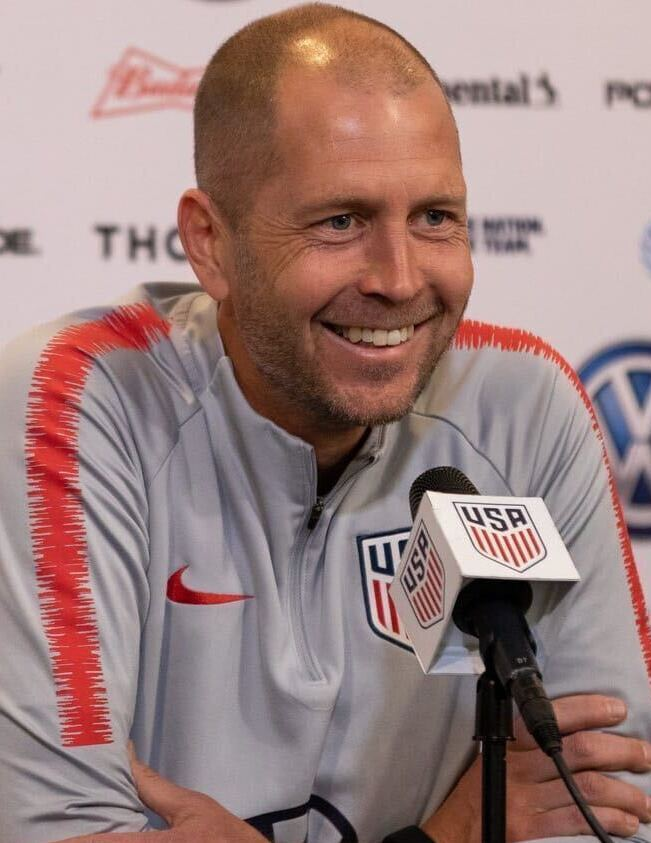
Berhalter in 2019.

On December 2, 2018, Berhalter became the head coach of the United States national team (USMNT). He earned his first victory as coach in a friendly match against Panama on January 27, 2019. Berhalter won the first four games of his coaching career. He coached the United States to two continental championships by winning the inaugural Nations League title against Mexico in June 2021, and then defeating Mexico again 1–0 on August 1, 2021, at the 2021 CONCACAF Gold Cup. On November 12, 2021, Berhalter led the United States to a 2–0 victory over rival Mexico in World Cup Qualifying at TQL Stadium in Cincinnati, Ohio. The team subsequently qualified for and reached the round of 16 in the 2022 FIFA World Cup. This made Berhalter the first American in history to participate in the FIFA World Cup as both a head coach and a player.

As coach of the USMNT, Berhalter has built a roster of young players including Christian Pulisic, Tyler Adams, Yunus Musah, Folarin Balogun, Sergiño Dest, Antonee Robinson and Weston McKennie. Sportswriters such as Sports Illustrated's Brian Straus, The Guardian's Nancy Armour and The Athletic's Paul Tenorio have described this as part of an overarching strategy to develop a pool of young soccer talent in the United States in preparation for the 2026 FIFA World Cup. Berhalter is also credited with developing a stronger team culture in the USMNT. He prefers to use a possession-based play style with a 4-3-3 formation, which has gradually adapted into a more aggressive, forward-moving style of play over the course of his tenure.

Berhalter's contract expired on December 31, 2022, with assistant Anthony Hudson named interim head coach while a search for a permanent replacement commenced. Hudson remained in charge through May 2023 before leaving to become the head coach of Al-Markhiya in Qatar; he was replaced by fellow assistant B.J. Callaghan.

On June 16, 2023, U.S. Soccer announced that Berhalter would return as the head coach of the United States through the 2026 FIFA World Cup. Sporting director Matt Crocker cited Berhalter's "vision, as well as the experience and growth mindset on and off the field to move [the] team forward" as the U.S. prepares to host the 2026 World Cup with Mexico and Canada.

On July 10, 2024, Berhalter was relieved of his duties as the US men's national team head coach after the early exit in the 2024 Copa America group stage. He led the team to a 44–17–13 record and titles in the Nations League and Gold Cup.

=== Chicago Fire ===
On October 8, 2024, Berhalter was named head coach and director of football for MLS club Chicago Fire starting from the 2025 season. Under Berhalter's leadership, Chicago Fire FC made it to the Audi 2025 MLS Cup Playoffs, after an eight year postseason drought.

== Personal life ==
Berhalter lives in the Lake View neighborhood of Chicago with his wife Rosalind, with whom he has four children. He met Rosalind while they were in college at the University of North Carolina at Chapel Hill, where she was playing for the women's soccer team. His son, Sebastian, plays for Middlesbrough Football Club and the United States national team.

In March 2023, an investigation by the United States Soccer Federation (USSF) found that Claudio Reyna and his wife Danielle had attempted to retaliate against Berhalter because their son Giovanni was receiving limited playing time at the 2022 World Cup. The Reynas were also frustrated by comments made after the Cup about the poor behavior of an anonymous player, who was later revealed to be Giovanni. Danielle Reyna attempted to damage Berhalter's career by contacting USSF sporting director Earnie Stewart and USMNT general manager Brian McBride about a fight between Berhalter and his future wife in 1992. A USSF probe into the claim found that it was an isolated incident and found no reason not to employ Berhalter as coach.

== Coaching statistics ==
As of match played 7 November 2026

Coaching record by team and tenure
Team	Nat	From	To	Record							
Team	Nat	From	To	G	W	D	L	GF	GA	GD	Win %
Hammarby	(Sweden)	December 12, 2011	July 24, 2013	46	18	17	11	53	44	+9	39.13
Columbus Crew	(United States)	November 6, 2013	December 2, 2018	193	74	49	70	287	282	+5	38.34
United States	(United States)	December 2, 2018	December 31, 2022	60	37	12	11	118	40	+78	61.67
United States	(United States)	August 1, 2023	July 10, 2024	14	7	1	6	26	16	+10	50.00
Chicago Fire	(United States)	October 24, 2024	present	80	38	16	26	156	131	+25	47.50
Total				393	174	95	124	640	513	+127	44.27

== Honors ==
=== Player ===
LA Galaxy

- Supporters' Shield: 2010, 2011
- MLS Cup: 2011

=== Coach ===
United States

- CONCACAF Nations League: 2019–20, 2023–24
- CONCACAF Gold Cup: 2021
