= Danielle Reyna =

American soccer player (born 1973)

Personal information
- Full name: Danielle Marie Reyna
- Birth name: Danielle Marie Egan
- Date of birth: August 28, 1973 (age 53)
- Place of birth: West Islip, New York, United States
- Height: 5 ft 6 in (1.68 m)
- Position: Midfielder

College career
Years	Team	Apps	(Gls)
1991–1994	North Carolina Tar Heels		

International career
1993	United States	6	(1)

Danielle Marie Reyna (née Egan; born August 28, 1973) is an American former soccer player. She played six times for the United States women's national team in 1993. She married soccer player Claudio Reyna in 1997.

== College career ==
Reyna played for North Carolina Tar Heels under coach Anson Dorrance and alongside Mia Hamm, Tisha Venturini and Kristine Lilly.

== International career ==
In 1993, Reyna made six appearances, all starts, for the senior United States women's team. She scored one goal, the first in a 6–0 win over Australia in Hamilton, Ontario, on July 7, 1993.

== Personal life ==
Reyna is of Irish descent. She married Claudio Reyna, then a member of the U.S. men's national team, in July 1997, one week after he attended the FIFA All-Star Game in Hong Kong and two weeks after the United States men's team's World Cup qualifier at El Salvador. They have had four children: Jack (1999–2012), Giovanni (born in 2002 and named after Giovanni van Bronckhorst, Reyna's good friend and former colleague at Rangers), Joah, and Carolina. Reyna's 13-year-old son Jack died in July 2012 after suffering from cancer. The family lived in Bedford, New York, until Claudio was hired as the sporting director for Austin FC in November 2019. Carolina attends St. Stephen's Episcopal School and was selected to the United States women's national under-17 soccer team for the 2026 FIFA U-17 Women's World Cup.

=== Gregg Berhalter domestic violence controversy ===
In January 2023, ESPN reported that Reyna told U.S. soccer officials about a past domestic violence incident involving head coach Gregg Berhalter "because she was frustrated by comments made about her son after the team's elimination from the 2022 World Cup." A subsequent report by the law firm Alston & Bird revealed that it was after her son did not get to play in the first World Cup game against Wales, that Reyna began hinting that she had information that could harm Berhalter. Reyna initially spoke on the phone with Alston & Bird but then refused to be interviewed.

Her actions have been criticized by former U.S. soccer players and the media as attempted blackmail and a case of American athletic elitism.
