= Kilrane =

Village in County Wexford, Ireland

Kilrane Irish: Cill Ruáin
- Village
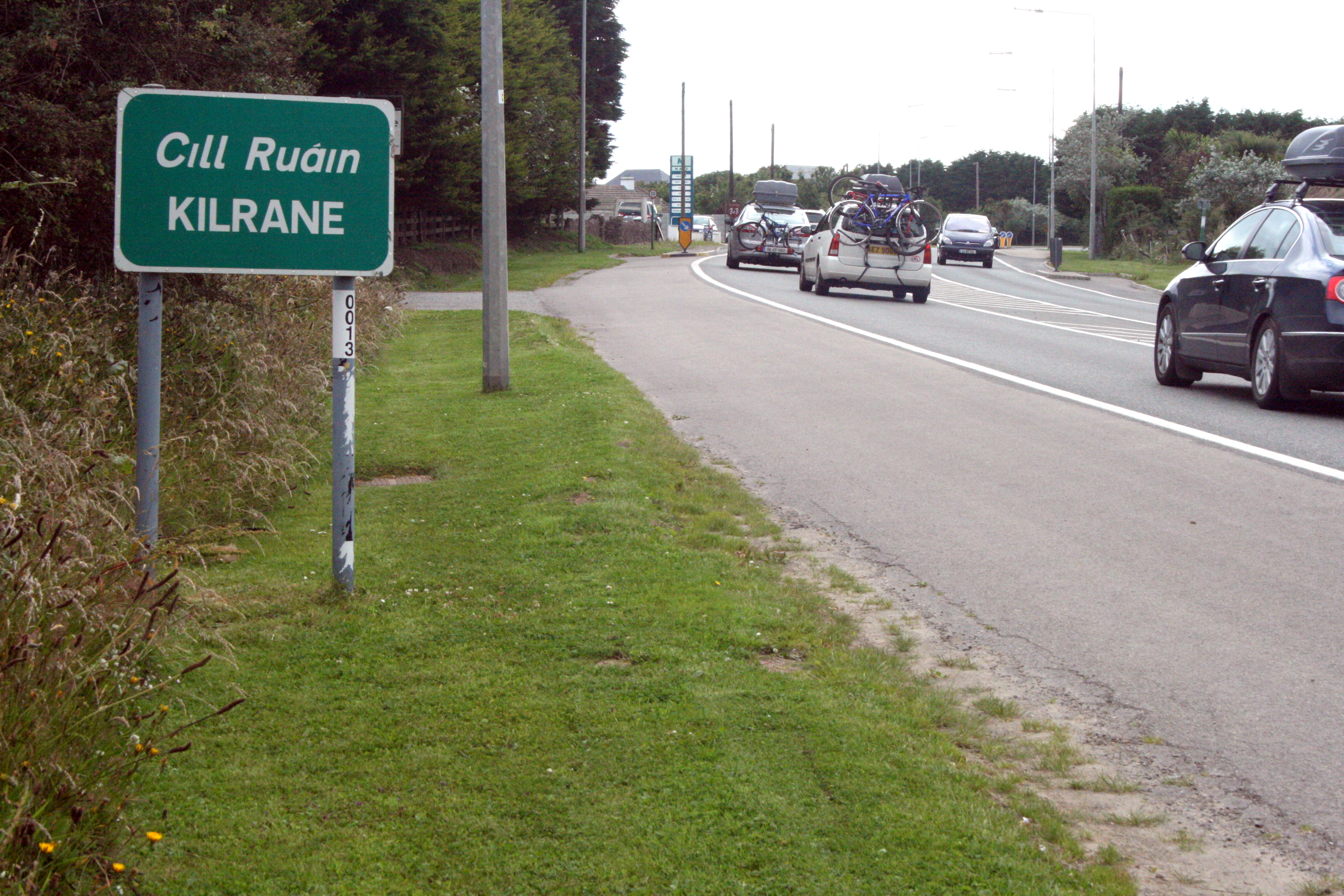
- Signage and road traffic on the N25 at Kilrane

- Location in Ireland
- Coordinates: 52°14′31″N 6°21′22″W
- Country: Ireland
- Province: Leinster
- County: County Wexford

Population (2016)
  - Total: 647
- Time zone: UTC+0 (WET)
  - Summer (DST): UTC-1 (IST (WEST))

Kilrane (Irish: Cill Ruáin) is a village in County Wexford, Ireland. As of the 2016 census, the village had a population of 647 people, up from 432 as of the 2006 census. The village is in a civil parish of the same name.

== Location & access ==
=== Road ===
The village is located on the N25 approximately 18 kilometres from Wexford and effectively merges with the adjacent settlement of Rosslare Harbour, the village centres being 1.5 kilometres apart. Significant volumes of traffic pass through the village in conjunction with ferry arrivals and departures. A 50 km/h speed limit applies from the Wexford approach to the village to Delap's Hill in Rosslare Harbour from where a 30 km/h limit applies in the port area. Plans for the road network in the area include the Rosslare Port Access Road.

=== Bus ===
The village is served by six bus routes, including Bus Éireann Expressway route 40 (to Waterford) and the company's local route 370 (rail replacement via Wellingtonbridge to Waterford) in addition to Local Link route 387 (serving Rosslare Strand and Wexford).

=== Rail ===
==== Present ====
Rosslare Europort railway station is approximately four minutes away by car or around twenty-five minutes on foot.

==== Past ====
Kilrane railway station, located on Station Road, closed to passengers in October 1970. The station house and offices were demolished the following year. Kilrane ceased being a loading point for sugar beet in March 1977. 651 wagons of beet were loaded at Kilrane in the 1976–1977 season. Beet was conveyed by rail to the Irish Sugar Company factory in Thurles.

== Amenities ==
Facilities in the village include two pubs, a takeaway, a craft shop and gallery, a barber, several B & Bs and a post box. A church and national school are also located in the village, and the Rosslare Harbour Maritime Heritage Centre is located at the edge of the village. There is a tradition of cricket in the area and Kilrane Cricket Club was active from 1974 to 1993.

== History ==
St. Ruane's Church was built in the 1830s.

Yola was once spoken in the area. A plaque commemorating the Wexford Rebellion is located adjacent to the N25/Saint Helen's Road junction and features text in the language.

John Redmond, the Irish nationalist politician was born at Ballytrent House, in Kilrane.

The village post office, adjacent to the crossroads in the centre of the village, closed on 22 November 1968. The nearest P.O. is now located in Rosslare Harbour.

The town of Murphy in Argentina is named after John James Murphy, from Haysland, near Kilrane.

== See also ==
- List of towns and villages in the Republic of Ireland
