= Gio Reyna =

American soccer player (born 2002)

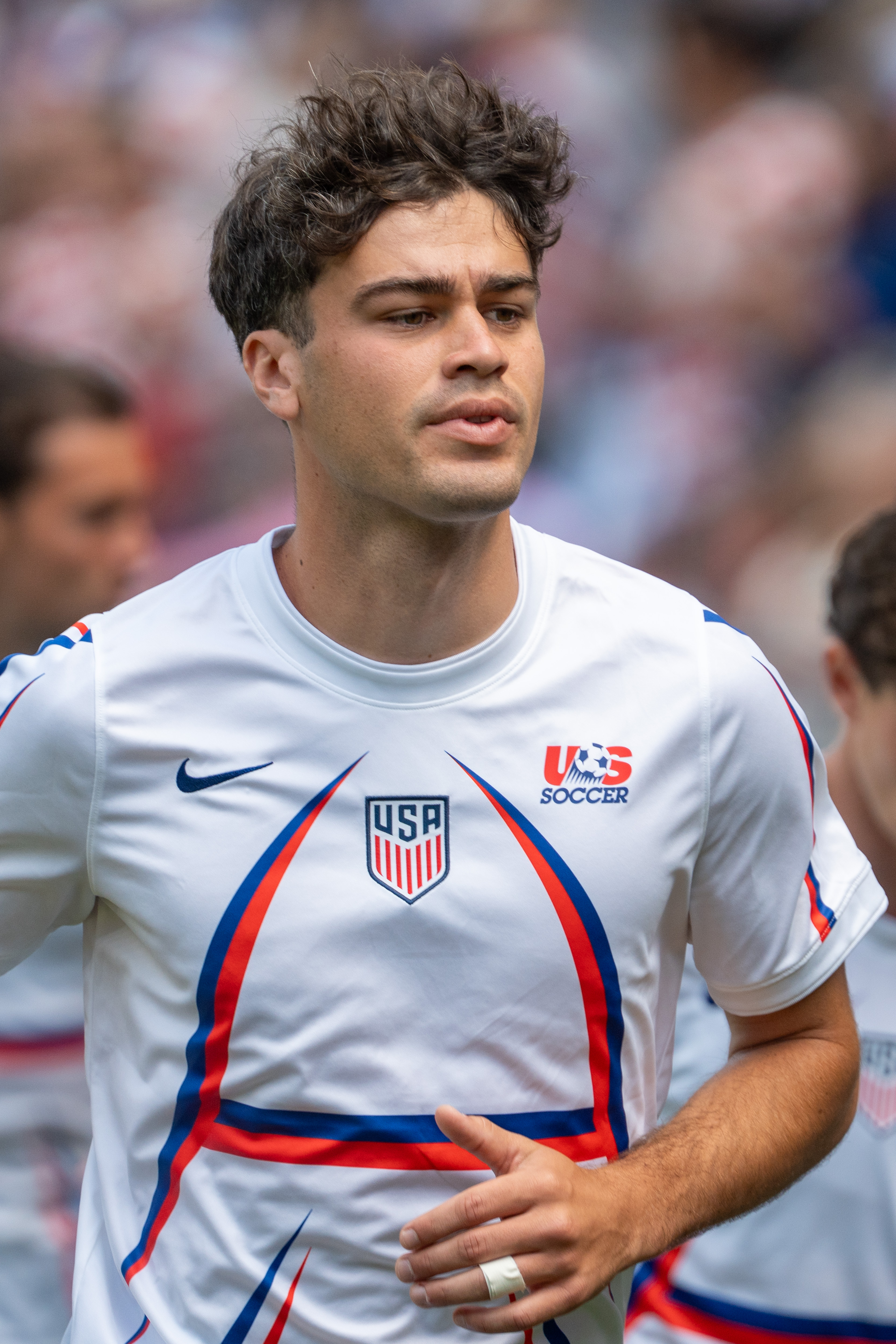
- Reyna with the United States in 2026

Personal information
- Full name: Giovanni Alejandro Reyna
- Date of birth: November 13, 2002 (age 24)
- Place of birth: Sunderland, England
- Height: 6 ft 1 in (1.85 m)
- Position: Attacking midfielder

Team information
- Current team: Strasbourg
- Number: 10

Youth career
- 2015–2019: New York City FC
- 2019–2020: Borussia Dortmund

Senior career*
Years	Team	Apps	(Gls)
2020–2025	Borussia Dortmund	105	(15)
2024	→ Nottingham Forest (loan)	9	(0)
2025–2026	Borussia Mönchengladbach	19	(1)
2026–	Strasbourg	10	(3)

International career^{‡}
2016–2017	United States U15	11	(7)
2017–2018	United States U16	5	(0)
2018–2019	United States U17	18	(8)
2020–	United States	47	(10)
Medal record
Men's soccer
Representing United States
CONCACAF Nations League
Winner	2021 United States
Winner	2023 United States
Winner	2024 United States
CONCACAF Under-17 Championship
Runner-up	2017 Panama
- * Club domestic league appearances and goals as of November 6, 2026 ‡ National team caps and goals as of October 6, 2026

Giovanni Alejandro Reyna (born November 13, 2002) is an American professional soccer player who plays as an attacking midfielder for Ligue 1 club Strasbourg and the United States national team.

Reyna began his youth career with his hometown club, New York City FC, and had his breakthrough with Bundesliga club Borussia Dortmund. During the 2019–20 DFB-Pokal he became the youngest scorer in the German Cup's history at the age of 17, and was a part of the team that won the following 2020–21 DFB-Pokal. In 2020 he became the youngest Bundesliga player to create a hat trick of assists. He was on the final shortlist of the 2021 Kopa Trophy. He moved to Borussia Mönchengladbach in August 2025.

Born to U.S. national team players Claudio Reyna and Danielle Reyna, he has represented the United States at several youth levels, scoring 16 goals in 31 youth caps. Reyna made his debut for the senior team in November 2020 and won the CONCACAF Nations League in 2021, 2023, and 2024, winning the best player overall of the latter. Individually he won a U.S. Soccer Young Male Player of the Year award in 2020.

== Early life ==
Reyna was born in Sunderland, England, to American parents, Claudio Reyna and Danielle Reyna, when his father was playing for Sunderland. Both of his parents are former soccer players, who played for the United States men's and women's national teams, respectively. His family moved back to the United States, settling in Bedford, New York, in 2007 when Reyna was five years old. He joined the academy team of his hometown club, New York City FC, in 2015 and kept playing with the City academy teams until 2019, when he moved to Germany to join Borussia Dortmund's academy.

== Club career ==
=== Borussia Dortmund ===
==== 2019–20 season: Breakthrough ====
On January 18, 2020, Reyna made his Bundesliga debut for Borussia Dortmund, coming on as a substitute in the 72nd minute, in a 5–3 win against FC Augsburg. Hence, he became the youngest American, aged 17 years and 66 days, ever to appear in the Bundesliga, breaking a record previously set by Christian Pulisic.

On February 4, Reyna scored his first professional goal in a 3–2 defeat to Werder Bremen in the DFB-Pokal Round of 16. In doing so, he became the youngest goalscorer in German Cup history. On February 18, 2020, Reyna became the third-youngest player ever to appear in a knockout game of the UEFA Champions League when he came on as a substitute in the 67th minute against Paris Saint-Germain. Nine minutes later, Reyna set up Erling Haaland's game-winning goal for Borussia Dortmund in the first leg of the Round of 16, becoming the youngest American to play and record an assist in a Champions League fixture.

On May 16, Reyna was set to start his first Bundesliga match for Borussia Dortmund in their derby against Schalke 04, but suffered a calf injury during warm-ups. Reyna returned on May 23 and played in the final 11 minutes of a 2–0 victory at VfL Wolfsburg.

==== 2020–21 season: DFB-Pokal win ====
On September 14, 2020, Reyna started in a DFB-Pokal match and scored with a free kick in a 5–0 win against MSV Duisburg. On September 19, 2020, Reyna scored his first Bundesliga goal in a 3–0 win against Borussia Mönchengladbach, aged 17 years and 311 days, to become the second youngest American scorer in Bundesliga history behind Christian Pulisic, who was aged 17 years and 211 days.

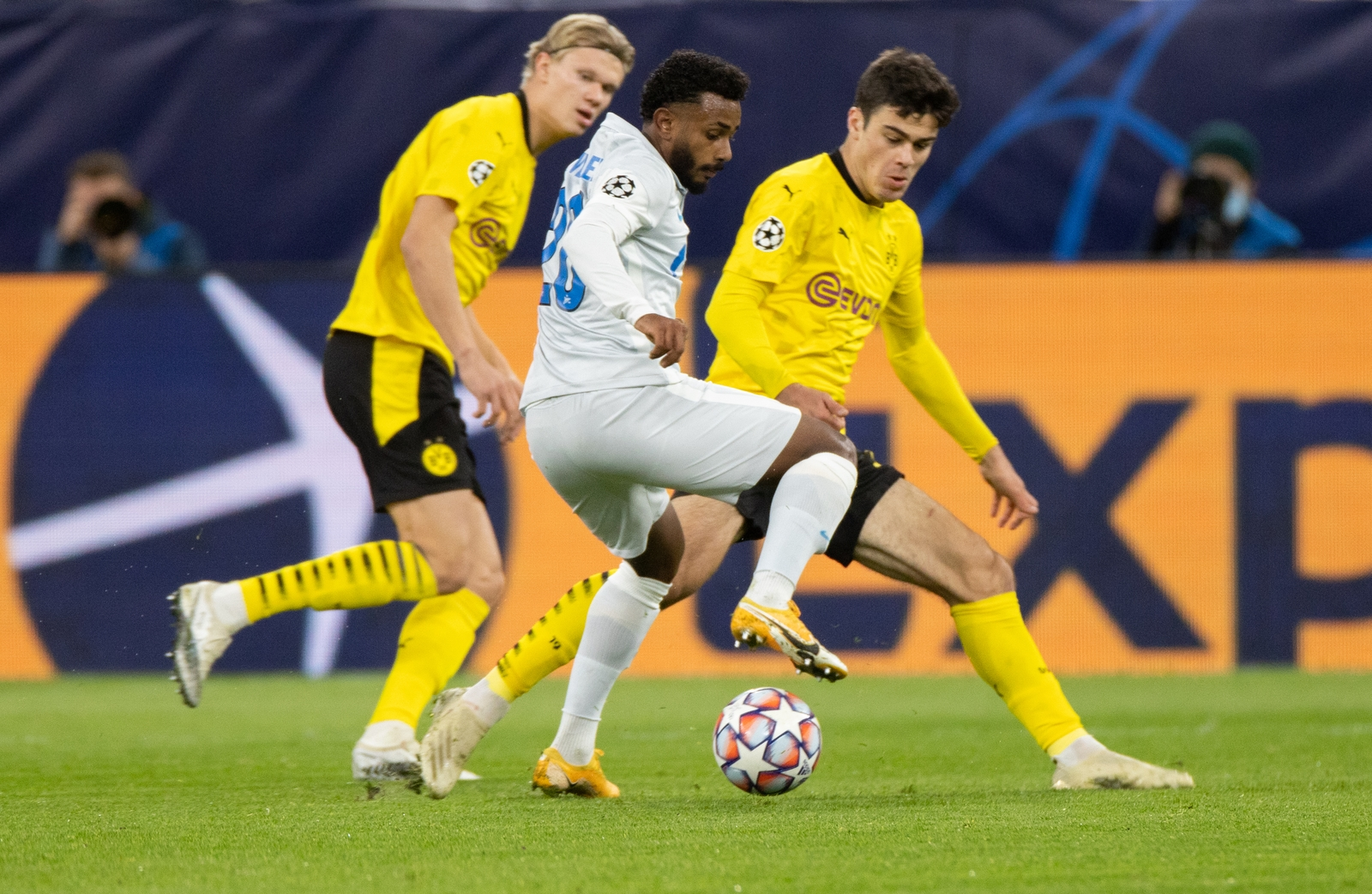
Reyna playing for Dortmund in 2020.

On October 3, 2020, in his third league appearance of the 2020–21 season, Reyna assisted 3 goals—a brace to Erling Haaland and an Emre Can header from a corner kick, to beat SC Freiburg 4–0. As a result, Reyna became the first American to record a hat trick of assists in one of the 5 major European leagues since Steve Cherundolo did it for Hannover in March 2008, and the youngest player to ever do so in the Bundesliga.

On December 5, Reyna scored his second Bundesliga goal against Eintracht Frankfurt, with a near post finish just inside the 18-yard box. This goal made him the second youngest American to score twice in the league after Christian Pulisic did so for the same club as Reyna, Borussia Dortmund. On December 22, he was voted the U.S. Soccer's Young Male Player of the Year for 2020.

Reyna was a second-half substitute for Dortmund in their 4–1 victory over RB Leipzig in the 2021 DFB-Pokal Final on May 13, 2021. His involvement in the match marked him as the youngest American to appear in a domestic cup final in Europe, a record previously held by his international teammate Christian Pulisic. For his strong youth performances, he was on the final shortlist for the 2021 Golden Boy; finishing 6th, and 2021 Kopa Trophy; finishing 9th.

==== 2021–2023: Super-sub and injuries ====
On July 28, 2021, Dortmund announced that Reyna would wear the number 7 shirt for the upcoming season, previously worn by Jadon Sancho. On August 27, he became the youngest player to make 50 Bundesliga appearances during the league match against Hoffenheim. Reyna suffered a series of injuries that caused him to miss the majority of the 2021–22 season.

On September 6, 2022, Reyna became the first American player to provide two assists in a Champions League match in a 3–0 win against Copenhagen. Returning from injuries, on October 22, he scored his first Bundesliga goal in 421 days, adding to a 5–0 victory against VfB Stuttgart. Returning from the 2022 FIFA World Cup, on January 22, 2023, he scored a game-winning goal off the bench against FC Augsburg in the 78th minute, winning 4–3. Three days later, he scored another game-winning goal off the bench in stoppage time in the 93rd minute against Mainz 05, winning 2–1.

Coming into his final season match against Mainz, Reyna had the second best minute-per-goal ratio of a top five European league player for the 2022–23 season after Erling Haaland. On May 27, during the final game of the 2022–23 Bundesliga where Dortmund was in first place, Reyna came off the bench in the 63rd minute when Dortmund were 2–0 down against Mainz 05 and created two assists to level the game 2–2. The game ended in a draw and Dortmund was the league runner-up to Bayern. Reyna finished the season with four assists and his highest Bundesliga goal amount with seven goals, five of which were as a substitute.

==== 2024–2025: Loan and playtime decline ====
On January 31, 2024, Reyna extended his contract with Borussia Dortmund until June 30, 2026, and was subsequently loaned to Premier League club Nottingham Forest until the end of the 2023–24 season.

He made his debut for Forest as a 78th-minute substitute for Anthony Elanga in a 1–1 draw against Bournemouth in the Premier League on February 4. On April 13, Reyna recorded an assist against Wolverhampton Wanderers in his first start of the season. He ultimately only featured in 10 matches for Forest and returned to Dortmund, finishing the 2023–24 season with no goals for both clubs.

Reyna played only sporadically throughout the 2024–25 season, playing only 341 league minutes and scoring two goals with one assist.

=== Borussia Mönchengladbach ===
On August 23, 2025, Reyna made a permanent move to Borussia Mönchengladbach until 2028 for around €7 million. He scored his first goal for the club in the stoppage time of a 3–1 away defeat against FC Augsburg on May 9, 2026. However, his debut season at the club was hampered by recurring injuries and inconsistent minutes, as he managed only four league starts and one goal across all competitions.

=== Strasbourg ===
On 4 August 2026, Reyna joined Ligue 1 club Strasbourg, signing a contract until 2031.

== International career ==
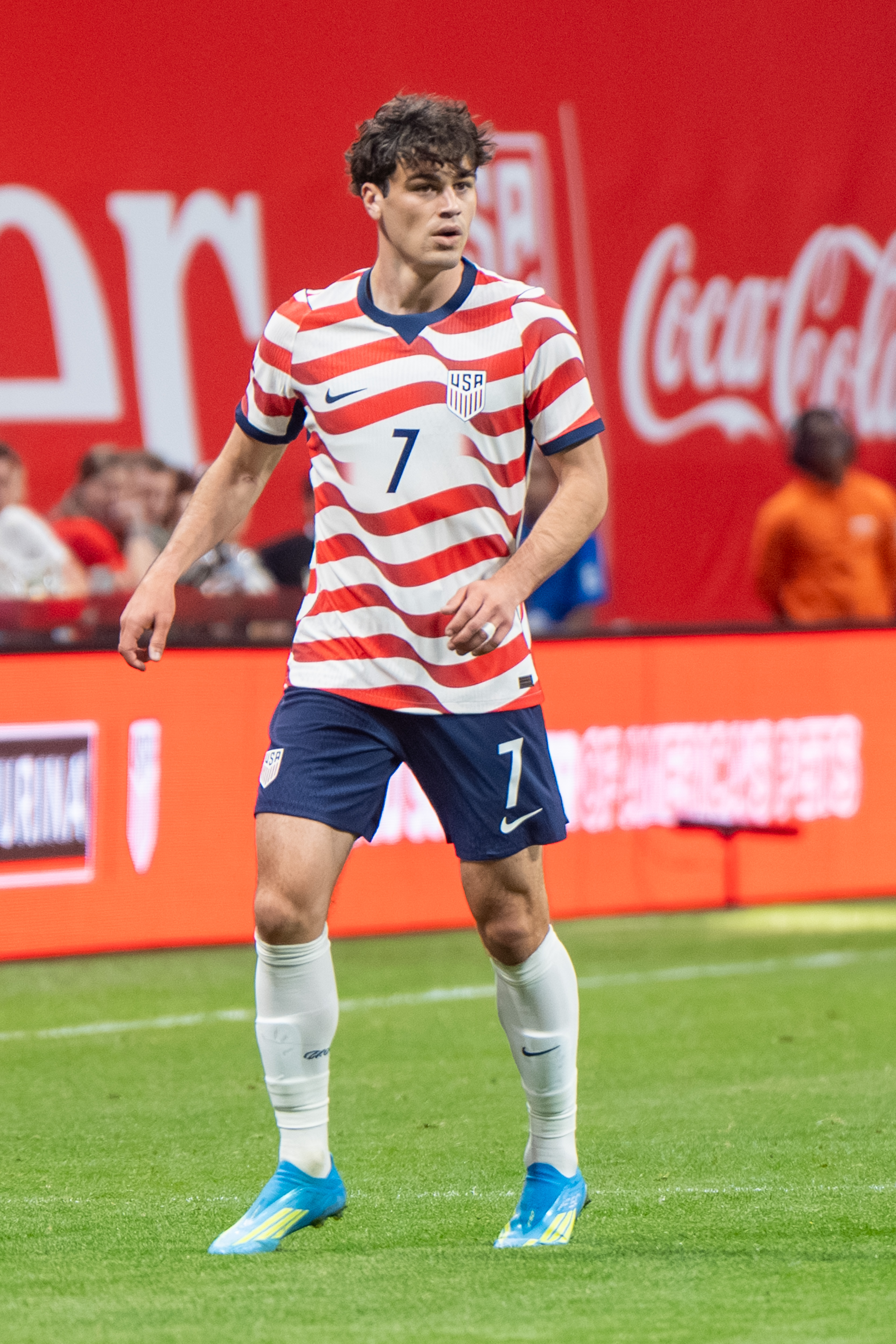
Reyna in 2026

After representing the United States at several youth levels, Reyna received his first call up to the senior United States squad for matches against Wales and Panama in November 2020. On November 12, 2020, a day before his 18th birthday, Reyna made his senior national team debut against Wales. In the following game, a 6–2 friendly victory over Panama, Reyna started and scored his first senior goal directly from a free kick.

In 2021, Reyna won the inaugural CONCACAF Nations League and scored in the 3–2 victory against rivals Mexico in the final.

On March 24, 2022, during a third-round 2022 World Cup qualification match against Mexico at Estadio Azteca, Reyna dribbled past six Mexican defenders in a single run before being dispossessed; after the match it was compared to Diego Maradona's "Goal of the Century" run during the quarter-finals of the 1986 World Cup, which was also at the Azteca.

In the 2022 FIFA World Cup, Reyna played only 52 minutes in four games. His sidelining throughout the group stage of the tournament led to speculation from analysts of possible issues within the team. USMNT head coach Gregg Berhalter publicly addressed issues regarding an anonymous player for a lack of commitment and poor attitude, and confirmed that the team had held a meeting to determine if that player were to remain with the team in Qatar for the remainder of the tournament. On December 12, 2022, Reyna confirmed that he was the aforementioned player about whom Berhalter was speaking, and apologized for his behavior while criticizing the decision to publicize the information. In January 2023, it was revealed that Berhalter had been confronted during the tournament about damaging personal information that was floated to superiors. Danielle Reyna, Reyna's mother, confirmed that she was the one who informed the U.S. Soccer Federation about the episode of violent behavior between Berhalter and his wife from 1991. Ultimately this led to an investigation of Berhalter that found the incident to be isolated and no reason to not employ him as a coach.

During the 2023 CONCACAF Nations League, Reyna recorded two assists in the United States' 2–0 victory over Canada in the final, where he was named man of the match. On October 17, 2023, he recorded his first international brace in a 4–0 friendly win over Ghana. During the 2024 CONCACAF Nations League Finals, Reyna assisted two goals in the United States' 3–1 semi-final victory over Jamaica. In the following game, he scored in the 2–0 final victory against Mexico, again being named man of the match as well as the best player of the tournament.

Reyna with the United States at the 2026 FIFA World Cup

On May 26, 2026, Reyna was named in the 26-man squad for the 2026 FIFA World Cup hosted on home soil. On June 12, 2026, Reyna scored a trivela in the last touch of the 4-1 win over Paraguay in their opening match of the World Cup.

== Personal life ==
Giovanni is the son of former professional soccer player and United States men's national team player Claudio Reyna, and Danielle Reyna, a former member of the United States women's national soccer team. Reyna is of Argentine-Portuguese descent through his father's parents and of Irish-American descent through his mother. His older brother, Jack, died of brain cancer in 2012, at the age of 13. His younger sister, Carolina, attends St. Stephen's Episcopal School and plays club soccer in Texas. She was also selected to represent the USA on the United States women's national under-17 soccer team for the 2026 FIFA U-17 Women's World Cup, making her and Reyna the first brother-sister duo to represent the United States at a U-17 World Cup.

Reyna started his international career by playing with the United States' youth teams, but after impressing with Borussia Dortmund, he attracted interest from the Portuguese, English and Argentine national teams. Ultimately, in a March 2020 interview with Sports Illustrated, Reyna declared his intent to play for the United States: "I'm aware of the rumors, but it's quite clear for me. I only want to play for the United States. That's my home country."

He was named after his father's former Rangers teammate Giovanni van Bronckhorst. His high level of play has earned him the nickname "The American Dream" from his former teammate Erling Haaland. Reyna is close friends with United States teammate Joe Scally; both players began attending the New York City FC youth academy in 2015. Reyna is also close friends with his former Dortmund teammate, Jude Bellingham.

Reyna married his wife Chloe Reyna (née Ortolano) in July 2025. In June 2026, he announced that Chloe was pregnant with their first child.

== Career statistics ==
=== Club ===
As of match played November 6, 2026

Appearances and goals by club, season and competition
Club	Season	League			National cup (Note: Includes DFB-Pokal, FA Cup)		Continental		Other		Total	
Club	Season	Division	Apps	Goals	Apps	Goals	Apps	Goals	Apps	Goals	Apps	Goals
Borussia Dortmund	2019–20	Bundesliga	15	0	1	1	2 (Note: Appearances in UEFA Champions League)	0	—		18	1
Borussia Dortmund	2020–21	Bundesliga	32	4	5	3	8	0	1 (Note: Appearance in DFL-Supercup)	0	46	7
Borussia Dortmund	2021–22	Bundesliga	10	2	1	0	1 (Note: Appearance in UEFA Europa League)	0	1	0	13	2
Borussia Dortmund	2022–23	Bundesliga	22	7	2	0	6	0	—		30	7
Borussia Dortmund	2023–24	Bundesliga	11	0	1	0	2	0	—		14	0
Borussia Dortmund	2024–25	Bundesliga	15	2	—		9	0	1 (Note: Appearance in FIFA Club World Cup)	0	25	2
Borussia Dortmund	Total		105	15	10	4	28	0	3	0	146	19
Nottingham Forest (loan)	2023–24	Premier League	9	0	1	0	—		—		10	0
Borussia Mönchengladbach	2025–26	Bundesliga	19	1	0	0	—		—		19	1
Strasbourg	2026–27	Ligue 1	10	3	0	0	—		—		10	3
Career total			143	19	11	4	28	0	3	0	185	23

=== International ===
As of match played October 6, 2026

Appearances and goals by national team and year
National team	Year	Apps	Goals
United States	2020	2	1
United States	2021	7	3
United States	2022	7	0
United States	2023	8	3
United States	2024	7	1
United States	2025	3	1
United States	2026	13	1
Total		47	10

Scores and results list United States' goal tally first, score column indicates score after each Reyna goal.

List of international goals scored by Giovanni Reyna
No.	Date	Venue	Cap	Opponent	Score	Result	Competition
1	November 16, 2020	Stadion Wiener Neustadt, Wiener Neustadt, Austria	2	Panama	1–1	6–2	Friendly
2	March 28, 2021	Windsor Park, Belfast, Northern Ireland	4	Northern Ireland	1–0	2–1	Friendly
3	June 6, 2021	Empower Field at Mile High, Denver, United States	7	Mexico	1–1	3–2 (a.e.t.)	2019–20 CONCACAF Nations League
4	June 9, 2021	Rio Tinto Stadium, Sandy, United States	8	Costa Rica	4–0	4–0	Friendly
5	October 17, 2023	Geodis Park, Nashville, United States	22	Ghana	1–0	4–0	Friendly
6	October 17, 2023	Geodis Park, Nashville, United States	22	Ghana	4–0	4–0	Friendly
7	November 16, 2023	Q2 Stadium, Austin, United States	23	Trinidad and Tobago	3–0	3–0	2023–24 CONCACAF Nations League A
8	March 24, 2024	AT&T Stadium, Arlington, United States	26	Mexico	2–0	2–0	2023–24 CONCACAF Nations League
9	November 15, 2025	Subaru Park, Chester, United States	33	Paraguay	1–0	2–1	Friendly
10	June 12, 2026	SoFi Stadium, Inglewood, United States	39	Paraguay	4–1	4–1	2026 FIFA World Cup

== Honors ==
Borussia Dortmund

- DFB-Pokal: 2020–21
- UEFA Champions League runner-up: 2023–24

United States

- CONCACAF Nations League: 2019–20, 2022–23, 2023–24

Individual

- CONCACAF U-17 Championship Best XI: 2019
- U.S. Soccer's Young Male Player of the Year: 2020
- IFFHS Men's CONCACAF Team: 2020
- CONCACAF Nations League Finals Best XI: 2021, 2023, 2024
- CONCACAF Nations League Player of the Tournament: 2023–24
