= Matt Crocker =

Welsh soccer administrator

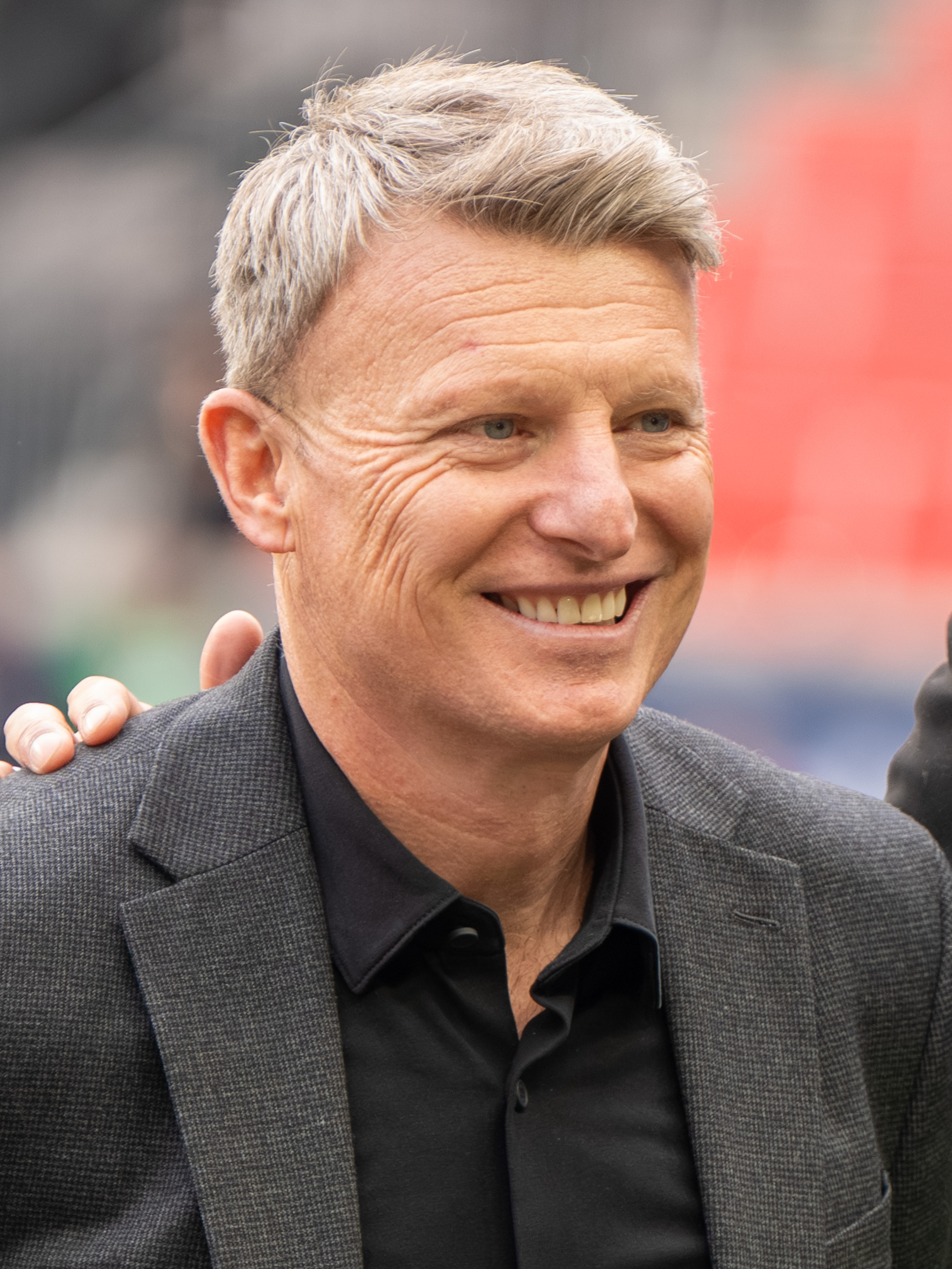
- Crocker in 2026

Personal information
- Place of birth: Wales

Team information
- Current team: Saudi Arabia (technical director)

Managerial career
- Years: Team
- 2006–2013: Southampton (technical director)
- 2013–2020: England (technical director)
- 2020–2023: Southampton (technical director)
- 2023–2026: United States (technical director)
- 2026–: Saudi Arabia (technical director)

Matt Crocker is a Welsh soccer administrator who has served as the technical director for the Saudi Arabian Football Federation since 2026.

He was previously the technical director for the United States Soccer Federation from 2023 to 2026.

== Career ==
Prior to joining U.S. Soccer, Crocker was the director of football operations at English Premier League club Southampton F.C., where he was regarded as being instrumental in keeping the Saints in the top flight of English football. He also led the club's academy from 2006 to 2013, with players such as Gareth Bale and James Ward-Prowse present during his tenure. Following his first stint with the Saints, he joined The Football Association, where he was its head of development teams before returning to Southampton in February 2020.

A graduate of Cardiff Metropolitan University, Crocker began his career in 1999, where he was the academy manager at Cardiff City F.C. He then joined the English Football League as its youth development monitor before his initial stint with Southampton.

On 25 April 2023, Crocker, aged 48, was appointed technical sporting director of the US Soccer Federation. He began working for U.S. Soccer full-time starting 2 August 2023. Crocker replaced Earnie Stewart, who served in the role from 2019 until taking the same position at PSV Eindhoven in January 2023. He was instrumental in hiring Mauricio Pochettino as the men's national team coach in 2024.

On 14 April 2026, Crocker left his position to join the Saudi Arabian Football Federation.
