= Maurizio Pochettino =

Argentine-Spanish association football player

Personal information
- Full name: Maurizio Pochettino Grippaldi
- Date of birth: 30 March 2001 (age 25)
- Place of birth: Barcelona, Spain
- Height: 1.80 m (5 ft 11 in)
- Position: Winger

Team information
- Current team: Inter Club d'Escaldes
- Number: 24

Youth career
- 2013–2015: Southampton
- 2015–2021: Tottenham Hotspur

Senior career*
Years	Team	Apps	(Gls)
2021–2022	Watford	1	(0)
2022–2024	Gimnàstic	20	(0)
2024–2025	Ibiza Islas Pitiusas	32	(1)
2025–	Inter Club d'Escaldes	19	(2)
- * Club domestic league appearances and goals as of 14:56, 10 May 2026

Maurizio Pochettino Grippaldi (Italian: [poketˈtiːno ɡripˈpaldi]; born 30 March 2001) is a Spanish professional footballer who plays as a winger for Andorran club Inter Club d'Escaldes.

== Early life ==
Pochettino is the son of the Argentine football manager and former footballer, Mauricio Pochettino. He was born in Barcelona when his father was playing for Espanyol, and spent part of his childhood in France and England.

== Career ==
Pochettino joined the academy of Southampton when his father was appointed their manager, and moved to Tottenham Hotspur in 2015. He scored his first goal for the under-18 side against Norwich City in October 2018. Pochettino signed his first professional contract with Tottenham Hotspur in July 2019, and in early December, he made his debut for the under-23s against VfL Wolfsburg. He signed a new contract with the club on 29 June 2020.

On 31 January 2021, Pochettino joined Watford on a free transfer. He made his professional debut in a 2–0 EFL Championship defeat to Brentford on 1 May, as an 85th-minute substitute for Dan Gosling. Pochettino was released by Watford at the end of the 2021–22 season.

In July 2022, it was announced that Pochettino had signed for Primera Federación club Gimnàstic on a one-year deal. On 28 June 2023, he renewed his contract for a further year.

In August 2025, Pochettino signed for Andorran club Inter Club d'Escaldes.

== Personal life ==
Born in Spain, Pochettino's parents are both Italian-Argentines.

== Career statistics ==
As of 2025

Appearances and goals by club, season and competition
Club	Season	League			Cup		League cup		Europe		Other		Total	
Club	Season	Division	Apps	Goals	Apps	Goals	Apps	Goals	Apps	Goals	Apps	Goals	Apps	Goals
Tottenham Hotspur U23	2019–20	—	—		—		—		—		1 (Note: Appearance in EFL Trophy)	0	1	0
Watford	2020–21	Championship	1	0	0	0	0	0	—		—		1	0
Gimnàstic	2022–23	Primera Federación	14	0	3	0	—		—		—		17	0
Gimnàstic	2023–24	Primera Federación	6	0	1	0	—		—		—		7	0
Ibiza Islas Pitiusas	2024–25	Segunda Federación	32	1	1	0	—		—		—		33	1
Ibiza Islas Pitiusas	Total		16	0	0	0	0	0	0	0	0	0	19	0
Career total			17	0	3	0	0	0	0	0	1	0	21	0
