= 2010–11 Gimnàstic de Tarragona season =

Gimnàstic de Tarragona
2010–11 season
- President: José María Fernández
- Manager: Luis César Sampedro (until 4 December); Joan Carles Oliva (from 4 December)
- Liga Adelante: 18th
- Copa del Rey: Second Qualifying Round
- Top goalscorer: League: Powel (10); All: Powel (10)
Home colours	Away colours	Third colours

Is the 2010–11 Gimnàstic de Tarragona season. The club plays in two tournaments: the Segunda División and the Copa del Rey.

== Squad ==
Note: Flags indicate national team as defined under FIFA eligibility rules; some limited exceptions apply. Players may hold more than one non-FIFA nationality.

No.	Pos.	Nation	Player
1	GK	ESP	Rubén Pérez (vice-captain)
2	MF	ESP	Álex Bergantiños (on loan from Deportivo)
3	DF	ESP	Mingo (captain)
4	DF	ESP	Álex Ortiz
5	DF	ESP	Sergio Díaz
6	MF	ESP	David Medina (vice-captain)
7	FW	ESP	Albert Virgili
8	MF	ESP	Fernando Morán
9	FW	ESP	Rubén Navarro
10	MF	ESP	Walter
11	FW	ESP	Felipe Sanchón (on loan from Udinese)
12	FW	NED	Berry Powel
13	GK	ESP	José Moragón
14	MF	ESP	Vicente

No.	Pos.	Nation	Player
15	DF	ESP	Pedro Mairata
16	MF	ESP	Fernando Seoane
17	DF	ESP	Raúl Fuster
18	MF	ESP	Tuni (on loan from Mallorca)
19	MF	FRA	Ludovic Delporte
20	MF	ESP	Miki
21	DF	ESP	Xisco Campos
22	DF	ESP	Manuel Ruz
23	MF	ESP	Rodri
24	MF	ESP	Gerardo
25	FW	ESP	Borja Viguera (on loan from Real Sociedad)
30	DF	FRA	Marc Fachan
32	FW	ESP	Eloy Gila
37	MF	ESP	Álvaro Rey

=== Youth squad ===
Youth players with first team experience
Note: Flags indicate national team as defined under FIFA eligibility rules; some limited exceptions apply. Players may hold more than one non-FIFA nationality.

No.	Pos.	Nation	Player
31	MF	ESP	Jordi Roca
40	GK	ESP	Antonio David
45	DF	ESP	Aleix Coch
46	DF	ESP	Aitor Casas
50	DF	ESP	Vélez

== Player statistics ==
=== Squad stats ===
Last updated on 8 June 2011.

No.	Pos	Nat	Player	Total		Liga Adelante		Copa del Rey	
No.	Pos	Nat	Player	Apps	Goals	Apps	Goals	Apps	Goals
1	GK	(Spain) ESP	Rubén Pérez	41	0	41	0	0	0
13	GK	(Spain) ESP	José Moragón	2	0	1	0	1	0
40	GK	(Spain) ESP	Antonio David	0	0	0	0	0	0
3	DF	(Spain) ESP	Mingo	24	0	24	0	0	0
4	DF	(Spain) ESP	Álex Ortiz	16	0	15	0	1	0
5	DF	(Spain) ESP	Sergio Díaz	21	0	21	0	0	0
6	DF	(Spain) ESP	David Medina	27	0	26	0	1	0
15	DF	(Spain) ESP	Pedro Mairata	33	2	33	2	0	0
17	DF	(Spain) ESP	Raúl Fuster	20	0	19	0	1	0
21	DF	(Spain) ESP	Xisco Campos	35	0	34	0	1	0
22	DF	(Spain) ESP	Manuel Ruz	5	0	5	0	0	0
30	DF	(France) FRA	Marc Fachan	0	0	0	0	0	0
2	MF	(Spain) ESP	Álex Bergantiños	21	0	21	0	0	0
8	MF	(Spain) ESP	Fernando Morán	33	4	33	4	0	0
10	MF	(Spain) ESP	Walter Fernández	10	0	10	0	0	0
14	MF	(Spain) ESP	Vicente	2	0	2	0	0	0
16	MF	(Spain) ESP	Fernando Seoane	38	0	38	0	0	0
18	MF	(Spain) ESP	Tuni	11	0	11	0	0	0
19	MF	(France) FRA	Ludovic Delporte	11	0	10	0	1	0
20	MF	(Spain) ESP	Miki	17	1	16	1	1	0
23	MF	(Spain) ESP	Rodri	20	2	19	2	1	0
24	MF	(Spain) ESP	Gerardo	25	1	24	0	1	1
31	MF	(Spain) ESP	Jordi Roca	0	0	0	0	0	0
37	MF	(Spain) ESP	Álvaro Rey	29	0	29	0	0	0
7	FW	(Spain) ESP	Albert Virgili	5	1	5	1	0	0
9	FW	(Spain) ESP	Rubén Navarro	18	2	18	2	0	0
11	FW	(Spain) ESP	Felipe Sanchón	18	4	18	4	0	0
12	FW	(Spain) ESP	Berry Powel	41	11	40	11	1	0
25	FW	(Spain) ESP	Borja Viguera	5	2	5	2	0	0
32	FW	(Spain) ESP	Eloy Gila	36	5	35	5	1	0
–	DF	(Spain) ESP	Curro Torres	0	0	0	0	0	0
-	MF	(Spain) ESP	Álex Cruz	21	0	20	0	1	0
–	MF	(Spain) ESP	Abraham	5	0	4	0	1	0
–	FW	(Spain) ESP	Juan Domínguez	11	0	11	0	0	0

== Pre-season ==
30 July 2010 Friendly	Rialp (Spain)	0–8	(Spain) Gimnàstic	Rialp, Spain
--:-- CEST

1 August 2010 Friendly	Balaguer (Spain)	0–2	(Spain) Gimnàstic	Rialp, Spain
--:-- CEST

5 August 2010 Friendly	Rapitenca (Spain)	3–0	(Spain) Gimnàstic	Sant Carles de la Ràpita, Spain
--:-- CEST

7 August 2010 Friendly	Santboià (Spain)	0–3	(Spain) Gimnàstic	Sant Boi de Llobregat, Spain
--:-- CEST

11 August 2010 Friendly	Reus (Spain)	2–0	(Spain) Gimnàstic	Reus, Spain
--:-- CEST

12 August 2010 Friendly	Palamós (Spain)	1–2	(Spain) Gimnàstic	Palamós, Spain
--:-- CEST

15 August 2010 Friendly	Barcelona B (Spain)	1–1	(Spain) Gimnàstic	Barcelona, Spain
--:-- CEST	Nolito 69' (pen.)		Gila 78'	Stadium: Mini Estadi; Attendance: 250; Referee: Gracia Álvarez

== Ciutat de Tarragona Trophy ==
21 August 2010 Final	Gimnàstic (Spain)	1–1	(Spain) Espanyol	Tarragona, Spain
--:-- CEST	Navarro 38'		Osvaldo 92' (pen.)	Stadium: Nou Estadi de Tarragona; Attendance: 6,000; Referee: Rebollo López

== Season results ==
=== Segunda División ===
==== With Luis César Sampedro ====
28 August 2010 1	Las Palmas	3–2	Gimnàstic	Las Palmas
17:00 CEST; 16:00 Local time	Cejudo 25'; Aythami 30'; Samuel (yellow card) 39'; Vitolo (yellow card) 52'; Viera (yellow card) 73'; Pollo (yellow card) 76'; Guerrero 85'	(Report)	Navarro 13'; Morán 26'; Domínguez (yellow card) 41'; Campos (yellow card) 59'; Mingo (yellow card) 71'; Díaz (yellow card) 78'	Stadium: Estadio Gran Canaria; Attendance: 9,532; Referee: Carlos del Cerro Grande

4 September 2010 2	Gimnàstic	2–0	Girona	Tarragona
18:00 CEST	Ortiz (yellow card) 43'; Cruz (yellow card) 57'; Powel 78', 80'	(Report)	José (yellow card) 27' (yellow-red card) 60'; Peragón (yellow card) 50'; Mallo (yellow card) 65'; Moha (red card) 65'; Chechu (yellow card) 81'	Stadium: Nou Estadi; Attendance: 2,500; Referee: Santiago Jaime Latre

10 September 2010 3	Salamanca	1–0	Gimnàstic	Villares de la Reina
21:00 CEST	Juanjo 41', (yellow card) 81'; Arbilla (yellow card) 64'	(Report)	Domínguez (yellow card) 25'; Seoane (yellow card) 67'; Navarro (yellow card) 72'; Ortiz (yellow card) 76'; Mingo (red card) 0'	Stadium: Estadio El Helmántico; Attendance: 5,640; Referee: Mario Melero López

19 September 2010 4	Gimnàstic	0–1	Rayo Vallecano	Tarragona
17:00 CEST	Campos (yellow card) 30'; Ruz (yellow card) 54'; Medina (yellow card) 83'; Miki (yellow card) 88'	(Report)	Trejo 30'; Fuego (yellow card) 41'; Amaya (yellow card) 73' (yellow-red card) 51'; Movilla (yellow card) 57'; Armenteros (yellow card) 68'; Tito (yellow card) 87'; Cobeño (yellow card) 90'	Stadium: Nou Estadi; Attendance: 5,302; Referee: Eduardo Prieto Iglesias

26 September 2010 5	Celta Vigo	1–0	Gimnàstic	Vigo (Pontevedra)
17:00 CEST	De Lucas 7'; Català (yellow card) 43'	(Report)	Ortiz (yellow card) 40'	Stadium: Balaídos; Referee: José Luis Lesma López

2 October 2010 6	Gimnàstic	0–2	Xerez	Tarragona
18:00 CEST	Mingo (yellow card) 40'	(Report)	José Mari 8'; Cordero (yellow card) 15' (goal) 64'; Bermejo (yellow card) 25'; Moreno (red card) 25'	Stadium: Nou Estadi; Attendance: 4,123; Referee: Jorge Valdés Aller

9 October 2010 7	Cartagena	2–2	Gimnàstic	Cartagena (Murcia)
18:00 CEST	Botelho 7'; Muñoz 90'	(Report)	Rodri 57', (yellow card) 59'; Cruz (yellow card) 72'; Powel 75'; Díaz (yellow card) 87'	Stadium: Estadio Cartagonova; Attendance: 7,000; Referee: Juan Martínez Munuera

16 October 2010 8	Gimnàstic	1–1	Barcelona B	Tarragona
18:00 CEST	Campos (yellow card) 5'; Ortiz (yellow card) 28'; Gila 40'; Díaz (yellow card) 65'	(Report)	Nolito 15', (yellow card) 73'; Fontàs (yellow card) 20'; Rochina (yellow card) 74'; Bartra (yellow card) 80'	Stadium: Nou Estadi; Attendance: 5,705; Referee: Pedro Jesús Pérez Montero

24 October 2010 9	Numancia	1–0	Gimnàstic	Soria
17:00 CEST	Baldé 81'	(Report)	Seoane (yellow card) 60'; Díaz (yellow card) 76'; Morán (yellow card) 89'	Stadium: Los Pajaritos; Referee: Antonio Israel Mariscal Sánchez

31 October 2010 10	Gimnàstic	1–1	Córdoba	Tarragona
17:00 CET	Mingo (yellow card) 62'; Agus 73' (o.g.); Díaz (yellow card) 75'; Cruz (yellow card) 82'	(Report)	Agus (yellow card) 87'; Luque 84' (pen.); De Coz (yellow card) 88'	Stadium: Nou Estadi; Attendance: 4,500; Referee: Daniel Jesús Trujillo Suárez

7 November 2010 11	Tenerife	0–2	Gimnàstic	Santa Cruz de Tenerife
19:00 CET; 18:00 Local time	Luna (yellow card) 34'	(Report)	Medina (yellow card) 15'; Gila 55'; Cruz (yellow card) 66'; Morán 85'	Stadium: Estadio Heliodoro Rodríguez López; Attendance: 16,463; Referee: Julio Amoedo Chas

13 November 2010 12	Gimnàstic	0–0	Elche	Tarragona
18:00 CET	Mingo (yellow card) 13'; Seoane (yellow card) 42'; Morán (yellow card) 50'; Powel (yellow card) 88'	(Report)	Etxeita (yellow card) 11'; Carpio (yellow card) 29'; Sánchez (yellow card) 39'; Verdés (yellow card) 89'; Acciari (yellow card) 90'	Stadium: Nou Estadi; Attendance: 4,204; Referee: Alfonso Pino Zamorano

20 November 2010 13	Gimnàstic	0–0	Huesca	Tarragona
18:00 CET	Campos (yellow card) 65'; Morán (yellow card) 87'	(Report)	Sorribas (yellow card) 71' (yellow-red card) 76'	Stadium: Nou Estadi; Attendance: 4,200; Referee: Carlos del Cerro Grande

28 November 2010 14	Alcorcón	1–1	Gimnàstic	Alcorcón (Madrid)
12:00 CET	Nagore (yellow card) 23'; Quini 39'; Nino (yellow card) 49' (yellow-red card) 52'; Ángel (yellow card) 67'	(Report)	Cruz (yellow card) 47'; Powel 68' (pen.), (yellow card) 36'; Mingo (yellow card) 88'	Stadium: Municipal de Santo Domingo; Attendance: 2,000; Referee: Pedro Jesús Pérez Montero

4 December 2010 15	Gimnàstic	1–2	Villarreal B	Tarragona
18:00 CET	Rodri 52'; Seoane (yellow card) 67'	(Report)	Pérez (yellow card) 14', (goal) 63'; Jaume (yellow card) 46'; Marquitos 58' (pen.) (yellow card) 71'; Bordas (yellow card) 61'	Stadium: Nou Estadi; Attendance: 3,700; Referee: José Luis Lesma López

==== With Joan Carles Oliva ====
12 December 2010 16	Granada	6–1	Gimnàstic	Granada
17:00 CET	Orellana 11'; Siqueira (yellow card) 25'; Collantes 28' (pen.); Geijo 30', 65'; López 64'; Abel 79'; Mensah (yellow card) 88'	(Report)	Mingo (yellow card) 26'; Gila 50'; Rodri (yellow card) 67'	Stadium: Estadio Nuevo Los Cármenes; Attendance: 13,000; Referee: Jorge Valdés Aller

18 December 2010 17	Gimnàstic	0–0	Recreativo Huelva	Tarragona
18:00 CET		(Report)	Manolo (yellow card) 26'; Aarón (yellow card) 76'	Stadium: Nou Estadi

2 January 2011 18	Real Betis	1–0	Gimnàstic	Seville
16:00 CET	Iriney (yellow card) 35'; Emana 38' (pen.); Nacho (yellow card) 87'; Beñat (yellow card) 88'	(Report)	Campos (yellow card) 55'	Stadium: Estadio Benito Villamarín; Attendance: 25,000; Referee: Carlos del Cerro Grande

8 January 2011 19	Gimnàstic	1–0	Real Valladolid	Tarragona
16:00 CET	Díaz (yellow card) 33'; Navarro 70'	(Report)	López (yellow card) 44'; Nauzet (yellow card) 60'; Rueda (yellow card) 73'	Stadium: Nou Estadi; Attendance: 4,000; Referee: José Ramón Piñeiro Crespo

15 January 2011 20	Albacete	0–1	Gimnàstic	Albacete
18:00 CET	Camacho (yellow card) 84'	(Report)	Morán (yellow card) 61'; Viguera 86'; Navarro (yellow card) 89'	Stadium: Estadio Carlos Belmonte; Referee: Pedro Sureda Cuenca

23 January 2011 21	Gimnàstic	0–0	Ponferradina	Tarragona
				Stadium: Nou Estadi; Attendance: 5,000; Referee: Pedro Jesús Pérez Montero

29 January 2011 22	Gimnàstic	0–0	Las Palmas	Tarragona
15:00	Mingo (yellow card) 35'		Vega (yellow card) 37'; Aythami (yellow card) 46'; Suárez (yellow card) 51'; González (yellow card) 84'	Stadium: Nou Estadi; Referee: Francisco Ontanaya López-Astilleros

6 February 2011 23	Girona	2–1	Gimnàstic	Girona
	Peragón 7'; Tortolero (yellow card) 21'; Serra (yellow card) 81'; Jandro 84'	(Report)	Mairata 11', (red card) 71'; Medina (yellow card) 31'	Stadium: Montilivi; Attendance: 8,900; Referee: Hernández Hernández

13 February 2011 24	Gimnàstic	2–0	Salamanca	Tarragona
14:00 (GMT)	Viguera 28'; Bergantiños (yellow card) 51'; Powel 77', (yellow card) 78'	(Report)		Stadium: Nou Estadi; Attendance: 5,000; Referee: Mariscal Sánchez

20 February 2011 25	Rayo Vallecano	1–1	Gimnàstic	Madrid
	Casado (yellow card) 37'; Aganzo (red card) 70'; Piti (yellow card) 84', (goal) 89'; Fuego (yellow card) 89'	(Report)	Powel 38'; Bergantiños (yellow card) 65'; Fuster (yellow card) 71'; Díaz (yellow card) 44' (yellow-red card) 76'; Seoane (yellow card) 78'	Stadium: Teresa Rivero; Referee: S. Jaime Latre

26 February 2011 26	Gimnàstic	1–2	Celta Vigo	Tarragona
	Morán (yellow card) 33'; Powel 70'	(Report)	Aspas 28'; Lago 55'; Murillo (yellow card) 79'	Stadium: Nou Estadi; Attendance: 4,500; Referee: D. Ocón Arráiz

2 March 2011 27	Xerez	1–2	Gimnàstic	Jerez de la Frontera (Cádiz)
	Díaz 11'; Bermejo (yellow card) 43'; Llorente (yellow card) 62'; Gioda (yellow card) 64'	(Report)	Powel 43'; Seoane (yellow card) 44'; Sanchón 53'; Rodri (yellow card) 80'; Delporte (yellow card) 88'	Stadium: Chapín; Attendance: 7,147; Referee: J. Piñeiro Crespo

6 March 2011 28	Gimnàstic	2–0	Cartagena	Tarragona
	Mairata 25'; Bergantiños (yellow card) 50'; Morán 71'	(Report)	Longás (yellow card) 27'; Mariano (yellow card) 38'; Clavero (yellow card) 44'	Stadium: Nou Estadi; Referee: J. Amoedo Chas

13 March 2011 29	Barcelona B	4–0	Gimnàstic	Barcelona
	Dos Santos 16', 48'; Thiago (yellow card) 18'; Soriano 34', 58', (yellow card) 61'; Muniesa (red card) 70'	(Report)	Fuster (yellow card) 56'; Díaz (yellow card) 61'	Stadium: Mini Estadi; Attendance: 1,643; Referee: A. Mariscal Sánchez

20 March 2011 30	Gimnàstic	1–0	Numancia	Tarragona
	Powel 21'; Delporte (yellow card) 26'; Bergantiños (yellow card) 35'; Seoane (yellow card) 66'; Sanchón (yellow card) 89'	(Report)	Dimas (yellow card) 40'; Garmendia (yellow card) 51'; Barkero (yellow card) 73'; Angulo (yellow card) 85'	Stadium: Nou Estadi; Referee: Sagues Oscoz

26 March 2011 31	Córdoba	1–0	Gimnàstic	Córdoba
	De Coz (yellow card) 30'; Díaz 38'; Alberto (yellow card) 54'	(Report)	Díaz (yellow card) 4'; Mingo (yellow card) 32'; Mairata (yellow card) 89'	Stadium: Nuevo Arcángel; Attendance: 7,000; Referee: J. Valdés Aller

2 April 2011 32	Gimnàstic	1–1	Tenerife	Tarragona
	Mairata (yellow card) 38'; Sanchón 44'; Campos (yellow card) 48'; Rey (yellow card) 86'	(Report)	Nino 26'; Dubarbier (yellow card) 39'; Luna (yellow card) 72' (yellow-red card) 76'	Stadium: Nou Estadi; Attendance: 7,201; Referee: Del Cerro Grande

9 April 2011 33	Elche	1–0	Gimnàstic	Elche
	Xumetra 86'	(Report)		Stadium: Manuel Martínez Valero; Attendance: 6,782; Referee: D. Ocón Arráiz

19 April 2011 34	Huesca	1–1	Gimnàstic	Huesca
	Molinero 26'; Pérez (yellow card) 36'; Sorribas (yellow card) 38'; Roberto (yellow card) 77'; Corona (yellow card) 84'	(Report)	Rodri (yellow card) 50'; Díaz (yellow card) 57'; Eloy 60'; Campos (yellow card) 67'	Stadium: El Alcoraz; Referee: Pérez Montero, Pedro Jesús

23 April 2011 35	Gimnàstic	2–0	Alcorcón	Tarragona
	Powel 14'; Eloy 33', (yellow card) 73'; Mingo (yellow card) 48' (yellow-red card) 64'; Rey (yellow card) 63'	(Report)	Borja (yellow card) 33'; Alberdi (yellow card) 44'; Gerardo (yellow card) 72'; Bermúdez (yellow card) 76'	Stadium: Nou Estadi; Referee: Mariscal Sánchez

30 April 2011 36	Villarreal B	0–2	Gimnàstic	Villarreal
	Mano (yellow card) 16'; Dervite (yellow card) 29'; Jaume (yellow card) 87' (yellow-red card) 41'; Carlos (yellow card) 60'; Nielsen (yellow card) 72'	(Report)	Rodri (yellow card) 21'; Navarro (yellow card) 76'; Sanchón 90' (pen.); Bergantiños (yellow card) 89'; Miki 90+2'	Stadium: Ciudad Deportiva; Referee: Pino Zamorano

7 May 2011 37	Gimnàstic	0–3	Granada	Tarragona
	Miki (yellow card) 68'	(Report)	M. Rico 37'; Geijo 65'; Collantes 69'	Stadium: Nou Estadi; Referee: J. Piñeiro Crespo

10 May 2011 38	Recreativo Huelva	1–0	Gimnàstic	Huesca
	Asen (yellow card) 31'; Aarón 34'; Manolo (yellow card) 42'; Rafita (yellow card) 71'; Mora (yellow card) 82'	(Report)	Fuster (yellow card) 48'; Mairata (yellow card) 54'	Stadium: Nuevo Colombino; Referee: G. Sagues Oscoz

14 May 2011 39	Gimnàstic	3–1	Betis	Tarragona
	Rovérsio 24' (o.g.); Ruz (yellow card) 41'; Bergantiños (yellow card) 55'; Seoane (yellow card) 55'; Powel 83' (pen.); Virgili 86'; Mairata (yellow card) 87'	(Report)	Sevilla (yellow card) 11'; Beñat (yellow card) 23'; Castro 62'; Belenguer (yellow card) 14' (yellow-red card) 78'; Rovérsio (yellow card) 26' (yellow-red card) 82'; Isidoro (yellow card) 89'; Casto (yellow card) 89'	Stadium: Nou Estadi; Referee: Sureda Cuenca, Pedro

22 May 2011 40	Valladolid	1–0	Gimnàstic	Valladolid
	Juanito (yellow card) 18'; Óscar (yellow card) 33'; Guerra 50'; Peña (yellow card) 80'; Jiménez (yellow card) 88'	(Report)	Eloy (yellow card) 25'; Ruz (yellow card) 57'	Stadium: Municipal José Zorrilla; Referee: Del Cerro Grande, Carlos

28 May 2011 41	Gimnàstic	2–1	Albacete	Tarragona
	Powel (yellow card) 6'; Sanchón 45'; Bergantiños 52'	(Report)	Toni (yellow card) 9'; Tato 41'; Miguel (yellow card) 44'; Verza (yellow card) 74'; Tarantino (yellow card) 83'	Stadium: Nou Estadi; Attendance: 13,000; Referee: S. Jaime Latre

4 June 2011 42	Ponferradina	1–1	Gimnàstic	Ponferradina
	Acorán 45'	(Report)	Morán 6'	Stadium: El Toralín; Attendance: 4,000; Referee: P. Pérez Montero

=== Copa del Rey ===
==== Second Qualifying Round ====
1 September 2010	Gimnàstic	1–2	Xerez	Tarragona
20:30 CEST	Gerardo 63', (yellow card) 83'; Cruz (yellow card) 89'	(Report)	Moreno (yellow card) 25'; Antoñito 36'; Lombán 39', (yellow card) 73'; Capi (yellow card) 47'; Capdevila (yellow card) 56'; Redondo (yellow card) 79'; Lledó (yellow card) 85'	Stadium: Nou Estadi; Referee: Pedro Sureda Cuenca

== Goalscorers ==
Position	Nation	Name	Goals scored
1	(Netherlands)	Berry Powel	11
2	(Spain)	Eloy Gila	5
3	(Spain)	Morán	4
3	(Spain)	Felipe Sanchón	4
4	(Spain)	Rodri	2
4	(Spain)	Rubén Navarro	2
4	(Spain)	Borja Viguera	2
4	(Spain)	Pedro Mairata	2
5	(Spain)	Álex Bergantiños	1
5	(Spain)	Miki	1
5	(Spain)	Albert Virgili	1
TOTAL			35

== Transfers ==
=== In ===
#	Pos	Player	From
4	DF	(Spain) Álex Ortiz	(Spain) Real Betis B
5	DF	(Spain) Sergio Díaz	(Spain) Hércules
7	MF	(Spain) Abraham	(Spain) Cádiz
12	FW	(Netherlands) Berry Powel	(Netherlands) ADO Den Haag
13	GK	(Spain) José Moragón	(Spain) Reus
16	MF	(Spain) Fernando Seoane	(Spain) Lugo
17	DF	(Spain) Raúl Fuster	(Spain) Elche
18	FW	(Spain) Juan Domínguez	(Spain) Real Unión
19	MF	(France) Ludovic Delporte	(Spain) Osasuna
20	MF	(Spain) Miki	(Spain) Hércules
21	DF	(Spain) Xisco Campos	(Spain) Real Murcia
22	DF	(Spain) Manuel Ruz	(Spain) Hércules
23	MF	(Spain) Rodri	(Spain) Hércules
24	MF	(Spain) Gerardo	(Spain) Hércules
31	MF	(Spain) Jordi Roca	(Spain) Blanes
32	FW	(Spain) Eloy Gila	(Spain) Gramenet
37	MF	(Spain) Álvaro Rey	(Spain) Real Betis B
40	GK	(Spain) Antonio David	(Spain) Sevilla Atlético
2	MF	(Spain) Álex Bergantiños	(Spain) Deportivo La Coruña (loan)
25	FW	(Spain) Borja Viguera	(Spain) Real Sociedad (loan)
18	MF	(Spain) Tuni	(Spain) Mallorca (loan)
11	FW	(Spain) Felipe Sanchón	(Italy) Udinese (loan)

=== Out ===
#	Pos	Player	To
2	MF	(Spain) Alejandro Campano	(Romania) Vaslui
19	MF	(Spain) David Bauzá	(Spain) Huesca
8	FW	(Spain) José Mari	(Spain) Xerez
25	GK	(Spain) Felip Ortiz	(Spain) Ascó
7	FW	(Spain) Roberto	(Spain) Huesca
13	GK	(Spain) Xabi Pascual	Released
11	FW	(Cameroon) Serge N'Gal	(Portugal) União de Leiria
4	DF	(Spain) Jorge	(Spain) Sporting Gijón
5	DF	(Algeria) Walid Cherfa	(Spain) Girona
21	MF	(Spain) Miguel Ángel	(Spain) Ponferradina
16	MF	(Spain) Líbero Parri	Released
23	DF	(Brazil) Pablo	(Brazil) Cruzeiro
22	DF	(Spain) Biel Medina	(Cyprus) Anorthosis Famagusta(loan)
10	MF	(Spain) Pablo Redondo	(Spain) Xerez
50	FW	(Spain) Iñigo Vélez	(Spain) Numancia
-	FW	(Spain) Aleix Vidal	(Spain) Mallorca B
12	MF	(Colombia) Mauricio Arroyo	(Colombia) Real Cartagena
18	MF	(Senegal) César Diop	Released
-	MF	(Algeria) Yanis Youcef	(Algeria) USM Blida
2	DF	(Spain) Curro Torres	Released
18	FW	(Spain) Juan Domínguez	(Spain) Eibar (loan)
7	MF	(Spain) Abraham	(Spain) Ponferradina (loan)
11	MF	(Spain) Álex Cruz	(Spain) Granada

== Results ==
=== Segunda División ===
Pos	Team	Pld	W	D	L	GF	GA	GD	Pts	Promotion, qualification or relegation
16	Córdoba	42	13	13	16	58	63	−5	52	
17	Villarreal B	42	15	6	21	43	63	−20	51	
18	Gimnàstic	42	12	13	17	37	45	−8	49	
19	Salamanca (R)	42	13	7	22	46	68	−22	46	Relegation to Segunda División B
20	Tenerife (R)	42	9	11	22	42	66	−24	38	Relegation to Segunda División B

Source: FBref – 2010–2011 Segunda Stats
Rules for classification: 1st points; 2nd head-to-head points; 3rd head-to-head goal difference; 4th head-to-head goals scored; 5th goal difference; 6th number of goals scored; 7th Fair-play points
(R) Relegated

==== Results summary ====
Overall								Home						Away					
Pld	W	D	L	GF	GA	GD	Pts	W	D	L	GF	GA	GD	W	D	L	GF	GA	GD
36	10	12	14	31	37	−6	42	6	8	4	15	10	+5	4	4	10	16	27	−11

Last updated: 30 April 2011.
Source: LFP – Liga Adelante
