= Otaegi =

Otaegi may refer to:

== People ==
- Arnaldo Otegi (born 1958), Spanish Basque politician
- Joxe Azurmendi Otaegi (1941–2025), Basque writer, philosopher, essayist and poet
- Juan Domínguez Otaegui (born 1983), Spanish retired footballer
- Leire Otaegi (born 1977), Spanish curler
- Oihane Otaegi (born 1977), Spanish curler
