= 2017–18 Sporting de Gijón season =

Real Sporting
2017–18 season
- President: Javier Fernández
- Manager: Rubén Baraja
- Stadium: El Molinón
- Segunda División: Qualified
- Copa del Rey: Third round
- Top goalscorer: League: Michael Santos (17 goals); All: Michael Santos (17 goals)
- Highest home attendance: 27,506; Real Sporting 1–1 Oviedo (9 September 2017)
- Lowest home attendance: 15,436; Real Sporting 0–1 Zaragoza (3 December 2017)
- Average home league attendance: 20,836
Home colours	Away colours	Third colours

The 2017–18 season was Real Sporting's 112th season in existence and the club's 45th season in the second flight of Spanish football, the first one since its last relegation. It covers a period from 1 July 2017 to 30 June 2018.

== Season overview ==
=== Pre-season ===
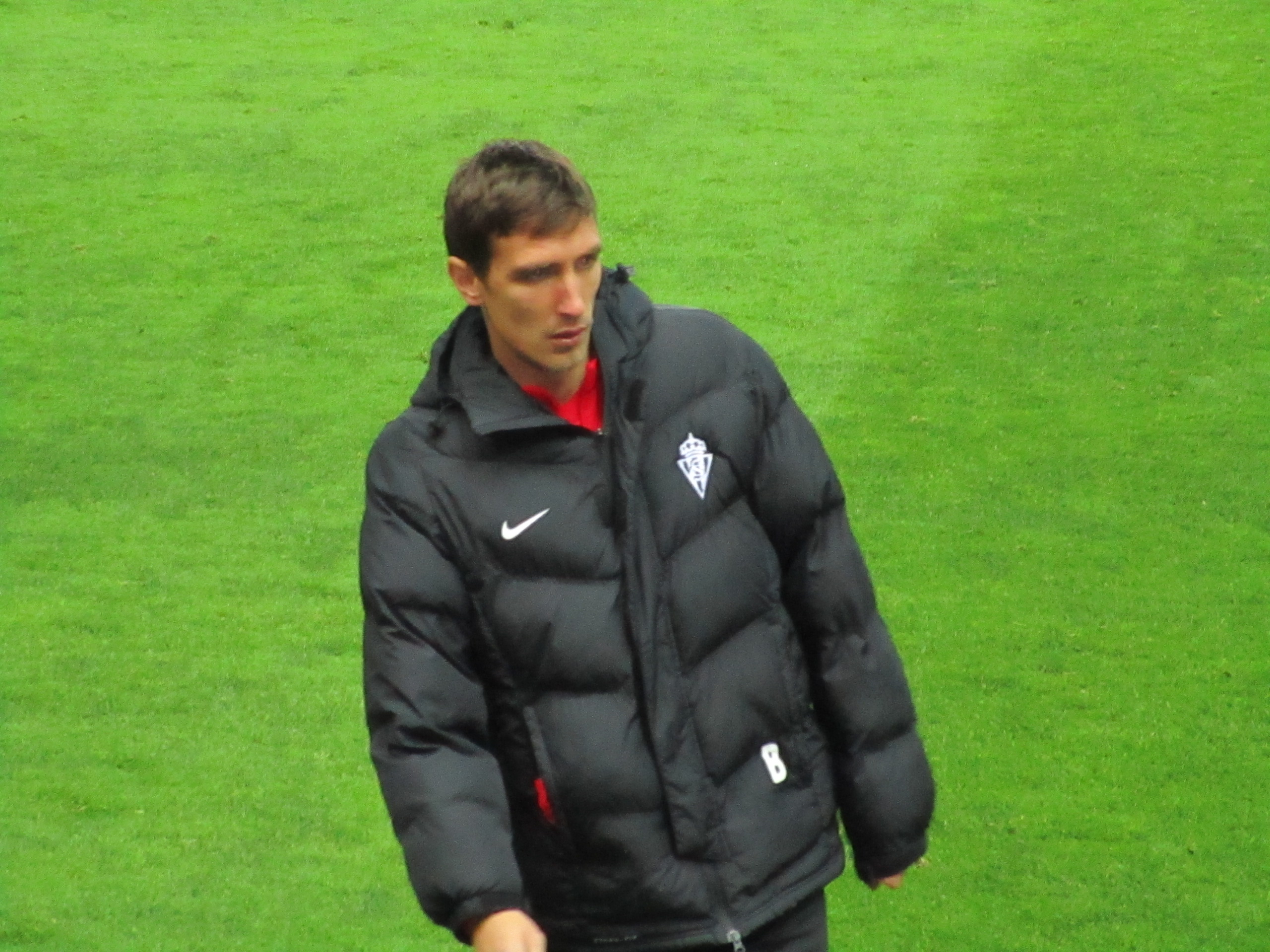
Stefan Šćepović would start his second stage in Gijón.

On 28 May 2017, Real Sporting sacked Nicolás Rodríguez after three seasons as director of football, and hired Miguel Torrecilla with the aim to replace him.

On 9 June 2017, the club announced Asturian enterprise Teslacard as the new shirt sponsor of the club. One day later, Rubi confirmed that the club would not extend his contract for one more season.

On 15 June 2017, Paco Herrera was hired as new coach after agreeing with the club a two-year contract. One week later, Nacho Cases announced he would leave the club, bringing to an end his 22-year association with the club.

Álex Bergantiños and Stefan Šćepović were the first signs, both loaned from their clubs. Šćepović came back to Gijón three season after. On 20 July 2017, Jorge Meré was transferred to German Köln for €9,000,000, becoming the highest transfer in the club's history. Four days later, he would be replaced by Italian center back Federico Barba, who signed for the next four seasons. Real Sporting paid €1,700,000 to Italian club Empoli F.C.

On 1 August 2017, Real Sporting ended the renewal of season tickets with 21,274; the club's record in Segunda División. Two days later, the club announced that Carlos Castro and Carlos Carmona renewed their contracts until 2022 and 2021 respectively.

Pre-season ended with five more incorporations, two of them on loan: Xandão, Juan Sebastián Quintero (on loan from Deportivo Cali), Michael Santos (on loan from Málaga), Álex Pérez and Álex López.

=== August ===
Sporting played their first official match of the season on 19 August 2017, earning one point at Alcorcón. Due to the high temperatures during the game, cooling breaks were introduced. This arrangement was used for the first time in Spain during this season. Eight days later, the club made its home debut against Lugo and achieved the first win of the season, after beating the Galicians by 2–0. Carlos Carmona and Michael Santos scored the goals for the win that positioned Real Sporting in the second place at the end of the second round.

In this match, Nacho Méndez made his professional debut as a starter, but he was replaced during the halftime. One day later, on 29 August, Real Sporting agreed with Eibar the loan of right back Jordi Calavera for one season.

On 31 August 2017, Real Sporting ended the transfer window by rescinding the contracts of Lillo and Dani Ndi and loaning Jean-Sylvain Babin to Maccabi Tel Aviv.

=== September ===
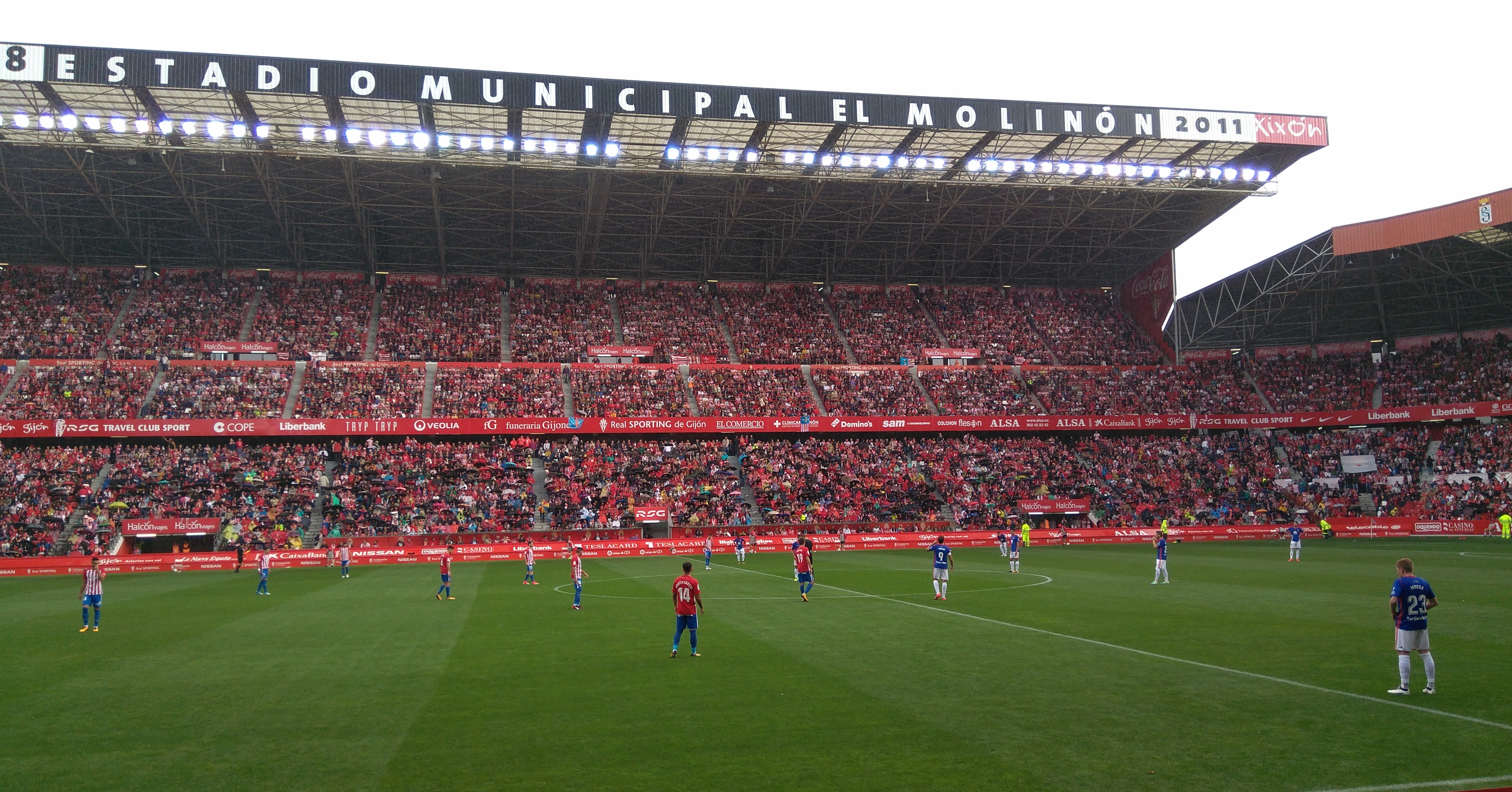
Kick off of the Asturian derby, played officially for the first time since 2003.

On 3 September 2017, Real Sporting reached the first position of the table after beating Gimnàstic 4–0 away and taking advantage of the loss of Tenerife against Valladolid. This leadership arrived just one week before playing the Asturian derby against Oviedo, 14 years after both teams meet for the last time in official competition. The derby ended with a 1–1 draw, despite scoring first thanks to a header of Carlos Carmona, as Oviedo made the equalizer with only five minutes left. Before it, in the surroundings of the stadium, there were altercations between the National Police and the ultras of Real Sporting, ending with damages in the buses of both clubs and 12 arrested people.

Real Sporting lost its first match, one week later, in Soria, after being defeated 0–3 by Numancia. Three days later, Real Sporting was eliminated by this team after drawing 1–1 and losing 1–3 in the penalty shootout. Previously, they beat Reus in the first round.

The club ended the month in the first position, after beating Lorca FC and taking advantage of other results. However, despite the leadership, the performance of the club was criticized by an important crowd of the supporters.

=== October ===
Criticism to the team play continued after the 2–0 defeat on 1 October against Osasuna. However, the club continued unbeaten at home by achieving a new win at El Molinón, this time by 3–0 against Sevilla Atlético. In this match, Real Sporting missed two penalty kicks: firstly Stefan Šćepović, who scored twice, and later Carlos Castro in the additional time, after trying a Panenka.

The club continued the undefeated streak at Estadio Reino de León, where they beat Cultural Leonesa by 2–0, in a match where 2,000 supporters travelled to León for a match played on Tuesday and later, only earning a 1–1 draw against Huesca despite going ahead.

On 16 October, Real Sporting announced, despite the relegation, it beat the record of season tickets sold with 24,402. The club ended the month with four more points after a 1–1 draw at Rayo Vallecano and a 2–0 win at home against Almería, for a streak of five consecutive matches without losses that allowed the club to end October in the third position, with the same points as second qualified Granada, and only one point less than Lugo, that reached the leadership of the league for the first time in their history.

=== November ===
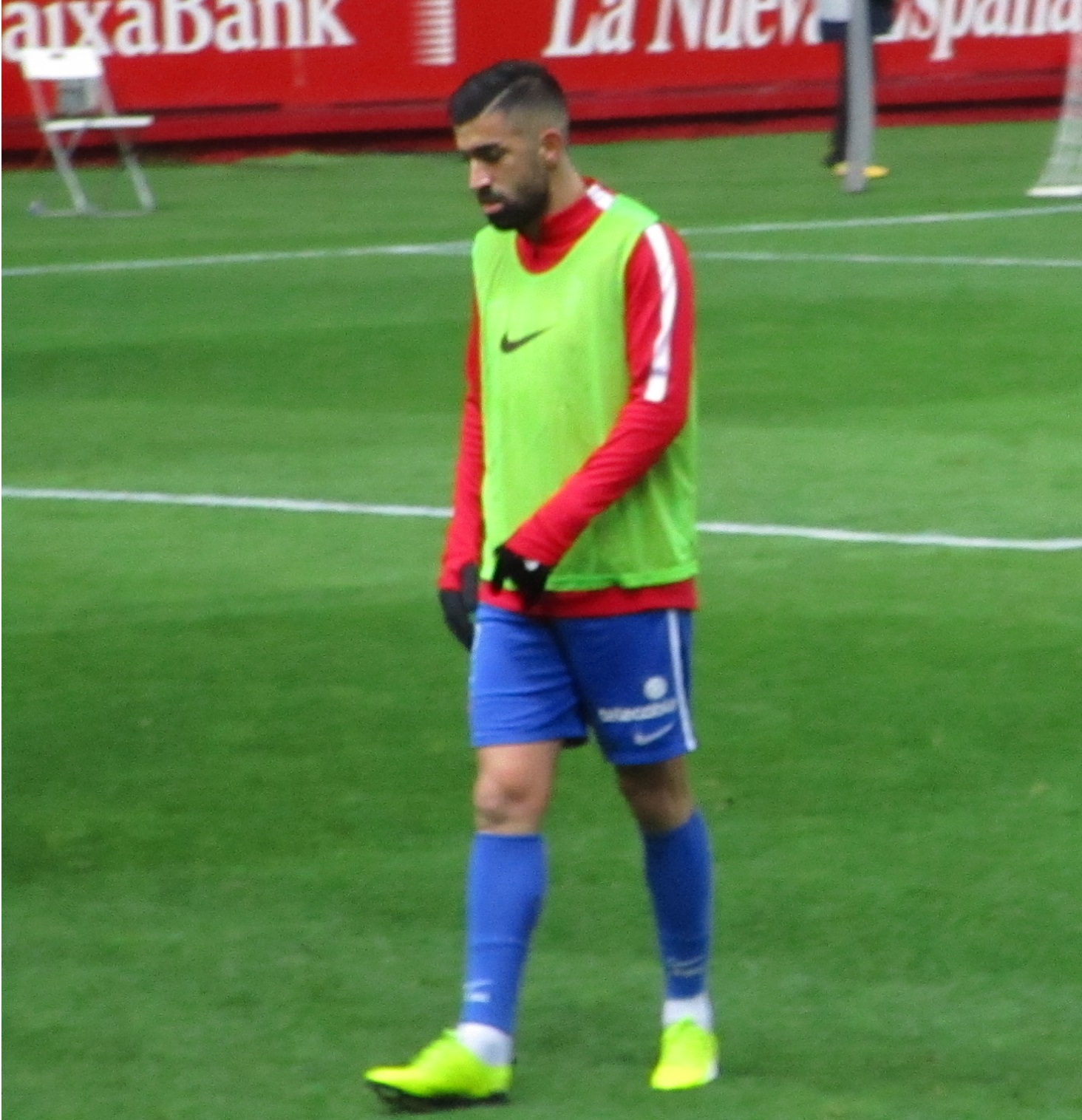
Santos, warming up before a match.

November was disastrous for Sporting, who only earned two points in the four matches played in this month.

It started with a loss at the Estadi Municipal de Reus, against Reus, by 1–0, after a free kick scored by Luís Gustavo. One week later, Real Sporting tied in the homer match against Valladolid, in another game where Sporting could not save the three points after scoring first, in a match were Sergio Álvarez got injured in the warm up.

The crisis increased in the club after the first loss at home, on 21 November, against Cádiz by 0–3 with former player David Barral scoring the last goal, and dropped to the eighth position in the league table. This match was remarkable as it was the first one ever without any Asturian player in the starting team. The month ended with an away 2–2 draw against Albacete, with Michael Santos scoring a brace for overcoming the first goal of Roman Zozulya.

=== December ===
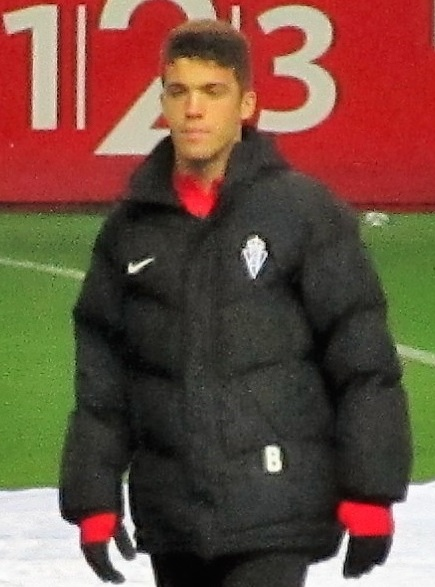
Nacho Méndez, renewed until 2021.

Sporting accumulated two losses against Zaragoza and Barcelona B, increasing the streak to six matches without wins. With these numbers, the club dropped to the tenth position in the league table.

On 11 December, the board of directors agreed to sack Paco Herrera and to hire former Valencia player Rubén Baraja as the new head coach. Baraja was confirmed as manager on 12 December. He started his tenure in Sporting with a huge win by 3–0 against Tenerife, but the team showed the same problems when it plays away, during the match at Granada, that ended with a 1–2 loss.

On 22 December, B-side player Nacho Méndez extended his contract until 2021.

=== January ===
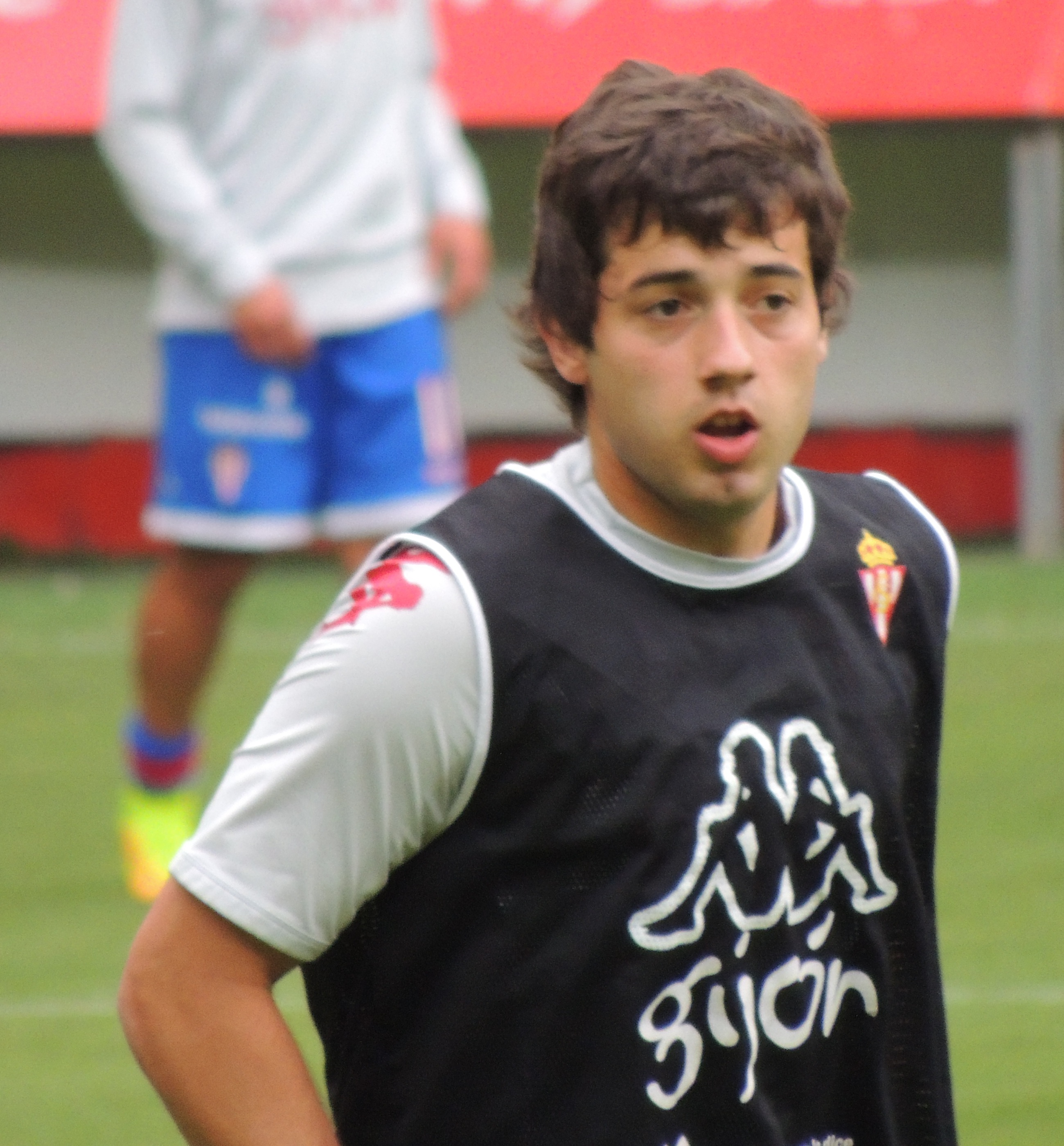
Jony came back in January 2018, for the second half of the season.

2018 started for Sporting with a 3–2 win against Córdoba, that were in relegation positions, with Michael Santos netting his second brace in the season. In this match, Sergio Álvarez came back to the starting XI after an absence of one month due to an injury.

On 11 January, former player Jony arrived to Gijón for signing until the end of the season, on loan from Málaga. The club announced his return the next day. One day later after the press release, Real Sporting won again in their second match of the year, this time against Alcorcón by a wide 3–0.

On 18 January, goalkeeper Diego Mariño extended his contract with the club until 2022. One day later, Rachid Aït-Atmane was loaned to Belgian side Waasland-Beveren. and on 20 January, Real Sporting lost 3–1 to CD Lugo, in a match where after four missed penalty kicks, Carmona netted one. Also in this game, rival goalkeeper Juan Carlos scored a goal.

On 26 January, midfielder Moi Gómez was loaned to Huesca until the end of the season. Just minutes later, the club announced the sign up of Hernán Santana from La Liga club Las Palmas, until 2021.

The last match of the month ended with a 2–0 win against Gimnàstic thanks to a new goal of Michael Santos and other one made by Rubén García. This was the debut with the first team of right back Adrián Montoro.

In the last day of the month, Getafe and Sporting agreed to terminate the loan of Stefan Šćepović, who played 16 league games and scored four goals in his second stage in Gijón, and was transferred to Hungarian club Videoton. And just hours before the end of the winter market, Real Sporting agreed the loans of Nano Mesa from Eibar and Alberto Guitián, who played in Sporting three years ago, from Valladolid.

=== February ===
On 4 February, Real Sporting lost 2–1 against Oviedo in the second Asturian derby of the season, despite scoring first thanks to a goal of Jony. However, the team redeemed itself by beating Numancia in the next week by 2–0, achieving coach Rubén Baraja his fifth consecutive win at El Molinón.

In the third match of the month, Real Sporting continued without winning away and only could earn one goalless draw against Lorca FC, that cut their streak of ten consecutive losses. Jony missed a penalty kick in the first half, becoming this one the fifth shot missed in the season out of seven tries.

The last match of the month ended with a new home win, the sixth consecutive, against Osasuna by 2–0, with goals of Rubén García and Michael Santos, and the team showing a completely different performance at home and away.

On 27 February, all-time Sporting's top scorer Quini died at the age of 68 after suffering a heart attack.

=== March ===
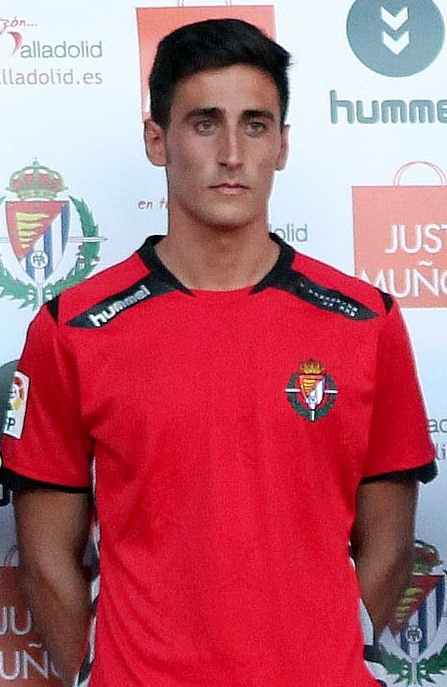
Diego Mariño was unbeaten during seven consecutive matches.

With a 0–1 win against last qualified Sevilla Atlético, Real Sporting came back to the play-offs positions fifteen rounds after the last time. Sporting continued their unbeaten streak by defeating 4–0 Cultural Leonesa, in a match where Quini was honored, and leaders Huesca away by 2–0.

On 24 March, Real Sporting beat the leader again, this time Rayo Vallecano thanks to an own goal. Goalkeeper Diego Mariño continued unbeaten by seventh consecutive match.

=== April ===
On 1 April, Real Sporting came back provisionally to the leadership after beating 1–3 Almería and taking advantage of the draw between Rayo Vallecano and Cádiz and the postponement of the match between Huesca and Albacete. Michael Santos, who scored his 16th goal in the first minutes, became injured and Diego Mariño ended his streak of 764 minutes unbeaten by receiving a penalty kick scored by Rubén Alcaraz. One week later, the team beat Reus 2–1 for earning their seventh consecutive win, equaling the best streak of the club, in the 1979–80 season.

This record would be beaten at Valladolid, by achieving also the tenth consecutive match without losing. Rubén García scored the only goal in the game played at Estadio José Zorrilla, with more than 4,000 supporters who travelled from Gijón for watching the match. The winning streak would end after a goalless draw at Estadio Ramón de Carranza, against Cádiz CF. However, Real Sporting would continue their streak of 11 games unbeaten, all the league matches played after losing the Asturian derby.

On 25 April 2018, Jony was named Player of the Month of March. He received the award at El Molinón on 29 April, before the last match of the month, that ended with a 2–1 win against Albacete. He and Carmona scored the goals for continuing in the second position after 37 rounds played.

=== May ===
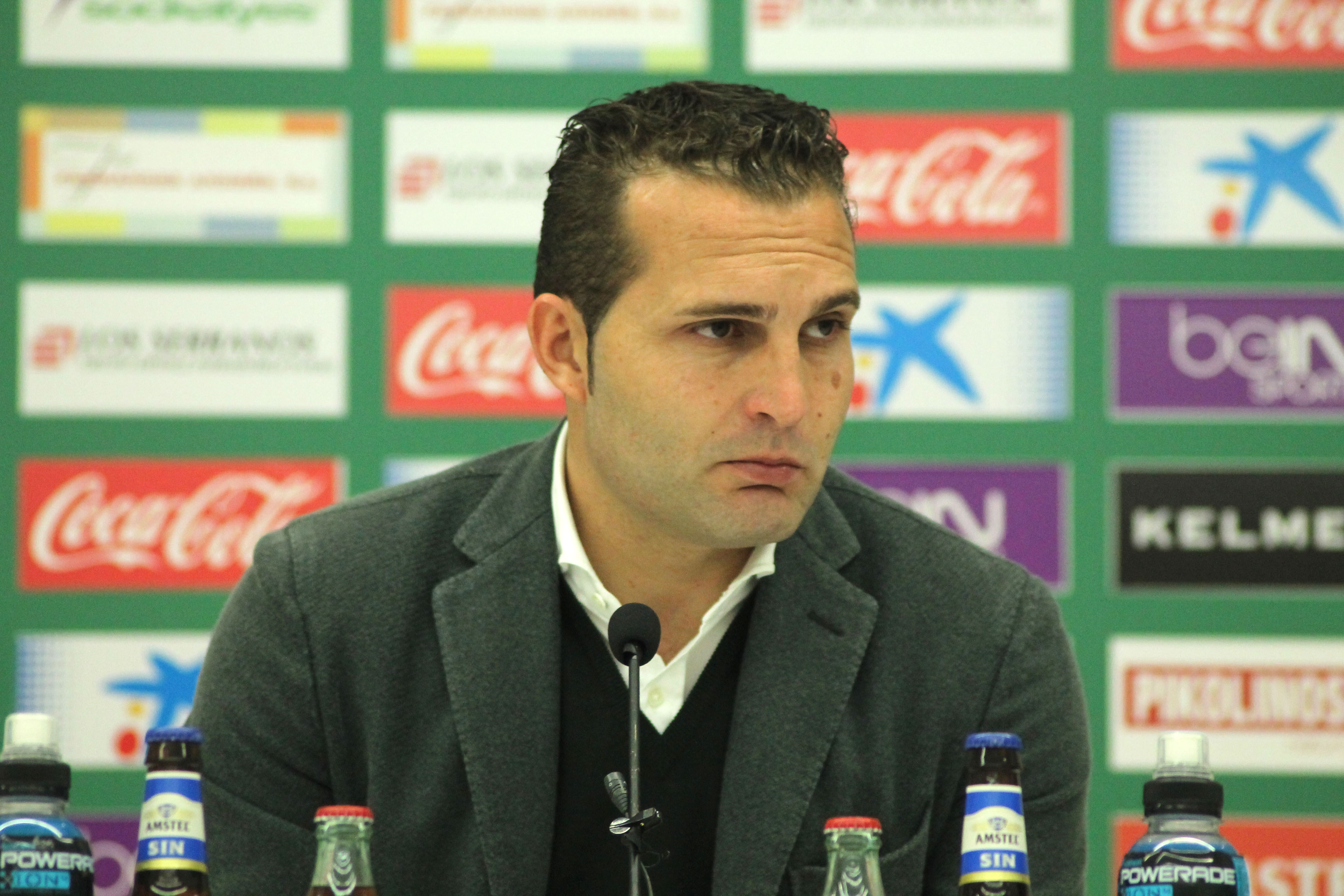
Rubén Baraja was sanctioned with four matches.

Real Sporting could not continue their unbeaten streak and was dropped to the third position after a 2–1 loss against Real Zaragoza at La Romareda. In the two next weeks, the club would practically end its options to directly promote to La Liga after another two consecutive losses: firstly a surprising one at El Molinón, by 2–3 against Barcelona and later, against Tenerife with a goal in the 81st minute. In the first of these two matches, manager Rubén Baraja was sent off and later sanctioned with four matches after impeding a throw-in.

On 27 May, with the win of Rayo Vallecano against Lugo and the win in the previous round of Huesca against the same team, Real Sporting terminated its options to directly promote to La Liga. However, a 2–1 win against Granada was enough to assure the qualification to the promotion playoffs.

=== June ===
Real Sporting finished the regular season with a calamitous 3–0 loss at Córdoba, ending the regular season in the fourth place and losing the status of top seeded team in the promotion playoffs

The first match of this stage was played on 7 June at Estadio José Zorrilla, Valladolid. The Castilians beat Real Sporting by 3–1 thanks to ten great minutes where they scored the three goals. Jony nailed in the second half the only goal for the Asturians.

There were not any options for Real Sporting at the second leg, as Valladolid quickly avoided any possibility of comeback with two goals in the first half of the match. Carmona, booed when he was replaced, made the last goal of the season by scoring a penalty kick in the 68th minute.

== Players ==
=== Current squad ===
N	Pos.	Nat.	Name	Age	Since	App	Goals	Ends	Transfer fee	Notes
1	GK	(Spain)	Óscar Whalley	24	2016	0	0	2018	Free	
4	MF	(Spain)	Álex Bergantiños	33	2017	0	0	2018	Free	
5	DF	(Italy)	Federico Barba	24	2017	0	0	2021	€1.7m	
6	MF	(Spain)	Sergio Álvarez	26	2013	145	9	2021	Youth system	
7	FW	(Uruguay)	Michael Santos	25	2017	0	0	2018	Free	
8	MF	(Spain)	Hernán Santana	27	2018	0	0	2021	Free	
9	FW	(Spain)	Carlos Castro	23	2014	80	20	2022	Youth system	
10	MF	(Spain)	Carlos Carmona	30	2012	150	24	2021	Free	
11	DF	(Spain)	Alberto Lora (captain)	31	2007	247	4	2018	Youth system	
13	GK	(Spain)	Diego Mariño	28	2016	2	0	2022	Undisclosed	
14	MF	(Spain)	Rubén García	24	2017	0	0	2018	Free	
15	DF	(Spain)	Roberto Canella	30	2008	253	8	2019	Youth system	
16	MF	(Spain)	Jony	26	2018	82	14	2018	Free	
17	DF	(Spain)	Álex López	30	2017	0	0	2018	Free	
18	DF	(Spain)	Isma López	28	2013	103	8	2019	Free	
19	FW	(Spain)	Nano	23	2018	0	0	2018	Free	
20	DF	(Colombia)	Juan Sebastián Quintero	23	2017	0	0	2018	Free	
21	FW	(Spain)	Borja Viguera	31	2016	16	1	2018	Free	
22	MF	(Spain)	Pablo Pérez	24	2017	58	7	2020	Youth system	
23	DF	(Spain)	Alberto Guitián	27	2018	1	0	2018	Free	
24	DF	(Spain)	Álex Pérez	26	2017	0	0	2019	Free	
25	DF	(Spain)	Jordi Calavera	22	2017	0	0	2018	Free	

- Source: Ages to 30 June 2018. Stats updated as of the end of the 2016–17 season. Only league games included.
- Ordered by squad number.

=== From the reserve team ===
Note: Flags indicate national team as defined under FIFA eligibility rules; some limited exceptions apply. Players may hold more than one non-FIFA nationality.

No.	Pos.	Nation	Player
26	DF	ESP	Montoro
27	MF	ESP	Pedro Díaz
28	MF	ESP	Nacho Méndez
29	DF	ESP	Juan Rodríguez

No.	Pos.	Nation	Player
30	DF	ESP	Víctor Ruiz
31	DF	ESP	Carlos Cordero
32	GK	ESP	Dani Martín

=== In ===
No.	Pos.	Nat.	Name	Age	Moving from	Type	Transfer window	Ends	Transfer fee	Source
22	MF	(Spain)	Pablo Pérez	23	Alcorcón	End of loan	Summer	2019	Free	
8	DF	(Algeria)	Rachid Aït-Atmane	24	Tenerife	End of loan	Summer	2018	Free	
	DF	(Spain)	Álvaro Bustos	22	Mirandés	End of loan	Summer	2020	Free	
	DF	(Spain)	Julio Rodríguez	27	(England) Barnsley	End of loan	Summer	2018	Free	
4	MF	(Spain)	Álex Bergantiños	32	Deportivo La Coruña	Loan	Summer	2018	Free	
19	FW	(Serbia)	Stefan Šćepović	27	Getafe	Loan	Summer	2018	Free	
5	DF	(Italy)	Federico Barba	23	(Italy) Empoli	Transfer	Summer	2021	€1m	
14	MF	(Spain)	Rubén García	24	Levante	Loan	Summer	2018	Free	
20	DF	(Colombia)	Juan Sebastián Quintero	22	(Colombia) Deportivo Cali	Loan	Summer	2018	Free	
2	DF	(Brazil)	Xandão	29	(Russia) Anzhi	Transfer	Summer	2018	Free	
7	FW	(Uruguay)	Michael Santos	24	Málaga	Loan	Summer	2018	Free	
24	DF	(Spain)	Álex Pérez	26	Valladolid	Transfer	Summer	2018	Free	
17	MF	(Spain)	Álex López	29	Celta Vigo (Note: Last season played loaned in Valladolid.)	Transfer	Summer	2018	Free	
25	DF	(Spain)	Jordi Calavera	22	Eibar (Note: Last season played loaned in Lugo.)	Loan	Summer	2018	Free	
16	MF	(Spain)	Jony	26	Málaga	Loan	Winter	2018	Free	
8	MF	(Spain)	Hernán Santana	27	Las Palmas	Transfer	Winter	2021	Free	
23	DF	(Spain)	Alberto Guitián	27	Valladolid	Loan	Winter	2018	Free	
19	FW	(Spain)	Nano	22	Eibar (Note: Previously loaned at Levante.)	Loan	Winter	2018	Free	

=== Out ===
No.	Pos.	Nat.	Name	Age	Moving to	Type	Transfer window	Transfer fee	Source
2	DF	(Brazil)	Douglas	26	Barcelona	End of loan	Summer	Free	
8	FW	(Ivory Coast)	Lacina Traoré	26	(France) Monaco	End of loan	Summer	Free	
10	MF	(Spain)	Nacho Cases	29	(Cyprus) AEK Larnaca	Resigned	Summer	Free	
12	FW	(Nigeria)	Elderson Echiéjilé	29	(France) Monaco	End of loan	Summer	Free	
14	MF	(Spain)	Burgui	23	Real Madrid	End of loan	Summer	Free	
17	FW	(Qatar)	Akram Afif	20	Villarreal	End of loan	Summer	Free	
22	MF	(Spain)	Mikel Vesga	24	Athletic Bilbao	End of loan	Summer	Free	
20	FW	(Croatia)	Duje Čop	27	(Italy) Cagliari	End of loan	Summer	Free	
21	MF	(Spain)	Xavi Torres	30	(Australia) Perth Glory	End of contract	Summer	Free	
1	GK	(Spain)	Iván Cuéllar	33	Leganés	Resigned	Summer	Free	
5	DF	(Venezuela)	Fernando Amorebieta	32	(Argentina) Independiente	Transfer	Summer	Free	
4	DF	(Spain)	Jorge Meré	20	(Germany) Köln	Transfer	Summer	€9.0	
7	MF	(Spain)	Víctor Rodríguez	28	(United States) Seattle Sounders	Transfer	Summer	Free	
	MF	(Spain)	Julio Rodríguez	27	Recreativo	Mutual consent	Summer	Free	
	MF	(Spain)	Álvaro Bustos	22	Gimnàstic	Mutual consent	Summer	Free	
3	DF	(Martinique)	Jean-Sylvain Babin	30	(Israel) Maccabi Tel Aviv	Loan	Summer	Free	
12	MF	(Cameroon)	Dani Ndi	22	Mallorca	Terminated	Summer	Free	
16	DF	(Spain)	Lillo	28	Osasuna	Transfer	Summer	Free	
8	MF	(Algeria)	Rachid Aït-Atmane	24	(Belgium) Waasland-Beveren	Loan	Winter	Free	
23	MF	(Spain)	Moi Gómez	23	Huesca	Loan	Winter	Free	
19	FW	(Serbia)	Stefan Šćepović	28	Getafe	End of loan	Winter	Free	
2	DF	(Brazil)	Xandão	29	(Belgium) Cercle Brugge	Mutual consent	Winter	Free	

=== Current technical staff ===
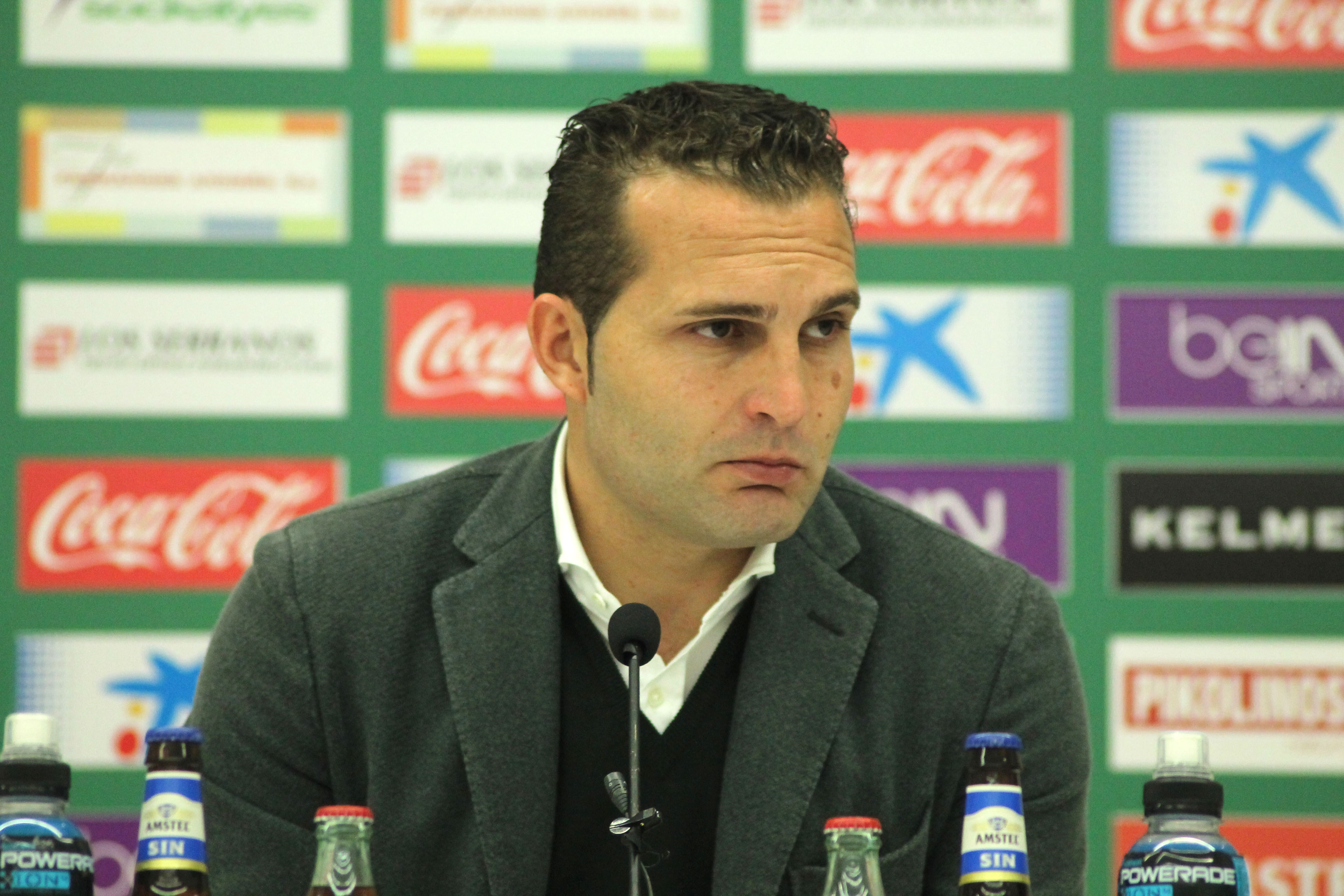
Rubén Baraja replaced Paco Herrera as head coach.

Position	Staff
Manager	(Spain) Rubén Baraja
Assistant Manager	(Spain) José Ramón Rodríguez
Goalkeeping Coach	(Spain) Diego Tuero
Delegate	(Spain) Mario Cotelo
Director of Football	(Spain) Miguel Torrecilla
Academy Director	(Spain) Manolo Sánchez Murias

Source: Real Sporting

=== Managerial changes ===
Outgoing manager	Manner of departure	Date of vacancy	Position in table	Replaced by	Date of appointment
(Spain) Paco Herrera	Sacked	11 December 2017	10th	(Spain) Rubén Baraja	12 December 2017

== Pre-season and friendlies ==
Due to the conservation works of the pitch of El Molinón, the Trofeo Villa de Gijón was not played this pre-season.

19 July 2017 Friendly	Guijuelo	0–5	Real Sporting	Villares de la Reina
		Report	Víctor Rodríguez 20'; Pablo Fernández 29'; Viguera 47'; Moi Gómez 52'; Pablo Pérez 55'	Stadium: Helmántico; Referee: González Hernández

22 July 2017 Trofeo Isidro Silveira (45-minute game)	Celta Vigo	2–0	Real Sporting	Ferrol
	Brais Méndez 6'; Iago Aspas 36' (pen.)	Report		Stadium: A Malata

22 July 2017 Trofeo Isidro Silveira (45-minute game)	Racing Ferrol	0–3	Real Sporting	Ferrol
		Report	Šćepović 36'; Nacho Méndez 40'; Pablo Fernández 44'	Stadium: A Malata

25 July 2017 Friendly	Barakaldo	1–0	Real Sporting	Barakaldo
	Buenacasa 19'	Report		Stadium: Lasesarre; Referee: González Esteban

29 July 2017 Friendly	Real Sporting	1–0	Ponferradina	Vegadeo
	Claudio 78'	Report		Stadium: El Soutón; Referee: Nieto Martín

2 August 2017 Trofeo Ciudad de Pontevedra	Pontevedra	1–3	Real Sporting	Pontevedra
	Jorge 35'	Report	Juan Rodríguez 25'; Pablo Pérez 59'; Rubén García 81'	Stadium: Pasarón; Referee: Martínez Santos

4 August 2017 Friendly	Real Sporting	3–2	Eibar	Villaviciosa
	Šćepović 22'; Viguera 33'; Rubén García 59'	Report	Iván Alejo 36'; Bebé 64'	Stadium: Les Caleyes; Referee: González Fuertes

9 August 2017 Friendly	Real Sporting	1–1	Racing Santander	Luanco, Gozón
	Héber 56' (pen.)	Report	Viguera 75' (pen.)	Stadium: Miramar; Attendance: 3,054; Referee: Areces Franco

12 August 2017 Friendly	Real Sporting	2–2	Real Sociedad	Palencia
	Juanmi 15'; Xabi Prieto 56'	Report	Carmona 21'; Castro 61'	Stadium: Nueva Balastera; Attendance: 2,100; Referee: Rubén Becerril

== Competitions ==
=== Segunda División ===
==== League table ====
Pos	Team	Pld	W	D	L	GF	GA	GD	Pts	Promotion, qualification or relegation
2	Huesca (P)	42	21	12	9	61	40	+21	75	Promotion to La Liga
3	Zaragoza	42	20	11	11	57	44	+13	71 (Note: Zaragoza finished ahead of Sporting Gijón on head-to-head points: Sporting Gijón 0–1 Zaragoza, Zaragoza 2–1 Sporting Gijón)	Qualification for promotion play-offs
4	Sporting Gijón	42	21	8	13	60	40	+20	71	Qualification for promotion play-offs
5	Valladolid (O, P)	42	19	10	13	69	55	+14	67	Qualification for promotion play-offs
6	Numancia	42	18	11	13	52	41	+11	65 (Note: Numancia finished ahead of Oviedo on head-to-head goal difference: Oviedo 3–1 Numancia, Numancia 3–0 Oviedo)	Qualification for promotion play-offs

Source: La Liga
Rules for classification: 1) points; 2) head-to-head points; 3) head-to-head goal difference; 4) goal difference; 5) number of goals scored
(O) Play-off winners; (P) Promoted

==== Results summary ====
Overall								Home						Away					
Pld	W	D	L	GF	GA	GD	Pts	W	D	L	GF	GA	GD	W	D	L	GF	GA	GD
42	21	8	13	60	40	+20	71	15	3	3	39	15	+24	6	5	10	21	25	−4

==== Positions by round ====
Round	1	2	3	4	5	6	7	8	9	10	11	12	13	14	15	16	17	18	19	20	21	22	23	24	25	26	27	28	29	30	31	32	33	34	35	36	37	38	39	40	41	42
Ground	A	H	A	H	A	H	A	H	A	H	A	H	A	H	H	A	H	A	H	A	H	H	A	H	A	H	A	H	A	H	A	H	A	H	A	A	H	A	H	A	H	A
Result	D	W	W	D	L	W	L	W	W	D	D	W	L	D	L	D	L	L	W	L	W	W	L	W	L	W	D	W	W	W	W	W	W	W	W	D	W	L	L	L	W	L
Position	15	2	1	2	8	1	6	3	2	3	3	3	4	5	8	8	9	10	8	10	9	9	10	9	10	9	10	7	5	4	4	3	1	1	1	2	2	3	3	3	3	4

Source: BDFútbol
A = Away; H = Home; W = Win; D = Draw; L = Loss

==== Matches ====
19 August 2017 1	Alcorcón	0–0	Real Sporting	Alcorcón
19:00	Bellvís (yellow card) 90+5'	Report	Lora (yellow card) 68'; Barba (yellow card) 90+6'	Stadium: Santo Domingo; Attendance: 2,864; Referee: Sagués Oscoz

27 August 2017 2	Real Sporting	2–0	Lugo	Gijón
19:00	Carmona 62' (yellow card) 71'; Santos 73'	Report		Stadium: El Molinón; Attendance: 22,926; Referee: Valdés Aller

2 September 2017 3	Gimnàstic	0–4	Real Sporting	Tarragona
18:00	Uche (yellow card) 57'; Perales (yellow card) 62'	Report	Xavi Molina 8' (o.g.); Šćepović 15'; Lora (yellow card) 33'; Rubén García 45'; Mariño (yellow card) 48'; Santos 63' (pen.); Carmona (yellow card) 84'	Stadium: Nou Estadi; Attendance: 6,373; Referee: Cordero Vega

9 September 2017 4	Real Sporting	1–1	Oviedo	Gijón
18:00	Carmona 13'; Rubén García (yellow card) 59'; Lora (yellow card) 79'	Report	Cotugno (yellow card) 24'; Yeboah (yellow card) 32'; Verdés (yellow card) 40'; Christian Fernández (yellow card) 62'; Toché 85'	Stadium: El Molinón; Attendance: 27,506; Referee: Guillermo Cuadra Fernández

16 September 2017 5	Numancia	0–3	Real Sporting	Soria
20:30	Pablo Valcarce 13', 68'; Escassi 32' (yellow card) 90+2'	Report	Santos (yellow card) 90+2'; Castro (yellow card) 90+4'	Stadium: Los Pajaritos; Attendance: 3,076; Referee: Arcediano Monescillo

23 September 2017 6	Real Sporting	1–0	Lorca FC	Gijón
18:00	Carmona (penalty missed) 43'; Rubén García 43'; Calavera 90+1'	Report	Nando (yellow card) 81'; Merentiel (yellow card) 90+1'	Stadium: El Molinón; Attendance: 20,974; Referee: Vicandi Garrido

1 October 2017 7	Osasuna	2–0	Real Sporting	Pamplona
18:00	Roberto Torres 9'; Lucas Torró (yellow card) 11'; Lillo (yellow card) 22'; David Rodríguez 59'; Fran Mérida (yellow card) 71'; Sergio Herrera (yellow card) 77'	Report	Álex Pérez (yellow card) 83'; Pablo Pérez (yellow card) 90'	Stadium: El Sadar; Attendance: 15,505; Referee: De la Fuente Ramos

7 October 2017 8	Real Sporting	3–0	Sevilla Atlético	Gijón
16:00	Šćepović (penalty missed) 17' 38', 77'; Calavera (yellow card) 23'; Sergio Álvarez 49'; Castro (penalty missed) 90+2'	Report	David Carmona (yellow card) 16'; Caro (yellow card) 55'; Carlos Fernández (yellow card) 90'	Stadium: El Molinón; Attendance: 20,142; Referee: Pérez Pallas

11 October 2017 9	Cultural Leonesa	0–2	Real Sporting	León
21:00		Report	Barba (yellow card) 49'; Sergio Álvarez 65'; Bergantiños 66'	Stadium: Reino de León; Attendance: 11,567; Referee: Eiriz Mata

13 October 2017 10	Real Sporting	1–1	Huesca	Gijón
21:00	Carmona 51'; Calavera (yellow card) 61'; Sergio Álvarez (yellow card) 69'	Report	Melero 62' (pen.)	Stadium: El Molinón; Attendance: 21,206; Referee: Figueroa Vázquez

22 October 2017 11	Rayo Vallecano	1–1	Real Sporting	Madrid
18:00	Raúl de Tomás 43'	Report	Santos 6' (yellow card) 47'; Álex Pérez (yellow card) 50'; Isma López (yellow card) 87'	Stadium: Vallecas; Attendance: 10,266; Referee: López Toca

28 October 2017 12	Real Sporting	2–0	Almería	Gijón
20:00	Santos 16'; Joaquín 37' (o.g.); Sergio Álvarez (yellow card) 69'; Isma López (yellow card) 85'	Report	Joaquín (yellow card) 80'	Stadium: El Molinón; Attendance: 20,919; Referee: Prieto Iglesias

4 November 2017 13	Reus	1–0	Real Sporting	Reus
20:30	Atienza (yellow card) 48'; Luís Gustavo 68'	Report	Barba (yellow card) 80'	Stadium: Municipal; Attendance: 1,548; Referee: Ocón Arraiz

12 November 2017 14	Real Sporting	1–1	Valladolid	Gijón
20:30	Šćepović 5'; Bergantiños (yellow card) 24'; Calavera (yellow card) 27'; Santos (yellow card) 30'; Rubén García (yellow card) 50'	Report	Nacho (yellow card) 45'; Deivid (yellow card) 57'; Borja (yellow card) 68'; Toni Villa (yellow card) 70'; Luismi 75'	Stadium: El Molinón; Attendance: 18,986; Referee: Cordero Vega

19 November 2017 15	Real Sporting	0–3	Cádiz	Gijón
20:30	Mariño (yellow card) 85'	Report	Garrido 23'; Álvaro García 64'; Cifuentes (yellow card) 81'; Bijker (yellow card) 90+1'; Barral 90+5'	Stadium: El Molinón; Attendance: 19,544; Referee: Díaz de Mera Escuderos

26 November 2017 16	Albacete	2–2	Real Sporting	Albacete
20:00	Zozulya 31'; Dani Rodríguez (yellow card) 44'; Saveljich (yellow card) 52'; Gaffoor 81'	Report	Rachid (yellow card) 18'; Barba (yellow card) 52'; Santos 63', 70'	Stadium: Carlos Belmonte; Attendance: 7,833; Referee: Varón Aceitón

3 December 2017 17	Real Sporting	0–1	Zaragoza	Gijón
20:30	Rachid (yellow card) 28'; Santos (penalty missed) 86'; Calavera (yellow card) 90+3'	Report	Delmás 68' (yellow card) 79'; Verdasca (yellow card) 85'	Stadium: El Molinón; Attendance: 15,436; Referee: López Toca

8 December 2017 18	Barcelona B	2–1	Real Sporting	Barcelona
21:00	Aleñá 14'; Arnaiz 37'; Cucurella (yellow card) 73'	Report	Álex Pérez 50'; Nacho Méndez (yellow card) 67'; Isma López (yellow card) 90+3'	Stadium: Mini Estadi; Attendance: 1,699; Referee: Moreno Aragón

17 December 2017 19	Real Sporting	3–0	Tenerife	Gijón
18:00	Santos 5'; Nacho Méndez (yellow card) 13'; Carmona 32'; Moi Gómez 89'	Report	Camille (yellow card) 37'; Acosta (yellow card) 68' (yellow-red card) 76'; Casadesús (yellow card) 90+3'; Aitor Sanz (yellow card) 90+4'	Stadium: El Molinón; Attendance: 20,013; Referee: Milla Alvendiz

20 December 2017 20	Granada	2–1	Real Sporting	Granada
21:00	Pedro (yellow card) 23'; Joselu 60' (pen.); Álex Pérez 86' (o.g.)	Report	Carmona (yellow card) 39'; Juan Rodríguez (yellow card) 59'; Santos 90+2'; Bergantiños (yellow card) 90+4'	Stadium: Nuevo Los Cármenes; Attendance: 9,770; Referee: Pizarro Gómez

6 January 2018 21	Real Sporting	3–2	Córdoba	Gijón
16:00	Castro 11'; Santos 19', 59' (yellow card) 73'	Report	Aguza 50'; Guardiola 63'; Fernández (yellow card) 70'; Alfaro (yellow card) 78'	Stadium: El Molinón; Attendance: 16,120; Referee: Varón Aceitón

13 January 2018 22	Real Sporting	3–0	Alcorcón	Gijón
18:00	Dorca 24' (o.g.); Carmona 49'; Calavera (yellow card) 54'; Santos 89'	Report	Sangalli (yellow card) 23'; Burgos (yellow card) 90+4'	Stadium: El Molinón; Attendance: 19,340; Referee: Gorostegui Fernández-Ortega

20 January 2018 23	Lugo	3–1	Real Sporting	Lugo
20:30	Iriome 10'; Jaime 64'; Fede Vico (yellow card) 74'; Juan Carlos 80'	Report	Carmona 57' (pen.); Álex Pérez (yellow card) 79'	Stadium: Ángel Carro; Referee: Figueroa Vázquez

28 January 2018 24	Real Sporting	2–0	Gimnàstic	Gijón
16:00	Santos 45'; Rubén García 65'	Report	Suzuki (yellow card) 18'; Manu Barreiro (yellow card) 20'; Juan Muñiz (yellow card) 25'; Xavi Molina (yellow card) 54'	Stadium: El Molinón; Attendance: 21,122; Referee: Ais Reig

4 February 2018 25	Oviedo	2–1	Real Sporting	Oviedo
18:00	Mossa 31', 46' (yellow card) 33'; Ñíguez (yellow card) 56'; Diegui (yellow card) 85'	Report	Jony 21'; Bergantiños (yellow card) 37'; Carmona (yellow card) 57'; Barba (yellow card) 82'	Stadium: Carlos Tartiere; Attendance: 25,996; Referee: López Toca

10 February 2018 26	Real Sporting	2–0	Numancia	Gijón
16:00	Carmona (yellow card) 27'; Calavera 50'; Jony 72'; Nano (yellow card) 77'	Report	Del Moral (yellow card) 34'; Carlos Gutiérrez (yellow card) 46'; Nacho (yellow card) 55'; Dani Calvo (yellow card) 63'; Mateu (yellow card) 86'; Larrea (yellow card) 89'	Stadium: El Molinón; Attendance: 18,103; Referee: Pizarro Gómez

17 February 2018 27	Lorca FC	0–0	Real Sporting	Lorca
20:00	Pomares (yellow card) 44'	Report	Jony (penalty missed) 27'; Sergio Álvarez (yellow card) 69'	Stadium: Francisco Artés Carrasco; Attendance: 4,066; Referee: Milla Alvendiz

23 February 2018 28	Real Sporting	2–0	Osasuna	Gijón
21:00	Rubén García 4'; Barba (yellow card) 42'; Bergantiños (yellow card) 50'; Calavera (yellow card) 73'; Santos 76' (yellow card) 82'; Isma López (yellow card) 89'	Report	Oier (yellow card) 7'; Lillo (yellow card) 29'; Aridane (yellow card) 74'	Stadium: El Molinón; Attendance: 18,763; Referee: Arcediano Monescillo

4 March 2018 29	Sevilla Atlético	0–1	Real Sporting	Seville
18:00	Cristian González (yellow card) 29'; Konyk (yellow card) 66'; Eteki (yellow card) 78'	Report	Rubén García 31'; Nano (yellow card) 39'; Bergantiños (yellow card) 89'	Stadium: Viejo Nervión; Attendance: 651; Referee: Prieto Iglesias

11 March 2018 30	Real Sporting	4–0	Cultural Leonesa	Gijón
18:00	Sergio Álvarez (yellow card) 15'; Hernán (yellow card) 33'; Carmona (yellow card) 36' (goal) 58'; Jony 38'; Pablo Pérez 84'; Nano 87'	Report	Señé (yellow card) 69'; Martínez (yellow card) 87'	Stadium: El Molinón; Attendance: 25,186; Referee: Sagués Oscoz

19 March 2018 31	Huesca	0–2	Real Sporting	Huesca
21:00	Aguilera (yellow card) 15'; Pulido (yellow card) 79'	Report	Santos (yellow card) 14' (goal) 33', 58'; Carmona (yellow card) 54'; Nacho Méndez (yellow card) 82'	Stadium: El Alcoraz; Attendance: 4,283; Referee: Pérez Pallas

24 March 2018 32	Real Sporting	1–0	Rayo Vallecano	Gijón
20:45	Elustondo 68' (o.g.); Bergantiños (yellow card) 86'	Report	Unai López (yellow card) 82'; Raúl de Tomás (yellow card) 90+3'	Stadium: El Molinón; Attendance: 21,705; Referee: Eiriz Mata

1 April 2018 33	Almería	1–3	Real Sporting	Almería
18:00	Alcaraz (yellow card) 30' (goal) 90+3' (pen.); Estupiñán (yellow card) 31'; Pozo (yellow card) 66'; Morcillo (yellow card) 70'; Lass (yellow card) 80'	Report	Santos 10' (yellow card) 36'; Canella (yellow card) 23'; Hernán 79'; Sergio Álvarez (yellow card) 86'; Jony 90'; Álex Pérez (yellow card) 90+2'	Stadium: Mediterráneo; Attendance: 7,566; Referee: Díaz de Mera Escuderos

8 April 2018 34	Real Sporting	2–1	Reus	Gijón
18:00	Nano 20'; Carmona 31'; Bergantiños (yellow card) 76'; Nacho Méndez (yellow card) 90+3'	Report	Álex Menéndez (yellow card) 28'; Olmo 50'; Máyor (yellow card) 71'	Stadium: El Molinón; Attendance: 22,803; Referee: Ocón Arraiz

15 April 2018 35	Valladolid	0–1	Real Sporting	Valladolid
16:00	Rubén García 3'; Calavera (yellow card) 39'; Bergantiños (yellow card) 82'	Report	Borja (yellow card) 17'; Nacho (yellow card) 49'; Moyano (yellow card) 63'; Gianniotas (yellow card) 83'; Toni Martínez (yellow card) 90+2'	Stadium: José Zorrilla; Attendance: 14,184; Referee: Cordero Vega

22 April 2018 36	Cádiz	0–0	Real Sporting	Cádiz
18:00		Report	Rubén García (yellow card) 51'; Carmona (yellow card) 90+6'	Stadium: Ramón de Carranza; Attendance: 15,622; Referee: Gorostegui Fernández-Ortega

29 April 2018 37	Real Sporting	2–1	Albacete	Gijón
16:00	Jony 31' (yellow card) 43'; Nano (yellow card) 70'; Sergio Álvarez (yellow card) 77'; Carmona 87'	Report	Dani Rodríguez 44' (pen.); De la Hoz (yellow card) 56'; Zozulya (yellow card) 80'; Gaffoor (yellow card) 94'	Stadium: El Molinón; Attendance: 23,126; Referee: Figueroa Vázquez

5 May 2018 38	Zaragoza	2–1	Real Sporting	Zaragoza
18:00	Borja Iglesias 10', 28'; Eguaras (yellow card) 45'; Mikel González (yellow card) 46'; Zapater (yellow card) 78'	Report	Sergio Álvarez (yellow card) 32'; Rubén García 53'	Stadium: La Romareda; Attendance: 26,472; Referee: Ais Reig

12 May 2018 39	Real Sporting	2–3	Barcelona B	Gijón
16:00	Rubén García 29'; Santos 61'; Barba (yellow card) 66'	Report	Aleñá 12' (yellow card) 68'; Cardona 36' (yellow card) 71'; David Costas (yellow card) 50'; Cucurella (yellow card) 62'; Ruiz de Galarreta (yellow card) 66' (yellow-red card) 92'; Nahuel 81'	Stadium: El Molinón; Attendance: 21,207; Referee: Prieto Iglesias

18 May 2018 40	Tenerife	1–0	Real Sporting	Santa Cruz de Tenerife
21:00	Malbašić 82'; Suso (yellow card) 89'	Report	Jony (yellow card) 89'	Stadium: Heliodoro Rodríguez López; Attendance: 8,123; Referee: Guillermo Cuadra Fernández

27 May 2018 41	Real Sporting	2–1	Granada	Gijón
20:30	Lora 19'; Santos (yellow card) 56'; Barba 61'	Report	Germán 53'; Montoro (yellow card) 69'; Baena (yellow card) 76'	Stadium: El Molinón; Attendance: 19,707; Referee: Díaz de Mera Escuderos

2 June 2018 42	Córdoba	3–0	Real Sporting	Córdoba
20:30	Guardiola 10'; Alex Quintanilla 31'; Aythami (yellow card) 44'; Aguado 90'	Report	Álex Pérez (yellow card) 30'; Pablo Pérez (yellow card) 33'; Álex López (yellow card) 43'	Stadium: Nuevo Arcángel; Attendance: 20,341; Referee: López Toca

=== Play-offs ===
==== Matches ====
7 June 2018 Semifinals; First leg	Valladolid	3–1	Real Sporting	Valladolid
20:30	Calero 29'; Hervías 35'; Calavera 37' (o.g.); Borja Fernández (yellow card) 62'; Ontiveros (yellow card) 80'; Mata (yellow card) 83'	Report	Sergio Álvarez (yellow card) 28'; Carmona (yellow card) 34'; Jony 70'; Calavera (yellow card) 90+1'	Stadium: José Zorrilla; Attendance: 22,520; Referee: Díaz de Mera Escuderos

10 June 2018 Semifinals; Second leg	Real Sporting	1–2 (2–5 agg.)	Valladolid	Gijón
20:30	Carmona 68' (pen.); Bergantiños (yellow card) 70'; Álex López (yellow card) 82'	Report	Mata 23'; Óscar Plano 31'	Stadium: El Molinón; Attendance: 23,886; Referee: Sagués Oscoz

=== Copa del Rey ===
6 September 2017 Second round	Reus	0–1	Real Sporting	Reus
20:00	Édgar Hernández (penalty missed) 5'; Juan Domínguez (yellow card) 33'; Álex Menéndez (penalty missed) 59'	Report	Nacho Méndez 51'	Stadium: Municipal; Attendance: 2,753; Referee: Ocón Arraiz

19 September 2017 Third round	Real Sporting	1–1 (a.e.t.) (1–3 p)	Numancia	Gijón
20:00	Šćepović 5'	Report	Higinio 36'	Stadium: El Molinón; Attendance: 13,076; Referee: Gorostegui Fernández-Ortega
	Penalties
	Álex López (penalty missed); Moi Gómez (penalty missed); Santos; Álex Pérez (penalty missed)		Del Moral; Medina (penalty missed); Pere Milla; Nacho

== Statistics ==
=== Appearances and goals ===
No.	Pos	Nat	Player	Total		La Liga		Copa del Rey		Playoffs	
No.	Pos	Nat	Player	Apps	Goals	Apps	Goals	Apps	Goals	Apps	Goals
1	GK	(Spain) ESP	Óscar Whalley	2	0	1+0	0	1+0	0	0+0	0
4	MF	(Spain) ESP	Álex Bergantiños	40	1	35+1	1	2+0	0	2+0	0
5	DF	(Italy) ITA	Federico Barba	41	1	37+1	1	0+1	0	2+0	0
6	MF	(Spain) ESP	Sergio Álvarez	35	2	33+0	2	0+0	0	2+0	0
7	FW	(Uruguay) URU	Michael Santos	39	17	31+5	17	0+1	0	2+0	0
8	MF	(Spain) ESP	Hernán Santana	9	1	3+6	1	0+0	0	0+0	0
9	FW	(Spain) ESP	Carlos Castro	21	1	5+14	1	1+1	0	0+0	0
10	MF	(Spain) ESP	Carlos Carmona	43	10	40+1	9	0+0	0	2+0	1
11	MF	(Spain) ESP	Alberto Lora	10	1	7+1	1	1+0	0	1+0	0
13	GK	(Spain) ESP	Diego Mariño	43	0	41+0	0	0+0	0	2+0	0
14	MF	(Spain) ESP	Rubén García	42	8	33+7	8	0+0	0	2+0	0
15	DF	(Spain) ESP	Roberto Canella	35	0	33+1	0	0+0	0	1+0	0
16	MF	(Spain) ESP	Jony	23	6	17+4	5	0+0	0	2+0	1
17	MF	(Spain) ESP	Álex López	13	0	3+6	0	2+0	0	0+2	0
18	FW	(Spain) ESP	Isma López	30	0	16+11	0	2+0	0	1+0	0
19	FW	(Spain) ESP	Nano Mesa	17	2	7+9	2	0+0	0	0+1	0
20	DF	(Colombia) COL	Juan Sebastián Quintero	6	0	5+0	0	1+0	0	0+0	0
21	FW	(Spain) ESP	Borja Viguera	12	0	5+6	0	1+0	0	0+0	0
22	MF	(Spain) ESP	Pablo Pérez	26	1	2+21	1	2+0	0	0+1	0
23	DF	(Spain) ESP	Alberto Guitián	6	0	6+0	0	0+0	0	0+0	0
24	DF	(Spain) ESP	Álex Pérez	37	1	34+1	1	1+0	0	1+0	0
25	DF	(Spain) ESP	Jordi Calavera	35	1	29+3	1	1+1	0	1+0	0
26	DF	(Spain) ESP	Montoro	2	0	2+0	0	0+0	0	0+0	0
27	MF	(Spain) ESP	Pedro Díaz	1	0	0+0	0	1+0	0	0+0	0
28	MF	(Spain) ESP	Nacho Méndez	13	1	4+7	0	1+1	1	0+0	0
29	DF	(Spain) ESP	Juan Rodríguez	9	0	7+1	0	0+0	0	1+0	0
32	GK	(Spain) ESP	Dani Martín	2	0	0+0	0	2+0	0	0+0	0
Players who have left the club after the start of the season:
2	DF	(Brazil) BRA	Xandão	4	0	1+1	0	2+0	0	0+0	0
8	MF	(Algeria) ALG	Rachid Aït-Atmane	4	0	2+2	0	0+0	0	0+0	0
19	FW	(Serbia) SRB	Stefan Šćepović	17	5	12+4	4	1+0	1	0+0	0
23	MF	(Spain) ESP	Moi Gómez	23	1	10+11	1	1+1	0	0+0	0

- Source: BDFútbol

=== Disciplinary record ===
N	P	Nat.	Name	Segunda			Playoffs			Copa del Rey			Total			Notes
N	P	Nat.	Name	Yellow card	Second yellow card	Red card	Yellow card	Second yellow card	Red card	Yellow card	Second yellow card	Red card	Yellow card	Second yellow card	Red card	Notes
9	FW	(Spain)	Carlos Castro			1									1	
4	MF	(Spain)	Álex Bergantiños	8			1						9			
10	MF	(Spain)	Carlos Carmona	8			1						9			4 times captain
25	DF	(Spain)	Jordi Calavera	7			1			1			9			
6	MF	(Spain)	Sergio Álvarez	7			1						8			5 times captain
7	FW	(Uruguay)	Michael Santos	8									8			
5	DF	(Italy)	Federico Barba	7									7			
24	DF	(Spain)	Álex Pérez	5									5			
17	MF	(Spain)	Álex López	2			1			1			4			
28	MF	(Spain)	Nacho Méndez	4									4			
11	MF	(Spain)	Alberto Lora	3									3			2 times captain
14	MF	(Spain)	Rubén García	3									3			
18	FW	(Spain)	Isma López	3									3			2 times captain
19	FW	(Spain)	Nano Mesa	3									3			
13	GK	(Spain)	Diego Mariño	2									2			
16	MF	(Spain)	Jony	2									2			
22	MF	(Spain)	Pablo Pérez	2									2			
8	MF	(Spain)	Hernán Santana	1									1			
15	DF	(Spain)	Roberto Canella	1									1			34 times captain
29	DF	(Spain)	Juan Rodríguez	1									1			
1	GK	(Spain)	Óscar Whalley													
20	DF	(Colombia)	Juan Sebastián Quintero													
21	FW	(Spain)	Borja Viguera													
23	DF	(Spain)	Alberto Guitián													
27	MF	(Spain)	Pedro Díaz													
32	GK	(Spain)	Dani Martín													
Players who have left the club after the start of the season:
2	DF	(Brazil)	Xandão							1			1			
8	MF	(Algeria)	Rachid Aït-Atmane	2									2			
19	FW	(Serbia)	Stefan Šćepović													
23	MF	(Spain)	Moi Gómez													

Source: BDFútbol
Only competitive matches
(yellow card) = Number of bookings; (second yellow card) = Number of sending offs after a second yellow card; (red card) = Number of sending offs by a direct red card.
