= Albert Virgili =

Spanish footballer (born 1983)

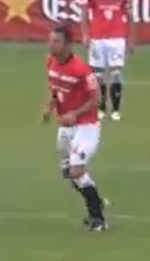
- Virgili playing for Gimnàstic in 2013

Personal information
- Full name: Albert Virgili Fort
- Date of birth: 12 February 1983 (age 43)
- Place of birth: Tarragona, Spain
- Height: 1.84 m (6 ft 0 in)
- Position: Forward

Youth career
- Gimnàstic

Senior career*
Years	Team	Apps	(Gls)
2001–2002	Gimnàstic	0	(0)
2002–2003	Universidad Zaragoza	18	(12)
2003–2004	Zaragoza B	22	(2)
2004–2005	Novelda	10	(0)
2005–2006	Reus	1	(0)
2006	Sporting Mahonés		
2006–2009	Pobla Mafumet	106	(63)
2009–2010	Kitchee	15	(12)
2010–2011	Pobla Mafumet	45	(18)
2011	Gimnàstic	5	(1)
2011–2012	Llagostera	21	(8)
2012–2013	Gimnàstic	15	(2)
2013–2016	Ascó	89	(31)
2016–2018	Tortosa	42	(38)
2018	Inter d'Escaldes	6	(2)
Total		395	(189)
- * Club domestic league appearances and goals

Albert Virgili Fort (born 12 February 1983) is a Spanish former professional footballer who played as a forward.

== Career ==
Born in Tarragona, Catalonia, Virgili emerged through Gimnàstic de Tarragona's youth ranks. He was promoted to the first team for 2001–02, but did not make any Segunda División appearances for the club – the season also ended in relegation – going on to resume his career in the lower leagues. In 2006, he returned to his native region and joined CF Pobla de Mafumet, Nàstic's farm team.

Virgili moved abroad in 2009, signing with Kitchee SC in Hong Kong. In the following transfer window, however, he rejoined Pobla; during his spell with the latter, he consistently ranked as team top scorer.

In March 2011, Virgili signed a contract with Gimnàstic, being an emergency replacement to severely injured Borja Viguera. His first match for the side occurred on 2 April, coming from the bench for Berry Powel in a 1–1 home draw against CD Tenerife; he scored his first second level goal on 15 May, netting the last in a 3–1 home win over Real Betis.

At the end of the campaign, Virgili was released and signed with neighbouring UE Llagostera in Segunda División B. On 15 July 2012, he returned to his previous team, freshly relegated from division two.

On 26 June 2013, after scoring just twice in 486 minutes of play during the third division season, Virgili was released by Gimnàstic. On 15 July, he signed with FC Ascó and, after just one season, the 30-year-old was appointed football coordinator at another former club Pobla de Mafumet, but continued to play as a senior for Ascó.

In July 2016, Virgili left Ascó and signed for CD Tortosa in the regional leagues, helping the club in their promotion to Primera Catalana in his first season. He moved to Andorran side Inter Club d'Escaldes in February 2018, subsequently retiring with the club in the end of the season at the age of 35.
