= Álex Bergantiños =

Spanish footballer (born 1985)

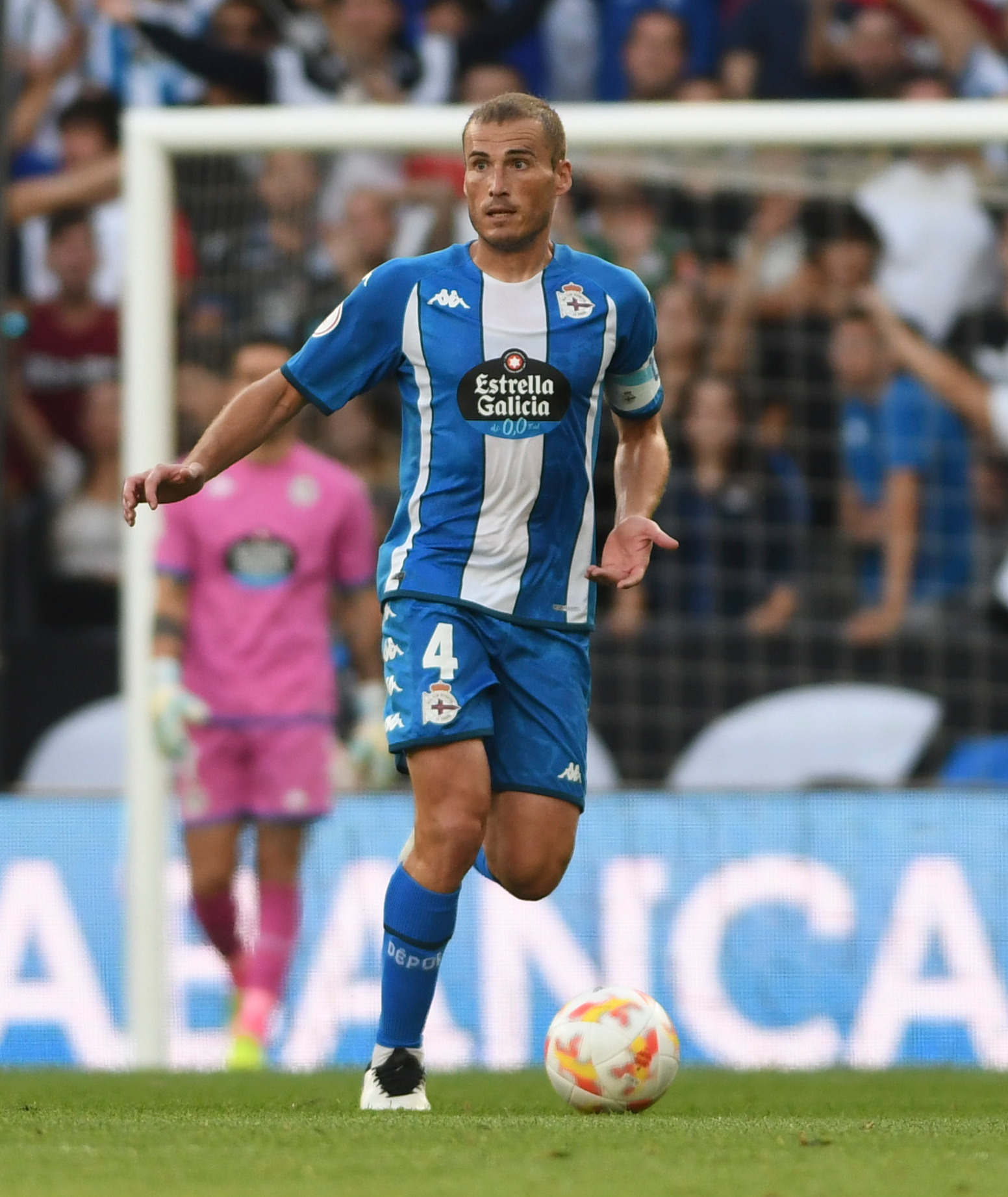
- Bergantiños with Deportivo in 2022

Personal information
- Full name: Alejandro Bergantiños García
- Date of birth: 7 June 1985 (age 41)
- Place of birth: A Coruña, Spain
- Height: 1.77 m (5 ft 10 in)
- Position: Defensive midfielder

Youth career
- 1993–2002: Imperátor OAR
- 2002–2004: Deportivo La Coruña

Senior career*
| Years | Team | Apps | (Gls) |
| 2004–2008 | Deportivo B | 97 | (10) |
| 2008–2023 | Deportivo La Coruña | 318 | (9) |
| 2008–2010 | → Xerez (loan) | 57 | (0) |
| 2010–2011 | → Granada (loan) | 6 | (0) |
| 2011 | → Gimnàstic (loan) | 22 | (1) |
| 2017–2018 | → Sporting Gijón (loan) | 36 | (1) |
| Total | | 536 | (21) |
- * Club domestic league appearances and goals

Alejandro "Álex" Bergantiños García (born 7 June 1985) is a Spanish former professional footballer who played as a defensive midfielder.

He spent his entire career contracted to Deportivo, making 336 official appearances and being loaned to several other teams. He played 118 La Liga games for Deportivo and Xerez and 247 in the Segunda División for those two, Granada, Gimnàstic and Sporting de Gijón.

== Career ==
Bergantiños was born in A Coruña. He had his first professional spell as a footballer in 2008, at already 23: loaned by local club Deportivo de La Coruña, he was an essential midfield figure as Xerez CD achieved a first-ever top flight promotion – 31 games, 21 starts and 2,085 minutes played.

In very late August 2009, after tying him to the club for four more years, Depor agreed to loan Bergantiños once again to the Andalusians, in another season-long move. He made his La Liga debut on 30 August, playing the last 30 minutes in a 2–0 away loss against RCD Mallorca, and produced roughly the same numbers than in the previous year as the Andalusians were immediately relegated.

Bergantiños moved on loan to Granada CF for the 2010–11 campaign. He left in January 2011 to begin yet another loan, at Segunda División rivals Gimnàstic de Tarragona.

Bergantiños returned to Galicia in 2011–12, and soon became a regular, appearing in all the league games and helping his team achieve promotion back to the top flight. He scored his first goal in the competition on 20 October 2012, but in a 5–4 home defeat to FC Barcelona. Weeks later, he extended his contract until 2016, with a buyout clause of €10 million.

In September 2015, Bergantiños signed a new deal lasting until 2018. On 12 December that year, against Barcelona again but at the Camp Nou, he helped the visitors come from behind 2–0 to draw it 2–2 by netting in the 85th minute.

On 2 March 2017, in his first league game of the season, Bergantiños had an accidental collision with Fernando Torres, from which the Atlético Madrid striker suffered cranial injuries; he visited the opponent in hospital shortly afterwards. Ten days later, he scored the winner in a 2–1 victory over reigning champions Barcelona at the Estadio Riazor.

On 11 July 2017, shortly after committing himself to another year at Deportivo, Bergantiños was loaned to Sporting de Gijón for one year. Upon returning home, he became the captain.

Bergantiños remained at Deportivo following their historic relegation to Segunda División B in 2020. The 35-year-old skipper signed a new deal on 5 October that year, to last until 2022.

Bergantiños retired in summer 2023.

== Career statistics ==
Appearances and goals by club, season and competition
| Club | Season | League | | | National cup | | Other | | Total | |
| Club | Season | Division | Apps | Goals | Apps | Goals | Apps | Goals | Apps | Goals |
|---|---|---|---|---|---|---|---|---|---|---|
| Deportivo La Coruña | 2004–05 | La Liga | 0 | 0 | 0 | 0 | — | | 0 | 0 |
| Deportivo La Coruña | 2006–07 | La Liga | 0 | 0 | 0 | 0 | — | | 0 | 0 |
| Deportivo La Coruña | 2011–12 | Segunda División | 42 | 3 | 1 | 0 | — | | 43 | 3 |
| Deportivo La Coruña | 2012–13 | La Liga | 29 | 1 | 0 | 0 | — | | 29 | 1 |
| Deportivo La Coruña | 2013–14 | Segunda División | 37 | 0 | 1 | 0 | — | | 38 | 0 |
| Deportivo La Coruña | 2014–15 | La Liga | 33 | 0 | 1 | 0 | — | | 34 | 0 |
| Deportivo La Coruña | 2015–16 | La Liga | 22 | 2 | 2 | 0 | — | | 24 | 2 |
| Deportivo La Coruña | 2016–17 | La Liga | 8 | 1 | 1 | 0 | — | | 9 | 1 |
| Deportivo La Coruña | 2018–19 | Segunda División | 35 | 1 | 0 | 0 | 3 (Note: Appearances in La Liga play-offs) | 1 | 38 | 2 |
| Deportivo La Coruña | 2019–20 | Segunda División | 38 | 1 | 1 | 0 | — | | 39 | 1 |
| Deportivo La Coruña | 2020–21 | Segunda División B | 21 | 0 | 2 | 0 | — | | 23 | 0 |
| Deportivo La Coruña | 2021–22 | Primera Federación | 33 | 0 | 1 | 0 | 2 (Note: Appearances in Primera Federación play-offs) | 1 | 36 | 1 |
| Deportivo La Coruña | 2022–23 | Primera Federación | 20 | 0 | 1 | 0 | 2 | 0 | 23 | 0 |
| Deportivo La Coruña | Total | | 318 | 9 | 11 | 0 | 7 | 2 | 336 | 11 |
| Xerez (loan) | 2008–09 | Segunda División | 31 | 0 | 1 | 0 | — | | 32 | 0 |
| Xerez (loan) | 2009–10 | La Liga | 26 | 0 | 2 | 0 | — | | 28 | 0 |
| Xerez (loan) | Total | | 57 | 0 | 3 | 0 | 0 | 0 | 60 | 0 |
| Granada (loan) | 2010–11 | Segunda División | 6 | 0 | 1 | 0 | — | | 7 | 0 |
| Gimnàstic (loan) | 2010–11 | Segunda División | 22 | 1 | 0 | 0 | — | | 22 | 1 |
| Sporting Gijón (loan) | 2017–18 | Segunda División | 36 | 1 | 2 | 0 | 2 | 0 | 40 | 1 |
| Career total | | | 439 | 11 | 17 | 0 | 9 | 2 | 465 | 13 |

== Honours ==
Xerez

- Segunda División: 2008–09

Deportivo

- Segunda División: 2011–12
