= Eloy Gila =

Spanish association football player (born 1988)

Personal information
- Full name: Eloy Gila Marín
- Date of birth: 21 June 1988 (age 38)
- Place of birth: Sabadell, Spain
- Height: 1.75 m (5 ft 9 in)
- Position: Forward

Youth career
- Sabadell Nord
- Sabadell
- 2003–2007: Josep María Gene

Senior career*
| Years | Team | Apps | (Gls) |
| 2007–2009 | Gramenet B | 72 | (11) |
| 2009–2010 | Gramenet | 29 | (2) |
| 2010 | Pobla Mafumet | 2 | (0) |
| 2010–2013 | Gimnàstic | 57 | (6) |
| 2012 | → Betis B (loan) | 14 | (2) |
| 2013–2016 | Llagostera | 89 | (16) |
| 2016 | → Sabadell (loan) | 14 | (1) |
| 2016–2018 | Albacete | 31 | (3) |
| 2017–2018 | → Mirandés (loan) | 23 | (0) |
| 2018–2022 | Cornellà | 108 | (16) |
| 2022–2024 | Santa Coloma | 51 | (13) |
| 2024–2025 | Manresa | 32 | (5) |
- * Club domestic league appearances and goals as of 15:03, 25 January 2026 (UTC)

Eloy Gila Marín (born 21 June 1988) is a Spanish professional footballer who plays as a forward.

== Club career ==
Born in Sabadell, Barcelona, Catalonia, Gila made his professional debut with UDA Gramenet in the Segunda División B, after playing two years with the reserves. In 2010 he signed with another club in his native region, Gimnàstic de Tarragona of Segunda División, initially as part of the farm team, CF Pobla de Mafumet.

However, Gila appeared in only two games for Pobla, and after scoring five goals in the main squad's preseason he was summoned by first-team manager Luis César Sampedro. He made his competitive debut on 19 September, coming on as a substitute for Álex Cruz in the 75th minute of a 0–1 home defeat against Rayo Vallecano.

Gila scored his first goal for Nàstic on 16 October 2010, in a 1–1 home draw with FC Barcelona B. He finished the season as the side's second-best scorer at five (only behind Berry Powel), as they narrowly avoided relegation.

Gila could not reproduce his previous form in the 2011–12 campaign, and after the arrival of Hugo Bargas in the January transfer window lost his importance in the first team. He was then loaned to third-tier Real Betis B on a six-month contract, playing his first match on 5 February against Cádiz CF and scoring his first goal later that month in the 2–1 away win over CD San Roque de Lepe.

On 23 January 2013, Gila was released by Gimnàstic. He signed for neighbouring UE Llagostera the following day, scoring a career-best 11 times in his first full season – plus once in the play-offs – as they reached division two for the first time ever.

Gila remained in the third division until his retirement, with CE Sabadell FC, Albacete Balompié, CD Mirandés and UE Cornellà. He achieved promotion with the second of those clubs.

Gila then spent two seasons in the Andorran Primera Divisió with FC Santa Coloma, returning to Spain in July 2024 with amateurs CE Manresa.
