= Mariano Konyk =

Argentine footballer

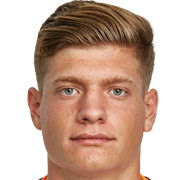

Personal information
- Full name: Mariano Konyk Goba
- Date of birth: 15 February 1998 (age 28)
- Place of birth: Buenos Aires, Argentina
- Height: 1.80 m (5 ft 11 in)
- Position: Centre back

Youth career
- Catalònia
- Gramenet
- 2008–2013: Espanyol
- 2013–2017: Valencia

Senior career*
Years	Team	Apps	(Gls)
2017–2019	Sevilla B	16	(0)
2019	→ Sabadell (loan)	5	(0)
2019–2020	Osasuna B	10	(0)
Total		31	(0)
- * Club domestic league appearances and goals

Mariano Konyk Goba (born 15 February 1998) is an Argentine former footballer who played as a central defender.

== Club career ==
Born in Buenos Aires, Konyk moved to Barcelona at the age of five and represented UB Catalònia, UDA Gramenet, RCD Espanyol and Valencia CF as a youth. On 10 May 2017, as his deal with the Che was due to expire, he agreed to a contract with FC Barcelona.

On 26 July 2017, after being told that he would be loaned out, Konyk opted to terminate his contract with the Catalans. Strongly linked to Real Madrid's reserves, he signed a three-year deal with Sevilla FC on the same day, being initially assigned to the B-side in Segunda División.

Konyk made his professional debut on 19 August 2017, starting in a 1–1 away draw against CA Osasuna. On 31 January 2019, he was loaned to Segunda División B side CE Sabadell FC.

On 1 August 2019, Konyk agreed to a two-year contract with another reserve team, CA Osasuna B in the third division. On 29 September 2020, after struggling severely with injuries in the past seasons, he terminated his contract with the club and retired from professional football at the age of just 22.

== Personal life ==
Born in Argentina, Konyk is of Ukrainian descent.
