= Yanis Youcef =

French footballer (born 1989)

Personal information
- Full name: Yanis Djaballah Youcef
- Date of birth: 2 October 1989 (age 37)
- Place of birth: Istres, France
- Height: 1.77 m (5 ft 10 in)
- Position: Midfielder

Youth career
- Istres Rassuen
- Martigues
- 2005–2007: Gueugnon
- 2007–2008: Monaco

Senior career*
Years	Team	Apps	(Gls)
2008–2009	Pobla Mafumet	25	(1)
2009–2010	Gimnàstic	0	(0)
2010–2011	USM Blida	8	(0)
2011	MC Alger	4	(0)
2012	USM El Harrach	3	(0)
2013	Chernomorets Burgas	6	(0)
2013–2014	Marignane	13	(0)
2014–2016	FC Martigues	35	(0)
2016–2017	FC Côte Bleue	14	(0)
2017–?	ES Fosséenne		
- * Club domestic league appearances and goals

Yanis Youcef (born 2 October 1989) is a French former professional footballer who played as a midfielder.

== Career ==
As a youth player Youcef played in France for Istres Rassuen, Martigues, Gueugnon and Monaco.

In June 2017 he moved amateur club ES Fosséenne, playing in Regional 2, the seventh tier of the French football league system.

== Personal life ==
Youcef holds Algerian nationality.
