= David Medina (footballer) =

Spanish footballer

Personal information
- Full name: David Medina Díaz de López
- Date of birth: 25 July 1982 (age 44)
- Place of birth: Barcelona, Spain
- Height: 1.75 m (5 ft 9 in)
- Position: Midfielder

Senior career*
Years	Team	Apps	(Gls)
2001–2003	Premià		
2003–2011	Gimnàstic	160	(0)
2005–2006	→ Sabadell (loan)	30	(2)
2006–2007	→ Racing Ferrol (loan)	31	(0)
2011–2013	Tenerife	53	(0)
2013–2014	Reus	12	(0)
2014–2015	Sestao	34	(2)
2015	Hospitalet	13	(0)
2016–2018	Amposta		
- * Club domestic league appearances and goals

David Medina Díaz de López (born 25 July 1982) is a Spanish former professional footballer who played as a defensive midfielder. He is most notable for playing for Gimnàstic in the Spanish Segunda División.
