= Borja Viguera =

Spanish footballer (born 1987)

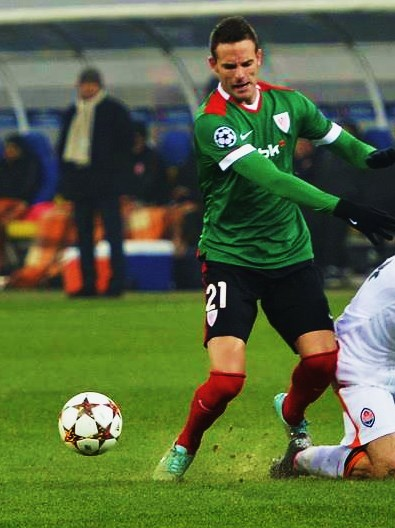
- Viguera with Athletic Bilbao in 2014

Personal information
- Full name: Borja Viguera Manzanares
- Date of birth: 26 March 1987 (age 39)
- Place of birth: Logroño, Spain
- Height: 1.83 m (6 ft 0 in)
- Position: Striker

Youth career
- Berceo
- 2003–2006: Real Sociedad

Senior career*
| Years | Team | Apps | (Gls) |
| 2006–2009 | Real Sociedad B | 91 | (25) |
| 2007–2012 | Real Sociedad | 14 | (0) |
| 2011–2012 | → Gimnàstic (loan) | 15 | (2) |
| 2012 | → Albacete (loan) | 9 | (1) |
| 2012–2014 | Alavés | 75 | (38) |
| 2014–2016 | Athletic Bilbao | 30 | (2) |
| 2016–2018 | Sporting Gijón | 27 | (1) |
| 2018–2019 | Numancia | 23 | (1) |
| 2020–2021 | Real Unión | 31 | (4) |
| 2021–2022 | Intercity | 27 | (1) |
| Total | | 342 | (75) |
- * Club domestic league appearances and goals

Borja Viguera Manzanares (born 26 March 1987) is a Spanish former professional footballer who played as a striker.

He achieved totals of 51 games and three goals in La Liga for Real Sociedad, Athletic Bilbao and Sporting de Gijón. He also made 100 Segunda División appearances and scored 28 goals for five clubs, finishing as top scorer for the 2013–14 season for Alavés.

== Career ==
=== Real Sociedad ===
Born in Logroño, La Rioja, Viguera graduated from Real Sociedad's prolific youth setup, and made his senior debut with the reserves in 2006–07, in the Segunda División B. He played his first match as a professional on 15 September 2007, coming on as a substitute for Iñigo Díaz de Cerio in a 3–2 Segunda División away win against UD Las Palmas. He made a further four appearances with the main squad during the following season, as they missed out on promotion by finishing fourth.

Viguera was promoted officially to Real's first team in June 2009, but featured rarely as the Basques were crowned champions. On 11 January 2011, he joined Gimnàstic de Tarragona on loan until June, suffering a knee injury the following month that ruled him out for the remainder of the campaign.

On 26 August 2011, Viguera returned to Nàstic again in a temporary deal. After being sparingly used by the Catalans he returned to Real Sociedad on 31 January 2012, and was subsequently loaned to Albacete Balompié of the third tier.

=== Alavés ===
On 6 July 2012, having been offered a new contract with Real Sociedad but facing another loan to one of their partner clubs in Gipuzkoa, Viguera instead joined neighbouring Deportivo Alavés, also in the third division. He was ever-present in his first year, scoring 21 goals in all competitions to help his team to achieve promotion to the second tier in the play-offs.

Viguera extended his contract with the Vitoria-Gasteiz club on 14 August 2013, until 2015. He netted 25 times during the season, as the side narrowly avoided relegation; highlights included a hat-trick at CE Sabadell FC on 8 February 2014 in a 4–0 victory.

=== Athletic Bilbao ===
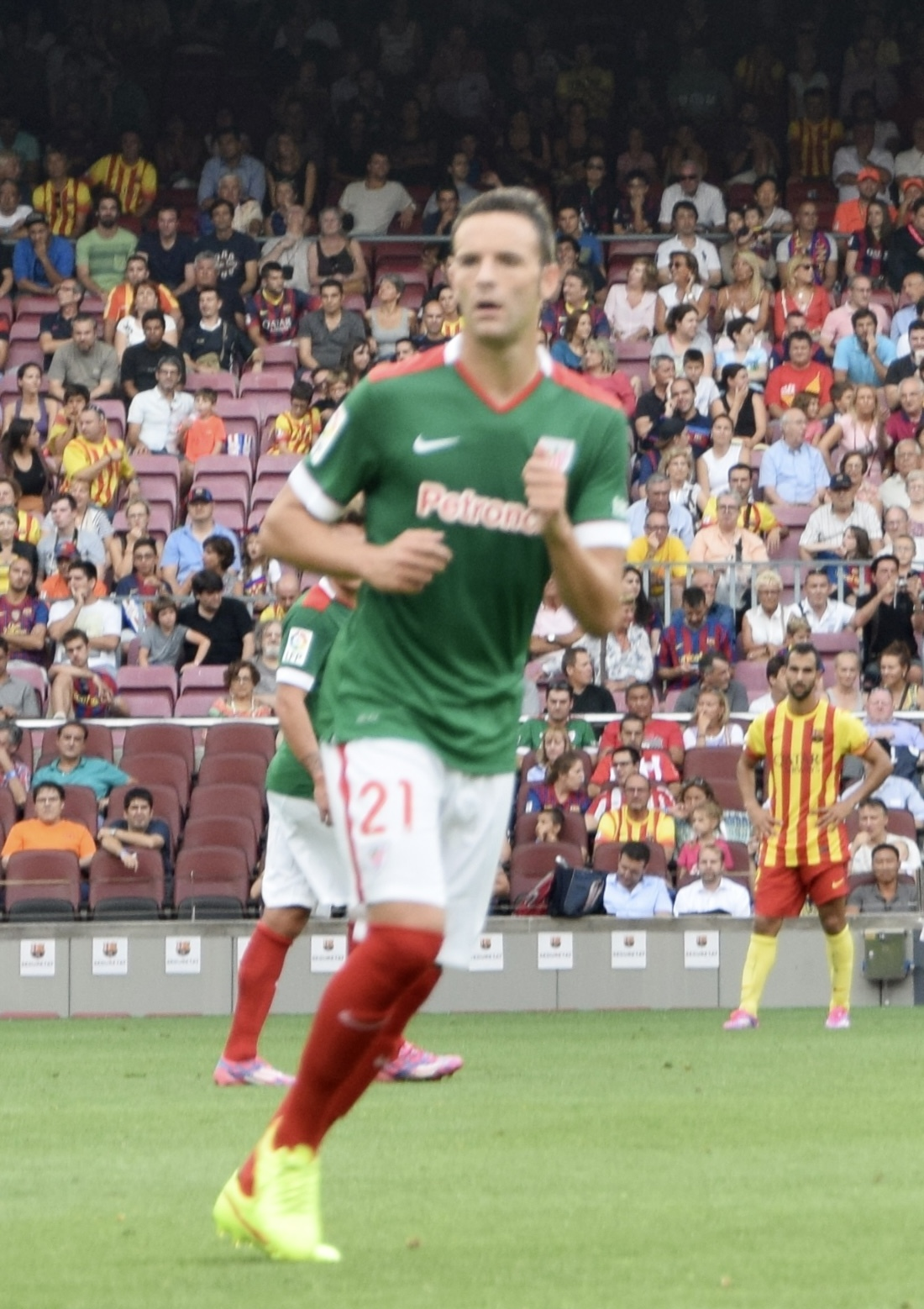
Viguera playing for Athletic in 2014

On 13 June 2014, Viguera signed a three-year deal with Athletic Bilbao for €1 million. Though not born in the Basque Country, learning his footballing skills at Real Sociedad meant he was considered eligible to play for Athletic under their signing policy. Mainly a backup option for Aritz Aduriz and the emrging Iñaki Williams during his time there, he scored his first La Liga goal for his new team on 21 November, the second of a 3–1 home win over RCD Espanyol, and made ten European appearances in two campaigns, though was not selected for the squads for the 2015 Copa del Rey final or either leg of the 2015 Supercopa de España.

=== Sporting Gijón ===
Viguera agreed to a two-year contract at Sporting de Gijón on 30 August 2016 (he had scored Athletic's consolation goal in a 2–1 loss against Sporting at El Molinón a week earlier). He scored just once in the league during his first season, which ended in relegation from La Liga, and featured even less in the following campaign.

=== Numancia ===
On 1 August 2018, free agent Viguera signed a two-year contract with CD Numancia. He played 24 total games (five starts) and scored once, a late penalty that was the only goal of the game at home to Real Zaragoza on 13 October. Viguera cut ties with the club on 4 September 2019.

=== Later career ===
Viguera joined third-tier Real Unión on 22 January 2020. On 31 August the following year, he moved to CF Intercity in the new Segunda División RFEF. He was used mainly off the bench for the eventually promoted team from Sant Joan d'Alacant, including on 9 January 2022 when he scored his only goal to earn a 1–1 home draw against CF La Nucía.

In a September 2023 interview, he stated that he had hung up his boots 'two years ago', and had since undertaken training courses to become a sporting director and taken on a role at Zubieta, Real Sociedad's training centre and youth academy.

== Personal life ==
His father Santiago Viguera was also a footballer and a forward who developed in the 1970s at Real Sociedad, where he played over 100 times for the reserves in the fourth tier but progressed no further, then made a further century of appearances for hometown side CD Logroñés in the third level.

== Career statistics ==
As of match played 16 May 2021

Appearances and goals by club, season and competition
| Club | Season | League | | | National cup | | Continental | | Other | | Total | |
| Club | Season | Division | Apps | Goals | Apps | Goals | Apps | Goals | Apps | Goals | Apps | Goals |
|---|---|---|---|---|---|---|---|---|---|---|---|---|
| Real Sociedad B | 2006–07 | Segunda División B | 38 | 10 | — | | — | | — | | 38 | 10 |
| Real Sociedad B | 2007–08 | Segunda División B | 31 | 9 | — | | — | | — | | 31 | 9 |
| Real Sociedad B | 2008–09 | Segunda División B | 22 | 6 | — | | — | | — | | 22 | 6 |
| Real Sociedad B | Total | | 91 | 25 | 0 | 0 | 0 | 0 | 0 | 0 | 91 | 25 |
| Real Sociedad | 2007–08 | Segunda División | 3 | 0 | 0 | 0 | — | | — | | 3 | 0 |
| Real Sociedad | 2008–09 | Segunda División | 2 | 0 | 0 | 0 | — | | — | | 2 | 0 |
| Real Sociedad | 2009–10 | Segunda División | 4 | 0 | 0 | 0 | — | | — | | 4 | 0 |
| Real Sociedad | 2010–11 | La Liga | 5 | 0 | 2 | 0 | — | | — | | 7 | 0 |
| Real Sociedad | Total | | 14 | 0 | 2 | 0 | 0 | 0 | 0 | 0 | 16 | 0 |
| Gimnàstic (loan) | 2010–11 | Segunda División | 5 | 2 | 0 | 0 | — | | — | | 5 | 2 |
| Gimnàstic (loan) | 2011–12 | Segunda División | 10 | 0 | 1 | 0 | — | | — | | 11 | 0 |
| Gimnàstic (loan) | Total | | 15 | 2 | 1 | 0 | 0 | 0 | 0 | 0 | 16 | 2 |
| Albacete (loan) | 2011–12 | Segunda División B | 9 | 1 | 0 | 0 | — | | 1 (Note: Appearances in Segunda División B play-offs) | 0 | 10 | 1 |
| Alavés | 2012–13 | Segunda División B | 33 | 13 | 5 | 3 | — | | 4 | 5 | 42 | 21 |
| Alavés | 2013–14 | Segunda División | 42 | 25 | 2 | 1 | — | | — | | 44 | 26 |
| Alavés | Total | | 75 | 38 | 7 | 4 | 0 | 0 | 4 | 5 | 86 | 47 |
| Athletic Bilbao | 2014–15 | La Liga | 20 | 1 | 4 | 2 | 4 (Note: Three appearances in UEFA Champions League, one appearance in UEFA Europa League) | 0 | — | | 28 | 3 |
| Athletic Bilbao | 2015–16 | La Liga | 9 | 0 | 1 | 0 | 6 (Note: Appearances in UEFA Europa League) | 0 | — | | 16 | 0 |
| Athletic Bilbao | 2016–17 | La Liga | 1 | 1 | 0 | 0 | — | | — | | 1 | 1 |
| Athletic Bilbao | Total | | 30 | 2 | 5 | 2 | 10 | 0 | 0 | 0 | 45 | 4 |
| Sporting Gijón | 2016–17 | La Liga | 16 | 1 | 2 | 1 | — | | — | | 18 | 2 |
| Sporting Gijón | 2017–18 | Segunda División | 11 | 0 | 1 | 0 | — | | — | | 12 | 0 |
| Sporting Gijón | Total | | 27 | 1 | 3 | 1 | 0 | 0 | 0 | 0 | 30 | 2 |
| Numancia | 2018–19 | Segunda División | 23 | 1 | 1 | 0 | — | | — | | 24 | 1 |
| Numancia | 2019–20 | Segunda División | 0 | 0 | 0 | 0 | — | | — | | 0 | 0 |
| Numancia | Total | | 23 | 1 | 1 | 0 | 0 | 0 | 0 | 0 | 24 | 1 |
| Real Unión | 2019–20 | Segunda División B | 7 | 0 | 0 | 0 | — | | — | | 7 | 0 |
| Real Unión | 2020–21 | Segunda División B | 24 | 4 | 0 | 0 | — | | — | | 24 | 4 |
| Real Unión | Total | | 31 | 4 | 0 | 0 | 0 | 0 | 0 | 0 | 31 | 4 |
| Career total | | | 315 | 74 | 19 | 7 | 10 | 0 | 5 | 5 | 349 | 86 |

== Honours ==
Real Sociedad

- Segunda División: 2009–10

Alavés

- Segunda División B: 2012–13

Individual

- Segunda División top scorer: 2013–14
- Segunda División Player of the Month: November 2013
