= José Moragón =

Spanish footballer

Personal information
- Full name: José Sánchez Moragón
- Date of birth: 6 October 1987 (age 39)
- Place of birth: Manacor, Spain
- Height: 1.83 m (6 ft 0 in)
- Position: Goalkeeper

Youth career
- Manacor
- 2005–2006: Betis

Senior career*
Years	Team	Apps	(Gls)
2006–2007	Reus	0	(0)
2007–2008	Morell		
2008–2010	Reus	60	(0)
2010–2011	Gimnàstic	1	(0)
2011–2012	Hospitalet	2	(0)
2012–2017	Llagostera	114	(0)
- * Club domestic league appearances and goals as of 14 May 2017

José Sánchez Moragón (born 6 October 1987 in Manacor, Balearic Islands) is a Spanish former footballer who played as a goalkeeper.
