= Sergio Díaz (footballer, born 1985) =

Spanish footballer

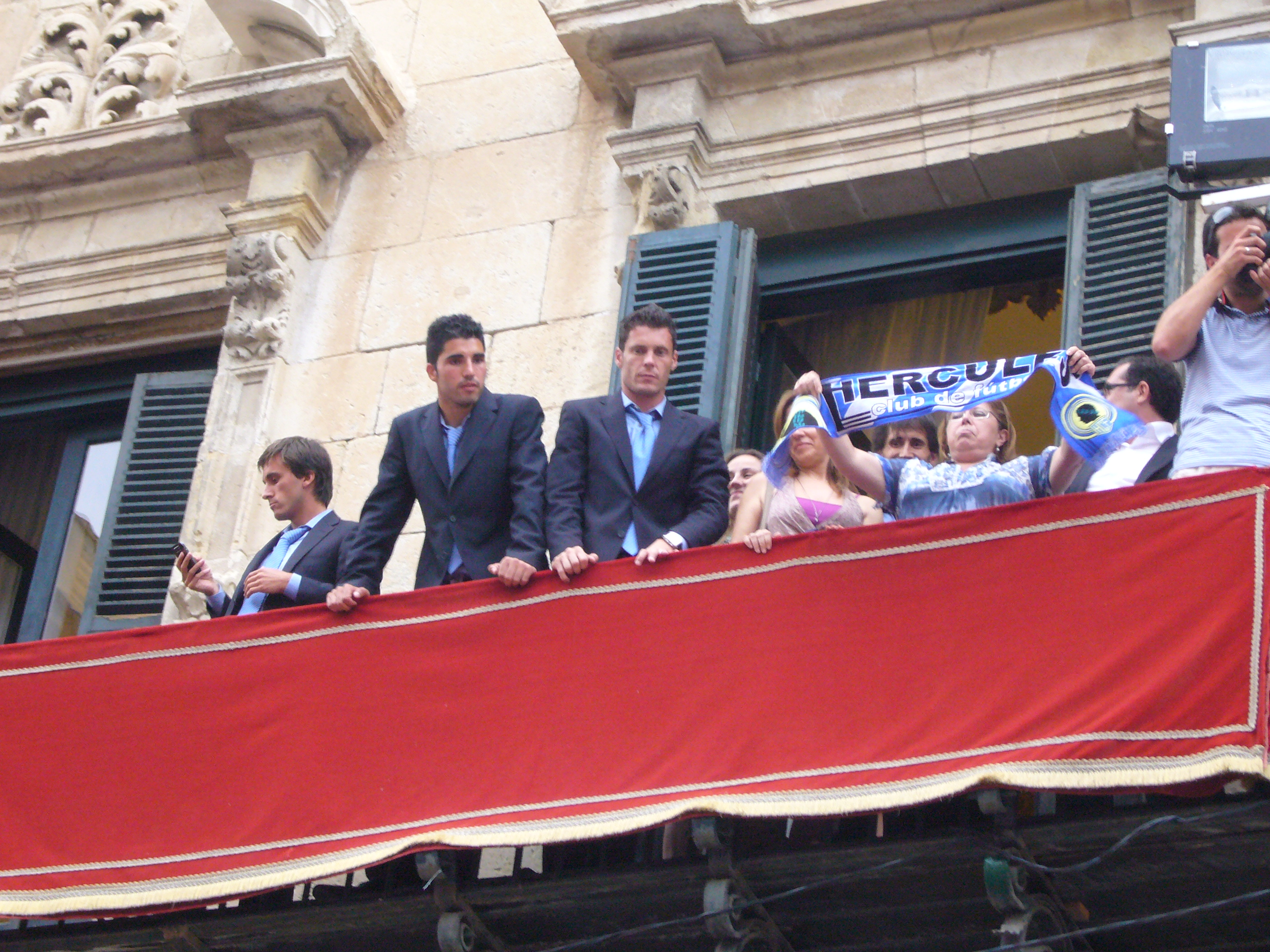
- Díaz (second from left) celebrates promotion to La Liga with Hércules in 2010

Personal information
- Full name: Sergio Alejandro Díaz
- Date of birth: 9 February 1985 (age 41)
- Place of birth: Turón, Spain
- Height: 1.94 m (6 ft 4 in)
- Position: Centre-back

Youth career
- Oviedo

Senior career*
Years	Team	Apps	(Gls)
2002–2003	Oviedo B		
2002–2003	Oviedo	15	(2)
2003–2008	Real Madrid B	56	(2)
2008–2010	Hércules	12	(0)
2010–2011	Gimnàstic	21	(0)
2011–2013	Hércules	10	(0)
2013–2014	Avilés	0	(0)
Total		114	(4)

International career
2003	Spain U17	4	(0)
2003	Spain U19	2	(0)
2003	Spain U20	2	(0)
- * Club domestic league appearances and goals

Sergio Alejandro Díaz (born 9 February 1985) is a Spanish retired footballer who played as a central defender.

== Club career ==
Díaz was born in Turón, Asturias. After starting out at local Real Oviedo, making his senior debut aged 17 in the Segunda División in a relegation-ending season, he finished his football development at Real Madrid, having joined in 2003.

Over two seasons in the second division – of the five in total he spent with the team– Díaz made a further seven league appearances with the reserves. He was also called up to the first team for a UEFA Champions League match against FC Dynamo Kyiv in December 2006 (the group stage's last), but remained an unused substitute; he earned another call that month, in La Liga against Sevilla FC, although he ultimately was cut from the final squad of 18.

For the 2008–09 campaign, Díaz signed with Hércules CF, who was coached by his former Castilla manager Juan Carlos Mandiá. He appeared very rarely for the fourth-placed team in division two, following a severe injury contracted in preseason.

Díaz moved to Gimnàstic de Tarragona in 2010–11, agreeing to a three-year deal with the second tier side. On 29 July 2011, however, he terminated his contract with the Catalans, and returned to old club Hércules the same day.

== Honours ==
Spain U17

- Meridian Cup: 2003
