= Joaquín Sorribas =

Spanish footballer

Personal information
- Full name: Joaquín Sorribas Ariño
- Date of birth: 27 June 1978 (age 48)
- Place of birth: Huesca, Spain
- Height: 1.79 m (5 ft 10 in)
- Position: Defensive midfielder

Youth career
- 1994–1996: Huesca
- 1995–1996: → Teruel (loan)

Senior career*
Years	Team	Apps	(Gls)
1996–1997	Huesca	29	(0)
1997–1998	Valencia B	4	(0)
1998–1999	Binéfar	34	(1)
1999–2002	Zaragoza B	92	(1)
2002–2004	Almería	48	(0)
2004–2005	Ceuta	19	(1)
2005	Real Unión	13	(0)
2005–2006	Burgos	31	(0)
2006–2013	Huesca	149	(1)
2013–2015	Toledo	48	(0)
Total		467	(4)
- * Club domestic league appearances and goals

Joaquín Sorribas Ariño (born 27 June 1978 in Huesca, Aragon) is a Spanish former professional footballer who played as a defensive midfielder.
