= Miki (footballer, born 1984) =

Spanish footballer

Personal information
- Full name: Miquel Martínez Moya
- Date of birth: 28 June 1984 (age 42)
- Place of birth: Berga, Spain
- Height: 1.77 m (5 ft 9 1/2 in)
- Position: Midfielder

Youth career
- Espanyol

Senior career*
Years	Team	Apps	(Gls)
2001–2006	Espanyol B	156	(19)
2006	Espanyol	2	(0)
2006–2007	Getafe	0	(0)
2006–2007	→ Jaén (loan)	29	(2)
2007–2008	Sabadell	37	(3)
2008–2010	Lleida	72	(6)
2010–2011	Gimnàstic	16	(1)
2011–2012	Alcoyano	28	(1)
2012–2013	Alavés	21	(1)
2013–2014	Olot	11	(0)
2014–2015	Castellón	11	(0)
2015–2016	Terrassa	15	(1)

International career
2005	Spain U23	3	(0)
- * Club domestic league appearances and goals as of 17 September 2017

Miquel Martínez Moya (born 28 June 1984), commonly known as Miki, is a Spanish former footballer who played as a midfielder.

== Football career ==
Born in Berga, Barcelona, Catalonia, brought up in the local RCD Espanyol youth ranks, Miki spent the bulk of his years in the reserves. In two consecutive matchdays in the 2005–06 season, he managed two substitute appearances for the first team: at Villarreal CF (0–4 loss) and at home against Sevilla FC (5–0 win).

In the summer of 2006, Miki was released and joined another club in La Liga, Getafe CF, but was immediately loaned to the Real Jaén and never appeared again for the former side. Released, he resumed his career in the third division with the CE Sabadell FC and the UE Lleida.

Still in his province of birth, in 2010–11 Miki signed with the Gimnàstic de Tarragona in the second tier. His last experience at the professional level came during the following campaign at the age of 27, eventually being relegated to the CD Alcoyano.

== Honours ==
=== International ===
Spain U23

- Mediterranean Games: 2005
