= Aythami Álvarez =

Spanish footballer (born 1988)

Aythami
Personal information
- Full name: Aythami Jesús Álvarez González
- Date of birth: 27 August 1988 (age 38)
- Place of birth: Las Palmas, Spain
- Height: 1.78 m (5 ft 10 in)
- Position: Right-back

Youth career
- Las Palmas

Senior career*
| Years | Team | Apps | (Gls) |
| 2008–2010 | Las Palmas B | 56 | (6) |
| 2010–2014 | Las Palmas | 38 | (1) |
| 2014–2016 | Huesca | 46 | (0) |
| 2016–2017 | Barakaldo | 35 | (6) |
| 2017–2024 | Tamaraceite | 148 | (6) |
| 2024–2025 | Villa Santa Brígida | 2 | (1) |
- * Club domestic league appearances and goals as of 15 September 2024

Aythami Jesús Álvarez González (born 27 August 1988), known simply as Aythami, is a Spanish professional footballer who plays as a right-back.
