= Álex Cruz (footballer, born 1990) =

Spanish association football player

Personal information
- Full name: Alejandro Cruz Rodríguez
- Date of birth: 17 June 1990 (age 36)
- Place of birth: Mogán, Spain
- Height: 1.76 m (5 ft 9 in)
- Position: Midfielder

Youth career
- Vecindario

Senior career*
Years	Team	Apps	(Gls)
2008–2009	Vecindario	33	(6)
2009–2011	Gimnàstic	43	(3)
2011–2013	Granada	7	(0)
2011–2012	→ Sabadell (loan)	12	(0)
2012–2013	→ UCAM Murcia (loan)	29	(4)
2013–2014	Llagostera	28	(3)
2014–2015	Burgos	26	(2)
2015–2016	Jaén	32	(2)
2016–2017	Mensajero	34	(3)
2017–2018	Ebro	18	(1)
2018	Lealtad	13	(2)
2018–2019	Doxa Drama	17	(3)
2019–2021	Niki Volos		
2021–2023	San Fernando	43	(4)
2023	Mensajero	12	(2)
- * Club domestic league appearances and goals as of 15:25, 9 October 2024 (UTC)

Alejandro 'Álex' Cruz Rodríguez (born 17 June 1990) is a Spanish footballer who plays as a midfielder.

== Club career ==
Born in Mogán, Las Palmas, Canary Islands, Cruz made his senior debut in 2008 with local club UD Vecindario in the Segunda División B. After good performances, he signed a four-year contract with Gimnàstic de Tarragona from Segunda División.

In his first season with the Catalans, Cruz was fairly used as they finished in 18th position with 51 points, but just one place before the relegation zone. His first match in the competition took place on 30 August 2009 when he came on as a late substitute in a 1–0 away win against Real Murcia CF, and his maiden goal occurred the following 17 January in the 2–2 draw at Elche CF.

Cruz agreed to a three-and-a-half-year deal with Granada CF in January 2011. He achieved promotion to the second tier, but totalled only 121 minutes in the process.

In July 2011, Cruz was loaned to CE Sabadell FC, recently promoted to division two. The following summer, after scarcely featuring throughout the campaign, he joined UCAM Murcia CF also on loan.

On 2 September 2013, Cruz signed for UE Llagostera after being released by Granada. He was released in June of the following year, and moved to Burgos CF also in the third tier on 8 August.

Cruz continued competing in the third division the following years, representing Real Jaén, CD Mensajero, CD Ebro and CD Lealtad.
