= Juan Domínguez (footballer, born 1983) =

Spanish footballer

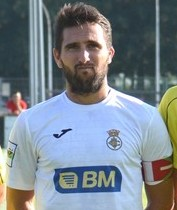
- Domínguez in 2017

Personal information
- Full name: Juan Domínguez Otaegui
- Date of birth: 29 December 1983 (age 42)
- Place of birth: San Sebastián, Spain
- Height: 1.75 m (5 ft 9 in)
- Position: Forward

Team information
- Current team: Real Sociedad (youth)

Youth career
- Real Sociedad

Senior career*
Years	Team	Apps	(Gls)
2003–2005	Real Sociedad B	63	(17)
2005–2007	Real Sociedad	2	(0)
2005–2006	→ Eibar (loan)	17	(1)
2006–2007	→ Real Unión (loan)	36	(7)
2007–2008	Lleida	29	(2)
2008–2010	Real Unión	78	(12)
2010–2012	Gimnàstic	11	(0)
2011	→ Eibar (loan)	12	(0)
2012	Guijuelo	12	(0)
2012–2018	Real Unión	183	(26)
Total		443	(65)

Managerial career
- 2018–2019: Real Unión
- 2019–: Real Sociedad (youth)
- * Club domestic league appearances and goals

Juan Domínguez Otaegui (born 29 December 1983) is a Spanish former footballer who played as a forward, currently a manager.

== Playing career ==
Domínguez was born in San Sebastián, Gipuzkoa. Formed in Real Sociedad's youth system, he made his senior debut with the B team in Segunda División B. On 2 March 2005 he played his first La Liga game, coming on as a substitute for Óscar de Paula in the 87th minute of a 2–1 home win against Real Zaragoza.

Domínguez spent the following two seasons on loan, with SD Eibar (Segunda División) and Real Unión (third tier), both in the Basque Country. In the summer of 2007, his contract expired and the free agent signed with UE Lleida in division three, only managing to score twice during the campaign.

Domínguez returned to Unión for 2008–09, helping the Irun club return to the second division after 44 years but being immediately relegated. On 30 June 2010 he signed with another side in that league, Gimnàstic de Tarragona. However, he failed to impress during his tenure, and in January was loaned to former team Eibar until the end of the season.

In late January 2012, Domínguez was released by Nàstic. On 4 February, he signed a contract with third-tier CD Guijuelo.

== Coaching career ==
Domínguez returned to Real Unión for a third spell on 4 July 2012, going on to see out his career with the club in the third division and being immediately appointed its manager on 19 May 2018.

In the summer of 2019, Domínguez signed as youth coach of Real Sociedad.

== Managerial statistics ==
As of 17 March 2019

Managerial record by team and tenure
Team	Nat	From	To	Record								Ref
Team	Nat	From	To	G	W	D	L	GF	GA	GD	Win %	Ref
Real Unión	(Spain)	19 May 2018	18 March 2019	29	5	16	8	30	36	−6	17.24	
Career total				29	5	16	8	30	36	−6	17.24	—
