= 2010–11 Hércules CF season =

Hércules
2010–11 season
- President: Valentín Botella
- Manager: Esteban Vigo
- La Liga: 19th
- Copa del Rey: Round of 32
- Top goalscorer: League: Nelson Valdez (8); All: Nelson Valdez (8)
Home colours	Away colours

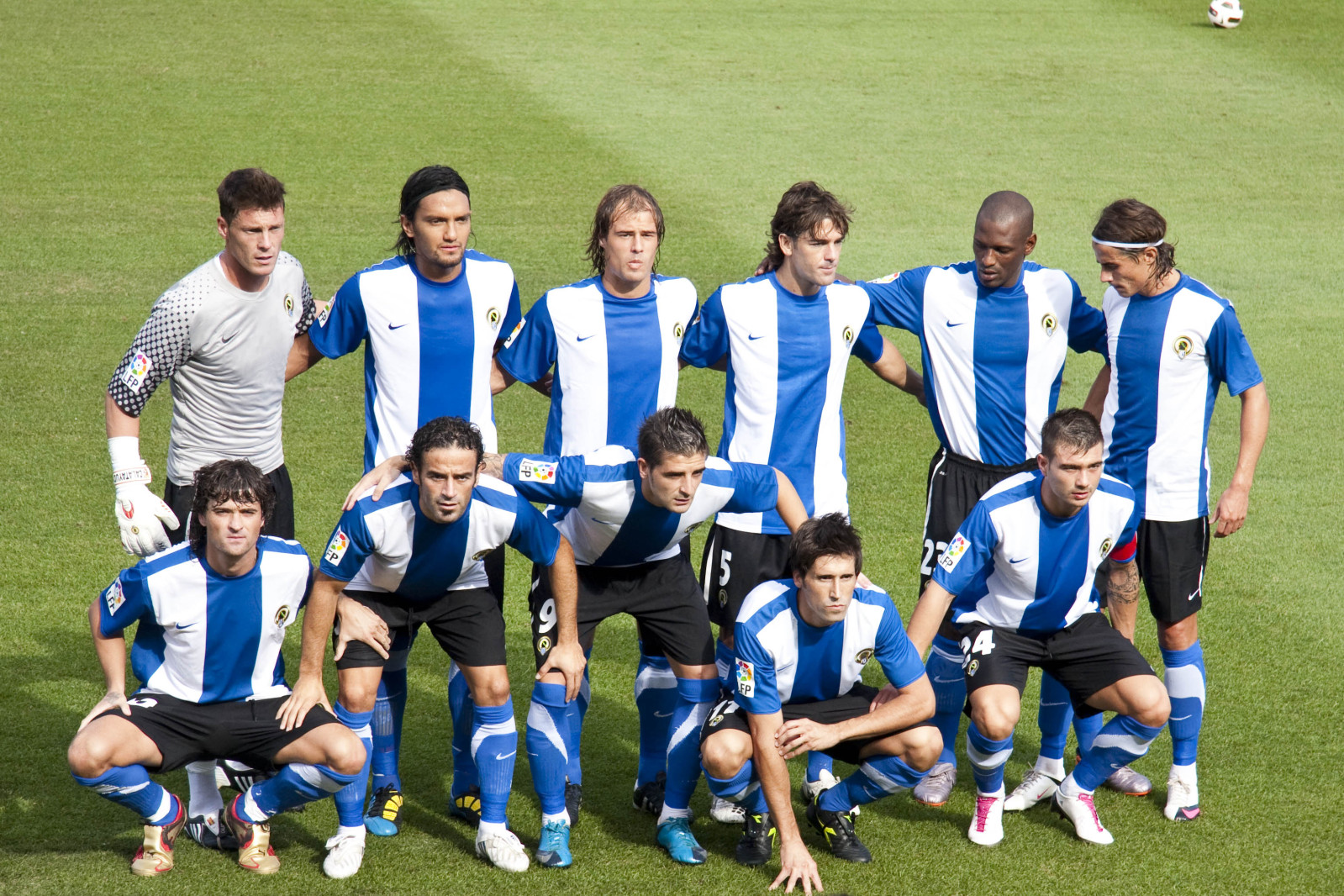
First league starting lineup 2010–11.

The 2010–11 Hércules CF season is the club's 88th in existence and his first season after 13 years without playing in the top flight of Spanish football, La Liga. In the existing Hércules season returns to Primera trained by Esteban and paying transfers by Nelson Valdez (€4M), Abel Aguilar (€1.5M) or Piet Velthuizen (€0.8M), all cornered by signing star David Trezeguet and transfer of Royston Drenthe.

== Team kit ==
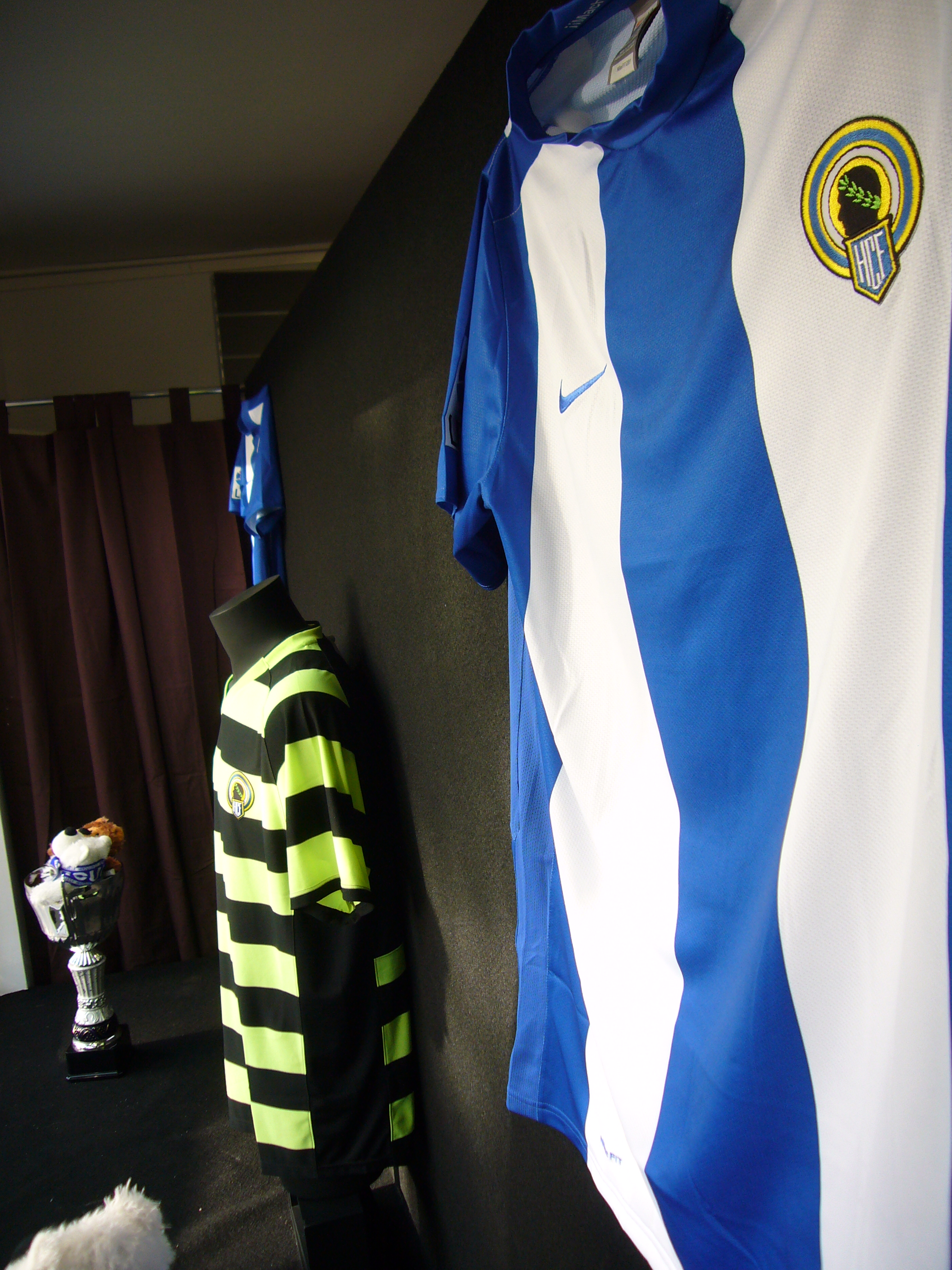
T-shirts for the 2010–11 season on the official club shop.

The team kits for the 2010–11 season are produced by Nike, first in its history. For the first time since 1983, the Hércules will not have a sponsor on their shirts. Only in a friendly match against Real Madrid, the Hércules wore the sponsor Cívica. On 29 July 2010, the new shirts were officially presented. The first kit, maintains its traditional colors of blue and white vertical stripes with historic characterized by its thickness. The black color of his pants is the same as in its 88-year history. The socks are blue with some white details. New for this season, is the second kit, which for the first time in his life, will have horizontal stripes on his shirt. Pants and socks are still black for the second kit. The socks and pants will be white, so that these items are not confused with those of a rival team.

== Players ==
=== Squad information ===
N	Pos.	Nat.	Name	Age	EU	Since	App	Goals	Ends	Transfer fee	Notes
1	GK	(Spain)	Calatayud (VC)	31	EU	2008	85	0	2011	Free	
2	RB	(Romania)	Pulhac	26	EU	2010	0	0	2011	€250,000 (Loan)	
3	LB	(Spain)	Juanra	31	EU	2009	41	0	2012	Free	
4	CB	(Senegal)	Momo Sarr	27	EU	2010	0	0	2013	€300,000	Second nationality: Belgium
5	CB	(Spain)	Abraham Paz	31	EU	2008	68	6	2011	Free	
6	AM	(Spain)	Cristian Hidalgo	27	EU	2009	28	5	2012	€200,000	
7	RM	(Spain)	Rufete (captain)	34	EU	2009	32	0	2012	Free	
8	DM	(Spain)	Farinós	33	EU	2006	141	21	2012	Free	
9	CF	(Spain)	Portillo	29	EU	2009	19	5	2012	Free	
10	AM	(Spain)	Tote	32	EU	2006	146	28	2011	Free	
11	LW	(Spain)	Sendoa	35	EU	2006	160	27	2012	Free	
12	LW	(Netherlands)	Drenthe	24	EU	2010	1	0	2011	Loan	Second nationality: Suriname
13	GK	(Spain)	Unai Alba	33	EU	2007	48	0	2011	Free	
14	CM	(Colombia)	Abel Aguilar	26	Non-EU	2010	38	9	2014	€1,500,000	
15	RW	(Spain)	Kiko Femenía	20	EU	2008	44	3	2014	Youth system	
16	RB	(Spain)	Paco Peña (VC)	32	EU	2009	34	0	2012	Free	
17	CF	(France)	Trezeguet	33	EU	2010	1	0	2012	Free	Second nationality: Argentina
18	DM	(Argentina)	Fritzler	24	EU	2010	2	0	2011	€160,000 (Loan)	Second nationality: Germany
19	CB	(Spain)	Rodri	26	EU	2009	40	4	2011	Free	
20	AM	(Paraguay)	Nelson Valdez	27	Non-EU	2010	1	0	2013	€4,000,000	
21	LB	(Spain)	David Cortés	31	EU	2010	2	0	2011	Free	
22	LW	(France)	Thomert	31	EU	2010	1	0	2011	Free	Second nationality: Martinique
23	CB	(France)	Pamarot	32	EU	2009	14	0	2012	Free	
24	CM	(Portugal)	Tiago Gomes	25	EU	2009	43	7	2012	€400,000	
25	GK	(Netherlands)	Velthuizen	24	EU	2010	0	0	2014	€800,000	

- Last updated: 1 September
- Source: herculescf.es, Players in / out, Wikipedia players' articles, Guía Marca de la Liga 2011 (ISSN 1575-4707) (for appearances and goals), ESPN (for appearances and goals) and La Verdad newspaper (for captains).
- Ordered by number.

Total squad cost: €7,610,000

=== From youth system ===
As of 1 September. Note: Flags indicate national team as defined under FIFA eligibility rules; some limited exceptions apply. Players may hold more than one non-FIFA nationality.

No.	Pos.	Nation	Player
28	FW	VEN	Jesús Pastor
29	DF	ESP	Adrián

No.	Pos.	Nation	Player
31	MF	ESP	Vicente

=== Players in / out ===
==== In ====
No.	Pos.	Nat.	Name	Age	EU	Moving from	Type	Transfer window	Ends	Transfer fee	Source
22	LW	(France)	Olivier Thomert	30	EU	Le Mans (France)	Transfer	Summer	2011	Free	diarioinformacion.com
18	DM	(Argentina)	Matías Fritzler	23	Non-EU	Lanús (Argentina)	Loan	Summer	2011	€160,000	laverdad.es
14	CM	(Colombia)	Abel Aguilar	25	Non-EU	Udinese (Italy)	Transfer	Summer	2014	€150,000	as.com
21	LB	(Spain)	David Cortés	30	EU	Getafe	Transfer	Summer	2011	Free	marca.com
2	RB	(Romania)	Cristian Pulhac	25	EU	Dinamo București (Romania)	Loan	Summer	2011	€250,000	dinamovisti.gsp.ro
20	AM	(Paraguay)	Nelson Valdez	26	Non-EU	Borussia Dortmund (Germany)	Transfer	Summer	2013	€4,000,000	marca.com
4	CB	(Senegal)	Mohamed Sarr	26	EU	Standard Liège (Belgium)	Transfer	Summer	2013	€300,000	alicanteactualidad.es
25	GK	(Netherlands)	Piet Velthuizen	23	EU	Vitesse (Netherlands)	Transfer	Summer	2014	€800,000	voetbalprimeur.nl
17	CF	(France)	David Trezeguet	32	EU	Juventus (Italy)	Transfer	Summer	2012	Free	herculescf.es
12	LW	(Netherlands)	Royston Drenthe	23	EU	Real Madrid	Loan	Summer	2011	Free	herculescf.es

Last updated: 31 August

Total spending: ▼€7,010,000

==== Out ====
No.	Pos.	Nat.	Name	Age	EU	Moving to	Type	Transfer window	Transfer fee	Source
18	LB	(Spain)	Edu Moya	29	EU	Xerez	Contract termination	Summer	Free	as.com
20	CB	(Spain)	Sergio Díaz	25	EU	Gimnàstic	Contract termination	Summer	Free	as.com
22	MF	(Spain)	Gerardo Noriega	28	EU	Gimnàstic	Contract termination	Summer	Free	sport.es
23	FW	(Montenegro)	Andrija Delibašić	29	Non-EU	Rayo Vallecano	Contract termination	Summer	Free	as.com
25	SS	(Romania)	Ionel Dănciulescu	33	EU	Dinamo București (Romania)	Contract cancellation	Summer	Free	fcdinamo.ro
14	CM	(Spain)	Jorge Alonso	25	EU	Valladolid	Contract cancellation	Summer	Free	marca.com
4	MF	(Spain)	Rodri Gimeno	30	EU	Gimnàstic	Contract cancellation	Summer	Free	lasprovincias.es
21	RB	(Spain)	Dani Bautista	29	EU	Girona	Contract cancellation	Summer	Free	laverdad.es
2	LB	(Spain)	Manuel Ruz	24	EU	Gimnàstic	Contract cancellation	Summer	Free	gimnasticdetarragona.com
17	LW	(Spain)	Joseba del Olmo	29	EU	Ponferradina	Loan	Summer	N/A	marca.com

Last updated: 31 August

Total income: ▲€0.

Reserves and Academy

No.	Pos.	Nat.	Name	Age	EU	Moving to	Type	Transfer window	Transfer fee	Source
30	GK	(Spain)	Celso	20	EU	Atlético Madrid C	Contract termination	Summer	Free	elgoldemadriz.com
29	LB	(Spain)	Pablo Pagán	19	EU	Eldense	Loan	Summer	N/A	diarioinformacion.com
26	AM	(Bosnia and Herzegovina)	Eldin Hadžić	18	Non-EU	Eibar	Loan	Summer	N/A	herculescf.es

Last updated: 31 August

== Club ==
=== Coaching staff ===
Position	Staff
Head coach	(Spain) Esteban Vigo
Assistant Coach	(Spain) Antonio Méndez Méndez
Fitness Trainer	(Spain) José Manuel Ortega Jiménez
Goalkeeper Coach	(Spain) José Luis González

Source: Wikipedia articles, Guía Marca de la Liga 2011 (ISSN 1575-4707), Especial Liga BBVA 2010–2011 de El Mundo Deportivo

=== Health and Medical staff ===
Position	Staff
Chief medical services	(Spain) José Enrique Carratalá Ferrández
Sports doctor	(Spain) Jeróni Llorca Garnero
Nurse	(Spain) Sigfrido Sastre Martín
Physiotherapist	(Spain) Josep Prades Piñón
Physiotherapist	(Spain) José Ferrández Aranda
Masseur	(Spain) Francisco González Reyes

Source: Wikipedia articles, Guía Marca de la Liga 2011 (ISSN 1575-4707), Especial Liga BBVA 2010–2011 de El Mundo Deportivo

=== Auxiliary staff ===
Position	Staff
Delegate	(Spain) Ángel Linares Serra
Material charge	(Spain) Manuel González Reyes
Assistant in the material	(Spain) Manuel González Aliaga

Source: Wikipedia articles, Guía Marca de la Liga 2011 (ISSN 1575-4707), Especial Liga BBVA 2010–2011 de El Mundo Deportivo

=== Executive and Administrative staff ===
Club owner	(Spain) Enrique Ortiz Selfa
President	(Spain) Valentín Botella Ros
1st Vice-president	(Spain) Juan José Huerga Álvarez
Director General	(Spain) Carlos Parodi García-Pertusa
Administrative Manager	(Spain) Juan Francisco Valera Bocero
Communication Director	(Spain) Sandra Cañamares Monasor
Sporting Director	(Spain) Paquito Escudero
Director of youth football	(Spain) Miguel Aracil

Source: Wikipedia articles, Guía Marca de la Liga 2011 (ISSN 1575-4707), Especial Liga BBVA 2010–2011 de El Mundo Deportivo

== Competitions ==
=== Overall ===
Hércules is going to be present in two national competitions: La Liga and the Copa del Rey.

Competition	Started round	Current position / round	Final position / round	First match	Last match
La Liga	—	10th		28 August 2010	22 May 2011
Copa del Rey	Round of 32	—			

Updated to match played 18 October 2010
Source: Competitions

=== La Liga ===
==== League table ====
Pos	Team	Pld	W	D	L	GF	GA	GD	Pts	Qualification or relegation
16	Getafe	38	12	8	18	49	60	−11	44 (Note: GET 3–0 MLL; MLL 2–0 GET)	
17	Mallorca	38	12	8	18	41	56	−15	44	
18	Deportivo La Coruña (R)	38	10	13	15	31	47	−16	43	Relegation to the Segunda División
19	Hércules (R)	38	9	8	21	36	60	−24	35	Relegation to the Segunda División
20	Almería (R)	38	6	12	20	36	70	−34	30	Relegation to the Segunda División

Source: LFP, sportec.es, Yahoo! Sport
Rules for classification: 1st points; 2nd head-to-head points; 3rd head-to-head goal difference; 4th head-to-head goals scored; 5th goal difference; 6th number of goals scored; 7th Fair-play points
(R) Relegated

==== Results by round ====
Round	1	2	3	4	5	6	7	8	9	10	11	12	13	14	15	16	17	18	19	20	21	22	23	24	25	26	27	28	29	30	31	32	33	34	35	36	37	38
Ground	H	A	H	A	H	A	H	A	H	A	H	A	H	A	H	A	A	H	A	A	H	A	H	A	H	A	H	A	H	A	H	A	H	A	H	H	A	H
Result	L	W	L	D	W	L	D	D	L	L	W	L	W	L	W	D																						
Position	14	9	13	10	10	12	10	13	14	17	13	14	13	14	12	12																						

Updated to match(es) played on 18 October 2010. Source: herculescf.es
A = Away; H = Home; W = Win; D = Draw; L = Loss

=== Competitive ===
==== La Liga ====
28 August 2010 1	Hércules	0–1	Athletic Bilbao	Alicante
18:00 CEST	Pamarot (yellow card) 10'; Fritzler (yellow card) 19' (yellow-red card) 90'; Paz (yellow card) 90+3'	(Report)	(yellow card) 25' Gurpegui; (yellow card) 42' Susaeta; 46' Llorente; (yellow card) 75' Aurtenetxe; (yellow card) 77' Martínez	Stadium: José Rico Pérez; Attendance: 24,000; Referee: (Community of Madrid) Antonio Rubinos Pérez

11 September 2010 2	Barcelona	0–2	Hércules	Barcelona
18:00 CEST	Mascherano (yellow card) 21'; Adriano (yellow card) 42'	(Report)	27', 59' Valdez; (yellow card) 42' Trezeguet; (yellow card) 43' Drenthe	Stadium: Camp Nou; Attendance: 79,363; Referee: (Community of Madrid) Carlos Velasco Carballo

19 September 2010 3	Hércules	1–2	Valencia	Alicante
17:00 CEST	Peña (yellow card) 33'; Trezeguet 43'; Drenthe (yellow card) 83'	(Report)	2' Mata; 23' Hernández; (yellow card) 27' Miguel; (yellow card) 42' (yellow-red card) 49' Navarro; (yellow card) 44' T. Costa; (yellow card) 79' Joaquín; (yellow card) 90+2' Mathieu	Stadium: José Rico Pérez; Attendance: 20,000; Referee: (Andalusia) Rafael Ramírez Domínguez

22 September 2010 4	Real Zaragoza	0–0	Hércules	Zaragoza
20:00 CEST	Obradović (yellow card) 13'; Lafita (yellow card) 55'; Lacruz (yellow card) 66'; Herrera (yellow card) 74'	(Report)	(yellow card) 42' Fitzler; (yellow card) 47' Paz; (yellow card) 90' Gomes	Stadium: La Romareda; Attendance: 12,000; Referee: (Galicia (Spain)) Ignacio Iglesias Villanueva

26 September 2010 5	Hércules	2–0	Sevilla	Alicante
19:00 CEST	Trezeguet 21' (pen.), 38', (yellow card) 28'; Aguilar (yellow card) 87'	(Report)	(yellow card) 64' Dabo	Stadium: José Rico Pérez; Attendance: 20,000; Referee: (Cantabria) Fernando Teixeira Vitienes

3 October 2010 6	Getafe	3–0	Hércules	Getafe (Madrid)
17:00 CEST	[[Dani Parejo|Parejo]] (yellow card) 7', (goal) 20'; Díaz (yellow card) 24'; Manu 42'; Mané (yellow card) 61'; Sánchez (yellow card) 66'; Miku 82'	(Report)	(yellow card) 68' Cortés; (yellow card) 83' Pamarot; (red card) 89' Aguilar	Stadium: Coliseum Alfonso Pérez; Attendance: 11,000; Referee: (Catalonia) Alfonso Álvarez Izquierdo

18 October 2010 7	Hércules	2–2	Villarreal	Alicante
21:00 CEST	Pamarot (yellow card) 9'; Drenthe (yellow card) 24'; Valdez 25', (yellow card) 44'; Trezeguet 40', (red card) 44'; Fitzler 86'	(Report)	28', (yellow card) 88' Capdevila; (red card) 37' Musacchio; (yellow card) 42' (yellow-red card) 84', (goal) 62' Valero; (yellow card) 47' Rossi; (yellow card) 75' Cazorla	Stadium: José Rico Pérez; Attendance: 20,000; Referee: (Asturias) César Muñiz Fernández

24 October 2010 8	Almería	1–1	Hércules	Almería
17:00 CEST	Bernardello (yellow card) 42'; Ulloa 83'; M'Bami (yellow card) 86'	(Report)	(yellow card) 18' Peña; 37' Valdez; (yellow card) 42' Rodri; (yellow card) 59' Aguilar	Stadium: Juegos del Mediterráneo; Referee: (Cantabria) José Antonio Teixeira Vitienes

30 October 2010 9	Hércules	1–3	Real Madrid	Alicante
20:00 CEST	Trezeguet 3'	(Report)	52' Di María; (yellow card) 64' Alonso; (yellow card) 72' Marcelo; (yellow card) 77' Carvalho; 82', 86' Ronaldo	Stadium: José Rico Pérez; Referee: (Aragon) Carlos Clos Gómez

7 November 2010 10	Osasuna	3–0	Hércules	Pamplona
17:00 CET	Monreal 40'; Masoud (yellow card) 44'; Lolo 56'; Vadócz 90'	(Report)	(yellow card) 23' Rodri; (yellow card) 30' Pamarot; (yellow card) 48' Fritzler; (yellow card) 63' Peña	Stadium: Reyno de Navarra; Referee: (Community of Madrid) Antonio Rubinos Pérez

14 November 2010 11	Hércules	2–1	Real Sociedad	Alicante
17:00 CET	Valdez (yellow card) 2'; Trezeguet 46'; Drenthe 52'	(Report)	15' Griezmann; (yellow card) 37' Elustondo; (yellow card) 51' González	Stadium: José Rico Pérez; Referee: (Navarre) Alberto Undiano Mallenco

21 November 2010 12	Espanyol	3–0	Hércules	Cornellà de Llobregat
17:00 CET	Verdú 14'; Márquez (yellow card) 38'; Osvaldo (yellow card) 60', (goal) 80' (pen.); García (yellow card) 44', (goal) 90+1' (pen.)	(Report)	(yellow card) 40' Valdez; (red card) 79' Calatayud	Stadium: Nou Estadi Cornellà-El Prat; Referee: (Andalusia) José Luis Paradas Romero

28 November 2010 13	Hércules	3–1	Levante	Alicante
17:00 CET	Valdez 40', 67', (yellow card) 64'; Paz (yellow card) 57'; Trezeguet 61'	(Report)	(yellow card) 21' Caicedo; 41' Suárez; (yellow card) 42' Cerrajería; (yellow card) 49' Ballesteros	Stadium: José Rico Pérez; Referee: (Catalonia) Xavier Estrada Fernández

6 December 2010 14	Deportivo La Coruña	1–0	Hércules	A Coruña
21:00 CET	Lopo (yellow card) 25'; Lassad 72'; Manuel Pablo (yellow card) 88'	(Report)	(yellow card) 10' Peña; (yellow card) 39' Fritzler; (yellow card) 60' Drenthe; (yellow card) 85' Paz	Stadium: Riazor; Referee: (Andalusia) David Fernández Borbalán

12 December 2010 15	Hércules	4–1	Málaga	Alicante
17:00 CET	Drenthe (yellow card) 23', (goal) 68' (pen.); Paz (yellow card) 26', (goal) 70'; Pamarot (yellow card) 27'; Gomes (yellow card) 44'; Trezeguet 66'; Valdez (yellow card) 68'; Femenía 80'	(Report)	11' Fernández; (yellow card) 40' Duda; (yellow card) 42' Silva; (yellow card) 47' Weligton; (yellow card) 58' Mtiliga	Stadium: José Rico Pérez; Referee: (Castile and León) Javier Turienzo Álvarez

20 December 2010 16	Racing Santander	0–0	Hércules	Santander
21:00 CET	Pinillos (yellow card) 4'; Cisma (yellow card) 80'; Serrano (yellow card) 88'; Rosenberg (yellow card) 90+1'	(Report)	(yellow card) 10' Peña; (yellow card) 80' Sarr	Stadium: El Sardinero; Referee: (Basque Country (autonomous community)) Miguel Ángel Pérez Lasa

3 January 2011 17	Mallorca	3–0	Hércules	Palma de Mallorca
20:00 CET	Cendrós (yellow card) 25'; Nsue 38'; Víctor 41'; Pereira 51'; João Victor (yellow card) 89'		(yellow card) 24' Fritzler; (yellow card) 60' Valdez; (yellow card) 75' Aguilar	Stadium: Iberostar; Attendance: 13,000; Referee: (Andalusia) Rafael Ramírez Domínguez

9 January 2011 18	Hércules	4–1	Atlético Madrid	Alicante
	Tote 11'; Valdez 23'; Thomert 32'; Trezeguet 44'; Peña (yellow card) 53'		89' Reyes	Stadium: José Rico Pérez; Attendance: 24,000; Referee: (Andalusia) Jose Luis Paradas Romero

15 January 2011 19	Sporting Gijón	2–0	Hércules	Gijón
17:00 CET	Barral 1', (yellow card) 27'; Cases 31', (yellow card) 56'; Castro (yellow card) 26'		Trezeguet (yellow card) 44'; Rodri (yellow card) 46'; Cortés (yellow card) 51'; Pamarot (yellow card) 58'; Valdez (yellow card) 90'	Stadium: El Molinón; Attendance: 22,500; Referee: Carlos Clos Gómez

24 January 2011 20	Athletic Bilbao	3–0	Hércules	Bilbao
20:00 CET	Martínez 4'; San José (yellow card) 43'; Llorente 60'; Iraola (yellow card) 60'; Muniain 63'; Koikili (yellow card) 71'		Cortés (yellow card) 7'; Fritzler (yellow card) 16'; Rufete (yellow card) 30'; Portillo (yellow card) 77'	Stadium: San Mamés; Attendance: 30,000; Referee: Alberto Undiano Mallenco

29 January 2011 21	Hércules	0–3	Barcelona	Alicante
19:00 CET	Pedro 42'; Alves (yellow card) 82'; Messi 87', 89'		Aguilar (yellow card) 32'; Peña (yellow card) 44'; Farinós (yellow card) 77' (yellow-red card) 84'	Stadium: José Rico Pérez; Attendance: 29,500; Referee: David Fernández Borbalán

6 February 2011 22	Valencia	2–0	Hércules	Valencia
20:00 CET	Banega (yellow card) 25'; Albelda (yellow card) 28'; Domínguez (yellow card) 33'; Aduriz 42'; T. Costa 52'		Rodri (yellow card) 32'; Thomert (yellow card) 36'	Stadium: Mestalla; Attendance: 40,000; Referee: Fernando Teixeira Vitienes

13 February 2011 23	Hércules	2–1	Real Zaragoza	Alicante
16:00 CET	Cortés (yellow card) 45'; Farinós 80'; Trezeguet 87'		Braulio 5'; Contini (yellow card) 27'; Herrera (yellow card) 55'; Ponzio (yellow card) 59'; N'Daw (yellow card) 81'	Stadium: José Rico Pérez; Attendance: 20,000; Referee: Carlos Velasco Carballo

20 February 2011 24	Sevilla	1–0	Hércules	Seville
18:00 CET	Rakitić 21'; Navas (yellow card) 71'; Escudé (yellow card) 86'		Aguilar (yellow card) 25'; Rodri (yellow card) 36'; Cortés (yellow card) 42'	Stadium: Ramón Sánchez Pizjuán; Attendance: 38,000; Referee: Javier Turienzo Álvarez

27 February 2011 25	Hércules	0–0	Getafe	Alicante
16:00 CET	Pulhac (yellow card) 83' (yellow-red card) 90'; Pamarot (yellow card) 90'		Díaz (yellow card) 42'; Mané (yellow card) 53'	Stadium: José Rico Pérez; Attendance: 18,000; Referee: Alberto Undiano Mallenco

2 March 2011 26	Villarreal	1–0	Hércules	Vilarreal
19:00 CET	Rossi 22'; Cazorla (yellow card) 40'; Ruben (yellow card) 89'		Pamarot (yellow card) 46'; Tote (yellow card) 84'	Stadium: El Madrigal; Attendance: 15,000; Referee: José Luis Paradas Romero

6 March 2011 27	Hércules	1–2	Almería	Alicante
16:00 CET	Pulhac (yellow card) 32'; Paz 50'; Thomert (yellow card) 60'; Hidalgo (yellow card) 90'		Bernardello (yellow card) 60'; Feghouli 70'; M'bami (yellow card) 67', (goal) 73'; Juanito (yellow card) 88'; Luna (yellow card) 90'	Stadium: José Rico Pérez; Attendance: 18,000; Referee: Antonio Rubinos Pérez

12 March 2011 28	Real Madrid	2–0	Hércules	Madrid
19:00 CET	Benzema 24', 56'		Pulhac (yellow card) 78'	Stadium: Santiago Bernabéu; Attendance: 71,000; Referee: Carlos Delgado Ferreiro

20 March 2011 29	Hércules	0–4	Osasuna	Alicante
16:00 CET	Valdez (yellow card) 42'; Femenía (yellow card) 54'		Camuñas 10'; Sola (yellow card) 24', (goal) 67'; Puñal (yellow card) 27'; Nélson 35'; Lolo (yellow card) 58'; Vadócz 59'; Damià (yellow card) 83'	Stadium: José Rico Pérez; Attendance: 17,000; Referee: Eduardo Iturralde González

3 April 2011 30	Real Sociedad	1–3	Hércules	San Sebastián
16:00 CET	Tamudo (yellow card) 20'; Ifrán (yellow card) 78', (goal) 90'		Femenía (yellow card) 10'; Aguilar (yellow card) 13'; Juanra (yellow card) 35'; Farinós (yellow card) 51]'; Portillo 70'; Calatayud (yellow card) 81'; Drenthe 84', 90'	Stadium: Anoeta; Attendance: 22,000; Referee: Carlos Velasco Carballo

10 April 2011 31	Hércules	0–0	Espanyol	Alicante
16:00 CET	Cortés (yellow card) 35'; Aguilar (yellow card) 40'; Drenthe (yellow card) 72'		Rodríguez (yellow card) 23'; Isaías (yellow card) 90'	Stadium: José Rico Pérez; Attendance: 20,000; Referee: Ignacio Iglesias Villanueva

17 April 2011 32	Levante	2–1	Hércules	Valencia
16:00 CET	Suárez 4', (yellow card) 52'; Juanlu 43', (yellow card) 64'; Venta (yellow card) 67'		Drenthe (yellow card) 42'; Pulhac (yellow card) 62'; Trezeguet 81'; Paz (yellow card) 84'	Stadium: Ciutat de València; Attendance: 14,000; Referee: José González González

24 April 2011 33	Hércules	1–0	Deportivo La Coruña	Alicante
16:00 CET	Drenthe (yellow card) 16'; Peña (yellow card) 40'; Gomes 60'		Lopo (yellow card) 33'; Rodríguez (yellow card) 42'; Morel (yellow card) 44'; Domínguez (yellow card) 87'	Stadium: José Rico Pérez; Attendance: 20,000; Referee: Rafael Ramírez Domínguez

1 May 2011 34	Málaga	3–1	Hércules	Málaga
16:00 CET	Baptista 5', 76'; Duda (yellow card) 68'; Weligton (yellow card) 70'; Rondón 73'		Aguilar (yellow card) 24'; Agirre (yellow card) 51'; Fritzler (yellow card) 62' (yellow-red card) 65'; Cortés (yellow card) 66'	Stadium: La Rosaleda; Attendance: 29,638; Referee: Alberto Undiano Mallenco

7 May 2011 35	Hércules	2–3	Racing Santander	Alicante
17:00 CET	Agirre 40'; Gomes 42'; Valdez (red card) 60'; Aguilar (yellow card) 84'		Dos Santos 13', 41'; Álvaro (yellow card) 22'; Henrique 44'	Stadium: José Rico Pérez; Attendance: 20,000; Referee: Miguel Ángel Pérez Lasa

11 May 2011 36	Hércules	2–2	Mallorca	Alicante
20:00 CET	Agirre 12', 41'; Aguilar (yellow card) 37'; Gomes (yellow card) 67'		Cendrós (yellow card) 34'; Víctor (yellow card) 55', (goal) 75'; Webó 79'; Ienaga (yellow card) 90'	Stadium: José Rico Pérez; Attendance: 17,000; Referee: Javier Turienzo Álvarez

15 May 2011 37	Atlético Madrid	2–1	Hércules	Madrid
20:00 CET	Domínguez 1'; Pulido (yellow card) 29'; Valera (yellow card) 29'; Reyes 70'		Cortés (yellow card) 17'; Trezeguet 66'; Paz (yellow card) 74'; Juanra (yellow card) 90'	Stadium: Vicente Calderón; Attendance: 20,000; Referee: Eduardo Iturralde González

21 May 2011 38	Hércules	0–0	Sporting Gijón	Alicante
21:00 CET	Aguilar (yellow card) 36'			Stadium: José Rico Pérez; Attendance: 14,000; Referee: Rafael Ramírez Domínguez

==== Copa del Rey ====
===== Round of 32 =====
27 October 2010 First leg	Hércules	0–0	Málaga	Alicante
21:00 CEST	Gomes (yellow card) 77'	(Report)	(yellow card) 34' Gaspar; (yellow card) 39' Eliseu; (yellow card) 40' Silva	Stadium: José Rico Pérez; Referee: (Castile and León) Javier Turienzo Álvarez

11 November 2010 Second leg	Málaga	3–2	Hércules	Málaga
22:00 CET	Eliseu 11', (yellow card) 39'; Edinho 16'; Fernández 90+1'	(Report)	(yellow card) 19', (goal) 31' Portillo; (yellow card) 51' (yellow-red card) 68', (goal) 64' Aguilar; (yellow card) 69' Rufete; (yellow card) 87' Drenthe	Stadium: La Rosaleda; Referee: (Community of Madrid) Carlos Velasco Carballo

Málaga won 3–2 on aggregate.

=== Pre-season ===
30 July 2010 Friendly	Santa Pola	1–1	Hércules	Santa Pola (Alicante)
20:30 CEST	Pamarot 59' (o.g.)	Report	32' Gomes	Stadium: Manolo Maciá; Attendance: 1,300; Referee: (Spain) (Valencian Community) Jesús Coves Pastor

3 August 2010 Friendly	Eldense	0–4	Hércules	Elda (Alicante)
20:30		Report	27' Portillo; 36' Sendoa; 67' Gomes; 79' Cristian	Stadium: Pepico Amat; Attendance: 2,700; Referee: (Spain) (Valencian Community) Miguel Enrique Candel Cabrera

5 August 2010 Friendly	Orihuela	0–2	Hércules	Orihuela (Alicante)
20:30 CEST		Report	12' Hadžić; 74' Femenía	Stadium: Los Arcos; Attendance: 1,000; Referee: (Spain) (Valencian Community) Francisco Javier Mateo Valero

7 August 2010 Friendly	Alcoyano	0–1	Hércules	Alcoy (Alicante)
20:30 CEST		Report	56' Sendoa	Stadium: El Collao; Attendance: 1,500; Referee: (Spain) (Valencian Community) Óscar Ruiz García

12 August 2010 Friendly	Granada	0–1	Hércules	Almuñécar (Granada)
21:00 CEST		Report	75' Portillo	Stadium: Municipal Francisco Bonet; Attendance: 3,500; Referee: (Spain) (Andalusia) José Luis Paradas Romero

14 August 2010 Festa D'Elx Trophy	Elche	0–1	Hércules	Elche (Alicante)
22:00 CEST		Report	8' Gomes	Stadium: Martínez Valero; Attendance: 2,000; Referee: (Spain) (Community of Madrid) Carlos del Cerro Grande

18 August 2010 Friendly	Lorca Atlético	0–2	Hércules	Lorca (Murcia)
20:30 CEST		Report	18' Portillo; 63' Juanra	Stadium: Francisco Artés Carrasco; Attendance: 600; Referee: (Spain) (Region of Murcia) Francisco Alejandro Navarro Fuentes

22 August 2010 Alicante Trophy	Hércules	1–3	Real Madrid	Alicante
22:00 CEST	Sendoa 40'	Report	56' Benzema; 76' Di María; 81' Benzema	Stadium: José Rico Pérez; Attendance: 13,000; Referee: (Spain) (Valencian Community) Antonio Mateu Lahoz
