= Rodri (footballer, born 1984) =

Spanish footballer

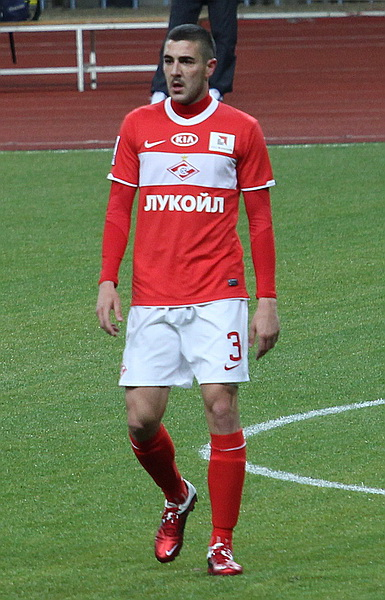
- Rodri in action for Spartak Moscow

Personal information
- Full name: Sergio Rodríguez García
- Date of birth: 17 August 1984 (age 42)
- Place of birth: Mataró, Spain
- Height: 1.85 m (6 ft 1 in)
- Position: Centre back

Youth career
- Barcelona

Senior career*
Years	Team	Apps	(Gls)
2002–2004	Barcelona C	32	(1)
2003–2006	Barcelona B	95	(2)
2004–2006	Barcelona	5	(0)
2006–2009	Deportivo La Coruña	2	(0)
2007	→ Almería (loan)	11	(0)
2007–2008	→ Poli Ejido (loan)	25	(0)
2008–2009	→ Marítimo (loan)	0	(0)
2009	→ Salamanca (loan)	17	(2)
2009–2011	Hércules	51	(4)
2011–2012	Spartak Moscow	23	(1)
2012–2014	Rayo Vallecano	5	(0)
2014–2016	Eupen	60	(11)
2016–2017	Llagostera	12	(0)
2017–2019	Hospitalet	44	(7)
Total		382	(28)

International career
2003	Spain U20	1	(0)
- * Club domestic league appearances and goals

Sergio Rodríguez García (born 17 August 1984), commonly known as Rodri, is a Spanish former professional footballer who played as a central defender.

== Club career ==
Born in Mataró, Barcelona, Catalonia, Rodri was a product of FC Barcelona's youth system. He played only two La Liga games with the first team over the course of two seasons, his first being on 11 December 2004 in a 2–1 away win against Albacete Balompié (three minutes played), and Barça were eventually crowned back-to-back champions in his second year, although he was mainly registered with the B-side.

During the summer of 2006, Rodri was purchased by Galicia's Deportivo de La Coruña, making just six competitive appearances for the main squad in two seasons. In January 2007, he was loaned to second division club UD Almería, playing the entire 2007–08 campaign with Polideportivo Ejido, also in that tier and in Andalusia.

Rodri was again loaned by Depor in September 2008, joining Portuguese Primeira Liga team C.S. Marítimo. However, not having been used during his brief spell, he returned to A Coruña, moving in January 2009 to another Spanish division two side, UD Salamanca.

In late July 2009, Rodri was released by Deportivo and stayed in the second tier, signing a 1+1 contract with Hércules CF. In his first year he experienced his best season as a professional, scoring four goals in 38 matches as the Alicante club returned to the top flight after a 13-year absence.

Rodri appeared in 13 games for Hércules in 2010–11, mainly due to injury or suspension to habitual starters Abraham Paz and Noé Pamarot. In March 2011, he moved to FC Spartak Moscow in Russia for €400,000, signing a one-year deal.

After his contract ended, Rodri left Spartak. On 31 August 2012, he returned to his homeland and joined Rayo Vallecano. After two years in the Belgian First Division B with K.A.S. Eupen, he resumed his career in the Spanish lower leagues.
