= Antonio Mendez (disambiguation) =

Antonio Mendez may refer to:

- Antonio Mendez (born 1940), American agent
- Antonio Méndez (born 1970), Spanish athlete

== See also ==
- António Mendes (disambiguation)
- Tony Mendez
- Toni Mendez
