= Royston Drenthe =

Dutch former association footballer (born 1987)

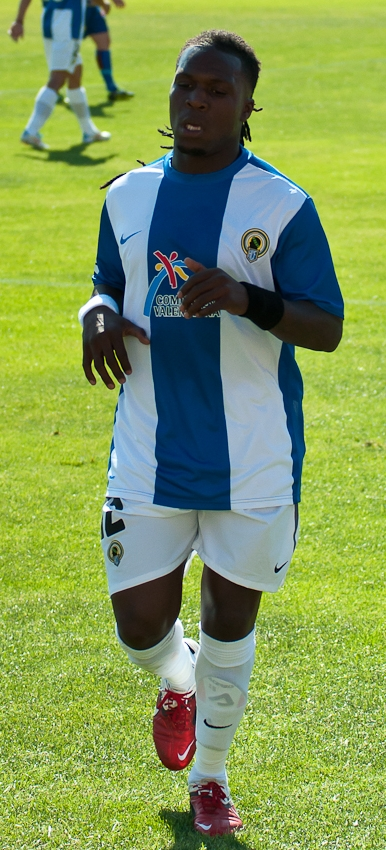
- Drenthe with Hércules in 2011

Personal information
- Full name: Royston Ricky Drenthe
- Date of birth: 8 April 1987 (age 39)
- Place of birth: Rotterdam, Netherlands
- Height: 1.67 m (5 ft 6 in)
- Positions: Left winger; left-back

Youth career
- 1992–2000: SC Neptunus
- 2000–2003: Feyenoord
- 2003–2005: Excelsior

Senior career*
| Years | Team | Apps | (Gls) |
| 2005–2007 | Feyenoord | 29 | (0) |
| 2007–2012 | Real Madrid | 46 | (2) |
| 2010–2011 | → Hércules (loan) | 17 | (4) |
| 2011–2012 | → Everton (loan) | 21 | (3) |
| 2012–2013 | Alania Vladikavkaz | 6 | (3) |
| 2013–2015 | Reading | 23 | (2) |
| 2014–2015 | → Sheffield Wednesday (loan) | 15 | (1) |
| 2015 | Kayseri Erciyesspor | 11 | (3) |
| 2015–2016 | Baniyas | 18 | (0) |
| 2018–2019 | Sparta Rotterdam | 32 | (5) |
| 2019–2021 | Kozakken Boys | 9 | (3) |
| 2021–2022 | Racing Murcia | 28 | (9) |
| 2022 | → Real Murcia (loan) | 9 | (0) |
| 2022 | Racing Mérida City | 15 | (3) |
| 2023 | Kozakken Boys | 5 | (0) |
| Total | | 284 | (38) |

International career
| 2005 | Netherlands U18 | 1 | (0) |
| 2005–2006 | Netherlands U19 | 6 | (0) |
| 2006–2008 | Netherlands U21 | 17 | (4) |
| 2008 | Netherlands B | 1 | (0) |
| 2010 | Netherlands | 1 | (0) |
Medal record
Representing Netherlands
UEFA U-21 Euro
| Winner | 2007 Netherlands |
- * Club domestic league appearances and goals

Royston Ricky Drenthe (born 8 April 1987) is a Dutch former professional footballer. Although primarily a left winger, he has also played as a left-back.

Drenthe started his professional career with Eredivisie side Feyenoord in 2005, having graduated from the club's youth academy. He made 37 appearances for the side before switching to La Liga club Real Madrid in 2007. During his five years in Madrid, he made 65 appearances for the club, spending time on loan at Hércules and Premier League side Everton, making 19 and 27 appearances for those clubs respectively. He then joined Russian Premier League side Alania Vladikavkaz in February 2013 on a free transfer, making six appearances in a brief spell at the club, before he joined Reading in June 2013. In January 2015, he joined Kayseri Erciyessor, before moving to UAE Pro League side Baniyas Club in September 2015. After being released by Baniyas in July 2016, Drenthe announced his retirement from playing. He has since begun recording music under the name Roya2Faces. After two years, Drenthe came out of retirement to play for Sparta Rotterdam in 2018.

Drenthe made 17 appearances for the Netherlands under-21s between 2006 and 2008, and was a member of the team that won the 2007 European Championship. He later made one appearance for the Netherlands B team and also featured once for the full national team.

== Club career ==
=== Youth ===
Born in Rotterdam, Drenthe, who is of Surinamese descent, joined local side Feyenoord's youth system at the age of 13, playing mainly as a winger during his junior years. After disciplinary issues during a trip to Switzerland with the B-side, coach Marcel Bout wanted him to leave the club, but the issues were resolved after the intervention of Rob Baan, the club's director of football.

Bout hardly used Drenthe in his subsequent lineups, and, at the end of the season, the 16-year-old was named as one of eleven players whose future at the club was questionable. He eventually moved to Feyenoord feeder club Excelsior.

Drenthe improved during the two years he played at Excelsior, with manager Marco van Lochem successfully playing him as left back. After impressing his former side's coaching staff, he was asked to rejoin the club, which he accepted.

=== Feyenoord ===
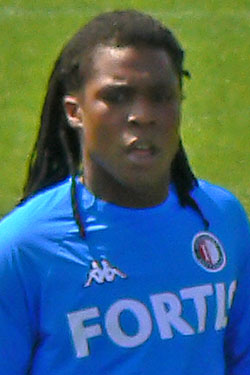
Drenthe with Feyenoord.

In the 2005–06 season, Drenthe was promoted to Feyenoord's first team, managed by his former youth coach Henk Fräser. After scoring three goals against Ajax in the Otten Cup youth tournament he began training with the main squad, while still appearing for the reserves.

In the same week where he helped his club to a 5–1 win at Ajax with the second team, Drenthe was offered a professional contract at Feyenoord. Manager Erwin Koeman handed him his Eredivisie debut against Vitesse at the Gelredome, and the player finished the season with three matches.

In 2006–07, Feyenoord signed veteran Belgian Philippe Léonard, while Pascal Bosschaart was also still part of the squad. After the former suffered an injury and the latter was transferred to ADO Den Haag, Drenthe became first-choice as Feyenoord finished seventh in the league.

After winning the 2007 UEFA European Under-21 Championship with the Netherlands, Feyenoord accepted a €14 million bid by Real Madrid after Drenthe threatened to take his club to court if they did not want to let him go.

=== Real Madrid ===
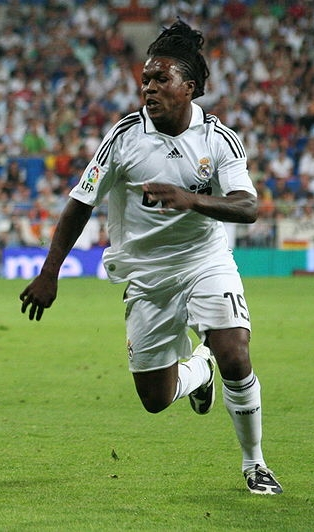
Drenthe with Real Madrid in 2008

Drenthe was presented as a Real Madrid player on 13 August 2007, alongside compatriot Wesley Sneijder. He made his official debut as a midfielder in the second leg of the season's Spanish Supercup against Sevilla, and scored the 1–1 equaliser from 40 yards out, with the ball hitting the crossbar and crossing the line. The Merengues, however, lost 3–5 at home and 3–6 on aggregate.

Drenthe played regularly for Real Madrid in his debut season, in both left-wing positions, but began appearing less after the development of Marcelo, being dropped from the list of 18 by manager Bernd Schuster in several games. At one time, after being left out for the match against Valencia, Drenthe stormed out of the training ground. He finished the campaign with 18 league appearances (plus four in the season's UEFA Champions League), scoring his first league goal against Real Valladolid in a 7–0 home routing on 10 February 2008.

Despite rumours of him leaving the club on loan, Drenthe featured in 15 of Real Madrid's first 18 games of the 2008–09 season. However, he also suffered from anxiety issues after being booed by the club's supporters during a 1–0 home win against Deportivo de La Coruña and did not feature for the club for a period, although manager Juande Ramos offered the player his support and insisted he would help him. The manager later revealed that the player asked not to be picked for the three games after the Deportivo fixture.

On 31 August 2010, after having appeared rarely in his third season, Drenthe was loaned to Hércules in a season-long move. He made his debut on 11 September in a 2–0 away win against Barcelona, and scored his first goal for the club on 14 November, netting from a free kick against Real Sociedad in a 2–1 home victory. His performances with the Alicante team were subsequently praised by the Spanish press. However, the player would soon fall out of favour with the club's board of directors and coaching staff after arriving one week after the winter break ended, citing a "loss of confidence in Hércules management", rather than what was previously perceived as "a protest over unpaid wages".

On 3 April 2011, in his second game after his suspension, Drenthe scored twice to help Hércules to its first away win since September, a 3–1 against Real Sociedad. He ended the season with 15 starts in 1,299 minutes of action, with his team being finally relegated.

=== Everton ===
On 31 August 2011, Drenthe joined Premier League club Everton on a season-long loan deal. He made his Premier League debut as a second-half substitute in the 2–2 home draw against Aston Villa, on 10 September. Again from the bench, against Wigan Athletic, he scored in the 97th minute to round off a 3–1 home victory.

Drenthe made his first start for Everton on 21 September 2011 in a League Cup match against West Bromwich Albion, assisting the winning goal for Phil Neville in the 13th minute of extra time (2–1 home win). On his full league debut, at Fulham on 23 October, he found the net just three minutes into the game in an eventual 3–1 win.

On 21 December 2011, after three weeks out of the game due to an ankle injury, Drenthe assisted Leon Osman for the game's only goal at home against Swansea City. On 18 February 2012, in a match against Blackpool for the season's FA Cup, he scored after just 49 seconds in a 2–0 home success. Drenthe started in the next game for Everton, scoring a powerful low drive from 20 yards out for the first goal of the 1–1 away draw against Queens Park Rangers.

In March 2012, Drenthe was given a leave of absence on compassionate grounds and, upon returning, he reported late for training. This resulted in manager David Moyes omitting the player from Everton's FA Cup semi-final squad; he was also told to stay away from the club. Former Everton Goalkeeper Tim Howard confirmed that poor discipline and attitude around the club played its part in Drenthe being left out the squad.

In a magazine interview published in April, he accused Barcelona's Lionel Messi of racially abusing him on more than one occasion, repeatedly addressing him as "negro".

=== Alania Vladikavkaz ===
Drenthe left Real Madrid after his contract expired on 30 June 2012. In December, he signed a deal with Russian club Alania Vladikavkaz, which came into effect on 2 February of the following year. Drenthe made his league debut for his new team on 9 March 2013, against Rostov. After the game, coach Valery Gazzaev called him a "great professional and an example for the youth". On 15 April, in only his fifth game for the club, he scored a hat-trick in a 3–1 home win over relegation competitors Mordovia Saransk.

=== Reading ===
Reading officially confirmed the signing of free agent Drenthe on a two-year contract with the option of a third, on 21 June 2013. On 8 March 2014, Drenthe scored his first goal for the club in a 1–1 draw away at Brighton & Hove Albion after he cut in from the right and fired a left-footed shot into the bottom corner. Drenthe then scored his second goal for the club on 11 March in a 4–2 away win against Leeds United with a free-kick just after half-time. In July 2014, Drenthe was told he could leave Reading after only one season with the club, whilst being stripped of his squad number when the official squad numbers were announced on 14 July 2014.

=== Sheffield Wednesday ===
Drenthe joined Sheffield Wednesday on a six-month loan on 1 September 2014, halfway through transfer deadline day. He made his Owls debut as a second-half substitute for Chris Maguire in the 0–0 away draw against Bolton Wanderers on 13 September. His only Owls goal came in the 1–1 away draw at Charlton Athletic on 1 November.

=== Kayseri Erciyesspor ===
On 23 January 2015, Drenthe joined Turkish Süper Lig side Kayseri Erciyesspor.

=== Baniyas ===
Drenthe joined UAE Pro League side Baniyas Club in September 2015. He was released in July 2016.

=== Hiatus ===
Unable to find a club, Drenthe announced a hiatus from professional football, saying that he was 'no longer a footballer'.

=== Sparta ===
After training with the side for a few weeks, on 6 July 2018 Sparta Rotterdam announced they had signed Drenthe to a one-year deal. After Sparta Rotterdam promoted to the Eredivisie during the Keukenkampioen 2018–2019 season, the club decided not to extend his contract.

=== Kozakken Boys ===
Drenthe then signed for Kozakken Boys.

=== Return to Spain ===
On 6 January 2021, Drenthe returned to Spain and signed with Racing Murcia. On 30 January 2022, Drenthe was loaned to Real Murcia, playing in the same city but a tier above Racing. In August 2022, he joined Racing Mérida City in the sixth-tier Primera División Extremeña.

=== Return to Kozakken Boys ===
At the end of 2022 he returned to Kozakken Boys on a try-out.

On 17 November 2023, Drenthe announced his retirement from professional football.

== International career ==
After his first full season at Feyenoord, Drenthe was called by Dutch under-21 coach Foppe de Haan to be part of his squad for the 2007 UEFA European Championship, which was held in the Netherlands. He was one of the most important players in the second consecutive title of the competition for the Jong Oranje, being chosen by UEFA as Player of the Tournament. The following year, he represented the nation at the 2008 Summer Olympics.

On 14 November 2010, Drenthe was selected for the first time for the Dutch senior team, as coach Bert van Marwijk picked him as a late replacement for the injured Urby Emanuelson. Three days later, he made his debut, coming on as a second-half substitute in the 1–0 friendly win over Turkey.

== Personal life ==
Drenthe's younger brother, Giovanni, is also a footballer. The striker opted to represent Suriname internationally. His cousin, Georginio Wijnaldum, was another Feyenoord academy product. He is also the cousin of the Suriname international Tyrone Conraad.

Drenthe dated Spanish Playboy model Malena Gracia.

Drenthe recorded a rap song with his friend U-Niq called "Tak Takie".

In 2014, Drenthe opened a clothing store in Rotterdam with Michel Poldervaart.

In December 2020, Drenthe declared bankruptcy after losing £3.2 million.

Drenthe has eight children from different relationships. In 2023 he started working in the healthcare sector, as he explained 'My entire family has always been in care'.

=== As TV commentator ===
Drenthe was contracted by the Spanish sports program El Chiringuito de Jugones as commentator, on 1 March 2021.

== Health ==
In October 2025, Drenthe suffered a stroke and was hospitalised. His representatives confirmed he was receiving medical care, and former club Everton publicly wished him a speedy return to health. In late 2025, his manager reported that he is undergoing rehabilitation and expressed confidence in a successful recovery.

== Career statistics ==
Appearances and goals by club, season and competition
| Club | Season | League | | | National cup | | Continental | | Other | | Total | |
| Club | Season | Division | Apps | Goals | Apps | Goals | Apps | Goals | Apps | Goals | Apps | Goals |
|---|---|---|---|---|---|---|---|---|---|---|---|---|
| Feyenoord | 2005–06 | Eredivisie | 3 | 0 | 0 | 0 | 0 | 0 | 1 (Note: Appearances in Eredivisie play-offs) | 0 | 4 | 0 |
| Feyenoord | 2006–07 | Eredivisie | 26 | 0 | 1 | 0 | 4 (Note: Appearances in UEFA Cup) | 0 | 2 | 0 | 33 | 0 |
| Feyenoord | Total | | 29 | 0 | 1 | 0 | 4 | 0 | 3 | 0 | 37 | 0 |
| Real Madrid | 2007–08 | La Liga | 18 | 2 | 3 | 0 | 4 (Note: Appearances in UEFA Champions League) | 0 | 1 (Note: Appearance in Supercopa de España) | 1 | 26 | 3 |
| Real Madrid | 2008–09 | La Liga | 20 | 0 | 2 | 0 | 5 | 0 | 1 | 0 | 28 | 0 |
| Real Madrid | 2009–10 | La Liga | 8 | 0 | 1 | 0 | 2 | 1 | — | | 11 | 1 |
| Real Madrid | Total | | 46 | 2 | 6 | 0 | 11 | 1 | 2 | 1 | 65 | 4 |
| Hércules (loan) | 2010–11 | La Liga | 17 | 4 | 2 | 0 | — | | — | | 19 | 4 |
| Everton (loan) | 2011–12 | Premier League | 21 | 3 | 4 | 1 | — | | 2 (Note: Appearances in League Cup) | 0 | 27 | 4 |
| Alania | 2012–13 | Russian Premier League | 6 | 3 | 0 | 0 | — | | — | | 6 | 3 |
| Reading | 2013–14 | Championship | 23 | 2 | 1 | 0 | — | | 0 | 0 | 24 | 2 |
| Sheffield Wednesday (loan) | 2014–15 | Championship | 15 | 1 | 0 | 0 | — | | 0 | 0 | 15 | 1 |
| Kayseri Erciyesspor | 2014–15 | Süper Lig | 11 | 3 | — | | — | | — | | 11 | 3 |
| Baniyas | 2015–16 | UAE Pro League | 18 | 0 | 3 | 0 | — | | — | | 21 | 0 |
| Sparta Rotterdam | 2018–19 | Eerste Divisie | 32 | 5 | 0 | 0 | — | | 0 | 0 | 32 | 5 |
| Kozakken Boys | 2019–20 | Tweede Divisie | 9 | 3 | 1 | 0 | — | | — | | 10 | 3 |
| Kozakken Boys | 2020–21 | Tweede Divisie | 1 | 0 | 0 | 0 | — | | — | | 1 | 0 |
| Kozakken Boys | Total | | 10 | 3 | 1 | 0 | — | | — | | 11 | 3 |
| Racing Murcia | 2020–21 | Tercera División | 15 (Note: Includes six appearances in the second phase) | 8 (Note: Includes four goals in the second phase) | — | | — | | 2 (Note: Appearances in Segunda División B play-offs) | 1 | 17 | 9 |
| Racing Murcia | 2021–22 | Tercera División RFEF | 13 | 1 | — | | — | | — | | 13 | 1 |
| Racing Murcia | Total | | 28 | 9 | — | | — | | 2 | 1 | 30 | 10 |
| Real Murcia | 2021–22 | Segunda División RFEF | 8 | 0 | — | | — | | — | | 8 | 0 |
| Career total | | | 261 | 35 | 18 | 1 | 15 | 1 | 9 | 2 | 305 | 39 |

== Honours ==
Real Madrid

- La Liga: 2007–08
- Supercopa de España: 2008; runner-up: 2007

Sparta Rotterdam

- Eerste Divisie
  - Play-off Promotion: 2018–19

Netherlands U21

- UEFA European Under-21 Championship: 2007

Individual

- UEFA European Under-21 Championship Golden Player: 2007
