= António Mendes =

António Mendes may refer to:

- António Mendes Belo (1842–1929), Portuguese bishop
- António Mendes Correia (1888–1960), Portuguese scientist
- António Mendes (footballer) (1939–2019), Portuguese footballer

== See also ==
- Antonio Mendez (disambiguation)
- Tony Mendes, American rodeo cowboy
