= Aracil =

Aracil is a Spanish surname of Navarran origin. Notable people with the surname include:

- Miguel Aracil (born 1957), Spanish footballer
- Alejandro Pérez Aracil (born 1985), Spanish footballer
- Miguel Alfonso Pérez Aracil (born 1980), Spanish footballer
