= Abraham Paz =

Spanish footballer (born 1979)

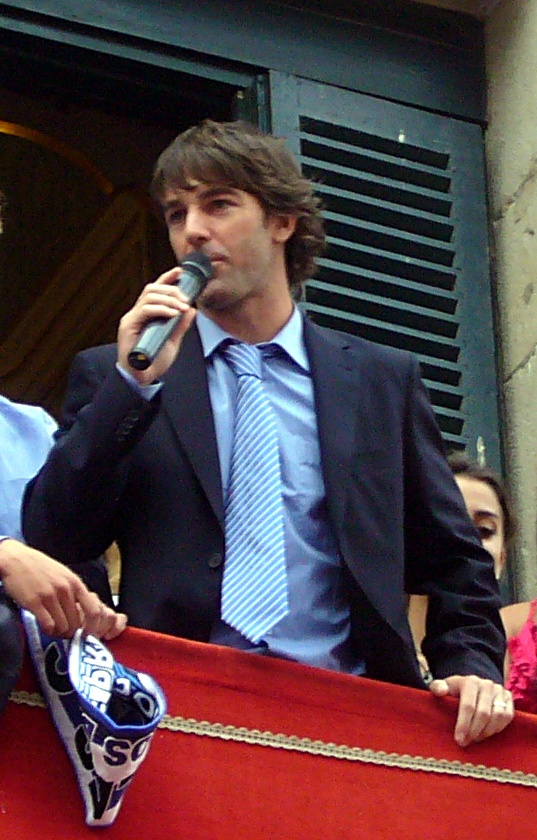
- Paz with Hércules in 2010

Personal information
- Full name: Abraham Paz Cruz
- Date of birth: 29 June 1979 (age 47)
- Place of birth: El Puerto de Santa María, Spain
- Height: 1.78 m (5 ft 10 in)
- Position: Centre-back

Team information
- Current team: Antequera (manager)

Youth career
- 1991–1996: Safa San Luis
- 1996–1997: Cádiz

Senior career*
Years	Team	Apps	(Gls)
1997–1999	Cádiz B		
1999–2008	Cádiz	218	(31)
1999–2000	→ Portuense (loan)		
2008–2011	Hércules	91	(8)
2011–2012	Cartagena	34	(3)
2012–2013	Sabadell	31	(3)
2013–2018	Bnei Sakhnin	139	(8)
2015	→ Maccabi Haifa (loan)	13	(0)
2019	St Joseph's	11	(2)
Total		537+	(55+)

Managerial career
- 2020–2022: Sanluqueño (assistant)
- 2022–2025: St Joseph's
- 2025–: Antequera
- * Club domestic league appearances and goals

Abraham Paz Cruz (born 29 June 1979) is a Spanish former professional footballer who played as a central defender. He is the current manager of Primera Federación club Antequera.

== Playing career ==
Born in El Puerto de Santa María, Province of Cádiz, Paz began his career his professional with the reserves of local club Cádiz CF, his stint then also being punctuated by a loan to hometown's Racing Club Portuense. He was definitely reinstated in the first team in 2000, going on to represent them in all three major divisions (including 22 games and one goal in 2005–06's La Liga).

Paz joined Hércules CF of the Segunda División in the summer of 2008. He contributed 31 matches and two goals in his second season, as the Alicante side returned to the top division after a 13-year absence.

On 12 December 2010, during a 4–1 home win against Málaga CF, Paz became the first Spanish scorer for Hércules in 2010–11, as the campaign ended in immediate relegation. From 2011 to 2013 he competed in the second tier, representing FC Cartagena and CE Sabadell FC and suffering relegation with the former.

On 16 July 2013, aged 34, Paz moved abroad for the very first time, signing a two-year contract with Israeli club Bnei Sakhnin FC– he had just been banned from playing in his country while investigations were carried out to determine whether or not he was involved in match fixing when he represented Hércules. During his spell in the Holy Land, he was also loaned to fellow Premier League team Maccabi Haifa FC; ultimately, he was acquitted of any wrongdoing.

In January 2019, Paz joined St Joseph's F.C. of the Gibraltar Premier Division on a short-team deal.

== Coaching career ==
Shortly after retiring, Paz became assistant manager at Atlético Sanluqueño CF. He had his first head coach job on 8 June 2022, being appointed at former side St Joseph's.

Paz returned to Spain three years later, taking over Primera Federación club Antequera CF following Abel Gómez's dismissal.

== Career statistics ==
As of 15 May 2016

Club	Season	League			Cup		Continental		Total	
Club	Season	Division	Apps	Goals	Apps	Goals	Apps	Goals	Apps	Goals
Cádiz	1998–99	Segunda División B	0	0	1	0	—		1	0
Cádiz	1999–2000	Segunda División B	0	0	0	0	—		0	0
Cádiz	2000–01	Segunda División B	13	2	0	0	2 (Note: Appearances in Segunda División B play-offs)	1	15	3
Cádiz	2001–02	Segunda División B	26	1	2	0	—		28	1
Cádiz	2002–03	Segunda División B	36	5	0	0	6	3	42	8
Cádiz	2003–04	Segunda División	35	4	1	0	—		36	4
Cádiz	2004–05	Segunda División	39	5	2	0	—		41	5
Cádiz	2005–06	La Liga	22	1	3	0	—		25	1
Cádiz	2006–07	Segunda División	14	5	1	3	—		15	8
Cádiz	2007–08	Segunda División	26	3	1	0	—		27	3
Cádiz	Total		211	26	11	3	8	4	230	33
Hércules	2008–09	Segunda División	31	4	4	0	—		35	4
Hércules	2009–10	Segunda División	31	2	1	0	—		32	2
Hércules	2010–11	La Liga	29	2	0	0	—		29	2
Hércules	Total		91	8	5	0	—		96	8
Cartagena	2011–12	Segunda División	34	3	0	0	—		34	3
Sabadell	2012–13	Segunda División	31	3	0	0	—		31	3
Bnei Sakhnin	2013–14	Israeli Premier League	35	1	1	0	—		36	1
Bnei Sakhnin	2014–15	Israeli Premier League	20	1	6	1	—		26	2
Bnei Sakhnin	2015–16	Israeli Premier League	31	0	8	1	—		39	1
Bnei Sakhnin	Total		60	2	11	1	—		71	3
Maccabi Haifa (loan)	2014–15	Israeli Premier League	13	0	0	0	—		13	0
Career total			440	42	27	4	8	4	475	50

== Managerial statistics ==
As of 25 April 2026

Managerial record by team and tenure
Team	Nat	From	To	Record								Ref
Team	Nat	From	To	G	W	D	L	GF	GA	GD	Win %	Ref
St Joseph's	(Gibraltar)	8 June 2022	30 November 2025	100	67	15	18	233	90	+143	67.00	
Antequera	(Spain)	30 November 2025	Present	20	10	1	9	27	28	−1	50.00	
Total				120	77	16	27	260	118	+142	64.17	—

== Honours ==
Cádiz

- Segunda División: 2004–05
