= Tiago Gomes (footballer, born 1985) =

Portuguese footballer

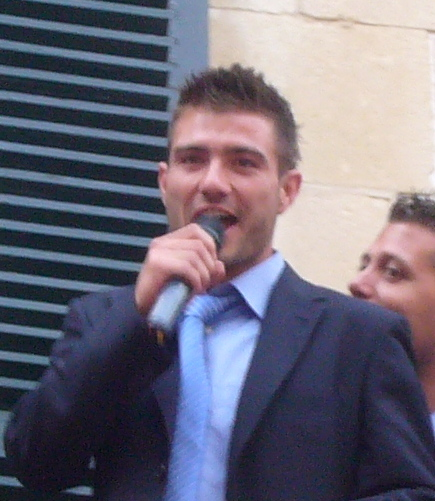
- Gomes with Hércules in 2010

Personal information
- Full name: Tiago Filipe Figueiras Gomes
- Date of birth: 19 August 1985 (age 41)
- Place of birth: Vila Franca de Xira, Portugal
- Height: 1.78 m (5 ft 10 in)
- Position: Midfielder

Youth career
- 1994–1996: Vilafranquense
- 1997–2003: Benfica
- 2003–2004: Estoril

Senior career*
| Years | Team | Apps | (Gls) |
| 2004 | Estoril | 1 | (0) |
| 2004–2005 | Oriental | 41 | (9) |
| 2006 | Odivelas | 17 | (1) |
| 2006–2009 | Estrela Amadora | 49 | (3) |
| 2008–2009 | → Steaua București (loan) | 24 | (0) |
| 2009–2012 | Hércules | 97 | (8) |
| 2012–2013 | Blackpool | 25 | (0) |
| 2013–2015 | APOEL | 36 | (1) |
| 2016 | Nea Salamina | 15 | (0) |
| 2016–2017 | Doxa | 35 | (6) |
| 2018 | Melaka United | 12 | (1) |
| Total | | 352 | (29) |

International career
| 2007 | Portugal U21 | 2 | (0) |
- * Club domestic league appearances and goals

Tiago Filipe Figueiras Gomes (born 19 August 1985) is a Portuguese former professional footballer who played as a central midfielder.

== Club career ==
=== Portugal ===
Born in Vila Franca de Xira, Lisbon District, Gomes was part of the S.L. Benfica youth system for a few years. His first professional seasons were also spent in the Lisbon area, with G.D. Estoril Praia, Clube Oriental de Lisboa and Odivelas FC.

Gomes made his debut in Primeira Liga with another team from the capital, C.F. Estrela da Amadora, first appearing against Associação Naval 1º de Maio on 27 August 2006, He was ever-present throughout the entire campaign, playing alongside another Benfica youth product, namesake Tiago Henrique Damil Gomes.

=== Steaua and Hércules ===
On 29 May 2008, after a two-month spell in Málaga CF in which he failed to make an official appearance due to delays in the arrival of his international transfer, Gomes joined FC Steaua București on loan from Estrela, with the Romanian club retaining an option to buy him at the end of the season. In mid-July 2009, he was sold to Hércules CF in Spain for €400,000 upon signing a three-year contract. He appeared in 37 Segunda División games and scored six goals in his first season, in a return to La Liga after a 13-year absence.

Gomes was again regularly used in 2010–11. On 24 April 2011, he scored his first Spanish top-flight goal in a 1–0 home win over Deportivo de La Coruña, adding a second two games later against Racing de Santander in a 2–3 home loss, but the team from Alicante was eventually relegated after only one year.

=== Blackpool ===
On 24 July 2012, Gomes signed a one-year deal with Football League Championship club Blackpool after his contract with Hércules expired. He made his competitive debut on 18 August by starting and playing 56 minutes in a 2–0 victory at Millwall. He finished his only season with 27 total appearances (no goals).

=== APOEL ===
On 14 June 2013, Gomes moved teams and countries again, penning a two-year contract with APOEL FC from the Cypriot First Division. He made his debut against NK Maribor on 31 July, in a 1–1 home draw in the third qualifying round of the UEFA Champions League. In the 2013–14 season he appeared in three games in the group stage of the UEFA Europa League, and helped his side claim a treble of league, Cup and Super Cup.

Gomes scored his first official goal for APOEL on 21 March 2015, in his team's 2–2 home draw with Apollon Limassol in the league playoffs. In his second year, he played every game in his team's Champions League campaign.

On 25 May 2015, one day after winning his second consecutive double, Gomes left the club as it was announced his contract would not be renewed.

== International career ==
Gomes made two appearances for Portugal at under-21 level, his first call-up being in March 2007.

== Career statistics ==
As of 12 May 2018

| Club | Season | League | | | National Cup | | League Cup | | Continental | | Other (Note: Includes Cypriot Super Cup and La Liga play-offs) | | Total | |
| Club | Season | Division | Apps | Goals | Apps | Goals | Apps | Goals | Apps | Goals | Apps | Goals | Apps | Goals |
|---|---|---|---|---|---|---|---|---|---|---|---|---|---|---|
| Estoril | 2003–04 | Segunda Liga | 1 | 0 | 0 | 0 | — | | — | | — | | 1 | 0 |
| Oriental | 2004–05 | Segunda Divisão | 32 | 5 | 2 | 0 | — | | — | | — | | 34 | 5 |
| Oriental | 2005–06 | Segunda Divisão | 9 | 4 | 0 | 0 | — | | — | | — | | 9 | 4 |
| Oriental | Total | | 41 | 9 | 2 | 0 | — | | — | | — | | 43 | 9 |
| Odivelas | 2005–06 | Segunda Divisão | 17 | 1 | 0 | 0 | — | | — | | — | | 17 | 1 |
| Estrela Amadora | 2006–07 | Primeira Liga | 28 | 2 | 2 | 0 | — | | — | | — | | 30 | 2 |
| Estrela Amadora | 2007–08 | Primeira Liga | 21 | 1 | 2 | 0 | 1 | 0 | — | | — | | 24 | 1 |
| Estrela Amadora | Total | | 49 | 3 | 4 | 0 | 1 | 0 | — | | — | | 54 | 3 |
| Steaua București | 2008–09 | Liga I | 24 | 0 | 1 | 0 | — | | 6 | 0 | — | | 31 | 0 |
| Hércules | 2009–10 | Segunda División | 37 | 6 | 4 | 1 | — | | — | | — | | 41 | 7 |
| Hércules | 2010–11 | La Liga | 28 | 2 | 2 | 0 | — | | — | | — | | 30 | 2 |
| Hércules | 2011–12 | Segunda División | 32 | 0 | 0 | 0 | — | | — | | 2 | 0 | 34 | 0 |
| Hércules | Total | | 97 | 8 | 6 | 1 | — | | — | | 2 | 0 | 105 | 9 |
| Blackpool | 2012–13 | Championship | 25 | 0 | 1 | 0 | 1 | 0 | — | | — | | 27 | 0 |
| APOEL | 2013–14 | Cypriot First Division | 15 | 0 | 4 | 0 | — | | 7 | 0 | 1 | 0 | 27 | 0 |
| APOEL | 2014–15 | Cypriot First Division | 21 | 1 | 4 | 0 | — | | 10 | 0 | 1 | 0 | 36 | 1 |
| APOEL | Total | | 36 | 1 | 8 | 0 | — | | 17 | 0 | 2 | 0 | 63 | 1 |
| Nea Salamina | 2015–16 | Cypriot First Division | 15 | 0 | 2 | 0 | — | | — | | — | | 17 | 0 |
| Doxa | 2016–17 | Cypriot First Division | 28 | 4 | 4 | 0 | — | | — | | — | | 32 | 4 |
| Doxa | 2017–18 | Cypriot First Division | 7 | 2 | 0 | 0 | — | | — | | — | | 7 | 2 |
| Doxa | Total | | 35 | 6 | 4 | 0 | — | | — | | — | | 39 | 6 |
| Melaka United | 2018 | Malaysia Super League | 12 | 1 | 2 | 0 | — | | — | | — | | 14 | 1 |
| Career total | | | 352 | 29 | 30 | 1 | 2 | 0 | 23 | 0 | 4 | 0 | 411 | 29 |

== Honours ==
APOEL

- Cypriot First Division: 2013–14, 2014–15
- Cypriot Cup: 2013–14, 2014–15
- Cypriot Super Cup: 2013
