= David Cortés (Spanish footballer) =

Spanish footballer (born 1979)

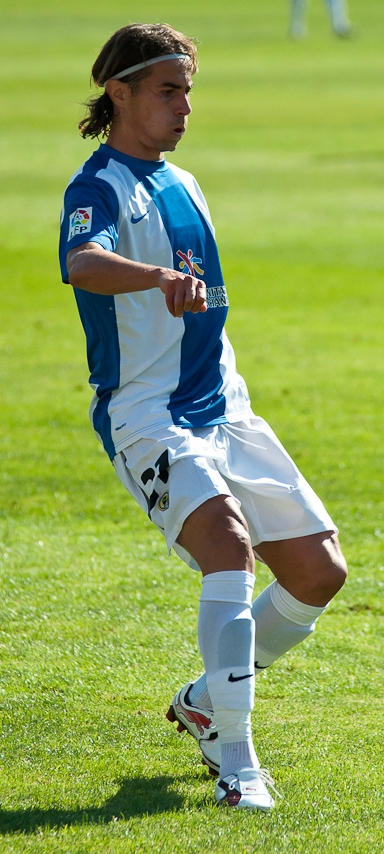
- Cortés in action for Hércules in 2011

Personal information
- Full name: David Cortés Caballero
- Date of birth: 29 August 1979 (age 47)
- Place of birth: Llerena, Spain
- Height: 1.81 m (5 ft 11 in)
- Position: Right-back

Youth career
- Extremadura

Senior career*
Years	Team	Apps	(Gls)
1998–1999	Extremadura B		
1999–2002	Extremadura	83	(1)
2000	→ Baeza (loan)		
2002–2006	Mallorca	123	(0)
2006–2010	Getafe	106	(0)
2010–2011	Hércules	34	(0)
2011–2012	Granada	10	(0)
2013	Hércules	19	(0)
2013–2014	Zaragoza	24	(0)
2014–2015	Aarhus	21	(0)
Total		420	(1)
- * Club domestic league appearances and goals

David Cortés Caballero (born 29 August 1979) is a Spanish former professional footballer who played as a right-back.

He appeared in 273 La Liga matches in ten seasons, mainly with Mallorca and Getafe (four years apiece). He won the 2002–03 Copa del Rey with the former club.

== Club career ==
Born in Llerena, Badajoz, Cortés made his professional debut with local CF Extremadura in the Segunda División. He then moved to RCD Mallorca in La Liga (alongside teammate Poli), where he was first-choice for three full seasons, helping the Balearic Islands team to the 2002–03 edition of the Copa del Rey.

In summer 2006, Cortés signed with Madrid's Getafe CF. After splitting duties with Romanian Cosmin Contra in 2006–07, he started the following campaign as the side reached the quarter-finals of the UEFA Cup.

In 2009–10, with Contra already gone, Cortés was greatly overshadowed by new signing Miguel Torres, but still contributed 20 league matches as Getafe qualified for the second time in the club's history to the Europa League. In July 2010, at almost 31, he signed a one-year contract with Hércules CF, returned to the top flight after a 13-year absence.

Cortés was the undisputed first-choice right-back during his only season with the Valencians, who finished 19th and were immediately relegated. In mid-July 2011, he joined Granada CF also from the top division on a two-year deal.

From 2012 to 2014, Cortés competed in the second tier with Hércules and Real Zaragoza. On 15 September 2014, at already 35, he moved abroad for the first time, signing with Danish 1st Division side Aarhus Gymnastikforening for one year and retiring after helping them to win promotion.

== Honours ==
Mallorca

- Copa del Rey: 2002–03
