= Sendoa Agirre =

Spanish footballer

Sendoa
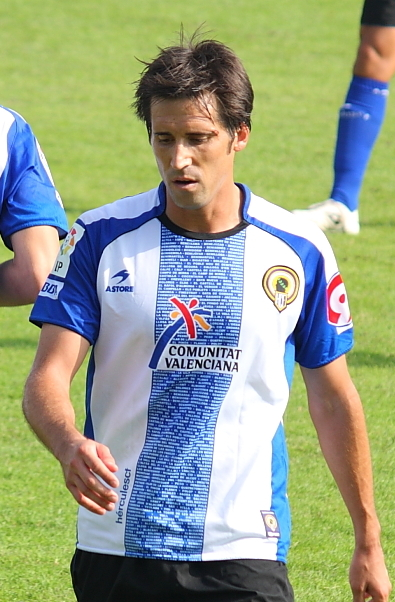
- Sendoa warming up with Hércules in 2009

Personal information
- Full name: Sendoa Agirre Basterretxea
- Date of birth: 31 December 1975 (age 50)
- Place of birth: Bilbao, Spain
- Height: 1.76 m (5 ft 9 in)
- Position: Attacking midfielder

Youth career
- Romo
- Athletic Bilbao

Senior career*
Years	Team	Apps	(Gls)
1994–2001	Bilbao Athletic	56	(18)
1994–1995	→ Sondika (loan)		
1995–1996	→ Balmaseda (loan)		
1996–1997	→ Zorroza (loan)		
1997–1998	→ Gernika (loan)	37	(13)
2000–2001	→ Eibar (loan)	17	(1)
2001–2002	Barakaldo	42	(18)
2002–2006	Alicante	150	(60)
2006–2011	Hércules	165	(28)
2011–2013	Alavés	69	(17)
- * Club domestic league appearances and goals

Sendoa Agirre Basterretxea (born 31 December 1975), known simply as Sendoa, is a Spanish former professional footballer who played as an attacking midfielder.

== Club career ==
Sendoa was born in Bilbao, Biscay. After finishing his development at Basque giants Athletic Bilbao, he spent several years competing at amateur level in the region, on loan. He returned to the first team in 1998, but only appeared for them during preseason under Luis Fernández, going on to exclusively represent the reserves.

Aged nearly 25, Sendoa had his first taste of professional football, playing one season with SD Eibar in the Segunda División. He moved immediately after to Segunda División B with neighbouring Barakaldo CF.

Sendoa helped Barakaldo reach the 2002 Segunda División B play-offs, but despite his goals the club failed to achieve promotion. In the following four years he represented third division club Alicante CF, finishing twice in the top-three but never promoting in the playoffs.

Sendoa signed with second-tier side Hércules CF for the 2006–07 campaign. He was an undisputed starter from early on, contributing three goals in 39 games (almost 3,000 minutes) in his fourth year as the Valencians returned to La Liga after a 13-year absence.

On 28 August 2010, Sendoa appeared in the 2010–11 opener, a 0–1 home loss against Athletic Bilbao, thus becoming the oldest rookie in the history of the Spanish first division (aged 34 years, 8 months). On 7 May of the following year, he scored his first goal in the competition as Hércules fell 2–3 at home to Racing de Santander and were finally relegated. He added a brace in the following fixture, a 2–2 home draw with RCD Mallorca, which certified the team's fate. He finished his playing career with a two-year spell at Deportivo Alavés, helping the club to achieve promotion from the third tier in 2012–13.

In July 2019, Sendoa was named as Athletic Bilbao's match delegate, an administrative role which he had performed for the previous four seasons at Alavés; he replaced Andoni Imaz.
