= 2008–09 Segunda División =

78th season of the second-tier football league in Spain

Segunda División
- Season: 2008–09
- Champions: Xerez
- Promoted: Xerez; Real Zaragoza; Tenerife
- Relegated: Alavés; Alicante; Eibar; Sevilla Atlético
- Matches: 462
- Goals: 1,160 (2.51 per match)
- Top goalscorer: (Spain) Nino

The 2008–09 Segunda División season (known from that season as Liga Adelante for sponsorship reasons) was the 78th since its establishment. The first matches of the season were played on 30 August 2008, and the season ended on 21 June 2009. Real Zaragoza, Real Murcia and Levante were the teams relegated from La Liga the previous season. Alicante, Girona, Huesca and Rayo Vallecano were the teams promoted from Segunda División B the previous season.

The first goal of the season was scored by Alexandre Geijo, who scored in the 11th minute for Levante against Real Zaragoza in the early kick-off. The first red card of the season was given to Paco Peña from Real Murcia after a challenge on Sergio Pachón in their opening match against Rayo Vallecano. The first hat-trick was scored by Sebastián Abreu in the match between Xerez and Real Sociedad.

== Teams ==
Location of teams in Segunda División 2008–09
Canary Islands

The 2008–09 Segunda División was made up of the following teams:

Team	Home city	Stadium	Capacity
Alavés	Vitoria-Gasteiz	Mendizorrotza	19,840
Albacete	Albacete	Carlos Belmonte	17,500
Alicante	Alicante	José Rico Pérez	29,500
Castellón	Castellón	Nou Estadi Castàlia	14,485
Celta Vigo	Vigo	Balaídos	31,800
Córdoba	Córdoba	Nuevo Arcángel	18,280
Eibar	Eibar	Ipurua	6,267
Elche	Elche	Martínez Valero	36,017
Gimnàstic	Tarragona	Nou Estadi	14,500
Girona	Girona	Montilivi	9,500
Hércules	Alicante	José Rico Pérez	29,500
Huesca	Huesca	El Alcoraz	5,300
Las Palmas	Las Palmas de Gran Canaria	Gran Canaria	31,250
Levante	Valencia	Ciutat de València	26,354
Rayo Vallecano	Madrid	Teresa Rivero	15,500
Real Murcia	Murcia	Nueva Condomina	31,179
Real Sociedad	San Sebastián	Anoeta	39,500
Salamanca	Villares de la Reina	El Helmántico	17,341
Sevilla Atlético	Seville	Ramón Sánchez Pizjuán	42,714
Tenerife	Santa Cruz de Tenerife	Heliodoro Rodríguez López	22,824
Xerez	Jerez de la Frontera	Chapín	20,523
Zaragoza	Zaragoza	La Romareda	33,608

== League table ==
Pos	Team	Pld	W	D	L	GF	GA	GD	Pts	Promotion or relegation
1	Xerez (C, P)	42	24	10	8	73	42	+31	82	Promotion to La Liga
2	Zaragoza (P)	42	23	12	7	79	42	+37	81 (Note: TEN 1–2 ZAR; ZAR 1–1 TEN)	Promotion to La Liga
3	Tenerife (P)	42	24	9	9	79	47	+32	81	Promotion to La Liga
4	Hércules	42	21	15	6	82	43	+39	78	
5	Rayo Vallecano	42	18	16	8	55	39	+16	70	
6	Real Sociedad	42	17	16	9	48	38	+10	67	
7	Castellón	42	17	14	11	55	42	+13	65	
8	Levante	42	18	10	14	59	59	0	64	
9	Salamanca	42	16	12	14	59	50	+9	60	
10	Gimnàstic	42	14	15	13	60	50	+10	57	
11	Huesca	42	13	14	15	47	46	+1	53 (Note: HUE: 7 pts; ELC: 5 pts; CÓR: 4 pts)	
12	Elche	42	13	14	15	52	50	+2	53	
13	Córdoba	42	14	11	17	47	54	−7	53	
14	Murcia	42	14	10	18	48	58	−10	52	
15	Albacete	42	13	12	17	42	54	−12	51	
16	Girona	42	11	16	15	43	54	−11	49	
17	Celta de Vigo	42	10	18	14	46	56	−10	48	
18	Las Palmas	42	10	17	15	46	51	−5	47	
19	Alavés (R)	42	11	10	21	42	64	−22	43	Relegation to Segunda División B
20	Alicante (R)	42	8	11	23	38	69	−31	35 (Note: ALI 3–1 EIB; EIB 1–2 ALI)	Relegation to Segunda División B
21	Eibar (R)	42	8	11	23	31	63	−32	35	Relegation to Segunda División B
22	Sevilla Atlético (R)	42	2	13	27	29	89	−60	19	Relegation to Segunda División B

Source: LFP – Liga Adelante
Rules for classification: 1st points; 2nd head-to-head points; 3rd head-to-head goal difference; 4th head-to-head goals scored; 5th goal difference; 6th number of goals scored; 7th Fair-play points
(C) Champions; (P) Promoted; (R) Relegated

== Results ==
Home \ Away	ALA	ALB	ALI	CAS	CDV	CÓR	EIB	ELC	GIM	GIR	HÉR	HUE	LPA	LEV	MUR	RVA	RSO	SAL	SAT	TEN	XER	ZAR
Alavés	—	0–2	1–0	0–1	1–2	1–0	1–1	0–3	1–1	1–0	1–3	3–0	2–1	2–2	4–1	0–2	2–1	1–1	2–2	1–2	1–2	2–2
Albacete	1–0	—	0–2	2–0	1–1	1–1	2–0	2–1	3–2	1–1	0–3	0–2	1–0	0–1	0–0	2–1	2–1	2–2	2–1	0–1	0–2	1–1
Alicante	0–2	1–2	—	0–0	2–2	2–2	3–1	0–3	1–3	1–1	1–2	1–3	1–2	0–2	0–2	2–0	1–2	0–0	3–3	2–2	0–1	0–3
Castellón	0–1	1–0	2–0	—	2–0	1–1	4–0	2–2	2–1	1–2	0–0	1–1	1–1	4–1	2–0	0–0	0–3	2–0	3–0	2–2	2–2	1–1
Celta de Vigo	2–1	0–0	2–2	1–2	—	1–0	1–2	2–2	0–2	0–1	2–1	0–1	0–1	2–2	2–2	0–0	0–0	2–0	2–0	2–1	1–1	2–0
Córdoba	3–0	1–0	2–1	2–1	3–4	—	1–1	1–1	0–0	2–0	0–3	1–0	4–1	3–1	2–1	0–1	2–2	0–2	1–1	2–0	1–2	1–0
Eibar	1–0	1–1	1–2	0–1	0–0	1–0	—	1–2	1–0	2–2	0–1	2–0	1–2	0–0	3–1	0–1	1–1	1–2	2–2	3–2	1–1	2–3
Elche	1–0	0–0	0–0	0–1	1–1	3–1	0–1	—	2–0	2–1	2–2	2–2	1–1	0–2	1–1	2–0	1–2	3–1	2–0	2–4	0–1	2–0
Gimnàstic	1–1	1–0	1–1	0–1	1–1	2–2	2–0	2–0	—	3–0	2–2	1–1	0–0	2–0	3–0	3–1	1–2	2–0	3–1	0–1	2–1	0–0
Girona	0–1	3–3	3–0	1–0	2–2	1–1	2–0	1–1	2–1	—	1–0	2–0	2–2	0–0	1–0	1–1	0–0	0–1	1–0	0–1	0–2	1–0
Hércules	3–0	4–1	1–2	0–0	2–2	1–0	2–0	0–0	2–2	3–0	—	3–2	4–2	4–2	3–2	1–1	1–1	2–2	8–0	3–1	0–0	2–1
Huesca	2–0	1–2	0–1	2–2	0–0	3–1	2–0	3–2	3–2	3–1	0–0	—	2–1	2–1	1–0	0–1	1–2	0–0	3–0	0–0	1–1	0–1
Las Palmas	2–1	3–0	0–1	1–0	2–0	0–0	1–0	2–0	2–2	2–2	1–1	1–1	—	1–2	0–1	0–0	0–1	1–1	2–0	0–1	2–3	2–2
Levante	2–3	3–1	2–0	3–1	1–3	3–0	2–0	2–0	2–2	1–1	0–2	1–0	2–2	—	2–1	1–0	0–2	1–2	2–0	2–1	2–2	2–1
Murcia	1–0	1–0	3–1	2–2	1–0	1–0	2–0	1–0	1–1	2–0	0–0	0–0	0–0	1–2	—	0–1	2–0	2–1	1–0	2–2	1–2	1–4
Rayo Vallecano	2–1	0–3	0–0	4–2	4–1	5–0	4–1	1–2	3–2	1–1	1–0	1–0	1–1	0–0	1–0	—	4–1	1–1	1–0	0–0	3–3	2–2
Real Sociedad	1–1	1–0	1–0	2–3	2–2	0–2	0–0	0–0	0–0	2–0	1–2	1–0	1–0	1–1	2–0	1–1	—	1–0	1–0	1–2	0–0	1–1
Salamanca	0–0	3–1	2–0	1–0	2–1	1–0	2–0	1–1	4–0	2–2	1–5	2–0	2–2	3–0	2–3	0–1	0–1	—	6–0	1–2	2–1	1–3
Sevilla Atlético	1–1	1–1	2–3	0–2	0–0	0–2	0–0	0–2	1–3	2–1	1–2	1–1	2–2	1–2	3–3	0–0	1–0	1–1	—	0–4	1–2	0–4
Tenerife	3–0	1–1	3–1	1–2	3–0	2–0	2–0	3–2	3–2	4–1	3–2	1–1	2–0	5–1	3–1	2–0	1–1	2–3	2–1	—	2–0	1–2
Xerez	5–0	2–1	2–0	1–0	2–0	0–1	3–0	3–1	1–2	2–2	3–0	2–1	1–0	2–0	5–3	1–1	1–3	2–1	2–0	2–0	—	1–2
Zaragoza	4–2	3–0	3–0	1–1	3–0	3–1	3–0	2–0	1–0	1–0	2–2	2–2	2–0	2–1	2–1	2–3	2–2	1–0	4–0	1–1	2–1	—

Source: BDFutbol
Legend: Blue = home team win; Yellow = draw; Red = away team win.

== Pichichi Trophy for Top Goalscorers ==
Last updated 21 June 2009

Goalscorers	Goals	Penalties	Team
(Spain) Nino	29	4	Tenerife
(Brazil) Ewerthon	28	5	Real Zaragoza
(Spain) Marcos Márquez	21	7	Las Palmas
(Spain) Alejandro Alfaro	20	0	Tenerife
(Spain) Momo	17	3	Xerez
(Argentina) Leonardo Ulloa	16	2	Castellón
(Venezuela) Miku	15	2	Salamanca
(Spain) Rubén Navarro	15	1	Hércules
(Spain) Rubén Castro	14	3	Huesca
(Spain) Víctor	14	2	Gimnàstic de Tarragona

== Zamora Trophy for Top Goalkeepers ==
Last updated 21 June 2009

Goalkeeper	Goals	Matches	Average	Team
(Spain) David Cobeño	35	40	0.88	Rayo Vallecano
(Chile) Claudio Bravo	28	32	0.88	Real Sociedad
(Spain) Chema	41	41	1	Xerez
(Spain) Carlos Sánchez	34	34	1	Castellón
(Spain) Alberto Cifuentes	34	33	1.03	Salamanca
(Spain) Juan Calatayud	42	40	1.05	Hércules
(Spain) Eduardo Navarro	39	36	1.08	Huesca
(Argentina) Willy Caballero	40	36	1.11	Elche
(Spain) Rubén Pérez	38	33	1.15	Gimnàstic de Tarragona
(Spain) Roberto Santamaría	45	39	1.15	Las Palmas

== Season statistics ==
=== Scoring ===
- First goal of the season: Alexandre Geijo for Levante against Real Zaragoza (30 August 2008)
- Fastest goal in a match: 14 seconds – Sergio Rodríguez for Real Sociedad against Alavés (27 September 2008)
- Goal scored at the latest point in a match: 90+8 minutes – Alexandre Geijo for Levante UD against Albacete Balompié (6 December 2008)
- Widest winning margin: 8 – Hércules 8–0 Sevilla Atlético (5 April 2009)
- Most goals in a match: 8
  - Xerez 5–3 Real Murcia (2 November 2008)
  - Hércules 8–0 Sevilla Atlético (5 April 2009)
- First hat-trick of the season: Sebastián Abreu for Real Sociedad against Xerez (14 March 2009)
- First own goal of the season: Ricardo Cavas for Xerez against Valicante (30 August 2008)
- Most goals by one player in a single match: 3
  - Sebastián Abreu for Real Sociedad against Xerez (14 March 2009)
  - Rubén Navarro for Hércules against Sevilla Atlético (5 April 2009)
  - Leonardo Ulloa for Castellón against Eibar (14 June 2009)
- Most goals by one team in a match: 8 – Hércules 8–0 Sevilla Atlético (5 April 2009)
- Most goals in one half by one team: 5 – Xerez 5–3 Real Murcia (2 November 2008)
- Most goals scored by losing team: 3
  - Xerez 5–3 Real Murcia (2 November 2008)
  - Córdoba 3–4 Celta Vigo (8 November 2008)

=== Cards ===
- First yellow card: Lillo for Real Murcia against Rayo Vallecano (30 August 2008)
- First red card: Paco Peña for Real Murcia against Rayo Vallecano (30 August 2008).

== Teams by autonomous community ==
	Autonomous community	Number of teams	Teams
1	Valencia	5	Alicante, Castellón, Elche, Hércules and Levante
2	Andalusia	3	Córdoba, Sevilla Atlético and Xerez
2	Basque Country	3	Alavés, Eibar and Real Sociedad
4	Aragon	2	Huesca and Zaragoza
4	Canary Islands	2	Las Palmas and Tenerife
4	Catalonia	2	Gimnàstic and Girona
7	Castile-La Mancha	1	Albacete
7	Castile and León	1	Salamanca
7	Galicia	1	Celta
7	Madrid	1	Rayo Vallecano
7	Murcia	1	Murcia
