= Matías Fritzler =

Argentine footballer

Personal information
- Full name: Matías Lionel Fritzler
- Date of birth: 23 August 1986 (age 40)
- Place of birth: Lomas de Zamora, Buenos Aires, Argentina
- Height: 1.79 m (5 ft 10 in)
- Position: Midfielder

Youth career
- Lanús

Senior career*
Years	Team	Apps	(Gls)
2004–2013	Lanús	150	(8)
2010–2011	→ Hércules (loan)	26	(0)
2013–2015	Kasımpaşa	14	(0)
2015–2016	Lanús	26	(0)
2016–2017	Huracán	40	(1)
2017–2020	Colón	56	(2)
2020–2021	Danubio	37	(0)
2022	Agropecuario	34	(0)
- * Club domestic league appearances and goals

Matías Lionel Fritzler (born 23 August 1986) is an Argentine former professional footballer who played as a midfielder.

== Career ==
Fritzler is of German descent. He started his professional in 2004 with Lanús. He went on to establish himself as an important member of the first team and, in 2007, was part of the squad that won the 2007 Apertura tournament, Lanús' first ever top flight league title.

During the 2010–11 La Liga season, he played on loan for Hércules CF. Subsequently, he returned to Lanús for the 2011–12 Argentine Primera División season.

== Honours ==
Lanús

- Argentine Primera División (1): 2007 Apertura
