= Juanra (footballer, born 1980) =

Spanish footballer

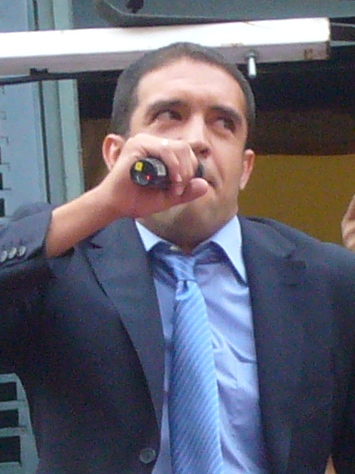
- Juanra Cabrero (2010)

Personal information
- Full name: Juan Ramón Cabrero Obrer
- Date of birth: 24 April 1980 (age 46)
- Place of birth: Estivella, Spain
- Height: 1.83 m (6 ft 0 in)
- Position: Right back

Youth career
- Levante

Senior career*
Years	Team	Apps	(Gls)
1999–2006	Levante B	75	(4)
2000–2006	Levante	48	(0)
2006–2009	Numancia	97	(0)
2009–2013	Hércules	91	(0)
2014–2016	Castellón	64	(2)
2016–2018	Acero		
2018–2019	Soneja		
- * Club domestic league appearances and goals as of 26 June 2016

Juan Ramón Cabrero Obrer (born 24 April 1980), commonly known as Juanra, is a Spanish former professional footballer who played as a right back.

== Football career ==
Born in Estivella, Valencian Community, Juanra played his first five professional seasons with local Levante UD. He never managed however to appear for them in La Liga, alternating between the first and the second teams, the latter of which competed in the lower leagues.

For 2006–07, Juanra moved to CD Numancia of the second division, going on to establish himself as first-choice during a three-year spell. On 25 June 2009, after suffering relegation from the top level, the 29-year-old signed for Hércules CF also in his native region, playing in 38 games in his debut campaign as the club returned to the top flight after 13 years.
