= Olivier Thomert =

French former professional footballer (born 1980)

Personal information
- Full name: Olivier Thomert
- Date of birth: 28 May 1980 (age 46)
- Place of birth: Versailles, France
- Height: 1.85 m (6 ft 1 in)
- Position: Winger

Team information
- Current team: Claye Souilly Sports

Senior career*
Years	Team	Apps	(Gls)
1999–2002	Le Mans	43	(6)
2002–2007	Lens	134	(19)
2007–2010	Rennes	61	(9)
2010	Le Mans	4	(0)
2010–2011	Hércules	18	(1)
2012–2013	Le Mans	15	(2)
2013	Portland Timbers 2	1	(0)
2019–	Claye Souilly Sports		
Total		276	(37)

International career
2013	Martinique	3	(0)
- * Club domestic league appearances and goals

Olivier Thomert (born 28 May 1980) is a former professional footballer who played as a winger who currently plays for French amateur club Claye Souilly Sports.

He made nearly 200 appearances in the top flight of French football.

== Career ==
He started his career at Le Mans, and had spells at Lens, Rennes and Hércules. He rejoined Le Mans on 1 August 2012 for a third spell with the club.

In August 2019, Thomert came out of his retirement, after working as a youth coach for some years. He signed for Regional 2 club Claye Souilly Sports.

== Honours ==
Lens

- UEFA Intertoto Cup: 2005
