= Tony Mendes =

American bull rider

Personal information
- Full name: Tony Mendes
- Born: August 10, 1977 (age 49) Reno, Nevada, U.S.
- Height: 5 ft 10 in (1.78 m) (2019)
- Weight: 170 lb (77 kg) (2019)

Sport
- Sport: Rodeo
- Event: Bull riding
- Turned pro: 1996
- Retired: 2015

Achievements and titles
- Highest world ranking: 1996 PRCA Bull Riding Rookie of the Year

Tony Mendes (born August 10, 1977) is an American former professional rodeo cowboy who specialized in bull riding.

== Background ==
Mendes was born in Reno, Nevada, on August 10, 1977. He continued to live in Reno and then in Jensen, Utah. He is the younger brother of Scott Mendes, who was the 1997 PRCA World Champion bull rider, and a co-founder of the PBR. Tony started riding at age three on top of a sheep. Over the years, he progressed from sheep to calves and steers, before climbing on his first bull at age 14. Tony was recorded to be 5' 10", and 170 pounds during competition.

== Career ==
Tony was the 1996 Professional Rodeo Cowboys Association (PRCA) Bull Riding Rookie of the Year, as well as the 1996 PRCA Wilderness Circuit Champion bull rider. He competed in said organization in 1996, 1998 to 1999, 2008 to 2009, 2011 and 2012. He also competed in the Bull Riders Only (BRO), Professional Bull Riders (PBR), and Championship Bull Riding (CBR) circuits. He qualified for his first PBR World Finals in 1999 and recorded a 93.5 score atop the 1900-pound Clayton's Pet of Double J Rodeo Palace in the short-go. He was often referred to as the "Wild Man" because of the energy he displayed.

Tony qualified for the PRCA's National Finals Rodeo twice (1998 & 1999) and the PBR World Finals eight times (1999 to 2005, 2007). His brother Scott also qualified for the PBR World Finals in 1994 and 2001, the latter case marking the only time that both brothers qualified for a world championship event together. Tony also qualified for the CBR World Finals in 2012.

Tony's last professional bull-riding out was at the PBR Velocity Tour event in Portland, Oregon, on February 28, 2015.

== Personal life ==
On January 2, 2008, Tony was featured on the CBS game show Power of 10. He was defeated without winning any money. He was featured in Bullrider, a documentary by Josh Aronson. Mendes is married to Jessica Blasdel-Mendes, together they have 6 children and 3 grandchildren. The Mendes' reside in Fruita, Colorado, as of 2019.

== Sources ==
- PRCA Awards. Professional Rodeo Cowboys Association.
