= Antonio Méndez =

Spanish footballer and manager

Personal information
- Full name: Antonio Méndez Méndez
- Date of birth: 7 February 1970 (age 56)
- Place of birth: Seville, Spain
- Height: 1.86 m (6 ft 1 in)
- Position: Midfielder

Senior career*
Years	Team	Apps	(Gls)
1991–1992	Los Palacios		
1992–1993	Recreativo	45	(7)
1993–1997	Cádiz	93	(11)
1997–1998	Xerez	40	(3)
1998–2000	Recreativo	59	(6)
2000–2003	Murcia	63	(3)
2003	Torredonjimeno	17	(1)
2003–2004	Écija	29	(0)
Total		346	(31)

Managerial career
- 2004–2009: Xerez (assistant)
- 2007: Xerez (caretaker)
- 2009–2011: Hércules (assistant)
- 2012: Almería (assistant)
- 2012–2013: Xerez (assistant)
- 2016–2017: San Fernando
- 2018: Ibiza
- * Club domestic league appearances and goals

Antonio Méndez Méndez (born 7 February 1970) is a Spanish retired footballer who played mainly as a right midfielder, and a current manager.

== Playing career ==
Méndez was born in Seville. He was often nicknamed Ñoño during his career, and played mostly in his native Andalusia during a 13-year professional career, starting with lowly UD Los Palacios in 1991.

Méndez competed six seasons in Segunda División, five consecutive, his first spell at that level being with Cádiz CF in 1993–94 (19 games, no goals, team relegation). He also represented in the competition Xerez CD, Recreativo de Huelva and Real Murcia for a total of 181 matches and 12 goals; he retired in June 2004 at the age of 34, after one season in Segunda División B with Écija Balompié.

== Coaching career ==
Méndez began working as a manager immediately after retiring, being an assistant under several coaches at his former club Xerez. On 3 November 2007, prior to the arrival of Casuco, he was in charge of the team for one division two game, a 1–2 away loss against Cádiz.

On 30 June 2009, Méndez joined former Xerez boss Esteban Vigo as he signed with fellow second tier side Hércules CF. The pair remained in the position until March 2011, and returned to Xerez in August of the following year.

Méndez first experience as a head coach arrived midway through 2015–16, at the helm of San Fernando CD in the Tercera División. He renewed his contract for one year after achieving promotion and, after leading the team to safety the following campaign, left.

In the summer of 2018, Méndez was appointed at UD Ibiza.
