= Miguel Aracil =

Spanish footballer

Personal information
- Full name: Miguel Aracil Arnau
- Date of birth: 18 February 1957 (age 69)
- Place of birth: Alicante, Spain
- Height: 1.74 m (5 ft 8 1/2 in)
- Positions: Right back; midfielder

Youth career
- Hércules

Senior career*
Years	Team	Apps	(Gls)
1976–1983	Hércules	227	(9)
1983–1986	Valladolid	56	(1)
1986–1988	Hércules	11	(0)
Total		294	(10)

International career
1977	Spain U21	1	(0)
1980	Spain U23	2	(0)
1979–1980	Spain amateur	4	(0)
- * Club domestic league appearances and goals

Miguel Aracil Arnau (born 18 February 1957 in Alicante, Valencian Community) is a Spanish retired footballer who played as a right defender and midfielder.

Aracil spent eleven seasons playing professional football with Hércules CF, captaining the side through its most successful period during the 1970s and 1980s. In 1984, Aracil won the Copa de la Liga with Real Valladolid.

After he retired from playing, Aracil became a football coach. He worked in Hércules' youth and second teams until 2013.

== Honours ==
Valladolid

- Copa de la Liga: 1983–84
