= Noé Pamarot =

French footballer (born 1979)

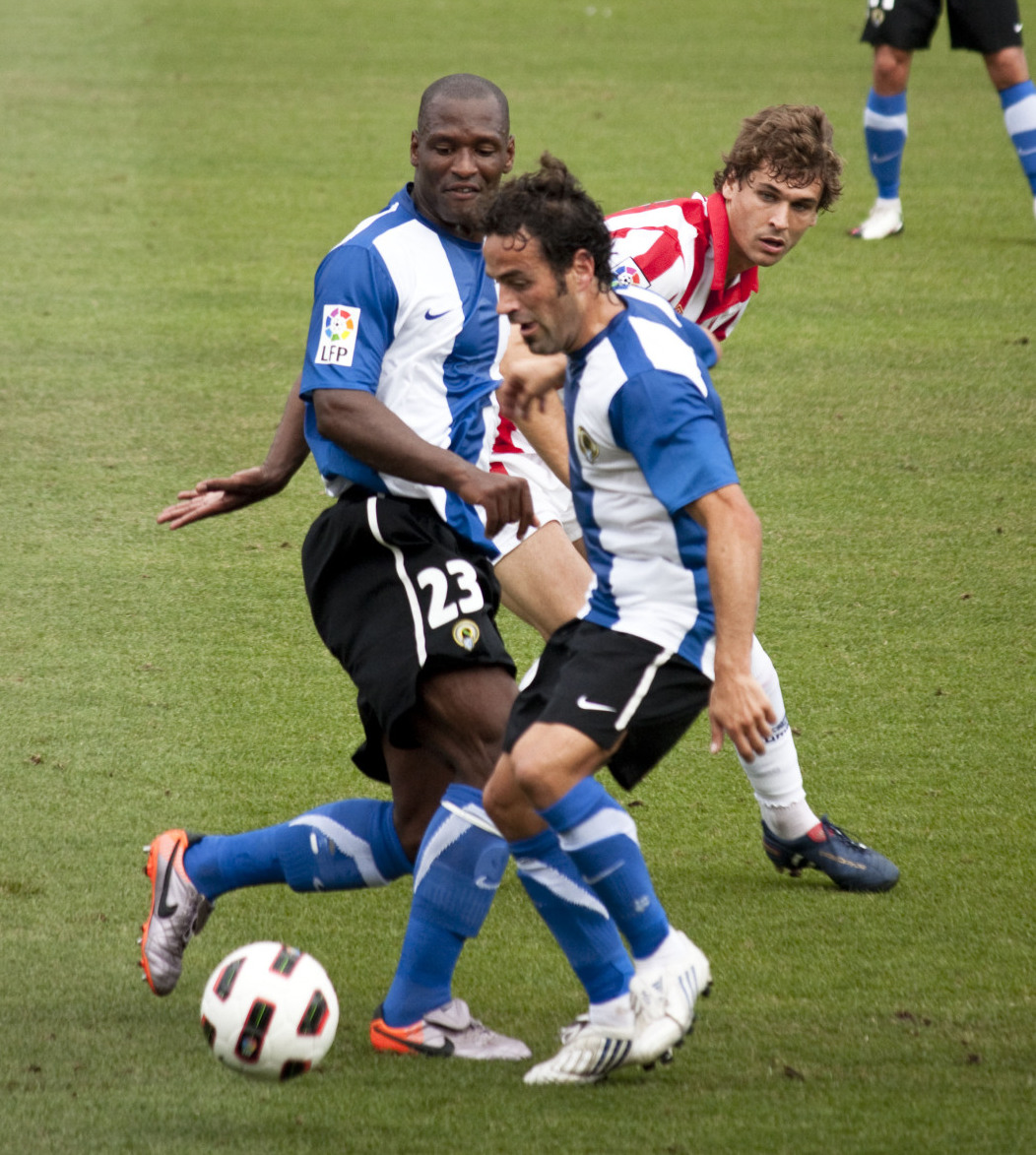

Personal information
- Full name: Noé Elias Pamarot
- Date of birth: 14 April 1979 (age 47)
- Place of birth: Fontenay-sous-Bois, France
- Height: 1.80 m (5 ft 11 in)
- Position: Centre back

Senior career*
Years	Team	Apps	(Gls)
1997–1999	Martigues	51	(2)
1999–2004	Nice	123	(6)
1999–2000	→ Portsmouth (loan)	2	(0)
2004–2006	Tottenham Hotspur	25	(1)
2006–2009	Portsmouth	65	(3)
2009–2011	Hércules	36	(0)
2011–2012	Granada	2	(0)
2013–2014	Hércules	50	(4)
Total		354	(16)
- * Club domestic league appearances and goals

Noé Elias Pamarot (born 14 April 1979) is a French former professional footballer who played as a central defender. Before moving to Spain, Pamarot played for Portsmouth in the Premier League. He is a right-footed defender who is also known for his great strength. Pamarot has previously played for Martigues, Nice and Tottenham Hotspur and also had a brief loan spell at Portsmouth in the 1999–2000 season.

== Club career ==
=== Tottenham Hotspur ===
In the 2004–05 season he played 23 times for Tottenham Hotspur before seriously injuring his right knee at the start of April in a match against Birmingham City at St Andrew's. Before that he headed the winning goal away at Everton, one of his two goals for the club, the other coming in the FA Cup against Nottingham Forest.

=== Portsmouth ===
Pamarot was transferred from Tottenham to Portsmouth in January 2006 in a £7.5 million deal that also took Sean Davis and Pedro Mendes to Portsmouth. He scored his first Portsmouth goal away against Arsenal in December 2006. Matthew Taylor's free kick was headed on by David Thompson and rebounded off the post into the path of Pamarot. He scored again in the next game, with another header, in a 3–1 home win over Sheffield United. Pamarot subsequently scored a brace of goals against Leeds United in the League Cup in 2007, as well as a 30-yard strike against Newcastle United in the Premier League. He was an unused substitute as Portsmouth won the 2008 FA Cup final. His only contribution to the victorious campaign was playing the full 90 minutes of their fourth round win over Plymouth Argyle.

Pamarot was released by Portsmouth following the expiration of his contract in the summer of 2009.

=== Hércules ===
On 28 August 2009, Pamarot signed for the Spanish team Hércules on an initial two-year contract. Pamarot was the undisputed first-choice center-back during his first season with the Valencian, who finished 19th and were immediately relegated back. In mid-July 2011, he signed with another top-division club, Granada CF. Pamarot only played twice for Granada and returned to Hércules to play out the rest of his career in the Segunda División. Pamarot made another 50 appearances for the club before retiring.

== Career statistics ==
Club	Season	Division	League		FA Cup		League Cup		Other		Total	
Club	Season	Division	Apps	Goals	Apps	Goals	Apps	Goals	Apps	Goals	Apps	Goals
Martigues	1997–98	Division 2	25	2	0	0	2	0	0	0	27	2
Martigues	1998–99	Championnat National	26	0	0	0	1	0	0	0	27	0
Total			51	2	0	0	3	0	0		54	2
Nice	1999–2000	Division 2	0	0	0	0	0	0	0	0	0	0
Nice	2000–01	Division 2	22	0	0	0	1	0	0	0	23	0
Nice	2001–02	Division 2	33	3	3	0	1	0	0	0	37	3
Nice	2002–03	Division 1	33	1	1	0	1	0	0	0	35	1
Nice	2003–04	Division 1	33	2	2	0	3	0	4 (Note: Appearance(s) in UEFA Intertoto Cup)	1	42	3
Nice	2004–05	Division 1	2	0	0	0	0	0	2	0	4	0
Total			123	6	6	0	6	0	6	1	141	7
→Portsmouth (loan)	1999–2000	Division One	2	0	0	0	1	0	0	0	3	0
Total			2	0	0	0	1	0	0	0	3	0
Tottenham Hotspur	2004–05	Premier League	23	1	2	1	3	0	0	0	28	2
Tottenham Hotspur	2005–06	Premier League	2	0	0	0	0	0	0	0	2	0
Total			25	1	2	1	3	0	0	0	30	2
Portsmouth	2005–06	Premier League	8	0	0	0	0	0	0	0	8	0
Portsmouth	2006–07	Premier League	23	2	0	0	2	0	0	0	25	2
Portsmouth	2007–08	Premier League	18	1	1	0	3	2	0	0	22	3
Portsmouth	2008–09	Premier League	16	0	1	0	1	0	4 (Note: Appearance(s) in UEFA Cup)	0	22	0
Total			65	3	2	0	6	2	4	0	77	5
Hércules	2009–10	Segunda Division	7	0	5	0	0	0	0	0	12	0
Hércules	2010–11	La Liga	29	0	1	0	0	0	0	0	30	0
Total			36	0	6	0	0	0	0	0	42	0
Granada	2011–12	La Liga	2	0	1	0	0	0	0	0	3	0
Total			2	0	1	0	0	0	0	0	3	0
Hércules	2012–13	Segunda Division	19	1	0	0	0	0	0	0	19	1
Hércules	2013–14	Segunda Division	31	3	0	0	0	0	0	0	31	3
Total			50	4	0	0	0	0	0	0	50	4
Career total			354	16	17	1	19	2	10	1	400	20

== Honours ==
Portsmouth

- FA Cup: 2007–08
