= Paco Peña (footballer) =

Spanish footballer (born 1978)

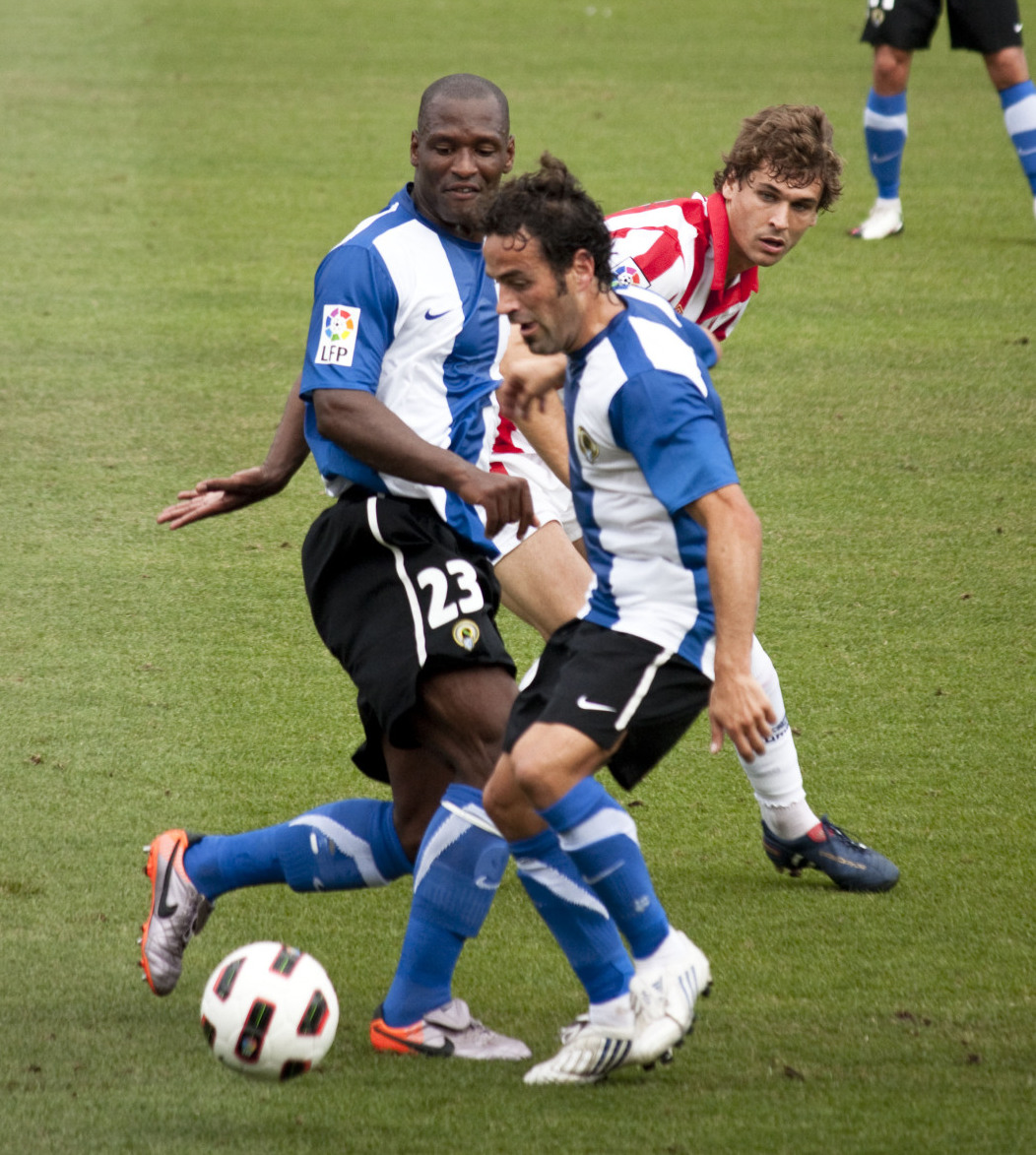
- Peña (foreground) controlling the ball for Hércules in 2010

Personal information
- Full name: Francisco Peña Romero
- Date of birth: 25 July 1978 (age 48)
- Place of birth: Jerez de los Caballeros, Spain
- Height: 1.70 m (5 ft 7 in)
- Position: Left-back

Youth career
- 1992–1997: Jerez

Senior career*
Years	Team	Apps	(Gls)
1997–1999	Jerez	18	(0)
1999–2002	Levante	73	(0)
2002–2006	Albacete	120	(1)
2006–2009	Murcia	108	(0)
2009–2018	Hércules	307	(5)
2018–2021	Intercity	70	(5)
Total		696	(11)
- * Club domestic league appearances and goals

Francisco "Paco" Peña Romero (born 25 July 1978) is a Spanish former professional footballer who played as a left-back.

He spent most of his extensive career with Hércules, playing 316 competitive matches while representing the club in all three major levels of Spanish football. He totalled 128 appearances in La Liga over four seasons, where he also played for Albacete and Murcia.

== Club career ==
Born in Jerez de los Caballeros, Extremadura, Peña started his career with local Jerez CF, for whom he appeared in the Segunda División B. During the 1999 January transfer window, he signed with Levante UD in the same league, contributing 15 appearances to an eventual promotion.

After a further three seasons with the club, Peña joined Albacete Balompié also in the Segunda División. He played 24 matches in 2002–03, and the latter side returned to La Liga through a third-place finish.

Peña made his debut in the Spanish top flight on 30 August 2003, playing the full 90 minutes in a 0–2 home loss against CA Osasuna. He was sent off in the next fixture at the Estadio Carlos Belmonte (2–1 defeat to FC Barcelona) and, at the end of the following campaign, again with him as an undisputed starter, his team was relegated.

In summer 2006, Peña moved to Real Murcia CF from the second tier. During his three-year tenure, he only missed a total of 14 games and also competed in the top division in 2007–08.

Aged 31, Peña signed with Hércules CF in 2009 off-season. He went on to remain connected with the Alicante-based club for nearly a decade, representing it in all three major levels of Spanish football and acting as captain. He scored his first competitive goal for them – and second as a professional – on 24 March 2013, in a 2–0 away win over CD Guadalajara.

Peña joined amateurs CF Intercity in 2018. He achieved two other promotions in a three-year spell and, at the end of his final season, was named their technical secretary.
