= 2010–11 La Liga =

80th season of La Liga

La Liga
- Season: 2010–11
- Dates: 28 August 2010 – 21 May 2011
- Champions: Barcelona; 21st title
- Relegated: Deportivo La Coruña; Hércules; Almería
- Champions League: Barcelona; Real Madrid; Valencia; Villarreal
- Europa League: Sevilla; Athletic Bilbao; Atlético Madrid
- Matches: 380
- Goals: 1,042 (2.74 per match)
- Top goalscorer: Cristiano Ronaldo (40 goals)
- Biggest home win: Real Madrid 7–0 Málaga (3 March 2011); Real Madrid 8–1 Almería (21 May 2011)
- Biggest away win: Almería 0–8 Barcelona (20 November 2010)
- Highest scoring: Valencia 3–6 Real Madrid (23 April 2011); Real Madrid 8–1 Almería (21 May 2011)
- Longest winning run: 16 matches Barcelona
- Longest unbeaten run: 31 matches Barcelona
- Longest winless run: 11 matches Sporting Gijón
- Longest losing run: 7 matches Almería
- Highest attendance: 98,000; Barcelona 5–0 Real Madrid (29 November 2010)
- Lowest attendance: 5,000; Almería 0–0 Villarreal (11 May 2011); Almería 3–1 Mallorca (15 May 2011)
- Average attendance: 29,099

The 2010–11 La Liga (known as the Liga BBVA for sponsorship reasons) was the 80th season of La Liga since its establishment. The campaign began on 28 August 2010, and concluded on 21 May 2011. A total of 20 teams contested the league, 17 of which already partook in the 2009–10 season, and three of which were promoted from the Segunda División. In addition, a new match ball – the Nike Total 90 Tracer – served as the official ball for all matches.

Defending champions Barcelona secured a third consecutive and overall 21st La Liga title following a 1–1 draw with Levante on 11 May 2011. The result gave Barcelona a six-point lead with two matches remaining which, combined with their superior head-to-head record against Real Madrid, ensured that they would finish top of the table. Barcelona led the table since defeating Real Madrid 5–0 on 23 November 2010. From that point onwards, they lost only one match en route to winning the title. Barcelona's Lionel Messi won La Liga's Award for Best Player for a third straight year.

The season was again dominated by Barcelona and Real Madrid, with second-place Madrid 21 points ahead of third-place Valencia. Having also faced off in the Champions League semi-finals and the Copa del Rey final, the top two rivals met four times over seventeen days, for a total of five meetings this season.

== Teams ==
Real Valladolid, CD Tenerife and Xerez CD were relegated to the Segunda División after finishing the 2009–10 season in the bottom three places. Tenerife and Xerez made their immediate return to the second level after just one year in the Spanish top flight, while Valladolid ended a three-year tenure in La Liga.

The relegated teams were replaced by 2009–10 Segunda División champions Real Sociedad from San Sebastián, runners-up Hércules CF from Alicante and Levante UD from Valencia. Hércules returned to the highest Spanish football league for the first time after 13 years, while Real Sociedad and Levante terminated their second-level status after three and two years, respectively.

=== Stadia and locations ===
Location of teams in La Liga 2010–11

Team	Club home city	Stadium	Capacity
Almería	Almería	Estadio del Mediterráneo	22,000
Athletic Bilbao	Bilbao	San Mamés	39,750
Atlético Madrid	Madrid	Vicente Calderón	54,851
Barcelona	Barcelona	Camp Nou	99,354
Deportivo La Coruña	A Coruña	Riazor	34,600
Espanyol	Barcelona	Estadi Cornellà-El Prat	40,500
Getafe	Getafe	Coliseum Alfonso Pérez	17,700
Hércules	Alicante	Estadio José Rico Pérez	30,000
Levante	Valencia	Estadi Ciutat de València	25,534
Málaga	Málaga	La Rosaleda	28,963
Mallorca	Palma	Iberostar	23,142
Osasuna	Pamplona	Estadio Reyno de Navarra	19,800
Racing Santander	Santander	El Sardinero	22,271
Real Madrid	Madrid	Santiago Bernabéu	80,354
Real Sociedad	San Sebastián	Estadio Anoeta	32,076
Sevilla	Sevilla	Ramón Sánchez Pizjuán	45,500
Sporting de Gijón	Gijón	El Molinón	29,800
Valencia	Valencia	Mestalla	55,000
Villarreal	Vila-real	El Madrigal	25,000
Zaragoza	Zaragoza	La Romareda	34,596

=== Personnel and sponsorship ===
Team	Head coach	Captain	Kit manufacturer	Shirt sponsor	Shirt sponsor (back)	Shirt sponsor (sleeve)	Shorts sponsor
Almería	(Spain) Roberto Olabe	(Spain) José Ortiz	Rasán	Urcisol.com	Andalucía	None	None
Athletic Bilbao	(Spain) Joaquín Caparrós	(Spain) Pablo Orbaiz	Umbro	Petronor	None	Diputación Foral de Vizcaya	None
Atlético Madrid	(Spain) Quique Sánchez Flores	(Spain) Antonio López	Nike	Kia	Kyocera	None	Paf
Barcelona	(Spain) Pep Guardiola	(Spain) Carles Puyol	Nike	UNICEF^{1}	None	TV3	None
Deportivo La Coruña	(Spain) Miguel Ángel Lotina	(Spain) Manuel Pablo	Lotto	Estrella Galicia	None	None	None
Espanyol	(Argentina) Mauricio Pochettino	(Spain) Iván de la Peña	Li-Ning	InterApuestas.com	None	TV3	None
Getafe	(Spain) Míchel	(Spain) Javier Casquero	Joma	Burger King	Nevir	None	MisterApuestas, IG Markets
Hércules	(Serbia) Miroslav Đukić	(Spain) Paco Peña	Nike	Comunitat Valenciana	None	None	None
Levante	(Spain) Luis García Plaza	(Spain) Sergio Ballesteros	Luanvi	Comunitat Valenciana	València Terra i Mar - Diputació de València, MisterApuestas/BetVictor	None	Grupo Agora, MisterApuestas/BetVictor
Málaga	(Chile) Manuel Pellegrini	(Spain) Francesc Arnau	Li Ning	WilliamHill.com	Andalucía	None	Málaga Ciudad Genial
Mallorca	(Denmark) Michael Laudrup	(Portugal) Nunes	Macron	bet-at-home.com	Air Europa	ib-red	Meliá Hoteles, Illes Balears
Osasuna	(Spain) José Luis Mendilibar	(Iran) Javad Nekounam	Astore	None	NGS Technology	Caja Navarra	Reyno de Navarra, NGS Technology
Racing Santander	(Spain) Marcelino	(Spain) Pablo Pinillos	SLAM	Palacios Chorizo	Cantabria Infinita	None	None
Real Madrid	(Portugal) José Mourinho	(Spain) Iker Casillas	Adidas	Bwin.com	None	None	None
Real Sociedad	(Uruguay) Martín Lasarte	(Spain) Mikel Aranburu	Astore	Gipuzkoa Euskararekin Bat	Kutxa	None	None
Sevilla	(Spain) Gregorio Manzano	(Spain) Andrés Palop	Joma	12BET.com	Andalucía	None	12BET.com
Sporting de Gijón	(Spain) Manolo Preciado	(Spain) Rafel Sastre	Astore	Gijón - Asturias	Las Delicias Restaurante	Asturias Paraíso Natural, Deporte Asturiano	Asturias Paraíso Natural, Gijón, Deporte Asturiano
Valencia	(Spain) Unai Emery	(Spain) Vicente	Kappa	Unibet	None	None	Herbalife
Villarreal	(Spain) Juan Carlos Garrido	(Spain) Marcos Senna	Puma	Aeroport Castelló	Comunitat Valenciana	Canal Nou	None
Zaragoza	(Mexico) Javier Aguirre	(Spain) Gabi	Adidas	Proniño	None	Aragón TV	None

Barcelona makes a donation to UNICEF in order to display the charity's logo on the club's kit.

=== Managerial changes ===
Team	Outgoing manager	Manner of departure	Date of vacancy	Position in table	Replaced by	Date of appointment
Mallorca	(Spain) Gregorio Manzano	End of contract	19 May 2010	Pre-season	(Denmark) Michael Laudrup	2 July 2010
Real Madrid	(Chile) Manuel Pellegrini	Sacked	26 May 2010	Pre-season	(Portugal) José Mourinho	28 May 2010
Málaga	(Spain) Juan Muñiz	Sacked	16 June 2010	Pre-season	(Portugal) Jesualdo Ferreira	17 June 2010
Sevilla	(Spain) Antonio Álvarez	Sacked	26 September 2010	7th	(Spain) Gregorio Manzano	26 September 2010
Málaga	(Portugal) Jesualdo Ferreira	Sacked	2 November 2010	18th	(Chile) Manuel Pellegrini	2 November 2010
Zaragoza	(Spain) José Aurelio Gay	Sacked	17 November 2010	20th	(Mexico) Javier Aguirre	17 November 2010
Almería	(Spain) Juanma Lillo	Sacked	20 November 2010	19th	(Spain) José Luis Oltra	24 November 2010
Racing Santander	(Spain) Miguel Ángel Portugal	Sacked	7 February 2011	16th	(Spain) Marcelino	9 February 2011
Osasuna	(Spain) José Antonio Camacho	Sacked	14 February 2011	18th	(Spain) José Luis Mendilibar	14 February 2011
Hércules	(Spain) Esteban Vigo	Sacked	20 March 2011	20th	(Serbia) Miroslav Đukić	23 March 2011
Almería	(Spain) José Luis Oltra	Sacked	5 April 2011	20th	(Spain) Roberto Olabe	5 April 2011

== League table ==
Pos	Team	Pld	W	D	L	GF	GA	GD	Pts	Qualification or relegation
1	Barcelona (C)	38	30	6	2	95	21	+74	96	Qualification for the Champions League group stage
2	Real Madrid	38	29	5	4	102	33	+69	92	Qualification for the Champions League group stage
3	Valencia	38	21	8	9	64	44	+20	71	Qualification for the Champions League group stage
4	Villarreal	38	18	8	12	54	44	+10	62	Qualification for the Champions League play-off round
5	Sevilla	38	17	7	14	62	61	+1	58 (Note: SEV: 7 pts; ATH: 6 pts; ATM: 4 pts)	Qualification for the Europa League play-off round
6	Athletic Bilbao	38	18	4	16	59	55	+4	58	Qualification for the Europa League play-off round
7	Atlético Madrid	38	17	7	14	62	53	+9	58	Qualification for the Europa League third qualifying round (Note: The 2010–11 Copa del Rey champions (Real Madrid) and runners-up (Barcelona) qualified for the 2011–12 UEFA Champions League, thus the 7th-placed team qualified for the 2011–12 UEFA Europa League.)
8	Espanyol	38	15	4	19	46	55	−9	49	
9	Osasuna	38	13	8	17	45	46	−1	47 (Note: OSA 1–1 SPG; SPG 1–1 OSA)	
10	Sporting Gijón	38	11	14	13	35	42	−7	47	
11	Málaga	38	13	7	18	54	68	−14	46 (Note: MLG 4–1 RAC; RAC 1–2 MLG)	
12	Racing Santander	38	12	10	16	41	56	−15	46	
13	Zaragoza	38	12	9	17	40	53	−13	45 (Note: ZAR: 9 pts; LEV: 4 pts → LEV 2–1 RSO; RSO: 4 pts → RSO 1–1 LEV)	
14	Levante	38	12	9	17	41	52	−11	45	
15	Real Sociedad	38	14	3	21	49	66	−17	45	
16	Getafe	38	12	8	18	49	60	−11	44 (Note: GET 3–0 MLL; MLL 2–0 GET)	
17	Mallorca	38	12	8	18	41	56	−15	44	
18	Deportivo La Coruña (R)	38	10	13	15	31	47	−16	43	Relegation to the Segunda División
19	Hércules (R)	38	9	8	21	36	60	−24	35	Relegation to the Segunda División
20	Almería (R)	38	6	12	20	36	70	−34	30	Relegation to the Segunda División

Source: LFP, sportec.es, Yahoo! Sport
Rules for classification: 1st points; 2nd head-to-head points; 3rd head-to-head goal difference; 4th head-to-head goals scored; 5th goal difference; 6th number of goals scored; 7th Fair-play points
(C) Champions; (R) Relegated

== Results ==
Home \ Away	ALM	ATH	ATM	FCB	RCD	ESP	GET	HÉR	LEV	MCF	MLL	OSA	RAC	RMA	RSO	SFC	RSG	VCF	VIL	ZAR
Almería		1–3	2–2	0–8	1–1	3–2	2–3	1–1	0–1	1–1	3–1	3–2	1–1	1–1	2–2	0–1	1–1	0–3	0–0	1–1
Athletic Bilbao	1–0		1–2	1–3	1–2	2–1	3–0	3–0	3–2	1–1	3–0	1–0	2–1	0–3	2–1	2–0	3–0	1–2	0–1	2–1
Atlético Madrid	1–1	0–2		1–2	2–0	2–3	2–0	2–1	4–1	0–3	3–0	3–0	0–0	1–2	3–0	2–2	4–0	1–2	3–1	1–0
Barcelona	3–1	2–1	3–0		0–0	2–0	2–1	0–2	2–1	4–1	1–1	2–0	3–0	5–0	5–0	5–0	1–0	2–1	3–1	1–0
Deportivo La Coruña	0–2	2–1	0–1	0–4		3–0	2–2	1–0	0–1	3–0	2–1	0–0	2–0	0–0	2–1	3–3	1–1	0–2	1–0	0–0
Espanyol	1–0	2–1	2–2	1–5	2–0		3–1	3–0	2–1	1–0	1–2	1–0	1–2	0–1	4–1	2–3	1–0	2–2	0–1	4–0
Getafe	2–0	2–2	1–1	1–3	4–1	1–3		3–0	4–1	0–2	3–0	2–0	0–1	2–3	0–4	1–0	3–0	2–4	1–0	1–1
Hércules	1–2	0–1	4–1	0–3	1–0	0–0	0–0		3–1	4–1	2–2	0–4	2–3	1–3	2–1	2–0	0–0	1–2	2–2	2–1
Levante	1–0	1–2	2–0	1–1	1–2	1–0	2–0	2–1		3–1	1–1	2–1	3–1	0–0	2–1	1–4	0–0	0–1	1–2	1–2
Málaga	3–1	1–1	0–3	1–3	0–0	2–0	2–2	3–1	1–0		3–0	0–1	4–1	1–4	1–2	1–2	2–0	1–3	2–3	1–2
Mallorca	4–1	1–0	3–4	0–3	0–0	0–1	2–0	3–0	2–1	2–0		2–0	0–1	0–0	2–0	2–2	0–4	1–2	0–0	1–0
Osasuna	0–0	1–2	2–3	0–3	0–0	4–0	0–0	3–0	1–1	3–0	1–1		3–1	1–0	3–1	3–2	1–0	1–0	1–0	0–0
Racing Santander	1–0	1–2	2–1	0–3	1–0	0–0	0–1	0–0	1–1	1–2	2–0	4–1		1–3	2–1	3–2	1–1	1–1	2–2	2–0
Real Madrid	8–1	5–1	2–0	1–1	6–1	3–0	4–0	2–0	2–0	7–0	1–0	1–0	6–1		4–1	1–0	0–1	2–0	4–2	2–3
Real Sociedad	2–0	2–0	2–4	2–1	3–0	1–0	1–1	1–3	1–1	0–2	1–0	1–0	1–0	1–2		2–3	2–1	1–2	1–0	2–1
Sevilla	1–3	4–3	3–1	1–1	0–0	1–2	1–3	1–0	4–1	0–0	1–2	1–0	1–1	2–6	3–1		3–0	2–0	3–2	3–1
Sporting Gijón	1–0	2–2	1–0	1–1	2–2	1–0	2–0	2–0	1–1	1–2	2–0	1–0	2–1	0–1	1–3	2–0		0–2	1–1	0–0
Valencia	2–1	2–1	1–1	0–1	2–0	2–1	2–0	2–0	0–0	4–3	1–2	3–3	1–0	3–6	3–0	0–1	0–0		5–0	1–1
Villarreal	2–0	4–1	2–0	0–1	1–0	4–0	2–1	1–0	0–1	1–1	3–1	4–2	2–0	1–3	2–1	1–0	1–1	1–1		1–0
Zaragoza	1–0	2–1	0–1	0–2	1–0	1–0	2–1	0–0	1–0	3–5	3–2	1–3	1–1	1–3	2–1	1–2	2–2	4–0	0–3	

Source: LFP and futbol.sportec (in Spanish)
Legend: Blue = home team win; Yellow = draw; Red = away team win.

== Awards ==
=== La Liga Awards ===
La Liga's governing body, the Liga Nacional de Fútbol Profesional, honoured the competition's best players and coach with Awards.

Award	Recipient
Best Player	(Argentina) Lionel Messi (Barcelona)
Best Coach	(Spain) Pep Guardiola (Barcelona)
Best Goalkeeper	(Spain) Víctor Valdés (Barcelona)
Best Defender	(France) Eric Abidal (Barcelona)
Best Midfielder(s)	(Spain) Xavi (Barcelona) (Spain) Andrés Iniesta (Barcelona)
Best Forward	(Argentina) Lionel Messi (Barcelona)

Team of the Year
Goalkeeper	(Spain) Víctor Valdés (Barcelona)			
Defenders	(Brazil) Dani Alves (Barcelona)		(Spain) Gerard Piqué (Barcelona)	(Brazil) Marcelo (Real Madrid)
Midfielders	(Germany) Mesut Özil (Real Madrid)	(Argentina) Ángel Di María (Real Madrid)	(Spain) Xavi (Barcelona)	(Spain) Borja Valero (Villarreal)
Forwards	(Portugal) Cristiano Ronaldo (Real Madrid)		(Argentina) Lionel Messi (Barcelona)	(Argentina) Sergio Agüero (Atlético Madrid)

=== Top goalscorers ===
This is the list of goalscorers in accordance with the LFP as organising body.

Rank	Player	Club	Goals
1	(Portugal) Cristiano Ronaldo	Real Madrid	40
2	(Argentina) Lionel Messi	Barcelona	31
3	(Argentina) Sergio Agüero	Atlético Madrid	20
3	(Spain) Álvaro Negredo	Sevilla	20
5	(Spain) Fernando Llorente	Athletic Bilbao	18
5	(Italy) Giuseppe Rossi	Villarreal	18
5	(Spain) Roberto Soldado	Valencia	18
5	(Spain) David Villa	Barcelona	18
9	(France) Karim Benzema	Real Madrid	15
10	(Venezuela) Salomón Rondón	Málaga	14

- Source: LFP, ESPN Archived 24 October 2012 at the Wayback Machine and Liga BBVA

==== Pichichi Trophy ====
The Pichichi Trophy is awarded by newspaper Marca to the player who scores the most goals in a season, according to its own rules (different from the ones used by FIFA) to determine the goalscorer.

Rank	Player	Club	Goals	Penalties
1	(Portugal) Cristiano Ronaldo	Real Madrid	41	8
2	(Argentina) Lionel Messi	Barcelona	31	4
3	(Argentina) Sergio Agüero	Atlético Madrid	20	1
3	(Spain) Álvaro Negredo	Sevilla	20	3
5	(Spain) Fernando Llorente	Athletic Bilbao	18	0
5	(Italy) Giuseppe Rossi	Villarreal	18	4
5	(Spain) Roberto Soldado	Valencia	18	1
5	(Spain) David Villa	Barcelona	18	0
9	(France) Karim Benzema	Real Madrid	15	0
10	(Venezuela) Salomón Rondón	Málaga	14	0

- Source: Marca

=== Top assists ===
Rank	Player	Club	Assists
1	(Germany) Mesut Özil	Real Madrid	18
1	(Argentina) Lionel Messi	Barcelona	18
3	(Brazil) Dani Alves	Barcelona	15
4	(Spain) Xabi Prieto	Real Sociedad	13
5	(Spain) Juan Mata	Valencia	12
6	(Argentina) Ángel Di María	Real Madrid	11
7	(Spain) Santi Cazorla	Villarreal	10
7	(Portugal) Cristiano Ronaldo	Real Madrid	10
9	(Cape Verde) Valdo	Levante	8
9	(Spain) Borja Valero	Villarreal	8

- Source: ESPN Soccernet

=== Zamora Trophy ===
The Ricardo Zamora Trophy is awarded by newspaper Marca to the goalkeeper with the lowest ratio of goals conceded to matches played. A goalkeeper had to play at least 28 matches of 60 or more minutes to be eligible for the trophy.

Rank	Player	Club	Goals against	Matches	Average
1	(Spain) Víctor Valdés	Barcelona	16	32	0.50
2	(Spain) Iker Casillas	Real Madrid	32	34	0.94
3	(Spain) Dani Aranzubia	Deportivo La Coruña	36	32	1.13
4	(Spain) Diego López	Villarreal	44	38	1.16
5	(Spain) Ricardo	Osasuna	46	38	1.21

- Source: futbol.sportec

=== Fair Play award ===
This award was given annually since 1999 to the team with the best fair play during the season. This ranking took into account aspects such as cards, suspension of matches, audience behaviour and other penalties. This section not only aims to know this aspect, but also serves to break the tie in teams that are tied in all the other rules: points, head-to-head, goal difference and goals scored.

Rank	Club	Matches	Yellow card	Double Yellow Card/Ejection	Direct Red Card	Games of Suspension (Player, only when +3)	Games of Suspension (Club's Personnel)	Audience Behaviour		Total Points
1	Barcelona	38	95	1	1	–	–	–	–	100
2	Mallorca	38	90	1	3	–	–	–	–	101
3	Racing Santander	38	87	2	4	–	1^{38}	–	–	108
4	Hércules	38	94	3	3	–	–	–	–	109
5	Real Sociedad	38	81	0	0	–	2^{9, 37}	4 Milds^{3, 14, 23, 36}	–	111
6	Deportivo La Coruña	38	96	4	1	–	–	1 Mild^{21}	–	112
7	Real Madrid	38	94	4	3	–	1^{5}	–	–	116
8	Villarreal	38	95	3	2	–	2^{25}	–	–	117
9	Almería	38	99	1	3	–	3^{25, 29, 35}	–	–	125
9	Athletic Bilbao	38	105	3	3	–	–	1 Mild^{11}	–	125
11	Getafe	38	111	4	4	–	–	–	–	132
12	Sporting Gijón	38	110	2	3	–	2^{27, 35}	–	–	133
13	Atlético Madrid	38	104	0	5	–	3^{8, 13}	–	–	134
14	Espanyol	38	119	2	3	–	–	1 Mild^{36}	–	137
15	Málaga	38	104	3	3	–	1^{20}	3 Milds^{18, 25, 38}	–	139
16	Osasuna	38	112	4	2	–	–	3 Milds^{21, 36, 38}	–	141
17	Sevilla	38	102	3	3	–	2^{16, 28}	4 Milds^{4, 6, 33, 38}	–	147
18	Levante	38	125	0	3	–	2^{36, 37}	1 Mild^{38}	–	149
18	Valencia	38	130	4	2	–	1^{25}	–	–	149
20	Zaragoza	38	125	3	4	–	1^{8}	1 Mild^{31}	–	153

- Source: 2010–11 Fair Play Rankings Season.

Sources of cards and penalties: Referee's reports, Competition Committee's Sanctions, Appeal Committee Resolutions and RFEF's Directory about Fair Play Rankings

Legend:

Icon	Term	Points of sanction	Description
	Yellow Card	1 point/yellow card	
	Double Yellow Card/Ejection	2 points/double yellow card	
	Direct Red Card	3 points/red card	
	Games of Suspension (Player)	As many as banned games	When a player is banned for play more than 3 future games. This punishment overrides the possible red card which caused this sanction
	Games of Suspension (Club's Personnel)	5 points/banned game	When some person of the club (not player) is banned for x future games. This punishment overrides the possible red card which caused this sanction
	Audience Behaviour	Mild (5 points); Serious (6 points); Very Serious (7 points)	When the audience makes some altercations such as explosions, flares, throwing objects to the ground, racist chanting, etc.
	Closure of Stadium	10 points/match with closured stadium	When serious incidents happen which are punished by the closure of the stadium
It also accounts cards to non-players
The number in superscript is the corresponding round to the sanction
Important note: This table is not a count of cards and sanctions resulting from the matches, this table takes into account the removal or application of some cards and sanctions by the competent bodies (Competition Committee, Appeal Committee and Spanish Sports Disciplinary Committee)

=== Pedro Zaballa award ===
Real Madrid

=== Overall ===
- Most wins - Barcelona (30)
- Fewest wins - Almería (6)
- Most draws - Sporting Gijón (14)
- Fewest draws - Real Sociedad (3)
- Most losses - Real Sociedad and Hércules (21)
- Fewest losses - Barcelona (2)
- Most goals scored - Real Madrid (102)
- Fewest goals scored - Deportivo La Coruña (31)
- Most goals conceded - Almería (70)
- Fewest goals conceded - Barcelona (21)

== Season statistics ==
=== Scoring ===
- First goal of the season:
  (Spain) Fernando Llorente for Athletic Bilbao against Hércules (28 August 2010).
- Last goal of the season:
  (Sweden) Kennedy Bakircioglu for Racing Santander against Athletic Bilbao (21 May 2011).

=== Hat-tricks ===
Player	For	Against	Result	Date	Reference
(Portugal) Cristiano Ronaldo^{4}	Real Madrid	Racing Santander	6–1 (H)	23 October 2010	
(Argentina) Lionel Messi	Barcelona	Almería	8–0 (A)	20 November 2010	
(Portugal) Cristiano Ronaldo	Real Madrid	Athletic Bilbao	5–1 (H)	20 November 2010	
(Portugal) Cristiano Ronaldo	Real Madrid	Villarreal	4–2 (H)	9 January 2011	
(Brazil) Luís Fabiano	Sevilla	Levante	4–1 (H)	22 January 2011	
(Argentina) Lionel Messi	Barcelona	Atlético Madrid	3–0 (H)	5 February 2011	
(Portugal) Cristiano Ronaldo	Real Madrid	Málaga	7–0 (H)	3 March 2011	
(Spain) Roberto Soldado^{4}	Valencia	Getafe	4–2 (A)	2 April 2011	
(Brazil) Diego Costa	Atlético Madrid	Osasuna	3–2 (A)	3 April 2011	
(Argentina) Gonzalo Higuaín	Real Madrid	Valencia	6–3 (A)	23 April 2011	
(Portugal) Cristiano Ronaldo^{4}	Real Madrid	Sevilla	6–2 (A)	7 May 2011	
(Portugal) Cristiano Ronaldo	Real Madrid	Getafe	3–0 (H)	10 May 2011	
(Togo) Emmanuel Adebayor	Real Madrid	Almeria	8–1 (H)	21 May 2011	
(Argentina) Sergio Agüero	Atlético Madrid	Mallorca	4–2 (A)	21 May 2011	

^{4} Player scored four goals (H) – Home; (A) – Away

=== Discipline ===
- First yellow card of the season: (France) Noé Pamarot for Hércules against Athletic Bilbao (28 August 2010)
- First red card of the season: (Argentina) Matías Fritzler for Hércules against Athletic Bilbao (28 August 2010)

== Attendances ==
FC Barcelona drew the highest average home attendance in the 2010-11 edition of La Liga.

#	Football club	Home games	Average attendance
1	FC Barcelona	19	79,268
2	Real Madrid	19	71,289
3	Atlético de Madrid	19	41,526
4	Valencia CF	19	39,963
5	Athletic Club	19	36,042
6	Sevilla FC	19	35,789
7	RCD Espanyol	19	26,873
8	Real Sociedad	19	25,227
9	Málaga CF	19	24,904
10	Real Zaragoza	19	21,654
11	Hércules CF	19	21,452
12	Real Sporting de Gijón	19	21,310
13	Deportivo de La Coruña	19	19,984
14	Villarreal CF	19	18,826
15	Osasuna	19	16,109
16	Racing de Santander	19	15,228
17	RCD Mallorca	19	14,453
18	UD Almería	19	11,759
19	Levante UD	19	11,622
20	Getafe CF	19	11,132

== See also ==
- List of Spanish football transfers summer 2010
- List of Spanish football transfers winter 2010–11
- 2010–11 Segunda División
- 2010–11 Copa del Rey
