= List of Spanish football transfers summer 2010 =

This is a list of Spanish football transfers for the summer sale in the 2010–11 season of La Liga and Segunda División. Only moves from La Liga and Segunda División are listed.

The summer transfer window opened on 1 July 2010, although a few transfers took place prior to that date. The window closed at midnight on 31 August 2010. Players without a club could have joined one at any time, either during or in between transfer windows. Clubs below La Liga level could also have signed players on loan at any time. If need be, clubs could have signed a goalkeeper on an emergency loan, if all others were unavailable.

== Summer 2010 transfer window ==
Date	Name	Moving from	Moving to	Fee
2010-02-22	(Spain) Sergio Canales	(Spain) Racing de Santander	(Spain) Real Madrid	€5m
2010-04-07	(Argentina) Gastón Sangoy	(Cyprus) Apollon Limassol	(Spain) Sporting de Gijón	€1m
2010-04-16	(Nigeria) Stanley Okoro	(Nigeria) Heartland F.C.	(Spain) UD Almería	Free
2010-04-22	(Spain) Airam López	(Spain) CD Tenerife B	(Spain) Villarreal CF B	Free
2010-04-24	(France) Sofiane Feghouli	(France) Grenoble Foot 38	(Spain) Valencia CF	Free
2010-04-27	(Germany) Christoph Metzelder	(Spain) Real Madrid	(Germany) FC Schalke 04	Free
2010-04-28	(Spain) Fernando Seoane	(Spain) CD Lugo	(Spain) Gimnàstic de Tarragona	Free
2010-05-12	(Turkey) Mehmet Topal	(Turkey) Galatasaray S.K.	(Spain) Valencia CF	€4.2m
2010-05-13	(Spain) Álex Quillo	(Spain) UD Almería	(Spain) Recreativo de Huelva	Free
2010-05-17	(Spain) Ayoze García	(Spain) CD Tenerife	(Spain) Sporting de Gijón	Free
2010-05-17	(Portugal) Ricardo Costa	(France) Lille OSC	(Spain) Valencia CF	Free
2010-05-18	(Spain) Francis	(Spain) Xerez CD	(Spain) Racing de Santander	Free
2010-05-18	(Spain) Domingo Cisma	(Spain) UD Almería	(Spain) Racing de Santander	Free
2010-05-19	(Spain) David Villa	(Spain) Valencia CF	(Spain) FC Barcelona	€40m
2010-05-19	(Spain) Mikel San José	(England) Liverpool	(Spain) Athletic Bilbao	€2.74m
2010-05-20	(Spain) Borja Fernández	(Spain) Real Valladolid	(Spain) Getafe CF	Free
2010-05-21	(Spain) Fernando Soriano	(Spain) UD Almería	(Spain) CA Osasuna	Free
2010-05-21	(Spain) Nacho Novo	(Scotland) Rangers F.C.	(Spain) Sporting de Gijón	Free
2010-05-23	(France) Mouhamadou Dabo	(France) AS Saint-Étienne	(Spain) Sevilla FC	Free
2010-05-24	(Spain) Fran Mérida	(England) Arsenal	(Spain) Atlético Madrid	Free
2010-05-25	(Argentina) Daniel Pendín	(Spain) CD Castellón	(Spain) Pontevedra CF	Free
2010-05-25	(Spain) Míchel Herrero	(Spain) Valencia CF	(Spain) Deportivo de La Coruña	Loan
2010-05-26	(Spain) Igor Martínez	(Spain) Deportivo Alavés	(Spain) Athletic Bilbao	€0.2m
2010-05-26	(Serbia) Nikola Žigić	(Spain) Valencia CF	(England) Birmingham City	€7m
2010-05-28	(Spain) Pau Franch	(Spain) CD Alcoyano	(Spain) CD Castellón	Loan return
2010-05-29	(Brazil) Felipe Mattioni	(Brazil) Maga Esporte	(Spain) RCD Mallorca	€1m
2010-06-01	(Argentina) Germán Pacheco	(Spain) Atlético Madrid	(Argentina) C.A. Independiente	Loan
2010-06-02	(Spain) Arturo Navarro	(Spain) Valencia CF Mestalla	(Spain) Elche CF	Free
2010-06-02	(Spain) Lillo	(Spain) Valencia CF Mestalla	(Spain) Elche CF	Free
2010-06-02	(Spain) Javier Carpio	(Spain) CD Alcoyano	(Spain) Elche CF	Free
2010-06-03	(Spain) Pablo Ibáñez	(Spain) Atlético Madrid	(England) West Bromwich Albion	Free
2010-06-04	(Spain) Ibai Gómez	(Spain) Sestao River Club	(Spain) Athletic Bilbao	Free
2010-06-04	(Spain) Mario Suárez	(Spain) RCD Mallorca	(Spain) Atlético Madrid	€1.8m
2010-06-04	(Brazil) Renan Brito	(Spain) Xerez CD	(Spain) Valencia CF	Loan return
2010-06-04	(Brazil) Renan Brito	(Spain) Valencia CF	(Brazil) Sport Club Internacional	Loan
2010-06-08	(Spain) Alberto Botía	(Spain) FC Barcelona	(Spain) Sporting de Gijón	Free
2010-06-08	(Spain) Iván Marcano	(Spain) Villarreal CF	(Spain) Getafe CF	Loan
2010-06-09	(Spain) Roberto Jiménez	(Spain) Real Zaragoza	(Spain) Atlético Madrid	Loan return
2010-06-09	(Spain) Roberto Soldado	(Spain) Getafe CF	(Spain) Valencia CF	€8m
2010-06-09	(Spain) Saúl Fernández	(Spain) Elche CF	(Spain) Deportivo de La Coruña	Free
2010-06-15	(Spain) Álex Ortiz	(Spain) Real Betis B	(Spain) Gimnàstic de Tarragona	Free
2010-06-16	(Spain) Joseba Llorente	(Spain) Villarreal CF	(Spain) Real Sociedad	€2.4m
2010-06-16	(Spain) Francisco Sutil	(Spain) SD Eibar	(Spain) Real Sociedad	Free
2010-06-16	(Haiti) Yves Desmarets	(Portugal) Vitória S.C.	(Spain) Deportivo de La Coruña	Free
2010-06-16	(Spain) Pedro Barrancos	(Spain) Racing de Santander B	(Spain) Granada CF	Free
2010-06-17	(Italy) Tiberio Guarente	(Italy) Atalanta BC	(Spain) Sevilla FC	€5m
2010-06-18	(Spain) Asier Riesgo	(Spain) Real Sociedad	(Spain) CA Osasuna	Free
2010-06-19	(Spain) Francisco Yeste	(Spain) Athletic Bilbao	(United Arab Emirates) AlWasl Club	Free
2010-06-21	(Argentina) Leonardo Ulloa	(Spain) CD Castellón	(Spain) UD Almería	€0.9m
2010-06-21	(Uruguay) Jonathan Urretavizcaya	(Portugal) SL Benfica	(Spain) Deportivo de La Coruña	Loan
2010-06-22	(Algeria) Walid Cherfa	(Spain) Gimnàstic de Tarragona	(Spain) Girona FC	Free
2010-06-22	(Spain) Queco Piña	Free agent	(Spain) SD Ponferradina	Free
2010-06-23	(Argentina) Damián Escudero	(Spain) Villarreal CF	(Argentina) Boca Juniors	€2.5m
2010-06-23	(France) Grégory Béranger	(Spain) UD Las Palmas	(Spain) RCD Espanyol	Loan return
2010-06-25	(Spain) Roberto Jiménez	(Spain) Atlético Madrid	(Portugal) SL Benfica	€8.5m
2010-06-25	(Spain) Quique de Lucas	(Spain) FC Cartagena	(Spain) Celta de Vigo	Free
2010-06-25	(Serbia) Dejan Lekic	(Serbia) Red Star Belgrade	(Spain) CA Osasuna	€2.5m
2010-06-28	(Spain) César Azpilicueta	(Spain) CA Osasuna	(France) Olympique de Marseille	€7m
2010-06-28	(Spain) Alfredo Máyor	(Spain) UE Sant Andreu	(Spain) SD Ponferradina	Free
2010-06-28	(Spain) Momo	(Spain) Xerez CD	(Spain) Real Betis	Free
2010-06-28	(Spain) David Lázaro	(Spain) Villarreal CF B	(Spain) CD Castellón	Free
2010-06-28	(Argentina) Ángel Di María	(Portugal) S.L. Benfica	(Spain) Real Madrid	€25m
2010-06-28	(Spain) Borja Sánchez	(Spain) CD Dénia	(Spain) Girona FC	Free
2010-06-29	(Colombia) Abel Aguilar	(Italy) Udinese Calcio	(Spain) Real Zaragoza	Re-Loan
2010-06-29	(Spain) Javier Arizmendi	(Spain) Real Zaragoza	(Spain) Getafe CF	€2m
2010-06-29	(Spain) Jorge Molina	(Spain) Elche CF	(Spain) Real Betis	€1.6m
2010-06-30	(Spain) David Silva	(Spain) Valencia CF	(England) Manchester City	€30m
2010-06-30	(Spain) José Moragón	(Spain) CF Reus Deportiu	(Spain) Gimnàstic de Tarragona	Free
2010-06-30	(Denmark) Michael Jakobsen	(Denmark) Aalborg BK	(Spain) UD Almería	Free
2010-06-30	(Spain) Antonio Hidalgo	(Spain) Albacete Balompié	(Spain) CD Tenerife	Free
2010-06-30	(Spain) Julen Goñi	(Spain) Athletic Bilbao	(Spain) Barakaldo CF	Loan
2010-07-01	(Portugal) Tiago Mendes	(Spain) Atlético Madrid	(Italy) Juventus FC	Loan return
2010-07-01	(Colombia) Brayan Angulo	(Spain) Deportivo de La Coruña	(Portugal) Leixões S.C.	Loan return
2010-07-01	(Spain) Javi Guerra	(Spain) Levante UD	(Spain) RCD Mallorca	Loan return
2010-07-01	(Spain) Pau Cendrós	(Spain) Levante UD	(Spain) RCD Mallorca	Loan return
2010-07-01	(Spain) Miguel Pallardó	(Spain) Levante UD	(Spain) Getafe CF	Loan return
2010-07-01	(Serbia) Milan Stepanov	(Spain) Málaga CF	(Portugal) FC Porto	Loan return
2010-07-01	(Spain) Roberto Santamaría	(Spain) Málaga CF	(Spain) UD Las Palmas	Loan return
2010-07-01	(Spain) Valdo	(Spain) Málaga CF	(Spain) RCD Espanyol	Loan return
2010-07-01	(Ecuador) Felipe Caicedo	(Spain) Málaga CF	(England) Manchester City	Loan return
2010-07-01	(Nigeria) Victor Obinna	(Spain) Málaga CF	(Italy) F.C. Internazionale	Loan return
2010-07-01	(Italy) Fernando Forestieri	(Spain) Málaga CF	(Italy) Genoa C.F.C.	Loan return
2010-07-01	(Spain) Borja Valero	(Spain) RCD Mallorca	(England) West Bromwich Albion	Loan return
2010-07-01	(South Africa) Nasief Morris	(Spain) Racing de Santander	(Greece) Panathinaikos FC	Loan return
2010-07-01	(Brazil) Henrique	(Spain) Racing de Santander	(Spain) FC Barcelona	Loan return
2010-07-01	(Lithuania) Marius Stankevicius	(Spain) Sevilla FC	(Italy) UC Sampdoria	Loan return
2010-07-01	(Serbia) Milan Smiljanic	(Spain) Sporting de Gijón	(Spain) RCD Espanyol	Loan return
2010-07-01	(Italy) Matteo Contini	(Spain) Real Zaragoza	(Italy) S.S.C. Napoli	Loan return
2010-07-01	(Venezuela) Pablo Camacho	(Spain) RCD Espanyol	(Venezuela) Caracas FC	Loan return
2010-07-01	(Brazil) Wellington Baroni	(Greece) Panionios F.C.	(Spain) RCD Espanyol	Loan return
2010-07-01	(Spain) Kiko Casilla	(Spain) Cádiz CF	(Spain) RCD Espanyol	Loan return
2010-07-01	(Colombia) Jonathan Estrada	(Spain) Real Sociedad	(Colombia) CD Los Millonarios	Loan return
2010-07-01	(Portugal) Jorge Gonçalves	(Portugal) Vitória S.C.	(Spain) Racing de Santander	Loan return
2010-07-01	(Spain) Carlos García	(Spain) Real Betis	(Spain) UD Almería	Loan return
2010-07-01	(Nigeria) Stephen Sunday	(Spain) Real Betis	(Spain) Valencia CF	Loan return
2010-07-01	(Spain) Miguel Ángel	(Spain) Gimnàstic de Tarragona	(Spain) Málaga CF	Loan return
2010-07-01	(Spain) David Lombán	(Spain) UD Salamanca	(Spain) Valencia CF	Loan return
2010-07-01	(Spain) José Ángel Crespo	(Spain) Racing de Santander	(Spain) Sevilla FC	Loan return
2010-07-01	(Argentina) Jerónimo Barrales	(Spain) Recreativo de Huelva	(Argentina) Club Atlético Banfield	Loan return
2010-07-01	(Argentina) Iván Pillud	(Spain) RCD Espanyol	(Argentina) Newell's Old Boys	Loan return
2010-07-01	(Portugal) Vasco Fernandes	(Spain) Celta de Vigo	(Portugal) Leixões S.C.	Loan return
2010-07-01	(Brazil) Laionel Silva	(Spain) UD Salamanca	(Portugal) Vitória F.C.	Loan return
2010-07-01	(Spain) Jaume Costa	(Spain) Cádiz CF	(Spain) Valencia CF	Loan return
2010-07-01	(Spain) Juanma Marrero	(Spain) SD Huesca	(Spain) Rayo Vallecano	Loan return
2010-07-01	(Spain) Vicente Guaita	(Spain) Recreativo de Huelva	(Spain) Valencia CF	Loan return
2010-07-01	(Argentina) Juan Pablo Carrizo	(Spain) Real Zaragoza	(Italy) S.S. Lazio	Loan return
2010-07-01	(Spain) Jorge García	(Spain) Gimnàstic de Tarragona	(Spain) Sporting de Gijón	Loan return
2010-07-01	(Spain) Juanma Hernández	(Spain) Girona FC	(Spain) RCD Espanyol	Loan return
2010-07-01	(Spain) Ernesto Galán	(Spain) Girona FC	(Spain) RCD Espanyol	Loan return
2010-07-01	(Spain) Jesús Rueda	(Spain) Córdoba CF	(Spain) Real Valladolid B	Loan return
2010-07-01	(Spain) Iriome González	(Spain) SD Huesca	(Spain) CD Tenerife	Loan return
2010-07-01	(Spain) Diego de Miguel	(Spain) CD Izarra	(Spain) CD Numancia	Loan return
2010-07-01	(Equatorial Guinea) Emilio Nsue	(Spain) Real Sociedad	(Spain) RCD Mallorca	Loan return
2010-07-01	(Portugal) Pelé	(Spain) Real Valladolid	(Portugal) FC Porto	Loan return
2010-07-01	(Spain) Ximo Navarro	(Spain) Elche CF	(Spain) Valencia CF Mestalla	Loan return
2010-07-01	(Brazil) Keirrison	(Italy) ACF Fiorentina	(Spain) FC Barcelona	Loan return
2010-07-01	(Uruguay) Andrés Lamas	(Spain) UD Las Palmas	(Spain) Recreativo de Huelva	Loan return
2010-07-01	(Ecuador) Joffre Guerrón	(Brazil) Cruzeiro	(Spain) Getafe CF	Loan return
2010-07-01	(Spain) Jesús Perera	(Spain) Elche CF	(Spain) Rayo Vallecano	Loan return
2010-07-01	(Brazil) Pedro Botelho	(Spain) Celta de Vigo	(England) Arsenal	Loan return
2010-07-01	(Spain) Juanmi Callejón	(Spain) Albacete Balompié	(Spain) RCD Mallorca	Loan return
2010-07-01	(Spain) Bruno Herrero	(Spain) UD Salamanca	(Spain) Real Murcia	Loan return
2010-07-01	(Belarus) Alexander Hleb	(Germany) VfB Stuttgart	(Spain) FC Barcelona	Loan return
2010-07-01	(Uruguay) Martín Cáceres	(Italy) Juventus FC	(Spain) FC Barcelona	Loan return
2010-07-01	(Argentina) Facundo Roncaglia	(Spain) RCD Espanyol	(Argentina) Boca Juniors	Loan return
2010-07-01	(Argentina) Leandro Gioda	(Spain) Xerez CD	(Argentina) C.A. Independiente	Loan return
2010-07-01	(Spain) César Ortiz	(Spain) Albacete Balompié	(Spain) Atlético Madrid B	Loan return
2010-07-01	(Uruguay) Christian Stuani	(Spain) Albacete Balompié	(Italy) Reggina Calcio	Loan return
2010-07-01	(Portugal) Hugo Viana	(Portugal) SC Braga	(Spain) Valencia CF	Loan return
2010-07-01	(Spain) Ángel Martínez	(Spain) Rayo Vallecano	(Spain) RCD Espanyol	Loan return
2010-07-01	(Argentina) Román Martínez	(Spain) CD Tenerife	(Spain) RCD Espanyol	Loan return
2010-07-01	(Spain) Álex Cruz	(Spain) CF Atlético Ciudad	(Spain) Gimnàstic de Tarragona	Loan return
2010-07-01	(United States) Jozy Altidore	(England) Hull City	(Spain) Villarreal CF	Loan return
2010-07-01	(Spain) Natalio Lorenzo	(Spain) Real Murcia	(Spain) UD Almería	Loan return
2010-07-01	(Spain) Ángel Montoro	(Spain) Real Unión	(Spain) Valencia CF	Loan return
2010-07-01	(Argentina) Damián Lizio	(Spain) Córdoba CF	(Argentina) C.A. River Plate	Loan return
2010-07-01	(Peru) Damián Ísmodes	(Peru) Sporting Cristal	(Spain) Racing de Santander	Loan return
2010-07-01	(Spain) Mikel Balenziaga	(Spain) CD Numancia	(Spain) Athletic Bilbao	Loan return
2010-07-01	(Spain) Ander Murillo	(Spain) UD Salamanca	(Spain) Athletic Bilbao	Loan return
2010-07-01	(Spain) Víctor Sánchez	(Spain) Xerez CD	(Spain) FC Barcelona Atlétic	Loan return
2010-07-01	(Spain) Aythami	(Spain) Xerez CD	(Spain) Deportivo de La Coruña	Loan return
2010-07-01	(Uruguay) Carlos Bueno	(Spain) Real Sociedad	(Uruguay) C.A. Peñarol	Loan return
2010-07-01	(Spain) David Prieto	(Spain) Xerez CD	(Spain) Sevilla FC	Loan return
2010-07-01	(Hungary) András Simon	(Spain) Córdoba CF	(England) Liverpool	Loan return
2010-07-01	(Spain) Álvaro Antón	(Spain) Recreativo de Huelva	(Spain) Real Valladolid	Loan return
2010-07-01	(Spain) Pedro Alcalá	(Spain) Real Unión	(Spain) Málaga CF	Loan return
2010-07-01	(Spain) Rubén Castro	(Spain) Rayo Vallecano	(Spain) Deportivo de La Coruña	Loan return
2010-07-01	(Argentina) Óscar Trejo	(Spain) Elche CF	(Spain) RCD Mallorca	Loan return
2010-07-01	(Spain) Agustín García	(Spain) Córdoba CF	(Spain) Real Madrid Castilla	Loan return
2010-07-01	(Spain) Roberto Platero	(Spain) Barakaldo CF	(Spain) CD Numancia	Loan return
2010-07-01	(Brazil) Dinei	(Spain) CD Tenerife	(Brazil) Clube Atlético Paranaense	Loan return
2010-07-01	(Spain) Antonio Troyano	(Spain) UD Marbella	(Spain) Córdoba CF	Loan return
2010-07-01	(Spain) José Manuel Casado	(Spain) Xerez CD	(Spain) Sevilla Atlético	Loan return
2010-07-01	(Spain) Martí Crespí	(Spain) Elche CF	(Spain) RCD Mallorca	Loan return
2010-07-01	(Spain) Álex Bergantiños	(Spain) Xerez CD	(Spain) Deportivo de La Coruña	Loan return
2010-07-01	(Argentina) Leonel Altobelli	(Spain) Albacete Balompié	(Argentina) Club Atlético Tigre	Loan return
2010-07-01	(Argentina) Fabián Assmann	(Spain) UD Las Palmas	(Argentina) C.A. Independiente	Loan return
2010-07-01	(Chile) Fabián Orellana	(Spain) Xerez CD	(Italy) Udinese Calcio	Loan return
2010-07-01	(Uruguay) Bruno Fornaroli	(Spain) Recreativo de Huelva	(Italy) U.C. Sampdoria	Loan return
2010-07-01	(Spain) Aarón Ñíguez	(Spain) Celta de Vigo	(Spain) Valencia CF	Loan return
2010-07-01	(Denmark) Magnus Troest	(Spain) Recreativo de Huelva	(Italy) Genoa C.F.C.	Loan return
2010-07-01	(Spain) Xisco Jiménez	(Spain) Racing de Santander	(England) Newcastle United	Loan return
2010-07-01	(Serbia) Ranko Despotovic	(Spain) UD Salamanca	(Spain) Real Murcia	Loan return
2010-07-01	(Spain) Pere Martí	(Spain) Real Murcia	(Spain) Málaga CF	Loan return
2010-07-01	(Slovenia) Branko Ilic	(Russia) FC Moscow	(Spain) Real Betis	Loan return
2010-07-01	(Uruguay) Paulo Pezzolano	(Spain) RCD Mallorca	(Uruguay) Liverpool de Montevideo	Loan return
2010-07-01	(Mali) Sidi Keita	(Spain) Xerez CD	(France) RC Lens	Loan return
2010-07-01	(Brazil) Tiago Dutra	(Israel) Maccabi Haifa	(Spain) Villarreal CF	Loan return
2010-07-01	(Japan) Hiroshi Ibusuki	(Spain) Real Zaragoza	(Spain) Girona FC	Loan return
2010-07-01	(Spain) Juanjo Expósito	(Spain) Córdoba CF	(Spain) Racing de Santander	Loan return
2010-07-01	(Nigeria) Bartholomew Ogbeche	(Spain) Cádiz CF	(Spain) Real Valladolid	Loan return
2010-07-01	(Spain) Jonan García	(Spain) UE Lleida	(Spain) SD Huesca	Loan return
2010-07-01	(Spain) Toño Ramírez	(Spain) CD Tenerife	(Spain) Real Sociedad	Loan return
2010-07-01	(Uruguay) Javier Chevantón	(Italy) Atalanta BC	(Spain) Sevilla FC	Loan return
2010-07-01	(Chile) Nicolás Medina	(Spain) CD Castellón	(Spain) CA Osasuna	Loan return
2010-07-01	(Colombia) Mauricio Arroyo	(Spain) Gimnàstic de Tarragona	(Colombia) Real Cartagena	Loan return
2010-07-01	(Uruguay) Nacho González	(Greece) Levadiakos F.C.	(Spain) Valencia CF	Loan return
2010-07-01	(Spain) Salvador Pérez	(Spain) CP Cacereño	(Spain) Villarreal CF B	Loan return
2010-07-01	(Spain) Carlos de la Vega	(Spain) SD Huesca	(Spain) Rayo Vallecano	Loan return
2010-07-01	(Portugal) Eliseu	(Spain) Real Zaragoza	(Italy) S.S. Lazio	Loan return
2010-07-01	(Chile) Humberto Suazo	(Spain) Real Zaragoza	(Mexico) C.F. Monterrey	Loan return
2010-07-01	(Argentina) Pablo Daniel Osvaldo	(Spain) RCD Espanyol	(Italy) Bologna F.C. 1909	Loan return
2010-07-01	(Portugal) Edinho	(Greece) PAOK	(Spain) Málaga CF	Loan return
2010-07-01	(France) Franck Signorino	(Spain) FC Cartagena	(Spain) Getafe CF	Loan return
2010-07-01	(Cameroon) Franck Songo'o	(Spain) Real Sociedad	(Spain) Real Zaragoza	Loan return
2010-07-01	(Spain) Raúl Fernández	(Spain) Granada CF	(Spain) Athletic Bilbao	Loan return
2010-07-01	(Spain) Marcos Tébar	(Spain) Girona FC	(Spain) Real Madrid Castilla	Loan return
2010-07-01	(Nigeria) Odion Ighalo	(Spain) Granada CF	(Italy) Udinese Calcio	Loan return
2010-07-01	(Spain) Óscar Pérez	(Spain) Granada CF	(Italy) Udinese Calcio	Loan return
2010-07-01	(Belgium) Ritchie Kitoko	(Spain) Granada CF	(Italy) Udinese Calcio	Loan return
2010-07-01	(Democratic Republic of the Congo) Tetteh Abdul Aziz	(Spain) Granada CF	(Italy) Udinese Calcio	Loan return
2010-07-01	(Spain) Braulio Nóbrega	(Spain) Recreativo de Huelva	(Spain) Real Zaragoza	Loan return
2010-07-01	(Spain) Adrián Colunga	(Spain) Real Zaragoza	(Spain) Recreativo de Huelva	Loan return
2010-07-01	(Spain) Roberto Batres	(China) Shanghai Shenhua	(Spain) Atlético Madrid	Loan return
2010-07-01	(Argentina) Gastón Cellerino	(Spain) Celta de Vigo	(Italy) Livorno Calcio	Loan return
2010-07-01	(Uruguay) Sebastián Eguren	(Italy) S.S. Lazio	(Spain) Villarreal CF	Loan return
2010-07-01	(Spain) Óscar Díaz	(Italy) Recreativo de Huelva	(Spain) RCD Mallorca	Loan return
2010-07-01	(Spain) Xabier Etxeita	(Spain) FC Cartagena	(Spain) Athletic Bilbao	Loan return
2010-07-01	(Spain) Miguel Palanca	(Spain) CD Castellón	(Spain) Real Madrid	Loan return
2010-07-01	(Spain) Jonatan Valle	(Spain) SD Ponferradina	(Spain) CD Castellón	Loan return
2010-07-01	(Argentina) Gustavo Alustiza	(Spain) Xerez CD	(Argentina) Chacarita Juniors	Loan return
2010-07-01	(Spain) Keko Gontán	(Spain) Real Valladolid	(Spain) Atlético Madrid	Loan return
2010-07-01	(Spain) Javier Balboa	(Spain) FC Cartagena	(Portugal) S.L. Benfica	Loan return
2010-07-01	(Spain) Javi Lara	(Spain) CD Alcoyano	(Spain) Elche CF	Loan return
2010-07-01	(Spain) Asier del Horno	(Spain) Real Valladolid	(Spain) Valencia CF	Loan return
2010-07-01	(Uruguay) Nicolás Vigneri	(Spain) Xerez CD	(Mexico) Puebla F.C.	Loan return
2010-07-01	(Ivory Coast) Arouna Koné	(Germany) Hannover 96	(Spain) Sevilla FC	Loan return
2010-07-01	(Spain) Armiche Ortega	(Spain) Benidorm CF	(Spain) UD Las Palmas	Loan return
2010-07-01	(Spain) Pedro Vega	(Spain) Universidad LPGC	(Spain) UD Las Palmas	Loan return
2010-07-01	(Spain) Rafa Gómez	(Spain) Sangonera Atlético CF	(Spain) Elche CF	Loan return
2010-07-01	(Brazil) Thiago Carleto	(Brazil) São Paulo	(Spain) Valencia CF	Loan return
2010-07-01	(Brazil) Pablo de Barros	(Spain) Gimnàstic de Tarragona	(Spain) Real Zaragoza	Loan return
2010-07-01	(Spain) Miguel Ángel Riau	(Spain) Valencia CF Mestalla	(Spain) FC Cartagena	Free
2010-07-01	(Spain) Juan Domínguez	(Spain) Real Unión	(Spain) Gimnàstic de Tarragona	Free
2010-07-01	(Brazil) Vasco Fernandes	(Portugal) Leixões S.C.	(Spain) Elche CF	Free
2010-07-01	(Spain) Francisco Javier Barranco	(Spain) Sevilla FC	(Spain) CA Osasuna B	Free
2010-07-01	(Spain) Jorge Galán	(Spain) CA Osasuna	(Spain) SD Huesca	Loan
2010-07-01	(Spain) Óscar Vega	(Spain) CA Osasuna	(Spain) SD Huesca	Loan
2010-07-01	(Spain) Jokin Esparza	(Spain) CA Osasuna	(Spain) SD Huesca	Loan
2010-07-01	(Argentina) Alberto Costa	(France) Montpellier HSC	(Spain) Valencia CF	€6.5m
2010-07-02	(Brazil) Charles Dias	(Spain) Pontevedra CF	(Spain) Córdoba CF	Free
2010-07-02	(Cape Verde) Dady	(Spain) CA Osasuna	(Turkey) Bucaspor	Free
2010-07-02	(Spain) David Bauzá	(Spain) Gimnàstic de Tarragona	(Spain) SD Huesca	Free
2010-07-02	(Spain) Juanjo Expósito	(Spain) Racing de Santander	(England) Watford	Loan
2010-07-02	(Spain) Miguel Palanca	(Spain) Real Madrid	(Spain) Elche CF	Free
2010-07-02	(Ivory Coast) Yaya Touré	(Spain) FC Barcelona	(England) Manchester City	€32m
2010-07-02	(Portugal) Eliseu	(Italy) S.S. Lazio	(Spain) Málaga CF	€1m
2010-07-02	(Spain) Joan Tomás	(Spain) Villarreal CF B	(Spain) Celta de Vigo	Free
2010-07-02	(Spain) Carlos Peña	(Spain) Recreativo de Huelva	(Spain) Real Valladolid	Free
2010-07-03	(Spain) Salva Sevilla	(Spain) UD Salamanca	(Spain) Real Betis	Free
2010-07-03	(Spain) Jordi Xumetra	(Spain) Girona FC	(Spain) Elche CF	Free
2010-07-04	(Spain) Felip Ortiz	(Spain) Gimnàstic de Tarragona	(Spain) FC Ascó	Free
2010-07-04	(Bosnia and Herzegovina) Haris Medunjanin	(Spain) Real Valladolid	(Israel) Maccabi Tel Aviv	€2m
2010-07-05	(Spain) Vicente Pascual	(Spain) SD Huesca	(Spain) CD Castellón	Free
2010-07-05	(Argentina) Leo Franco	(Turkey) Galatasaray S.K.	(Spain) Real Zaragoza	Free
2010-07-05	(Spain) Marc Valiente	(Spain) Sevilla FC	(Spain) Real Valladolid	Free
2010-07-05	(Spain) Daniel López	(Spain) Albacete Balompié	(Spain) Real Oviedo	Free
2010-07-05	(Sweden) Kennedy Bakircioglü	(Netherlands) AFC Ajax	(Spain) Racing de Santander	Free
2010-07-05	(Spain) Fernando Usero	(Spain) Córdoba CF	(Spain) Elche CF	Free
2010-07-05	(Spain) Toni Doblas	(Spain) SD Huesca	(Spain) Real Zaragoza	Free
2010-07-06	(Ukraine) Dmytro Chyhrynskyi	(Spain) FC Barcelona	(Ukraine) Shakhtar Donetsk	€15m
2010-07-06	(Spain) Alejandro Rebollo	(Spain) CF Palencia	(Spain) FC Cartagena	Free
2010-07-06	(Spain) Xabier Etxeita	(Spain) Athletic Bilbao	(Spain) Elche CF	Free
2010-07-06	(Spain) Jesús Cabrero	(Spain) Albacete Balompié	(Spain) SD Huesca	Free
2010-07-06	(Spain) Mista	(Spain) Deportivo de La Coruña	(Canada) Toronto FC	Free
2010-07-07	(Ecuador) Joffre Guerrón	(Spain) Getafe CF	(Brazil) CA Paranaense	€1.2m
2010-07-07	(Spain) Xavi Torres	(Spain) Málaga CF	(Spain) Levante UD	Loan
2010-07-07	(Spain) Fernando Béjar	(Spain) AD Alcorcón	(Spain) CD Castellón	Free
2010-07-07	(Spain) Víctor Curto	(Spain) CD Alcoyano	(Spain) Girona FC	Free
2010-07-07	(Spain) Bruno Herrero	(Spain) Real Murcia	(Spain) Xerez CD	Free
2010-07-07	(France) Samuel Camille	(Spain) Rayo Vallecano	(Spain) Córdoba CF	Free
2010-07-07	(Uruguay) Sebastián Eguren	(Spain) Villarreal CF	(Spain) Sporting de Gijón	Free
2010-07-08	(Spain) Borja Valero	(England) West Bromwich Albion	(Spain) Villarreal CF	€6m
2010-07-08	(Spain) José Vega	(Spain) Córdoba CF	(Spain) Xerez CD	Free
2010-07-08	(Costa Rica) Keylor Navas	(Costa Rica) Deportivo Saprissa	(Spain) Albacete Balompié	Free
2010-07-08	(Spain) Jagoba Beobide	(Spain) Real Unión	(Spain) Córdoba CF	Free
2010-07-08	(Spain) Manuel Redondo	(Spain) Sevilla Atlético	(Spain) SD Ponferradina	Loan
2010-07-08	(Switzerland) Alexandre Geijo	(Italy) Udinese Calcio	(Spain) Granada CF	Loan
2010-07-08	(Spain) Alan Baró	(Spain) CA Osasuna B	(Spain) Albacete Balompié	Free
2010-07-08	(Italy) Matteo Contini	(Italy) S.S.C. Napoli	(Spain) Real Zaragoza	€2.1m
2010-07-08	(Argentina) Jesús Dátolo	(Italy) S.S.C. Napoli	(Spain) RCD Espanyol	Loan
2010-07-08	(Spain) Iban Zubiaurre	(Spain) Athletic Bilbao	(Spain) Albacete Balompié	Loan
2010-07-09	(Brazil) Keirrison	(Spain) FC Barcelona	(Brazil) Santos FC	Loan
2010-07-09	(France) Dorian Dervite	(England) Tottenham Hotspur	(Spain) Villarreal CF B	Free
2010-07-09	(Cape Verde) Stopira	(Portugal) C.D. Santa Clara	(Spain) Deportivo de La Coruña	Free
2010-07-09	(Spain) Jonathan Rosales	(Spain) Granada CF	(Spain) CD Guijuelo	Loan
2010-07-09	(Spain) Víctor Ibáñez	(Spain) RCD Espanyol	(Spain) CD Castellón	Loan
2010-07-09	(Spain) Rafael Barber	(Spain) Recreativo de Huelva	(Spain) Xerez CD	Free
2010-07-09	(Spain) Pablo Redondo	(Spain) Gimnàstic de Tarragona	(Spain) Xerez CD	Free
2010-07-10	(Argentina) Gonzalo Castellani	(Argentina) Ferro Carril Oeste	(Spain) Villarreal CF B	Free
2010-07-10	(Spain) Marco Luis Pérez	(Spain) Écija Balompié	(Spain) Villarreal CF B	Free
2010-07-10	(Spain) Joan Guillem Truyols	(Spain) RCD Mallorca B	(Spain) Villarreal CF B	Free
2010-07-10	(Argentina) Ariel Ibagaza	(Spain) Villarreal CF	(Greece) Olympiacos	Free
2010-07-11	(Spain) Miguel Martínez	(Spain) SD Huesca	(Spain) Albacete Balompié	Free
2010-07-11	(Spain) Juanma Barrero	(Spain) AD Alcorcón	(Greece) Aris Thessaloniki	Free
2010-07-12	(Spain) Pedro Mosquera	(Spain) Real Madrid Castilla	(Spain) Getafe CF	Free
2010-07-12	(Spain) Andrés Fernández	(Spain) CA Osasuna	(Spain) SD Huesca	Loan
2010-07-12	(Spain) Manu Rubio	(Spain) Caravaca CF	(Spain) FC Cartagena	Free
2010-07-12	(Spain) Miguel Falcón	(Spain) FC Cartagena	(Spain) Real Oviedo	Free
2010-07-12	(Colombia) Luis Muriel	(Italy) Udinese Calcio	(Spain) Granada CF	Loan
2010-07-12	(Brazil) Guilherme Siqueira	(Italy) Udinese Calcio	(Spain) Granada CF	Loan
2010-07-13	(Spain) Jesús Olmo	(Spain) Elche CF	(Spain) CD Puertollano	Free
2010-07-13	(Colombia) Marco Pérez	(Colombia) Boyacá Chicó	(Spain) Real Zaragoza	Loan
2010-07-13	(Spain) Abel Gómez	(Spain) Xerez CD	(Spain) Granada CF	Free
2010-07-13	(Argentina) Facundo Coria	(Argentina) CA Vélez Sársfield	(Spain) Villarreal CF B	Free
2010-07-13	(Spain) Carlos Calvo	(Spain) Xerez CD	(Italy) Udinese Calcio	Free
2010-07-13	(Spain) Anaitz Arbilla	(Spain) Polideportivo Ejido	(Spain) UD Salamanca	Free
2010-07-13	(Argentina) Brian Sarmiento	(Spain) Racing de Santander	(Spain) UD Salamanca	Free
2010-07-13	(Spain) Carlos Calvo	(Italy) Udinese Calcio	(Spain) Granada CF	Loan
2010-07-13	(Spain) Raúl Gañán	(Spain) UD Salamanca	(Spain) SD Eibar	Free
2010-07-14	(Spain) Álex Bergantiños	(Spain) Deportivo de La Coruña	(Spain) Granada CF	Loan
2010-07-14	(Spain) Asen	(Spain) Córdoba CF	(Spain) Albacete Balompié	Free
2010-07-14	(Spain) Rafael Santacruz	(Spain) UB Conquense	(Spain) Albacete Balompié	Free
2010-07-14	(Spain) Javi Casares	(Spain) Granada CF	(Spain) Deportivo Alavés	Free
2010-07-14	(Spain) Andrés González	(Spain) SD Eibar	(Spain) UD Salamanca	Free
2010-07-14	(Uruguay) Matías Alonso	(Spain) Real Murcia Imperial	(Spain) Granada CF	Free
2010-07-14	(Spain) Rafa Martínez	(Spain) UE Rapitenca	(Spain) Granada CF	Free
2010-07-14	(France) Thierry Henry	(Spain) FC Barcelona	(United States) New York Red Bulls	Free
2010-07-14	(Spain) Edu Moya	(Spain) Hércules CF	(Spain) Xerez CD	Free
2010-07-14	(Spain) Aritz Aduriz	(Spain) RCD Mallorca	(Spain) Valencia CF	€4m
2010-07-14	(Spain) Jordi Matamala	(Spain) Girona FC	(Spain) Recreativo de Huelva	Free
2010-07-14	(Spain) Sergio Mantecón	(Spain) CD Castellón	(Spain) Elche CF	Free
2010-07-14	(France) Olivier Thomert	(France) Le Mans FC	(Spain) Hércules CF	Free
2010-07-14	(Spain) Roberto Fernández	(Spain) CA Osasuna	(Spain) Granada CF	Free
2010-07-14	(Spain) Juan Carlos Castilla	(Spain) FC Cartagena	(Spain) CF Palencia	Free
2010-07-14	(Spain) Miquel Martínez	(Spain) UE Lleida	(Spain) Gimnàstic de Tarragona	Free
2010-07-15	(Spain) Javi López	(Spain) Málaga CF	(Spain) SD Ponferradina	Loan
2010-07-15	(France) Grégory Béranger	(Spain) RCD Espanyol	(Spain) CD Tenerife	Free
2010-07-15	(Spain) Pedro León	(Spain) Getafe CF	(Spain) Real Madrid	€10m
2010-07-15	(Spain) Fran Amado	(Spain) AD Ceuta	(Spain) Albacete Balompié	Free
2010-07-15	(Spain) Carlos de Lerma	(Spain) AD Ceuta	(Spain) Albacete Balompié	Free
2010-07-15	(Spain) Natalio Lorenzo	(Spain) UD Almería	(Spain) CD Tenerife	Free
2010-07-15	(Brazil) Guilherme Oliveira	(Spain) UD Almería	(Spain) Real Valladolid	Loan
2010-07-15	(Spain) Héctor Verdés	(Spain) Valencia CF Mestalla	(Spain) Elche CF	Free
2010-07-15	(Spain) Kike Mateo	(Spain) Sporting de Gijón	(Spain) Elche CF	Free
2010-07-15	(Spain) Xisco Hernández	(Spain) RCD Mallorca B	(Spain) Elche CF	Free
2010-07-15	(Spain) Ángel Rodríguez	(Spain) CD Tenerife	(Spain) Elche CF	Free
2010-07-15	(Spain) Cristian García	(Spain) Cádiz CF	(Spain) SD Ponferradina	Free
2010-07-15	(Spain) Fernando Marqués	(Spain) RCD Espanyol	(Italy) Parma FC	Free
2010-07-15	(Spain) Fernando Varela	(Spain) RCD Mallorca	(Turkey) Kasimpasa S.K.	Free
2010-07-16	(Spain) José Antonio Culebras	(Spain) CD Tenerife	(Spain) CD Numancia	Free
2010-07-16	(Spain) Javi Hernández	(Spain) UB Conquense	(Spain) AD Alcorcón	Free
2010-07-16	(Spain) Capi	(Spain) Real Betis	(Spain) Xerez CD	Free
2010-07-16	(Brazil) Adriano Correia	(Spain) Sevilla FC	(Spain) FC Barcelona	€10m
2010-07-16	(Spain) Miguel Pallardó	(Spain) Getafe CF	(Spain) Levante UD	Loan
2010-07-16	(Spain) Oriol Riera	(Spain) Celta de Vigo	(Spain) Córdoba CF	Free
2010-07-16	(Spain) Raúl Fuster	(Spain) Elche CF	(Spain) Gimnàstic de Tarragona	Free
2010-07-16	(Spain) Abraham González	(Spain) Cádiz CF	(Spain) Gimnàstic de Tarragona	Free
2010-07-16	(Argentina) Emiliano Armenteros	(Spain) Sevilla FC	(Spain) Rayo Vallecano	Loan
2010-07-16	(Argentina) Javier Malagueño	(Mexico) Indios de Ciudad Juárez	(Spain) Málaga CF	€0.95m
2010-07-16	(Spain) Dani López	(Spain) UD Las Palmas	(Spain) CD Numancia	Free
2010-07-16	(Spain) Alberto Aguilar	(Spain) Albacete Balompié	(Spain) Córdoba CF	Free
2010-07-16	(Spain) Míchel	(Spain) Xerez CD	(Spain) CD Guadalajara	Free
2010-07-16	(Spain) José Ángel Crespo	(Spain) Sevilla FC	(Italy) Calcio Padova	Free
2010-07-16	(Spain) David Rivas	(Spain) Real Betis	(Romania) FC Vaslui	Free
2010-07-17	(Spain) Rubén Pulido	(Spain) Real Zaragoza	(Turkey) Eskisehirspor	Free
2010-07-17	(Spain) David Rodríguez	(Spain) UD Almería	(Spain) Celta de Vigo	Free
2010-07-17	(Spain) Borja Gómez	(Spain) AD Alcorcón	(Spain) Rayo Vallecano	Free
2010-07-17	(Spain) Óscar Álvarez	(Spain) Girona FC	(Spain) CE L'Hospitalet	Free
2010-07-17	(Spain) Iñigo Sarasola	(Spain) Real Sociedad	(Spain) Real Unión	Loan
2010-07-17	(Spain) Javi Fuego	(Spain) Recreativo de Huelva	(Spain) Rayo Vallecano	Free
2010-07-18	(Spain) Miguel Ángel Luque	(Spain) FC Barcelona B	(Spain) UD Almería	Free
2010-07-18	(Argentina) Matías Fritzler	(Argentina) Club Atlético Lanús	(Spain) Hércules CF	Loan
2010-07-18	(Spain) José Antonio Dorado	(Spain) SD Huesca	(Spain) Real Betis	Free
2010-07-18	(Brazil) Sandro Silva	(Brazil) Palmeiras	(Spain) Málaga CF	€2.2m
2010-07-18	(Spain) Sergio Díaz	(Spain) Hércules CF	(Spain) Gimnàstic de Tarragona	Free
2010-07-18	(Spain) Tonino	(Spain) FC Cartagena	(Spain) CD Leganés	Free
2010-07-18	(Venezuela) Salomón Rondón	(Spain) UD Las Palmas	(Spain) Málaga CF	€3.5m
2010-07-19	(Spain) Xisco Campos	(Spain) Real Murcia	(Spain) Gimnàstic de Tarragona	Free
2010-07-19	(Spain) Jorge Pina	(Spain) Levante UD	(Spain) Albacete Balompié	Free
2010-07-19	(Spain) David Belenguer	(Spain) Getafe CF	(Spain) Real Betis	Free
2010-07-19	(Spain) Raúl Llorente	(Spain) Deportivo Alavés	(Spain) Xerez CD	Free
2010-07-19	(Spain) Jesús Berrocal	(Spain) Granada CF	(Spain) AD Ceuta	Free
2010-07-20	(Brazil) Filipe Luís	(Spain) Deportivo de La Coruña	(Spain) Atlético Madrid	€12m
2010-07-20	(Spain) Juli	(Spain) Elche CF	(Spain) Rayo Vallecano	Free
2010-07-20	(Spain) Edu Albácar	(Spain) Rayo Vallecano	(Spain) Elche CF	Free
2010-07-20	(Spain) José Mari	(Spain) Gimnàstic de Tarragona	(Spain) Xerez CD	Free
2010-07-20	(Spain) Daniel Fragoso	(Spain) Cádiz CF	(Spain) Albacete Balompié	Free
2010-07-20	(Spain) Antonio Sánchez	(Spain) Real Betis B	(Spain) Albacete Balompié	Loan
2010-07-20	(Spain) Damià Abella	(Spain) Real Betis	(Spain) CA Osasuna	Free
2010-07-20	(Spain) Richi	(Spain) CD Tenerife	(Spain) Real Murcia	Free
2010-07-20	(Spain) Rubén Reyes	(Spain) Rayo Vallecano	(Spain) Pontevedra CF	Free
2010-07-21	(Argentina) Diego Valeri	(Portugal) FC Porto	(Spain) UD Almería	Loan
2010-07-21	(Spain) Álvaro Jurado	(Spain) UD Salamanca	(Spain) Cádiz CF	Free
2010-07-21	(Israel) Ben Sahar	(Spain) RCD Espanyol	(Israel) Hapoel Tel Aviv	Loan
2010-07-21	(Spain) David de Coz	(Spain) Real Murcia	(Spain) Córdoba CF	Free
2010-07-21	(Spain) Asier Goiria	(Spain) CD Numancia	(Spain) FC Cartagena	Free
2010-07-21	(Spain) Luis Prieto	(Spain) Real Valladolid	(Spain) SD Ponferradina	Free
2010-07-21	(Spain) Isidro del Río	(Spain) CD Numancia	(Spain) Barakaldo CF	Free
2010-07-21	(Spain) David Lombán	(Spain) Valencia CF	(Spain) Xerez CD	Free
2010-07-22	(Spain) Pablo Amo	(Spain) Real Zaragoza	(Greece) Panserraikos F.C.	Free
2010-07-22	(Spain) Chico	(Spain) UD Almería	(Italy) Genoa C.F.C.	€5m
2010-07-22	(Spain) Sergio González	(Spain) Deportivo de La Coruña	(Spain) Levante UD	Free
2010-07-22	(Serbia) Milan Smiljanic	(Spain) RCD Espanyol	(Serbia) FK Partizan	Loan
2010-07-22	(Spain) Roberto García	(Spain) Gimnàstic de Tarragona	(Spain) SD Huesca	Free
2010-07-22	(Spain) Luis Delgado	(Spain) UE Sant Andreu	(Spain) Girona FC	Free
2010-07-22	(Spain) Albert Serra	(Spain) Levante UD	(Spain) Girona FC	Free
2010-07-22	(Argentina) Mariano Barbosa	(Mexico) Club Atlas	(Spain) UD Las Palmas	Free
2010-07-23	(Colombia) Abel Aguilar	(Italy) Udinese Calcio	(Spain) Hércules CF	€1.5m
2010-07-23	(Spain) Julio Álvarez	(Spain) RCD Mallorca	(Spain) CD Tenerife	Free
2010-07-23	(Argentina) Mariano Pavone	(Spain) Real Betis	(Argentina) C.A. River Plate	Loan
2010-07-23	(Spain) Rafita	(Spain) CD Castellón	(Spain) Recreativo de Huelva	Free
2010-07-23	(Spain) Manu Herrera	(Spain) Levante UD	(Spain) AD Alcorcón	Free
2010-07-23	(Spain) Juan José Pereira	(Spain) Albacete Balompié	(Spain) CD San Roque de Lepe	Free
2010-07-23	(Spain) Héctor Yuste	(Spain) FC Cartagena	(Spain) UD Salamanca	Free
2010-07-23	(Spain) Iván Pérez	(Spain) Deportivo de La Coruña B	(Spain) SD Ponferradina	Loan
2010-07-23	(Spain) Javi Guerra	(Spain) RCD Mallorca	(Spain) Real Valladolid	€0.3m
2010-07-23	(Spain) Sergio García	(Spain) Real Valladolid	(Spain) UD Salamanca	Free
2010-07-24	(Brazil) Pedro Botelho	(England) Arsenal	(Spain) FC Cartagena	Loan
2010-07-24	(Spain) Jairo Álvarez	(Spain) Deportivo de La Coruña	(Spain) CF Palencia	Free
2010-07-24	(Spain) Nacho Fernádnez	(Spain) SD Ponferradina	(Spain) UD Logroñés	Free
2010-07-24	(Uruguay) Marcelo Silva	(Uruguay) Danubio FC	(Spain) UD Almería	€1.3m
2010-07-24	(Spain) Manolo Martínez	(Spain) CD Tenerife	(Spain) Recreativo de Huelva	Free
2010-07-25	(Spain) Antonio Amaya	(England) Wigan Athletic	(Spain) Rayo Vallecano	Loan
2010-07-25	(Spain) Guti	(Spain) Real Madrid	(Turkey) Beşiktaş J.K.	Free
2010-07-26	(Spain) Rubén Pérez	(Spain) Atlético Madrid	(Spain) Deportivo de La Coruña	Loan
2010-07-26	(Spain) Francisco Molinero	(Romania) FC Dinamo București	(Spain) SD Huesca	Free
2010-07-26	(Spain) Ángel Sánchez	(Spain) Levante UD	(Spain) AD Alcorcón	Free
2010-07-26	(Spain) Toni Vela	(Spain) Villarreal CF	(Spain) CD Badajoz	Loan
2010-07-26	(Spain) Raúl González	(Spain) Real Madrid	(Germany) FC Schalke 04	Free
2010-07-26	(Colombia) José Julián de la Cuesta	(Spain) Cádiz CF	(Spain) Albacete Balompié	Free
2010-07-26	(Spain) Óscar Díaz	(Spain) RCD Mallorca	(Spain) Xerez CD	Free
2010-07-26	(Spain) Carlos Martínez	(Spain) CD Leganés	(Spain) AD Alcorcón	Free
2010-07-26	(Spain) Iñaki Muñoz	(Spain) Athletic Bilbao	(Spain) FC Cartagena	Free
2010-07-26	(Brazil) Henrique	(Spain) FC Barcelona	(Spain) Racing de Santander	Loan
2010-07-26	(Spain) Jandro	(Spain) Elche CF	(Spain) Girona FC	Free
2010-07-26	(Romania) Ionel Danciulescu	(Spain) Hércules CF	(Romania) FC Dinamo București	Free
2010-07-27	(Netherlands) Jonathan de Guzmán	(Netherlands) Feyenoord	(Spain) RCD Mallorca	Free
2010-07-27	(Spain) Juan Antonio Osado	(Spain) Gimnàstic de Tarragona	(Spain) UD Logroñés	Free
2010-07-27	(Ghana) Aziz Tetteh	(Italy) Udinese Calcio	(Spain) Granada CF	Free
2010-07-27	(Ghana) Jonathan Mensah	(Italy) Udinese Calcio	(Spain) Granada CF	Loan
2010-07-27	(Ghana) Aziz Tetteh	(Spain) Granada CF	(Spain) CD Leganés	Loan
2010-07-27	(Spain) Miguel Ángel Cordero	(Spain) Real Madrid Castilla	(Spain) Xerez CD	Free
2010-07-27	(Brazil) Felipe Mattioni	(Spain) RCD Mallorca	(Spain) RCD Espanyol	Free
2010-07-27	(Spain) Pere Martí	(Spain) Málaga CF	(Spain) CD Castellón	Free
2010-07-28	(Spain) José Moratón	(Spain) Racing de Santander	(Spain) UD Salamanca	Free
2010-07-28	(Spain) Raúl Moreno	(Spain) CD Leganés	(Spain) AD Alcorcón	Free
2010-07-28	(Uruguay) Sebastián Fernández	(Argentina) CA Banfield	(Spain) Málaga CF	€4m
2010-07-28	(Spain) David Prieto	(Spain) Sevilla FC	(Spain) CD Tenerife	Free
2010-07-29	(Uruguay) Christian Stuani	(Italy) Reggina Calcio	(Spain) Levante UD	Loan
2010-07-29	(Spain) Iago Falqué	(Italy) Juventus FC	(Spain) Villarreal CF B	Loan
2010-07-29	(Spain) Jorge Alonso	(Spain) Hércules CF	(Spain) Real Valladolid	Free
2010-07-29	(Spain) Íñigo López	(Spain) AD Alcorcón	(Spain) Granada CF	Free
2010-07-29	(Chile) Fabián Orellana	(Italy) Udinese Calcio	(Spain) Granada CF	Loan
2010-07-29	(Spain) Alberto Marcos	(Spain) Real Valladolid	(Spain) SD Huesca	Free
2010-07-29	(Spain) Miguel Ángel Lozano	(Spain) Málaga CF	(Spain) SD Ponferradina	Free
2010-07-29	(Brazil) Rodrigo Galatto	(Brazil) Atlético Paranaense	(Spain) Málaga CF	€1.2m
2010-07-30	(Argentina) Nicolás Pareja	(Spain) RCD Espanyol	(Russia) FC Spartak Moscow	€10m
2010-07-30	(Germany) Sami Khedira	(Germany) VfB Stuttgart	(Spain) Real Madrid	€12m
2010-07-30	(Spain) José Maldonado	(Spain) Sporting de Gijón	(Spain) FC Cartagena	Free
2010-07-30	(Spain) David Cortés	(Spain) Getafe CF	(Spain) Hércules CF	Free
2010-07-30	(Colombia) Brayan Angulo	(Portugal) Leixões S.C.	(Spain) Rayo Vallecano	Loan
2010-07-30	(Spain) Álvaro Cámara	(Spain) Granada CF	(Spain) Real Murcia	Free
2010-07-30	(Angola) Manucho	(Spain) Real Valladolid	(Turkey) Bucaspor	Loan
2010-07-30	(Belgium) Tom de Mul	(Spain) Sevilla FC	(Belgium) Standard Liège	Loan
2010-07-30	(Spain) Neru	(Spain) SD Huesca	(Spain) Pontevedra CF	Free´
2010-07-31	(Mexico) Rafael Márquez	(Spain) FC Barcelona	(United States) New York Red Bulls	Free
2010-07-31	(Spain) Ángel Martínez	(Spain) RCD Espanyol	(Spain) Girona FC	Loan
2010-07-31	(Spain) Daniel Carril	(Spain) Levante UD	(Spain) UD Las Palmas	Free
2010-07-31	(Spain) Raúl Tamudo	(Spain) RCD Espanyol	(Spain) Real Sociedad	Free
2010-07-31	(Spain) Germán Beltrán	(Spain) Girona FC	(Spain) Zamora CF	Free
2010-08-01	(Spain) Carlos Marchena	(Spain) Valencia CF	(Spain) Villarreal CF	€2.2m
2010-08-02	(Spain) Miguel García	(Spain) UD Las Palmas	(Spain) UD Salamanca	Free
2010-08-02	(Spain) Adrián Colunga	(Spain) Recreativo de Huelva	(Spain) Getafe CF	€2m
2010-08-02	(Spain) Kepa Blanco	(Spain) Getafe CF	(Spain) Recreativo de Huelva	Free
2010-08-02	(Spain) Moisés García	(Spain) SD Huesca	(Spain) CD La Muela	Free
2010-08-02	(Spain) Rubén Castro	(Spain) Deportivo de La Coruña	(Spain) Real Betis	€1.5m
2010-08-02	(France) Jean Sylvain Babin	(Spain) Lucena CF	(Spain) AD Alcorcón	Free
2010-08-02	(Italy) Luca Cigarini	(Italy) S.S.C. Napoli	(Spain) Sevilla FC	Loan
2010-08-02	(Spain) Juan Belencoso	(Spain) Albacete Balompié	(Spain) UB Conquense	Free
2010-08-03	(Spain) Ernesto Gómez	(Spain) AD Alcorcón	(Spain) CD Guadalajara	Free
2010-08-03	(Nigeria) Kabiru Akinsola	(Spain) UD Salamanca	(Spain) Zamora CF	Loan
2010-08-03	(Spain) Yuri Berchiche	(Spain) Real Valladolid	(Spain) Real Unión	Free
2010-08-03	(Argentina) Román Martínez	(Spain) RCD Espanyol	(Mexico) UANL Tigres	Loan
2010-08-03	(Spain) Antonio Calle	(Spain) Girona FC	(Spain) Real Valladolid	Free
2010-08-03	(Spain) Gerardo Berodia	(Spain) SD Ponferradina	(Spain) UB Conquense	Free
2010-08-04	(Spain) Jonathan Sesma	(Spain) Real Valladolid	(Spain) Córdoba CF	Free
2010-08-04	(Serbia) Ranko Despotovic	(Spain) Real Murcia	(Spain) Girona FC	Free
2010-08-04	(Spain) Martín Ortega	(Spain) Granada CF	(Spain) CD Leganés	Free
2010-08-04	(Romania) Cristian Pulhac	(Romania) FC Dinamo București	(Spain) Hércules CF	Loan
2010-08-04	(Uruguay) Diego Godín	(Spain) Villarreal CF	(Spain) Atlético Madrid	€8m
2010-08-04	(Spain) Jofre Mateu	(Spain) Rayo Vallecano	(Spain) Real Valladolid	Free
2010-08-04	(Spain) Jorge Molino	(Spain) Atlético Madrid	(Spain) Real Murcia	Loan
2010-08-04	(Democratic Republic of the Congo) Cedric Mabwati	(Spain) Atlético Madrid	(Spain) CD Numancia	Free
2010-08-04	(Spain) Joaquín Álvarez	(Spain) CD Leganés	(Spain) AD Alcorcón	Free
2010-08-05	(Spain) Guille Roldán	(Spain) Albacete Balompié	(Spain) UD Melilla	Free
2010-08-05	(Spain) Jaume Costa	(Spain) Cádiz CF	(Spain) Villarreal CF B	Free
2010-08-05	(Spain) Fernando Sales	(Spain) Albacete Balompié	(Spain) AD Alcorcón	Free
2010-08-05	(Spain) Francisco Montañés	(Spain) Ontinyent CF	(Spain) AD Alcorcón	Free
2010-08-05	(Spain) David Sánchez	(Romania) FC Timişoara	(Spain) Elche CF	Free
2010-08-05	(Spain) Marcos Márquez	(Spain) UD Las Palmas	(Spain) UD Salamanca	Free
2010-08-06	(Brazil) Bruno Perone	(Brazil) Figueirense	(Spain) Xerez CD	Loan
2010-08-06	(Uruguay) Gustavo Munúa	(Spain) Málaga CF	(Spain) Levante UD	Free
2010-08-06	(Spain) Sergio Pelegrín	(Spain) Rayo Vallecano	(Spain) Elche CF	Free
2010-08-06	(Spain) Juan Quero	(Spain) Rayo Vallecano	(Spain) Elche CF	Free
2010-08-06	(Argentina) Nicolás Bertolo	(Italy) U.S. Palermo	(Spain) Real Zaragoza	Loan
2010-08-06	(Spain) Abraham Minero	(Spain) UE Sant Andreu	(Spain) FC Barcelona B	Free
2010-08-06	(Spain) Cristian Tello	(Spain) RCD Espanyol B	(Spain) FC Barcelona B	Free
2010-08-06	(Spain) Manuel Rueda	(Spain) UE Sant Andreu	(Spain) AD Alcorcón	Free
2010-08-08	(Spain) Mario Rosas	(Spain) Real Murcia	(Spain) UD Salamanca	Free
2010-08-09	(Spain) Álvaro del Moral	(Spain) Levante UD	(Spain) UD Logroñés	Free
2010-08-09	(Spain) Samuel Baños	(Spain) Levante UD	(Spain) AD Alcorcón	Free
2010-08-09	(Spain) José Luis Capdevila	(Spain) Real Murcia	(Spain) Xerez CD	Free
2010-08-09	(Spain) Francisco Javier Lledó	(Spain) CD Castellón	(Spain) Xerez CD	Free
2010-08-10	(Spain) Marco Navas	(Spain) CD Guadalajara	(Spain) SD Huesca	Free
2010-08-10	(Spain) Iosu Esnaola	(Spain) Real Sociedad	(Spain) Real Unión	Loan
2010-08-10	(Spain) Marc Mateu	(Spain) Levante UD	(Spain) Real Unión	Loan
2010-08-10	(Spain) Manu Gavilán	(Spain) Real Betis	(Italy) Bologna F.C. 1909	€0.36m
2010-08-10	(Portugal) Ricardo Carvalho	(England) Chelsea	(Spain) Real Madrid	€8m
2010-08-10	(Spain) Gerard Autet	(Spain) Sporting de Gijón	(Spain) Xerez CD	Free
2010-08-10	(Spain) Gerardo Noriega	(Spain) Hércules CF	(Spain) Gimnàstic de Tarragona	Free
2010-08-11	(Spain) José Jesús Perera	(Spain) Rayo Vallecano	(Spain) Elche CF	Free
2010-08-11	(Spain) Roberto Platero	(Spain) CD Numancia	(Spain) Polideportivo Ejido	Loan
2010-08-11	(Spain) Roberto Santamaría	(Spain) UD Las Palmas	(Spain) Girona FC	€0.5m
2010-08-11	(Spain) Juan Ochoa	(Spain) Real Murcia	(Spain) SD Huesca	Free
2010-08-12	(Argentina) Mauro Quiroga	(Argentina) Gimnasia de Concepción de Uruguay	(Spain) UD Las Palmas	Loan
2010-08-12	(Spain) Paco Esteban	(Spain) Elche CF	(Spain) Ontinyent CF	Free
2010-08-12	(Spain) Asier Arranz	(Spain) CD Numancia	(Spain) Pontevedra CF	Loan
2010-08-12	(Spain) Saúl Berjón	(Spain) UD Las Palmas	(Spain) FC Barcelona B	€0.3m
2010-08-12	(Bolivia) Samuel Galindo	(England) Arsenal	(Spain) Córdoba CF	Loan
2010-08-12	(Spain) Felipe Ramos	(Spain) Real Madrid Castilla	(Spain) Deportivo de La Coruña	Free
2010-08-13	(Spain) Marcos Tébar	(Spain) Real Madrid Castilla	(Spain) Girona FC	Free
2010-08-13	(Spain) Javi Castellano	(Spain) RCD Mallorca	(Spain) Real Unión	Loan
2010-08-13	(Spain) Javier Herreros	(Spain) Córdoba CF	(Spain) UD Melilla	Free
2010-08-13	(Argentina) Ariel Nahuelpan	(Brazil) Coritiba	(Spain) Racing de Santander	Free
2010-08-13	(Uruguay) Diego Ifrán	(Uruguay) Danubio	(Spain) Real Sociedad	€1.5m
2010-08-13	(Spain) Valdo	(Spain) RCD Espanyol	(Spain) Levante UD	Free
2010-08-13	(Spain) Melli	(Spain) Real Betis	(Spain) CD Tenerife	Free
2010-08-13	(Uruguay) Leandro Cabrera	(Spain) Atlético Madrid	(Spain) Recreativo de Huelva	Loan
2010-08-13	(Spain) Iñigo Díaz de Cerio	(Spain) Athletic Bilbao	(Spain) Córdoba CF	Loan
2010-08-14	(Ghana) Quincy Owusu-Abeyie	(Qatar) Al-Sadd Sports Club	(Spain) Málaga CF	Loan
2010-08-14	(Portugal) Tiago Mendes	(Italy) Juventus FC	(Spain) Atlético Madrid	Loan
2010-08-15	(Argentina) Óscar Trejo	(Spain) RCD Mallorca	(Spain) Rayo Vallecano	Loan
2010-08-15	(Spain) Sergio García	(Spain) Real Betis	(Spain) RCD Espanyol	€1.8m
2010-08-16	(Spain) Aarón Ñíguez	(Spain) Valencia CF	(Spain) Recreativo de Huelva	Free
2010-08-17	(Spain) Jordi Pablo	(Spain) Málaga CF	(Spain) FC Cartagena	Loan
2010-08-17	(Paraguay) Nelson Valdez	(Germany) Borussia Dortmund	(Spain) Hércules CF	€3.8m
2010-08-17	(Germany) Mesut Özil	(Germany) SV Werder Bremen	(Spain) Real Madrid	€15m
2010-08-17	(Spain) Daniel Toribio	(Spain) Málaga CF	(Spain) SD Ponferradina	Loan
2010-08-17	(Spain) Carlos Carmona	(Spain) Recreativo de Huelva	(Spain) FC Barcelona B	Free
2010-08-17	(Spain) Juanmi Callejón	(Spain) RCD Mallorca	(Spain) Córdoba CF	Free
2010-08-17	(Spain) Nano	(Spain) Real Betis	(Spain) Levante UD	Free
2010-08-18	(Spain) Rodri	(Spain) Hércules CF	(Spain) Gimnàstic de Tarragona	Free
2010-08-18	(Spain) Miguel Ángel Tena	(Spain) Elche CF	(Spain) Córdoba CF	Free
2010-08-18	(Spain) David Fuster	(Spain) Villarreal CF	(Greece) Olympiacos	Free
2010-08-18	(Greece) Alexandros Tziolis	(Italy) A.C. Siena	(Spain) Racing de Santander	Loan
2010-08-18	(Senegal) Mohamed Sarr	(Belgium) Standard Liège	(Spain) Hércules CF	€0.3m
2010-08-19	(Spain) Ander Murillo	(Spain) Athletic Bilbao	(Spain) Celta de Vigo	Free
2010-08-19	(Spain) Fabricio Agosto	(Spain) Real Valladolid	(Spain) Recreativo de Huelva	Free
2010-08-19	(Spain) David Cañas	(Spain) Girona FC	(Spain) AD Ceuta	Free
2010-08-19	(Montenegro) Andrija Delibašic	(Spain) Hércules CF	(Spain) Rayo Vallecano	Free
2010-08-19	(Argentina) Eduardo Salvio	(Spain) Atlético Madrid	(Portugal) S.L. Benfica	Loan
2010-08-19	(Spain) Javi Venta	(Spain) Villarreal CF	(Spain) Levante UD	Free
2010-08-19	(Spain) Adrián González	(Spain) Getafe CF	(Spain) Racing de Santander	Free
2010-08-20	(Spain) Sergio Pachón	(Spain) Rayo Vallecano	(Spain) Cádiz CF	Free
2010-08-20	(Spain) Toni Moral	(Spain) Racing de Santander	(Spain) FC Cartagena	Free
2010-08-20	(Spain) Francisco Noguerol	(Spain) Celta de Vigo	(Spain) Girona FC	Free
2010-08-20	(Brazil) Pablo de Barros	(Spain) Real Zaragoza	(Brazil) Cruzeiro	Loan
2010-08-21	(Paraguay) Nelson Cuevas	(Paraguay) Club Olimpia	(Spain) Albacete Balompié	Free
2010-08-21	(Japan) Hiroshi Ibusuki	(Spain) Girona FC	(Spain) CE Sabadell FC	Loan
2010-08-21	(Spain) Asier del Horno	(Spain) Valencia CF	(Spain) Levante UD	Loan
2010-08-21	(Uruguay) Ignacio González	(Spain) Valencia CF	(Spain) Levante UD	Loan
2010-08-22	(Spain) Miguel Linares	(Spain) UD Salamanca	(Spain) Elche CF	€0.2m
2010-08-22	(Uruguay) Javier Chevantón	(Spain) Sevilla FC	(Italy) U.S. Lecce	Free
2010-08-22	(Paraguay) Claudio Morel Rodríguez	(Argentina) Boca Juniors	(Spain) Deportivo de La Coruña	Free
2010-08-22	(Netherlands) Jeffrey Sarpong	(Netherlands) AFC Ajax	(Spain) Real Sociedad	Free
2010-08-22	(France) Sébastien Squillaci	(Spain) Sevilla FC	(England) Arsenal	Free
2010-08-23	(Norway) Knut Olav Rindarøy	(Norway) Molde FK	(Spain) Deportivo de La Coruña	Loan
2010-08-23	(Spain) Lolo	(Spain) Sevilla FC	(Spain) CA Osasuna	Free
2010-08-23	(Spain) Moisés Hurtado	(Spain) RCD Espanyol	(Greece) Olympiacos F.C.	€2m
2010-08-24	(Spain) Alexis	(Spain) Valencia CF	(Spain) Sevilla FC	€5m
2010-08-24	(Portugal) Mano	(Portugal) C.F. Os Belenenses	(Spain) Villarreal CF B	Free
2010-08-24	(Netherlands) Piet Velthuizen	(Netherlands) Vitesse Arnhem	(Spain) Hércules CF	€0.5m
2010-08-24	(Spain) Gaizka Saizar	(Spain) CD Tenerife	(Spain) SD Ponferradina	Free
2010-08-25	(Spain) Jordi Figueras	(Russia) FC Rubin Kazan	(Spain) Real Valladolid	Loan
2010-08-25	(Spain) Juanjo Expósito	(Spain) Racing de Santander	(Spain) UD Salamanca	Free
2010-08-25	(Spain) Iván Cuadrado	(Spain) Rayo Vallecano	(Spain) SD Ponferradina	Free
2010-08-25	(Spain) Francis Suárez	(Spain) UD Las Palmas	(Spain) SD Ponferradina	Loan
2010-08-25	(Brazil) Rovérsio	(Spain) CA Osasuna	(Spain) Real Betis	Loan
2010-08-26	(Hungary) Ádám Pintér	(Hungary) MTK Budapest FC	(Spain) Real Zaragoza	Free
2010-08-26	(Spain) Víctor Sánchez	(Spain) FC Barcelona	(Spain) Getafe CF	Loan
2010-08-26	(Spain) Dani Bautista	(Spain) Hércules CF	(Spain) Girona FC	Free
2010-08-26	(Spain) Juanma Marrero	(Spain) Rayo Vallecano	(Spain) Real Oviedo	Free
2010-08-26	(Argentina) Fernando Cavenaghi	(France) FC Girondins de Bordeaux	(Spain) RCD Mallorca	Loan
2010-08-26	(Brazil) Edson Ramos	(Uzbekistan) FC Bunyodkor	(Spain) RCD Mallorca	Free
2010-08-26	(Brazil) João Victor	(Uzbekistan) FC Bunyodkor	(Spain) RCD Mallorca	Free
2010-08-26	(Portugal) Julien Fernandes	(Portugal) Vitória F.C.	(Spain) FC Cartagena	Free
2010-08-26	(Turkey) Mehmet Aurelio	(Spain) Real Betis	(Turkey) Beşiktaş J.K.	Free
2010-08-26	(France) Ludovic Delporte	(Spain) CA Osasuna	(Spain) Gimnàstic de Tarragona	Free
2010-08-26	(Netherlands) Berry Powel	(Netherlands) ADO Den Haag	(Spain) Gimnàstic de Tarragona	Free
2010-08-26	(Spain) Jonathan Ñíguez	(Spain) Ontinyent CF	(Spain) UD Las Palmas	Free
2010-08-26	(Spain) Jonathan Ñíguez	(Spain) UD Las Palmas	(Spain) CD Mirandés	Loan
2010-08-27	(Argentina) Javier Mascherano	(England) Liverpool	(Spain) FC Barcelona	€22m
2010-08-27	(Colombia) Edixon Perea	(Brazil) Grêmio	(Spain) UD Las Palmas	Free
2010-08-27	(Senegal) Ibrahima Baldé	(Spain) Atlético Madrid	(Spain) CD Numancia	Loan
2010-08-27	(Spain) Jaume Sobregrau	(Spain) FC Barcelona B	(Spain) CD San Roque de Lepe	Free
2010-08-27	(France) Sinama Pongolle	(Portugal) Sporting CP	(Spain) Real Zaragoza	Loan
2010-08-27	(Spain) Marcos García	(Spain) Real Valladolid	(Spain) Villarreal CF B	Loan
2010-08-27	(Spain) José Antonio Picón	(Spain) Racing de Santander	(Spain) Pontevedra CF	Loan
2010-08-28	(Spain) Iván Amaya	(Spain) Granada CF	(Spain) Real Murcia	Free
2010-08-28	(Ivory Coast) Lago Júnior	(Spain) CD Numancia	(Spain) SD Eibar	Loan
2010-08-28	(Sweden) Zlatan Ibrahimović	(Spain) FC Barcelona	(Italy) A.C. Milan	Loan
2010-08-28	(Spain) José Serrano	(Spain) Rayo Vallecano	(Spain) Cádiz CF	Free
2010-08-29	(France) David Trezeguet	(Italy) Juventus FC	(Spain) Hércules CF	Free
2010-08-29	(Uruguay) Martín Cáceres	(Spain) FC Barcelona	(Spain) Sevilla FC	Loan
2010-08-29	(Spain) Biel Medina	(Spain) Gimnàstic de Tarragona	(Cyprus) Anorthosis Famagusta FC	Loan
2010-08-29	(Equatorial Guinea) Rodolfo Bodipo	(Spain) Deportivo de La Coruña	(Spain) Elche CF	Loan
2010-08-30	(Cape Verde) Nélson Marcos	(Spain) Real Betis	(Spain) CA Osasuna	Loan
2010-08-30	(Spain) Nino Ibarra	(Spain) SD Ponferradina	(Spain) AD Alcorcón	Free
2010-08-30	(Paraguay) Javier Acuña	(Spain) Real Madrid Castilla	(Spain) Recreativo de Huelva	Free
2010-08-30	(Argentina) Aldo Duscher	(Spain) Sevilla FC	(Spain) RCD Espanyol	Free
2010-08-30	(Uruguay) Pablo Pintos	(Italy) S.S. Lazio	(Spain) Getafe CF	Free
2010-08-30	(Spain) Jesús Tato	(Spain) FC Cartagena	(Spain) Albacete Balompié	Free
2010-08-30	(Spain) Rubén Martínez	(Spain) FC Cartagena	(Spain) Málaga CF	€1.3m
2010-08-31	(Spain) José Manuel Jurado	(Spain) Atlético Madrid	(Germany) FC Schalke 04	€13m
2010-08-31	(Chile) Waldo Ponce	(Chile) C.D. O'Higgins	(Spain) Racing de Santander	Loan
2010-08-31	(Spain) Héctor Font	(Spain) Real Valladolid	(Spain) Xerez CD	Loan
2010-08-31	(Spain) Kiko Casilla	(Spain) RCD Espanyol	(Spain) FC Cartagena	Loan
2010-08-31	(Spain) Cala	(Spain) Sevilla FC	(Spain) FC Cartagena	Loan
2010-08-31	(Spain) Keko	(Spain) Atlético Madrid	(Spain) FC Cartagena	Loan
2010-08-31	(Spain) Joseba del Olmo	(Spain) Hércules CF	(Spain) SD Ponferradina	Loan
2010-08-31	(Spain) Diego Cascón	(Spain) AD Alcorcón	(Spain) SD Eibar	Free
2010-08-31	(Spain) Mikel Rico	(Spain) SD Huesca	(Italy) Udinese Calcio	€0.6m
2010-08-31	(Spain) Mikel Rico	(Italy) Udinese Calcio	(Spain) Granada CF	Loan
2010-08-31	(Spain) Ion Echaide	(Spain) CA Osasuna	(Spain) SD Huesca	Loan
2010-08-31	(Spain) Raúl Goni	(Spain) Real Zaragoza	(Spain) Real Madrid Castilla	Loan
2010-08-31	(Ghana) Ransford Osei	(Israel) Maccabi Haifa	(Spain) Granada CF	Free
2010-08-31	(Belarus) Alexander Hleb	(Spain) FC Barcelona	(England) Birmingham City	Loan
2010-08-31	(Lithuania) Marius Stankevicius	(Italy) U.C. Sampdoria	(Spain) Valencia CF	Loan
2010-08-31	(Denmark) Kris Stadsgaard	(Norway) Rosenborg BK	(Spain) Málaga CF	€2m
2010-08-31	(Spain) Alberto Bueno	(Spain) Real Valladolid	(England) Derby County	Loan
2010-08-31	(Spain) David González	(Spain) Málaga CF	(Spain) Cádiz CF	Loan
2010-08-31	(Netherlands) Rafael van der Vaart	(Spain) Real Madrid	(England) Tottenham Hotspur	€10m
2010-08-31	(Netherlands) Royston Drenthe	(Spain) Real Madrid	(Spain) Hércules CF	Loan
2010-08-31	(Italy) Pablo Osvaldo	(Italy) Bologna F.C. 1909	(Spain) RCD Espanyol	€5m
2010-08-31	(Bosnia and Herzegovina) Eldin Hadžic	(Spain) Hércules CF	(Spain) SD Eibar	Loan
2010-08-31	(Ecuador) Felipe Caicedo	(England) Manchester City	(Spain) Levante UD	Loan
2010-08-31	(Denmark) Nicki Bille Nielsen	(Denmark) FC Nordsjælland	(Spain) Villarreal CF B	Free
2010-08-31	(England) Jermaine Pennant	(Spain) Real Zaragoza	(England) Stoke City	Loan
2010-08-31	(Spain) Francisco Pavón	(Spain) Real Zaragoza	(France) AC Arles-Avignon	Free
2010-08-31	(Burundi) Mohammed Tchité	(Spain) Racing de Santander	(Belgium) Standard Liège	€1.7m
2010-08-31	(Sweden) Markus Rosenberg	(Germany) SV Werder Bremen	(Spain) Racing de Santander	Loan
2010-08-31	(Guinea) Alhassane Keita	(Spain) RCD Mallorca	(Spain) Real Valladolid	Loan
2010-08-31	(Portugal) Miguel Lopes	(Portugal) FC Porto	(Spain) Real Betis	Loan
2010-08-31	(Spain) Manuel Ruz	(Spain) Hércules CF	(Spain) Gimnàstic de Tarragona	Free
2010-08-31	(Spain) Óscar González	(Greece) Olympiacos F.C.	(Spain) Real Valladolid	Free
2010-08-31	(Democratic Republic of the Congo) Trésor Kandol	(England) Leeds United	(Spain) Albacete Balompié	Free

== See also ==
- List of Spanish football transfers winter 2010–11
