= 2012 Segunda División play-offs =

Segunda División play-offs
- Season: 2011–12
- Promoted: Valladolid
- Matches: 6
- Goals: 8 (1.33 per match)

The 2012 Segunda División play-offs took place in June 2012. The Segunda División promotion phase (known as Promoción de ascenso) was the second phase of 2011–12 Segunda División and was to determine the third team which promoted to 2012–13 La Liga. Teams placed between 3rd and 6th position (excluding reserve teams) took part in the promotion play-offs.

Regulations were similar that previous season: fifth placed faced against the fourth, while the sixth positioned team faced against the third. In case of a tied eliminatory there were extra time, once finished it, this season introduced that there wouldn't be penalty shoot-out and the winner would be the best positioned team. The first leg of the semi-finals was played on 6 June with the best positioned team playing at home the second leg was played on 10 June. The final was also two-legged, with the first leg on 13 June and the second leg on 16 June, with the best positioned team also playing at home the second leg. Real Valladolid and AD Alcorcón played the final phase where Valladolid was winner and promoted to La Liga after two years of absence. Córdoba CF and Hércules CF were eliminated in semifinals.

== Road to the play-offs ==
=== League table ===
Pos	Team	Pld	W	D	L	GF	GA	GD	Pts	Qualification
3	Valladolid	42	23	13	6	69	37	+32	82	Promotion play-offs
4	Alcorcón	42	21	10	11	58	42	+16	73	Promotion play-offs
5	Hércules	42	22	6	14	62	43	+19	72	Promotion play-offs
6	Córdoba	42	20	11	11	52	43	+9	71	Promotion play-offs

Source: LFP - Liga Adelante
Rules for classification: 1st points; 2nd head-to-head points; 3rd head-to-head goal difference; 4th head-to-head goals scored; 5th goal difference; 6th number of goals scored; 7th Fair-play points

=== Valladolid ===
Real Valladolid was the only team to be assured a spot in this phase several matchdays before, doing so on 16 May 2012. They were fighting together with Celta de Vigo for the second place to earn direct promotion, and eventually repeated the play-off appearance from the previous season.

An historical La Liga team, Valladolid made solid regular season (82 points), fighting with Celta for the remaining place for direct promotion. However, after a draw in the penultimate match against AD Alcorcón (which was also fighting for a play-off spot) they didn't depend by himself for direct promotion: Celta played last round against Córdoba CF, both only needed a draw, and drew 0–0 as their opponents were also favoured by that outcome; foreseeing this situation, Valladolid didn't try to opt for the second place and lost the last match 1–3 at home against CD Guadalajara.

Valladolid's last participation in La Liga was in 2009–10. Valladolid spent 40 seasons in the top division: from 1948–64 except 1958–59 and 1961–62, and from 1980–2004 except 1992–93, and lately from 2007–10. It ranked 14th in the all-time La Liga table (Racing de Santander surpassed it after 2011–12 La Liga). They were in the category since 2010–11.

Background at 2011–12 Segunda División:

Round	2	3	4	5	6	7	8	9	10	1	11	12	13	14	15	16	17	18	19	20	21	22	23	24	25	26	27	28	29	31	32	33	34	35	36	37	38	39	40	30	41	42
Home/Away	A	H	A	H	A	H	A	A	H	H	A	H	A	H	A	H	A	H	A	H	A	A	H	A	H	A	H	A	H	A	H	A	H	A	H	A	H	A	H	H	A	H
Result	W	W	D	L	D	W	D	D	W	W	L	W	D	W	D	D	D	W	W	D	W	W	W	L	W	L	L	W	D	W	W	W	W	W	W	D	D	W	W	W	D	L
Position	2	1	3	8	9	6	5	6	4	3	5	4	4	2	2	3	4	4	4	4	2	2	2	3	3	4	3	3	3	3	3	3	2	2	2	2	3	3	3	3	3	3

=== Alcorcón ===
AD Alcorcón qualified to the playoffs in the last matchday (3 June 2012), like Hércules CF and Córdoba, after winning 1–0 away against CD Numancia.

Alcorcón was then a "modest team" that since its foundation in 1971 had spent in the lower leagues until 2010. They are well remembered for its achievement in 2009–10 season, when still in Segunda División B, it made worldwide headlines after defeated neighbours giants Real Madrid in Copa del Rey. Since then, it was popularized the expression "Alcorconazo" meaning this team makes a surprise against a successful rival. In that season they were champions in Segunda División B Group 2, and they played play-offs to promote to Segunda División. They were eliminated by Granada CF for winners phase and they entered to next phases and eliminated Pontevedra CF and Ontinyent CF.

Alcorcón had a regular 2011–12, being placed in the quiet zone almost all season but winning several consecutive matches in the spring. In the 41st round, they made another "Alcorconazo" and drew 1–1 at Valladolid, which meant the opposition did not depend exclusively on itself in the last matchday for direct promotion.

Alcorcón had never been in La Liga. They were in the second division since last season, 2010–11.

Background at 2011–12 Segunda División:

Round	2	3	4	5	6	7	8	9	10	1	11	12	13	14	15	16	17	18	19	20	21	22	23	24	25	26	27	28	29	31	32	33	34	35	36	37	38	39	40	30	41	42
Home/Away	H	A	H	A	H	A	H	A	H	A	H	A	H	A	H	A	H	A	H	A	H	H	A	H	A	H	A	H	A	A	A	H	A	H	A	H	A	H	A	H	H	A
Result	L	W	D	W	W	L	D	L	W	L	W	D	L	L	W	W	D	L	D	D	D	W	D	W	W	W	L	W	L	W	W	W	W	W	D	W	L	W	L	W	D	W
Position	16	9	11	7	3	8	7	10	8	11	10	11	12	14	12	8	9	11	10	11	11	9	10	8	8	8	8	8	8	8	7	5	5	5	5	5	5	4	4	4	4	4

=== Hércules ===
Hércules qualified to this phase in the last matchday (3 June 2012) like Alcorcón and Córdoba, after a necessary win (2–1) at SD Huesca (UD Almería could qualify instead if Hércules didn't win), and sought to promote immediately after being relegated from La Liga.

The team's early season was a spectacular one, gathering 28 points out of 33 in the first eleven matches, and leading for ten rounds during the 2011 autumn. Since November, however, it started to combine wins and losses, remaining however in the play-off zone until the end of league.

Hércules' last participation in La Liga was in last season (2010–11), having spent 20 seasons in La Liga: period 1935–42 (no football between 1936–39 due to the Spanish Civil War), 1945–46, from 1954–56, 1966–67, from 1974–82, 1984–85, 1996–97 and 2010–11. Hércules was 22nd in the all-time La Liga table, 13 points over long-standing rival and neighbours Elche CF. They were in Segunda División only since this related season.

Background at 2011–12 Segunda División:

Round	2	3	4	5	6	7	8	9	10	1	11	12	13	14	15	16	17	18	19	20	21	22	23	24	25	26	27	28	29	31	32	33	34	35	36	37	38	39	40	30	41	42
Home/Away	H	A	H	H	A	H	A	H	A	A	H	A	H	A	H	A	H	A	H	A	H	H	A	H	A	A	H	A	H	H	A	H	A	H	A	H	A	H	A	A	H	A
Result	W	W	L	W	D	W	W	W	W	W	W	L	L	W	L	D	D	L	W	L	W	L	W	L	L	W	W	L	W	L	L	W	W	W	W	D	D	L	L	W	D	W
Position	4	4	7	2	4	2	1	1	1	1	1	1	1	1	1	1	1	3	3	5	3	5	5	6	6	5	5	6	4	5	6	4	4	4	4	4	4	5	5	5	6	5

=== Córdoba ===
Córdoba qualified to this stage in the last matchday (3 June 2012), as Hércules and Alcorcón, after a 0–0 away draw against Celta de Vigo which was heavily criticised by Real Valladolid.

At time, an historical second division outfit, the Andalusia side's last top level participation was 40 years ago – in which it managed to defeat FC Barcelona and draw against Real Madrid at El Arcángel – and it finished fifth in the main category in 1964–65. It had a short spell in the third level in the 2000s, returning in 2007 after defeating Pontevedra CF and SD Huesca.

Córdoba had a regular 2011–12 season, being in the play-off area for some matches, and fighting last mid with neighbouring Almería for the final sixth-place, eventually succeeding.

Córdoba's last participation in La Liga was in 1971–72. The club spent a further seven seasons in the main category, from 1962–69. It ranked 38th in the all-time La Liga table (being surpassed by Levante UD at the end of 2011–12's top division). They were in Segunda División since 2007–08.

Background at 2011–12 Segunda División:

Round	2	3	4	5	6	7	8	9	10	1	11	12	13	14	15	16	17	18	19	20	21	22	23	24	25	26	27	28	29	31	32	33	34	35	36	37	38	39	40	30	41	42
Home/Away	H	A	H	A	H	A	H	A	H	A	A	H	A	H	A	H	A	H	H	A	H	H	A	H	A	H	A	H	A	A	H	A	H	A	H	A	H	A	A	H	H	A
Result	D	L	W	W	W	W	D	D	L	W	L	D	W	W	L	W	D	D	W	L	D	W	L	W	L	W	W	W	D	L	W	L	D	L	W	D	W	W	L	W	W	D
Position	10	16	13	10	6	4	4	4	7	5	9	10	7	4	6	4	5	7	6	7	7	6	7	7	7	6	6	5	6	6	4	6	6	7	7	7	6	6	6	6	5	6

== Promotion play-offs ==
Semi-finals
5	Hércules	1	0	1
4	Alcorcón (a)	1	0	1
6	Córdoba	0	0	0
3	Valladolid	0	3	3

Final
4	Alcorcón	0	1	1
3	Valladolid	1	1	2

=== Semifinals ===
Team 1	Agg.	Team 2	1st leg	2nd leg
Hércules	1–1 (a)	Alcorcón	1–1	0–0
Córdoba	0–3	Valladolid	0–0	0–3

==== First leg ====
6 June 2012
20:00 CEST

Hércules	1 – 1	Alcorcón
Sardinero 57'	Report; Live TV: Gol T / C+ Liga	Ángel 1'

Rico Pérez, Alicante
Attendance: 12,000
Referee: Daniel Ocón Arráiz (La Rioja)

HÉRCULES:
GK	1	(Spain) Juan Carlos
DF	23	(Spain) Anaitz Arbilla
DF	5	(Spain) Samuel Llorca	(yellow card) 73'
DF	20	(Spain) Pepe Mora
DF	16	(Spain) Paco Peña
MF	6	(Spain) Alberto Escassi	(yellow card) 44'
MF	24	(Portugal) Tiago Gomes
MF	8	(Spain) Míchel
FW	21	(Spain) Adrián Sardinero		(substituted off) 62'
FW	12	(Brazil) Gilvan Gomes		(substituted off) 75'
FW	7	(Spain) Urko Vera		(substituted off) 46'
Substitutions:
GK	25	(Spain) Ismael Falcón
DF	4	(Spain) Sergio Díaz
MF	17	(Spain) Carlos Calvo		(substituted on) 62'
MF	19	(Spain) Diego Rivas
MF	22	(Spain) Felipe Sanchón		(substituted on) 75'
FW	10	(Spain) Tote
FW	9	(Spain) David Aganzo	(yellow card) 65'	(substituted on) 46'
Manager:
(Spain) Juan Carlos Mandiá			(red card) 57'

ALCORCÓN:
GK	1	(Spain) Manu Herrera	(yellow card) 55'
DF	24	(Spain) Nagore
DF	6	(France) Jean-Sylvain Babin
DF	16	(Spain) Agus
DF	23	(Spain) Ángel Sánchez
MF	10	(Spain) Sergio Mora
MF	8	(Spain) Rubén Sanz
MF	20	(Spain) Fernando Sales		(substituted off) 80'
MF	11	(Spain) Francisco Montañés
FW	22	(Spain) Borja Pérez		(substituted off) 76'
FW	14	(Spain) Quini		(substituted off) 60'
Substitutions:
GK	13	(Spain) Raúl Moreno
DF	21	(Spain) Manuel Rueda
DF	2	(Spain) Carlos Expósito
MF	4	(Spain) Abraham
FW	18	(Spain) David Miguélez		(substituted on) 76'
FW	9	(Spain) Oriol Riera	(yellow card) 89'	(substituted on) 60'
FW	19	(Spain) Saúl Berjón		(substituted on) 80'
Manager:
(Spain) Juan Antonio Anquela

Assistant referees:
Íñigo Retegui Lamolla (La Rioja)
Enrique Rodríguez Sánchez (Castile-La Mancha)
Fourth official:
Juan Manuel López Amaya (Andalucía)

6 June 2012
22:00 CEST

Córdoba	0 – 0	Valladolid
	Report; Live TV: Canal+ 1

Nuevo Arcángel, Córdoba
Attendance: 11,773
Referee: Eduardo Prieto Iglesias (Navarre)

CÓRDOBA:
GK	1	(Spain) Alberto García
DF	17	(Spain) José Fernández
DF	4	(Spain) Gaspar	(yellow card) 70'
DF	15	(Spain) Ximo Navarro	(yellow card) 70'
DF	16	(Argentina) Sebastián Dubarbier		(substituted off) 77'
MF	14	(Spain) López Garai
MF	10	(Spain) Borja García
MF	21	(Spain) Carlos Caballero	(yellow card) 10'	(substituted off) 67'
MF	19	(Spain) López Silva
FW	11	(Brazil) Charles		(substituted off) 82'
FW	7	(Spain) Pepe Díaz
Substitutions:
GK	13	(Bolivia) Carlos Arias
DF	3	(Spain) Juan Fuentes		(substituted on) 67'
DF	25	(Spain) Miguel Ángel Tena
MF	29	(Spain) Fede Vico		(substituted on) 77'
MF	20	(Spain) Alberto Aguilar
FW	24	(Spain) Airam López
FW	9	(Spain) Javier Patiño		(substituted on) 82'
Manager:
(Spain) Paco Jémez

VALLADOLID:
GK	1	(Spain) Jaime		(substituted off) 83'
DF	24	(Spain) Mikel Balenziaga
DF	6	(Spain) Jesús Rueda
DF	4	(Spain) Marc Valiente
DF	17	(Spain) Carlos Peña
MF	16	(Tunisia) Mehdi Nafti	(yellow card) 73'
MF	22	(Spain) Víctor Pérez	(yellow card) 37'
MF	7	(Spain) Nauzet Alemán
MF	10	(Spain) Óscar González	(yellow card) 23'	(substituted off) 90'
MF	21	(Spain) Sisi		(substituted off) 80'
FW	9	(Spain) Javi Guerra	(yellow card) 87'
Substitutions:
GK	13	(Venezuela) Dani Hernández		(substituted on) 83'
DF	5	(Spain) Juanito
DF	8	(Spain) Javier Baraja
MF	14	(Spain) Jorge Alonso
MF	3	(Spain) Marquitos
MF	11	(Spain) Jofre Mateu		(substituted on) 80'
FW	15	(Spain) Alberto Bueno		(substituted on) 90'
Manager:
(Serbia) Miroslav Đukić

Assistant referees:
Francisco Javier Garcia Sabuco (Navarre)
David Maldonado Urbina (Community of Madrid)
Fourth official:
David Jiménez Moreno (Castile-La Mancha)

==== Second leg ====
10 June 2012
20:00 CEST

Valladolid	3 – 0 (3 – 0 agg.)	Córdoba
Óscar 50'; Javi Guerra 64'; Jofre 86'	Report; Live TV: Canal+ 1

Nuevo José Zorrilla, Valladolid
Attendance: 18,064
Referee: Santiago Jaime Latre (Aragon)

VALLADOLID:
GK	13	(Venezuela) Dani Hernández
DF	24	(Spain) Mikel Balenziaga
DF	6	(Spain) Jesús Rueda	(yellow card) 25'
DF	4	(Spain) Marc Valiente
DF	17	(Spain) Carlos Peña
MF	16	(Tunisia) Mehdi Nafti
MF	22	(Spain) Víctor Pérez
MF	7	(Spain) Nauzet Alemán		(substituted off) 71'
MF	10	(Spain) Óscar González		(substituted off) 52'
MF	21	(Spain) Sisi	(yellow card) 65'
FW	9	(Spain) Javi Guerra		(substituted off) 74'
Substitutions:
GK	26	(Spain) Jon Villanueva
DF	5	(Spain) Juanito
DF	8	(Spain) Javier Baraja	(yellow card) 84'	(substituted on) 74'
MF	14	(Spain) Jorge Alonso
MF	3	(Spain) Marquitos
MF	11	(Spain) Jofre Mateu	(yellow card) 88'	(substituted on) 71'
FW	15	(Spain) Alberto Bueno		(substituted on) 52'
Manager:
(Serbia) Miroslav Đukić

CÓRDOBA:
GK	1	(Spain) Alberto García	(yellow card) 88'
DF	17	(Spain) José Fernández
DF	4	(Spain) Gaspar	(yellow card) 4'	(substituted off) 66'
DF	15	(Spain) Ximo Navarro
DF	16	(Argentina) Sebastián Dubarbier	(yellow card) 89'
MF	14	(Spain) López Garai	(yellow card) 88'
MF	10	(Spain) Borja García
MF	21	(Spain) Carlos Caballero		(substituted off) 72'
MF	19	(Spain) López Silva
FW	11	(Brazil) Charles
FW	7	(Spain) Pepe Díaz		(substituted off) 76'
Substitutions:
GK	13	(Bolivia) Carlos Arias
DF	3	(Spain) Juan Fuentes
DF	25	(Spain) Miguel Ángel Tena
MF	29	(Spain) Fede Vico		(substituted on) 72'
MF	20	(Spain) Alberto Aguilar
MF	28	(Spain) Javi Hervás		(substituted on) 76'
FW	9	(Spain) Javier Patiño		(substituted on) 66'
Manager:
(Spain) Paco Jémez

Assistant referees:
Ramón García Salas (Catalonia)
Jorge Bueno Mateo (Aragon)
Fourth official:
Luis Miguel Vallejo Aznar (Aragon)

10 June 2012
22:00 CEST

Alcorcón	0 – 0 (1a – 1 agg.)	Hércules
	Report; Live TV: Gol T / C+ Liga

Santo Domingo, Alcorcón (Madrid)
Attendance: 4,700
Referee: Jesús Gil Manzano (Extremadura)

ALCORCÓN:
GK	1	(Spain) Manu Herrera	(yellow card) 56'
DF	24	(Spain) Nagore
DF	6	(France) Jean-Sylvain Babin		(substituted off) 52'
DF	16	(Spain) Agus
DF	23	(Spain) Ángel Sánchez	(yellow card) 84'
MF	10	(Spain) Sergio Mora	(yellow card) 89'
MF	8	(Spain) Rubén Sanz
MF	20	(Spain) Fernando Sales		(substituted off) 70'
MF	11	(Spain) Francisco Montañés
FW	22	(Spain) Borja Pérez
FW	14	(Spain) Quini		(substituted off) 61'
Substitutions:
GK	13	(Spain) Raúl Moreno
DF	21	(Spain) Manuel Rueda		(substituted on) 52'
DF	2	(Spain) Carlos Expósito
MF	4	(Spain) Abraham
FW	18	(Spain) David Miguélez
FW	9	(Spain) Oriol Riera		(substituted on) 61'
FW	19	(Spain) Saúl Berjón	(yellow card) 83'	(substituted on) 70'
Manager:
(Spain) Juan Antonio Anquela

HÉRCULES:
GK	1	(Spain) Juan Carlos
DF	23	(Spain) Anaitz Arbilla	(yellow card) 89'
DF	5	(Spain) Samuel Llorca
DF	20	(Spain) Pepe Mora		(substituted off) 76'
DF	16	(Spain) Paco Peña	(yellow card) 34'
MF	14	(Spain) Abel Aguilar	(yellow card) 89'
MF	24	(Portugal) Tiago Gomes		(substituted off) 64'
MF	8	(Spain) Míchel
FW	21	(Spain) Adrián Sardinero		(substituted off) 64'
FW	12	(Brazil) Gilvan Gomes	(yellow card) 44'
FW	9	(Spain) David Aganzo	(yellow card) 67' (yellow-red card) 89'
Substitutions:
GK	25	(Spain) Ismael Falcón
DF	4	(Spain) Sergio Díaz
MF	17	(Spain) Carlos Calvo		(substituted on) 64'
MF	22	(Spain) Felipe Sanchón
MF	6	(Spain) Alberto Escassi
FW	10	(Spain) Tote		(substituted on) 64'
FW	7	(Spain) Urko Vera		(substituted on) 76'
Manager:
(Spain) Juan Carlos Mandiá (banned)

Assistant referees:
Rafael Orellana Benítez (Catalonia)
Ángel Nevado Rodríguez (Extremadura)
Fourth official:
Andrés Manuel Ceballos Silva (Extremadura)

=== Final ===
Team 1	Agg.	Team 2	1st leg	2nd leg
Alcorcón	1–2	Valladolid	0–1	1–1

==== First leg ====
13 June 2012
21:00 CEST

Alcorcón	0 – 1	Valladolid
	Report; Live TV: Canal+ 1 Gol T / C+ Liga	Javi Guerra 29'

Santo Domingo, Alcorcón (Madrid)
Attendance: 4,700
Referee: Juan Martínez Munuera (Valencian Community)

ALCORCÓN:
GK	1	(Spain) Manu Herrera
DF	24	(Spain) Nagore	(yellow card) 2'	(substituted off) 59'
DF	21	(Spain) Manuel Rueda	(yellow card) 66'
DF	16	(Spain) Agus
DF	3	(Spain) Diego Bermúdez	(yellow card) 62'
MF	10	(Spain) Sergio Mora
MF	8	(Spain) Rubén Sanz
MF	20	(Spain) Fernando Sales
MF	11	(Spain) Francisco Montañés
FW	22	(Spain) Borja Pérez		(substituted off) 57'
FW	14	(Spain) Quini		(substituted off) 59'
Substitutions:
GK	13	(Spain) Raúl Moreno
DF	2	(Spain) Carlos Expósito
DF	5	(Spain) Javi Hernández
MF	4	(Spain) Abraham
FW	18	(Spain) David Miguélez		(substituted on) 57'
FW	9	(Spain) Oriol Riera		(substituted on) 59'
FW	19	(Spain) Saúl Berjón		(substituted on) 59'
Manager:
(Spain) Juan Antonio Anquela

VALLADOLID:
GK	13	(Venezuela) Dani Hernández
DF	24	(Spain) Mikel Balenziaga	(yellow card) 85'
DF	6	(Spain) Jesús Rueda
DF	4	(Spain) Marc Valiente
DF	17	(Spain) Carlos Peña	(yellow card) 52'
MF	16	(Tunisia) Mehdi Nafti
MF	22	(Spain) Víctor Pérez
MF	7	(Spain) Nauzet Alemán		(substituted off) 75'
MF	10	(Spain) Óscar González		(substituted off) 65'
MF	21	(Spain) Sisi
FW	9	(Spain) Javi Guerra		(substituted off) 88'
Substitutions:
GK	1	(Spain) Jaime
DF	5	(Spain) Juanito
DF	8	(Spain) Javier Baraja	(yellow card) 89'	(substituted on) 65'
MF	3	(Spain) Marquitos
MF	11	(Spain) Jofre Mateu		(substituted on) 75'
FW	15	(Spain) Alberto Bueno
FW	25	(Angola) Manucho		(substituted on) 88'
Manager:
(Serbia) Miroslav Đukić

Assistant referees:
David Canales Cerdà (Valencian Community)
Sergio Chinchilla Ortega (Valencian Community)
Fourth official:
Carlos Alberto Carbonell Hernández (Valencian Community)

==== Second leg ====
16 June 2012
21:00 CEST

Valladolid	1 – 1 (2 – 1 agg.)	Alcorcón
Javi Guerra 52'	Report; Live TV: Canal+ 1 Gol T / C+ Liga	Sales 44'

Nuevo José Zorrilla, Valladolid
Attendance: 26,500
Referee: Alejandro José Hernández Hernández (Las Palmas)

VALLADOLID:
GK	13	(Venezuela) Dani Hernández
DF	24	(Spain) Mikel Balenziaga
DF	6	(Spain) Jesús Rueda
DF	4	(Spain) Marc Valiente
DF	17	(Spain) Carlos Peña
MF	16	(Tunisia) Mehdi Nafti		(substituted off) 59'
MF	22	(Spain) Víctor Pérez
MF	7	(Spain) Nauzet Alemán
MF	10	(Spain) Óscar González
MF	21	(Spain) Sisi		(substituted off) 87'
FW	9	(Spain) Javi Guerra	(yellow card) 64'
Substitutions:
GK	26	(Spain) Jon Villanueva
DF	5	(Spain) Juanito
DF	8	(Spain) Javier Baraja	(yellow card) 89'	(substituted on) 85'
MF	18	(Spain) Álvaro Rubio		(substituted on) 59' (substituted off) 85'
MF	11	(Spain) Jofre Mateu		(substituted on) 87'
FW	15	(Spain) Alberto Bueno
FW	25	(Angola) Manucho
Manager:
(Serbia) Miroslav Đukić

ALCORCÓN:
GK	1	(Spain) Manu Herrera
DF	24	(Spain) Nagore
DF	21	(Spain) Manuel Rueda	(yellow card) 16'
DF	16	(Spain) Agus	(yellow card) 34'
DF	23	(Spain) Ángel Sánchez		(substituted off) 79'
MF	10	(Spain) Sergio Mora		(substituted off) 72'
MF	4	(Spain) Abraham
MF	8	(Spain) Rubén Sanz
MF	20	(Spain) Fernando Sales		(substituted off) 67'
MF	11	(Spain) Francisco Montañés
FW	9	(Spain) Oriol Riera	(yellow card) 34'
Substitutions:
GK	13	(Spain) Raúl Moreno
DF	2	(Spain) Carlos Expósito
DF	5	(Spain) Javi Hernández
FW	18	(Spain) David Miguélez		(substituted on) 79'
FW	19	(Spain) Saúl Berjón		(substituted on) 67'
FW	22	(Spain) Borja Pérez
FW	14	(Spain) Quini		(substituted on) 72'
Manager:
(Spain) Juan Antonio Anquela

Assistant referees:
Manuel Aboy Rivas (Las Palmas) (substituted off) 3'
José Enrique Naranjo Pérez (Las Palmas)
Fourth official:
Pablo González Fuertes (Asturias) (substituted on) 3'

Promoted to La Liga
Valladolid
(2 years later)

== See also ==
- 2011–12 Segunda División
- 2012–13 La Liga
- 2012–13 Segunda División
