= Javi Guerra (footballer, born 1982) =

Spanish footballer

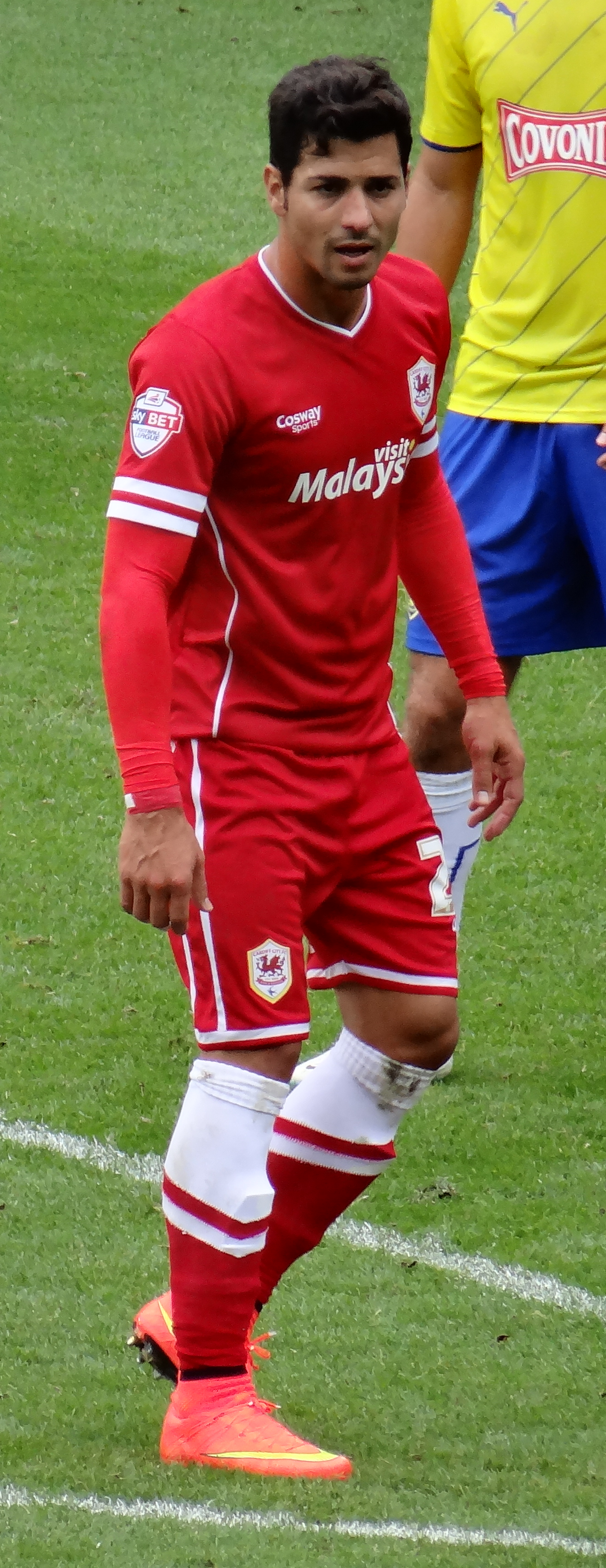
- Guerra playing for Cardiff City in 2014

Personal information
- Full name: Javier Guerra Rodríguez
- Date of birth: 15 March 1982 (age 44)
- Place of birth: Vélez-Málaga, Spain
- Height: 1.78 m (5 ft 10 in)
- Position: Striker

Youth career
- Espanyol

Senior career*
Years	Team	Apps	(Gls)
2001–2002	Vilassar Mar		
2002–2003	Motril	27	(7)
2003–2004	Cádiz	2	(0)
2004	Varzim	5	(0)
2004–2007	Valencia B	105	(55)
2007	Valencia	2	(0)
2007–2008	Granada 74	39	(8)
2008–2010	Mallorca	0	(0)
2008–2009	→ Alavés (loan)	40	(9)
2009–2010	→ Levante (loan)	37	(12)
2010–2014	Valladolid	144	(68)
2014–2015	Cardiff City	3	(0)
2015	→ Málaga (loan)	13	(5)
2015–2019	Rayo Vallecano	90	(24)
Total		507	(188)
- * Club domestic league appearances and goals

Javier "Javi" Guerra Rodríguez (Spanish pronunciation: [xaˈβjeɾ ˈxaβi ˈɣera roˈðɾiɣeθ]; (Note: In isolation, Guerra is pronounced [ˈɡera].) born 15 March 1982) is a Spanish former professional footballer who played as a striker.

He amassed Segunda División totals of 247 games and 86 goals over eight seasons, representing in the competition Cádiz, Granada 74, Alavés, Levante, Valladolid and Rayo Vallecano. He added 120 matches and 40 goals in La Liga, with Valencia, Valladolid, Málaga and Rayo.

== Club career ==
=== Early years and Valencia ===
Guerra was born in Vélez-Málaga, Andalusia. After beginning professionally with lowly Motril CF in the Segunda División B, he appeared sporadically for neighbouring Cádiz CF in the following season, after which he moved to La Liga with Valencia CF.

Guerra's stay with the Che would be quite unassuming, as he only managed to appear twice in the league in three years, totalling slightly more than ten minutes in a 3–0 loss at Getafe CF and a 3–2 home win against RCD Espanyol.

Released in June 2007, Guerra resumed his career in the Segunda División, with consecutive relegations with Granada 74 CF and Deportivo Alavés (the latter already owned by RCD Mallorca, which also loaned the player for the 2009–10 campaign, to Levante UD).

=== Valladolid ===
In August 2010, after greatly helping the Valencian Community team return to the top division, scoring 12 league goals which was second-best in the squad and joint-11th in the competition, Guerra left Mallorca permanently, signing a four-year contract with another side in the second tier, Real Valladolid, for free – the Balearic Islands club would only have to be paid if his new team promoted or decided to sell again. He had a breakthrough season in his first year, bettering his previous best by 12 goals and finishing second in the top scorers' list: highlights included braces against Recreativo de Huelva (2–0, at home), SD Huesca (2–0, home), SD Ponferradina (2–1, home), UD Salamanca (5–0, away), FC Barcelona B (2–1 home) and AD Alcorcón (2–0, home), and a hat-trick against CD Numancia (4–5 defeat, home).

Guerra continued with his fine form in the promotion playoffs, scoring the game's only goal in the first leg with Elche CF at the Estadio Nuevo José Zorrilla, in an eventual 3–2 aggregate loss. He netted significantly less in 2011–12, but two of his 17 goals included one in each leg of the promotion playoffs against Alcorcón, with Valladolid winning 2–1 on aggregate and returning to the top flight after two years.

On 16 December 2013, Guerra took his season tally to ten after scoring all of his team's goals in a 3–0 home defeat of RC Celta de Vigo. On 5 February of the following year, he signed a pre-contract agreement with Premier League club Cardiff City, with the deal being made effective in the summer after his link expired.

=== Cardiff City ===
Guerra was officially presented as a new Cardiff City player on 21 May 2014, signing a three-year contract. He made his debut for the club on 16 August, coming on as a substitute for Kenwyne Jones for the last 22 minutes of a 3–1 victory over Huddersfield Town at Cardiff City Stadium.

Having made only three bench appearances during the season, Guerra was loaned to Málaga CF on 15 January 2015, until June.

=== Rayo Vallecano ===
On 31 August 2015, Guerra joined Rayo Vallecano on a two-year deal. With 12 goals, he was the team's top scorer in his first season as they suffered relegation; this included two in the first ten minutes of a 2–1 home victory against Granada CF on 7 November.

Guerra extended his contract on 11 July 2016 to remain in Vallecas until 2019. His input was more limited as they won the 2017–18 Segunda División and were instantly demoted back, and on 30 June 2019 his link expired.

== Personal life ==
Guerra's twin brother, Emilio, was also a footballer and a forward. He spent the vast majority of his career in the Spanish lower leagues.

== Career statistics ==
Appearances and goals by club, season and competition
Club	Season	League			National Cup		League Cup		Other		Total	
Club	Season	Division	Apps	Goals	Apps	Goals	Apps	Goals	Apps	Goals	Apps	Goals
Motril	2002–03	Segunda División B	27	7	0	0	0	0	0	0	27	7
Cádiz	2003–04	Segunda División B	2	0	0	0	0	0	0	0	2	0
Varzim	2004–05	Segunda Liga	5	0	0	0	0	0	0	0	5	0
Valencia B	2004–05	Tercera División	34	19	0	0	0	0	0	0	34	19
Valencia B	2005–06	Tercera División	37	21	0	0	0	0	0	0	37	21
Valencia B	2006–07	Segunda División B	34	15	0	0	0	0	0	0	34	15
Valencia B	Total		105	55	0	0	0	0	0	0	105	55
Valencia	2006–07	La Liga	2	0	0	0	0	0	0	0	2	0
Granada 74	2007–08	Segunda División	39	8	2	0	0	0	0	0	41	8
Mallorca	2008–09	La Liga	0	0	0	0	0	0	0	0	0	0
Mallorca	2009–10	La Liga	0	0	0	0	0	0	0	0	0	0
Mallorca	Total		0	0	0	0	0	0	0	0	0	0
Alavés (loan)	2008–09	Segunda División	40	9	0	0	0	0	0	0	40	9
Levante (loan)	2009–10	Segunda División	37	12	1	0	0	0	0	0	38	12
Valladolid	2010–11	Segunda División	41	28	1	0	0	0	2	1	44	29
Valladolid	2011–12	Segunda División	36	17	0	0	0	0	4	3	40	20
Valladolid	2012–13	La Liga	30	8	2	0	0	0	0	0	32	8
Valladolid	2013–14	La Liga	37	15	2	1	0	0	0	0	39	16
Valladolid	Total		144	68	5	1	0	0	6	4	155	73
Cardiff City	2014–15	Championship	3	0	0	0	2	0	0	0	5	0
Málaga (loan)	2014–15	La Liga	13	5	1	0	0	0	0	0	14	5
Rayo Vallecano	2015–16	La Liga	30	12	1	0	0	0	0	0	31	12
Rayo Vallecano	2016–17	Segunda División	34	9	1	0	0	0	0	0	35	9
Rayo Vallecano	2017–18	Segunda División	18	3	1	0	0	0	0	0	19	3
Rayo Vallecano	2018–19	La Liga	8	0	0	0	0	0	0	0	8	0
Rayo Vallecano	Total		90	24	3	0	0	0	0	0	93	24
Career total			507	188	12	1	2	0	6	4	527	193

== Honours ==
Rayo Vallecano

- Segunda División: 2017–18
