= Carlos Expósito =

Spanish footballer

Personal information
- Full name: Carlos Expósito Verdejo
- Date of birth: 11 July 1991 (age 35)
- Place of birth: Madrid, Spain
- Height: 1.82 m (6 ft 0 in)
- Position: Right-back

Youth career
- 2001–2010: Real Madrid

Senior career*
Years	Team	Apps	(Gls)
2010–2011	Real Madrid C	32	(1)
2011–2013	Alcorcón	21	(0)
2013–2014	Levante B	33	(2)
2014–2015	Recreativo	0	(0)
2014–2015	→ Cacereño (loan)	7	(0)
2015	→ Marbella (loan)	18	(0)
2015–2018	Toledo	103	(3)
2018–2019	Atlético Baleares	11	(0)
2019	Linense	6	(0)
2019–2020	Talavera	27	(0)
2020–2022	Internacional Madrid	38	(0)
Total		296	(6)
- * Club domestic league appearances and goals

Carlos Expósito Verdejo (born 11 July 1991 in Madrid) is a Spanish former professional footballer who played as a right-back.
