= Pablo Barros =

Brazilian footballer

Personal information
- Full name: Pablo de Barros Paulino
- Date of birth: 3 August 1989 (age 37)
- Place of birth: São João Nepomuceno, Brazil
- Height: 1.77 m (5 ft 10 in)
- Position: Full back

Senior career*
Years	Team	Apps	(Gls)
2006–2007	Olaria	0	(0)
2007–2008	→ Vasco da Gama (loan)	15	(1)
2008–2011	Zaragoza	0	(0)
2008–2009	→ Málaga (loan)	14	(0)
2010	→ Gimnàstic (loan)	14	(0)
2010–2011	→ Cruzeiro (loan)	25	(0)
2011–2012	→ Figueirense (loan)	31	(2)
2013	Bahia	6	(1)
2014–2019	Tombense	9	(0)
2014	→ América Mineiro (loan)	39	(1)
2015	→ Avaí (loan)	44	(1)
2016	→ América Mineiro (loan)	36	(1)
2017–2018	→ Fortaleza (loan)	62	(2)
2019	→ São Bento (loan)	18	(0)
2020	Operário Ferroviário	4	(0)
- * Club domestic league appearances and goals as of 21:36, 22 May 2019 (UTC)

Pablo de Barros Paulino (born 3 August 1989), sometimes known as just Pablo, is a Brazilian footballer who plays as a full back.

== Career ==
He is known for his capacity to play in many different positions on the field. He has already played as a left wing back, right back, right wing back and as defensive midfielder, his original position. That capacity earned the trust of Antônio Lopes, coach of Vasco da Gama.
