= Alejandro Rebollo =

Spanish footballer

Personal information
- Full name: Alejandro Rebollo Ceñal
- Date of birth: 11 January 1983 (age 43)
- Place of birth: Gijón, Spain
- Height: 1.84 m (6 ft 1/2 in)
- Position: Goalkeeper

Youth career
- 1997–2001: Sporting Gijón
- 2001–2002: Oviedo

Senior career*
Years	Team	Apps	(Gls)
2002–2003	Oviedo B		
2003–2005	S.S. Reyes	42	(0)
2005–2006	Getafe B	9	(0)
2006–2007	Granada	4	(0)
2008	Lorca Deportiva	0	(0)
2008–2010	Palencia	76	(1)
2010–2011	Cartagena	7	(0)
2012–2013	Avilés	25	(0)
Total		163	(1)
- * Club domestic league appearances and goals

Alejandro Rebollo Ceñal (born 11 January 1983 in Gijón, Asturias) is a Spanish former footballer who played as a goalkeeper.
