= Quini (footballer, born 1980) =

Spanish footballer

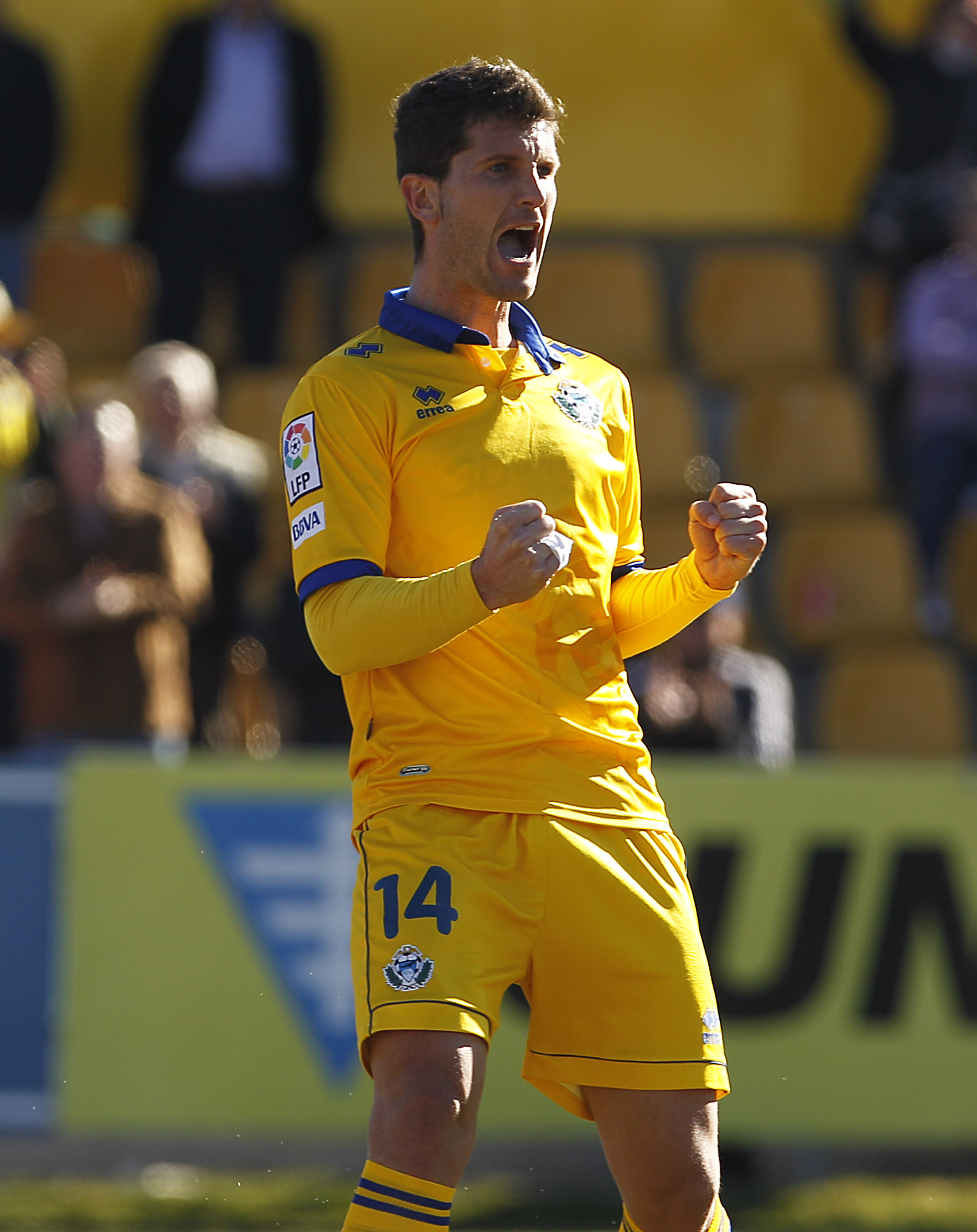
- Quini celebrates a goal for Alcorcón in 2012

Personal information
- Full name: Joaquín Álvarez Álvarez
- Date of birth: 4 July 1980 (age 46)
- Place of birth: Madrid, Spain
- Height: 1.82 m (6 ft 0 in)
- Position: Striker

Youth career
- 1996–1997: San Martín de la Vega

Senior career*
Years	Team	Apps	(Gls)
1997–1998	Atlético Pinto B		
1998–1999	Atlético Pinto		
1999–2000	Valdemoro		
2000–2001	Leganés B		
2001–2002	Puerta Bonita		
2002–2003	Atlético Pinto		
2003–2004	Alcalá	32	(5)
2004–2005	Alcorcón	37	(16)
2005–2007	Zamora	64	(18)
2007	Mazarrón		
2007–2010	Leganés	102	(39)
2010–2014	Alcorcón	99	(35)
2013	→ Racing Santander (loan)	21	(3)
2014–2015	Eldense	14	(2)
- * Club domestic league appearances and goals

Joaquín Álvarez Álvarez (born 4 July 1980), known as Quini, is a Spanish former footballer who played as a striker.

He began his professional career at age 30, and appeared in 120 Segunda División matches over four seasons, scoring a total of 38 goals for Alcorcón and Racing de Santander.

== Club career ==
From 1997 to 2010, Madrid-born Quini competed exclusively in the lower leagues of Spanish football, representing nine clubs including CA Pinto (two spells). In the 2009–10 season he scored 20 goals in 35 matches for CD Leganés, also in the Community of Madrid.

At the age of already 30, Quini made his Segunda División debut, with AD Alcorcón with whom he had already played six years before. He finished the 2010–11 campaign with 22 goals, fifth-best in the competition as the team easily retained their newly acquired status; highlights included a hat-trick against Girona FC (3–1 home win) and braces against SD Ponferradina (2–0, home), Xerez CD (3–1, home), Córdoba CF (2–1 at home), UD Las Palmas (5–0, home) and CD Tenerife (3–2 home victory).

Quini lowered his totals to 13 in 2011–12, but the side again stayed in the second tier, finishing in fourth position and qualifying for the playoffs. He was loaned to Racing de Santander in January 2013, eventually suffering relegation.

Quini left Alcorcón in the summer of 2014, and moved to CD Eldense in the Segunda División B. He retired in January 2015, immediately becoming the latter club's director of football.
