= Rubén Sanz =

Spanish footballer

Personal information
- Full name: Rubén Sanz Alonso
- Date of birth: 30 April 1980 (age 46)
- Place of birth: Valladolid, Spain
- Height: 1.83 m (6 ft 0 in)
- Position: Midfielder

Youth career
- 1996–1999: Valladolid

Senior career*
Years	Team	Apps	(Gls)
1999–2002	Valladolid B		
2002–2003	Langreo	31	(1)
2003–2016	Alcorcón	394	(20)
2016–2018	Fuenlabrada	35	(1)
Total		460+	(22+)
- * Club domestic league appearances and goals

Rubén Sanz Alonso (born 30 April 1980) is a Spanish former footballer who played as a midfielder.

He spent 13 years of his career with Alcorcón, his professional input with the club consisting of 149 Segunda División matches over six seasons (four goals).

== Club career ==
Born in Valladolid, Castile and León, Sanz started playing football with Real Valladolid Promesas. Following a brief spell with UP Langreo, he signed with AD Alcorcón also from Segunda División B, where he remained until his retirement more than one decade later.

Sanz appeared in only 19 games in his first season in the Segunda División, 2010–11 (out of 42), but became an undisputed starter as in his previous years from there onwards. He was also in Alcorcón's starting XI in the club's 4–0 home thrashing of Real Madrid in the 2009–10 edition of the Copa del Rey (4–1 aggregate win).

On 24 June 2016, after 432 competitive appearances, Sanz left the Alfareros and joined neighbours CF Fuenlabrada as a free agent.
