= Airam Cabrera =

Spanish footballer (born 1987)

Airam
Personal information
- Full name: Airam López Cabrera
- Date of birth: 21 October 1987 (age 39)
- Place of birth: Puerto de la Cruz, Spain
- Height: 1.80 m (5 ft 11 in)
- Position: Striker

Youth career
- Tenerife

Senior career*
Years	Team	Apps	(Gls)
2007–2010	Tenerife B	74	(51)
2007–2008	→ Laguna (loan)	38	(17)
2010–2012	Villarreal B	48	(9)
2012	Córdoba	16	(3)
2012–2013	Numancia	12	(0)
2013	Lugo	18	(3)
2013–2015	Cádiz	65	(35)
2015–2016	Korona Kielce	28	(16)
2016–2017	Anorthosis	32	(6)
2017–2020	Extremadura	39	(7)
2018–2019	→ Cracovia (loan)	27	(14)
2020–2021	Wisła Płock	5	(0)
2021–2022	Goa	13	(6)
2022–2024	Sanluqueño	52	(10)
2024–2025	San Fernando	10	(1)
Total		477	(178)
- * Club domestic league appearances and goals

Airam López Cabrera (born 21 October 1987), known simply as Airam, is a Spanish former professional footballer who played as a striker.

After being top scorer in the lower divisions for Tenerife B, he represented five teams in the Segunda División, totalling 16 goals in 106 games. He also played in Poland, Cyprus and India, appearing in the former country's Ekstraklasa for Korona Kielce, Cracovia and Wisła Płock.

== Club career ==
=== Tenerife ===
Born in Puerto de la Cruz, Canary Islands, Airam was formed at local CD Tenerife, and made his debut on loan at CD Laguna de Tenerife before playing for his parent club's reserves. In 2008–09, he was Tercera División's top scorer (Canarian group) with 23 goals, bettering that total by four to be crowned the overall Pichichi of Segunda División B the following season, although his team was relegated.

The latter season's tally included four in a 5–1 home win against RSD Alcalá on 20 September 2009, and a hat-trick of penalty kicks the following 10 January in a 4–1 rout of neighbours UD Vecindario.

=== Villarreal and Córdoba ===
On 22 April 2010, Airam signed a two-year deal at Villarreal CF, with an option of a third. He was assigned to the B side in the Segunda División, and made his professional debut on 27 August when he started in a 3–0 loss at Real Valladolid. Eight days later he scored his first goal for the team, the sole one in their home win over Albacete Balompié. On 25 September, after coming on as an 83rd-minute substitute for Natxo Insa, he netted twice in a 3–2 away victory over Girona FC.

On 31 January 2012, Airam terminated his Villarreal contract with minutes remaining of the transfer window, and joined Córdoba CF in the same league for the remainder of the season. In his brief spell in Andalusia, he scored a brace in a 3–1 home win against SD Huesca on 10 March and helped the side to the promotion play-offs; he said at the end of his contract that he would have liked to remain at the Estadio Nuevo Arcángel.

=== Numancia and Lugo ===
Airam remained in the second division subsequently, signing a one-year deal at CD Numancia with the option of a second on 31 July 2012. He started only two league games for the team from Soria, without scoring, and left by mutual consent the following 10 January. Later that day, he joined CD Lugo still in the second level for the rest of the campaign.

On 30 March 2013, Airam scored his only goals for the Galicians, a hat-trick in a 4–0 home defeat of Xerez CD.

=== Cádiz ===
On 30 July 2013, Airam returned to division three for the first time in three years, agreeing to a three-year deal at Cádiz CF. His 23 goals in 32 games over his first season helped the club to the play-offs, and his 12 in 33 in the ensuing campaign helped them win their group.

=== Korona Kielce ===
On 2 June 2015, it was reported that Airam's first club Tenerife were interested in reacquiring his services. However, this scheme collapsed the following month, and as Cádiz also failed to gain promotion, he instead moved abroad for the first time by signing a one-year deal at Poland's Korona Kielce.

Airam made his top flight debut on 11 September 2015, starting in a goalless draw at Lechia Gdańsk, and scored his first Ekstraklasa goal on 16 October, a penalty to win the game against Śląsk Wrocław. He netted his first hat-trick in Poland on 20 February 2016, in a 4–2 victory over Gdańsk at the Stadion Miejski Kielce; despite the team finishing in the bottom half of the table, his tally of 16 goals was bettered only by Nemanja Nikolić of champions Legia Warsaw.

=== Anorthosis ===
Airam switched countries again on 10 August 2016, signing for Anorthosis Famagusta FC of the Cypriot First Division and teaming up with several compatriots including manager Antonio Puche. He made his debut on 11 September, replacing Esmaël Gonçalves after 59 minutes of the away fixture against Aris Limassol FC and scoring the 2–1 winner.

=== Extremadura ===
Airam returned to Spain's third tier on 8 July 2017, when he signed for Extremadura UD. In his first season, the team won an unprecedented promotion to the second division.

In August 2018, Airam went back to Poland's top flight when he was loaned to KS Cracovia.

=== Later career ===
Airam joined Wisła Płock of the same country and league on 17 October 2020. On 13 August 2021, he moved to Indian Super League club FC Goa on a one-year contract. He scored half of his goals for the latter the following 6 March, a hat-trick in the 4–4 home draw with Kerala Blasters FC.

In summer 2022, aged 34, Airam returned to his homeland by joining Atlético Sanluqueño CF of Segunda Federación on a one-year deal, with a one-year option. He totalled ten goals in his debut campaign to achieve promotion.

On 17 July 2024, Airam signed with fourth-tier club San Fernando CD. He left the following January, retiring shortly after.
