= Alberto Aguilar (Spanish footballer) =

Spanish footballer

Alberto
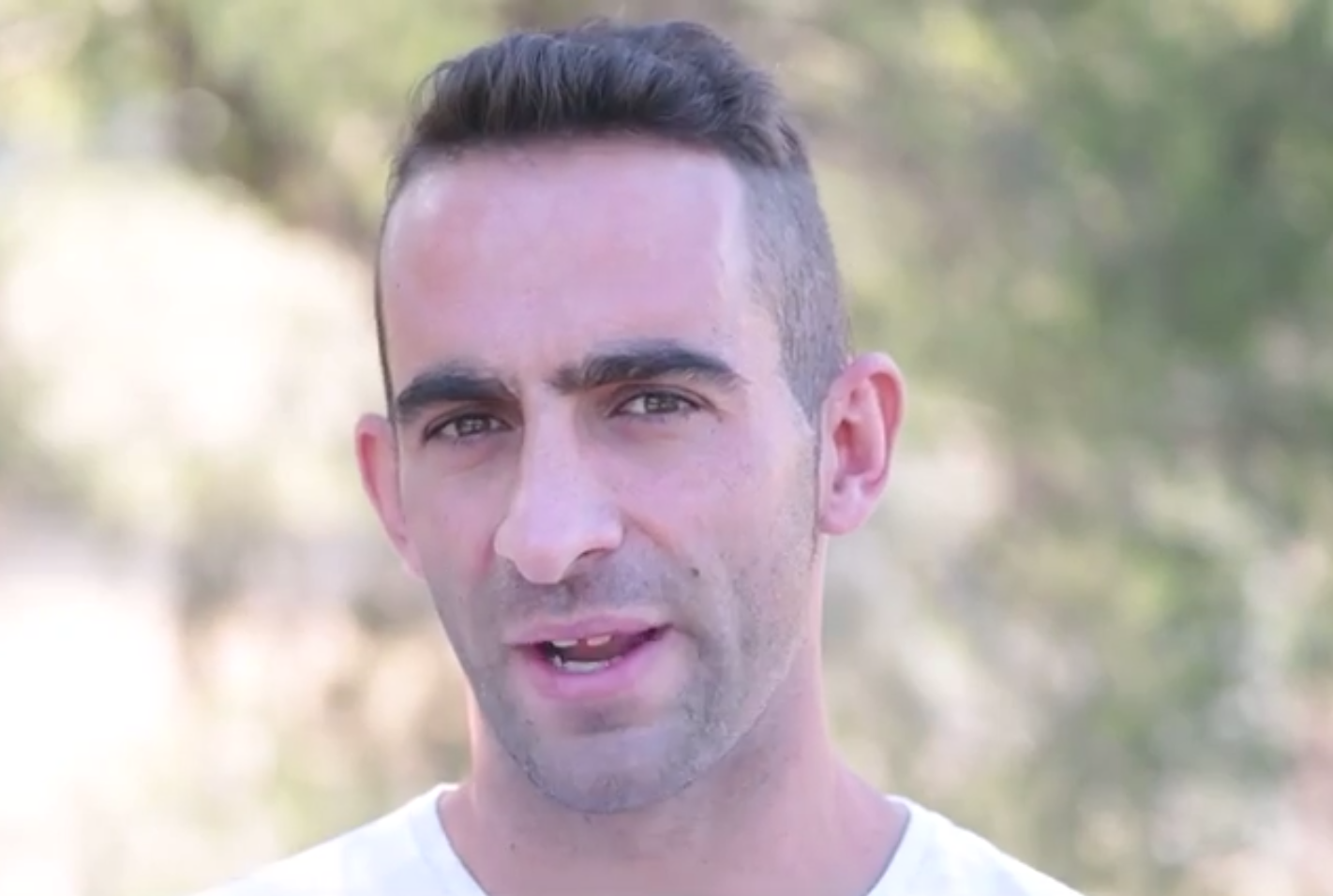

Personal information
- Full name: Alberto Aguilar Leiva
- Date of birth: 12 July 1984 (age 42)
- Place of birth: Benamejí, Spain
- Height: 1.85 m (6 ft 1 in)
- Positions: Centre-back; defensive midfielder

Youth career
- Málaga

Senior career*
Years	Team	Apps	(Gls)
2003–2005	Málaga B	52	(4)
2003	Málaga	1	(0)
2005–2007	Getafe	32	(0)
2008	Granada 74	20	(1)
2008–2010	Albacete	69	(3)
2010–2013	Córdoba	83	(5)
2013–2015	Ponferradina	65	(5)
2015–2016	Western Sydney Wanderers	23	(1)
2016–2017	Anorthosis	14	(0)
2017–2018	Cartagena	16	(0)
2018–2021	Antequera	76	(8)
Total		451	(27)

Managerial career
- 2022: Antequera (caretaker)
- 2025: Antequera (caretaker)
- * Club domestic league appearances and goals

Alberto Aguilar Leiva (born 12 July 1984), known simply as Alberto, is a Spanish former professional footballer who played as a centre-back or defensive midfielder, and is currently the Sporting Director at Antequera CF.

He totalled 278 games and 18 goals in the Segunda División, with Málaga B, Granada 74, Albacete, Córdoba and Ponferradina. In La Liga he represented Málaga (one appearance) and Getafe (32), and also played professionally in Australia and Cyprus.

== Club career ==
Alberto was born in Benamejí, Córdoba. A product of Málaga CF's youth system, he made his professional debut for the first team in the last match of the 2002–03 season, a 1–0 La Liga away loss against RCD Mallorca, while also helping the reserves achieve a 2003 promotion to Segunda División.

For the 2005–06 campaign, Alberto signed with Madrid's Getafe CF, totalling 30 top-flight appearances in his first two years and also playing an important part in the team's runner-up run in the Copa del Rey. However, the arrival of coach Michael Laudrup deemed him surplus to requirements in his third, which prompted a release in January 2008 with a move to second division club Granada 74 CF.

Alberto stayed in that tier ahead of the following season, joining Albacete Balompié. In August 2010, as a free agent, he returned to his native Andalusia after agreeing to a deal at Córdoba CF.

From 2013 to 2015, Alberto continued competing in division two, with SD Ponferradina. On 9 August 2015, aged 31, he moved abroad for the first time, signing for Western Sydney Wanderers.

On 5 May 2016, after having helped his team reach the Grand Final, Alberto was released. In June, he joined Cypriot club Anorthosis Famagusta F.C. on a one-year deal.

== Managerial statistics ==
As of 29 November 2025

Managerial record by team and tenure
Team	Nat	From	To	Record								Ref
Team	Nat	From	To	G	W	D	L	GF	GA	GD	Win %	Ref
Antequera (caretaker)	(Spain)	31 March 2022	17 April 2022	3	2	1	0	6	3	+3	66.67	
Antequera (caretaker)	(Spain)	24 November 2025	30 November 2025	1	1	0	0	3	1	+2	100.00	
Total				4	3	1	0	9	4	+5	75.00	—

== Honours ==
Getafe

- Copa del Rey runner-up: 2006–07
