= David Miguélez =

Spanish footballer (born 1981)

Personal information
- Full name: David Miguélez Miguel
- Date of birth: 5 May 1981 (age 45)
- Place of birth: Gijón, Spain
- Height: 1.79 m (5 ft 10 in)
- Position: Striker

Youth career
- Sporting Gijón
- Veriña

Senior career*
Years	Team	Apps	(Gls)
1999–2002	Ribadesella		
2002–2003	Mensajero		
2003	Vecindario	4	(0)
2004–2006	Linense		
2006–2007	Lugo	33	(6)
2007–2009	Linense	69	(18)
2009–2011	Sant Andreu	73	(18)
2011–2013	Alcorcón	65	(7)
2013–2015	Racing Santander	67	(6)
2015–2016	Guadalajara	35	(4)
2016–2018	Llanera	20	(16)
2018–2019	Roces	1	(0)
- * Club domestic league appearances and goals

David Miguélez Miguel (born 5 May 1981) is a Spanish former footballer who played as a striker.
