= Javi Hernández (footballer, born 1983) =

Spanish footballer

Personal information
- Full name: Francisco Javier Hernández García
- Date of birth: 20 January 1983 (age 43)
- Place of birth: Almansa, Spain
- Height: 1.88 m (6 ft 2 in)
- Position: Centre back

Youth career
- Atlético Madrid

Senior career*
Years	Team	Apps	(Gls)
2001–2002	Atlético Aviación		
2002	Tenerife B		
2002–2003	Almansa		
2003–2005	Tomelloso	38	(0)
2005–2006	Benidorm	5	(0)
2006–2007	Almansa		
2007–2008	Celta B	33	(1)
2008–2009	Almansa	23	(1)
2009–2010	Conquense	27	(1)
2010–2012	Alcorcón	32	(2)
2012–2013	Alavés	32	(2)
2013–2014	Oviedo	17	(3)
2014–2015	UCAM Murcia	8	(0)
2015–2016	Marbella	16	(1)
2016–2017	Yeclano		
2017–2021	Almansa		
- * Club domestic league appearances and goals

Francisco Javier 'Javi' Hernández García (born 20 January 1983) is a Spanish former footballer who played as a central defender.
