= Ángel Sánchez (footballer, born 1982) =

Spanish footballer and manager

Personal information
- Full name: Ángel Sánchez Martín
- Date of birth: 15 January 1982 (age 44)
- Place of birth: Béjar, Spain
- Height: 1.80 m (5 ft 11 in)
- Position: Left-back

Youth career
- Real Madrid

Senior career*
Years	Team	Apps	(Gls)
2000–2001	Alavés C		
2001–2003	Alavés B	57	(3)
2003–2008	Alavés	89	(0)
2005–2006	→ Ciudad Murcia (loan)	16	(0)
2008–2010	Levante	38	(0)
2010–2015	Alcorcón	157	(4)
2015–2017	Guijuelo	41	(1)
Total		398	(8)

Managerial career
- 2017–2018: Guijuelo (assistant)
- 2018–2020: Guijuelo
- * Club domestic league appearances and goals

Ángel Sánchez Martín (born 15 January 1982) is a Spanish former professional footballer who played as a left-back. He later worked as a manager.

== Playing career ==
Born in Béjar, Province of Salamanca, Sánchez amassed Segunda División totals of 296 matches and four goals over 12 seasons, representing in the competition Deportivo Alavés, Ciudad de Murcia, Levante UD and AD Alcorcón. His best output occurred in 2010–11, when he scored twice in 36 appearances to help the latter team finish ninth in their first-ever experience at that level.

On 11 July 2015, the 33-year-old Sánchez returned to both his native region and Segunda División B, signing a two-year contract with CD Guijuelo.

== Coaching career ==
Sánchez retired in May 2017, and immediately joined his last club's staff. On 1 June 2018, he was named first-team manager in the place of Jordi Fabregat.

== Managerial statistics ==
As of 7 March 2020

Managerial record by team and tenure
Team	Nat	From	To	Record								Ref
Team	Nat	From	To	G	W	D	L	GF	GA	GD	Win %	Ref
Guijuelo	(Spain)	1 June 2018	4 June 2020	67	27	15	25	66	61	+5	40.30	
Career total				67	27	15	25	66	61	+5	40.30	—
