= Manuel Rueda =

Spanish footballer

Personal information
- Full name: Manuel Rueda García
- Date of birth: 2 January 1980 (age 46)
- Place of birth: San Fernando, Spain
- Height: 1.88 m (6 ft 2 in)
- Position: Centre back

Youth career
- Chiclana
- Cádiz

Senior career*
| Years | Team | Apps | (Gls) |
| 1998–1999 | Ferriolense | | |
| 1999–2001 | Mallorca B | 4 | (0) |
| 2001–2002 | Caravaca | | |
| 2002–2006 | Águilas | 62 | (7) |
| 2006–2008 | Lorca Deportiva | 42 | (1) |
| 2008–2010 | Sant Andreu | 51 | (8) |
| 2010–2012 | Alcorcón | 47 | (1) |
| 2012–2013 | Cartagena | 15 | (2) |
| Total | | 221 | (19) |
- * Club domestic league appearances and goals

Manuel Rueda García (born 2 January 1980 in San Fernando, Cádiz, Andalusia) is a Spanish retired footballer who played as a central defender.
