= Miguel Ángel Tena =

Spanish footballer

Personal information
- Full name: Miguel Ángel Tena García
- Date of birth: 17 January 1982 (age 44)
- Place of birth: Almassora, Spain
- Height: 1.85 m (6 ft 1 in)
- Position: Centre-back

Youth career
- 1993–1997: Castellón
- 1997–2001: Valencia

Senior career*
Years	Team	Apps	(Gls)
2001–2003	Valencia B	39	(0)
2003–2004	Villarreal B		
2004–2005	Villarreal	1	(0)
2004–2005	→ Racing Ferrol (loan)	39	(1)
2005–2008	Poli Ejido	89	(6)
2008–2009	Levante	19	(5)
2009–2010	Elche	22	(0)
2010–2013	Córdoba	59	(4)
2013–2014	Lugo	14	(1)
2014	Cádiz	16	(1)
2014–2015	Racing Ferrol	30	(0)
Total		328	(18)

Managerial career
- 2015–2016: Racing Ferrol
- 2016–2017: Racing Ferrol
- 2020–2021: Villarreal C
- 2023: Villarreal (caretaker)
- * Club domestic league appearances and goals

Miguel Ángel Tena García (born 17 January 1982) is a Spanish former professional footballer who played as a centre-back.

== Playing career ==
Born in Almassora, Province of Castellón, Tena joined up-and-coming Villarreal CF in 2003 from neighbouring Valencia CF, after finishing his football development with the latter and following a failed transfer to Real Madrid Castilla. He made his professional – and La Liga – debut in the 2003–04 season, but would only appear in one league match with his new club, being replaced at the hour-mark of a 2–1 away loss against CA Osasuna.

Subsequently, Tena resumed his career in the Segunda División, with Racing de Ferrol, Polideportivo Ejido (three years), Levante UD, Elche CF, Córdoba CF and CD Lugo, playing 242 games at that level over one decade.

== Coaching career ==
On 18 June 2015, Tena was appointed manager of Racing Ferrol. He left in May 2016 after being ousted by Cádiz CF in the promotion playoffs, but returned to his post in October, with the club still in the Segunda División B.

Tena acted as both third-team coach and director of football for Villarreal in the 2020–21 season. On 10 November 2023, he was named interim of their main squad following the sacking of Pacheta. Three days later, after losing his only match in charge, 3–1 at Atlético Madrid, he was replaced by Marcelino García Toral.

== Managerial statistics ==
As of 13 November 2023

Team	From	To	Record								Ref.
Team	From	To	G	W	D	L	GF	GA	GD	Win %	Ref.
Racing Ferrol	18 June 2015	29 May 2016	42	22	11	9	63	32	+31	52.38	
Racing Ferrol	17 October 2016	18 December 2017	49	16	13	20	57	56	+1	32.65	
Villarreal C	8 July 2020	26 February 2021	15	3	10	2	19	14	+5	20.00	
Villarreal (caretaker)	10 November 2023	13 November 2023	1	0	0	1	1	3	−2	0.00	
Total			107	41	34	32	140	105	+35	38.32	—
