= Raúl Moreno =

Spanish footballer

Personal information
- Full name: Raúl Moreno Artalejo
- Date of birth: 21 November 1979 (age 46)
- Place of birth: Madrid, Spain
- Height: 1.80 m (5 ft 11 in)
- Position: Goalkeeper

Youth career
- Fuenlabrada

Senior career*
Years	Team	Apps	(Gls)
1996–1999	Fuenlabrada B		
1999–2001	Fuenlabrada	72	(0)
2001–2004	Valencia B	16	(0)
2004–2005	Cultural Leonesa	10	(0)
2005–2010	Leganés	173	(0)
2010–2012	Alcorcón	2	(0)
2012–2013	Salamanca	25	(0)
2014	Ponferradina	0	(0)
2014–2015	La Hoya Lorca	37	(0)
2015–2016	Mérida	38	(0)
2016–2017	SS Reyes	24	(0)
Total		397	(0)
- * Club domestic league appearances and goals

Raúl Moreno Artalejo (born 21 November 1979) is a Spanish former footballer who played as a goalkeeper.

== Club career ==
Born in Madrid, Moreno spent the vast majority of his career in the Segunda División B after starting out at local club CF Fuenlabrada. After three years with Valencia CF's reserves, he signed with CD Leganés – also in his native region – in 2005, with whom he appeared in the 2009 promotion play-offs, being sent off in the match against Real Jaén.

Moreno's input at the professional level consisted of two Segunda División matches for AD Alcorcón, both in the 2010–11 season (he added four appearances in the Copa del Rey). He was part of SD Ponferradina's second-tier squad in the second part of the 2013–14 campaign, but did not receive any playing time.
