= Granada 74 CF =

Spanish association football club

Granada 74
- Full name: Granada 74 Club de Fútbol, S.A.D.
- Founded: 1999 as CF Ciudad de Murcia; 2007 as Granada 74 SAD
- Dissolved: 2010
- Ground: La Victoria; Pinos Puente, Andalusia, Spain
- Capacity: 4,400
Home colours	Away colours

Granada 74 Club de Fútbol, S.A.D., commonly known as Granada 74, was a Spanish football team based in Granada, in the autonomous community of Andalusia. It has not registered in any competition since 2009, it held home matches at Estadio La Victoria de Pinos Puente, with a capacity of 4,400 spectators.

== History ==
Granada 74 CF was created on 6 June 2007 when Carlos Marsá, an investor from Granada, bought Segunda División team Ciudad de Murcia. Ciudad's footballing rights and contracts were transferred to the newly founded side, which in practice meant Ciudad had been relocated to Granada even if the club was considered a new entity.

Ciudad players still under contract for the 2007–08 season had the option to stay with the new club or cancel their contract. Also, as part of the new setup, Tercera División's CP Granada 74 became the reserve team.

For the 2009–10 campaign, Granada 74 was not registered in any category.

== Seasons ==
Season	Tier	Division	Place	Copa del Rey
1999–2007	as Ciudad de Murcia			
2007–08	2	2ª	21st	Round of 32
2008–09	3	2ª B	18th	Third round

- 1 season in Segunda División
- 1 season in Segunda División B

== See also ==
- CP Granada 74 (reserve team)
- Relocation of professional sports teams
