= 2011–12 Gimnàstic de Tarragona season =

Gimnàstic de Tarragona
2011–12 season
- President: Josep María Andreu i Prats
- Manager: Jorge D'Alessandro
- Liga Adelante: 22nd (Relegated)
- Copa del Rey: Second Round
- Top goalscorer: League: Berry Powel (9); All: Berry Powel (9)
Home colours	Away colours	Third colours

Is the 2011–12 Gimnàstic de Tarragona season. The club plays in two tournaments: the Segunda División and the Copa del Rey.

== Squad ==
Note: Flags indicate national team as defined under FIFA eligibility rules; some limited exceptions apply. Players may hold more than one non-FIFA nationality.

No.	Pos.	Nation	Player
1	GK	ESP	Rubén Pérez (vice-captain)
3	DF	ESP	Mingo (captain)
4	MF	ESP	Rodri
5	DF	ESP	Álex Ortiz
6	MF	ESP	Fernando Seoane
7	MF	ESP	Álvaro Rey
8	MF	ESP	Fernando Morán
10	FW	ESP	Roberto Peragón
13	GK	ESP	David Valle
14	MF	ESP	Antonio Longás

No.	Pos.	Nation	Player
15	DF	ESP	Pedro Mairata
16	MF	ESP	Dani Abalo (on loan from Celta Vigo)
17	DF	ESP	Raúl Fuster
18	MF	ESP	Tuni
20	MF	BOL	Samuel Galindo (on loan from Arsenal)
21	DF	ESP	Xisco Campos
22	DF	ESP	Manuel Ruz
24	FW	ESP	Mikel Orbegozo (on loan from Athletic Bilbao)
26	DF	ESP	Sergio Juste

=== Youth squad ===
Youth players with first team experience
Note: Flags indicate national team as defined under FIFA eligibility rules; some limited exceptions apply. Players may hold more than one non-FIFA nationality.

No.	Pos.	Nation	Player
27	DF	ESP	Aitor Casas
28	MF	ESP	Jordi Roca
29	MF	ESP	Fran Carbià
30	DF	ESP	Aleix Coch
35	GK	ESP	Sergio
36	FW	ESP	Joel Coch
39	MF	ESP	Alfons Serra
40	GK	ESP	Antonio David

No.	Pos.	Nation	Player
41	MF	ESP	Bueno
44	FW	ESP	Juan Millán
45	MF	ESP	Eugeni
51	DF	ESP	Charly
52	MF	ESP	Joan
53	FW	ESP	Gestí
54	MF	ESP	Gabriel Vidal

=== Technical staff ===
Position	Staff
Head coach	Jorge D'Alessandro
Assistant coach	Jesús María Serrano
Trainer	Romà Cunillera
Goalkeeper coach	Adolfo Baines
Physician	Carles Hernàndez
Physiotherapist	Ernest Canete
Physiotherapist	Pedro Flores
Physiotherapist	Carles López
Physiotherapist	Jordi Carrasco

== Transfers ==
=== In ===
#	Pos	Player	From	Type
13	GK	(Spain) David Valle	(Spain) Badalona	Transfer
	DF	(Mexico) Rodrigo Íñigo	Free Agent	Trial
20	MF	(Bolivia) Samuel Galindo	(England) Arsenal	Loan
14	MF	(Spain) Antonio Longás	(Spain) Cartagena	Transfer
18	MF	(Spain) Tuni	(Spain) Mallorca	Transfer
19	MF	(Uruguay) Adrián Luna	(Spain) Espanyol	Loan
25	MF	(Spain) Arzu	(Spain) Betis	Transfer
	MF	(Brazil) Pedro	(Brazil) Grêmio Maringá	Trial
	FW	(Brazil) Thiago Augusto	(Brazil) Grêmio Maringá	Trial
10	FW	(Spain) Roberto Peragón	(Spain) Girona	Transfer
	FW	(Serbia) Milan Perić	(Serbia) Kaposvári Rákóczi	Trial
23	FW	(Spain) Borja Viguera	(Spain) Real Sociedad	Loan
12	FW	(Spain) Juan Domínguez	(Spain) Eibar	Loan Return
	MAN	(Argentina) Jorge D'Alessandro	Free Agent	Free
16	MF	(Spain) Dani Abalo	(Spain) Celta Vigo	Loan
24	FW	(Spain) Mikel Orbegozo	(Spain) Athletic Bilbao	Loan
11	FW	(France) Hugo Bargas	(Argentina) All Boys	Transfer

=== Out ===
#	Pos	Player	To	Type
13	GK	(Spain) José Moragón	(Spain) L'Hospitalet	Contract Terminated
5	DF	(Spain) Sergio Díaz	(Spain) Hércules	Contract Terminated
30	DF	(France) Marc Fachan	(Spain) Alavés	Contract Terminated
50	DF	(Spain) Fran Vélez	(Spain) Logroñés	Loan
2	MF	(Spain) Álex Bergantiños	(Spain) Deportivo La Coruña	Loan Return
10	MF	(Spain) Walter Fernández	(Hungary) Videoton	Transfer
14	MF	(Spain) Vicente	(Spain) Leganés	Contract Terminated
6	MF	(Spain) David Medina	(Spain) Tenerife	Contract Terminated
19	MF	(France) Ludovic Delporte	Free Agent	Contract Terminated
20	MF	(Spain) Miki	(Spain) Alcoyano	Contract Terminated
24	MF	(Spain) Gerardo	Free Agent	Contract Terminated
7	FW	(Spain) Albert Virgili	(Spain) Llagostera	Contract Terminated
9	FW	(Spain) Rubén Navarro	(Spain) Leganés	Contract Terminated
11	FW	(Spain) Felipe Sanchón	(Italy) Udinese	Loan Return
25	FW	(Spain) Borja Viguera	(Spain) Real Sociedad	Loan Return
	MAN	(Spain) Juan Carlos Oliva	Free Agent	Contract Terminated
11	FW	(Spain) Eloy Gila	(Spain) Betis B	Loan
12	FW	(Spain) Juan Domínguez	(Spain) Guijuelo	Contract Terminated
19	FW	(Uruguay) Adrián Luna	(Spain) Espanyol	Loan Return
23	FW	(Spain) Borja Viguera	(Spain) Real Sociedad	Loan Return
2	DF	(Spain) Julio Rico	(Spain) Espanyol B	Loan
9	FW	(Netherlands) Berry Powel	(Spain) Elche	Contract Terminated
11	FW	(France) Hugo Bargas	(Bolivia) Blooming	Contract Terminated
25	MF	(Spain) Arzu	Free Agent	Contract Terminated

== Player statistics ==
=== Squad statistics ===
Last updated on 4 June 2012.

No.	Pos	Nat	Player	Total		Liga Adelante		Copa del Rey	
No.	Pos	Nat	Player	Apps	Goals	Apps	Goals	Apps	Goals
1	GK	(Spain) ESP	Rubén Pérez	42	0	42	0	0	0
3	DF	(Spain) ESP	Mingo	31	0	30	0	1	0
4	MF	(Spain) ESP	Rodri	34	2	34	2	0	0
5	DF	(Spain) ESP	Álex Ortiz	17	3	17	3	0	0
6	MF	(Spain) ESP	Fernando Seoane	38	0	37	0	1	0
7	MF	(Spain) ESP	Álvaro Rey	25	1	25	1	0	0
8	MF	(Spain) ESP	Morán	33	8	33	8	0	0
10	FW	(Spain) ESP	Roberto Peragón	30	1	30	1	0	0
13	GK	(Spain) ESP	David Valle	1	0	0	0	1	0
14	MF	(Spain) ESP	Antonio Longás	39	2	39	2	0	0
15	DF	(Spain) ESP	Mairata	29	1	29	1	0	0
16	MF	(Spain) ESP	Dani Abalo	17	0	17	0	0	0
17	DF	(Spain) ESP	Raúl Fuster	16	1	16	1	0	0
18	MF	(Spain) ESP	Tuni	26	3	26	3	0	0
20	MF	(Bolivia) BOL	Samuel Galindo	12	0	12	0	0	0
21	DF	(Spain) ESP	Xisco Campos	30	1	30	1	0	0
22	DF	(Spain) ESP	Manuel Ruz	18	0	18	0	0	0
24	FW	(Spain) ESP	Mikel Orbegozo	11	0	11	0	0	0
26	DF	(Spain) ESP	Sergio Juste	25	0	24	0	1	0
27	DF	(Spain) ESP	Aitor Casas	1	0	0	0	1	0
28	MF	(Spain) ESP	Jordi Roca	1	0	0	0	1	0
29	MF	(Spain) ESP	Fran Carbià	0	0	0	0	0	0
30	DF	(Spain) ESP	Aleix Coch	1	0	0	0	1	0
35	GK	(Spain) ESP	Sergio	0	0	0	0	0	0
39	MF	(Spain) ESP	Alfons Serra	1	0	0	0	1	0
40	GK	(Spain) ESP	Antonio David	0	0	0	0	0	0
41	MF	(Spain) ESP	Bueno	6	0	5	0	1	0
44	FW	(Spain) ESP	Juan Millán	8	0	8	0	0	0
45	MF	(Spain) ESP	Eugeni	5	0	5	0	0	0
51	DF	(Spain) ESP	Galindo	0	0	0	0	0	0
52	MF	(Spain) ESP	Joan	1	0	1	0	0	0
53	FW	(Spain) ESP	Gestí	1	0	1	0	0	0
54	MF	(Spain) ESP	Gabriel Vidal	0	0	0	0	0	0
Players who have left the club after the start of the season:
2	DF	(Spain) ESP	Julio Rico	3	0	2	0	1	0
9	FW	(Netherlands) NED	Berry Powel	20	9	19	9	1	0
11	FW	(Spain) ESP	Eloy	14	0	13	0	1	0
11	FW	(France) FRA	Hugo Bargas	5	0	5	0	0	0
19	MF	(Uruguay) URU	Adrián Luna	19	2	18	2	1	0
23	FW	(Spain) ESP	Borja Viguera	10	0	9	0	1	0
25	MF	(Spain) ESP	Arzu	29	0	29	0	0	0

=== Top scorers ===
Updated on 28 May

Place	Position	Nation	Number	Name	Liga Adelante	Copa del Rey	Total
1	FW	(Netherlands)	9	Berry Powel	9	0	9
2	MF	(Spain)	8	Fernando Morán	8	0	8
3	MF	(Spain)	18	Tuni	3	0	3
3	DF	(Spain)	5	Álex Ortiz	3	0	3
4	MF	(Spain)	4	Rodri	2	0	2
4	MF	(Spain)	14	Antonio Longás	2	0	2
4	MF	(Uruguay)	19	Adrián Luna	2	0	2
5	MF	(Spain)	7	Álvaro Rey	1	0	1
5	FW	(Spain)	10	Roberto Peragón	1	0	1
5	DF	(Spain)	15	Pedro Mairata	1	0	1
5	DF	(Spain)	17	Raúl Fuster	1	0	1
5	DF	(Spain)	21	Xisco Campos	1	0	1
Own Goals					3	0	3
				TOTALS	37	0	37

=== Disciplinary record ===
Updated on 4 June 2012

Number	Nation	Position	Name	Liga Adelante		Copa del Rey		Total	
Number	Nation	Position	Name	Yellow card	Red card	Yellow card	Red card	Yellow card	Red card
3	(Spain)	DF	Mingo	10	0	0	0	10	0
21	(Spain)	DF	Xisco Campos	10	0	0	0	10	0
4	(Spain)	MF	Rodri	9	1	0	0	9	1
14	(Spain)	MF	Antonio Longás	8	0	0	0	8	0
17	(Spain)	DF	Raúl Fuster	8	0	0	0	8	0
8	(Spain)	MF	Fernando Morán	7	0	0	0	7	0
6	(Spain)	MF	Fernando Seoane	6	0	0	0	6	0
25	(Spain)	MF	Arzu	6	0	0	0	6	0
15	(Spain)	DF	Pedro Mairata	5	1	0	0	5	1
7	(Spain)	MF	Álvaro Rey	5	0	0	0	5	0
18	(Spain)	MF	Tuni	4	0	0	0	4	0
22	(Spain)	DF	Manuel Ruz	4	0	0	0	4	0
1	(Spain)	GK	Rubén Pérez	3	0	0	0	3	0
5	(Spain)	DF	Álex Ortiz	3	0	0	0	3	0
9	(Netherlands)	FW	Berry Powel	3	0	0	0	3	0
19	(Uruguay)	FW	Adrián Luna	3	0	0	0	3	0
26	(Spain)	DF	Sergio Juste	3	0	0	0	3	0
10	(Spain)	FW	Roberto Peragón	2	0	0	0	2	0
23	(Spain)	FW	Borja Viguera	2	0	0	0	2	0
16	(Spain)	MF	Dani Abalo	1	0	0	0	1	0
20	(Bolivia)	MF	Samuel Galindo	1	0	0	0	1	0
24	(Spain)	FW	Mikel Orbegozo	1	0	0	0	1	0
44	(Spain)	FW	Juan Millán	1	0	0	0	1	0
45	(Spain)	MF	Eugeni	1	0	0	0	1	0
			TOTALS	104	2	0	0	104	2

== Season results ==
=== Segunda División ===
Pos	Team	Pld	W	D	L	GF	GA	GD	Pts	Promotion, qualification or relegation
18	Murcia	42	13	8	21	49	67	−18	47 (Note: REC 0–2 MUR; MUR 0–3 REC)	
19	Sabadell	42	11	13	18	45	64	−19	46	
20	Cartagena (R)	42	9	13	20	37	58	−21	40	Relegation to Segunda División B
21	Alcoyano (R)	42	9	10	23	46	78	−32	37	Relegation to Segunda División B
22	Gimnàstic (R)	42	6	13	23	37	58	−21	31	Relegation to Segunda División B

Source: LFP - Liga Adelante
Rules for classification: 1st points; 2nd head-to-head points; 3rd head-to-head goal difference; 4th head-to-head goals scored; 5th goal difference; 6th number of goals scored; 7th Fair-play points
(R) Relegated

==== Results summary ====
Overall								Home						Away					
Pld	W	D	L	GF	GA	GD	Pts	W	D	L	GF	GA	GD	W	D	L	GF	GA	GD
43	6	13	24	37	57	−20	31	3	6	13	17	26	−9	3	7	11	20	31	−11

Last updated: 4 June 2012.
Source: LFP – Liga Adelante

=== Competitive ===
==== Pre-season ====
24 July 2011 Friendly	Gimnàstic	4–0	Balaguer	Rialp
	Powel 11', 29', 51'; Eloy 28'; Rey (red card) 71'	Report

28 July 2011 Friendly	Gimnàstic	3–0	Selección de Tarragona	Rialp
	Eloy 15'; Rey 33'; Rico 71'	Report

30 July 2011 Friendly	Llagostera	1–2	Gimnàstic	Vilobí d'Onyar
	Bayon 57'	Report	24', 27' Powel	Stadium: Municipal de Vilobí d'Onyar

3 August 2011 Friendly	Valencia Mestalla	0–1	Gimnàstic	Paterna
		Report	54' Fuster	Stadium: Ciudad Deportiva de Paterna

5 August 2011 Trofeu Ciutat de Tarragona	Gimnàstic	1–1	Las Palmas	Tarragona
	Eloy 65'	Report	10' Sergio Suárez	Stadium: Nou Estadi; Attendance: 1,971; Referee: Rebollo López

13 August 2011 Friendly	Teruel	0–0	Gimnàstic	Teruel
		Report		Stadium: Pinilla

31 December 2011 Friendly	Gimnàstic	0–1	L'Hospitalet	Tarragona
11:00		Report	Haro 30'	Stadium: Nou Estadi; Attendance: 150

==== 2010–11 Copa Catalunya ====
8 August 2011 Semi final	Gimnàstic	1–2	Espanyol	Tarragona
19:00	Eloy 37'	Report; Marca Report lajornada.cat Report	Forlín (yellow card) 12'; Baena (yellow card) 14'; Rodríguez (yellow card) 23'; Osvaldo 40', 86'; Álvarez 89'	Stadium: Nou Estadi; Attendance: 5,732; Referee: (Catalonia) Álvarez Izquierdo; Man of the Match: Osvaldo

==== 2011–12 Copa Catalunya ====
22 February 2012 Quarter final	Torreforta	1–4	Gimnàstic	Torreforta
	Ibán Parra 28'	Report; Report	Orbegozo 12'; Bargas 15'; Galindo 25'; Oribe 89'	Stadium: Municipal de Torreforta

==== Segunda División ====
28 August 2011 Round 2	Gimnàstic	0–3	Valladolid	Tarragona
20:00	Fuster (yellow card) 6'	Report	(yellow card) 28' Sisi; (yellow card) 29', (goal) 41' Alonso; 32', 43' Bueno; (yellow card) 42' Rubio; (yellow card) 85' Juanito	Stadium: Nou Estadi; Referee: Sureda Cuenca

4 September 2011 Round 3	Numancia	0–0	Gimnàstic	Soria
	Sunny (yellow card) 39'; Ripa (yellow card) 57'	Report	(yellow card) 70' Mairata	Stadium: Estadio Los Pajaritos; Referee: Guerrero Martínez

10 September 2011 Round 4	Gimnàstic	1–3	Las Palmas	Tarragona
	Fuster (yellow card) 27'; Powel 70'	Report	8' 49' Viera; (yellow card) 55' Juanpe; 61' Guerrero; (yellow card) 73' Corrales	Stadium: Nou Estadi; Referee: Ocón Arráiz

17 September 2011 Round 5	Xerez	0–0	Gimnàstic	Jerez de la Frontera
	Campano (yellow card) 59'; Capi (yellow card) 80'	Report	(yellow card) 18' Campos; (yellow card) 33' Longás; (red card) 83' Rodri; (yellow card) 83' Powel	Stadium: Estadio Municipal de Chapín; Referee: Lesma López

24 September 2011 Round 6	Gimnàstic	1–3	Huesca	Tarragona
	Powel (yellow card) 33', (goal) 58'; Luna (yellow card) 52'; Campos (yellow card) 59'	Report	(yellow card) 12' Josetxo; 17', 30', (yellow card) 66' Camacho; (red card) 57' Clavero; (yellow card) 35' Molina; (yellow card) 42' L. Sastre; (yellow card) 44' R. Sastre; (yellow card) 89' Cabrero	Stadium: Nou Estadi; Referee: Piñeiro Crespo

30 September 2011 Round 7	Villarreal B	3–2	Gimnàstic	Villarreal
	Joselu 11' 58' (pen.) 70'; Llorente (yellow card) 25'; Jaume Costa (yellow card) 64'; Pere (red card) 76'	Report	(yellow card) 34' Mingo; 37' (o.g.) Iriome; (yellow card) 58' Ruz; (yellow card) 62' Xisco Campos; 77' (pen.) Powel	Stadium: Ciudad Deportiva; Attendance: 1,000; Referee: Gil Manzano

9 October 2011 Round 8	Gimnàstic	0–0	Cartagena	Tarragona
18:00	Rodri (yellow card) 36'	Report	(yellow card) 30' Abraham Paz; (yellow card) 36' Toni Moral	Stadium: Nou Estadi; Referee: Juan Martínez Munuera

15 October 2011 Round 9	Deportivo	2–2	Gimnàstic	A Coruña
	Salomão 35'; Aythami (yellow card) 63' (goal) 89'; Laure (yellow card) 89'	Report	(yellow card) 10' Mingo; (yellow card) 59' Ruz; 60' 84' Powel; (yellow card) 74' Tuni; (yellow card) 88' Morán	Stadium: Riazor; Referee: Ricardo de Burgos Bengoetxea

22 October 2011 Round 10	Gimnàstic	0–1	Hércules	Tarragona
18:00	Arzu (yellow card) 17'	Report	(yellow card) 39' Míchel; 56' Pepe Mora; (yellow card) 65' Urko Vera; (yellow card) 75' Callejón; (yellow card) 89' Carlos Calvo	Stadium: Nou Estadi; Referee: Arias López

26 October 2011 Round 1	Almería	3–1	Gimnàstic	Almería
18:00	Ulloa 12' (pen.) 31'; Soriano 53'; Verza (yellow card) 57'	Report	(yellow card) 11' Rodri; 27' Morán	Stadium: Estadio de los Juegos Mediterráneos; Referee: Hernández Hernández

30 October 2011 Round 11	Barcelona B	1–0	Gimnàstic	Barcelona
18:00	Muniesa (yellow card) 7'; Carmona 39'	Report	(yellow card) 78' Seoane; (yellow card) 88' Tuni	Stadium: Mini Estadi; Referee: Amoedo Chas

6 November 2011 Round 12	Gimnàstic	5–0	Sabadell	Tarragona
12:00	Morán 18'; Powel 26', 58'; Tuni 61'; Luna 82'	Report	(yellow card) 11' Olmo; (yellow card) 36' Juanjo	Stadium: Nou Estadi; Referee: Mariscal Sánchez

13 November 2011 Round 13	Alcorcón	0–1	Gimnàstic	Alcorcón
18:00		Report	(yellow card) 22' Morán; (yellow card) 50' Longás; 62' Powel; (yellow card) 65' Luna	Stadium: Santo Domingo; Referee: Prieto Iglesias

18 November 2011 Round 14	Gimnàstic	0–0	Guadalajara	Tarragona
21:00	Mingo (yellow card) 3'	Report	(yellow card) 60' Jonan; (yellow card) 65' Gaffoor	Stadium: Nou Estadi; Referee: Bikandi Garrido

27 November 2011 Round 15	Alcoyano	0–0	Gimnàstic	Alcoy
18:00	Devesa (yellow card) 35'; Fran Miranda (yellow card) 56'; Diego Jiménez (yellow card) 61'	Report	(yellow card) 51' Viguera; (yellow card) 83' Mingo	Stadium: El Collao; Referee: Pino Zamorano

4 December 2011 Round 16	Gimnàstic	1–2	Recreativo	Tarragona
18:00	Borda 10' (o.g.)	Report	2', 80', (yellow card) 61' Enrich; (yellow card) 24' Córcoles; (yellow card) 84' Álamo	Stadium: Nou Estadi; Referee: Lesma López

11 December 2011 Round 17	Gimnàstic	0–0	Córdoba	Tarragona
18:00	Peragón (yellow card) 4'; Seoane (yellow card) 89'	Report	(yellow card) 6' Javi Hervás; (yellow card) 20' López Silva; (red card) 75' Charles	Stadium: Nou Estadi; Referee: José María Sánchez Martínez

17 December 2011 Round 18	Girona	3–2	Gimnàstic	Girona
18:00	Coro 2'; Juanlu (yellow card) 8'; Garmendia (yellow card) 25'; Benja 51'; José (yellow card) 57'; Jandro 65' (yellow card) 89'; Dani Nieto (yellow card) 70'; Rigo (yellow card) 87'	Report	(yellow card) 24' Morán; 42' (yellow card) 65' Luna; 57' Longás; (yellow card) 67' Rodri; (yellow card) 67' Viguera; (yellow card) 70' Raúl Fuster	Stadium: Municipal de Montilivi; Referee: Valdés Aller

7 January 2012 Round 19	Gimnàstic	0–2	Murcia	Tarragona
18:00	Rodri (yellow card) 15'; Arzu (yellow card) 71'; Mingo (yellow card) 77'	Report	8' 88' Ruso; (yellow card) 23' Molinero; (yellow card) 49' Mario Marín; (yellow card) 70' Óscar Sánchez	Stadium: Nou Estadi; Referee: Jaime Latre

14 January 2012 Round 20	Celta	1–0	Gimnàstic	Vigo
21:00	Roberto Lago 54' (yellow card) 85'	Report	(yellow card) 75' Raúl Fuster; (yellow card) 83' Sergio Juste	Stadium: Balaídos; Referee: Melero López

21 January 2012 Round 21	Gimnàstic	1–0	Elche	Tarragona
18:00	Mairata (yellow card) 19' (red card) 89'; Álvaro Rey 26'; Sergio Juste (yellow card) 46'; Seoane (yellow card) 79'; Powel (yellow card) 85'; Longás (yellow card) 87'	Report	(yellow card) 8' Edu Albácar; (yellow card) 25' Javier Flaño; (yellow card) 75' Etxeita; (yellow card) 81' Kike Mateo; (yellow card) 88' Nielsen	Stadium: Nou Estadi; Referee: Arcediano Monescillo

28 January 2012 Round 22	Gimnàstic	1–2	Almería	Tarragona
19:45	Dani Abalo (yellow card) 6'; Mingo (yellow card) 39'; Powel 50'	Report	(yellow card) 16' Rafita; 40' Verza; (yellow card) 49' Carlos García; (yellow card) 70' Acasiete; 89' Aleix	Stadium: Nou Estadi; Referee: Gil Manzano

5 February 2012 Round 23	Valladolid	4–0	Gimnàstic	Valladolid
16:00	Óscar González 22', 37', 45'; Javi Guerra 80'	Summary	Fernando Seoane (yellow card) 13'; Arzu (yellow card) 59'	Stadium: José Zorrilla; Attendance: 7,900; Referee: Antonio Israel Mariscal Sánchez

11 February 2012 Round 24	Gimnàstic	1–1	Numancia	Tarragona
18:00	Pavón 29'; Raúl Fuster (yellow card) 57'; Ruz (yellow card) 78'	Summary	Cabrera (yellow card) 44'; Jaio (yellow card) 58'; Pavón (yellow card) 60'; Javier Del Pino (yellow card) 75'; Javier Del Pino 80'	Stadium: Nou Estadi; Attendance: 3,170; Referee: Ricardo de Burgos Bengoetxea

19 February 2012 Round 25	Las Palmas	1–0	Gimnàstic	Las Palmas
18:30	Jonathan Viera 8'; Pignol (yellow card) 11'; Corrales (yellow card) 26' (yellow-red card) 28'; Roque Mesa (yellow card) 89'	Summary	Xisco Campos (yellow card) 3'; Rodri (yellow card) 15'; Arzu (yellow card) 30'; Roberto Peragón (yellow card) 43'; Mairata (yellow card) 60'; Tuni (yellow card) 78'; Orbegozo (yellow card) 80'; Morán (yellow card) 84'	Stadium: Gran Canaria; Attendance: 9,187; Referee: Fernando López Acera

25 February 2012 Round 26	Gimnàstic	0–1	Xerex	Tarragona
18:00	Xisco Campos (yellow card) 43'; Sergio Juste (yellow card) 56'	Summary	Barber (yellow card) 19'; José Marí 35'; Israel (yellow card) 36'; Rafa García (yellow card) 46'	Stadium: Nou Estadi; Attendance: 3,641; Referee: Alejandro José Hernández Hernández

3 March 2012 Round 27	Huesca	0–0	Gimnàstic	Huesca
18:00	Sorribas (yellow card) 22'; Helguera (yellow card) 52'	Report	(yellow card) 28' Mingo; (yellow card) 43' Longás; (yellow card) 66' Seoane	Stadium: Estadio El Alcoraz; Referee: Arcediano Monescillo

10 March 2012 Round 28	Gimnàstic	0–1	Villarreal B	Tarragona
18:00	Longás (yellow card) 35'; Rodri (yellow card) 38'; Xisco Campos (yellow card) 71'	Report	Toño (yellow card) 8'; Truyols (yellow card) 61'; Lucas 69'	Stadium: Nou Estadi; Referee: Melero López

17 March 2012 Round 29	Cartagena	1–3	Gimnàstic	Cartagena
18:00	Abraham Paz (yellow card) 11'; Txiki (yellow card) 33'; Braulio (yellow card) 41' (goal) 52'; Kijera (yellow card) 45'; Collantes (yellow card) 48'; Lafuente (yellow card) 67'; Josemi (yellow card) 89'	Report	(yellow card) 52' Rubén Pérez; (yellow card) 56' Millán; 53' 63' Morán; (yellow card) 78' Tuni; (yellow card) 80' Mingo; 85' Álex Ortiz	Stadium: Cartagonova; Referee: Jaime Latre

24 March 2012 Round 31	Hércules	1–3	Gimnàstic	Alicante
16:00	José Francisco (yellow card) 15'; Aguilar (yellow card) 38'; Samuel (yellow card) 40'; Carlos Calvo (yellow card) 43'; Gilvas 50'; Urko Vera (yellow card) 72'; Paco Peña (yellow card) 89'	Report	38' 89' Morán; (yellow card) 40' Álvaro Rey; (yellow card) 40' (goal) 44' Rodri; (yellow card) 54' Galindo; (yellow card) 84' Longás	Stadium: José Rico Pérez; Referee: Hernández Hernández

31 March 2012 Round 32	Gimnàstic	1–1	Barcelona B	Tarragona
18:00	Xisco Campos (yellow card) 26'; Morán 62'; Arzu (yellow card) 74'; Álex Ortiz (yellow card) 82'; Mingo (yellow card) 88'	Report	37' (yellow card) 89' Lobato; (yellow card) 62' Bartra; (yellow card) 62' Balliu	Stadium: Nou Estadi; Referee: Mariscal Sánchez

7 April 2012 Round 33	Sabadell	1–0	Gimnàstic	Sabadell
18:00	Aarón Bueno 19'; Hidalgo (yellow card) 49'; Juanjo (yellow card) 56'; Agustín (red card) 87'; Juvenal (yellow card) 89'	Report	(yellow card) 23' Álex Ortiz; (yellow card) 77' Longás	Stadium: Nova Creu Alta; Referee: Melero López

15 April 2012 Round 34	Gimnàstic	0–2	Alcorcón	Tarragona
19:45	Xisco Campos (yellow card) 86'; Mingo (yellow card) 87'; Morán (yellow card) 89'	Report	23' Quini; (yellow card) 60' Sales; (yellow card) 64' Nagore; (yellow card) 75' Montañés; (yellow card) 85' Ángel; 86' Oriol Riera	Stadium: Nou Estadi; Referee: Jaime Latre

21 April 2012 Round 35	Guadalajara	1–0	Gimnàstic	Guadalajara
18:00	Javi Soria 61'; Jony (yellow card) 87'	Report	(yellow card) 31' Arzu; (yellow card) 61' Mairata; (yellow card) 73' Álvaro Rey	Stadium: Pedro Escartín; Referee: Juan Martínez Munuera

28 April 2012 Round 36	Gimnàstic	2–0	Alcoyano	Tarragona
18:00	Morán 9'; Raúl Fuster (yellow card) 32'; Rodri 69'; Mairata (yellow card) 89'	Report	(yellow card) 6' Rojas; (yellow card) 71' Xavi Molina	Stadium: Nou Estadi; Referee: Arcediano Monescillo

6 May 2012 Round 37	Recreativo	2–2	Gimnàstic	Huelva
12:00	Berrocal 12'; Matamala 89'	Report	25' Álex Ortiz; (yellow card) 41' Morán; 78' Tuni	Stadium: Nuevo Colombino; Referee: Lesma López

11 May 2012 Round 38	Córdoba	4–2	Gimnàstic	Córdoba
21:00 CET (UTC+01)	Gaspar 25'; Pepe Díaz (yellow card) 31' (goal) 39'; Borja 56'; Dubarbier 60'	Report	51' Tuni; (yellow card) 59' Rubén Pérez; (yellow card) 61' Álvaro Rey; (yellow card) 75' Eugeni; 81' (yellow card) 87' Raúl Fuster	Stadium: Estadio Nuevo Arcángel; Referee: Ocón Arráiz

16 May 2012 Round 39	Gimnàstic	1–1	Girona	Tarragona
20:00 CET (UTC+01)	Ruz (yellow card) 8'; Mairata 12'; Longás (yellow card) 85'	Report	(yellow card) 16' Migue; (yellow card) 47' Junca; 50' Juanlu; (yellow card) 64' Luso; (yellow card) 73' Garmendia; (yellow card) 76' Nieto; (yellow card) 80' Moha	Stadium: Nou Estadi; Referee: Prieto Iglesias

19 May 2012 Round 40	Real Murcia	2–2	Gimnàstic	Murcia
18:00	Óscar Sánchez (yellow card) 44'; Jorge (yellow card) 58'; García Ruso 63'; Borja 72'; Pedro (yellow card) 85'	Report	59' (pen.) (yellow card) 68' Álex Ortiz; 74' Peragón; (yellow card) 76' Álvaro Rey	Stadium: Estadio Nueva Condomina; Referee: Ricardo de Burgos Bengoetxea

22 May 2012 Round 30	Gimnàstic	1–2	Deportivo	Tarragona
22:00	Xisco Campos 12'; Raúl Fuster (yellow card) 24'; Rodri (yellow card) 32'; Seoane (yellow card) 69'; Rubén Pérez (yellow card) 89'; Morán (yellow card) 89'	Report	30' Bruno Gama; (yellow card) 59' Morel; (yellow card) 76' Borja; (yellow card) 89' Riki; (yellow card) 89' (goal) 90+4' Xisco	Stadium: Nou Estadi; Referee: José María Sánchez Martínez

26 May 2012 Round 41	Gimnàstic	1–2	Celta Vigo	Tarragona
20:00	Rodri (yellow card) 3'; Xisco Campos (yellow card) 41'; Longás 66'; Álvaro Rey (yellow card) 89'	Report	5' (pen.) Iago Aspas; (yellow card) 11' (goal) 45+1' Natxo Insa; (yellow card) 27' Toni	Stadium: Nou Estadi; Referee: Fernando López Acera

2 June 2012 Round 42	Elche	1–0	Gimnàstic	Elche
19:30	Cristóbal 36'; Nielsen (yellow card) 78'	Report	(yellow card) 83' Xisco Campos	Stadium: Estadio Manuel Martínez Valero; Referee: Melero López

==== Copa del Rey ====
8 September 2011 Second Round	Real Valladolid	6–0	Gimnàstic	Valladolid
20:00 CEST	Pérez 4'; Jofre 11'; Nafti (yellow card) 17'; Nauzet 22', 40', 43', 58'; Balenziaga (yellow card) 73'	(Report)		Stadium: Nuevo José Zorrilla; Attendance: 6,671; Referee: (Aragon) Jaime Latre

== 2011–12 Kits ==
The current kits are manufactured by Nàstic, a brand of the club.

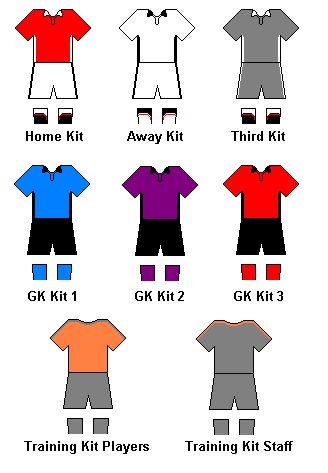
