= 2009–10 Gimnàstic de Tarragona season =

Gimnàstic de Tarragona
2010–11 season
- President: José María Fernández
- Manager: César Ferrando(until 6 March); Luis César Sampedro (from 6 March)
- Liga Adelante: 18th
- Copa del Rey: Second Qualifying Round
- Top goalscorer: Campano and Morán (7)

Is the 2009–10 Gimnàstic de Tarragona season. The club plays in two tournaments: the Segunda División and the Copa del Rey.

== Squad ==
Note: Flags indicate national team as defined under FIFA eligibility rules; some limited exceptions apply. Players may hold more than one non-FIFA nationality.

No.	Pos.	Nation	Player
1	GK	(Spain) ESP	Rubén Pérez
2	MF	(Spain) ESP	Alejandro Campano
3	DF	(Spain) ESP	Mingo
4	DF	(Spain) ESP	Jorge García
5	DF	(France) FRA	Walid Cherfa
6	MF	(Spain) ESP	David Medina
7	FW	(Spain) ESP	Roberto
8	FW	(Spain) ESP	José Mari
9	FW	(Spain) ESP	Rubén Navarro
10	MF	(Spain) ESP	Pablo Redondo
11	FW	(Cameroon) CMR	Serge N'Gal
12	MF	(Colombia) COL	Mauricio Arroyo
13	GK	(Spain) ESP	Xabi Pascual

No.	Pos.	Nation	Player
14	MF	(Spain) ESP	Vicente
15	DF	(Spain) ESP	Pedro Mairata
16	MF	(Spain) ESP	Líbero Parri
17	MF	(Spain) ESP	Fernando Morán
18	MF	(Senegal) SEN	César Diop
19	MF	(Spain) ESP	David Bauzá
20	MF	(Spain) ESP	Álex Cruz
21	MF	(Spain) ESP	Miguel Ángel
22	DF	(Spain) ESP	Biel Medina
23	DF	(Spain) ESP	Curro Torres
24	MF	(Spain) ESP	Walter
25	GK	(Spain) ESP	Felip
30	DF	(France) FRA	Marc Fachan

=== Youth Squad ===
Youth players with first team experience
Note: Flags indicate national team as defined under FIFA eligibility rules; some limited exceptions apply. Players may hold more than one non-FIFA nationality.

No.	Pos.	Nation	Player
44	MF	(Spain) ESP	Aleix Vidal
45	DF	(Spain) ESP	Aleix Coch
46	DF	(Spain) ESP	Aitor Casas
50	DF	(Spain) ESP	Vélez

== League table ==
Pos	Team	Pld	W	D	L	GF	GA	GD	Pts	Promotion or relegation
16	Salamanca	42	13	13	16	44	54	−10	52 (Note: CEL: 13 pts; HUE: 12 pts; GIR: 11 pts; ALB: 9 pts; SAL: 8 pts)	
17	Las Palmas	42	12	15	15	49	49	0	51 (Note: GIM 2–1 LPA; LPA 1–0 GIM)	
18	Gimnàstic	42	14	9	19	42	55	−13	51	
19	Cádiz (R)	42	12	14	16	49	64	−15	50 (Note: MUR 2–2 CAD; CAD 1–0 MUR)	Relegation to Segunda División B
20	Murcia (R)	42	11	17	14	49	51	−2	50	Relegation to Segunda División B

Source: LFP – Liga Adelante
Rules for classification: 1st points; 2nd head-to-head points; 3rd head-to-head goal difference; 4th head-to-head goals scored; 5th goal difference; 6th number of goals scored; 7th Fair-play points
(R) Relegated
