= List of Gimnàstic de Tarragona seasons =

This is a list of seasons played by Club Gimnàstic de Tarragona, S.A.D. in Spanish and European football, from 1943 (the year of the club's first appearance in Tercera División) to the most recent completed season.

This list details the club's achievements in all major competitions, and the top scorers for each season. Top scorers in bold were also the top scorers in the Spanish league that season. Only Copa del Rey is included.

== Seasons ==
Season	League									Copa del Rey	Top Goalscorer	
Season	Division	P	W	D	L	F	A	Pts	Pos	Copa del Rey	Name	Goals
1940–41 Details	Reg	18	1	2	15	14	51	4	2nd	–		
1941–42 Details	Reg 2	18	11	3	4	53	25	25	3rd	–		
1942–43 Details	Reg	18	9	5	4	29	27	23	2nd	–		
1943–44 Details	Ter	18	10	3	5	49	25	23	2nd	–		
1944–45 Details	Ter	18	15	2	1	50	12	32	1st	–		
1945–46 Details	Seg	26	12	5	9	50	46	29	3rd	–	Luis Barceló	14
1946–47 Details	Seg	26	16	3	7	67	42	35	2nd	SF	Francisco Peralta	24
1947–48 Details	Pri	26	10	14	12	49	55	24	7th	R32	Francisco Peralta	20
1948–49 Details	Pri	26	10	3	13	59	72	23	9th	QF	Juan Gallardo	14
1949–50 Details	Pri	26	7	2	17	39	99	16	13th	R16	José Bravo	8
1950–51 Details	Seg	32	12	4	16	56	66	28	15th	–	Bartolomé Murillo	19
1951–52 Details	Seg	30	9	10	11	51	71	28	13th	–	César Rueda	12
1952–53 Details	Seg	30	10	5	15	37	56	25	14th	–	Jaume Carbonell; Dani Solé	7
1953–54 Details	Ter	36	17	2	17	72	77	36	10th	–		
1954–55 Details	Ter	18	10	4	4	38	17	24	1st	–		
1955–56 Details	Ter	22	11	4	7	36	32	26	4th	–		
1956–57 Details	Ter	46	22	8	16	94	68	52	6th	–		
1957–58 Details	Ter	42	17	10	15	71	75	44	8th	–		
1958–59 Details	Ter	34	19	7	8	55	37	45	2nd	–		
1959–60 Details	Ter	30	11	6	13	46	41	28	9th	–		
1960–61 Details	Ter	30	18	10	2	74	30	46	1st	–		
1961–62 Details	Ter	30	17	7	6	74	39	41	3rd	–		
1962–63 Details	Ter	30	15	5	10	53	41	35	6th	–		
1963–64 Details	Ter	38	21	10	7	74	42	52	3rd	–		
1964–65 Details	Ter	38	20	6	12	71	50	46	3rd	–		
1965–66 Details	Ter	38	23	7	8	69	29	53	1st	–		
1966–67 Details	Ter	38	22	4	12	65	41	48	2nd	–		
1967–68 Details	Ter	38	19	10	9	83	45	48	3rd	–		
1968–69 Details	Ter	38	27	3	8	83	34	57	2nd	–		
1969–70 Details	Ter	38	18	10	10	61	44	46	7th	–		
1970–71 Details	Ter	38	12	11	15	44	52	35	13th	–		
1971–72 Details	Ter	38	19	12	7	48	25	50	1st	–		
1972–73 Details	Seg	38	12	9	17	35	48	33	16th	R4	Alfonso Alarcón	8
1973–74 Details	Seg	38	16	9	13	46	40	41	6th	R4	Juan Lloret	13
1974–75 Details	Seg	38	11	13	14	34	36	35	13th	R32	Waldemar Cáceres	6
1975–76 Details	Seg	38	10	8	20	29	54	28	20th	R3	Waldemar Cáceres	9
1976–77 Details	Ter	38	15	8	15	33	36	38	11th	R2		
1977–78 Details	Ter	38	22	6	10	70	28	50	1st	R2		
1978–79 Details	Seg B	38	18	16	4	42	22	52	2nd	R3		
1979–80 Details	Seg	38	8	11	19	29	61	27	19th	R4	Ismael Bañeras; Nando	5
1980–81 Details	Seg B	38	11	17	10	37	35	39	9th	R1		
1981–82 Details	Seg B	38	14	10	14	38	31	38	11th	R2		
1982–83 Details	Seg B	38	15	12	11	38	30	42	5th	–	Román Cunillera	7
1983–84 Details	Seg B	38	19	9	10	57	38	47	5th	R2	Ramón Masqué	17
1984–85 Details	Seg B	38	13	9	16	41	44	35	13th	R1	Ramón Masqué	20
1985–86 Details	Seg B	38	15	6	17	43	42	36	14th	–	Dani Gallardo	13
1986–87 Details	Ter	38	16	14	8	43	33	46	4th	–		
1987–88 Details	Seg B	38	13	13	12	56	42	39	8th	R4	Xavier Escaich	25
1988–89 Details	Seg B	38	13	14	11	54	44	40	9th	R2	Manuel Escribano	16
1989–90 Details	Seg B	38	9	13	16	31	39	31	17th	–	Ramón Masqué	6
1990–91 Details	Ter	38	20	8	10	66	40	48	2nd	–		
1991–92 Details	Seg B	38	13	14	11	45	41	40	9th	R3	Oribe	8
1992–93 Details	Seg B	38	14	9	15	43	54	37	10th	R1	Salvador Soriano	18
1993–94 Details	Seg B	38	15	9	14	56	47	39	11th	–	Kiko Ramírez	12
1994–95 Details	Seg B	38	9	15	14	45	45	33	16th	–	Gerard Escoda	10
1995–96 Details	Seg B	38	20	9	9	72	44	69	2nd	–	Fran	15
1996–97 Details	Seg B	38	21	12	5	52	27	75	1st	R1	José Preciado	13
1997–98 Details	Seg B	38	11	13	14	37	43	46	15th	R1	Luis Gil	7
1998–99 Details	Seg B	38	11	11	16	45	50	44	16th	–	Fran	11
1999–00 Details	Seg B	38	14	10	14	43	44	52	9th	–	Kali Garido	11
2000–01 Details	Seg B	38	19	11	8	52	30	68	2nd	–	**Santi Castillejo**	21
2001–02 Details	Seg	38	12	13	17	45	49	49	20th	R16	José Luis Deus; Ángel Cuéllar	9
2002–03 Details	Seg B	38	13	14	11	46	42	53	9th	R2	Xavi Molist	9
2003–04 Details	Seg B	38	19	10	9	59	32	67	3rd	–	Diego Torres	20
2004–05 Details	Seg	42	16	12	14	49	45	60	7th	R3	Diego Torres	13
2005–06 Details	Seg	42	23	7	12	48	38	76	2nd	R3	Ismael Irurzun	11
2006–07 Details	Pri	38	7	7	24	34	69	28	20th	R32	Javier Portillo	11
2007–08 Details	Seg	38	12	16	14	49	51	52	14th	R2	Alejandro Campano	7
2008–09 Details	Seg	38	14	15	13	60	50	57	10th	R2	Víctor Casadesús	14
2009–10 Details	Seg	38	14	9	19	42	55	51	18th	R2	Alejandro Campano; Fernando Morán	7
2010–11 Details	Seg	38	12	13	17	37	45	49	18th	R2	Berry Powel	11
2011–12 Details	Seg	42	6	13	23	37	58	31	22nd	R2	Berry Powel	9
2012–13 Details	Seg B	40	15	15	10	53	35	60	6th	R1	Marcos de La Espada	17
2013–14 Details	Seg B	38	18	13	7	52	37	67	4th	R32	Lago Junior	10
2014–15 Details	Seg B	38	21	10	7	51	30	73	1st	R2	Rayco	14
2015–16 Details	Seg	42	18	17	7	57	41	71	3rd	R3	Naranjo	15
2016–17 Details	Seg	42	12	16	14	47	51	52	14th	R32	Ike Uche	8
2017–18 Details	Seg	42	15	7	20	44	50	52	15th	1R	Manu Barreiro	10
2018–19 Details	Seg	42	9	9	24	30	63	36	20th	1R	Luis Suárez	7
2019–20 Details	Seg B	28	7	10	11	33	38	31	14th	2R	Javi Bonilla; Pedro Martín	5
2020–21 Details	Seg B	26	11	10	5	38	24	43	4th	—	Fran Carbià; Roger Brugué	5
2021–22 Details	Pri Fed	38	16	13	9	41	30	61	4th	1R	Javi Bonilla; Dani Romera	7
2022–23 Details	Pri Fed	38	14	11	13	37	43	53	8th	R32	Guillermo Fernández	9
2023–24 Details	Pri Fed	38	20	10	8	40	24	70	2nd	1R	Pablo Fernández; Jaume Jardí	7
2024–25 Details	Pri Fed	38	16	11	11	59	43	59	5th	2R	Pablo Fernández	12

== Key ==
- P = Played
- W = Games won
- D = Games drawn
- L = Games lost
- F = Goals for
- A = Goals against
- Pts = Points
- Pos = Final position
- Pri = La Liga
- Seg = Segunda División
- Pri Fed = Primera Federación
- Seg B = Segunda División B
- Ter = Tercera División
- UC = UEFA Cup
- CL = UEFA Champions League
- n/a = Not applicable
- R1 = Round 1
- R2 = Round 2
- R3 = Round 3
- R32 = Round of 16
- R16 = Round of 16
- QF = Quarter-Finals
- SF = Semi-Finals
- R/U = Runners-up
- W = Winners

Champions	Runners-up	Promoted	Relegated

Note: bold text indicates a competition won.
Note 2: Where fields are left blank, the club did not participate in a competition that season.
