= 2008–09 Hércules CF season =

Hércules CF
2008–09 season
- Head coach: Juan Carlos Mandiá
- Stadium: Estadio José Rico Pérez
- Segunda División: 4th
- Copa del Rey: Round of 32
- Top goalscorer: League: Rubén Navarro (15); All: Rubén Navarro (15)
- Average home league attendance: 11,238
- Biggest win: Hércules 8–0 Sevilla Atlético
Home colours	Away colours

The 2008–09 season was the 90th in the Hércules CF's existence and the club's fourth consecutive season in the second division of Spanish football.

== Players ==
=== First-team squad ===
Note: Flags indicate national team as defined under FIFA eligibility rules; some limited exceptions apply. Players may hold more than one non-FIFA nationality.

No.	Pos.	Nation	Player
1	GK	ESP	Juan Calatayud
2	DF	ESP	Manuel Ruz
3	DF	ESP	Dani Carril
4	MF	ESP	Rodri
5	DF	ESP	Sergio Fernández
6	MF	ESP	Javier Farinós
7	MF	ESP	Álvaro Cámara
8	MF	ESP	Fernando Morán
9	FW	ESP	Rubén Navarro
10	FW	ESP	Tote
11	MF	ESP	Sendoa
14	MF	COL	Abel Aguilar
15	DF	ESP	Abraham Paz
16	MF	ESP	Javi González
17	DF	ESP	Unai Expósito
18	MF	ESP	Gerardo Noriega
19	MF	ESP	Fernando Sales

No.	Pos.	Nation	Player
20	DF	ESP	César Martín
21	DF	ESP	Dani Bautista
22	FW	URU	Sebastián Taborda
23	FW	MNE	Andrija Delibašić
24	MF	ESP	Tuni
25	GK	ESP	Unai Alba
26	MF	ESP	Manuel Santacruz
27	FW	ESP	Raúl Ruiz
28	FW	ESP	Luisao
29	DF	ESP	Sergio Serrano
30	GK	ESP	Efrén
31	DF	ESP	Kiko Femenía
32	GK	ESP	Celso
33	MF	ESP	Alberto Calero
36	MF	ESP	Pagán
—	DF	ESP	Sergio Alejandro

== Competitions ==
=== Overall record ===
Competition	First match	Last match	Starting round	Final position	Record							
Competition	First match	Last match	Starting round	Final position	Pld	W	D	L	GF	GA	GD	Win %
Segunda División	31 August 2008	20 June 2009	Matchday 1	4th	42	21	15	6	82	43	+39	50.00
Copa del Rey	3 September 2008	12 November 2008	Second round	Round of 32	3	2	0	1	6	8	−2	66.67
Total					45	23	15	7	88	51	+37	51.11

Source: Competitions

=== Segunda División ===
==== League table ====
Pos	Team	Pld	W	D	L	GF	GA	GD	Pts	Promotion or relegation
2	Zaragoza (P)	42	23	12	7	79	42	+37	81 (Note: TEN 1–2 ZAR; ZAR 1–1 TEN)	Promotion to La Liga
3	Tenerife (P)	42	24	9	9	79	47	+32	81	Promotion to La Liga
4	Hércules	42	21	15	6	82	43	+39	78	
5	Rayo Vallecano	42	18	16	8	55	39	+16	70	
6	Real Sociedad	42	17	16	9	48	38	+10	67	

Source: LFP – Liga Adelante
Rules for classification: 1st points; 2nd head-to-head points; 3rd head-to-head goal difference; 4th head-to-head goals scored; 5th goal difference; 6th number of goals scored; 7th Fair-play points
(P) Promoted

==== Results summary ====
Overall								Home						Away					
Pld	W	D	L	GF	GA	GD	Pts	W	D	L	GF	GA	GD	W	D	L	GF	GA	GD
42	21	15	6	82	43	+39	78	12	8	1	49	21	+28	9	7	5	33	22	+11

Source: BDFutbol

==== Results by round ====
Round	1	2	3	4	5	6	7	8	9	10	11	12	13	14	15	16	17	18	19	20	21	22	23	24	25	26	27	28	29	30	31	32	33	34	35	36	37	38	39	40	41	42
Ground	A	H	A	H	A	H	A	H	H	A	H	A	H	A	H	A	H	A	H	A	H	H	A	H	A	H	A	H	A	A	H	A	H	A	H	A	H	A	H	A	H	A
Result	W	D	W	D	D	W	D	D	W	W	D	L	D	D	W	L	W	L	L	W	D	W	L	W	W	W	D	W	D	W	W	L	W	D	D	W	W	D	D	W	W	W
Position	1	5	1	1	3	1	2	3	2	1	2	3	4	4	4	3	4	5	5	4	3	3	7	6	4	3	3	2	3	3	2	4	4	4	4	4	4	4	4	4	4	4

Source: BDFutbol
A = Away; H = Home; W = Win; D = Draw; L = Loss

==== Matches ====
31 August 2008 1	Córdoba	0–3	Hércules	Córdoba
CET (UTC+1)				Stadium: Estadio Nuevo Arcángel

6 September 2008 2	Hércules	1–1	Rayo Vallecano	Alicante
CET (UTC+1)				Stadium: Estadio José Rico Pérez

14 September 2008 3	Levante	0–2	Hércules	Valencia
CET (UTC+1)				Stadium: Estadi Ciutat de València

21 September 2008 4	Hércules	1–1	Real Sociedad	Alicante
CET (UTC+1)				Stadium: Estadio José Rico Pérez

27 September 2008 5	Las Palmas	1–1	Hércules	Las Palmas
CET (UTC+1)				Stadium: Estadio Gran Canaria

4 October 2008 6	Hércules	2–1	Zaragoza	Alicante
CET (UTC+1)				Stadium: Estadio José Rico Pérez

11 October 2008 7	Murcia	0–0	Hércules	Murcia
CET (UTC+1)				Stadium: Estadio Nueva Condomina

19 October 2008 8	Hércules	0–0	Elche	Alicante
CET (UTC+1)				Stadium: Estadio José Rico Pérez

26 October 2008 9	Hércules	3–0	Alavés	Alicante
CET (UTC+1)				Stadium: Estadio José Rico Pérez

2 November 2008 10	Sevilla Atlético	1–2	Hércules	Sevilla
CET (UTC+1)				Stadium: Ramón Sánchez Pizjuán

9 November 2008 11	Hércules	0–0	Xerez	Alicante
CET (UTC+1)				Stadium: Estadio José Rico Pérez

16 November 2008 12	Girona	1–0	Hércules	Girona
CET (UTC+1)				Stadium: Montilivi

22 November 2008 13	Hércules	0–0	Castellón	Alicante
CET (UTC+1)				Stadium: Estadio José Rico Pérez

30 November 2008 14	Gimnàstic	2–2	Hércules	Tarragona
CET (UTC+1)				Stadium: Nou Estadi de Tarragona

7 December 2008 15	Hércules	2–0	Eibar	Alicante
CET (UTC+1)				Stadium: Estadio José Rico Pérez

14 December 2008 16	Tenerife	3–2	Hércules	Santa Cruz de Tenerife
CET (UTC+1)				Stadium: Heliodoro Rodríguez López

20 December 2008 17	Hércules	3–2	Huesca	Alicante
CET (UTC+1)				Stadium: Estadio José Rico Pérez

4 January 2009 18	Celta Vigo	2–1	Hércules	Vigo
CET (UTC+1)				Stadium: Balaídos

10 January 2009 19	Hércules	1–2	Alicante	Alicante
CET (UTC+1)				Stadium: Estadio José Rico Pérez

17 January 2009 20	Albacete	0–3	Hércules	Albacete
CET (UTC+1)				Stadium: Estadio Carlos Belmonte

25 January 2009 21	Hércules	2–2	Salamanca	Alicante
CET (UTC+1)				Stadium: Estadio José Rico Pérez

31 January 2009 22	Hércules	1–0	Córdoba	Alicante
CET (UTC+1)				Stadium: Estadio José Rico Pérez

7 February 2009 23	Rayo Vallecano	1–0	Hércules	Madrid
CET (UTC+1)				Stadium: Campo de Fútbol de Vallecas

14 February 2009 24	Hércules	4–2	Levante	Alicante
CET (UTC+1)				Stadium: Estadio José Rico Pérez

22 February 2009 25	Real Sociedad	1–2	Hércules	San Sebastián
CET (UTC+1)				Stadium: Anoeta Stadium

28 February 2009 26	Hércules	4–2	Las Palmas	Alicante
CET (UTC+1)				Stadium: Estadio José Rico Pérez

8 March 2009 27	Zaragoza	2–2	Hércules	Zaragoza
CET (UTC+1)				Stadium: La Romareda

15 March 2009 28	Hércules	3–2	Murcia	Alicante
CET (UTC+1)				Stadium: Estadio José Rico Pérez

22 March 2009 29	Elche	2–2	Hércules	Elche
CET (UTC+1)				Stadium: Estadio Manuel Martínez Valero

29 March 2009 30	Alavés	1–3	Hércules	Vitoria-Gasteiz
CET (UTC+1)				Stadium: Mendizorrotza Stadium

5 April 2009 31	Hércules	8–0	Sevilla Atlético	Alicante
CET (UTC+1)				Stadium: Estadio José Rico Pérez

11 April 2009 32	Xerez	3–0	Hércules	Jerez de la Frontera
CET (UTC+1)				Stadium: Estadio Municipal de Chapín

19 April 2009 33	Hércules	3–0	Girona	Alicante
CET (UTC+1)				Stadium: Estadio José Rico Pérez

25 April 2009 34	Castellón	0–0	Hércules	Castellón de la Plana
CET (UTC+1)				Stadium: Nou Estadi Castàlia

3 May 2009 35	Hércules	2–2	Gimnàstic	Alicante
CET (UTC+1)				Stadium: Estadio José Rico Pérez

9 May 2009 36	Eibar	0–1	Hércules	Eibar
CET (UTC+1)				Stadium: Ipurua

16 May 2009 37	Hércules	3–1	Tenerife	Alicante
CET (UTC+1)				Stadium: Estadio José Rico Pérez; Referee: José Luis González González

24 May 2009 38	Huesca	0–0	Hércules	Huesca
CET (UTC+1)				Stadium: El Alcoraz

31 May 2009 39	Hércules	2–2	Celta Vigo	Alicante
CET (UTC+1)				Stadium: Estadio José Rico Pérez

6 June 2009 40	Alicante	1–2	Hércules	Alicante
CET (UTC+1)				Stadium: Estadio José Rico Pérez

13 June 2009 41	Hércules	4–1	Albacete	Alicante
CET (UTC+1)				Stadium: Estadio José Rico Pérez

20 June 2009 42	Salamanca	1–5	Hércules	Villares de la Reina
CET (UTC+1)				Stadium: Helmántico Stadium
