= Rubén Pérez =

Rubén Pérez may refer to:

- Rubén Pérez (cyclist) (born 1981), Spanish road bicycle racer
- Rubén Pérez (footballer, born 1989), Spanish football defensive midfielder
- Rubén Pérez (footballer, born 1980), Spanish football goalkeeper
