= David Panadès =

Spanish footballer

Personal information
- Full name: David Panadès Codina
- Birth name: David Panadès i Codina
- Date of birth: 28 June 1920
- Place of birth: Barcelona, Spain
- Date of death: 23 July 2003 (aged 83)
- Place of death: Barcelona, Spain
- Position: Forward

Senior career*
| Years | Team | Apps | (Gls) |
| 1942–1945 | Sants | | |
| 1945–1946 | Igualada | | |
| 1946–1948 | Gimnàstic de Tarragona | | |
| 1948–1949 | Espanyol | | |
| 1949–1950 | Real Murcia | | |
| 1950–1951 | SD Escoriaza Zaragoza | | |
| 1951–1952 | Júpiter | | |
| 1952–1953 | Igualada | | |

International career
| 1947–1953 | Catalonia | 3 | (0) |
- * Club domestic league appearances and goals

David Panadès Codina (28 June 1920 – 23 July 2003) was a Spanish footballer who played as a forward for Espanyol and Real Murcia. He also played thrice for the Catalan national team.

== Club career ==
Born on 28 June 1920 in Barcelona, Panadès began his football career at his hometown club Sants in 1942, aged 22, with whom he played for three years, until 1945, standing out due to his speed and good dribbling. After playing the 1945–46 season with Igualada, Panadès joined Gimnàstic de Tarragona, then in the Segunda División, and in his first season at the club, he helped them achieve promotion to La Liga in 1947. In his first season in the Spanish top division, he scored 5 goals in 19 league matches, including a hat-trick against Athletic Bilbao on 28 March 1948, to help his side to a historic 7–1 victory, which still is the club's biggest La Liga victory.

In July 1948, Panadès joined Espanyol, reaching an agreement with Ramón Encinas and Narciso Amigó to sign for one season, which was the only one he played for them, scoring 7 goals in 20 official matches, including 3 goals in 2 Copa del Rey matches, and 4 goals in 18 league matches. In total, he scored 9 goals in 37 La Liga matches for Tarragona and Espanyol. He then played the next four seasons with four different clubs: Real Murcia (1949–50), Escoriaza de Zaragoza, (1950–51), Júpiter (1951–52), and again Igualada (1952–53).

== International career ==
As a player of Espanyol, Júpiter, and Igualada, Panadès was eligible to play for the Catalan national team, for whom he played in three matches, making his debut on 19 October 1947, in a friendly match against Spain at the Sarrià Stadium, helping his side to a 3–1 victory. The following year, on 21 March 1948, he earned his second international cap for Catalonia, this time against a Barcelona XI at Les Corts, helping his side to a 5–3 win.

Panadès played again for Catalonia on 9 August 1953, against a Catalan team from the third and lower divisions at camp Galileu in Sants, in a match for the benefit of Celestino Sánchez (who was in poor health), a former teammate of Alfredo Di Stéfano, who attended the game; Catalonia won 6–0.

== Death ==
Panadès died in Barcelona on 23 July 2003, at the age of 83.

== See also ==
- List of La Liga hat-tricks
