= Fernando Morán =

Fernando Morán may refer to:

- Fernando Morán (footballer), Spanish footballer
- Fernando Morán (politician) (1926-2020), Spanish diplomat and former Minister of Foreign Affairs of Spain

See also:

- Fernando Navarro Morán (born 1989), Mexican footballer
