= Sergi Gestí =

Spanish footballer

Personal information
- Full name: Sergi Gestí Cano
- Date of birth: 14 February 1994 (age 32)
- Place of birth: Valls, Spain
- Height: 1.73 m (5 ft 8 in)
- Position: Winger

Team information
- Current team: Valls

Youth career
- 2011–2013: Gimnàstic

Senior career*
Years	Team	Apps	(Gls)
2012	Gimnàstic	1	(0)
2013–2015	Pobla Mafumet	46	(6)
2015–2016	Vilafranca	26	(3)
2016–2018	Pobla Mafumet	9	(0)
2018	Castelldefels	19	(5)
2018–2019	Vilafranca	31	(4)
2019–2020	Castelldefels	22	(2)
2020–	Valls	5	(0)
- * Club domestic league appearances and goals as of 15 November 2020

Sergi Gestí Cano (born 14 February 1994) is a Spanish footballer who plays for UE Valls as a winger.

== Club career ==
Born in Valls, Tarragona, Catalonia, Gestí began his footballing career on Gimnàstic de Tarragona's youth ranks. He made his debut on 3 June 2012, against Elche CF, after coming off the bench to replace Mairata.

In the 2013 summer Gestí was assigned to the farm team in Tercera División. On 4 July of the following year he renewed his link.

On 30 July 2015 Gestí moved to FC Vilafranca, also in the fourth level. The following year he returned to Pobla, after their relegation from Segunda División B.

On 3 January 2018, Gestí moved to UE Castelldefels also in the fourth division. He continued to appear in the category in the following years, representing Vilafranca, Castelldefels and UE Valls.
