= Aleix Coch =

Spanish footballer

Personal information
- Full name: Aleix Coch Lucena
- Date of birth: 18 October 1991 (age 35)
- Place of birth: Tarragona, Spain
- Height: 1.85 m (6 ft 1 in)
- Position: Centre-back

Team information
- Current team: Algeciras
- Number: 4

Youth career
- 2000–2002: Cusa La Granja
- 2002–2003: Espanyol
- 2003–2004: Cusa La Granja
- 2004–2005: Reus
- 2005–2006: Gimnàstic
- 2006–2008: Reus
- 2008–2010: Gimnàstic

Senior career*
Years	Team	Apps	(Gls)
2010–2012	Pobla Mafumet	60	(5)
2010–2014	Gimnàstic	24	(1)
2014–2016	Hospitalet	62	(0)
2016–2017	Badalona	34	(1)
2017–2022	Sabadell	121	(12)
2022–2023	Fuenlabrada	33	(1)
2023–2024	Cultural Leonesa	28	(1)
2024–	Algeciras	48	(2)
- * Club domestic league appearances and goals as of 10 June 2026

Aleix Coch Lucena (born 18 October 1991) is a Spanish professional footballer who plays as a centre-back for Algeciras.

== Career ==
Born in Tarragona, Catalonia, Coch was a product of local Gimnàstic de Tarragona. In June 2010, while still a youth player, he was called to train with the first team to cover for injured players. On 19 June he made his debut with the main squad, replacing fellow youth graduate Fran Vélez in the 82nd minute of a 1–0 away defeat against UD Las Palmas in the Segunda División championship.

On 10 July 2012, after spending three full seasons with the farm team, Coch was promoted to Nàstic's main roster alongside Sergio López, Ñoño, Eugeni and his cousin Joel Coch. During the campaign he appeared in 13 matches (nine starts, 781 minutes of action), as the club missed out on promotion play-off qualification.

On 20 October 2013, Coch scored his first goal for Gimnàstic, netting the first through a free kick in a 2–1 home win over Valencia CF Mestalla. He was later linked to that opponent in January of the following year, but the deal collapsed.

In July 2014, Coch joined neighbouring CE L'Hospitalet. On 14 July 2016, he moved to fellow third-tier club CF Badalona still in his native region.

On 12 July 2024, Coch signed with Algeciras in the third tier.

== Personal life ==
Coch's family was widely related to football. His father Enric was a goalkeeper, while his uncles Ramón and Santi were a forward and a defender, respectively; his two cousins, Denis and Joel, also represented Pobla.
