= Julio Rico =

Spanish footballer

Personal information
- Full name: Julio Alberto Rico Pardillo
- Date of birth: 11 June 1989 (age 37)
- Place of birth: El Rubio, Spain
- Height: 1.84 m (6 ft 0 in)
- Positions: Centre-back; right-back

Team information
- Current team: Varea
- Number: 16

Youth career
- Écija
- 2001–2008: Betis

Senior career*
| Years | Team | Apps | (Gls) |
| 2008–2010 | Betis C | 31 | (0) |
| 2008–2010 | Betis B | 4 | (0) |
| 2010 | Real Madrid C | 4 | (0) |
| 2010–2011 | Pobla Mafumet | 33 | (7) |
| 2011–2012 | Gimnàstic | 2 | (0) |
| 2012 | → Espanyol B (loan) | 11 | (1) |
| 2012–2013 | Hospitalet | 34 | (4) |
| 2013–2014 | Cultural Leonesa | 28 | (1) |
| 2014–2017 | Logroñés | 67 | (2) |
| 2017–2020 | Burgos | 62 | (4) |
| 2020–2021 | Rayo Majadahonda | 13 | (0) |
| 2021 | Marbella | 12 | (0) |
| 2022 | Ciudad de Lucena | 8 | (0) |
| 2022–2023 | Racing Rioja | 19 | (3) |
| 2023– | Varea | 12 | (1) |
- * Club domestic league appearances and goals as of 19:12, 27 January 2024 (UTC)

Julio Alberto Rico Pardillo (born 11 June 1989) is a Spanish footballer who plays for CD Varea as a centre-back or right-back.

== Club career ==
=== Early years ===
Born in El Rubio, Province of Seville, Andalusia, Rico started playing with Écija Balompié. In 2001 the 12-year-old moved to neighbouring Real Betis, going on to finish his football formation there.

In the following two years, Rubio alternated between the club's third and second teams, appearing in only four Segunda División B games with the latter in two seasons combined.

=== Real Madrid C ===
In mid-February 2010, Rico signed with La Liga giants Real Madrid, being assigned to its C-team. During his four-month spell, he played just four Tercera División matches.

=== Gimnàstic ===
In the summer of 2010, Rico signed with CF Pobla de Mafumet which acted as Gimnàstic de Tarragona's farm team, being first-choice with the fourth division side. In his first season he managed to be the former's third top scorer, behind Albert Virgili and Fran Carbià.

On 23 June 2011, Rico was promoted to Nàstic's first team and signed a two-year contract. On 10 July, he was officially presented by the Catalans.

Rico made his competitive debut with Gimnàstic on 6 August 2011, against RCD Espanyol for the season's Copa Catalunya, coming on as a substitute for striker Berry Powel in the 64th minute of a 1–2 loss. He made his first Segunda División appearance on 4 September, replacing Eloy Gila in a 0–0 draw at CD Numancia; after only two league appearances (three overall), he was loaned to RCD Espanyol B.

=== Journeyman ===
Rico had his contract with Gimnàstic terminated on 31 August 2012. On the same day, he signed with CE L'Hospitalet also of the third level, and on 20 August of the following year he joined fellow league club Cultural y Deportiva Leonesa.

On 2 July 2014, Rico moved to UD Logroñés still in the third tier.
