= Jorge Devesa =

Spanish footballer

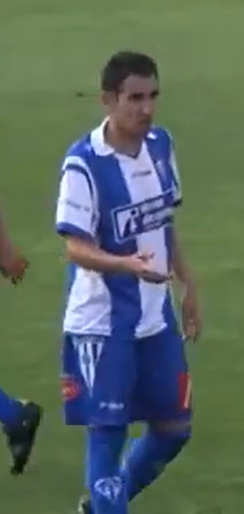
- Devesa playing for Alcoyano in 2013

Personal information
- Full name: Jorge Devesa García
- Date of birth: 18 June 1988 (age 38)
- Place of birth: Alcoy, Spain
- Height: 1.73 m (5 ft 8 in)
- Position: Right back

Team information
- Current team: Ibiza

Youth career
- Alcoyano
- Hércules

Senior career*
Years	Team	Apps	(Gls)
2007–2008	Hércules B	17	(0)
2008–2010	Alcoyano B		
2009–2017	Alcoyano	200	(9)
2017	Cornellà	9	(0)
2017–	Ibiza	29	(0)
- * Club domestic league appearances and goals as of 1 April 2018

Jorge Devesa García (born 18 June 1988 in Alcoy, Alcoià, Valencian Community) is a Spanish footballer who plays for UD Ibiza mainly as a right back.
