= El Rubio =

- city
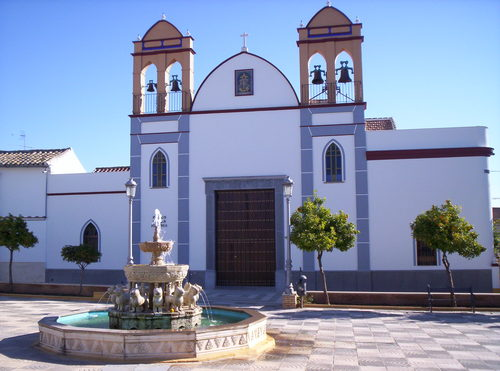
- Parish church

- Flag Coat of arms
- Interactive map of El Rubio
- Coordinates: 37°21′N 4°59′W
- Country: Spain
- Province: Seville
- Municipality: El Rubio

Area
  - Total: 21 km^{2} (8.1 sq mi)
- Elevation: 209 m (686 ft)

Population (2025-01-01)
  - Total: 3,287
  - Density: 160/km^{2} (410/sq mi)
- Time zone: UTC+1 (CET)
  - Summer (DST): UTC+2 (CEST)

El Rubio is a town and municipality located in the province of Seville, Spain. According to the 2005 census (INE), the city has a population of 3584 inhabitants.

== See also ==
- List of municipalities in Seville
