= Álex Ortiz (footballer) =

Spanish footballer

Personal information
- Full name: Alejandro Ortiz Ramos
- Date of birth: 25 September 1985 (age 41)
- Place of birth: Seville, Spain
- Height: 1.81 m (5 ft 11 in)
- Position: Centre-back

Youth career
- Sevilla

Senior career*
| Years | Team | Apps | (Gls) |
| 2005–2006 | Sevilla B | 8 | (1) |
| 2005 | → Cerro Águila (loan) | | |
| 2006–2007 | Alcalá | 33 | (2) |
| 2007–2010 | Betis B | 97 | (9) |
| 2008 | Betis | 1 | (0) |
| 2010–2012 | Gimnàstic | 32 | (3) |
| 2012–2013 | Guadalajara | 33 | (1) |
| 2013–2014 | Alavés | 24 | (1) |
| 2014–2017 | Mirandés | 80 | (7) |
| 2017–2018 | Murcia | 14 | (0) |
| 2018–2021 | Utrera | 70 | (2) |
| Total | | 392 | (26) |
- * Club domestic league appearances and goals

Alejandro "Álex" Ortiz Ramos (born 25 September 1985) is a Spanish former professional footballer who played as a central defender.

== Club career ==
Born in Seville, Andalusia, Ortiz played reserve team football with both Sevilla FC and Real Betis. On 10 February 2008, whilst at the service of the latter club, he appeared in his only La Liga game, featuring the full 90 minutes in a 3–1 away loss against Valencia CF.

After being released by Betis in June 2010, Ortiz resumed his career in the Segunda División, successively representing Gimnàstic de Tarragona, CD Guadalajara, Deportivo Alavés and CD Mirandés. He scored his first goal as a professional on 17 March 2012 to help Gimnàstic defeat hosts FC Cartagena 3–1 after coming on as a 26th-minute substitute for Sergio Juste, but the season eventually ended in relegation.
