= 1947–48 Gimnàstic de Tarragona season =

Gimnàstic de Tarragona
1947–48 season
- Manager: Juan José Nogués
- La Liga: 7th
- Copa del Generalísimo: Round of 32
- Top goalscorer: Peralta (20)

The 1947–48 season was Gimnàstic de Tarragona's sixty-first season in the club's existence and the debut season in La Liga.

== Squad ==
Note: Flags indicate national team as defined under FIFA eligibility rules; some limited exceptions apply. Players may hold more than one non-FIFA nationality.

No.	Pos.	Nation	Player
—	GK	ESP	Eduardo Soro
—	GK	ESP	Augusto Torres
—	DF	ESP	José Cobo
—	DF	ESP	Alfonso Pedromo
—	DF	ESP	Juan Babot
—	DF	ESP	Manuel Corró
—	DF	ESP	Vicente Martínez
—	MF	ESP	Andrés Català

No.	Pos.	Nation	Player
—	MF	ESP	Juanete
—	MF	ESP	Arturo Conesa
—	MF	ESP	Domènec Balmanya
—	MF	PHI	Gregorio Amestoy
—	FW	ESP	Camilo Roig
—	FW	ESP	Gabriel Taltavull
—	FW	ESP	Francisco Peralta
—	FW	ESP	David Panadés

== League table ==
Pos	Team	Pld	W	D	L	GF	GA	GD	Pts
5	Sevilla	26	12	5	9	50	40	+10	29
6	Atlético Bilbao	26	12	4	10	56	44	+12	28
7	Gimnástico	26	10	4	12	49	55	−6	24 (Note: Gimnástico finished ahead of Español on overall goal difference.)
8	Español	26	9	6	11	39	47	−8	24
9	Oviedo	26	9	5	12	49	57	−8	23

Source: BDFútbol
Rules for classification: 1) points; 2) head-to-head points; 3) head-to-head goal difference; 4) goal difference; 5) number of goals scored.

== Matches ==
Game	Date	Opponents	Venue	Result	Scorers
1	21 September 1947	Sabadell FC	Away	2-2	Peralta (2)
2	28 September 1947	Real Madrid	Home	3-3	Peralta, Panadés (2)
3	5 October 1947	Barcelona	Away	1-1	Roig
4	12 October 1947	Celta Vigo	Home	2-2	Juanete (2)
5	26 October 1947	Real Sociedad	Away	3-1	Taltavull
6	2 November 1947	Sporting Gijón	Home	5-0	Roig, Peralta (3), Juanete
7	9 November 1947	Sevilla	Away	3-1	Peralta
8	16 November 1947	Atlético Madrid	Home	2-1	Peralta, Aparicio (OG)
9	23 November 1947	Espanyol	Away	1-0	
10	30 November 1947	Valencia	Home	1-0	Taltavull
11	7 December 1947	Athletic Bilbao	Away	7-0	
12	14 December 1947	Real Oviedo	Home	3-0	Juanete (2), Penedo (OG)
13	21 December 1947	Alcoyano	Away	2-1	Juanete
14	4 January 1948	Sabadell	Home	0-1	
15	11 January 1948	Real Madrid	Away	1-3	Roig, Taltavull, Juanete
16	18 January 1948	Barcelona	Home	1-2	Roig
17	25 January 1948	Celta Vigo	Away	5-0	
18	1 February 1948	Real Sociedad	Home	2-0	Perdomo, Peralta
19	8 February 1948	Sporting Gijón	Away	3-2	Roig, Peralta
20	15 February 1948	Sevilla	Home	2-0	Conesa, Juanete
21	22 February 1948	Atlético Madrid	Away	5-2	Taltavull, Peralta
22	29 February 1948	Espanyol	Home	1-0	Taltavull
23	7 March 1948	Valencia	Away	3-1	Morera (OG)
24	28 March 1948	Athletic Bilbao	Home	7-1	Peralta (3), Juanete, Panadés (3)
25	4 April 1948	Real Oviedo	Away	6-2	Peralta, Juanete
26	11 April 1948	Alcoyano	Home	4-3	Peralta (4)
