= Raúl Fuster =

Spanish footballer

Personal information
- Full name: Raúl Fuster Arnao
- Date of birth: 23 July 1985 (age 41)
- Place of birth: Elche, Spain
- Height: 1.77 m (5 ft 10 in)
- Position: Left-back

Youth career
- Elche

Senior career*
Years	Team	Apps	(Gls)
2004–2006	Elche B		
2006–2010	Elche	81	(0)
2006–2007	→ Villajoyosa (loan)	29	(0)
2010–2012	Gimnàstic	35	(1)
2012	Lugo	2	(0)
2013	Salamanca	18	(0)
2013–2016	Lleida Esportiu	84	(5)
2016	Ponferradina	14	(0)
2017–2018	Llagostera	46	(0)
2018–2019	Ontinyent	26	(0)
2019	Intercity	6	(1)
Total		341	(7)
- * Club domestic league appearances and goals

Raúl Fuster Arnao (born 23 July 1985) is a Spanish former professional footballer who played as a left-back.

He played 118 matches in the Segunda División over six seasons, in representation of three clubs.

== Club career ==
Born in Elche, Province of Alicante, Fuster made his senior debut with hometown's Elche CF's reserves, in the Tercera División. Following a loan to Valencian Community neighbours Villajoyosa CF he was promoted to the first team in 2007, quickly becoming a very important defensive unit.

Having contributed 27 games to Elche's sixth place in 2009–10, Fuster signed with another Segunda División side, Gimnàstic de Tarragona. After two seasons with them, suffering relegation in his second and during which he scored his only goal as a professional in a 4–2 away loss against Córdoba CF, he was released.

In the summer of 2012, Fuster joined fellow second-tier CD Lugo. In the following transfer window he switched to Segunda División B where he would spend the next six years, with UD Salamanca, Lleida Esportiu, SD Ponferradina, UE Llagostera and Ontinyent CF.

On 28 March 2019, after the club's dissolution, Fuster left Ontinyent. The following month, he joined amateurs CF Intercity.

Fuster announced his retirement in August 2019, aged 34.
