= Jordi Roca (footballer) =

Spanish footballer

Personal information
- Full name: Jordi Roca Grau
- Date of birth: 23 August 1989 (age 37)
- Place of birth: Premià de Mar, Spain
- Height: 1.80 m (5 ft 11 in)
- Position: Midfielder

Team information
- Current team: Inter d'Escaldes
- Number: 20

Youth career
- Barcelona

Senior career*
Years	Team	Apps	(Gls)
2007–2008	Rubí		
2008–2010	Blanes		
2010–2012	Pobla Mafumet		
2011	Gimnàstic	0	(0)
2012	Atlético Baleares	0	(0)
2012–2013	Terrassa	32	(4)
2013–2014	Pobla Mafumet	36	(1)
2014–2016	Morell	32	(5)
2016–2018	Vilanova	14	(0)
2018–2020	Ampolla	29	(6)
2020–	Inter d'Escaldes	14	(2)
- * Club domestic league appearances and goals as of 20 December 2020

Jordi Roca Grau (born 23 August 1989) is a Spanish footballer who plays for Andorran side Inter Club d'Escaldes as a midfielder.

== Club career ==
Born in Premià de Mar, Barcelona, Catalonia, Roca made his senior debuts with UE Rubí. In the 2010 summer he joined Gimnàstic de Tarragona, after a stint at CD Blanes; he was assigned to the farm team in Tercera División.

On 8 September 2011 Roca played his first match as a professional, starting in a 0–6 away loss against Valladolid, in that season's Copa del Rey. He would spend the vast majority of his spell with the reserves, however.

On 19 July 2012 Roca signed for Segunda División B club CD Atlético Baleares. In September, however, he rescinded his link, and joined Terrassa FC in the fourth division on 8 October.

On 15 July 2013 Roca returned to Pobla, and appeared regularly during the campaign. In July 2014, he moved to Primera Catalana side UE Morell.

Roca joined Inter Club d'Escaldes in Andorra on 1 February 2020, after representing local sides CF Vilanova and CF Ampolla.

== Honours ==
Inter d'Escaldes

- Primera Divisió: 2019–20
- Copa Constitució: 2020
