= Antonio Longás =

Spanish footballer

Personal information
- Full name: Antonio Longás Ferrer
- Date of birth: 24 August 1984 (age 42)
- Place of birth: Zaragoza, Spain
- Height: 1.74 m (5 ft 9 in)
- Position: Midfielder

Youth career
- 2000–2003: Zaragoza

Senior career*
Years	Team	Apps	(Gls)
2003–2006	Zaragoza B	87	(2)
2006–2009	Zaragoza	10	(0)
2007–2008	→ Tenerife (loan)	28	(1)
2008–2009	→ Barcelona B (loan)	35	(2)
2009–2011	Cartagena	73	(1)
2011–2012	Gimnàstic	39	(2)
2012–2013	Racing Santander	6	(0)
2013–2015	Sabadell	55	(1)
Total		333	(9)

International career
2006	Aragon	1	(0)
- * Club domestic league appearances and goals

Antonio Longás Ferrer (born 24 August 1984) is a Spanish former professional footballer who played as a central midfielder.

He totalled 201 Segunda División matches over seven seasons (five goals), representing mainly Sabadell. In La Liga, he appeared for Zaragoza.

== Club career ==
Born in Zaragoza, Aragon, Longás was a youth product of Real Zaragoza's youth system and made his first-team debut on 17 September 2006 in a 2–0 home win against RCD Mallorca. He finished the season with ten La Liga appearances for his hometown club, mostly as a late substitute.

To gain more experience, Longás was loaned the following campaign to CD Tenerife in the Segunda División, and was regularly used at the Canary Islands side, scoring in a 2–2 home draw with Albacete Balompié. In August 2008, he was loaned once again, now to FC Barcelona Atlètic, coached by former Spain international Luis Enrique and just promoted to Segunda División B.

In late July 2009, Longás was released by Zaragoza and joined FC Cartagena, recently returned to division two. He continued playing in that tier the following seasons, with Gimnàstic de Tarragona, Racing de Santander and CE Sabadell FC.
