= Samuel Galindo =

Bolivian footballer (born 1992)

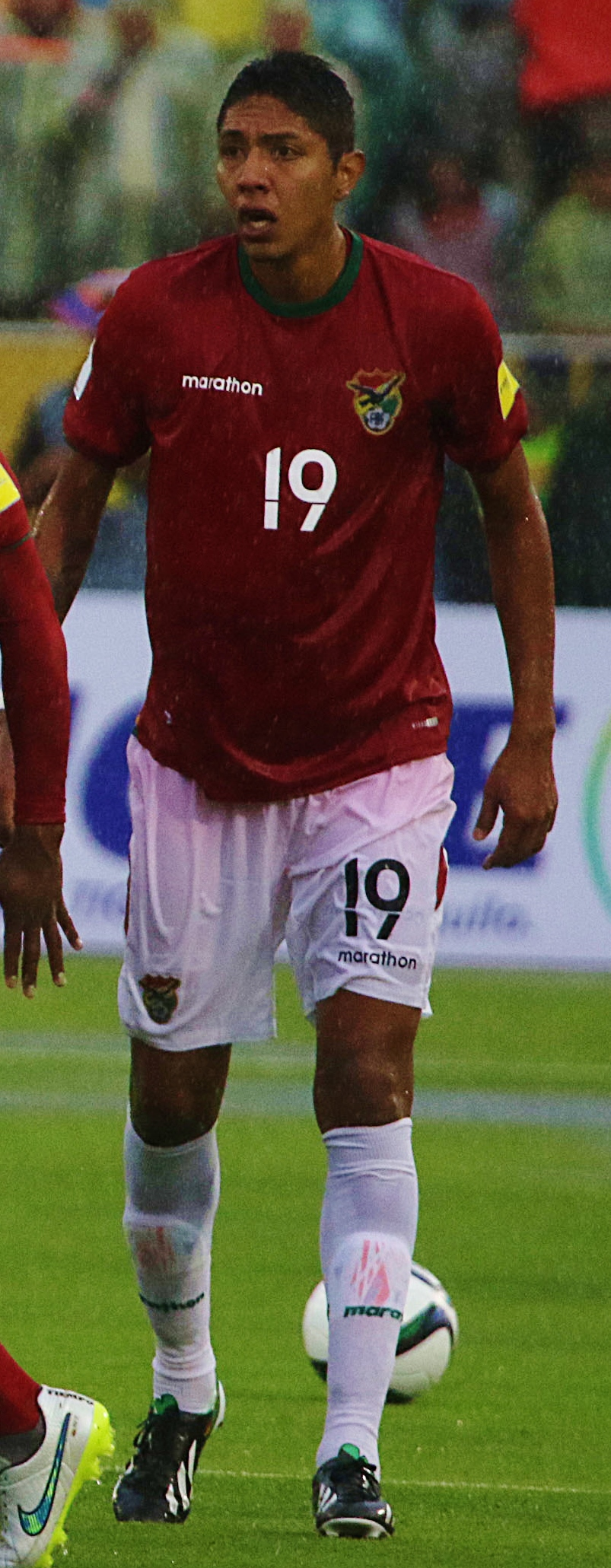
- Galindo with Bolivia in 2015

Personal information
- Full name: Samuel Galindo Suheiro
- Date of birth: 18 April 1992 (age 34)
- Place of birth: Santa Cruz, Bolivia
- Height: 1.90 m (6 ft 3 in)
- Position: Attacking midfielder

Team information
- Current team: GV San José
- Number: 10

Youth career
- 2009–2010: Real America

Senior career*
| Years | Team | Apps | (Gls) |
| 2010–2015 | Arsenal | 0 | (0) |
| 2010–2011 | → Salamanca (loan) | 7 | (0) |
| 2011–2012 | → Gimnàstic (loan) | 12 | (0) |
| 2012–2013 | → Lugo (loan) | 5 | (0) |
| 2013 | → Jorge Wilstermann (loan) | 7 | (0) |
| 2014 | → Oriente Petrolero (loan) | 0 | (0) |
| 2015 | → Portuguesa (loan) | 0 | (0) |
| 2015 | → Sport Boys Warnes (loan) | 0 | (0) |
| 2015–2016 | Petrolero | 35 | (3) |
| 2016–2017 | Sport Boys | 31 | (2) |
| 2017–2018 | The Strongest | 5 | (0) |
| 2018 | → San José (loan) | 15 | (1) |
| 2018–2021 | Always Ready | 88 | (13) |
| 2022 | Tomayapo | 15 | (0) |
| 2022 | Always Ready | 20 | (1) |
| 2023 | Tomayapo | 22 | (1) |
| 2024 | Nacional Potosí | 23 | (0) |
| 2025– | GV San José | 25 | (3) |

International career^{‡}
| 2009 | Bolivia U17 | 7 | (1) |
| 2009–2011 | Bolivia U20 | 4 | (0) |
| 2010– | Bolivia | 4 | (0) |
- * Club domestic league appearances and goals as of 30 December 2025 ‡ National team caps and goals as of 16:56, 30 May 2021 (UTC)

Samuel Galindo Suheiro (born 18 April 1992 in Santa Cruz) is a Bolivian footballer who plays for GV San José as an attacking midfielder.

== Club career ==
Galindo was signed by Arsenal in January 2010, from Bolivian club Real America. He was loaned to UD Salamanca at the start of the 2010–11 season.

For the 2011–12 season, Galindo was loaned to another Spanish club. This time, to Gimnàstic de Tarragona.

For the 2012–13 season, Galindo sealed his third loan spell in three consecutive seasons with CD Lugo, in the Spanish second division. He only appeared in 5 games for the club, which prompted him to move back to Arsenal earlier than expected.

After the unsuccessful spell with Lugo, he moved back to Bolivia to play for Club Jorge Wilstermann. During his time at Club Jorge Wilstermann, he played seven games, he didn't score nor assist during that time.

Galindo was not loaned out in the 2013–14 season and played no football for the U21 team in the first half of the season as he did not have a work permit. He joined Colorado Rapids on trial in January 2014.

On 9 January 2015, Galindo joined Brazilian club Portuguesa. On 23 January, however, he was recalled by Arsenal, who decided to cancel his loan to Lusa.

== International career ==
Galindo represented Bolivia for the first time in an international friendly against Mexico in February 2010. He has also served as captain of Bolivia's Under 20 team and Under 17 team. He has since played against Panama in a 1–3 friendly defeat.
