= Juan Millán =

Spanish footballer

Personal information
- Full name: Juan Millán Rubio
- Date of birth: 22 January 1994 (age 32)
- Place of birth: Barcelona, Spain
- Height: 1.90 m (6 ft 3 in)
- Position: Forward

Youth career
- Roda Barà
- 2011–2013: Gimnàstic

Senior career*
Years	Team	Apps	(Gls)
2012	Gimnàstic	7	(0)
2013–2016	Roda Barà		
- * Club domestic league appearances and goals

Juan Millán Rubio (born 22 January 1994) is a Spanish retired footballer who played as a forward.

== Club career ==
Born in Barcelona, Catalonia, after a brief period with CA Roda de Barà, Millán joined Gimnàstic de Tarragona's youth ranks. In March 2012, he and Eugeni were called up to train with the first team.

Millán made his first team debut on 17 March 2012, starting in a 3–1 away win against FC Cartagena in the Segunda División. In the 2013 summer, Millán returned to Roda de Barà, playing for the side in the Segona Catalana.
