= Alfons Serra =

Spanish footballer

Personal information
- Full name: Alfons Serra Fabra
- Date of birth: 10 December 1990 (age 35)
- Place of birth: Valls, Spain
- Height: 1.75 m (5 ft 9 in)
- Position: Attacking midfielder

Team information
- Current team: Europa
- Number: 12

Youth career
- Gimnàstic

Senior career*
Years	Team	Apps	(Gls)
2010–2013	Pobla Mafumet	117	(8)
2011	Gimnàstic	0	(0)
2013–2014	Constància	27	(0)
2014–2016	Pobla Mafumet	68	(3)
2016	Cornellà	0	(0)
2016–2017	Pobla Mafumet	6	(0)
2017	Mons Calpe	4	(1)
2017–2018	Ceuta	11	(0)
2018	Arandina	11	(0)
2018–	Europa	61	(12)
- * Club domestic league appearances and goals as of 15 November 2020

Alfons Serra Fabra (born 10 December 1990) is a Spanish footballer who plays for CE Europa as an attacking midfielder.

== Club career ==
Born in Valls, Tarragona, Catalonia, Serra graduated in Gimnàstic de Tarragona's youth system. After several seasons with the farm team, he made his professional debut on 8 September 2011, in a 6–0 loss away to Valladolid in that season's Copa del Rey.

In August 2013, Serra signed a contract with CE Constància. After featuring regularly, he returned to Pobla in August of the following year.
