= Xisco Campos =

Spanish footballer (born 1982)

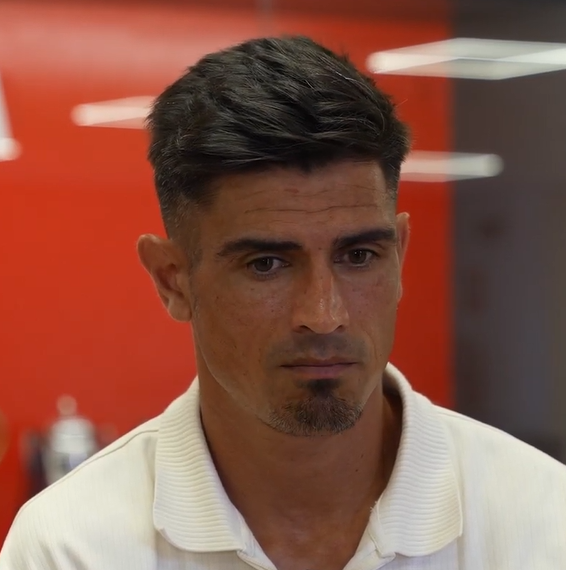
- Campos in 2026

Personal information
- Full name: Francisco Javier Campos Coll
- Date of birth: 10 March 1982 (age 44)
- Place of birth: Binissalem, Spain
- Height: 1.80 m (5 ft 11 in)
- Position: Defender

Team information
- Current team: Gimnàstic (manager)

Youth career
- Mallorca

Senior career*
Years	Team	Apps	(Gls)
2001–2005	Mallorca B	111	(0)
2004–2005	Mallorca	2	(0)
2005–2007	Levante B	43	(0)
2007–2008	Écija	37	(1)
2008–2010	Murcia	33	(0)
2009–2010	→ Castellón (loan)	35	(1)
2010–2016	Gimnàstic	195	(7)
2016–2017	Ponferradina	36	(0)
2017–2020	Mallorca	67	(1)
2020–2021	Pontevedra	25	(1)
2021–2022	Zamora	18	(0)
Total		602	(11)

Managerial career
- 2022–2024: Mallorca B (assistant)
- 2024–2026: Mallorca (assistant)
- 2026–: Gimnàstic
- * Club domestic league appearances and goals

Francisco Javier Campos Coll (born 10 March 1982), known as Xisco Campos, is a Spanish former professional footballer who played as a central defender or a right-back. He is currently manager of Primera Federación club Gimnàstic de Tarragona.

He spent most of his career with Gimnàstic, appearing in more than 200 competitive matches over six seasons, three spent in the Segunda División. He played 11 La Liga games with Mallorca in two separate spells.

== Playing career ==
Born in Binissalem, Balearic Islands and a product of local RCD Mallorca's youth academy, Campos appeared twice for the first team in late 2004/early 2005, both as a substitute and at home, against Atlético Madrid (1–1) and Deportivo de La Coruña (2–2). He subsequently represented Levante UD B, Écija Balompié, Real Murcia CF and CD Castellón, the last two clubs in the Segunda División.

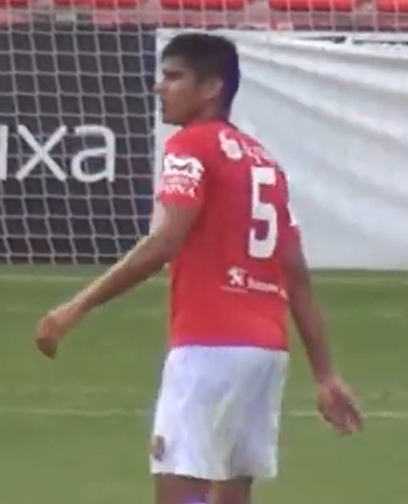
Campos playing for Gimnàstic in 2013

In the summer of 2010, Campos signed with Gimnàstic de Tarragona also of the second tier. After being relegated at the end of the 2011–12 season he renewed his contract with the Catalans for another year, and was also appointed team captain.

Campos made his 100th league appearance for Nàstic on 8 September 2013, in a 1–0 home win over RCD Espanyol B. On 11 July 2016, after falling down the pecking order, the 34-year-old moved to SD Ponferradina.

On 29 June 2017, Campos became a free agent and returned to Mallorca after 12 years away. He was part of their teams that earned two consecutive promotions to reach La Liga at the end of the 2018–19 campaign.

Xisco played 11 matches in 2019–20 – nine in the league, two in the Copa del Rey – in an immediate relegation. He was subsequently released, and joined Segunda División B side Pontevedra CF.

On 23 June 2021, Campos signed for Zamora CF in the newly-created Primera División RFEF. In June 2022, having suffered relegation, he announced his retirement at the age of 40.

== Coaching career ==
Immediately after retiring, Campos returned to his first club Mallorca as assistant to the reserves. In July 2024, he became part of Jagoba Arrasate's staff in the main squad, but was moved to an analyst role in February 2026 following the latter's dismissal.

On 10 June 2026, Campos returned to Gimnàstic as head coach of the first team; he signed a two-year contract.
