= César Diop =

Senegalese footballer

Personal information
- Full name: César Diop
- Date of birth: 10 November 1983 (age 43)
- Place of birth: Thiès, Senegal
- Height: 1.87 m (6 ft 2 in)
- Position: Defensive midfielder

Team information
- Current team: Carnoux FC

Youth career
- Dakar UC

Senior career*
Years	Team	Apps	(Gls)
2000–2001	Police Dakar		
2001–2006	Amiens B		
2006–2008	Gap	58	(0)
2008–2009	Cassis Carnoux	24	(0)
2009–2010	Gimnàstic	25	(0)
2010–2011	Lorca Atlético	9	(0)
2011–2012	Atlético Baleares	33	(2)
2012	Oviedo	0	(0)
2012–2013	Feurs	7	(1)
2013–2016	ES Pennoise	31	(2)
2016–	Carnoux FC		
- * Club domestic league appearances and goals as of 1 July 2014

César Diop (born November 10, 1983, in Thiès) is a Senegalese footballer who plays for Carnoux FC in France, as a defensive midfielder.

== Club career ==
Diop started his professional career in Senegal for ASC Police Dakar, where he played one professional season. he played for Amiens SC youth club. In July 2006, he moved to French fourth division team Gap FC. He spent two seasons at the club.

In the start of the 2008–09 season, he signed with French third level club SO Cassis Carnoux. He played 25 matches for SO Cassis Carnoux, but did not score a goal.

On 27 July 2009, Diop moved to Spain and signed with Gimnàstic de Tarragona, in the Segunda División. He was announced as one of eight signings for the 2009–10 season.

In his first season with the Catalans. His contract was not renewed at the end of the season and he being released from Nàstic.

After being released in July, Diop became a free agent and stay in this condition until January 2011, when he signed with new founded club Lorca Atlético CF. Six months later, he signed with CD Atlético Baleares.
