= David Valle =

Spanish footballer

Personal information
- Full name: David Valle Millán
- Date of birth: 27 May 1978 (age 48)
- Place of birth: Barcelona, Spain
- Height: 1.90 m (6 ft 3 in)
- Position: Goalkeeper

Youth career
- Gramenet

Senior career*
Years	Team	Apps	(Gls)
1997–1998	Gramenet B		
1998–2004	Gramenet	63	(0)
2000	→ Cornellà (loan)		
2004–2005	Terrassa	7	(0)
2005–2006	Hércules	0	(0)
2006–2009	Córdoba	80	(0)
2009–2010	Poli Ejido	29	(0)
2010–2011	Badalona	41	(0)
2011–2012	Gimnàstic	0	(0)
2012–2014	San Fernando	66	(0)
Total		286	(0)
- * Club domestic league appearances and goals

David Valle Millán (born 27 May 1978 in Barcelona, Catalonia) is a Spanish former footballer who played as a goalkeeper, and the current goalkeeping coach of Extremadura UD.
