= José Ángel Bueno =

Spanish footballer

Personal information
- Full name: José Ángel Bueno Ortega
- Date of birth: 7 February 1991 (age 35)
- Place of birth: Tarragona, Spain
- Height: 1.75 m (5 ft 9 in)
- Position: Attacking midfielder

Youth career
- Gimnàstic

Senior career*
| Years | Team | Apps | (Gls) |
| 2010–2014 | Pobla Mafumet | 81 | (8) |
| 2011 | Gimnàstic | 5 | (0) |
| 2014–2015 | Hospitalet | 25 | (0) |
| 2015–2016 | Vilafranca | 24 | (1) |
| 2016–2017 | Vila-seca | ? | (5) |
| 2017–2018 | La Cava | 7 | (0) |
- * Club domestic league appearances and goals as of 4 June 2016

José Ángel Bueno Ortega (born 7 February 1991) is a Spanish footballer who plays as an attacking midfielder.

== Club career ==
Born in Tarragona, Catalonia, Bueno was a product of Gimnàstic de Tarragona's youth categories. He finished his graduation in July 2010, and was immediately moved to farm team in the fourth division. However, he missed the first half of his debut campaign due to injury, only returning to the fields in March 2011.

Bueno made his debut with the first team on 4 September, coming on as a late substitute in a 0–0 away draw against CD Numancia in the second level championship. He finished the season with 5 appearances (193 minutes overall), with Nàstic being relegated.

On 30 July 2012, in a friendly match against RCD Espanyol, Bueno broke his fibula after a tackle from Wakaso Mubarak, being sidelined for four months. He continued to appear regularly with the reserves after his recovery.

On 12 July 2014, Bueno moved to neighbouring CE L'Hospitalet, in the third division. He moved to fourth tier side FC Vilafranca in 2015, where he featured regularly.

After leaving Vilafranca, Bueno represented CF Vila-seca in the Primera Catalana (fifth tier) and CD La Cava in Segona Catalana (sixth tier).
