= Dani Carril =

Spanish footballer

Personal information
- Full name: Daniel Carril Freire
- Date of birth: 28 July 1980 (age 46)
- Place of birth: Vigo, Spain
- Height: 1.82 m (5 ft 11 1/2 in)
- Position: Left-back

Youth career
- Celta

Senior career*
Years	Team	Apps	(Gls)
1998–2001	Celta B		
2001–2002	Grove		
2002–2003	Rápido Bouzas		
2003–2004	Grove		
2004–2005	Rápido Bouzas	34	(2)
2005–2008	Lugo	84	(15)
2008–2009	Hércules	10	(1)
2009–2010	Levante	14	(1)
2010–2011	Las Palmas	8	(1)
2011–2012	Ponferradina	17	(0)
2015–2020	Santa Mariña	74	(46)
- * Club domestic league appearances and goals

Daniel 'Dani' Carril Freire (born 28 July 1980) is a Spanish former footballer who played as a left-back.

== Club career ==
Carril was born in Vigo, Province of Pontevedra, Galicia. He was brought up at local RC Celta de Vigo, but never received any playing time with its main squad, signing with amateurs Club Deportivo Grove (regional leagues) in 2001 and joining Tercera División club CD Lugo four years later.

After being instrumental in helping Lugo to a Segunda División B promotion in 2006, Carril eventually moved to the Segunda División with Hércules CF. In his only season, he featured rarely as the team fell just three points short of a La Liga return, being mainly restricted to matches in the Copa del Rey; he scored his first second-division goal on 26 October 2008, in a 3–0 home win against Deportivo Alavés which also marked his debut.

In July 2009, Carril joined another side in the second tier, Levante UD, agreeing to a two-year contract with the Valencians. He changed clubs again only one year later, however, signing with UD Las Palmas in the same level.
