= Mikel Orbegozo =

Spanish footballer (born 1989)

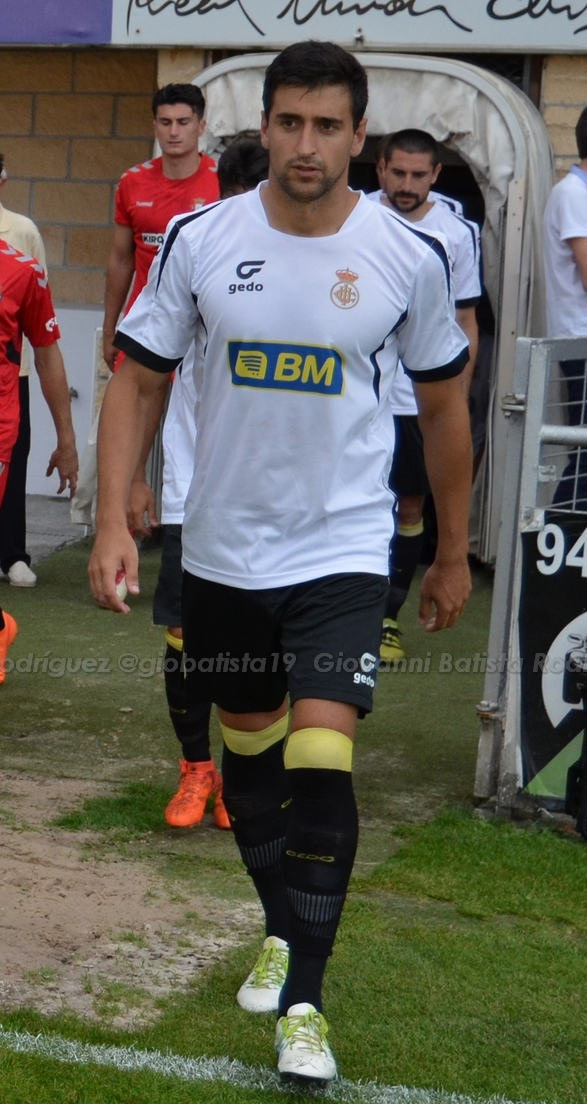
- Orbegozo with Real Unión in 2018

Personal information
- Full name: Mikel Orbegozo Orbegozo
- Date of birth: 15 April 1989 (age 37)
- Place of birth: San Sebastián, Spain
- Height: 1.83 m (6 ft 0 in)
- Position: Striker

Team information
- Current team: Beasain

Youth career
- 2000–2008: Real Sociedad

Senior career*
Years	Team	Apps	(Gls)
2007–2011	Real Sociedad B	83	(29)
2011–2014	Bilbao Athletic	14	(4)
2012	→ Gimnàstic (loan)	11	(0)
2012–2013	→ Sestao (loan)	22	(3)
2013–2014	→ Amorebieta (loan)	37	(11)
2014–2015	Getafe B	37	(16)
2015–2016	Compostela	20	(3)
2016	Marbella	5	(0)
2016–2017	Jaén	19	(2)
2017	Ebro	12	(4)
2017–2020	Real Unión	64	(24)
2020–2021	Tudelano	20	(6)
2021–	Beasain	29	(13)
- * Club domestic league appearances and goals as of 20:20, 19 May 2022 (UTC)

Mikel Orbegozo Orbegozo (born 15 April 1989) is a Spanish footballer who plays for SD Beasain as a striker.

== Club career ==
Born in San Sebastián, Gipuzkoa, Orbegozo began his career with hometown club Real Sociedad, playing four seasons with the reserves. In 2009–10, he scored a career-best 26 goals as the Basques returned to the Segunda División B after one year out.

On 2 July 2011, free agent Orbegozo signed a contract with neighbouring Athletic Bilbao running until 2014. He was immediately assigned to the B side, also in the third tier.

Orbegozo was loaned to Gimnàstic de Tarragona of Segunda División in early January 2012, on a six-month deal. He made his league debut on the 13th, in a 1–0 away loss against Celta de Vigo.

After subsequently serving loan stints at Sestao River Club and SD Amorebieta (both in his native Basque Country), Orbegozo was released by the Lions on 26 May 2014. On 15 June he joined another reserve team, Getafe CF B.

== Personal life ==
Orbegozo's older brother, Jon, was also a footballer and a forward. He played and scored regularly (over 200 games, over 50 goals) in the third division with SD Lemona, Barakaldo CF and Amorebieta, but never featured in the professional divisions. Although they were opponents on several occasions, the siblings did not play together as seniors; Jon replaced Mikel in Amorebieta's squad in the summer of 2014.
