= Diego Jiménez (footballer, born 1979) =

Spanish footballer

Personal information
- Full name: Diego David Jiménez Martínez
- Date of birth: 29 May 1979 (age 47)
- Place of birth: Alcoy, Spain
- Height: 1.79 m (5 ft 10 in)
- Position: Midfielder

Youth career
- Elche
- Alcoyano

Senior career*
Years	Team	Apps	(Gls)
1998–2000	Alcoyano		
2000–2001	Alzira	29	(1)
2001–2002	Alcoyano		
2002–2003	Alicante	0	(0)
2002–2003	→ Villajoyosa (loan)		
2003–2004	Villajoyosa	22	(0)
2004–2005	Sangonera		
2005–2006	Dénia		
2006–2012	Alcoyano	197	(10)
2012–2014	Eibar	50	(3)
2014–2015	Olímpic Xàtiva	30	(2)
2016	Muro	6	(0)
2016–2017	Atzeneta	31	(2)
2017	Yeclano		
2017	Castellonense	5	(0)
- * Club domestic league appearances and goals

Diego David Jiménez Martínez (born 29 May 1979) is a Spanish former footballer who played as a midfielder.
