= Joan Sabaté =

Spanish footballer

Personal information
- Full name: Joan Sabaté Borràs
- Date of birth: 26 March 1993 (age 33)
- Place of birth: Pinell de Brai, Spain
- Height: 1.69 m (5 ft 7 in)
- Position: Midfielder

Youth career
- Gimnàstic

Senior career*
Years	Team	Apps	(Gls)
2012	Gimnàstic	1	(0)
2012–2014	Pobla Mafumet	16	(0)
2014	→ Torredembarra (loan)	17	(2)
2014–2015	Reddis	34	(2)
2015–2016	Amposta	22	(3)
2016–2017	Vilaseca		
2017–2019	Rapitenca	52	(22)
2019–2020	Tortosa	11	(2)
2020–2021	El Perelló	2	(0)
- * Club domestic league appearances and goals as of 11 October 2020

Joan Sabaté Borràs (born 26 March 1993) is a Spanish footballer who plays as a midfielder.

== Club career ==
Born in El Pinell de Brai, Tarragona, Catalonia, Sabaté was a product of Gimnàstic de Tarragona's youth categories. He made his first-team debut on 3 June 2012, starting in a 0–1 loss against Elche CF in the Segunda División, and was later assigned to the club's farm team in Tercera División.

On 11 January 2014, Sabaté was loaned to UD Torredembarra. He returned to Pobla in June, being subsequently released, and joined CF Reddis shortly after.
