= Ciutat de Tarragona Trophy =

Annual football tournament

Ciutat de Tarragona Trophy is a football (soccer) tournament played annually in Tarragona (province of Tarragona, Catalonia, Spain).

The tournament started in 2007.

== Ciutat de Tarragona Trophy ==
Year	Winners	Runners up	Score
2007	(Spain) Athletic Club	(Spain) Gimnàstic	2–0
2008	(Spain) Gimnàstic	(Netherlands) Vitesse Arnhem	3–0
2009	(Spain) Villarreal	(Spain) Gimnàstic	3–0
2010	(Spain) Espanyol	(Spain) Gimnàstic	1–1
2011	(Spain) UD Las Palmas	(Spain) Gimnàstic	1–1
2012	(Spain) Gimnàstic	(Spain) Villarreal	1–0
2013	(Spain) Real Zaragoza	(Spain) Gimnàstic	2–0
2016	(Spain) Real Zaragoza	(Spain) Gimnàstic	0–0
2017	(Spain) Gimnàstic	(Spain) Real Zaragoza	2–1
2018	(Spain) Gimnàstic	(Spain) Real Zaragoza	1–0
