= Xabi Pascual =

Spanish footballer

Personal information
- Full name: Carlos Xabier Pascual Luca de Tena
- Date of birth: 9 July 1981 (age 45)
- Place of birth: Bilbao, Spain
- Height: 1.91 m (6 ft 3 in)
- Position: Goalkeeper

Senior career*
Years	Team	Apps	(Gls)
2000–2002	Basconia		
2002–2003	Arenas Getxo		
2003–2004	Osasuna B	15	(0)
2004	Amurrio	15	(0)
2005	Racing Santander	0	(0)
2005–2006	Oviedo	0	(0)
2006–2007	Racing B	10	(0)
2007–2008	Barakaldo	16	(0)
2008–2010	Gimnàstic	3	(0)
2012	General Rojo		
2012–2013	Sacachispas		
2013–2015	Excursionistas		
2015–2016	Deportivo Español	5	(0)
- * Club domestic league appearances and goals

Carlos Xabier 'Xabi' Pascual Luca de Tena (born 9 July 1981) is a Spanish former footballer who played as a goalkeeper.

== Football career ==
Pascual was born in Bilbao, Biscay. During his career, spent almost exclusively in the lower leagues, he represented CD Basconia (Athletic Bilbao's third team), Arenas Club de Getxo, CA Osasuna B, Amurrio Club, Racing de Santander – no competitive appearances for the La Liga club, playing exclusively for the B-team – Real Oviedo, Barakaldo CF and Gimnàstic de Tarragona.

Pascual made his debut at the professional level on 14 June 2009, one month shy of his 28th birthday, keeping a clean sheet for Gimnàstic in a 2–0 home win against Elche CF in the Segunda División. He appeared in only two more matches in that level during his career, also with the Catalans.

In 2012, after two years without a club, Pascual moved to Argentina, going on to spend several seasons in the country's lower divisions.
