= Juan García (basketball) =

Cuban basketball player (1926–2003)

Personal information
- Nationality: Cuban
- Born: 2 July 1926
- Died: 24 December 2003 (aged 77)

Sport
- Sport: Basketball

Juan García (2 July 1926 – 24 December 2003) was a Cuban basketball player. He competed in the men's tournament at the 1948 Summer Olympics and the 1952 Summer Olympics.
