= Javi Bonilla =

Spanish footballer

Personal information
- Full name: Javier Bonilla Sevillano
- Date of birth: 25 October 1990 (age 36)
- Place of birth: Soria, Spain
- Height: 1.79 m (5 ft 10 1/2 in)
- Positions: Left back; winger

Team information
- Current team: Numancia
- Number: 3

Youth career
- Numancia

Senior career*
Years	Team	Apps	(Gls)
2009–2013	Numancia B	136	(14)
2011–2015	Numancia	35	(2)
2015	Aiginiakos	8	(0)
2015–2016	Leioa	33	(1)
2016–2017	Pontevedra	36	(7)
2017–2019	Mallorca	37	(3)
2019	Ibiza	15	(1)
2019–2023	Gimnàstic	114	(18)
2023–	Numancia	84	(9)
- * Club domestic league appearances and goals as of 7 May 2026

Javier "Javi" Bonilla Sevillano (born 25 October 1990) is a Spanish footballer who plays as either a left back or a left winger for Numancia.

== Club career ==
Born in Soria, Castile and León, Bonilla began his career with hometown club CD Numancia, making his senior debut with the reserves in the 2008–09 season. On 7 February 2011 he made his debut with the first team, in a 0–4 away defeat against RC Celta de Vigo in the Segunda División.

In his second appearance with the main squad, on 16 May 2012, Bonilla was handed a start, and scored the third goal in a 3–1 win at Hércules CF. On 27 January 2015, after featuring in only one competitive match during the campaign, he moved abroad and signed for Greek Football League side Aiginiakos FC, returning home on 27 August to SD Leioa of Segunda División B.

In his first and only season for the Basques, Bonilla scored in the first leg of their 5–2 aggregate win over CD Olímpic de Xàtiva in the relegation play-off. On 10 June 2016, he moved to fellow league team Pontevedra CF.

Bonilla continued competing in the third division in the following years, representing RCD Mallorca (where he achieved promotion in 2018), UD Ibiza and Gimnàstic de Tarragona.
