= Manuel Ruz =

Spanish footballer (born 1986)

Personal information
- Full name: Manuel Ruz Baños
- Date of birth: 5 April 1986 (age 40)
- Place of birth: Valencia, Spain
- Height: 1.69 m (5 ft 7 in)
- Position: Right back

Youth career
- Valencia

Senior career*
Years	Team	Apps	(Gls)
2004–2005	Valencia B	24	(0)
2005–2006	Valencia	3	(0)
2005–2006	→ Gimnàstic (loan)	37	(0)
2006–2007	Gimnàstic	17	(0)
2007–2008	Granada 74	30	(0)
2008–2010	Hércules	17	(0)
2010–2012	Gimnàstic	23	(0)
2012–2013	Xerez	7	(0)
Total		158	(0)

International career
2003	Spain U17	13	(0)
Medal record
Representing Spain
Men's football
FIFA U-17 World Cup
Runner-up	2003 Finland
UEFA European Under-17 Championship
Runner-up	2003 Portugal
- * Club domestic league appearances and goals

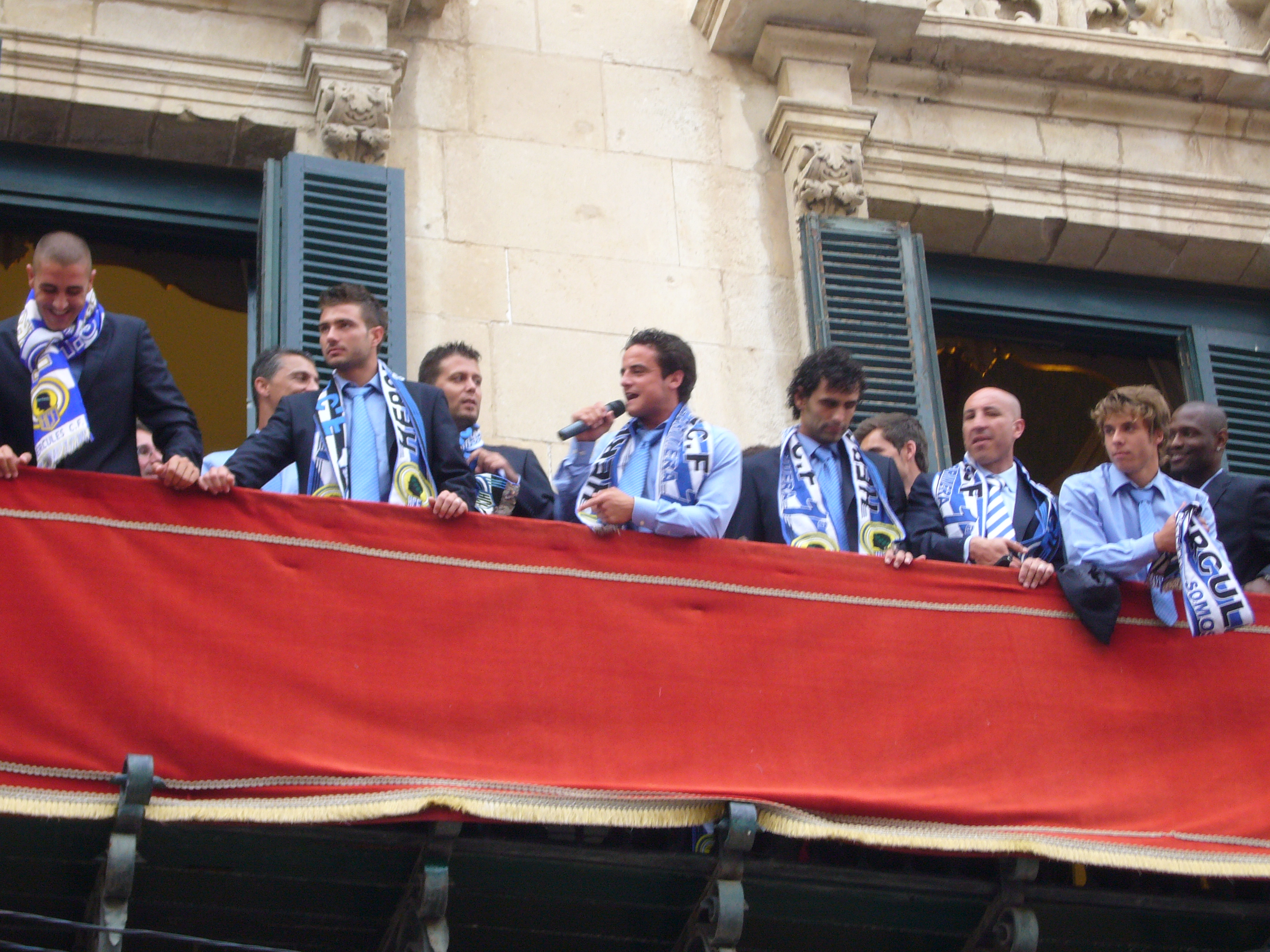
Ruz at the Alicante City Hall in 2010.JPG

Manuel Ruz Baños (born 5 April 1986) is a Spanish former professional footballer who played as a right back.

== Club career ==
A product of Valencia CF's youth ranks, Valencia-born Ruz managed to appear three times in La Liga with its first team, all during the 2004–05 season. He then moved for Gimnàstic de Tarragona and remained there for two years, the first on loan.

For 2007–08, Ruz joined newly formed Granada 74 CF. At the end of the campaign, with the club relegated, he stayed in Segunda División, signing with Hércules CF.

In November 2009, during the 1–0 win at UD Almería for the Copa del Rey (3–1 aggregate success), Ruz suffered a dangerous challenge from Guilherme which resulted in a severe knee injury. He was subsequently sidelined for the rest of the season.

On 2 September 2010, Ruz returned to Gimnàstic. After only one official appearance, he ruptured the ligaments and meniscus in his left knee during training, missing the vast majority of the second division campaign; his return to action only took place on 15 May 2011, when he played the full 90 minutes in a 3–1 home win against eventual champions Real Betis as his team eventually managed to escape relegation.

On 3 July 2012, after two seasons with Nàstic, suffering relegation in his second, Ruz was released. Ten days later he signed a contract with Xerez CD also in the second level, again featuring rarely due to physical problems, this time a pericardium condition.
