= Aitor Casas =

Spanish footballer

Personal information
- Full name: Aitor Casas Luceño
- Date of birth: 29 June 1992 (age 34)
- Place of birth: Reus, Spain
- Height: 1.84 m (6 ft 1/2 in)
- Position: Left back

Youth career
- Pare Manyanet
- Gimnàstic

Senior career*
Years	Team	Apps	(Gls)
2010	Gimnàstic	1	(0)
2010–2014	Pobla Mafumet	65	(1)
2014	Sabadell B	1	(0)
2014–2016	Vilafranca	28	(2)
Total		95	(3)
- * Club domestic league appearances and goals

Aitor Casas Luceño (born 29 June 1992) is a Spanish retired footballer who played as a left back.

== Club career ==
Born in Reus, Tarragona, Catalonia, Casas joined Gimnàstic de Tarragona's youth setup after a short stint with AE Pare Manyanet. On 19 June 2010, while still a junior, he played his first match as a professional, coming on as a late substitute in a 0–1 loss at Las Palmas in the Segunda División championship. It was his maiden appearance in the competition, however.

In the 2010 summer, Casas was assigned to CF Pobla de Mafumet, the club's farm team. On 29 January 2014, he left Nàstic, and joined CE Sabadell FC's reserves on 12 February. However, a week later he left the club, alleging "personal problems".

On 23 June 2014, Casas signed for FC Vilafranca, in Tercera División. He left the club in 2016, and subsequently retired from professional football.
