= Eugeni Valderrama =

Spanish footballer

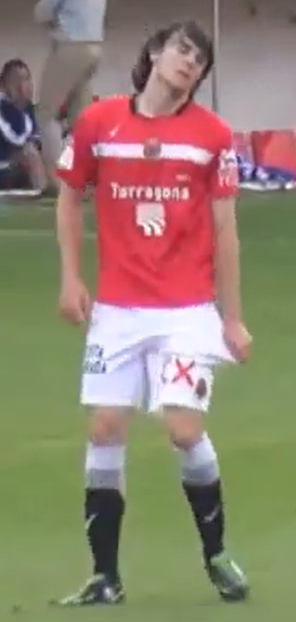
- Eugeni playing for Gimnàstic in 2013

Personal information
- Full name: Eugeni Valderrama Domènech
- Date of birth: 19 July 1994 (age 32)
- Place of birth: Tarragona, Spain
- Height: 1.82 m (6 ft 0 in)
- Position: Central midfielder

Team information
- Current team: Gimnàstic

Youth career
- 2006–2011: Barcelona
- 2011–2012: Gimnàstic

Senior career*
| Years | Team | Apps | (Gls) |
| 2012–2013 | Gimnàstic | 29 | (1) |
| 2013–2015 | Sevilla B | 23 | (0) |
| 2014–2015 | → Lleida Esportiu (loan) | 18 | (1) |
| 2015–2016 | Badalona | 35 | (7) |
| 2016–2018 | Valencia B | 33 | (5) |
| 2017–2018 | → Lorca (loan) | 12 | (2) |
| 2018 | → Cádiz (loan) | 13 | (1) |
| 2018–2021 | Huesca | 38 | (3) |
| 2018–2019 | → Albacete (loan) | 33 | (8) |
| 2021–2022 | Arouca | 11 | (0) |
| 2022–2023 | Zaragoza | 37 | (1) |
| 2023–2025 | Ibiza | 71 | (6) |
| 2025–2026 | Marbella | 31 | (4) |
| 2026– | Gimnàstic | 0 | (0) |
- * Club domestic league appearances and goals as of 10 June 2026

Eugeni Valderrama Domènech (born 19 July 1994), simply known as Eugeni, is a Spanish professional footballer who plays as a central midfielder for Gimnàstic de Tarragona.

== Club career ==
Born in Tarragona, Catalonia, Eugeni played with FC Barcelona from ages 12 to 17. In the 2011 summer he returned to his hometown, finishing his formation with Gimnàstic de Tarragona.

Eugeni made his senior debut on 22 February 2012, against AD Torreforta for the Copa Catalunya. In March, he and Juan Millán were called up to train with the first team.

Eugeni made his first Segunda División appearance on 21 April 2012, appearing as a late substitute in a 1–0 away loss against CD Guadalajara. He made his first start on 3 June against Elche CF, playing the full 90 minutes as the match ended with the same score.

On 10 July 2012, Eugeni was promoted to the main squad, with Nàstic now in Segunda División B. On 3 March 2013 he scored his first professional goal, the last in a 4–1 home success over RCD Mallorca B.

On 25 June 2013, Eugeni signed a three-year deal with Sevilla FC, being assigned to the reserves also in the third level. On 18 July 2015, after a loan stint at Lleida Esportiu, he moved to CF Badalona.

On 9 June 2016, Eugeni signed for another reserve team, Valencia CF Mestalla. On 8 August of the following year, he was loaned to Lorca FC in the second division, for one year.

Eugeni made his debut for Lorca on 18 August 2017, scoring the first through an olympic goal in a 2–0 home win against Cultural y Deportiva Leonesa; it was also his first professional goal. The following 9 January, he moved to fellow league team Cádiz CF also in a temporary deal.

On 5 July 2018, Eugeni agreed to a three-year deal with La Liga side SD Huesca, but was loaned to Albacete Balompié in the second division for one year on 1 August. Upon returning, he was a regular starter for the Aragonese side which achieved promotion back to the top tier.

Eugeni made his debut in the main category of Spanish football on 13 September 2020, as he replaced David Ferreiro in a 1–1 away draw against Villarreal CF. The following 23 June, after suffering relegation, he moved abroad and signed a three-year contract with Portuguese Primeira Liga side F.C. Arouca.

On 26 January 2022, Eugeni terminated his contract with Arouca, and signed a two-and-a-half-year deal with Real Zaragoza back in his home country the following day. On 20 July 2023, he agreed to terminate his link with the latter club, and moved to Primera Federación side UD Ibiza the following day.

On 1 July 2024, Eugeni agreed to a new one-year deal with Ibiza, but left the following June, and signed for Marbella FC also in division three on 9 July 2025. On 11 June 2026, he agreed to return to his first club Nàstic on a two-year contract.
