= Rodri (footballer, born 1979) =

Spanish footballer

Personal information
- Full name: Rodrigo Gimeno Molina
- Date of birth: 21 September 1979 (age 47)
- Place of birth: Valencia, Spain
- Height: 1.80 m (5 ft 11 in)
- Position: Midfielder

Youth career
- Albacete

Senior career*
Years	Team	Apps	(Gls)
1997–2001	Albacete B		
2000–2003	Albacete	17	(0)
2003–2007	Castellón	143	(9)
2007–2010	Hércules	79	(1)
2010–2013	Gimnàstic	64	(4)
- * Club domestic league appearances and goals

Rodrigo Gimeno Molina (born 21 September 1979), commonly known as Rodri, is a Spanish retired footballer who played mainly as a defensive midfielder.

He amassed Segunda División totals of 215 matches and seven goals over one full decade, representing four clubs.

== Football career ==
Born in Valencia, Rodri started professionally with Albacete Balompié, but appeared very rarely with the first team, leaving precisely when they returned to La Liga in 2003 after a seven-year absence, to which he contributed by appearing in only six second division games.

Rodri subsequently established at CD Castellón, helping the club promote from the third level in his second year. Starting in 2007–08, he played three seasons with Hércules CF in division two.

On 18 August 2010, after helping the Alicante side return to the top flight after a 13-year absence – 17 matches, but only six complete – Rodri moved to Gimnàstic de Tarragona in the second tier. In January 2013, aged 33, he terminated his contract with the Catalans.
