= Vicente Pérez (footballer) =

Spanish footballer

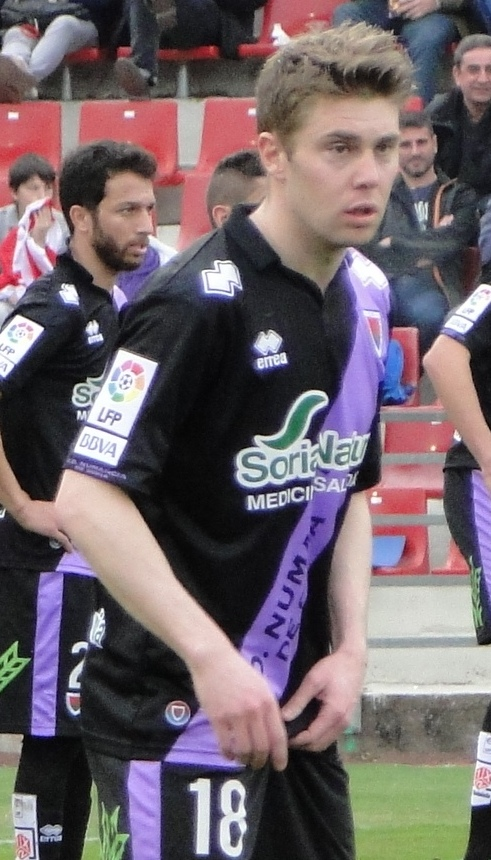
- Pérez with Numancia in 2015

Personal information
- Full name: Vicente Pérez Madrid
- Date of birth: 11 July 1986 (age 40)
- Place of birth: Aspe, Spain
- Height: 1.80 m (5 ft 11 in)
- Position: Midfielder

Youth career
- Aspe
- Hércules
- 2001–2002: Valencia
- 2002–2003: Hércules

Senior career*
Years	Team	Apps	(Gls)
2003–2006	Hércules	9	(0)
2005–2006	→ Valencia B (loan)		
2006–2009	Granada	103	(18)
2009–2011	Gimnàstic	25	(1)
2011–2012	Leganés	35	(4)
2012–2013	Guadalajara	39	(6)
2013–2016	Numancia	93	(6)
2016–2017	UCAM Murcia	33	(0)
2018	Fuenlabrada	16	(2)
2018–2019	Alcoyano	32	(2)
2019–2021	Novelda	20	(0)
- * Club domestic league appearances and goals

Vicente Pérez Madrid (born 11 July 1986) is a Spanish former footballer who played as a midfielder.
