= Fran Vélez =

Spanish footballer

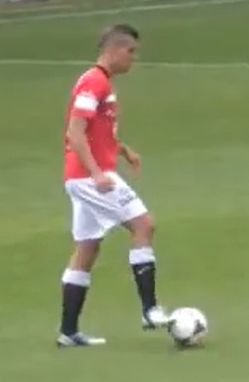
- Vélez playing for Gimnàstic in 2013

Personal information
- Full name: Francisco Manuel Vélez Jiménez
- Date of birth: 23 June 1991 (age 35)
- Place of birth: Tarragona, Spain
- Height: 1.82 m (6 ft 0 in)
- Position: Defender

Youth career
- 2007–2009: La Floresta
- 2009–2010: Gimnàstic

Senior career*
Years	Team	Apps	(Gls)
2010–2013	Gimnàstic	38	(4)
2010–2012	Pobla Mafumet	29	(3)
2011–2012	→ Logroñés (loan)	28	(1)
2013–2014	Almería B	26	(2)
2014–2017	Almería	75	(2)
2017–2018	Wisła Kraków	17	(1)
2018–2020	Aris	47	(5)
2020–2022	Panathinaikos	54	(2)
2022–2023	Al Fateh	21	(0)
2023–2025	Aris	28	(0)
2025–2026	Cartagena	3	(0)
- * Club domestic league appearances and goals as of 15:08, 5 January 2026 (UTC)

Francisco 'Fran' Manuel Vélez Jiménez (born 23 June 1991) is a Spanish professional footballer who plays as a central defender or a right-back.

== Club career ==
=== Gimnàstic ===
Born in Tarragona, Catalonia, Vélez began playing football for Club Esportiu La Floresta. In late 2009 he signed a contract with Gimnàstic de Tarragona, where he spent his last year as a junior.

On 10 April 2010, Vélez made his official Nàstic debut, starting against Albacete Balompié in a 1–1 away draw. He made three more appearances during the season in Segunda División, against Real Betis, Cádiz CF (where he was sent off) and UD Las Palmas. In the following campaign, he represented CF Pobla de Mafumet, the farm team.

Vélez was loaned to UD Logroñés of Segunda División B in August 2011. He scored his only goal of the season against Real Sociedad B, contributing to a 3–1 home win.

On 14 July 2012, Vélez returned to Nàstic and its main squad. On 26 August he played his first game in his second stint, against Valencia CF Mestalla. He netted his first goal with the club on 7 October, opening the 2–0 home victory over CD Binissalem.

=== Almería ===
On 2 September 2013, Vélez signed with UD Almería, initially being assigned to the reserves also in the third division. He made his first-team debut on 14 January of the following year, starting as a right-back in a 2–0 home loss to Racing de Santander in the round of 16 of the Copa del Rey (3–1 loss on aggregate).

Vélez's maiden appearance in La Liga took place on 27 April 2014: he started and scored in a 2–1 win at RCD Espanyol, where he featured as a defensive midfielder before being replaced by Jonathan Zongo in the 71st minute. He played a further three matches with the main squad, only contributing four minutes in the last fixture, a 0–0 home draw against Athletic Bilbao.

On 7 June 2014, Vélez was definitely promoted to the first team. On 31 March 2015, he was ruled out for the remainder of the season after suffering a shoulder injury; the season also ended in relegation.

Vélez was regularly used during the following second-tier campaigns, and cut ties with the club on 28 June 2017.

=== Wisła Kraków ===
On 1 July 2017, Vélez signed with Polish club Wisła Kraków. He scored his only goal in the Ekstraklasa on 18 March 2018, helping to a 2–0 away victory over Legia Warsaw.

=== Aris ===
On 25 July 2018, after the player successfully passed his medicals, Aris Thessaloniki F.C. announced the signing of Vélez on a two-year contract. He scored his first goal for the team the following 24 February, heading home in a 1–1 draw at Super League Greece leaders PAOK FC.

=== Later career ===
Vélez agreed to join Panathinaikos F.C. on 20 February 2020, with the three-year deal being made effective on 1 July. In September 2023, after one season in the Saudi Pro League with Al Fateh SC, the 32-year-old returned to Aris on a two-year contract.

== Personal life ==
Vélez's older brother, José Antonio, was also a footballer. Both played for Gimnàstic and Pobla.

== Career statistics ==
As of match played 14 April 2024

Appearances and goals by club, season and competition
Club	Season	League			National cup (Note: Includes Copa del Rey, Greek Football Cup, King Cup)		Continental		Total	
Club	Season	Division	Apps	Goals	Apps	Goals	Apps	Goals	Apps	Goals
Gimnàstic	2009–10	Segunda División	4	0	0	0	—		4	0
Gimnàstic	2012–13	Segunda División B	34	4	1	0	—		35	4
Gimnàstic	Total		38	4	1	0	—		39	4
Pobla Mafumet	2010–11	Tercera División	29	3	—		—		29	3
Logroñés	2011–12	Segunda División B	28	1	3	0	—		31	1
Almería B	2013–14	Segunda División B	26	2	—		—		26	2
Almería	2013–14	La Liga	4	1	1	0	—		5	1
Almería	2014–15	La Liga	17	0	0	0	—		17	0
Almería	2015–16	Segunda División	30	0	2	0	—		32	0
Almería	2016–17	Segunda División	24	1	0	0	—		24	1
Almería	Total		75	2	3	0	—		78	2
Wisła Kraków	2017–18	Ekstraklasa	17	1	0	0	—		17	1
Aris	2018–19	Super League Greece	23	1	2	0	—		25	1
Aris	2019–20	Super League Greece	24	4	5	0	3 (Note: Appearances in UEFA Europa League)	0	32	4
Aris	Total		47	5	7	0	3	0	57	5
Panathinaikos	2020–21	Super League Greece	25	2	0	0	—		25	2
Panathinaikos	2021–22	Super League Greece	29	0	6	0	—		35	0
Panathinaikos	Total		54	2	6	0	—		60	2
Al-Fateh	2022–23	Saudi Pro League	21	0	2	0	—		23	0
Aris	2023–24	Super League Greece	10	0	3	1	0	0	13	1
Career total			345	20	25	1	3	0	373	21

== Honours ==
Panathinaikos

- Greek Cup: 2021–22
