= Tuni (footballer) =

Spanish footballer

Personal information
- Full name: Antoni Lluís Adrover Colom
- Date of birth: 14 June 1982 (age 44)
- Place of birth: Sóller, Spain
- Height: 1.81 m (5 ft 11 1/2 in)
- Position: Attacking midfielder

Youth career
- Mallorca

Senior career*
Years	Team	Apps	(Gls)
2001–2003	Mallorca B	43	(10)
2002–2011	Mallorca	106	(4)
2003–2004	→ Salamanca (loan)	39	(4)
2008–2009	→ Hércules (loan)	37	(3)
2011	→ Gimnàstic (loan)	11	(0)
2011–2012	Gimnàstic	26	(3)
2013	Iraklis	5	(1)
2013–2015	Sóller	?	(7)
Total		267+	(32)
- * Club domestic league appearances and goals

Antoni Lluís Adrover Colom (born 14 June 1982), known as Tuni, is a Spanish former professional footballer who played mainly as an attacking midfielder.

He amassed La Liga totals of 106 matches and four goals over seven seasons, all with Mallorca.

== Club career ==
Born in Sóller, Mallorca, Balearic Islands, Tuni made his professional debut with hometown RCD Mallorca's first team during the 2002–03 season, making five appearances and scoring one goal. He played his first La Liga match on 8 December 2002 in a 1–5 home loss against Real Madrid, and would be loaned for the following campaign to Segunda División side UD Salamanca.

After four seasons in which his role was irregular (65 appearances from 2004 to 2006, 27 the following two), Tuni was loaned again, to second-tier Hércules CF for the duration of 2008–09. Returned to Mallorca for the subsequent top-flight campaign, he suffered a severe knee injury which limited his participation to just nine games out of 38.

In late January 2011, Tuni was loaned to Gimnàstic de Tarragona for five months, and contributed seven starts – 560 minutes in total – as they narrowly avoided relegation from division two. He became a free agent in July, and signed a permanent contract with the Catalans.

Tuni joined Iraklis F.C. on 11 January 2013, teaming up with several compatriots at the Football League (Greece) club.

== Honours ==
Mallorca

- Copa del Rey: 2002–03
