= Rubén Pérez (footballer, born 1980) =

Spanish footballer

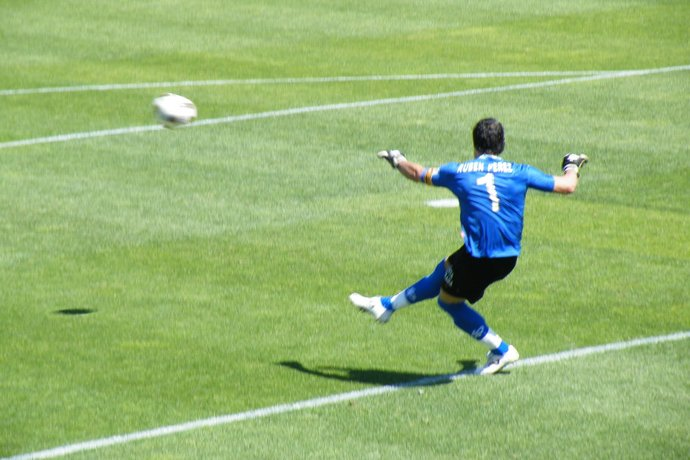
- Pérez taking a goal kick for Gimnàstic (2011)

Personal information
- Full name: Rubén Pérez Chueca
- Date of birth: 7 August 1980 (age 46)
- Place of birth: Zaragoza, Spain
- Height: 1.85 m (6 ft 1 in)
- Position: Goalkeeper

Youth career
- Helios
- 1997–1999: Stadium Casablanca

Senior career*
Years	Team	Apps	(Gls)
1999–2000	Figueruelas	14	(0)
2000–2002	Huesca	33	(0)
2002–2004	Alavés B	68	(0)
2004–2006	Badajoz	50	(0)
2006–2014	Gimnàstic	239	(0)
2014	Huesca	12	(0)
2014–2015	Torreforta	16	(0)
2015	Reus	0	(0)
Total		432	(0)
- * Club domestic league appearances and goals

Rubén Pérez Chueca (born 7 August 1980) is a Spanish former professional footballer who played as a goalkeeper.

He spent most of his career with Gimnàstic, representing the club in all three major levels of Spanish football and appearing in 241 competitive matches in eight years.

== Club career ==
Born in Zaragoza, Aragon, Pérez began his career with CF Figueruelas in the Segunda División B, moving to Tercera División with neighbouring SD Huesca in the summer of 2000 and achieving promotion to the former in his first season. He continued competing at that level the following years, with Deportivo Alavés B and CD Badajoz.

In January 2006, Pérez signed with Gimnàstic de Tarragona of Segunda División, playing his first game with the Catalan team on 26 February against Lorca Deportiva CF. He appeared in a further 16 matches as the campaign ended in promotion.

In 2006–07, Pérez battled with Albano Bizzarri for first-choice status, making his La Liga debut on 28 October 2006 in a 1–3 home loss to Real Madrid. Both players ended the season with roughly the same number of appearances, and Nàstic returned to where they had come from in June.

Pérez played second-fiddle to loanee Roberto in the 2007–08 season, but regained his starting position subsequently, with relegation to the third division befalling in 2012. In July of that year, he renewed his contract for two more seasons with the option to a third.

On 31 January 2014, after being left out of the squad for the campaign, Pérez cut ties with Gimnàstic and moved to fellow third-tier SD Huesca on 3 February. He left the latter club in May, and joined amateurs CDC Torreforta in August, where he was used as a centre-back.

On 28 January 2015, Pérez returned to the goal and the third division, signing for CF Reus Deportiu.

== Career statistics ==
Appearances and goals by club, season and competition
Club	Season	League			National cup		Other		Total	
Club	Season	Division	Apps	Goals	Apps	Goals	Apps	Goals	Apps	Goals
Figueruelas	1999–2000	Segunda División B	14	0	1	0	—		15	0
Huesca	2001–02	Segunda División B	33	0	0	0	—		33	0
Alavés B	2002–03	Segunda División B	37	0	—		—		37	0
Alavés B	2003–04	Segunda División B	31	0	—		—		31	0
Alavés B	Total		68	0	—		—		68	0
Alavés	2002–03	La Liga	0	0	—		—		0	0
Alavés	2003–04	Segunda División	0	0	—		—		0	0
Alavés	Total		0	0	—		—		0	0
Badajoz	2004–05	Segunda División B	37	0	0	0	—		37	0
Badajoz	2005–06	Segunda División B	13	0	0	0	—		13	0
Badajoz	Total		50	0	0	0	—		50	0
Gimnàstic	2005–06	Segunda División	17	0	0	0	—		17	0
Gimnàstic	2006–07	La Liga	16	0	1	0	—		17	0
Gimnàstic	2007–08	Segunda División	10	0	0	0	—		10	0
Gimnàstic	2008–09	Segunda División	33	0	0	0	—		33	0
Gimnàstic	2009–10	Segunda División	41	0	1	0	—		41	0
Gimnàstic	2010–11	Segunda División	41	0	0	0	—		41	0
Gimnàstic	2011–12	Segunda División	42	0	0	0	—		42	0
Gimnàstic	2012–13	Segunda División B	38	0	0	0	—		38	0
Gimnàstic	Total		238	0	2	0	—		240	0
Huesca	2013–14	Segunda División B	12	0	0	0	—		12	0
Reus	2014–15	Segunda División B	0	0	—		0	0	0	0
Career total			415	0	3	0	0	0	418	172
