= Alejandro Campano =

Spanish footballer

Personal information
- Full name: Alejandro Campano Hernando
- Date of birth: 29 December 1978 (age 47)
- Place of birth: Seville, Spain
- Height: 1.78 m (5 ft 10 in)
- Position: Midfielder

Youth career
- Sevilla

Senior career*
Years	Team	Apps	(Gls)
1997–2000	Sevilla B	81	(8)
1997	→ Dos Hermanas (loan)		
2000–2001	Mallorca B	36	(8)
2001–2006	Mallorca	141	(12)
2006–2010	Gimnàstic	126	(21)
2010–2011	Vaslui	17	(0)
2011–2012	Xerez	23	(3)
Total		424	(52)
- * Club domestic league appearances and goals

Alejandro Campano Hernando (born 29 December 1978) is a Spanish former professional footballer who played mainly as a right midfielder.

== Club career ==
Campano was born in Seville, Andalusia. He amassed La Liga totals of 170 games and 15 goals over the course of six seasons, mainly with RCD Mallorca.

Campano also represented in the competition Gimnàstic de Tarragona, and retired in June 2012 at the age of 33 after one year in the Segunda División with Xerez CD, later working as a sports agent.

== Honours ==
Mallorca

- Copa del Rey: 2002–03
