= Pedro Mairata =

Spanish footballer

Personal information
- Full name: Pedro Mairata Gual
- Date of birth: 15 January 1979 (age 47)
- Place of birth: Manacor, Spain
- Height: 1.89 m (6 ft 2 in)
- Position: Centre-back

Senior career*
Years	Team	Apps	(Gls)
1997–2003	Constància		
2003–2004	Las Palmas B		
2004–2005	Levante B	35	(3)
2005–2006	Eibar	30	(2)
2006–2007	Almería	15	(0)
2007–2013	Gimnàstic	150	(9)
2013–2015	Atlético Baleares	62	(0)
2015–2017	Llosetense	36	(1)
2017–2018	Constància	27	(2)
Total		355	(17)
- * Club domestic league appearances and goals

Pedro Mairata Gual (born 15 January 1979) is a Spanish former professional footballer who played as a central defender.

== Club career ==
Mairata was born in Manacor, Balearic Islands. Until the age of 26, he played in the Segunda División B or lower, representing local CE Constància, UD Las Palmas Atlético and Atlético Levante UD. In 2005, he signed for Basque club SD Eibar, being regularly used but suffering relegation from Segunda División; even though the team produced the ninth-best defensive record in the league (45 goals in 42 matches), they finished last.

After one year with UD Almería in the second tier, contributing 15 matches to the Andalusia side's first-ever promotion to La Liga, Mairata joined Gimnàstic de Tarragona of the same league. After six seasons at the Nou Estadi de Tarragona, five of those in the second division, he was released.
