= Fernando Morán (footballer) =

Spanish footballer

Personal information
- Full name: Fernando Morán Escudero
- Date of birth: 27 April 1976 (age 50)
- Place of birth: Madrid, Spain
- Height: 1.76 m (5 ft 9 in)
- Position: Midfielder

Youth career
- 1986–1986: Salesianos Atocha
- 1986–1994: Real Madrid

Senior career*
Years	Team	Apps	(Gls)
1994–1995	Real Madrid C	23	(3)
1995–1997	Real Madrid B	49	(4)
1997–2005	Racing Santander	152	(11)
1997–1998	→ Numancia (loan)	22	(3)
1998–1999	→ Ourense (loan)	36	(3)
2005–2007	Cádiz	29	(0)
2007–2008	Albacete	38	(3)
2008–2009	Hércules	28	(5)
2009–2012	Gimnàstic	105	(19)
2012–2013	Alcorcón	23	(0)
Total		505	(51)

International career
1992	Spain U16	6	(2)
1992	Spain U17	3	(0)
1994	Spain U18	4	(1)
- * Club domestic league appearances and goals

Fernando Morán Escudero (born 27 April 1976) is a Spanish former professional footballer who played as a midfielder.

He amassed La Liga totals of 140 games and six goals over eight seasons, almost exclusively at the service of Racing de Santander. In a 19-year senior career, he added 342 matches and 42 goals in the Segunda División in representation of nine teams.

== Club career ==
Morán was born in Madrid, and played youth football with local and La Liga giants Real Madrid. He started his professional career with the club's reserves, spending one and a half seasons in the Segunda División.

In late January 1997, Morán signed with Racing de Santander of the top flight, making his debut in the competition on the 26th by coming on as a late substitute in a 0–0 away draw against Sevilla FC. He scored his first league goal on 9 September 2000, a last-minute 2–2 equaliser at Real Sociedad, as the Cantabrians went on to suffer relegation; he was loaned twice in his beginnings with the club, to second-division sides CD Numancia and CD Ourense.

Morán left Racing in June 2005, joining Cádiz CF of the main division the following January. He was sparingly used over the course of two seasons, being relegated in his first.

Until his retirement in June 2013 at the age of 37, Morán subsequently competed solely in the second tier, appearing for Albacete Balompié, Hércules CF, Gimnàstic de Tarragona and AD Alcorcón. In the 2009–10 campaign he netted a career-best seven goals in 39 games for Catalonia's Nàstic, helping them to the 18th position and narrowly avoid relegation.

== Personal life ==
Morán worked with several non-governmental organizations, also sponsoring underprivileged youths.

He served as drummer for rock band Hacia donde.
