= 2011–12 CD Guadalajara season =

CD Guadalajara
2011–12 season
- President: Germán Retuerta
- Manager: Carlos Terrazas
- Liga Adelante: 13th
- Copa del Rey: Second Round
- Top goalscorer: League: Ernesto (6); All: Ernesto (6)
Home colours	Away colours	Third colours

The 2011–2012 will be the 64th in the club's history. It will also be their debut season in Segunda División, the second tier of Spanish football. The club will compete in the Liga Adelante and Copa del Rey.

== Season overview ==
=== July ===
Guadalajara geared up for their debut in Segunda División over the summer by adding 10 new players to the squad in hopes of repeating back-to-back promotions.

On 19 July, Jonan García, Ander Gago, Cristian Fernández and Joseba Arriaga were presented as new Guadalajara players.

On 25 July, young goalkeeper Javier González Nieto joined the club from Valencia B.

On 26 July, Víctor Fernández Maza became the sixth signing when he joined from Celta Vigo. Capped by the Spain U20 team and game experience in the Segunda División, Fernández stated "he is ready to fight for a spot on the team and the team shows lots of promise."

=== August ===
On 4 August, Guadalajara signed midfielder Jonathan Ñíguez from Las Palmas for the next 2 seasons.

On 18 August, Guadalajara capture French defender Mickaël Gaffoor from Celta Vigo. He stated "when the opportunity was presented to play in Segunda División, I could not give it a second thought."

On 19 August, the Association of Spanish Footballers (AFE) went on strike due to unpaid wages for players in the top two divisions of Spanish football by clubs who have gone into financial administration. The AFE and Liga de Fútbol Profesional (LFP) have yet to agree on a guaranteed fund to protect players' wages in the event of their clubs being declared insolvent. The strike forced Spanish league games scheduled for the weekend of August 20 and 21, including Guadalajara's season opener against Numancia, to be postponed.

On 27 August, Guadalajara started their league season with a 1–1 draw at Estadio Pedro Escartín against Las Palmas after their Match 1 was postponed to 26 October.

On 30 August, midfielder Rodrigo Suárez Peña, better known as Rodri, completed his move to Guadalajara. He stated "it seems like a great group, together we'll try to reach our goals."

=== September ===
On 1 September, Guadalajara signed Scottish forward Ryan Harper from Real Betis B. The 24-year-old player stated "he was happy of how well he was received, and how friendly and comfortable his new club has made him."

On 3 September, Guadalajara notched their first ever win and first one on the road in Segunda División with a 0–2 victory against Xerez.

On 7 September, Guadalajara were eliminated from the Copa del Rey by Almería with a 2–0 defeat in extra time.

On 24 September, Guadalajara defeated Cartagena 2–0 to take over 1st place in the Liga Adelante standings for the first time in their history.

=== October ===
The month started with Guadalajara losing back-to-back fixtures including a heavy 4–0 defeat at Riazor against Deportivo La Coruña. The following Match Day, the club lost 1–2 at home to Hércules and also lost Ryan Harper with a rupture of the anterior cruciate ligament in his left knee.

== Current squad ==
As of 29 January 2012.

No.	Nationality	Name	Date of Birth (Age)	Signed in	Signed from	Apps.	Goals	Notes
Goalkeepers
1	(Spain)	Jorge Sanmiguel	30 August 1978 (age 47)	2005	Pego	57	0	
13	(Spain)	Mikel Saizar	18 January 1983 (age 43)	2010	Cultural Leonesa	30	0	
Defenders
2	(Spain)	Antonio Moreno	13 February 1983 (age 43)	2009	Cultural Leonesa	68	0	
3	(Spain)	Javi Barral	30 September 1981 (age 44)	2010	Oviedo	39	0	
4	(Spain)	David Fernández	6 April 1985 (age 41)	2009	Linares	74	0	
5	(France)	Mickaël Gaffoor	21 January 1987 (age 39)	2011	Celta Vigo	1	0	
8	(Spain)	Javi Soria	16 May 1984 (age 41)	2009	Conquense	76	11	
15	(Spain)	Ander Gago	10 September 1984 (age 41)	2011	Real Murcia	4	0	
18	(Spain)	Víctor Fernández	25 August 1987 (age 38)	2011	Celta Vigo	3	0	
19	(Spain)	Jorge Martín (C)	24 November 1975 (age 50)	2007	Youth system	133	0	
Midfielders
6	(Spain)	Rodri	7 March 1986 (age 40)	2011	Real Betis	1	0	
10	(Spain)	Jony	2 April 1985 (age 41)	2011	Las Palmas	3	0	
11	(Spain)	Ernesto Gómez	26 April 1985 (age 41)	2010	Alcorcón	35	6	
12	(Spain)	José Oya	14 January 1983 (age 43)	2010	Barakaldo	32	2	
17	(Spain)	Iván Moreno	26 February 1981 (age 45)	2006	Díter Zafra	144	24	
21	(Spain)	Jonan García	8 January 1989 (age 37)	2011	Écija	4	0	
22	(Spain)	Gerard Badía	18 October 1989 (age 36)	2010	Real Murcia B	20	1	
Forwards
7	(Spain)	Joseba Arriaga	28 July 1982 (age 43)	2011	Ceuta	4	0	Source
9	(Mexico)	Aníbal Zurdo	3 December 1982 (age 43)	2010	Leganés	40	12	
16	(Scotland)	Ryan Harper	16 April 1987 (age 39)	2011	Real Betis B	2	0	Source
20	(Spain)	Cristian Fernández	22 December 1988 (age 37)	2011	Albacete	2	0	
24	(Spain)	José Collado	24 March 1990 (age 36)	2012	(Portugal) Braga	0	0	On loan

== Transfers ==
=== In ===
Pos	Player	From	Type	Source
GK	(Spain) Javi Nieto	(Spain) Valencia B	Transfer	CDGuadalajara.es
DF	(France) Mickaël Gaffoor	(Spain) Celta Vigo	Transfer	CDGuadalajara.es
DF	(Spain) Ander Gago	(Spain) Real Murcia	Transfer	CDGuadalajara.es
DF	(Spain) Víctor Fernández	(Spain) Celta B	Transfer	CDGuadalajara.es
MF	(Spain) Jonan García	(Spain) Écija	Transfer	CDGuadalajara.es
MF	(Spain) Rodrigo Suárez Peña	(Spain) Real Betis	Transfer	CDGuadalajara.es
MF	(Spain) Jonathan Ñíguez	(Spain) Las Palmas	Transfer	CDGuadalajara.es
FW	(Scotland) Ryan Harper	(Spain) Real Betis B	Transfer	CDGuadalajara.es
FW	(Spain) Cristian Fernández	(Spain) Albacete	Transfer	CDGuadalajara.es
FW	(Spain) Joseba Arriaga	(Spain) Ceuta	Transfer	CDGuadalajara.es
FW	(Spain) José Collado	(Portugal) Braga	Loan	CDGuadalajara.es

=== Out ===
Pos	Player	To	Type
DF	(Spain) Carlos Quesada	(Spain) Atlético Baleares	Contract terminated
DF	(Spain) Oinatz Bilbao	(Spain) Lemona	Contract terminated
DF	(Spain) Marcos Cerrudo	(Spain) Alcalá	Contract terminated
MF	(Spain) Rubén Cuesta	(Spain) Lucena	Transfer
FW	(Spain) Nico	(Spain) Tenerife	Contract terminated
FW	(Spain) Juanjo Serrano	(Spain) Granada	Transfer
GK	(Spain) Javier Nieto	(Spain) Atlético Madrid C	Contract terminated

== Team Stats ==
No.	Pos	Nat	Player	Total		Liga Adelante		Copa del Rey	
No.	Pos	Nat	Player	Apps	Goals	Apps	Goals	Apps	Goals
1	GK	(Spain) ESP	Jorge Sanmiguel	0	0	0	0	0	0
13	GK	(Spain) ESP	Mikel Saizar	21	0	20	0	1	0
2	DF	(Spain) ESP	Antonio Moreno	17	1	17	1	0	0
3	DF	(Spain) ESP	Javi Barral	19	1	18	1	1	0
4	DF	(Spain) ESP	David Fernández	16	0	15	0	1	0
5	DF	(France) FRA	Mickaël Gaffoor	12	1	11	1	1	0
8	DF	(Spain) ESP	Javi Soria	20	2	19	2	1	0
15	DF	(Spain) ESP	Ander Gago	17	1	16	1	1	0
18	DF	(Spain) ESP	Víctor Fernández	8	0	7	0	1	0
19	DF	(Spain) ESP	Jorge Martín	8	0	8	0	0	0
26	DF	(Spain) ESP	Gonzalo Rodríguez	1	0	1	0	0	0
6	MF	(Spain) ESP	Rodri	16	1	15	1	1	0
10	MF	(Spain) ESP	Jony	19	0	18	0	1	0
11	MF	(Spain) ESP	Ernesto Gómez	20	6	20	6	0	0
12	MF	(Spain) ESP	José Oya	0	0	0	0	0	0
17	MF	(Spain) ESP	Iván Moreno	19	3	19	3	0	0
21	MF	(Spain) ESP	Jonan García	20	0	19	0	1	0
22	MF	(Spain) ESP	Gerard Badía	10	0	10	0	0	0
7	FW	(Spain) ESP	Joseba Arriaga	12	0	11	0	1	0
9	FW	(Mexico) MEX	Aníbal Zurdo	20	5	19	5	1	0
16	FW	(Scotland) SCO	Ryan Harper	6	1	5	1	1	0
20	FW	(Spain) ESP	Cristian Fernández	10	0	9	0	1	0
24	FW	(Spain) ESP	José Collado	0	0	0	0	0	0

Last updated on 29 January.

== Season results ==
=== League table ===
Pos	Team	Pld	W	D	L	GF	GA	GD	Pts
14	Xerez	42	13	11	18	50	66	−16	50
15	Girona	42	12	13	17	58	61	−3	49 (Note: GIR 0–0 GUA; GUA 1–4 GIR)
16	Guadalajara	42	14	7	21	50	75	−25	49
17	Recreativo	42	12	11	19	49	52	−3	47 (Note: REC 0–2 MUR; MUR 0–3 REC)
18	Murcia	42	13	8	21	49	67	−18	47

Source: LFP - Liga Adelante
Rules for classification: 1st points; 2nd head-to-head points; 3rd head-to-head goal difference; 4th head-to-head goals scored; 5th goal difference; 6th number of goals scored; 7th Fair-play points

=== Results summary ===
Overall								Home						Away					
Pld	W	D	L	GF	GA	GD	Pts	W	D	L	GF	GA	GD	W	D	L	GF	GA	GD
22	8	5	9	23	35	−12	29	6	2	4	16	16	0	2	3	5	7	19	−12

Last updated: 29 January.
Source: Competitive Matches

=== Results by round ===
Round	1	2	3	4	5	6	7	8	9	10	11	12	13	14	15	16	17	18	19	20	21	22	23	24	25	26	27	28	29	30	31	32	33	34	35	36	37	38	39	40	41	42
Ground	A	H	A	H	A	H	A	H	A	H	A	H	H	A	H	A	H	A	H	A	H	H	A	H	A	H	A	H	A	H	A	H	A	A	H	A	H	A	H	A	H	A
Result	L	D	W	W	D	W	L	L	W	W	L	L	D	D	W	D	W	L	L	L	L	W																				
Position	7	14	6	5	5	1	7	9	5	3	12	12	13	13	11	11	8	9	11	13	14	13																				

Updated to match(es) played on 29 January. Source: CDGuadalajara.es
A = Away; H = Home; W = Win; D = Draw; L = Loss

=== Pre-season ===
Kickoff times are in CET.

Match Results
Match Type	Date	Time	Opponents	H/A	Result F–A	Scorers	Attendance
Friendly	27 July 2011	20:00	Azuqueca	A	4–0	Fernández 19', Zurdo 29', Moreno 36', Jorge 53'	
Trofeo Campiña de Marchamalo	30 July 2011	19:30	Marchamalo	A	7–1	Moreno (2) 26', 66', Jonan 64', Ernesto 72', Cristian 77', Javi 85', Arriaga 89'	
Friendly	2 August 2011	20:30	Zamora	A	0–0		
Friendly	4 August 2011	20:30	Leganés	A	1–1	Ernesto 37'	
Trofeo Cervantes	6 August 2011	20:30	Alcalá	A	0–2		
Friendly	10 August 2011	14:00	Real Madrid Castilla	A	2–2	Jonan García 87', Zurdo 90+1'	
Friendly	11 August 2011	14:00	Atlético Madrid B	A	3–2	Badía 16', I. Moreno 34', Zurdo 47'	
Friendly	13 August 2011	13:30	Alavés	A	0–0		

=== Liga Adelante ===
Kickoff times are in CET.

Match Results
Round	Date	Time	Opponents	H/A	Result F–A	Scorers	Attendance	Referee	League position
2011
1	21 August	18:00	Numancia	A	PPD				–
2	27 August	18:00	Las Palmas	H	1–1	Ruymán 44' (o.g.)	3,500	Valdés Aller (Castile and León)	14th
3	3 September	18:00	Xerez	A	2–0	Zurdo 21', Ernesto 53'	8,842	Miranda Torres (Catalonia)	▲6th
4	10 September	18:00	Huesca	H	2–1	Zurdo 17', Ernesto 36'	3,000	López Acera (Extremadura)	▲5th
5	18 September	20:00	Villarreal B	A	3–3	I. Moreno 13', Harper 49', Ernesto 61' (p)	900	Mariscal Sánchez (Andalusia)	5th
6	24 September	18:00	Cartagena	H	2–0	I. Moreno 32', Zurdo 53'	3,500	Jaime Latre (Aragon)	▲1st
7	1 October	16:00	Deportivo	A	0–4		30,000	Melero López (Andalusia)	▼7th
8	8 October	12:00	Hércules	H	1–2	Ander Gago 90+1'	3,500	Piñeiro Crespo (Asturias)	▼9th
9	16 October	18:00	Barcelona B	A	2–1	Zurdo 35', Javi Soria 90+2'	5,500	Hernández Hernández (Canary Islands)	▲5th
10	21 October	21:00	Sabadell	H	1–0	Ernesto 63'	3,000	Juan Martínez Munuera (Valencian Community)	▲3rd
1	26 October	21:00	Numancia	A	0–4		3,000	Ricardo de Burgos Bengoetxea (Basque Country)	▼7th
11	29 October	18:00	Alcorcón	A	0–1		2,500	Valdés Aller (Castile and León)	▼12th
12	5 November	18:00	Recreativo	H	0–2		2,600	Ocón Arraiz (La Rioja)	12th
13	13 November	12:00	Alcoyano	H	1–1	Javi Soria 2'	3,000	Lesma López (Community of Madrid)	▼13th
14	19 November	21:00	Gimnàstic	A	0–0		5,382	Bikandi Garrido (Basque Country)	13th
15	26 November	16:00	Córdoba	H	3–1	Rodri 30', Ernesto 33', Zurdo 69'	3,500	Sureda Cuenca (Balearic Islands)	▲11th
16	3 December	18:00	Girona	A	0–0		4,500	Amoedo Chas (Galicia)	11th
17	11 December	18:00	Real Murcia	H	2–1	Gaffoor 12', I. Moreno 32'	2,800	Prieto Iglesias (Navarre)	▲8th
18	17 December	18:00	Celta Vigo	A	0–2		8,208	Gil Manzano (Extremadura)	▼9th
2012
19	7 January	18:00	Elche	H	2–4	Javi Barral 2', Iván Moreno 39'	4,000	José María Sánchez Martínez (Murcia)	▼11th
20	15 January	16:00	Almería	A	0–4		5,696	Latre Santiago (Aragon)	▼13th
21	21 January	18:00	Valladolid	H	0–3		5,000	Buros Bengoetxea (Basque Country)	▼14th
22	28 January	18:00	Numancia	H	1–0	Collado 67'	4,500	Amoedo Chas (Galicia)	▲13th
23	4 February		Las Palmas	A					
24	11 February		Xerez	H					
25	18 February		Huesca	A					
26	25 February		Villarreal B	H					
27	3 March		Cartagena	A					
28	10 March		Deportivo	H					
29	17 March		Hércules	A					
30	20 March		Barcelona B	H					
31	24 March		Sabadell	A					
32	31 March		Alcorcón	H					
33	7 April		Recreativo	A					
34	14 April		Alcoyano	A					
35	21 April		Gimnàstic	H					
36	28 April		Córdoba	A					
37	5 May		Girona	H					
38	12 May		Real Murcia	A					
39	15 May		Celta Vigo	H					
40	19 May		Elche	A					
41	26 May		Almería	H					
42	2 June		Valladolid	A					

=== Copa del Rey ===
Kickoff times are in CET.

Match Results
Round	Date	Time	Opponents	H/A	Result F–A	Scorers	Attendance	Referee
Second round	7 September 2011	21:00	Almería	A	0–2 (a.e.t.)		4,477	Sureda Cuenca (Balearic Islands)
