= List of Spanish football transfers summer 2011 =

== Summer 2011 La Liga transfer window ==
Date	Name	Moving from	Moving to	Fee
13 April 2011	(Senegal) Ibrahima Baldé	(Spain) Atlético Madrid	(Spain) CA Osasuna	Free
9 May 2011	(Turkey) Nuri Şahin	(Germany) Borussia Dortmund	(Spain) Real Madrid	€10m
15 May 2011	(Argentina) Martín Demichelis	(Germany) FC Bayern Munich	(Spain) Málaga CF	€3m
19 May 2011	(Portugal) Sílvio Pereira	(Portugal) S.C. Braga	(Spain) Atlético Madrid	€8m
19 May 2011	(Turkey) Hamit Altıntop	(Germany) FC Bayern Munich	(Spain) Real Madrid	Free
19 May 2011	(Brazil) Diego Alves	(Spain) UD Almería	(Spain) Valencia CF	€3m
20 May 2011	(Spain) Denis Suárez	(Spain) Celta de Vigo	(England) Manchester City	€1m
20 May 2011	(Spain) José Javier Barkero	(Spain) CD Numancia	(Spain) Levante UD	Free
21 May 2011	(Spain) Nolito	(Spain) FC Barcelona B	(Portugal) S.L. Benfica	Free
22 May 2011	(Spain) Víctor Vázquez	(Spain) FC Barcelona B	(Belgium) Club Brugge	Free
23 May 2011	(Germany) Piotr Trochowski	(Germany) Hamburger SV	(Spain) Sevilla FC	Free
23 May 2011	(Spain) Manu del Moral	(Spain) Getafe CF	(Spain) Sevilla FC	€4.5m
23 May 2011	(Spain) José Callejón	(Spain) RCD Espanyol	(Spain) Real Madrid	€5.5m
23 May 2011	(Spain) Miguel Bedoya	(Spain) Getafe CF B	(Spain) CD Numancia	Free
23 May 2011	(Uruguay) Juan Ángel Albín	(Spain) Getafe CF	(Spain) RCD Espanyol	€3m
23 May 2011	(Uruguay) Adrián Luna	(Uruguay) Defensor Sporting	(Spain) RCD Espanyol	€1.5m
24 May 2011	(Spain) Javier Chica	(Spain) RCD Espanyol	(Spain) Real Betis	Free
24 May 2011	(Spain) Diego Castro	(Spain) Sporting de Gijón	(Spain) Getafe CF	Free
25 May 2011	(Spain) Pedro Vázquez	(Spain) Celta de Vigo B	(Spain) Villarreal CF B	Free
26 May 2011	(Algeria) Mehdi Lacen	(Spain) Racing de Santander	(Spain) Getafe CF	Free
26 May 2011	(Brazil) Renato	(Spain) Sevilla FC	(Brazil) Botafogo FR	Free
27 May 2011	(Spain) Gabi	(Spain) Real Zaragoza	(Spain) Atlético Madrid	€3m
27 May 2011	(Brazil) Miranda	(Brazil) São Paulo FC	(Spain) Atlético Madrid	Free
28 May 2011	(Spain) Juan Rodríguez	(Spain) Deportivo de La Coruña	(Spain) Getafe CF	Free
28 May 2011	(Spain) Rubén González	(Spain) RCD Mallorca	(Spain) CA Osasuna	Free
28 May 2011	(Uruguay) Damián Suárez	(Uruguay) Defensor Sporting	(Spain) Sporting de Gijón	€0.43m
30 May 2011	(Ecuador) Felipe Caicedo	(England) Manchester City	(Spain) Levante UD	€1m
31 May 2011	(Uruguay) Martín Cáceres	(Spain) FC Barcelona	(Spain) Sevilla FC	€3m
31 May 2011	(Spain) Dídac Vilà	(Italy) A.C. Milan	(Spain) RCD Espanyol	Loan
1 June 2011	(Spain) Pablo Pallarés	(Spain) CD Roquetas	(Spain) UD Almería	Free
1 June 2011	(Spain) Manolo Reina	(Spain) Levante UD	(Spain) FC Cartagena	Free
1 June 2011	(Netherlands) Ruud van Nistelrooy	(Germany) Hamburger SV	(Spain) Málaga CF	Free
2 June 2011	(Spain) César Sánchez	(Spain) Valencia CF	(Spain) Villarreal CF	Free
3 June 2011	(Brazil) Sueliton Pereira	(Brazil) EC São José	(Spain) Rayo Vallecano	Free
3 June 2011	(Spain) Coke	(Spain) Rayo Vallecano	(Spain) Sevilla FC	€1.7m
3 June 2011	(Spain) Dani Parejo	(Spain) Getafe CF	(Spain) Valencia CF	€5m
6 June 2011	(Spain) Miguel Ángel Moyá	(Spain) Valencia CF	(Spain) Getafe CF	Loan
6 June 2011	(Spain) Dimas Delgado	(Spain) CD Numancia	(Spain) FC Cartagena	Free
7 June 2011	(Spain) Marc Bertrán	(Spain) CD Tenerife	(Spain) CA Osasuna	Free
7 June 2011	(Spain) Toño	(Spain) CD Castellón	(Spain) Villarreal CF B	€0.025m
8 June 2011	(Spain) Mario Álvarez	(Spain) Getafe CF	(Spain) Real Betis	Free
10 June 2011	(Spain) Nacho Monreal	(Spain) CA Osasuna	(Spain) Málaga CF	€6m
11 June 2011	(Germany) David Odonkor	(Spain) Real Betis	(Germany) Karlsruher SC	Free
11 June 2011	(Spain) David Vázquez	(Spain) UD Melilla	(Spain) SD Huesca	Free
13 June 2011	(Spain) Edu Oriol	(Spain) FC Barcelona B	(Spain) Real Zaragoza	Free
13 June 2011	(Spain) Abraham Minero	(Spain) FC Barcelona B	(Spain) Real Zaragoza	Free
13 June 2011	(Spain) Tato	(Spain) Albacete Balompié	(Spain) Xerez CD	Free
14 June 2011	(Spain) Nino	(Spain) CD Tenerife	(Spain) CA Osasuna	Free
15 June 2011	(Spain) Alejandro García	(Spain) SD Ponferradina	(Spain) Recreativo de Huelva	Free
15 June 2011	(Spain) Iván Marcano	(Spain) Getafe CF	(Spain) Villarreal CF	Loan return
15 June 2011	(Spain) Iván Marcano	(Spain) Villarreal CF	(Greece) Olympiacos F.C.	Loan
15 June 2011	(Spain) Carlos Caballero	(Spain) Cádiz CF	(Spain) Córdoba CF	Free
15 June 2011	(Spain) José María López Silva	(Spain) Cádiz CF	(Spain) Córdoba CF	Free
15 June 2011	(Spain) Jaime Astrain	(Spain) CA Osasuna B	(Spain) Córdoba CF	Free
16 June 2011	(Netherlands) Joris Mathijsen	(Germany) Hamburger SV	(Spain) Málaga CF	€1m
16 June 2011	(Switzerland) Fabio Coltorti	(Spain) Racing de Santander	(Switzerland) FC Lausanne-Sport	Free
16 June 2011	(Spain) Ricardo León	(Spain) CD Tenerife	(Spain) Sporting de Gijón	Free
16 June 2011	(Spain) Javier Farinós	(Spain) Hércules CF	(Spain) Levante UD	Free
16 June 2011	(Netherlands) Marvin Zeegelaar	(Netherlands) AFC Ajax	(Spain) RCD Espanyol	Free
16 June 2011	(Argentina) Óscar Trejo	(Spain) Rayo Vallecano	(Spain) RCD Mallorca	Loan return
16 June 2011	(Argentina) Óscar Trejo	(Spain) RCD Mallorca	(Spain) Sporting de Gijón	Free
17 June 2011	(Spain) Héctor Simón	(Spain) CD Castellón	(Spain) CE Sabadell FC	Free
17 June 2011	(France) Jérémy Toulalan	(France) Olympique Lyonnais	(Spain) Málaga CF	€10m
18 June 2011	(Spain) Miguel Pallardó	(Spain) Getafe CF	(Spain) Levante UD	€0.2m
18 June 2011	(Israel) Tomer Hemed	(Israel) Maccabi Haifa	(Spain) RCD Mallorca	Free
19 June 2011	(Czech Republic) Tomáš Ujfaluši	(Spain) Atlético Madrid	(Turkey) Galatasaray	€2m
20 June 2011	(Spain) Juan Collantes	(Spain) Granada CF	(Spain) FC Cartagena	Free
20 June 2011	(Spain) Nacho Zabal	(Spain) CA Osasuna	(Spain) CD Numancia	Loan
20 June 2011	(Ghana) Derek Boateng	(Spain) Getafe CF	(Ukraine) FC Dnipro Dnipropetrovsk	€6m
20 June 2011	(Spain) Adrián Ripa	(Spain) Elche CF	(Spain) CD Numancia	Free
20 June 2011	(Spain) Manu Torres	(Spain) Málaga CF	(Spain) FC Cartagena	Free
20 June 2011	(Spain) Gorka Kijera	(Spain) SD Eibar	(Spain) FC Cartagena	Free
20 June 2011	(Brazil) Cléber Monteiro	(Portugal) Vitória S.C.	(Spain) FC Cartagena	Free
20 June 2011	(France) Thierry Florian	(Spain) Orihuela CF	(Spain) CE Sabadell FC	Free
20 June 2011	(Spain) Ekhi Senar	(Spain) CA Osasuna B	(Spain) SD Huesca	Loan
20 June 2011	(Spain) Javier Matilla	(Spain) Villarreal CF	(Spain) Real Betis	€1.2m
21 June 2011	(Spain) Mario Bermejo	(Spain) Xerez CD	(Spain) Celta de Vigo	Free
21 June 2011	(Spain) Juan Francisco Aranda	(Spain) Recreativo de Huelva	(Spain) CD San Roque	Free
21 June 2011	(Spain) Alberto Lopo	(Spain) Deportivo de La Coruña	(Spain) Getafe CF	Free
21 June 2011	(Spain) Richi	(Spain) Córdoba CF	(Spain) Girona FC	Free
22 June 2011	(Mexico) Héctor Moreno	(Netherlands) AZ Alkmaar	(Spain) RCD Espanyol	€4m
22 June 2011	(Spain) Fabricio Agosto	(Spain) Recreativo de Huelva	(Spain) Real Valladolid	Loan return
22 June 2011	(Spain) Fabricio Agosto	(Spain) Real Valladolid	(Spain) Real Betis	Free
22 June 2011	(Spain) Tomeu Nadal	(Spain) RCD Mallorca	(Spain) Getafe CF	Free
22 June 2011	(Spain) Óscar Ramírez	(Spain) CF Badalona	(Spain) CE Sabadell FC	Free
22 June 2011	(Spain) Ayoze Díaz	(Spain) RCD Mallorca	(Spain) Deportivo de La Coruña	Free
22 June 2011	(Spain) Rafel Sastre	(Spain) Sporting de Gijón	(Spain) SD Huesca	Free
23 June 2011	(Spain) Sergio Sánchez	(Spain) Sevilla FC	(Spain) Málaga CF	€2.8m
23 June 2011	(Spain) Raúl Cámara	(Spain) Recreativo de Huelva	(Spain) Xerez CD	Free
23 June 2011	(Spain) Joaquín	(Spain) Valencia CF	(Spain) Málaga CF	€4.2m
24 June 2011	(Spain) Natxo Insa	(Spain) Villarreal CF B	(Spain) Celta de Vigo	Free
24 June 2011	(Spain) Fran No	(Spain) Real Betis	(Spain) Real Valladolid	Free
24 June 2011	(Spain) Javier Flaño	(Spain) CD Numancia	(Spain) Elche CF	Free
25 June 2011	(France) Florent Sinama Pongolle	(Spain) Real Zaragoza	(Portugal) Sporting CP	Loan return
25 June 2011	(Ecuador) Jefferson Montero	(Spain) Levante UD	(Spain) Villarreal CF	Loan return
25 June 2011	(Ecuador) Jefferson Montero	(Spain) Villarreal CF	(Spain) Real Betis	Loan
26 June 2011	(Spain) Manolo Gaspar	(Spain) Málaga CF	(Spain) FC Cartagena	Free
26 June 2011	(Spain) Antonio Longás	(Spain) FC Cartagena	(Spain) Gimnàstic de Tarragona	Free
27 June 2011	(Spain) Javier Patiño	(Spain) UD San Sebastián de los Reyes	(Spain) Córdoba CF	Free
27 June 2011	(Spain) Manu Fernández	(Spain) Deportivo de La Coruña	(Spain) Recreativo de Huelva	Free
27 June 2011	(France) Raphaël Varane	(France) RC Lens	(Spain) Real Madrid	€10m
27 June 2011	(Spain) David de Gea	(Spain) Atlético Madrid	(England) Manchester United	€25m
27 June 2011	(Spain) Unai Expósito	(Spain) FC Cartagena	(Spain) CD Numancia	Free
27 June 2011	(Portugal) Diogo Salomão	(Portugal) Sporting CP	(Spain) Deportivo de La Coruña	Loan
27 June 2011	(Spain) Aritz Borda	(Spain) CD Mirandés	(Spain) Recreativo de Huelva	Free
28 June 2011	(Spain) Jesús Vázquez	(Spain) Recreativo de Huelva	(Spain) Deportivo de La Coruña	Free
29 June 2011	(Spain) Verza	(Spain) Albacete Balompié	(Spain) UD Almería	Free
29 June 2011	(Spain) Dani Castellano	(Spain) AD Ceuta	(Spain) UD Las Palmas	Free
29 June 2011	(Spain) Óscar Ramírez	(Spain) CF Badalona	(Spain) CE Sabadell FC	Free
29 June 2011	(Spain) Nico	(Spain) CD Guadalajara	(Spain) CD Tenerife	Free
29 June 2011	(Spain) Javi Castellano	(Spain) Real Unión	(Spain) RCD Mallorca	Loan return
29 June 2011	(Spain) Javi Castellano	(Spain) RCD Mallorca	(Spain) UD Las Palmas	Free
29 June 2011	(Spain) Israel	(Spain) Real Betis	(Spain) Xerez CD	Free
29 June 2011	(Italy) Michelangelo Albertazzi	(Italy) A.C. Milan	(Spain) Getafe CF	Loan
29 June 2011	(Spain) Sergi Enrich	(Spain) RCD Mallorca	(Spain) Recreativo de Huelva	Loan
30 June 2011	(Spain) David Miguélez	(Spain) UE Sant Andreu	(Spain) AD Alcorcón	Free
30 June 2011	(Serbia) Ranko Despotović	(Spain) Girona FC	(Japan) Urawa Red Diamonds	€0.7m
30 June 2011	(Spain) Diego Rivas	(Spain) Real Sociedad	(Spain) Hércules CF	Free
30 June 2011	(Brazil) Guilherme Siqueira	(Italy) Udinese Calcio	(Spain) Granada CF	Free
30 June 2011	(Spain) Dani Nieto	(Spain) RCD Espanyol	(Spain) Girona FC	Free
30 June 2011	(Spain) Samuel San José	(Spain) UD Las Palmas	(Spain) SD Ponferradina	Free
30 June 2011	(Spain) Rubén González	(Spain) RCD Mallorca	(Spain) CA Osasuna	Free
30 June 2011	(Spain) Cristian Lobato	(Spain) CE L'Hospitalet	(Spain) FC Barcelona B	Free
1 July 2011	(Spain) Míchel	(Spain) Deportivo de La Coruña	(Spain) Valencia CF	Loan return
1 July 2011	(Argentina) Germán Pacheco	(Argentina) Gimnasia La Plata	(Spain) Atlético Madrid	Loan return
1 July 2011	(Spain) Julen Goñi	(Spain) Barakaldo CF	(Spain) Athletic Bilbao	Loan return
1 July 2011	(Spain) Jorge Galán	(Spain) SD Huesca	(Spain) CA Osasuna	Loan return
1 July 2011	(Spain) Óscar Vega	(Spain) SD Huesca	(Spain) CA Osasuna	Loan return
1 July 2011	(Spain) Jokin Esparza	(Spain) SD Huesca	(Spain) CA Osasuna	Loan return
1 July 2011	(Spain) Xavi Torres	(Spain) Levante UD	(Spain) Málaga CF	Loan return
1 July 2011	(Spain) Iban Zubiaurre	(Spain) Albacete Balompié	(Spain) Athletic Bilbao	Loan return
1 July 2011	(Brazil) Keirrison	(Brazil) Santos FC	(Spain) FC Barcelona	Loan return
1 July 2011	(Spain) Jonathan Rosales	(Spain) CD Guijuelo	(Spain) Granada CF	Loan return
1 July 2011	(Spain) Andrés Fernández	(Spain) SD Huesca	(Spain) CA Osasuna	Loan return
1 July 2011	(Colombia) Marco Pérez	(Spain) Real Zaragoza	(Colombia) Boyacá Chicó	Loan return
1 July 2011	(Spain) Carlos Calvo	(Spain) Granada CF	(Italy) Udinese Calcio	Loan return
1 July 2011	(Spain) Javi López	(Spain) SD Ponferradina	(Spain) Málaga CF	Loan return
1 July 2011	(Brazil) Guilherme	(Spain) Real Valladolid	(Spain) UD Almería	Loan return
1 July 2011	(Argentina) Emiliano Armenteros	(Spain) Rayo Vallecano	(Spain) Sevilla FC	Loan return
1 July 2011	(Spain) Iñigo Sarasola	(Spain) Real Unión	(Spain) Real Sociedad	Loan return
1 July 2011	(Argentina) Matías Fritzler	(Spain) Hércules CF	(Argentina) Club Atlético Lanús	Loan return
1 July 2011	(Spain) Antonio Sánchez	(Spain) Albacete Balompié	(Spain) Real Betis	Loan return
1 July 2011	(Spain) Dani Benítez	(Spain) Granada CF	(Italy) Udinese Calcio	Loan return
1 July 2011	(Israel) Ben Sahar	(Israel) Hapoel Tel Aviv	(Spain) RCD Espanyol	Loan return
1 July 2011	(Serbia) Milan Smiljanic	(Serbia) FK Partizan	(Spain) RCD Espanyol	Loan return
1 July 2011	(Argentina) Mariano Pavone	(Argentina) River Plate	(Spain) Real Betis	Loan return
1 July 2011	(Spain) Iván Pérez	(Spain) SD Ponferradina	(Spain) Deportivo de La Coruña	Loan return
1 July 2011	(Brazil) Pedro Botelho	(Spain) FC Cartagena	(England) Arsenal	Loan return
1 July 2011	(Spain) Antonio Amaya	(Spain) Rayo Vallecano	(England) Wigan Athletic	Loan return
1 July 2011	(Spain) Isaac Cuenca	(Spain) CE Sabadell FC	(Spain) FC Barcelona B	Loan return
1 July 2011	(Spain) David Prieto	(Spain) CD Tenerife	(Spain) Sevilla FC	Loan return
1 July 2011	(Brazil) Henrique	(Spain) Racing de Santander	(Spain) FC Barcelona	Loan return
1 July 2011	(Ghana) Jonathan Mensah	(Spain) Granada CF	(Italy) Udinese Calcio	Loan return
1 July 2011	(Ghana) Aziz Tetteh	(Spain) CD Leganés	(Spain) Granada CF	Loan return
1 July 2011	(Uruguay) Christian Stuani	(Spain) Levante UD	(Italy) Reggina Calcio	Loan return
1 July 2011	(Spain) Iago Falqué	(Spain) Villarreal CF B	(Italy) Juventus FC	Loan return
1 July 2011	(Chile) Fabián Orellana	(Spain) Granada CF	(Italy) Udinese Calcio	Loan return
1 July 2011	(Colombia) Brayan Angulo	(Spain) Rayo Vallecano	(Portugal) Leixões S.C.	Loan return
1 July 2011	(Angola) Manucho	(Turkey) Manisaspor	(Spain) Real Valladolid	Loan return
1 July 2011	(Belgium) Tom De Mul	(Belgium) Standard Liège	(Spain) Sevilla FC	Loan return
1 July 2011	(Italy) Luca Cigarini	(Italy) S.S.C. Napoli	(Spain) Sevilla FC	Loan return
1 July 2011	(Argentina) Román Martínez	(Mexico) UANL Tigres	(Spain) RCD Espanyol	Loan return
1 July 2011	(Romania) Cristian Pulhac	(Spain) Hércules CF	(Romania) FC Dinamo București	Loan return
1 July 2011	(Spain) Jorge Molino	(Spain) Real Murcia	(Spain) Atlético Madrid	Loan return
1 July 2011	(Brazil) Bruno Perone	(Spain) Xerez CD	(Brazil) Figueirense	Loan return
1 July 2011	(Argentina) Nicolás Bertolo	(Spain) Real Zaragoza	(Italy) U.S. Palermo	Loan return
1 July 2011	(Spain) Iosu Esnaola	(Spain) Real Unión	(Spain) Real Sociedad	Loan return
1 July 2011	(Spain) Roberto Platero	(Spain) Polideportivo Ejido	(Spain) CD Numancia	Loan return
1 July 2011	(Argentina) Mauro Quiroga	(Spain) UD Las Palmas	(Argentina) Gimnasia de Concepción de Uruguay	Loan return
1 July 2011	(Spain) Asier Arranz	(Spain) CD Teruel	(Spain) CD Numancia	Loan return
1 July 2011	(Bolivia) Samuel Galindo	(Spain) Córdoba CF	(England) Arsenal	Loan return
1 July 2011	(Spain) Asier Arranz	(Spain) Pontevedra CF	(Spain) CD Numancia	Loan return
1 July 2011	(Uruguay) Leandro Cabrera	(Spain) Recreativo de Huelva	(Spain) Atlético Madrid	Loan return
1 July 2011	(Ghana) Quincy Owusu-Abeyie	(Spain) Málaga CF	(Qatar) Al-Sadd Sports Club	Loan return
1 July 2011	(Portugal) Tiago Mendes	(Spain) Atlético Madrid	(Italy) Juventus FC	Loan return
1 July 2011	(Spain) Jordi Pablo	(Spain) FC Cartagena	(Spain) Málaga CF	Loan return
1 July 2011	(Spain) Daniel Toribio	(Spain) SD Ponferradina	(Spain) Málaga CF	Loan return
1 July 2011	(Greece) Alexandros Tziolis	(Spain) Racing de Santander	(Italy) A.C. Siena	Loan return
1 July 2011	(Argentina) Eduardo Salvio	(Portugal) S.L. Benfica	(Spain) Atlético Madrid	Loan return
1 July 2011	(Brazil) Pablo Barros	(Brazil) Cruzeiro	(Spain) Real Zaragoza	Loan return
1 July 2011	(Japan) Hiroshi Ibusuki	(Spain) CE Sabadell FC	(Spain) Girona FC	Loan return
1 July 2011	(Spain) Asier del Horno	(Spain) Levante UD	(Spain) Valencia CF	Loan return
1 July 2011	(Spain) Aarón Ñíguez	(Spain) Recreativo de Huelva	(Spain) Valencia CF	Loan return
1 July 2011	(Spain) Jordi Figueras	(Spain) Real Valladolid	(Russia) FC Rubin Kazan	Loan return
1 July 2011	(Spain) Francis Suárez	(Spain) SD Ponferradina	(Spain) UD Las Palmas	Loan return
1 July 2011	(Brazil) Rovérsio	(Spain) Real Betis	(Spain) CA Osasuna	Loan return
1 July 2011	(Spain) Víctor Sánchez	(Spain) Getafe CF	(Spain) FC Barcelona	Loan return
1 July 2011	(Spain) Jonathan Ñíguez	(Spain) CD Mirandés	(Spain) UD Las Palmas	Loan return
1 July 2011	(Senegal) Ibrahima Baldé	(Spain) CD Numancia	(Spain) Atlético Madrid	Loan return
1 July 2011	(Spain) Marcos García	(Spain) Villarreal CF B	(Spain) Real Valladolid	Loan return
1 July 2011	(Spain) José Antonio Picón	(Spain) Pontevedra CF	(Spain) Racing de Santander	Loan return
1 July 2011	(Ivory Coast) Lago Júnior	(Spain) SD Eibar	(Spain) CD Numancia	Loan return
1 July 2011	(Spain) Biel Medina	(Cyprus) Anorthosis Famagusta FC	(Spain) Gimnàstic de Tarragona	Loan return
1 July 2011	(Equatorial Guinea) Rodolfo Bodipo	(Spain) Elche CF	(Spain) Deportivo de La Coruña	Loan return
1 July 2011	(Spain) Juanjo García	(Spain) Real Jaén	(Spain) Real Murcia	Loan return
1 July 2011	(Cape Verde) Nélson	(Spain) CA Osasuna	(Spain) Real Betis	Loan return
1 July 2011	(Spain) Héctor Font	(Spain) Xerez CD	(Spain) Real Valladolid	Loan return
1 July 2011	(Spain) Kiko Casilla	(Spain) FC Cartagena	(Spain) RCD Espanyol	Loan return
1 July 2011	(Spain) Cala	(Spain) FC Cartagena	(Spain) Sevilla FC	Loan return
1 July 2011	(Spain) Keko	(Spain) Girona FC	(Spain) Atlético Madrid	Loan return
1 July 2011	(Spain) Joseba del Olmo	(Spain) SD Ponferradina	(Spain) Hércules CF	Loan return
1 July 2011	(Spain) Mikel Rico	(Spain) Granada CF	(Italy) Udinese Calcio	Loan return
1 July 2011	(Spain) Ion Echaide	(Spain) SD Huesca	(Spain) CA Osasuna	Loan return
1 July 2011	(Spain) Raúl Goni	(Spain) Real Madrid Castilla	(Spain) Real Zaragoza	Loan return
1 July 2011	(Belarus) Alexander Hleb	(England) Birmingham City	(Spain) FC Barcelona	Loan return
1 July 2011	(Lithuania) Marius Stankevicius	(Spain) Valencia CF	(Italy) U.C. Sampdoria	Loan return
1 July 2011	(Spain) Alberto Bueno	(England) Derby County	(Spain) Real Valladolid	Loan return
1 July 2011	(Spain) David González	(Spain) Cádiz CF	(Spain) Málaga CF	Loan return
1 July 2011	(Netherlands) Royston Drenthe	(Spain) Hércules CF	(Spain) Real Madrid	Loan return
1 July 2011	(Bosnia and Herzegovina) Eldin Hadžić	(Spain) Orihuela CF	(Spain) Hércules CF	Loan return
1 July 2011	(Sweden) Markus Rosenberg	(Spain) Racing de Santander	(Germany) SV Werder Bremen	Loan return
1 July 2011	(Portugal) Miguel Lopes	(Spain) Real Betis	(Portugal) F.C. Porto	Loan return
1 July 2011	(Spain) Juan Quero	(Spain) UD Las Palmas	(Spain) Rayo Vallecano	Loan return
1 July 2011	(Portugal) Manuel Fernandes	(Turkey) Beşiktaş J.K.	(Spain) Valencia CF	Loan return
1 July 2011	(Spain) Pedro Barrancos	(Spain) UD Logroñés	(Spain) Granada CF	Loan return
1 July 2011	(Nigeria) Odion Ighalo	(Spain) Granada CF	(Italy) Udinese Calcio	Loan return
1 July 2011	(Spain) Sergio Asenjo	(Spain) Málaga CF	(Spain) Atlético Madrid	Loan return
1 July 2011	(Spain) Edu Bedia	(Spain) UD Salamanca	(Spain) Racing de Santander	Loan return
1 July 2011	(France) Adil Rami	(France) Lille OSC	(Spain) Valencia CF	Loan return
1 July 2011	(Uruguay) Matías Alonso	(Uruguay) C.A. Cerro	(Spain) Granada CF	Loan return
1 July 2011	(Spain) Edu Ramos	(Spain) CD Leganés	(Spain) Málaga CF	Loan return
1 July 2011	(Spain) Martí Riverola	(Netherlands) Vitesse Arnhem	(Spain) FC Barcelona B	Loan return
1 July 2011	(Argentina) Leandro Gioda	(Spain) Xerez CD	(Argentina) C.A. Independiente	Loan return
1 July 2011	(Spain) Álex Bergantiños	(Spain) Gimnàstic de Tarragona	(Spain) Deportivo de La Coruña	Loan return
1 July 2011	(Spain) Borja Viguera	(Spain) Gimnàstic de Tarragona	(Spain) Real Sociedad	Loan return
1 July 2011	(Portugal) André Castro	(Spain) Sporting de Gijón	(Portugal) F.C. Porto	Loan return
1 July 2011	(Spain) Víctor Ibáñez	(Spain) SD Eibar	(Spain) RCD Espanyol	Loan return
1 July 2011	(Brazil) Wellington Silva	(Spain) Levante UD	(England) Arsenal	Loan return
1 July 2011	(Brazil) Cicinho	(Spain) Villarreal CF	(Italy) A.S. Roma	Loan return
1 July 2011	(Argentina) Diego Buonanotte	(Argentina) River Plate	(Spain) Málaga CF	Loan return
1 July 2011	(Portugal) Fábio Faria	(Spain) Real Valladolid	(Portugal) S.L. Benfica	Loan return
1 July 2011	(Spain) Ferran Corominas	(Spain) CA Osasuna	(Spain) RCD Espanyol	Loan return
1 July 2011	(Spain) Marc Mateu	(Spain) CD Badajoz	(Spain) Levante UD	Loan return
1 July 2011	(Spain) Toni Rodríguez	(Spain) SD Huesca	(Spain) Celta de Vigo	Loan return
1 July 2011	(Brazil) Renan Brito	(Brazil) Sport Club Internacional	(Spain) Valencia CF	Loan return
1 July 2011	(Nigeria) Sunny	(Spain) CD Numancia	(Spain) Valencia CF	Loan return
1 July 2011	(Spain) Ion Vélez	(Spain) CD Numancia	(Spain) Athletic Bilbao	Loan return
1 July 2011	(Paraguay) Javier Acuña	(Spain) Recreativo de Huelva	(Spain) Real Madrid Castilla	Loan return
1 July 2011	(Spain) Antonio Luna	(Spain) UD Almería	(Spain) Sevilla FC	Loan return
1 July 2011	(Spain) Marcos Landeira	(Spain) Real Unión	(Spain) Sporting de Gijón	Loan return
1 July 2011	(Spain) Tuni	(Spain) Gimnàstic de Tarragona	(Spain) RCD Mallorca	Loan return
1 July 2011	(Senegal) Guirane N'Daw	(Spain) Real Zaragoza	(France) AS Saint-Étienne	Loan return
1 July 2011	(Spain) Juanjo Ciércoles	(Spain) CE Sabadell FC	(Spain) RCD Espanyol B	Loan return
1 July 2011	(Togo) Emmanuel Adebayor	(Spain) Real Madrid	(England) Manchester City	Loan return
1 July 2011	(Spain) Miguel Ángel Nieto	(Spain) Xerez CD	(Spain) UD Almería	Loan return
1 July 2011	(Spain) Juan Domínguez	(Spain) SD Eibar	(Spain) Gimnàstic de Tarragona	Loan return
1 July 2011	(Serbia) Marko Lukić	(Spain) CD La Muela	(Spain) SD Huesca	Loan return
1 July 2011	(France) Sofiane Feghouli	(Spain) UD Almería	(Spain) Valencia CF	Loan return
1 July 2011	(France) Allan Nyom	(Spain) Granada CF	(Italy) Udinese Calcio	Loan return
1 July 2011	(Spain) Abraham González	(Spain) SD Ponferradina	(Spain) Gimnàstic de Tarragona	Loan return
1 July 2011	(Spain) Juande	(Spain) Granada CF	(Spain) Real Betis	Loan return
1 July 2011	(Spain) Miguel Ángel Riau	(Spain) FC Cartagena	(Spain) Valencia CF Mestalla	Loan return
1 July 2011	(Portugal) Edinho	(Portugal) C.S. Marítimo	(Spain) Málaga CF	Loan return
1 July 2011	(Spain) Ton Vela	(Spain) CD Badajoz	(Spain) Villarreal CF	Loan return
1 July 2011	(Argentina) José Sand	(Spain) Deportivo de La Coruña	(United Arab Emirates) Al Ain S.C.C.	Loan return
1 July 2011	(Spain) Xisco	(Spain) Deportivo de La Coruña	(England) Newcastle United	Loan return
1 July 2011	(Spain) Javito	(Spain) Deportivo de La Coruña	(Greece) Aris Thessaloniki	Loan return
1 July 2011	(Spain) David Mateos	(Greece) AEK Athens	(Spain) Real Madrid	Loan return
1 July 2011	(Spain) Diego Antón	(Spain) Peña Sport FC	(Spain) CD Numancia	Loan return
1 July 2011	(Spain) Rodri	(Spain) FC Cartagena	(Spain) Real Betis	Loan return
1 July 2011	(Spain) José Carlos	(Spain) FC Cartagena	(Spain) Sevilla FC	Loan return
1 July 2011	(Spain) Felipe Sanchón	(Spain) Gimnàstic de Tarragona	(Italy) Udinese	Loan return
1 July 2011	(Spain) Ander Herrera	(Spain) Real Zaragoza	(Spain) Athletic Bilbao	Loan return
1 July 2011	(Mexico) Giovani dos Santos	(Spain) Racing de Santander	(England) Tottenham Hotspur	Loan return
1 July 2011	(Senegal) César Diop	(Spain) Lorca Atlético CF	(Spain) Gimnàstic de Tarragona	Loan return
1 July 2011	(United States) Jozy Altidore	(Turkey) Bursaspor	(Spain) Villarreal CF	Loan return
1 July 2011	(Spain) Iñigo Pérez	(Spain) SD Huesca	(Spain) Athletic Bilbao	Loan return
1 July 2011	(Spain) Cristóbal Márquez	(Spain) Elche CF	(Spain) Villarreal CF	Loan return
1 July 2011	(Spain) David Mateos	(Spain) Real Madrid	(Spain) Real Zaragoza	Loan
1 July 2011	(Spain) Josemi	(Greece) Iraklis	(Spain) FC Cartagena	Free
1 July 2011	(Spain) Roberto Peragón	(Spain) Girona FC	(Spain) Gimnàstic de Tarragona	Free
1 July 2011	(Spain) Francisco Molinero	(Spain) SD Huesca	(Spain) Real Murcia	Free
1 July 2011	(Portugal) Manuel Fernandes	(Spain) Valencia CF	(Turkey) Beşiktaş J.K.	€2m
1 July 2011	(Spain) Gaizka Saizar	(Spain) SD Ponferradina	(Spain) Girona FC	Free
2 July 2011	(Costa Rica) Keylor Navas	(Spain) Albacete Balompié	(Spain) Levante UD	Loan
2 July 2011	(Spain) Víctor Sánchez	(Spain) FC Barcelona	(Switzerland) Neuchâtel Xamax	Free
2 July 2011	(Spain) Mikel Orbegozo	(Spain) Real Sociedad	(Spain) Athletic Bilbao	Free
2 July 2011	(Spain) Juanma Barrero	(Greece) Aris Thessaloniki	(Spain) FC Cartagena	Free
2 July 2011	(Israel) Ben Sahar	(Spain) RCD Espanyol	(France) AJ Auxerre	Loan
3 July 2011	(Spain) Salva Chamorro	(Spain) Villarreal CF	(Spain) FC Cartagena	Loan
3 July 2011	(Spain) Pablo Sarabia	(Spain) Real Madrid	(Spain) Getafe CF	€3m
3 July 2011	(Spain) Marc Fernández	(Spain) CE Sabadell FC	(Spain) FC Cartagena	Free
3 July 2011	(Spain) Fernando Usero	(Spain) Córdoba CF	(Spain) Elche CF	Free
3 July 2011	(Argentina) Matías Lequi	(Spain) UD Las Palmas	(Argentina) Rosario Central	Free
4 July 2011	(Spain) Luismi Loro	(Spain) CD Castellón	(Spain) Elche CF	Free
4 July 2011	(Spain) Samuel Baños	(Spain) AD Alcorcón	(Spain) CE Sabadell FC	Free
4 July 2011	(Bosnia and Herzegovina) Emir Spahić	(France) Montpellier HSC	(Spain) Sevilla FC	€2m
4 July 2011	(Spain) Juanmi Callejón	(Spain) Córdoba CF	(Spain) Hércules CF	Free
4 July 2011	(Spain) Juan Carlos Martín	(Spain) Rayo Vallecano B	(Spain) Hércules CF	Free
5 July 2011	(Spain) Alejandro Zamora	(Spain) UD Salamanca	(Spain) Recreativo de Huelva	Free
5 July 2011	(Spain) José Carlos	(Spain) Sevilla FC	(Greece) AEK Athens	Free
5 July 2011	(Spain) Cala	(Spain) Sevilla FC	(Greece) AEK Athens	Loan
5 July 2011	(Spain) Manolo Lanzarote	(Spain) SD Eibar	(Spain) CE Sabadell FC	Free
5 July 2011	(Spain) Samuel Llorca	(Spain) Elche CF	(Spain) Hércules CF	Free
5 July 2011	(Portugal) Fábio Coentrão	(Portugal) S.L. Benfica	(Spain) Real Madrid	€30m
5 July 2011	(Argentina) Ezequiel Garay	(Spain) Real Madrid	(Portugal) S.L. Benfica	€5.5m
5 July 2011	(Spain) David Navarro	(Spain) Valencia CF	(Switzerland) Neuchâtel Xamax	Free
5 July 2011	(Spain) Juan Calatayud	(Spain) Hércules CF	(Spain) RCD Mallorca	Free
5 July 2011	(Argentina) Pablo Piatti	(Spain) UD Almería	(Spain) Valencia CF	€8m
5 July 2011	(Spain) Pepe Mora	(Spain) Recreativo de Huelva	(Spain) Hércules CF	Free
5 July 2011	(Spain) Josetxo	(Spain) CA Osasuna	(Spain) SD Huesca	Free
6 July 2011	(Spain) Sergio Díaz	(Spain) Atlético Malagueño	(Spain) Hércules CF	Loan
6 July 2011	(Spain) Perico	(Spain) UD Salamanca	(Spain) Elche CF	Free
6 July 2011	(Spain) Víctor Fernández	(Spain) FC Cartagena	(Spain) CD Leganés	Free
6 July 2011	(Spain) Juanma Ortiz	(Spain) UD Almería	(Scotland) Rangers F.C.	Free
6 July 2011	(Spain) Kiko Femenía	(Spain) Hércules CF	(Spain) FC Barcelona B	€2m
6 July 2011	(Spain) Cristian García	(Spain) SD Ponferradina	(Spain) Córdoba CF	Free
6 July 2011	(Spain) Borja García	(Spain) Rayo Vallecano	(Spain) Córdoba CF	Free
6 July 2011	(Spain) Bernardo Domínguez	(Spain) Recreativo de Huelva	(Spain) SD Huesca	Free
7 July 2011	(Spain) Juan Carlos Pérez	(Spain) Real Madrid	(Portugal) S.C. Braga	€2.5m
7 July 2011	(Spain) Juan Carlos Pérez	(Portugal) S.C. Braga	(Spain) Real Zaragoza	Loan
7 July 2011	(Colombia) Cristián Zapata	(Italy) Udinese Calcio	(Spain) Villarreal CF	€7m
7 July 2011	(France) Florian Lejeune	(France) FC Istres	(Spain) Villarreal CF B	€1m
7 July 2011	(Spain) Abraham Paz	(Spain) Hércules CF	(Spain) FC Cartagena	Free
7 July 2011	(Spain) Jesús Olmo	(Spain) CD Puertollano	(Spain) CE Sabadell FC	Free
7 July 2011	(Spain) Baltasar Rigo	(Spain) SD Huesca	(Spain) Girona FC	Free
7 July 2011	(Spain) Fran Carnicer	(Spain) Real Jaén	(Spain) CA Osasuna	Free
7 July 2011	(Spain) Míchel	(Spain) Valencia CF	(Spain) Hércules CF	Loan
7 July 2011	(Spain) Carlos Expósito	(Spain) Real Madrid C	(Spain) AD Alcorcón	Free
7 July 2011	(Spain) Manu Molina	(Spain) RCD Espanyol	(Spain) SD Huesca	Loan
7 July 2011	(Spain) David Valle	(Spain) CF Badalona	(Spain) Gimnàstic de Tarragona	Free
8 July 2011	(Ecuador) Felipe Caicedo	(Spain) Levante UD	(Russia) FC Lokomotiv Moscow	€7.5m
8 July 2011	(Spain) Dani Aquino	(Spain) Real Murcia	(Spain) Real Valladolid	Free
8 July 2011	(Spain) Jaime Jiménez	(Spain) Elche CF	(Spain) Real Valladolid	Free
8 July 2011	(Portugal) Afonso Taira	(Portugal) Sporting CP	(Spain) Córdoba CF	Free
8 July 2011	(Uruguay) Pablo Cáceres	(Argentina) CA Tigre	(Spain) RCD Mallorca	Free
8 July 2011	(Spain) Vicente Pérez	(Spain) Gimnàstic de Tarragona	(Spain) CD Leganés	Free
8 July 2011	(Spain) Iñigo Vélez	(Spain) CD Numancia	(Spain) Xerez CD	Free
8 July 2011	(Spain) Javi López	(Spain) Málaga CF	(Spain) Real Jaén	Loan
8 July 2011	(Uruguay) Robert Flores	(Spain) Villarreal CF B	(Bulgaria) PFC Litex Lovech	Free
8 July 2011	(Spain) Iriome González	(Spain) CD Tenerife	(Spain) Villarreal CF B	Free
8 July 2011	(Spain) Guille Roldán	(Spain) UD Melilla	(Spain) CD Alcoyano	Free
9 July 2011	(Spain) Isco	(Spain) Valencia CF	(Spain) Málaga CF	€6m
9 July 2011	(Argentina) Marco Torsiglieri	(Portugal) Sporting CP	(Spain) Rayo Vallecano	Loan
9 July 2011	(Spain) Carlos Quesada	(Spain) CD Guadalajara	(Spain) CD Atlético Baleares	Free
9 July 2011	(Spain) Dani Bautista	(Spain) Girona FC	(Spain) UD Almería	Free
9 July 2011	(Spain) Juan Francisco Góngora	(Spain) Real Murcia	(Spain) Cádiz CF	Free
9 July 2011	(Spain) Jaime Romero	(Italy) Udinese Calcio	(Spain) Granada CF	Loan
9 July 2011	(Portugal) Lassana Camará	(Portugal) S.L. Benfica	(Spain) Real Valladolid	Free
9 July 2011	(Spain) Oier Sanjurjo	(Spain) CA Osasuna	(Spain) Celta de Vigo	Loan
10 July 2011	(Brazil) Wellington Silva	(England) Arsenal	(Spain) Levante UD	Loan
10 July 2011	(Netherlands) Gianni Zuiverloon	(England) West Bromwich Albion	(Spain) RCD Mallorca	Free
11 July 2011	(Spain) Oriol Riera	(Spain) Córdoba CF	(Spain) AD Alcorcón	Free
11 July 2011	(Spain) Ismael Falcón	(Spain) Celta de Vigo	(Spain) Hércules CF	Free
11 July 2011	(Spain) David Cortés	(Spain) Hércules CF	(Spain) Granada CF	Free
11 July 2011	(Spain) Cristóbal Márquez	(Spain) Villarreal CF	(Ukraine) FC Karpaty Lviv	Free
11 July 2011	(Spain) Edu Ramos	(Spain) Málaga CF	(Spain) Villarreal CF B	Free
11 July 2011	(Spain) Jorge Morcillo	(Spain) Deportivo Alavés	(Spain) CD Alcoyano	Free
11 July 2011	(Venezuela) Juan Guerra	(Venezuela) Caracas FC	(Spain) UD Las Palmas	Loan
12 July 2011	(Spain) Antonio Cañadas	(Spain) Polideportivo Ejido	(Spain) CD Alcoyano	Free
12 July 2011	(France) Samuel Camille	(Spain) Córdoba CF	(Spain) Cádiz CF	Free
12 July 2011	(Spain) Alberto Perea	(Spain) Atlético Madrid B	(Spain) Rayo Vallecano	Free
12 July 2011	(Spain) Aarón Ñíguez	(Spain) Valencia CF	(Spain) UD Almería	Free
12 July 2011	(Argentina) Germán Pacheco	(Spain) Atlético Madrid	(Ukraine) FC Karpaty Lviv	Free
12 July 2011	(Paraguay) Javier Acuña	(Spain) Real Madrid Castilla	(Spain) Girona FC	Loan
12 July 2011	(Brazil) Renan Brito	(Spain) Valencia CF	(Brazil) Sport Club Internacional	Free
12 July 2011	(Argentina) Diego Herner	(Argentina) San Lorenzo de Almagro	(Spain) UD Las Palmas	Free
12 July 2011	(Spain) Oriol Lozano	(Greece) Aris Thessaloniki	(Spain) Real Murcia	Free
13 July 2011	(Spain) Rafa Gómez	(Spain) Elche CF	(Spain) CD Alcoyano	Free
13 July 2011	(Spain) Miguel Ángel Sáiz	(Spain) Racing de Santander B	(Spain) FC Barcelona B	€6m
13 July 2011	(Spain) Emilio Sánchez	(Spain) Recreativo de Huelva	(Spain) Real Murcia	Free
13 July 2011	(Scotland) Ikechi Anya	(Spain) Celta de Vigo	(Spain) Granada CF	Free
13 July 2011	(Spain) Miki	(Spain) Gimnàstic de Tarragona	(Spain) CD Alcoyano	Free
13 July 2011	(Spain) Javi Álamo	(Spain) Real Unión	(Spain) Recreativo de Huelva	Free
13 July 2011	(Spain) Pedro Barrancos	(Spain) Granada CF	(Spain) Cádiz CF	Loan
13 July 2011	(Spain) David González	(Spain) Málaga CF	(Spain) Real Oviedo Vetusta	Free
13 July 2011	(Nigeria) Sunny	(Spain) Valencia CF	(Spain) CD Numancia	Free
13 July 2011	(Spain) Juanjo Expósito	(Spain) UD Salamanca	(Spain) CD Numancia	Free
14 July 2011	(United Arab Emirates) Tariq Spezie	(Italy) Udinese Calcio	(Spain) SD Huesca	Free
14 July 2011	(Brazil) Gilvan Gomes	(Spain) SD Huesca	(Spain) Hércules CF	€0.6m
14 July 2011	(Spain) Víctor Pérez	(Spain) SD Huesca	(Spain) Real Valladolid	Free
14 July 2011	(Spain) Juan Carlos Sánchez	(Spain) Villarreal CF	(Spain) Elche CF	Loan
14 July 2011	(Argentina) Alejandro Domínguez	(Spain) Valencia CF	(Argentina) River Plate	Loan
14 July 2011	(Spain) Dani Benítez	(Italy) Udinese Calcio	(Spain) Granada CF	Loan
14 July 2011	(Spain) Urzaiz	(Spain) Real Murcia	(Spain) SD Ponferradina	Free
14 July 2011	(Portugal) Rui Fonte	(Portugal) Sporting CP	(Spain) RCD Espanyol	Loan
14 July 2011	(Spain) Benja	(Spain) FC Barcelona B	(Spain) Girona FC	Free
14 July 2011	(Spain) Juanlu Hens	(Spain) CD Tenerife	(Spain) Girona FC	Free
15 July 2011	(Equatorial Guinea) Iván Bolado	(Spain) Racing de Santander	(Spain) FC Cartagena	Free
15 July 2011	(Spain) Marcos Cerrudo	(Spain) CD Guadalajara	(Spain) RSD Alcalá	Free
15 July 2011	(Spain) Cristian Fernández	(Spain) Albacete Balompié	(Spain) CD Guadalajara	Free
15 July 2011	(United States) Jozy Altidore	(Spain) Villarreal CF	(Netherlands) AZ Alkmaar	Free
15 July 2011	(Spain) Abraham González	(Spain) Gimnàstic de Tarragona	(Spain) AD Alcorcón	Free
15 July 2011	(Brazil) Henrique	(Spain) FC Barcelona	(Brazil) Palmeiras	Loan
16 July 2011	(Spain) Toché	(Spain) FC Cartagena	(Greece) Panathinaikos	€1.5m
16 July 2011	(Spain) Julián Robles	(Spain) CE Sabadell FC	(Spain) CF Badalona	Free
16 July 2011	(Spain) Javi Martínez	(Spain) Sevilla Atlético	(Spain) SD Huesca	Free
16 July 2011	(Spain) Sendoa Aguirre	(Spain) Hércules CF	(Spain) Deportivo Alavés	Free
17 July 2011	(Spain) Antonio Amaya	(England) Wigan Athletic	(Spain) Real Betis	Free
17 July 2011	(Nigeria) Kabiru Akinsola	(Spain) UD Salamanca	(Spain) Granada CF	Free
17 July 2011	(Nigeria) Kabiru Akinsola	(Spain) Granada CF	(Spain) Cádiz CF	Loan
17 July 2011	(Spain) Abraham Quesada	(Spain) Real Murcia	(Spain) CD Atlético Baleares	Free
18 July 2011	(Spain) Ian Mackay	(Spain) SD Ponferradina	(Spain) CE Sabadell FC	Free
18 July 2011	(Spain) Joseba Arriaga	(Spain) AD Ceuta	(Spain) CD Guadalajara	Free
18 July 2011	(Spain) Víctor Curto	(Spain) Girona FC	(Spain) Albacete Balompié	Free
18 July 2011	(Spain) Álvaro Antón	(Spain) Real Valladolid	(Spain) FC Cartagena	Free
18 July 2011	(Spain) Miguel Ángel Nieto	(Spain) UD Almería	(Spain) CD Numancia	Free
18 July 2011	(Spain) Adrián López	(Spain) Deportivo de La Coruña	(Spain) Atlético Madrid	Free
19 July 2011	(Paraguay) Justo Villar	(Spain) Real Valladolid	(Argentina) Estudiantes de La Plata	Free
19 July 2011	(Spain) Alberto Manga	(Spain) CE Sabadell FC	(Spain) CF Badalona	Free
19 July 2011	(Spain) Diego Capel	(Spain) Sevilla FC	(Portugal) Sporting CP	€4m
19 July 2011	(Spain) Javier Camuñas	(Spain) CA Osasuna	(Spain) Villarreal CF	€2.3m
19 July 2011	(Spain) José Ángel	(Spain) Sporting de Gijón	(Italy) A.S. Roma	€4.5m
19 July 2011	(Spain) Carlos Aranda	(Spain) CA Osasuna	(Spain) Levante UD	Free
19 July 2011	(Spain) Ander Gago	(Spain) Real Murcia	(Spain) CD Guadalajara	Free
19 July 2011	(Spain) Jonan García	(Spain) Écija Balompié	(Spain) CD Guadalajara	Free
19 July 2011	(Spain) Pedro López	(Spain) Real Valladolid	(Spain) Levante UD	Free
19 July 2011	(Brazil) Sandro Silva	(Spain) Málaga CF	(Brazil) Sport Club Internacional	Loan
19 July 2011	(Spain) Xavi Torres	(Spain) Málaga CF	(Spain) Levante UD	Loan
20 July 2011	(Spain) Kiko Ratón	(Spain) Girona FC	(Spain) CD Tenerife	Free
20 July 2011	(Spain) Keko	(Spain) Atlético Madrid	(Italy) Calcio Catania	Free
20 July 2011	(Portugal) Tiago Mendes	(Italy) Juventus FC	(Spain) Atlético Madrid	Free
20 July 2011	(Spain) Eladio Fernández	(Spain) AD Alcorcón	(Spain) CD Badajoz	Free
20 July 2011	(Spain) Gorka Larrea	(Spain) Levante UD	(Spain) CD Numancia	Free
20 July 2011	(Spain) Diego de Miguel	(Spain) CD Numancia	(Spain) CF Palencia	Free
20 July 2011	(Spain) Miguel Torres	(Spain) FC Cartagena	(Spain) RSD Alcalá	Free
20 July 2011	(Uruguay) Sebastián Balsas	(Uruguay) Racing Montevideo	(Spain) Córdoba CF	Loan
20 July 2011	(Nigeria) Odion Ighalo	(Italy) Udinese Calcio	(Spain) Granada CF	Loan
21 July 2011	(Spain) Javi González	(Spain) Valencia CF Mestalla	(Spain) CD Guadalajara	Free
21 July 2011	(Spain) Álvaro Silva	(Spain) Cádiz CF	(Spain) Xerez CD	Free
21 July 2011	(Uruguay) Nacho González	(Spain) Valencia CF	(Belgium) Standard Liège	Free
21 July 2011	(Spain) David Arteaga	(Spain) Córdoba CF	(Spain) CE Sabadell FC	Free
21 July 2011	(Spain) Pablo Gallardo	(Spain) Recreativo de Huelva	(Spain) Deportivo Alavés	Free
21 July 2011	(Chile) Alexis Sánchez	(Italy) Udinese Calcio	(Spain) FC Barcelona	€37.5m
21 July 2011	(Japan) Hiroshi Ibusuki	(Spain) Girona FC	(Spain) Sevilla FC	€0.15m
21 July 2011	(Spain) Daniel Cifuentes	(Spain) Cádiz CF	(Spain) Recreativo de Huelva	Free
21 July 2011	(Spain) Chico	(Italy) Genoa C.F.C.	(Spain) RCD Mallorca	Loan
21 July 2011	(Spain) Joan Capdevila	(Spain) Villarreal CF	(Portugal) S.L. Benfica	Free
22 July 2011	(Spain) Bojan Krkić	(Spain) FC Barcelona	(Italy) A.S. Roma	€12m
22 July 2011	(Spain) Alejandro Rebollo	(Spain) FC Cartagena	(Spain) Real Oviedo	Free
22 July 2011	(Spain) Juanjo Serrano	(Spain) CD Guadalajara	(Spain) Granada CF	Free
22 July 2011	(Spain) Juanjo Serrano	(Spain) Granada CF	(Spain) Cádiz CF	Loan
22 July 2011	(Belgium) Thibaut Courtois	(England) Chelsea	(Spain) Atlético Madrid	Loan
22 July 2011	(Spain) Paco Borrego	(Cyprus) Doxa Katokopias	(Spain) Elche CF	Free
22 July 2011	(Brazil) Rodrigo Galatto	(Spain) Málaga CF	(Switzerland) Neuchâtel Xamax	Free
22 July 2011	(Spain) Nino Ibarra	(Spain) AD Alcorcón	(Spain) Real Jaén	Free
22 July 2011	(Spain) Igor Angulo	(Spain) CD Numancia	(Spain) Real Unión	Free
23 July 2011	(Spain) Francisco Lledó	(Spain) Xerez CD	(Spain) Real Oviedo	Free
23 July 2011	(Spain) Oriol Romeu	(Spain) FC Barcelona	(England) Chelsea	€5.1m
23 July 2011	(France) Noé Pamarot	(Spain) Hércules CF	(Spain) Granada CF	Free
23 July 2011	(Spain) Ion Vélez	(Spain) Athletic Bilbao	(Spain) Girona FC	Free
23 July 2011	(Spain) Cerra	(Spain) Levante UD	(Spain) Córdoba CF	Free
23 July 2011	(Argentina) Germán Lux	(Spain) RCD Mallorca	(Spain) Deportivo de La Coruña	Free
23 July 2011	(Spain) Jorge Luque	(Spain) Córdoba CF	(Spain) Elche CF	Free
24 July 2011	(Spain) Gerardo Carrera	(Spain) AD Alcorcón	(Spain) CD Teruel	Free
24 July 2011	(Spain) Albert Serra	(Spain) Girona FC	(Spain) UE Olot	Free
24 July 2011	(Portugal) Cristiano Pereira	(Portugal) S.C. Braga	(Spain) Valencia CF	Free
24 July 2011	(Spain) Antoñito	(Spain) Xerez CD	(Spain) CD Atlético Baleares	Free
24 July 2011	(Spain) Aarón Bueno	(Spain) Cádiz CF	(Spain) CE Sabadell FC	Free
25 July 2011	(Spain) Víctor Fernández	(Spain) Celta de Vigo B	(Spain) CD Guadalajara	Free
25 July 2011	(Spain) Fernando Soriano	(Spain) CA Osasuna	(Spain) UD Almería	Free
25 July 2011	(Spain) Santi Cazorla	(Spain) Villarreal CF	(Spain) Málaga CF	€19m
25 July 2011	(Spain) Álex Cruz	(Spain) Granada CF	(Spain) CE Sabadell FC	Loan
25 July 2011	(Spain) Óscar Pérez	(Spain) Granada CF	(Spain) Cádiz CF	Loan
25 July 2011	(Spain) Ángel Martínez	(Spain) RCD Espanyol	(England) Blackpool	Free
25 July 2011	(Spain) Mikel Azparren	(Spain) CE Sabadell FC	(Spain) Lleida Esportiu	Free
25 July 2011	(Spain) Manuel Redondo	(Spain) SD Ponferradina	(Spain) CE Sabadell FC	Free
25 July 2011	(Spain) David Prieto	(Spain) Sevilla FC	(Spain) Córdoba CF	Free
26 July 2011	(Portugal) Júlio Alves	(Portugal) Rio Ave F.C.	(Spain) Atlético Madrid	Free
26 July 2011	(Mexico) Efraín Juárez	(Scotland) Celtic F.C.	(Spain) Real Zaragoza	Loan
26 July 2011	(Spain) David Medina	(Spain) Gimnàstic de Tarragona	(Spain) CD Tenerife	Free
26 July 2011	(Argentina) Lautaro Acosta	(Spain) Sevilla FC	(Spain) Racing de Santander	Loan
26 July 2011	(Spain) Héctor Font	(Spain) Real Valladolid	(Spain) Recreativo de Huelva	Free
27 July 2011	(Portugal) Bruno Gama	(Portugal) Rio Ave F.C.	(Spain) Deportivo de La Coruña	Free
27 July 2011	(Argentina) Sergio Agüero	(Spain) Atlético Madrid	(England) Manchester City	€45m
27 July 2011	(Spain) Rubén Párraga	(Spain) Granada CF	(Spain) Real Murcia	Free
27 July 2011	(Spain) Michu	(Spain) Celta de Vigo	(Spain) Rayo Vallecano	Free
27 July 2011	(Spain) José Moragón	(Spain) Gimnàstic de Tarragona	(Spain) CE L'Hospitalet	Free
27 July 2011	(Spain) Enrique Corrales	(Spain) RCD Mallorca	(Spain) Granada CF	Free
28 July 2011	(Finland) Jukka Raitala	(Germany) TSG 1899 Hoffenheim	(Spain) CA Osasuna	Loan
28 July 2011	(Spain) Iván Malón	(Spain) Deportivo Alavés	(Spain) CD Numancia	Free
28 July 2011	(Spain) Dani López	(Spain) CD Numancia	(Spain) Deportivo Alavés	Free
28 July 2011	(Spain) Rafita	(Spain) Recreativo de Huelva	(Spain) UD Almería	Free
28 July 2011	(Spain) Juanjo Ciércoles	(Spain) RCD Espanyol B	(Spain) CE Sabadell FC	Free
28 July 2011	(Spain) Jesús Perera	(Spain) Elche CF	(Spain) CD Atlético Baleares	Free
29 July 2011	(Colombia) Edixon Perea	(Spain) UD Las Palmas	(Mexico) Cruz Azul	Free
29 July 2011	(Spain) Sergio Díaz	(Spain) Gimnàstic de Tarragona	(Spain) Hércules CF	Free
29 July 2011	(France) Yohan Mollo	(France) AS Monaco	(Spain) Granada CF	€1m
29 July 2011	(Argentina) Hernán Pellerano	(Spain) UD Almería	(Argentina) Newell's Old Boys	Loan
29 July 2011	(Cameroon) Pierre Webó	(Spain) RCD Mallorca	(Turkey) Eskişehirspor	€1.25m
30 July 2011	(Spain) Sergio Canales	(Spain) Real Madrid	(Spain) Valencia CF	Loan
30 July 2011	(Spain) Toti	(Spain) UD Salamanca	(Spain) Granada CF	Free
30 July 2011	(Spain) Toti	(Spain) Granada CF	(Spain) Cádiz CF	Loan
1 August 2011	(Brazil) William Soares	(Portugal) F.C. Porto	(Spain) Recreativo de Huelva	Loan
1 August 2011	(Spain) Francisco Sutil	(Spain) Real Sociedad	(Spain) Real Murcia	Free
1 August 2011	(Spain) Roberto Jiménez	(Portugal) S.L. Benfica	(Spain) Real Zaragoza	€8.6m
1 August 2011	(Spain) Jeffrén Suárez	(Spain) FC Barcelona	(Portugal) Sporting CP	€5m
2 August 2011	(Spain) David Ferreiro	(Spain) Zamora CF	(Spain) Granada CF	Free
2 August 2011	(Spain) David Ferreiro	(Spain) Granada CF	(Spain) Cádiz CF	Loan
2 August 2011	(Spain) Kike López	(Spain) UD Salamanca	(Spain) Villarreal CF B	Free
2 August 2011	(Ecuador) Fernando Guerrero	(Ecuador) Independiente José Terán	(Spain) Villarreal CF B	Loan
2 August 2011	(Bolivia) Samuel Galindo	(England) Arsenal	(Spain) Gimnàstic de Tarragona	Loan
2 August 2011	(Spain) Asier del Horno	(Spain) Valencia CF	(Spain) Levante UD	Free
2 August 2011	(Spain) Javier Portillo	(Spain) Hércules CF	(Spain) UD Las Palmas	Free
2 August 2011	(Spain) Jonathan Ñíguez	(Spain) UD Las Palmas	(Spain) CD Guadalajara	Free
3 August 2011	(Spain) Yuma	(Spain) Rayo Vallecano	(Spain) UD Salamanca	Free
3 August 2011	(France) Allan Nyom	(Italy) Udinese Calcio	(Spain) Granada CF	Loan
3 August 2011	(Bosnia and Herzegovina) Eldin Hadžic	(Spain) Hércules CF	(Spain) Valencia CF Mestalla	Loan
3 August 2011	(Spain) José María de Soto	Free agent	(Spain) FC Cartagena	Free
4 August 2011	(Spain) Javier Arizmendi	(Spain) Getafe CF	(Switzerland) Neuchâtel Xamax	Loan
4 August 2011	(Spain) Mikel Balenziaga	(Spain) Athletic Bilbao	(Spain) Real Valladolid	Free
4 August 2011	(Spain) Oinatz Bilbao	(Spain) CD Guadalajara	(Spain) SD Lemona	Free
4 August 2011	(Spain) David García	(Spain) RCD Espanyol	(Spain) Girona FC	Free
4 August 2011	(Spain) Rafael Clavero	(Spain) FC Cartagena	(Spain) SD Huesca	Free
4 August 2011	(Spain) Dani Gómez	(Spain) FC Cartagena	(Spain) Orihuela CF	Free
4 August 2011	(Argentina) Gabriel Milito	(Spain) FC Barcelona	(Argentina) CA Independiente	Free
5 August 2011	(Spain) Armiche Ortega	(Spain) UD Las Palmas	(Spain) Valencia CF Mestalla	Free
5 August 2011	(Spain) Fran Rico	(Spain) Real Madrid Castilla	(Spain) Granada CF	€1m
5 August 2011	(Denmark) Patrick Mtiliga	(Spain) Málaga CF	(Denmark) FC Nordsjælland	Free
5 August 2011	(Denmark) Nicki Bille	(Spain) Villarreal CF B	(Spain) Elche CF	Loan
6 August 2011	(Spain) Agustín García	(Spain) Córdoba CF	(Spain) AD Alcorcón	Free
9 August 2011	(Italy) Matteo Contini	(Spain) Real Zaragoza	(Italy) A.C. Siena	Loan
9 August 2011	(Spain) Jagoba Beobide	(Spain) Córdoba CF	(Spain) Real Unión	Free
9 August 2011	(Spain) David Sánchez	(Spain) Elche CF	(Spain) CD Atlético Baleares	Free
9 August 2011	(Spain) Raúl Goni	(Spain) Real Zaragoza	(Spain) FC Cartagena	Loan
10 August 2011	(Spain) Miquel Robusté	(Spain) Levante UD	(Spain) Xerez CD	Free
10 August 2011	(Spain) Mikel Dañobeitia	(Spain) Córdoba CF	(Spain) UD Logroñés	Free
10 August 2011	(Cameroon) Achille Emana	(Spain) Real Betis	(Saudi Arabia) Al-Hilal FC	€4.5m
10 August 2011	(Spain) Ximo Navarro	(Spain) RCD Mallorca B	(Spain) Recreativo de Huelva	Loan
11 August 2011	(Spain) Julio Álvarez	(Spain) CD Tenerife	(Spain) CD Numancia	Free
11 August 2011	(Spain) David López	(Spain) RCD Espanyol	(Spain) CD Leganés	Loan
11 August 2011	(France) Marc Fachan	(Spain) Gimnàstic de Tarragona	(Spain) Deportivo Alavés	Free
11 August 2011	(Argentina) Gustavo Cabral	(Mexico) Estudiantes Tecos	(Spain) Levante UD	Loan
11 August 2011	(Spain) Javi Jiménez	(Spain) Real Valladolid	(Spain) Real Murcia	Free
11 August 2011	(Honduras) Anthony Lozano	(Honduras) C.D. Olimpia	(Spain) Valencia CF	Free
11 August 2011	(Honduras) Anthony Lozano	(Spain) Valencia CF	(Spain) CD Alcoyano	Loan
11 August 2011	(Spain) Miguel María Aragón	(Spain) RSD Alcalá	(Spain) AD Alcorcón	Free
12 August 2011	(Turkey) Arda Turan	(Turkey) Galatasaray	(Spain) Atlético Madrid	€12m
12 August 2011	(Spain) Jorge Galán	(Spain) CA Osasuna	(Scotland) Kilmarnock F.C.	Loan
12 August 2011	(Argentina) Franco Zuculini	(Germany) TSG 1899 Hoffenheim	(Spain) Real Zaragoza	Loan
13 August 2011	(Spain) Juan Valera	(Spain) Atlético Madrid	(Spain) Getafe CF	Free
13 August 2011	(Spain) Roberto Trashorras	(Spain) Celta de Vigo	(Spain) Rayo Vallecano	Free
13 August 2011	(Uruguay) Cristian Stuani	(Italy) Reggina Calcio	(Spain) Racing de Santander	Loan
13 August 2011	(Spain) David de Coz	(Spain) Córdoba CF	(Spain) Granada CF	Free
13 August 2011	(Spain) David de Coz	(Spain) Granada CF	(Spain) Cádiz CF	Free
13 August 2011	(France) Jérémy Lempereur	(Spain) AD Alcorcón	(Spain) UD Salamanca	Free
13 August 2011	(Portugal) Carlos Martins	(Portugal) S.L. Benfica	(Spain) Granada CF	Loan
13 August 2011	(Spain) Francis Durán	(England) Liverpool	(Spain) Elche CF	Free
13 August 2011	(Spain) Francis Durán	(Spain) Elche CF	(Spain) Orihuela CF	Loan
13 August 2011	(Spain) Ramón Arcas	(Spain) Racing de Santander	(Spain) Recreativo de Huelva	Free
13 August 2011	(Spain) Adrián Sardinero	(Spain) Getafe CF	(Spain) Hércules CF	Loan
14 August 2011	(Paraguay) Nelson Valdez	(Spain) Hércules CF	(Russia) FC Rubin Kazan	€4m
14 August 2011	(Spain) Iñigo Díaz de Cerio	(Spain) Athletic Bilbao	(Spain) CD Numancia	Loan
14 August 2011	(Spain) Cesc Fàbregas	(England) Arsenal	(Spain) FC Barcelona	€40m
15 August 2011	(Nigeria) Samson Kayode	(Vietnam) Đồng Tháp F.C.	(Spain) Atlético Madrid	Free
15 August 2011	(Nigeria) Samson Kayode	(Spain) Atlético Madrid	(Portugal) S.C. Braga	Loan
15 August 2011	(Spain) Omar Monterde	(Spain) Levante UD B	(Spain) CD Alcoyano	Free
15 August 2011	(Spain) Rodri	(Spain) Sevilla FC	(Spain) FC Barcelona B	€1.5m
15 August 2011	(Portugal) Fernando Meira	(Russia) FC Zenit Saint Petersburg	(Spain) Real Zaragoza	Free
16 August 2011	(Portugal) Jorge Ribeiro	(Portugal) S.L. Benfica	(Spain) Granada CF	Free
16 August 2011	(Spain) Mikel Labaka	(Spain) Real Sociedad	(Spain) Rayo Vallecano	Free
16 August 2011	(Mexico) Carlos Vela	(England) Arsenal	(Spain) Real Sociedad	Loan
16 August 2011	(Spain) Raúl García	(Spain) Atlético Madrid	(Spain) CA Osasuna	Loan
16 August 2011	(Portugal) André Castro	(Portugal) F.C. Porto	(Spain) Sporting de Gijón	Loan
16 August 2011	(Spain) Iñaki Muñoz	(Spain) FC Cartagena	(Spain) UD Salamanca	Free
16 August 2011	(Spain) Antonio Sánchez	(Spain) Real Betis	(Spain) SD Huesca	Free
17 August 2011	(Spain) Goku	(Spain) Granada CF	(Spain) Burgos CF	Loan
17 August 2011	(France) Grégory Béranger	(Spain) CD Tenerife	(Spain) Elche CF	Free
17 August 2011	(Spain) Diego Antón	(Spain) CD Numancia	(Spain) Arandina CF	Loan
17 August 2011	(Morocco) Nabil Baha	(Greece) AEK Athens	(Spain) CE Sabadell FC	Free
17 August 2011	(Spain) Jorge Gotor	(Spain) Real Murcia	(Spain) Getafe CF B	Free
17 August 2011	(Scotland) Ikechi Anya	(Spain) Granada CF	(Spain) Cádiz CF	Loan
17 August 2011	(Brazil) Júlio César	(Portugal) S.L. Benfica	(Spain) Granada CF	Loan
17 August 2011	(South Africa) Tsepo Masilela	(Israel) Maccabi Haifa	(Spain) Getafe CF	Loan
17 August 2011	(Spain) Carlos Bellvís	(Spain) CD Tenerife	(Spain) Celta de Vigo	Free
17 August 2011	(Spain) Carles Marc	(Spain) Real Murcia	(Spain) CD San Roque de Lepe	Free
17 August 2011	(Uruguay) Adrián Luna	(Spain) RCD Espanyol	(Spain) Gimnàstic de Tarragona	Loan
17 August 2011	(Kenya) McDonald Mariga	(Italy) F.C. Internazionale	(Spain) Real Sociedad	Loan
18 August 2011	(France) Mickaël Gaffoor	(Spain) Celta de Vigo B	(Spain) CD Guadalajara	Loan
18 August 2011	(Spain) Granada	(Spain) Granada CF	(Spain) UD Melilla	Free
18 August 2011	(Spain) Jokin Esparza	(Spain) CA Osasuna	(Spain) SD Huesca	Loan
18 August 2011	(Spain) Ustaritz Aldekoaotalora	(Spain) Athletic Bilbao	(Spain) Real Betis	Loan
18 August 2011	(Venezuela) Dani Hernández	(Spain) Real Murcia	(Spain) Real Valladolid	Free
18 August 2011	(Spain) Asier Arranz	(Spain) CD Numancia	(Spain) Sestao River Club	Free
18 August 2011	(Morocco) Nabil El Zhar	(England) Liverpool	(Spain) Levante UD	Free
18 August 2011	(Spain) Enrique Corrales	(Spain) Granada CF	(Spain) UD Las Palmas	Free
18 August 2011	(Colombia) Jeison Murillo	(Spain) Granada CF	(Spain) Cádiz CF	Loan
19 August 2011	(Spain) Gálder Cerrajería	(Spain) Athletic Bilbao	(Spain) Real Murcia	Loan
19 August 2011	(Portugal) Rúben Micael	(Portugal) F.C. Porto	(Spain) Atlético Madrid	€5m
19 August 2011	(Portugal) Rúben Micael	(Spain) Atlético Madrid	(Spain) Real Zaragoza	Loan
19 August 2011	(Colombia) Radamel Falcao	(Portugal) F.C. Porto	(Spain) Atlético Madrid	€40m
19 August 2011	(Spain) Carlos Calvo	(Italy) Udinese Calcio	(Spain) Hércules CF	Free
19 August 2011	(Spain) Rafael Martínez	(Spain) Granada CF	(Spain) Montañeros CF	Loan
19 August 2011	(Ghana) Aziz Tetteh	(Spain) Granada CF	(Spain) Montañeros CF	Loan
20 August 2011	(Chile) Manuel Iturra	Universidad de Chile	(Spain) Real Murcia	Free
20 August 2011	(Spain) Sergio Boris	(Spain) CD Numancia	(Spain) Real Avilés	Free
20 August 2011	(Spain) Daniel Güiza	(Turkey) Fenerbahçe	(Spain) Getafe CF	Free
21 August 2011	(Algeria) Hassan Yebda	(Portugal) S.L. Benfica	(Spain) Granada CF	Free
21 August 2011	(Spain) Juan Mata	(Spain) Valencia CF	(England) Chelsea	€28m
22 August 2011	(Ghana) Ismail Abdul Razak	(Faroe Islands) NSÍ Runavík	(Spain) Real Valladolid	Free
22 August 2011	(Spain) Juanjo García	(Spain) Real Murcia	(Spain) Lorca Atlético CF	Free
22 August 2011	(Spain) Borja Fernández	(Spain) Getafe CF	(Spain) Deportivo de La Coruña	Loan
22 August 2011	(Spain) Rubén Pérez	(Spain) Deportivo de La Coruña	(Spain) Atlético Madrid	Loan return
22 August 2011	(Spain) Rubén Pérez	(Spain) Atlético Madrid	(Spain) Getafe CF	Loan
22 August 2011	(Spain) Juan Quero	(Spain) Rayo Vallecano	(Spain) Córdoba CF	Loan
22 August 2011	(Serbia) Marko Lukić	(Spain) SD Huesca	(Serbia) FK Jagodina	Loan
22 August 2011	(Spain) Dani	(Spain) Recreativo de Huelva	(Spain) CD Atlético Baleares	Free
23 August 2011	(Spain) Anaitz Arbilla	(Spain) UD Salamanca	(Spain) Hércules CF	Free
23 August 2011	(Spain) Juli	(Spain) Rayo Vallecano	(Greece) Asteras Tripolis	Loan
24 August 2011	(Spain) Jorge Molino	(Spain) Real Murcia	(Spain) CF Palencia	Free
24 August 2011	(Spain) Liru	(Spain) Xerez CD	(Spain) CD Lugo	Loan
24 August 2011	(Spain) Aritz López Garai	(Spain) Celta de Vigo	(Spain) Córdoba CF	Free
24 August 2011	(Belgium) Roland Lamah	(France) Le Mans FC	(Spain) CA Osasuna	€1m
24 August 2011	(Spain) Daniel Pacheco	(England) Liverpool	(Spain) Atlético Madrid	Loan
24 August 2011	(Spain) Daniel Pacheco	(Spain) Atlético Madrid	(Spain) Rayo Vallecano	Loan
24 August 2011	(Brazil) Keirrison	(Spain) FC Barcelona	(Brazil) Cruzeiro	Loan
24 August 2011	(Uruguay) Danilo Peinado	(Uruguay) Montevideo Wanderers	(Spain) Recreativo de Huelva	Free
24 August 2011	(Spain) Iván Gómez	Free agent	(Spain) CE Sabadell FC	Free
25 August 2011	(Portugal) Pizzi	(Portugal) S.C. Braga	(Spain) Atlético Madrid	Loan
25 August 2011	(Uruguay) Diego Forlán	(Spain) Atlético Madrid	(Italy) F.C. Internazionale	€5m
25 August 2011	(Italy) Pablo Osvaldo	(Spain) RCD Espanyol	(Italy) A.S. Roma	€15m
25 August 2011	(Mexico) Pablo Barrera	(England) West Ham United	(Spain) Real Zaragoza	Loan
25 August 2011	(Ivory Coast) Arouna Koné	(Spain) Sevilla FC	(Spain) Levante UD	Loan
25 August 2011	(Spain) Raúl Tamudo	(Spain) Real Sociedad	(Spain) Rayo Vallecano	Free
26 August 2011	(Spain) Chechu Flores	(Spain) Girona FC	(Spain) CD Tenerife	Free
26 August 2011	(Spain) Adrián Pollo	(Spain) UD Las Palmas	(Spain) UD Vecindario	Free
26 August 2011	(Spain) Albert Crusat	(Spain) UD Almería	(England) Wigan Athletic	€2m
26 August 2011	(Senegal) Pape Diakhaté	(Ukraine) FC Dynamo Kyiv	(Spain) Granada CF	€4.5m
26 August 2011	(Spain) Borja Viguera	(Spain) Real Sociedad	(Spain) Gimnàstic de Tarragona	Loan
27 August 2011	(Mexico) Taufic Guarch	(Mexico) Estudiantes Tecos	(Spain) RCD Espanyol	Loan
28 August 2011	(Spain) Fran Mérida	(Spain) Atlético Madrid	(Portugal) S.C. Braga	Loan
29 August 2011	(Slovakia) Vladimír Weiss	(England) Manchester City	(Spain) RCD Espanyol	Loan
29 August 2011	(Spain) Urko Vera	(Spain) Athletic Bilbao	(Spain) Hércules CF	Free
29 August 2011	(Spain) Ton Vela	(Spain) Villarreal CF	(Spain) CE L'Hospitalet	Loan
29 August 2011	(Bolivia) Carlos Arias	(Israel) Maccabi Netanya	(Spain) Córdoba CF	Free
29 August 2011	(Spain) Jorge García	(Spain) Sporting de Gijón	(Spain) Real Murcia	Free
29 August 2011	(Spain) Pablo Gómez	(Spain) Real Valladolid	(Spain) UD Salamanca	Free
29 August 2011	(Paraguay) Roque Santa Cruz	(England) Manchester City	(Spain) Real Betis	Loan
30 August 2011	(Spain) Alejandro Campano	(Romania) FC Vaslui	(Spain) Xerez CD	Free
30 August 2011	(Serbia) Duško Tošić	(Serbia) Red Star Belgrade	(Spain) Real Betis	€1m
30 August 2011	(Chile) Fabián Orellana	(Italy) Udinese Calcio	(Spain) Granada CF	Free
30 August 2011	(Spain) Rodri	(Spain) Real Betis	(Spain) CD Guadalajara	Free
30 August 2011	(Chile) Fabián Orellana	(Spain) Granada CF	(Spain) Celta de Vigo	Loan
30 August 2011	(Argentina) Franco Jara	(Portugal) S.L. Benfica	(Spain) Granada CF	Loan
30 August 2011	(Spain) Víctor Ruiz	(Italy) S.S.C. Napoli	(Spain) Valencia CF	€8m
30 August 2011	(Spain) Pablo Orbaiz	(Spain) Athletic Bilbao	(Greece) Olympiacos F.C.	Loan
30 August 2011	(Spain) Saúl Berjón	(Spain) FC Barcelona B	(Spain) AD Alcorcón	Loan
30 August 2011	(Spain) Raúl Navas	(Spain) Real Valladolid	(Spain) Celta de Vigo B	Free
30 August 2011	(Spain) Antonio Barragán	(Spain) Real Valladolid	(Spain) Valencia CF	€1.8m
30 August 2011	(Spain) Arzu	(Spain) Real Betis	(Spain) Gimnàstic de Tarragona	Free
30 August 2011	(Brazil) Elias Mendes	(Spain) Atlético Madrid	(Portugal) Sporting CP	€8.8m
30 August 2011	(Spain) Pedro León	(Spain) Real Madrid	(Spain) Getafe CF	Loan
30 August 2011	(Colombia) Fabián Vargas	(Spain) UD Almería	(Greece) AEK Athens	Free
30 August 2011	(Spain) Fernando Varela	(Turkey) Kasımpaşa S.K.	(Spain) Real Valladolid	Free
30 August 2011	(France) Mouhamadou Dabo	(Spain) Sevilla FC	(France) Olympique Lyonnais	€1m
30 August 2011	(Greece) Alexandros Tziolis	(Italy) A.C. Siena	(Spain) Racing de Santander	Free
30 August 2011	(France) David Trezeguet	(Spain) Hércules CF	(United Arab Emirates) Baniyas SC	Free
31 August 2011	(Spain) Raúl Bravo	(Greece) Olympiacos F.C.	(Spain) Rayo Vallecano	Free
31 August 2011	(Scotland) Ryan Harper	(Spain) Real Betis	(Spain) CD Guadalajara	Free
31 August 2011	(Spain) Roberto Batres	(Spain) Atlético Madrid B	(Spain) CD Alcoyano	Free
31 August 2011	(Nigeria) Ikechukwu Uche	(Spain) Real Zaragoza	(Spain) Villarreal CF	€4m
31 August 2011	(Nigeria) Ikechukwu Uche	(Spain) Villarreal CF	(Spain) Granada CF	Loan
31 August 2011	(Spain) José Manuel Rueda	(Cyprus) AC Omonia	(Spain) Xerez CD	Free
31 August 2011	(Belarus) Alexander Hleb	(Spain) FC Barcelona	(Germany) VfL Wolfsburg	Loan
31 August 2011	(France) Julien Fernandes	Free agent	(Spain) FC Cartagena	Free
31 August 2011	(Argentina) Fernando Gago	(Spain) Real Madrid	(Italy) A.S. Roma	Loan
31 August 2011	(Spain) Rúper	(Spain) CA Osasuna	(Spain) Elche CF	Loan
31 August 2011	(Netherlands) Royston Drenthe	(Spain) Real Madrid	(England) Everton	Free
31 August 2011	(Brazil) Diego Ribas	(Germany) VfL Wolfsburg	(Spain) Atlético Madrid	Loan
31 August 2011	(Spain) Paco Borrego	(Spain) Elche CF	(Spain) UD Salamanca	Free
31 August 2011	(Spain) Adrián Cuevas	(Spain) Xerez CD	(Spain) Valencia CF Mestalla	Free
31 August 2011	(Spain) Quique González	(Spain) Real Valladolid	(Spain) UD Logroñés	Loan
31 August 2011	(Spain) Moisés Hurtado	(Greece) Olympiacos F.C.	(Spain) Granada CF	Free
31 August 2011	(Spain) Rubén Navarro	(Spain) Gimnàstic de Tarragona	(Spain) CD Leganés	Free
31 August 2011	(Spain) Adrien Goñi	(Spain) Girona FC	(Spain) CF Sporting Mahonés	Free
31 August 2011	(Spain) Borja Perea	(Spain) Xerez CD	(Spain) CD San Roque	Loan
31 August 2011	(Spain) Albert Dalmau	(Spain) FC Barcelona B	(Spain) Valencia CF	Free
31 August 2011	(Uruguay) Leandro Cabrera	(Spain) Atlético Madrid	(Spain) CD Numancia	Loan
31 August 2011	(Colombia) Bernardo Espinosa	(Spain) Sevilla FC	(Spain) Racing de Santander	Loan
31 August 2011	(Spain) Toni Doblas	(Spain) Real Zaragoza	(Spain) Xerez CD	Loan
31 August 2011	(Spain) Alberto Escasi	(Spain) Getafe CF	(Spain) Hércules CF	Loan
31 August 2011	(Spain) Víctor Laguardia	(Spain) Real Zaragoza	(Spain) UD Las Palmas	Loan
31 August 2011	(Ivory Coast) Romaric	(Spain) Sevilla FC	(Spain) RCD Espanyol	Loan
31 August 2011	(Portugal) Júlio Alves	(Spain) Atlético Madrid	(Turkey) Beşiktaş J.K.	Free
31 August 2011	(Spain) Luis García	(Spain) RCD Espanyol	(Spain) Real Zaragoza	€1m
31 August 2011	(Spain) Ferran Corominas	(Spain) RCD Espanyol	(Spain) Girona FC	Free
31 August 2011	(Netherlands) Jonathan de Guzmán	(Spain) RCD Mallorca	(Spain) Villarreal CF	€8m
31 August 2011	(Spain) Borja González	(Spain) Atlético Madrid	(Spain) Real Murcia	Loan
31 August 2011	(Uruguay) Walter Pandiani	(Spain) CA Osasuna	(Spain) RCD Espanyol	Free
31 August 2011	(Portugal) Hélder Postiga	(Portugal) Sporting CP	(Spain) Real Zaragoza	€1m
31 August 2011	(Argentina) Fernando Tissone	(Italy) U.C. Sampdoria	(Spain) RCD Mallorca	€4m
31 August 2011	(Spain) Omar Ramos	(Spain) CD Tenerife	(Spain) UD Almería	Loan
31 August 2011	(Spain) Mario Martínez	(Spain) CD Numancia	(Spain) Real Unión	Free
31 August 2011	(Spain) Pablo Ruiz	(Spain) FC Cartagena	(Spain) CE Sabadell FC	Free
31 August 2011	(Cameroon) Yann Songo'o	(Spain) Real Zaragoza B	(Spain) CE Sabadell FC	Free
31 August 2011	(Spain) David Aganzo	(Spain) Rayo Vallecano	(Spain) Hércules CF	Free
31 August 2011	(Uruguay) Matías Alonso	(Spain) Granada CF	(Spain) Zamora CF	Free
31 August 2011	(Spain) Isaías Sánchez	(Spain) RCD Espanyol	(Spain) SD Ponferradina	Free
31 August 2011	(Argentina) Cristian García	(Argentina) CA Banfield	(Spain) Real Murcia	Free
31 August 2011	(Spain) Marco Navas	(Spain) SD Huesca	(Spain) Elche CF	Free
31 August 2011	(Spain) Marco Navas	(Spain) Elche CF	(Spain) CD Leganés	Loan
31 August 2011	(Spain) José Ángel Jurado	(Spain) Real Betis B	(Spain) Villarreal CF	Free
31 August 2011	(Spain) José Ángel Jurado	(Spain) Villarreal CF	(Spain) CD Mirandés	Loan
31 August 2011	(Hungary) Krisztián Vadócz	(Spain) CA Osasuna	(Netherlands) NEC Nijmegen	Free
31 August 2011	(Spain) Koke	(United States) Houston Dynamo	(Spain) Rayo Vallecano	Free
31 August 2011	(Spain) Xisco Nadal	(Spain) Levante UD	(Spain) Alqueries CF	Free
