= Jordi Martín =

Jordi Martín may refer to:

- Jordi Martín (footballer, born 1991), Spanish football midfielder
- Jordi Martín (footballer, born 2001), Spanish football winger

== See also ==
- Jorge Martín (disambiguation)
