= Iván Moreno =

Iván Moreno may refer to:

- Iván Moreno (sprinter) (born 1942), Chilean sprinter
- Iván Moreno (Spanish footballer) (born 1981), Spanish footballer
- Iván Moreno (motorcyclist) (born 1989), Spanish motorcyclist
- Iván Moreno (footballer, born 1998), Mexican footballer
- Estadio Iván Elías Moreno, Chilean multi-purpose stadium
