= Ander Gago =

Spanish footballer

Personal information
- Full name: Ander Gago Álvarez
- Date of birth: 10 September 1984 (age 42)
- Place of birth: Galdakao, Spain
- Height: 1.75 m (5 ft 9 in)
- Position: Right-back

Youth career
- Galdakao
- 1996–1997: Athletic Bilbao
- 2000–2001: Santutxu
- 2001–2003: Athletic Bilbao

Senior career*
Years	Team	Apps	(Gls)
2003–2005	Basconia	46	(2)
2005–2008	Bilbao Athletic	88	(0)
2008	Jaén	0	(0)
2008–2010	Lemona	65	(3)
2010–2011	Murcia	30	(2)
2011–2012	Guadalajara	23	(1)
2013	Atlético Baleares	14	(0)
2013–2014	Guijuelo	21	(2)
2014–2015	Logroñés	26	(0)
2015–2021	Sestao	134	(6)
Total		447	(16)
- * Club domestic league appearances and goals

Ander Gago Álvarez (born 10 September 1984) is a Spanish former professional footballer who played mainly as a right-back.

== Club career ==
Gago was born in Galdakao, Biscay, Basque Country. He all but spent his career in the Segunda División B, after playing youth football at Athletic Bilbao. In that tier, he appeared for that club's reserve team, SD Lemona, Real Murcia CF, CD Atlético Baleares, CD Guijuelo, UD Logroñés and Sestao River Club, which he also represented in the Tercera División before retiring at the age of 36.

The exception to this was in the 2011–12 season, when Gago signed for CD Guadalajara alongside his former Athletic teammate Jonan García. He made his Segunda División debut on 27 August 2011, as a late substitute in a 1–1 home draw against UD Las Palmas, the first of 23 appearances at the professional level in roughly 1,300 minutes of action. His only goal came on 9 October, in injury time of the 1–2 loss to Hércules CF also at the Estadio Pedro Escartín.

On 11 January 2020, Gago and seven other Sestao players who had been brought up at Athletic Bilbao at some point took the field to face them in the second round of the Copa del Rey. The La Liga opposition won 4–0 at the Las Llanas Stadium.
