= Jorge Martín (disambiguation) =

Jorge Martín (born 1998) is a Spanish motorcycle racer.

Jorge Martín may also refer to:

- Jorge Martín (actor) (born 1937), Spanish actor
- Jorge Martín (composer) (born 1959), Cuban-American composer
- Jorge Martín (footballer) (born 1975), Spanish footballer
- Jorge Martín (gymnast) (born 1998), Spanish trampolinist
