= Gerard Badía =

Spanish footballer (born 1989)

Personal information
- Full name: Gerard Badía Cortés
- Date of birth: 18 October 1989 (age 37)
- Place of birth: Horta de Sant Joan, Spain
- Height: 1.76 m (5 ft 9 in)
- Position: Midfielder

Youth career
- Tortosa

Senior career*
Years	Team	Apps	(Gls)
2006–2008	Tortosa	68	(7)
2008–2009	Gavà	25	(3)
2009–2010	Murcia B	12	(0)
2010–2013	Guadalajara	59	(3)
2013–2014	Noja	18	(1)
2014–2021	Piast Gliwice	196	(23)
2021–2022	Ascó	23	(1)
Total		401	(38)
- * Club domestic league appearances and goals

Gerard Badía Cortés (born 18 October 1989) is a Spanish former footballer who played as a midfielder.

He spent his professional career with Guadalajara and Piast Gliwice, winning the Ekstraklasa with the latter club.

== Club career ==
Born in Horta de Sant Joan, Province of Tarragona, Catalonia, Badía all but spent his career in his country in the lower leagues. The exception to this was in the 2011–12 and 2012–13 seasons, when he appeared for CD Guadalajara in the Segunda División.

Badía signed with Polish club Piast Gliwice in February 2014, from SD Noja. He made his Ekstraklasa debut on the 17th, coming on as a late substitute in a 0–1 home loss against Wisła Kraków.

In the 2018–19 campaign, Badía contributed 21 matches and two goals as Piast won the first national championship in their 74-year history. During his spell at the Stadion Miejski, he made 214 competitive appearances.

Badía returned to both Catalonia and amateur football on 14 July 2021, with the 31-year-old joining FC Ascó. After retiring, he took a job at a vulcanization facility.

== Career statistics ==
Appearances and goals by club, season and competition
Club	Season	League			National cup (Note: Includes Copa del Rey, Polish Cup)		Continental		Other		Total	
Club	Season	Division	Apps	Goals	Apps	Goals	Apps	Goals	Apps	Goals	Apps	Goals
Gavà	2008–09	Segunda División B	25	3	2	1	—		—		27	4
Murcia B	2009–10	Segunda División B	12	0	0	0	—		—		12	0
Guadalajara	2010–11	Segunda División B	20	1	0	0	—		6 (Note: Appearances in Segunda División B play-offs)	0	26	1
Guadalajara	2011–12	Segunda División	26	2	0	0	—		—		26	2
Guadalajara	2012–13	Segunda División	13	0	1	0	—		—		14	0
Guadalajara	Total		59	3	1	0	0	0	6	0	66	3
Noja	2013–14	Segunda División B	18	1	0	0	—		—		18	1
Piast Gliwice	2013–14	Ekstraklasa	15	0	0	0	—		—		15	0
Piast Gliwice	2014–15	Ekstraklasa	31	4	2	2	—		—		33	6
Piast Gliwice	2015–16	Ekstraklasa	30	2	1	2	—		—		31	4
Piast Gliwice	2016–17	Ekstraklasa	32	9	1	0	1 (Note: Appearance in UEFA Europa League)	0	—		34	9
Piast Gliwice	2017–18	Ekstraklasa	20	2	0	0	—		—		20	2
Piast Gliwice	2018–19	Ekstraklasa	21	2	2	0	—		—		23	2
Piast Gliwice	2019–20	Ekstraklasa	25	4	2	4	4 (Note: Two appearances in UEFA Champions League, two appearances in UEFA Europa League)	0	1 (Note: Appearance in Polish Super Cup)	0	32	8
Piast Gliwice	2020–21	Ekstraklasa	22	0	3	0	1	0	—		26	0
Piast Gliwice	Total		196	23	11	8	6	0	1	0	214	31
Ascó	2021–22	Tercera Federación	23	1	0	0	—		—		23	1
Career totals			333	31	14	9	6	0	7	0	360	40

== Honours ==
Piast Gliwice

- Ekstraklasa: 2018–19

Individual

- Ekstraklasa Player of the Month: March 2017
- Ekstraklasa Hall of Fame: 2023
