= Boria (footballer) =

Spanish footballer

Personal information
- Full name: José Antonio Ñíguez Vicente
- Date of birth: 30 September 1962 (age 64)
- Place of birth: Elche, Spain
- Height: 1.78 m (5 ft 10 in)
- Position: Striker

Youth career
- Elche

Senior career*
Years	Team	Apps	(Gls)
1981–1988	Elche	167	(39)
1988–1989	Sabadell	20	(4)
1989–1990	Figueres	19	(2)
1990–1991	Cartagena	25	(10)
1991–1993	Elche	64	(13)
1993–1994	Mensajero	6	(1)
Total		301	(69)
- * Club domestic league appearances and goals

José Antonio Ñíguez Vicente (born 30 September 1962), known as Boria, is a Spanish former professional footballer who played as a striker.

He spent most of his senior career with Elche, with which he appeared in all three major levels of Spanish football for a total of ten seasons.

== Career ==
Born in Elche, Valencian Community, Boria played mainly for local Elche CF. He made his senior debut at only 18 and competed almost exclusively in the Segunda División, scoring a career-best 13 goals in 33 games in the 1983–84 season to help the club to return to La Liga after a six-year absence.

Boria featured much less the following campaign, which ended in immediate relegation. His first match in the top flight was on 1 September 1984 in a 1–0 local derby home loss against Valencia CF, and netted his only goal in the competition on 7 October that year, contributing decisively to a 2–1 away win over Real Valladolid.

Boria achieved another promotion to the top tier with the Franjiverdes in 1988, but never played in that tier again, seeing out his professional career in 1990 after spells with CE Sabadell FC and UE Figueres. The following year he re-joined Elche, now in the Segunda División B.

== Personal life ==
Boria's three sons, Aarón, Jonathan and Saúl, are also footballers.
