= José Oya =

Spanish footballer

Personal information
- Full name: José Martínez Oya
- Date of birth: 14 January 1983 (age 43)
- Place of birth: Pamplona, Spain
- Height: 1.83 m (6 ft 0 in)
- Position: Midfielder

Youth career
- Jaén

Senior career*
Years	Team	Apps	(Gls)
2002–2003	Jaén B		
2003–2005	Jaén	27	(1)
2003–2004	→ Carolinense (loan)		
2005–2006	Atlético Madrid B	0	(0)
2005–2006	→ Alcalá (loan)	33	(1)
2006–2007	Marbella	26	(1)
2007–2008	Burgos	29	(3)
2008–2009	Conquense	31	(2)
2009–2010	Barakaldo	30	(3)
2010–2012	Guadalajara	37	(2)
2012–2013	UCAM Murcia	19	(2)
2013–2015	Atlético Mancha Real	49	(3)
2015–2016	Arenas Getxo	19	(1)
Total		300	(19)
- * Club domestic league appearances and goals

José Martínez Oya (born 14 January 1983 in Pamplona, Navarre) is a Spanish former footballer who played as a midfielder.
