= José Collado =

Spanish footballer

Personal information
- Full name: José Antonio Collado Herrera
- Date of birth: 24 March 1990 (age 36)
- Place of birth: Las Palmas, Spain
- Height: 1.90 m (6 ft 3 in)
- Position: Striker

Youth career
- Vecindario
- 2006–2008: Las Palmas
- 2008–2009: Villarreal

Senior career*
Years	Team	Apps	(Gls)
2009–2010	Villarreal	0	(0)
2009–2010	→ Gimnástica (loan)	32	(14)
2010–2012	Braga	0	(0)
2010–2012	→ Atlético Madrid B (loan)	26	(9)
2012	→ Guadalajara (loan)	11	(1)
2012	Braga B	0	(0)
2012–2013	Rayo Vallecano B	8	(0)
2013–2014	Noja	4	(1)
2014	Villarreal C	13	(5)
2014–2015	Las Palmas B	0	(0)
2015–2016	Hospitalet	7	(1)
2016	Cacereño	7	(0)
2016–2017	San Fernando		
2020	Cartes	1	(0)
- * Club domestic league appearances and goals as of 15:38, 11 August 2022 (UTC)

José Antonio Collado Herrera (Spanish pronunciation: [xoˈse koˈʎaðo]; born 24 March 1990) is a Spanish professional footballer who plays as a striker.

== Club career ==
Born in Las Palmas, Canary Islands, Collado played for three clubs as a youth, including Villarreal CF. His first season as a senior was 2009–10, when he was loaned by the Valencians to Gimnástica de Torrelavega in the Segunda División B, eventually finishing as joint-eighth top scorer in group II with 14 goals.

On 18 June 2010, Collado signed a four-year contract for S.C. Braga in Portugal as a free agent. He returned to his country shortly after, however, spending the vast majority of the following two seasons on loan to Atlético Madrid B also in the third tier.

Collado was loaned to CD Guadalajara of the Segunda División in the 2012 January transfer window. He made his professional debut on the 28th, coming on as a second-half substitute in the home fixture against CD Numancia and scoring the game's only goal.

Released in June 2013, Collado went on to spend the rest of his career in the Spanish lower leagues.
