= Javi Soria =

Spanish footballer

Personal information
- Full name: Francisco Javier Sáiz Soria
- Date of birth: 16 May 1984 (age 42)
- Place of birth: Cuenca, Spain
- Height: 1.78 m (5 ft 10 in)
- Positions: Centre-back; defensive midfielder

Youth career
- Real Madrid

Senior career*
Years	Team	Apps	(Gls)
2003–2006	Real Madrid C		
2006–2009	Conquense	103	(11)
2009–2012	Guadalajara	116	(18)
2012–2013	Mirandés	31	(1)
2013–2015	Racing Santander	65	(11)
2015	Huracán	16	(1)
2016	Guadalajara	16	(2)
2016–2019	Conquense	59	(5)
Total		406+	(49+)
- * Club domestic league appearances and goals

Francisco Javier 'Javi' Sáiz Soria (born 16 May 1984 in Cuenca, Castilla–La Mancha) is a Spanish former professional footballer who played as either a central defender or a defensive midfielder.
