= Javi Barral =

Spanish footballer

Personal information
- Full name: Javier Barral García
- Date of birth: 30 September 1981 (age 45)
- Place of birth: Madrid, Spain
- Height: 1.83 m (6 ft 0 in)
- Position: Left-back

Youth career
- Real Madrid

Senior career*
Years	Team	Apps	(Gls)
2002–2003	Real Madrid C		
2003–2004	Alcorcón	35	(1)
2004–2005	S.S. Reyes	12	(0)
2005	Levante B	1	(0)
2005–2009	Alcorcón	132	(4)
2009–2010	Oviedo	30	(0)
2010–2013	Guadalajara	114	(3)
2013–2014	Sabadell	9	(0)
2014–2015	Fuenlabrada	36	(1)
2015–2016	Santa Ana	17	(2)
Total		386	(11)
- * Club domestic league appearances and goals

Javier 'Javi' Barral García (born 30 September 1981 in Madrid) is a Spanish former professional footballer who played as a left-back.
