= Ernesto Gómez (footballer, born 1985) =

Spanish footballer

Ernesto
Personal information
- Full name: Ernesto Gómez Gómez
- Date of birth: 26 April 1985 (age 41)
- Place of birth: Madrid, Spain
- Height: 1.78 m (5 ft 10 in)
- Position: Midfielder

Youth career
- 1997–2004: Real Madrid

Senior career*
Years	Team	Apps	(Gls)
2002–2006	Real Madrid B	22	(0)
2006–2007	Málaga	12	(0)
2007–2009	Ponferradina	73	(5)
2009–2010	Alcorcón	40	(1)
2010–2012	Guadalajara	71	(16)
2012–2013	Recreativo	8	(0)
2013–2015	Lugo	9	(1)
Total		235	(23)

International career
2003	Spain U17	3	(1)
2003	Spain U18	3	(0)
- * Club domestic league appearances and goals

Ernesto Gómez Gómez (born 26 April 1985), known simply as Ernesto, is a Spanish former professional footballer who played as a midfielder.

He appeared in 80 Segunda División matches over five seasons, totalling ten goals for Real Madrid Castilla, Málaga, Guadalajara, Recreativo and Lugo.

== Club career ==
Ernesto was born in Madrid. After unsuccessfully emerging through local Real Madrid's youth ranks (he never made it past the reserves), he went on to represent Málaga CF, SD Ponferradina and AD Alcorcón.

On 27 October 2009, with Alcorcón, Ernesto scored against his first team in the Copa del Rey for a final 4–0 home win (4–1 on aggregate). With that and his following club, CD Guadalajara, he achieved consecutive promotions to the Segunda División, scoring a total of eight goals in the process. His first in that league arrived on 3 September 2011, when he closed the 2–0 away victory over Xerez CD.

Ernesto continued competing in the second tier from the 2012–13 to the 2014–15 seasons, appearing rarely for Recreativo de Huelva and CD Lugo due to injuries and also having a run-in with the latter's coach Quique Setién.
