= Antonio Moreno (defender) =

Spanish footballer

Personal information
- Full name: Antonio Moreno Sánchez
- Date of birth: 13 February 1983 (age 43)
- Place of birth: Puerto Real, Spain
- Height: 1.85 m (6 ft 1 in)
- Position: Right-back

Youth career
- La Salle
- Atlético Madrid

Senior career*
Years	Team	Apps	(Gls)
2002–2004	Atlético Madrid C		
2004–2006	Atlético Madrid B	60	(0)
2006	Atlético Madrid	1	(0)
2006–2007	Mérida	25	(1)
2007–2008	Guadalajara	34	(0)
2008–2009	Cultural Leonesa	33	(0)
2009–2012	Guadalajara	101	(0)
2012–2013	Ceahlăul	16	(0)
2014	Sanluqueño	15	(1)
2014–2016	Guijuelo	33	(1)
2016–2017	Xerez Deportivo	26	(1)
2017–2018	Conil	1	(0)
Total		345	(4)
- * Club domestic league appearances and goals

Antonio Moreno Sánchez (born 13 February 1983 in Puerto Real, Province of Cádiz) is a Spanish former professional footballer who played as a right-back.
