= Francisco Borrego =

Spanish footballer

Paco Borrego
Personal information
- Full name: Francisco José Borrego Campos
- Date of birth: 6 June 1986 (age 40)
- Place of birth: Jaén, Spain
- Height: 1.88 m (6 ft 2 in)
- Position: Centre-back

Youth career
- Jaén
- Barcelona

Senior career*
Years	Team	Apps	(Gls)
2003–2006	Barcelona C	48	(3)
2006–2007	Sevilla B	0	(0)
2007	→ Barbastro (loan)	15	(0)
2007–2010	Huesca	44	(0)
2010–2011	Doxa	20	(0)
2011	Elche	0	(0)
2011–2012	Salamanca	13	(0)
2012–2014	San Fernando	44	(0)
2014–2016	Mérida	43	(2)
2016–2017	Badajoz	22	(0)
2017–2018	Xerez	18	(1)
2018–2020	Los Barrios	51	(1)
2020–2021	Rota	18	(0)

International career
2001–2002	Spain U16	6	(0)
2002–2003	Spain U17	10	(0)
2003	Spain U18	3	(0)
- * Club domestic league appearances and goals

Francisco José 'Paco' Borrego Campos (born 6 June 1986) is a Spanish former footballer who played as a central defender.
