= Jorge Molino =

Spanish footballer

Personal information
- Full name: Jorge Molino Baena
- Date of birth: 4 March 1988 (age 38)
- Place of birth: Madrid, Spain
- Height: 1.82 m (5 ft 11 1/2 in)
- Position: Striker

Youth career
- Sporting Hortaleza
- 2000–2005: Unión Adarve
- 2005–2007: Atlético Madrid

Senior career*
Years	Team	Apps	(Gls)
2007–2008	Atlético Madrid C		
2008–2010	Atlético Madrid B	57	(12)
2010	Atlético Madrid	1	(0)
2010–2011	Murcia	12	(2)
2011–2012	Palencia	29	(5)
2012–2015	Fuenlabrada	87	(18)
Total		186	(37)
- * Club domestic league appearances and goals

Jorge Molino Baena (born 4 March 1988) is a Spanish former professional footballer who played mainly as a second striker.

== Club career ==
Born in Madrid, Molino was a youth graduate at local Atlético Madrid. He played three seasons with the reserve team in the Segunda División B, scoring ten goals in 33 games in 2009–10 for a final seventh place.

Molino made his first-team – and La Liga – debut on 4 April 2010, coming on as a substitute for Simão Sabrosa in the 85th minute of a 3–0 home win against Deportivo de La Coruña. In the ensuing off-season, he signed a two-year contract with Real Murcia in the third division, with the Colchoneros retaining a buying option after the first year.

In late August 2011, having contributed rarely to Murcia's promotion due to injury, Molino stayed in the third tier and signed with CF Palencia.
