= Mickaël Gaffoor =

French footballer (born 1987)

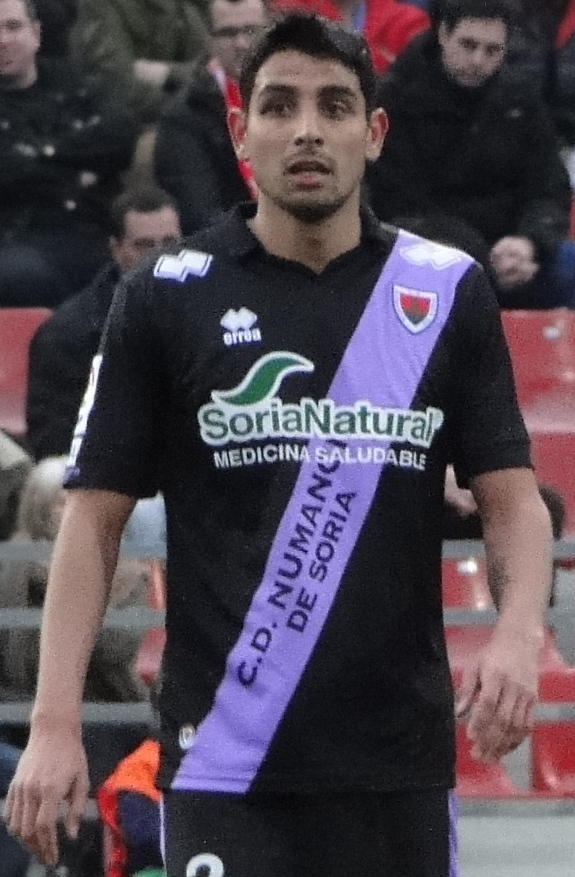
- Gaffoor with Numancia in 2015

Personal information
- Full name: Mickaël Ziard Alain Gaffoor
- Date of birth: 21 January 1987 (age 39)
- Place of birth: Bezons, France
- Height: 1.84 m (6 ft 0 in)
- Position: Centre-back

Youth career
- Saint-Étienne

Senior career*
Years	Team	Apps	(Gls)
2005–2006	Saint-Étienne B		
2006–2007	Rodez	17	(0)
2007–2008	Sangonera	30	(1)
2008–2010	Zaragoza B	47	(3)
2010–2013	Celta B	33	(0)
2011–2013	→ Guadalajara (loan)	46	(5)
2013–2015	Numancia	55	(4)
2015–2016	Mirandés	13	(0)
2016–2018	Albacete	73	(2)
2018–2019	Omonia	10	(0)
2019–2021	Andorra	39	(0)
2021–2022	Águilas	23	(1)
2022–2023	Atlético Pulpileño	27	(3)
2023–2025	Unión Molinense	57	(2)
Total		470	(21)
- * Club domestic league appearances and goals

Mickaël Ziard Alain Gaffoor (born 21 January 1987) is a French former professional footballer who played as a centre-back.

== Club career ==
Born in Bezons, Île-de-France, Gaffoor spent the vast majority of his professional career in Spain, starting out at Sangonera Atlético CF in 2007. In the country's Segunda División, he played a total of 150 matches in representation of CD Guadalajara, CD Numancia, CD Mirandés and Albacete Balompié (ten goals scored).

On 25 June 2018, Cypriot First Division club AC Omonia announced the signing of Gaffoor. The 32-year-old free agent returned to the Spanish Segunda División B one year later, joining FC Andorra in an undisclosed deal.
