= Cristian Fernández (Spanish footballer) =

Spanish footballer (born 1988)

Personal information
- Full name: Cristian Fernández Conchuela
- Date of birth: 22 December 1988 (age 37)
- Place of birth: Guadalajara, Spain
- Height: 1.76 m (5 ft 9 in)
- Position: Winger

Youth career
- Guadalajara
- Rayo Vallecano

Senior career*
Years	Team	Apps	(Gls)
2007–2009	Azuqueca	68	(20)
2009–2011	Albacete B	64	(24)
2011	Albacete	9	(1)
2011–2013	Guadalajara	65	(5)
2013–2015	Ponferradina	31	(1)
2015–2016	Recreativo	25	(0)
2016–2017	Lleida Esportiu	22	(2)
2017–2020	Talavera	95	(11)
2020–2021	Calahorra	17	(0)
2021–2022	Tarazona	26	(0)
2022–2024	Marchamalo	53	(5)
Total		475	(69)
- * Club domestic league appearances and goals

Cristian Fernández Conchuela (born 22 December 1988) is a Spanish former professional footballer who played as a left winger.

== Career ==
Born in Guadalajara, Castilla–La Mancha, Fernández made his senior debuts in amateur football. In 2009, he joined Albacete Balompié, going on to spend nearly two full seasons with the B team in the Tercera División and scoring 17 goals in his second as they finished in second position.

On 2 April 2011, Fernández made his official debut with Albacete's main squad, playing 25 minutes in a Segunda División match against UD Salamanca after coming on as a substitute for David Sousa, in an eventual 1–0 home win. He appeared in a further eight games during the campaign, ended in relegation, scoring in the last fixture to help the hosts defeat SD Huesca 3–1.

Fernández stayed in the second division for 2011–12, signing with CD Guadalajara whom he had already represented as a youth. After another relegation in 2013 he joined SD Ponferradina, newly promoted to the second tier.

From 2015 to 2021, Fernández competed in the Segunda División B with Recreativo de Huelva, Lleida Esportiu, CF Talavera de la Reina and CD Calahorra. On 8 October 2024, he announced his retirement at the age of 35.
