= Rodri (footballer, born 1986) =

Spanish footballer

Personal information
- Full name: Rodrigo Suárez Peña
- Date of birth: 7 March 1986 (age 40)
- Place of birth: Utrera, Spain
- Height: 1.75 m (5 ft 9 in)
- Position: Midfielder

Youth career
- Betis

Senior career*
Years	Team	Apps	(Gls)
2005–2009	Betis B	113	(11)
2007–2011	Betis	25	(1)
2011	→ Cartagena (loan)	7	(0)
2011–2012	Guadalajara	22	(2)
Total		167	(14)
- * Club domestic league appearances and goals

Rodrigo Suárez Peña (born 7 March 1986), commonly known as Rodri, is a Spanish former professional footballer who played as a midfielder.

== Club career ==
Rodrin was born in Utrera, Province of Seville. A product of Real Betis' academy, he made his debut for the first team on 12 December 2007 by featuring the full 90 minutes in a 1–1 draw at Elche CF in the round of 32 of the Copa del Rey (4–1 aggregate win). His maiden Segunda División appearance came two years later against Córdoba CF, and he played 23 matches during the season – only four complete – as the Andalusians finished in fourth position, thus failing to regain their La Liga status.

In the last minutes of the 2011 January transfer window, Rodri was loaned to fellow second-tier club FC Cartagena until June. After spending the following campaign with CD Guadalajara, scoring his second and third goals in division two in wins over Córdoba (3–1 at home) and Elche (3–2 away), he retired at only 26 years of age.
