= Víctor Fernández (footballer, born 1987) =

Spanish footballer

Personal information
- Full name: Víctor Fernández Maza
- Date of birth: 25 August 1987 (age 39)
- Place of birth: Santander, Spain
- Height: 1.75 m (5 ft 9 in)
- Position: Left-back

Youth career
- Perines

Senior career*
Years	Team	Apps	(Gls)
2006–2007	Gimnástica	19	(0)
2007–2009	Zaragoza B	76	(14)
2009–2010	Valencia B	21	(1)
2010–2011	Celta B	21	(1)
2011	Celta	3	(0)
2011–2012	Guadalajara	14	(1)
2012–2013	Logroñés	26	(0)
2013–2017	Cayón	95	(12)
2019–2022	Cayón	70	(4)
Total		345	(33)

International career
2007	Spain U20	1	(0)
- * Club domestic league appearances and goals

Víctor Fernández Maza (born 25 August 1987 in Santander, Cantabria) is a Spanish former professional footballer who played as a left-back.
