= Ryan Harper (footballer) =

Scottish footballer (born 1987)

Personal information
- Date of birth: 16 April 1987 (age 39)
- Place of birth: Barrhead, Scotland
- Position: Striker

Youth career
- Fuengirola

Senior career*
Years	Team	Apps	(Gls)
2006–2007	Fuengirola	16	(4)
2007–2008	Poli Ejido B	39	(11)
2008–2009	Villanueva	9	(2)
2009	Alcobendas Sport	15	(0)
2009–2010	Estepona	36	(12)
2010–2011	Betis B	35	(5)
2011–2012	Guadalajara	9	(1)
2012–2013	Fuenlabrada	24	(3)
2013–2014	Algeciras	22	(4)
Total		205	(42)
- * Club domestic league appearances and goals

Ryan Harper (born 16 April 1987) is a Scottish former professional footballer who played as a striker.

== Career ==
Born in Barrhead, East Renfrewshire, Harper spent his entire senior career in Spain where he arrived at the age of seven, but competed mainly in the lower leagues. He represented UD Fuengirola Los Boliches, Polideportivo Ejido B, CD Villanueva, Fútbol Alcobendas Sport, Unión Estepona CF, Real Betis B (he even signed a professional contract with the club in October 2010, but never appeared officially for the first team), CD Guadalajara, CF Fuenlabrada and Algeciras CF.

Harper only played at the professional level with Guadalajara. On 10 September 2011 he made his Segunda División debut, coming on as a second-half substitute in a 2–1 home win against SD Huesca. He scored in the following round to help to a 3–3 draw at Villarreal CF B, but suffered an anterior cruciate ligament injury to his left knee shortly after, going to miss the vast majority of the season.

Ryan Harper works as co-director in the Spanish subsidiary of Wasserman Media Group and is a registered agent of the Royal Spanish Football Federation (RFEF).

== Personal life ==
Harper's younger brothers, Jack and Mac, were also footballers.
