= Estadio Pedro Escartín =

Multi-use stadium in Guadalajara, Spain

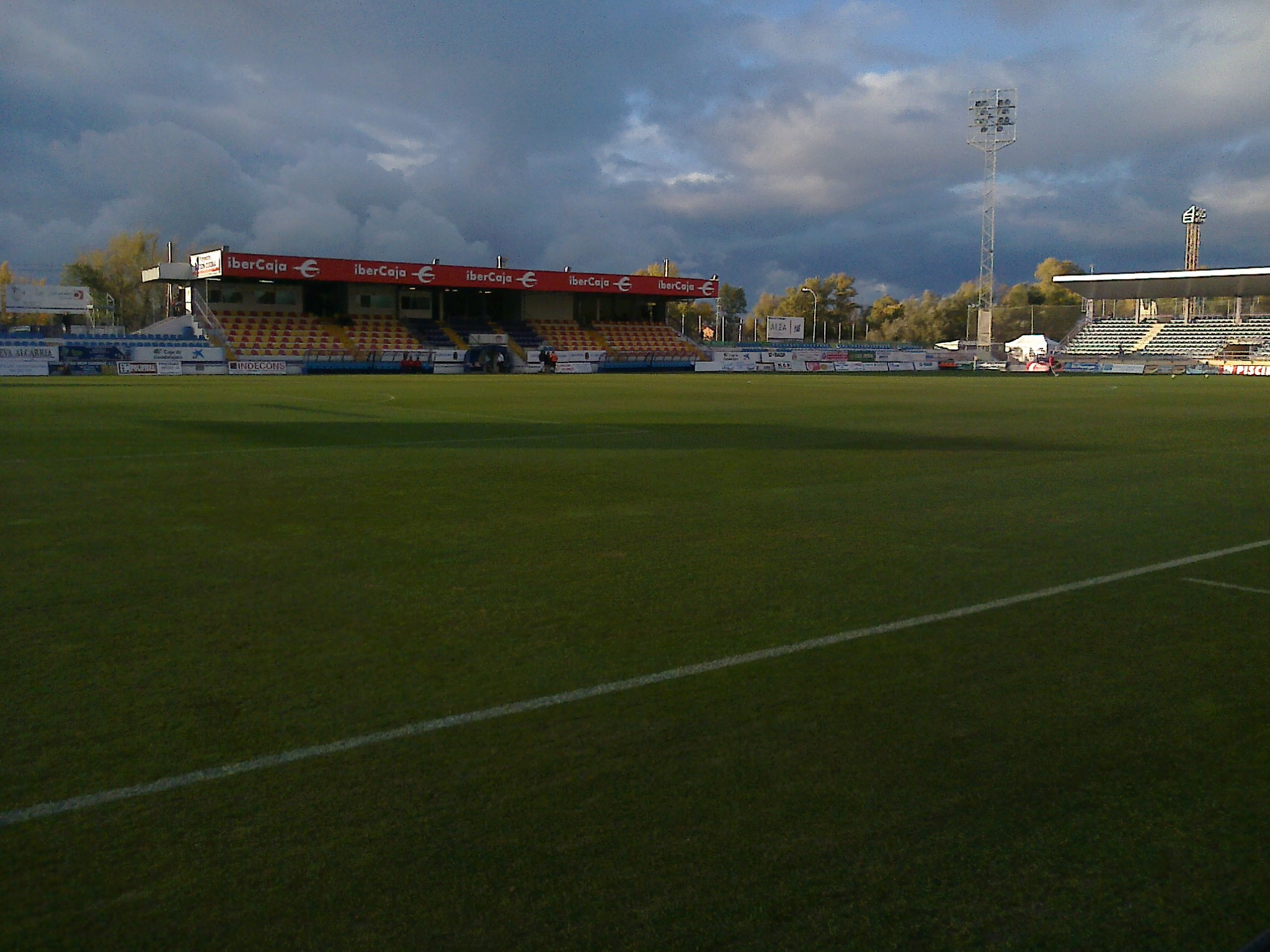
- Interactive map of Estadio Pedro Escartín
- Full name: Estadio Pedro Escartín
- Location: Guadalajara, Spain
- Coordinates: 40.634278°N 3.182657°W
- Capacity: 6,000
- Surface: Grass

Construction
- Opened: September 17, 1967

Tenant
- CD Guadalajara

Estadio Pedro Escartín is a multi-use stadium in Guadalajara, Spain. It is currently used mostly for football matches and serves as the home stadium of CD Guadalajara of the Primera Federación. The stadium holds 6,000 spectators and opened in 1967. The stadium is named after Pedro Escartín. In 2017, the stadium also hosted the rugby union test match between Spain and England Counties XV on 3 June 2017, as well the women's rugby union test between Spain and France on 11 November 2017.
