= Jony (footballer, born 1985) =

Spanish footballer

Personal information
- Full name: Jonathan Ñíguez Esclápez
- Date of birth: 2 April 1985 (age 41)
- Place of birth: Elche, Spain
- Height: 1.74 m (5 ft 9 in)
- Position: Midfielder

Team information
- Current team: Costa City

Youth career
- Valencia

Senior career*
Years	Team	Apps	(Gls)
2003–2004	Valencia C		
2004–2005	Valencia B	27	(2)
2005–2007	Real Madrid C		
2006	Real Madrid B	1	(0)
2007–2008	Villarreal B	25	(2)
2008–2010	Ontinyent	65	(2)
2010–2011	Las Palmas	0	(0)
2010–2011	→ Mirandés (loan)	31	(2)
2011–2013	Guadalajara	72	(2)
2013–2014	Alcorcón	19	(0)
2014–2015	Rio Ave	1	(0)
2015–2016	Feirense	0	(0)
2016	Koper	5	(0)
2016–2017	Alcoyano	35	(11)
2017	Mallorca	0	(0)
2017–2018	UCAM Murcia	15	(3)
2018–2020	Elche	16	(1)
2019–2020	→ Alcoyano (loan)	27	(5)
2020–2021	Alcoyano	22	(1)
2021–2025	Athletic Torrellano	113	(13)
2025–	Costa City	16	(5)
- * Club domestic league appearances and goals as of 13:28, 4 October 2026 (UTC)

Jonathan Ñíguez Esclápez (born 2 April 1985), commonly known as Jony, is a Spanish professional footballer who plays as a midfielder for Segona FFCV club Costa City.

Having begun his career in the reserve teams of Valencia, Real Madrid and Villarreal, he later became a journeyman.

== Career ==
Jony was born in Elche, Valencian Community. With the exception of one Segunda División game with Real Madrid Castilla, he played until the age of 26 in lower league football, representing mainly Real Madrid C and Ontinyent CF.

In the summer of 2011, Jony returned to the second division with CD Guadalajara, playing 33 games (26 starts) as his new team went on to retain their newly acquired league status. He scored his first goal during the following season, but in a 5–1 home loss against Girona FC on 25 August 2012.

On 2 August 2013, following Guadalajara's relegation due to financial irregularities, Jony stayed in division two by signing for two years with AD Alcorcón. He made 25 competitive appearances over the campaign, being sent off in the penultimate fixture on 3 May 2014, a 1–0 win over Sporting de Gijón at the Estadio Santo Domingo.

Jony moved abroad for the first time on 4 July 2014, signing a two-year deal at Portuguese club Rio Ave FC. He was not included in their squad for that year's Supertaça Cândido de Oliveira, nor did he feature at all in the UEFA Europa League, his input eventually consisting of three official matches; his sole Primeira Liga appearance came on 17 May 2015 in the penultimate game of the season, coming on as a substitute for Diego Lopes for the final two minutes of a 4–0 defeat at C.S. Marítimo.

Jony then joined C.D. Feirense, making one Taça da Liga appearance and two unused substitute roles in the Segunda Liga before he and Otávio Guariente had the contracts cancelled. He resumed his career on 10 February 2016 in Slovenia at FC Koper, and turned down an approach by CD Alcoyano in June.

On 8 June 2016, Jony's contract with Koper was mutually terminated. Later that month, he made the move to Alcoyano, and scored a career-best 11 goals over the campaign to reach the playoffs; this included two in a 3–2 home defeat of FC Barcelona B on 11 September.

Jony signed for RCD Mallorca in June 2017. Before playing a game, he rescinded his contract and moved to UCAM Murcia CF in the same league on 31 August. On 26 December, he left the latter side by the same manner, and joined Elche CF from his hometown the next day.

Jony scored his first Elche goal on 6 May 2018 to open a 1–1 draw against provincial rivals Hércules CF in the penultimate round of a season that ended with promotion by the playoffs. After making just one substitute appearance in 2018–19 in the second tier, he was loaned back to Alcoyano in July 2019, this time in the Tercera División; the move was extended for a further year on 8 September 2020.

== Personal life ==
Jony comes from a football family: his father José Antonio played several years with Elche CF – including the 1984–85 season in La Liga – as a striker.

His younger brother, Aarón (another midfielder), was also brought up at Valencia, spending most of his senior career in the second tier. The youngest, Saúl, was developed at Atlético Madrid.
