= Jorge Martín (footballer) =

Spanish footballer and manager

Personal information
- Full name: Jorge Juan Martín de San Pablo Sánchez de Rojas
- Date of birth: 24 November 1975 (age 50)
- Place of birth: Toledo, Spain
- Height: 1.83 m (6 ft 0 in)
- Position: Centre back

Team information
- Current team: Alcalá (coach)

Senior career*
Years	Team	Apps	(Gls)
1996–1997	Torrijos		
1997–2000	CD Manchego	76	(2)
2000–2001	Yeclano		
2001–2002	Mensajero	23	(1)
2002–2003	Toledo	31	(2)
2003–2004	Calasparra		
2004–2005	Manchego CF		
2005–2012	Guadalajara	151	(0)

Managerial career
- 2013–2016: Guadalajara (assistant)
- 2016–2018: Mirandés B
- 2018–: Alcalá
- * Club domestic league appearances and goals

Jorge Juan Martín de San Pablo Sánchez de Rojas (born 24 November, 1975), known simply as Jorge, is a Spanish former footballer who played as a central defender, and the manager of RSD Alcalá.

== Playing career ==
Born in Toledo, Castile-La Mancha, Jorge spent most of his senior career, which spanned 16 seasons, in Segunda División B and Tercera División. In 2005, he signed for CD Guadalajara in the former level, where he remained until his retirement seven years later.

Jorge contributed with 33 games in the 2010–11 campaign – playoffs included – as the side promoted to Segunda División for the first time in their history. On 27 August, 2011, aged nearly 36, he played his first match as a professional, a 1–1 home draw against UD Las Palmas in which he featured the full 90 minutes.

== Coaching career ==
Jorge retired at the end of 2011–12, after totalling 992 minutes of action to help Guadalajara retain their league status. He continued linked to the club in the following years, as an assistant general manager, youth coach and assistant to the first team.
