= Carlos Quesada =

Spanish footballer

Personal information
- Full name: Carlos Manuel Quesada Boj
- Date of birth: 3 May 1985 (age 41)
- Place of birth: Crevillent, Spain
- Height: 1.85 m (6 ft 1 in)
- Position: Centre-back

Senior career*
Years	Team	Apps	(Gls)
2004–2006	Elche B		
2005–2008	Elche	7	(0)
2006–2007	→ Jaén (loan)	12	(0)
2007	→ Orihuela (loan)	4	(0)
2008	→ Guadalajara (loan)	15	(3)
2008–2011	Guadalajara	66	(5)
2011–2012	Atlético Baleares	25	(3)
2012–2013	UCAM Murcia	26	(2)
2013–2014	Reus	27	(2)
2014–2016	Burgos	63	(10)
2016–2017	Mezzolara	31	(3)
2017–2018	Atlético Saguntino	21	(1)
2018–2023	Crevillente	121	(13)
2023–2025	Almoradí	40	(2)
- * Club domestic league appearances and goals as of 2 March 2025

Carlos Manuel Quesada Boj (born 3 May 1985) is a Spanish footballer who plays as a central defender.

== Club career ==
Born in Crevillent, Province of Alicante, Quesada graduated from Elche CF's youth system, making his senior debut with their reserves in the 2004–05 season, in the Tercera División. He played his first game as a professional on 12 February 2006, starting for the first team in a 0–1 Segunda División home loss against Levante UD.

Quesada spent the next ten years in the Segunda División B, representing Real Jaén, Orihuela CF, CD Guadalajara, CD Atlético Baleares, UCAM Murcia CF, CF Reus Deportiu and Burgos CF.

== Personal life ==
Quesada's father, Manuel (born 1959), acted as captain to Elche in the 1980s.

== Career statistics ==
As of 7 May 2016

Club	Season	League			Cup		Continental		Total	
Club	Season	Division	Apps	Goals	Apps	Goals	Apps	Goals	Apps	Goals
Elche	2005–06	Segunda División	7	0	0	0	—		7	0
Jaén (loan)	2006–07	Segunda División B	12	0	0	0	—		12	0
Orihuela (loan)	2007–08	Segunda División B	4	0	0	0	—		4	0
Guadalajara (loan)	2007–08	Segunda División B	15	3	0	0	—		15	3
Guadalajara	2008–09	Segunda División B	19	1	0	0	—		19	1
Guadalajara	2009–10	Segunda División B	29	4	0	0	2 (Note: Appearances in Segunda División B play-offs)	0	31	4
Guadalajara	2010–11	Segunda División B	18	0	0	0	2	0	20	0
Guadalajara	Total		81	8	0	0	4	0	85	8
Atlético Baleares	2011–12	Segunda División B	25	3	0	0	3	0	28	3
UCAM Murcia	2012–13	Segunda División B	26	2	0	0	—		26	2
Reus	2013–14	Segunda División B	27	2	0	0	—		27	2
Burgos	2014–15	Segunda División B	35	5	0	0	—		35	5
Burgos	2015–16	Segunda División B	28	5	0	0	—		28	5
Burgos	Total		63	10	0	0	—		63	10
Career total			245	25	0	0	7	0	252	25
