= Joseba Arriaga =

Spanish footballer (born 1982)

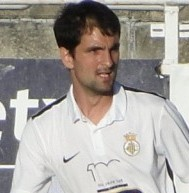
- Arriaga in 2016

Personal information
- Full name: Joseba Arriaga Dosantos
- Date of birth: 28 July 1982 (age 44)
- Place of birth: Ermua, Spain
- Height: 1.71 m (5 ft 7 in)
- Position: Forward

Youth career
- 1996–1997: Ermua
- 1997–2000: Athletic Bilbao

Senior career*
Years	Team	Apps	(Gls)
2000–2001	Basconia	38	(12)
2001–2002	Bilbao Athletic	30	(15)
2002–2006	Athletic Bilbao	56	(3)
2005–2006	→ Eibar (loan)	28	(1)
2006–2007	Las Palmas	32	(1)
2007–2009	Jaén	63	(17)
2009–2010	Cádiz	5	(0)
2010	→ Alavés (loan)	19	(7)
2010–2011	Ceuta	8	(0)
2011–2012	Guadalajara	18	(0)
2012	Gimnàstic	11	(1)
2013–2014	Barakaldo	28	(12)
2014–2016	Amorebieta	50	(5)
2016–2017	Real Unión	25	(2)
2018	Amorebieta	10	(0)
Total		421	(76)

International career
2002–2003	Spain U21	8	(2)
- * Club domestic league appearances and goals

Joseba Arriaga Dosantos (born 28 July 1982) is a Spanish former footballer who played as a forward.

Brought up at Athletic Bilbao, he spent most of his 18-year senior career in the Segunda División B, representing a host of clubs. His professional input consisted of 56 La Liga matches (three goals), and 83 appearances in the Segunda División for four teams.

== Club career ==
Born in Ermua, Biscay, Arriaga emerged through Athletic Bilbao's youth system at Lezama, and was promoted to the first team for the 2002–03 season. He made his debut in a friendly against farm team CD Basconia on 26 July 2002, coming on as a substitute for Julen Guerrero. He first appeared in La Liga one month later, playing the full 90 minutes of the 4–2 away loss against Real Sociedad in a Basque derby.

Arriaga's importance would drastically diminish in the 2003–04 campaign, when he was only third or fourth-choice, and eventually had to resume his career in the Segunda División, with SD Eibar and UD Las Palmas. He then had two steady years at Real Jaén, but in the Segunda División B.

After a good second year where he scored 12 goals, Arriaga stayed in Andalusia but moved to Cádiz CF, recently returned to the second division. He was loaned to Deportivo Alavés one league below in the 2010 winter transfer window, and alternated between the second and third tiers of Spanish football the following seasons, with AD Ceuta, CD Guadalajara and Gimnàstic de Tarragona.

Arriaga was released by Catalonia's Gimnàstic in late December 2012. He returned to his native region in January 2013, signing for lowly Barakaldo CF.

On 22 May 2014, Arriaga moved to neighbouring SD Amorebieta also in the third tier. Four years later, following another spell with that club and also Real Unión, the 36-year-old announced his retirement.
