= Iván Moreno (Spanish footballer) =

Spanish footballer

Personal information
- Full name: José Iván Moreno Dellano
- Date of birth: 26 February 1981 (age 45)
- Place of birth: Plasencia, Spain
- Height: 1.72 m (5 ft 8 in)
- Position: Winger

Youth career
- Plasencia

Senior career*
Years	Team	Apps	(Gls)
2000–2001	Plasencia	25	(39)
2001–2002	Alavés C		
2002–2003	Benidorm	7	(0)
2003–2004	Don Benito	11	(2)
2004	Hellín		
2004–2005	Torredonjimeno		
2005–2006	Díter Zafra	33	(2)
2006–2012	Guadalajara	190	(32)
2012–2013	Ponferradina	32	(5)
2013–2014	Murcia	36	(0)
2014–2015	Racing Santander	22	(0)
2015–2016	La Roda	18	(0)
- * Club domestic league appearances and goals

José Iván Moreno Dellano (born 26 January 1981 in Plasencia, Extremadura) is a Spanish former professional footballer who played as a right winger.

He appeared in 130 Segunda División matches over four seasons, scoring a total of 12 goals for CD Guadalajara, SD Ponferradina, Real Murcia and Racing de Santander.
