= Jonan García =

Spanish footballer (born 1983)

Personal information
- Full name: Jon Andoni García Aranbillet
- Date of birth: 8 January 1983 (age 43)
- Place of birth: Bilbao, Spain
- Height: 1.71 m (5 ft 7 in)
- Position: Midfielder

Youth career
- 1994–1995: Santutxu
- 1995–2000: Athletic Bilbao

Senior career*
Years	Team	Apps	(Gls)
2000–2001	Basconia	19	(8)
2000–2003	Bilbao Athletic	73	(12)
2003–2005	Athletic Bilbao	36	(2)
2005–2006	Castellón	32	(7)
2006	Ciudad Murcia	9	(0)
2007	Aris	12	(0)
2007–2008	Ibiza	29	(4)
2009	Huesca	20	(0)
2009–2010	Lleida	35	(3)
2010–2011	Écija	34	(5)
2011–2012	Guadalajara	40	(3)
2012–2013	Alavés	34	(2)
2013–2014	Kalloni	20	(3)
2015	Othellos Athienou	6	(0)
Total		399	(49)

International career
1999	Spain U16	2	(0)
2001	Spain U17	4	(2)
2001–2002	Spain U19	10	(4)
2003	Spain U20	4	(2)
2004	Spain U21	1	(1)
- * Club domestic league appearances and goals

Jon Andoni 'Jonan' García Aranbillet (born 8 January 1983) is a Spanish former professional footballer who played as a midfielder.

== Club career ==
Born in Bilbao, Biscay, García was a product of Athletic Bilbao's famed youth academy at Lezama, making his first-team debut on 30 August 2003 in a 0–1 La Liga home loss against FC Barcelona where he came on as a 76th-minute substitute. As the Basque side eventually finished fifth and qualified for the UEFA Cup, most of his appearances were made from the bench; he scored his first goal as a professional in a rare start, but in a 1–2 home defeat to Racing de Santander also at San Mamés, on 30 November 2003.

García featured even less in the 2004–05 season, being released subsequently and spending two years in the Segunda División, with CD Castellón and Ciudad de Murcia. He did not finish 2006–07 in Spain, having a six-month spell with Aris Thessaloniki F.C. in the Super League Greece.

García then returned to his country and played in the Segunda División B, with SE Eivissa-Ibiza, his solid performances earning him a return to the second division in January 2009 where he was very important in helping SD Huesca to retain their league status, 57 years after the last visit.

In the following years, García resumed his career in the third tier, returning to division two for 2011–12 with CD Guadalajara. He moved back to the former league the following campaign, being crowned champion with Deportivo Alavés.

== Honours ==
Alavés

- Segunda División B: 2012–13

Spain U19

- UEFA European Under-19 Championship: 2002
