= List of Spanish football transfers summer 2012 =

This is a list of Spanish football transfers for the summer sale in the 2012–13 season of La Liga and Segunda División. Only moves from La Liga and Segunda División are listed.

The summer transfer window opened on 1 July 2012, and closed at midnight on 31 August 2012.

== Summer 2012 La Liga transfer window ==
Date	Name	Moving from	Moving to	Fee
6 May 2012	(Spain) Jonathan Viera	(Spain) UD Las Palmas	(Spain) Valencia CF	€2.5m
21 May 2012	(Ivory Coast) Arouna Koné	(Spain) Sevilla FC	(Spain) Levante UD	Free
22 May 2012	(Spain) Diego López	(Spain) Villarreal CF	(Spain) Sevilla FC	€3m
24 May 2012	(Portugal) João Pereira	(Portugal) Sporting CP	(Spain) Valencia CF	€3.7m
28 May 2012	(Mexico) Andrés Guardado	(Spain) Deportivo de La Coruña	(Spain) Valencia CF	Free
28 May 2012	(Uruguay) Cristian Rodríguez	(Portugal) F.C. Porto	(Spain) Atlético Madrid	Free
29 May 2012	(Turkey) Emre Belözoğlu	(Turkey) Fenerbahçe SK	(Spain) Atlético Madrid	Free
29 May 2012	(Argentina) David Abraham	(Switzerland) FC Basel	(Spain) Getafe CF	Free
29 May 2012	(Spain) Ángel Lafita	(Spain) Real Zaragoza	(Spain) Getafe CF	Free
1 June 2012	(Uruguay) Chori Castro	(Spain) RCD Mallorca	(Spain) Real Sociedad	Free
1 June 2012	(Spain) Javi Venta	(Spain) Levante UD	(Spain) Villarreal CF	Free
1 June 2012	(Brazil) Henrique	(Brazil) Sociedade Esportiva Palmeiras	(Spain) FC Barcelona	Loan return
1 June 2012	(Brazil) Henrique	(Spain) FC Barcelona	(Brazil) Sociedade Esportiva Palmeiras	Free
2 June 2012	(Spain) Iván Marcano	(Greece) Olympiacos F.C.	(Spain) Villarreal CF	Loan return
2 June 2012	(Spain) Iván Marcano	(Spain) Villarreal CF	(Russia) FC Rubin Kazan	€6m
4 June 2012	(Netherlands) Hedwiges Maduro	(Spain) Valencia CF	(Spain) Sevilla FC	Free
5 June 2012	(Netherlands) Berry Powel	(Spain) Huracán Valencia CF	(Spain) Elche CF	Loan return
5 June 2012	(Spain) Nano	(Spain) CD Numancia	(Spain) CA Osasuna	Free
6 June 2012	(Spain) Martí Riverola	(Spain) FC Barcelona B	(Italy) Bologna F.C. 1909	Free
9 June 2012	(Portugal) André Santos	(Portugal) Sporting CP	(Spain) Deportivo de La Coruña	Loan
9 June 2012	(Spain) Rubén Pérez	(Spain) Getafe CF	(Spain) Atlético Madrid	Loan return
9 June 2012	(Spain) Rubén Pérez	(Spain) Atlético Madrid	(Spain) Real Betis	Loan
13 June 2012	(Spain) Carlos García	(Spain) UD Almería	(Israel) Maccabi Tel Aviv F.C.	Free
13 June 2012	(Spain) David López	(Spain) CD Leganés	(Spain) RCD Espanyol	Loan return
13 June 2012	(Spain) David López	(Spain) RCD Espanyol	(Spain) SD Huesca	Loan
13 June 2012	(Spain) Francisco Regalón	(Spain) Atlético Madrid B	(Spain) CD Numancia	Free
13 June 2012	(Spain) Quini	(Spain) Lucena CF	(Spain) Real Madrid Castilla	Free
13 June 2012	(Spain) Borja Gómez	(Spain) Granada CF	(Ukraine) FC Karpaty Lviv	Loan return
13 June 2012	(Spain) Borja Gómez	(Ukraine) FC Karpaty Lviv	(Spain) Granada CF	€0.8m
13 June 2012	(Portugal) Diogo Salomão	(Portugal) Sporting CP	(Spain) Deportivo de La Coruña	Loan
13 June 2012	(Romania) Gabriel Torje	(Italy) Udinese Calcio	(Spain) Granada CF	Loan
14 June 2012	(Spain) Raúl Tamudo	(Spain) Rayo Vallecano	(Mexico) C.F. Pachuca	Free
14 June 2012	(Spain) Aritz Borda	(Spain) Recreativo de Huelva	(Cyprus) APOEL F.C.	Free
15 June 2012	(Spain) Biel Ribas	(Spain) CD Atlético Baleares	(Spain) CD Numancia	Free
15 June 2012	(Colombia) Luis Perea	(Spain) Atlético Madrid	(Mexico) Cruz Azul	Free
15 June 2012	(Spain) Ángel Rodríguez	(Spain) Elche CF	(Spain) Levante UD	Free
15 June 2012	(Argentina) Cata Díaz	(Spain) Getafe CF	(Spain) Atlético Madrid	€1m
16 June 2012	(Spain) Ángel Dealbert	(Spain) Valencia CF	(Russia) FC Kuban Krasnodar	Free
16 June 2012	(Ecuador) Jefferson Montero	(Spain) Real Betis	(Spain) Villarreal CF	Loan return
16 June 2012	(Ecuador) Jefferson Montero	(Spain) Villarreal CF	(Mexico) Monarcas Morelia	€3m
17 June 2012	(Spain) David Santander	(Spain) Recreativo de Huelva	(Spain) Algeciras CF	Free
18 June 2012	(Spain) Nauzet Alemán	(Spain) Real Valladolid	(Spain) UD Las Palmas	Free
18 June 2012	(Spain) Jonatan Valle	(Russia) FC Rubin Kazan	(Spain) Recreativo de Huelva	Free
20 June 2012	(Cameroon) Allan Nyom	(Italy) Udinese Calcio	(Spain) Granada CF	Loan
20 June 2012	(Spain) Sergio Fernández	(Spain) CA Osasuna	(Spain) Sporting de Gijón	Free
20 June 2012	(Spain) Juanma Marrero	(Spain) Real Oviedo	(Spain) CD Numancia	Free
20 June 2012	(Spain) Sisi	(Spain) Real Valladolid	(Spain) CA Osasuna	Free
20 June 2012	(Spain) Diego Mainz	(Italy) Udinese Calcio	(Spain) Granada CF	Loan
20 June 2012	(Spain) Dani Benítez	(Italy) Udinese Calcio	(Spain) Granada CF	Loan
21 June 2012	(Spain) Víctor Espasandín	(Spain) Montañeros CF	(Spain) CE Sabadell FC	Free
21 June 2012	(Spain) Rubén Suárez	(Spain) Levante UD	(China) Guizhou Renhe F.C.	Free
22 June 2012	(Spain) Mandi	(Spain) Real Madrid Castilla	(Spain) Sporting de Gijón	Free
22 June 2012	(France) Yohan Mollo	(France) AS Nancy	(Spain) Granada CF	Loan return
22 June 2012	(France) Yohan Mollo	(Spain) Granada CF	(France) AS Nancy	€2m
22 June 2012	(Argentina) Diego Colotto	(Spain) Deportivo de La Coruña	(Spain) RCD Espanyol	Free
23 June 2012	(Spain) Joselu	(Spain) Villarreal CF B	(Spain) Córdoba CF	Loan
24 June 2012	(Spain) Adrián Mouriño	(Spain) CD Ourense	(Spain) Recreativo de Huelva	Free
24 June 2012	(Spain) Ángel Montoro	(Spain) Valencia CF Mestalla	(Spain) Recreativo de Huelva	Free
25 June 2012	(Paraguay) Paulo da Silva	(Spain) Real Zaragoza	(Mexico) C.F. Pachuca	Free
25 June 2012	(Spain) Jonathan Collado	(Spain) CE Sabadell FC	(Spain) FC Santboià	Free
26 June 2012	(Spain) Bruno Saltor	(Spain) Valencia CF	(England) Brighton & Hove Albion F.C.	Free
26 June 2012	(Spain) Ismael López	(Spain) CD Lugo	(Spain) Athletic Bilbao	Free
26 June 2012	(Spain) Antonio López	(Spain) Atlético Madrid	(Spain) RCD Mallorca	Free
26 June 2012	(Spain) Nano	(Spain) Real Oviedo	(Spain) SD Ponferradina	Free
26 June 2012	(Spain) Míchel Herrero	(Spain) Hércules CF	(Spain) Valencia CF	Loan return
26 June 2012	(Spain) Míchel Herrero	(Spain) Valencia CF	(Spain) Levante UD	Free
26 June 2012	(Spain) Aritz Aduriz	(Spain) Valencia CF	(Spain) Athletic Bilbao	€2m
26 June 2012	(Spain) Álvaro Domínguez	(Spain) Atlético Madrid	(Germany) Borussia Mönchengladbach	€8m
27 June 2012	(Spain) Joan Àngel Román	(England) Manchester City F.C.	(Spain) FC Barcelona B	Free
27 June 2012	(Spain) Toño	(Spain) Racing de Santander	(Spain) Granada CF	Free
27 June 2012	(Spain) Urtzi Iturrioz	(Spain) SD Ponferradina	(Spain) Deportivo Alavés	Free
27 June 2012	(Italy) Floro Flores	(Italy) Udinese Calcio	(Spain) Granada CF	Loan
27 June 2012	(Belgium) Thibaut Courtois	(England) Chelsea F.C.	(Spain) Atlético Madrid	Loan
28 June 2012	(Spain) Miguel Ángel Moyà	(Spain) Getafe CF	(Spain) Valencia CF	Loan return
28 June 2012	(Spain) Miguel Ángel Moyà	(Spain) Valencia CF	(Spain) Getafe CF	€1.8m
28 June 2012	(Spain) Jordi Alba	(Spain) Valencia CF	(Spain) FC Barcelona	€14m
28 June 2012	(Belgium) Marvin Ogunjimi	(Spain) RCD Mallorca	(Belgium) Standard Liège	Loan
28 June 2012	(Spain) Alejandro Arribas	(Spain) Rayo Vallecano	(Spain) CA Osasuna	Free
28 June 2012	(Spain) Javi Varas	(Spain) Sevilla FC	(Spain) Celta de Vigo	Loan
28 June 2012	(Spain) Yuri Berchiche	(Spain) Real Unión	(Spain) Real Sociedad	Free
28 June 2012	(Spain) Yuri Berchiche	(Spain) Real Sociedad	(Spain) SD Eibar	Loan
29 June 2012	(Spain) Albert Dorca	(Spain) Girona FC	(Spain) Racing de Santander	Free
29 June 2012	(Spain) Manu Herrera	(Spain) AD Alcorcón	(Spain) Elche CF	Free
29 June 2012	(Spain) Manuel Gato	(Spain) CD Alcoyano	(Spain) CE Sabadell FC	Free
29 June 2012	(Turkey) Mehmet Topal	(Spain) Valencia CF	(Turkey) Fenerbahçe S.K.	€4.5m
29 June 2012	(Spain) Isaac Becerra	(Spain) Real Madrid Castilla	(Spain) Girona FC	Free
29 June 2012	(Spain) Asier Goiria	(Spain) Girona FC	(Spain) CD Mirandés	Free
30 June 2012	(Mali) Frédéric Kanouté	(Spain) Sevilla FC	(China) Beijing Guoan F.C.	Free
1 July 2012	(Spain) Iñigo Díaz de Cerio	(Spain) CD Numancia	(Spain) Athletic Bilbao	Loan return
1 July 2012	(Spain) Ustaritz Aldekoaotalora	(Spain) Real Betis	(Spain) Athletic Bilbao	Loan return
1 July 2012	(Spain) Galder Cerrajería	(Spain) Real Murcia	(Spain) Athletic Bilbao	Loan return
1 July 2012	(Spain) Pablo Orbaiz	(Greece) Olympiacos F.C.	(Spain) Athletic Bilbao	Loan return
1 July 2012	(Spain) Mikel Orbegozo	(Spain) Gimnàstic de Tarragona	(Spain) Bilbao Athletic	Loan return
1 July 2012	(Spain) Gorka Eraña	(Spain) Barakaldo CF	(Spain) Bilbao Athletic	Loan return
1 July 2012	(Spain) Joel Robles	(Spain) Rayo Vallecano	(Spain) Atlético Madrid	Loan return
1 July 2012	(Brazil) Diego Costa	(Spain) Rayo Vallecano	(Spain) Atlético Madrid	Loan return
1 July 2012	(Spain) Jorge Pulido	(Spain) Rayo Vallecano	(Spain) Atlético Madrid	Loan return
1 July 2012	(Spain) Raúl García	(Spain) CA Osasuna	(Spain) Atlético Madrid	Loan return
1 July 2012	(Portugal) Rúben Micael	(Spain) Real Zaragoza	(Spain) Atlético Madrid	Loan return
1 July 2012	(Uruguay) Leandro Cabrera	(Spain) CD Numancia	(Spain) Atlético Madrid	Loan return
1 July 2012	(Brazil) Diego Ribas	(Spain) Atlético Madrid	(Germany) VfL Wolfsburg	Loan return
1 July 2012	(Portugal) Pizzi	(Spain) Atlético Madrid	(Portugal) S.C. Braga	Loan return
1 July 2012	(Spain) Dani Pacheco	(Spain) Rayo Vallecano	(Spain) Atlético Madrid	Loan return
1 July 2012	(Spain) Dani Pacheco	(Spain) Atlético Madrid	(England) Liverpool F.C.	Loan return
1 July 2012	(Portugal) Salvador Agra	(Portugal) S.C. Olhanense	(Spain) Real Betis	Loan return
1 July 2012	(Spain) Juan Calahorro	(Spain) Xerez CD	(Spain) Real Betis	Loan return
1 July 2012	(Spain) Ezequiel Calvente	(Spain) CE Sabadell FC	(Spain) Real Betis	Loan return
1 July 2012	(Paraguay) Roque Santa Cruz	(Spain) Real Betis	(England) Manchester City F.C.	Loan return
1 July 2012	(Brazil) Paulão Santos	(Spain) Real Betis	(France) AS Saint-Étienne	Loan return
1 July 2012	(Spain) Dani Abalo	(Spain) Gimnàstic de Tarragona	(Spain) Celta de Vigo	Loan return
1 July 2012	(Greece) Dimitrios Papadopoulos	(Greece) Levadiakos F.C.	(Spain) Celta de Vigo	Loan return
1 July 2012	(Chile) Fabián Orellana	(Spain) Celta de Vigo	(Spain) Granada CF	Loan return
1 July 2012	(Spain) Catú	(Spain) Real Oviedo	(Spain) Celta de Vigo B	Loan return
1 July 2012	(Spain) Oier Sanjurjo	(Spain) Celta de Vigo	(Spain) CA Osasuna	Loan return
1 July 2012	(Spain) Félix Rial	(Spain) Alondras CF	(Spain) Celta de Vigo B	Loan return
1 July 2012	(Spain) Raúl García	(Spain) UD Melilla	(Spain) Deportivo de La Coruña	Loan return
1 July 2012	(Spain) Borja Fernández	(Spain) Deportivo de La Coruña	(Spain) Getafe CF	Loan return
1 July 2012	(Spain) Xisco	(Spain) Deportivo de La Coruña	(England) Newcastle United F.C.	Loan return
1 July 2012	(Spain) Felipe Ramos	(Spain) RCD Mallorca B	(Spain) Deportivo de La Coruña	Loan return
1 July 2012	(Israel) Ben Sahar	(France) AJ Auxerre	(Spain) RCD Espanyol	Loan return
1 July 2012	(Spain) Manu Molina	(Spain) SD Huesca	(Spain) RCD Espanyol	Loan return
1 July 2012	(Uruguay) Adrián Luna	(Spain) CE Sabadell FC	(Spain) RCD Espanyol	Loan return
1 July 2012	(Spain) Dani Nieto	(Spain) Girona FC	(Spain) RCD Espanyol	Loan return
1 July 2012	(Spain) Dídac Vilà	(Spain) RCD Espanyol	(Italy) A.C. Milan	Loan return
1 July 2012	(Brazil) Philippe Coutinho	(Spain) RCD Espanyol	(Italy) Inter Milan	Loan return
1 July 2012	(Slovakia) Vladimír Weiss	(Spain) RCD Espanyol	(England) Manchester City F.C.	Loan return
1 July 2012	(Mexico) Taufic Guarch	(Spain) RCD Espanyol	(Mexico) Estudiantes Tecos	Loan return
1 July 2012	(Ivory Coast) Romaric	(Spain) RCD Espanyol	(Spain) Sevilla FC	Loan return
1 July 2012	(Spain) Adrián Sardinero	(Spain) Hércules CF	(Spain) Getafe CF	Loan return
1 July 2012	(Spain) Alberto Escassi	(Spain) Hércules CF	(Spain) Getafe CF	Loan return
1 July 2012	(Spain) Pedro Mosquera	(Spain) Real Madrid Castilla	(Spain) Getafe CF	Loan return
1 July 2012	(Uruguay) Pablo Pintos	(Uruguay) Defensor Sporting	(Spain) Getafe CF	Loan return
1 July 2012	(Spain) Adrián Colunga	(Spain) Sporting de Gijón	(Spain) Getafe CF	Loan return
1 July 2012	(South Africa) Tsepo Masilela	(Spain) Getafe CF	(Israel) Maccabi Haifa F.C.	Loan return
1 July 2012	(Spain) David de Coz	(Spain) Cádiz CF	(Spain) Granada CF	Loan return
1 July 2012	(Colombia) Jeison Murillo	(Spain) Cádiz CF	(Spain) Granada CF	Loan return
1 July 2012	(Spain) Rafael Martínez	(Spain) Montañeros CF	(Spain) Granada CF	Loan return
1 July 2012	(Ghana) Aziz Tetteh	(Spain) Montañeros CF	(Spain) Granada CF	Loan return
1 July 2012	(Spain) Héctor Yuste	(Spain) Cádiz CF	(Spain) Granada CF	Loan return
1 July 2012	(Nigeria) Kabiru Akinsola	(Spain) Cádiz CF	(Spain) Granada CF	Loan return
1 July 2012	(Scotland) Ikechi Anya	(Spain) Cádiz CF	(Spain) Granada CF	Loan return
1 July 2012	(Spain) Álex Goikoetxea	(Spain) Cádiz CF	(Spain) Granada CF	Loan return
1 July 2012	(Spain) Juanjo Serrano	(Spain) Cádiz CF	(Spain) Granada CF	Loan return
1 July 2012	(Spain) Óscar Pérez	(Spain) Cádiz CF	(Spain) Granada CF	Loan return
1 July 2012	(Spain) Toti	(Spain) Cádiz CF	(Spain) Granada CF	Loan return
1 July 2012	(Spain) José María Cases	(Spain) Cádiz CF	(Spain) Granada CF	Loan return
1 July 2012	(Spain) Pedro Barrancos	(Spain) CF La Unión	(Spain) Granada CF	Loan return
1 July 2012	(Spain) Goku	(Spain) RSD Alcalá	(Spain) Granada CF B	Loan return
1 July 2012	(Spain) Álex Cruz	(Spain) CE Sabadell FC	(Spain) Granada CF	Loan return
1 July 2012	(Chile) Matías Campos	(Chile) Universidad Católica	(Spain) Granada CF	Loan return
1 July 2012	(Brazil) Gabriel Silva	(Italy) Novara Calcio	(Spain) Granada CF	Loan return
1 July 2012	(Switzerland) Silvan Widmer	(Switzerland) FC Aarau	(Spain) Granada CF	Loan return
1 July 2012	(Spain) Jaime Romero	(Spain) Granada CF	(Italy) Udinese Calcio	Loan return
1 July 2012	(Nigeria) Odion Ighalo	(Spain) Granada CF	(Italy) Udinese Calcio	Loan return
1 July 2012	(Switzerland) Alex Geijo	(Spain) Granada CF	(Italy) Udinese Calcio	Loan return
1 July 2012	(Portugal) Carlos Martins	(Spain) Granada CF	(Portugal) S.L. Benfica	Loan return
1 July 2012	(Brazil) Júlio César	(Spain) Granada CF	(Portugal) S.L. Benfica	Loan return
1 July 2012	(Argentina) Franco Jara	(Spain) Granada CF	(Portugal) S.L. Benfica	Loan return
1 July 2012	(Nigeria) Ikechukwu Uche	(Spain) Granada CF	(Spain) Villarreal CF	Loan return
1 July 2012	(Brazil) Henrique Almeida	(Spain) Granada CF	(Brazil) São Paulo FC	Loan return
1 July 2012	(Spain) Héctor Rodas	(Spain) Elche CF	(Spain) Levante UD	Loan return
1 July 2012	(Spain) Marc Mateu	(Spain) Real Zaragoza B	(Spain) Levante UD	Loan return
1 July 2012	(Brazil) Pedro Botelho	(Spain) Levante UD	(England) Arsenal F.C.	Loan return
1 July 2012	(Algeria) Abdelkader Ghezzal	(Spain) Levante UD	(Italy) A.S. Bari	Loan return
1 July 2012	(Costa Rica) Keylor Navas	(Spain) Levante UD	(Spain) Albacete Balompié	Loan return
1 July 2012	(Argentina) Gustavo Cabral	(Spain) Levante UD	(Argentina) Arsenal de Sarandí	Loan return
1 July 2012	(Spain) Xavi Torres	(Spain) Levante UD	(Spain) Málaga CF	Loan return
1 July 2012	(Spain) Javi López	(Spain) Real Jaén	(Spain) Málaga CF	Loan return
1 July 2012	(Portugal) Edinho	(Portugal) Académica Coimbra	(Spain) Málaga CF	Loan return
1 July 2012	(Spain) Apoño	(Spain) Real Zaragoza	(Spain) Málaga CF	Loan return
1 July 2012	(Brazil) Sandro Silva	(Brazil) Sport Club Internacional	(Spain) Málaga CF	Loan return
1 July 2012	(Spain) Iván González	(Spain) Real Madrid Castilla	(Spain) Málaga CF	Loan return
1 July 2012	(Spain) Sergi Enrich	(Spain) Recreativo de Huelva	(Spain) RCD Mallorca	Loan return
1 July 2012	(Spain) Ximo Navarro	(Spain) Recreativo de Huelva	(Spain) RCD Mallorca	Loan return
1 July 2012	(Japan) Akihiro Ienaga	(South Korea) Ulsan Hyundai FC	(Spain) RCD Mallorca	Loan return
1 July 2012	(Spain) Chico	(Spain) RCD Mallorca	(Italy) Genoa C.F.C.	Loan return
1 July 2012	(Argentina) Fernando Tissone	(Spain) RCD Mallorca	(Italy) U.C. Sampdoria	Loan return
1 July 2012	(Spain) Nacho Zabal	(Spain) CD Numancia	(Spain) CA Osasuna	Loan return
1 July 2012	(Spain) Rúper	(Spain) Elche CF	(Spain) CA Osasuna	Loan return
1 July 2012	(Spain) Óscar Vega	(Spain) SD Huesca	(Spain) CA Osasuna	Loan return
1 July 2012	(Finland) Jukka Raitala	(Spain) CA Osasuna	(Germany) TSG 1899 Hoffenheim	Loan return
1 July 2012	(Spain) Jokin Esparza	(Spain) SD Huesca	(Spain) CA Osasuna	Loan return
1 July 2012	(Spain) Jorge Galán	(Spain) Real Unión	(Spain) CA Osasuna	Loan return
1 July 2012	(Spain) Ekhi Senar	(Spain) Real Unión	(Spain) CA Osasuna	Loan return
1 July 2012	(Spain) Juan Quero	(Spain) Córdoba CF	(Spain) Rayo Vallecano	Loan return
1 July 2012	(Spain) Rafa García	(Spain) Xerez CD	(Spain) Rayo Vallecano	Loan return
1 July 2012	(Spain) Juli	(Greece) Asteras Tripolis	(Spain) Rayo Vallecano	Loan return
1 July 2012	(Argentina) Emiliano Armenteros	(Spain) Rayo Vallecano	(Spain) Sevilla FC	Loan return
1 July 2012	(Argentina) Fernando Gago	(Italy) A.S. Roma	(Spain) Real Madrid C.F.	Loan return
1 July 2012	(Spain) Pedro León	(Spain) Getafe CF	(Spain) Real Madrid C.F.	Loan return
1 July 2012	(Netherlands) Jeffrey Sarpong	(Netherlands) NAC Breda	(Spain) Real Sociedad	Loan return
1 July 2012	(Mexico) Carlos Vela	(Spain) Real Sociedad	(England) Arsenal F.C.	Loan return
1 July 2012	(Colombia) Bernardo Espinosa	(Spain) Racing de Santander	(Spain) Sevilla FC	Loan return
1 July 2012	(Argentina) Lautaro Acosta	(Spain) Racing de Santander	(Spain) Sevilla FC	Loan return
1 July 2012	(Spain) Javi Hervás	(Spain) Córdoba CF	(Spain) Sevilla FC	Loan return
1 July 2012	(Spain) Alexis	(Spain) Getafe CF	(Spain) Sevilla FC	Loan return
1 July 2012	(Argentina) Alejandro Domínguez	(Argentina) Club Atlético River Plate	(Spain) Valencia CF	Loan return
1 July 2012	(Honduras) Anthony Lozano	(Spain) CD Alcoyano	(Spain) Valencia CF	Loan return
1 July 2012	(Spain) Carlos Lázaro	(Spain) SD Huesca	(Spain) Real Valladolid	Loan return
1 July 2012	(Spain) Quique	(Spain) UD Logroñés	(Spain) Real Valladolid B	Loan return
1 July 2012	(Brazil) Pablo de Barros	(Brazil) Figueirense Futebol Clube	(Spain) Real Zaragoza	Loan return
1 July 2012	(Italy) Matteo Contini	(Italy) A.C. Siena	(Spain) Real Zaragoza	Loan return
1 July 2012	(Spain) Víctor Laguardia	(Spain) UD Las Palmas	(Spain) Real Zaragoza	Loan return
1 July 2012	(Spain) Toni Doblas	(Spain) Xerez CD	(Spain) Real Zaragoza	Loan return
1 July 2012	(Spain) Raúl Goni	(Spain) FC Cartagena	(Spain) Real Zaragoza	Loan return
1 July 2012	(Spain) David Mateos	(Spain) Real Zaragoza	(Spain) Real Madrid Castilla	Loan return
1 July 2012	(Mexico) Pablo Barrera	(Spain) Real Zaragoza	(England) West Ham United F.C.	Loan return
1 July 2012	(Croatia) Tomislav Dujmović	(Spain) Real Zaragoza	(Russia) FC Dynamo Moscow	Loan return
1 July 2012	(Argentina) Pablo Álvarez	(Spain) Real Zaragoza	(Italy) Calcio Catania	Loan return
1 July 2012	(Argentina) Franco Zuculini	(Spain) Real Zaragoza	(Germany) TSG 1899 Hoffenheim	Loan return
1 July 2012	(Spain) Juan Carlos Pérez	(Spain) Real Zaragoza	(Portugal) S.C. Braga	Loan return
1 July 2012	(Spain) Saúl Berjón	(Spain) AD Alcorcón	(Spain) FC Barcelona B	Loan return
1 July 2012	(Uruguay) Marcelo Silva	(Uruguay) C.A. Peñarol	(Spain) UD Almería	Loan return
1 July 2012	(Argentina) Hernán Pellerano	(Argentina) Newell's Old Boys	(Spain) UD Almería	Loan return
1 July 2012	(Spain) Juanma Ortiz	(Spain) UD Almería	(Scotland) Rangers F.C.	Loan return
1 July 2012	(Paraguay) Javier Acuña	(Spain) Girona FC	(Spain) Real Madrid Castilla	Loan return
1 July 2012	(Argentina) Sebastián Dubarbier	(Spain) Córdoba CF	(France) FC Lorient	Loan return
1 July 2012	(Spain) Francis Durán	(Spain) Orihuela CF	(Spain) Elche CF	Loan return
1 July 2012	(Spain) Juan Carlos Sánchez	(Spain) Elche CF	(Spain) Villarreal CF	Loan return
1 July 2012	(Denmark) Nicki Bille	(Spain) Elche CF	(Spain) Villarreal CF	Loan return
1 July 2012	(Spain) Cristóbal Márquez	(Spain) Elche CF	(Ukraine) FC Karpaty Lviv	Loan return
1 July 2012	(Argentina) Matías Ballini	(Spain) Girona FC	(Argentina) Rosario Central	Loan return
1 July 2012	(Spain) José Collado	(Spain) CD Guadalajara	(Portugal) S.C. Braga	Loan return
1 July 2012	(Spain) Nico González	(Spain) CD Guadalajara	(Spain) CD Tenerife	Loan return
1 July 2012	(Spain) Sergio Díaz	(Spain) Hércules CF	(Spain) Atlético Malagueño	Loan return
1 July 2012	(Bosnia and Herzegovina) Eldin Hadžić	(Spain) Valencia CF Mestalla	(Spain) Hércules CF	Loan return
1 July 2012	(Spain) Carlos Calvo	(Spain) Hércules CF	(Italy) Udinese Calcio	Loan return
1 July 2012	(Serbia) Marko Lukić	(Serbia) FK Jagodina	(Spain) SD Huesca	Loan return
1 July 2012	(Spain) David Simón	(Spain) UD Vecindario	(Spain) UD Las Palmas Atlético	Loan return
1 July 2012	(Argentina) Mauro Quiroga	(Spain) UD Las Palmas	(Argentina) Gimnasia y Esgrima de Concepción	Loan return
1 July 2012	(Spain) Liru	(Spain) CD Lugo	(Spain) Xerez CD	Loan return
1 July 2012	(Spain) Antonio Martínez	(Spain) CD Mirandés	(Spain) Real Madrid Castilla	Loan return
1 July 2012	(Spain) Roberto Ubis	(Spain) CD Anguiano	(Spain) CD Mirandés	Loan return
1 July 2012	(Spain) José Ángel Jurado	(Spain) CD Mirandés	(Spain) Villarreal CF C	Loan return
1 July 2012	(Spain) Urzáiz	(Spain) SD Ponferradina	(Spain) Real Murcia	Loan return
1 July 2012	(Spain) Borja González	(Spain) Real Murcia	(Spain) Atlético Madrid B	Loan return
1 July 2012	(Spain) Diego Antón	(Spain) Arandina CF	(Spain) CD Numancia	Loan return
1 July 2012	(Spain) Borja Valle	(Spain) Celta de Vigo B	(Spain) SD Ponferradina	Loan return
1 July 2012	(Uruguay) Christian Stuani	(Spain) Racing de Santander	(Italy) Reggina Calcio	Loan return
1 July 2012	(Equatorial Guinea) Daniel Ekedo	(Spain) AD Ceuta	(Spain) Recreativo de Huelva	Loan return
1 July 2012	(Spain) Guillermo Méndez	(Spain) Marino de Luanco	(Spain) Sporting de Gijón	Loan return
1 July 2012	(Spain) Luis Morán	(Cyprus) AEK Larnaca F.C.	(Spain) Sporting de Gijón	Loan return
1 July 2012	(Portugal) André Castro	(Spain) Sporting de Gijón	(Portugal) F.C. Porto	Loan return
1 July 2012	(Argentina) Alejandro Martinuccio	(Spain) Villarreal CF	(Brazil) Fluminense Football Club	Loan return
1 July 2012	(Spain) Adri Cuevas	(Spain) Valencia CF Mestalla	(Spain) Xerez CD	Loan return
1 July 2012	(Spain) Borja Perea	(Spain) CD San Roque de Lepe	(Spain) Xerez CD	Loan return
1 July 2012	(Spain) Álvaro Silva	(Romania) FC Petrolul Ploiești	(Spain) Xerez CD	Loan return
1 July 2012	(Spain) Javi Flores	(Spain) Getafe CF B	(Spain) Elche CF	Free
1 July 2012	(Spain) Iago Herrerín	(Spain) Atlético Madrid B	(Spain) Athletic Bilbao	Free
1 July 2012	(Spain) Iago Herrerín	(Spain) Athletic Bilbao	(Spain) CD Numancia	Loan
1 July 2012	(Spain) Alexis	(Spain) Sevilla FC	(Spain) Getafe CF	Loan
1 July 2012	(Spain) Pedro León	(Spain) Real Madrid C.F.	(Spain) Getafe CF	Loan
1 July 2012	(Bolivia) Carlos Arias	(Spain) Córdoba CF	(Bolivia) Oriente Petrolero	Free
2 July 2012	(Spain) Juan José Collantes	(Spain) FC Cartagena	(Spain) CE Sabadell FC	Free
2 July 2012	(Spain) Javi Márquez	(Spain) RCD Espanyol	(Spain) RCD Mallorca	€1.2m
2 July 2012	(Spain) Sergio Tejera	(Spain) RCD Mallorca	(Spain) RCD Espanyol	Free
2 July 2012	(Mexico) Aníbal Zurdo	(Spain) CD Guadalajara	(Spain) CE Sabadell FC	Free
2 July 2012	(Spain) Iñigo Díaz de Cerio	(Spain) Athletic Bilbao	(Spain) CD Mirandés	Free
2 July 2012	(Spain) Jorge Morcillo	(Spain) CD Alcoyano	(Spain) Recreativo de Huelva	Free
2 July 2012	(Costa Rica) Joel Campbell	(England) Arsenal F.C.	(Spain) Real Betis	Loan
2 July 2012	(Spain) Felipe Ramos	(Spain) Deportivo de La Coruña	(Spain) Valencia CF Mestalla	Loan
3 July 2012	(Spain) Miguel Escalona	(Spain) CD Lugo	(Spain) CD Guadalajara	Free
3 July 2012	(Serbia) Dejan Lekić	(Spain) CA Osasuna	(Turkey) Gençlerbirliği S.K.	Free
3 July 2012	(Spain) Chus Herrero	(Spain) FC Cartagena	(Spain) Girona FC	Free
4 July 2012	(Spain) Álex García	(Spain) CF Badalona	(Spain) CD Guadalajara	Free
4 July 2012	(Spain) César Soriano	(Spain) CF Badalona	(Spain) CD Guadalajara	Free
4 July 2012	(Spain) Ángel Javier Arizmendi	(Spain) Getafe CF	(Spain) RCD Mallorca	Free
4 July 2012	(Spain) Agustín Fernández	(Spain) CE Sabadell FC	(Spain) Deportivo Alavés	Free
4 July 2012	(Spain) Manolo González	(Spain) Atlético Sanluqueño CF	(Spain) Real Betis	Free
4 July 2012	(Spain) Manolo González	(Spain) Real Betis	(Spain) Atlético Sanluqueño CF	Loan
4 July 2012	(Spain) Juan Carlos Pérez	(Portugal) S.C. Braga	(Spain) Real Betis	Loan
4 July 2012	(Spain) Deivid Omar	(Spain) Sevilla FC	(Spain) UD Las Palmas	Free
5 July 2012	(Spain) Eneko Satrústegui	(Spain) CA Osasuna	(Spain) CD Numancia	Loan
5 July 2012	(Spain) Kike Tortosa	(Spain) Burgos CF	(Spain) CD Guadalajara	Free
5 July 2012	(Spain) Luis García	(Spain) Real Zaragoza	(Mexico) Tigres de la UANL	Loan
5 July 2012	(Argentina) Emiliano Armenteros	(Spain) Sevilla FC	(Spain) CA Osasuna	Free
5 July 2012	(Spain) Rubén Miño	(Spain) FC Barcelona B	(Spain) RCD Mallorca	Free
5 July 2012	(Spain) Iván Crespo	(Spain) Gimnástica de Torrelavega	(Spain) CD Mirandés	Free
5 July 2012	(Spain) José Carlos Fernández	(Greece) AEK Athens F.C.	(Spain) Rayo Vallecano	Free
5 July 2012	(Spain) Borja Viguera	(Spain) Real Sociedad	(Spain) Deportivo Alavés	Free
5 July 2012	(Spain) Paco Montañés	(Spain) AD Alcorcón	(Spain) Real Zaragoza	€0.5m
6 July 2012	(Argentina) Franco Zuculini	(Germany) TSG 1899 Hoffenheim	(Spain) Real Zaragoza	Free
6 July 2012	(Spain) Nacho Zabal	(Spain) CA Osasuna	(Spain) SD Huesca	Loan
6 July 2012	(Spain) David Barral	(Spain) Sporting de Gijón	(Turkey) Orduspor	€3m
6 July 2012	(Spain) Eloi Amagat	(Spain) UE Llagostera	(Spain) Girona FC	Free
6 July 2012	(Spain) Marc Serramitja	(Spain) CF Badalona	(Spain) Girona FC	Free
6 July 2012	(Spain) Marc Serramitja	(Spain) Girona FC	(Spain) UE Llagostera	Loan
6 July 2012	(Uruguay) Diego Riolfo	(Uruguay) Montevideo Wanderers F.C.	(Spain) Recreativo de Huelva	Loan
6 July 2012	(Spain) Raúl García	(Spain) Deportivo de La Coruña	(Spain) UD Almería B	Free
6 July 2012	(Spain) Koikili Lertxundi	(Spain) Athletic Bilbao	(Spain) CD Mirandés	Free
6 July 2012	(Spain) Pedro Ríos	(Spain) Getafe CF	(Spain) Levante UD	Free
6 July 2012	(Spain) Dani García	(Spain) Getafe CF B	(Spain) Real Sociedad	Free
6 July 2012	(Spain) Dani García	(Spain) Real Sociedad	(Spain) SD Eibar	Loan
6 July 2012	(Argentina) Gonzalo Castellani	(Spain) Villarreal CF	(Argentina) Godoy Cruz Antonio Tomba	Free
6 July 2012	(Spain) Pelayo Novo	(Spain) Real Oviedo	(Spain) Elche CF	Free
7 July 2012	(Spain) Manuel Rueda	(Spain) AD Alcorcón	(Spain) FC Cartagena	Free
7 July 2012	(Costa Rica) Keylor Navas	(Spain) Albacete Balompié	(Spain) Levante UD	€0.15m
7 July 2012	(Spain) Nauzet Pérez	(Spain) CD Mirandés	(Spain) CE Sabadell FC	Free
7 July 2012	(Spain) Samuel Llorca	(Spain) Hércules CF	(Spain) Celta de Vigo	€0.45m
7 July 2012	(Spain) Marc Martínez	(Spain) UE Sant Andreu	(Spain) SD Huesca	Free
8 July 2012	(Spain) Ander Lafuente	(Spain) FC Cartagena	(Spain) SD Ponferradina	Free
8 July 2012	(Spain) Armando Lozano	(Spain) FC Barcelona B	(Mexico) Tiburones Rojos de Veracruz	Free
8 July 2012	(Mali) Seydou Keita	(Spain) FC Barcelona	(China) Dalian Aerbin F.C.	Free
8 July 2012	(Brazil) Iriney Santos	(Spain) Real Betis	(Spain) Granada CF	Free
8 July 2012	(Spain) Alberto Narvajas	(Spain) CD Numancia	(Spain) UD Logroñés	Free
8 July 2012	(Portugal) Edinho	(Spain) Málaga CF	(Portugal) Académica Coimbra	Loan
9 July 2012	(Spain) Dimas Delgado	(Spain) FC Cartagena	(Spain) Recreativo de Huelva	Free
9 July 2012	(Spain) Álvaro Zazo	(Spain) CD Tenerife	(Spain) CD Guadalajara	Free
9 July 2012	(Spain) Vicente Pérez	(Spain) CD Leganés	(Spain) CD Guadalajara	Free
9 July 2012	(Brazil) Paulão Santos	(France) AS Saint-Étienne	(Spain) Real Betis	Free
9 July 2012	(Colombia) Brayan Angulo	(Spain) CD Atlético Baleares	(Spain) Granada CF	Free
9 July 2012	(Spain) Fernando Llorente	(Spain) Villarreal CF B	(Spain) CE Sabadell FC	Free
9 July 2012	(Spain) Juanma Ortiz	(Scotland) Rangers F.C.	(Spain) Granada CF	Free
9 July 2012	(Spain) José Antonio Espín	(Spain) SD Eibar	(Spain) CD Guadalajara	Free
9 July 2012	(Spain) Javier Carpio	(Spain) Elche CF	(Spain) SD Ponferradina	Free
9 July 2012	(Spain) Christian Fernández	(Spain) Racing de Santander	(Spain) UD Almería	Free
9 July 2012	(Spain) Rafel Sastre	(Spain) SD Huesca	(Spain) CD Atlético Baleares	Free
9 July 2012	(France) Florian Taulemesse	(Spain) CE Sabadell FC	(Spain) FC Cartagena	Free
9 July 2012	(Spain) Aitor Fernández	(Spain) CD Lugo	(Spain) CD Guadalajara	Free
10 July 2012	(Spain) Igor Gabilondo	(Spain) Athletic Bilbao	(Cyprus) AEK Larnaca F.C.	Free
10 July 2012	(Spain) Javier Gallardo	(Spain) CD Numancia	(Spain) CD Tudelano	Loan
10 July 2012	(France) John Ayina	(France) US Quevilly	(Spain) Córdoba CF	Free
10 July 2012	(Spain) Gorka Azkorra	(Spain) Deportivo Alavés	(Spain) CD Guadalajara	Free
10 July 2012	(Canada) Jonathan de Guzmán	(Spain) Villarreal CF	(Wales) Swansea City A.F.C.	Loan
10 July 2012	(Spain) Adrián Sardinero	(Spain) Getafe CF	(Spain) Hércules CF	Free
10 July 2012	(Spain) Alberto Escassi	(Spain) Getafe CF	(Spain) Hércules CF	Free
10 July 2012	(Denmark) Nicki Bille	(Spain) Villarreal CF	(Spain) Rayo Vallecano	Loan
10 July 2012	(Spain) Mikel Saizar	(Spain) CD Guadalajara	(Spain) Córdoba CF	Free
10 July 2012	(Argentina) Damián Petkoff	(Spain) Real Betis B	(Spain) Córdoba CF	Free
11 July 2012	(Brazil) Charles Dias	(Spain) Córdoba CF	(Spain) UD Almería	Free
11 July 2012	(Argentina) Alexander Szymanowski	(Spain) RSD Alcalá	(Spain) Recreativo de Huelva	Free
11 July 2012	(Spain) Dani Carvajal	(Spain) Real Madrid Castilla	(Germany) Bayer 04 Leverkusen	€5m
11 July 2012	(Spain) David Lombán	(Spain) Xerez CD	(Spain) FC Barcelona B	Free
11 July 2012	(Argentina) José Acciari	(Spain) Girona FC	(Spain) Real Murcia	Free
11 July 2012	(Ghana) Wakaso Mubarak	(Spain) Villarreal CF	(Spain) RCD Espanyol	€0.3m
11 July 2012	(Spain) Álvaro González	(Spain) Racing de Santander	(Spain) Real Zaragoza	€1m
11 July 2012	(Spain) Aitor Tornavaca	(Spain) Recreativo de Huelva	(Spain) Real Avilés	Free
11 July 2012	(Spain) Antonio Longás	(Spain) Gimnàstic de Tarragona	(Spain) Racing de Santander	Free
11 July 2012	(Israel) Gai Assulin	(England) Manchester City F.C.	(Spain) Racing de Santander	Free
11 July 2012	(Spain) Sebastián Corona	(Spain) SD Huesca	(Spain) CD Leganés	Free
11 July 2012	(Spain) Fidel Chaves	(Spain) Recreativo de Huelva	(Spain) Elche CF	Free
11 July 2012	(Spain) Héctor Yuste	(Spain) Granada CF	(Spain) Racing de Santander	Loan
11 July 2012	(Spain) Adrián González	(Spain) Racing de Santander	(Spain) Rayo Vallecano	Free
11 July 2012	(Argentina) Marco Ruben	(Spain) Villarreal CF	(Ukraine) FC Dynamo Kyiv	€10m
12 July 2012	(Spain) Fernando Seoane	(Spain) Gimnàstic de Tarragona	(Spain) CD Lugo	Free
12 July 2012	(Spain) Néstor Susaeta	(Switzerland) FC Lausanne-Sport	(Spain) CD Guadalajara	Free
12 July 2012	(Tunisia) Mehdi Nafti	(Spain) Real Valladolid	(Spain) Real Murcia	Free
12 July 2012	(Portugal) Pizzi	(Portugal) S.C. Braga	(Spain) Deportivo de La Coruña	Loan
12 July 2012	(Spain) Ariday Cabrera	(Spain) RCD Mallorca B	(Spain) Girona FC	Free
12 July 2012	(Spain) Gaizka Saizar	(Spain) Girona FC	(Spain) Racing de Santander	Free
12 July 2012	(Spain) Iñaki Goitia	(Spain) Real Betis	(Spain) CD Mirandés	Free
12 July 2012	(Spain) Luciano González	(Spain) Real Murcia	(Spain) Deportivo Alavés	Free
12 July 2012	(Spain) Agus	(Spain) AD Alcorcón	(Turkey) Orduspor	Free
12 July 2012	(Spain) Martí Crespí	(Spain) RCD Mallorca	(Ukraine) FC Chornomorets Odesa	Free
13 July 2012	(Uruguay) Pablo Pintos	(Spain) Getafe CF	(Turkey) Kasımpaşa Spor Kulübü	Free
13 July 2012	(Spain) Ismael Bolívar	(Spain) Córdoba CF	(Spain) CD Guijuelo	Loan
13 July 2012	(Turkey) Hamit Altıntop	(Spain) Real Madrid C.F.	(Turkey) Galatasaray S.K.	€3.5m
13 July 2012	(Spain) Álvaro Mejía	(Turkey) Konyaspor	(Spain) UD Almería	Free
13 July 2012	(Argentina) Lucas Wilchez	(Chile) Colo-Colo	(Spain) Real Zaragoza	Loan
13 July 2012	(Spain) Ernesto Gómez	(Spain) CD Guadalajara	(Spain) Recreativo de Huelva	Free
13 July 2012	(Spain) Pablo Gil	(Spain) Real Madrid Castilla	(Czech Republic) AC Sparta Prague	Free
13 July 2012	(Spain) Manuel Ruz	(Spain) Gimnàstic de Tarragona	(Spain) Xerez CD	Free
13 July 2012	(Mexico) Ulises Dávila	(England) Chelsea F.C.	(Spain) CE Sabadell FC	Loan
13 July 2012	(Spain) Rubén Durán	(Spain) UD Logroñés	(Spain) CD Lugo	Free
13 July 2012	(Brazil) Sandro Silva	(Spain) Málaga CF	(Brazil) Cruzeiro Esporte Clube	Loan
13 July 2012	(Spain) Víctor Díaz	(Spain) Celta de Vigo B	(Spain) CD Lugo	Free
13 July 2012	(Argentina) Gustavo Cabral	(Argentina) Arsenal de Sarandí	(Spain) Celta de Vigo	Free
14 July 2012	(Spain) Juan Zamora	(Spain) CD Badajoz	(Spain) Recreativo de Huelva	Free
14 July 2012	(Spain) Alberto Rivera	(Spain) Sporting de Gijón	(Spain) Elche CF	Free
14 July 2012	(Spain) Asier Barahona	(Spain) CD Mirandés	(Spain) Deportivo Alavés	Loan
14 July 2012	(Spain) Nacho Novo	(Poland) Legia Warsaw	(Spain) SD Huesca	Free
14 July 2012	(Brazil) Evaldo Fabiano	(Portugal) Sporting CP	(Spain) Deportivo de La Coruña	Loan
14 July 2012	(Spain) Toño Ramírez	(Spain) Real Sociedad	(Spain) CD Guadalajara	Free
15 July 2012	(Morocco) Youssef El-Arabi	(Saudi Arabia) Al-Hilal FC	(Spain) Granada CF	€5m
15 July 2012	(Spain) Valdo	(Spain) Levante UD	(Mexico) Atlante F.C.	Free
15 July 2012	(Netherlands) Gianni Zuiverloon	(Spain) RCD Mallorca	(Netherlands) SC Heerenveen	Loan
15 July 2012	(Spain) Francisco Dorronsoro	(Spain) CD Alcoyano	(Spain) AD Alcorcón	Free
15 July 2012	(Spain) Manu Fernández	(Spain) Recreativo de Huelva	(Spain) AD Alcorcón	Free
16 July 2012	(Spain) Abraham Paz	(Spain) FC Cartagena	(Spain) CE Sabadell FC	Free
16 July 2012	(Spain) Jesús Cabrero	(Spain) SD Huesca	(Spain) Recreativo de Huelva	Free
16 July 2012	(Netherlands) Glenn Loovens	(Scotland) Celtic F.C.	(Spain) Real Zaragoza	Free
16 July 2012	(Spain) Fran Sol	(Spain) Real Madrid C	(Spain) CD Lugo	Loan
16 July 2012	(Spain) Sergio Prendes	(Spain) CD Alcoyano	(Spain) AD Alcorcón	Free
16 July 2012	(Spain) Víctor Merchán	(Spain) Real Madrid Castilla	(Spain) RCD Espanyol B	Free
17 July 2012	(Brazil) Nilmar	(Spain) Villarreal CF	(Qatar) Al Rayyan SC	€8m
17 July 2012	(Argentina) Mauro Quiroga	(Uruguay) Gimnasia y Esgrima de Concepción	(Spain) CD Lugo	Free
17 July 2012	(Argentina) Diego Tonetto	(Argentina) Ferro Carril Oeste	(Spain) CD Lugo	Free
17 July 2012	(Spain) Álex Pérez	(Spain) Getafe CF B	(Spain) SD Huesca	Loan
17 July 2012	(Spain) Álvaro Rey	(Spain) Gimnàstic de Tarragona	(Spain) Xerez CD	Free
17 July 2012	(Spain) Gonzalo Poley	(Spain) Atlético Malagueño	(Spain) Xerez CD	Free
17 July 2012	(Spain) Iban Zubiaurre	(Spain) Athletic Bilbao	(Spain) UD Salamanca	Loan
17 July 2012	(Mexico) Carlos Vela	(England) Arsenal F.C.	(Spain) Real Sociedad	Free
17 July 2012	(Spain) Jordi Amat	(Spain) RCD Espanyol	(Spain) Rayo Vallecano	Loan
17 July 2012	(Venezuela) Darwin Machís	(Italy) Udinese Calcio	(Spain) Granada CF	Loan
17 July 2012	(Spain) Pedro Sánchez	(Spain) Real Murcia	(Spain) Córdoba CF	Free
18 July 2012	(Spain) Álex Gálvez	(Spain) Sporting de Gijón	(Spain) Rayo Vallecano	Free
18 July 2012	(Spain) Albert Canal	(Spain) RCD Espanyol	(Spain) UE Llagostera	Free
18 July 2012	(Spain) Jonan García	(Spain) CD Guadalajara	(Spain) Deportivo Alavés	Free
18 July 2012	(Spain) Pablo Álvarez	(Spain) Deportivo de La Coruña	(Spain) CD Lugo	Free
18 July 2012	(Spain) Rubén Martínez	(Spain) Málaga CF	(Spain) Rayo Vallecano	Loan
18 July 2012	(Spain) Fran Piera	(Spain) CE Sabadell FC	(Spain) CD Alcoyano	Free
18 July 2012	(Spain) Kike López	(Spain) CD Tenerife	(Spain) AD Alcorcón	Free
18 July 2012	(Spain) Yoel Rodríguez	(Spain) Celta de Vigo	(Spain) CD Lugo	Loan
18 July 2012	(Guinea-Bissau) Edgar Ié	(Portugal) Sporting CP	(Spain) FC Barcelona B	Free
18 July 2012	(Guinea-Bissau) Agostinho Cá	(Portugal) Sporting CP	(Spain) FC Barcelona B	Free
18 July 2012	(Brazil) Fabinho	(Portugal) Rio Ave F.C.	(Spain) Real Madrid Castilla	Loan
18 July 2012	(Senegal) Pape Diop	(Spain) Racing de Santander	(Spain) Levante UD	€0.2m
19 July 2012	(Spain) Víctor Fernández	(Spain) CD Guadalajara	(Spain) UD Logroñés	Free
19 July 2012	(Spain) Adrián Murcia	(Spain) CD Mirandés	(Spain) UD Salamanca	Free
19 July 2012	(Spain) Carlos Martínez	(Spain) AD Alcorcón	(Spain) CD Leganés	Free
19 July 2012	(Argentina) Fernando Gago	(Spain) Real Madrid C.F.	(Spain) Valencia CF	€5m
19 July 2012	(Spain) Abel Gómez	(Spain) Granada CF	(Spain) Córdoba CF	Free
19 July 2012	(Israel) Ben Sahar	(Spain) RCD Espanyol	(Germany) Hertha BSC	Free
20 July 2012	(Spain) Óscar Vega	(Spain) CA Osasuna	(Spain) CD Leganés	Free
20 July 2012	(Spain) Héctor Font	(Spain) Recreativo de Huelva	(Spain) CD Lugo	Free
20 July 2012	(Spain) Bakari	(Spain) RCD Espanyol	(Spain) CE L'Hospitalet	Free
20 July 2012	(Spain) Dani Bautista	(Spain) UD Almería	(Spain) Racing de Santander	Free
20 July 2012	(Spain) David Rochela	(Spain) Deportivo de La Coruña	(Spain) Racing de Santander	Loan
20 July 2012	(Brazil) Michel Macedo	(Spain) UD Almería	(Brazil) Clube Atlético Mineiro	Loan
20 July 2012	(Serbia) Antonio Rukavina	(Germany) TSV 1860 München	(Spain) Real Valladolid	Free
20 July 2012	(Spain) Juan Calahorro	(Spain) Real Betis	(Spain) AD Alcorcón	Free
20 July 2012	(Paraguay) Claudio Morel	(Spain) Deportivo de La Coruña	(Argentina) Club Atlético Independiente	Free
20 July 2012	(Spain) Dani Tortolero	(Spain) Girona FC	(Spain) CE Sabadell FC	Free
20 July 2012	(Morocco) Moha	(Spain) Girona FC	(Spain) CE Sabadell FC	Free
20 July 2012	(Spain) Raúl Fuster	(Spain) Gimnàstic de Tarragona	(Spain) CD Lugo	Free
20 July 2012	(Spain) Michu	(Spain) Rayo Vallecano	(Wales) Swansea City A.F.C.	€2m
21 July 2012	(Spain) Víctor Andrés	(Spain) CD Numancia	(Spain) UD Salamanca	Loan
21 July 2012	(Spain) Ion Erice	(Greece) Kerkyra	(Spain) CD Guadalajara	Free
23 July 2012	(Spain) Ander Lambarri	(Spain) CD Mirandés	(Spain) Real Unión	Free
23 July 2012	(Norway) Vadim Demidov	(Spain) Real Sociedad	(Germany) Eintracht Frankfurt	Free
23 July 2012	(Spain) Pablo Sánchez	(Spain) Recreativo de Huelva	(Spain) Cádiz CF	Free
23 July 2012	(Nigeria) Kalu Uche	(Spain) RCD Espanyol	(Turkey) Kasımpaşa Spor Kulübü	€1.5m
23 July 2012	(Spain) Juan Villar	(Spain) Recreativo de Huelva	(Spain) Cádiz CF	Free
23 July 2012	(Spain) Pedro Mosquera	(Spain) Getafe CF	(Spain) Real Madrid Castilla	Loan
23 July 2012	(Spain) Toni Moral	(Spain) FC Cartagena	(Spain) Girona FC	Free
23 July 2012	(Uruguay) Adrián Gunino	(Uruguay) Centro Atlético Fénix	(Spain) UD Almería	Loan
23 July 2012	(Argentina) Juan Neira	(Argentina) Club Atlético Lanús	(Spain) Real Valladolid	Loan
24 July 2012	(Italy) Tiberio Guarente	(Spain) Sevilla FC	(Italy) Bologna F.C. 1909	Loan
24 July 2012	(Spain) Rubén Párraga	(Spain) Real Murcia	(Spain) SD Huesca	Free
24 July 2012	(Spain) Liru	(Spain) Xerez CD	(Spain) UD Almería B	Free
24 July 2012	(Argentina) Diego Herner	(Spain) UD Las Palmas	(Colombia) Independiente Medellín	Free
24 July 2012	(France) Geoffrey Kondogbia	(France) RC Lens	(Spain) Sevilla FC	€4m
24 July 2012	(Spain) David Prieto	(Spain) Córdoba CF	(Spain) Xerez CD	Free
24 July 2012	(Spain) Javier Casquero	(Spain) Getafe CF	(Spain) UD Almería	Free
24 July 2012	(Uruguay) Sebastián Eguren	(Spain) Sporting de Gijón	(Paraguay) Club Libertad	Free
24 July 2012	(Spain) Álex Ortiz	(Spain) Gimnàstic de Tarragona	(Spain) CD Guadalajara	Free
24 July 2012	(Spain) Javi Hernández	(Spain) AD Alcorcón	(Spain) Deportivo Alavés	Free
24 July 2012	(Uruguay) Damián Suárez	(Spain) Sporting de Gijón	(Spain) Elche CF	Free
24 July 2012	(Argentina) Sergio Araujo	(Argentina) Boca Juniors	(Spain) FC Barcelona B	Loan
25 July 2012	(Spain) Ezequiel Calvente	(Spain) Real Betis	(Germany) SC Freiburg	Loan
25 July 2012	(Portugal) Tiago Gomes	(Spain) Hércules CF	(England) Blackpool F.C.	Free
25 July 2012	(Spain) Juan Aguilera	(Spain) Real Murcia	(Spain) Real Oviedo	Free
25 July 2012	(Colombia) Jeison Murillo	(Spain) Granada CF	(Spain) UD Las Palmas	Loan
25 July 2012	(Nigeria) Macauley Chrisantus	(Germany) Hamburger SV	(Spain) UD Las Palmas	Free
25 July 2012	(Argentina) Oscar Ustari	(Spain) Getafe CF	(Argentina) Boca Juniors	Free
25 July 2012	(Iran) Javad Nekounam	(Spain) CA Osasuna	(Iran) Esteghlal F.C.	€2m
25 July 2012	(France) Julien Escudé	(Spain) Sevilla FC	(Turkey) Beşiktaş J.K.	€1m
25 July 2012	(Spain) Pablo Orbaiz	(Spain) Athletic Bilbao	(Russia) FC Rubin Kazan	Free
25 July 2012	(Spain) Álex Bernal	(Spain) Real Betis	(Spain) Granada CF	Free
25 July 2012	(Spain) Diego Rivas	(Spain) CD Lugo	(Spain) Elche CF	Free
25 July 2012	(Spain) Iván González	(Spain) Málaga CF	(Spain) Real Madrid Castilla	Free
25 July 2012	(Colombia) Abel Aguilar	(Spain) Hércules CF	(Spain) Deportivo de La Coruña	Loan
26 July 2012	(Spain) Urko Vera	(Spain) Hércules CF	(Spain) SD Ponferradina	Free
26 July 2012	(Portugal) Hélder Rosário	(Spain) Málaga CF	(Spain) SD Ponferradina	Free
26 July 2012	(Ivory Coast) Romaric	(Spain) Sevilla FC	(Spain) Real Zaragoza	Free
26 July 2012	(Greece) Nikolaos Karabelas	(Greece) AEK Athens F.C.	(Spain) Levante UD	Free
26 July 2012	(Spain) Javi Soria	(Spain) CD Guadalajara	(Spain) CD Mirandés	Free
27 July 2012	(Spain) Félix Quero	(Spain) CD Lugo	(Spain) UD Logroñés	Free
27 July 2012	(Spain) David Català	(Spain) Celta de Vigo	(Cyprus) AEK Larnaca F.C.	Free
27 July 2012	(Spain) Álvaro Antón	(Spain) FC Cartagena	(Spain) CD Guadalajara	Free
27 July 2012	(Spain) Joan Capdevila	(Portugal) S.L. Benfica	(Spain) RCD Espanyol	Free
27 July 2012	(Spain) Óscar Díaz	(Spain) Girona FC	(Spain) CD Lugo	Free
27 July 2012	(Germany) Patrick Ebert	(Germany) Hertha BSC	(Spain) Real Valladolid	Free
27 July 2012	(Spain) Jofre Mateu	(Spain) Real Valladolid	(Spain) Girona FC	Free
28 July 2012	(Argentina) Hernán Bernardello	(Spain) UD Almería	(Argentina) Club Atlético Colón	Loan
28 July 2012	(Portugal) Rúben Micael	(Spain) Atlético Madrid	(Portugal) S.C. Braga	Loan
28 July 2012	(Spain) Lluís Sastre	(Spain) SD Huesca	(Spain) Real Valladolid	Free
29 July 2012	(Scotland) Ikechi Anya	(Spain) Granada CF	(England) Watford F.C.	Loan
29 July 2012	(Spain) Javi Álamo	(Spain) Recreativo de Huelva	(Spain) Real Zaragoza	€0.5m
29 July 2012	(Spain) David Ferreiro	(Spain) Granada CF	(Spain) Racing de Santander	Loan
30 July 2012	(Brazil) Cicinho	(Brazil) Sociedade Esportiva Palmeiras	(Spain) Sevilla FC	€2m
30 July 2012	(Spain) Javier Matilla	(Spain) Real Betis	(Spain) Real Murcia	Loan
31 July 2012	(Spain) Diego Garrido	(Spain) CD Lugo	(Spain) Cádiz CF	Free
31 July 2012	(France) Samuel Camille	(Spain) Cádiz CF	(Spain) AD Alcorcón	Free
31 July 2012	(Czechoslovakia) Daniel Pudil	(Spain) Granada CF	(England) Watford F.C.	Loan
31 July 2012	(Spain) Borja García	(Spain) Córdoba CF	(Spain) Real Madrid Castilla	€1.5m
31 July 2012	(Spain) Airam López	(Spain) Córdoba CF	(Spain) CD Numancia	Free
31 July 2012	(Scotland) Ryan Harper	(Spain) CD Guadalajara	(Spain) CF Fuenlabrada	Free
31 July 2012	(Portugal) Roderick Miranda	(Portugal) S.L. Benfica	(Spain) Deportivo de La Coruña	Loan
31 July 2012	(Portugal) Nélson Oliveira	(Portugal) S.L. Benfica	(Spain) Deportivo de La Coruña	Loan
1 August 2012	(Spain) Juande Prados	(Belgium) K.V.C. Westerlo	(Spain) SD Ponferradina	Free
1 August 2012	(Spain) Xavi Torres	(Spain) Málaga CF	(Spain) Levante UD	€0.3m
1 August 2012	(Spain) Xavi Torres	(Spain) Levante UD	(Spain) Getafe CF	€0.5m
1 August 2012	(Spain) Joseba Llorente	(Spain) Real Sociedad	(Spain) CA Osasuna	Loan
1 August 2012	(Spain) Lucas Porcar	(Spain) Villarreal CF B	(Spain) Real Zaragoza	Free
1 August 2012	(Spain) Borja Valero	(Spain) Villarreal CF	(Italy) ACF Fiorentina	€7m
1 August 2012	(Spain) David de Coz	(Spain) Granada CF	(Spain) CD Lugo	Loan
1 August 2012	(Belgium) Ritchie Kitoko	(Italy) Udinese Calcio	(Spain) Girona FC	Loan
2 August 2012	(Argentina) Eduardo Salvio	(Spain) Atlético Madrid	(Portugal) S.L. Benfica	€10m
2 August 2012	(Spain) Dani Aquino	(Spain) Real Valladolid	(Spain) Real Oviedo	Free
2 August 2012	(Spain) Iván Ramis	(Spain) RCD Mallorca	(England) Wigan Athletic F.C.	€6m
2 August 2012	(Spain) Javier Portillo	(Spain) UD Las Palmas	(Spain) Hércules CF	Free
2 August 2012	(Spain) Fran Mérida	(Spain) Atlético Madrid	(Spain) Hércules CF	Free
3 August 2012	(Uruguay) Leandro Cabrera	(Spain) Atlético Madrid	(Spain) Hércules CF	Loan
3 August 2012	(Argentina) Gonzalo Rodríguez	(Spain) Villarreal CF	(Italy) ACF Fiorentina	€1m
3 August 2012	(Spain) Apoño	(Spain) Málaga CF	(Spain) Real Zaragoza	€0.5m
3 August 2012	(Spain) José Ángel Valdés	(Italy) A.S. Roma	(Spain) Real Sociedad	Loan
3 August 2012	(Spain) Kiko Olivas	(Spain) Villarreal CF B	(Spain) Córdoba CF	Free
3 August 2012	(Spain) Gorka Eraña	(Spain) Bilbao Athletic	(Spain) Barakaldo CF	Loan
4 August 2012	(Spain) Oriol Rosell	(Spain) FC Barcelona B	(United States) Sporting Kansas City	Free
4 August 2012	(Spain) Carlitos López	(Spain) Elche CF	(Russia) FC Petrotrest Saint Petersburg	Loan
4 August 2012	(Spain) Dani Nieto	(Spain) RCD Espanyol	(Spain) AD Alcorcón	Free
4 August 2012	(Spain) Miquel Robusté	(Spain) Xerez CD	(Spain) SD Ponferradina	Free
5 August 2012	(Venezuela) José Rondón	(Spain) Málaga CF	(Russia) FC Rubin Kazan	€10m
5 August 2012	(Spain) Roberto García	(Spain) SD Huesca	(Cyprus) Apollon Limassol	Free
5 August 2012	(Spain) Iván Amaya	(Spain) Real Murcia	(Cyprus) Apollon Limassol	Free
5 August 2012	(Spain) David Fernández	(Spain) CD Guadalajara	(Spain) Real Oviedo	Free
6 August 2012	(Spain) Luis Alberto Romero	(Spain) Sevilla FC	(Spain) FC Barcelona B	Loan
6 August 2012	(Spain) Álex Bernal	(Spain) Granada CF	(Spain) CD Mirandés	Loan
6 August 2012	(Spain) Carlos Marchena	(Spain) Villarreal CF	(Spain) Deportivo de La Coruña	Free
6 August 2012	(Spain) Borja Sánchez	(Spain) SD Ponferradina	(Spain) UD Salamanca	Free
6 August 2012	(Spain) Sergio Juste	(Spain) Gimnàstic de Tarragona	(Spain) FC Barcelona B	Free
7 August 2012	(Argentina) Mathias Saavedra	(Uruguay) Huracán Football Club	(Spain) Recreativo de Huelva	Free
7 August 2012	(Argentina) Mathias Saavedra	(Spain) Recreativo de Huelva	(Spain) CD San Roque de Lepe	Loan
7 August 2012	(Spain) Santi Cazorla	(Spain) Málaga CF	(England) Arsenal F.C.	€19m
7 August 2012	(Spain) Jorge Larrosa	(Spain) SD Huesca	(Spain) UD Barbastro	Free
7 August 2012	(Spain) Gonzalo Colsa	(Spain) Racing de Santander	(Spain) CD Mirandés	Free
7 August 2012	(Spain) Carles Gil	(Spain) Valencia CF Mestalla	(Spain) Elche CF	Loan
7 August 2012	(Spain) Pau Cendrós	(Spain) RCD Mallorca	(Belgium) K.A.A. Gent	Free
8 August 2012	(Spain) Joselu Sanmartín	(Spain) Real Madrid Castilla	(Germany) TSG 1899 Hoffenheim	€6m
8 August 2012	(Colombia) Cristián Zapata	(Spain) Villarreal CF	(Italy) A.C. Milan	Loan
8 August 2012	(Sweden) Olof Mellberg	(Greece) Olympiacos F.C.	(Spain) Villarreal CF	Free
8 August 2012	(Argentina) Augusto Fernández	(Argentina) Club Atlético Vélez Sársfield	(Spain) Celta de Vigo	€1.5m
8 August 2012	(Argentina) Nicolás Martínez	(Argentina) Club Atlético Independiente	(Spain) Real Murcia	Free
8 August 2012	(Argentina) Mauro dos Santos	(Argentina) Club Atlético Banfield	(Spain) Real Murcia	Free
9 August 2012	(Spain) Sergio Canales	(Spain) Real Madrid C.F.	(Spain) Valencia CF	€5m
9 August 2012	(Spain) Braulio Nóbrega	(Spain) FC Cartagena	(Spain) Hércules CF	Free
9 August 2012	(Spain) Omar Ramos	(Spain) SD Huesca	(Spain) Real Valladolid	Loan
9 August 2012	(Denmark) Michael Jakobsen	(Spain) UD Almería	(Denmark) F.C. Copenhagen	Free
9 August 2012	(Argentina) Fernando Cavenaghi	(Argentina) Club Atlético River Plate	(Spain) Villarreal CF	Free
9 August 2012	(Spain) Luismi Gracia	(Spain) CD Lugo	(Spain) Deportivo Alavés	Free
10 August 2012	(Spain) Dani Jiménez	(Spain) Sevilla Atlético	(Spain) CD Mirandés	Free
10 August 2012	(Argentina) Lautaro Acosta	(Spain) Sevilla FC	(Argentina) Boca Juniors	Free
10 August 2012	(Netherlands) Joris Mathijsen	(Spain) Málaga CF	(Netherlands) Feyenoord	Free
10 August 2012	(Paraguay) Javier Acuña	(Spain) Real Madrid Castilla	(Spain) Girona FC	Free
10 August 2012	(Peru) Santiago Acasiete	(Spain) UD Almería	(Peru) Cienciano	Free
11 August 2012	(Spain) Alberto Botía	(Spain) Sporting de Gijón	(Spain) Sevilla FC	€2.5m
11 August 2012	(Spain) Carlos Lázaro	(Spain) Real Valladolid	(Spain) SD Huesca	Loan
11 August 2012	(Germany) Christian Lell	(Germany) Hertha BSC	(Spain) Levante UD	Free
12 August 2012	(Spain) Javier Camuñas	(Spain) Villarreal CF	(Spain) Deportivo de La Coruña	Loan
12 August 2012	(Spain) Álvaro Vega	(Spain) Recreativo de Huelva	(Spain) CD San Roque de Lepe	Loan
12 August 2012	(Spain) Rubén Anuarbe	(Spain) AD Alcorcón	(Spain) CF Fuenlabrada	Free
12 August 2012	(Spain) José Juan Figueras	(Spain) Granada CF	(Spain) CD Lugo	Free
12 August 2012	(Spain) Manuel Pavón	(Spain) CD Numancia	(Spain) CD Lugo	Free
12 August 2012	(Bolivia) Samuel Galindo	(England) Arsenal F.C.	(Spain) CD Lugo	Loan
13 August 2012	(Spain) José María Cases	(Spain) Granada CF	(Spain) CD Mirandés	Loan
14 August 2012	(Greece) Theofanis Gekas	(Turkey) Samsunspor	(Spain) Levante UD	Free
14 August 2012	(Spain) Toni Sánchez	(Spain) SD Huesca	(Spain) CP Cacereño	Free
14 August 2012	(Spain) José Catalá	(Spain) Villarreal CF	(Spain) Real Murcia	Free
14 August 2012	(Ivory Coast) Arouna Koné	(Spain) Levante UD	(England) Wigan Athletic F.C.	€5m
14 August 2012	(Paraguay) Nelson Haedo Valdez	(Russia) FC Rubin Kazan	(Spain) Valencia CF	Loan
14 August 2012	(Spain) Felipe Sanchón	(Spain) Hércules CF	(Spain) Girona FC	Free
15 August 2012	(Argentina) Alejandro Domínguez	(Spain) Valencia CF	(Spain) Rayo Vallecano	Free
15 August 2012	(Spain) Aarón Bueno	(Spain) CE Sabadell FC	(Spain) Gimnàstic de Tarragona	Free
16 August 2012	(Brazil) Wellington Silva	(England) Arsenal F.C.	(Spain) SD Ponferradina	Loan
16 August 2012	(Spain) Saúl Berjón	(Spain) FC Barcelona B	(Spain) Real Murcia	Free
16 August 2012	(Spain) Borja Valle	(Spain) SD Ponferradina	(Spain) CD Ourense	Loan
16 August 2012	(Spain) Jaime Astrain	(Spain) Córdoba CF	(Spain) Écija Balompié	Loan
16 August 2012	(Argentina) Sebastián Dubarbier	(France) FC Lorient	(Spain) Córdoba CF	Free
16 August 2012	(Spain) Pere Martínez	(Spain) Villarreal CF B	(Spain) Hércules CF	Free
16 August 2012	(Portugal) Afonso Taira	(Spain) Córdoba CF	Atlético Clube de Portugal	Loan
16 August 2012	(Uruguay) Adrián Luna	(Spain) RCD Espanyol	(Uruguay) Club Nacional de Football	Loan
16 August 2012	(Spain) Iago Bouzón	(Cyprus) AC Omonia	(Spain) Xerez CD	Free
16 August 2012	(Sweden) Henok Goitom	(Spain) UD Almería	(Sweden) AIK Fotboll	Free
16 August 2012	(Spain) Ferran Corominas	(Spain) Girona FC	(Spain) Elche CF	€0.1m
16 August 2012	(Spain) José Mari Martín	(Spain) Real Jaén	(Spain) Real Zaragoza	Free
17 August 2012	(Poland) Dariusz Dudka	(France) AJ Auxerre	(Spain) Levante UD	Free
17 August 2012	(Argentina) Javier Malagueño	(Spain) Málaga CF	(Argentina) Club Atlético Tigre	Free
17 August 2012	(Portugal) Simão Sabrosa	(Turkey) Beşiktaş J.K.	(Spain) RCD Espanyol	Free
17 August 2012	(Spain) Luis Domenech	(Spain) SD Ponferradina	(Spain) UD Melilla	Free
18 August 2012	(Cameroon) Alex Song	(England) Arsenal F.C.	(Spain) FC Barcelona	€19m
18 August 2012	(Spain) Iván González	(Spain) CD Lugo	(Spain) CD Ourense	Free
18 August 2012	(Equatorial Guinea) Iván Zarandona	(Spain) CD Lugo	(Spain) SD Noja	Free
18 August 2012	(Spain) Fernando Morán	(Spain) Gimnàstic de Tarragona	(Spain) AD Alcorcón	Free
19 August 2012	(Spain) José Oya	(Spain) CD Guadalajara	(Spain) UCAM Murcia CF	Free
19 August 2012	(Spain) Rafael Martínez	(Spain) Granada CF	(Spain) Villarrubia CF	Free
19 August 2012	(Spain) Kike Mateo	(Spain) Elche CF	(Spain) UCAM Murcia CF	Free
20 August 2012	(Spain) Rodri Ríos	(Spain) FC Barcelona B	(England) Sheffield Wednesday F.C.	Loan
20 August 2012	(Spain) Raúl Albentosa	(Spain) Recreativo de Huelva	(Spain) Cádiz CF	Free
20 August 2012	(Argentina) Héctor Canteros	(Argentina) Club Atlético Vélez Sársfield	(Spain) Villarreal CF	Loan
20 August 2012	(Spain) Borja Pérez	(Spain) AD Alcorcón	(Scotland) Kilmarnock F.C.	Free
20 August 2012	(Spain) Rúper	(Spain) CA Osasuna	(Spain) CD Mirandés	Loan
21 August 2012	(Brazil) Anderson Conceição	(Brazil) Figueirense Futebol Clube	(Spain) RCD Mallorca	Loan
21 August 2012	(Spain) Rubén García	(Spain) CD Lugo	(Spain) UD Logroñés	Free
21 August 2012	(Spain) Sergio Ayala	(Spain) FC Barcelona B	(Spain) Deportivo Alavés	Loan
21 August 2012	(Spain) José Luis Capdevila	(Spain) Xerez CD	(Spain) Huracán Valencia CF	Free
21 August 2012	(Spain) Francis Durán	(Spain) Elche CF	(Spain) Orihuela CF	Free
21 August 2012	(Spain) Urzáiz	(Spain) Real Murcia	(Spain) FC Cartagena	Free
21 August 2012	(Denmark) Michael Krohn-Dehli	(Denmark) Brøndby IF	(Spain) Celta de Vigo	€1m
22 August 2012	(Nigeria) Nosa Igiebor	(Israel) Hapoel Tel Aviv F.C.	(Spain) Real Betis	Free
22 August 2012	(Nigeria) Kabiru Akinsola	(Spain) Granada CF	(Spain) Racing de Santander	Loan
22 August 2012	(Spain) Óscar Pérez	(Spain) Granada CF	(Spain) Racing de Santander	Loan
22 August 2012	(Senegal) Pape Maly Diamanka	(Spain) Rayo Vallecano	(Norway) Vålerenga Fotball	Loan
22 August 2012	(Spain) Ruymán Hernández	(Spain) UD Las Palmas	(Spain) Racing de Santander	Free
22 August 2012	(Colombia) John Edison Mosquera	(Spain) Hércules CF	(Spain) CD Alcoyano	Loan
22 August 2012	(Japan) Hiroshi Ibusuki	(Spain) Sevilla FC	(Belgium) K.A.S. Eupen	Loan
22 August 2012	(Brazil) Pedro Geromel	(Germany) 1. FC Köln	(Spain) RCD Mallorca	Loan
23 August 2012	(Spain) Pablo Pallarès	(Spain) UD Almería	(Spain) San Fernando CD	Free
23 August 2012	(Ghana) Anthony Annan	(Germany) FC Schalke 04	(Spain) CA Osasuna	Loan
23 August 2012	(France) Aly Cissokho	(France) Olympique Lyonnais	(Spain) Valencia CF	€7m
24 August 2012	(Spain) Adri Ruiz	(Spain) Atlético Malagueño	(Spain) Xerez CD	Free
24 August 2012	(Senegal) Ibrahima Baldé	(Spain) CA Osasuna	(Russia) FC Kuban Krasnodar	€4m
25 August 2012	(Portugal) Henrique Sereno	(Portugal) F.C. Porto	(Spain) Real Valladolid	Loan
25 August 2012	(Turkey) Nuri Şahin	(Spain) Real Madrid C.F.	(England) Liverpool F.C.	Loan
25 August 2012	(Chile) Matías Campos	(Spain) Granada CF	(Italy) A.C. Siena	Loan
26 August 2012	(Spain) Diego Bermúdez	(Spain) AD Alcorcón	(Spain) Cádiz CF	Free
27 August 2012	(Croatia) Luka Modrić	(England) Tottenham Hotspur F.C.	(Spain) Real Madrid C.F.	€30m
27 August 2012	(Serbia) Stefan Babović	(Serbia) FK Partizan	(Spain) Real Zaragoza	Free
27 August 2012	(Spain) Marc Torrejón	(Spain) Racing de Santander	(Germany) 1. FC Kaiserslautern	Free
27 August 2012	(Uruguay) Walter Pandiani	(Spain) RCD Espanyol	(Spain) Villarreal CF	Free
27 August 2012	(Portugal) Hugo Vieira	(Portugal) S.L. Benfica	(Spain) Sporting de Gijón	Loan
27 August 2012	(Spain) Miguel Ángel Cordero	(Spain) Xerez CD	(Greece) AEK Athens F.C.	Free
27 August 2012	(Spain) Xavi Annunziata	(Spain) CA Osasuna	(Spain) SD Huesca	Loan
27 August 2012	(Argentina) Franco Vázquez	(Italy) U.S. Città di Palermo	(Spain) Rayo Vallecano	Loan
27 August 2012	(Serbia) Stefan Deák	(Spain) Deportivo de La Coruña	(Hungary) Siófok KC	Loan
27 August 2012	(Spain) Domingo Cisma	(Spain) Racing de Santander	(Spain) Atlético Madrid	Free
28 August 2012	(Spain) Ian Mackay	(Spain) CE Sabadell FC	(Spain) CD Atlético Baleares	Free
28 August 2012	(Italy) Samuele Longo	(Italy) Inter Milan	(Spain) RCD Espanyol	Loan
28 August 2012	(Spain) Mikel Orbegozo	(Spain) Athletic Bilbao	(Spain) Sestao River Club	Loan
28 August 2012	(Spain) Raúl Bravo	(Spain) Rayo Vallecano	(Belgium) Beerschot AC	Free
28 August 2012	(Poland) Damien Perquis	(France) FC Sochaux-Montbéliard	(Spain) Real Betis	€1m
29 August 2012	(Spain) David Rodríguez	(Spain) Celta de Vigo	(Spain) Sporting de Gijón	Free
29 August 2012	(Spain) Marco Navas	(Spain) CD Leganés	(Spain) Recreativo de Huelva	Free
29 August 2012	(Spain) Javi Martínez	(Spain) Athletic Bilbao	(Germany) FC Bayern Munich	€40m
29 August 2012	(Uruguay) Christian Stuani	(Italy) Reggina Calcio	(Spain) RCD Espanyol	Free
29 August 2012	(Ghana) Mohammed Abu	(England) Manchester City F.C.	(Spain) Rayo Vallecano	Loan
29 August 2012	(Spain) Lucas Porcar	(Spain) Real Zaragoza	(Spain) Xerez CD	Loan
29 August 2012	(Spain) Borja González	(Spain) Atlético Madrid	(Spain) SD Huesca	Loan
30 August 2012	(Algeria) Yacine Brahimi	(France) Stade Rennais F.C.	(Spain) Granada CF	Loan
30 August 2012	(Spain) Baltasar Rigo	(Spain) Girona FC	(Spain) CD Numancia	Free
30 August 2012	(Spain) Esteban Granero	(Spain) Real Madrid C.F.	(England) Queens Park Rangers F.C.	€8m
30 August 2012	(Spain) Pablo Hernández	(Spain) Valencia CF	(Wales) Swansea City A.F.C.	€7m
30 August 2012	(Spain) Ángel López	(Spain) Villarreal CF	(Spain) Real Betis	Free
30 August 2012	(Argentina) Javier Saviola	(Portugal) S.L. Benfica	(Spain) Málaga CF	Loan
30 August 2012	(Italy) Enzo Maresca	(Spain) Málaga CF	(Italy) U.C. Sampdoria	Free
30 August 2012	(Mali) Sidi Yaya Keita	(France) RC Lens	(Spain) Xerez CD	Free
30 August 2012	(Netherlands) Jeffrey Sarpong	(Spain) Real Sociedad	(Spain) Hércules CF	Loan
30 August 2012	(Argentina) Nicolás Tagliafico	(Argentina) Club Atlético Banfield	(Spain) Real Murcia	Loan
30 August 2012	(Spain) José Ignacio Peleteiro	(Spain) Celta de Vigo	(Spain) Real Madrid Castilla	Loan
30 August 2012	(France) Vincenzo Rennella	(Italy) Genoa C.F.C.	(Spain) Córdoba CF	Loan
30 August 2012	(Chile) Manuel Iturra	(Spain) Real Murcia	(Spain) Málaga CF	Free
31 August 2012	(Spain) Samuel Baños	(Spain) CE Sabadell FC	(Spain) CD Atlético Baleares	Free
31 August 2012	(Argentina) Jonathan Gómez	(Argentina) Club Atlético Banfield	(Spain) Real Murcia	Loan
31 August 2012	(Poland) Paweł Brożek	(Scotland) Celtic F.C.	(Spain) Recreativo de Huelva	Free
31 August 2012	(Spain) Sergio Rodríguez	(Russia) Spartak Moscow	(Spain) Rayo Vallecano	Free
31 August 2012	(Netherlands) Ibrahim Afellay	(Spain) FC Barcelona	(Germany) FC Schalke 04	Loan
31 August 2012	(Spain) Rafa García	(Spain) Rayo Vallecano	(Spain) Xerez CD	Loan
31 August 2012	(Spain) Galder Cerrajería	(Spain) Athletic Bilbao	(Spain) Real Oviedo	Free
31 August 2012	(Nigeria) Odion Ighalo	(Italy) Udinese Calcio	(Spain) Granada CF	Loan
31 August 2012	(South Korea) Park Chu-Young	(England) Arsenal F.C.	(Spain) Celta de Vigo	Loan
31 August 2012	(Spain) Manuel Arana	(Spain) Racing de Santander	(Spain) Rayo Vallecano	Free
31 August 2012	(Spain) Sergi Enrich	(Spain) RCD Mallorca	(Spain) AD Alcorcón	Loan
31 August 2012	(Mexico) Giovani dos Santos	(England) Tottenham Hotspur F.C.	(Spain) RCD Mallorca	€2.7m
31 August 2012	(Republic of the Congo) Thievy Bifouma	(Spain) RCD Espanyol	(Spain) UD Las Palmas	Loan
31 August 2012	(Ghana) Jacob Akrong	(Spain) Granada CF	(Spain) CD San Roque de Lepe	Loan
31 August 2012	(Colombia) Wilson Cuero	(Spain) Granada CF	(Spain) CD San Roque de Lepe	Loan
31 August 2012	(Italy) Massimo Volta	(Italy) U.C. Sampdoria	(Spain) Levante UD	Loan
31 August 2012	(Spain) Toti	(Spain) Granada CF	(Spain) Hércules CF	Loan
31 August 2012	(Spain) Álvaro Vázquez	(Spain) RCD Espanyol	(Spain) Getafe CF	Free
31 August 2012	(Spain) Víctor Mongil	(Spain) Real Valladolid	(Spain) Atlético Madrid B	Free
31 August 2012	(Spain) Francisco Alcácer	(Spain) Valencia CF	(Spain) Getafe CF	Loan
31 August 2012	(Spain) Adri Cuevas	(Spain) Xerez CD	(Spain) San Fernando CD	Loan
31 August 2012	(Spain) Gonzalo Poley	(Spain) Xerez CD	(Spain) Atlético Sanluqueño CF	Loan
31 August 2012	(Spain) Álvaro Arroyo	(Spain) Getafe CF	(Spain) AD Alcorcón	Loan
31 August 2012	(Paraguay) Roque Santa Cruz	(England) Manchester City F.C.	(Spain) Málaga CF	Loan
31 August 2012	(Spain) José Antonio Pardo	(Spain) Valencia CF Mestalla	(Spain) Recreativo de Huelva	Free
31 August 2012	(Spain) Sergio Díaz	(Spain) Málaga CF	(Spain) SD Huesca	Free
31 August 2012	(Spain) Carlos Calvo	(Italy) Udinese Calcio	(Spain) UD Almería	Free
31 August 2012	(Spain) Jorge Alonso	(Spain) Real Valladolid	(Spain) Racing de Santander	Free
31 August 2012	(Serbia) Andrija Kaluđerović	(China) Beijing Guoan F.C.	(Spain) Racing de Santander	Loan
31 August 2012	(United States) Carlos Bocanegra	(Scotland) Rangers F.C.	(Spain) Racing de Santander	Loan
31 August 2012	(Venezuela) Miku	(Spain) Getafe CF	(Scotland) Celtic F.C.	Loan
31 August 2012	(Spain) Txiki	(Spain) FC Cartagena	(Spain) Girona FC	Free
31 August 2012	(Spain) Víctor Laguardia	(Spain) Real Zaragoza	(Spain) AD Alcorcón	Loan
31 August 2012	(Spain) David López	(Spain) Athletic Bilbao	(England) Brighton & Hove Albion F.C.	Free
31 August 2012	(Spain) Edu Bedia	(Spain) Racing de Santander	(Spain) Hércules CF	Free
31 August 2012	(Ghana) Michael Essien	(England) Chelsea F.C.	(Spain) Real Madrid C.F.	Loan
31 August 2012	(United States) Oguchi Onyewu	(Portugal) Sporting CP	(Spain) Málaga CF	Free
31 August 2012	(France) Lassana Diarra	(Spain) Real Madrid C.F.	(Russia) FC Anzhi Makhachkala	€5m
31 August 2012	(Spain) Álex Cruz	(Spain) Granada CF	(Spain) UCAM Murcia CF	Loan
31 August 2012	(Romania) Cristian Săpunaru	(Portugal) F.C. Porto	(Spain) Real Zaragoza	Free
31 August 2012	(Spain) Juli	(Spain) Rayo Vallecano	(Spain) AD Alcorcón	Free
1 September 2012	(Spain) José Antonio Picón	(Spain) Racing de Santander	(Spain) CD Atlético Baleares	Free
1 September 2012	(Spain) Roque Mesa	(Spain) UD Las Palmas	(Spain) CD Atlético Baleares	Free
1 September 2012	(Spain) Joseba Arriaga	(Spain) CD Guadalajara	(Spain) Gimnàstic de Tarragona	Free
1 September 2012	(Tunisia) Lassad Nouioui	(Spain) Deportivo de La Coruña	(Scotland) Celtic F.C.	Free
3 September 2012	(Spain) Manuel Redondo	(Spain) CE Sabadell FC	(Spain) Xerez CD	Free
3 September 2012	(Spain) Marquitos García	(Spain) Real Valladolid	(Spain) Xerez CD	Free
4 September 2012	(Spain) José María Movilla	(Spain) Rayo Vallecano	(Spain) Real Zaragoza	Free
6 September 2012	(France) Hameur Bouazza	(England) Millwall F.C.	(Spain) Racing de Santander	Free
9 September 2012	(Spain) David Aganzo	(Spain) Hércules CF	(Greece) Aris	Free
14 September 2012	(Nigeria) Obafemi Martins	(Russia) FC Rubin Kazan	(Spain) Levante UD	Free
24 September 2012	(Spain) Isaac Jové	(Spain) Real Murcia	(Greece) Iraklis	Free
26 September 2012	(Spain) Raúl Navas	(Spain) Córdoba CF	(Spain) Xerez CD	Free
27 September 2012	(Uruguay) Carlos Diogo	(Bulgaria) CSKA Sofia	(Spain) SD Huesca	Free
7 October 2012	(Spain) David Malo	(Spain) SD Ponferradina	(Spain) Palamós CF	Free
8 October 2012	(Nigeria) Kabiru Akinsola	(Spain) Granada CF	(Spain) FC Cartagena	Loan
15 October 2012	(Spain) Andreu Fontàs	(Spain) FC Barcelona	(Spain) RCD Mallorca	Loan

== See also ==
- List of Spanish football transfers winter 2012–13
