= List of Spanish football transfers winter 2012–13 =

This is a list of Spanish football transfers for the January sale in the 2012–13 season of La Liga and Segunda División. Only moves from La Liga and Segunda División are listed.

The winter transfer window opened on 1 January 2013, although a few transfers took place prior to that date. The window will close at midnight on 1 February 2013. Players without a club can join one at any time, either during or in between transfer windows. Clubs below La Liga level can also sign players on loan at any time. If need be, clubs can sign a goalkeeper on an emergency loan, if all others are unavailable.

== Winter 2012–13 transfer window ==
Date	Name	Moving from	Moving to	Fee
4 November 2012	(Spain) Antonio Tomás	Free agent	(Spain) CD Numancia	Free
5 November 2012	(Spain) Iago Beceiro	(Spain) Deportivo de La Coruña	(Ukraine) FC Karpaty Lviv	Free
6 November 2012	(Spain) Daniel Güiza	(Spain) Getafe CF	(Malaysia) Johor FC	Loan
6 November 2012	(Sweden) Daniel Larsson	(Sweden) Malmö FF	(Spain) Real Valladolid	Free
11 November 2012	(Cameroon) Timothée Atouba	Free agent	(Spain) UD Las Palmas	Free
5 December 2012	(Ghana) Brimah Razak	Free agent	(Spain) CD Guadalajara	Free
5 December 2012	(Spain) Mario Rosas	Free agent	(Spain) Hércules CF	Free
5 December 2012	(Spain) Pablo Redondo	Free agent	(Spain) Hércules CF	Free
10 December 2012	(Spain) Jonathan Pereira	(Spain) Real Betis	(Spain) Villarreal CF	Loan
12 December 2012	(Spain) Iván Pérez	Free agent	(Spain) CD Lugo	Free
18 December 2012	(Spain) Armando Lozano	(Mexico) Veracruz	(Spain) Córdoba CF	Free
21 December 2012	(Spain) Jordi Figueras	(Belgium) Club Brugge K.V.	(Spain) Rayo Vallecano	Loan
24 December 2012	(Spain) Javier Farinós	Free agent	(Spain) Villarreal CF	Free
26 December 2012	(Colombia) Bernardo Espinosa	(Spain) Sevilla FC	(Spain) Sporting de Gijón	Loan
26 December 2012	(Spain) Raúl Fuster	(Spain) CD Lugo	(Spain) UD Salamanca	Free
26 December 2012	(Italy) Antonio Floro Flores	(Spain) Granada CF	(Italy) Udinese Calcio	Loan return
27 December 2012	(Spain) David Cortés	Free agent	(Spain) Hércules CF	Free
27 December 2012	(Spain) Javito Peral	Free agent	(Spain) Hércules CF	Free
28 December 2012	(Portugal) Roderick Miranda	(Spain) Deportivo de La Coruña	(Portugal) S.L. Benfica	Loan return
30 December 2012	(Spain) Chando	(Spain) Real Murcia	(Cyprus) AEK Larnaca F.C.	Free
30 December 2012	(Spain) Quini	(Spain) AD Alcorcón	(Spain) Racing de Santander	Loan
30 December 2012	(Brazil) Sandro Silva	(Brazil) Cruzeiro	(Spain) Málaga CF	Loan return
30 December 2012	(Brazil) Sandro Silva	(Spain) Málaga CF	(Brazil) Vasco da Gama	Loan
1 January 2013	(Bosnia and Herzegovina) Miroslav Stevanović	(Serbia) FK Vojvodina	(Spain) Sevilla FC	€1m
2 January 2013	(Norway) Vadim Demidov	(Germany) Eintracht Frankfurt	(Spain) Celta de Vigo	Loan
2 January 2013	(Spain) Ricardo López	Free agent	(Spain) CA Osasuna	Free
2 January 2013	(Spain) Iván Crespo	(Spain) CD Mirandés	(Spain) Deportivo Alavés	Free
2 January 2013	(Spain) Rubén Suárez	(China) Guizhou Renhe F.C.	(Spain) UD Almería	Free
2 January 2013	(Portugal) Sílvio	(Spain) Atlético Madrid	(Spain) Deportivo de La Coruña	Loan
2 January 2013	(Spain) Ramón Arcas	(Spain) Recreativo de Huelva	(Spain) FC Cartagena	Free
3 January 2013	(Denmark) Nicki Bille	(Spain) Rayo Vallecano	(Spain) Villarreal CF	Loan return
3 January 2013	(Denmark) Nicki Bille	(Spain) Villarreal CF	(Norway) Rosenborg BK	€2m
3 January 2013	(Nigeria) Kabiru Akinsola	(Spain) FC Cartagena	(Spain) Granada CF	Loan return
3 January 2013	(Nigeria) Kabiru Akinsola	(Spain) Granada CF	(Cyprus) Doxa Katokopias F.C.	Loan
3 January 2013	(Spain) Albert Puigdollers	(Scotland) Cowdenbeath F.C.	(Spain) Recreativo de Huelva	Free
3 January 2013	(Spain) Bernardo Domínguez	Free agent	(Spain) CD Mirandés	Free
4 January 2013	(Netherlands) Jeffrey Sarpong	(Spain) Hércules CF	(Spain) Real Sociedad	Loan return
4 January 2013	(Spain) Raúl Goni	(Spain) Real Zaragoza	(Spain) CE Sabadell FC	Free
4 January 2013	(France) John Ayina	(Spain) Córdoba CF	(Spain) Écija Balompié	Loan
4 January 2013	(Italy) Giuseppe Rossi	(Spain) Villarreal CF	(Italy) ACF Fiorentina	€9m
7 January 2013	(Brazil) Paulo Assunção	(Brazil) São Paulo FC	(Spain) Deportivo de La Coruña	Free
7 January 2013	(Spain) Aarón Ñíguez	(Spain) UD Almería	(Spain) Elche CF	Free
8 January 2013	(France) Noé Pamarot	Free agent	(Spain) Hércules CF	Free
8 January 2013	(Spain) Antonio Luna	(Spain) Sevilla FC	(Spain) RCD Mallorca	Loan
9 January 2013	(Spain) Cristian Bustos	(Spain) Celta de Vigo	(Spain) Sporting de Gijón	Loan
9 January 2013	(Spain) Recio	(Spain) Málaga CF	(Spain) Granada CF	Loan
9 January 2013	(Spain) Miguel Ángel Tena	(Spain) Córdoba CF	(Spain) CD Lugo	Free
10 January 2013	(Spain) Jordi Quintillà	(Spain) FC Barcelona B	(Spain) CF Badalona	Loan
10 January 2013	(Spain) Miguel Ángel Sáiz	(Spain) FC Barcelona B	(Spain) Real Betis B	Loan
10 January 2013	(Spain) Airam López	(Spain) CD Numancia	(Spain) CD Lugo	Free
10 January 2013	(Spain) Joan Tomàs	(Spain) Celta de Vigo	(Cyprus) AEK Larnaca F.C.	Free
10 January 2013	(Spain) Miguel de las Cuevas	(Spain) Sporting de Gijón	(Spain) CA Osasuna	Loan
10 January 2013	(France) Florian Lejeune	(Spain) Villarreal CF	(France) Stade Brestois 29	Loan
10 January 2013	(Spain) Gerardo Berodia	(Spain) CD Lugo	(Bolivia) Jorge Wilstermann	Free
10 January 2013	(Spain) Ion Echaide	(Spain) CA Osasuna	(Spain) SD Huesca	Loan
10 January 2013	(Spain) Marc Martínez	(Spain) SD Huesca	(Spain) Gimnàstic de Tarragona	Loan
11 January 2013	(Cape Verde) Valdo	(Mexico) Atlante F.C.	(Spain) Levante UD	Loan
11 January 2013	(Spain) José María Cases	(Spain) CD Mirandés	(Spain) Granada CF	Loan return
11 January 2013	(Spain) José María Cases	(Spain) Granada CF	(Spain) CD Alcoyano	Loan
11 January 2013	(Turkey) Nuri Şahin	(England) Liverpool F.C.	(Spain) Real Madrid C.F.	Loan return
11 January 2013	(Turkey) Nuri Şahin	(Spain) Real Madrid C.F.	(Germany) Borussia Dortmund	Loan
11 January 2013	(Portugal) Tiago Pinto	(Spain) Deportivo de La Coruña	(Portugal) Rio Ave F.C.	Loan return
11 January 2013	(Portugal) Tiago Pinto	(Portugal) Rio Ave F.C.	(Spain) Racing de Santander	Loan
11 January 2013	(Spain) Jonathan Mejía	(Spain) CD Ourense	(Spain) Granada CF	€20,000
12 January 2013	(Spain) Jonathan Mejía	(Spain) Granada CF	(Portugal) Vitória Guimarães	Loan
12 January 2013	(Argentina) Leonardo Ulloa	(Spain) UD Almería	(England) Brighton & Hove Albion F.C.	€1.8m
12 January 2013	(Netherlands) Jeffrey Sarpong	(Spain) Real Sociedad	(England) Stoke City F.C.	Trial
14 January 2013	(Bulgaria) Martin Petrov	(England) Bolton Wanderers F.C.	(Spain) RCD Espanyol	Free
14 January 2013	(Brazil) Gabriel Machado	(Romania) FC Steaua București	(Spain) Rayo Vallecano	Free
14 January 2013	(Spain) Juan Carlos Real	(Spain) Deportivo de La Coruña	(Spain) SD Huesca	Loan
15 January 2013	(Belgium) Roland Lamah	(Spain) CA Osasuna	(Wales) Swansea City A.F.C.	Loan
15 January 2013	(Spain) Juanmi Jiménez	(Spain) Málaga CF	(Spain) Racing de Santander	Loan
15 January 2013	(Spain) Pepe Díaz	(Spain) Córdoba CF	(Spain) Real Oviedo	Free
15 January 2013	(Spain) Toño García	(Spain) Villarreal CF B	(Spain) CE Sabadell FC	Loan
15 January 2013	(Argentina) Damián Petkoff	(Spain) Córdoba CF	(Spain) Real Jaén	Loan
16 January 2013	(Spain) Héctor Simón	(Spain) CE Sabadell FC	(Spain) Real Oviedo	Free
16 January 2013	(Brazil) Lucas Piazón	(England) Chelsea F.C.	(Spain) Málaga CF	Loan
16 January 2013	(Spain) Fran Sol	(Spain) CD Lugo	(Spain) Real Madrid C	Loan return
16 January 2013	(Spain) Fran Sol	(Spain) Real Madrid C	(Spain) Real Oviedo	Loan
17 January 2013	(Uruguay) Juan Ángel Albín	(Spain) RCD Espanyol	(Uruguay) Club Nacional	Loan
17 January 2013	(Spain) Joel Robles	(Spain) Atlético Madrid	(England) Wigan Athletic F.C.	Loan
17 January 2013	(Peru) Andy Pando	(Peru) Real Garcilaso	(Spain) UD Las Palmas	Free
17 January 2013	(Spain) Juanjo Serrano	(Spain) UD Logroñés	(Spain) CD Guadalajara	Free
17 January 2013	(Spain) Orlando Quintana	(Spain) SD Ponferradina	(Spain) Real Oviedo	Free
17 January 2013	(Spain) Antonio Guayre	Free agent	(Spain) CD Lugo	Free
17 January 2013	(Spain) Juan Quero	(Spain) Rayo Vallecano	(United Arab Emirates) Dubai CSC	Free
17 January 2013	(Brazil) Sueliton Pereira	(Spain) Rayo Vallecano	(Brazil) Criciúma EC	Free
18 January 2013	(Spain) Carlos Aranda	(Spain) Real Zaragoza	(Spain) Granada CF	€0.5m
18 January 2013	(Italy) Massimo Volta	(Spain) Levante UD	(Italy) U.C. Sampdoria	Loan return
18 January 2013	(Sweden) Guillermo Molins	(Belgium) R.S.C. Anderlecht	(Spain) Real Betis	Loan
19 January 2013	(Spain) José Manuel Fernández	(Spain) Córdoba CF	(Spain) Real Zaragoza	Loan
19 January 2013	(Portugal) Salvador Agra	(Spain) Real Betis	(Italy) A.C. Siena	Loan
19 January 2013	(Nigeria) Bartholomew Ogbeche	Free agent	(Spain) Xerez CD	Free
21 January 2013	(Spain) Juanma Barrero	(Spain) FC Cartagena	(Spain) SD Ponferradina	Free
21 January 2013	(Chile) Francisco Silva	(Chile) CD Universidad Católica	(Spain) CA Osasuna	Loan
21 January 2013	(Portugal) Hugo Vieira	(Spain) Sporting de Gijón	(Portugal) S.L. Benfica	Loan return
21 January 2013	(Uruguay) Diego Lugano	(France) Paris Saint-Germain F.C.	(Spain) Málaga CF	Loan
22 January 2013	(Spain) Manuel Arana	(Spain) Rayo Vallecano	(Spain) Recreativo de Huelva	Free
22 January 2013	(Venezuela) Josmar Zambrano	(Spain) CD Tenerife	(Spain) Recreativo de Huelva	Free
22 January 2013	(Venezuela) Josmar Zambrano	(Spain) Recreativo de Huelva	(Spain) CD San Roque de Lepe	Loan
22 January 2013	(Croatia) Danijel Pranjić	(Portugal) Sporting CP	(Spain) Celta de Vigo	Loan
22 January 2013	(Spain) José Antonio Dorado	(Spain) Real Betis	(Spain) Villarreal CF	Free
22 January 2013	(Spain) Manuel Bonaque	(Spain) Recreativo de Huelva	(Spain) Villarreal CF B	Loan
22 January 2013	(Argentina) David Abraham	(Spain) Getafe CF	(Germany) TSG 1899 Hoffenheim	€4m
22 January 2013	(Spain) Juanma Gómez	Free agent	(Spain) Villarreal CF	Free
22 January 2013	(Spain) Borja Vera	(Spain) UD Las Palmas	(Spain) CD San Roque de Lepe	Loan
22 January 2013	(Spain) Álvaro Vega	(Spain) CD San Roque de Lepe	(Spain) Recreativo de Huelva	Loan return
23 January 2013	(Brazil) Paulinho	(Brazil) EC Bahia	(Spain) Córdoba CF	Loan
23 January 2013	(Spain) Iago Falqué	(England) Tottenham Hotspur F.C.	(Spain) UD Almería	Loan
24 January 2013	(Spain) Daniel Toribio	(Spain) Villarreal CF	(Spain) Real Murcia	Free
24 January 2013	(Spain) Álvaro Silva	(Spain) Xerez CD	(Azerbaijan) FK Khazar Lankaran	Free
24 January 2013	(Greece) Theofanis Gekas	(Spain) Levante UD	(Turkey) Akhisar Belediyespor	Free
25 January 2013	(Spain) Isidoro Gómez	(Poland) Polonia Warsaw	(Spain) CD Numancia	Free
25 January 2013	(Spain) Sergio Escudero	(Germany) FC Schalke 04	(Spain) Getafe CF	Loan
25 January 2013	(Argentina) Emiliano Insúa	(Portugal) Sporting CP	(Spain) Atlético Madrid	€3.5m
25 January 2013	(Spain) Ariday Cabrera	(Spain) Girona FC	(Spain) Real Betis B	Free
25 January 2013	(Spain) Urko Vera	(Spain) SD Ponferradina	(Spain) AD Alcorcón	Free
25 January 2013	(Spain) Diego López	(Spain) Sevilla FC	(Spain) Real Madrid C.F.	€3.5m
26 January 2013	(France) Jérémy Perbet	(Belgium) R.A.E.C. Mons	(Spain) Villarreal CF	Loan
27 January 2013	(Spain) Anaitz Arbilla	(Spain) Hércules CF	(Spain) Rayo Vallecano	Free
27 January 2013	(Portugal) Nélson Marcos	(Spain) Real Betis	(Italy) U.S. Città di Palermo	Free
28 January 2013	(Argentina) Mario Paglialunga	(Italy) Calcio Catania	(Spain) Hércules CF	Loan
28 January 2013	(Scotland) Alan Hutton	(England) Aston Villa F.C.	(Spain) RCD Mallorca	Loan
28 January 2013	(Mexico) Javier Aquino	(Mexico) Cruz Azul	(Spain) Villarreal CF	€0.6m
28 January 2013	(Spain) Diego Seoane	(Spain) Deportivo de La Coruña	(Spain) Córdoba CF	Loan
29 January 2013	(Spain) Toni Doblas	(Spain) Real Zaragoza	(Azerbaijan) Xazar Lankaran	Free
29 January 2013	(Spain) Fernando Martínez	(Spain) UCAM Murcia CF	(Spain) Real Murcia	Loan return
29 January 2013	(Cameroon) Henri Bienvenu	(Turkey) Fenerbahçe S.K.	(Spain) Real Zaragoza	Loan
29 January 2013	(Spain) Antonio Longás	(Spain) Racing de Santander	(Spain) CE Sabadell FC	Free
29 January 2013	(Portugal) Rui Fonte	(Spain) RCD Espanyol	(Portugal) S.L. Benfica	Free
29 January 2013	(Spain) Nolito	(Portugal) S.L. Benfica	(Spain) Granada CF	Loan
29 January 2013	(Spain) Aitor Fernández	(Spain) Bilbao Athletic	(Spain) Villarreal CF	Free
29 January 2013	(Uruguay) Walter Pandiani	(Spain) Villarreal CF	(Spain) CD Atlético Baleares	Free
29 January 2013	(Argentina) Fernando Tissone	(Italy) U.C. Sampdoria	(Spain) RCD Mallorca	Loan
29 January 2013	(Spain) Dani Abalo	(Spain) Celta de Vigo	(Portugal) S.C. Beira-Mar	Loan
29 January 2013	(Brazil) Naldo Gomes	(Spain) Granada CF	(Italy) Bologna F.C. 1909	Loan
29 January 2013	(Spain) Pedro Martín	(Spain) Atlético Madrid	(Spain) CD Numancia	Loan
30 January 2013	(Spain) Marc Serramitja	(Spain) UE Llagostera	(Spain) Girona FC	Loan return
30 January 2013	(Spain) Marc Serramitja	(Spain) Girona FC	(Spain) UE Sant Andreu	Loan
30 January 2013	(Venezuela) Darwin Machís	(Spain) Granada CF	(Portugal) Vitória Guimarães	Loan
30 January 2013	(Portugal) Beto	(Portugal) S.C. Braga	(Spain) Sevilla FC	Loan
30 January 2013	(Spain) Baltasar Rigo	(Spain) CD Numancia	(Spain) CD Tenerife	Free
30 January 2013	(Italy) Robert Acquafresca	(Italy) Bologna F.C. 1909	(Spain) Levante UD	Loan
30 January 2013	(Spain) Ruymán Hernández	(Spain) Racing de Santander	(Spain) Recreativo de Huelva	Free
30 January 2013	(Spain) Gerard Bordas	(Spain) Villarreal CF	(Spain) Girona FC	Loan
30 January 2013	(Spain) Martí Crespí	(Ukraine) FC Chornomorets Odesa	(Spain) Racing de Santander	Free
30 January 2013	(Uruguay) Nacho González	(Belgium) Standard Liège	(Spain) Hércules CF	Free
31 January 2013	(Argentina) Fernando Cavenaghi	(Spain) Villarreal CF	(Mexico) Pachuca CF	Free
31 January 2013	(Spain) David Vázquez	(Spain) SD Huesca	(Spain) UD Melilla	Free
31 January 2013	(Argentina) Diego Buonanotte	(Spain) Málaga CF	(Spain) Granada CF	€2.3m
31 January 2013	(Greece) Loukas Vyntra	(Greece) Panathinaikos F.C.	(Spain) Levante UD	Free
31 January 2013	(Kosovo) Valdet Rama	(Sweden) Örebro SK	(Spain) Real Valladolid	Free
31 January 2013	(Chile) Pedro Morales	(Croatia) Dinamo Zagreb	(Spain) Málaga CF	Loan
31 January 2013	(Spain) Luis Morán	(Cyprus) AEK Larnaca F.C.	(Spain) CD Mirandés	Free
31 January 2013	(Spain) Rodrigo Ríos	(England) Sheffield Wednesday F.C.	(Spain) FC Barcelona B	Loan return
31 January 2013	(Spain) Rodrigo Ríos	(Spain) FC Barcelona B	(Spain) Real Zaragoza	Loan
31 January 2013	(Spain) Daniel Pacheco	(England) Liverpool F.C.	(Spain) SD Huesca	Loan
31 January 2013	(Spain) Jokin Arcaya	(Spain) SD Huesca	(Spain) CA Osasuna	Loan return
31 January 2013	(Spain) Jokin Arcaya	(Spain) CA Osasuna	(Greece) Panathinaikos F.C.	Free
31 January 2013	(Turkey) Emre Belözoğlu	(Spain) Atlético Madrid	(Turkey) Fenerbahçe S.K.	€0.35m
31 January 2013	(Spain) Jaime Romero	(Spain) Granada CF	(Turkey) Orduspor	Loan
31 January 2013	(Colombia) Dorlan Pabón	(Italy) Parma F.C.	(Spain) Real Betis	Loan
31 January 2013	(Argentina) Fede Fernández	(Italy) S.S.C. Napoli	(Spain) Getafe CF	Loan
31 January 2013	(Spain) Antonio Martínez	(Spain) Real Madrid Castilla	(Spain) CD Mirandés	Loan
31 January 2013	(Argentina) Fernando Gago	(Spain) Valencia CF	(Argentina) Vélez Sársfield	Loan
31 January 2013	(Spain) Aitor García	(Spain) Recreativo de Huelva	(Spain) Celta de Vigo B	Loan
31 January 2013	(Spain) Adrià Carmona	(Italy) A.C. Milan	(Spain) Real Zaragoza	Loan
31 January 2013	(Spain) Xisco Jiménez	(England) Newcastle United F.C.	(Spain) Córdoba CF	Free
31 January 2013	(Spain) Sergio Suárez	(Spain) UD Las Palmas	(Spain) CD Mirandés	Loan
31 January 2013	(Spain) David Rochela	(Spain) Racing de Santander	(Spain) Deportivo de La Coruña	Loan return
31 January 2013	(Spain) David Rochela	(Spain) Deportivo de La Coruña	(Israel) Hapoel Tel Aviv F.C.	Loan
31 January 2013	(Bolivia) Samuel Galindo	(Spain) CD Lugo	(England) Arsenal F.C.	Loan return
31 January 2013	(Spain) Ángel Rodríguez	(Spain) Levante UD	(Spain) Elche CF	Loan
31 January 2013	(Spain) Saúl Fernández	(Spain) Deportivo de La Coruña	(Spain) SD Ponferradina	Free
31 January 2013	(Ghana) Mohammed Abu	(Spain) Rayo Vallecano	(England) Manchester City F.C.	Loan return
31 January 2013	(Spain) Raúl Tamudo	(Mexico) C.F. Pachuca	(Spain) Rayo Vallecano	Free
31 January 2013	(Spain) Tyronne del Pino	(Spain) UD Las Palmas	(Spain) Barakaldo CF	Loan
31 January 2013	(Spain) Miguel Pallardó	(Spain) Levante UD	(Spain) UD Almería	Loan
31 January 2013	(Brazil) Kaká	(Hungary) Videoton FC	(Spain) Deportivo de La Coruña	Loan
31 January 2013	(Spain) Álex Bernal	(Spain) CD Mirandés	(Spain) Granada CF	Loan return
31 January 2013	(Spain) Álex Bernal	(Spain) Granada CF	(Spain) CD Leganés	Loan
31 January 2013	(Brazil) Carlos Henrique Casimiro	(Brazil) São Paulo FC	(Spain) Real Madrid Castilla	Loan
31 January 2013	(Spain) Miguel Alberto García	(Spain) Granada CF B	(Spain) SD Huesca	Loan
31 January 2013	(Spain) Jozabed Sánchez	(Spain) Sevilla Atlético	(Spain) SD Ponferradina	Free
31 January 2013	(Spain) Isaac Cuenca	(Spain) FC Barcelona	(Netherlands) Ajax Amsterdam	Loan
31 January 2013	(Spain) Nacho Monreal	(Spain) Málaga CF	(England) Arsenal F.C.	€13m
31 January 2013	(Spain) Jesús Tato	(Spain) Xerez CD	(Spain) UD Las Palmas	Free
31 January 2013	(Spain) Pere Martínez	(Spain) Hércules CF	(Spain) Atlético Madrid B	Loan
31 January 2013	(Portugal) Vitorino Antunes	(Portugal) F.C. Paços de Ferreira	(Spain) Málaga CF	Loan
31 January 2013	(Spain) Rubén Rochina	(England) Blackburn Rovers F.C.	(Spain) Real Zaragoza	Loan
31 January 2013	(Spain) Moisés Hurtado	(Spain) Granada CF	(Spain) Girona FC	Free
31 January 2013	(Uruguay) Andrés Lamas	(Spain) Recreativo de Huelva	(Spain) AD Alcorcón	Free
31 January 2013	(Philippines) Javier Patiño	(Spain) Córdoba CF	(Spain) Xerez CD	Loan
31 January 2013	(Spain) Ernesto Galán	(Spain) RCD Espanyol	(Spain) Xerez CD	Free
31 January 2013	(Chile) Fabián Orellana	(Spain) Granada CF	(Spain) Celta de Vigo	€1.2m
31 January 2013	(Spain) Jaime Jornet	(Spain) Elche CF	(Spain) CD Alcoyano	Free
31 January 2013	(Spain) Israel Bascón	(Spain) Xerez CD	(Greece) Veria F.C.	Loan
1 February 2013	(Spain) Juanmi Callejón	(Spain) Hércules CF	(Greece) Levadiakos F.C.	Free
1 February 2013	(Spain) Andreu Guerao	(Poland) Lechia Gdańsk	(Spain) Racing de Santander	Free
12 February 2013	(Spain) Fran Mérida	(Spain) Hércules CF	(Brazil) Clube Atlético Paranaense	€0.1m
12 February 2013	(Spain) Carmelo González	(Spain) Sporting de Gijón	(Thailand) Buriram United F.C.	Free
17 February 2013	(Spain) Samuel de los Reyes	(Spain) Sevilla Atlético	(Spain) CE Sabadell FC	Free
20 February 2013	(Spain) Oriol Lozano	(Spain) Real Murcia	(Georgia (country)) FC Zestafoni	Free
20 February 2013	(Spain) Javier Casquero	(Spain) UD Almería	(Spain) Sporting de Gijón	Free
27 February 2013	(Bosnia and Herzegovina) Emir Spahić	(Spain) Sevilla FC	(Russia) FC Anzhi Makhachkala	Loan
10 March 2013	(Philippines) Javier Patiño	(Spain) Xerez CD	(Spain) Córdoba CF	Loan return
10 March 2013	(Philippines) Javier Patiño	(Spain) Córdoba CF	(Thailand) Buriram United F.C.	€0.1m
11 March 2013	(Nigeria) Obafemi Martins	(Spain) Levante UD	(United States) Seattle Sounders FC	€3m
25 March 2013	(Mozambique) Simão Mate	(China) Shandong Luneng Taishan F.C.	(Spain) Levante UD	Free
27 March 2013	(Equatorial Guinea) Rodolfo Bodipo	(Spain) Deportivo de La Coruña	(Spain) Xerez CD	Free

== See also ==
- List of Spanish football transfers summer 2012
