= Óscar Vega =

Óscar Vega may refer to:

- Óscar Vega (boxer) (born 1965), Spanish boxer
- Óscar Vega (footballer) (born 1987), Spanish footballer
