= Óscar Vega (footballer) =

Spanish footballer

Personal information
- Full name: Óscar Vega Salinas
- Date of birth: 27 January 1987 (age 39)
- Place of birth: Pamplona, Spain
- Height: 1.75 m (5 ft 9 in)
- Position: Forward

Youth career
- Osasuna

Senior career*
Years	Team	Apps	(Gls)
2006–2010	Osasuna B	105	(20)
2010–2012	Osasuna	0	(0)
2010–2012	→ Huesca (loan)	17	(0)
2012–2013	Leganés	35	(4)
2013–2014	Real Sociedad	0	(0)
2013–2014	→ Real Unión (loan)	29	(1)
2014–2015	Conquense	33	(8)
2015–2016	Lleida Esportiu	34	(2)
2016–2019	Tudelano	69	(6)
- * Club domestic league appearances and goals as of 2 December 2018

Óscar Vega Salinas (born 27 January 1987) is a Spanish professional footballer who plays as a forward.

== Club career ==
Born in Pamplona, Navarre, Vega began his career at hometown club CA Osasuna. He made his debut for the reserves on 27 August 2006, scoring the only goal of a home win against Alicante CF in the Segunda División B but failing to find the net in the remaining 16 games of the season. On 25 October 2006 he made his only competitive appearance for the first team, in the first leg of the quarter-finals of the Copa del Rey, coming on as a substitute for Roberto Soldado for the final 13 minutes of a goalless draw at Peña Sport FC.

On 2 July 2010, Vega and his Osasuna teammates Jokin Esparza and Jorge Galán were loaned to SD Huesca. He featured sparingly over the course of two Segunda División campaigns, starting only once.

Vega returned to the third level by signing for CD Leganés for 2012–13. He then agreed to a one-year deal with the option for a second with La Liga club Real Sociedad, who loaned him immediately to Basque neighbours Real Unión also from division three. He scored only once in 30 official matches for the Irun-based team, in a 1–2 away league loss to CD Puerta Bonita on 11 May 2014.

In the following years, Vega continued competing in the third tier, representing UB Conquense and Lleida Esportiu. On 26 October 2014, whilst with the former, he opened an 8–1 home routing of Barakaldo CF, but the season ended in relegation.

On 30 January 2019, CD Tudelano announced that Vega was suffering from a deep vein thrombosis that was preventing him from playing. Therefore, they decided to terminate the contract by mutual consent.
