= Galder Cerrajería =

Spanish footballer

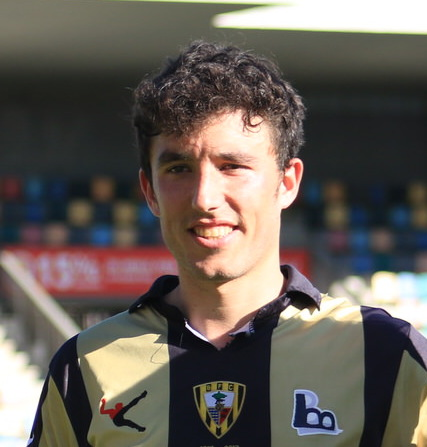

Personal information
- Full name: Galder Cerrajería López
- Date of birth: 5 April 1989 (age 37)
- Place of birth: Barakaldo, Spain
- Height: 1.85 m (6 ft 1 in)
- Position: Midfielder

Youth career
- Ibaibe
- 2001–2004: Athletic Bilbao
- 2004–2007: Retuerto
- 2007–2008: Santutxu

Senior career*
Years	Team	Apps	(Gls)
2008–2009	Basconia	24	(1)
2009–2012	Bilbao Athletic	61	(5)
2011–2012	→ Murcia (loan)	23	(0)
2012–2013	Oviedo	30	(4)
2013–2014	Burgos	33	(2)
2014–2018	Barakaldo	126	(18)
2018–2020	Mirandés	28	(1)
2020–2021	Burgos	28	(2)
2021–2022	Cultural Leonesa	23	(1)
2022–2023	Racing Rioja	29	(2)
- * Club domestic league appearances and goals as of 14 May 2023

Galder Cerrajería López (born 5 April 1989) is a Spanish professional footballer who plays as a central midfielder.

== Club career ==
Born in Barakaldo, Biscay, Cerrajería spent three years at Athletic Bilbao's youth academy, then returned to the club in 2008 to represent both the farm team CD Basconia and the reserves, spending two full seasons with the latter in Segunda División B. In 2011–12 he was promoted to the Basques' main squad, but was loaned to Real Murcia in August.

Cerrajería made his debut with the Segunda División club against RC Celta de Vigo on 28 August 2011, playing 32 minutes in a 1–3 home loss. His contract with Athletic was mutually terminated in August 2012, and he signed with Real Oviedo shortly after.

Cerrajería spent the vast majority of his remaining career in the third tier, mainly at the service of Barakaldo CF. In 2021, the 32-year-old achieved promotion to the second with Burgos CF.
