= Jorge Larrosa =

Spanish footballer (born 1985)

Personal information
- Full name: Jorge Larrosa Bolea
- Date of birth: 16 December 1985 (age 40)
- Place of birth: Huesca, Spain
- Height: 1.81 m (5 ft 11 in)
- Position: Goalkeeper

Youth career
- Peñas Oscenses

Senior career*
Years	Team	Apps	(Gls)
2004–2005	Sariñena		
2005–2006	Jacetano		
2006–2012	Huesca	10	(0)
2012–2013	Barbastro	14	(0)
2014–2015	Almudévar		
- * Club domestic league appearances and goals

Jorge Larrosa Bolea (born 16 December 1985) is a Spanish former footballer who played as a goalkeeper.

== Football career ==
Born in Huesca, Aragon, Larrosa played the vast majority of his career in lower league football. He spent six seasons under contract to local club SD Huesca and, on 31 October 2009, he appeared in his first and only match in Segunda División: after Miguel was sent off in the 23rd minute of the away fixture against Córdoba CF, he replaced field player Lluís Sastre and conceded twice in a 1–2 loss.

In 2012, Larrosa signed with neighbouring UD Barbastro in Tercera División.
