= Josmar Zambrano =

Venezuelan footballer (born 1992)

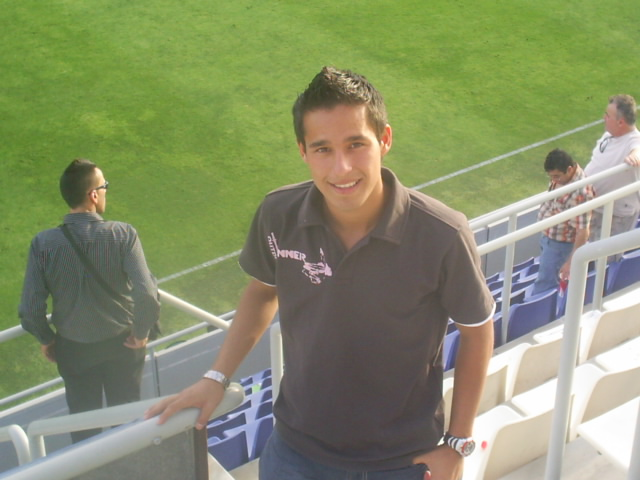

Personal information
- Full name: Josmar Jesús Zambrano Suárez
- Date of birth: 9 June 1992 (age 34)
- Place of birth: San Cristóbal, Venezuela
- Height: 1.69 m (5 ft 6 1/2 in)
- Position: Attacking midfielder

Team information
- Current team: Ureña
- Number: 7

Youth career
- 2008–2009: Tenerife

Senior career*
Years	Team	Apps	(Gls)
2009–2011	Tenerife B	37	(2)
2010–2013	Tenerife	10	(0)
2012	→ Zamora (loan)	8	(0)
2013–2014	Recreativo B	0	(0)
2013	→ San Roque (loan)	8	(0)
2014	Recreativo	2	(0)
2015–2017	Deportivo La Guaira	0	(0)
2015–2017	→ Zulia (loan)	42	(2)
2017	Deportivo Táchira	18	(0)
2018	Metropolitanos	18	(1)
2019	Estudiantes Caracas	33	(1)
2020	Mineros de Guayana	16	(1)
2021	Defensores de Belgrano	1	(0)
2021	JJ Urquiza	1	(0)
2022	Aragua	10	(0)
2023–	Ureña	25	(5)

International career
2011	Venezuela	2	(0)
- * Club domestic league appearances and goals as of 17:51, 24 November 2023 (UTC)

Josmar Jesús Zambrano Suárez (born 9 June 1992) is a Venezuelan professional footballer who plays for Ureña as an attacking midfielder.

== Club career ==
Zambrano was born in San Cristóbal, Táchira. He finished his formation with CD Tenerife in Spain, signing his first professional contract on 25 August 2010 shortly after his 18th birthday.

Zambrano made his official debut for the Canary Islands side on 1 September 2010, coming on as a late substitute for Iriome González in a 1–4 away loss against Elche CF in the season's Copa del Rey. His first league appearance came the following month, as he played 12 minutes in a 1–3 defeat at FC Barcelona B in the Segunda División.

Zambrano's form for Tenerife's reserves attracted attention from bigger clubs such as FC Barcelona and Sevilla FC. Nothing came of it and, on 29 December 2011, he returned to his country and joined Zamora FC on loan.

Zambrano could not found his room in Tenerife's first team after his return, and he terminated his link on 18 January 2013. Four days later he signed with Recreativo de Huelva, being immediately loaned to CD San Roque de Lepe in Segunda División B.

On 30 December 2014, Zambrano cut ties with Recre and joined Deportivo La Guaira, being immediately loaned to Zulia FC also in Venezuela.
