= Ruymán Hernández =

Spanish footballer (born 1986)

Ruymán
Personal information
- Full name: Ruymán Jesús Hernández Perera
- Date of birth: 15 October 1986 (age 40)
- Place of birth: Arucas, Spain
- Height: 1.83 m (6 ft 0 in)
- Position: Centre-back

Youth career
- Las Palmas

Senior career*
Years	Team	Apps	(Gls)
2004–2010	Las Palmas B	58	(6)
2005–2012	Las Palmas	69	(3)
2005–2006	→ San Isidro (loan)	27	(2)
2007	→ Santa Brígida (loan)	18	(2)
2009–2010	→ Vecindario (loan)	33	(0)
2012–2013	Racing Santander	5	(0)
2013–2014	Recreativo	31	(2)
2014–2016	Llagostera	30	(1)
2016–2017	Mirandés	5	(0)
2018	Arucas		
2018–2019	Al Hoceima	24	(3)
2020–2022	Arucas	35	(1)
Total		335	(20)
- * Club domestic league appearances and goals

Ruymán Jesús Hernández Perera (born 15 October 1986 in Arucas, Las Palmas, Gran Canaria), known simply as Ruymán, is a Spanish former professional footballer who played as a central defender.
