= Kabiru Akinsola =

Nigerian footballer (born 1991)

Personal information
- Full name: Kabiru Akinsola Olarewaju
- Date of birth: 21 January 1991 (age 35)
- Place of birth: Lagos State, Nigeria
- Height: 1.74 m (5 ft 9 in)
- Position: Forward

Youth career
- Clique Sports Academy

Senior career*
Years	Team	Apps	(Gls)
2009	Étoile Sportive	1	(0)
2009–2010	Salamanca	15	(2)
2010–2011	Zamora	32	(11)
2011–2013	Granada	0	(0)
2011–2012	→ Cádiz (loan)	37	(13)
2012	→ Cartagena (loan)	10	(0)
2013	→ Doxa (loan)	8	(0)
2013–2014	Hospitalet	28	(5)
2014	CSMS Iași	2	(0)
2015	Sunshine Stars	4	(2)
2016	Mérida	0	(0)

International career
2007	Nigeria U17		
- * Club domestic league appearances and goals as of 6 May 2016

Kabiru Akinsola Olarewaju(born 21 January 1991 in Lagos State), known as Akinsola, is a Nigerian footballer who plays as a forward.

== Club career ==
On 6 January 2009, Étoile Sportive du Sahel announced the signing of 18-year-old Akinsola, who agree to a five-year deal at Stade Olympique de Sousse. However, his official debut was delayed due to the fact he was appearing at the African Youth Championship in Kigali.

Akinsola apparently had plenty of suitors vying for his signature, but decided to link up with the Tunisians, joining countryman Emeka Opara. On 31 January, however, he changed clubs again, signing a 3+2 contract with Spain's UD Salamanca and appearing rarely over the course of two second division seasons, his first competitive appearance only taking place on 9 May due to bureaucratic problems; additionally, he spent several weeks on the sidelines with a thigh injury.

In the summer of 2010, Akinsola stayed in Spain but dropped down to the third level, moving to Zamora CF. He continued competing in that tier in the following years with Cádiz CF, FC Cartagena and CE L'Hospitalet, this being interspersed by a brief spell in Cyprus.

== International career ==
Akinsola came into prominence in 2007, when he appeared for the Nigeria under-17 team in the African Youth Championship in Togo and scored the winning goal in the final match. He represented his country at the 2007 FIFA U-17 World Cup in the Korea Republic, winning the competition with the Golden Eaglet.

== Honours ==
- FIFA U-17 World Cup: 2007
