= Marc Martínez (footballer, born 1986) =

Spanish footballer

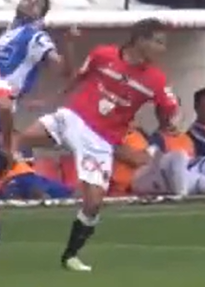
- Martínez playing for Gimnàstic in 2013

Personal information
- Full name: Marc Martínez Castillero
- Date of birth: 11 April 1986 (age 40)
- Place of birth: Barcelona, Spain
- Height: 1.70 m (5 ft 7 in)
- Position: Midfielder

Youth career
- Barcelona

Senior career*
Years	Team	Apps	(Gls)
2005–2006	Barcelona C	24	(3)
2006–2008	Valladolid B	53	(2)
2008–2009	Conquense	14	(2)
2009–2010	Águilas	22	(5)
2010–2011	Roquetas	34	(2)
2011–2012	Sant Andreu	31	(3)
2012–2014	Huesca	36	(0)
2013	→ Gimnàstic (loan)	18	(2)
2014–2015	Gimnàstic	21	(0)
2015–2016	Lleida Esportiu	34	(5)
2016–2017	Llagostera	32	(3)
2017–2018	Sabadell	28	(0)
2018–2021	Lleida Esportiu	51	(6)
2021–2024	Manresa	69	(7)

International career
2001	Spain U16	1	(0)
2004	Spain U19	2	(0)
- * Club domestic league appearances and goals

Marc Martínez Castillero (born 11 April 1986) is a Spanish former footballer who played as a central midfielder.

== Club career ==
Born in Barcelona, Catalonia, Martínez started playing football in FC Barcelona's youth system. In 2006, he joined Real Valladolid, spending his first years as a professional with the reserve team.

On 7 June 2008, Martínez signed a contract with UB Conquense. He continued to compete in the Segunda División B the following three seasons, with Águilas CF, CD Roquetas and UE Sant Andreu; in April 2012, he suffered a thigh injury, which ruled him out for the rest of the campaign.

Martínez moved to Segunda División side SD Huesca on 8 July 2012. He made his league debut on 17 August, coming off the bench for Antonio Núñez in the dying minutes of a 1–0 away win against CD Mirandés.

On 10 January 2013, Martínez was loaned to third division club Gimnàstic de Tarragona until the end of the season. He returned to Huesca in June, and on 6 July of the following year joined the former in a permanent deal.

On 14 August 2015, after achieving promotion to division two, Martínez terminated his contract with Gimnàstic, Hours later, he signed for neighbouring Lleida Esportiu.

On 5 July 2018, after one season apiece in the third tier with UE Llagostera and CE Sabadell FC, the 32-year-old Martínez returned to Lleida.
