= Pere Martínez =

Spanish footballer

Pere
Personal information
- Full name: Pere Martínez Sastre
- Date of birth: 24 July 1991 (age 35)
- Place of birth: Sabadell, Spain
- Height: 1.77 m (5 ft 10 in)
- Position: Right back

Youth career
- 1997–2002: Sabadell
- 2002–2010: Espanyol

Senior career*
Years	Team	Apps	(Gls)
2009–2010	Espanyol B	8	(0)
2010–2012	Villarreal C	25	(1)
2011–2012	Villarreal B	26	(1)
2012–2013	Hércules	10	(0)
2013	→ Atlético Madrid B (loan)	2	(0)
2013–2014	Espanyol B	14	(0)
2014–2019	Cornellà	141	(4)
2019–2020	Rayo Majadahonda	13	(0)
2020	Burgos	5	(0)
2020–2022	Llagostera	48	(1)
2022–2023	Cornellà	19	(1)
2023–2024	Cerdanyola del Vallès	8	(0)
- * Club domestic league appearances and goals as of 14 January 2024

Pere Martínez Sastre (born 24 July 1991), known simply as Pere, is a Spanish footballer who plays as a right back.

== Club career ==
Born in Sabadell, Barcelona, Catalonia, Pere was a product of local RCD Espanyol's youth system. He made his senior debut in 2009–10 with the reserves in the third division, first appearing on 25 October 2009 in a 0–0 home draw against Orihuela CF as the season ended in relegation.

In the summer of 2010, Pere signed for Villarreal CF, starting playing with the C-team in the fourth level. After one season, he was promoted to the reserve side in division two, making his official debut on 18 September 2011 against CD Guadalajara and playing the full 90 minutes in a 3–3 home draw.

Pere scored his first professional goal on 16 May 2012, netting his team's second in a 4–2 home win over SD Huesca. He appeared in 26 matches during the campaign, being relegated despite finishing twelfth, and on 16 August he moved to fellow league club Hércules CF by agreeing to a three-year deal.

On 31 January 2013, Pere was loaned to Atlético Madrid B until June. On 12 July, however, he terminated his contract with the Valencians and moved back to Espanyol B.

On 28 August 2014, Pere signed for UE Cornellà, newly promoted to the third level. On 5 July 2019, after five full campaigns with the club, he moved to CF Rayo Majadahonda in the same division. After a short spell at Burgos CF, Pere joined UE Llagostera in August 2020.

On 3 August 2022, Pere was announced at Cornellà.
