= Marc Serramitja =

Spanish footballer

Personal information
- Full name: Marc Serramitja Taberner
- Date of birth: 4 August 1990 (age 36)
- Place of birth: La Cellera de Ter, Spain
- Height: 1.73 m (5 ft 8 in)
- Position: Attacking midfielder

Team information
- Current team: Palamós

Youth career
- Girona

Senior career*
Years	Team	Apps	(Gls)
2009–2014	Girona	1	(0)
2009–2010	→ Gavà (loan)	32	(1)
2010–2011	→ Alicante (loan)	37	(3)
2011–2012	→ Badalona (loan)	26	(2)
2012–2013	→ Llagostera (loan)	15	(2)
2013	→ Sant Andreu (loan)	13	(0)
2014	Kristiansund	2	(0)
2014–2016	Figueres	64	(9)
2016–2017	Palamós	37	(7)
2017–2018	Poblense	17	(2)
2018–	Constancia	31	(5)
- * Club domestic league appearances and goals as of 13 June 2019

Marc Serramitja Taberner (born 4 August 1990) is a Spanish professional footballer who plays for Palamós CF as an attacking midfielder.

== Club career ==
Born in La Cellera de Ter, Girona, Catalonia, Serramitja started playing with Girona FC, making his professional debut on 20 June 2009, in a 1–3 home defeat against SD Huesca. A month later, he joined CF Gavà in a season-long loan deal.

In July 2010, Serramitja was loaned to Alicante CF. A season later, he joined CF Badalona, again on loan. In July 2012, Serramitja joined UE Llagostera. On 30 January 2013, he left Llagostera and joined UE Sant Andreu in a six-month loan deal.

Serramitja subsequently returned to the albirrojos, and was released. On 31 January 2014 he moved abroad for the first time in his career, signing a two-year deal with Kristiansund BK. Serramitja made his debut on 1 May, coming on as a late substitute in a 3–3 draw at Strømmen IF. On 18 June, however, he was released by mutual consent.

On 29 July 2014 Serramitja moved to UE Figueres. After a trial period with American club Columbus Crew SC during July 2016, he signed for Palamós CF on 9 August of that year.
