= Raúl Goni =

Spanish footballer

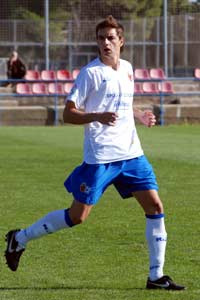
- Goni training with Zaragoza in 2008

Personal information
- Full name: Raúl Goni Bayo
- Date of birth: 12 October 1988 (age 38)
- Place of birth: Zaragoza, Spain
- Height: 1.86 m (6 ft 1 in)
- Position: Centre-back

Youth career
- UD Montecarlo
- Amistad
- Zaragoza

Senior career*
Years	Team	Apps	(Gls)
2007–2009	Zaragoza B		
2007–2013	Zaragoza	19	(0)
2010–2011	→ Real Madrid B (loan)	21	(1)
2011–2012	→ Cartagena (loan)	16	(0)
2013–2014	Sabadell	10	(0)
2015	Zaragoza B	17	(0)
2015–2016	Teruel	31	(1)
Total		114	(2)

International career
2006	Spain U19	1	(0)
2009	Spain U21	1	(0)
- * Club domestic league appearances and goals

Raúl Goni Bayo (born 12 October 1988) is a Spanish former professional footballer who played as a central defender.

== Club career ==
Goni was born in Zaragoza, Aragon. A product of Real Zaragoza's youth ranks, he made his first-team – and La Liga – debut on 31 October 2007 in a 1–0 away win against UD Almería, but spent his first two professional seasons, however, mainly registered with the reserves.

In the 2010–11 campaign, Goni played with Real Madrid Castilla of Segunda División B on loan, being regularly used during his spell (20 games in the regular season plus one in the playoffs) and subsequently returning to Zaragoza.

== International career ==
Goni won his only cap for the Spain under-21 side on 10 February 2009, featuring 21 minutes as a starter in a 1–1 friendly draw with Norway held in Cartagena.
