= Álvaro Vega =

Spanish footballer (born 1991)

Personal information
- Full name: Álvaro Vega Suárez
- Date of birth: 15 March 1991 (age 35)
- Place of birth: Huelva, Spain
- Height: 1.82 m (6 ft 0 in)
- Position: Centre-back

Youth career
- 2003–2006: Recreativo
- 2006–2010: Espanyol

Senior career*
Years	Team	Apps	(Gls)
2009	Espanyol B	2	(0)
2010–2011	Recreativo B	29	(1)
2011–2014	Recreativo	10	(0)
2012–2013	→ San Roque (loan)	18	(1)
2014	Granada B	12	(0)
2014–2015	Badalona	33	(2)
2015–2017	Linares	61	(1)
2017–2018	Badalona	36	(3)
2018–2019	Atlético Baleares	30	(1)
2019–2020	Linense	17	(0)
2020	Cornellà	3	(0)
2020–2022	Rayo Majadahonda	42	(1)
2022–2024	Alcoyano	59	(1)
2024–2025	Sanluqueño	5	(0)
Total		357	(11)
- * Club domestic league appearances and goals

Álvaro Vega Suárez (born 15 March 1991) is a Spanish former professional footballer who played as a central defender.

== Club career ==
Born in Huelva, Andalusia, Vega graduated from RCD Espanyol's youth setup, and made his senior debut for the reserves in the 2009–10 season, in the Segunda División B. In January 2010 he joined another reserve team, Atlético Onubense of Tercera División.

Vega made his debut with the first team of the latter on 27 August 2011, starting in a 1–0 away loss against Deportivo de La Coruña in the Segunda División. He appeared in four matches during the season and renewed his contract on 13 August 2012, being immediately loaned to third-tier CD San Roque de Lepe.

Vega returned to Recre in January 2013, being definitely promoted to the main squad. After appearing sparingly, he moved to Granada CF on 17 January of the following year, being assigned to the B side.

In June 2014, Vega was deemed surplus to requirements by Granada. He cut ties with the club on 28 August, and signed for CF Badalona hours later.

Vega remained in the third division until his retirement aged 34, representing Linares Deportivo, Badalona, CD Atlético Baleares, Real Balompédica Linense, UE Cornellà, CF Rayo Majadahonda, CD Alcoyano and Atlético Sanluqueño CF.
