= Álex Bernal =

Spanish footballer (born 1991)

Personal information
- Full name: Alejandro Bernal Carreras
- Date of birth: 3 March 1991 (age 35)
- Place of birth: Seville, Spain
- Height: 1.75 m (5 ft 9 in)
- Position: Midfielder

Team information
- Current team: Recreativo
- Number: 15

Youth career
- Betis

Senior career*
Years	Team	Apps	(Gls)
2010–2012	Betis B	56	(5)
2012–2013	Granada	0	(0)
2012–2013	→ Mirandés (loan)	4	(0)
2013	→ Leganés (loan)	14	(0)
2013–2015	Huesca	32	(1)
2015–2016	La Hoya Lorca	36	(2)
2016–2018	Mérida	42	(3)
2018–2021	Marbella	95	(2)
2021–2023	Córdoba	38	(0)
2023–2025	Eldense	74	(2)
2025–	Recreativo	32	(4)
- * Club domestic league appearances and goals as of 7 May 2026

Alejandro 'Álex' Bernal Carreras (born 3 March 1991) is a Spanish footballer who plays as a central midfielder for Recreativo de Huelva. Having made four Segunda División appearances for Mirandés, he spent most of his career in Segunda División B, making over 250 appearances for six clubs.

== Football career ==
Born in Seville, Andalusia, Bernal was a product of hometown Real Betis' youth system, and made senior debuts with the reserves in the 2010–11 season in Segunda División B, appearing regularly during his two-year spell with the team.

On 25 July 2012, Bernal joined La Liga club Granada CF: despite appearing with the first team in the pre-season, he was loaned to newly promoted CD Mirandés in Segunda División. He played his first game as a professional on 25 August, featuring the last 14 minutes in a 0–1 away loss against Recreativo de Huelva.

After being rarely used, Bernal moved to CD Leganés in the following transfer window, on the same basis. On 22 August 2013, he signed for fellow third-level side SD Huesca. Halfway through their title-winning season, having made only one start, he rescinded his contract in January 2015 and moved to La Hoya Lorca CF.

In August 2016, Bernal signed for Mérida AD under manager José Miguel Campos, with whom he had worked at four other teams. He left the club at the midpoint of their doomed campaign on 31 January 2018, joining Marbella FC of the same league on an 18-month contract. At the end of this deal, he got a two-year extension.

On 30 July 2021, Bernal joined Segunda División RFEF side Córdoba CF on a 1+1 deal. He helped in their promotion to Primera Federación, but left on 16 January 2023 to join fellow third division side CD Eldense; with the latter side, he was mainly used as a substitute as they returned to the second level after 59 years.

On 20 June 2025, after suffering relegation, Bernal returned to the fourth division with Recreativo de Huelva.
