= Juanjo (footballer, born 1981) =

Spanish footballer

Personal information
- Full name: Juan José Serrano Macías
- Date of birth: 3 October 1981 (age 45)
- Place of birth: Calamonte, Spain
- Height: 1.84 m (6 ft 0 in)
- Position: Striker

Youth career
- Mérida

Senior career*
Years	Team	Apps	(Gls)
2000–2001	Mérida Promesas	36	(26)
2001–2003	Atlético Madrid B	40	(3)
2003–2004	Alcorcón	30	(5)
2004–2005	Díter Zafra	34	(6)
2005–2006	Jaén	31	(4)
2006–2007	Lanzarote	36	(14)
2007–2008	Mazarrón	33	(3)
2008–2009	Conquense	29	(2)
2009–2010	Villanovense	36	(21)
2010–2011	Guadalajara	37	(20)
2011–2013	Granada	0	(0)
2011–2012	→ Cádiz (loan)	29	(9)
2012–2013	→ Logronés (loan)	13	(0)
2013	Guadalajara	16	(4)
2013–2014	Lugo	16	(0)
2014–2015	Mirandés	31	(2)
2015–2017	Villanovense	59	(9)
2017–2019	Santa Amalia		
- * Club domestic league appearances and goals as of 25 November 2018

Juan José Serrano Macías (born 3 October 1981), commonly known as Juanjo, is a Spanish former footballer who played as a striker.

== Club career ==
Juanjo was born in Calamonte, Province of Badajoz. After starting his senior career with local Mérida UD's reserve team, he went on to spend one full decade in Segunda División B. He first represented at that level Atlético Madrid B, AD Alcorcón, CD Díter Zafra, Real Jaén, UD Lanzarote, Mazarrón CF, UB Conquense, CF Villanovense and CD Guadalajara.

Juanjo joined La Liga club Granada CF in 2011 but never represented it officially, being loaned to Cádiz CF and UD Logroñés in the same tier. On 20 January 2013 he terminated his contract and returned to Guadalajara, signing a two-and-a-half-year deal.

Aged already 31, Juanjo made his first appearance in Segunda División on 26 January 2013, starting in a 0–2 away loss against Girona FC. His first goal with the professionals came on 30 March as he scored the only at UD Las Palmas, and he netted a second the following weekend, contributing to a 3–1 home victory over Córdoba CF.

On 23 August 2013, Juanjo moved to fellow league side CD Lugo. He totalled only 603 minutes of action in his first and only season, and subsequently joined CD Mirandés also of the second division.

After one season on Lugo, Juanjo played the 2014-15 Segunda División for CD Mirandés, and in the next two seasons for Segunda División B club CF Villanovense.

On 18 July 2017 he joined to CD Santa Amalia on Tercera División. Juanjo retired as a player in August 2019.
