= José María Cases =

Spanish footballer

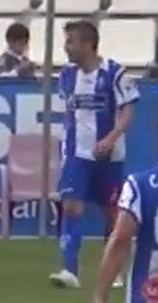
- Cases playing for Alcoyano in 2013

Personal information
- Full name: José María Cases Hernández
- Date of birth: 23 November 1986 (age 39)
- Place of birth: Orihuela, Spain
- Height: 1.72 m (5 ft 8 in)
- Position: Midfielder

Youth career
- EMF Orihuela
- Villarreal

Senior career*
Years	Team	Apps	(Gls)
2003–2005	Villarreal B		
2003–2005	Villarreal	2	(0)
2005–2006	Terrassa	22	(3)
2006–2008	Orihuela	62	(9)
2008–2009	Eibar	25	(0)
2009–2010	Valencia B	25	(2)
2010–2012	Orihuela	51	(9)
2012–2013	Granada	0	(0)
2012	→ Cádiz (loan)	15	(1)
2012–2013	→ Mirandés (loan)	7	(0)
2013	→ Alcoyano (loan)	18	(5)
2013–2015	Panthrakikos	47	(10)
2015–2017	Eupen	54	(8)
2017–2018	Doxa Drama	20	(6)
2018–2021	Orihuela	59	(10)
2022	Callosa Deportiva	10	(1)

International career
2003	Spain U17	12	(5)
Medal record
Representing Spain
Men's football
FIFA U-17 World Cup
Runner-up	2003 Finland
UEFA European Under-17 Championship
Runner-up	2003 Portugal
- * Club domestic league appearances and goals

José María Cases Hernández (born 23 November 1986) is a Spanish former professional footballer who played as a midfielder.

== Club career ==
Born in Orihuela, Valencian Community, Cases finished his development at Villarreal CF and started competing as a senior with the reserves in Tercera División. He made his professional debut at 16 on 22 June 2003, playing 28 minutes as a substitute for Héctor Font in a 4–1 La Liga home loss to Real Betis; over the next two seasons, he played only three more times for the Yellow Submarine, all off the bench, including once in the 2004–05 edition of the UEFA Cup.

Cases spent the following campaign at Terrassa FC in Segunda División B, before joining his hometown club Orihuela CF also in that level. On 15 June 2008, he signed a two-year deal at Segunda División's SD Eibar on the expiration of his contract, despite having a previous agreement to join UD Salamanca when free. He started in 13 of his appearances for the Basques, who suffered relegation.

Cases subsequently had a year at Valencia CF Mestalla, who fell into the fourth division, before returning to Orihuela. He was bought by Granada CF in summer 2012, being successively loaned to Cádiz CF, CD Mirandés, and CD Alcoyano.

On 22 June 2013, Cases moved abroad for the first time, signing for Panthrakikos in the Super League Greece. He switched countries again on 2 August 2015, when he agreed to a two-year deal with K.A.S. Eupen of the Belgian Second Division. On 13 September, four minutes after replacing countryman Víctor Curto, he received a straight red card in an eventual 4–1 home loss to Lierse SK, but his two-match suspension was rescinded on appeal.

On 22 September 2017, 30-year-old Cases joined Doxa Drama F.C. in the Greek second level.

== Personal life ==
Cases' older brother, Manuel, played in the same position for five teams including Orihuela, never any higher than the third tier.
