= Jokin Esparza =

Spanish footballer (born 1988)

Personal information
- Full name: Jokin Arcaya Esparza
- Date of birth: 15 June 1988 (age 38)
- Place of birth: Pamplona, Spain
- Height: 1.77 m (5 ft 10 in)
- Position: Midfielder

Youth career
- Osasuna

Senior career*
Years	Team	Apps	(Gls)
2006–2008	Osasuna B	66	(0)
2007–2011	Osasuna	11	(0)
2009	→ Huesca (loan)	16	(1)
2010–2011	→ Huesca (loan)	27	(1)
2011–2013	Huesca	42	(3)
2013	Panathinaikos	8	(0)
2014	Zamora	6	(0)
2014–2015	Veria	4	(0)
2015–2017	Toledo	59	(3)
2017–2018	Mérida	36	(1)
2018–2022	Toledo	97	(11)

International career
2006	Spain U19	3	(0)
- * Club domestic league appearances and goals as of 11:38, 16 December 2022 (UTC)

Jokin Arcaya Esparza (born 15 June 1988) is a Spanish professional footballer who plays as a left midfielder.

== Club career ==
Esparza was born in Pamplona, Navarre. After emerging through local CA Osasuna's youth academy, he made his La Liga debut on 17 June 2007 in a 1–2 home loss against Atlético Madrid. He would only appear in five more matches for the first team in the following two seasons combined, however, which prompted a loan to Segunda División club SD Huesca in January 2009; he was relatively used during his first spell, as they retained their recently acquired status.

For the 2010–11 campaign, Esparza was again loaned to Huesca in a season-long move. In August 2011, he signed a permanent deal with the Aragonese.

In February 2013, Esparza joined Panathinaikos of the Super League Greece, agreeing to a six-month contract. In late May of the following year, after a brief spell back in his country with lowly Zamora CF, he moved to another Greek top flight side, Veria FC.
