= List of Spanish football transfers summer 2013 =

This is a list of Spanish football transfers for the 2013–14 season of La Liga and the Segunda División. Only moves from La Liga and the Segunda División are listed.

The summer transfer window began on 1 July 2013, although a few transfers took place prior to that date. The window closed at midnight on 2 September 2013. Players without a club could join one at any time, either during or in between transfer windows. Clubs below La Liga level could also sign players on loan at any time. If need be, clubs could sign a goalkeeper on an emergency loan, if all others were unavailable.

Where there is no flag, the player or club can be assumed to be Spanish or affiliated to the Royal Spanish Football Federation.

== Summer 2013 La Liga transfer window ==
Date	Name	Moving from	Moving to	Fee
24 January 2013	Fernando Llorente	Athletic Bilbao	(Italy) Juventus	Free
5 February 2013	Manu Lanzarote	Sabadell	Espanyol	Free
25 April 2013	(Uruguay) José María Giménez	(Uruguay) Danubio	Atlético Madrid	€1m
21 May 2013	(Portugal) Edinho	(Portugal) Académica de Coimbra	Málaga	Loan return
21 May 2013	(Portugal) Edinho	Málaga	(Portugal) Braga	Free
23 May 2013	(Venezuela) Fernando Amorebieta	Athletic Bilbao	(England) Fulham	Free
23 May 2013	Diego Mainz	Granada	(Italy) Udinese	Loan return
23 May 2013	Diego Mainz	(Italy) Udinese	Granada	Free
23 May 2013	(Colombia) Cristián Zapata	(Italy) Milan	Villarreal	Loan return
23 May 2013	(Colombia) Cristián Zapata	Villarreal	(Italy) Milan	€6m
25 May 2013	(Algeria) Yacine Brahimi	Granada	(France) Rennes	Loan return
25 May 2013	(Algeria) Yacine Brahimi	(France) Rennes	Granada	€3.5m
26 May 2013	(Brazil) Neymar	(Brazil) Santos	Barcelona	€57m
28 May 2013	(Portugal) Ricardo Carvalho	Real Madrid	(France) Monaco	Free
31 May 2013	(Colombia) Radamel Falcao	Atlético Madrid	(France) Monaco	€60m
3 June 2013	Andrés Palop	Sevilla	(Germany) Bayer Leverkusen	Free
3 June 2013	(Brazil) Léo Baptistão	Rayo Vallecano	Atlético Madrid	€5m
3 June 2013	Dani Carvajal	(Germany) Bayer Leverkusen	Real Madrid	€6.5m
5 June 2013	Jordi Xumetra	Elche	Levante	Free
5 June 2013	(Argentina) Tino Costa	Valencia	(Russia) Spartak Moscow	€7m
5 June 2013	Adrián San Miguel	Real Betis	(England) West Ham United	Free
5 June 2013	Miguel de las Cuevas	Osasuna	Sporting Gijón	Loan return
5 June 2013	(Chile) Gato Silva	Osasuna	(Chile) Universidad Católica	Loan return
6 June 2013	José Cañas	Real Betis	(England) Swansea City	Free
7 June 2013	Borja Valle	Ourense	Ponferradina	Loan return
7 June 2013	Borja Valle	Ponferradina	Ourense	Free
7 June 2013	Dani Erencia	Girona	Sporting Gijón B	Free
9 June 2013	(Austria) Andreas Ivanschitz	(Germany) Mainz 05	Levante	Free
10 June 2013	(Democratic Republic of the Congo) Cedric Mabwati	Numancia	Real Betis	Free
10 June 2013	López Garai	Córdoba	Sporting Gijón	Free
10 June 2013	(Denmark) Stephan Andersen	(France) Evian	Real Betis	Free
10 June 2013	(Brazil) Casemiro	Real Madrid Castilla	(Brazil) São Paulo	Loan return
10 June 2013	(Brazil) Casemiro	(Brazil) São Paulo	Real Madrid	€6m
11 June 2013	(France) Jérémy Perbet	Villarreal	(Belgium) Mons	Loan return
11 June 2013	(France) Jérémy Perbet	(Belgium) Mons	Villarreal	€1.4m
12 June 2013	Roberto Lago	Celta Vigo	Getafe	Free
12 June 2013	(Portugal) Vitorino Antunes	Málaga	(Portugal) Paços de Ferreira	Loan return
12 June 2013	(Portugal) Vitorino Antunes	(Portugal) Paços de Ferreira	Málaga	€1.25m
12 June 2013	(Chile) Pedro Morales	Málaga	(Croatia) Dinamo Zagreb	Loan return
12 June 2013	(Chile) Pedro Morales	(Croatia) Dinamo Zagreb	Málaga	Free
12 June 2013	(Chile) Manuel Iturra	Málaga	Granada	Free
12 June 2013	Joaquín Sánchez	Málaga	(Italy) Fiorentina	€2m
13 June 2013	(Portugal) Flávio Ferreira	(Portugal) Académica de Coimbra	Málaga	€0.5m
13 June 2013	Edgar Hernández	Sant Andreu	Sabadell	Free
13 June 2013	(Chile) Lorenzo Reyes	(Chile) Huachipato	Real Betis	€0.75m
13 June 2013	Samuel de los Reyes	Sabadell	Córdoba	Free
13 June 2013	Juanfran	Real Madrid Castilla	Real Betis	Free
13 June 2013	Marcos Senna	Villarreal	(United States) New York Cosmos	Free
13 June 2013	(Romania) Raul Rusescu	(Romania) Steaua București	Sevilla	€2.2m
14 June 2013	Fede Vico	Córdoba	(Belgium) Anderlecht	€1.6m
14 June 2013	José Manuel Rueda	Xerez	Ponferradina	Free
15 June 2013	David López	Huesca	Espanyol	€0.25m
18 June 2013	(Morocco) Issam El Adoua	(Portugal) Vitória	Levante	Free
18 June 2013	Óscar Ramírez	Sabadell	Ponferradina	Free
18 June 2013	(Uruguay) Gustavo Munúa	Levante	(Italy) Fiorentina	Free
18 June 2013	(France) Jordan Lotiès	(France) Nancy	Osasuna	Free
18 June 2013	Alberto García	Córdoba	Sporting Gijón	Free
19 June 2013	Abraham González	Alcorcón	Espanyol	Free
19 June 2013	Chuli	Recreativo	Real Betis	€0.6m
19 June 2013	Juan Rafael Fuentes	Córdoba	Espanyol	Free
19 June 2013	Íñigo López	Granada	(Greece) PAOK	Free
20 June 2013	Piti	Rayo Vallecano	Granada	Free
20 June 2013	Míchel	Levante	Valencia	€0.42m
20 June 2013	(Croatia) Mate Bilić	Sporting Gijón	(Croatia) RNK Split	Free
20 June 2013	Raúl Cámara	Xerez	Tenerife	Free
20 June 2013	Andreu Fontàs	Mallorca	Barcelona	Loan return
20 June 2013	Andreu Fontàs	Barcelona	Celta Vigo	€0.75m
20 June 2013	Antonio Luna	Mallorca	Sevilla	Loan return
20 June 2013	Antonio Luna	Sevilla	(England) Aston Villa	€2m
21 June 2013	Javi Jiménez	Murcia	Levante	Free
21 June 2013	Máyor	Ponferradina	Las Palmas	Free
22 June 2013	Jairo	Racing Santander	Sevilla	€2.5m
22 June 2013	Luis Alberto	Barcelona B	Sevilla	Loan return
22 June 2013	Luis Alberto	Sevilla	(England) Liverpool	€8.5m
22 June 2013	(Belgium) Thibaut Courtois	Atlético Madrid	(England) Chelsea	Loan return
22 June 2013	(Belgium) Thibaut Courtois	(England) Chelsea	Atlético Madrid	Loan
22 June 2013	Riki	Deportivo La Coruña	Granada	Free
22 June 2013	José María Cases	Alcoyano	Granada	Loan return
22 June 2013	José María Cases	Granada	(Greece) Panathinaikos	Free
23 June 2013	Benja	Girona	Córdoba	Free
23 June 2013	Iago Aspas	Celta Vigo	(England) Liverpool	€9.5m
24 June 2013	Jorge Larena	Huesca	Recreativo	Free
24 June 2013	Joan Verdú	Espanyol	Real Betis	Free
24 June 2013	(Angola) Jorge Araújo	(Angola) Primeiro de Agosto	Recreativo	Free
26 June 2013	Beñat Etxebarria	Real Betis	Athletic Bilbao	€8m
26 June 2013	(Morocco) Zakarya Bergdich	(France) Lens	Valladolid	Free
26 June 2013	(Colombia) Bernardo Espinosa	Sporting Gijón	Sevilla	Loan return
26 June 2013	(Colombia) Bernardo Espinosa	Sevilla	Sporting Gijón	Free
26 June 2013	David Barral	(Turkey) Orduspor	Levante	Free
26 June 2013	Dani Abalo	Celta Vigo	(Bulgaria) Ludogorets Razgrad	Free
26 June 2013	Jesús Berrocal	Recreativo	(Thailand) Buriram United	Free
27 June 2013	Raúl Baena	Espanyol	Rayo Vallecano	Free
27 June 2013	(Japan) Sotan Tanabe	(Japan) FC Tokyo	Sabadell	Free
27 June 2013	(Colombia) Gilberto García	(Colombia) Once Caldas	Valladolid	Loan
27 June 2013	(Brazil) Charles	Almería	Celta Vigo	€1m
27 June 2013	Isco	Málaga	Real Madrid	€24m
27 June 2013	Jordi Amat	Rayo Vallecano	Espanyol	Loan return
27 June 2013	Jordi Amat	Espanyol	(England) Swansea City	€2.5m
27 June 2013	Carlos Ruiz	Ponferradina	Tenerife	Free
27 June 2013	Mikel Iribas	Mirandés	Alcorcón	Free
28 June 2013	Mikel Balenziaga	Valladolid	Athletic Bilbao	€0.3m
28 June 2013	(Portugal) Beto	Sevilla	(Portugal) Braga	Loan return
28 June 2013	(Portugal) Beto	(Portugal) Braga	Sevilla	€1m
28 June 2013	Óscar Rico	Cartagena	Tenerife	Free
28 June 2013	Ismael Bolívar	Guijuelo	Córdoba	Loan return
28 June 2013	Ismael Bolívar	Córdoba	Lucena	Free
28 June 2013	(Argentina) Sebastián Dubarbier	Córdoba	Almería	Free
28 June 2013	(Bosnia and Herzegovina) Emir Spahić	(Russia) Anzhi Makhachkala	Sevilla	Loan return
28 June 2013	(Bosnia and Herzegovina) Emir Spahić	Sevilla	(Germany) Bayer Leverkusen	€1.5m
28 June 2013	Marquitos	Xerez	Ponferradina	Free
28 June 2013	(Germany) Marko Marin	(England) Chelsea	Sevilla	Loan
28 June 2013	Vitolo	Las Palmas	Sevilla	€3m
28 June 2013	Óscar Díaz	Lugo	Almería	Free
29 June 2013	(Canada) Jonathan de Guzmán	(England) Swansea City	Villarreal	Loan return
29 June 2013	(Canada) Jonathan de Guzmán	Villarreal	(England) Swansea City	Loan
29 June 2013	(Romania) Gabriel Torje	Granada	(Italy) Udinese	Loan return
29 June 2013	Aitor Sanz	Oviedo	Tenerife	Free
29 June 2013	Héctor Verdés	Elche	Alcorcón	Free
29 June 2013	(Paraguay) Carlos Acuña	Girona	(Italy) Udinese	Free
29 June 2013	Jordi Matamala	Recreativo	Girona	Free
30 June 2013	Álvaro Antón	Guadalajara	Recreativo	Free
30 June 2013	(Brazil) Michel Macedo	(Brazil) Atlético Mineiro	Almería	Loan return
30 June 2013	(Argentina) Hernán Bernardello	(Argentina) Atlético Colón	Almería	Loan return
30 June 2013	(Uruguay) Adrián Gunino	Almería	(Uruguay) Centro Atlético Fénix	Loan return
30 June 2013	Miguel Pallardó	Almería	Levante	Loan return
30 June 2013	Iago Falqué	Almería	(England) Tottenham Hotspur	Loan return
30 June 2013	Iago Herrerín	Numancia	Athletic Bilbao	Loan return
30 June 2013	Iban Zubiaurre	Salamanca	Athletic Bilbao	Loan return
30 June 2013	Gorka Eraña	Barakaldo	Athletic Bilbao	Loan return
30 June 2013	Mikel Orbegozo	Sestao River Club	Athletic Bilbao	Loan return
30 June 2013	(Portugal) Pizzi	Deportivo La Coruña	Atlético Madrid	Loan return
30 June 2013	(Portugal) Rúben Micael	(Portugal) Braga	Atlético Madrid	Loan return
30 June 2013	Rubén Pérez	Real Betis	Atlético Madrid	Loan return
30 June 2013	(Uruguay) Leandro Cabrera	Hércules	Atlético Madrid	Loan return
30 June 2013	(Portugal) Sílvio	Deportivo La Coruña	Atlético Madrid	Loan return
30 June 2013	Joel Robles	(England) Wigan Athletic	Atlético Madrid	Loan return
30 June 2013	Borja González	Huesca	Atlético Madrid	Loan return
30 June 2013	Pedro Martín	Numancia	Atlético Madrid	Loan return
30 June 2013	(Netherlands) Ibrahim Afellay	(Germany) Schalke 04	Barcelona	Loan return
30 June 2013	Bojan Krkić	(Italy) Roma	Barcelona	Loan return
30 June 2013	Manolo González	Atlético Sanluqueño	Real Betis	Loan return
30 June 2013	Jonathan Pereira	Villarreal	Real Betis	Loan return
30 June 2013	(Portugal) Salvador Agra	(Italy) Siena	Real Betis	Loan return
30 June 2013	Ezequiel Calvente	(Germany) SC Freiburg	Real Betis	Loan return
30 June 2013	Javier Matilla	Murcia	Real Betis	Loan return
30 June 2013	(Costa Rica) Joel Campbell	(England) Arsenal	Real Betis	Loan return
30 June 2013	(Sweden) Guillermo Molins	Real Betis	(Belgium) Anderlecht	Loan return
30 June 2013	(Colombia) Dorlan Pabón	Real Betis	(Italy) Parma	Loan return
30 June 2013	Yoel Rodríguez	Lugo	Celta Vigo	Loan return
30 June 2013	Nolito	Granada	(Portugal) Benfica	Loan return
30 June 2013	David Rodríguez	Sporting Gijón	Celta Vigo	Loan return
30 June 2013	Cristian Bustos	Sporting Gijón	Celta Vigo	Loan return
30 June 2013	Jota Peleteiro	Real Madrid Castilla	Celta Vigo	Loan return
30 June 2013	Javi Varas	Celta Vigo	Sevilla	Loan return
30 June 2013	(South Korea) Park Chu-Young	Celta Vigo	(England) Arsenal	Loan return
30 June 2013	(Croatia) Danijel Pranjić	Celta Vigo	(Portugal) Sporting CP	Loan return
30 June 2013	(Norway) Vadim Demidov	Celta Vigo	(Germany) Eintracht Frankfurt	Loan return
30 June 2013	Ángel Rodríguez	Elche	Levante	Loan return
30 June 2013	(Uruguay) Adrián Luna	(Uruguay) Nacional	Espanyol	Loan return
30 June 2013	(Republic of the Congo) Thievy Bifouma	Las Palmas	Espanyol	Loan return
30 June 2013	(Italy) Samuele Longo	Espanyol	(Italy) Inter Milan	Loan return
30 June 2013	(Uruguay) Juan Ángel Albín	(Uruguay) Nacional	Espanyol	Loan return
30 June 2013	Dani Güiza	(Malaysia) Darul Takzim	Getafe	Loan return
30 June 2013	Álex Pérez	Huesca	Getafe	Loan return
30 June 2013	Pedro Mosquera	Real Madrid Castilla	Getafe	Loan return
30 June 2013	Álvaro Arroyo	Alcorcón	Getafe	Loan return
30 June 2013	(Venezuela) Miku	(Scotland) Celtic	Getafe	Loan return
30 June 2013	Paco Alcácer	Getafe	Valencia	Loan return
30 June 2013	Alexis	Getafe	Sevilla	Loan return
30 June 2013	Sergio Escudero	Getafe	(Germany) Schalke 04	Loan return
30 June 2013	(Argentina) Fede Fernández	Getafe	(Italy) Napoli	Loan return
30 June 2013	(Cape Verde) Valdo	Levante	(Mexico) Atlante	Loan return
30 June 2013	(Italy) Robert Acquafresca	Levante	(Italy) Bologna	Loan return
30 June 2013	Óscar Pérez	Racing Santander	Granada	Loan return
30 June 2013	(Cameroon) Allan Nyom	Granada	(Italy) Udinese	Loan return
30 June 2012	(Chile) Matías Campos	(Italy) Siena	Granada	Loan return
30 June 2013	Recio	Granada	Málaga	Loan return
30 June 2013	Nolito	Granada	(Portugal) Benfica	Loan return
30 June 2013	(Nigeria) Odion Ighalo	Granada	(Italy) Udinese	Loan return
30 June 2013	Dani Benítez	Granada	(Italy) Udinese	Loan return
30 June 2013	Héctor Yuste	Racing Santander	Granada	Loan return
30 June 2013	David Ferreiro	Racing Santander	Granada	Loan return
30 June 2013	Álex Cruz	UCAM Murcia	Granada	Loan return
30 June 2013	(Nigeria) Kabiru Akinsola	(Cyprus) Doxa Katokopias	Granada	Loan return
30 June 2013	(Brazil) Allan Marques	(Italy) Udinese	Granada	Loan return
30 June 2013	(Scotland) Ikechi Anya	(England) Watford	Granada	Loan return
30 June 2013	(Czech Republic) Daniel Pudil	(England) Watford	Granada	Loan return
30 June 2013	Álex Bernal	Leganés	Granada	Loan return
30 June 2013	David de Coz	Lugo	Granada	Loan return
30 June 2013	Toti	Hércules	Granada	Loan return
30 June 2013	(Ghana) Richard Boateng	San Roque de Lepe	Granada	Loan return
30 June 2013	(Ghana) Jacob Akrong	San Roque de Lepe	Granada	Loan return
30 June 2013	(Ghana) Mohammed Fatau	San Roque de Lepe	Granada	Loan return
30 June 2013	(Colombia) Wilson Cuero	San Roque de Lepe	Granada	Loan return
30 June 2013	(Colombia) Jeison Murillo	Las Palmas	Granada	Loan return
30 June 2013	(Venezuela) Darwin Machís	(Portugal) Vitória	Granada	Loan return
30 June 2013	Jona	(Portugal) Vitória	Granada	Loan return
30 June 2013	(Brazil) Naldo	(Italy) Bologna	Granada	Loan return
30 June 2013	Jaime Romero	(Turkey) Orduspor	Granada	Loan return
30 June 2013	(Brazil) Sandro Silva	(Brazil) Vasco da Gama	Málaga	Loan return
30 June 2013	Rubén Martínez	Rayo Vallecano	Málaga	Loan return
30 June 2013	Juanmi Jiménez	Racing Santander	Málaga	Loan return
30 June 2013	(Brazil) Lucas Piazón	Málaga	(England) Chelsea	Loan return
30 June 2013	(Paraguay) Roque Santa Cruz	Málaga	(England) Manchester City	Loan return
30 June 2013	(United States) Oguchi Onyewu	Málaga	(Portugal) Sporting CP	Loan return
30 June 2013	(Uruguay) Diego Lugano	Málaga	(France) Paris Saint-Germain	Loan return
30 June 2013	Eneko Satrústegui	Numancia	Osasuna	Loan return
30 June 2013	Xavi Annunziata	Huesca	Osasuna	Loan return
30 June 2013	Nacho Zabal	Huesca	Osasuna	Loan return
30 June 2013	Ion Echaide	Huesca	Osasuna	Loan return
30 June 2013	Rúper	Mirandés	Osasuna	Loan return
30 June 2013	Joseba Llorente	Osasuna	Real Sociedad	Loan return
30 June 2013	(Ghana) Anthony Annan	Osasuna	(Germany) Schalke 04	Loan return
30 June 2013	(Ghana) Michael Essien	Real Madrid	(England) Chelsea	Loan return
30 June 2013	Rafa García	Xerez	Rayo Vallecano	Loan return
30 June 2013	(Argentina) Franco Vázquez	Rayo Vallecano	(Italy) Palermo	Loan return
30 June 2013	Jordi Figueras	Rayo Vallecano	(Belgium) Club Brugge	Loan return
30 June 2013	Dani García	Eibar	Real Sociedad	Loan return
30 June 2013	Yuri Berchiche	Eibar	Real Sociedad	Loan return
30 June 2013	José Ángel Valdés	Real Sociedad	(Italy) Roma	Loan return
30 June 2013	(Italy) Tiberio Guarente	(Italy) Bologna	Sevilla	Loan return
30 June 2013	(Japan) Hiroshi Ibusuki	(Belgium) Eupen	Sevilla	Loan return
30 June 2013	Carles Gil	Elche	Valencia	Loan return
30 June 2013	(Argentina) Fernando Gago	(Argentina) Vélez Sársfield	Valencia	Loan return
30 June 2013	Carlos Lázaro	Huesca	Valladolid	Loan return
30 June 2013	Quique González	Guijuelo	Valladolid	Loan return
30 June 2013	(Argentina) Juan Neira	Valladolid	(Argentina) Gimnasia	Loan return
30 June 2013	Omar Ramos	Valladolid	Huesca	Loan return
30 June 2013	(Portugal) Henrique Sereno	Valladolid	(Portugal) Porto	Loan return
30 June 2013	Joselu (born 1991)	Córdoba	Villarreal	Loan return
30 June 2013	Javier Camuñas	Deportivo La Coruña	Villarreal	Loan return
30 June 2013	(France) Florian Lejeune	(France) Brest	Villarreal	Loan return
30 June 2013	Toño García	Sabadell	Villarreal	Loan return
30 June 2013	Gerard Bordas	Girona	Villarreal	Loan return
30 June 2013	(Argentina) Héctor Canteros	Villarreal	(Argentina) Vélez Sársfield	Loan return
30 June 2013	Asier Barahona	Alavés	Mirandés	Loan return
30 June 2013	Sergio Ayala	Alavés	Barcelona B	Loan return
30 June 2013	Quini	Racing Santander	Alcorcón	Loan return
30 June 2013	Víctor Laguardia	Alcorcón	Zaragoza	Loan return
30 June 2013	Sergi Enrich	Alcorcón	Mallorca	Loan return
30 June 2013	(Argentina) Sergio Araujo	Barcelona B	(Argentina) Boca Juniors	Loan return
30 June 2013	Rodri Ríos	Zaragoza	Barcelona B	Loan return
30 June 2013	Miguel Ángel Sáinz	Real Betis B	Barcelona B	Loan return
30 June 2013	Jordi Quintillà	Badalona	Barcelona B	Loan return
30 June 2013	Antonio Martínez	Mirandés	Real Madrid Castilla	Loan return
30 June 2013	(Brazil) Fabinho	Real Madrid Castilla	(Portugal) Rio Ave	Loan return
30 June 2013	(Portugal) Afonso Taira	Atlético Clube de Portugal	Córdoba	Loan return
30 June 2013	Jaime Astrain	Écija	Cordoba	Loan return
30 June 2013	(France) John Ayina	Écija	Córdoba	Loan return
30 June 2013	(Argentina) Damián Petkoff	Jaén	Córdoba	Loan return
30 June 2013	(Italy) Vincenzo Rennella	Córdoba	(Italy) Genoa	Loan return
30 June 2013	Diego Seoane	Córdoba	Deportivo La Coruña	Loan return
30 June 2013	Felipe Ramos	Valencia Mestalla	Deportivo La Coruña	Loan return
30 June 2013	David Rochela	(Israel) Hapoel Tel Aviv	Deportivo La Coruña	Loan return
30 June 2013	Juan Carlos Real	Huesca	Deportivo La Coruña	Loan return
30 June 2013	(Serbia) Stefan Deák	(Hungary) BFC Siófok	Deportivo La Coruña	Loan return
30 June 2013	(Portugal) André Santos	Deportivo La Coruña	(Portugal) Sporting CP	Loan return
30 June 2013	(Brazil) Evaldo	Deportivo La Coruña	(Portugal) Sporting CP	Loan return
30 June 2013	(Portugal) Diogo Salomão	Deportivo La Coruña	(Portugal) Sporting CP	Loan return
30 June 2013	(Portugal) Nélson Oliveira	Deportivo La Coruña	(Portugal) Benfica	Loan return
30 June 2013	(Brazil) Kaká	Deportivo La Coruña	(Hungary) Videoton	Loan return
30 June 2013	(Colombia) Abel Aguilar	Deportivo La Coruña	Hércules	Loan return
30 June 2013	Marc Serramitja	Sant Andreu	Girona	Loan return
30 June 2013	Albert Quintana	Santboià	Girona	Loan return
30 June 2013	(Belgium) Ritchie Kitoko	Girona	(Italy) Udinese	Loan return
30 June 2013	Raúl González	Orihuela	Hércules	Loan return
30 June 2013	Pere Martínez	Atlético Madrid B	Hércules	Loan return
30 June 2013	(Colombia) John Edison Mosquera	Alcoyano	Hércules	Loan return
30 June 2013	(Argentina) Mario Paglialunga	Hércules	(Italy) Catania	Loan return
30 June 2013	Roque Mesa	Atlético Baleares	Las Palmas	Loan return
30 June 2013	Sergio Suárez	Mirandés	Las Palmas	Loan return
30 June 2013	Borja Vera	San Roque de Lepe	Las Palmas	Loan return
30 June 2013	(Belgium) Marvin Ogunjimi	(Belgium) Beerschot AC	Mallorca	Loan return
30 June 2013	(Netherlands) Gianni Zuiverloon	(Netherlands) Heerenveen	Mallorca	Loan return
30 June 2013	(Japan) Akihiro Ienaga	(Japan) Gamba Osaka	Mallorca	Loan return
30 June 2013	(Brazil) Anderson Conceição	Mallorca	(Brazil) Figueirense	Loan return
30 June 2013	(Brazil) Pedro Geromel	Mallorca	(Germany) 1. FC Köln	Loan return
30 June 2013	(Scotland) Alan Hutton	Mallorca	(England) Aston Villa	Loan return
30 June 2013	(Argentina) Fernando Tissone	Mallorca	(Italy) Sampdoria	Loan return
30 June 2013	(Argentina) Pablo Vivancos	Olímpic de Xàtiva	Murcia	Loan return
30 June 2013	Samuel López	Coruxo	Murcia	Loan return
30 June 2013	(Argentina) Jonathan Gómez	Murcia	(Argentina) Banfield	Loan return
30 June 2013	(Argentina) Nicolás Tagliafico	Murcia	(Argentina) Banfield	Loan return
30 June 2013	Javier Gallardo	Tudelano	Numancia	Loan return
30 June 2013	Víctor Andrés	Salamanca	Numancia	Loan return
30 June 2013	(Brazil) Wellington Silva	Ponferradina	(England) Arsenal	Loan return
30 June 2013	Manuel Bonaque	Villarreal B	Recreativo	Loan return
30 June 2013	Aitor García	Celta Vigo B	Recreativo	Loan return
30 June 2013	(Uruguay) Mathias Saavedra	San Roque de Lepe	Recreativo	Loan return
30 June 2013	Álvaro Vega	San Roque de Lepe	Recreativo	Loan return
30 June 2013	(Uruguay) Diego Riolfo	Recreativo	(Uruguay) Montevideo Wanderers	Loan return
30 June 2013	(Mexico) Ulises Dávila	Sabadell	(England) Chelsea	Loan return
30 June 2013	Lucas Porcar	Xerez	Zaragoza	Loan return
30 June 2013	Luis García	(Mexico) UANL	Zaragoza	Loan return
30 June 2013	(Cameroon) Henri Bienvenu	Zaragoza	(Turkey) Fenerbahçe	Loan return
30 June 2013	Rubén Rochina	Zaragoza	(England) Blackburn Rovers	Loan return
30 June 2013	Adrià Carmona	Zaragoza	(Italy) Milan	Loan return
30 June 2013	(Argentina) Lucas Wilchez	Zaragoza	(Chile) Colo-Colo	Loan return
30 June 2013	(Brazil) Michel Macedo	Almería	(Brazil) Atlético Mineiro	Loan
1 July 2013	Xabi Etxeita	Elche	Athletic Bilbao	Free
1 July 2013	(Argentina) Eial Strahman	(Mexico) Guadalajara	Córdoba	Free
1 July 2013	Hugo Fraile	Getafe	Sporting Gijón	Free
1 July 2013	Javi Fuego	Rayo Vallecano	Valencia	Free
1 July 2013	Nolito	(Portugal) Benfica	Celta Vigo	€2.6m
1 July 2013	Joan Oriol	Villarreal	Osasuna	Free
2 July 2013	Iñaki Goitia	Mirandés	Alavés	Free
2 July 2013	Joselu (born August 1990)	Almería B	Córdoba	Free
2 July 2013	Alejandro Pozuelo	Real Betis	(England) Swansea City	€0.5m
2 July 2013	Marc Muniesa	Barcelona	(England) Stoke City	Free
2 July 2013	(Argentina) Chori Domínguez	Rayo Vallecano	(Greece) Olympiacos	Free
3 July 2013	Ezequiel Calvente	Real Betis	Recreativo	Loan
3 July 2013	Juan Carlos Martín	Hércules	Córdoba	Free
3 July 2013	(Uruguay) Hernán Menosse	(Uruguay) Montevideo Wanderers	Recreativo	Free
3 July 2013	Kike Sola	Osasuna	Athletic Bilbao	€4m
3 July 2013	Unai Medina	Barakaldo	Alavés	Free
3 July 2013	Mané	Getafe	(Israel) Maccabi Tel Aviv	Free
3 July 2013	Iván Malón	Numancia	Mirandés	Free
4 July 2013	Ion Vélez	Girona	Alavés	Free
4 July 2013	Igor Martínez	Athletic Bilbao	Mirandés	Free
4 July 2013	(Argentina) Nico Pareja	(Russia) Spartak Moscow	Sevilla	Loan
4 July 2013	José Ángel Valdés	(Italy) Roma	Real Sociedad	Loan
4 July 2013	(Ivory Coast) Bobley Anderson	(Morocco) Wydad Casablanca	Málaga	Free
4 July 2013	(Slovenia) Bojan Jokić	(Italy) Chievo	Villarreal	Free
5 July 2013	Diego García	Almería	Ponferradina	Free
5 July 2013	Alex Moreno	UE Llagostera	Mallorca	Free
5 July 2013	Tomás Pina	Mallorca	Villarreal	€4m
5 July 2013	Juanjo Expósito	Numancia	Ponferradina	Free
5 July 2013	Joselu (born 1991)	Villarreal	Recreativo	Free
5 July 2013	Toño	Granada	Elche	Free
5 July 2013	(Israel) Gai Assulin	Racing Santander	Granada	Free
5 July 2013	Diego Mariño	Villarreal	Valladolid	Free
5 July 2013	Dani Mallo	Girona	Lugo	Free
5 July 2013	Oriol Riera	Alcorcón	Osasuna	Free
5 July 2013	Marc Pedraza	L'Hospitalet	Numancia	Free
5 July 2013	David Mainz	Eibar	(Bolivia) Club Jorge Wilstermann	Free
5 July 2013	(Colombia) Johan Mójica	(Colombia) Deportivo Cali	Rayo Vallecano	Loan
5 July 2013	(Argentina) Guillermo Sara	(Argentina) Atlético Rafaela	Real Betis	€0.8m
5 July 2013	(France) Florian Lejeune	Villarreal	(France) Stade Brest	Loan
5 July 2013	Francisco Aday	L'Hospitalet	Tenerife	Free
5 July 2013	Manu del Moral	Sevilla	Elche	Loan
5 July 2013	(Bosnia and Herzegovina) Miroslav Stevanović	Sevilla	Elche	Loan
5 July 2013	Txema Pan	Alavés B	Mirandés	Free
5 July 2013	Txomin Nagore	Numancia	Mirandés	Free
5 July 2013	Iago Bouzón	Xerez	Córdoba	Free
5 July 2013	José Antonio Ríos	Real Madrid Castilla	Mirandés	Free
6 July 2013	Bojan Krkić	Barcelona	(Netherlands) Ajax	Loan
6 July 2013	Miguel Palanca	Elche	Numancia	Free
6 July 2013	José Javier Barkero	Levante	Zaragoza	Free
6 July 2013	David Cortés	Hércules	Zaragoza	Free
6 July 2013	(Morocco) Abdel Barrada	Getafe	(United Arab Emirates) Al Jazira	€10m
6 July 2013	(Argentina) Fernando Tissone	(Italy) Sampdoria	Málaga	Free
6 July 2013	Álvaro García	San Fernando	Granada	Free
6 July 2013	(Portugal) Sérgio Pinto	(Germany) Hannover 96	Levante	Free
6 July 2013	(France) Jérémy Toulalan	Málaga	(France) Monaco	€5m
7 July 2013	(Serbia) Aleksandar Pantić	(Serbia) Red Star Belgrade	Villarreal	Free
7 July 2013	(Argentina) Cristian Álvarez	Espanyol	(Argentina) San Lorenzo	Free
8 July 2013	(France) Eric Abidal	Barcelona	(France) Monaco	Free
8 July 2013	Gerard Moreno	Villarreal	Mallorca	Loan
8 July 2013	David Villa	Barcelona	Atlético Madrid	€5.1m
8 July 2013	David Lombán	Barcelona B	Elche	Free
8 July 2013	Miguel Linares	Elche	Recreativo	Free
9 July 2013	(Netherlands) Jens Janse	(Netherlands) NAC Breda	Córdoba	Free
9 July 2013	(Argentina) Mauro Quiroga	Lugo	Alavés	Free
9 July 2013	José Callejón	Real Madrid	(Italy) Napoli	€10m
9 July 2013	(Portugal) Sílvio	Atlético Madrid	(Portugal) Benfica	Loan
9 July 2013	Juanma Delgado	Alavés	(Greece) Asteras Tripolis	Free
9 July 2013	Joel Robles	Atlético Madrid	(England) Everton	€5m
9 July 2013	Álex Cruz	Avilés	Jaén	Free
9 July 2013	Jozabed Sánchez	Ponferradina	Jaén	Free
9 July 2013	Víctor Curto	Albacete	Jaén	Free
9 July 2013	(Mexico) Giovani dos Santos	Mallorca	Villarreal	€6m
9 July 2013	(Sweden) Olof Mellberg	Villarreal	(Denmark) Copenhagen	Free
9 July 2013	Javi Flaño	Elche	Mirandés	Free
9 July 2013	Cristian Bustos	Celta Vigo	Sporting Gijón	Loan
9 July 2013	(Colombia) Carlos Bacca	(Belgium) Club Brugge	Sevilla	€7m
10 July 2013	(Mexico) Nery Castillo	(Mexico) Pachuca	Rayo Vallecano	Free
10 July 2013	(Brazil) Kaká	(Hungary) Videoton	Deportivo La Coruña	Free
10 July 2013	Adrián Ortolá	Villarreal B	Barcelona B	Free
10 July 2013	Agus	(Turkey) Orduspor	Mallorca	Free
10 July 2013	Carles Gil	Valencia	Elche	Loan
10 July 2013	Gorka Kijera	Real Unión	Eibar	Free
10 July 2013	Gerard Deulofeu	Barcelona	(England) Everton	Loan
10 July 2013	Xabi Castillo	Athletic Bilbao	Las Palmas	Free
10 July 2013	(Argentina) Guillermo Sara	(Argentina) Atlético Rafaela	Real Betis	Loan
10 July 2013	(Argentina) Mario Paglialunga	(Italy) Catania	Zaragoza	Free
10 July 2013	Raúl Fernández	Athletic Bilbao	Numancia	Loan
10 July 2013	Juan Carlos Pérez	(Portugal) Braga	Real Betis	Loan
10 July 2013	(Portugal) Salvador Agra	Real Betis	(Portugal) Braga	Loan
10 July 2013	Alberto Aguilar	Córdoba	Ponferradina	Free
11 July 2013	(Paraguay) Roque Santa Cruz	(England) Manchester City	Málaga	Free
11 July 2013	(Argentina) Martín Demichelis	Málaga	Atlético Madrid	Free
11 July 2013	(Switzerland) Haris Seferovic	(Italy) Fiorentina	Real Sociedad	€3m
11 July 2013	Sergio Escudero	(Germany) FC Schalke 04	Getafe	€0.5m
11 July 2013	Hugo Álvarez	Cartagena	Jaén	Free
11 July 2013	Rodri Ríos	Barcelona B	Almería	Loan
11 July 2013	(Brazil) Rafinha	Barcelona	Celta Vigo	Loan
11 July 2013	(Equatorial Guinea) Carlos Akapo	Huracán Valencia	Numancia	Free
11 July 2013	(France) Mickaël Gaffoor	Guadalajara	Numancia	Free
12 July 2013	Oriol Romeu	(England) Chelsea	Valencia	Loan
11 July 2013	Dani Nieto	Alcorcón	Barcelona B	Free
11 July 2013	Miguel Martínez	Alavés	Logroñés	Free
11 July 2013	(Argentina) Damián Petkoff	Córdoba	Jaén	Loan
11 July 2013	(Portugal) Gustavo Ledes	Barcelona B	(Portugal) Rio Ave	Free
11 July 2013	Javi Venta	Villarreal	(England) Brentford	Free
11 July 2013	Jonan García	Alavés	(Greece) AEL Kalloni	Free
11 July 2013	Cristian García	Córdoba	Sabadell	Free
12 July 2013	Javito Peral	Hércules	Alcorcón	Free
12 July 2013	(Brazil) Douglas dos Santos	(Brazil) Náutico	Granada	Free
12 July 2013	Asier Illarramendi	Real Sociedad	Real Madrid	€32.2m
12 July 2013	Juan Calatayud	Mallorca	(Hungary) Videoton	Free
12 July 2013	(Ghana) Thomas Teye Partey	Atlético Madrid B	Mallorca	Loan
12 July 2013	Suso	(England) Liverpool	Almería	Loan
12 July 2013	(Argentina) Cata Díaz	Atlético Madrid	(Argentina) Boca Juniors	Free
12 July 2013	Pere Martínez	Hércules	Espanyol B	Free
12 July 2013	Juanje Torrejón	Alavés	San Fernando	Free
12 July 2013	Pedro Martín	Atlético Madrid	Numancia	Loan
12 July 2013	Jonathan Pereira	Real Betis	Villarreal	€1.5m
13 July 2013	(Ivory Coast) Lago Júnior	Numancia	Gimnàstic de Tarragona	Free
13 July 2013	Eneko Fernández	Sabadell	Oviedo	Free
13 July 2013	(Argentina) Lautaro Acosta	Sevilla	(Argentina) Club Atlético Lanús	Free
14 July 2013	(Peru) Andy Pando	Las Palmas	(Peru) César Vallejo	Free
14 July 2013	Toni Moral	Girona	(Greece) Plaranias	Free
14 July 2013	Manolo Martínez	Recreativo	(Greece) Levadiakos	Free
14 July 2013	Juan Carlos Valerón	Deportivo La Coruña	Las Palmas	Free
14 July 2013	(France) Alexandre Coeff	(Italy) Udinese	Granada	Loan
14 July 2013	Borja Docal	Racing Santander	Mirandés	Free
14 July 2013	Thiago Alcântara	Barcelona	(Germany) Bayern Munich	€25m
14 July 2013	(Belgium) Marvin Ogunjimi	Mallorca	(Belgium) Oud-Heverlee Leuven	Loan
14 July 2013	Héctor Font	Lugo	Hércules	Free
15 July 2013	Julen Castañeda	Real Sociedad B	Ponferradina	Free
15 July 2013	José Campaña	Sevilla	(England) Crystal Palace	€2m
15 July 2013	Juan Hernández	Granada	La Hoya Lorca	Loan
15 July 2013	Quique Rivero	Racing Santander	Tenerife	Free
15 July 2013	Carlos Expósito	Alcorcón	Levante B	Free
15 July 2013	Nacho Zabal	Osasuna	Huesca	Free
15 July 2013	(Portugal) Daniel Carriço	(England) Reading	Sevilla	Loan
15 July 2013	(Germany) Markus Steinhöfer	(Switzerland) Basel	Real Betis	Free
16 July 2013	Luso Delgado	Girona	Córdoba	Free
16 July 2013	Álvaro Peña	Athletic Bilbao B	Lugo	Free
16 July 2013	Jorge García	Murcia	Lugo	Free
16 July 2013	Pedro Bolaños	Jaén	Melilla	Free
16 July 2013	Migue Montes	Jaén	Melilla	Free
16 July 2013	Álvaro Lozano	Jaén	Villacarrillo	Free
16 July 2013	Elady	Jaén	Villacarrillo	Free
16 July 2013	Juan Serrano	Jaén	Atlético Mancha Real	Loan
16 July 2013	Pedrito	Jaén	Atlético Mancha Real	Loan
16 July 2013	David Timor	Osasuna	Girona	Loan
16 July 2013	Rubén Pérez	Atlético Madrid	Elche	Loan
16 July 2013	Ángel López	Real Betis	Las Palmas	Free
16 July 2013	Tete	Albacete	Murcia	Free
16 July 2013	(Argentina) Ruso García	Murcia	(Argentina) Godoy Cruz	Free
16 July 2013	Juan Pablo Colinas	Sporting Gijón	(Israel) Maccabi Tel Aviv	Free
17 July 2013	(Brazil) Iriney	Granada	(England) Watford	Loan
17 July 2013	(Czech Republic) Daniel Pudil	Granada	(England) Watford	Free
17 July 2013	Dioni	(Italy) Udinese	Hércules	Loan
17 July 2013	(Chile) Matías Campos	(Italy) Udinese	Hércules	Loan
17 July 2013	(Nigeria) Kabiru Akinsola	Granada	L'Hospitalet	Free
17 July 2013	Javi Hernández	Alavés	Oviedo	Free
17 July 2013	Chando	(Cyprus) AEK Larnaca	Girona	Free
17 July 2013	Álvaro Negredo	Sevilla	(England) Manchester City	€25m
17 July 2013	(Serbia) Stefan Šćepović	(Serbia) Partizan	Sporting Gijón	Loan
17 July 2013	Pedro Alcalá	Almería B	Murcia	Free
17 July 2013	Bingen Erdozia	Eibar	Sestao River	Free
18 July 2013	(Argentina) Óscar Ustari	(Argentina) Boca Juniors	Almería	Free
18 July 2013	Jorge Pulido	Atlético Madrid	Real Madrid Castilla	Free
18 July 2013	Javi Lara	Alcoyano	Ponferradina	Free
18 July 2013	Javi Rey	Lugo	Celta Vigo B	Free
18 July 2013	Leandro Montagud	Ponferradina	Levante B	Free
18 July 2013	Gorka Azkorra	Guadalajara	Hércules	Free
18 July 2013	Chumbi	Almería	Valencia Mestalla	Free
18 July 2013	(Argentina) Gastón Sangoy	Sporting Gijón	(Cyprus) Apollon Limassol	Free
18 July 2013	Fran Dorronsoro	Alcorcón	Albacete	Free
18 July 2013	Dani Giménez	Rayo Vallecano	Alcorcón	Free
18 July 2013	Rayco García	Mirandés	Alcoyano	Free
18 July 2013	(Argentina) Óscar Trejo	Sporting Gijón	(France) Toulouse	€2.1m
18 July 2013	Francisco Sandaza	(Scotland) Rangers	Lugo	Free
18 July 2013	Ismael López	Athletic Bilbao	Sporting Gijón	Free
18 July 2013	(Portugal) Diogo Figueiras	(Portugal) Paços de Ferreira	Sevilla	€1.5m
18 July 2013	Rayco García	Mirandés	Alcoyano	Free
18 July 2013	Nano	Ponferradina	(Greece) Panathinaikos	Free
18 July 2013	(Japan) Hiroshi Ibusuki	Sevilla	Valencia Mestalla	Free
19 July 2013	(Paraguay) Nelson Haedo Valdez	Valencia	(United Arab Emirates) Al Jazira	€3m
19 July 2013	Omar Ramos	Huesca	Valladolid	€0.2m
19 July 2013	Iván López	Levante	Girona	Loan
19 July 2013	Lillo	Alcoyano	Eibar	Free
19 July 2013	Vicente Pérez	Guadalajara	Numancia	Free
19 July 2013	Manu	Jaén	Lucena	Loan
19 July 2013	Nano	Osasuna	Alavés	Free
19 July 2013	Ernesto Gómez	Recreativo	Lugo	Free
19 July 2013	Raúl Albentosa	Cádiz	Eibar	Free
19 July 2013	Sergio Rodríguez	Tenerife	Lucena	Free
19 July 2013	Ruben Negredo	Alavés	Reus Deportiu	Free
20 July 2013	(Argentina) Juan Forlín	Espanyol	(Qatar) Al Rayyan	€2.5m
20 July 2013	Alain Arroyo	Mirandés	Oviedo	Free
20 July 2013	Fito	Sabadell	Huesca	Free
21 July 2013	Raúl Albiol	Real Madrid	(Italy) Napoli	€12m
21 July 2013	Edu Campabadal	(England) Wigan Athletic	Córdoba	Free
21 July 2013	Iván Balliu	Barcelona B	(Portugal) Arouca	Free
22 July 2013	(Democratic Republic of the Congo) Ritchie Kitoko	(Italy) Udinese	Jaén	Loan
22 July 2013	Saúl Ñíguez	Atlético Madrid	Rayo Vallecano	Loan
22 July 2013	(Honduras) Jona	Granada	Jaén	Loan
22 July 2013	René Román	Barakaldo	Jaén	Free
22 July 2013	José Manuel Cruz	Lucena	Jaén	Free
22 July 2013	Jordi Figueras	(Belgium) Club Brugge	Real Betis	€0.3m
22 July 2013	Ricardo León	Sporting Gijón	Tenerife	Free
22 July 2013	Albert Serrán	(Cyprus) AEK Larnaca	Alcorcón	Free
22 July 2013	(Paraguay) José Ariel Núñez	(Paraguay) Libertad	Osasuna	Loan
22 July 2013	(Scotland) Ikechi Anya	Granada	(England) Watford	Free
22 July 2013	Pelayo Novo	Elche	Córdoba	Loan
22 July 2013	Mario Rosas	Hércules	Eldense	Free
22 July 2013	(Portugal) Rudy	(Belgium) Cercle Brugge	Deportivo La Coruña	Free
22 July 2013	(Poland) Paweł Brożek	Recreativo	(Poland) Wisła Kraków	Free
23 July 2013	Emilio Sánchez	Murcia	Alavés	Free
23 July 2013	Alberto Botía	Sevilla	Elche	Loan
23 July 2013	Yuri Berchiche	Real Sociedad	Eibar	Loan
23 July 2013	Alain Eizmendi	Real Sociedad	Eibar	Loan
23 July 2013	Domingo Cisma	Atlético Madrid	Elche	Free
23 July 2013	Rubén Martínez	Málaga	Rayo Vallecano	Free
23 July 2013	Borja Gómez	Granada	Hércules	Loan
23 July 2013	Juanma Ortiz	Granada	Hércules	Loan
23 July 2013	Héctor Yuste	Granada	Hércules	Loan
23 July 2013	David Ferreiro	Granada	Hércules	Loan
23 July 2013	Iriome González	Villarreal B	Mirandés	Free
23 July 2013	Sergio Asenjo	Atlético Madrid	Villarreal	Loan
23 July 2013	Sergio Herrera	Alavés	Laudio	Loan
24 July 2013	(Brazil) Júlio Baptista	Málaga	(Brazil) Cruzeiro	Free
24 July 2013	(Tunisia) Mehdi Nafti	Murcia	Cádiz	Free
24 July 2013	Pablo Sánchez	Cádiz	Lugo	Free
24 July 2013	Rubén Arroyo	Eibar	(Cyprus) Ethnikos Achna	Free
24 July 2013	(Romania) Dinu Moldovan	(Romania) Universitatea Cluj	Ponferradina	Free
24 July 2013	(Argentina) Marcos Angeleri	(Argentina) Estudiantes	Málaga	Free
24 July 2013	Mikel Juaristi	Eibar	Laudio	Free
25 July 2013	Casto	Real Betis	Murcia	Free
25 July 2013	Iván Moreno	Ponferradina	Murcia	Free
25 July 2013	Jito	Eibar	Sestao River Club	Free
25 July 2013	(France) Kevin Gameiro	(France) Paris Saint-Germain	Sevilla	€10m
25 July 2013	(Venezuela) Dani Hernández	Valladolid	(Greece) Asteras Tripolis	Loan
25 July 2013	Edu Bedia	Hércules	Barcelona B	Free
25 July 2013	Didac Devesa	Mallorca	Lleida Esportiu	Free
25 July 2013	Sergio Cidoncha	Atlético Madrid	Zaragoza	Loan
25 July 2013	(Uruguay) Braian Rodríguez	(Chile) Huachipato	Real Betis	€1m
25 July 2013	Dídac Vilà	(Italy) Milan	Real Betis	Loan
25 July 2013	(Romania) Cristian Săpunaru	Zaragoza	Elche	Free
25 July 2013	Guille Roldán	Eibar	Melilla	Free
25 July 2013	Carlos Portero	Tenerife	Fuenlabrada	Free
26 July 2013	Jaime Astrain	Córdoba	Cartagena	Loan
26 July 2013	(Argentina) Fernando Gago	Valencia	(Argentina) Boca Juniors	€1.7m
26 July 2013	(Italy) Vincenzo Rennella	(Italy) Genoa	Real Betis	Free
26 July 2013	(Italy) Vincenzo Rennella	Real Betis	Lugo	Loan
26 July 2013	Jorge Palatsí	Villarreal B	Girona	Free
26 July 2013	Roberto Jiménez	Zaragoza	Atlético Madrid	Free
26 July 2013	Roberto Jiménez	Atlético Madrid	(Greece) Olympiacos	Loan
26 July 2013	(Portugal) Pizzi	Atlético Madrid	(Portugal) Benfica	€6m
27 July 2013	Abraham Paz	Sabadell	(Israel) Bnei Sakhnin	Free
27 July 2013	(Chile) Francisco Prieto	(Chile) Colo-Colo	Mirandés	Loan
27 July 2013	(Argentina) Gonzalo Higuaín	Real Madrid	(Italy) Napoli	€37m
27 July 2013	(Martinique) Grégory Arnolin	Sporting Gijón	(Portugal) Paços de Ferreira	Free
27 July 2013	Jaime Romero	(Italy) Udinese	Real Madrid Castilla	Loan
29 July 2013	Gerard Bordas	Villarreal	Girona	Free
29 July 2013	(Bulgaria) Spas Delev	(Bulgaria) CSKA Sofia	Las Palmas	Free
29 July 2013	(Portugal) Pizzi	(Portugal) Benfica	Espanyol	Loan
29 July 2013	(Brazil) Sidnei	(Portugal) Benfica	Espanyol	Loan
29 July 2013	Dani Güiza	Getafe	(Paraguay) Cerro Porteño	Free
29 July 2013	José Antonio Pardo	Recreativo	Oviedo	Free
30 July 2013	Manolo Lucena	Granada	Mirandés	Free
30 July 2013	José Morales	Levante	Eibar	Loan
30 July 2013	Airam López	Numancia	Cádiz	Free
30 July 2013	(Ivory Coast) Romaric	Zaragoza	(France) Bastia	Free
30 July 2013	David Oliveros	Espanyol B	Real Madrid Castilla	Free
30 July 2013	Edgar Méndez	Almería	Jaén	Loan
30 July 2013	(Greece) Orestis Karnezis	(Italy) Udinese	Granada	Loan
30 July 2013	Oinatz Aulestia	Cádiz	Hércules	Free
30 July 2013	Rubén Durán	Lugo	Racing Santander	Free
30 July 2013	Agustín Fernández	Alavés	Racing Santander	Free
30 July 2013	Borja Granero	Recreativo	Racing Santander	Free
31 July 2013	Manuel Bonaque	Recreativo	Almería B	Free
31 July 2013	(Poland) Bartłomiej Pawłowski	(Poland) Widzew Łódź	Málaga	Loan
31 July 2013	Mikel Abaroa	Eibar	Real Sociedad	Free
31 July 2013	Mikel Abaroa	Real Sociedad	Real Unión	Loan
31 July 2013	Jota Peleteiro	Celta Vigo	Eibar	Loan
31 July 2013	(Argentina) Leonel Galeano	(Argentina) Independiente	Rayo Vallecano	Free
31 July 2013	Carlos Calvo	Almería	(Greece) Skoda Xanthi	Free
31 July 2013	(Portugal) Nélson	(Italy) Palermo	Almería	Loan
1 August 2013	Roberto Soldado	Valencia	(England) Tottenham Hotspur	€30m
1 August 2013	Juanma	Villarreal	Alavés	Free
1 August 2013	Javier Arizmendi	Getafe	Deportivo La Coruña	Free
1 August 2013	Diego Rivas	Elche	Eibar	Loan
1 August 2013	(Argentina) Joaquín Larrivey	(Mexico) Atlante	Rayo Vallecano	Free
1 August 2013	Alexis	Sevilla	Getafe	Free
2 August 2013	(Panama) Roberto Chen	(Panama) San Francisco	Málaga	€0.5m
2 August 2013	Adrià Carmona	(Italy) Milan	Girona	Loan
2 August 2013	Raúl Bravo	(Belgium) Beerschot AC	Córdoba	Free
2 August 2013	Borja López	Sporting Gijón	(France) Monaco	€2.2m
2 August 2013	Jony Ñíguez	Guadalajara	Alcorcón	Free
2 August 2013	Álvaro González	Recreativo	Real Betis B	Free
2 August 2013	(Dominican Republic) Heinz Barmettler	(Liechtenstein) Vaduz	Valladolid	Free
2 August 2013	Joan Guillem Truyols	Villarreal	Murcia	Free
2 August 2013	Lolo	Valladolid	(Portugal) Benfica	Free
3 August 2013	(Uruguay) Nacho González	Hércules	(Uruguay) Nacional	Free
4 August 2013	(Uruguay) Andrés Lamas	Alcorcón	(Uruguay) Liverpool (Montevideo)	Free
4 August 2013	(Chile) Igor Lichnovsky	Club Universidad de Chile	Getafe	€1.6m
4 August 2013	Óscar Serrano	Free agent	Alavés	Free
5 August 2013	Rafa García	Rayo Vallecano	Lugo	Free
5 August 2013	(Argentina) Marco Torsiglieri	(Ukraine) Metalist Kharkiv	Almería	Loan
5 August 2013	Aitor Fernández	Guadalajara	Hércules	Free
5 August 2013	Juan Muniz	Sporting Gijón	Mirandés	Loan
5 August 2013	(Colombia) Carlos Sánchez	(France) Valenciennes	Elche	Free
5 August 2013	Sergio Rodríguez	Ponferradina	Oviedo	Free
5 August 2013	Mario Marín	Murcia	Valencia Mestalla	Free
5 August 2013	Alberto Cifuentes	Murcia	La Hoya Lorca	Free
5 August 2013	Juanma Barrero	Ponferradina	Arroyo	Free
5 August 2013	Jon Altamira	Eibar	Amorebieta	Free
5 August 2013	Aimar Sagastibeltza	Eibar	Real Unión	Free
5 August 2013	Joseba del Olmo	Eibar	Laudio	Free
5 August 2013	Marcos Landeira	Sporting Gijón	Caudal Deportivo	Free
5 August 2013	Adrián Mouriño	Recreativo	Compostela	Free
5 August 2013	Alejandro García	Recreativo	Cádiz	Free
5 August 2013	Mikel Martins	Mirandés	Cádiz	Free
5 August 2013	Fran Pérez	Lugo	Cádiz	Free
5 August 2013	Kike López	Alcorcón	Cádiz	Free
5 August 2013	Sergio Díaz	Hércules	Avilés	Free
5 August 2013	Miki Martínez	Alavés	Olot	Free
5 August 2013	Egoitz Jaio	Numancia	(Austria) Wacker Innsbruck	Free
5 August 2013	(Argentina) Diego Tonetto	Lugo	(Argentina) Independiente Rivadavia	Free
5 August 2013	David Miguélez	Alcorcón	Racing Santander	Free
5 August 2013	(Morocco) Nabil Baha	Sabadell	(China) Dalian Aerbin	Free
5 August 2013	(Colombia) Humberto Osorio	(Argentina) San Martín	Valladolid	€1m
5 August 2013	Diego Sánchez	Fuenlabrada	Ponferradina	Free
5 August 2013	Iban Zubiaurre	Athletic Bilbao	Racing Santander	Free
5 August 2013	Jordi	Hércules	Levante B	Free
6 August 2013	Roger Martí	Levante	Zaragoza	Loan
6 August 2013	Álex Ortiz	Guadalajara	Alavés	Free
6 August 2013	Joseba Garmendia	Mirandés	Amorebieta	Free
6 August 2013	Iñigo Ruiz de Galarreta	Athletic Bilbao	Mirandés	Loan
6 August 2013	Javi Soria	Mirandés	Racing Santander	Free
6 August 2013	Pedro Ríos	Villarreal	Levante	Free
6 August 2013	Javi Barral	Guadalajara	Sabadell	Free
7 August 2013	(Cameroon) Aloys Nong	(Belgium) RAEC Mons	Levante	€0.2m
7 August 2013	Óscar Vega	Leganés	Real Sociedad	Free
7 August 2013	Óscar Vega	Real Sociedad	Real Unión	Loan
7 August 2013	Kiko Olivas	Córdoba	Sabadell	Free
7 August 2013	(Uruguay) Sebastián Cristóforo	(Uruguay) Peñarol	Sevilla	€2.2m
7 August 2013	Xavi Torres	Getafe	Real Betis	€1.5m
8 August 2013	Albert Dorca	Racing Santander	Murcia	Free
8 August 2013	Alberto Bueno	Valladolid	Rayo Vallecano	Free
8 August 2013	Miguel Torres	Getafe	(Greece) Olympiacos	Free
8 August 2013	(Portugal) Hélder Postiga	Zaragoza	Valencia	€3m
8 August 2013	Rubén González	Osasuna	(Azerbaijan) Baku	Free
8 August 2013	Xavi Annunziata	Osasuna	Oviedo	Free
8 August 2013	(Argentina) Nico Martínez	Murcia	(Argentina) San Martín de San Juan	Free
8 August 2013	Diego Rivas	Hércules	Eibar	Free
8 August 2013	José Francisco Mora	Hércules	Alavés	Free
8 August 2013	Markel Salgado	Eibar	Real Unión	Free
9 August 2013	José María Belforti	Lugo	Cádiz	Free
9 August 2013	(Argentina) Emmanuel Culio	(Turkey) Galatasaray	Deportivo La Coruña	Free
9 August 2013	(Poland) Cezary Wilk	(Poland) Wisła Kraków	Deportivo La Coruña	Free
9 August 2013	Salvador Ruiz	Valencia Mestalla	Tenerife	Loan
9 August 2013	Carlos Hernández	Zaragoza B	Sabadell	Free
10 August 2013	(Chile) Gary Medel	Sevilla	(England) Cardiff City	€13m
11 August 2013	Jonás Ramalho	Athletic Bilbao	Girona	Loan
12 August 2013	(Algeria) Essaïd Belkalem	(Algeria) JS Kabylie	Granada	Free
12 August 2013	(Algeria) Essaïd Belkalem	Granada	(England) Watford	Loan
12 August 2013	Borja Pérez	(Scotland) Kilmarnock	Tenerife	Free
12 August 2013	Ernesto Galán	Xerez	Las Palmas	Free
13 August 2013	(Portugal) Luisinho	(Portugal) Benfica	Deportivo La Coruña	Loan
13 August 2013	Daniel Aranzubia	Deportivo La Coruña	Atlético Madrid	Free
13 August 2013	Dani Bautista	Racing Santander	Murcia	Free
13 August 2013	(Netherlands) Berry Powel	Elche	(Netherlands) De Graafschap	Free
14 August 2013	(Brazil) Gilvan Gomes	Hércules	Eibar	Loan
14 August 2013	Javi Márquez	Mallorca	Elche	Loan
14 August 2013	(Brazil) Wellington Silva	(England) Arsenal	Murcia	Loan
14 August 2013	Rubén Peña	Valladolid	Guijuelo	Free
14 August 2013	(Peru) Christian Cueva	(Chile) Unión Española	Rayo Vallecano	Loan
14 August 2013	Francisco Sutil	Murcia	Sabadell	Free
14 August 2013	Christian Alfonso	Espanyol	Alcorcón	Loan
15 August 2013	(Brazil) Gabriel Paulista	(Brazil) Vitória	Villarreal	Free
15 August 2013	Natxo Insa	Celta Vigo	(Turkey) Medical Park Antalyaspor	Free
15 August 2013	Urko Vera	Alcorcón	Eibar	Free
15 August 2013	Javi Hervás	Sevilla	Hércules	Loan
15 August 2013	Esteban Granero	(England) Queens Park Rangers	Real Sociedad	Loan
16 August 2013	Ruper	Osasuna	Sabadell	Free
16 August 2013	Cristian Fernández	Guadalajara	Ponferradina	Free
16 August 2013	Jesús Álvaro	Tenerife	Guadalajara	Free
16 August 2013	Álex Martínez	Real Betis	Murcia	Loan
16 August 2013	(Senegal) Baba Diawara	Sevilla	Levante	Loan
16 August 2013	Vicente Iborra	Levante	Sevilla	€6m
16 August 2013	Adán Gurdiel	Ponferradina	Cultural Leonesa	Loan
17 August 2013	Robert Costa	Barcelona B	Badalona	Loan
17 August 2013	Borja González	Atlético Madrid	Deportivo La Coruña	Loan
17 August 2013	Fabricio Agosto	Real Betis	Deportivo La Coruña	Free
17 August 2013	Luis Morán	Mirandés	(Cyprus) Ermis Aradippou	Free
17 August 2013	(Portugal) Bruno Gama	Deportivo La Coruña	(Ukraine) Dnipro Dnipropetrovsk	€2.5m
17 August 2013	(Senegal) Rémi Gomis	(France) Valenciennes	Levante	Free
19 August 2013	José Catalá	Murcia	(Cyprus) Apollon Limassol	Free
19 August 2013	(Netherlands) Gianni Zuiverloon	Mallorca	(Netherlands) ADO Den Haag	Free
19 August 2013	Yerai González	Tenerife	Real Unión	Free
19 August 2013	Álvaro Giménez	Mallorca	Elche	Free
19 August 2013	Pedro Orfila	Sporting Gijón	Racing Santander	Loan
20 August 2013	Aitor Ortega	Eibar	Arenas Club de Getxo	Loan
20 August 2013	(France) Aly Cissokho	Valencia	(England) Liverpool	Loan
20 August 2013	Carlos Lázaro	Valladolid	Alavés	Free
20 August 2013	Sergio León	Reus Deportiu	Elche	€0.05m
20 August 2013	Sergio León	Elche	Murcia	Loan
20 August 2013	Iñigo Pérez	Athletic Bilbao	Mallorca	Loan
20 August 2013	Álex Pérez	Getafe	(Bulgaria) Levski Sofia	Loan
20 August 2013	Denis Suárez	(England) Manchester City	Barcelona B	€1.5m
20 August 2013	Miguel Ángel Sáinz	Barcelona B	(Italy) Reggina	Free
20 August 2013	Sergio Ayala	Barcelona B	Valencia Mestalla	Loan
20 August 2013	Jesús Rubio	Recreativo	Gimnàstic de Tarragona	Free
20 August 2013	Samuel López	Murcia	Real Balompédica Linense	Free
20 August 2013	Abel Suárez	Tenerife	Noja	Loan
21 August 2013	(Colombia) Abel Aguilar	Hércules	(France) Toulouse	€1.8m
21 August 2013	(Portugal) Miguel Garcia	(Turkey) Orduspor	Mallorca	Free
22 August 2013	Mikel Rico	Granada	Athletic Bilbao	€2.8m
21 August 2013	Quique	Valladolid	Guadalajara	Free
22 August 2013	Jon Aurtenetxe	Athletic Bilbao	Celta Vigo	Loan
23 August 2013	Cristian Gómez	Espanyol	Real Madrid Castilla	Loan
23 August 2013	Iago Falqué	(England) Tottenham Hotspur	Rayo Vallecano	Loan
23 August 2013	Álex Bernal	Granada	Huesca	Free
23 August 2013	Aythami Artiles	Deportivo La Coruña	Las Palmas	Free
23 August 2013	Braulio Nóbrega	Hércules	(Malaysia) Johor Darul Takzim	Free
23 August 2013	Juanjo Serrano	Guadalajara	Lugo	Free
24 August 2013	Sergi Enrich	Mallorca	Numancia	Free
24 August 2013	Txema Pan	Mirandés	Amorebieta	Loan
25 August 2013	Abdón Prats	Mallorca	Burgos	Loan
26 August 2013	(Italy) Tiberio Guarente	Sevilla	(Italy) Catania	Loan
26 August 2013	Martí Riverola	(Italy) Bologna	Mallorca	Loan
26 August 2013	Luismi Gracia	Alavés	Huracán Valencia	Free
26 August 2013	(Cameroon) Stéphane Mbia	(England) Queens Park Rangers	Sevilla	Loan
26 August 2013	Mateo Míguez	Ponferradina	Guadalajara	Free
26 August 2013	(Czech Republic) Jiří Jarošík	(Czech Republic) Sparta Prague	Alavés	Free
26 August 2013	Jordi Quintillà	Barcelona B	L'Hospitalet	Loan
26 August 2013	Julen Iriarte	Eibar	Logroñés	Loan
26 August 2013	Recio	Málaga	Granada	Loan
26 August 2013	Martí Crespí	Racing Santander	Sabadell	Free
27 August 2013	Álvaro Mejía	Almería	(Greece) Ergotelis	Free
27 August 2013	(Ghana) Richmond Boakye	(Italy) Juventus	Elche	Loan
27 August 2013	Adri Paz	Jaén	Almería B	Loan
27 August 2013	(Colombia) Dorlan Pabón	(Mexico) Monterrey	Valencia	€7.5m
27 August 2013	(Nigeria) Odion Ighalo	(Italy) Udinese	Granada	Loan
27 August 2013	(Chile) Ángelo Henríquez	(England) Manchester United	Zaragoza	Loan
28 August 2013	(France) Dimitri Foulquier	(France) Rennes	Granada	Loan
28 August 2013	(Ghana) Wakaso Mubarak	Espanyol	(Russia) Rubin Kazan	€6m
28 August 2013	(France) Geoffrey Kondogbia	Sevilla	(France) Monaco	€20m
28 August 2013	(Serbia) Dejan Lekić	(Turkey) Gençlerbirliği	Sporting Gijón	Loan
28 August 2013	(Argentina) Martín Demichelis	Atlético Madrid	(England) Manchester City	€5m
28 August 2013	Kiko Femenía	Barcelona B	Real Madrid Castilla	Free
28 August 2013	Juanlu	Levante	(Greece) AEL Kalloni	Free
28 August 2013	Álex Fernández	Real Madrid Castilla	Espanyol	€0.5m
28 August 2013	(Portugal) Hélder Barbosa	(Portugal) Braga	Almería	Loan
28 August 2013	(Italy) Fausto Rossi	(Italy) Juventus	Valladolid	Loan
29 August 2013	Ander Lafuente	Ponferradina	Racing Santander	Free
29 August 2013	Urtzi Iturrioz	Alavés	Salamanca	Free
29 August 2013	Aitor Blanco	Mirandés	Amorebieta	Free
29 August 2013	Marco Navas	Recreativo	(England) Bury	Free
29 August 2013	(Morocco) Mounir El Hamdaoui	(Italy) Fiorentina	Málaga	Loan
29 August 2013	(Argentina) Germán Pacheco	(Peru) Juan Aurich	Córdoba	Loan
29 August 2013	(Portugal) Zé Castro	Deportivo La Coruña	Rayo Vallecano	Free
29 August 2013	(Ghana) Jacob Akrong	Granada	Guadalajara	Loan
29 August 2013	Toti	Granada	Alavés	Loan
29 August 2013	(Uruguay) Seba Fernández	Málaga	Rayo Vallecano	Free
30 August 2013	Jonathan Viera	Valencia	Rayo Vallecano	Loan
30 August 2013	Albert Puigdollers	Recreativo	Badalona	Free
30 August 2013	Antonio Martínez	Real Madrid Castilla	Alcorcón	Free
30 August 2013	(Brazil) Henrique Almeida	(Brazil) Botafogo	Real Madrid Castilla	Loan
30 August 2013	Quique de Lucas	Celta Vigo	Hércules	Free
31 August 2013	(Belgium) Toby Alderweireld	(Netherlands) Ajax	Atlético Madrid	€5m
31 August 2013	(Argentina) Lisandro López	(Portugal) Benfica	Getafe	Loan
31 August 2013	(Russia) Denis Cheryshev	Real Madrid	Sevilla	Loan
1 September 2013	(Wales) Gareth Bale	(England) Tottenham Hotspur	Real Madrid	€90m
1 September 2013	(France) Josuha Guilavogui	(France) Saint-Étienne	Atlético Madrid	€10m
1 September 2013	(Brazil) Kaká	Real Madrid	(Italy) Milan	Free
2 September 2013	(Italy) Antonio Rozzi	(Italy) Lazio	Real Madrid Castilla	Free
2 September 2013	Carlos Marchena	Free agent	Deportivo La Coruña	Free
2 September 2013	Gaspar Gálvez	Córdoba	Mirandés	Free
2 September 2013	(Argentina) Alexander Szymanowski	Recreativo	(Denmark) Brøndby	Loan
2 September 2013	(Mexico) Ulises Dávila	(England) Chelsea	Córdoba	Loan
2 September 2013	(Uruguay) Nicolás Schenone	(Uruguay) Liverpool (Montevideo)	Alavés	Free
2 September 2013	(Brazil) Douglas Santos	Granada	(Italy) Udinese	Loan
2 September 2013	Dani Pacheco	(England) Liverpool	Alcorcón	Free
2 September 2013	Raúl Tamudo	Rayo Vallecano	Sabadell	Free
2 September 2013	Álvaro Vázquez	Getafe	(England) Swansea City	Loan
2 September 2013	Nicolás Cañizares	(Italy) Juventus	Rayo Vallecano	Loan
2 September 2013	(France) Dominique Malonga	(Italy) Cesena	Murcia	Loan
2 September 2013	(Colombia) Jhon Córdoba	(Mexico) Chiapas	Espanyol	Loan
2 September 2013	(Romania) Gabriel Torje	(Italy) Udinese	Espanyol	Loan
2 September 2013	(Germany) Mesut Özil	Real Madrid	(England) Arsenal	€46m
2 September 2013	(Argentina) Walter Acevedo	(Argentina) River Plate	Zaragoza	Loan
2 September 2013	(Switzerland) Alex Geijo	(Italy) Udinese	Mallorca	Loan
2 September 2013	Unai Expósito	Numancia	Barakaldo	Free
2 September 2013	Enrique Castaño	Alcorcón	Las Palmas Atlético	Free
2 September 2013	(Chile) Felipe Gallegos	Club Universidad de Chile	Recreativo	Free
2 September 2013	Abel Molinero	Almería	Jaén	Free
2 September 2013	(France) Abdoul Sissoko	(Italy) Udinese	Hércules	Loan
2 September 2013	(France) John Ayina	Córdoba	Racing Santander	Free
2 September 2013	(Chile) Matías Campos	(Italy) Udinese	Granada	Loan
2 September 2013	(France) Michael Pereira	Mallorca	Granada	Loan
2 September 2013	David Mateos	Real Madrid Castilla	(Hungary) Ferencváros	Free
2 September 2013	Óscar Plano	Real Madrid Castilla	Alcorcón	Loan
2 September 2013	(Uruguay) Leandro Cabrera	Atlético Madrid	Real Madrid Castilla	Free
2 September 2013	Carlos Aranda	Granada	Las Palmas	Free
2 September 2013	(Iran) Masoud Shojaei	Osasuna	Las Palmas	Free
2 September 2013	Juanpe Ramírez	Las Palmas	Racing Santander	Free
2 September 2013	(Brazil) Guilherme Siqueira	Granada	(Portugal) Benfica	Loan
2 September 2013	Edu Oriol	Zaragoza	(Azerbaijan) Khazar Lankaran	Free
2 September 2013	(Hungary) Ádám Pintér	Zaragoza	(Russia) Tom Tomsk	Free
2 September 2013	(Serbia) Stefan Babović	Zaragoza	(Serbia) Voždovac	Free
4 September 2013	Miguel Ángel Nieto	Numancia	Racing Santander	Free
5 September 2013	David Rochela	Deportivo La Coruña	(Thailand) Buriram United	Free

== See also ==
- List of Spanish football transfers winter 2013–14
