= 2013 Segunda División B play-offs =

Spanish football league play-offs

The 2013 Segunda División B play-offs (Playoffs de Ascenso or Promoción de Ascenso) were the final playoffs for promotion from 2012–13 Segunda División B to the 2013–14 Segunda División. The four first placed teams in each of the four Segunda División B groups played the Playoffs de Ascenso and the four last placed teams in Segunda División were relegated to Segunda División B. It also decided the three teams which placed 16th to be relegated to the 2013–14 Tercera División.

== Format ==
The four group winners have the opportunity to promote directly and become the overall Segunda División B champion. The four group winners will be drawn into a two-legged series where the two winners will be promoted to the Segunda División and will enter into the final for the Segunda División B champion. The two losing semifinalists will enter the playoff round for the last two promotion spots.

The four group runners-up will be drawn against one of the three fourth-placed teams outside their group while the four third-placed teams will be drawn against each other in a two-legged series. The six winners will advance with the two losing semifinalists to determine the four teams that will enter the last two-legged series for the last two promotion spots. In all the playoff series, the lower-ranked club will play at home first. Whenever there is a tie in position (e.g. like the group winners in the Semifinal Round and Final or the third-placed teams in the first round), a draw will determine the club to play at home first.

== Group Winners promotion play-off ==
=== Qualified teams ===
The draw was held in the RFEF headquarters, in Las Rozas (Madrid), on 20 May 2013, 16:30 CEST.

Group	Team
1	Tenerife
2	Alavés
3	L'Hospitalet
4	Real Jaén

=== Matches ===
==== Semifinals ====
Team 1	Agg.	Team 2	1st leg	2nd leg
Real Jaén	1–2	Alavés	1–1	0–1
Tenerife	3–2	L'Hospitalet	3–1	0–1

The aggregate winners were promoted and qualified to the 2012–13 Segunda División B Final. The aggregate losers advanced to the second round promotion play-off for non-champions.

===== First leg =====
26 May 2013	Tenerife	3 – 1	L'Hospitalet	Santa Cruz de Tenerife
12:00 (WEST)	Luismi 11'; Raúl Llorente 54'; Medina 80'	Report	Juan Antonio 87'	Stadium: Heliodoro Rodríguez López; Attendance: 16,546; Referee: Valentín Pizarro Gómez

26 May 2013	Real Jaén	1 – 1	Alavés	Jaén
19:00 (CEST)	Servando 39'	Report	Viguera 89' (pen.)	Stadium: Nuevo La Victoria; Attendance: 11,500; Referee: Alfonso Melgares de Aguilar Fernández

===== Second leg =====
1 June 2013	Alavés	1 – 0 (2 – 1 agg.)	Real Jaén	Vitoria-Gasteiz
18:00 (CEST)	Viguera 76' (pen.)	Report		Stadium: Mendizorrotza; Attendance: 18,049; Referee: Óscar Herrero Arenas

2 June 2013	L'Hospitalet	1 – 0 (2 – 3 agg.)	Tenerife	L'Hospitalet de Llobregat (Barcelona)
12:00 (CEST)	Sergio 55'	Report		Stadium: La Feixa Llarga; Attendance: 5,400; Referee: Alfonso Vicente Moral

Promoted to Segunda División
Alavés (4 years later)	Tenerife (2 years later)

==== Final ====
Team 1	Agg.	Team 2	1st leg	2nd leg
Alavés	3–2	Tenerife	2–0	1–2

===== First leg =====
9 June 2013	Alavés	2 – 0	Tenerife	Vitoria-Gasteiz
19:00 (CEST)	Viguera 59', 89'	Report		Stadium: Mendizorrotza; Attendance: 7,228; Referee: José Emilio Sánchez Aparicio

===== Second leg =====
16 June 2013	Tenerife	2 – 1 (2 – 3 agg.)	Alavés	Santa Cruz de Tenerife
12:00 (WEST)	Aridane 6', 22'	Report	Viguera 37' (pen.)	Stadium: Heliodoro Rodríguez López; Attendance: 10,142; Referee: Ramón Arias Madrid

Segunda División B
2012–13 Winners
Alavés

== Non-champions promotion play-off ==
=== First round ===
==== Qualified teams ====
The draw was held in the RFEF headquarters, in Las Rozas (Madrid), on 20 May 2013, 16:30 CEST.

Group	Position	Team
1	2nd	Leganés
2	2nd	Eibar
3	2nd	Huracán Valencia
4	2nd	Cartagena
1	3rd	Real Oviedo
2	3rd	Bilbao Athletic
3	3rd	Levante B
4	3rd	Albacete
1	4th	Caudal
2	4th	Lleida Esportiu
3	4th	Alcoyano
4	4th	Lucena

==== Matches ====
Team 1	Agg.	Team 2	1st leg	2nd leg
Caudal	1–0	Cartagena	0–0	1–0
Lleida Esportiu	3–2	Leganés	2–1	1–1
Alcoyano	3–3 (a)	Eibar	2–2	1–1
Lucena	1–3	Huracán Valencia	1–0	0–3
Levante B	3–4	Bilbao Athletic	1–2	2–2
Real Oviedo	2–2 (a)	Albacete	1–0	1–2

===== First leg =====
25 May 2013	Lleida Esportiu	2 – 1	Leganés	Lleida
18:00 (CEST)	Imaz 46'; Mata 64'	Report	Izaguirre 21'	Stadium: Camp d'Esports; Attendance: 8,000; Referee: Luis Miguel Vallejo Aznar

25 May 2013	Levante B	1 – 2	Bilbao Athletic	Buñol (Valencia)
18:00 (CEST)	Roger 42'	Report	Guillermo 69'; Bustinza 89'	Stadium: Ciudad Deportiva; Attendance: 600; Referee: Víctor Manuel Sánchez Rico

25 May 2013	Caudal	0 – 0	Cartagena	Mieres (Asturias)
19:00 (CEST)		Report		Stadium: Hermanos Antuña; Attendance: 3,200; Referee: Aitor Gorostegui Fernández Ortega

26 May 2013	Alcoyano	2 – 2	Eibar	Alcoi (Alicante)
18:00 (CEST)	Cases 56'; Javi Lara 87' (pen.)	Report	Ander 17'; Abaroa 19'	Stadium: El Collao; Attendance: 2,875; Referee: Sebastián Ripoll Solano

26 May 2013	Lucena	1 – 0	Huracán Valencia	Lucena (Córdoba)
19:00 (CEST)	Obregón 20'	Report		Stadium: Ciudad de Lucena; Attendance: 3,500; Referee: Carlos Sánchez Laso

26 May 2013	Real Oviedo	1 – 0	Albacete	Oviedo
18:45 (CEST)	Simón 44'	Report		Stadium: Nuevo Carlos Tartiere; Attendance: 19,590; Referee: Adrián Cordero Vega

===== Second leg =====
1 June 2013	Huracán Valencia	3 – 0 (3 – 1 agg.)	Lucena	Manises (Valencia)
17:00 (CEST)	Fabiani 17'; Carlitos 21'; Carreño 79'	Report		Stadium: Municipal de Manises; Attendance: 2,100; Referee: David Jesús Pinto Herrera

2 June 2013	Bilbao Athletic	2 – 2 (4 – 3 agg.)	Levante B	Bilbao
12:00 (CEST)	Bustinza 9'; Eizmendi 46'	Report	Roger 38', 50'	Stadium: San Mamés; Attendance: 12,000; Referee: Iosu Galech Apezteguía

2 June 2013	Eibar	1 – 1 (3 – 3 agg.)	Alcoyano	Eibar (Gipuzkoa)
18:00 (CEST)	Jiménez 89'	Report	Álvaro 77'	Stadium: Ipurua; Attendance: 3,654; Referee: Ignacio Hermosilla Alaña

2 June 2013	Cartagena	0 – 1 (0 – 1 agg.)	Caudal	Cartagena (Murcia)
19:00 (CEST)		Report	Gonzalo 38'	Stadium: Cartagonova; Attendance: 5,054; Referee: Jesús Muñoz Mayordomo

2 June 2013	Leganés	1 – 1 (2 – 3 agg.)	Lleida Esportiu	Leganés (Madrid)
19:00 (CEST)	Pírez 88'	Report	Mario 89'	Stadium: Butarque; Attendance: 8,000; Referee: Juan Luis Pulido Santana

2 June 2013	Albacete	2 – 1 (2 – 2 agg.)	Real Oviedo	Albacete
20:00 (CEST)	Calle 52', 71'	Report	Manu Busto 55'	Stadium: Carlos Belmonte; Attendance: 10,000; Referee: José Luis Munuera Montero

=== Second round ===
==== Qualified teams ====
The draw was held in the RFEF headquarters, in Las Rozas (Madrid), on 3 June 2013, 17:00 CEST.

Group	Position	Team	Notes
3	1st	L'Hospitalet	Group Winners promotion play-off losers
4	1st	Real Jaén	Group Winners promotion play-off losers
2	2nd	Eibar	First round winners
3	2nd	Huracán Valencia	First round winners
1	3rd	Real Oviedo	First round winners
2	3rd	Bilbao Athletic	First round winners
1	4th	Caudal	First round winners
2	4th	Lleida Esportiu	First round winners

==== Matches ====
Team 1	Agg.	Team 2	1st leg	2nd leg
Caudal	1–2	L'Hospitalet	1–0	0–2
Lleida Esportiu	2–2 (3–4 p)	Real Jaén	1–1	1–1 (aet)
Real Oviedo	1–3	Eibar	1–2	0–1
Bilbao Athletic	3–3 (2–4 p)	Huracán Valencia	2–1	1–2 (aet)

===== First leg =====
8 June 2013	Caudal	1 – 0	L'Hospitalet	Mieres (Asturias)
19:45 (CEST)	Prosi 39'	Report		Stadium: Hermanos Antuña; Attendance: 3,290; Referee: Rubén Eiriz Mata

9 June 2013	Bilbao Athletic	2 – 1	Huracán Valencia	Sestao (Bizkaia)
12:00 (CEST)	Guillermo 3'; Guarrotxena 90'	Report	Omar 74' (pen.)	Stadium: Las Llanas; Attendance: 3,000; Referee: Hugo José López Puerta

9 June 2013	Real Oviedo	1 – 2	Eibar	Oviedo
18:30 (CEST)	Aitor Sanz 18'	Report	Mainz 58'; Guille Roldán 88'	Stadium: Nuevo Carlos Tartiere; Attendance: 20,635; Referee: Fernando Román Román

9 June 2013	Lleida Esportiu	1 – 1	Real Jaén	Lleida
19:00 (CEST)	Mata 21'	Report	Montes 87'	Stadium: Camp d'Esports; Attendance: 10,896; Referee: Santiago Varón Aceitón

===== Second leg =====
15 June 2013	Eibar	1 – 0 (3 – 1 agg.)	Real Oviedo	Eibar (Gipuzkoa)
19:30 (CEST)	Roldán 79'	Report		Stadium: Ipurua; Attendance: 4,686; Referee: Francisco Javier Fernández Vidal

15 June 2013	L'Hospitalet	2 – 0 (2 – 1 agg.)	Caudal	L'Hospitalet de Llobregat (Barcelona)
19:45 (CEST)	Corominas 26'; Juan Antonio 53'	Report		Stadium: La Feixa Llarga; Attendance: 2,000; Referee: Raúl Nicolás Espejo

16 June 2013	Huracán Valencia	2 – 1 (a.e.t.) (3 – 3 agg.) (4 – 2 p)	Bilbao Athletic	Manises (Valencia)
17:00 (CEST)	Fabiani 61'; Carreño 89'	Report	Eraso 80'	Stadium: Municipal de Manises; Attendance: 2,400; Referee: Víctor Pérez Peraza
	Penalties
	Amarilla (penalty scored); Omar (penalty scored); Fas (penalty scored); Capdevila (penalty scored)		Ramalho (penalty scored); Guarrotxena (penalty scored); García (penalty missed); Morán (penalty missed)

16 June 2013	Real Jaén	1 – 1 (a.e.t.) (2 – 2 agg.) (4 – 3 p)	Lleida Esportiu	Jaén
19:00 (CEST)	Óscar 50'	Report	Imaz 67'	Stadium: Nuevo La Victoria; Attendance: 9,000; Referee: Carlos López López
	Penalties
	Servando (penalty scored); Mario Martos (penalty scored); Israel (penalty scored); Elady (penalty scored); Migue Montes (penalty missed)		Asier (penalty scored); Miguel Ramos (penalty scored); Mario Fuentes (penalty missed); Imaz (penalty scored); Pau (penalty missed)

=== Third round ===
==== Qualified teams ====
Regulations determined the ties and were confirmed in the RFEF headquarters, in Las Rozas (Madrid), on 17 June 2013, 16:30 CEST.

Group	Position	Team
3	1st	L'Hospitalet
4	1st	Real Jaén
2	2nd	Eibar
3	2nd	Huracán Valencia

==== Matches ====
Team 1	Agg.	Team 2	1st leg	2nd leg
Eibar	4–0	L'Hospitalet	3–0	1–0
Huracán Valencia	1–1 (a)	Real Jaén	1–1	0–0

===== First leg =====
22 June 2013	Eibar	3 – 0	L'Hospitalet	Eibar (Gipuzkoa)
20:00 CEST	Roldán 3'; Mainz 5'; Jiménez 83'	Report		Stadium: Ipurua; Attendance: 4,633; Referee: Pablo Fernández Pérez

23 June 2013	Huracán Valencia	1 – 1	Real Jaén	Manises (Valencia)
19:00 CEST	Vidal 36'	Report	Migue Montes 7'	Stadium: Municipal de Manises; Attendance: 3,200; Referee: Alexandre Alemán Pérez

===== Second leg =====
30 June 2013	L'Hospitalet	0 – 1 (0 – 4 agg.)	Eibar	L'Hospitalet de Llobregat (Barcelona)
20:00 CEST		Report	Capa 90'	Stadium: La Feixa Llarga; Attendance: 1,800; Referee: Carlos Alberto Carbonell Hernandez

30 June 2013	Real Jaén	0 – 0 (1 – 1 agg.)	Huracán Valencia	Jaén
20:00 CEST		Report		Stadium: Nuevo La Victoria; Attendance: 15,000; Referee: Francisco Javier Hernández Maeso

Promoted to Segunda División
Eibar (4 years later)	Real Jaén (11 years later)

== Relegation play-off ==
=== Qualified teams ===
The draw was held in the RFEF headquarters, in Las Rozas (Madrid), on 20 May 2013, 16:30 CEST.

Group	Position	Team
1	16th	Zamora
2	16th	Zaragoza B
3	17th	Constància
4	16th	Villanovense

=== Matches ===
==== Semifinals ====
Team 1	Agg.	Team 2	1st leg	2nd leg
Zamora	5–3	Villanovense	3–0	2–3 (a.e.t.)
Constància	6–1	Zaragoza B	5–1	1–0

The losers of this tournament will be relegated to the 2013–14 Tercera División.

===== First leg =====
26 May 2013	Constància	5 – 1	Zaragoza B	Inca (Balearic Islands)
12:00 (CEST)	Mateu 3'; Jaime 48', 75'; Carreras 86'; Fullana 89'	Report	Diego 19'	Stadium: Nou Camp; Attendance: 2,000; Referee: Iván Muñoz Pérez

26 May 2013	Zamora	3 – 0	Villanovense	Zamora
18:00 (CEST)	Dani Hernández 30', 46'; Javi Hernández 62'	Report		Stadium: Ruta de la Plata; Attendance: 2,113; Referee: Víctor Areces Franco

===== Second leg =====
1 June 2013	Villanovense	3 – 2 (a.e.t.) (3 – 5 agg.)	Zamora	Villanueva de la Serena (Badajoz)
19:00 (CEST)	Willy 19'; Pina 30'; Óscar Martín 34'	Report	Alcázar 92' (o.g.); Granada 107'	Stadium: Romero Cuerda; Attendance: 1,400; Referee: José Luis Corral García

2 June 2013	Zaragoza B	0 – 1 (1 – 6 agg.)	Constància	Zaragoza
12:00 (CEST)		Report	Biel 60'	Stadium: Ciudad Deportiva; Attendance: 550; Referee: José Antonio López Toca

==== Final ====
Team 1	Agg.	Team 2	1st leg	2nd leg
Constància	1–2	Zamora	0–1	1–1

===== First leg =====
9 June 2013	Constància	0 – 1	Zamora	Inca (Balearic Islands)
12:00 (CEST)		Report	Javi Rodríguez 49'	Stadium: Nou Camp; Attendance: 1,200; Referee: Gorka Sagués Oscoz

===== Second leg =====
16 June 2013	Zamora	1 – 1 (2 – 1 agg.)	Constància	Zamora
12:00 (CEST)	Santos 18'	Report	Jaime 75'	Stadium: Ruta de la Plata; Attendance: 2,500; Referee: Antonio Santos Pargaña

Relegated to Tercera División
Villanovense	Zaragoza B	Constància

== See also ==
- 2012–13 Segunda División B
- 2013 Tercera División play-offs
- 2013–14 Segunda División B
