= Jorge Hernandez (footballer, born 1992) =

Spanish footballer

Jorge Hernández
Personal information
- Full name: Jorge Hernández Diéguez
- Date of birth: 6 February 1992 (age 34)
- Place of birth: Sanzoles, Spain
- Height: 1.68 m (5 ft 6 in)
- Position: Winger

Team information
- Current team: L'Entregu

Youth career
- Zamora

Senior career*
Years	Team	Apps	(Gls)
2010–2014	Zamora	117	(17)
2014–2015	Valladolid B	30	(10)
2014–2015	Valladolid	3	(0)
2015–2016	Sestao	34	(4)
2016–2017	Alcoyano	32	(4)
2017–2018	Pontevedra	30	(3)
2018–2019	Unionistas	35	(0)
2019	Inter de Madrid	0	(0)
2019–2023	Langreo	84	(3)
2023–2025	Caudal	10	(0)
2025–	L'Entregu	5	(0)
- * Club domestic league appearances and goals as of 12 October 2025

Jorge Hernández Diéguez (born 6 February 1992) is a Spanish footballer who plays for Tercera Federación club L'Entregu mainly as a winger.

== Club career ==
Born in Sanzoles, Zamora, Castile and León, Hernández finished his formation at local Zamora CF, and made his senior debuts in the 2009–10 season in the Segunda División B, aged only 17.

On 27 June 2014 Hernández moved to neighbouring Real Valladolid, being initially assigned to the reserves also in the third level. He made his first-team debut on 7 September, replacing Óscar Díaz in the 74th minute of a 3–1 home win over Racing de Santander in the Segunda División.

Hernández left the Pucelanos in 2015, and signed for third-tier club Sestao River on 3 August of that year. The following 20 July, he moved to fellow league team CD Alcoyano.
