= Oscar Martín =

Oscar Martín may refer to:

- Oscar Martín (footballer, born 1934), Argentine footballer
- Óscar Martín (footballer, born 1988), Spanish footballer
