= List of Spanish football transfers winter 2013–14 =

This is a list of Spanish football transfers for the January sale in the 2013–14 season of La Liga. Only moves from La Liga are listed.

The winter transfer window has opened on 1 January 2014, although a few transfers took place prior to that date. The window will close at midnight on 1 February 2014. Players without a club can join one at any time, either during or in between transfer windows. Clubs below La Liga level can also sign players on loan at any time. If need be, clubs can sign a goalkeeper on an emergency loan, if all others are unavailable.

== Winter 2014 La Liga transfer window ==
Date	Name	Moving from	Moving to	Fee
16 September 2013	(Venezuela) Andrés Túñez	(Spain) Celta de Vigo	(Israel) Beitar Jerusalem	Loan
16 December 2013	(Brazil) Pedro Castro	(Brazil) Santos	(Spain) Espanyol	Loan
17 December 2013	(Argentina) Hernán Pellerano	(Spain) Almería	(Mexico) Tijuana	Free
23 December 2013	(Spain) Mané	(Israel) Maccabi Tel Aviv	(Spain) Almería	Free
25 December 2013	(Chile) Matías Campos	(Spain) Granada	(Chile) Unión Española	Loan
27 December 2013	(Chile) Hans Martínez	Universidad de Chile	(Spain) Almería	Loan
1 January 2014	(Argentina) José Ernesto Sosa	(Ukraine) Metalist Kharkiv	(Spain) Atlético Madrid	Loan
11 January 2014	(Brazil) Léo Baptistão	(Spain) Atlético Madrid	(Spain) Real Betis	Loan
15 January 2014	(Spain) Jonathan Vila	(Spain) Celta de Vigo	(Israel) Beitar Jerusalem	Loan
20 January 2014	(Portugal) Tiago Ilori	(England) Liverpool	(Spain) Granada	Loan
21 January 2014	(Spain) Julián	(Spain) Sevilla	(Spain) Almería	Loan
21 January 2014	(Argentina) Oscar Ustari	(Spain) Almería	(England) Sunderland	Free
23 January 2014	(Spain) Samuel Llorca	(Spain) Celta de Vigo	(Spain) Alavés	Loan
24 January 2014	(Spain) Diego Rivas	(Spain) Elche	(Spain) Eibar	Loan
25 January 2014	(Spain) Íñigo López	(Greece) PAOK	(Spain) Celta de Vigo	Loan
27 January 2014	(Spain) Antonio Adán	(Italy) Cagliari	(Spain) Real Betis	Free
27 January 2014	(Cape Verde) Garry Rodrigues	(Bulgaria) Levski Sofia	(Spain) Elche	Loan
28 January 2014	(Spain) David Generelo	(Spain) Elche	(Spain) Mallorca	Free
29 January 2014	(Spain) Sergio Tejera	(Spain) Espanyol	(Spain) Alavés	Loan
29 January 2014	(Algeria) Hassan Yebda	(Spain) Granada	(Italy) Udinese	Loan
