= Gonzalo de la Fuente =

Spanish footballer

Personal information
- Full name: Gonzalo de la Fuente de la Iglesia
- Date of birth: 21 March 1984 (age 42)
- Place of birth: Burgos, Spain
- Height: 1.82 m (6 ft 0 in)
- Position: Defender

Team information
- Current team: Mosconia

Youth career
- Peña Antonio José

Senior career*
Years	Team	Apps	(Gls)
2003–2004	Peña Antonio José		
2004–2008	Burgos	70	(0)
2008–2011	Oviedo	45	(1)
2011–2012	Burgos	24	(0)
2012–2013	Caudal	39	(1)
2013–2014	Avilés	34	(1)
2014–2016	Albacete	51	(1)
2016–2017	Ponferradina	27	(0)
2017–2018	Racing Santander	23	(0)
2018–2020	Ibiza	50	(1)
2020–2024	Langreo	105	(2)
2024–	Mosconia	5	(0)
- * Club domestic league appearances and goals as of 12 October 2024

Gonzalo de la Fuente de la Iglesia (born 21 March 1984), sometimes known simply as Gonzalo, is a Spanish footballer who plays for Mosconia. Mainly a central defender, he can also play as a right back or defensive midfielder.

== Club career ==
Born in Burgos, Castile and León, de la Fuente made his debuts as a senior with lowly CD Peña Antonio José in 2003, moving to Segunda División B club Burgos CF a year later. On 15 July 2008, he moved to Real Oviedo also in the third level.

In July 2011, de la Fuente returned to Burgos, appearing regularly but suffering relegation. He continued to compete in division three in the following seasons, representing Caudal Deportivo and Real Avilés.

On 21 August 2014, de la Fuente signed a one-year deal with Albacete Balompié, freshly promoted to Segunda División. Nine days later, aged 30, he played his first match as a professional, starting in a 1–1 away draw against CD Tenerife.

De la Fuente scored his first professional goal on 3 May 2015, netting the first in a 2–1 home win against FC Barcelona B.
