= Manuel Bonaque =

Spanish footballer

Personal information
- Full name: Manuel Bonaque Acevedo
- Date of birth: 9 May 1991 (age 35)
- Place of birth: Huelva, Spain
- Height: 1.80 m (5 ft 11 in)
- Position: Centre back

Team information
- Current team: Recreativo
- Number: 4

Youth career
- Recreativo

Senior career*
Years	Team	Apps	(Gls)
2009–2012	Recreativo B	39	(0)
2012–2013	Recreativo	23	(1)
2013	→ Villarreal B (loan)	3	(0)
2013–2014	Almería B	29	(1)
2014–2015	Avilés	3	(0)
2015	Tarxien Rainbows	13	(0)
2015–2016	San Roque	31	(3)
2016–2017	Recreativo	29	(1)
2017–2018	Caudal	12	(0)
2018	Lorca Deportiva	12	(0)
2018–2019	Los Barrios	32	(1)
2019–2021	Villanovense	51	(4)
2021–2025	Mérida	117	(10)
2025–	Recreativo	32	(0)
- * Club domestic league appearances and goals as of 7 May 2026

Manuel Bonaque Acevedo (born 9 May 1991) is a Spanish footballer who plays for Segunda Federación club Recreativo mainly as a central defender.

== Club career ==
Born in Huelva, Andalusia, Bonaque made his senior debut in 2009, going on to appear in several Tercera División seasons with the reserve team. On 26 November 2011, he made his debut with the main squad, starting in a 1–2 Segunda División home loss against Xerez CD.

On 21 January 2012, Bonaque again played the full 90 minutes as he scored his first goal as a professional, but Recre lost 1–3 at FC Cartagena. In January 2013, he was loaned to Villarreal CF B after renewing his contract for a further two seasons.

Bonaque signed with UD Almería B of Segunda División B on 1 August 2013. On 21 August of the following year, he transferred to fellow league club Real Avilés.

On 13 January 2015, Bonaque terminated his contract with Avilés and moved abroad for the first time in his career, joining Maltese Premier League side Tarxien Rainbows FC.

On 17 June 2021, Banque joined Mérida AD.
