= Sanzoles =

Coordinates: 41°26′N 5°34′W

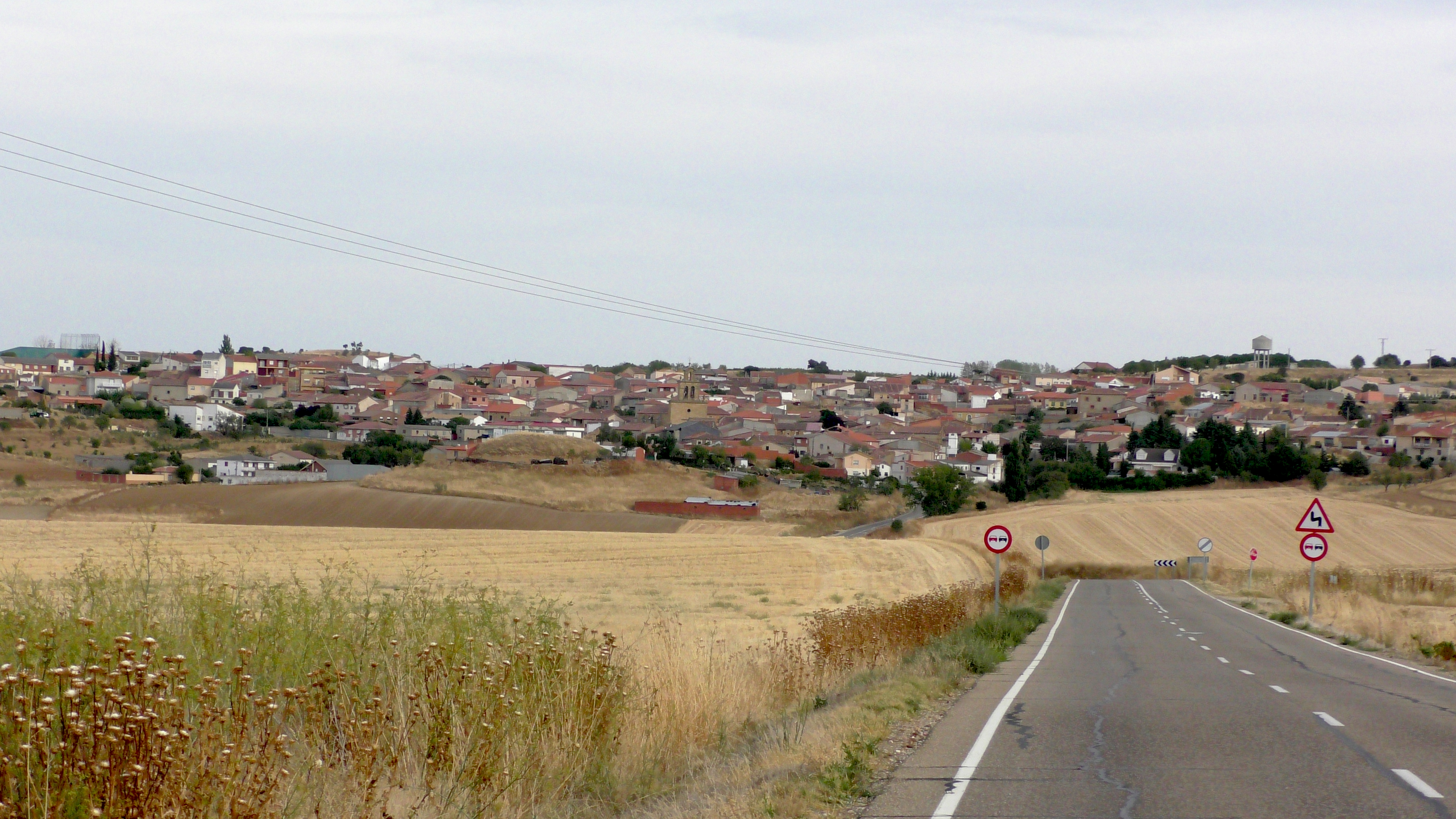
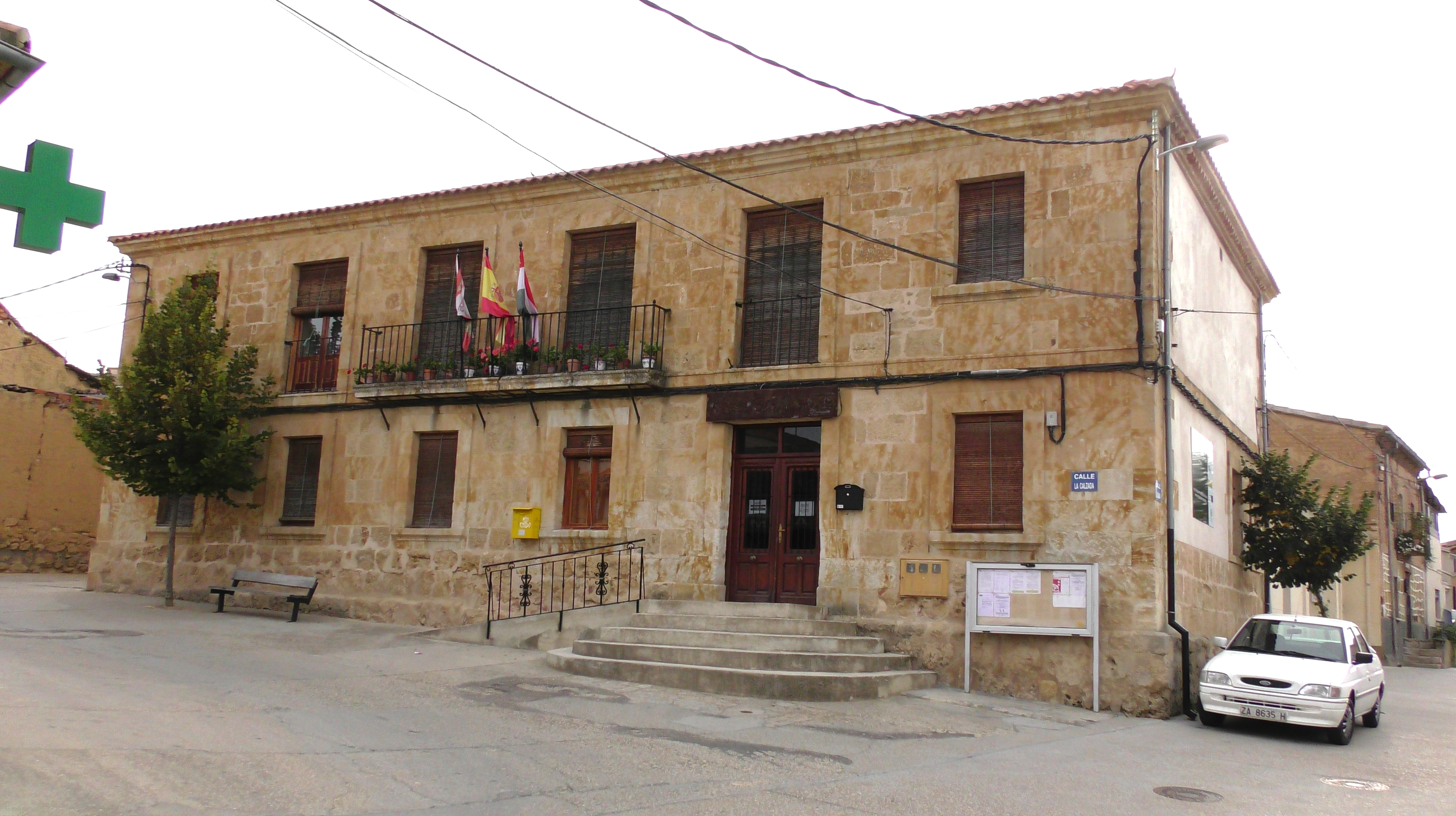
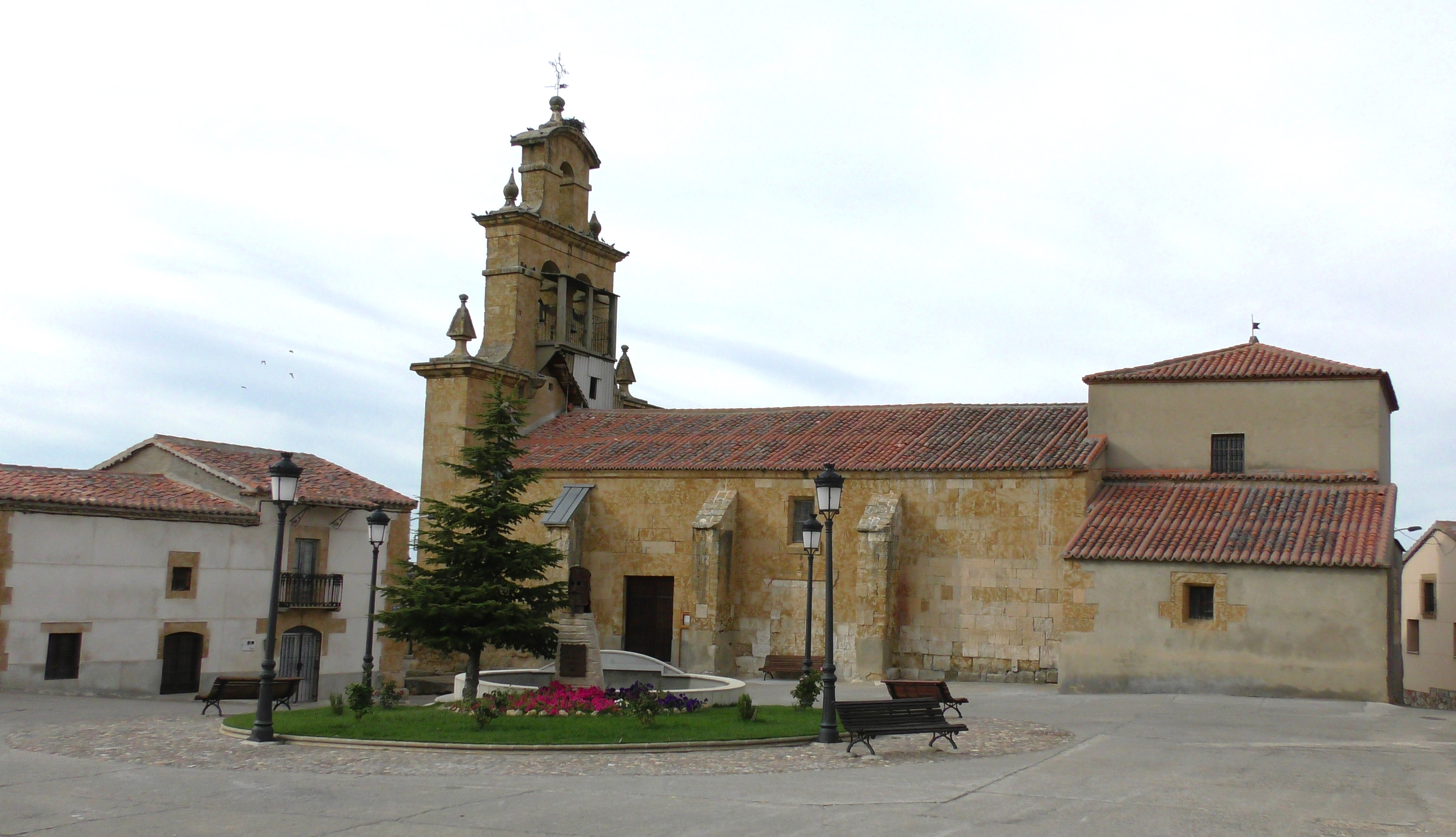
- Top down: View of Sanzoles, City Hall and parish church.

- Flag Coat of arms
- Interactive map of Sanzoles
- Country: Spain
- Autonomous community: Castile and León
- Province: Zamora
- Municipality: Sanzoles

Area
  - Total: 25 km^{2} (9.7 sq mi)

Population (2025-01-01)
  - Total: 454
  - Density: 18/km^{2} (47/sq mi)
- Time zone: UTC+1 (CET)
  - Summer (DST): UTC+2 (CEST)

Sanzoles is a municipality located in the province of Zamora, Castile and León, Spain. According to the 2004 census (INE), the municipality has a population of 646 inhabitants.
