= Ismael Bolívar =

Spanish footballer

Personal information
- Full name: Ismael Bolívar Fernández
- Date of birth: 8 February 1989 (age 37)
- Place of birth: Córdoba, Spain
- Height: 1.72 m (5 ft 8 in)
- Position: Defender

Team information
- Current team: Pozoblanco

Youth career
- Séneca

Senior career*
Years	Team	Apps	(Gls)
2008–2009	Villanueva	26	(0)
2009–2010	Poli Ejido B	19	(2)
2010	Lucena	2	(0)
2010–2012	Córdoba B	63	(1)
2011–2013	Córdoba	1	(0)
2012–2013	→ Guijuelo (loan)	30	(0)
2013–2014	Lucena	25	(1)
2014–2015	Écija	22	(0)
2015–2016	Ciudad Lucena	24	(0)
2016–2017	Pozoblanco	34	(0)
- * Club domestic league appearances and goals as of 01:24, 25 May 2021 (UTC)

Ismael Bolívar Fernández (born 8 February 1989) is a Spanish retired footballer who plays for CD Pozoblanco as a defender.

== Club career ==
Born in Córdoba, Andalusia, Bolívar made his senior debuts with CD Villanueva in the 2008–09 season, in Tercera División. He first arrived in Segunda División B in 2010, signing with Lucena CF.

On 13 July 2010 Bolívar moved to Córdoba CF, initially being assigned to the reserves in the fourth division. On 4 November 2011 he played his first game as a professional, coming on as a late substitute in a 1–1 home draw against FC Barcelona B in the Segunda División championship.

On 13 July 2012 Bolívar was loaned to CD Guijuelo, in the third level. Roughly a year later he returned to Lucena, on a permanent basis.
