= Israel Jerez =

Spanish footballer

Personal information
- Full name: Israel Jerez Martínez
- Date of birth: 8 August 1986 (age 40)
- Place of birth: Granada, Spain
- Height: 1.71 m (5 ft 7 in)
- Position: Winger

Youth career
- Arenas

Senior career*
Years	Team	Apps	(Gls)
2005–2007	Arenas	65	(9)
2007–2009	Granada	57	(6)
2009–2010	Toledo	28	(2)
2010–2011	Roquetas	34	(5)
2011–2012	Cacereño	33	(3)
2012–2014	Jaén	78	(8)
2014–2015	Alcoyano	32	(1)
2015–2016	Barakaldo	6	(0)
2016–2017	La Roda	20	(3)
2017	Mancha Real	12	(1)
Total		365	(38)
- * Club domestic league appearances and goals

Israel Jerez Martínez (born 8 August 1986) is a Spanish former footballer who played as a winger.

== Club career ==
Born in Granada, Andalusia, Jerez finished his youth career at local club Arenas CD, and made his senior debut with them in the 2004–05 season in the Segunda División B, suffering relegation. He returned to the third division only for 2007–08, when he signed for Granada CF.

In the following four years, Jerez continued competing in the third tier of Spanish football, representing CD Toledo, CD Roquetas, CP Cacereño and Real Jaén. He achieved promotion to Segunda División with the latter team in 2013, scoring seven goals in 37 games in the process.

Jerez played his first professional match on 18 August 2013, starting in a 1–2 home loss against SD Eibar. He made 35 appearances during the campaign, with Jaén eventually being immediately relegated to the third tier; his only goal in the second occurred on 15 December 2013, when he helped the hosts to defeat RCD Mallorca 2–1.

On 22 July 2014, Jerez moved to CD Alcoyano also from the third division.
