= Jaime Astrain =

Spanish footballer

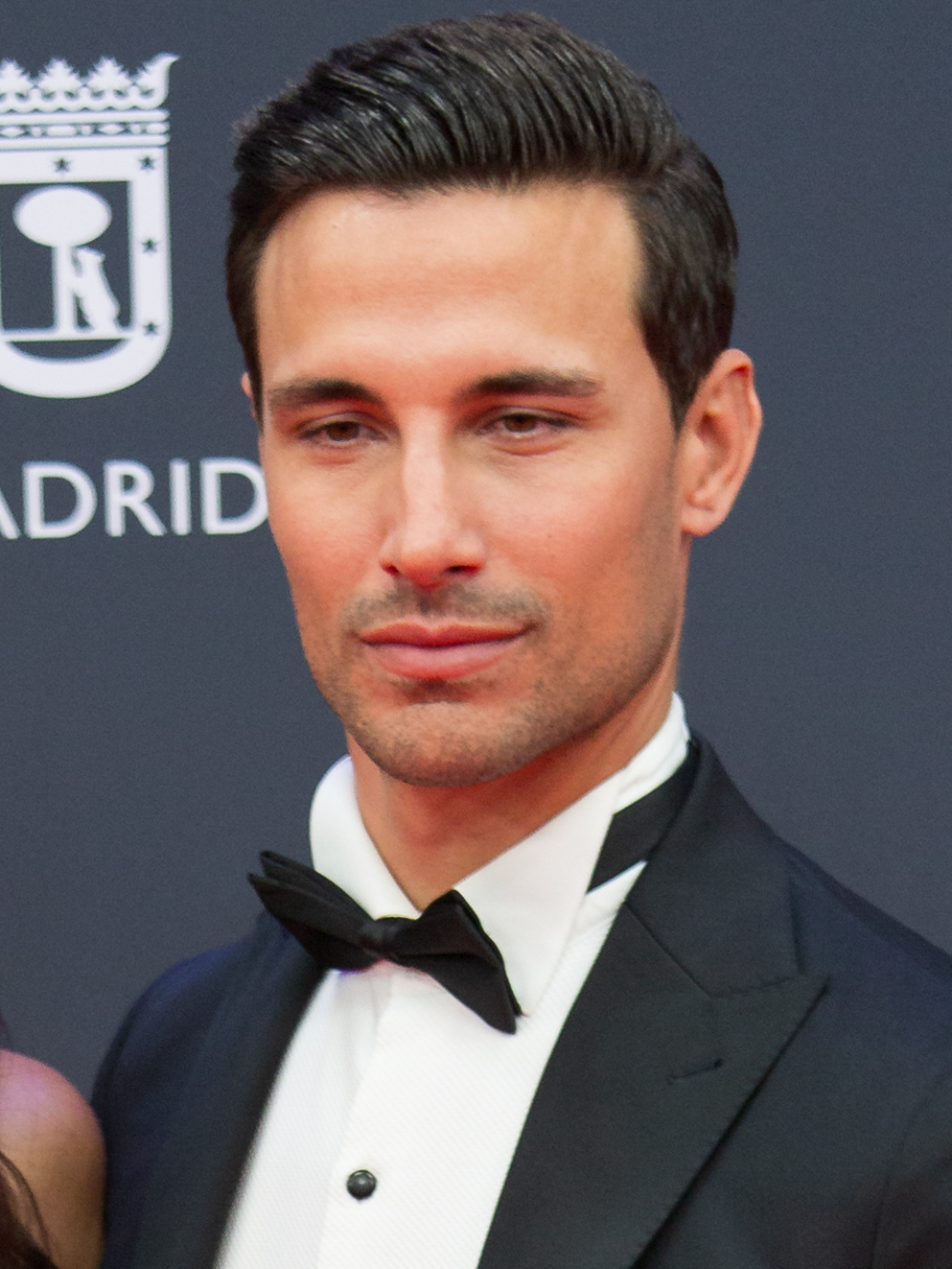
- Astrain in 2024

Personal information
- Full name: Jaime Astrain Aguado
- Date of birth: 5 February 1988 (age 38)
- Place of birth: Madrid, Spain
- Height: 1.89 m (6 ft 2 in)
- Position: Centre-back

Youth career
- Atlético Madrid

Senior career*
Years	Team	Apps	(Gls)
2006–2007	Atlético Pinto		
2007–2008	Pontevedra B	14	(0)
2008–2009	Móstoles	35	(0)
2009–2010	Villarreal C	30	(2)
2010–2011	Osasuna B	23	(0)
2011–2014	Córdoba	0	(0)
2012–2013	→ Écija (loan)	36	(2)
2013–2014	→ Cartagena (loan)	28	(1)
2014–2015	Jaén	25	(2)
Total		191	(7)
- * Club domestic league appearances and goals

Jaime Astrain Aguado (born 5 February 1988) is a Spanish former footballer who played as a central defender.

== Club career ==
Astrain was born in Madrid. He spent the vast majority of his career in the lower leagues.

Astrain's professional input consisted of 70 minutes in a 1–0 away win against Real Murcia in the second round of the Copa del Rey, while in representation of Córdoba CF. He had signed for the Segunda División club in June 2011.
