= Estadio Hermanos Antuña =

Football stadium in Mieres, Asturias, Spain

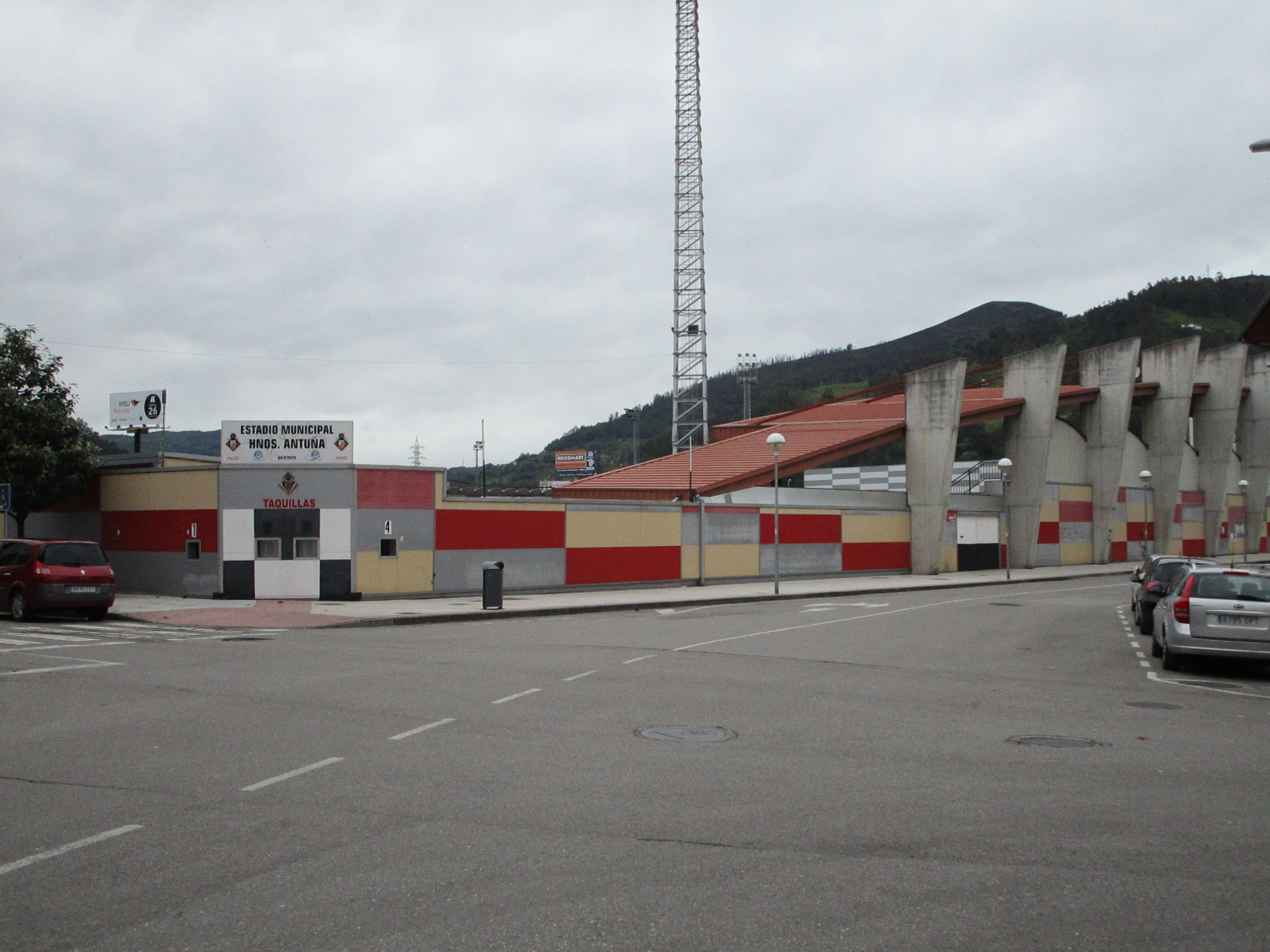
- Interactive map of Estadio Hermanos Antuña
- Former names: Nuevo Estadio del Batán (1951–1964)
- Location: Mieres, Asturias, Spain
- Coordinates: 43.256368°N 5.780365°W
- Owner: Municipality of Mieres
- Capacity: 2,940
- Surface: Artificial turf
- Field size: 101 × 66

Construction
- Opened: 16 September 1951
- Renovated: 2007

Tenant
- Caudal Deportivo

Estadio Hermanos Antuña is a football stadium in Mieres, and is the home of Caudal Deportivo.

== History ==
Inaugurated on 16 September 1951 with the name of Nuevo Estadio del Batán, it was renamed as Estadio Hermanos Antuña in 1964, in homage to the Antuña brothers, Joaquín and Ramón, who made an important labour during the first years of Caudal Deportivo, in that time called Racing de Mieres. Ramón Antuña was also president of the club during 29 years.

The stadium was reformed in 2007 and has 2,940 seats in its two stands. The old main tribune is protected by its cultural interest.

Despite having an athletics track, it is not enabled for official competitions as it has only four lanes, when six are needed.
