= Xavi Annunziata =

Spanish footballer (born 1987)

Personal information
- Full name: Javier Fernández Annunziata
- Date of birth: 31 August 1987 (age 39)
- Place of birth: Santa Cruz de Tenerife, Spain
- Height: 1.74 m (5 ft 9 in)
- Position: Winger

Youth career
- Tenerife

Senior career*
Years	Team	Apps	(Gls)
2006–2008	Tenerife B		
2008–2011	Osasuna B	94	(20)
2011–2013	Osasuna	7	(0)
2012–2013	→ Huesca (loan)	20	(0)
2013–2014	Oviedo	32	(1)
2015	Langreo	11	(1)
2015–2017	Caudal	67	(12)
2017–2018	Villanovense	24	(3)
2018–2019	Caudal	31	(4)
2019	Avilés	14	(2)
Total		300+	(43+)

Managerial career
- 2021: Caudal
- * Club domestic league appearances and goals

Javier 'Xavi' Fernández Annunziata (born 31 August 1987) is a Spanish former professional footballer who played as a left winger.

== Playing career ==
Born in Santa Cruz de Tenerife, Tenerife, Canary Islands, Annunziata joined CA Osasuna in 2008 from CD Tenerife B, going on to spend three full seasons with the reserves in the Segunda División B and scoring 12 goals in 30 matches in his last (30 starts). On 28 October 2010 he made his debut with the Navarrese's first team, in a 1–1 home draw against Deportivo de La Coruña in the round of 32 of the Copa del Rey. He made his first La Liga appearance the following 15 January, playing eight minutes in a 4–2 away defeat to Villarreal CF. He renewed his contract on 1 June, extending his link until 2013 with the option for two further years.

On 28 August 2012, Annunziata was loaned to Segunda División club SD Huesca until the end of the campaign, which ended in relegation. Subsequently, he resumed his career in the third tier and lower.

Annunziata retired in December 2019 aged 32, his last club being Tercera División's Real Avilés Industrial CF.

== Coaching career ==
On 24 March 2021, Annunziata was named head coach of fourth-division side Caudal Deportivo. He left in June.

Annunziata subsequently worked with Villarreal's youths.
