= Juan Antonio Osado =

Spanish footballer

Personal information
- Full name: Juan Antonio García Osado
- Date of birth: 7 August 1989 (age 37)
- Place of birth: Tarragona, Spain
- Height: 1.82 m (6 ft 0 in)
- Position: Forward

Youth career
- 2005–2007: Gimnàstic
- 2007–2008: Barcelona

Senior career*
Years	Team	Apps	(Gls)
2008–2009	Pobla Mafumet	31	(5)
2008	Gimnàstic	1	(0)
2009–2012	Logroñés	71	(12)
2012–2013	Hospitalet	51	(9)
2013–2015	Lleida Esportiu	52	(6)
2015–2016	Sabadell	19	(1)
2016–2017	Ascó	45	(3)
- * Club domestic league appearances and goals as of 29 December 2017

Juan Antonio García Osado (born 7 August 1989) is a Spanish professional footballer who plays as a forward.

== Club career ==
Born in Tarragona, Catalonia, Osado played for hometown side Gimnàstic de Tarragona before moving to FC Barcelona in 2007 to finish his development. However, after just one season in La Masia, he returned to his previous club, being assigned to the farm team CF Pobla de Mafumet.

Osado made his Segunda División debut with Nàstic on 14 December 2008, playing one minute in a 3–1 home win against Sevilla Atlético. It would be his only appearance of the campaign.

In August 2009, Osado signed a contract with UD Logroñés in Segunda División B, where he remained for two and a half seasons. On 11 November 2010 he put the visiting team ahead at Valencia CF for the Copa del Rey, but the hosts eventually won 4–1 and 7–1 on aggregate; in late January 2012 he joined another team in that level, CE L'Hospitalet.

In late July 2013, Osado moved to fellow league club Lleida Esportiu.
