= Samuel López =

Samuel López may refer to:

- Samuel López (footballer)
- Samuel López (tennis coach)

== See also ==
- Samuel Lopes, Brazilian footballer
