= Óscar Martín (footballer, born 1988) =

Spanish footballer

Personal information
- Full name: Óscar Martín Hernández
- Date of birth: 9 September 1988 (age 38)
- Place of birth: Arrecife, Spain
- Height: 1.74 m (5 ft 8 1/2 in)
- Position: Attacking midfielder

Team information
- Current team: Barco
- Number: 8

Youth career
- Lanzarote
- 2005–2006: → Teguise (loan)

Senior career*
Years	Team	Apps	(Gls)
2007–2009	Lanzarote	51	(9)
2009–2011	Tenerife B	61	(9)
2011–2013	Villanovense	64	(12)
2013–2015	Linense	63	(8)
2015–2016	La Roda	37	(7)
2016–2017	Miedź Legnica	15	(0)
2017	Socuéllamos	15	(4)
2017–2018	San Fernando	28	(4)
2018–2019	Talavera	29	(4)
2019–2020	Villanovense	22	(4)
2020–	Barco		
- * Club domestic league appearances and goals as of 9 September 2024

Óscar Martín Hernández (born 9 September 1988) is a Spanish footballer who plays for CD Barco as an attacking midfielder.

== Club career ==
Born in Arrecife, Lanzarote, Canary Islands, Martín was formed at local UD Lanzarote, making his first-team debut in 2007 in Segunda División B. On 10 August 2009 he moved to fellow league side CD Tenerife B, suffering relegation in his first year.

On 24 August 2011, Martín joined CF Villanovense also of the third level. He continued to compete in that tier in the following years, representing Real Balompédica Linense and La Roda CF.

On 9 June 2016, after scoring a career-best seven goals during the season, Martín moved abroad for the first time in his career after signing with I liga club Miedź Legnica. He played his first match as a professional on 29 July, starting in a 1–0 home win against Górnik Zabrze; he left Poland the following 18 January after 17 goalless appearances, and returned to his homeland the same month after agreeing to a contract at UD Socuéllamos.
