= Guillermo Roldán =

Spanish footballer

Guille Roldán
Personal information
- Full name: Guillermo Roldán Méndez
- Date of birth: 23 June 1981 (age 45)
- Place of birth: Córdoba, Spain
- Height: 1.78 m (5 ft 10 in)
- Position: Winger

Team information
- Current team: Atlético Espeleño

Youth career
- Córdoba

Senior career*
Years	Team	Apps	(Gls)
2000–2003	Córdoba B		
2001	Córdoba	5	(0)
2003–2008	Lucena	31	(3)
2004–2005	→ Guadalajara (loan)		
2008–2010	Atlético Ciudad	50	(8)
2010	Albacete	6	(0)
2010–2011	Melilla	38	(8)
2011–2012	Alcoyano	21	(1)
2012–2013	Eibar	33	(5)
2013–2015	Melilla	65	(9)
2015–2019	Europa	74	(27)
2020–2021	Ciudad de Lucena	24	(0)
2021–	Atlético Espeleño	57	(4)
- * Club domestic league appearances and goals as of 13 October 2024

Guillermo 'Guille' Roldán Méndez (born 23 June 1981) is a Spanish footballer who plays for Atlético Espeleño as a winger.
