= Diego Rivas (footballer, born 1987) =

Spanish footballer

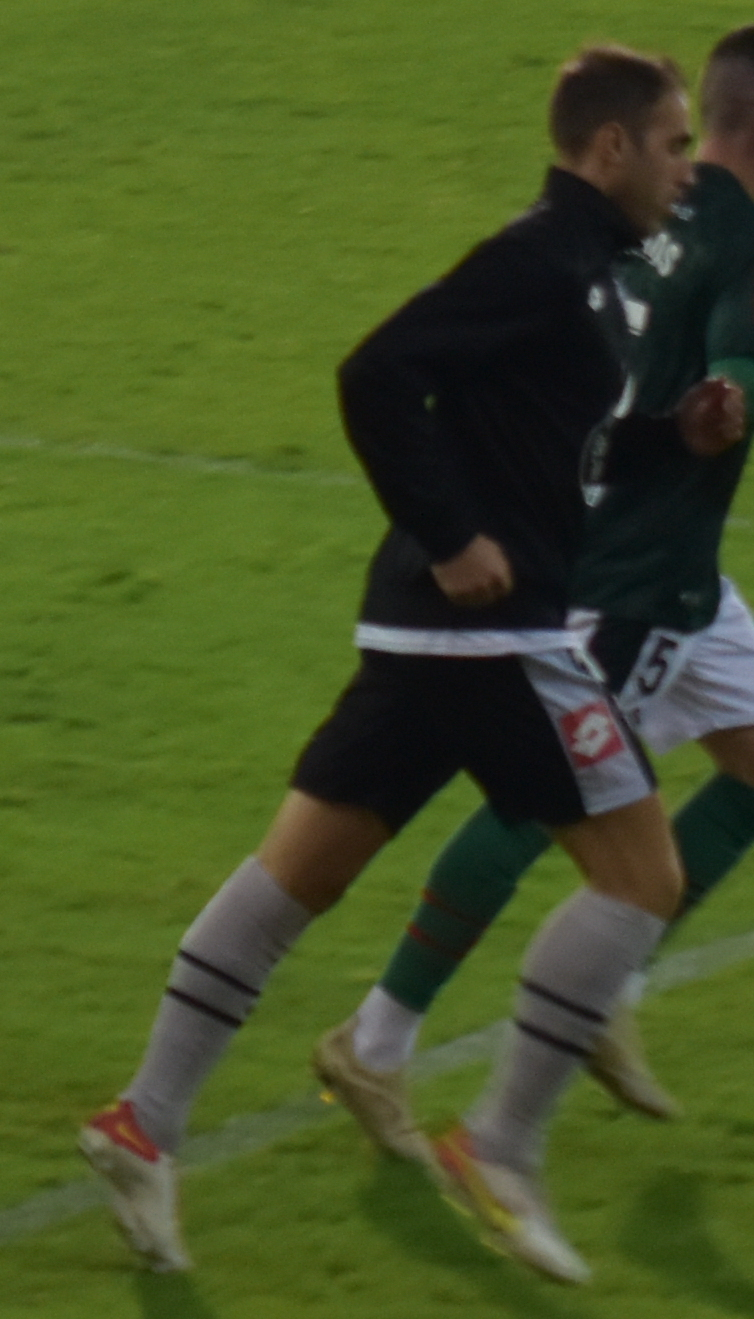
- Rivas with Racing Ferrol in 2022

Personal information
- Full name: Diego Rivas Rego
- Date of birth: 27 May 1987 (age 39)
- Place of birth: Narón, Spain
- Height: 1.81 m (5 ft 11 in)
- Position: Goalkeeper

Youth career
- Racing Ferrol

Senior career*
Years	Team	Apps	(Gls)
2006–2007	Galicia Mugardos		
2007–2009	Narón	25	(0)
2009–2011	Deportivo La Coruña B	43	(0)
2011–2012	Lugo	31	(0)
2012–2014	Elche	3	(0)
2013–2014	→ Eibar (loan)	1	(0)
2014	→ Tenerife (loan)	2	(0)
2014–2015	Albacete	8	(0)
2015	Guijuelo	0	(0)
2016	Auckland City	8	(0)
2016–2017	Murcia	25	(0)
2017–2018	Lleida Esportiu	34	(0)
2018–2023	Racing Ferrol	85	(0)
2024	Arenteiro	1	(0)
Total		266	(0)
- * Club domestic league appearances and goals

Diego Rivas Rego (born 27 May 1987) is a Spanish former professional footballer who played as a goalkeeper.

== Honours ==
Elche

- Segunda División: 2012–13

Eibar

- Segunda División: 2013–14

Auckland City

- OFC Champions League: 2016
