= Caudal Deportivo =

Association football club in Spain

Caudal
- Full name: Caudal Deportivo
- Nicknames: Caudalistas, Mierenses
- Founded: 6 July 1918; 108 years ago
- Ground: Hermanos Antuña, Mieres, Asturias, Spain
- Capacity: 2,940
- President: Roberto Ardura
- Head coach: Xavi Annunziata
- League: Tercera Federación – Group 2
- 2025–26: Tercera Federación – Group 2, 4th of 18
- Website: http://caudaldeportivo.es/
Home colours	Away colours	Third colours

Caudal Deportivo is a Spanish football team based in Mieres, in the autonomous community of Asturias. Founded in 1918 it plays in Tercera Federación – Group 2, holding home matches at Estadio Hermanos Antuña (built in 1951), with a capacity of 2,940 spectators.

== History ==
In 1914 Sporting de Mieres was founded, without any link to the Football Federation, and the club disappeared four years later, demoralized by the constant losses. That same year, on 6 July and after a draw to choose the name, Racing Club de Mieres was created, with the team being renamed Caudal Deportivo de Mieres after the Spanish Civil War, as all foreign denominations were forbidden.

In 1946 Caudal first reached the third division, promoting to the second five years later – the Segunda División B category would only see the light of day in the late-1970s. Starting in 1980 and with the exception of one year, the club would spend the following 18 seasons in the fourth level, then play seven out of eight years in the third, being relegated back in 2004.

Caudal won its group in the 2009–10 season – it had already finished first in 2006–07, albeit without promotion – and returned to division three after defeating Jumilla CF in the playoffs. At the end of the 2012–13 campaign, again in the third tier and just one year after promoting, it managed to qualify for the promotion playoffs after the fourth place in the regular season. However, Caudal was relegated again to Tercera División during the next season, but two years later came back to the third tier.

== Rivalries ==
Caudal's historic rival is UP Langreo. Both teams meet in the Asturian Mining basins derby.

== Season to season ==
Season	Level	Division	Place	Copa del Rey
1940–41	4	1ª Reg.	5th	
1941–42	3	1ª Reg.	6th	
1942–43	3	1ª Reg.	8th	
1943–44	4	1ª Reg.	4th	
1944–45	4	1ª Reg.	7th	
1945–46	4	1ª Reg.		
1946–47	3	3ª	8th	
1947–48	3	3ª	5th	Second round
1948–49	3	3ª	9th	First round
1949–50	3	3ª	1st	
1950–51	3	3ª	2nd	
1951–52	2	2ª	8th	
1952–53	2	2ª	10th	First round
1953–54	2	2ª	12th	
1954–55	2	2ª	13th	
1955–56	2	2ª	4th	
1956–57	2	2ª	11th	
1957–58	2	2ª	15th	
1958–59	3	3ª	2nd	
1959–60	3	3ª	1st	

Season	Level	Division	Place	Copa del Rey
1960–61	3	3ª	6th	
1961–62	3	3ª	3rd	
1962–63	3	3ª	1st	
1963–64	3	3ª	1st	
1964–65	3	3ª	3rd	
1965–66	3	3ª	3rd	
1966–67	3	3ª	2nd	
1967–68	3	3ª	5th	
1968–69	3	3ª	17th	
1969–70	3	3ª	4th	First round
1970–71	3	3ª	11th	First round
1971–72	3	3ª	12th	
1972–73	3	3ª	10th	Second round
1973–74	3	3ª	16th	Second round
1974–75	3	3ª	19th	First round
1975–76	4	Reg. Pref.	1st	
1976–77	3	3ª	8th	First round
1977–78	3	2ª B	16th	First round
1978–79	3	2ª B	20th	First round
1979–80	4	3ª	3rd	First round

Season	Level	Division	Place	Copa del Rey
1980–81	4	3ª	3rd	First round
1981–82	4	3ª	12th	First round
1982–83	4	3ª	8th	
1983–84	4	3ª	1st	
1984–85	4	3ª	8th	Second round
1985–86	4	3ª	2nd	
1986–87	4	3ª	1st	First round
1987–88	3	2ª B	18th	Third round
1988–89	4	3ª	3rd	First round
1989–90	4	3ª	4th	
1990–91	4	3ª	1st	Second round
1991–92	4	3ª	2nd	Fourth round
1992–93	4	3ª	1st	Second round
1993–94	4	3ª	1st	First round
1994–95	4	3ª	1st	Second round
1995–96	4	3ª	4th	
1996–97	4	3ª	3rd	
1997–98	3	2ª B	15th	First round
1998–99	3	2ª B	16th	
1999–2000	3	2ª B	14th	

Season	Level	Division	Place	Copa del Rey
2000–01	3	2ª B	9th	
2001–02	3	2ª B	19th	
2002–03	4	3ª	1st	
2003–04	3	2ª B	19th	First round
2004–05	4	3ª	7th	
2005–06	4	3ª	5th	
2006–07	4	3ª	1st	
2007–08	4	3ª	7th	First round
2008–09	4	3ª	7th	
2009–10	4	3ª	1st	
2010–11	3	2ª B	16th	Second round
2011–12	4	3ª	1st	
2012–13	3	2ª B	4th	Second round
2013–14	3	2ª B	16th	Second round
2014–15	4	3ª	2nd	
2015–16	4	3ª	1st	
2016–17	3	2ª B	15th	Third round
2017–18	3	2ª B	20th	
2018–19	4	3ª	3rd	
2019–20	4	3ª	4th	

Season	Level	Division	Place	Copa del Rey
2020–21	4	3ª	4th / 2nd	
2021–22	5	3ª RFEF	5th	
2022–23	5	3ª Fed.	6th	
2023–24	5	3ª Fed.	9th	
2024–25	5	3ª Fed.	2nd	
2025–26	5	3ª Fed.	4th	First round
2026–27	5	3ª Fed.		

- 7 seasons in Segunda División
- 14 seasons in Segunda División B
- 53 seasons in Tercera División
- 6 seasons in Tercera Federación/Tercera División RFEF

== Honours ==
- Tercera División (16) - record: 1949–50, 1958–59, 1959–60, 1962–63, 1963–64, 1983–84, 1986–87, 1990–91, 1992–93, 1993–94, 1994–95, 2002–03, 2006–07, 2009–10, 2011–12, 2015–16
- Copa Federación de España (Asturias tournament) (4): 1995, 1998, 2005, 2020

== Famous players ==
Note: this list includes players that have played at least 100 league games and/or have reached international status.

- (Spain) Alvarito
- (Spain) Berto

== Basketball section ==
Caudal Deportivo had a basketball section until the 1990s, that played in the Spanish third tier in the 1995–96 season.
