= 2011–12 Real Valladolid season =

Real Valladolid
2011–12 season
- President: Carlos Suárez
- Head coach: Miroslav Đukić
- Stadium: José Zorrilla
- Segunda División: 3rd (qualified to Promotion Play-off)
- Promotion Play-off: Winners (promoted to La Liga)
- Copa del Rey: Third qualifying round
- Top goalscorer: League: Guerra (17); All: Guerra (20)
Home colours	Away colours

The 2011–12 Spanish football season was Real Valladolid's second season in the second level in Spanish football after being defeated 3–2 on aggregate against Elche in La Liga promotion play-off in June 2011. This season will be the 31st of Real Valladolid in the second level in Spanish football. The general coordinator during last season, Chuti Molina, left his work on 14 June, becoming Real Murcia general director. On 17 June, Real Valladolid made official Abel Resino's detachment as he did not renew his contract as team manager. On 4 July, Carlos Suárez announced he had bought 59% of the club shareholding, becoming shareholder of Real Valladolid, and therefore the owner of the entity. At the same time he confirmed that he will not step down as chairman and, from the next day, news about the sporting aspect will be known. Earlier on 6 July, the club became official the incorporation of the Serbian manager Miroslav Đukić for the next 3 seasons. During that day, it also was confirmed that José Antonio García Calvo, general director, left his work.
Real Valladolid qualified in 3rd position in Segunda División, behind both Deportivo and Celta de Vigo, with 82 points. It was the first time in the history that any team with 80+ points wasn't directly promoted to La Liga. Deportivo de La Coruña beat Real Valladolid's points record, getting 91 points in the whole season. The record was established by José Luis Mendilibar's team in 2007 when Real Valladolid scored 88 points and were champions.
The team had to play the Promotion play-off again, and got the promotion to 2012–13 La Liga by winning 3–0 on aggregate to Córdoba in the Semifinal and by 2–1 to AD Alcorcón in the Final.

== Trophies balance ==
Category	Trophy	Started round	First match	Result	Last match
Friendly Trophy	1st Villa del Tratado Trophy	Final group stage	25 July 2011	Winners	25 July 2011
Friendly Trophy	14th Ramón Losada Trophy	Final	2 August 2011	Runners-up	2 August 2011
Friendly Trophy	Copa Castilla y León 2011	Quarterfinals	24 August 2011	Third place	20 September 2011
Friendly Trophy	38th Ciudad de Valladolid Trophy	Final	31 August 2011	Runners-up	31 August 2011
Competitive	Liga Adelante	—	28 August 2011	3rd (qualified for the Promotion play-off)	3 June 2012
Competitive	Promotion play-off	Semifinals	6 June 2012	Winners (promoted to La Liga)	16 June 2012
Competitive	Copa del Rey	Second qualifying round	8 September 2011	Third qualifying round	12 October 2011

=== Competitive balance ===
Biggest win
	Home				Away			
Liga Adelante	5 February 2012	Matchday 23	v. Nàstic Tarragona	4–0	7 April 2012	Matchday 33	v. Xerez CD	0–4
Promotion Play-off	10 June 2012	Semifinals, 2nd leg	v. Córdoba	3–0	13 June 2012	Final, 1st leg	v. AD Alcorcón	0–1
Copa del Rey	8 September 2011	Second qualifying round	v. Nàstic Tarragona	6–0	None due to elimination in the third qualifying round			
Biggest loss
	Home				Away			
Liga Adelante	17 September 2011	Matchday 5	v. Real Murcia	1–3	11 February 2012	Matchday 24	v. Córdoba	2–0
Liga Adelante	3 June 2012	Matchday 42	v. Guadalajara	1–3	25 February 2012	Matchday 26	v. Real Murcia	2–0
Promotion Play-off	None registered							
Copa del Rey	None due to elimination at the third qualifying round				12 October 2011	Third qualifying round	v. Celta Vigo	4–1

== Summer transfers ==
=== In ===
(substituted on) In (8 players)
Player	From	Fee
(Spain) Jaime Jiménez	(Spain) Elche	Free
(Spain) Dani Aquino	(Spain) Real Murcia	Free
(Portugal) Saná Camará	(Portugal) Benfica; Previously on loan in (Switzerland) Servette	Free
(Spain) Víctor Pérez	(Spain) Huesca	Free
(Spain) Mikel Balenziaga	(Spain) Athletic Bilbao	Free
(Venezuela) Dani Hernández	(Spain) Real Murcia	Free
(Ghana) Ismail Abdul Razak	(Faroe Islands) NSÍ Runavík	Free
(Spain) Fernando Varela	(Turkey) Kasımpaşa	Free
(Spain) Fran No	(Spain) Real Betis	Free

=== Out ===
(substituted off) Out (11 players)
Player	New Team	Fee
(Spain) Fabricio Agosto	(Spain) Real Betis	Free
(Paraguay) Justo Villar	(Argentina) Estudiantes La Plata	Free
(Spain) Álvaro Antón	(Spain) Cartagena	Free
(Spain) Jacobo Sanz	(Greece) Asteras Tripolis	Free
(Spain) Héctor Font	(Spain) Recreativo Huelva	Free
(Spain) Bubacar Bacari	(Spain) Espanyol B	Free
(Spain) Javi Jiménez	(Spain) Real Murcia	Free
(Spain) Pedro López	(Spain) Levante	€0.5M
(Spain) Raúl Navas	(Spain) Celta Vigo B	Free
(Spain) Pablo Gómez	(Spain) Salamanca	Free
(Spain) Antonio Barragán	(Spain) Valencia	€1.8M

=== Loan out ===
(substituted off) Loan out (1 player)
Player	Team
(Spain) Quique González	(Spain) Logroñés

=== Loan return ===
(substituted on) Loan return (3 players)
Italics for players returning to the club but left it during pre-season
Player	From
(Angola) Manucho	(Turkey) Manisaspor
(Spain) Marquitos	(Spain) Villarreal B
(Spain) Alberto Bueno	(England) Derby County
(Spain) Fabricio	(Spain) Recreativo Huelva
(Spain) Héctor Font	(Spain) Xerez

=== Loan end ===
(substituted off) Loan end (3 players)
Player	Returns to
(Portugal) Fábio Faria	(Portugal) Benfica
(Spain) Jordi Figueras	(Russia) Rubin Kazan; Then, loaned again, this time to (Spain) Rayo Vallecano
(Brazil) Guilherme	(Spain) Almería; Then, sold to (Brazil) Atlético Mineiro

=== Testing players ===
Testing players (1 player)
Liga Adelante teams can bring non-UE players to prove them without transfer and to decide later if they register them or not
Player	Current team	Test matches	Test result
(Ghana) Ismail Abdul Razak	(Faroe Islands) NSÍ Runavík	v. (Spain) Rayo Vallecano (30 July 2011) v. (Spain) Sporting de Gijón (2 August 2011) v. (Spain) Mondariz (5 August 2011) v. (Portugal) Boavista (9 August 2011) v. Numancia (14 August 2011)	Passed

== Winter transfers ==
=== Loan out ===
(substituted off) Loan out (1 player)
Player	Team
(Spain) Carlos Lázaro	(Spain) Huesca

== Personnel ==
=== Current technical staff ===
Position	Staff
Head coach	(Serbia) Miroslav Đukić
Assistant Coach	(France) Raymond Henric-Coll
Fitness Trainer	(Serbia) Dejan Ilić
Goalkeeper Coach	(Spain) Juan Carlos López

Last updated: 3 August 2011
Source: Real Valladolid

== Players ==
=== Squad ===
Note: Flags indicate national team as defined under FIFA eligibility rules; some limited exceptions apply. Players may hold more than one non-FIFA nationality.

No.	Pos.	Nation	Player
1	GK	ESP	Jaime Jiménez
2	MF	GHA	Ismail Abdul Razak
3	MF	ESP	Marquitos
4	DF	ESP	Marc Valiente
5	DF	ESP	Juanito
6	DF	ESP	Jesús Rueda
7	MF	ESP	Nauzet Alemán
8	MF	ESP	Javier Baraja
9	FW	ESP	Javi Guerra
10	MF	ESP	Óscar González
11	MF	ESP	Jofre Mateu
12	MF	POR	Saná Camará
13	GK	VEN	Dani Hernández

No.	Pos.	Nation	Player
14	MF	ESP	Jorge Alonso
15	FW	ESP	Alberto Bueno
16	MF	TUN	Mehdi Nafti
17	DF	ESP	Carlos Peña
18	MF	ESP	Álvaro Rubio
19	DF	ESP	Fernando Varela
21	MF	ESP	Sisi
22	MF	ESP	Víctor Pérez
23	MF	ESP	Dani Aquino
24	DF	ESP	Mikel Balenziaga
25	FW	ANG	Manucho
–	MF	ESP	Sergio Matabuena

=== Youth system ===
Note: Flags indicate national team as defined under FIFA eligibility rules; some limited exceptions apply. Players may hold more than one non-FIFA nationality.

No.	Pos.	Nation	Player
26	GK	ESP	Jon Villanueva
28	DF	ESP	Felipe Alfonso
29	DF	ESP	Tekio Blázquez
30	DF	ESP	Jordi López
32	DF	ESP	Víctor Mongil
35	MF	ESP	Francisco Ochoa

No.	Pos.	Nation	Player
37	MF	ESP	Javi Navas
—	MF	ESP	Javi Fernández
—	GK	ESP	José Antonio Salcedo
—	DF	ESP	Fran No
—	MF	ESP	Toni García
—	MF	ESP	Jorge Pesca

=== Called up by their national football team ===
List of players nominated by their national team
12	Saná Camará	Portugal U20	v. Uruguay (30 July 2011) v. Cameroon (2 August 2011) v. New Zealand (5 August 2011) v. Guatemala (9 August 2011) v. Argentina (13 August 2011) v. France (17 August 2011) v. Brazil (20 August 2011)
12	Saná Camará	Portugal U21	v. Poland (6 October 2011) v. Russia (11 October 2011) v. Moldova (10 November 2011) v. Albania (14 November 2011)
13	Dani Hernández	Venezuela	v. Argentina (11 October 2011) v. Spain (29 February 2012)
25	Manucho	Angola	v. Albania (10 August 2011) v. Uganda (4 September 2011) v. Guinea-Bissau (8 October 2011) v. (Portugal) Sporting CP (10 November 2011) v. Sierra Leone (14 January 2012) v. Burkina Faso (22 January 2012) v. Sudan (26 January 2012) v. Ivory Coast (30 January 2012) v. North Macedonia (29 May 2012) v. Uganda (3 June 2012) v. Liberia (10 June 2012)

== Match stats ==
No.	Pos.	Player	Goal			Booked			(yellow card) (yellow-red card)			Sent off (straight red)		
No.	Pos.	Player	League	Promotion P.O.	Cup	League	Promotion P.O.	Cup	League	Promotion P.O.	Cup	League	Promotion P.O.	Cup
1	GK	(Spain) Jaime Jiménez				1						1		
3	MF	(Spain) Marquitos	1		1	2								
4	DF	(Spain) Marc Valiente	1			6								
5	DF	(Spain) Juanito				3								
6	DF	(Spain) Jesús Rueda	1			7	1		1					
7	MF	(Spain) Nauzet Alemán	9		4	11			1					
8	MF	(Spain) Javier Baraja				4	3							
9	FW	(Spain) Javi Guerra	17	3		6	2							
10	MF	(Spain) Óscar González	13	1		1	1							
11	MF	(Spain) Jofre Mateu	3	1	1	3	1							
14	MF	(Spain) Jorge Alonso	1			1								
15	FW	(Spain) Alberto Bueno	7			3.								
16	MF	(Tunisia) Mehdi Nafti				11	1	1				1		
17	DF	(Spain) Carlos Peña	1			3	1							
18	MF	(Spain) Álvaro Rubio				6		1	1					
21	MF	(Spain) Sisi	5			10	1							
22	MF	(Spain) Víctor Pérez	6		1	9	1							
24	DF	(Spain) Mikel Balenziaga				6	1	1						
25	FW	(Angola) Manucho	4			1								
26	GK	(Spain) Jon Villanueva				1								
29	DF	(Spain) Tekio Blázquez				3						1		

== Match results ==
=== Pre-season and friendly tournaments ===
23 July 2011	CD Íscar (Spain)	0–2	(Spain) Real Valladolid	Íscar (Valladolid)
20:00 CEST	Rubio (yellow card) 48'	(Report)	22' Jofre; (yellow card) , (goal) 85' Pérez; (yellow card) Felipe	Stadium: Nuevo San Miguel; Attendance: 500; Referee: (Spain) (Castile and León) De la Fuente Ramos

30 July 2011	Real Valladolid (Spain)	3–2	(Spain) Rayo Vallecano	Medina del Campo (Valladolid)
19:30 CEST	Jofre 44'; Bueno 74'; Guerra 77'; Nafti (yellow card)	(Report)	26' Casado; 59' Delibašić	Stadium: Nuevo Municipal; Attendance: 1,000; Referee: (Spain) (Castile and León) Barbachano Plaza

5 August 2011	Mondariz (Spain)	0–6	(Spain) Real Valladolid	Mondariz (Pontevedra)
19:00 CEST		(Report)	2' Felipe; 39' Guerra; 48' Sisi; 81' Óscar; 82' (pen.) Alonso; 89' Bueno; (yellow card) Aquino	Stadium: A Lagoa; Attendance: 400; Referee: (Spain) (Galicia (Spain)) Correia Caballero

7 August 2011	Coruxo (Spain)	0–2	(Spain) Real Valladolid	Coruxo, Vigo (Pontevedra)
20:00 CEST		(Report)	33' Bueno; 76' Nauzet	Stadium: O Vao; Attendance: 700; Referee: (Spain) (Galicia (Spain)) Iglesias Villanueva

9 August 2011	Boavista (Portugal)	1–3	(Spain) Real Valladolid	Porto
21:30 CEST; 20:30 Local time	Malafaia (yellow card) 31'; Léo 36'; Borges (yellow card) 58'; Émerson (yellow card) 65'	(Report)	8', 26' Aquino; (yellow card) 31' Rubio; (yellow card) 48' Razak; (yellow card) 73', (goal) 81' Nauzet	Stadium: Do Bessa; Attendance: 600; Referee: (Portugal) Rodrigues Pacheco

11 August 2011	Real Valladolid (Spain)	2–2	(Spain) Athletic Bilbao	Burgos
20:30 CEST	Rubio (yellow card) 48'; Marquitos 54', 58'	(Report)	10' Toquero; 36' Iturraspe	Stadium: El Plantío; Attendance: 3,500; Referee: (Spain) (Castile and León) González González

14 August 2011	Numancia (Spain)	2–1	(Spain) Real Valladolid	El Burgo de Osma (Soria)
18:30 CEST	Nano 38', 73'; Larrea (yellow card) 78'; Pavón (yellow card) 83'	(Report)	(yellow card) 63' (yellow-red card) 80' Rueda; (red card) 78' Nafti; 81' (pen.) Bueno; (yellow card) 84' Baraja	Stadium: Campo de Fútbol Municipal; Attendance: 1,000; Referee: (Spain) (Castile and León) Campos Goeloe

==== 1st Villa del Tratado Trophy ====
	Pld	W	WP	LP	L	GF	GA	GD	Pts
(Spain) Real Valladolid	2	1	1	0	0	1	0	+1	5
(Spain) Zamora	2	1	0	1	0	1	0	+1	4
(Spain) Atlético Tordesillas	2	0	0	0	2	0	2	–2	0

25 July 2011 Match 2	Zamora (Spain)	0–0 (1–2 pen)	(Spain) Real Valladolid	Tordesillas (Valladolid)
20:00 CEST				Stadium: Las Salinas; Attendance: 500; Referee: (Spain) (Castile and León) Gijón Peñas

25 July 2011 Match 3	Atlético Tordesillas (Spain)	0–1	(Spain) Real Valladolid	Tordesillas (Valladolid)
21:00 CEST		(Report)	39' Alonso	Stadium: Las Salinas; Attendance: 500; Referee: (Spain) (Castile and León) Gijón Peñas

==== 14th Ramón Losada Trophy ====
2 August 2011 Final	Sporting Gijón (Spain)	3–2	(Spain) Real Valladolid	Luarca (Asturias)
19:00 CEST	Carmelo 57'; Mendy 69'; Sangoy 84'	(Report)	43' (pen.) Bueno; 65' Aquino	Stadium: La Veigona; Attendance: 1,000; Referee: (Spain) (Asturias) Coronas Durán

==== Copa Castilla y León 2011 ====
24 August 2011 Quarterfinals	CD Íscar (Spain)	1–6	(Spain) Real Valladolid	Íscar (Valladolid)
19:00 CEST	Adalia 60'		8' Óscar; 20' Marquitos; (yellow card) 35' Nafti; (yellow card) 49' Bueno; 52' Pérez; 74', 77' Aquino; 86' Jofre	Stadium: Nuevo San Miguel; Attendance: 1,000; Referee: (Spain) (Castile and León) Fernández Felipe

20 September 2011 Semifinals	Villaralbo (Spain)	3–1	(Spain) Real Valladolid	Villaralbo (Zamora)
20:45 CEST	Zambrano 22'; Obispo 46'; Manu 81'; José Luis (yellow card); Manu (yellow card); Gonzalo (yellow card); Charly (yellow card)		73' (pen.) Lolo; (yellow card) Razak; (yellow card) Gil	Stadium: Fernández García; Referee: (Spain) (Castile and León) Alberca García

==== 38th Ciudad de Valladolid Trophy ====
31 August 2011 Final	Real Valladolid (Spain)	0–1	(Spain) Getafe	Valladolid
21:00 CEST	Marquitos (yellow card) 38'; Felipe (yellow card) 66'	(Report)	(yellow card) 18' Sánchez; 86' Casquero; (yellow card) 90+1' Hugo	Stadium: Nuevo José Zorrilla; Attendance: 5,013; Referee: (Spain) (Cantabria) Arias López

=== Liga Adelante ===
Matchday	2	3	4	5	6	7	8	9	10	1	11	12	13	14	15	16	17	18	19	20	21	22	23	24	25	26	27	28	29	31	32	33	34	35	36	37	38	39	40	30	41	42
Against	NÀS	CÓR	GIR	RMU	CEL	ELC	ALM	RHU	NUM	ACY	LPA	XER	SDH	VilB	FCC	DEP	HÉR	FCB	SAB	ALC	GUA	ACY	NÀS	CÓR	GIR	RMU	CEL	ELC	ALM	NUM	LPA	XER	SDH	VilB	FCC	DEP	HÉR	FCB	SAB	RHU	ALC	GUA
Venue	A	H	A	H	A	H	A	A	H	H	A	H	A	H	A	H	A	H	A	H	A	A	H	A	H	A	H	A	H	A	H	A	H	A	H	A	H	A	H	H	A	H
Position	2	1	3	8	9	6	5	6	4	3	5	4	4	2	2	3	4	4	4	4	2	2	2	3	3	4	3	3	3	3	3	3	2	2	2	2	3	3	3	3	3	3
Goal Average (useful in case of tie)																						Won	Won	Drawn	Won	Lost	Lost	Won	Drawn	Won	Won	Won	Won	Won	Won	Drawn	Drawn	Won	Won	Won	Drawn	Won

Win Draw Lost

		All							Home							Away						
		Pts	W	D	L	F	A	Dif.	Pts	W	D	L	F	A	Dif.	Pts	W	D	L	F	A	Dif.
3	Real Valladolid	82	23	13	6	69	37	+32	46	14	4	3	34	17	+17	36	9	9	3	35	20	+15

Liga Adelante Winners (also promoted)
Direct promotion to Liga BBVA (Liga Adelante Runners-up)
Liga BBVA promotion play-offs
Relegation to Segunda División B

28 August 2011 2	Nàstic Tarragona	0–3	Real Valladolid	Tarragona
20:00 CEST	Fuster (yellow card) 6'	(Report); Live TV: GolT /	(yellow card) 28' Sisi; (yellow card) 29', (goal) 41' Alonso; 32', 43' Bueno; (yellow card) 42' Rubio; (yellow card) 85' Juanito	Stadium: Nou Estadi; Attendance: 4,000; Referee: (Balearic Islands) Sureda Cuenca

3 September 2011 3	Real Valladolid	2–0	Córdoba	Valladolid
22:00 CEST	Tekio (yellow card) 9'; Peña (yellow card) 43'; Bueno 67', 87'	(Report); Live TV:	(yellow card) 17' Aguilar; (yellow card) 28' Tena; (yellow card) 42' García; (yellow card) 43' Charles; (yellow card) 44' Hervás	Stadium: Nuevo José Zorrilla; Attendance: 7,420; Referee: (Canary Islands) Hernández Hernández

11 September 2011 4	Girona	1–1	Real Valladolid	Girona
20:00 CEST	Migue 40'; Moha (yellow card) 57'; Dorca (yellow card) 62'	(Report); Live TV: GolT /	32' Óscar; (yellow card) 37' Bueno; (yellow card) 66' Peña; (yellow card) 85' Rueda; (yellow card) 87' Baraja	Stadium: Montilivi; Attendance: 4,205; Referee: (Navarre) Prieto Iglesias

17 September 2011 5	Real Valladolid	1–3	Real Murcia	Valladolid
16:00 CEST	Nafti (yellow card) 26'; Rueda (yellow card) 46' (yellow-red card) 87'; Guerra 85'	(Report); Live TV:	6' (o.g.) Baraja; 16' Richi; (yellow card) 18' Amaya; (yellow card) 39', (goal) 87' Iturra; (yellow card) 46' (yellow-red card) 66' Pedro; (yellow card) 64' Jorge; (yellow card) 76' Oriol	Stadium: Nuevo José Zorrilla; Attendance: 8,140; Referee: (Galicia (Spain)) Amoedo Chas

25 September 2011 6	Celta Vigo	1–1	Real Valladolid	Vigo (Pontevedra)
20:00 CEST	Insa (yellow card) 36'; Bustos (yellow card) 63'; Orellana 90+5'; López (yellow card) 90+6'	(Report); Live TV:	(yellow card) 50', (goal) 65' Guerra; (yellow card) 61' (yellow-red card) 75' Rubio; (yellow card) 70' Sisi; (yellow card) 73' Nauzet; (yellow card) 84' Baraja; (yellow card) 90+4' Valiente	Stadium: Balaídos; Attendance: 9,399; Referee: (Castilla–La Mancha) Pino Zamorano

2 October 2011 7	Real Valladolid	2–1	Elche	Valladolid
12:00 CEST	Nafti (yellow card) 50'; Sisi 54'; Nauzet (yellow card) 58'; Valiente 68'	(Report); Live TV:	(yellow card) 9' Juan Carlos; (yellow card) 13' Palanca; 44' Pelegrín; (yellow card) 57' Mantecón; (yellow card) 75' Verdés	Stadium: Nuevo José Zorrilla; Attendance: 8,890; Referee: (Community of Madrid) Lesma López

9 October 2011 8	UD Almería	1–1	Real Valladolid	Almería
20:00 CEST	García (yellow card) 30'; Corona 38'; Ulloa (yellow card) 54'; Rafita (yellow card) 67'	(Report); Live TV:	(yellow card) 37' Balenziaga; (yellow card) 76' Tekio; (yellow card) 88' Baraja; (yellow card) 88', (goal) 90+1' Guerra	Stadium: Juegos del Mediterráneo; Referee: (La Rioja) Ocón Arráiz

15 October 2011 9	Recreativo Huelva	1–1	Real Valladolid	Huelva
18:00 CEST	Sánchez 27' (pen.); Ximo (yellow card) 36'; Cifu (yellow card) 56'; Martínez (yellow card) 77'; Granero (yellow card) 89'	(Report)	(yellow card) 14' Sisi; (red card) 26' Tekio; 78' Rueda; (yellow card) 86' Manucho	Stadium: Nuevo Colombino; Attendance: 5,262; Referee: (Catalonia) Miranda Torres

22 October 2011 10	Real Valladolid	2–1	Numancia	Valladolid
16:00 CEST	Jofre 79'; Manucho 85'	(Report); Live TV:	69' (o.g.) Felipe	Stadium: Nuevo José Zorrilla; Attendance: 8,695; Referee: (Basque Country (autonomous community)) Bikandi Garrido

25 October 2011 1	Real Valladolid	2–0	Alcoyano	Valladolid
18:00 CEST	Óscar 37'; Sisi 40'; Tekio (yellow card) 69'; Rubio (yellow card) 73'	(Report); Live TV: GolT /	(yellow card) 43' (yellow-red card) 90+2' Pina; (yellow card) 87' Remón	Stadium: Nuevo José Zorrilla; Attendance: 8,200; Referee: (Andalusia) Mariscal Sánchez

29 October 2011 11	UD Las Palmas	1–0	Real Valladolid	Las Palmas de Gran Canaria
18:30 CEST; 17:30 Local time	Laguardia (yellow card) 54'; Viera 74'; García (yellow card) 74'; Guerra (yellow card) 75'; González (yellow card) 90'	(Report)	(yellow card) 50' Nafti	Stadium: Gran Canaria; Attendance: 12,143; Referee: (Extremadura) López Acera

5 November 2011 12	Real Valladolid	2–1	Xerez CD	Valladolid
16:00 CET	Nafti (yellow card) 37'; Sisi 42'; Marquitos (yellow card) 55'; Rueda (yellow card) 69'; Nauzet 76' (pen.), (yellow card) 76'; Pérez (yellow card) 83'	(Report); Live TV:	(yellow card) 25' Cámara; 70' (pen.) Rueda; (yellow card) 75' Silva	Stadium: Nuevo José Zorrilla; Referee: (Asturias) Piñeiro Crespo

12 November 2011 13	SD Huesca	2–2	Real Valladolid	Huesca
16:00 CET	Clavero (yellow card) 1'; Camacho (yellow card) 63', (goal) 65' (pen.); Bauzá 69'; Corona (yellow card) 70'; Sastre (yellow card) 89'	(Report); Live TV: Aragón TV	2' Óscar; (yellow card) 26' Sisi; 54' Guerra	Stadium: El Alcoraz; Attendance: 3,200; Referee: (Region of Murcia) José María Sánchez Martínez

19 November 2011 14	Real Valladolid	2–1	Villarreal B	Valladolid
16:00 CET	Manucho 14', 75'; Rueda (yellow card) 16'; Nafti (yellow card) 44'; Baraja (yellow card) 90+3'	(Report); Live TV:	(yellow card) 29' Costa; (yellow card) 54' Olivas; (yellow card) 58' Pere; (yellow card) 77' Castellani; (yellow card) 80' Mariño; 90+2' (o.g.) Rueda	Stadium: Nuevo José Zorrilla; Attendance: 8,003; Referee: (Castilla–La Mancha) Arcediano Monescillo

26 November 2011 15	FC Cartagena	0–0	Real Valladolid	Cartagena (Murcia)
18:00 CET		(Report); Live TV: 7RM		Stadium: Cartagonova; Attendance: 7,000; Referee: (Valencian Community) Juan Martínez Munuera

4 December 2011 16	Real Valladolid	0–0	Deportivo	Valladolid
20:30 CET	Sisi (yellow card) 17'	(Report); Live TV: Canal+ 1	(yellow card) 36' Domínguez; (yellow card) 54' Gama; (yellow card) 68' Borja; (yellow card) 80' Bergantiños	Stadium: Nuevo José Zorrilla; Attendance: 10,847; Referee: (Andalusia) Melero López

11 December 2011 17	Hércules	2–2	Real Valladolid	Alicante
12:00 CET	Aguilar 50', (yellow card) 58'; Aganzo 56'; Gomes (yellow card) 58'; Calvo (yellow card) 72'	(Report); Live TV: Canal+ 1	9', (yellow card) 73' Guerra; (yellow card) 29' Balenziaga; 39' Pérez; (yellow card) 49' (yellow-red card) 55' Nauzet; (yellow card) 72' Nafti	Stadium: Rico Pérez; Attendance: 9,454; Referee: (Andalusia) Mariscal Sánchez

17 December 2011 18	Real Valladolid	1–0	FC Barcelona B	Valladolid
16:00 CET	Óscar 55'; Pérez (yellow card) 74'	(Report); Live TV:	(yellow card) 77' Rodri; (yellow card) 88' Soriano	Stadium: Nuevo José Zorrilla; Attendance: 8,604; Referee: (Cantabria) Arias López

7 January 2012 19	CE Sabadell	1–4	Real Valladolid	Sabadell (Barcelona)
18:00 CET	Lanzarote (yellow card) 19', (goal) 69'; Ruiz (yellow card) 87'	(Report); Live TV: Esport3	13', 22', 35' Guerra; (yellow card) 71' Sisi; 73' Marquitos	Stadium: Nova Creu Alta; Attendance: 3,700; Referee: (Basque Country (autonomous community)) Bikandi Garrido

14 January 2012 20	Real Valladolid	1–1	AD Alcorcón	Valladolid
18:00 CET	Pérez 7', (yellow card) 29'; Jaime (red card) 9'; Nauzet (yellow card) 53'; Nafti (yellow card) 61'; Balenziaga (yellow card) 77'	(Report); Live TV: LaOtra	(yellow card) 38' Agus; (yellow card) 47' Quini; 73' Miguélez	Stadium: Nuevo José Zorrilla; Attendance: 8,181; Referee: (Extremadura) López Acera

21 January 2012 21	Guadalajara	0–3	Real Valladolid	Guadalajara
18:00 CET	Soria (yellow card) 60' (yellow-red card) 65'	(Report); Live TV: CMT / ETB 1	36' Óscar; (yellow card) 37' Guerra; (yellow card) 44' Peña; (yellow card) 45' Rubio; 47' Jofre; 60' (pen.) Nauzet; (yellow card) 79' Valiente	Stadium: Pedro Escartín; Attendance: 4,000; Referee: (Basque Country (autonomous community)) Ricardo de Burgos Bengoetxea

28 January 2012 22	Alcoyano	0–1	Real Valladolid	Alcoi (Alicante)
16:00 CET	Miranda (yellow card) 59'; Remón (yellow card) 66'; Wellington (yellow card) 90+4'	(Report); Live TV:	(yellow card) 37' Pérez; 79' Nauzet	Stadium: El Collao; Attendance: 3,427; Referee: (Andalusia) Melero López

5 February 2012 23	Real Valladolid	4–0	Nàstic Tarragona	Valladolid
16:00 CET	Óscar 21', 36', 44'; Guerra 80'	(Report); Live TV: GolT /	(yellow card) 13' Seoane; (yellow card) 59' Arzu	Stadium: Nuevo José Zorrilla; Attendance: 7,982; Referee: (Andalusia) Mariscal Sánchez

11 February 2012 24	Córdoba	2–0	Real Valladolid	Córdoba
18:00 CET	Patiño 33'; Prieto (yellow card) 61'; López Silva (yellow card) 67'; Borja 70'; Navarro (yellow card) 74'	(Report); Live TV: / ETB 1	(yellow card) 43' Nauzet; (yellow card) 64' Valiente	Stadium: Nuevo Arcángel; Attendance: 9,000; Referee: (Extremadura) Gil Manzano

18 February 2012 25	Real Valladolid	1–0	Girona	Valladolid
16:00 CET	Pérez 10' (pen.); Guerra (yellow card) 40'; Valiente (yellow card) 58'; Nafti (yellow card) 88'; Sisi (yellow card) 90+1'	(Report); Live TV:	(yellow card) 9' Acciari; (yellow card) 14' Goiria	Stadium: Nuevo José Zorrilla; Attendance: 8,009; Referee: (Region of Murcia) José María Sánchez Martínez

25 February 2012 26	Real Murcia	2–0	Real Valladolid	Murcia
16:00 CET	Albiol (yellow card) 26'; Sánchez 27', 54'; Oriol (yellow card) 52'	(Report); Live TV:	(yellow card) 24' Pérez; (yellow card) 32' Nafti; (yellow card) 89' Nauzet	Stadium: Nueva Condomina; Referee: (Galicia (Spain)) Amoedo Chas

3 March 2012 27	Real Valladolid	1–2	Celta Vigo	Valladolid
18:00 CET	Guerra 13'; Nafti (yellow card) 23'	(Report); Live TV: tvG2 / TVC; ETB 1 / TPA	(yellow card) 20' Lago; 31' Aspas; (yellow card) 34' Mallo; 90+2' Joan Tomas	Stadium: Nuevo José Zorrilla; Attendance: 12,880; Referee: (Andalusia) Melero López

11 March 2012 28	Elche	1–2	Real Valladolid	Elche (Alicante)
12:00 CET	Mateo (yellow card) 1'; Bille (yellow card) 36', (goal) 45+1'; Béranger (yellow card) 53'; Pelegrín (yellow card) 59'	(Report); Live TV: Canal+ 1	(yellow card) 35' Rueda; 54' Guerra; 86' Sisi; (yellow card) 90+2' Pérez	Stadium: Martínez Valero; Attendance: 13,176; Referee: (Castilla–La Mancha) Arcediano Monescillo

18 March 2012 29	Real Valladolid	1–1	UD Almería	Valladolid
12:00 CET	Pérez 19' (pen.); Rueda (yellow card) 90+2'	(Report); Live TV: Canal+ 1	(yellow card) 18' Trujillo; (yellow card) 44' Corona; 49' Ulloa; (yellow card) 59' Ortiz; (yellow card) 77' Soriano	Stadium: Nuevo José Zorrilla; Attendance: 10,757; Referee: (Canary Islands) Sureda Cuenca

25 March 2012 31	Numancia	1–4	Real Valladolid	Soria
19:45 CEST	Álvarez 52'	(Report); Live TV: GolT / C+ Liga 2	32', 60' Guerra; 37' Sisi; 41' Pérez; (yellow card) 52' Juanito	Stadium: Los Pajaritos; Attendance: 5,000; Referee: (Extremadura) López Acera

31 March 2012 32	Real Valladolid	2–1	UD Las Palmas	Valladolid
18:00 CEST	Balenziaga (yellow card) 37'; Marquitos (yellow card) 40'; Nauzet 48'; Bueno (yellow card) 83'; Óscar 90+1', (yellow card) 90+2'; Villanueva (yellow card) 90+2'; Nafti (red card) 90+4'	(Report); Live TV: TVC	(yellow card) 44' Vitolo; 61' García; (yellow card) 83' Barbosa; (yellow card) 84' Castellano	Stadium: Nuevo José Zorrilla; Attendance: 10,112; Referee: (Castilla–La Mancha) Pino Zamorano

7 April 2012 33	Xerez CD	0–4	Real Valladolid	Jerez de la Frontera (Cádiz)
16:00 CEST	Robusté (yellow card) 28'	(Report); Live TV:	14' (pen.) Pérez; 36' Óscar; 58' (pen.), (yellow card) 63' Nauzet; 65' Guerra; (yellow card) 70' Valiente; (yellow card) 74' Rubio	Stadium: Chapín; Attendance: 6,358; Referee: (Cantabria) Arias López

14 April 2012 34	Real Valladolid	3–0	SD Huesca	Valladolid
18:00 CEST	Óscar 5'; Bueno 42', 53'; Nafti (yellow card) 72'	(Report); Live TV: Aragón TV	(yellow card) 55' Omar	Stadium: Nuevo José Zorrilla; Attendance: 7,554; Referee: (Basque Country (autonomous community)) Ricardo de Burgos Bengoetxea

21 April 2012 35	Villarreal B	0–1	Real Valladolid	Vila-Real (Castellón)
21:00 CEST	Toribio (yellow card) 49'; Porcar (yellow card) 72'; Pere (yellow card) 87'	(Report); Live TV: GolT /	42' Guerra; (yellow card) 71' Nauzet; (yellow card) 78' Balenziaga	Stadium: Ciudad Deportiva Villarreal CF; Attendance: 2,000; Referee: (Andalusia) Melero López

28 April 2012 36	Real Valladolid	2–1	FC Cartagena	Valladolid
16:00 CEST	Nauzet 63' (pen.); Jofre 86', (yellow card) 86'	(Report); Live TV:	44' Paz; (red card) 62' Kijera	Stadium: Nuevo José Zorrilla; Attendance: 7,473; Referee: (Catalonia) Miranda Torres

6 May 2012 37	Deportivo	1–1	Real Valladolid	A Coruña
20:00 CEST	Guardado 24' (pen.); Morel (yellow card) 44'; Bergantiños (yellow card) 69'; Borja (yellow card) 85'; Xisco (yellow card) 87'	(Report); Live TV: Canal+ 1	(yellow card) 23' Jaime; (yellow card) 90+2' Nauzet; 90+4' Manucho	Stadium: Riazor; Attendance: 30,000; Referee: (Canary Islands) Hernández Hernández

13 May 2012 38	Real Valladolid	1–1	Hércules	Valladolid
12:00 CEST	Guerra 27', (yellow card) 57'; Nauzet (yellow card) 58'; Pérez (yellow card) 60'; Rubio (yellow card) 88'; Jofre (yellow card) 90'	(Report); Live TV: Canal+ 1	(yellow card) 50' Gilvan; (yellow card) 76' Aguilar; (yellow card) 90+1' Arbilla; (yellow card) 90+2' Aganzo; 90+5' (o.g.) Manucho	Stadium: Nuevo José Zorrilla; Attendance: 14,780; Referee: (Extremadura) Gil Manzano

16 May 2012 39	FC Barcelona B	1–2	Real Valladolid	Barcelona
22:00 CEST	Oier (yellow card) 31'; Rafinha (yellow card) 46'; Carmona 55'; Dos Santos (red card) 87'	(Report); Live TV:	(yellow card) 27' Jofre; 79' Óscar; 86' Bueno; (yellow card) 90+1' Valiente; (yellow card) 90+3' Rubio	Stadium: Miniestadi; Attendance: 500; Referee: (Balearic Islands) Sureda Cuenca

20 May 2012 40	Real Valladolid	2–0	CE Sabadell	Valladolid
21:30 CEST	Peña 36'; Bueno (yellow card) 45'; Pérez (yellow card) 85'; Sisi (yellow card) 90+1'; Nauzet 90+3'	(Report); Live TV:	(yellow card) 15' (yellow-red card) 66' Simón; (yellow card) 28' Luna	Stadium: Nuevo José Zorrilla; Attendance: 12,107; Referee: (La Rioja) Ocón Arráiz

24 May 2012 30	Real Valladolid	1–0	Recreativo Huelva	Valladolid
22:00 CEST	Guerra 47'; Sisi (yellow card) 80'	(Report); Live TV:	(yellow card) 42' J. Rubio; (yellow card) 69' Tornavaca	Stadium: Nuevo José Zorrilla; Attendance: 12,722; Referee: (Canary Islands) Hernández Hernández

27 May 2012 41	AD Alcorcón	2–2	Real Valladolid	Alcorcón (Madrid)
20:00 CEST	Borja (yellow card) 29'; Montañés 69'; Saúl 83'; Moreno (yellow card) 83'; Agus (yellow card) 88'	(Report); Live TV: Telemadrid	(yellow card) 21' Rueda; 42', 59' Nauzet; (yellow card) 83' Balenziaga; (yellow card) 83' Pérez	Stadium: Santo Domingo; Attendance: 4,500; Referee: (Castilla–La Mancha) Pino Zamorano

3 June 2012 42	Real Valladolid	1–3	Guadalajara	Valladolid
19:30 CEST	Óscar 6'; Juanito (yellow card) 58'; Nauzet (yellow card) 72'; Sisi (yellow card) 90'	(Report); Live TV:	31' Soria; 50' Cristian; (yellow card) 53' Aníbal; 59', (yellow card) 69' Fernández	Stadium: Nuevo José Zorrilla; Attendance: 13,834; Referee: (Cantabria) Arias López

==== Promotion play-off ====
Final winners will be promoted to Liga BBVA. AD Alcorcón and Hércules will play the other Semifinal.

===== Semifinal =====
6 June 2012 First leg	Córdoba	0–0	Real Valladolid	Córdoba
22:00 CEST	Caballero (yellow card) 10'; Gaspar (yellow card) 70'; Ximo (yellow card) 70'	(Report); Live TV: Canal+ 1	(yellow card) 23' Óscar; (yellow card) 37' Pérez; (yellow card) 73' Nafti; (yellow card) 87' Guerra	Stadium: Nuevo Arcángel; Attendance: 11,773; Referee: (Navarre) Prieto Iglesias

10 June 2012 Second leg	Real Valladolid	3–0	Córdoba	Valladolid
20:00 CEST	Rueda (yellow card) 25'; Óscar 50'; Guerra 64'; Sisi (yellow card) 65'; Baraja (yellow card) 84'; Jofre 86', (yellow card) 88'	(Report); Live TV: Canal+ 1	(yellow card) 4' Gaspar; (yellow card) 88' López Garai; (yellow card) 88' Alberto; (yellow card) 90+1' Dubarbier	Stadium: Nuevo José Zorrilla; Attendance: 18,064; Referee: (Aragon) Jaime Latre

Real Valladolid won 3–0 on aggregate and qualified for the Promotion play-off final.

===== Final =====
13 June 2012 First leg	AD Alcorcón	0–1	Real Valladolid	Alcorcón (Madrid)
21:00 CEST	Nagore (yellow card) 2'; Bermúdez (yellow card) 62'; M. Rueda (yellow card) 66'	(Report); Live TV: Canal+ 1 / GolT /	29' Guerra; (yellow card) 52' Peña; (yellow card) 85' Balenziaga; (yellow card) 90' Baraja	Stadium: Santo Domingo; Attendance: 4,700; Referee: (Valencian Community) Juan Martínez Munuera

16 June 2012 Second leg	Real Valladolid	1–1	AD Alcorcón	Valladolid
21:00 CEST	Guerra 52', (yellow card) 64'; Baraja (yellow card) 90'	(Report); Live TV: Canal+ 1 / GolT /	(yellow card) 16' M. Rueda; (yellow card) 34' Agus; (yellow card) 34' Riera; 45+3' Sales	Stadium: Nuevo José Zorrilla; Attendance: 26,400; Referee: (Canary Islands) Hernández Hernández

Real Valladolid won 2–1 on aggregate and got promoted to La Liga 2 years later.

=== Copa del Rey ===
==== Second qualifying round ====
8 September 2011	Real Valladolid	6–0	Nàstic Tarragona	Valladolid
20:00 CEST	Pérez 4'; Jofre 11'; Nafti (yellow card) 17'; Nauzet 22', 40', 43', 58'; Balenziaga (yellow card) 73'	(Report); Live TV: GolT		Stadium: Nuevo José Zorrilla; Attendance: 6,671; Referee: (Aragon) Jaime Latre

==== Third qualifying round ====
12 October 2011	Celta Vigo	4–1	Real Valladolid	Vigo (Pontevedra)
12:00 CEST	Català 10'; Tomás (yellow card) 26'; Toni 49'; Bermejo 69'; Aspas 78'; Navas (yellow card) 84'	(Report); Live TV: GolT	(yellow card) 44' Rubio; 82' Marquitos	Stadium: Balaídos; Attendance: 3,000; Referee: (Valencian Community) Juan Martínez Munuera

== Others ==
- Ismail Abdul Razak, with no minutes played with Real Valladolid since he arrived to the club from NSÍ Runavík, represented Balthazar in Valladolid 2012 Biblical Magi Parade.
- Manucho Contreiras did not come back to Valladolid after Christmas holiday so as to prepare the 2012 African Cup of Nations with Angola. He did not communicate to the club, and he was penalized.
- After some controversial statements about his performance, conditioned on the debts and his non-payment condition, Saná Camará was removed from the squad considering his inappropriate behavior. Miroslav Đukić even said at a press conference that "the team will remove Saná". He denounced the club to FIFA and lived the last months of the season retired in Porto (Portugal).
