= Maxi Gómez =

Uruguayan footballer (born 1996)

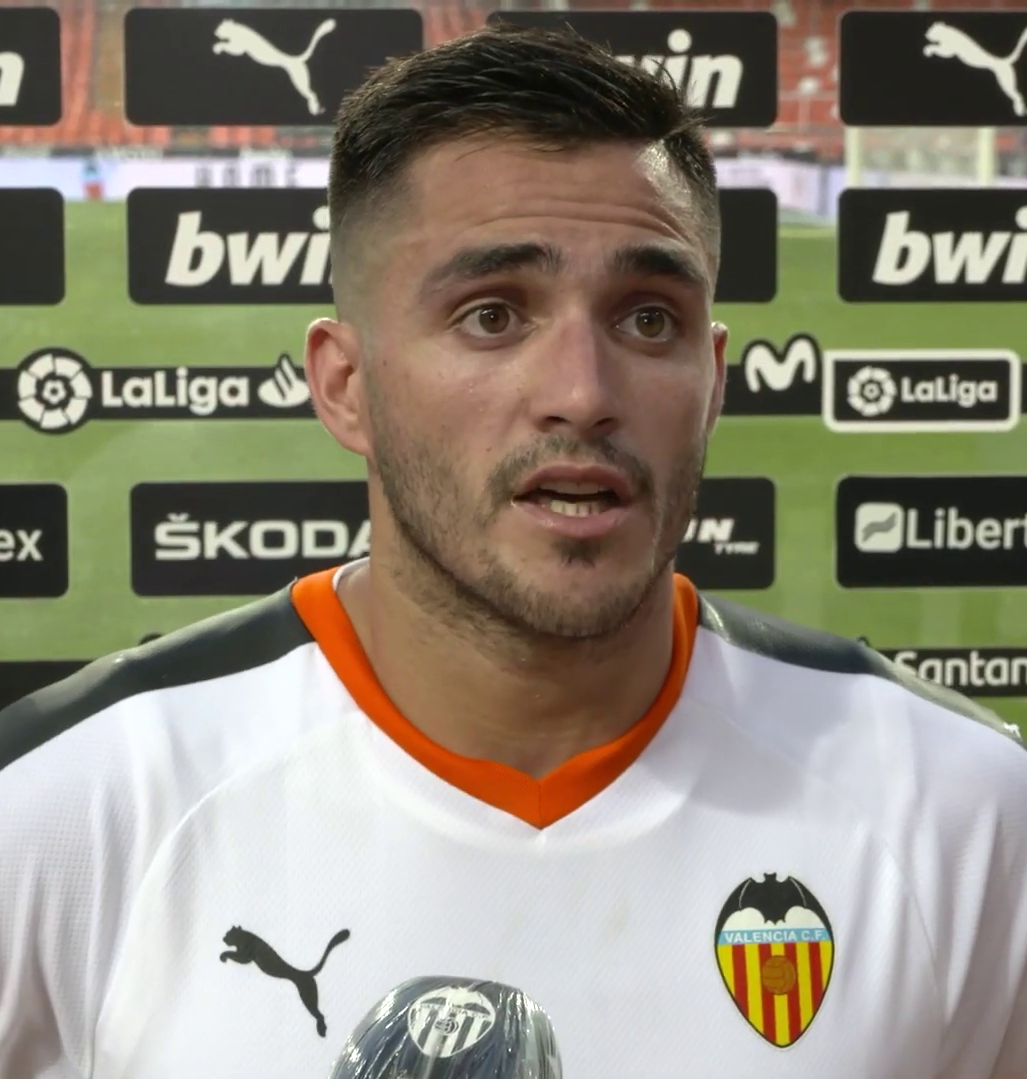
- Gómez with Valencia in 2020

Personal information
- Full name: Maximiliano Gómez González
- Date of birth: 14 August 1996 (age 30)
- Place of birth: Paysandú, Uruguay
- Height: 1.86 m (6 ft 1 in)
- Position: Forward

Team information
- Current team: Nacional
- Number: 9

Youth career
- Litoral
- 2013–2015: Defensor Sporting

Senior career*
Years	Team	Apps	(Gls)
2015–2017	Defensor Sporting	47	(28)
2017–2019	Celta	71	(30)
2019–2022	Valencia	96	(22)
2022–2024	Trabzonspor	27	(5)
2023–2024	→ Cádiz (loan)	31	(0)
2025	Defensor Sporting	14	(3)
2025–	Nacional	26	(16)

International career
2017–2023	Uruguay	32	(4)
- * Club domestic league appearances and goals as of 20 April 2026

Maximiliano "Maxi" Gómez González (Spanish pronunciation: [ˈmaksi ˈɣomes]; born 14 August 1996) is a Uruguayan professional footballer who plays as a forward for Liga AUF Uruguaya club Nacional.

Having begun his career with Defensor Sporting, he moved to Spain in 2017, where he made 198 La Liga appearances and scored 52 goals for Celta, Valencia and Cádiz.

A full international for Uruguay since 2017, Gómez was selected for the FIFA World Cup in 2018 and 2022 and the Copa América in 2019 and 2021.

== Club career ==
=== Defensor Sporting ===
Born in Paysandú, Gómez joined Defensor Sporting's youth setup in 2013, from CA Litoral. He made his first team debut on 15 September 2015, coming on as a late substitute for Héctor Acuña in a 1–0 away win against Universitario for the year's Copa Sudamericana.

Gómez made his Primera División debut on 4 October 2015, but in a 0–4 away loss against Nacional. His first senior goal came on 16 October, the last in a 2–3 home defeat against Montevideo Wanderers.

On 31 October 2015, Gómez scored a brace in a 4–1 home routing of Juventud de Las Piedras; he repeated the feat on 20 November in a 2–2 home draw against El Tanque Sisley, and also in a 3–2 home success over Danubio the following 28 February. On 22 May 2016, he scored four goals in a 6–5 away win against El Tanque Sisley, and finished his first season with 14 goals in only 21 matches.

After only four goals in 14 matches in the 2016 campaign, Gómez contributed with ten goals in 12 matches in 2017; highlights included a brace in a 2–0 away win against Danubio on 5 March 2017.

=== Celta ===
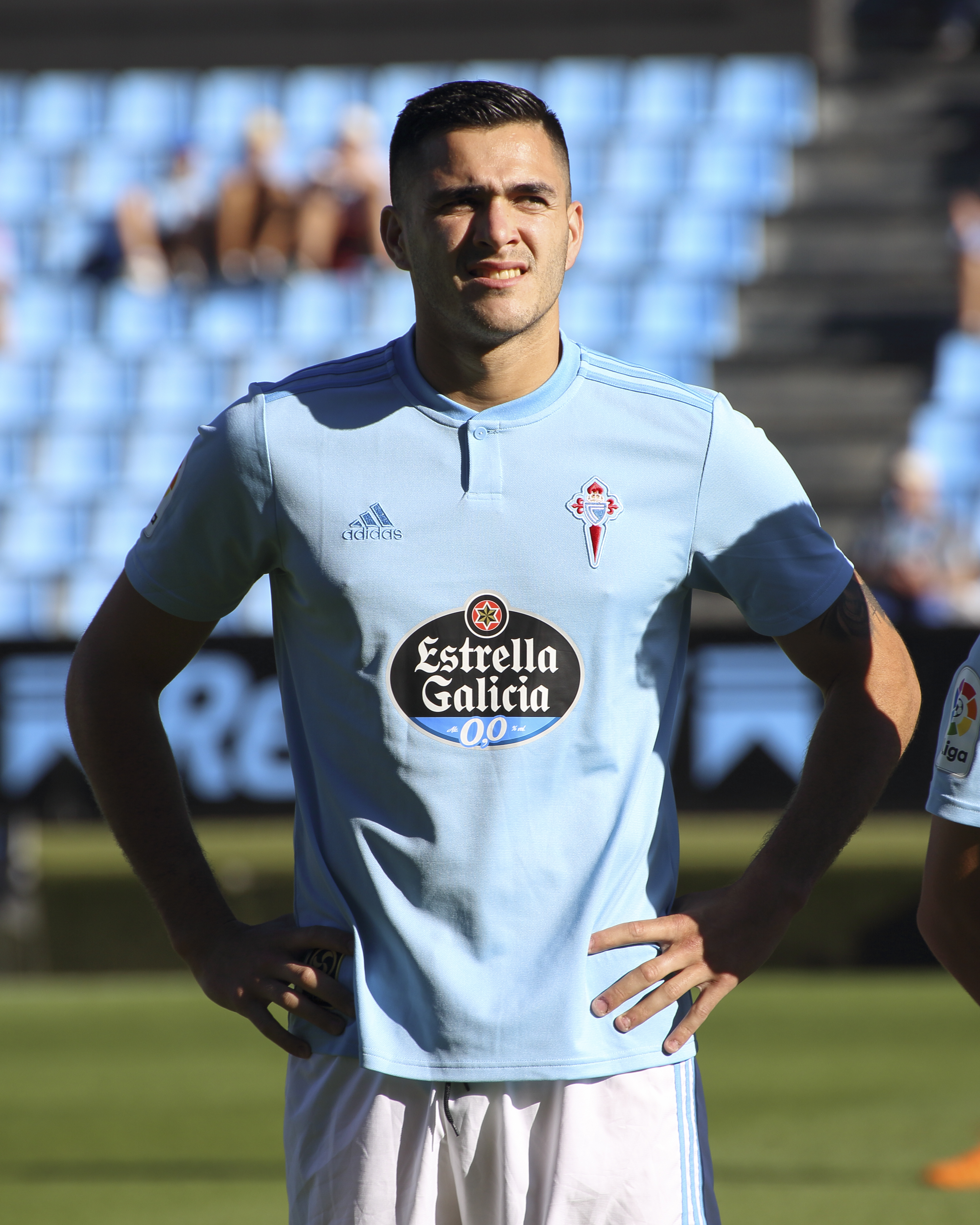
Gómez with Celta in 2018

In May 2017, Gómez signed a five-year deal with La Liga side Celta Vigo, moving abroad for the first time in his career. He made his debut for the club on 19 August, starting and scoring a brace in a 2–3 home loss against Real Sociedad, and finished his debut season with 17 goals from 36 games, seventh highest in the division.

Gómez contributed 13 goals in 2018–19 as Celta finished one place above relegation. This included one on the final day, as they defeated newly crowned champions FC Barcelona 2–0 at Balaídos.

=== Valencia ===
On 14 July 2019, Gómez signed a contract with Valencia CF until 2024, with his release clause set at €140 million. The deal saw Valencia pay €14.5 million with Santi Mina and Jorge Sáenz moving in the opposite direction, the latter joining Celta on a two-year loan deal. He made his debut on 24 August away to his former club, playing the first hour of a 1–0 loss before being replaced by Rodrigo.

Gómez scored his first goal for the Che on 14 September, coming off the bench to net at the end of a 5–2 loss to Barcelona at the Camp Nou. Against the same opponents on 25 January 2020, he scored both goals in a 2–0 victory at Mestalla, preserving his team's unbeaten home season and inflicting a first defeat of Quique Setién's spell in charge of the opponents.

In 2021–22, Gómez was sent off twice against Athletic Bilbao, once for two yellow cards in a league match and the latter on 10 February in a Copa del Rey semi-final first leg away at the San Mamés Stadium. In the second instance, he was an unused substitute and was given a straight red card at half time for threatening the assistant referee. He was issued with a two-match suspension and thereby missed the final, which his team lost on penalties to Real Betis.

=== Trabzonspor ===
In the summer of 2022, Valencia sought to sell Gómez due to UEFA Financial Fair Play Regulations and to free up a spot on their quota of non-European Union players. He was linked to a move to Fenerbahçe SK, whose sporting director came to negotiate in Spain, but signed a three-year deal with the option of a fourth at fellow Turkish Süper Lig team Trabzonspor on 31 August. The fee was €3 million and his annual salary was set at €1.75 million.

On 6 October 2022, Gómez was sent off after 11 minutes of a 3–1 loss at AS Monaco FC in the UEFA Europa League group stage, for a high boot into the face of Mohamed Camara.

Gómez returned to Spain and its top tier on 22 August 2023, after agreeing to a one-year loan with Cádiz CF. He played 31 games and scored no goals, as his team were relegated. In August 2024, he rescinded his contract at Trabzonspor.

=== Return to Defensor Sporting ===
After spending several months as a free agent following his departure from Trabzonspor, including playing in grassroots tournaments with his friends in Paysandú, Gómez re-joined Defensor Sporting in February 2025. He scored three goals from 14 matches before he left the club in July 2025; on his request, the club rescinded his contract.

=== Nacional ===
On 10 July 2025, Nacional announced the signing of Gómez on a contract until December 2026. The club had met his release clause of US$200,000, until it was confirmed that it only applied to foreign clubs, and so Nacional paid US$500,000 in two instalments while Defensor retained 10% of any future transfer fee.

Gómez made his debut for Nacional on 2 August, scoring once and assisting twice in a 5–2 win at home to Montevideo City Torque. His team ended the season as league champions, defeating rivals Peñarol in extra time in the final on 30 November.

On 31 July 2026, with Gómez on 26 goals from 48 games since his debut, he renewed his contract for one more year.

== International career ==
Gómez made his international debut for Uruguay on 10 November 2017 in a goalless friendly away to Poland, as a 74th-minute substitute for Giorgian De Arrascaeta. Manager Óscar Tabárez called him up for the 2018 FIFA World Cup in Russia, where he made his first competitive appearance in the final group game as an added-time replacement in a 3–0 win over the hosts in Samara.

On 26 March 2019, Gómez scored his first international goal to round off a 4–0 victory over Thailand and win the China Cup. He was called up for the Copa América in 2019 and 2021, both in Brazil.

Gómez scored once in 2022 FIFA World Cup qualification, coming on with three minutes remaining against Chile on 8 October 2020 and scoring the winner in a 2–1 victory. He was called up for the final tournament in Qatar, playing two games as a substitute for Darwin Núñez in a group stage elimination.

== Personal life ==
Gómez's older brother Richard, also a footballer, played in Uruguay for Club Atlético Platense. He played for Galician amateurs Mondariz FC while Maxi Gómez was at Celta.

== Career statistics ==
=== Club ===
As of match played 22 May 2023

Appearances and goals by club, season and competition
Club	Season	League			National cup (Note: Includes Copa del Rey, Turkish Cup)		Continental		Other		Total	
Club	Season	Division	Apps	Goals	Apps	Goals	Apps	Goals	Apps	Goals	Apps	Goals
Defensor Sporting	2015–16	Uruguayan Primera División	21	14	—		4 (Note: Appearance(s) in Copa Sudamericana)	0	—		25	14
Defensor Sporting	2016	Uruguayan Primera División	14	4	—		0	0	—		14	4
Defensor Sporting	2017	Uruguayan Primera División	12	10	—		1	1	—		13	11
Defensor Sporting	Total		47	28	—		5	1	—		52	29
Celta Vigo	2017–18	La Liga	36	17	3	0	—		—		39	17
Celta Vigo	2018–19	La Liga	35	13	1	0	—		—		36	13
Celta Vigo	Total		71	30	4	0	—		—		75	30
Valencia	2019–20	La Liga	33	10	3	1	6 (Note: Appearance(s) in UEFA Champions League)	0	1 (Note: Appearance(s) in Supercopa de España)	0	43	11
Valencia	2020–21	La Liga	31	7	0	0	—		—		31	7
Valencia	2021–22	La Liga	29	5	3	0	—		—		32	5
Valencia	2022–23	La Liga	3	0	—		—		—		3	0
Valencia	Total		96	22	6	1	6	0	1	0	109	23
Trabzonspor	2022–23	Süper Lig	26	5	3	1	5 (Note: Three appearances, one goal in UEFA Europa League; two appearances in UEFA Europa Conference League)	1	—		34	7
Career total			236	83	13	2	16	2	1	0	266	87

=== International ===
As of match played 8 September 2023

Appearances and goals by national team and year
National team	Year	Apps	Goals
Uruguay	2017	2	0
Uruguay	2018	7	0
Uruguay	2019	8	2
Uruguay	2020	2	1
Uruguay	2021	3	0
Uruguay	2022	7	1
Uruguay	2023	3	0
Total		32	4

Scores and results list Uruguay's goal tally first, score column indicates score after each Gómez goal.

List of international goals scored by Maxi Gómez
No.	Date	Venue	Opponent	Score	Result	Competition
1	25 March 2019	Guangxi Sports Center, Nanning, China	Thailand	4–0	4–0	2019 China Cup
2	7 June 2019	Estadio Centenario, Montevideo, Uruguay	Panama	1–0	3–0	Friendly
3	8 October 2020	Estadio Centenario, Montevideo, Uruguay	Chile	2–1	2–1	2022 FIFA World Cup qualification
4	11 June 2022	Estadio Centenario, Montevideo, Uruguay	Panama	4–0	5–0	Friendly

== Honours ==
Nacional

- Liga AUF Uruguaya: 2025
