= 2022 FIFA World Cup qualification (CONMEBOL) =

Tournament details
- Dates: 8 October 2020 – 29 March 2022
- Teams: 10 (from 1 confederation)

Tournament statistics
- Matches played: 89
- Goals scored: 223 (2.51 per match)
- Attendance: 1,369,058 (15,383 per match)
- Top scorer(s): (Bolivia) Marcelo Moreno (10 goals)

The South American section of the 2022 FIFA World Cup qualification acted as qualifiers for the 2022 FIFA World Cup held in Qatar, for national teams which were members of the South American Football Confederation (CONMEBOL). A total of 4.5 slots (4 direct slots and 1 inter-confederation play-off slot) in the final tournament were available for CONMEBOL teams.

The qualification process began on 8 October 2020 and ended on 29 March 2022. Uruguay's Luis Suárez scored the first goal of the round-robin. This was the third time Suárez had opened scoring in the group (after 2010 and 2014), as well as the fourth consecutive time a Uruguayan player had done so (Martín Cáceres scored the first goal of the 2018 process).

== Format ==
On 24 January 2019, the CONMEBOL Council decided to maintain the same qualification structure used for the previous six tournaments. The ten teams play in a league of home-and-away round-robin matches.

The fixtures were determined by a draw which was held on 17 December 2019, 10:00 PYST (UTC−3), at the Bourbon Asunción Convention Hotel in Luque, Paraguay.

Originally, Brazil and Argentina were both to be drawn into either position 4 or 5 in the draw, thus ensuring that no team has to play both of them on any double matchday. However, the decision was later reversed on 16 November 2019 by the CONMEBOL Council, making the draw completely open.

The CONMEBOL Council approved the use of the video assistant referee system for the qualifiers.

== Entrants ==
All 10 national teams from CONMEBOL entered qualification.

Note: Bolded teams qualified for the World Cup. Peru advanced to the inter-confederation play-offs.

Draw position	Team	September 2020 FIFA World Rankings
1	**Uruguay**	6
2	Colombia	10
3	Peru	22
4	**Brazil**	3
5	Venezuela	25
6	Bolivia	75
7	Paraguay	40
8	**Argentina**	9
9	Chile	17
10	**Ecuador**	64

== Schedule ==
The qualifying matches are played on dates that fall within the FIFA International Match Calendar. There are a total of 18 matchdays. Originally eight matchdays would be in 2020 and ten would be in 2021.

On 12 March 2020, FIFA announced that matches on matchdays 1–2 due to take place in March 2020 were postponed due to the COVID-19 pandemic, with the new dates to be confirmed.

On 25 June 2020, FIFA announced that the inter-confederation play-offs, originally scheduled to be played in March 2022, were moved to June 2022.

On 10 July 2020, FIFA announced that the CONMEBOL qualifiers in September 2020 were postponed, with the qualifiers starting in October 2020. CONMEBOL also requested FIFA to include a replacement international window in January 2022 in order to complete the qualifiers in March 2022. The proposal was approved by FIFA on 18 August 2020. On 6 March 2021, FIFA announced that the March 2021 matches (matchdays 5 and 6) were postponed due to travel and quarantine restrictions caused by the COVID-19 pandemic. These matches were rescheduled to be played in September and October 2021 after FIFA accepted the CONMEBOL's request to allow triple matchdays in both September and October international windows. Matchday 5 was played between matchdays 11 and 12, while matchday 6 was played between matchdays 9 and 10.

Matchday	Date(s)			Matches
Matchday	Revised	Previous date	Original	Matches
Matchday 1	8–9 October 2020	—N/a	26 March 2020	1 v 9, 2 v 5, 4 v 6, 7 v 3, 8 v 10
Matchday 2	13 October 2020	—N/a	31 March 2020	3 v 4, 5 v 7, 6 v 8, 9 v 2, 10 v 1
Matchday 3	12–13 November 2020	—N/a	3 September 2020	2 v 1, 4 v 5, 6 v 10, 8 v 7, 9 v 3
Matchday 4	17 November 2020	—N/a	8 September 2020	1 v 4, 3 v 8, 5 v 9, 7 v 6, 10 v 2
Matchday 7	3–4 June 2021	—N/a	12 November 2020	1 v 7, 3 v 2, 4 v 10, 6 v 5, 8 v 9
Matchday 8	8 June 2021	—N/a	17 November 2020	2 v 8, 5 v 1, 7 v 4, 9 v 6, 10 v 3
Matchday 9	2 September 2021	—N/a	25 March 2021	3 v 1, 5 v 8, 6 v 2, 9 v 4, 10 v 7
Matchday 6	5 September 2021	30 March 2021	13 October 2020	1 v 6, 3 v 5, 4 v 8, 7 v 2, 10 v 9
Matchday 10	9 September 2021	7 September 2021	30 March 2021	1 v 10, 2 v 9, 4 v 3, 7 v 5, 8 v 6
Matchday 11	7 October 2021	—N/a	3 June 2021	1 v 2, 3 v 9, 5 v 4, 7 v 8, 10 v 6
Matchday 5	10 October 2021	25–26 March 2021	8 October 2020	2 v 4, 5 v 10, 6 v 3, 8 v 1, 9 v 7
Matchday 12	14 October 2021	12 October 2021	8 June 2021	2 v 10, 4 v 1, 6 v 7, 8 v 3, 9 v 5
Matchday 13	11 November 2021	—N/a	2 September 2021	1 v 8, 3 v 6, 4 v 2, 7 v 9, 10 v 5
Matchday 14	16 November 2021	—N/a	7 September 2021	2 v 7, 5 v 3, 6 v 1, 8 v 4, 9 v 10
Matchday 15	27–28 January 2022	—N/a	7 October 2021	2 v 3, 5 v 6, 7 v 1, 9 v 8, 10 v 4
Matchday 16	1 February 2022	—N/a	12 October 2021	1 v 5, 3 v 10, 4 v 7, 6 v 9, 8 v 2
Matchday 17	24–25 March 2022	—N/a	11 November 2021	1 v 3, 2 v 6, 4 v 9, 7 v 10, 8 v 5
Matchday 18	29 March 2022	—N/a	16 November 2021	3 v 7, 5 v 2, 6 v 4, 9 v 1, 10 v 8
Replay from matchday 6	21 September 2022	—N/a	—N/a	4 v 8

== Standings ==
Pos	Team	Pld	W	D	L	GF	GA	GD	Pts	Qualification	Brazil	Argentina	Uruguay	Ecuador		Colombia	Chile	Paraguay		Venezuela
1	Brazil	17	14	3	0	40	5	+35	45	2022 FIFA World Cup	—	Canc. (Note: The match on 5 September 2021 was suspended after five minutes at 0–0, after Argentina walked off because Brazilian health officials entered the pitch demanding the isolation of four Argentine players accused of violating the COVID quarantine rules. It was scheduled to be replayed on 21 September 2022, but was eventually cancelled, with both teams already qualified.)	4–1	2–0	2–0	1–0	4–0	4–0	5–0	1–0
2	Argentina	17	11	6	0	27	8	+19	39	2022 FIFA World Cup	0–0	—	3–0	1–0	1–0	1–0	1–1	1–1	3–0	3–0
3	Uruguay	18	8	4	6	22	22	0	28	2022 FIFA World Cup	0–2	0–1	—	1–0	1–0	0–0	2–1	0–0	4–2	4–1
4	Ecuador	18	7	5	6	27	19	+8	26	2022 FIFA World Cup	1–1	1–1	4–2	—	1–2	6–1	0–0	2–0	3–0	1–0
5	Peru	18	7	3	8	19	22	−3	24	Inter-confederation play-offs	2–4	0–2	1–1	1–1	—	0–3	2–0	2–0	3–0	1–0
6	Colombia	18	5	8	5	20	19	+1	23		0–0	2–2	0–3	0–0	0–1	—	3–1	0–0	3–0	3–0
7	Chile	18	5	4	9	19	26	−7	19		0–1	1–2	0–2	0–2	2–0	2–2	—	2–0	1–1	3–0
8	Paraguay	18	3	7	8	12	26	−14	16		0–2	0–0	0–1	3–1	2–2	1–1	0–1	—	2–2	2–1
9	Bolivia	18	4	3	11	23	42	−19	15		0–4	1–2	3–0	2–3	1–0	1–1	2–3	4–0	—	3–1
10	Venezuela	18	3	1	14	14	34	−20	10		1–3	1–3	0–0	2–1	1–2	0–1	2–1	0–1	4–1	—

Source: FIFA, CONMEBOL
Rules for classification: Qualification tiebreakers

== Matches ==
=== Matchday 1 ===
8 October 2020
19:30 UTC−3

Paraguay	2–2	Peru
Á. Romero 66', 81'	Report (FIFA); Report (CONMEBOL)	Carrillo 52', 85'

Estadio Defensores del Chaco, Asunción
Attendance: 0
Referee: Néstor Pitana (Argentina)

8 October 2020
19:45 UTC−3

Uruguay	2–1	Chile
L. Suárez 39' (pen.); Gómez 90+3'	Report (FIFA); Report (CONMEBOL)	Sánchez 54'

Estadio Centenario, Montevideo
Attendance: 0
Referee: Éber Aquino (Paraguay)

8 October 2020
21:30 UTC−3

Argentina	1–0	Ecuador
Messi 13' (pen.)	Report (FIFA); Report (CONMEBOL)

Estadio Alberto J. Armando, Buenos Aires
Attendance: 0
Referee: Roberto Tobar (Chile)

9 October 2020
18:30 UTC−5

Colombia	3–0	Venezuela
Zapata 16'; Muriel 26', 45+3'	Report (FIFA); Report (CONMEBOL)

Estadio Metropolitano Roberto Meléndez, Barranquilla
Attendance: 0
Referee: Guillermo Guerrero (Ecuador)

9 October 2020
21:30 UTC−3

Brazil	5–0	Bolivia
Marquinhos 16'; Firmino 30', 49'; Carrasco 66' (o.g.); Coutinho 73'	Report (FIFA); Report (CONMEBOL)

Neo Química Arena, São Paulo
Attendance: 0
Referee: Leodán González (Uruguay)

=== Matchday 2 ===
13 October 2020
16:00 UTC−4

Bolivia	1–2	Argentina
Moreno 24'	Report (FIFA); Report (CONMEBOL)	La. Martínez 45'; J. Correa 79'

Estadio Hernando Siles, La Paz
Attendance: 0
Referee: Diego Haro (Peru)

13 October 2020
16:00 UTC−5

Ecuador	4–2	Uruguay
M. Caicedo 14'; Estrada 45+3', 52'; Plata 75'	Report (FIFA); Report (CONMEBOL)	L. Suárez 83' (pen.), 90+5' (pen.)

Estadio Rodrigo Paz Delgado, Quito
Attendance: 0
Referee: Wilmar Roldán (Colombia)

13 October 2020
18:00 UTC−4

Venezuela	0–1	Paraguay
	Report (FIFA); Report (CONMEBOL)	Giménez 85'

Estadio Metropolitano de Mérida, Mérida
Attendance: 0
Referee: Andrés Rojas (Colombia)

13 October 2020
19:00 UTC−5 (Note: The Peru v Brazil match was originally scheduled on 13 October 2020, 21:15 local time, but was rescheduled to 19:00 local time since Peru had a curfew which begins at 23:00 as a preventive measure against the COVID-19 pandemic.)

Peru	2–4	Brazil
Carrillo 5'; Tapia 59'	Report (FIFA); Report (CONMEBOL)	Neymar 28' (pen.), 83' (pen.), 90+4'; Richarlison 64'

Estadio Nacional, Lima
Attendance: 0
Referee: Julio Bascuñán (Chile)

13 October 2020
21:30 UTC−3 (Note: The Chile v Colombia match was originally scheduled on 13 October 2020, 20:00 local time, but was rescheduled to 21:30 local to avoid a clash with a scheduled political broadcast in Chile about a constitutional plebiscite.)

Chile	2–2	Colombia
Vidal 37' (pen.); Sánchez 41'	Report (FIFA); Report (CONMEBOL)	Lerma 6'; Falcao 90+1'

Estadio Nacional Julio Martínez Prádanos, Santiago
Attendance: 0
Referee: Darío Herrera (Argentina)

=== Matchday 3 ===
12 November 2020
16:00 UTC−4

Bolivia	2–3	Ecuador
Arce 37'; Moreno 60'	Report (FIFA); Report (CONMEBOL)	B. Caicedo 46'; Mena 55'; Gruezo 88' (pen.)

Estadio Hernando Siles, La Paz
Attendance: 0
Referee: Wilton Sampaio (Brazil)

12 November 2020
21:00 UTC−3

Argentina	1–1	Paraguay
González 41'	Report (FIFA); Report (CONMEBOL)	Á. Romero 21' (pen.)

Estadio Alberto J. Armando, Buenos Aires
Attendance: 0
Referee: Raphael Claus (Brazil)

13 November 2020
15:30 UTC−5

Colombia	0–3	Uruguay
	Report (FIFA); Report (CONMEBOL)	Cavani 5'; L. Suárez 54' (pen.); Núñez 73'

Estadio Metropolitano Roberto Meléndez, Barranquilla
Attendance: 0
Referee: Fernando Rapallini (Argentina)

13 November 2020
20:00 UTC−3

Chile	2–0	Peru
Vidal 19', 34'	Report (FIFA); Report (CONMEBOL)

Estadio Nacional Julio Martínez Prádanos, Santiago
Attendance: 0
Referee: Esteban Ostojich (Uruguay)

13 November 2020
21:30 UTC−3

Brazil	1–0	Venezuela
Firmino 66'	Report (FIFA); Report (CONMEBOL)

Estádio do Morumbi, São Paulo
Attendance: 0
Referee: Juan Gabriel Benítez (Paraguay)

=== Matchday 4 ===
17 November 2020
17:00 UTC−4

Venezuela	2–1	Chile
Mago 9'; Rondón 81'	Report (FIFA); Report (CONMEBOL)	Vidal 15'

Estadio Olímpico de la UCV, Caracas
Attendance: 0
Referee: Patricio Loustau (Argentina)

17 November 2020
16:00 UTC−5

Ecuador	6–1	Colombia
Arboleda 7'; Mena 9'; Estrada 32'; Arreaga 39'; Plata 78'; Estupiñán 90+1'	Report (FIFA); Report (CONMEBOL)	Rodríguez 45+1' (pen.)

Estadio Rodrigo Paz Delgado, Quito
Attendance: 0
Referee: Jesús Valenzuela (Venezuela)

17 November 2020
20:00 UTC−3

Uruguay	0–2	Brazil
	Report (FIFA); Report (CONMEBOL)	Arthur 33'; Richarlison 45'

Estadio Centenario, Montevideo
Attendance: 0
Referee: Roberto Tobar (Chile)

17 November 2020
20:00 UTC−3

Paraguay	2–2	Bolivia
Á. Romero 19' (pen.); Kaku 72'	Report (FIFA); Report (CONMEBOL)	Moreno 41'; Céspedes 45'

Estadio Defensores del Chaco, Asunción
Attendance: 0
Referee: Alexis Herrera (Venezuela)

17 November 2020
19:30 UTC−5

Peru	0–2	Argentina
	Report (FIFA); Report (CONMEBOL)	González 17'; La. Martínez 28'

Estadio Nacional, Lima
Attendance: 0
Referee: Wilmar Roldán (Colombia)

=== Matchday 7 ===
3 June 2021
16:00 UTC−4

Bolivia	3–1	Venezuela
Moreno 5', 83'; Di. Bejarano 60'	Report (FIFA); Report (CONMEBOL)	Chancellor 26'

Estadio Hernando Siles, La Paz
Attendance: 0
Referee: Jhon Ospina (Colombia)

3 June 2021
19:00 UTC−3

Uruguay	0–0	Paraguay
	Report (FIFA); Report (CONMEBOL)

Estadio Centenario, Montevideo
Attendance: 0
Referee: Wilmar Roldán (Colombia)

3 June 2021
21:00 UTC−3

Argentina	1–1	Chile
Messi 23' (pen.)	Report (FIFA); Report (CONMEBOL)	Sánchez 36'

Estadio Único Madre de Ciudades, Santiago del Estero
Attendance: 0
Referee: Jesús Valenzuela (Venezuela)

3 June 2021
21:00 UTC−5 (Note: The Peru v Colombia match was originally scheduled on 3 June 2021, 20:00 local time, but was rescheduled to 21:00 local time due to broadcast matters.)

Peru	0–3	Colombia
	Report (FIFA); Report (CONMEBOL)	Mina 40'; Uribe 49'; Díaz 55'

Estadio Nacional, Lima
Attendance: 0
Referee: Wilton Sampaio (Brazil)

4 June 2021
21:30 UTC−3

Brazil	2–0	Ecuador
Richarlison 65'; Neymar 90+4' (pen.)	Report (FIFA); Report (CONMEBOL)

Estádio Beira-Rio, Porto Alegre
Attendance: 0
Referee: Alexis Herrera (Venezuela)

=== Matchday 8 ===
8 June 2021
16:00 UTC−5

Ecuador	1–2	Peru
Plata 90+3'	Report (FIFA); Report (CONMEBOL)	Cueva 63'; Advíncula 89'

Estadio Rodrigo Paz Delgado, Quito
Attendance: 0
Referee: Esteban Ostojich (Uruguay)

8 June 2021
18:30 UTC−4

Venezuela	0–0	Uruguay
	Report (FIFA); Report (CONMEBOL)

Estadio Olímpico de la UCV, Caracas
Attendance: 0
Referee: Anderson Daronco (Brazil)

8 June 2021
18:00 UTC−5

Colombia	2–2	Argentina
Muriel 51' (pen.); Borja 90+4'	Report (FIFA); Report (CONMEBOL)	Romero 3'; Paredes 8'

Estadio Metropolitano Roberto Meléndez, Barranquilla
Attendance: 10,000
Referee: Roberto Tobar (Chile)

8 June 2021
20:30 UTC−4

Paraguay	0–2	Brazil
	Report (FIFA); Report (CONMEBOL)	Neymar 4'; Paquetá 90+3'

Estadio Defensores del Chaco, Asunción
Attendance: 0
Referee: Patricio Loustau (Argentina)

8 June 2021
21:30 UTC−4

Chile	1–1	Bolivia
Pulgar 69'	Report (FIFA); Report (CONMEBOL)	Moreno 81' (pen.)

Estadio San Carlos de Apoquindo, Santiago
Attendance: 0
Referee: Eber Aquino (Paraguay)

=== Matchday 9 ===
2 September 2021
16:00 UTC−4

Bolivia	1–1	Colombia
Saucedo 83'	Report (FIFA); Report (CONMEBOL)	Martínez 69'

Estadio Hernando Siles, La Paz
Attendance: 15,000
Referee: Alexis Herrera (Venezuela)

2 September 2021
16:00 UTC−5

Ecuador	2–0	Paraguay
Torres 88'; Estrada 90+5'	Report (FIFA); Report (CONMEBOL)

Estadio Rodrigo Paz Delgado, Quito
Attendance: 12,000
Referee: Andrés Matonte (Uruguay)

2 September 2021
20:00 UTC−4

Venezuela	1–3	Argentina
Soteldo 90+4' (pen.)	Report (FIFA); Report (CONMEBOL)	La. Martínez 45+2'; J. Correa 71'; Á. Correa 74'

Estadio Olímpico de la UCV, Caracas
Attendance: 6,000
Referee: Leodán González (Uruguay)

2 September 2021
20:00 UTC−5

Peru	1–1	Uruguay
Tapia 25'	Report (FIFA); Report (CONMEBOL)	De Arrascaeta 29'

Estadio Nacional, Lima
Attendance: 8,000
Referee: Néstor Pitana (Argentina)

2 September 2021
21:00 UTC−4

Chile	0–1	Brazil
	Report (FIFA); Report (CONMEBOL)	Ribeiro 64'

Estadio Monumental David Arellano, Santiago
Attendance: 11,000
Referee: Diego Haro (Peru)

=== Matchday 6 ===
Matchday pushed back in revised schedule and then cancelled.

5 September 2021
16:00 UTC−3

Brazil	Cancelled (Note: The match on 5 September 2021 was suspended after five minutes at 0–0, after Argentina walked off because Brazilian health officials entered the pitch demanding the isolation of four Argentine players accused of violating the COVID quarantine rules. It was initially rescheduled to 22 September 2022 at a location to be defined by the Brazilian Football Confederation, later set to 21 September, and finally cancelled by FIFA on 16 August, with both teams already having qualified.)	Argentina
	Report (FIFA); Report (CONMEBOL)

Neo Química Arena, São Paulo
Referee: Jesús Valenzuela (Venezuela)

5 September 2021
16:00 UTC−5

Ecuador	0–0	Chile
	Report (FIFA); Report (CONMEBOL)

Estadio Rodrigo Paz Delgado, Quito
Attendance: 12,000
Referee: Facundo Tello (Argentina)

5 September 2021
19:00 UTC−3

Uruguay	4–2	Bolivia
De Arrascaeta 15', 67' (pen.); Valverde 31'; Álvarez 47'	Report (FIFA); Report (CONMEBOL)	Moreno 59', 84' (pen.)

Estadio Campeón del Siglo, Montevideo
Attendance: 15,000
Referee: Eber Aquino (Paraguay)

5 September 2021
18:00 UTC−4

Paraguay	1–1	Colombia
Sanabria 40'	Report (FIFA); Report (CONMEBOL)	Cuadrado 53' (pen.)

Estadio Defensores del Chaco, Asunción
Attendance: 7,000
Referee: Raphael Claus (Brazil)

5 September 2021
20:00 UTC−5

Peru	1–0	Venezuela
Cueva 35'	Report (FIFA); Report (CONMEBOL)

Estadio Nacional, Lima
Attendance: 8,000
Referee: Luis Quiroz (Ecuador) (Note: Referee Guillermo Guerrero from Ecuador, who was originally assigned to the Peru v Venezuela match, was replaced by his countryman Luis Quiroz.)

=== Matchday 10 ===
9 September 2021
19:30 UTC−3

Uruguay	1–0	Ecuador
Pereiro 90+2'	Report (FIFA); Report (CONMEBOL)

Estadio Campeón del Siglo, Montevideo
Attendance: 15,000
Referee: Anderson Daronco (Brazil)

9 September 2021
18:30 UTC−4

Paraguay	2–1	Venezuela
D. Martínez 7'; Kaku 46'	Report (FIFA); Report (CONMEBOL)	Chancellor 90'

Estadio Defensores del Chaco, Asunción
Attendance: 5,000
Referee: Roberto Tobar (Chile)

9 September 2021
18:00 UTC−5

Colombia	3–1	Chile
Borja 19' (pen.), 20'; Díaz 74'	Report (FIFA); Report (CONMEBOL)	Meneses 56'

Estadio Metropolitano Roberto Meléndez, Barranquilla
Attendance: 23,500
Referee: Andrés Cunha (Uruguay)

9 September 2021
20:30 UTC−3

Argentina	3–0	Bolivia
Messi 14', 64', 88'	Report (FIFA); Report (CONMEBOL)

Estadio Monumental Antonio Vespucio Liberti, Buenos Aires
Attendance: 17,000
Referee: Kevin Ortega (Peru)

9 September 2021
21:30 UTC−3

Brazil	2–0	Peru
Ribeiro 15'; Neymar 40'	Report (FIFA); Report (CONMEBOL)

Arena Pernambuco, Recife
Attendance: 0
Referee: Wilmar Roldán (Colombia)

=== Matchday 11 ===
7 October 2021
20:00 UTC−3

Uruguay	0–0	Colombia
	Report (FIFA); Report (CONMEBOL)

Estadio Gran Parque Central, Montevideo
Attendance: 18,000
Referee: Jesús Valenzuela (Venezuela)

7 October 2021
20:00 UTC−3

Paraguay	0–0	Argentina
	Report (FIFA); Report (CONMEBOL)

Estadio Defensores del Chaco, Asunción
Attendance: 34,000
Referee: Anderson Daronco (Brazil)

7 October 2021
19:30 UTC−4

Venezuela	1–3	Brazil
Ramírez 11'	Report (FIFA); Report (CONMEBOL)	Marquinhos 71'; Gabriel Barbosa 85' (pen.); Antony 90+5'

Estadio Olímpico de la UCV, Caracas
Attendance: 6,000
Referee: Kevin Ortega (Peru)

7 October 2021
19:30 UTC−5

Ecuador	3–0	Bolivia
Estrada 13'; Valencia 16', 18'	Report (FIFA); Report (CONMEBOL)

Estadio Monumental Isidro Romero Carbo, Guayaquil
Attendance: 16,000
Referee: Wilmar Roldán (Colombia)

7 October 2021
20:00 UTC−5

Peru	2–0	Chile
Cueva 36'; Peña 64'	Report (FIFA); Report (CONMEBOL)

Estadio Nacional, Lima
Attendance: 8,000
Referee: Christian Ferreyra (Uruguay)

=== Matchday 5 ===
Matchday pushed back in revised schedule.

10 October 2021
16:00 UTC−4

Bolivia	1–0	Peru
R. Vaca 83'	Report (FIFA); Report (CONMEBOL)

Estadio Hernando Siles, La Paz
Attendance: 20,000
Referee: Guillermo Guerrero (Ecuador)

10 October 2021
16:30 UTC−4

Venezuela	2–1	Ecuador
Machís 45+1'; Bello 64'	Report (FIFA); Report (CONMEBOL)	Valencia 37' (pen.)

Estadio Olímpico de la UCV, Caracas
Attendance: 10,000
Referee: Andrés Cunha (Uruguay)

10 October 2021
16:00 UTC−5

Colombia	0–0	Brazil
	Report (FIFA); Report (CONMEBOL)

Estadio Metropolitano Roberto Meléndez, Barranquilla
Attendance: 35,000
Referee: Patricio Loustau (Argentina)

10 October 2021
20:30 UTC−3

Argentina	3–0	Uruguay
Messi 38'; De Paul 44'; La. Martínez 62'	Report (FIFA); Report (CONMEBOL)

Estadio Monumental Antonio Vespucio Liberti, Buenos Aires (Note: The Argentina v Uruguay match was relocated from Estadio Único Madre de Ciudades, Santiago del Estero to Estadio Monumental Antonio Vespucio Liberti, Buenos Aires, after the matchday 5 was postponed.)
Attendance: 35,000
Referee: Roberto Tobar (Chile)

10 October 2021
21:00 UTC−3

Chile	2–0	Paraguay
Brereton 69'; Isla 72'	Report (FIFA); Report (CONMEBOL)

Estadio San Carlos de Apoquindo, Santiago
Attendance: 10,800
Referee: Néstor Pitana (Argentina)

=== Matchday 12 ===
14 October 2021
16:00 UTC−4

Bolivia	4–0	Paraguay
Ramallo 21'; Villarroel 53'; Ábrego 84'; Fernández 90+4'	Report (FIFA); Report (CONMEBOL)

Estadio Hernando Siles, La Paz
Attendance: 12,000
Referee: Andrés Matonte (Uruguay)

14 October 2021
16:00 UTC−5

Colombia	0–0	Ecuador
	Report (FIFA); Report (CONMEBOL)

Estadio Metropolitano Roberto Meléndez, Barranquilla
Attendance: 35,000
Referee: Diego Haro (Peru)

14 October 2021
20:30 UTC−3

Argentina	1–0	Peru
La. Martínez 43'	Report (FIFA); Report (CONMEBOL)

Estadio Monumental Antonio Vespucio Liberti, Buenos Aires
Attendance: 36,000
Referee: Wilton Sampaio (Brazil)

14 October 2021
21:00 UTC−3

Chile	3–0	Venezuela
Pulgar 18', 37'; Brereton 73'	Report (FIFA); Report (CONMEBOL)

Estadio San Carlos de Apoquindo, Santiago
Attendance: 10,000
Referee: Raphael Claus (Brazil)

14 October 2021
20:30 UTC−4

Brazil	4–1	Uruguay
Neymar 10'; Raphinha 18', 58'; Gabriel Barbosa 83'	Report (FIFA); Report (CONMEBOL)	L. Suárez 77'

Arena da Amazônia, Manaus
Attendance: 12,500
Referee: Fernando Rapallini (Argentina)

=== Matchday 13 ===
11 November 2021
16:00 UTC−5

Ecuador	1–0	Venezuela
Hincapié 41'	Report (FIFA); Report (CONMEBOL)

Estadio Rodrigo Paz Delgado, Quito
Attendance: 25,000
Referee: Christian Ferreyra (Uruguay)

11 November 2021
20:00 UTC−3

Paraguay	0–1	Chile
	Report (FIFA); Report (CONMEBOL)	Sánchez 56'

Estadio Defensores del Chaco, Asunción
Attendance: 42,354
Referee: Patricio Loustau (Argentina)

11 November 2021
21:30 UTC−3

Brazil	1–0	Colombia
Paquetá 72'	Report (FIFA); Report (CONMEBOL)

Neo Química Arena, São Paulo
Attendance: 22,800
Referee: Roberto Tobar (Chile)

11 November 2021
21:00 UTC−5

Peru	3–0	Bolivia
Lapadula 9'; Cueva 31'; Peña 39'	Report (FIFA); Report (CONMEBOL)

Estadio Nacional, Lima
Attendance: 10,000
Referee: Éber Aquino (Paraguay)

12 November 2021
20:00 UTC−3

Uruguay	0–1	Argentina
	Report (FIFA); Report (CONMEBOL)	Di María 7'

Estadio Campeón del Siglo, Montevideo
Attendance: 30,000
Referee: Alexis Herrera (Venezuela)

=== Matchday 14 ===
16 November 2021
16:00 UTC−4

Bolivia	3–0	Uruguay
Arce 29', 79'; Moreno 45'	Report (FIFA); Report (CONMEBOL)

Estadio Hernando Siles, La Paz
Attendance: 7,000
Referee: Wilton Sampaio (Brazil)

16 November 2021
17:00 UTC−4 (Note: The Venezuela v Peru match was originally scheduled on 16 November 2021, 19:00 local time, but was rescheduled to 17:00 local time.)

Venezuela	1–2	Peru
Machís 52'	Report (FIFA); Report (CONMEBOL)	Lapadula 18'; Cueva 65'

Estadio Olímpico de la UCV, Caracas
Attendance: 9,000
Referee: Bruno Arleu (Brazil)

16 November 2021
18:00 UTC−5

Colombia	0–0	Paraguay
	Report (FIFA); Report (CONMEBOL)

Estadio Metropolitano Roberto Meléndez, Barranquilla
Attendance: 44,000
Referee: Facundo Tello (Argentina)

16 November 2021
20:30 UTC−3

Argentina	0–0	Brazil
	Report (FIFA); Report (CONMEBOL)

Estadio San Juan del Bicentenario, San Juan
Attendance: 25,000
Referee: Andrés Cunha (Uruguay)

16 November 2021
21:15 UTC−3

Chile	0–2	Ecuador
	Report (FIFA); Report (CONMEBOL)	Estupiñán 9'; M. Caicedo 90+3'

Estadio San Carlos de Apoquindo, Santiago
Attendance: 12,000
Referee: Fernando Rapallini (Argentina)

=== Matchday 15 ===
27 January 2022
16:00 UTC−5

Ecuador	1–1	Brazil
Torres 75'	Report (FIFA); Report (CONMEBOL)	Casemiro 6'

Estadio Rodrigo Paz Delgado, Quito
Attendance: 17,992
Referee: Wilmar Roldán (Colombia)

27 January 2022
20:00 UTC−3

Paraguay	0–1	Uruguay
	Report (FIFA); Report (CONMEBOL)	L. Suárez 50'

Estadio General Pablo Rojas, Asunción
Attendance: 36,000
Referee: Darío Herrera (Argentina)

27 January 2022
21:15 UTC−3

Chile	1–2	Argentina
Brereton 21'	Report (FIFA); Report (CONMEBOL)	Di María 10'; La. Martínez 34'

Estadio Zorros del Desierto, Calama
Attendance: 8,800
Referee: Anderson Daronco (Brazil)

28 January 2022
16:00 UTC−5

Colombia	0–1	Peru
	Report (FIFA); Report (CONMEBOL)	Flores 85'

Estadio Metropolitano Roberto Meléndez, Barranquilla
Attendance: 41,000
Referee: Jesús Valenzuela (Venezuela)

28 January 2022
18:00 UTC−4

Venezuela	4–1	Bolivia
Rondón 24', 34', 67'; Machís 55'	Report (FIFA); Report (CONMEBOL)	Miranda 38'

Estadio Agustín Tovar, Barinas
Attendance: 24,000
Referee: Guillermo Guerrero (Ecuador)

=== Matchday 16 ===
1 February 2022
16:30 UTC−4 (Note: The Bolivia vs Chile match, originally scheduled at 16:00 local time, was delayed until 16:30 local time due to heavy rainfall in La Paz.)

Bolivia	2–3	Chile
Enoumba 37'; Moreno 88'	Report (FIFA); Report (CONMEBOL)	Sánchez 14', 86'; Núñez 77'

Estadio Hernando Siles, La Paz
Attendance: 28,000
Referee: Alexis Herrera (Venezuela)

1 February 2022
20:00 UTC−3

Uruguay	4–1	Venezuela
Bentancur 1'; De Arrascaeta 23'; Cavani 45+1'; L. Suárez 53' (pen.)	Report (FIFA); Report (CONMEBOL)	Jf. Martínez 65'

Estadio Centenario, Montevideo
Attendance: 55,000
Referee: Bruno Arleu (Brazil)

1 February 2022
20:30 UTC−3

Argentina	1–0	Colombia
La. Martínez 29'	Report (FIFA); Report (CONMEBOL)

Estadio Mario Alberto Kempes, Córdoba (Note: The Argentina v Colombia match was relocated from Estadio Monumental Antonio Vespucio Liberti, Buenos Aires to Estadio Mario Alberto Kempes, Córdoba.)
Attendance: 50,000
Referee: Raphael Claus (Brazil)

1 February 2022
21:30 UTC−3

Brazil	4–0	Paraguay
Raphinha 28'; Coutinho 62'; Antony 86'; Rodrygo 88'	Report (FIFA); Report (CONMEBOL)

Estádio Mineirão, Belo Horizonte
Attendance: 32,344
Referee: Facundo Tello (Argentina)

1 February 2022
21:00 UTC−5

Peru	1–1	Ecuador
Flores 69'	Report (FIFA); Report (CONMEBOL)	Estrada 2'

Estadio Nacional, Lima
Attendance: 28,000
Referee: Wilton Sampaio (Brazil)

=== Matchday 17 ===
24 March 2022
20:30 UTC−3

Uruguay	1–0	Peru
De Arrascaeta 42'	Report (FIFA); Report (CONMEBOL)

Estadio Centenario, Montevideo
Attendance: 40,000
Referee: Anderson Daronco (Brazil)

24 March 2022
18:30 UTC−5

Colombia	3–0	Bolivia
Díaz 39'; Borja 72'; Uribe 90'	Report (FIFA); Report (CONMEBOL)

Estadio Metropolitano Roberto Meléndez, Barranquilla
Attendance: 25,000
Referee: Facundo Tello (Argentina)

24 March 2022
20:30 UTC−3

Brazil	4–0	Chile
Neymar 44' (pen.); Vinícius 45+1'; Coutinho 72' (pen.); Richarlison 90+1'	Report (FIFA); Report (CONMEBOL)

Estádio do Maracanã, Rio de Janeiro (Note: The Brazil v Chile match, originally scheduled to be played at Itaipava Arena Fonte Nova, Salvador, was relocated to Estádio do Maracanã, Rio de Janeiro due to restrictions on the capacity of the stadiums in the State of Bahia due to the COVID-19 pandemic.)
Attendance: 69,368
Referee: Darío Herrera (Argentina)

24 March 2022
20:30 UTC−3

Paraguay	3–1	Ecuador
Morales 10'; Hincapié 45+6' (o.g.); Almirón 54'	Report (FIFA); Report (CONMEBOL)	J. Caicedo 85' (pen.)

Estadio Antonio Aranda, Ciudad del Este
Attendance: 10,000
Referee: Jesús Valenzuela (Venezuela)

25 March 2022
20:30 UTC−3

Argentina	3–0	Venezuela
González 34'; Di María 79'; Messi 82'	Report (FIFA); Report (CONMEBOL)

Estadio Alberto J. Armando, Buenos Aires (Note: The Argentina v Venezuela match, originally scheduled to be played at Estadio Monumental Antonio Vespucio Liberti, Buenos Aires, was relocated to Estadio Alberto J. Armando, Buenos Aires, due to renovations.)
Attendance: 42,000
Referee: Kevin Ortega (Peru)

=== Matchday 18 ===
29 March 2022
18:30 UTC−5

Peru	2–0	Paraguay
Lapadula 5'; Yotún 42'	Report (FIFA); Report (CONMEBOL)

Estadio Nacional, Lima
Attendance: 40,000
Referee: Fernando Rapallini (Argentina)

29 March 2022
19:30 UTC−4

Venezuela	0–1	Colombia
	Report (FIFA); Report (CONMEBOL)	Rodríguez 45+4' (pen.)

Polideportivo Cachamay, Ciudad Guayana
Attendance: 41,600
Referee: Wilton Sampaio (Brazil)

29 March 2022
19:30 UTC−4

Bolivia	0–4	Brazil
	Report (FIFA); Report (CONMEBOL)	Paquetá 24'; Richarlison 45', 90+1'; Bruno Guimarães 66'

Estadio Hernando Siles, La Paz
Attendance: 20,000
Referee: Eber Aquino (Paraguay)

29 March 2022
20:30 UTC−3

Chile	0–2	Uruguay
	Report (FIFA); Report (CONMEBOL)	L. Suárez 79'; Valverde 90'

Estadio San Carlos de Apoquindo, Santiago
Attendance: 11,000
Referee: Patricio Loustau (Argentina)

29 March 2022
18:30 UTC−5

Ecuador	1–1	Argentina
Valencia 90+3'	Report (FIFA); Report (CONMEBOL)	Alvarez 24'

Estadio Monumental Isidro Romero Carbo, Guayaquil
Attendance: 59,000
Referee: Raphael Claus (Brazil)

=== Replay from matchday 6 ===
21 September 2022
20:00 UTC−3

Brazil	Cancelled	Argentina
	Report (FIFA); Report (CONMEBOL)

Neo Química Arena, São Paulo

== Inter-confederation play-off ==
The inter-confederation play-offs was determined by a draw held on 26 November 2021. The fifth-placed team from CONMEBOL qualification was drawn against the AFC fourth round winners. The play-off was played as a single match in Qatar (host country of the World Cup) on 13 June 2022.

Team 1	Score	Team 2
**Australia**	0–0 (a.e.t.) (5–4 p)	Peru

== Qualified teams ==
Status of CONMEBOL countries with respect to the 2022 FIFA World Cup: Team has qualified for World Cup Team failed to qualify Team suspended Country not a CONMEBOL member

The following four teams from CONMEBOL qualified for the final tournament.

Team	Qualified as	Qualified on	Previous appearances in FIFA World Cup^{1}
Brazil	Winners	11 November 2021	21 (1930, 1934, 1938, 1950, 1954, **1958**, **1962**, 1966, **1970**, 1974, 1978, 1982, 1986, 1990, **1994**, 1998, **2002**, 2006, 2010, 2014, 2018)
Argentina	Runners-up	16 November 2021	17 (1930, 1934, 1958, 1962, 1966, 1974, **1978**, 1982, **1986**, 1990, 1994, 1998, 2002, 2006, 2010, 2014, 2018)
Uruguay	Third place	24 March 2022	13 (**1930**, **1950**, 1954, 1962, 1966, 1970, 1974, 1986, 1990, 2002, 2010, 2014, 2018)
Ecuador	Fourth place	24 March 2022	3 (2002, 2006, 2014)

^{1} Bold indicates champions for that year. Italic indicates hosts for that year.

== Goalscorers ==
There were 223 goals scored in 89 matches, for an average of 2.51 goals per match.

10 goals

- (Bolivia) Marcelo Moreno

8 goals

- (Brazil) Neymar
- (Uruguay) Luis Suárez

7 goals

- (Argentina) Lautaro Martínez
- (Argentina) Lionel Messi

6 goals

- (Brazil) Richarlison
- (Chile) Alexis Sánchez
- (Ecuador) Michael Estrada

5 goals

- (Peru) Christian Cueva
- (Uruguay) Giorgian de Arrascaeta

4 goals

- (Chile) Arturo Vidal
- (Colombia) Miguel Borja
- (Ecuador) Enner Valencia
- (Paraguay) Ángel Romero
- (Venezuela) Salomón Rondón

3 goals

- (Argentina) Ángel Di María
- (Argentina) Nicolás González
- (Bolivia) Juan Carlos Arce
- (Brazil) Philippe Coutinho
- (Brazil) Roberto Firmino
- (Brazil) Lucas Paquetá
- (Brazil) Raphinha
- (Chile) Ben Brereton
- (Chile) Erick Pulgar
- (Colombia) Luis Díaz
- (Colombia) Luis Muriel
- (Ecuador) Gonzalo Plata
- (Peru) André Carrillo
- (Peru) Gianluca Lapadula
- (Venezuela) Darwin Machís

2 goals

- (Argentina) Joaquín Correa
- (Brazil) Antony
- (Brazil) Gabriel Barbosa
- (Brazil) Marquinhos
- (Brazil) Éverton Ribeiro
- (Colombia) James Rodríguez
- (Colombia) Mateus Uribe
- (Ecuador) Moisés Caicedo
- (Ecuador) Pervis Estupiñán
- (Ecuador) Ángel Mena
- (Ecuador) Félix Torres
- (Paraguay) Kaku
- (Peru) Edison Flores
- (Peru) Sergio Peña
- (Peru) Renato Tapia
- (Uruguay) Edinson Cavani
- (Uruguay) Federico Valverde
- (Venezuela) Jhon Chancellor

1 goal

- (Argentina) Julián Alvarez
- (Argentina) Ángel Correa
- (Argentina) Rodrigo De Paul
- (Argentina) Leandro Paredes
- (Argentina) Cristian Romero
- (Bolivia) Víctor Ábrego
- (Bolivia) Diego Bejarano
- (Bolivia) Boris Céspedes
- (Bolivia) Marc Enoumba
- (Bolivia) Roberto Fernández
- (Bolivia) Bruno Miranda
- (Bolivia) Rodrigo Ramallo
- (Bolivia) Fernando Saucedo
- (Bolivia) Ramiro Vaca
- (Bolivia) Moisés Villarroel
- (Brazil) Arthur
- (Brazil) Casemiro
- (Brazil) Bruno Guimarães
- (Brazil) Rodrygo
- (Brazil) Vinícius
- (Chile) Mauricio Isla
- (Chile) Jean Meneses
- (Chile) Marcelino Núñez
- (Colombia) Juan Cuadrado
- (Colombia) Radamel Falcao
- (Colombia) Jefferson Lerma
- (Colombia) Roger Martínez
- (Colombia) Yerry Mina
- (Colombia) Duván Zapata
- (Ecuador) Robert Arboleda
- (Ecuador) Xavier Arreaga
- (Ecuador) Beder Caicedo
- (Ecuador) Jordy Caicedo
- (Ecuador) Carlos Gruezo
- (Ecuador) Piero Hincapié
- (Paraguay) Miguel Almirón
- (Paraguay) Gastón Giménez
- (Paraguay) David Martínez
- (Paraguay) Robert Morales
- (Paraguay) Antonio Sanabria
- (Peru) Luis Advíncula
- (Peru) Yoshimar Yotún
- (Uruguay) Agustín Álvarez
- (Uruguay) Rodrigo Bentancur
- (Uruguay) Maxi Gómez
- (Uruguay) Darwin Núñez
- (Uruguay) Gastón Pereiro
- (Venezuela) Eduard Bello
- (Venezuela) Luis Mago
- (Venezuela) Josef Martínez
- (Venezuela) Eric Ramírez
- (Venezuela) Yeferson Soteldo

1 own goal

- (Bolivia) José María Carrasco (against Brazil)
- (Ecuador) Piero Hincapié (against Paraguay)
