= Marc Enoumba =

Bolivian footballer (born 1993)

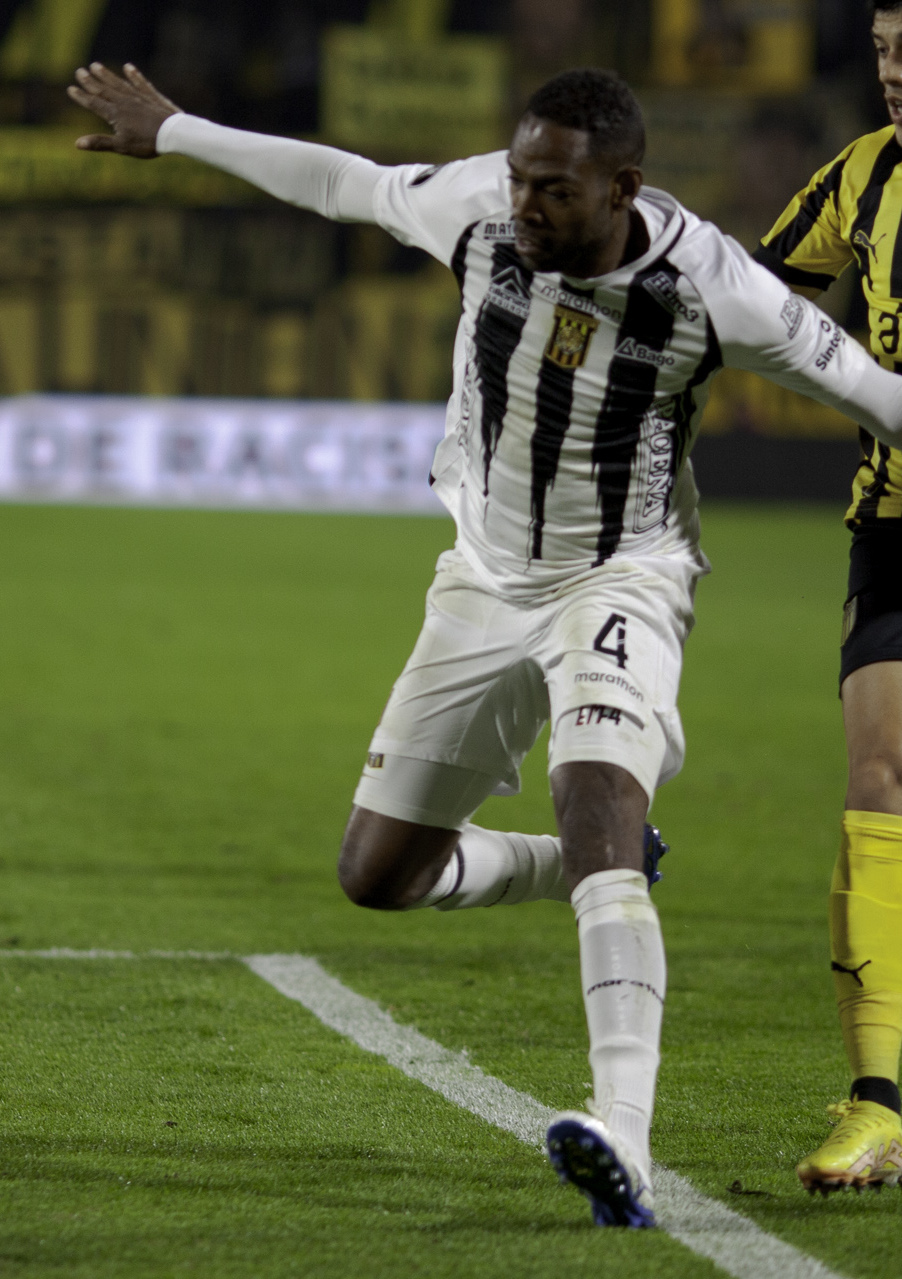

Personal information
- Full name: Marc François Enoumba
- Date of birth: 4 March 1993 (age 33)
- Place of birth: Douala, Cameroon
- Height: 1.83 m (6 ft 0 in)
- Position: Centre-back

Team information
- Current team: Blooming
- Number: 44

Senior career*
Years	Team	Apps	(Gls)
- Sanaga
2011–2014	Union Douala		
2014–2015	Njalla Quan		
2015	Dynamo Douala		
2016	Municipal Tiquipaya		
2017	Deportivo Escara		
2018–2023	Always Ready	132	(7)
2023	→ Royal Pari (loan)	10	(1)
2024	The Strongest	21	(1)
2025-	Blooming	23	(3)

International career^{‡}
2021–	Bolivia	12	(1)
- * Club domestic league appearances and goals as of 30 December 2025 ‡ National team caps and goals as of 22:04, 26 March 2024 (UTC)

Marc François Enoumba (born 4 March 1993) is a professional footballer who plays as a centre-back for Blooming. Born in Cameroon, Enoumba naturalized Bolivian and he represents the Bolivia national team since 2021.

== International career ==
Having lived in Bolivia for over 5 years, Enoumba is eligible to play for the Bolivia national team. He made his debut on 2 September 2021 in a World Cup qualifier against Colombia, a 1–1 home draw. He substituted Diego Bejarano at half-time.

=== International goals ===
No.	Date	Venue	Opponent	Score	Result	Competition
1	1 February 2022	Estadio Hernando Siles, La Paz, Bolivia	Chile	1–1	2–3	2022 FIFA World Cup qualification
