= Ismail Abdul Razak =

Ghanaian footballer (born 1989)

Abdul Razak
Personal information
- Full name: Ismail Abdul Razak
- Date of birth: 7 March 1989 (age 37)
- Place of birth: Accra, Ghana
- Height: 1.81 m (5 ft 11 in)
- Position: Centre midfielder

Youth career
- Real Sportive

Senior career*
Years	Team	Apps	(Gls)
2007–2009	Real Sportive		
2009–2010	Hapoel Acre	0	(0)
2010	Hakoah Amidar Ramat Gan	6	(0)
2011	NSÍ Runavík	9	(0)
2011–2012	Valladolid	0	(0)
- * Club domestic league appearances and goals

Ismail Abdul Razak (born 7 March 1989) is a Ghanaian footballer who plays as a centre midfielder.

== Club career ==
=== Hapoel Acre ===
He signed his first professional contract in 2009, and did it with the Israeli club Hapoel Acre, that plays at the Israeli Premier League. He was adapting to the country and to the team, and he became a regular starter. In the first season in Israel played a total of 18 games, all as a starter, scoring a total of 3 goals. The team stayed in the first level of Israeli football and played in the Israeli Premier League again in the 2010–11 season. In this second season at Hapoel Acre, Razak began to decline. He played in 14 out of 33 games that his team played, being 11 times starter. At the end of the season, Abdul Razak left Hapoel Acre and joined Faroe Islands team NSÍ Runavík.

=== NSÍ Runavík ===
Ismail Abdul Razak arrived in the Faroe Islands in 2011 to play for NSÍ Runavík in the Faroe Islands Premier League. He played 10 matches, 9 in League and 1 other in Cup, all of them as starter, but this time he did not score any goal. In the summer of 2011, the Spanish Liga Adelante team Real Valladolid asked NSÍ about the availability of the Ghanaian midfielder. In July 2011, he went to Spain to prove himself with Real Valladolid during its pre-season. After some matches, the team's staff as well as his future new manager, Miroslav Đukić, approved him and he joined Real Valladolid.

=== Real Valladolid ===
He officially joined with Real Valladolid on 22 August 2011. He signed a 3-years-contract that expires in June 2014. However, after a yearlong association with the Spanish outfit, the Ghanaian decided to rescind his contract.
