= Daniel Aquino =

Argentine footballer (born 1965)

Personal information
- Full name: Daniel Toribio Aquino Antúnez
- Date of birth: 9 June 1965 (age 61)
- Place of birth: Chajarí, Argentina
- Height: 1.75 m (5 ft 9 in)
- Position: Striker

Senior career*
Years	Team	Apps	(Gls)
1985–1989	Banfield	34	(9)
1989–1991	Murcia	84	(31)
1991–1992	Albacete	21	(3)
1992–1993	Mérida	38	(19)
1993–1995	Betis	63	(33)
1995–1996	Rayo Vallecano	40	(14)
1996–1997	Albacete	47	(18)
1998–2000	Murcia	31	(12)
2000–2001	Lorca Deportiva	27	(8)
2001–2002	Relesa Las Palas		
Total		385	(147)
- * Club domestic league appearances and goals

Daniel Toribio Aquino Antúnez (born 9 June 1965), nicknamed El Toro (bull), is an Argentine former professional footballer who played as a striker.

He spent the bulk of his career in Spain, appearing in 203 Segunda División matches over seven seasons (94 goals) in representation of four teams. His son Daniel was already born there, and played for Spain at youth level.

== Club career ==
Aquino was born in Chajarí, Entre Ríos Province. After starting his career at Club Atlético Banfield he moved to Spain in 1989, joining Real Murcia CF of Segunda División and scoring 15 goals in 33 appearances in his first season. In the 1991 winter transfer window he signed for another team in the country, Albacete Balompié, being relatively used as the Castilla–La Mancha side retained their recently acquired La Liga status (18 starts).

From 1992 to 1994, Aquino achieved two consecutive Pichichi Trophy awards in the second tier, one of them – with Real Betis – ending in promotion. After a solid top-flight campaign at Rayo Vallecano and a further one and a half at Albacete in division two, he finished his career in 2002 at the age of 37, with stints in the Segunda División B including former club Murcia, where his son Daniel was born in 1990, eventually also becoming a professional footballer.

From 2008 to 2010, Aquino coached Murcia's juniors.
