= José María Carrasco =

Bolivian footballer (born 1997)

Personal information
- Full name: José María Carrasco Sanguino
- Date of birth: 16 August 1997 (age 29)
- Place of birth: Santa Cruz de la Sierra, Bolivia
- Height: 1.85 m (6 ft 1 in)
- Position: Defender

Team information
- Current team: Blooming
- Number: 55

Youth career
- Blooming

Senior career*
| Years | Team | Apps | (Gls) |
| 2016–2022 | Blooming | 96 | (8) |
| 2021 | → Independiente del Valle (loan) | 1 | (0) |
| 2022 | → Universidad de Chile (loan) | 9 | (0) |
| 2023 | The Strongest | 8 | (0) |
| 2024 | Nacional Potosí | 4 | (0) |
| 2024–2025 | Real Tomayapo | 21 | (0) |
| 2025–2026 | Al-Ain | 10 | (0) |
| 2026- | Blooming | 0 | (0) |

International career^{‡}
| 2017 | Bolivia U20 | 3 | (0) |
| 2019– | Bolivia | 6 | (0) |
| 2020 | Bolivia U23 | 4 | (0) |
- * Club domestic league appearances and goals as of 22:11, 26 March 2024 (UTC) ‡ National team caps and goals as of 30 March 2022

José María Carrasco Sanguino (born 16 August 1997) is a Bolivian footballer who plays as a defender for Bolivian First Division club Blooming and the Bolivia national team.

== Club career ==
Carrasco started his career in Blooming. He made his Primera División debut on 8 May 2016 against Nacional Potosí, coming in as a substitute for Cristian Coimbra in the 66th minute.

In 2022 he was loaned to Universidad de Chile in the Chilean Primera División. After six months, he returned to Blooming.

On 29 September 2025, Carrasco joined Saudi Second Division League club Al-Ain.

== International career ==
Carrasco made his debut in Bolivia national under-20 football team on 21 January 2017 in the group stage of 2017 South American U-20 Championship against Peru, playing 79 minutes. He was included in Bolivia's provisional squad for 2019 Copa América released on 15 May 2019. He made his debut on 2 June 2019, in a friendly against France, as an 89th-minute substitute for Adrián Jusino.
