= Fran No =

Spanish footballer

Personal information
- Full name: Francisco No Rodríguez
- Date of birth: 3 October 1991 (age 35)
- Place of birth: Algeciras, Spain
- Height: 1.90 m (6 ft 3 in)
- Position: Centre back

Youth career
- Los Barrios
- Algeciras
- 2006–2009: Betis

Senior career*
| Years | Team | Apps | (Gls) |
| 2009–2011 | Betis B | 33 | (0) |
| 2010 | Betis | 0 | (0) |
| 2011–2015 | Valladolid B | 109 | (4) |
| 2015–2016 | Jaén | 14 | (1) |
| 2016–2017 | Somozas | 14 | (0) |
| 2017–2018 | Langreo | 12 | (0) |
| 2018–2019 | Algeciras | 0 | (0) |
- * Club domestic league appearances and goals as of 2 September 2018

Francisco "Fran" No Rodríguez (born 3 October 1991) is a Spanish footballer who plays as a central defender.

== Club career ==
Born in Algeciras, Province of Cádiz, Andalusia, No graduated from Real Betis' youth academy. He made his senior debut with the reserves in the 2009–10 season, in Segunda División B.

No played his first match as a professional on 1 September 2010, starting and playing the full 90 minutes in a 2–1 home win over UD Salamanca in the second round in the Copa del Rey. He spent the vast majority of his spell registered with the B side, however.

On 25 June 2011, No moved to another reserve team, Real Valladolid B of Tercera División. Four seasons later, he returned to his native region and signed a year-long deal at third division club Real Jaén.

On 20 July 2016, after appearing sparingly, No joined fellow league side UD Somozas. The following 12 January, he returned to the fourth tier with UP Langreo.
