= Dani Aquino =

Spanish footballer

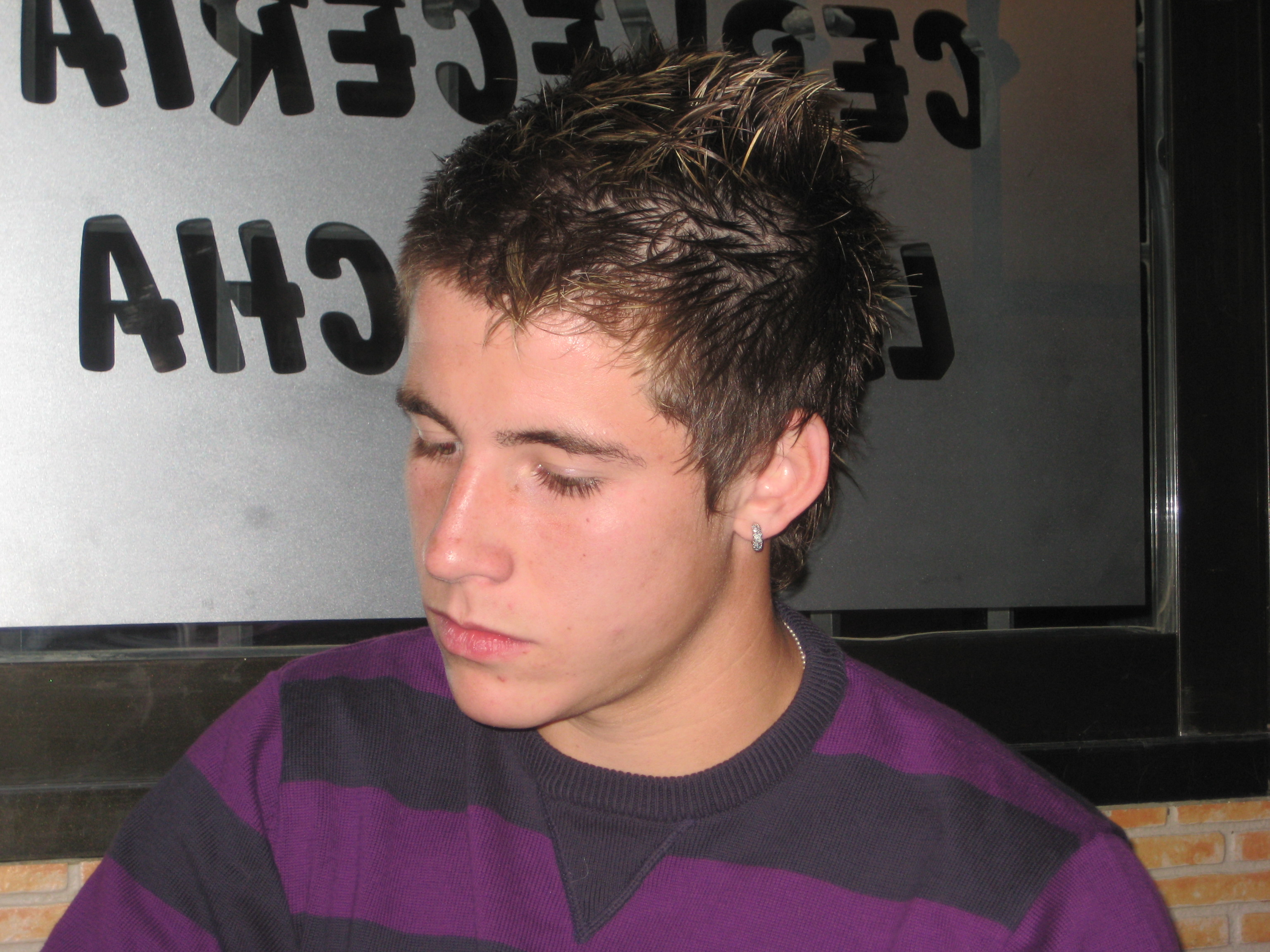

Personal information
- Full name: Daniel Aquino Pintos
- Date of birth: 27 July 1990 (age 36)
- Place of birth: Murcia, Spain
- Height: 1.74 m (5 ft 9 in)
- Positions: Winger; forward

Team information
- Current team: UCAM Murcia
- Number: 11

Youth career
- 1998–2006: Murcia

Senior career*
Years	Team	Apps	(Gls)
2006–2008	Murcia B	24	(10)
2007–2011	Murcia	73	(7)
2011–2012	Valladolid	1	(0)
2012–2013	Oviedo	12	(1)
2013	Atlético Madrid C	17	(13)
2013–2015	Atlético Madrid B	66	(27)
2013	Atlético Madrid	1	(0)
2015–2016	Numancia	28	(1)
2016–2018	Racing Santander	71	(36)
2018–2019	Murcia	17	(8)
2019	→ AEK Larnaca (loan)	12	(2)
2019	Piast Gliwice	1	(0)
2020–2022	Badajoz	53	(12)
2022–2023	Mar Menor	16	(5)
2023–2024	San Fernando	55	(13)
2024–2025	Ceuta	32	(8)
2025–	UCAM Murcia	37	(15)

International career
2007	Spain U17	12	(4)
2007–2009	Spain U19	15	(5)
Medal record
Men's football
Representing Spain
U-17 World Cup
Runner-up	2007 Korea
European U-17 Championship
Winner	2007 Belgium
- * Club domestic league appearances and goals as of 22:23, 5 October 2026 (UTC)

Daniel "Dani" Aquino Pintos (born 27 July 1990) is a Spanish professional footballer who plays for Segunda Federación club UCAM Murcia. Left-footed, he can play anywhere on the attacking line but usually appears as both a winger or forward.

== Club career ==
Born in Murcia, Aquino made his professional debut for local Real Murcia CF at only 16 years of age, during 2006–07 in the Segunda División, against CD Tenerife; he scored in a 1–4 home loss for his only appearance of the season, which ended in promotion. In early 2007, rumours surfaced that Chelsea and Liverpool, amongst others, were after the youngster. Eventually no deals were arranged, as the player chose to stay in the country to further his development.

Aquino first appeared in La Liga on 20 January 2008, in a 3–1 away defeat to Real Zaragoza. After coach Lucas Alcaraz's dismissal and the arrival of Javier Clemente, he finished the campaign in the starting XI, and showed glimpses of an emerging talent. On 30 March he provided a cross for Quique de Lucas' opener at Deportivo de La Coruña (another 3–1 loss), and scored his only top-flight goal two months later, away against Racing de Santander – Murcia led by 2–0, lost 3–2 and ratified its relegation.

In 2008–09, Aquino was given a major role in the main squad but Murcia underachieved, battling for relegation during most of the competition and finally ranking 14th. At the end of the following season, the club finally dropped down a level and he left in June 2011, having featured sparingly in the process.

After further unsuccessful spells with Real Valladolid and Real Oviedo, Aquino moved to Atlético Madrid in mid-January 2013, and scored several goals for its C team in the Tercera División. He also caught the eye of main squad manager Diego Simeone who awarded him his first top-tier appearance in over five years on 1 June: after just a minute on the field, he assisted Diego Costa for the second goal in an eventual 3–1 win at Zaragoza.

On 10 June 2015, after scoring 17 times for Atlético's reserves in the Segunda División B, Aquino moved to CD Numancia. On 13 July of the following year, having netted only once during the whole season, he was released and signed for Racing de Santander just hours later. He netted 27 times in his first season in Cantabria, including all the goals of a 4–0 home victory over UD Mutilvera on 7 May 2017.

Aquino then had brief spells abroad with AEK Larnaca FC (Cypriot First Division) and Piast Gliwice (Polish Ekstraklasa), and a second one at Murcia. On 20 January 2020 he returned to Spain, signing with third-division club CD Badajoz with a "prohibitive buyout clause".

== International career ==
Aquino represented Spain at both under-17 and under-19 levels. During the 2007 FIFA U-17 World Cup he scored three goals and was the nation's second-best scorer, only trailing Bojan Krkić's five.

Subsequently, Aquino appeared at the 2008 UEFA European Under-19 Championship held in the Czech Republic.

== Personal life ==
Aquino's father, also named Daniel, was born in Argentina, but played for seven teams in Spain, most notably Murcia and Real Betis.

His younger brother Matías (born 1996) was also a forward, who competed exclusively in the lower leagues.

== Career statistics ==
As of match played 28 May 2022

Appearances and goals by club, season and competition
Club	Season	League			National Cup		Continental		Other		Total	
Club	Season	Division	Apps	Goals	Apps	Goals	Apps	Goals	Apps	Goals	Apps	Goals
Murcia	2006–07	Segunda División	1	1	0	0	—		—		1	1
Murcia	2007–08	La Liga	13	1	0	0	—		—		13	1
Murcia	2008–09	Segunda División	24	2	1	0	—		—		25	2
Murcia	2009–10	Segunda División	15	2	2	0	—		—		17	2
Murcia	2010–11	Segunda División B	20	1	1	0	—		4 (Note: Appearances in Segunda División B promotion playoffs)	1	25	2
Murcia	Total		73	7	4	0	0	0	4	1	81	8
Valladolid	2011–12	Segunda División	1	0	2	0	—		—		3	0
Oviedo	2012–13	Segunda División B	12	1	—		—		—		12	1
Atlético Madrid B	2012–13	Segunda División B	1	0	—		—		—		1	0
Atlético Madrid B	2013–14	Segunda División B	31	10	—		—		2 (Note: Appearances in Segunda División B relegation playoffs)	0	33	10
Atlético Madrid B	2014–15	Segunda División B	34	17	—		—		—		34	17
Atlético Madrid B	Total		66	27	0	0	0	0	2	0	68	27
Atlético Madrid	2012–13	La Liga	1	0	0	0	—		—		1	0
Numancia	2015–16	Segunda División	28	1	1	0	—		—		29	1
Racing Santander	2016–17	Segunda División B	36	23	4	1	—		6	3	46	27
Racing Santander	2017–18	Segunda División B	35	13	—		—		—		35	13
Racing Santander	Total		71	36	4	1	0	0	6	3	81	40
Murcia	2018–19	Segunda División B	17	8	1	0	—		—		18	8
AEK Larnaca (loan)	2018–19	First Division	12	2	4	0	—		—		16	2
Piast Gliwice	2019–20	Ekstraklasa	1	0	2	0	2 (Note: Appearances in UEFA Champions League)	0	1 (Note: Appearance in Polish Super Cup)	0	6	0
Badajoz	2019–20	Segunda División B	7	1	2	0	—		2	0	11	1
Badajoz	2020–21	Segunda División B	22	8	1	0	—		2	1	25	9
Badajoz	2021–22	Primera División RFEF	24	3	0	0	—		—		24	3
Badajoz	Total		53	12	3	0	0	0	4	1	60	13
Career total			335	94	21	1	2	0	17	5	375	100

== Honours ==
Ceuta

- Primera Federación: 2024–25

Spain U17

- UEFA European Under-17 Championship: 2007
- FIFA U-17 World Cup runner-up: 2007
