= Fran Ochoa =

Spanish footballer

Personal information
- Full name: Francisco José Ochoa Nieto
- Date of birth: 15 November 1989 (age 36)
- Place of birth: Cabra, Spain
- Height: 1.82 m (5 ft 11 1/2 in)
- Position: Midfielder

Team information
- Current team: Mataró

Youth career
- Damm

Senior career*
Years	Team	Apps	(Gls)
2008–2010	Villarreal C	44	(3)
2010–2012	Valladolid B	60	(6)
2011	Valladolid	0	(0)
2012–2013	Guijuelo	20	(1)
2013	Tenerife	7	(0)
2013–2015	Zamora	55	(1)
2015–2016	Arandina	28	(1)
2016–2017	Terrassa	2	(0)
2017–2018	Palamós	11	(0)
2018	Vilassar de Mar	13	(1)
2018–2019	Martinenc	11	(0)
2019–	Mataró	19	(2)
- * Club domestic league appearances and goals as of 00:22, 10 March 2020 (UTC)

Francisco 'Fran' José Ochoa Nieto (born 15 November 1989) is a Spanish footballer who plays for CE Mataró as a midfielder.

== Football career ==
Born in Cabra, Córdoba, Andalusia, Ochoa spent his first four years as a senior in the fourth division, with Villarreal CF C and Real Valladolid B. On 12 October 2011, he made his debut for the latter's first team, appearing in a 1–4 away defeat against Celta de Vigo for the season's Copa del Rey.

In July 2012, Ochoa signed with CD Guijuelo in the third division. In the following transfer window, however, he joined fellow league side CD Tenerife.
