= Lassana Camará =

Bissau-Guinean footballer

Saná
Personal information
- Full name: Lassana Camará
- Date of birth: 29 December 1991 (age 34)
- Place of birth: Bissau, Guinea-Bissau
- Height: 1.70 m (5 ft 7 in)
- Position: Midfielder

Youth career
- 2006–2010: Benfica

Senior career*
Years	Team	Apps	(Gls)
2010–2011	Benfica	0	(0)
2010–2011	→ Servette (loan)	7	(0)
2011–2012	Valladolid	2	(0)
2012–2013	Académica	0	(0)
2014	Botafogo-BA		
2014–2015	Braga B	21	(0)
2016–2017	Académico Viseu	10	(0)
2017–2018	Leixões	1	(0)
2018	Olhanense	3	(0)
2019	Gloria Buzău	1	(0)

International career^{‡}
2007–2008	Portugal U17	3	(0)
2008–2010	Portugal U19	32	(2)
2011	Portugal U20	13	(0)
2011	Portugal U21	3	(1)
2014–	Guinea-Bissau	3	(0)
Medal record
Men's football
Representing Portugal
FIFA U-20 World Cup
Runner-up	2011 Colombia
- * Club domestic league appearances and goals as of 9 December 2019 ‡ National team caps and goals as of 25 March 2017

Lassana Camará CvIH (born 29 December 1991), commonly known as Saná, is a Bissau-Guinean footballer who plays as a central midfielder. He also holds Portuguese citizenship.

== Club career ==
Born in Bissau, Guinea Bissau, Saná spent four years in S.L. Benfica's academy, scoring two goals in 33 games in his last year as a junior. He started his professional career at Servette FC in Switzerland: having arrived injured from the 2010 UEFA European Under-19 Championship, he only returned to competition in January 2011, and played just 257 minutes in the second division campaign as the João Alves-led side – a former Benfica player and also his youth manager – attained Super League promotion.

Saná signed a three-year contract with Real Valladolid in Spain on 9 July 2011. At the end of his first and only season the team promoted to La Liga after a two-year absence, but he only totalled 33 minutes of action and was released after several problems with the management and the board of directors.

On 30 August 2014, after nearly two years without a club and a brief spell in Brazil, Saná joined S.C. Braga, being assigned to the reserves in the Segunda Liga. He remained in that tier the following years, being rarely played at Académico de Viseu F.C. and Leixões SC.

Saná moved to SCM Gloria Buzău of the Romanian Liga III in late January 2019.

== International career ==
Saná won 51 caps for Portugal at youth level, including 13 for the under-20s. He helped them reach the final at the 2011 FIFA World Cup, appearing in three matches.

Saná switched allegiance to Guinea Bissau in 2014, making his debut on 2 August by playing 59 minutes in a 1–1 home draw against Botswana for the 2015 Africa Cup of Nations qualifiers.

== Honours ==
=== Club ===
Gloria Buzău

- Liga III: 2018–19

=== International ===
Portugal U20

- FIFA U-20 World Cup runner-up: 2011

=== Orders ===
- Knight of the Order of Prince Henry
