= Mondariz FC =

Mondariz
- Full name: Mondariz Fútbol Club
- Founded: 1920
- Ground: Campo Municipal A Lagoa, Mondariz, Galicia, Spain
- Chairman: José Pérez Souto
- Manager: José Luis Rivero
- League: Segunda Futgal – Vigo
- 2024–25: Segunda Futgal – Vigo, 4th of 16
| Home colours | Away colours |

Mondariz Fútbol Club, is a Spanish football club based in the municipality of Mondariz. Founded in 1920, they currently play in Segunda Futgal – Vigo.

== Season to season ==
| Season | Tier | Division | Place | Copa del Rey |
|---|---|---|---|---|
| 1968–69 | 5 | 1ª Reg. | 3rd | |
| 1969–70 | 5 | 1ª Reg. | 5th | |
| 1970–71 | 5 | 1ª Reg. | 1st | |
| 1971–72 | 5 | 1ª Reg. | 11th | |
| 1972–73 | 6 | 2ª Reg. | 1st | |
| 1973–74 | 5 | 1ª Reg. | 9th | |
| 1974–75 | 5 | 1ª Reg. | 9th | |
| 1975–76 | 5 | 1ª Reg. | 13th | |
| 1976–77 | 6 | 2ª Reg. | 11th | |
| 1977–78 | 7 | 2ª Reg. | 8th | |
| 1978–79 | 8 | 3ª Reg. | 7th | |
| 1979–80 | 8 | 3ª Reg. | 7th | |
| 1980–81 | 8 | 3ª Reg. | 3rd | |
| 1981–82 | 7 | 2ª Reg. | 14th | |
| 1982–83 | 7 | 2ª Reg. | 15th | |
| 1983–84 | 7 | 2ª Reg. | 10th | |
| 1984–85 | 7 | 2ª Reg. | 20th | |
| 1985–86 | 8 | 3ª Reg. | 5th | |
| 1986–87 | 8 | 3ª Reg. | 2nd | |
| 1987–88 | 7 | 2ª Reg. | 7th | |

| Season | Tier | Division | Place | Copa del Rey |
|---|---|---|---|---|
| 1988–89 | 7 | 2ª Reg. | 17th | |
| 1989–90 | 8 | 3ª Reg. | 1st | |
| 1990–91 | 7 | 2ª Reg. | 7th | |
| 1991–92 | 7 | 2ª Reg. | 1st | |
| 1992–93 | 6 | 1ª Reg. | 14th | |
| 1993–94 | 6 | 1ª Reg. | 20th | |
| 1994–95 | 7 | 2ª Reg. | 14th | |
| 1995–96 | 7 | 2ª Reg. | 14th | |
| 1996–97 | 7 | 2ª Reg. | 14th | |
| 1997–98 | 7 | 2ª Reg. | 11th | |
| 1998–99 | 7 | 2ª Reg. | 18th | |
| 1999–2000 | 8 | 3ª Reg. | 2nd | |
| 2000–01 | 7 | 2ª Reg. | 10th | |
| 2001–02 | 7 | 2ª Reg. | 2nd | |
| 2002–03 | 6 | 1ª Reg. | 13th | |
| 2003–04 | 6 | 1ª Reg. | 18th | |
| 2004–05 | 7 | 2ª Reg. | 3rd | |
| 2005–06 | 7 | 2ª Reg. | 4th | |
| 2006–07 | 7 | 2ª Aut. | 2nd | |
| 2007–08 | 6 | 1ª Aut. | 11th | |

| Season | Tier | Division | Place | Copa del Rey |
|---|---|---|---|---|
| 2008–09 | 6 | 1ª Aut. | 13th | |
| 2009–10 | 6 | 1ª Aut. | 14th | |
| 2010–11 | 6 | 1ª Aut. | 3rd | |
| 2011–12 | 5 | Pref. Aut. | 9th | |
| 2012–13 | 5 | Pref. Aut. | 16th | |
| 2013–14 | 5 | Pref. Aut. | 14th | |
| 2014–15 | 5 | Pref. Aut. | 9th | |
| 2015–16 | 5 | Pref. | 13th | |
| 2016–17 | 5 | Pref. | 16th | |
| 2017–18 | 5 | Pref. | 12th | |
| 2018–19 | 5 | Pref. | 11th | |
| 2019–20 | 5 | Pref. | 7th | |
| 2020–21 | 5 | Pref. | 5th | |
| 2021–22 | 6 | Pref. | 12th | |
| 2022–23 | 7 | 1ª Gal. | 13th | |
| 2023–24 | 8 | 2ª Gal. | 12th | |
| 2024–25 | 8 | 2ª Futgal | 4th | |
| 2025–26 | 8 | 2ª Futgal | | |
