= 2010–11 CE Sabadell FC season =

Sabadell
2010–11 season
- Chairman: Joan Soteras Vigo
- Manager: Lluís Carreras
- Segunda División B (Group 3): Winners
- Group Winners promotion play-off: Runners-up; Promoted to Liga Adelante
- RFEF League Trophy: Round of 16
- Top goalscorer: League: Ibusuki (10); All: Ibusuki (11)
Home colours	Away colours

The 2010–11 Spanish football season is Sabadell's fourth consecutive season in Segunda División B, the third level in the Spanish football leagues system. Lluís Carreras is the club's new manager.

== Trophies balance ==
Category	Trophy	Started round	First match	Result	Last match
Friendly Trophy	25th Torneig d´Històrics del Futbol Català	Group Stage	3 August 2010	Group Stage	3 August 2010
Friendly Trophy	2010–11 Copa Catalunya	Third qualifying round	22 August 2010	Withdrew	None
Friendly Trophy	2010 Vila de Llagostera Trophy	Final	12 August 2010	Winners	12 August 2010
Friendly Trophy	2010 Ciutat de Igualada Trophy	Final	22 August 2010	Winners	22 August 2010
Competitive	Segunda División B	—	29 August 2010	Winners	15 May 2011
Competitive	Segunda División B Group Winners promotion play-off	Semifinals	22 May 2011	Runners-up (Promoted)	12 June 2011
Competitive	RFEF League Trophy	Autonomous Communities Qualifying Stage	6 October 2010	Round of 16	19 January 2011

=== Competitive Balance ===
Biggest win
	Home				Away			
Segunda División B	19 December 2010	Matchday 18	v. CD Dénia	4 – 0	24 April 2011	Matchday 35	v. Castellón	0 – 2
Group Winners promotion play-off	4 June 2011	Final, 1st leg	v. Real Murcia	1 – 0	None			
RFEF League Trophy	20 October 2010	Round of 16, 1st leg	v. Real Zaragoza B	3 – 1	None			
Biggest loss
	Home				Away			
Segunda División B	22 September 2010	Matchday 5	v. Teruel	0 – 2	10 October 2010	Matchday 8	v. Gandía	1 – 0
Segunda División B	22 September 2010	Matchday 5	v. Teruel	0 – 2	31 October 2010	Matchday 11	v. Orihuela	1 – 0
Segunda División B	22 September 2010	Matchday 5	v. Teruel	0 – 2	23 January 2011	Matchday 22	v. Sporting Mahonés	1 – 0
Group Winners promotion play-off	None				12 June 2011	Final, 2nd leg	v. Real Murcia	1 – 0
RFEF League Trophy	None				19 January 2011	Round of 16, 2nd leg	v. Real Zaragoza B	2 – 0

== Summer transfers ==
=== In ===
(substituted on) In (8 players)
Player	From
(Spain) Toni Lao	(Spain) Gramenet
(Spain) Alberto Manga	(Spain) Girona
(Spain) Mikel Azparren	(Spain) La Nucia
(Spain) Fito Miranda	(Spain) CE Sabadell B
(Spain) Joaquín Rodríguez	(Spain) San Roque Lepe
(Spain) Raúl Rodríguez	(Spain) Gramenet
(Spain) Aitor Ramírez	(Spain) Damm
(Spain) Oriol Torres	(Italy) Internazionale Primavera

=== Out ===
(substituted off) Out (14 players)
Player	New Team
(Spain) Joel Álvarez	(Spain) Sant Andreu
(Spain) Raúl Pradas	(Spain) Gramenet
(Spain) Xavier Pelegrí	(Spain) Sant Andreu
(Spain) Jaume Berlanga	(Spain) UE Cornellà
(Spain) Blas Vílchez	(Spain) Santboià
(Spain) Àxel Vizuete	(Spain) Gramenet
(Spain) Adrià Mir	(Spain) Gramenet
(Spain) Fran Arévalo	(Spain) AE Prat
(Spain) Jose Francisco Castell	(Spain) Alzira
(Spain) Arnal Llibert	(Cyprus) AEK Larnaca
(Spain) Roberto Morales	Unattached
(Spain) Xavi Ginard	TBA
(Spain) Jesús Milán	TBA
(Spain) Jordi Sánchez	TBA

=== Loan in ===
(substituted on) Loan in (3 players)
Player	From
(Spain) Juanjo Ciércoles	(Spain) RCD Espanyol B
(Japan) Hiroshi Ibusuki	(Spain) Girona
(Spain) Isaac Cuenca	(Spain) FC Barcelona Juvenil A

=== Loan out ===
(substituted off) Loan out (1 player)
Player	To
(Spain) Víctor Rodríguez	(Spain) CE Premià

=== Loan return ===
(substituted on) Loan return (1 player)
Italics for players returning to the club but left it during pre-season
Player	From
(Spain) Marc Fernández	(Spain) CE Europa

== Winter transfers ==
=== Loan out ===
(substituted off) Loan out (1 player)
Player	To
(Spain) Aitor Ramírez	(Spain) CD Dénia

== Current squad ==
=== Squad ===
Note: Flags indicate national team as defined under FIFA eligibility rules; some limited exceptions apply. Players may hold more than one non-FIFA nationality.

No.	Pos.	Nation	Player
1	GK	ESP	David De Navas
2	DF	ESP	Chapi Arnau
3	DF	ESP	David Bermudo
4	DF	ESP	Pep Pagès
5	DF	ESP	Agustín Fernández (captain)
6	MF	ESP	Julián Robles
7	MF	ESP	Raúl Rodríguez
8	MF	ESP	Albert Puigdollers
9	FW	ESP	Joaquín Rodríguez
10	MF	GEQ	Juvenal Edjogo
11	MF	ESP	Eneko Fernández

No.	Pos.	Nation	Player
12	MF	ESP	Juanjo Ciércoles (On loan from RCD Espanyol B)
13	GK	ESP	Oriol Torres
14	DF	ESP	Àlex Ruiz
15	FW	JPN	Hiroshi Ibusuki (On loan from Girona)
17	DF	ESP	Toni Lao
18	MF	ESP	Alberto Manga
19	DF	ESP	Mikel Azparren
20	FW	ESP	Isaac Cuenca (On loan from FC Barcelona Atlètic)
21	MF	ESP	Fito Miranda
22	FW	ESP	Marc Fernández

=== Youth system ===
Note: Flags indicate national team as defined under FIFA eligibility rules; some limited exceptions apply. Players may hold more than one non-FIFA nationality.

No.	Pos.	Nation	Player
—	FW	ESP	Nelbert Barbosa
—	MF	ESP	Mario Quereda
—	MF	ESP	Miguel Ángel Chica
—	MF	ESP	Toni Delgado

No.	Pos.	Nation	Player
—	MF	ESP	Jaume PINILLA García
—	MF	ESP	Sergio
—	MF	ESP	Jonathan

=== Nominated by their national football team ===
List of players nominated by their national team
10	Juvenal Edjogo	Equatorial Guinea	v. Morocco (11 August 2010) v. Botswana (12 October 2010) v. Gambia (29 March 2011)
15	Hiroshi Ibusuki	Japan U19	v. United Arab Emirates (4 October 2010) v. Vietnam (6 October 2010) v. Jordan (8 October 2010) v. South Korea (11 October 2010)
15	Hiroshi Ibusuki	Japan U22	v. Kuwait (9 February 2011) v. Bahrain (12 February 2011)

== Match stats ==
=== League stats ===
No.	Pos.	Player	Goal		Booked		(yellow card) (yellow-red card)		Sent off (straight red)	
No.	Pos.	Player	League	Promotion P.O.	League	Promotion P.O.	League	Promotion P.O.	League	Promotion P.O.
1	GK	(Spain) David de Navas			2					
2	DF	(Spain) Chapi Arnau			8	1	1			
3	DF	(Spain) David Bermudo			8	1	1			
4	DF	(Spain) Pep Pagès			1	1				
5	DF	(Spain) Agustín Fernández	2		15	2				
6	MF	(Spain) Julián Robles	2		9					
7	MF	(Spain) Raúl Rodríguez			5					
8	MF	(Spain) Albert Puigdollers	2		3					
9	FW	(Spain) Joaquín Rodríguez	2		3	2				
10	MF	(Equatorial Guinea) Juvenal Edjogo	6		6					
11	MF	(Spain) Eneko Fernández	4		1					
12	MF	(Spain) Juanjo Ciércoles			10					
14	DF	(Spain) Àlex Ruiz	1		2					
15	FW	(Japan) Hiroshi Ibusuki	10		7					
17	DF	(Spain) Toni Lao			6	3				
18	MF	(Spain) Alberto Manga			5					
19	DF	(Spain) Mikel Azparren	1		6				1	
20	FW	(Spain) Isaac Cuenca	4	1	4					
21	MF	(Spain) Fito Miranda	4		7					
22	FW	(Spain) Marc Fernández	4	1	5					

=== RFEF League Trophy Goals ===
1 goal

- (Japan) Hiroshi Ibusuki
- (Spain) Julián Robles
- (Spain) Fito Miranda
- (Spain) Aitor Ramírez
- (Spain) Joaquín Rodríguez

== Match results ==
=== Pre-season ===
==== Friendly matches ====
31 July 2010	CE Sabadell	4–0	(Spain) Terrassa	Sant Oleguer, Sabadell (Barcelona)
10:30 CEST	Morales; Quereda; Rodríguez; Manga	(Report)		Stadium: Josep Molins; Attendance: 600

14 August 2010	CE Sabadell	0–0	(Spain) CF Olesa	Sant Oleguer, Sabadell (Barcelona)
18:30 CEST				Stadium: Josep Molins; Attendance: 300

19 August 2010	FC Barcelona Atlètic (Spain)	1–0	CE Sabadell	Barcelona
20:00 CEST	Soriano 17'	(Report)		Stadium: Mini Estadi; Attendance: 500

==== 25th Torneig d'Històrics del Futbol Català ====
Note: All the matches have 45 minutes duration.

GROUP B	Pld	W	D	L	GF	GA	GD	Pts
(Spain) UA Horta	2	2	0	0	4	1	+3	6
(Spain) CE Premià	2	1	0	1	2	3	−1	3
(Spain) CE Sabadell	2	0	0	2	0	2	−2	0

3 August 2010 Group Stage	CE Sabadell	0–1	UA Horta	Barcelona
18:30 CEST		(Report)	31' Eric	Stadium: Municipal del Guinardó; Attendance: 500

3 August 2010 Group Stage	CE Sabadell	0–1	CE Premià	Barcelona
19:30 CEST		(Report)	18' Jonathan	Stadium: Municipal del Guinardó; Attendance: 500

==== 2010 Vila de Llagostera Trophy ====
12 August 2010 Final	UE Llagostera (Spain)	1–1 (2–5 p)	CE Sabadell	Llagostera (Girona)
	Uri 32'	(Report)	51' Fito	Stadium: Municipal de Llagostera; Attendance: 200

==== 2010–11 Copa Catalunya ====
22 August 2010 3rd qualifying round	EquipoJA (Spain)	Called off	CE Sabadell	Barcelona
		(Withdrawal)		Stadium: Municipal Eduardo Aunos

==== 2010 Ciutat de Igualada Trophy ====
22 August 2010 Final	CF Igualada (Spain)	1–3	CE Sabadell	Igualada (Barcelona)
18:00 CEST	Roger 80' (pen.)	(Report)	14' Puigdollers; 60' Fito; 61' Raúl	Stadium: Les Comes

=== Segunda División B ===
Matchday	1	2	3	4	5	6	7	8	9	10	11	12	13	14	15	16	17	18	19	20	21	22	23	24	25	26	27	28	29	30	31	32	33	34	35	36	37	38
Against	LLE	BAD	SMH	BEN	TER	ALI	ALZ	GAN	MLLB	HOS	ORI	GRM	BAL	STA	ONT	CAS	ACY	DÉN	SBÀ	LLE	BAD	SMH	BEN	TER	ALI	ALZ	GAN	MLLB	HOS	ORI	GRM	BAL	STA	ONT	CAS	ACY	DÉN	SBÀ
Venue	H	A	H	A	H	A	H	A	H	A	A	H	A	H	A	H	A	H	A	A	H	A	H	A	H	A	H	A	H	H	A	H	A	H	A	H	A	H
Position	15	13	5	8	12	7	4	8	4	8	9	7	7	5	4	4	3	2	3	3	3	3	2	2	2	2	2	1	2	3	1	1	1	1	1	1	1	1
Goal Average (useful in case of tie)																				Won	Won	Lost	Won	Lost	Won	Won	Lost	Won	Lost	Lost	Won	Won	Won	Won	Won	D	Won	Won

Win Draw Lost

		All							Home							Away						
		Pts	W	D	L	F	A	Dif.	Pts	W	D	L	F	A	Dif.	Pts	W	D	L	F	A	Dif.
1	CE Sabadell (C)	69	19	12	7	42	24	+18	36	10	6	3	24	12	+12	33	9	6	4	18	12	+6

League Group Winners (qualified to Group Winners promotion play-off and to 2011–12 Copa del Rey 1st round)
Qualified to Non-champions promotion play-off (also qualified to 2011–12 Copa del Rey 1st round)
Only qualified to 2011–12 Copa del Rey
Qualified to relegation play-off
Relegation to Tercera División

29 August 2010 1	CE Sabadell	0–0	UE Lleida	Sabadell (Barcelona)
19:00 CEST	Azparren (yellow card) 50'; Manga (yellow card) 88'	(Report)	(yellow card) 13' Massana; (yellow card) 33' (yellow-red card) 65' Vázquez	Stadium: Nova Creu Alta; Referee: (Valencian Community) Barberá Fuentes

5 September 2010 2	Badalona	1–1	CE Sabadell	Badalona (Barcelona)
18:00 CEST	Sellares 6', (yellow card) 21'; Prats (yellow card) 55'; Robles (yellow card) 89'	(Report)	(yellow card) 28' Eneko; (yellow card) 28' Robles; (yellow card) 38' Manga; 75', (yellow card) 81' Ibusuki	Stadium: Camp del Centenari; Referee: (Canary Islands) Alemán Pérez

12 September 2010 3	CE Sabadell	2–1	Sporting Mahonés	Sabadell (Barcelona)
12:00 CEST	Eneko 12'; Azparren (yellow card) 37'; Ibusuki 53'; Agustín (yellow card) 62'; Puigdollers (yellow card) 78'; Robles (yellow card) 87'	(Report)	(yellow card) 26' Moyano; (yellow card) 34' Jeroni; 57' Marcos	Stadium: Nova Creu Alta; Referee: (Canary Islands) Pérez Peraza

18 September 2010 4	Benidorm	1–1	CE Sabadell	Benidorm (Alicante)
19:00 CEST	Cubillas (yellow card) 9', (goal) 10'; Carrasco (yellow card) 20'; Agulló (yellow card) 37' (yellow-red card) 75'; Valero (yellow card) 62'; Obele (yellow card) 78'	(Report)	(yellow card) 39' Bermudo; 76' (pen.) Ibusuki; (yellow card) 88' Arnau	Stadium: Guillermo Amor; Referee: (Region of Murcia) Melgares de Aguilar

22 September 2010 5	CE Sabadell	0–2	Teruel	Sabadell (Barcelona)
20:00 CEST	Agustín (yellow card) 19'; Raúl (yellow card) 90+1'	(Report)	26' Arcega; (yellow card) 31' Pi; (yellow card) 38' Hernández; (yellow card) 54' Abeina; 70' González	Stadium: Nova Creu Alta; Referee: (Valencian Community) Abad Esteban

26 September 2010 6	Alicante	0–1	CE Sabadell	Alicante
11:45 CEST	Urrea (yellow card) 27'	(Report)	38' Cuenca; (yellow card) 56' Bermudo; (yellow card) 73' Puigdollers; (yellow card) 85' Juvenal	Stadium: Rico Pérez; Referee: (Community of Madrid) Pizarro Gómez

3 October 2010 7	CE Sabadell	1–0	Alzira	Sabadell (Barcelona)
17:00 CEST	Marc 35'; Joaquín (yellow card) 40'; Agustín (yellow card) 51'; Bermudo (yellow card) 55'; Manga (yellow card) 79'	(Report)	(yellow card) 34' (yellow-red card) 57' Amarilla; (yellow card) 65' Rivera	Stadium: Nova Creu Alta; Attendance: 2,000; Referee: (Canary Islands) Suárez Betancor

10 October 2010 8	Gandía	1–0	CE Sabadell	Gandía (Valencia)
18:00 CEST	Sánchez 21'; Cristian (yellow card) 48'; Romera (yellow card) 87'	(Report)	Raúl (yellow card) 71'; Fito (yellow card) 87'	Stadium: Guillermo Olagüe; Attendance: 300; Referee: (Community of Madrid) Sánchez-Seco Otero

17 October 2010 9	CE Sabadell	2–0	RCD Mallorca B	Sabadell (Barcelona)
12:00 CEST	Cuenca 21' (pen.); Arnau (yellow card) 38'; Azparren (yellow card) 54'; Miranda (yellow card) 69'; Ibusuki (yellow card) 73'; Marc 76'	(Report)	(yellow card) 20' Soria; (yellow card) 28' Tejera; (yellow card) 34' Álvarez	Stadium: Nova Creu Alta; Referee: (Valencian Community) Mateo Valero

24 October 2010 10	L'Hospitalet	1–1	CE Sabadell	L'Hospitalet de Llobregat (Barcelona)
12:00 CEST	Gómez (yellow card) 16'; Velamazán 29'; Hammouch (yellow card) 44'; Comadevall (yellow card) 62'; Viale (yellow card) 88'	(Report)	(yellow card) 2' Bermudo; (yellow card) 5' Ciércoles; (yellow card) 7' Miranda; 17' Puigdollers; (yellow card) 32' Raúl	Stadium: La Feixa Llarga; Referee: (Canary Islands) Pinto Herrera

31 October 2010 11	Orihuela	1–0	CE Sabadell	Orihuela (Alicante)
17:00 CET	Rodri 21'; Samu (yellow card) 25'; Molina (yellow card) 64'	(Report)	(yellow card) 73' Agustín; (yellow card) 75' Miranda; (yellow card) 81' Cuenca	Stadium: Los Arcos; Referee: (Castilla–La Mancha) Jiménez Moreno

7 November 2010 12	CE Sabadell	1–0	Gramenet	Sabadell (Barcelona)
17:00 CET	Cuenca (yellow card) 12'; Fernández 44'; Juvenal (yellow card) 88'	(Report)	(yellow card) 15' Cespedes	Stadium: Nova Creu Alta; Referee: (Canary Islands) Ramos Rodríguez

14 November 2010 13	Atlético Baleares	0–0	CE Sabadell	Palma de Mallorca
12:00 CET	Ademola (yellow card) 73'; Nworah (yellow card) 80'; Hoyos (yellow card) 88'	(Report)	(yellow card) 73' Ciércoles	Stadium: Balear; Referee: (Valencian Community) Sanchís Cambra

21 November 2010 14	CE Sabadell	2–0	Sant Andreu	Sabadell (Barcelona)
12:00 CET	Bermudo (yellow card) 21'; Marc 43'; Agustín (yellow card) 60', (goal) 81'; Arnau (yellow card) 70'	(Report)	(yellow card) 26' Cacho; (yellow card) 61' Moro	Stadium: Nova Creu Alta; Referee: (Canary Islands) Acosta Lorenzo

28 November 2010 15	Ontinyent	1–2	CE Sabadell	Ontinyent (Valencia)
17:00 CET	López 18' (pen.); Esteban (yellow card) 57'; Remón (yellow card) 58' (yellow-red card) 74'; García (yellow card) 72'	(Report)	(yellow card) 17' Robles; (yellow card) 53' Arnau; 64' Ibusuki; (yellow card) 76' Miranda; (yellow card) 89' Lao; 90+' Juvenal	Stadium: El Clariano; Referee: (Aragon) Herrero Arenas

5 December 2010 16	CE Sabadell	1–1	Castellón	Sabadell (Barcelona)
17:00 CET	Ciércoles (yellow card) 28'; Bermudo (yellow card) 35' (yellow-red card) 59'; Fernández 63'; Lao (yellow card) 74'; Cuenca (yellow card) 84'	(Report)	(yellow card) 39' Simón; (yellow card) 75' Toño; 75' (pen.) Loro; (yellow card) 78' Lolo	Stadium: Nova Creu Alta; Referee: (Aragon) Adrián Lixandru

12 December 2010 17	Alcoyano	0–1	CE Sabadell	Alcoy (Alicante)
17:00 CET	Dani (yellow card) 47'; Martín (yellow card) 51'	(Report)	44' Puigdollers; (yellow card) 59' Arnau; (yellow card) 88' Fernández	Stadium: El Collao; Referee: (Region of Murcia) Navarro Fuentes

19 December 2010 18	CE Sabadell	4–0	CD Dénia	Sabadell (Barcelona)
17:00 CET	Robles 17'; Cuenca 23'; Ruiz 41'; Ciércoles (yellow card) 58'; Juvenal (yellow card) 83'; Miranda 90+1'	(Report)	(yellow card) 13' Koeman; (yellow card) 25' Losa; (yellow card) 38' Dani; (yellow card) 44' Gervasio; (yellow card) 88' Aceitón	Stadium: Nova Creu Alta; Referee: (La Rioja) Diego Ocón Arráiz

23 December 2010 19	Santboià	2–2	CE Sabadell	Sant Boi de Llobregat (Barcelona)
21:00 CET	Aleix (yellow card) 15'; Heredia (yellow card) 26'; García (yellow card) 50'; Valero 55'; Monteys 86' (pen.)	(Report)	(yellow card) 50' Ruiz; 50' (pen.) Ibusuki; 57' Azparren; (yellow card) 67' Raúl; (yellow card) 86' Fernández	Stadium: Joan Baptista Milà; Referee: (Aragon) López Muñoz

9 January 2011 20	UE Lleida	0–1	CE Sabadell	Lleida
17:00 CET	Eizagirre (yellow card) 30'	(Report)	(yellow card) 28' (yellow-red card) 80' Arnau; (yellow card) 42' Lao; 56' Ibusuki; (yellow card) 59' Fernández; (yellow card) 78' Ciércoles; (yellow card) 82' Miranda; (yellow card) 90+2' De Navas	Stadium: Camp d´Esports; Referee: (La Rioja) Hermosilla Alaña

16 January 2011 21	CE Sabadell	0–0	Badalona	Sabadell (Barcelona)
17:00 CET	Ibusuki (yellow card) 35'; Azparren (yellow card) 75'	(Report)	(yellow card) 17' Casado; (yellow card) 29' Vázquez; (yellow card) 72' Muñoz	Stadium: Nova Creu Alta; Referee: (Valencian Community) Bernal Moreno

23 January 2011 22	Sporting Mahonés	1–0	CE Sabadell	Maó (Menorca)
12:00 CET	Trujillo 9'; Iray (yellow card) 39'; R. Capó (yellow card) 52'; P. L. Capó (yellow card) 63'; Eloi (yellow card) 90+2'	(Report)	(yellow card) 57' Fernández	Stadium: Bintaufa; Referee: (Valencian Community) Sanz Terrades

30 January 2011 23	CE Sabadell	1–0	Benidorm	Sabadell (Barcelona)
17:00 CET	Ibusuki 2', (yellow card) 86'; Azparren (yellow card) 42'; Ciércoles (yellow card) 47'; Marc (yellow card) 89'	(Report)	(yellow card) 50' Cubillas; (yellow card) 70' Albalat; (yellow card) 75' Gil; (yellow card) 85' Valero	Stadium: Nova Creu Alta; Referee: (Canary Islands) Pulido Santana

6 February 2011 24	Teruel	1–1	CE Sabadell	Teruel
17:00 CET	Salva Chamorro 30'; Monforte (yellow card) 49'; Abenia (yellow card) 51'; Pi (yellow card) 89'	(Report)	21' Miranda; (yellow card) 29' Arnau; (yellow card) 44' Fernández; (yellow card) 89' Marc; (yellow card) 89' Ibusuki	Stadium: Pinilla; Referee: (Valencian Community) García Castillo

13 February 2011 25	CE Sabadell	1–1	Alicante	Sabadell (Barcelona)
17:00 CET	Cuenca 19'; Juvenal (yellow card) 21'; Robles (yellow card) 28'	(Report)	36' Uriarte; (yellow card) 69' García; (yellow card) 78' Martínez; (yellow card) 88' Alcántara; (yellow card) 90+1' Maciá	Stadium: Nova Creu Alta; Referee: (La Rioja) García Ballesteros

20 February 2011 26	Alzira	0–1	CE Sabadell	Alzira (Valencia)
12:00 CET	Amarilla (yellow card) 43'; Gimeno (yellow card) 71'	(Report)	(yellow card) 66' Robles; 72' Eneko; (yellow card) 78' Azparren; (yellow card) 87' Fernández	Stadium: Luis Suñer Picó; Referee: (Aragon) Muñoz Caravaca

27 February 2011 27	CE Sabadell	2–2	Gandía	Sabadell (Barcelona)
17:00 CET	Juvenal 3'; Agustín (yellow card) 26'; Marc 42'; De Navas (yellow card) 53'	(Report)	27' (pen.) San Julián; (yellow card) 42' Hernández; (yellow card) 67' Apesteguía; (yellow card) 73' (yellow-red card) 78' Floro; 90+3' Verdés	Stadium: Nova Creu Alta; Referee: (Balearic Islands) González González

6 March 2011 28	RCD Mallorca B	0–1	CE Sabadell	Palma de Mallorca
12:00 CET	Enrich (yellow card) 37'; Nadal (yellow card) 68'; Soria (red card) 68'; Villar (yellow card) 86'; N'Golo (yellow card) 90'	(Report)	(yellow card) 31' Ciércoles; (yellow card) 57' Marc; 69' Juvenal; (yellow card) 82' Agustín	Stadium: Son Bibiloni; Referee: (Castile and León) Román Román

13 March 2011 29	CE Sabadell	1–2	L'Hospitalet	Sabadell (Barcelona)
17:00 CET	Juvenal (yellow card) 44', (goal) 61' (pen.); Ruiz (yellow card) 51'; Ibusuki (yellow card) 57'; Arnau (yellow card) 68'	(Report)	33' López; 39' Cirio; (yellow card) 40' Viale; (yellow card) 60' Gómez	Stadium: Nova Creu Alta; Referee: (Valencian Community) Bosch Domenech

20 March 2011 30	CE Sabadell	1–1	Orihuela	Sabadell (Barcelona)
17:00 CET	Ibusuki 40'; Manga (yellow card) 89'	(Report)	49' Molina; (yellow card) 83' Carmelo	Stadium: Nova Creu Alta; Attendance: 5,200; Referee: (Canary Islands) Cardona Santana

27 March 2011 31	Gramenet	1–2	CE Sabadell	Santa Coloma de Gramenet (Barcelona)
11:45 CEST	Vázquez (yellow card) 25'; Vila 50'; Canelada (yellow card) 82' (yellow-red card) 84'; Barragán (yellow card) 84'; Joaquín (yellow card) 86'	(Report)	(yellow card) 37' Lao; (red card) 61' Azparren; (yellow card) 76', (goal) 90+3' Rodríguez; (yellow card) 80' Marc; 80' Miranda; (yellow card) 86' Ciércoles	Stadium: Nou Camp Municipal; Referee: (Basque Country (autonomous community)) Suberbiola Zúñiga

3 April 2011 32	CE Sabadell	3–1	Atlético Baleares	Sabadell (Barcelona)
12:00 CEST	Robles (yellow card) 36'; Ibusuki 53'; Raúl (yellow card) 72'; Rodríguez 74'; Miranda 82'	(Report)	(yellow card) 47' Diop; 57' García; (yellow card) 63' Del Castillo	Stadium: Nova Creu Alta; Referee: (Canary Islands) Alemán Pérez

10 April 2011 33	Sant Andreu	0–1	CE Sabadell	Barcelona
17:00 CEST	Martí (yellow card) 17'; Moyano (yellow card) 68'; Sánchez (yellow card) 87'	(Report)	39' Juvenal; (yellow card) 49' Manga; (yellow card) 58' Miranda; (yellow card) 61' Agustín	Stadium: Narcís Sala; Referee: (Balearic Islands) Lara Ortega

17 April 2011 34	CE Sabadell	1–0	Ontinyent	Sabadell (Barcelona)
18:00 CEST	Lao (yellow card) 28'; Bermudo (yellow card) 69'; Marc (yellow card) 86'; Eneko 86'	(Report)	(yellow card) 45' Manu; (yellow card) 65' Navarro; (yellow card) 68' Kikín; (yellow card) 85' Reguero; (yellow card) 85' Bonastre	Stadium: Nova Creu Alta; Referee: (Basque Country (autonomous community)) Azkue Otegi

24 April 2011 35	Castellón	0–2	CE Sabadell	Castellón
17:00 CEST	Torlá (yellow card) 10'; Lázaro (yellow card) 22'; Castillo (yellow card) 34'; Bueso (yellow card) 48'	(Report)	29' Juvenal; (yellow card) 60' Ciércoles; (yellow card) 77', (goal) 88' Robles	Stadium: Castalia; Referee: (Navarre) Flores Roda

1 May 2011 36	CE Sabadell	0–1	Alcoyano	Sabadell (Barcelona)
18:00 CEST	Ciércoles (yellow card) 44'; Ibusuki (yellow card) 51'; Agustín (yellow card) 76'; Juvenal (yellow card) 89'	(Report)	21' Fabiani; (yellow card) 31' Gato; (yellow card) 44' Molina; (yellow card) 89' Jorge	Stadium: Nova Creu Alta; Attendance: 6,105; Referee: (La Rioja) Diego Ocón Arráiz

8 May 2011 37	CD Dénia	1–0	CE Sabadell	Dénia (Alicante)
12:00 CEST	Bueno 25'; Pinto (yellow card) 40'; Signes (yellow card) 54'; Mendoza (yellow card) 68'; Fernández (yellow card) 88'	(Report)	(yellow card) 57' Cuenca; (yellow card) 63' Robles; (yellow card) 69' Joaquín; (yellow card) 87' Puigdollers	Stadium: Camp Nou; Referee: (Navarre) Berjano Ariztegui

15 May 2011 38	CE Sabadell	1–0	Santboià	Sabadell (Barcelona)
19:00 CEST	Pagès (yellow card) 12'; Robles (yellow card) 60'; Lao (yellow card) 66'; Ibusuki 75'; Bermudo (yellow card) 79'	(Report)	(yellow card) 32' Monty; (yellow card) 72' Cárdenas	Stadium: Nova Creu Alta; Referee: (Canary Islands) Pérez Peraza

==== Promotion play-off ====
===== Group Winners play-off =====
====== Semifinals ======
Qualified as Group 3 champions. The draw was in RFEF headquarters, in Las Rozas (Madrid), on Monday 16 May 2011, at 16:30 CEST.

22 May 2011 First leg	CE Sabadell	0–0	SD Eibar	Sabadell (Barcelona)
19:30 CEST		(Report)	(yellow card) 19' García; (yellow card) 44' Valín; (yellow card) 79' Kijera	Stadium: Nova Creu Alta; Attendance: 15,000; Referee: (Aragon) Usón Rosel

28 May 2011 Second leg	SD Eibar	1–1	CE Sabadell	Eibar (Guipúzcoa)
18:00 CEST	Lanzarote 71'; Cuevas (yellow card) 87'	(Report)	(yellow card) 21' Agustín; (yellow card) 51' Bermudo; 56' Marc; (yellow card) 90+2' Lao; (yellow card) 90+4' Joaquín	Stadium: Ipurua; Referee: (Castile and León) Vicente Moral

CE Sabadell 1–1 SD Eibar on aggregate. CE Sabadell won on away goals. CE Sabadell promoted to Liga Adelante 19 years later.

====== Final ======
4 June 2011 First leg	CE Sabadell	1–0	Real Murcia	Sabadell (Barcelona)
20:30 CEST	Pagès (yellow card) 22'; Agustín (yellow card) 62'; Lao (yellow card) 81'; Cuenca 85'; Joaquín (yellow card) 89'	(Report)		Stadium: Nova Creu Alta; Attendance: 2,500; Referee: (Balearic Islands) Ripoll Solano

12 June 2011 Second leg	Real Murcia	1–0 (a.e.t.) (9–8 p)	CE Sabadell	Murcia
18:45 CEST	Urzaiz (yellow card) 39'; Marín (yellow card) 42'; Carles (yellow card) 66'; Sánchez (yellow card) 70'; Aquino 72'; Cañadas (yellow card) 73'	(Report)	(yellow card) 19' Arnau; (yellow card) 41' Lao	Stadium: Nueva Condomina; Referee: (Canary Islands) Ramos Rodríguez
	Penalties
	Kike (penalty scored); Carles (penalty scored); Cañadas (penalty scored); Luciano (penalty scored); Aquino (penalty scored); Isaac (penalty scored); Sánchez (penalty scored); Cifuentes (penalty scored); Chando (penalty scored)		(penalty scored) Miranda; (penalty scored) Robles; (penalty scored) Cuenca; (penalty scored) Marc; (penalty scored) Bermudo; (penalty scored) Agustín; (penalty scored) Lao; (penalty scored) Puigdollers; (penalty missed) Raúl

CE Sabadell 1–1 Real Murcia on aggregate. Real Murcia became Segunda División B champions by winning 9–8 at the penalty shootout.

=== RFEF League Trophy ===
==== Autonomous Communities Qualifying Stage (Catalonia) ====
6 October 2010 First leg	UE Lleida	0–0	CE Sabadell	Lleida
20:00 CEST		(Report)		Stadium: Camp d´Esports; Attendance: 1,000; Referee: (Catalonia) Ávalos Martos

20 October 2010 Second leg	CE Sabadell	1–0	UE Lleida	Sabadell (Barcelona)
20:00 CEST	Ibusuki 69'	(Report)		Stadium: Nova Creu Alta; Referee: (Catalonia) Gracia Álvarez

CE Sabadell won 1–0 on aggregate.

==== Round of 32 ====
24 November 2010 First leg	Atlético Baleares	1–1	CE Sabadell	Palma de Mallorca
17:00 CET	Savoia 22'	(Report)	70' Robles	Stadium: Balear; Attendance: 150

8 December 2010 Second leg	CE Sabadell	0–0	Atlético Baleares	Sabadell (Barcelona)
16:00 CET	Quereda (yellow card)	(Report)	(yellow card) Goffin	Stadium: Nova Creu Alta; Attendance: 500; Referee: (Catalonia) Sauleda Torrent

Atlético Baleares 1–1 CE Sabadell on aggregate. CE Sabadell won on away goals.

==== Round of 16 ====
12 January 2011 First leg	CE Sabadell	3–1	Real Zaragoza B	Sabadell (Barcelona)
18:00 CET	Miranda 46'; Ramírez 73'; Rodríguez 75'; Oriol (yellow card)	(Report)	44' Edu	Stadium: Nova Creu Alta; Referee: (Catalonia) Pérez Bueno

19 January 2011 Second leg	Real Zaragoza B	2–0	CE Sabadell	Zaragoza
16:00 CET	Creus 6'; Matas 20'	(Report)	(yellow card) Jonathan	Stadium: Ciudad Deportiva; Referee: (Aragon) Cote Aragón

CE Sabadell 3–3 Real Zaragoza B on aggregate. Real Zaragoza B won on away goals.
