= 2011 Segunda División B play-offs =

Spanish football league play-offs

The 2011 Segunda División B play-offs (Playoffs de Ascenso or Promoción de Ascenso) were the final playoffs for promotion from 2010–11 Segunda División B to the 2011–12 Segunda División. The four first placed teams in each of the four Segunda División B groups played the Playoffs de Ascenso and the four last placed teams in Segunda División were relegated to Segunda División B. It also decided the two teams which placed 16th to be relegated to the 2011–12 Tercera División.

== Format ==
The four group winners had the opportunity to promote directly and become the overall Segunda División B champion. The four group winners were drawn into a two-legged series where the two winners were promoted to the Segunda División and entered into the final for the Segunda División B champion. The two losing semifinalists entered the playoff round for the last two promotion spots.

The four group runners-up were drawn against one of the three fourth-placed teams outside their group while the four third-placed teams were drawn against each other in a two-legged series. The six winners advanced with the two losing semifinalists to determine the four teams that entered the last two-legged series for the last two promotion spots. In all the playoff series, the lower-ranked club played at home first. Whenever there was a tie in position (e.g. like the group winners in the semifinal round and final or the third-placed teams in the first round), a draw determined the club to play at home first.

== Group winners promotion playoff ==
=== Qualified teams ===
The draw was held in the RFEF headquarters, in Las Rozas (Madrid), on 16 May 2011, 16:30 CEST.

Group	Team
1	Lugo
2	Eibar
3	Sabadell
4	Real Murcia

=== Matches ===
==== Semifinals ====
Team 1	Agg.	Team 2	1st leg	2nd leg
Sabadell	1–1 (a)	Eibar	0–0	1–1
Real Murcia	2–1	Lugo	2–0	0–1

The aggregate winners were promoted and qualified to the 2010–11 Segunda División B Final. The aggregate losers were relegated to the Non-champions promotion play-off Second Round.

===== First leg =====
22 May 2011	Sabadell	0 – 0	Eibar	Sabadell (Barcelona)
19:30 CEST		(Report)		Stadium: Nova Creu Alta; Referee: Sergio Usón Rosel

22 May 2011	Real Murcia	2 – 0	Lugo	Murcia
20:30 CEST	Chando 48'; Isaac 64'	(Report)		Stadium: Nueva Condomina; Referee: Francisco Villena Contreras

===== Second leg =====
28 May 2011	Eibar	1 – 1 (1 – 1 agg.)	Sabadell	Eibar (Gipuzkoa)
18:00 CEST	Lanzarote 71'	(Report)	56' Marc	Stadium: Ipurua; Referee: Alfonso Vicente Moral

29 May 2011	Lugo	1 – 0 (1 – 2 agg.)	Real Murcia	Lugo
17:30 CEST	Tornero 52'	(Report)		Stadium: Anxo Carro; Referee: Ricardo de Burgos Bengoetxea

Promoted to Segunda División
Sabadell (19 years later)	Real Murcia (1 year later)

==== Final ====
Team 1	Agg.	Team 2	1st leg	2nd leg
Sabadell	1–1(8–9 p)	Real Murcia	1–0	0–1

===== First leg =====
4 June 2011	Sabadell	1 – 0	Real Murcia	Sabadell (Barcelona)
20:30 CEST	Isaac 89'	(Report)		Stadium: Nova Creu Alta; Referee: Sebastián Ripoll Solano

===== Second leg =====
12 June 2011	Real Murcia	1 – 0 (a.e.t.) (1 – 1 agg.) (9 – 8 p)	Sabadell	Murcia
18:45 CEST	Aquino 72'	(Report)		Stadium: Nueva Condomina; Referee: Heriberto Ramos Rodríguez
	Penalties
	Kike (penalty scored); Carles (penalty scored); Cañadas (penalty scored); Luciano (penalty scored); Aquino (penalty scored); Isaac (penalty scored); Sánchez (penalty scored); Alberto (penalty scored); Chando (penalty scored)		(penalty scored) Miranda; (penalty scored) Robles; (penalty scored) Cuenca; (penalty scored) Marc; (penalty scored) Bermudo; (penalty scored) Agustín; (penalty scored) Lao; (penalty scored) Puigdollers; (penalty missed) Raúl

Segunda División B
2010–11 Winners
Real Murcia

== Non-champions promotion play-off ==
=== First round ===
==== Qualified teams ====
The draw was held in the RFEF headquarters, in Las Rozas (Madrid), on 16 May 2011, 16:30 CEST.

Position	Group	Team
2nd	1	Guadalajara
2nd	2	Mirandés
2nd	3	Badalona
2nd	4	Sevilla Atlético
3rd	1	Real Madrid Castilla
3rd	2	Alavés
3rd	3	Alcoyano
3rd	4	Melilla
4th	1	Leganés
4th	2	Real Unión
4th	3	Orihuela
4th	4	Cádiz

==== Matches ====
Team 1	Agg.	Team 2	1st leg	2nd leg
Real Unión	2–4	Sevilla Atlético	2–1	0–3
Melilla	1–2	Alavés	1–1	0–1
Real Madrid Castilla	2–4	Alcoyano	0–2	2–2
Leganés	2–2 (a)	Badalona	2–1	0–1
Cádiz	3–4	Mirandés	2–0	1–4
Orihuela	1–3	Guadalajara	0–2	1–1

===== First leg =====
21 May 2011	Melilla	1 – 1	Alavés	Melilla
18:00 CEST	Kabamba 75'	(Report)	45' (pen.) Salcedo	Stadium: Álvarez Claro; Referee: Alfonso Melgares de Aguilar Fernández

22 May 2011	Real Madrid Castilla	0 – 2	Alcoyano	Madrid
12:00 CEST		(Report)	28', 85' Álvaro	Stadium: Santiago Bernabéu; Referee: Juan Francisco García Cabrera

22 May 2011	Orihuela	0 – 2	Guadalajara	Orihuela (Alicante)
17:00 CEST		(Report)	48' Zurdo; 88' Juanjo	Stadium: Los Arcos; Referee: José Emilio Sánchez Aparicio

22 May 2011	Leganés	2 – 1	Badalona	Leganés (Madrid)
19:00 CEST	Ferrán 31'; Arruabarrena 84' (pen.)	(Report)	69' Sellarés	Stadium: Municipal de Butarque; Referee: Fernando Román Román

22 May 2011	Cádiz	2 – 0	Mirandés	Cádiz
19:00 CEST	Cifuentes 5' (pen.); Moreno 83'	(Report)		Stadium: Ramón de Carranza; Referee: Alexandre Alemán Pérez

22 May 2011	Real Unión	2 – 1	Sevilla Atlético	Irún (Gipuzkoa)
19:00 CEST	Romo 54'; Iglesias 89'	(Report)	75' Adri	Stadium: Stadium Gal; Attendance: Víctor Areces Franco

===== Second leg =====
28 May 2011	Sevilla Atlético	3 – 0 (4 – 2 agg.)	Real Unión	Sevilla
18:00 CEST	Deivid 84'; Luis Alberto 90+1'; Morales 90+4'	(Report)		Stadium: José Ramón Cisneros; Referee: Víctor Pérez Peraza

29 May 2011	Alavés	1 – 0 (2 – 1 agg.)	Melilla	Vitoria-Gasteiz (Álava)
18:00 CEST	Martínez 33'	(Report)		Stadium: Mendizorrotza; Referee: Javier Iglesias Villanueva

29 May 2011	Alcoyano	2 – 2 (4 – 2 agg.)	Real Madrid Castilla	Alcoy (Alicante)
19:00 CEST	Paco Esteban 75', 87'	(Report)	46' Morata; 80' Rico	Stadium: El Collao; Referee: Dámaso Arcediano Monescillo

29 May 2011	Badalona	1 – 0 (2 – 2 agg.)	Leganés	Badalona (Barcelona)
19:00 CEST	Vázquez 84'	(Report)		Stadium: Camp del Centenari; Referee: Francisco Javier Mateo Valero

29 May 2011	Mirandés	4 – 1 (4 – 3 agg.)	Cádiz	Miranda del Ebro (Burgos)
19:00 CEST	Arroyo 44', 68'; Baquero 84' (o.g.); Mújica 90+4'	(Report)	82' Pachón	Stadium: Anduva; Referee: Rafael Ruiz Bada

29 May 2011	Guadalajara	1 – 1 (3 – 1 agg.)	Orihuela	Guadalajara
19:30 CEST	Soria 77'	(Report)	79' Garavano	Stadium: Pedro Escartín; Referee: Gustavo Rebollo López

=== Second round ===
==== Qualified teams ====
The draw was held in the RFEF headquarters, in Las Rozas (Madrid), on 30 May 2011, 17:00 CEST.

Group	Position	Team	Notes
1	1st	Lugo	Relegated from group winners promotion playoff
2	1st	Eibar	Relegated from group winners promotion playoff
4	2nd	Sevilla Atlético	
2	3rd	Alavés	
2	2nd	Mirandés	
3	2nd	Badalona	
3	3rd	Alcoyano	
1	2nd	Guadalajara	

==== Matches ====
Team 1	Agg.	Team 2	1st leg	2nd leg
Mirandés	1–0	Badalona	1–0	0–0
Guadalajara	5–4	Sevilla Atlético	4–1	1–3
Alcoyano	1–1 (a)	Eibar	0–0	1–1
Alavés	1–2	Lugo	0–0	1–2

===== First leg =====
5 June 2011	Mirandés	1 – 0	Badalona	Miranda del Ebro (Burgos)
19:00 CEST	Lambarri 90+2'	(Report)		Stadium: Anduva; Referee: David Pérez Pallas

5 June 2011	Guadalajara	4 – 1	Sevilla Atlético	Guadalajara
19:00 CEST	Ernesto 10'; Juanjo 48'; Moreno 59'; Zurdo 63'	(Report)	22' Jairo	Stadium: Pedro Escartín; Referee: Pablo González Fuertes

5 June 2011	Alcoyano	0 – 0	Eibar	Alcoy (Alicante)
20:00 CEST		(Report)		Stadium: El Collao; Referee: José María Sánchez Martínez

5 June 2011	Alavés	0 – 0	Lugo	Vitoria-Gasteiz (Álava)
20:00 CEST		(Report)		Stadium: Mendizorrotza; Referee: Valentín Pizarro Gómez

===== Second leg =====
11 June 2011	Badalona	0 – 0 (0 – 1 agg.)	Mirandés	Badalona (Barcelona)
19:00 CEST		(Report)		Stadium: Camp del Centenari; Referee: Iñaki Bikandi Garrido

12 June 2011	Lugo	2 – 1 (2 – 1 agg.)	Alavés	Lugo
19:00 CEST	González 18'; Arroyo 53'	(Report)	72' Jito	Stadium: Anxo Carro; Referee: Enrique Ortiz Blanco

12 June 2011	Eibar	1 – 1 (1 – 1 agg.)	Alcoyano	Eibar (Gipuzkoa)
19:00 CEST	Lanzarote 17'	(Report)	72' Álvaro	Stadium: Ipurua; Referee: José Luis Munuera Montero

12 June 2011	Sevilla Atlético	3 – 1 (4 – 5 agg.)	Guadalajara	Sevilla
19:00 CEST	Martínez 33'; Campaña 52'; Moreno 90+6' (o.g.)	(Report)	82' (pen.) Ernesto	Stadium: José Ramón Cisneros; Referee: Diego Sebastián López Martínez

=== Third round ===
==== Qualified teams ====
Group	Position	Team
2	2nd	Mirandés
3	3rd	Alcoyano
1	1st	Lugo
1	2nd	Guadalajara

==== Matches ====
Team 1	Agg.	Team 2	1st leg	2nd leg
Guadalajara	2–2 (a)	Mirandés	0–1	2–1
Alcoyano	2–0	Lugo	1–0	1–0

===== First leg =====
19 June 2011	Guadalajara	0 – 1	Mirandés	Guadalajara
19:00 CEST		(Report)	90+3' Pablo	Stadium: Pedro Escartín; Referee: David Medié Jiménez

19 June 2011	Alcoyano	1 – 0	Lugo	Alcoy (Alicante)
20:00 CEST	Fabiani 64'	(Report)		Stadium: El Collao; Referee: Francisco Manuel Arias López

===== Second leg =====
26 June 2011	Mirandés	1 – 2 (2 – 2 agg.)	Guadalajara	Miranda del Ebro (Burgos)
19:00 CEST	Candelas 15'	(Report)	73' Juanjo; 86' (pen.) Ernesto	Stadium: Anduva; Referee: Arturo Guerra Benito

26 June 2011	Lugo	0 – 1 (0 – 2 agg.)	Alcoyano	Lugo
19:00 CEST		(Report)	45' Remón	Stadium: Anxo Carro; Referee: Fernando López Acera

Promoted to Segunda División
Guadalajara (First time ever)	Alcoyano (42 years later)

== Relegation play-off ==
=== Qualified teams ===
The draw was held in the RFEF headquarters, in Las Rozas (Madrid), on 16 May 2011, 16:30 CEST.

Group	Team
1	Conquense
2	Caudal
3	Benidorm
4	Betis B

=== Matches ===
Team 1	Agg.	Team 2	1st leg	2nd leg
Benidorm	2–4	Betis B	1–1	1–3
Conquense	3–2	Caudal	2–0	1–2 (a.e.t.)

==== First leg ====
21 May 2011	Benidorm	1 – 1	Betis B	Benidorm (Alicante)
18:00 CEST	Doménech 60'	(Report)	46' Harper	Stadium: Guillermo Amor; Referee: Hugo José López Puerta

22 May 2011	Conquense	2 – 0	Caudal	Cuenca
17:00 CEST	Berodia 36'; Cristian 48'	(Report)		Stadium: La Fuensanta; Referee: Alonso Vizuete Sánchez

==== Second leg ====
29 May 2011	Betis B	3 – 1 (4 – 2 agg.)	Benidorm	Seville
11:30 CEST	Carlos 14', 62'; Bernal 88'	(Report)	33' Doménech	Stadium: Ciudad Deportiva Real Betis; Referee: Carlos Sánchez Laso

29 May 2011	Caudal	2 – 1 (a.e.t.) (2 – 3 agg.)	Conquense	Mieres (Asturias)
17:00 CEST	Carlos 85'; José Luis 90+6'	(Report)	116' Belencoso	Stadium: Hermanos Antuña; Referee: Óscar Marín Álvarez

Relegated to Tercera División
Benidorm	Caudal

== See also ==
- 2011 Segunda División play-offs
- 2011 Tercera División play-offs
