= Luismi =

Luismi may refer to:

- Luismi (footballer, born 1979), full name Luis Miguel Loro, Spanish former football forward
- Luismi (footballer, born 1983), full name Luis Miguel Gracia Julián, Spanish former football forward/winger
- Luismi (footballer, born 1992), full name Luis Miguel Sánchez Benítez, Spanish football midfielder
- Luis Guillorme (born 1994), Venezuelan-born Spanish professional baseball infielder
- Luismi Quezada, Panama football left back or winger

== See also ==
- Luis Miguel (disambiguation)
