= Mario Marín (footballer) =

Spanish footballer

Personal information
- Full name: Mario Marín Soto
- Date of birth: 4 April 1991 (age 35)
- Place of birth: Murcia, Spain
- Height: 1.72 m (5 ft 8 in)
- Position: Right back

Team information
- Current team: Plus Ultra

Youth career
- 2001–2008: Murcia

Senior career*
Years	Team	Apps	(Gls)
2008–2010	Murcia B	36	(1)
2009–2013	Murcia	37	(0)
2013–2014	Valencia B	33	(0)
2014–2015	Atlético Madrid B	35	(1)
2015–2018	Recreativo	38	(0)
2018–2019	Jumilla	22	(0)
2019–	Plus Ultra	4	(0)
- * Club domestic league appearances and goals as of 20:20, 30 October 2019 (UTC)

Mario Marín Soto (born 4 April 1991) is a Spanish footballer who plays for CD Plus Ultra as a right back.

== Club career ==
Born in Murcia, Marín was a product of Real Murcia's youth system. He made his professional debut on 20 June 2009, appearing in a 1–2 away loss against Córdoba CF in the Segunda División. In January 2010, he signed a three-and-a-half-year professional contract with his hometown club.

In the 2010–11 season, Marín contributed with 11 games as Murcia returned to the second level after one year, as champions. He continued to be sparingly played in the following two campaigns.

On 1 August 2013, Marín signed with Valencia CF Mestalla of the Segunda División B. On 30 July of the following year he moved to another reserve team, Atlético Madrid B also in the third level.

On 18 July 2015, Marín agreed to a three-year deal with Recreativo de Huelva, recently relegated to the third tier.
