= Marc Fernández (footballer) =

Spanish footballer

Personal information
- Full name: Marc Fernández Gracia
- Date of birth: 24 April 1990 (age 36)
- Place of birth: Corbera, Spain
- Height: 1.79 m (5 ft 10 in)
- Position: Winger

Team information
- Current team: Cornellà

Youth career
- 1999–2000: Pubilla Casas
- 2000–2001: Ferrán Martorell
- 2001–2002: Cornellà
- 2002–2003: Barcelona
- 2003–2006: Cornellà
- 2006–2008: Sant Andreu
- 2008–2009: Zaragoza

Senior career*
Years	Team	Apps	(Gls)
2009–2011	Sabadell	34	(4)
2009–2010	→ Europa (loan)	32	(5)
2011–2012	Cartagena	17	(0)
2012–2013	Mallorca B	28	(4)
2012–2013	Mallorca	6	(0)
2014	Bnei Sakhnin	12	(1)
2014–2015	Espanyol B	29	(0)
2015–2016	Sabadell	31	(9)
2016–2017	Llagostera	35	(9)
2017–2018	UCAM Murcia	35	(12)
2018–2020	Asteras Tripolis	51	(11)
2020–2021	Apollon Smyrnis	29	(4)
2021–2022	Andorra	46	(11)
2023–2025	Gimnàstic	92	(13)
2025–	Cornellà	19	(4)
- * Club domestic league appearances and goals as of 13:21, 11 February 2026 (UTC)

Marc Fernández Gracia (born 24 April 1990) is a Spanish professional footballer who plays as a right winger for Tercera Federación club Cornellà.

== Club career ==
=== Spain ===
Born in Corbera de Llobregat, Barcelona, Catalonia, Fernández made his senior debut in 2009–10, with Tercera División club CE Europa on loan from CE Sabadell FC. After playing regularly for the latter during the following season and scoring five goals, including one against SD Eibar during the promotion play-offs (1–1 away draw, qualification on the away goals rule), he signed with Segunda División team FC Cartagena unilaterally on 8 July 2011 when his contract had recently been renewed; eventually, the Liga Nacional de Fútbol Profesional sided with the player.

Fernández joined RCD Mallorca on 10 July 2012, being initially assigned to the reserves who competed in the third level. He made his La Liga debut for the first team on 18 August, coming on as a 74th-minute substitute for Emilio Nsue in a 2–1 home victory over RCD Espanyol.

On 14 January 2014, after an aborted transfer to Espanyol, Fernández moved abroad and signed for Bnei Sakhnin F.C. in the Israeli Premier League. He returned to the former club in the summer, however, joining its B side.

Fernández continued competing in the Spanish third tier the following years, representing in quick succession Sabadell, UE Llagostera and UCAM Murcia CF.

=== Greece ===
On 31 May 2018, the 28-year-old Fernández agreed to a two-year deal at Super League Greece's Asteras Tripolis FC. He finished his first year with eight goals in all competitions.

Fernández scored his first goal for the 2019–20 campaign on 15 September 2019, in a 2–1 away loss against Xanthi FC. Six days later, his brace helped the hosts to a 2–1 home defeat of Atromitos FC.

On 8 September 2020, Fernández joined Apollon Smyrnis F.C. on a free transfer. His first goal for the club came through a header in a 3–4 home loss to AEK Athens F.C. on 13 December, and the following week his 36th-minute strike proved essential to the 1–0 win over Panetolikos FC.

=== Return home ===
In June 2021, Fernández joined FC Andorra in the newly created Primera División RFEF. He helped the club in their first-ever promotion to the professional leagues in his first season, scoring a squad-best 11 goals.

On 29 December 2022, Fernández signed for third-division Gimnàstic de Tarragona.
