= Luis Miguel (disambiguation) =

Luis Miguel (born 1970) is a Mexican singer.

Luis Miguel may also refer to:

- Luis Miguel (album), a 2010 album by Luis Miguel
- Luis Miguel (TV series), a 2018 biographical television series

== People with the given name ==
- Alhandra (footballer) (born 1979), full name Luís Miguel Assunção Joaquim, Portuguese footballer
- Luis Miguel Dominguín (1926–1996), bullfighter from Spain
- Luis Miguel Escalada (born 1986), Argentine footballer
- Luis Miguel Martín (born 1972), Spanish runner
- Luis Miguel Sánchez Cerro (1889–1933), President of Peru
- Luismi (footballer, born 1979), full name Luis Miguel Loro Santiago, Spanish footballer
- Luismi (footballer, born 1983), full name Luis Miguel Gracia Julián, Spanish footballer
- Luismi Quezada (born 1996), full name Luis Miguel Quezada Sánchez, Dominican footballer
- Luis Miguel Hernández (born 1985), Salvadoran footballer
- Luís Miguel (footballer, born 1970), full name Luís Miguel Moreira da Silva, Portuguese footballer and manager
- Luís Miguel (footballer, born 1971), full name Luís Miguel da Fonseca Silva Costa, Angolan footballer and manager
- Luís Miguel (footballer, born 1972), full name Luís Miguel Fontes Martins, Portuguese retired footballer
- Luís Miguel (footballer, born 1979), full name Luís Miguel da Costa Lobo, Portuguese retired footballer
- Luís Miguel (footballer, born 1991), full name Luís Miguel Silva Mendonça, Portuguese footballer
- Luis Miguel (footballer, born 2005), full name Luis Miguel Borges de Paula, Brazilian footballer
- Luís Miguel (tennis), Brazilian tennis player
- Mano (Portuguese footballer) (born 1987), full name Luís Miguel Lopes Mendes, Portuguese footballer
- Miguel Barbosa Huerta (born 1959), full name Luis Miguel Gerónimo Barbosa Huerta, Mexican politician
- Miguel Monteiro (born 1980), full name Luís Miguel Brito Garcia Monteiro, Portuguese footballer
