= Adri Pavón =

Spanish footballer

Personal information
- Full name: Adrián Pavón Leiva
- Date of birth: 16 March 1989 (age 37)
- Place of birth: Seville, Spain
- Height: 1.80 m (5 ft 11 in)
- Position: Midfielder

Youth career
- 2007–2008: Sevilla

Senior career*
Years	Team	Apps	(Gls)
2008–2009	Sevilla C		
2008–2011	Sevilla B	47	(6)
2011–2012	San Roque	28	(2)
2012–2013	Lucena	15	(2)
2013–	Mairena		(10)
- * Club domestic league appearances and goals as of 12:45, 25 October 2014 (UTC)

Adrián "Adri" Pavón Leiva (born 16 March 1989) is a Spanish professional footballer who plays for Mairena.
