= Francisco Jusué =

Spanish footballer

Personal information
- Full name: Francisco Javier Jusué Garcés
- Date of birth: 30 November 1979 (age 46)
- Place of birth: Tudela, Spain
- Height: 1.79 m (5 ft 10 1/2 in)
- Position: Centre-back

Youth career
- Jesuitas
- Muskaria
- Valtierrano
- Osasuna

Senior career*
Years	Team	Apps	(Gls)
1997–2001	Osasuna B	100	(3)
1997–2005	Osasuna	38	(2)
2003	→ Getafe (loan)	20	(0)
2004	→ Recreativo (loan)	1	(0)
2004–2005	→ Cultural Leonesa (loan)	16	(0)
2005–2007	S.S. Reyes	40	(1)
2007–2008	Logroñés	29	(0)
2008–2009	Izarra		
2009–2010	Lourdes		
2010–2012	Egüés	?	(3)

International career
1997	Spain U17	5	(1)
1996–1998	Spain U18	14	(0)
1998–1999	Spain U20	13	(1)
1999–2001	Spain U21	13	(1)
Medal record
Representing Spain
Men's football
FIFA World Youth Championship
Winner	1999 Nigeria
- * Club domestic league appearances and goals

Francisco Javier Jusué Garcés (born 30 November 1979) is a Spanish former professional footballer who played as a central defender.

== Club career ==
Jusué was born in Tudela, Navarre. At the professional level, he represented mainly local giants CA Osasuna, but only totalled seven games with the first team in his first four years as a senior, with the club in the Segunda División. From 2000 to 2002, with them back in La Liga, he ironically played more; he made his debut in the latter competition on 10 February 2001, featuring the full 90 minutes in a 2–1 away loss against Rayo Vallecano. He scored his first goal on 10 June that year, the only in the 1–0 home win over Real Zaragoza.

After a series of loans, mainly in the second tier, Jusué was released by Osasuna in the summer of 2005, resuming his career in the Segunda División B or lower.

== International career ==
Jusué was selected by Spain to the 1999 FIFA World Youth Championship in Nigeria. He and David Bermudo were the only members of the squad to take part in all the matches and minutes for the champions.

== Honours ==
Spain U20

- FIFA World Youth Championship: 1999
