= Óscar Valero =

Spanish footballer

Personal information
- Full name: Óscar Valero Navarro
- Date of birth: 28 August 1985 (age 41)
- Place of birth: Zaragoza, Spain
- Height: 1.80 m (5 ft 11 in)
- Position: Right back

Youth career
- Casetas

Senior career*
Years	Team	Apps	(Gls)
2002–2004	Casetas		
2004–2005	Mirandés	30	(2)
2005–2009	Zaragoza B	130	(14)
2007–2008	Zaragoza	4	(0)
2009–2010	Atlético Ciudad	32	(1)
2010–2011	Benidorm	33	(0)
2011–2015	Guijuelo	136	(15)
2015–2016	Tudelano	36	(3)
2016–2017	Ebro	26	(1)
2017–2019	Ejea	45	(0)
2019–2020	San Juan de Mozarrifar	26	(4)
2020–2022	Épila	31	(1)
2022–2023	Borja		
- * Club domestic league appearances and goals

Óscar Valero Navarro (born 28 August 1985) is a Spanish former footballer who played as a right defender.

== Club career ==
Born in Zaragoza, Aragon, Valero started playing senior football with local UD Casetas in the 2002–03 season, in Tercera División. In 2004, he joined CD Mirandés, in Segunda División B.

In 2005 summer Valero signed with Real Zaragoza, being initially assigned to the reserves also in the third level. On 25 November 2007 he made his first-team – and La Liga debut, starting in a 1–1 home draw against Getafe CF; he finished the season with just four appearances, totalling 185 minutes of action, and the main squad also suffered relegation.

Valero was released by Zaragoza in 2009, and went on to resume his career in the third level, representing CF Atlético Ciudad, Benidorm CF and CD Guijuelo.
