= Agustín Fernández (footballer) =

Spanish footballer (born 1982)

Personal information
- Full name: Agustín Javier Fernández Charro
- Date of birth: 15 March 1982 (age 44)
- Place of birth: Mérida, Spain
- Height: 1.88 m (6 ft 2 in)
- Position: Centre back

Youth career
- CP Mérida

Senior career*
Years	Team	Apps	(Gls)
1999–2001	Mérida		
2001–2003	Real Madrid C		
2003–2004	Badajoz B		
2004–2006	Badajoz	52	(1)
2006–2007	Eldense	29	(0)
2007–2008	Palencia	24	(1)
2008–2012	Sabadell	117	(8)
2012–2013	Alavés	23	(0)
2013–2014	Racing Santander	14	(1)
2014	Olot	10	(2)
2014–2015	Hospitalet	33	(4)
2015–2016	Sabadell	26	(0)
2016	Gavà	9	(0)
2017–2018	Manresa	19	(0)
2018–2020	Montañesa	31	(2)
- * Club domestic league appearances and goals

Agustín Javier Fernández Charro (born 15 March 1982), known simply as Agustín, is a Spanish former footballer who played as a central defender.

== Football career ==
Born in Mérida, Extremadura, Agustín began his career at hometown club CP Mérida and made his senior debut with its successor Mérida UD in Tercera División in 1999, also playing at Real Madrid C. After transferring to CD Badajoz in 2003, he went on to spend the vast majority of his career in Segunda División B with nine different teams, making over 300 appearances in the category. Following CF Palencia's relegation in 2008, he joined CE Sabadell FC, helping them gain promotion to Segunda División in the 2010–11 season.

Aged nearly 30, Agustín played his first professional game with the Catalans on 4 February 2012, by featuring for the full 90 minutes in their away goalless draw against SD Huesca. On 7 April, he was sent off near the end of a 1–0 win over regional rivals Gimnàstic de Tarragona at the Estadi de la Nova Creu Alta for aggression against Mikel Orbegozo; he totalled 16 appearances over the campaign, equalising in a 1–2 loss to Celta de Vigo on 5 May.

Agustín joined third level side Deportivo Alavés on 4 July 2012, helping to promotion his only season and repeating the feat with Racing de Santander in the following year. Subsequently, he represented a host of clubs in division three.

On 3 October 2018, Fernández signed for CF Montañesa.
