= Joaquín (footballer, born 1982) =

Spanish retired footballer

Personal information
- Full name: Joaquín Rodríguez Espinar
- Date of birth: 28 November 1982 (age 43)
- Place of birth: Paradas, Spain
- Height: 1.82 m (6 ft 0 in)
- Position: Forward

Youth career
- Sevilla

Senior career*
| Years | Team | Apps | (Gls) |
| 2001–2003 | Sevilla B | 23 | (3) |
| 2001–2002 | → Conquense (loan) | 26 | (3) |
| 2003–2004 | Cacereño | 26 | (7) |
| 2004–2005 | Fuerteventura | 23 | (1) |
| 2005–2006 | Eivissa | | |
| 2006–2007 | Los Palacios | 33 | (11) |
| 2007–2008 | Mairena | 36 | (14) |
| 2008–2010 | San Roque | 69 | (40) |
| 2010–2012 | Sabadell | 16 | (2) |
| Total | | 252 | (81) |
- * Club domestic league appearances and goals

Joaquín Rodríguez Espinar (born 28 November 1982 in Paradas, Seville, Andalusia), known simply as Joaquín, is a Spanish former footballer who played as a forward.
