= CD Mairena =

Spanish football club

Mairena
- Full name: Club Deportivo Mairena
- Nicknames: Maireneros, Blanquinegros, Los del San Bartolomé
- Founded: 1922
- Ground: San Bartolomé, Mairena, Andalusia, Spain
- Capacity: 6,000
- Chairman: (Spain) Francisco Sánchez
- Manager: (Spain) Alonso Ramírez
- League: Primera Andaluza Sevilla
- 2024–25: Primera Andaluza Sevilla, 8th of 16
Home colours	Away colours

Club Deportivo Mairena is a Spanish football team based in Mairena del Alcor, in the autonomous community of Andalusia. Founded in 1922, it plays in Primera Andaluza Sevilla, holding home games at Estadio Nuevo San Bartolomé, with a capacity of 6,000 seats.

== Season to season ==
Season	Tier	Division	Place	Copa del Rey
1929–1946	—	Regional	—	
1946–47	4	1ª Reg.	7th	
1947–1962	—	Regional	—	
1962–63	4	1ª Reg.	7th	
1963–64	4	1ª Reg.	6th	
1964–65	4	1ª Reg.	6th	
1965–1971	—	Regional	—	
1971–72	5	2ª Reg.	6th	
1972–73	5	2ª Reg.	3rd	
1973–74	5	2ª Reg.	7th	
1974–75	5	2ª Reg.	15th	
1975–76	6	2ª Reg.		
1976–77	6	2ª Reg.		
1977–78	7	2ª Reg.		
1978–79	7	2ª Reg.	2nd	
1979–80	7	2ª Reg.	3rd	
1980–81	6	1ª Reg.	1st	
1981–82	5	Reg. Pref.	9th	
1982–83	5	Reg. Pref.	1st	
1983–84	4	3ª	5th	

Season	Tier	Division	Place	Copa del Rey
1984–85	4	3ª	5th	First round
1985–86	4	3ª	7th	First round
1986–87	4	3ª	14th	
1987–88	4	3ª	19th	
1988–89	5	Reg. Pref.	9th	
1989–90	5	Reg. Pref.	1st	
1990–91	4	3ª	9th	
1991–92	4	3ª	6th	
1992–93	4	3ª	2nd	First round
1993–94	4	3ª	11th	Second round
1994–95	4	3ª	11th	
1995–96	4	3ª	15th	
1996–97	4	3ª	20th	
1997–98	5	Reg. Pref.	12th	
1998–99	5	Reg. Pref.	8th	
1999–2000	5	Reg. Pref.	3rd	
2000–01	5	Reg. Pref.	4th	
2001–02	5	Reg. Pref.	14th	
2002–03	5	Reg. Pref.	6th	
2003–04	5	Reg. Pref.	3rd	

Season	Tier	Division	Place	Copa del Rey
2004–05	5	1ª And.	1st	
2005–06	4	3ª	15th	
2006–07	4	3ª	10th	
2007–08	4	3ª	10th	
2008–09	4	3ª	8th	
2009–10	4	3ª	2nd	
2010–11	4	3ª	4th	
2011–12	4	3ª	3rd	
2012–13	4	3ª	4th	
2013–14	4	3ª	5th	
2014–15	4	3ª	18th	
2015–16	5	1ª And.	15th	
2016–17	6	1ª And.	9th	
2017–18	6	1ª And.	11th	
2018–19	6	1ª And.	11th	
2019–20	6	1ª And.	5th	
2020–21	6	1ª And.	3rd	
2021–22	7	1ª And.	3rd	
2022–23	7	1ª And.	4th	
2023–24	7	1ª And.	3rd	

Season	Tier	Division	Place	Copa del Rey
2024–25	7	1ª And.	8th	
2025–26	7	1ª And.		

- 19 seasons in Tercera División

== Former players ==
- (Spain) Sergio León
- (Spain) Joaquín Rodríguez
- (Spain) Rubén Jurado
