= Alberto Manga =

Spanish footballer

Personal information
- Full name: Agustín Alberto Manga Magro
- Date of birth: 21 May 1980 (age 46)
- Place of birth: Granollers, Spain
- Height: 1.79 m (5 ft 10 1/2 in)
- Position: Midfielder

Youth career
- 1996–1998: Barcelona

Senior career*
Years	Team	Apps	(Gls)
1997–2000	Barcelona C	77	(21)
2000–2004	Barcelona B	63	(3)
2002	→ Cartagonova (loan)	19	(1)
2002–2003	→ Mataró (loan)	33	(0)
2004–2008	Gavà	139	(29)
2008–2010	Girona	31	(3)
2010–2011	Sabadell	16	(0)
2011–2012	Badalona	28	(11)
2012–2013	Hospitalet	22	(0)
2013–2014	Santboià	24	(4)
2014–2015	Palamós	23	(3)
2015–2016	Vilassar Mar	2	(2)

International career
1998	Spain U17	1	(0)
1998	Spain U18	1	(0)
- * Club domestic league appearances and goals

Agustín Alberto Manga Magro (born 21 May 1980) is a Spanish former footballer who played as a midfielder.
