= Óscar Sánchez (footballer, born 1979) =

Spanish footballer

Personal information
- Full name: Óscar Sánchez Fuentes
- Date of birth: 19 December 1979 (age 46)
- Place of birth: Murcia, Spain
- Height: 1.77 m (5 ft 10 in)
- Position: Left-back

Team information
- Current team: Valencia B (manager)

Youth career
- Atlético Madrid

Senior career*
Years	Team	Apps	(Gls)
1997–1999	Amorós		
1999–2001	Atlético Madrid B	71	(8)
2001	Jaén	0	(0)
2001–2002	Badajoz	34	(3)
2002–2009	Valladolid	140	(6)
2009–2014	Murcia	127	(9)
Total		372	(26)

Managerial career
- 2014–2017: Murcia (assistant)
- 2017: Elche (assistant)
- 2018: Sochaux (assistant)
- 2018–2020: Cultural Leonesa (assistant)
- 2020–2021: Marbella (assistant)
- 2021–2023: Orihuela
- 2024–2026: Valencia (youth)
- 2026–: Valencia B
- 2026: Valencia (caretaker)
- * Club domestic league appearances and goals

Óscar Sánchez Fuentes (born 19 December 1979) is a Spanish former professional footballer who played usually as a left-back. He is currently manager of Valencia Mestalla.

== Playing career ==
Sánchez was born in Murcia. After stints with Atlético Madrid's C and B teams and Segunda División side Badajoz, he joined Real Valladolid in 2002, where he was regularly used as a defensive backup. He made his La Liga debut on 28 September 2002, playing three minutes in a 1–1 home draw against Real Madrid.

Sánchez helped Valladolid to achieve top-flight promotion in the 2006–07 season, participating in 21 league matches (1,262 minutes) the following campaign. After seven years, he signed for hometown club Real Murcia on a free transfer, appearing in less than half of the games in his first year as his team suffered relegation from the second tier but being first-choice in the next in an immediate promotion.

On 22 October 2011, Sánchez scored a brace in a 3–1 home win over Villarreal B. He netted a career-best seven goals that season, helping Murcia to narrowly escape relegation.

== Coaching career ==
After retiring at the age of 34, Sánchez was assistant manager in several teams under José Manuel Aira; at Murcia, he was second-in-command to both Aira and Vicente Mir. For a brief period of time, he also worked as that club's director of football.

On 17 November 2021, Sánchez was named head coach of Orihuela in the Tercera División RFEF. He led the side to promotion to Segunda Federación in 2023, but was dismissed on 11 December of that year.

Sánchez was subsequently in charge of Valencia's youth and senior reserve teams. On 13 September 2026, he was appointed caretaker manager of the main squad following the sacking of Carlos Corberán. Two days later, on his debut, he oversaw a 1–0 away victory against Alavés.

== Managerial statistics ==
As of 26 April 2026

Managerial record by team and tenure
Team	Nat	From	To	Record								Ref
Team	Nat	From	To	G	W	D	L	GF	GA	GD	Win %	Ref
Orihuela	(Spain)	16 November 2021	12 December 2023	73	36	14	23	103	78	+25	49.32	
Valencia B	(Spain)	24 March 2026	Present	5	4	0	1	18	7	+11	80.00	
Total				78	40	14	24	121	85	+36	51.28	—

== Honours ==
Valladolid

- Segunda División: 2006–07

Murcia

- Segunda División B: 2010–11
