= David Bermudo =

Spanish former footballer

Personal information
- Full name: David Bermudo Rubio
- Date of birth: 14 January 1979 (age 47)
- Place of birth: Santa Coloma, Spain
- Height: 1.75 m (5 ft 9 in)
- Position: Left-back

Youth career
- 1992–1997: Barcelona

Senior career*
Years	Team	Apps	(Gls)
1997–1999	Barcelona C	68	(0)
1999–2001	Barcelona B	61	(0)
2001	Barcelona	0	(0)
2001–2005	Tenerife	30	(0)
2004	→ Algeciras (loan)	9	(0)
2005–2007	Almería	29	(0)
2007–2009	Pontevedra	55	(0)
2009–2012	Sabadell	73	(1)
2012–2015	Badalona	80	(0)
Total		405	(1)

International career
1999	Spain U20	7	(0)
1999–2001	Spain U21	11	(0)
Medal record
Representing Spain
Men's football
FIFA World Youth Championship
Winner	1999 Nigeria
- * Club domestic league appearances and goals

David Bermudo Rubio (born 14 January 1979) is a Spanish former professional footballer who played as a left-back.

== Club career ==
Born in Santa Coloma de Gramenet, Barcelona, Catalonia, Bermudo was an unsuccessful youth graduate at local giants FC Barcelona's La Masia, leaving in 2001 to sign for CD Tenerife, recently returned to La Liga. He made his debut in the competition on 26 August 2001 in a 0–2 home loss against Deportivo Alavés, making a mere 12 appearances in the season while being booked four times as the club was immediately relegated.

Subsequently, Bermudo resumed his career in the Segunda División, representing in the following five years Algeciras CF (loaned), Tenerife and UD Almería. He achieved another top-flight promotion with the latter side in 2007, but only appeared in five matches during the campaign.

Bermudo joined Pontevedra CF in the Segunda División B in summer 2007, moving to CE Sabadell FC of the same league two years later. In June 2011, after securing promotion to the second tier, he renewed his contract for another season.

== International career ==
Bermudo was part of the Spain squad at the 1999 FIFA World Youth Championship. Alongside Francisco Jusué, he played all the games and minutes for the champions.

== Honours ==
Spain U20

- FIFA World Youth Championship: 1999
