= Javi Martínez (footballer, born 1 July 1988) =

Spanish footballer

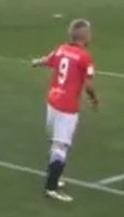
- Martínez playing for Gimnàstic in 2013

Personal information
- Full name: Francisco Javier Martínez Rodríguez
- Date of birth: 1 July 1988 (age 38)
- Place of birth: Seville, Spain
- Height: 1.71 m (5 ft 7 in)
- Position: Midfielder

Youth career
- Sevilla

Senior career*
Years	Team	Apps	(Gls)
2007–2009	Sevilla C	69	(9)
2009–2011	Sevilla B	53	(8)
2011–2012	Huesca	13	(1)
2012	Zaragoza B	15	(2)
2012	Orihuela	18	(3)
2013–2014	Gimnàstic	33	(2)
2015	Hospitalet	12	(1)
2015–2016	Europa	7	(7)
Total		220	(33)
- * Club domestic league appearances and goals

Francisco Javier 'Javi' Martínez Rodríguez (born 1 July 1988) is a Spanish retired footballer who played as a right midfielder.

== Club career ==
Born in Seville, Andalusia, Martínez finished his youth career with local giants Sevilla. He made his senior debuts in 2007 with the C-team and, on 7 June 2009, played for Sevilla Atlético against Huesca in what was his first Segunda División appearance, featuring 90 minutes in the 0–3 away loss; in the following two Segunda División B seasons he was a regular starter for B's, scoring five goals in the first.

On 30 June 2011, Martínez was released by Sevilla and signed a deal with Huesca on 16 July. However, in the following transfer window, he cut ties with the latter club and joined Real Zaragoza B.

In September 2012, Martínez signed with Orihuela in the third level. He terminated his contract on 3 January of the following year, moving to Gimnàstic de Tarragona five days later.

On 30 December 2014, after struggling with injuries, Martínez was released. He signed for fellow league team L'Hospitalet on 12 January 2015 and, the ensuing summer, moved abroad for the first time at the age of 27, joining a host of compatriots at Europa from the Gibraltar Premier Division.

On 10 August 2016, Martínez announced his retirement at the age of 28.
