= Dani Fernández (footballer, born 1987) =

Spanish footballer

Personal information
- Full name: Daniel Fernández Navarro
- Date of birth: 29 January 1987 (age 39)
- Place of birth: Alcoy, Spain
- Height: 1.77 m (5 ft 10 in)
- Position: Midfielder

Youth career
- Alcoyano

Senior career*
| Years | Team | Apps | (Gls) |
| 2005–2007 | Alcoyano B | | |
| 2005–2007 | Alcoyano | 5 | (0) |
| 2007–2010 | Dénia | 67 | (3) |
| 2010–2011 | Alcoyano | 37 | (1) |
| 2012 | Gandía | 14 | (0) |
| 2012–2013 | Alcoyano | 3 | (0) |
| 2014 | Ontinyent | 16 | (0) |
| 2014–2015 | Muro | 23 | (0) |
| 2015– | L'Olleria | 6 | (0) |
- * Club domestic league appearances and goals as of 18 June 2017

Daniel 'Dani' Fernández Navarro (born 29 January 1987 in Alcoy, Alcoià, Valencian Community) is a Spanish footballer who plays for L'Olleria CF as a midfielder.
