= 2010–11 Segunda División B =

Segunda División B
- Season: 2010–11
- Champions: Real Murcia
- Promoted: Real Murcia; Sabadell; Guadalajara; Alcoyano

The 2010–11 Segunda División B season is the 34th since its establishment. The first matches of the season were played on 28 August 2010, and the season ended on 26 June 2011 with the promotion play-off finals.

== Group 1 ==
- Teams from Canary Islands, Castile-La Mancha, Community of Madrid, Extremadura and Galicia.

=== Summary before 2010–11 season ===
- Scores and Classification - Group 1
- Playoffs de Ascenso:
  - SD Ponferradina - Promoted to Segunda División
  - SD Eibar - Eliminated in Second Round
  - CF Palencia - Eliminated in First Round
  - Pontevedra CF - Eliminated in Second Round

- Promoted to This Group From Tercera División:
  - Badajoz - Founded in: 1905//, Based in: Badajoz, Extremadura//, Promoted From: Group 14
  - Coruxo - Founded in: 1930//, Based in: Vigo, Galicia//, Promoted From: Group 1
  - Deportivo B - Founded in: 1964//, Based in: A Coruña, Galicia//, Promoted From: Group 1
  - Extremadura - Founded in: 2007//, Based in: Almendralejo, Extremadura//, Promoted From: Group 14
  - Getafe B - Founded in: 1983//, Based in: Getafe, Community of Madrid//, Promoted From: Group 7
  - Rayo B - Founded in: 1956//, Based in: Madrid, Community of Madrid//, Promoted From: Group 7

- Relegated to This Group From Segunda División:
  - None

- Relegated to Tercera División:
  - Sestao River - Founded in: 1996//, Based in: Sestao, Basque Country//, Relegated to: Group 4
  - Izarra - Founded in: 1924//, Based in: Estella-Lizarra, Navarre//, Relegated to: Group 15
  - Racing de Ferrol - Founded in: 1919//, Based in: Ferrol, Galicia//, Relegated to: Group 1
  - Compostela - Founded in: 1962//, Based in: Santiago de Compostela, Galicia//, Relegated to: Group 1

=== Stadia and locations ===
Location of teams in Segunda División B Gr. 1 2010–11
Canary Islands

| Team | Founded | Home city | Stadium | Capacity |
|---|---|---|---|---|
| Alcalá | 1929 | Alcalá de Henares, Community of Madrid | Municipal del Val | 6,000 |
| Atlético B | 1970 | Madrid, Community of Madrid | Cerro del Espino | 4,000 |
| Badajoz | 1905 | Badajoz, Extremadura | Nuevo Vivero | 15,000 |
| Cacereño | 1919 | Cáceres, Extremadura | Príncipe Felipe | 7,000 |
| Celta B | 1988 | Vigo, Galicia | Barreiro | 4,500 |
| Cerro Reyes | 1980 | Badajoz, Extremadura | José Pache | 3,500 |
| Conquense | 1946 | Cuenca, Castile-La Mancha | La Fuensanta | 3,500 |
| Coruxo | 1930 | Coruxo, Vigo, Galicia | O Vao | 1,200 |
| Deportivo B | 1964 | A Coruña, Galicia | El Mundo del Fútbol | 3,000 |
| Extremadura | 2007 | Almendralejo, Extremadura | Francisco de la Hera | 11,500 |
| Getafe B | 1983 | Getafe, Community of Madrid | Ciudad Deportiva | 1,500 |
| Guadalajara | 1947 | Guadalajara, Castile-La Mancha | Pedro Escartín | 5,000 |
| Leganés | 1928 | Leganés, Community of Madrid | Butarque | 8,000 |
| Lugo | 1953 | Lugo, Galicia | Angel Carro | 6,000 |
| Montañeros | 1977 | A Coruña, Galicia | Campo de Elviña Grande | 1,200 |
| Pontevedra | 1941 | Pontevedra, Galicia | Pasarón | 12,500 |
| Rayo B | 1956 | Madrid, Community of Madrid | Ciudad Deportiva | 800 |
| Real Madrid Castilla | 1930 | Madrid, Community of Madrid | Alfredo di Stéfano | 6,000 |
| Universidad LPGC | 1994 | Las Palmas, Canary Islands | Pepe Gonçalvez | 3,000 |
| Vecindario | 1942 | Santa Lucía de Tirajana, Canary Islands | Municipal de Vecindario | 4,500 |

=== League table ===
| Pos | Team | Pld | W | D | L | GF | GA | GD | Pts | Qualification or relegation |
|---|---|---|---|---|---|---|---|---|---|---|
| 1 | Lugo (C) | 38 | 22 | 9 | 7 | 64 | 39 | +25 | 75 | Qualification to group champions' playoffs |
| 2 | Guadalajara (P) | 38 | 21 | 10 | 7 | 62 | 25 | +37 | 73 | Qualification to promotion playoffs |
| 3 | Real Madrid Castilla | 38 | 21 | 8 | 9 | 73 | 38 | +35 | 71 | Qualification to promotion playoffs |
| 4 | Leganés | 38 | 20 | 9 | 9 | 54 | 35 | +19 | 69 | Qualification to promotion playoffs |
| 5 | Universidad LPGC (Note: Universidad LPGC was dissolved after the end of the season.) (D) | 38 | 18 | 8 | 12 | 41 | 43 | −2 | 62 | |
| 6 | Rayo Vallecano B | 38 | 16 | 10 | 12 | 41 | 34 | +7 | 58 | |
| 7 | Getafe B | 38 | 15 | 9 | 14 | 45 | 45 | 0 | 54 | |
| 8 | Alcalá | 38 | 13 | 13 | 12 | 38 | 39 | −1 | 52 | Qualification to Copa del Rey |
| 9 | Celta B | 38 | 15 | 7 | 16 | 43 | 52 | −9 | 52 | |
| 10 | Vecindario | 38 | 13 | 12 | 13 | 37 | 53 | −16 | 51 | Qualification to Copa del Rey |
| 11 | Atlético B | 38 | 13 | 11 | 14 | 43 | 43 | 0 | 50 | |
| 12 | Montañeros | 38 | 13 | 10 | 15 | 50 | 53 | −3 | 49 | |
| 13 | Cacereño | 38 | 11 | 15 | 12 | 34 | 33 | +1 | 48 | |
| 14 | Coruxo | 38 | 11 | 14 | 13 | 40 | 41 | −1 | 47 | |
| 15 | Badajoz | 38 | 12 | 11 | 15 | 41 | 44 | −3 | 47 | |
| 16 | Conquense | 38 | 11 | 14 | 13 | 47 | 43 | +4 | 47 | Qualification to relegation playoffs |
| 17 | Deportivo B (R) | 38 | 12 | 9 | 17 | 47 | 57 | −10 | 45 | Relegation to Tercera División |
| 18 | Pontevedra (R) | 38 | 10 | 9 | 19 | 38 | 49 | −11 | 39 | Relegation to Tercera División |
| 19 | Extremadura (R) | 38 | 8 | 8 | 22 | 29 | 50 | −21 | 32 | Relegation to Tercera División |
| 20 | Cerro Reyes (Note: Cerro Reyes retired from the competition due to their non-appearance for two matches in a row, leading to their relegation to Regional Preferente de Extremadura for not paying its players.) (R) | 38 | 5 | 4 | 29 | 20 | 71 | −51 | 16 (Note: 3 points deducted?) | Relegation to Tercera División |

Rules for classification: 1st points; 2nd head-to-head; 3rd goal difference; 4th goals scored
(C) Champions; (D) Dissolved; (P) Promoted; (R) Relegated

=== Results ===
| Home \ Away | ALC | ATM | BDJ | CAC | CEL | CRB | CQS | COR | DEP | EXT | GET | GUA | LEG | LUG | MON | PON | RVB | RMC | ULP | VEC |
|---|---|---|---|---|---|---|---|---|---|---|---|---|---|---|---|---|---|---|---|---|
| Alcalá | — | 1–1 | 0–3 | 1–1 | 0–0 | 4–1 | 0–0 | 2–1 | 2–2 | 1–0 | 3–0 | 0–0 | 0–3 | 0–1 | 1–0 | 1–0 | 1–0 | 0–2 | 0–0 | 2–0 |
| Atlético B | 0–0 | — | 1–0 | 1–0 | 5–1 | 2–0 | 0–2 | 1–1 | 1–0 | 2–1 | 3–2 | 0–0 | 1–0 | 1–2 | 3–1 | 2–1 | 1–0 | 0–0 | 2–2 | 1–2 |
| Badajoz | 2–1 | 1–0 | — | 1–2 | 0–4 | 1–2 | 1–1 | 1–2 | 0–1 | 0–0 | 0–0 | 2–0 | 1–2 | 3–1 | 1–1 | 3–1 | 0–1 | 1–3 | 1–0 | 4–0 |
| Cacereño | 0–0 | 1–1 | 0–0 | — | 2–0 | 2–0 | 1–1 | 1–1 | 1–1 | 1–0 | 4–1 | 0–2 | 0–0 | 1–0 | 1–1 | 0–0 | 0–0 | 0–1 | 1–2 | 0–0 |
| Celta B | 0–0 | 3–1 | 0–0 | 1–0 | — | 2–0 | 1–0 | 0–0 | 1–0 | 2–1 | 2–0 | 0–4 | 3–3 | 0–3 | 2–2 | 0–1 | 2–0 | 0–2 | 4–0 | 2–3 |
| Cerro Reyes | 0–2 | 2–0 | 0–2 | 0–1 | 1–1 | — | 0–2 | 1–2 | 0–2 | 0–2 | 1–1 | 0–0 | 1–3 | 2–1 | 2–2 | 2–1 | 2–3 | 0–2 | 0–2 | 0–3 |
| Conquense | 1–0 | 1–1 | 2–3 | 1–1 | 3–2 | 3–0 | — | 3–1 | 2–0 | 1–1 | 3–0 | 1–2 | 0–2 | 1–1 | 0–1 | 0–1 | 2–3 | 2–2 | 1–1 | 3–1 |
| Coruxo | 0–1 | 0–0 | 0–0 | 2–1 | 2–0 | 2–0 | 3–1 | — | 1–1 | 1–0 | 0–2 | 0–4 | 1–2 | 1–1 | 3–0 | 1–1 | 2–0 | 1–4 | 3–0 | 0–0 |
| Deportivo B | 4–4 | 1–0 | 2–3 | 1–2 | 1–0 | 1–0 | 0–1 | 1–2 | — | 0–0 | 4–1 | 0–1 | 1–2 | 1–2 | 2–1 | 4–0 | 1–0 | 3–2 | 1–1 | 1–0 |
| Extremadura | 0–1 | 1–3 | 0–1 | 0–1 | 1–2 | 0–1 | 1–1 | 0–0 | 3–1 | — | 1–3 | 2–1 | 1–3 | 3–1 | 1–0 | 2–1 | 0–0 | 2–0 | 3–0 | 0–1 |
| Getafe | 0–0 | 1–0 | 2–0 | 4–3 | 1–2 | 2–0 | 2–1 | 0–0 | 1–2 | 4–0 | — | 1–0 | 1–1 | 1–2 | 0–1 | 1–1 | 2–0 | 0–0 | 1–3 | 3–0 |
| Guadalajara | 1–3 | 4–1 | 3–1 | 2–2 | 0–1 | 1–0 | 1–2 | 1–1 | 2–1 | 4–0 | 0–1 | — | 1–0 | 3–0 | 3–0 | 1–0 | 2–1 | 1–1 | 2–0 | 3–0 |
| Leganés | 2–3 | 2–1 | 0–0 | 1–0 | 2–1 | 2–0 | 0–0 | 2–1 | 2–2 | 2–0 | 0–1 | 0–0 | — | 2–0 | 2–1 | 3–1 | 1–0 | 1–0 | 2–1 | 4–0 |
| Lugo | 2–1 | 2–0 | 3–1 | 2–0 | 2–0 | 3–1 | 1–1 | 0–0 | 2–2 | 2–0 | 2–0 | 1–1 | 1–0 | — | 3–1 | 1–0 | 2–1 | 3–1 | 2–0 | 5–0 |
| Montañeros | 3–0 | 1–1 | 0–0 | 0–2 | 4–0 | 2–0 | 2–1 | 1–1 | 3–1 | 2–0 | 2–1 | 1–3 | 0–0 | 2–2 | — | 0–0 | 0–1 | 2–1 | 0–1 | 4–1 |
| Pontevedra | 3–0 | 1–1 | 0–0 | 1–2 | 0–1 | 2–0 | 1–1 | 2–1 | 2–0 | 1–1 | 1–0 | 1–5 | 5–1 | 2–3 | 3–1 | — | 0–1 | 0–2 | 1–0 | 1–2 |
| Rayo B | 2–1 | 1–0 | 2–1 | 0–0 | 3–1 | 2–0 | 3–1 | 1–0 | 3–0 | 0–0 | 2–2 | 0–1 | 3–1 | 1–1 | 2–0 | 1–0 | — | 0–0 | 1–1 | 1–1 |
| RM Castilla | 1–1 | 4–3 | 3–1 | 2–0 | 1–2 | 3–0 | 1–0 | 3–2 | 7–1 | 3–1 | 0–1 | 0–2 | 2–1 | 2–2 | 6–0 | 1–0 | 3–1 | — | 5–0 | 3–1 |
| Universidad LPGC | 1–0 | 0–2 | 2–0 | 1–0 | 2–0 | 2–0 | 1–0 | 2–1 | 1–0 | 1–0 | 0–1 | 1–1 | 0–0 | 3–1 | 0–4 | 4–2 | 1–0 | 3–0 | — | 2–1 |
| Vecindario | 2–1 | 1–0 | 2–2 | 1–0 | 2–0 | 3–1 | 1–1 | 1–0 | 1–1 | 2–1 | 1–1 | 0–0 | 1–0 | 0–1 | 2–4 | 0–0 | 1–1 | 0–0 | 0–0 | — |

Source: BDFutbol
Legend: Blue = home team win; Yellow = draw; Red = away team win.

=== Top goalscorers ===
Last updated 15 May 2011

| Goalscorers | Goals | Team |
|---|---|---|
| (Spain) Mikel Arruabarrena | 21 | Leganés |
| (Spain) Juanjo Serrano | 20 | Guadalajara |
| (Spain) Gorka Azkorra | 17 | Lugo |
| (Spain) Álvaro Morata | 14 | Real Madrid Castilla |
| (Spain) Joselu | 14 | Real Madrid Castilla |

=== Top goalkeepers ===
Last updated 15 May 2011

| Goalkeeper | Goals | Matches | Average | Team |
|---|---|---|---|---|
| (Spain) Rubén Falcón | 31 | 37 | 0.84 | Leganés |
| (Spain) René Román | 32 | 37 | 0.86 | Cacereño |
| (Spain) Juan Carlos Martín | 33 | 34 | 0.97 | Rayo B |
| (Spain) Miguel Escalona | 36 | 36 | 1 | Lugo |
| (Spain) Juancho López | 35 | 35 | 1 | Alcalá |

== Group 2 ==
- Teams from Asturias, Aragon, Basque Country, Cantabria, Castile and León, La Rioja and Navarre.

=== Summary before 2010–11 season ===
- Scores and Classification - Group 2
- Playoffs de Ascenso:
  - AD Alcorcón - Promoted to Segunda División
  - Real Oviedo - Eliminated in First Round
  - CD Guadalajara - Eliminated in First Round
  - Universidad LPGC - Eliminated in Second Round

- Promoted to This Group From Tercera División:
  - Caudal - Founded in: 1918//, Based in: Mieres, Asturias//, Promoted From: Group 2
  - La Muela - Founded in: 2004//, Based in: La Muela, Aragon//, Promoted From: Group 17
  - Peña Sport - Founded in: 1925//, Based in: Tafalla, Navarre//, Promoted From: Group 15
  - Real Sociedad B - Founded in: 1951//, Based in: San Sebastián, Basque Country//, Promoted From: Group 4

- Relegated to This Group From Segunda División:
  - Real Unión - Founded in: 1915//, Based in: Irún, Basque Country//Relegated From: Segunda División

- Relegated to Tercera División:
  - Toledo - Founded in: 1928//, Based in: Toledo, Castile-La Mancha//, Relegated to: Group 18
  - Racing Santander B - Founded in: 1926//, Based in: Santander, Cantabria//, Relegated to: Group 3
  - Villanovense - Founded in: 1992//, Based in: Villanueva de la Serena, Extremadura//, Relegated to: Group 14
  - Tenerife B - Founded in: 1967//, Based in: Santa Cruz de Tenerife, Canary Islands//, Relegated to: Group 12
  - Lanzarote - Founded in: 1970//, Based in: Lanzarote, Canary Islands//, Relegated to: Group 12

=== Stadia and locations ===
Location of teams in Segunda División B Gr. 2 2010–11

| Team | Founded | Home city | Stadium | Capacity |
|---|---|---|---|---|
| Alavés | 1921 | Vitoria-Gasteiz, Basque Country | Mendizorrotza | 19,500 |
| Barakaldo | 1917 | Barakaldo, Basque Country | Lasesarre | 8,000 |
| Bilbao Athletic | 1964 | Bilbao, Basque Country | Lezama | 2,000 |
| Caudal | 1918 | Mieres, Asturias | Hermanos Antuña | 4,500 |
| Cultural Leonesa | 1923 | León, Castile and León | Reino de León | 13,500 |
| Eibar | 1940 | Eibar, Basque Country | Ipurua | 5,200 |
| Gimnástica Torrelavega | 1907 | Torrelavega, Cantabria | Santa Ana (Tanos) | 1,000 |
| Guijuelo | 1974 | Guijuelo, Castile and León | Municipal de Guijuelo | 1,500 |
| La Muela | 2004 | La Muela, Aragon | Clemente Padilla | 1,500 |
| Lemona | 1923 | Lemoa, Basque Country | Arlonagusia | 5,000 |
| Logroñés | 2009 | Logroño, La Rioja | Las Gaunas | 16,000 |
| Mirandés | 1927 | Miranda de Ebro, Castile and León | Anduva | 6,000 |
| Osasuna B | 1964 | Pamplona, Navarre | Tajonar | 2,500 |
| Oviedo | 1926 | Oviedo, Asturias | Carlos Tartiere | 30,500 |
| Palencia | 1975 | Palencia, Castile and León | La Balastera | 8,100 |
| Peña Sport | 1925 | Tafalla, Navarre | San Francisco | 3,000 |
| Real Sociedad B | 1951 | San Sebastián, Basque Country | Zubieta | 2,500 |
| Real Unión | 1915 | Irún, Basque Country | Stadium Gal | 5,000 |
| Sporting B | 1967 | Gijón, Asturias | Mareo | 3,000 |
| Zamora | 1969 | Zamora, Castile and León | Ruta de la Plata | 8,000 |

=== League table ===
| Pos | Team | Pld | W | D | L | GF | GA | GD | Pts | Qualification or relegation |
|---|---|---|---|---|---|---|---|---|---|---|
| 1 | Eibar (C) | 38 | 21 | 10 | 7 | 58 | 32 | +26 | 73 | Qualification to group champions' playoffs |
| 2 | Mirandés | 38 | 20 | 11 | 7 | 51 | 24 | +27 | 71 | Qualification to promotion playoffs |
| 3 | Alavés | 38 | 18 | 12 | 8 | 63 | 43 | +20 | 66 | Qualification to promotion playoffs |
| 4 | Real Unión | 38 | 19 | 8 | 11 | 51 | 35 | +16 | 65 | Qualification to promotion playoffs |
| 5 | Palencia | 38 | 17 | 12 | 9 | 44 | 28 | +16 | 63 | Qualification to Copa del Rey |
| 6 | Logroñés | 38 | 18 | 9 | 11 | 44 | 32 | +12 | 63 | Qualification to Copa del Rey |
| 7 | Osasuna B | 38 | 16 | 10 | 12 | 49 | 39 | +10 | 58 | |
| 8 | Oviedo | 38 | 15 | 13 | 10 | 45 | 34 | +11 | 58 | Qualification to Copa del Rey |
| 9 | Gimnástica Torrelavega | 38 | 14 | 12 | 12 | 34 | 40 | −6 | 54 | |
| 10 | Lemona | 38 | 13 | 14 | 11 | 42 | 38 | +4 | 53 | |
| 11 | Real Sociedad B | 38 | 12 | 15 | 11 | 34 | 37 | −3 | 51 | |
| 12 | Bilbao Athletic | 38 | 9 | 19 | 10 | 29 | 37 | −8 | 46 | |
| 13 | Zamora | 38 | 11 | 10 | 17 | 46 | 56 | −10 | 43 | |
| 14 | Cultural Leonesa (Note: Cultural Leonesa was relegated to Tercera División for not paying its players.) (R) | 38 | 9 | 16 | 13 | 42 | 48 | −6 | 43 | |
| 15 | Guijuelo | 38 | 7 | 18 | 13 | 39 | 44 | −5 | 39 | |
| 16 | Caudal (R) | 38 | 9 | 11 | 18 | 29 | 38 | −9 | 38 | Qualification to relegation playoffs |
| 17 | La Muela (Note: La Muela was relegated to Regional Preferente for not paying its players.) (R) | 38 | 8 | 14 | 16 | 36 | 56 | −20 | 38 | Relegation to Tercera División |
| 18 | Peña Sport (R) | 38 | 9 | 9 | 20 | 30 | 56 | −26 | 36 | Relegation to Tercera División |
| 19 | Sporting B (Note: Sporting B avoided relegation to Tercera División after buying the vacant place in Segunda División B left by the administrative relegation of Universidad LPGC.) | 38 | 7 | 13 | 18 | 26 | 54 | −28 | 34 | |
| 20 | Barakaldo (R) | 38 | 4 | 12 | 22 | 27 | 48 | −21 | 24 | Relegation to Tercera División |

Rules for classification: 1st points; 2nd head-to-head; 3rd goal difference; 4th goals scored
(C) Champions; (R) Relegated

=== Results ===
| Home \ Away | ALA | BAR | BAT | CAU | CDL | EIB | TOR | GUJ | MUE | LEM | LOG | MIR | OSA | ROV | PAL | PEÑ | RSO | RUN | SPO | ZAM |
|---|---|---|---|---|---|---|---|---|---|---|---|---|---|---|---|---|---|---|---|---|
| Alavés | — | 1–1 | 1–0 | 1–0 | 0–0 | 0–4 | 0–0 | 2–0 | 2–2 | 3–3 | 3–1 | 1–3 | 3–1 | 2–1 | 1–2 | 7–1 | 1–1 | 4–1 | 2–0 | 1–1 |
| Barakaldo | 1–1 | — | 1–1 | 2–0 | 0–0 | 1–2 | 2–2 | 1–2 | 1–0 | 1–0 | 1–2 | 1–2 | 1–1 | 0–1 | 1–1 | 1–2 | 3–3 | 0–2 | 2–0 | 1–2 |
| Bilbao Athletic | 0–0 | 1–0 | — | 1–1 | 2–1 | 0–2 | 1–0 | 0–0 | 0–1 | 0–1 | 1–0 | 1–0 | 0–4 | 0–0 | 0–0 | 2–0 | 0–1 | 1–0 | 1–1 | 2–2 |
| Caudal | 1–2 | 1–0 | 3–0 | — | 0–0 | 2–3 | 2–3 | 0–0 | 3–1 | 1–0 | 0–0 | 0–1 | 1–0 | 0–2 | 0–3 | 3–0 | 0–0 | 1–2 | 0–0 | 0–0 |
| Cultural Leonesa | 2–2 | 2–0 | 2–2 | 1–1 | — | 0–1 | 3–0 | 1–3 | 2–2 | 1–0 | 0–1 | 0–2 | 0–2 | 4–1 | 1–3 | 1–0 | 1–1 | 0–3 | 4–1 | 1–1 |
| Eibar | 2–1 | 2–1 | 0–1 | 1–0 | 2–3 | — | 4–1 | 2–1 | 6–1 | 0–0 | 0–1 | 0–1 | 1–0 | 1–1 | 2–1 | 2–0 | 0–0 | 1–1 | 3–2 | 2–1 |
| Gimnástica Torrelavega | 1–1 | 1–0 | 1–0 | 1–0 | 0–0 | 1–1 | — | 1–0 | 1–1 | 3–1 | 1–1 | 0–0 | 0–1 | 2–0 | 2–1 | 0–0 | 0–0 | 0–1 | 2–1 | 1–3 |
| Guijuelo | 0–2 | 0–0 | 1–2 | 0–0 | 0–0 | 2–2 | 2–0 | — | 2–2 | 4–1 | 2–0 | 2–2 | 1–2 | 0–0 | 0–0 | 0–0 | 1–1 | 1–2 | 1–0 | 3–1 |
| La Muela | 1–2 | 0–0 | 0–0 | 1–0 | 0–1 | 0–0 | 0–1 | 3–2 | — | 1–3 | 0–0 | 1–0 | 2–2 | 1–2 | 0–3 | 1–0 | 1–2 | 2–0 | 4–0 | 2–0 |
| Lemona | 1–1 | 1–0 | 0–0 | 2–0 | 3–3 | 0–0 | 1–2 | 2–2 | 1–0 | — | 0–0 | 0–1 | 2–0 | 0–1 | 1–0 | 1–0 | 0–0 | 1–4 | 0–0 | 2–1 |
| Logroñés | 1–2 | 2–0 | 1–0 | 0–1 | 2–0 | 2–1 | 2–1 | 1–1 | 0–0 | 2–1 | — | 1–1 | 1–3 | 2–0 | 2–1 | 3–0 | 4–0 | 2–1 | 1–1 | 1–0 |
| Mirandés | 1–0 | 2–0 | 0–0 | 2–0 | 1–0 | 0–2 | 2–2 | 2–0 | 6–2 | 1–3 | 0–2 | — | 0–0 | 2–0 | 0–0 | 0–0 | 0–0 | 0–0 | 0–0 | 4–0 |
| Osasuna B | 1–2 | 1–0 | 0–0 | 2–2 | 1–1 | 1–2 | 4–1 | 0–0 | 1–1 | 3–2 | 1–0 | 2–1 | — | 2–0 | 0–1 | 0–2 | 0–2 | 1–3 | 2–1 | 4–1 |
| Oviedo | 2–0 | 2–1 | 3–0 | 1–1 | 2–2 | 2–1 | 0–0 | 2–2 | 4–1 | 1–2 | 1–1 | 0–1 | 1–0 | — | 2–2 | 4–1 | 0–0 | 2–0 | 0–1 | 3–0 |
| Palencia | 1–2 | 2–0 | 2–2 | 1–0 | 1–0 | 0–0 | 1–1 | 0–0 | 0–0 | 0–2 | 1–0 | 1–1 | 1–3 | 1–0 | — | 1–0 | 1–0 | 2–0 | 2–0 | 3–1 |
| Peña Sport | 0–3 | 1–1 | 0–0 | 2–1 | 1–1 | 1–2 | 0–1 | 3–1 | 2–0 | 1–1 | 2–1 | 1–2 | 0–1 | 1–1 | 0–2 | — | 2–2 | 1–2 | 1–0 | 1–0 |
| Real Sociedad B | 2–1 | 2–1 | 2–2 | 1–0 | 2–2 | 0–1 | 1–0 | 2–1 | 1–1 | 0–3 | 0–1 | 1–2 | 0–1 | 0–1 | 1–0 | 0–2 | — | 1–0 | 1–0 | 2–0 |
| Real Unión | 1–3 | 1–0 | 2–2 | 1–0 | 2–1 | 1–1 | 2–0 | 1–0 | 3–0 | 0–0 | 3–0 | 0–1 | 0–0 | 0–2 | 1–0 | 3–2 | 1–1 | — | 5–1 | 0–0 |
| Sporting B | 2–1 | 0–0 | 2–2 | 0–2 | 0–1 | 2–0 | 1–0 | 3–1 | 0–0 | 0–0 | 0–2 | 1–6 | 1–1 | 0–0 | 1–1 | 1–0 | 1–0 | 0–2 | — | 1–1 |
| Zamora | 1–2 | 2–1 | 2–2 | 1–2 | 3–0 | 1–2 | 1–2 | 1–1 | 3–1 | 1–1 | 2–1 | 0–2 | 2–1 | 0–0 | 1–2 | 4–0 | 2–1 | 1–0 | 3–1 | — |

Source: BDFutbol
Legend: Blue = home team win; Yellow = draw; Red = away team win.

=== Top goalscorers ===
Last updated 15 May 2011

| Goalscorers | Goals | Team |
|---|---|---|
| (Spain) Diego Cervero | 17 | Logroñés |
| (Spain) Jon Altuna | 16 | Eibar |
| (Spain) Iker Torre | 15 | Zamora |
| (Spain) Alejandro Suárez | 13 | Palencia |
| (Spain) Gorka Brit | 13 | Real Unión |

=== Top goalkeepers ===
Last updated 15 May 2011

| Goalkeeper | Goals | Matches | Average | Team |
|---|---|---|---|---|
| (Spain) Wilfred Muñoz | 24 | 36 | 0.67 | Mirandés |
| (Spain) Juan Carlos Castilla | 28 | 37 | 0.76 | Palencia |
| (Spain) Xabi Iruretagoiena | 25 | 32 | 0.78 | Eibar |
| (Spain) Oinatz Aulestia | 30 | 37 | 0.81 | Oviedo |
| (Spain) Aitor Alcalde | 27 | 33 | 0.82 | Lemona |

== Group 3 ==
- Teams from Aragon, Balearic Islands, Catalonia and Valencian Community.

=== Summary before 2010–11 season ===
- Scores and Classification - Group 3
- Playoffs de Ascenso:
  - UE Sant Andreu - Eliminated in Third Round
  - FC Barcelona Atlètic - Promoted to Segunda División
  - Ontinyent CF - Eliminated in Third Round
  - CD Alcoyano - Eliminated in First Round

- Promoted to This Group From Tercera División:
  - Alzira - Founded in: 1946//, Based in: Alzira, Valencian Community//, Promoted From: Group 6
  - Atlético Baleares - Founded in: 1920//, Based in: Palma de Mallorca, Balearic Islands//, Promoted From: Group 11
  - Gandía - Founded in: 1947//, Based in: Gandía, Valencian Community//, Promoted From: Group 6
  - L'Hospitalet - Founded in: 1957//, Based in: L'Hospitalet de Llobregat, Catalonia//, Promoted From: Group 5
  - Santboià - Founded in: 1908//, Based in: Sant Boi de Llobregat, Catalonia//, Promoted From: Group 5
  - Teruel - Founded in: 1946//, Based in: Teruel, Aragon//, Promoted From: Group 17

- Relegated to This Group From Segunda División:
  - Castellón - Founded in: 1922//, Based in: Castellón de la Plana, Valencian Community//, Relegated From: Segunda División

- Relegated to Tercera División:
  - Espanyol B - Founded in: 1981//, Based in: Barcelona, Catalonia//, Relegated to: Group 5
  - Villajoyosa - Founded in: 1944//, Based in: Villajoyosa, Valencian Community//, Relegated to: Group 6
  - Valencia Mestalla - Founded in: 1944//, Based in: Valencia, Valencian Community//, Relegated to: Group 6
  - Gavà - Founded in: 1922//, Based in: Gavà, Catalonia//, Relegated to: Group 5
  - Terrassa - Founded in: 1906//, Based in: Terrassa, Catalonia//, Relegated to: Group 5

=== Stadia and locations ===
Location of teams in Segunda División B Gr. 3 2010–11

| Team | Founded | Home city | Stadium | Capacity |
|---|---|---|---|---|
| Alcoyano | 1929 | Alcoy, Valencian Community | El Collao | 5,000 |
| Alicante | 1918 | Alicante, Valencian Community | Villafranqueza | 4,000 |
| Alzira | 1946 | Alzira, Valencian Community | Luis Suñer Picó | 4,000 |
| Atlético Baleares | 1920 | Palma de Mallorca, Balearic Islands | Balear | 16,000 |
| Badalona | 1903 | Badalona, Catalonia | Camp del Centenari | 6,000 |
| Benidorm | 1964 | Benidorm, Valencian Community | Guillermo Amor | 6,000 |
| Castellón | 1922 | Castellón de la Plana, Valencian Community | Castalia | 16,000 |
| Dénia | 1927 | Dénia, Valencian Community | Camp Nou | 3,000 |
| Gandía | 1947 | Gandía, Valencian Community | Guillermo Olagüe | 6,000 |
| Gramenet | 1945 | Santa Coloma de Gramenet, Catalonia | Nou Camp Municipal | 4,000 |
| L'Hospitalet | 1957 | L'Hospitalet de Llobregat, Catalonia | Feixa Llarga | 6,200 |
| Lleida | 1939 | Lleida, Catalonia | Camp d'Esports | 13,500 |
| Ontinyent | 1947 | Ontinyent, Valencian Community | El Clariano | 5,000 |
| Orihuela | 1993 | Orihuela, Valencian Community | Los Arcos | 5,000 |
| Mallorca B | 1983 | Palma de Mallorca, Balearic Islands | Ciudad Deportiva | 2,000 |
| Sabadell | 1903 | Sabadell, Catalonia | Nova Creu Alta | 20,000 |
| Sant Andreu | 1925 | Barcelona, Catalonia | Narcís Sala | 6,900 |
| Santboià | 1908 | Sant Boi de Llobregat, Catalonia | Joan Baptisma Milá | 2,500 |
| Sporting Mahonés | 1974 | Mahón, Balearic Islands | Municipal de Bintaufa | 3,000 |
| Teruel | 1946 | Teruel, Aragon | Campo de Pinilla | 4,000 |

=== League table ===
| Pos | Team | Pld | W | D | L | GF | GA | GD | Pts | Qualification or relegation |
|---|---|---|---|---|---|---|---|---|---|---|
| 1 | Sabadell (C, P) | 38 | 19 | 12 | 7 | 42 | 24 | +18 | 69 | Qualification to group champions' playoffs |
| 2 | Badalona | 38 | 17 | 14 | 7 | 40 | 26 | +14 | 65 | Qualification to promotion playoffs |
| 3 | Alcoyano (P) | 38 | 17 | 12 | 9 | 46 | 32 | +14 | 63 | Qualification to promotion playoffs |
| 4 | Orihuela | 38 | 17 | 12 | 9 | 41 | 30 | +11 | 63 | Qualification to promotion playoffs |
| 5 | Lleida (Note: Lleida was re-named Lleida Esportiu after the end of the season.) | 38 | 17 | 9 | 12 | 46 | 30 | +16 | 60 | Qualification to Copa del Rey |
| 6 | L'Hospitalet | 38 | 16 | 12 | 10 | 58 | 34 | +24 | 60 | Qualification to Copa del Rey |
| 7 | Sant Andreu | 38 | 13 | 16 | 9 | 37 | 29 | +8 | 55 | Qualification to Copa del Rey |
| 8 | Dénia | 38 | 14 | 13 | 11 | 34 | 38 | −4 | 55 | |
| 9 | Alicante (Note: Alicante was relegated to Tercera División for not paying its players.) (R) | 38 | 12 | 17 | 9 | 40 | 32 | +8 | 53 | |
| 10 | Castellón (Note: Castellón was relegated to Tercera División for not paying its players.) (R) | 38 | 15 | 8 | 15 | 39 | 42 | −3 | 53 | |
| 11 | Ontinyent | 38 | 14 | 9 | 15 | 35 | 32 | +3 | 51 | |
| 12 | Teruel | 38 | 12 | 14 | 12 | 37 | 32 | +5 | 50 | |
| 13 | Atlético Baleares | 38 | 11 | 16 | 11 | 43 | 38 | +5 | 49 | |
| 14 | Gandía | 38 | 12 | 13 | 13 | 36 | 45 | −9 | 49 | |
| 15 | Sporting Mahonés | 38 | 12 | 9 | 17 | 35 | 54 | −19 | 45 | |
| 16 | Benidorm (Note: Benidorm was relegated to Regional Preferente for not paying its players.) (R) | 38 | 10 | 12 | 16 | 32 | 45 | −13 | 42 | Qualification to relegation playoffs |
| 17 | Alzira (R) | 38 | 8 | 16 | 14 | 34 | 40 | −6 | 40 | Relegation to Tercera División |
| 18 | Gramenet (R) | 38 | 10 | 6 | 22 | 37 | 67 | −30 | 36 | Relegation to Tercera División |
| 19 | Mallorca B (Note: Mallorca B avoided relegation to Tercera División after buying the vacant place in Segunda División B left by the administrative relegation of Castellón.) | 38 | 7 | 13 | 18 | 36 | 48 | −12 | 34 | |
| 20 | Santboià (R) | 38 | 7 | 7 | 24 | 35 | 65 | −30 | 28 | Relegation to Tercera División |

Rules for classification: 1st points; 2nd head-to-head; 3rd goal difference; 4th goals scored
(C) Champions; (P) Promoted; (R) Relegated

=== Results ===
| Home \ Away | ALC | ALI | ALZ | BAL | BAD | BEN | CAS | DEN | GAN | GRA | HOS | LLE | MLL | ONT | ORI | SAB | SAN | SBO | MAH | TER |
|---|---|---|---|---|---|---|---|---|---|---|---|---|---|---|---|---|---|---|---|---|
| Alcoyano | — | 1–1 | 1–1 | 0–0 | 0–0 | 2–0 | 1–2 | 2–2 | 0–1 | 3–1 | 2–3 | 2–0 | 1–0 | 0–0 | 1–1 | 0–1 | 1–0 | 2–1 | 1–1 | 2–1 |
| Alicante | 0–1 | — | 1–0 | 0–0 | 2–0 | 1–0 | 0–1 | 1–2 | 3–0 | 3–0 | 0–0 | 1–2 | 1–1 | 0–0 | 0–0 | 0–1 | 0–1 | 3–1 | 1–2 | 0–0 |
| Alzira | 1–1 | 0–1 | — | 2–2 | 2–1 | 0–2 | 1–1 | 1–2 | 1–2 | 1–2 | 0–0 | 0–2 | 1–1 | 0–0 | 4–2 | 0–1 | 0–0 | 3–0 | 1–0 | 1–1 |
| Atlético Baleares | 1–1 | 1–1 | 2–1 | — | 2–1 | 2–0 | 0–1 | 1–3 | 4–1 | 5–1 | 1–0 | 1–0 | 4–0 | 1–0 | 0–0 | 0–0 | 0–1 | 3–0 | 1–1 | 1–1 |
| Badalona | 1–0 | 2–2 | 1–0 | 2–1 | — | 0–0 | 1–0 | 0–0 | 2–1 | 4–1 | 2–1 | 2–1 | 2–1 | 1–0 | 0–0 | 1–1 | 0–0 | 2–0 | 4–0 | 1–0 |
| Benidorm | 0–1 | 3–3 | 0–3 | 1–0 | 3–0 | — | 3–1 | 1–1 | 1–1 | 1–0 | 0–2 | 1–2 | 0–5 | 3–1 | 1–0 | 1–1 | 0–0 | 1–1 | 1–1 | 0–1 |
| Castellón | 2–3 | 0–1 | 0–0 | 0–0 | 2–1 | 0–1 | — | 4–0 | 2–0 | 1–1 | 2–1 | 1–1 | 1–0 | 2–1 | 0–2 | 0–2 | 0–1 | 2–1 | 2–0 | 0–3 |
| Dénia | 1–1 | 0–1 | 1–1 | 0–0 | 0–0 | 1–1 | 1–3 | — | 2–1 | 1–1 | 1–0 | 0–2 | 1–0 | 0–1 | 0–0 | 1–0 | 0–1 | 2–0 | 3–0 | 1–1 |
| Gandía | 0–1 | 1–1 | 1–1 | 1–0 | 0–0 | 0–1 | 2–0 | 0–0 | — | 1–4 | 1–1 | 2–5 | 1–1 | 1–0 | 3–1 | 1–0 | 1–1 | 1–0 | 0–1 | 1–0 |
| Gramenet | 1–3 | 1–2 | 2–1 | 2–2 | 0–1 | 1–0 | 2–1 | 1–3 | 0–1 | — | 0–0 | 0–5 | 4–2 | 0–2 | 3–1 | 1–2 | 0–1 | 2–1 | 0–2 | 1–0 |
| L'Hospitalet | 2–0 | 0–0 | 4–0 | 5–0 | 1–1 | 0–1 | 2–0 | 3–0 | 1–1 | 4–0 | — | 0–0 | 3–0 | 3–2 | 3–1 | 1–1 | 2–2 | 3–2 | 2–1 | 1–1 |
| Lleida | 1–1 | 1–0 | 0–2 | 1–1 | 0–2 | 0–0 | 3–0 | 0–1 | 2–1 | 3–0 | 1–0 | — | 0–2 | 0–1 | 1–0 | 0–1 | 1–1 | 1–0 | 4–0 | 3–0 |
| Mallorca B | 1–2 | 2–2 | 0–0 | 1–1 | 0–1 | 1–0 | 0–1 | 0–1 | 0–0 | 2–1 | 0–2 | 0–1 | — | 0–1 | 2–0 | 0–1 | 1–0 | 3–1 | 1–1 | 1–1 |
| Ontinyent | 1–0 | 1–2 | 3–0 | 0–2 | 0–0 | 1–0 | 1–1 | 1–0 | 0–1 | 3–0 | 2–1 | 2–0 | 3–3 | — | 0–1 | 1–2 | 0–0 | 1–0 | 1–0 | 0–0 |
| Orihuela | 0–3 | 2–0 | 0–0 | 0–0 | 1–1 | 3–0 | 1–1 | 1–0 | 2–0 | 1–0 | 1–0 | 1–0 | 2–1 | 0–0 | — | 1–0 | 2–1 | 3–0 | 1–1 | 1–0 |
| Sabadell | 0–1 | 1–1 | 1–0 | 3–1 | 0–0 | 1–0 | 1–1 | 4–0 | 2–2 | 1–0 | 1–2 | 0–0 | 2–0 | 1–0 | 1–1 | — | 2–0 | 1–0 | 2–1 | 0–2 |
| Sant Andreu | 2–0 | 1–1 | 1–1 | 1–1 | 1–0 | 1–1 | 1–2 | 0–1 | 1–1 | 1–1 | 2–2 | 0–0 | 1–1 | 1–0 | 0–3 | 0–1 | — | 5–0 | 2–0 | 2–1 |
| Santboià | 1–3 | 0–0 | 1–1 | 3–1 | 1–0 | 3–1 | 0–1 | 0–2 | 3–2 | 0–2 | 1–2 | 1–1 | 2–2 | 2–1 | 0–2 | 2–2 | 1–2 | — | 3–1 | 0–1 |
| Sporting Mahonés | 0–2 | 1–2 | 0–2 | 2–1 | 1–1 | 2–1 | 2–1 | 0–0 | 1–1 | 2–1 | 3–1 | 3–1 | 1–0 | 1–3 | 1–0 | 1–0 | 0–2 | 0–3 | — | 0–1 |
| Teruel | 1–0 | 2–2 | 0–1 | 1–0 | 1–2 | 2–2 | 1–0 | 4–0 | 0–1 | 0–0 | 1–0 | 0–1 | 1–1 | 3–1 | 2–3 | 1–1 | 1–0 | 0–0 | 1–1 | — |

Source: BDFutbol
Legend: Blue = home team win; Yellow = draw; Red = away team win.

=== Top goalscorers ===
Last updated 15 May 2011

| Goalscorers | Goals | Team |
|---|---|---|
| (Spain) Rubén Rayos | 18 | Lleida |
| (Spain) Luismi Loro | 17 | Castellón |
| (Spain) David Miguélez | 14 | Sant Andreu |
| (Spain) Sergio Cirio | 13 | L'Hospitalet |
| (Spain) Salva Chamorro | 12 | Teruel |

=== Top goalkeepers ===
Last updated 15 May 2011

| Goalkeeper | Goals | Matches | Average | Team |
|---|---|---|---|---|
| (Spain) David de Navas | 24 | 37 | 0.65 | Sabadell |
| (Spain) David Valle | 26 | 37 | 0.7 | Badalona |
| (Spain) Juan Carlos Caballero | 26 | 36 | 0.72 | Teruel |
| (Spain) José Miguel Morales | 22 | 29 | 0.76 | Sant Andreu |
| (Spain) Eduardo Pérez | 30 | 38 | 0.79 | Lleida |

== Group 4 ==
- Teams from Andalusia, Castile-La Mancha, Ceuta, Melilla and Region of Murcia.

=== Summary before 2010–11 season ===
- Scores and Classification - Group 4
- Playoffs de Ascenso:
  - Granada CF - Promoted to Segunda División
  - UD Melilla - Eliminated in First Round
  - Real Jaén - Eliminated in Second Round
  - Polideportivo Ejido - Eliminated in First Round

- Promoted to This Group From Tercera División:
  - Alcalá - Founded in: 1944//, Based in: Alcalá de Guadaira, Andalusia, Promoted From: Group 10
  - Yecla - Founded in: 2004//, Based in: Yecla, Region of Murcia, Promoted From: Group 13
  - Jumilla - Founded in: 1975//, Based in: Jumilla, Region of Murcia//, Promoted From: Group 13
  - Almería B - Founded in: 2001//, Based in: Almería, Andalusia, Promoted From: Group 9

- Relegated to This Group From Segunda División:
  - Cádiz - Founded in: 1910//, Based in: Cádiz, Andalusia//, Relegated From: Segunda División
  - Real Murcia - Founded in: 1908//, Based in: Murcia, Region of Murcia//, Relegated From: Segunda División

- Relegated to Tercera División:
  - Moratalla - Founded in: 1979//, Based in: Moratalla, Region of Murcia//, Relegated to: Group 13
  - Jerez Industrial - Founded in: 1950//, Based in: Jerez de la Frontera, Andalusia//, Relegated to: Group 10
  - Marbella - Founded in: 1997//, Based in: Marbella, Andalusia//, Relegated to: Group 9
  - Águilas - Founded in: 1925//, Based in: Águilas, Region of Murcia//, Relegated to: Group 13

=== Stadia and locations ===
Location of teams in Segunda División B Gr. 4 2010–11

| Team | Founded | Home city | Stadium | Capacity |
|---|---|---|---|---|
| Alcalá | 1944 | Alcalá de Guadaira, Andalusia | Francisco Bono; San Sebastián | 3,000; 2,000 |
| Almería B | 2001 | Almería, Andalusia | Juan Rojas; Juegos del Mediterraneo | 13,000; 23,000 |
| Betis B | 1962 | Seville, Andalusia | Ciudad Deportiva | 4,000 |
| Cádiz | 1910 | Cádiz, Andalusia | Ramón de Carranza | 20,000 |
| Caravaca | 1969 | Caravaca de la Cruz, Region of Murcia | Antonio Martínez El Morao | 2,500 |
| Ceuta | 1996 | Ceuta | Alfonso Murube | 6,000 |
| Écija | 1968 | Écija, Andalusia | San Pablo | 6,000 |
| Jumilla | 1975 | Jumilla, Region of Murcia | Municipal de La Hoya | 3,000 |
| Lorca Atlético | 2010 | Lorca, Region of Murcia | Francisco Artés Carrasco | 8,000 |
| Lucena | 1986 | Lucena, Andalusia | Municipal de Lucena | 6,000 |
| Melilla | 1976 | Melilla | Álvarez Claro | 12,000 |
| Poli Ejido | 1969 | El Ejido, Andalusia | Municipal Santo Domingo | 7,800 |
| Puertollano | 1948 | Puertollano, Castile-La Mancha | Francisco Sánchez Menor; Ciudad de Puertollano | 7,500; 8,000 |
| Real Jaén | 1922 | Jaén, Andalusia | Nuevo La Victoria | 12,000 |
| Real Murcia | 1908 | Murcia, Region of Murcia | Nueva Condomina | 33,000 |
| Roquetas | 1933 | Roquetas de Mar, Andalusia | Antonio Peroles | 9,000 |
| San Roque | 1956 | Lepe, Andalusia | Municipal de Lepe | 3,500 |
| Sevilla Atlético | 1958 | Seville, Andalusia | Ciudad Deportiva | 7,000 |
| Unión Estepona | 1995 | Estepona, Andalusia | Francisco Muñoz Pérez | 4,500 |
| Yeclano | 2004 | Yecla, Region of Murcia | La Constitución | 4,000 |

=== League table ===
| Pos | Team | Pld | W | D | L | GF | GA | GD | Pts | Qualification or relegation |
|---|---|---|---|---|---|---|---|---|---|---|
| 1 | Real Murcia (C, P) | 38 | 24 | 10 | 4 | 68 | 21 | +47 | 82 | Qualification to group champions' playoffs |
| 2 | Sevilla Atlético | 38 | 21 | 11 | 6 | 82 | 40 | +42 | 74 | Qualification to promotion playoffs |
| 3 | Melilla | 38 | 21 | 9 | 8 | 53 | 28 | +25 | 72 | Qualification to promotion playoffs |
| 4 | Cádiz | 38 | 21 | 6 | 11 | 61 | 37 | +24 | 69 | Qualification to promotion playoffs |
| 5 | San Roque | 38 | 18 | 9 | 11 | 42 | 35 | +7 | 63 | Qualification to Copa del Rey |
| 6 | Ceuta | 38 | 16 | 12 | 10 | 52 | 42 | +10 | 60 | Qualification to Copa del Rey |
| 7 | Roquetas | 38 | 16 | 11 | 11 | 48 | 36 | +12 | 59 | Qualification to Copa del Rey |
| 8 | Real Jaén | 38 | 14 | 14 | 10 | 39 | 29 | +10 | 56 | Qualification to Copa del Rey |
| 9 | Écija | 38 | 15 | 9 | 14 | 41 | 45 | −4 | 54 | |
| 10 | Lucena | 38 | 14 | 10 | 14 | 42 | 40 | +2 | 52 | |
| 11 | Caravaca (Note: Caravaca fused with La Unión after the end of the season.) | 38 | 13 | 10 | 15 | 41 | 40 | +1 | 49 | |
| 12 | Puertollano | 38 | 12 | 12 | 14 | 40 | 50 | −10 | 48 | |
| 13 | Almería B | 38 | 12 | 10 | 16 | 38 | 46 | −8 | 46 | |
| 14 | Poli Ejido | 38 | 11 | 11 | 16 | 41 | 51 | −10 | 44 | |
| 15 | Lorca Atlético | 38 | 12 | 7 | 19 | 37 | 55 | −18 | 43 | |
| 16 | Betis B | 38 | 10 | 12 | 16 | 36 | 45 | −9 | 42 | Qualification to relegation playoffs |
| 17 | Alcalá (R) | 38 | 11 | 7 | 20 | 30 | 51 | −21 | 40 | Relegation to Tercera División |
| 18 | Unión Estepona (R) | 38 | 8 | 16 | 14 | 37 | 45 | −8 | 40 | Relegation to Tercera División |
| 19 | Yeclano (R) | 38 | 5 | 12 | 21 | 28 | 63 | −35 | 27 | Relegation to Tercera División |
| 20 | Jumilla (Note: Jumilla was dissolved after the end of the season.) (D) | 38 | 5 | 4 | 29 | 16 | 72 | −56 | 16 (Note: Jumilla was docked 3 points for not having a minimum of four professional players in their squad after one of their players' transfer (Jesús Limones) to Ceuta.) | Relegation to Tercera División |

Rules for classification: 1st points; 2nd head-to-head; 3rd goal difference; 4th goals scored
(C) Champions; (D) Dissolved; (P) Promoted; (R) Relegated

=== Results ===
| Home \ Away | ALC | ALM | RBB | CÁD | CAR | CEU | ECJ | JUM | LOA | LUC | MEL | PLD | PRT | RJA | RMU | ROQ | SRQ | SAT | EST | YEC |
|---|---|---|---|---|---|---|---|---|---|---|---|---|---|---|---|---|---|---|---|---|
| Alcalá | — | 2–0 | 0–0 | 0–3 | 0–1 | 0–1 | 0–1 | 2–0 | 0–0 | 1–0 | 1–1 | 1–1 | 3–3 | 1–0 | 0–1 | 1–0 | 1–0 | 0–2 | 2–0 | 2–0 |
| Almería B | 1–0 | — | 1–1 | 1–3 | 0–1 | 1–0 | 2–3 | 3–1 | 2–0 | 3–0 | 1–1 | 0–0 | 1–1 | 1–0 | 1–0 | 1–2 | 1–1 | 0–5 | 1–1 | 0–0 |
| Betis B | 1–2 | 0–1 | — | 0–2 | 2–1 | 2–1 | 2–1 | 1–0 | 3–0 | 2–2 | 0–1 | 0–0 | 1–1 | 2–0 | 1–1 | 2–0 | 0–1 | 0–1 | 1–3 | 1–1 |
| Cádiz | 2–0 | 1–1 | 0–1 | — | 3–0 | 1–0 | 4–1 | 2–0 | 1–2 | 1–1 | 0–1 | 1–0 | 2–0 | 2–1 | 1–1 | 2–1 | 0–2 | 2–1 | 2–1 | 3–2 |
| Caravaca | 2–0 | 2–1 | 3–0 | 0–1 | — | 1–1 | 1–1 | 1–2 | 1–0 | 2–2 | 1–0 | 4–1 | 2–0 | 0–0 | 2–1 | 1–1 | 4–1 | 0–2 | 0–0 | 1–2 |
| Ceuta | 4–0 | 1–1 | 2–0 | 1–1 | 2–0 | — | 2–2 | 5–2 | 2–0 | 0–1 | 1–2 | 2–1 | 1–0 | 3–1 | 2–1 | 1–1 | 1–1 | 1–5 | 0–0 | 3–1 |
| Écija | 0–1 | 0–2 | 2–2 | 4–3 | 2–0 | 0–0 | — | 2–0 | 2–0 | 1–0 | 1–2 | 1–0 | 1–1 | 0–0 | 0–2 | 1–0 | 3–1 | 1–1 | 1–2 | 2–1 |
| Jumilla | 1–0 | 0–2 | 0–3 | 1–3 | 0–2 | 0–1 | 0–1 | — | 0–1 | 0–3 | 0–1 | 1–0 | 0–0 | 1–5 | 0–1 | 0–0 | 0–3 | 2–3 | 0–0 | 2–1 |
| Lorca Atlético | 1–2 | 3–1 | 1–0 | 0–4 | 1–0 | 1–2 | 1–0 | 3–0 | — | 1–0 | 2–0 | 2–3 | 2–0 | 2–2 | 1–0 | 0–1 | 1–1 | 0–3 | 2–2 | 1–2 |
| Lucena | 5–0 | 1–0 | 1–1 | 3–1 | 2–1 | 1–0 | 1–1 | 0–1 | 2–0 | — | 1–2 | 1–0 | 3–1 | 0–1 | 0–0 | 1–0 | 0–0 | 0–2 | 1–0 | 4–0 |
| Melilla | 2–0 | 1–0 | 3–1 | 2–0 | 1–1 | 0–2 | 3–0 | 4–0 | 2–0 | 1–0 | — | 2–0 | 1–0 | 1–1 | 1–1 | 0–1 | 0–1 | 4–4 | 2–0 | 2–0 |
| Poli Ejido | 0–0 | 3–1 | 2–0 | 3–2 | 2–0 | 2–0 | 1–1 | 1–0 | 2–2 | 1–4 | 2–1 | — | 2–2 | 1–2 | 1–2 | 0–3 | 2–1 | 1–2 | 2–1 | 1–1 |
| Puertollano | 3–2 | 2–1 | 2–0 | 0–2 | 1–0 | 1–1 | 0–1 | 1–0 | 2–1 | 3–1 | 1–1 | 1–0 | — | 0–1 | 1–3 | 0–0 | 1–0 | 2–2 | 2–0 | 3–0 |
| Real Jaén | 2–0 | 1–2 | 1–1 | 2–1 | 0–0 | 1–1 | 1–0 | 2–0 | 1–0 | 0–0 | 0–0 | 0–0 | 0–0 | — | 1–1 | 3–0 | 1–0 | 0–0 | 1–1 | 3–1 |
| Real Murcia | 2–0 | 1–0 | 1–0 | 1–1 | 2–1 | 5–0 | 1–0 | 2–1 | 3–1 | 6–0 | 1–0 | 2–0 | 3–0 | 2–0 | — | 0–0 | 1–1 | 1–1 | 2–0 | 4–0 |
| Roquetas | 4–2 | 1–1 | 2–0 | 1–0 | 2–1 | 1–1 | 3–0 | 5–1 | 2–0 | 3–0 | 0–1 | 0–3 | 4–2 | 2–1 | 0–3 | — | 0–1 | 2–2 | 1–1 | 2–0 |
| San Roque | 1–1 | 4–1 | 2–0 | 1–0 | 1–0 | 0–2 | 1–0 | 2–0 | 1–1 | 1–0 | 3–1 | 2–1 | 0–1 | 1–0 | 0–2 | 1–0 | — | 1–0 | 1–2 | 1–0 |
| Sevilla Atlético | 3–1 | 1–0 | 1–1 | 0–1 | 3–3 | 3–3 | 2–0 | 2–0 | 4–1 | 2–2 | 0–4 | 5–1 | 5–0 | 1–0 | 1–3 | 1–1 | 4–0 | — | 1–1 | 5–1 |
| Unión Estepona | 2–1 | 1–0 | 1–1 | 0–2 | 0–1 | 2–0 | 1–2 | 4–0 | 1–1 | 0–0 | 1–2 | 1–1 | 1–1 | 1–2 | 1–4 | 1–1 | 2–2 | 0–1 | — | 1–0 |
| Yeclano | 2–1 | 1–2 | 1–3 | 1–1 | 0–0 | 0–2 | 1–2 | 0–0 | 1–2 | 1–1 | 0–0 | 0–0 | 2–1 | 0–2 | 1–1 | 0–1 | 1–1 | 2–1 | 1–1 | — |

Source: BDFutbol
Legend: Blue = home team win; Yellow = draw; Red = away team win.

=== Top goalscorers ===
Last updated 15 May 2011

| Goalscorers | Goals | Team |
|---|---|---|
| (Spain) Rodri | 19 | Sevilla Atlético |
| (Spain) Chando | 17 | Real Murcia |
| (Spain) Luis Alberto | 15 | Sevilla Atlético |
| (Spain) Pedro | 13 | Real Murcia |
| (Spain) Javi Navarro | 12 | Ceuta |

=== Top goalkeepers ===
Last updated 15 May 2011

| Goalkeeper | Goals | Matches | Average | Team |
|---|---|---|---|---|
| (Spain) Alberto Cifuentes | 20 | 37 | 0.54 | Real Murcia |
| (Spain) Álvaro Campos | 20 | 27 | 0.74 | Cádiz |
| (Spain) Pedro Dorronsoro | 28 | 37 | 0.76 | Melilla |
| (Spain) Pau Torres | 31 | 35 | 0.89 | San Roque |
| (Spain) Manolo Rodríguez | 34 | 34 | 1 | Caravaca |
