= Albert Puigdollers =

Spanish footballer

Personal information
- Full name: Albert Puigdollers Saperas
- Date of birth: 30 October 1980 (age 45)
- Place of birth: Granollers, Spain
- Height: 1.78 m (5 ft 10 in)
- Position: Defensive midfielder

Youth career
- 1990–1996: Granollers
- 1996–1998: Barcelona

Senior career*
Years	Team	Apps	(Gls)
1998–2000	Barcelona C	74	(7)
1999–2001	Barcelona B	21	(0)
2001–2003	Atlético Madrid B	61	(3)
2003–2004	Málaga B	21	(3)
2004–2005	Cultural Leonesa	42	(4)
2006–2007	Badalona	27	(1)
2007–2009	Gavà	69	(5)
2009–2012	Sabadell	85	(7)
2012	Cowdenbeath	4	(0)
2013	Recreativo	12	(0)
2013–2014	Badalona	27	(2)
Total		443	(32)

International career
2011	Catalonia	1	(0)
- * Club domestic league appearances and goals

Albert Puigdollers Saperas (born 30 October 1980 in Granollers, Barcelona, Catalonia) is a Spanish former professional footballer who played as a defensive midfielder.
