= Carles Martínez =

Spanish footballer (born 1988)

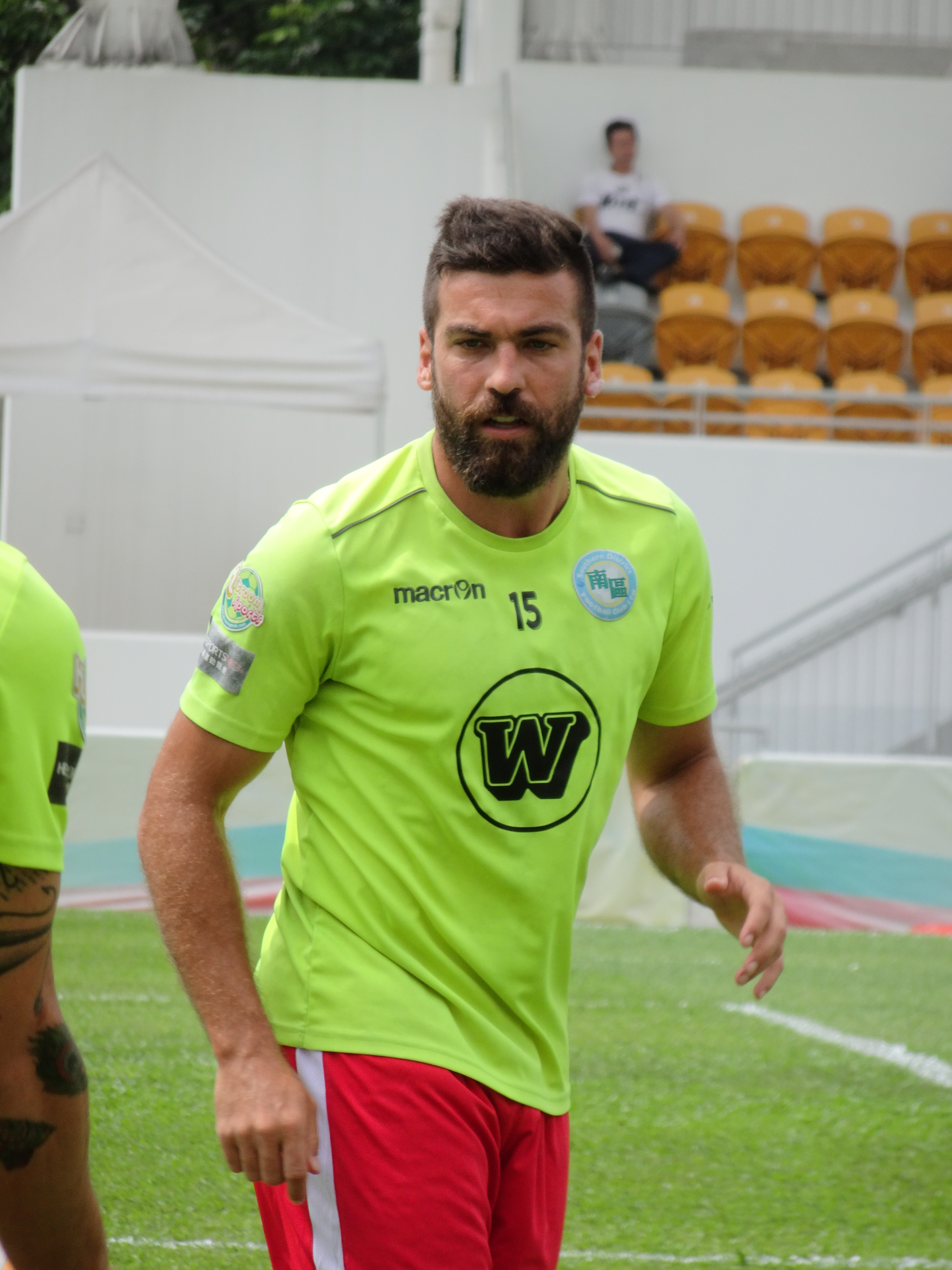
- Martínez in 2018

Personal information
- Full name: Carles Marc Martínez Embuena
- Date of birth: 3 January 1988 (age 38)
- Place of birth: Paiporta, Spain
- Height: 1.80 m (5 ft 11 in)
- Position: Defensive midfielder

Youth career
- Valencia

Senior career*
Years	Team	Apps	(Gls)
2006–2010	Valencia B	71	(5)
2010–2011	Murcia	15	(0)
2011–2012	San Roque	35	(1)
2012–2013	Getafe B	35	(0)
2013–2015	Piast Gliwice	50	(0)
2015–2016	Atlético Baleares	21	(0)
2016	Zagłębie Sosnowiec	9	(0)
2016	ASA Târgu Mureș	0	(0)
2016–2017	Guijuelo	31	(0)
2017–2018	Southern	15	(0)
2018–2021	Barakaldo	71	(2)
Total		353	(8)

International career
2004	Spain U16	1	(0)
2005	Spain U17	4	(0)
- * Club domestic league appearances and goals

Carles Marc Martínez Embuena (born 3 January 1988 in Paiporta, Valencian Community) is a Spanish former professional footballer who played as a defensive midfielder.
