= César Remón =

Spanish footballer

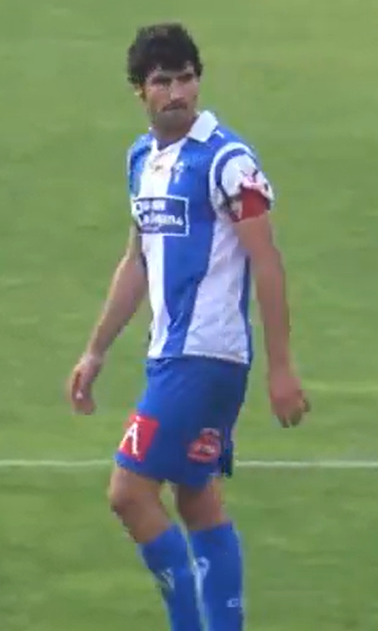
- Remón playing for Alcoyano in 2013

Personal information
- Full name: César Jesús Remón Aguirre
- Date of birth: 2 October 1985 (age 41)
- Place of birth: Logroño, Spain
- Height: 1.83 m (6 ft 0 in)
- Position: Midfielder

Team information
- Current team: Mirandés (assistant)

Youth career
- Loyola
- 2002–2003: Alavés

Senior career*
Years	Team	Apps	(Gls)
2003–2005	Alavés C	34	(7)
2005	Alavés B	3	(0)
2005–2006	Peralta	34	(5)
2006–2008	Castellón B	64	(9)
2008–2009	Alfaro	29	(2)
2009–2010	Dénia	36	(8)
2010–2011	Ontinyent	14	(0)
2011–2015	Alcoyano	123	(13)
2015–2017	UCAM Murcia	59	(3)
2017–2019	Logroñés	52	(1)
Total		448	(48)

Managerial career
- 2026–: Mirandés (assistant)
- * Club domestic league appearances and goals

César Jesús Remón Aguirre (born 2 October 1985 in Logroño, La Rioja) is a Spanish former footballer who played as a midfielder, and the current assistant manager of CD Mirandés.
