= Adolfo Miranda =

Spanish footballer (born 1989)

Fito
Personal information
- Full name: Adolfo Miranda Araujo
- Date of birth: 14 October 1989 (age 37)
- Place of birth: Barcelona, Spain
- Height: 1.79 m (5 ft 10 1/2 in)
- Position: Midfielder

Youth career
- Júpiter

Senior career*
Years	Team	Apps	(Gls)
2007–2008	Júpiter		
2008–2010	Sabadell B		
2008–2009	→ Castellar (loan)		
2009–2013	Sabadell	65	(5)
2013–2014	Huesca	24	(9)
2015	Castellón	4	(0)
2015–2017	Burgos	56	(7)
2017–2018	Cornellà	38	(6)
2018–2019	Cartagena	13	(3)
2019–2020	Chennai City	12	(4)
2020–2021	Atlético Baleares	19	(1)
2021–2022	Linense	8	(0)
- * Club domestic league appearances and goals as of 18:29, 5 June 2022 (UTC)

Adolfo Miranda Araujo (born 14 October 1989), commonly known as Fito, is a Spanish professional footballer who plays as a forward.
