= Julián Robles (footballer) =

Spanish footballer (born 1981)

Personal information
- Full name: Julián Robles García
- Date of birth: 28 March 1981 (age 45)
- Place of birth: Palma, Spain
- Height: 1.84 m (6 ft 1/2 in)
- Position: Midfielder

Youth career
- Mallorca

Senior career*
Years	Team	Apps	(Gls)
1999–2002	Mallorca B	50	(2)
2000–2004	Mallorca	31	(2)
2003–2004	→ Ciudad Murcia (loan)	33	(1)
2004–2006	Valladolid	59	(1)
2006–2009	Poli Ejido	68	(1)
2009–2011	Sabadell	65	(4)
2011–2012	Badalona	28	(2)
Total		334	(13)

International career
2000	Spain U18	2	(0)
2001	Spain U20	1	(0)
2002–2003	Spain U21	6	(0)

Managerial career
- 2014–2016: Mallorca B (assistant)
- 2016–2017: Mallorca (assistant)
- 2017–2018: Mallorca (youth)
- 2018–2023: Mallorca B
- * Club domestic league appearances and goals

Julián Robles García (born 28 March 1981 in Palma de Mallorca, Balearic Islands) is a Spanish retired professional footballer who played as a midfielder, currently a manager.

== Managerial statistics ==
As of match played 14 May 2023

Managerial record by team and tenure
Team	Nat	From	To	Record								Ref
Team	Nat	From	To	G	W	D	L	GF	GA	GD	Win %	Ref
Mallorca B	(Spain)	29 June 2018	3 June 2023	178	105	35	38	344	142	+202	58.99	
Total				178	105	35	38	344	142	+202	58.99	—

== Honours ==
Mallorca

- Copa del Rey: 2002–03
