= Chando =

Spanish footballer

Personal information
- Full name: Alejandro Torres Román
- Date of birth: 18 June 1982 (age 44)
- Place of birth: Palma, Spain
- Height: 1.79 m (5 ft 10 in)
- Position: Striker

Youth career
- Mallorca

Senior career*
| Years | Team | Apps | (Gls) |
| 1998–2002 | Mallorca B | 48 | (8) |
| 2000–2001 | → Ferriolense (loan) | | |
| 2002–2004 | Betis B | 53 | (9) |
| 2004–2006 | Reus | 36 | (17) |
| 2006–2008 | Lorca Deportiva | 33 | (14) |
| 2006–2007 | → Orihuela (loan) | 17 | (4) |
| 2007 | → Zamora (loan) | 16 | (3) |
| 2008–2009 | Villarreal B | 42 | (25) |
| 2009–2012 | Murcia | 110 | (34) |
| 2013 | AEK Larnaca | 16 | (8) |
| 2013–2014 | Girona | 20 | (1) |
| 2014–2017 | Atlético Baleares | 53 | (17) |
| Total | | 444 | (140) |
- * Club domestic league appearances and goals

Alejandro Torres Román (born 18 June 1982 in Palma de Mallorca, Balearic Islands), known as Chando, is a Spanish former professional footballer who played as a striker.
