= Estadio Municipal Los Arcos =

Football ground in Orihuela, Spain

Coordinates: 38°05′N 0°57′W

Los Arcos
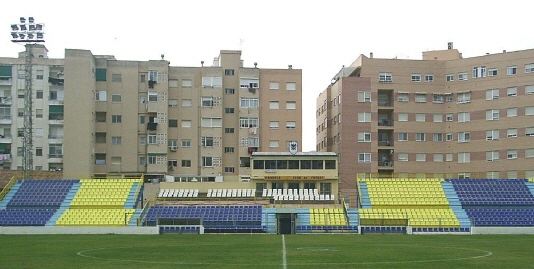
- Interactive map of Los Arcos
- Full name: Estadio Municipal de Los Arcos
- Location: Orihuela, Spain
- Owner: Ayuntamiento de Orihuela
- Capacity: 7,000
- Surface: Grass
- Field size: 103 x 65 m

Construction
- Built: 1944-1945
- Opened: 13 May 1945
- Renovated: 1990, 2001 and 2002

Tenant
- Orihuela CF

Estadio Municipal de Los Arcos is a football ground in Orihuela in Valencian Community, Spain. It is the home of the Orihuela CF football team.

The first official match played in Los Arcos was a Torneo Vega Baja game organized by Federación Murciana de Fútbol on May 13, 1945. The former Orihuela Deportiva beat CD Torrevejense 5-1.

However, the official opening was several months later, on December 26, 1945. The bishop of Orihuela José García Goldáraz blessed the ground and a friendly match was played, where Orihuela Deportiva lost to Primera División team Real Murcia.

The most important renovation took place in 1990. After the promotion of Orihuela Deportiva to Segunda División, the highest stands of the grandstand were built. In 2001 and 2002 some minor renovations were made: the seats were placed, the current electronic scoreboard was installed and the fencing around the pitch was removed. In addition, the stands were all painted blue and yellow, giving the ground its current appearance.

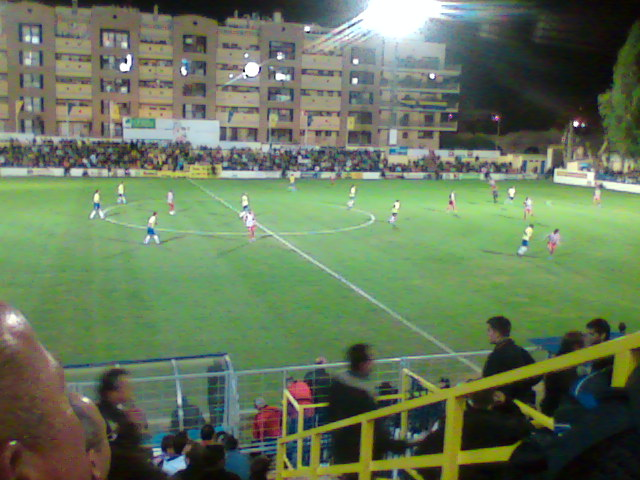
Orihuela CF in a match against Atlético Madrid

Estadio Municipal Los Arcos

== See also ==
- Orihuela CF
- Orihuela Deportiva CF
