= Camp del Centenari =

Stadium in Badalona, Catalonia, Spain

Coordinates: 41.457121°N 2.251135°E

- Interactive map of Camp del Centenari
- Location: Badalona, Catalonia, Spain
- Capacity: 10,000
- Surface: Grass

Construction
- Opened: 1936
- Demolished: 2015

Tenants
- CF Badalona

Camp del Centenari was a stadium in Badalona, Catalonia, Spain. It was used for football matches and was the home stadium of CF Badalona. The stadium held 10,000 spectators and was demolished in 2015.
