= Luismi (footballer, born 1979) =

Spanish footballer

Personal information
- Full name: Luis Miguel Loro Santiago
- Date of birth: 4 September 1979 (age 47)
- Place of birth: Fuenlabrada, Spain
- Height: 1.75 m (5 ft 9 in)
- Position: Forward

Youth career
- Fuenlabrada

Senior career*
Years	Team	Apps	(Gls)
1998–2001	Fuenlabrada	79	(25)
2001–2005	Levante B	36	(4)
2001–2006	Levante	8	(0)
2001–2002	→ Conquense (loan)	21	(8)
2003–2004	→ Novelda (loan)	33	(6)
2006	→ Cartagena (loan)	13	(0)
2006–2007	Logroñés	33	(6)
2007–2010	Benidorm	104	(31)
2010–2011	Castellón	36	(17)
2011–2012	Elche	9	(0)
2012–2014	Tenerife	70	(17)
2014–2015	Huracán	33	(8)
2015–2016	Olímpic Xàtiva	35	(5)
Total		510	(127)
- * Club domestic league appearances and goals

Luis Miguel Loro Santiago (born 4 September 1979 in Fuenlabrada, Madrid), known as Luismi, is a Spanish former professional footballer who played as a forward.
