= 2011–12 CE Sabadell FC season =

Sabadell
2011–12 season
- Chairman: Joan Soteras
- Manager: Lluís Carreras
- Stadium: Nova Creu Alta
- Liga Adelante: 19th
- Copa del Rey: Second Qualifying Round
- Top goalscorer: League: Lanzarote (9); All: Lanzarote (9)
- Highest home attendance: 7500 (CE Sabadell – Almería)
- Lowest home attendance: 2900 (CE Sabadell – Elche)
- Average home league attendance: 4857
Home colours	Away colours	Third colours

The 2011–12 Spanish football season was the first for CE Sabadell in the second level since 1993, when the team was relegated for not paying its players. After a stunning season in Segunda División B, the team promoted via play-off and was runner-up in the overall season, being surpassed only by Real Murcia (also promoted), who won on penalties in the play-off final matches (agg. 1–1 a.e.t, 8–9 p.s.o). During early June, Joan Soteras confirmed that the team manager, Lluís Carreras renewed for this season after the rumors emerged in April that linked him with FC Barcelona B.

Sabadell finished the season in 19th place, which would normally have resulted in an immediate return to Segunda B. However, they were reprieved from relegation when Villarreal were relegated from La Liga at the end of the season. Villarreal's relegation from La Liga meant that their reserve side, Villarreal B, would automatically drop to Segunda B.

== Trophies balance ==
Category	Trophy	Started round	First match	Result	Last match
Friendly Trophy	2011–12 Copa Catalunya	Fourth Qualifying Round	7 August 2011	Fifth Qualifying Round	14 September 2011
Competitive	Liga Adelante	—	27 August 2011	19th	2 or 3 June 2012
Competitive	Copa del Rey	Second Qualifying Round	6 September 2011	Second Qualifying Round	6 September 2011

=== Competitive Balance ===
Biggest win
	Home				Away			
Liga Adelante	28 January 2012	Matchday 22	v. Xerez CD	2 – 0	3 September 2011	Matchday 3	v. Villarreal B	3 – 4
Liga Adelante	11 February 2012	Matchday 24	v. Villarreal B	3 – 1	1 October 2011	Matchday 7	v. FC Barcelona B	0 – 1
Copa del Rey	None due to the elimination in the Second Qualifying Round							
Biggest loss
	Home				Away			
Liga Adelante	12 November 2011	Matchday 13	v. Córdoba	0 – 3	6 November 2011	Matchday 12	v. Nàstic Tarragona	5 – 0
Liga Adelante	7 January 2012	Matchday 19	v. Real Valladolid	1 – 4	6 November 2011	Matchday 12	v. Nàstic Tarragona	5 – 0
Copa del Rey	None due to the elimination in the Second Qualifying Round				6 September 2011	Second Qualifying Round	v. AD Alcorcón	2 – 1

== Summer transfers ==
=== In ===
(substituted on) In (15 players)
Player	From	Fee
(Spain) Héctor Simón	(Spain) Castellón	Free
(France) Thierry Florian	(Spain) Orihuela	Free
(Spain) Òscar Ramírez	(Spain) Badalona	Free
(Spain) Samuel Baños	(Spain) AD Alcorcón	Free
(Spain) Manuel Lanzarote	(Spain) SD Eibar	Free
(Spain) Jesús Olmo	(Spain) Puertollano	Free
(Spain) Ian Mackay	(Spain) SD Ponferradina	Free
(Spain) David Arteaga	(Spain) Córdoba	Free
(Spain) Aarón Bueno	(Spain) Cádiz	Free
(Spain) Manuel Redondo	(Spain) SD Ponferradina	Free
(Spain) Juanjo Ciércoles	(Spain) RCD Espanyol B	Free
(Morocco) Nabil Baha	(Greece) AEK Athens	Free
(Spain) Iván Gómez	Free agent	
(Spain) Pablo Ruiz	(Spain) FC Cartagena	Free
(Cameroon) Yann Songo'o	(Spain) Real Zaragoza B	Free

=== Out ===
(substituted off) Out (9 players)
Player	New Team	Fee
(Spain) Marc Fernández	(Spain) FC Cartagena	Free
(Spain) Chapi Arnau	(Spain) AD Ceuta	Free
(Spain) Julián Robles	(Spain) Badalona	Free
(Spain) Alberto Manga	(Spain) Badalona	Free
(Spain) Mikel Azparren	(Spain) Lleida Esportiu	Free
(Spain) Aitor Ramírez	(Spain) SD Ponferradina	Free
(Spain) Raúl Rodríguez	(Spain) Castellón	Free
(Spain) Pep Pagès	(Spain) Igualada	Free
(Spain) Àlex Ruiz	(Spain) UE Llagostera	Free

=== Loan in ===
(substituted on) Loan in (1 player)
Player	From
(Spain) Álex Cruz	(Spain) Granada

=== Loan return ===
(substituted on) Loan return (1 player)
Italics for players returning to the club but left it during pre-season
Player	From
(Spain) Víctor Rodríguez	(Spain) CE Premià; Although he will play for the "B" team.
(Spain) Aitor Ramírez	(Spain) CD Dénia

=== Loan end ===
(substituted off) Loan end (2 players)
Player	Returns to
(Japan) Hiroshi Ibusuki	(Spain) Girona; Then, sold to (Spain) Sevilla Atlético
(Spain) Isaac Cuenca	(Spain) FC Barcelona B
(Spain) Juanjo Ciércoles	(Spain) RCD Espanyol B

== Winter transfers ==
=== In ===
(substituted on) In (2 players)
Player	From	Fee
(Spain) Francesc Piera	(Spain) Puertollano	Free
(Spain) Antonio Hidalgo	(Spain) CD Tenerife	Free

=== Out ===
(substituted off) Out (3 players)
Player	New Team	Fee
(Cameroon) Yann Songo'o	(Spain) Pobla de Mafumet CF	Free
(Spain) Iván Gómez	Retired	
(Spain) Joaquín Rodríguez	Free agent	

=== Loan in ===
(substituted on) Loan in (2 players)
Player	From
(Spain) Ezequiel Calvente	(Spain) Real Betis
(Uruguay) Adrián Luna	(Spain) RCD Espanyol; Previously on loan in (Spain) Nàstic Tarragona

== Current squad ==
=== Squad ===
- Updated to 31 January 2012

Note: Flags indicate national team as defined under FIFA eligibility rules; some limited exceptions apply. Players may hold more than one non-FIFA nationality.

No.	Pos.	Nation	Player
1	GK	ESP	David De Navas
2	MF	ESP	Antonio Hidalgo
3	DF	ESP	David Bermudo
4	MF	ESP	Juanjo Ciércoles
5	DF	ESP	Agustín Fernández
6	MF	ESP	Hèctor Simón
7	DF	ESP	Òscar Ramírez
8	MF	ESP	Albert Puigdollers
10	MF	EQG	Juvenal Edjogo
11	MF	ESP	Francesc Piera
12	MF	ESP	Manuel Lanzarote
13	GK	ESP	Ian Mackay
14	FW	MAR	Nabil Baha
15	DF	ESP	Pablo Ruiz

No.	Pos.	Nation	Player
16	MF	ESP	Samuel Baños
17	DF	ESP	Toni Lao
18	DF	ESP	Manuel Redondo
19	MF	FRA	Thierry Florian
20	MF	ESP	Álex Cruz (On loan from Granada)
21	MF	ESP	Ezequiel Calvente (On loan from Real Betis)
22	FW	ESP	Aarón Bueno
23	MF	ESP	David Arteaga
24	DF	ESP	Jesús Olmo
25	MF	URU	Adrián Luna (On loan from RCD Espanyol)
–	MF	ESP	Fito Miranda (Long-term injured)
–	GK	ESP	Oriol Torres (Long-term injured)
–	MF	ESP	Eneko Fernández (Long-term injured)

=== Youth system ===
Note: Flags indicate national team as defined under FIFA eligibility rules; some limited exceptions apply. Players may hold more than one non-FIFA nationality.

No.	Pos.	Nation	Player
40	MF	ESP	Aleix Domínguez
—	FW	ESP	Nelbert Barbosa
—	MF	ESP	Mario Quereda
—	MF	ESP	Miguel Ángel Chica
—	DF	ESP	César Molina

No.	Pos.	Nation	Player
—	MF	ESP	Toni Delgado
—	MF	ESP	Pinilla
—	MF	ESP	Sergio
—	MF	ESP	Jonathan Collado
—	GK	ESP	Manu

=== Called up by their national football team ===
List of players called up by their national team
10	Juvenal Edjogo	Equatorial Guinea	v. Guinea-Bissau (10 August 2011) v. Burkina Faso (3 September 2011) v. Central African Republic (7 September 2011) v. Gabon (7 October 2011) v. Cameroon (11 October 2011) v. Madagascar (11 November 2011) v. Madagascar (15 November 2011) v. South Africa (6 January 2012) v. Cotonsport (13 January 2012) v. Libya (21 January 2012) v. Senegal (25 January 2012) v. Zambia (29 January 2012) v. Ivory Coast (4 February 2012) v. Tunisia (2 June 2012) v. Sierra Leone (9 June 2012)

== Match stats ==
No.	Pos.	Player	Goal		Booked		(yellow card) (yellow-red card)		Sent off (straight red)	
No.	Pos.	Player	League	Cup	League	Cup	League	Cup	League	Cup
1	GK	(Spain) David de Navas			3					
2	MF	(Spain) Antonio Hidalgo	2		5					
3	DF	(Spain) David Bermudo			4					
4	MF	(Spain) Juanjo Ciércoles			13					
5	DF	(Spain) Agustín Fernández	1		2				1	
6	MF	(Spain) Hèctor Simón	1		11			1		
7	DF	(Spain) Òscar Ramírez			8					
8	MF	(Spain) Albert Puigdollers	1		2					
9	FW	(Spain) Joaquín Rodríguez (Out)			1					
10	MF	(Equatorial Guinea) Juvenal Edjogo	4		5					
11	MF	(Spain) Eneko Fernández (Long time injured)								
11	MF	(Spain) Francesc Piera			2					
12	MF	(Spain) Manuel Lanzarote	9		6					
13	GK	(Spain) Ian Mackay			1					
14	FW	(Morocco) Nabil Baha	5		7		1			
15	DF	(Spain) Pablo Ruiz			6					
16	MF	(Spain) Samuel Baños			3					
17	DF	(Spain) Toni Lao	1		7					
18	DF	(Spain) Manuel Redondo			5					
19	MF	(France) Thierry Florian	6		4		1			
20	MF	(Spain) Álex Cruz			1					
21	MF	(Spain) Fito Miranda (Long time injured)		1						
21	MF	(Spain) Ezequiel Calvente	2		2					
22	FW	(Spain) Aarón Bueno	6		4					
23	MF	(Spain) David Arteaga	3		4					
24	DF	(Spain) Jesús Olmo	3		7		2			
25	FW	(Uruguay) Adrián Luna			3					
49	DF	(Cameroon) Yann Songo'o (Out)			1	1				

== Match results ==
=== Pre-season and friendly tournaments ===
==== Friendly matches ====
24 July 2011	UE Olot (Spain)	0–0	(Spain) CE Sabadell	Olot (Girona)
19:00 CEST	Roca (yellow card)	(Report)	(yellow card) Agustín	Stadium: Municipal d'Olot; Referee: (Spain) (Catalonia) Quintana Carmona

27 July 2011	UE Llagostera (Spain)	1–0	(Spain) CE Sabadell	Sant Julià del Llor i Bonmatí (Girona)
19:30 CEST	Granell 6'; Rangel (yellow card); Banal (yellow card)	(Report)	(yellow card) Pinilla	Stadium: Municipal de Bonmatí; Attendance: 200; Referee: (Spain) (Catalonia) Díaz Rubio

30 July 2011	Palamós (Spain)	0–1	(Spain) CE Sabadell	Palamós (Girona)
19:30 CEST	Barrera (yellow card)		89' (pen.), (yellow card) Juvenal; (yellow card) Pinilla	Stadium: Nou Municipal de Palamós; Attendance: 300; Referee: (Spain) (Catalonia) Ponsatí Claveguera

9 August 2011	Reus Deportiu (Spain)	1–0	(Spain) CE Sabadell	Reus (Tarragona)
20:30 CEST	Sergio León 38'	(Report)	(yellow card) Florian	Stadium: Nou Municipal de Reus; Attendance: 500; Referee: (Spain) (Catalonia) Sánchez Rico

12 August 2011	CE Sabadell (Spain)	1–2	(Spain) RCD Espanyol	Sabadell (Barcelona)
21:30 CEST	Aarón 81' (pen.)	(Report); Live TV: Esport3	45' (o.g.) Florian; 83' Thievy	Stadium: Nova Creu Alta; Attendance: 1,700; Referee: (Spain) (La Rioja) Ocón Arraiz

17 August 2011	CE Sabadell (Spain)	2–0	(Spain) Badalona	Sabadell (Barcelona)
19:00 CEST	Lanzarote 17'; Ceballos 37' (o.g.)	(Report)		Stadium: Nova Creu Alta; Attendance: 600; Referee: (Spain) (Catalonia) Medie Jiménez

31 August 2011	Terrassa Olímpica 2010 (Spain)	0–1	(Spain) CE Sabadell	Castellar del Vallès (Barcelona)
20:00 CEST			19' Eneko	Stadium: Municipal Pepín Valls

31 August 2011	UE Castellar (Spain)	1–3	(Spain) CE Sabadell	Castellar del Vallès (Barcelona)
21:00 CEST	Mayoral 35'		5' Baha; 12' Lanzarote; 33' Aarón	Stadium: Municipal Pepín Valls

==== 2011–12 Copa Catalunya ====
7 August 2011 4th Q. Round	Terrassa Olímpica 2010 (Spain)	0–1	(Spain) CE Sabadell	Terrassa (Barcelona)
19:00 CEST	Pep Arau (yellow card); Erencia (yellow card)	(Report)	79' Florian; (yellow card) Eneko; (yellow card) Bueno; (yellow card) Simón; (yellow card) Redondo	Stadium: Olímpic de Terrassa; Attendance: 300; Referee: (Spain) (Catalonia) Martín Navàs

14 September 2011 5th Q. Round	Unificación Santa Perpètua (Spain)	2–1	(Spain) CE Sabadell	Santa Perpètua de Mogoda (Barcelona)
20:30 CEST	Moreno 1'; Luque 50', (yellow card); Víctor (yellow card)	(Report)	12' Eneko; (yellow card) (yellow-red card) 63' César; (yellow card) Ruiz; (yellow card) Pesqui; (yellow card) , (red card) 90' Samuel; (yellow card) Eric; (yellow card) Ciércoles	Stadium: Centre de Futbol Municipal 1 Attendance: 800; Referee: (Spain) (Catalonia) Asensio Tejero

=== Liga Adelante ===
Matchday	2	3	4	5	6	7	8	9	10	1	11	12	13	14	15	16	17	18	19	20	21	22	23	24	25	26	27	28	29	31	32	33	34	35	36	37	38	39	40	30	41	42
Against	SDH	VilB	FCC	DEP	HÉR	FCB	RHU	ALC	GUA	XER	ACY	NÀS	CÓR	GIR	RMU	CEL	ELC	ALM	RV	NUM	LPA	XER	SDH	VilB	FCC	DEP	HÉR	FCB	RHU	GUA	ACY	NÀS	CÓR	GIR	RMU	CEL	ELC	ALM	RV	ALC	NUM	LPA
Venue	H	A	H	A	H	A	H	H	A	A	H	A	H	A	H	A	H	A	H	A	H	H	A	H	A	H	A	H	A	H	A	H	A	H	A	H	A	H	A	A	H	A
Position	6	5	2	3	5	3	2	2	2	2	3	5	9	9	9	12	11	13	14	15	15	15	14	12	14	12	13	14	13	13	15	12	12	14	16	17	17	14	16	17	19	19
Goal Average (useful in case of tie)																						Won	Won	Won	Lost	Won	Lost	Won	Won	Lost	Lost	Lost	Lost	Lost	Lost	Lost	Drawn	Lost	Lost	Drawn	Lost	Lost

Win Draw Lost

		All							Home							Away						
		Pts	W	D	L	F	A	Dif.	Pts	W	D	L	F	A	Dif.	Pts	W	D	L	F	A	Dif.
19	CE Sabadell	46	11	13	18	45	64	–19	34	9	7	5	29	28	+1	12	2	6	13	16	36	–20

Liga Adelante Winners (also promoted)
Direct promotion to Liga BBVA (Liga Adelante Runners-up)
Liga BBVA promotion play-offs
Relegation to Segunda División B (From 13 May: The 19th qualified won't be relegated as Villarreal CF were relegated from Liga BBVA and Villarreal B were also relegated to Segunda División B, consequently)

27 August 2011 2	CE Sabadell	2–1	SD Huesca	Sabadell (Barcelona)
18:00 CEST	Simón (yellow card) 43'; Olmo 66', 85'	(Report); Live TV: Esport3 / Aragón TV	(yellow card) 37' Helguera; 52' Camacho; (yellow card) 57', (red card) 81' R. Sastre; (yellow card) 59' L. Sastre; (yellow card) 61' Tariq; (yellow card) 85' Molina	Stadium: Nova Creu Alta; Referee: (Valencian Community) Juan Martínez Munuera

3 September 2011 3	Villarreal B	3–4	CE Sabadell	Vila-Real (Castellón)
18:00 CEST	Airam 29'; Joselu 75'; Dervite (yellow card) 86'; Iriome 89'	(Report); Live TV: / Esport3	36', 90+1' Florian; (yellow card) 46' Lao; 73' Aarón; 81' Lanzarote; (yellow card) 87' Puigdollers	Stadium: Ciudad Deportiva; Referee: (Andalusia) Melero López

10 September 2011 4	CE Sabadell	3–2	FC Cartagena	Sabadell (Barcelona)
18:00 CEST	Aarón 43'; Lanzarote 48'; Arteaga 67'; Baha (yellow card) 88'	(Report); Live TV: Esport3 / 7RM	24', 59' Bolado; (yellow card) 34' (yellow-red card) 44' Antón; (yellow card) 36' Fernández; (yellow card) 45' Juanma; (yellow card) 64' Dimas	Stadium: Nova Creu Alta; Referee: (Castile and León) Valdés Aller

17 September 2011 5	Deportivo	2–1	CE Sabadell	A Coruña
18:00 CEST	Aythami (yellow card) 36'; Valerón 39'; Guardado 44'; Ayoze (yellow card) 60'; Salomão (yellow card) 89'	(Report); Live TV: tvG2 / TVC	(yellow card) 46' Ramírez; 73', (yellow card) 88' Baha; (yellow card) 87' Olmo	Stadium: Riazor; Referee: (Extremadura) Gil Manzano

24 September 2011 6	CE Sabadell	1–1	Hércules	Sabadell (Barcelona)
16:00 CEST	Arteaga 10'; Juvenal (yellow card) 20'; Simón (yellow card) 70'	(Report); Live TV:	(yellow card) 18' Samuel; (yellow card) 23' Mora; 31', (yellow card) 80' Míchel; (yellow card) 69' Calvo	Stadium: Nova Creu Alta; Referee: (La Rioja) Ocón Arráiz

1 October 2011 7	FC Barcelona B	0–1	CE Sabadell	Barcelona
18:00 CEST	Bartra (yellow card) 77'	(Report); Live TV: Esport3	40' Juvenal; (yellow card) 89' Ciércoles	Stadium: Mini Estadi; Referee: (Cantabria) Arias López

10 October 2011 8	CE Sabadell	1–0	Recreativo Huelva	Sabadell (Barcelona)
21:00 CEST	Puigdollers 28'; Ruiz (yellow card) 49'; Ciércoles (yellow card) 58'; Florian (yellow card) 71'; Lanzarote (yellow card) 79'; De Navas (yellow card) 89'	(Report); Live TV: GolT	(yellow card) 43' Martínez; (yellow card) 66' Navarro	Stadium: Nova Creu Alta; Referee: (Balearic Islands) Sureda Cuenca

15 October 2011 9	CE Sabadell	1–0	AD Alcorcón	Sabadell (Barcelona)
18:00 CEST	Aarón 9' (pen.); Olmo (yellow card) 17' (yellow-red card) 44'; Puigdollers (yellow card) 30'	(Report); Live TV: Esport3 / LaOtra	(yellow card) 5' Anuarbe; (yellow card) 8' Rueda; (yellow card) 48' Quini; (yellow card) 54' Babin; (yellow card) 75' Martínez; (yellow card) 79' Abraham; (yellow card) 88' Sales; (yellow card) 89' Miguélez	Stadium: Nova Creu Alta; Referee: (Galicia (Spain)) Amoedo Chas

21 October 2011 10	Guadalajara	1–0	CE Sabadell	Guadalajara
21:00 CEST	Ernesto 63'; Badía (yellow card) 82'	(Report); Live TV: GolT / C+ Liga	(yellow card) 89' Simón	Stadium: Pedro Escartín; Referee: (Valencian Community) Juan Martínez Munuera

26 October 2011 1	Xerez CD	2–2	CE Sabadell	Jerez de la Frontera (Cádiz)
21:00 CEST	Tato 6'; Cámara (yellow card) 14'; Robusté 27', (yellow card) 81'; Lombán (yellow card) 71'	(Report)	32' Lanzarote; (yellow card) 37' Arteaga; 72' (pen.) Juvenal; (yellow card) 87' Lao	Stadium: Chapín; Referee: (Castilla–La Mancha) Arcediano Monescillo

29 October 2011 11	CE Sabadell	2–2	Alcoyano	Sabadell (Barcelona)
18:00 CEST	Florian 23'; Songo'o (yellow card) 48'; Rodríguez (yellow card) 82'; Lao 87'	(Report)	21', 27', (yellow card) 49' Gato; (yellow card) 37' Miranda; (yellow card) 50' Lozano; (yellow card) 70' Fabiani	Stadium: Nova Creu Alta; Referee: (Canary Islands) Hernández Hernández

6 November 2011 12	Nàstic Tarragona	5–0	CE Sabadell	Tarragona
12:00 CET	Morán 18'; Powel 26', 58'; Tuni 61'; Luna 82'	(Report); Live TV: Canal+ 1	(yellow card) 11' Olmo; (yellow card) 36' Ciércoles	Stadium: Nou Estadi; Referee: (Andalusia) Mariscal Sánchez

12 November 2011 13	CE Sabadell	0–3	Córdoba	Sabadell (Barcelona)
22:00 CET	Olmo (yellow card) 41'; Simón (yellow card) 70'	(Report); Live TV:	12' Patiño; (yellow card) 45' Gaspar; 57' Charles; 69' López Silva; (yellow card) 74' García; (yellow card) 75' Díaz	Stadium: Nova Creu Alta; Referee: (Basque Country (autonomous community)) Ricardo de Burgos Bengoetxea

19 November 2011 14	Girona	1–1	CE Sabadell	Girona
18:00 CET	Benja (yellow card) 21'; Álvarez (yellow card) 25'; Moha 40'; Martínez (yellow card) 44'; Dorca (yellow card) 52'	(Report); Live TV: Esport3	10' Lanzarote; (yellow card) 31' Ramírez; (yellow card) 34' Bermudo; (yellow card) 50' Ciércoles; (yellow card) 71' (yellow-red card) 86' Olmo; (yellow card) 77' Simón; (yellow card) 89' Baha	Stadium: Montilivi; Referee: (Aragon) Jaime Latre

27 November 2011 15	CE Sabadell	2–2	Real Murcia	Sabadell (Barcelona)
21:30 CET	Lanzarote 13'; Florian (yellow card) 23'; Ciércoles (yellow card) 78'; Baha 80'; Ramírez (yellow card) 89'	(Report); Live TV: GolT / C+ Liga	(yellow card) 23' (yellow-red card) 63' Molinero; (yellow card) 29' Cerrajería; 40', (yellow card) 42' Pedro; 48' García; (yellow card) 73' Sánchez; (yellow card) 89' Alberto	Stadium: Nova Creu Alta; Referee: (Extremadura) López Acera

3 December 2011 16	Celta Vigo	4–1	CE Sabadell	Vigo (Pontevedra)
18:00 CET	Bermejo 33', 86'; De Lucas 44'; Túñez (yellow card) 65'; Joan Tomás 76', (yellow card) 79'; López (yellow card) 81'	(Report); Live TV: tvG2 / Esport3	(yellow card) 51' Lao; (yellow card) 63' (yellow-red card) 74' Florian; (yellow card) 75' Baha; 82' Olmo	Stadium: Balaídos; Referee: (Balearic Islands) Sureda Cuenca

10 December 2011 17	CE Sabadell	0–0	Elche	Sabadell (Barcelona)
16:00 CET	Lanzarote (yellow card) 37'; Ruiz (yellow card) 54'; Baha (yellow card) 55'; Ramírez (yellow card) 78'	Live TV:	(yellow card) 38' Albácar; (yellow card) 69' Palanca; (yellow card) 89' Ángel	Stadium: Nova Creu Alta; Referee: (Castilla–La Mancha) Pino Zamorano

18 December 2011 18	UD Almería	3–0	CE Sabadell	Almería
19:45 CET	Goitom 33', 44'; Corona (yellow card) 70'; Ulloa 83'	(Report); Live TV: GolT / C+ Liga	(yellow card) 22' Simón; (yellow card) 27' Redondo; (yellow card) 58' Piera; (yellow card) 79' Ruiz	Stadium: Juegos del Mediterráneo; Referee: (Galicia (Spain)) Amoedo Chas

7 January 2012 19	CE Sabadell	1–4	Real Valladolid	Sabadell (Barcelona)
18:00 CET	Lanzarote (yellow card) 19', (goal) 69'; Ruiz (yellow card) 87'	(Report); Live TV: Esport3	13', 22', 35' Guerra; (yellow card) 71' Sisi; 73' Marquitos	Stadium: Nova Creu Alta; Referee: (Basque Country (autonomous community)) Bikandi Garrido

14 January 2012 20	Numancia	2–1	CE Sabadell	Soria
18:00 CET	Bedoya 6', (yellow card) 36'; Pavón (yellow card) 51'; Lago Júnior 77'	(Report)	3', (yellow card) 7' (yellow-red card) 10' Baha; (yellow card) 57' De Navas; (yellow card) 69' Simón; (yellow card) 78' Lanzarote	Stadium: Los Pajaritos; Referee: (Navarre) Prieto Iglesias

21 January 2012 21	CE Sabadell	1–1	UD Las Palmas	Sabadell (Barcelona)
18:00 CET	Juanpe 13' (o.g.); Hidalgo (yellow card) 42'; Florian (yellow card) 61'; Aarón (yellow card) 87'	(Report); Live TV: TVC	(yellow card) 38' Suárez; (yellow card) 50' Laguardia; (yellow card) 58' Guerrero; (yellow card) 79' (yellow-red card) 81' González; (yellow card) 81' Viera; (yellow card) 87' Pignol; 90+1', (yellow card) 90+1' Juanpe	Stadium: Nova Creu Alta; Attendance: 4,100; Referee: (Region of Murcia) José María Sánchez Martínez

28 January 2012 22	CE Sabadell	2–0	Xerez CD	Sabadell (Barcelona)
18:00 CET	Lanzarote 13' (pen.); Ruiz (yellow card) 67'; Ciércoles (yellow card) 78'; Florian 82'; Redondo (yellow card) 90'	(Report)	(yellow card) 12' Robusté; (yellow card) 68' Vélez	Stadium: Nova Creu Alta; Referee: (Valencian Community) Juan Martínez Munuera

4 February 2012 23	SD Huesca	0–0	CE Sabadell	Huesca
18:00 CET	Llamas (yellow card) 71'	(Report); Live TV: Aragón TV	(yellow card) 38' Arteaga; (yellow card) 65' Redondo; (yellow card) 72' Hidalgo	Stadium: El Alcoraz; Referee: (Castilla–La Mancha) Pino Zamorano

11 February 2012 24	CE Sabadell	3–1	Villarreal B	Sabadell (Barcelona)
18:00 CET	Simón (yellow card) 29', (goal) 53'; Lanzarote 60'; Baha 84'	(Report)	(yellow card) 18' Toribio; (yellow card) 31', (goal) 90+1' Trigueros; (yellow card) 58' Truyols; (yellow card) 60' Pere; (yellow card) 70' Toño; (yellow card) 84' Kiko; (yellow card) 90' (yellow-red card) 90+1' Porcar	Stadium: Nova Creu Alta; Referee: (Galicia (Spain)) Amoedo Chas

18 February 2012 25	FC Cartagena	1–0	CE Sabadell	Cartagena
18:00 CET	Herrero (yellow card) 16'; Raimondi (yellow card) 29', (goal) 57'; Kijera (yellow card) 36'; Dimas (yellow card) 74'; Antón (yellow card) 86'; Font (yellow card) 88'	(Report)	(yellow card) 18' Hidalgo; (yellow card) 78' Cruz; (yellow card) 84' Redondo; (yellow card) 90' Ramírez	Stadium: Cartagonova; Referee: (Asturias) Piñeiro Crespo

25 February 2012 26	CE Sabadell	1–0	Deportivo de La Coruña	Sabadell (Barcelona)
18:00 CET	Lanzarote 44'; Agustín (yellow card) 87'	(Report); Live TV: tvG2 / Esport3	(yellow card) 13' Morel; (yellow card) 22' Laure; (red card) 90' Zé Castro; (yellow card) 90+1' Guardado	Stadium: Nova Creu Alta; Referee: (Extremadura) Gil Manzano

3 March 2012 27	Hércules	1–0	CE Sabadell	Alicante
16:00 CET	Samuel 59'; Vera (yellow card) 61'; Mora (yellow card) 73'	(Report); Live TV:	(yellow card) 34' Lao; (yellow card) 52' Hidalgo; (yellow card) 68' Olmo; (yellow card) 78' Florian; (yellow card) 85' Ezequiel; (yellow card) 86' Ciércoles; (yellow card) 88' Ruiz	Stadium: Rico Pérez; Referee: (Castile and León) Valdés Aller

10 March 2012 28	CE Sabadell	0–0	FC Barcelona B	Sabadell (Barcelona)
18:00 CET	Olmo (yellow card) 18'; Redondo (yellow card) 26'; Baha (yellow card) 33'	(Report); Live TV: Esport3	(yellow card) 24' Espinosa; (yellow card) 43' Gómez	Stadium: Nova Creu Alta; Referee: (Navarre) Prieto Iglesias

17 March 2012 29	Recreativo Huelva	1–1	CE Sabadell	Huelva
18:00 CET	Berrocal 25'; Rubio (yellow card) 89'	(Report); Live TV:	50' Arteaga; (yellow card) 60' Juvenal; (yellow card) 89' Ciércoles	Stadium: Nuevo Colombino; Referee: (Valencian Community) Juan Martínez Munuera

24 March 2012 31	CE Sabadell	2–2	CD Guadalajara	Sabadell (Barcelona)
18:00 CET	Hidalgo 42'; Lao (yellow card) 86'; Florian 90'	(Report); Live TV: Esport3 / CMT 2	38' Aníbal; 58', (red card) 78' Gerard; (yellow card) 61' Gago; (yellow card) 65' Moreno	Stadium: Nova Creu Alta; Referee: (Cantabria) Arias López

31 March 2012 32	Alcoyano	2–1	CE Sabadell	Alcoy (Alicante)
18:00 CEST	Torres 18', (yellow card) 37'; Morcillo (yellow card) 20'; Miranda (yellow card) 45'; Aloisio (yellow card) 46'; Cañadas (yellow card) 71'; Remón (yellow card) 73'; Pina (yellow card) 82'; García 86'	(Report)	(yellow card) 14' Bueno; (yellow card) 32' Lanzarote; 46' (pen.) Juvenal; (yellow card) 64' Ramírez; (yellow card) 89' Ciércoles	Stadium: El Collao; Referee: (Basque Country (autonomous community)) Bikandi Garrido

7 April 2012 33	CE Sabadell	1–0	Nàstic Tarragona	Sabadell (Barcelona)
18:00 CEST	Bueno 19'; Hidalgo (yellow card) 49'; Ciércoles (yellow card) 56'; Agustín (red card) 87'; Juvenal (yellow card) 89'	(Report); Live TV: Esport3	(yellow card) 23' Ortiz; (yellow card) 77' Longás	Stadium: Nova Creu Alta; Referee: (Andalusia) Melero López

14 April 2012 34	Córdoba	0–0	CE Sabadell	Córdoba
18:00 CEST	Navarro (yellow card) 16' (yellow-red card); Fernández (yellow card) 59'; López Garai (yellow card) 67'; Gaspar (yellow card) 85'	(Report); Live TV: Canal Sur	(yellow card) 32' Olmo; (yellow card) 42' Bermudo; (yellow card) 51' De Navas; (yellow card) 63' Baños; (yellow card) 67' Arteaga; (yellow card) 72' Simón; (yellow card) 84' Luna; (yellow card) 90' Aarón	Stadium: Nuevo Arcángel; Referee: (Canary Islands) Hernández Hernández

21 April 2012 35	CE Sabadell	2–3	Girona	Sabadell (Barcelona)
18:00 CEST	Aarón (yellow card) 9'; Ramírez (yellow card) 38'; Ezequiel 59'; Ciércoles (yellow card) 66'; Juvenal 76'; Bermudo (yellow card) 90'	(Report); Live TV: Esport3	18', (yellow card) 40' Acuña; (yellow card) 20' Dorca; (yellow card) 34' Tébar; 51', (yellow card) 71' Luso; 67' Moha; (yellow card) 80' Dani	Stadium: Nova Creu Alta; Referee: (Aragon) Jaime Latre

28 April 2012 36	Real Murcia	1–0	CE Sabadell	Murcia
18:00 CEST	Ruso 15'; Marín (yellow card) 17'; Iturra (yellow card) 42'; Isaac (yellow card) 65'; Emilio (yellow card) 83'; Richi (yellow card) 90'	(Report); Live TV: 7RM / Esport3	(yellow card) 34' Lao; (yellow card) 44' Arteaga; (yellow card) 88' Ezequiel	Stadium: Nueva Condomina; Referee: (Community of Madrid) Lesma López

5 May 2012 37	CE Sabadell	1–2	Celta Vigo	Sabadell (Barcelona)
18:00 CEST	Olmo (yellow card) 38'; Agustín 49'; Luna (yellow card) 74'	(Report); Live TV: Esport3 / tvG2	30' López; (yellow card) 54' Insa; 76' Orellana	Stadium: Nova Creu Alta; Attendance: 4,800; Referee: (Valencian Community) Juan Martínez Munuera

13 May 2012 38	Elche	1–1	CE Sabadell	Elche (Alicante)
18:00 CEST	Generelo (yellow card) 26'; Rodas (yellow card) 57'; Sánchez (yellow card) 73'; Béranger (yellow card) 76'; Bille Nielsen 86', (yellow card) 88'; Alberto (yellow card) 90+1'	(Report); Live TV: GolT / C+ Liga	56' Aarón; (yellow card) 67' Juvenal; (yellow card) 73' Lanzarote	Stadium: Martínez Valero; Attendance: 10,386; Referee: (Region of Murcia) José María Sánchez Martínez

16 May 2012 39	CE Sabadell	2–1	UD Almería	Sabadell (Barcelona)
20:00 CEST	Samuel (yellow card) 17'; Bueno 19'; Baha 22'; Lao (yellow card) 63'	(Report)	(yellow card) 44' Vidal; 64' (pen.), (yellow card) 73' Ulloa; (yellow card) 88' Jakobsen; (yellow card) 90' García	Stadium: Nova Creu Alta; Attendance: 7,200; Referee: (Asturias) Piñeiro Crespo

20 May 2012 40	Real Valladolid	2–0	CE Sabadell	Valladolid
21:30 CEST	Peña 36'; Bueno (yellow card) 45'; Pérez (yellow card) 85'; Sisi (yellow card) 90+1'; Nauzet 90+3'	(Report); Live TV:	(yellow card) 15' (yellow-red card) 66' Simón; (yellow card) 28' Luna	Stadium: Nuevo José Zorrilla; Attendance: 12,107; Referee: (La Rioja) Ocón Arráiz

23 May 2012 30	AD Alcorcón	1–0	CE Sabadell	Alcorcón (Madrid)
20:00 CEST	Sanz 84', (yellow card) 84'	(Report); Live TV: LaOtra / Esport3	(yellow card) 51' Ciércoles; (yellow card) 58' Piera; (yellow card) 67' Ramírez; (yellow card) 69' Mackay; (yellow card) 76' Agustín; (yellow card) 81' Juvenal	Stadium: Santo Domingo; Attendance: 4,500; Referee: (Basque Country (autonomous community)) Bikandi Garrido

27 May 2012 41	CE Sabadell	1–3	Numancia	Sabadell (Barcelona)
20:00 CEST	Simón (yellow card) 48'; Florian 86'	(Report)	8' Álvarez; (yellow card) 70' Pavón; 80' Natalio; 84' Díaz de Cerio; (yellow card) 88' Expósito	Stadium: Nova Creu Alta; Attendance: 3,100; Referee: (Andalusia) Melero López

2 June 2012 42	UD Las Palmas	3–2	CE Sabadell	Las Palmas de Gran Canaria
18:00 CEST; 17:00 Local time	F. Suárez 1'; Castellano (yellow card) 50'; Quiroga 53'; Vitolo 71'	(Report); Live TV: TVC / Esport3	11' Ezequiel; (yellow card) 38' Samuel; 50' (pen.) Hidalgo; (yellow card) 84' Bermudo; (yellow card) 90' Ciércoles	Stadium: Gran Canaria; Referee: (Community of Madrid) Lesma López

=== Copa del Rey ===
==== Second Qualifying Round ====
6 September 2011	AD Alcorcón	2–1	CE Sabadell	Alcorcón (Madrid)
20:00 CEST	Bermúdez (yellow card) 19'; Hernández (yellow card) 65'; Quini 90' (pen.); Abraham 90+2'	(Report); Live TV: GolT	(yellow card) 25' Songo'o; 85' Miranda	Stadium: Santo Domingo; Referee: (Andalusia) Mariscal Sánchez
