= 2012–13 CE Sabadell FC season =

CE Sabadell FC
2012–13 season
- Chairman: Joan Soteras
- Manager: Lluís Carreras
- Stadium: Nova Creu Alta
- Segunda División: League starts in August 2012
- Copa Del Rey: Entering into Second Round
Home colours	Away colours	Third colours

The 2012–13 CE Sabadell FC season is the 80th season in club history.

== Trophies balance ==
Category	Trophy	Started round	First match	Result	Last match
Friendly Trophy	Trofeu Vila de Palamós	Final	28 July 2012	Winners	28 July 2012
Friendly Trophy	Trofeu Ciutat de Gavà	Final	15 August 2012	Winners	15 August 2012
Competitive	Liga Adelante	—	18 August 2012		9 or 10 June 2013
Competitive	Copa del Rey	Second Qualifying Round	11 September 2012	Third Qualifying Round	17 October 2012
Competitive	Copa Catalunya	Fourth Qualifying Round	28 November 2012	Fourth Qualifying Round	28 November 2012

=== Competitive Balance ===
Biggest win
	Home				Away			
Liga Adelante	8 September 2012	Matchday 4	v. UD Almería	3 – 0	14 September 2011	Matchday 5	v. Real Madrid Castilla	2 – 3
Liga Adelante	22 September 2012	Matchday 6	v. Xerez CD	3 – 0	14 September 2011	Matchday 5	v. Real Madrid Castilla	2 – 3
Copa del Rey	11 September 2012	Second Qualifying Round	v. Hércules CF	2 – 0	None due to the elimination in the Third Qualifying Round			
Biggest loss
	Home				Away			
Liga Adelante	14 October 2012	Matchday 9	v. Hércules CF	1 – 2	2 September 2010	Matchday 3	v. FC Barcelona B	2 – 0
Liga Adelante	14 October 2012	Matchday 9	v. Hércules CF	1 – 2	6 October 2010	Matchday 8	v. Ponferradina	3 – 1
Copa del Rey	17 September 2012	Third Qualifying Round	v. Córdoba CF	0 – 1	None due to the elimination in the Third Qualifying Round			

== Summer transfers ==
=== In ===
(substituted on) In (9 players)
Player	From	Fee
(Spain) Abraham Paz	(Spain) Hércules	Free
(Spain) Víctor Espasandín	(Spain) Montañeros	Free
(Mexico) Aníbal Zurdo	(Spain) Guadalajara	Free
(Spain) Nauzet Pérez	(Spain) Mirandés	Free
(Spain) Manuel Gato	(Spain) Alcoyano	Free
(Spain) Juan Collantes	(Spain) Cartagena	Free
(Spain) Fernando Llorente	(Spain) Villarreal B	Free
(Spain) Dani Tortolero	(Spain) Girona	Free
(Morocco) Mohamed El Yaagoubi	(Spain) Girona	Free

=== Out ===
(substituted off) Out (9 players)
Player	New Team	Fee
(Spain) Samuel Baños	(Spain) Atlético Baleares	Free
(Spain) Ian Mackay	(Spain) Atlético Baleares	Free
(Spain) Aarón Bueno	(Spain) Gimnàstic de Tarragona	Free
(Spain) Manuel Redondo	(Spain) Xerez CD	Free
(France) Thierry Florian	(Spain) Cartagena	Free
(Spain) David Bermudo	(Spain) Badalona	Free
(Spain) Agustín Fernández	(Spain) Alavés	Free
(Spain) Albert Puigdollers	(Scotland) Cowdenbeath F.C.	Free
(Spain) Francesc Piera	(Spain) Alcoyano	Free

=== Loan in ===
(substituted on) Loan in (1 player)
Player	From
(Mexico) Ulises Dávila	(England) Chelsea

=== Loan end ===
(substituted off) Loan end (3 players)
Player	Returns to
(Spain) Álex Cruz	(Spain) Granada; Then, loan to (Spain) UCAM Murcia
(Spain) Ezequiel Calvente	(Spain) Real Betis; Then, loan to (Germany) Freiburg
(Uruguay) Adrián Luna	(Spain) RCD Espanyol; Then, loan to (Uruguay) Nacional

== Current squad ==
- Updated to 24 July 2012

Note: Flags indicate national team as defined under FIFA eligibility rules; some limited exceptions apply. Players may hold more than one non-FIFA nationality.

No.	Pos.	Nation	Player
1	GK	ESP	David de Navas
2	DF	ESP	Abraham Paz
3	DF	ESP	Víctor Espasandín
4	MF	ESP	Juanjo Ciércoles
5	MF	ESP	Antonio Hidalgo
6	MF	ESP	Héctor Simón
7	DF	ESP	Óscar Ramírez
8	MF	ESP	David Arteaga
9	FW	MEX	Aníbal Zurdo
10	MF	GEQ	Juvenal Edjogo
11	MF	ESP	Eneko Fernández
12	MF	ESP	Manuel Lanzarote

No.	Pos.	Nation	Player
13	GK	ESP	Nauzet Pérez
14	FW	ESP	Manuel Gato
15	DF	ESP	Pablo Ruiz
16	MF	MEX	Ulises Dávila (on loan from Chelsea)
17	DF	ESP	Toni Lao
19	MF	ESP	Juan Collantes
20	MF	ESP	Fernando Llorente
21	MF	ESP	Fito
22	DF	ESP	Dani Tortolero
23	DF	MAR	Mohamed El Yaagoubi
24	DF	ESP	Jesús Olmo
25	FW	MAR	Nabil Baha

=== Youth system ===
Note: Flags indicate national team as defined under FIFA eligibility rules; some limited exceptions apply. Players may hold more than one non-FIFA nationality.

No.	Pos.	Nation	Player
—	GK	ESP	Manuel Martín
26	MF	ESP	Eric Reverter
39	MF	ESP	Arnau Garcia

== Match stats ==
No.	Pos.	Player	Goal		Yellow card		(yellow card) (yellow-red card)		Red card	
No.	Pos.	Player	League	Cup	League	Cup	League	Cup	League	Cup
1	GK	(Spain) David de Navas								
2	DF	(Spain) Abraham Paz			2					
3	DF	(Spain) Víctor Espasandín	1		4					
4	MF	(Spain) Juanjo Ciércoles			4	1				
5	MF	(Spain) Antonio Hidalgo		1	4					
6	MF	(Spain) Hèctor Simón			2					
7	DF	(Spain) Òscar Ramírez			2					
8	MF	(Spain) David Arteaga								
9	FW	(Mexico) Aníbal Zurdo	6		1					
10	MF	(Equatorial Guinea) Juvenal Edjogo			2					
11	MF	(Spain) Eneko Fernández								
12	MF	(Spain) Manuel Lanzarote	1		2	1				
13	GK	(Spain) Nauzet Pérez			2					
14	FW	(Spain) Manuel Gato	1			1				
15	DF	(Spain) Pablo Ruiz				1				
16	MF	(Mexico) Ulises Dávila	4	2	1					
17	DF	(Spain) Toni Lao			1					
19	MF	(Spain) Juan José Collantes								
20	MF	(Spain) Fernando Llorente			1					
21	MF	(Spain) Fito Miranda			1					
22	DF	(Spain) Dani Tortolero	1		2					
23	DF	(Morocco) Mohamed El Yaagoubi	2		2		1			
24	DF	(Spain) Jesús Olmo								
25	FW	(Morocco) Nabil Baha								
26	FW	(Spain) Eric Reverter								

== Match results ==
=== Pre-season and friendly tournaments ===
21 July 2012	(Spain) CE Sabadell	1 – 2	UE Sant Andreu (Spain)	Sabadell (Barcelona)
18:30 CEST	Fito 75'	(Report)	Prats (p) 33'; Xavi Giménez 71'	Stadium: Sant Oleguer

25 July 2012	(Spain) UE Llagostera	0 – 0	CE Sabadell (Spain)	Palafrugell (Girona)
19:00 CEST		(report)		Stadium: Palafrugell; Attendance: 400

28 July 2012	(Spain) Palamós CF	0 – 3	CE Sabadell (Spain)	Palamós (Girona)
18:30 CEST		(report)	Llorente 25'; Pablo Ruiz 82'; Aníbal 90'	Stadium: Nou Municipal de Palamós; Attendance: 600

1 August 2012	(Spain) L'Escala FC	1 – 6	CE Sabadell (Spain)	L'Escala (Girona)
19:30 CEST		(report)	Eneko; Llorente; Fito; Hidalgo; Juvenal; Baha	Stadium: L'Escala

4 August 2012	(Spain) CE Sabadell	2 – 1	CE L'Hospitalet (Spain)	Sabadell (Barcelona)
18:30 CEST	Osado	(report)	Ulises 24'; Baha 61'	Stadium: Sant Oleguer

8 August 2012	(Spain) CE Sabadell	0 – 1	RCD Espanyol (Spain)	Sabadell (Barcelona)
22:00 CEST		(report); Live TV: Esport3	Víctor Álvarez	Stadium: Nova Creu Alta; Attendance: 2000

11 August 2012	(Spain) CF Reus Deportiu	2 – 1	CE Sabadell (Spain)	Reus (Tarragona)
20:30 CEST	Rubén Fonte 14'; Contreras	(report)	Collantes	Stadium: Camp Nou Municipal

15 August 2012	(Spain) CF Gavà	0 – 1	CE Sabadell (Spain)	Gavà (Barcelona)
19:30 CEST		(report)	Ulises Dávila 59'	Stadium: La Bòbila; Attendance: 200

=== Liga Adelante ===
Matchday	1	2	3	4	5	6	7	8	9	10	11	12	13	14	15	16	17	18	19	20	21	22	23	24	25	26	27	28	29	30	31	32	33	34	35	36	37	38	39	40	41	42
Against	GIR	VILL	FCB	ALM	RMD	XER	GUA	PON	HER	LPA	CÓR	SPO	SDH	REC	MIR	NUM	RMU	RAC	LUG	ELC	ALC	GIR	Vill	FCB	ALM	RMD	XER	GUA	PON	HER	LPA	CÓR	SPO	SDH	REC	MIR	NUM	RMU	RAC	LUG	ELC	ALC
Venue	A	H	A	H	A	H	H	A	H	A	H	A	H	A	H	A	H	A	H	A	H	H	A	H	A	H	A	H	A	H	A	H	A	H	A	H	A	H	A	H	A	H
Position	11	15	18	12	8	5	3	6	9	10	9																															
Goal Average (useful in case of tie)																																										

Win Draw Lost

		All							Home							Away						
		Pts	W	D	L	F	A	Dif.	Pts	W	D	L	F	A	Dif.	Pts	W	D	L	F	A	Dif.
9	CE Sabadell	15	4	3	4	14	12	2	11	3	2	1	10	4	6	4	1	1	3	4	8	-4

Liga Adelante Winners (also promoted)
Direct promotion to Liga BBVA (Liga Adelante Runners-up)
Liga BBVA promotion play-offs
Relegation to Segunda División B

18 August 2012 1	Girona FC	0 – 0	CE Sabadell	Girona (Catalonia)
19:00 CEST	José (yellow card) 73'	(report); Live TV: Esport3	Héctor Simón (yellow card) 34'; Moha (yellow card) 55'; Nauzet (yellow card) 63'; Toni Lao (yellow card) 68'; Abraham Paz (yellow card) 72'	Stadium: Estadi Montilivi; Attendance: 3200; Referee: (Balearic Islands) Sureda Cuenca

26 August 2012 2	CE Sabadell	0 – 0	Villarreal CF	Sabadell (Catalonia)
19:00 CEST	Llorente (yellow card) 26'; Hidalgo (yellow card) 86'	(report); Live TV: Esport3	Jaume (yellow card) 32'; Javi Venta (yellow card) 44'; Joan Oriol (yellow card) 65'; Mellberg (yellow card) 66'; Bruno (yellow card) 87'	Stadium: Nova Creu Alta; Attendance: 3300; Referee: (Basque Country (autonomous community)) Ricardo de Burgos Bengoetxea

2 September 2012 3	FC Barcelona B	2 – 0	CE Sabadell	Barcelona (Catalonia)
18:00 CEST	Kiko 15'; Rafinha 47'; Sergi Roberto (yellow card) 83'	(report); Live TV: Esport3	Abraham Paz (yellow card) 52'	Stadium: Mini Estadi; Attendance: 4535; Referee: (Basque Country (autonomous community)) Bikandi Garrido

8 September 2012 4	CE Sabadell	3 – 0	UD Almería	Sabadell (Catalonia)
18:00 CEST	Juanjo Ciércoles (yellow card) 10'; Aníbal Zurdo 25'; Aníbal Zurdo 34'; Aníbal Zurdo 51'; Fito (yellow card) 78'	(report); Live TV: Esport3	Ulloa (yellow card) 64'; Charles (yellow card) 67'	Stadium: Nova Creu Alta; Attendance: 2126; Referee: (Asturias) González Fuertes

16 September 2012 5	Real Madrid Castilla	2 – 3	CE Sabadell	Madrid (Madrid)
21:00 CEST	Juanfran 14'; Nacho (yellow card) 29'; Mosquera (yellow card) 29'; Jesé Rodríguez 35' (yellow card) 58'; Borja Garcia (yellow card) 89'	Summary	Dani Tortolero (yellow card) 22'; El Yaagoubi 49'; Zurdo 53', 57'; Ciércoles (yellow card) 83'; Víctor Espasandín (yellow card) 85'	Stadium: Estadio Alfredo Di Stefano; Attendance: 2,560; Referee: Mario Melero

22 September 2012 6	CE Sabadell	3 – 0	Xerez CD	Sabadell (Catalonia)
18:00 CEST	Ciércoles (yellow card) 26'; Dani Tortolero (yellow card) 31' (goal) 49'; Lanzarote (yellow card) 40'; El Yaagoubi 43'; Víctor Espasandín 56'; Antonio Hidalgo (yellow card) 67'; Óscar Ramírez (yellow card) 89'	Summary		Stadium: Nova Creu Alta; Attendance: 3,302; Referee: Daniel Ocón

29 September 2012 7	CE Sabadell	2 – 1	CD Guadalajara	Sabadell (Catalonia)
CEST				Stadium: Nova Creu Alta

7 October 2012 8	SD Ponferradina	3 – 1	CE Sabadell	Ponferrada (León)
CEST				Stadium: El Toralín

14 October 2012 9	CE Sabadell	1 – 2	Hércules CF	Sabadell (Catalonia)
CEST				Stadium: Nova Creu Alta

21 October 2012 10	UD Las Palmas	1 – 0	CE Sabadell	Las Palmas de Gran Canaria (Canary Islands)
19:00 CEST				Stadium: Estadio Gran Canaria

28 October 2012 11	CE Sabadell	1 – 1	Córdoba CF	Sabadell (Catalonia)
18:00 CEST				Stadium: Nova Creu Alta

4 November 2012 12	Sporting de Gijón	0 - 0	CE Sabadell	Gijón (Asturias)
20:00 CEST	Arnolin (yellow card) 9'; Iván Hernández (yellow card) 47'; Mandi (yellow card) 59'	Summary	Lanzarote (yellow card) 10'; Antonio Hidalgo (yellow card) 61'; Pablo Ruiz (yellow card) 74'; Abraham Paz (yellow card) 82'	Stadium: El Molinón; Attendance: 17,000; Referee: Antonio Israel Mariscal Sánchez

10 November 2012 13	CE Sabadell	1 - 0	SD Huesca	Sabadell (Catalonia)
20:00 CEST	Lanzarote 15' (pen.); Víctor Espasandín (yellow card) 20'	Summary	Llamas (red card) 14'; Antonio Núñez (yellow card) 53'; David Rivas (yellow card) 75'	Stadium: Nova Creu Alta; Attendance: 4,937; Referee: José Lesma

18 November 2012 14	Recreativo de Huelva	2 - 5	CE Sabadell	Huelva (Andalusia)
12:00 CEST	Jonatan Valle 20'; Fernando Vega (red card) 21'; Dimas (yellow card) 33'; Chuli 64'; Jordi Matamala (yellow card) 80'	Summary	Pablo Ruiz (yellow card) 15'; Lanzarote 23' (pen.); Juanjo Ciércoles (yellow card) 29'; Antonio Hidalgo 35'; Abraham Paz (yellow card) 42'; Ulises Dávila 69', 81'; Arteaga 74' (pen.); Antonio Lao (yellow card) 76'	Stadium: Nuevo Colombino; Attendance: 6,500; Referee: Jorge Valdés Aller

24 November 2012 15	CE Sabadell	v	CD Mirandés	Sabadell (Catalonia)
20:00 CEST				Stadium: Nova Creu Alta

2 December 2012 16	CD Numancia	v	CE Sabadell	Soria (Castile and León)
17:00 CEST				Stadium: Los Pajaritos

8 December 2012 17	CE Sabadell	v	Real Murcia	Sabadell (Catalonia)
20:00 CEST				Stadium: Nova Creu Alta

18 December 2012 18	Racing de Santander	v	CE Sabadell	Santander (Cantabria)
CEST				Stadium: El Sardinero

22 December 2012 19	CE Sabadell	v	CD Lugo	Sabadell (Catalonia)
CEST				Stadium: Nova Creu Alta

6 January 2012 20	Elche CF	v	CE Sabadell	Elche (Valencian Community)
CEST				Stadium: Martínez Valero

13 January 2012 21	CE Sabadell	v	AD Alcorcón	Sabadell (Catalonia)
CEST				Stadium: Nova Creu Alta

20 January 2012 22	CE Sabadell	v	Girona FC	Sabadell (Catalonia)
CEST				Stadium: Nova Creu Alta

27 January 2012 23	Villarreal CF	v	CE Sabadell	Vila-real (Valencian Community)
CEST				Stadium: El Madrigal

3 February 2012 24	CE Sabadell	v	FC Barcelona B	Sabadell (Catalonia)
CEST				Stadium: Nova Creu Alta

10 February 2012 25	UD Almería	v	CE Sabadell	Almería (Andalusia)
CEST				Stadium: Juegos Mediterráneos

17 February 2012 26	CE Sabadell	v	Real Madrid Castilla	Sabadell (Catalonia)
CEST				Stadium: Nova Creu Alta

24 February 2012 27	Xerez CD	v	CE Sabadell	Jerez (Andalusia)
CEST				Stadium: Chapín

3 March 2012 28	CD Guadalajara	v	CE Sabadell	Guadalajara (Castile-La Mancha)
CEST				Stadium: Pedro Escartín

10 March 2012 29	CE Sabadell	v	SD Ponferradina	Sabadell (Catalonia)
CEST				Stadium: Nova Creu Alta

17 March 2012 30	Hércules CF	v	CE Sabadell	Alicante (Valencian Community)
CEST				Stadium: José Rico Pérez

24 March 2012 31	CE Sabadell	v	UD Las Palmas	Sabadell (Catalonia)
CEST				Stadium: Nova Creu Alta

31 March 2012 32	Córdoba CF	v	CE Sabadell	Córdoba (Andalusia)
CEST				Stadium: Nuevo Arcángel

7 April 2012 33	CE Sabadell	v	Sporting de Gijón	Sabadell (Catalonia)
CEST				Stadium: Nova Creu Alta

14 April 2012 34	SD Huesca	v	CE Sabadell	Huesca (Aragon)
CEST				Stadium: El Alcoraz

21 April 2012 35	CE Sabadell	v	Recreativo de Huelva	Sabadell (Catalonia)
CEST				Stadium: Nova Creu Alta

28 April 2012 36	CD Mirandés	v	CE Sabadell	Miranda de Ebro (Castile and León)
CEST				Stadium: Anduva

5 May 2012 37	CE Sabadell	v	CD Numancia	Sabadell (Catalonia)
CEST				Stadium: Nova Creu Alta

12 May 2012 38	Real Murcia	v	CE Sabadell	Murcia (Murcia)
CEST				Stadium: Nueva Condomina

19 May 2012 39	CE Sabadell	v	Racing de Santander	Sabadell (Catalonia)
CEST				Stadium: Nova Creu Alta

26 May 2012 40	CD Lugo	v	CE Sabadell	Lugo (Galicia)
CEST				Stadium: Anxo Carro

2 June 2012 41	CE Sabadell	v	Elche CF	Sabadell (Catalonia)
CEST				Stadium: Nova Creu Alta

9 June 2012 42	AD Alcorcón	v	CE Sabadell	Alcorcón (Madrid)
CEST				Stadium: Santo Domingo

=== Copa del Rey ===
==== Second Qualifying Round ====
11 September 2012	CE Sabadell	2 – 0	Hércules CF	Sabadell (Catalunya)
12:00 CEST				Stadium: Nova Creu Alta

==== Third Qualifying Round ====
17 October 2012	CE Sabadell	0 – 1	Córdoba CF	Sabadell (Catalunya)
21:00 CEST				Stadium: Nova Creu Alta
