= Pepe Mora =

Spanish footballer

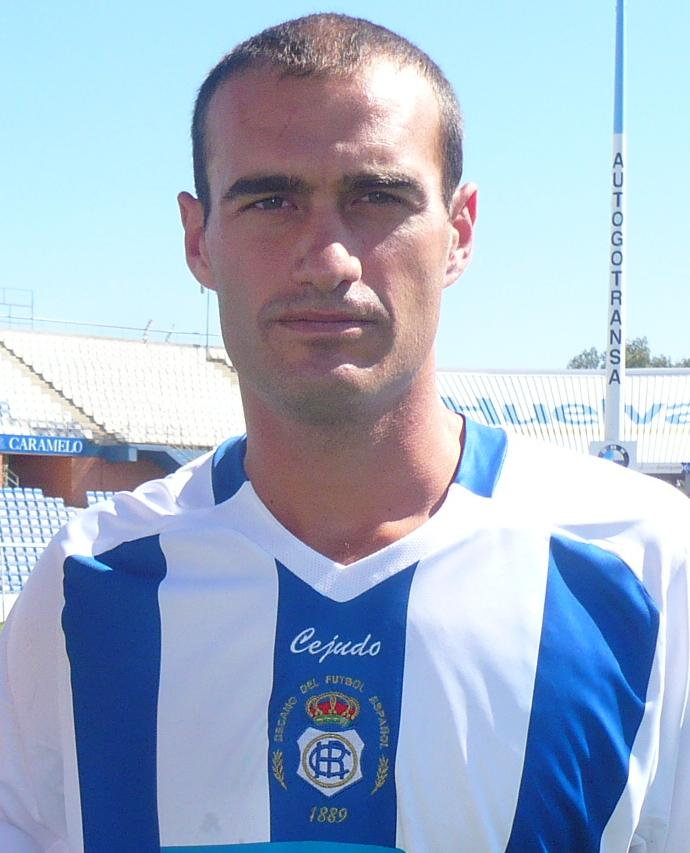
- Mora with Recreativo in 2009

Personal information
- Full name: José Francisco Mora Altava
- Date of birth: 11 June 1981 (age 45)
- Place of birth: Castellón, Spain
- Height: 1.87 m (6 ft 1 1/2 in)
- Position: Centre-back

Youth career
- Castellón

Senior career*
Years	Team	Apps	(Gls)
2000–2004	Castellón	109	(5)
2004–2005	Barcelona B	30	(1)
2005–2009	Castellón	114	(4)
2009–2011	Recreativo	58	(2)
2011–2013	Hércules	58	(1)
2013–2014	Alavés	14	(1)
2014–2015	Eldense	24	(3)
2015–2018	Borriol	83	(1)
Total		490	(18)
- * Club domestic league appearances and goals

José Francisco "Pepe" Mora Altava (born 11 June 1981 in Castellón de la Plana, Valencian Community) is a Spanish former professional footballer who played as a central defender.
