= Iván Gómez (footballer, born 1980) =

Spanish footballer

Personal information
- Full name: Iván Gómez Romero
- Date of birth: 2 February 1980 (age 46)
- Place of birth: Barcelona, Spain
- Height: 1.87 m (6 ft 2 in)
- Position: Goalkeeper

Youth career
- Espanyol

Senior career*
Years	Team	Apps	(Gls)
1998–2000	Espanyol B	4	(0)
2000–2001	Cornellà		
2001–2002	Gramenet B		
2002–2003	Alavés C		
2003–2005	Alavés B	41	(0)
2005–2006	Lanzarote	31	(0)
2006–2007	Burgos	36	(0)
2007–2008	Águilas	36	(0)
2008–2009	Girona	5	(0)
2009–2010	Mirandés	36	(0)
2011–2012	Sabadell	1	(0)
- * Club domestic league appearances and goals

Iván Gómez Romero (born 2 February 1980 in Barcelona, Catalonia) is a Spanish retired footballer who played as a goalkeeper.
