= Manuel Pavón =

Spanish footballer

Personal information
- Full name: Manuel Pavón Castro
- Date of birth: 27 February 1984 (age 42)
- Place of birth: Santa Fe, Spain
- Height: 1.87 m (6 ft 2 in)
- Position: Centre-back

Team information
- Current team: Don Benito

Youth career
- Santa Fe
- 1999–2000: Granada
- 2000–2001: Logroñés
- 2001–2002: Real Madrid
- 2002–2004: Numancia

Senior career*
Years	Team	Apps	(Gls)
2004–2006	Numancia B		
2006–2012	Numancia	111	(0)
2007	→ Granada (loan)	11	(1)
2012–2015	Lugo	99	(1)
2015–2016	Ponferradina	20	(1)
2016–2017	Fuenlabrada	23	(0)
2017–2020	Marbella	92	(3)
2020–2021	Orihuela	16	(1)
2021–	Don Benito	120	(4)
- * Club domestic league appearances and goals as of 15:16, 14 January 2026 (UTC)

Manuel Pavón Castro (born 27 February 1984) is a Spanish professional footballer who plays as a central defender for Tercera Federación club Don Benito.

Over eight seasons, he totalled 217 Segunda División matches for Numancia, Lugo and Ponferradina (two goals scored). In La Liga, he also appeared for the first club.

== Club career ==
Pavón was born in Santa Fe, Granada. After spells at a host of academies, he finished his development with CD Numancia. In early 2007, he was loaned to Segunda División B where his second youth club, Granada CF, competed, returning to the Nuevo Estadio Los Pajaritos in the 2007–08 season.

Pavón made his La Liga debut on 26 October 2008, playing the entire 2–1 home win against Racing de Santander. At the end of the campaign, however, the Soria side went back to Segunda División after only one year up.

Pavón continued competing in the second tier the following years, representing CD Lugo and SD Ponferradina. He scored his first goal as a professional on 27 September 2014 whilst at the service of the former team, contributing to a 4–3 home victory over CA Osasuna.
