= Juan José Collantes =

Spanish footballer

Personal information
- Full name: Juan José Collantes Guerrero
- Date of birth: 7 January 1983 (age 43)
- Place of birth: San Fernando, Spain
- Height: 1.70 m (5 ft 7 in)
- Position: Winger

Youth career
- 1999–2001: Villarreal

Senior career*
Years	Team	Apps	(Gls)
2001–2002	Onda	12	(0)
2002–2003	Palamós	29	(2)
2003–2005	Racing Santander B	52	(3)
2005–2009	Rayo Vallecano	134	(24)
2010–2011	Granada	55	(8)
2011–2012	Cartagena	39	(8)
2012–2015	Sabadell	102	(18)
2015–2016	Alcorcón	29	(0)
2016–2017	UCAM Murcia	34	(3)
2017–2019	Elche	30	(2)
2018–2019	→ UCAM Murcia (loan)	28	(3)
2019–2020	Roda	10	(0)
Total		554	(81)
- * Club domestic league appearances and goals

Juan José Collantes Guerrero (born 7 January 1983) is a Spanish former professional footballer who played as a right winger.

A Segunda División veteran, he played 275 matches in the competition while scoring 38 goals at the service of six clubs.

== Club career ==
Born in San Fernando, Cádiz, Andalusia, Collantes was a Villarreal CF youth graduate and made his senior debut with farm team CD Onda in the 2001–02 season, in the Segunda División B. He competed at that level the following six years, representing Palamós CF, Racing de Santander B and Rayo Vallecano, achieving promotion to Segunda División with the latter in 2008 while scoring a career-best 12 goals.

Collantes made his professional debut on 30 August 2008, playing the last 25 minutes of the 1–0 home win against Real Murcia CF after coming on for Míchel. He scored his first goal on 25 October, netting his team's last in a 4–1 rout of SD Eibar also at Campo de Fútbol de Vallecas.

In January 2010, having been rarely used during the campaign, Collantes joined division three side Granada CF, and was a regular starter in their two consecutive promotions. He would remain in that tier the following years, playing for FC Cartagena, CE Sabadell FC, AD Alcorcón and UCAM Murcia CF while suffering three relegations.

On 11 July 2017, Collantes agreed to a contract with Elche CF of the third division. After contributing regularly to the club's immediate promotion, he was deemed surplus to requirements by manager Pacheta and returned to UCAM on 31 August 2018.

Collantes joined Tercera División's CD Roda on 6 December 2019.
