= Adrián Luna =

Uruguayan footballer (born 1992)

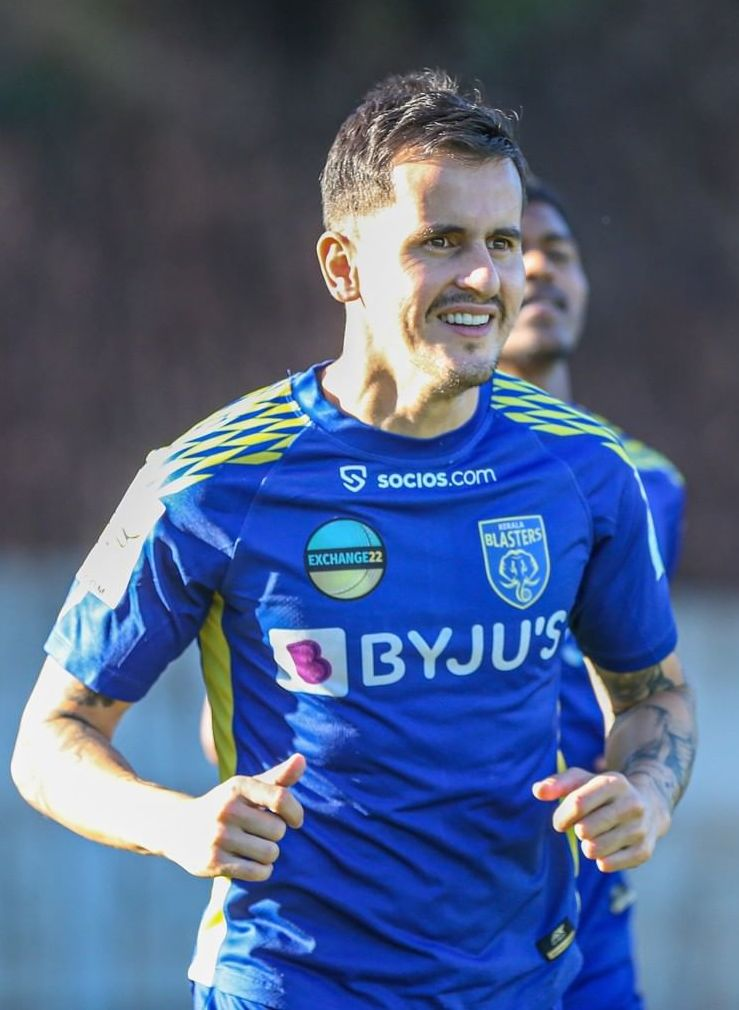
- Luna with Kerala Blasters in 2021

Personal information
- Full name: Adrián Nicolás Luna
- Date of birth: 12 April 1992 (age 34)
- Place of birth: Tacuarembó, Uruguay
- Height: 1.69 m (5 ft 7 in)
- Positions: Attacking midfielder; winger

Team information
- Current team: Kerala Blasters
- Number: 10

Youth career
- Progreso
- Montevideo Wanderers
- –2010: Defensor Sporting

Senior career*
Years	Team	Apps	(Gls)
2010–2011	Defensor Sporting	38	(4)
2011–2013	Espanyol	0	(0)
2011–2012	→ Gimnàstic (loan)	18	(2)
2012	→ Sabadell (loan)	12	(1)
2012–2013	→ Nacional (loan)	20	(3)
2013–2015	Defensor Sporting	51	(12)
2015–2019	Veracruz	89	(7)
2015–2016	→ Venados (loan)	23	(5)
2019–2021	Melbourne City	49	(8)
2021–	Kerala Blasters	78	(13)
2026	→ Persik Kediri (loan)	15	(2)

International career
2009	Uruguay U17	5	(2)
2011	Uruguay U20	14	(7)
- * Club domestic league appearances and goals as of 18 October 2026

Adrián Nicolás Luna Retamar (born 12 April 1992) is a Uruguayan professional footballer who plays as an attacking midfielder or winger for Indian Super League club Kerala Blasters.

Signed with the Kerala Blasters in 2021, Luna tops the club charts in terms of most assists, goal contributions, and also as the most represented foreign player in the Blasters' history. He was pivotal in the Blasters' road to final in 2021–22 campaign, in which the club finished as the Championship runner-ups.

== Club career ==
=== Youth and early career ===
Born in Tacuarembó, Luna began his youth career at academies of Progreso, Montevideo Wanderers and Defensor Sporting in Uruguay. He was eventually promoted to Defensor's U-19 and first team in 2010. Luna made his first team debut with Defensor Sporting, on 6 February 2010, against Nacional.

In the 2010–11 season Luna was a regular starter for Defensor. He played 41 matches for the Uruguayan club and scored 6 goals. On 23 May 2011, Luna signed a contract with La Liga club Espanyol, with a €1 million fee.

On 17 August 2011, Luna was loaned to Segunda División club Gimnàstic. However, in January 2012, Luna returned to Espanyol and signed a contract with CE Sabadell in a six-month loan in which he scored his only goal against Girona CF.

In August 2012, Luna was loaned to Club Nacional de Football, returning to his country. On 2 September 2013, his contract with Espanyol was rescinded. On 18 September 2013, he returned to Defensor and stayed at the club for two seasons.

=== C.D. Veracruz ===
In September 2015, Luna moved to Mexico, where he joined Liga MX club C.D. Veracruz on a two-year deal. On 4 September 2015, He was loaned out to Venados and represented the Mexican club for one season. He returned from loan in 2016, and went on to play for Veracruz in three seasons.

=== Melbourne City ===
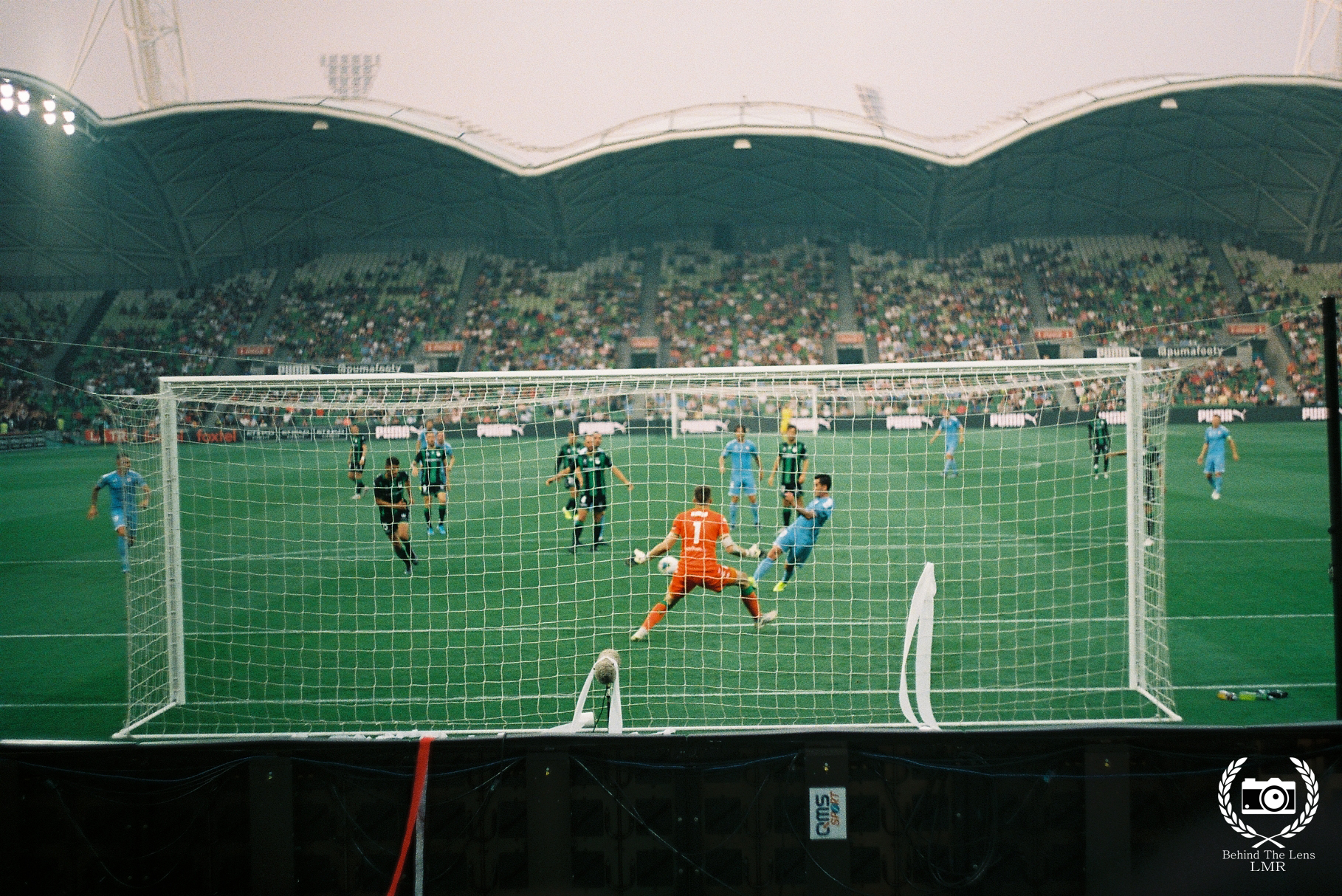
Luna scoring goal against Western United in 2020

On 19 July 2019, Luna signed for Australian club Melbourne City on a two-year deal. In July 2021, Luna left the club at the end of his contract, having scored 8 goals in 51 appearances.

=== Kerala Blasters (2021–Present) ===
==== 2021–22: Debut season ====
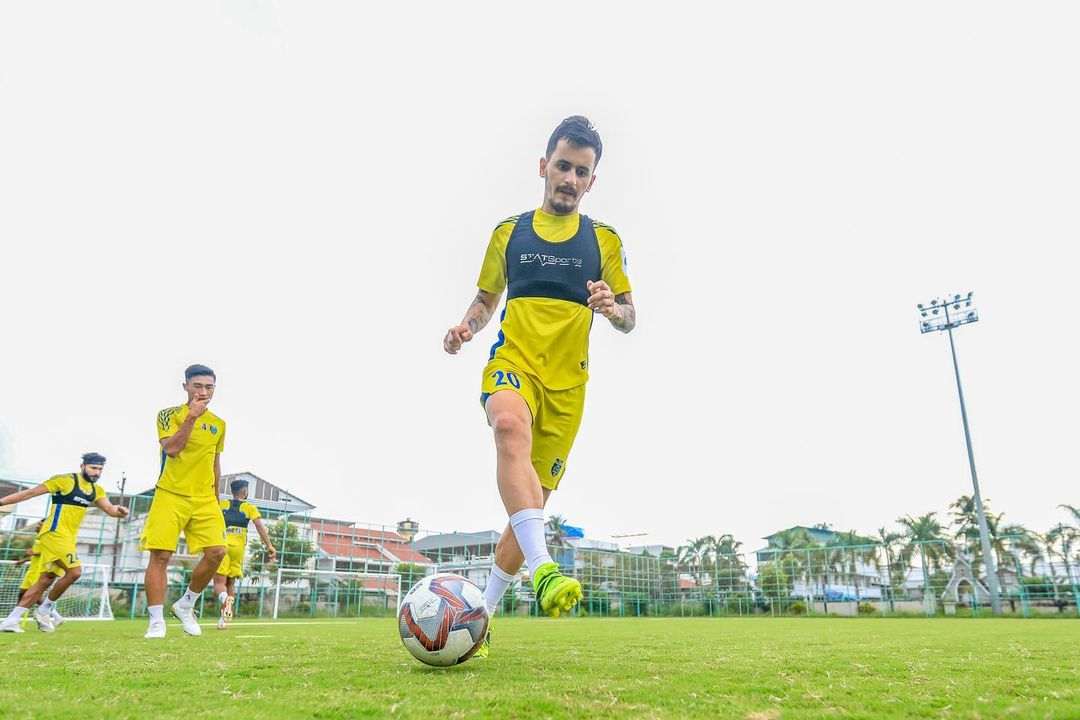
Luna in practice with Kerala Blasters in 2021

On 22 July 2021, Kerala Blasters announced that Luna had joined the Indian Super League club on a two-year deal. He made his debut for the club on 11 September 2021 against Indian Navy in the 2021 Durand Cup tournament. Luna scored from a penalty during the match and became the club's first ever goalscorer in Durand Cup. He made his first league appearance in the season opener against ATK Mohun Bagan FC on 19 November, which ended in a 4–2 defeat for Kerala Blasters. He was the assist provider of the second goal scored by Jorge Pereyra Díaz for the Blasters in the game.

On 5 December 2021, Luna helped the Blasters to register their first victory of the season against Odisha FC by providing two assists in a match which they won 2–1, and was the recipient of the man of the match award in the game. He was again awarded with the man of the match award in the next game against East Bengal on 12 December, which they drew 1–1. Disappointed by the match officials, Luna expressed his frustration on the referees in the post-match conference. He scored his first league goal for the Blasters' in a 0–3 victory over rivals Chennaiyin FC on 22 December, and was again awarded with the man of the match award.

On 2 January 2022, he scored his second goal in the match against FC Goa, where he scored a long-ranger from 30 yards out in a match that ended in a 2–2 draw. After the club captain Jessel Carnerio was declared injured, Luna spent much of the season as club captain in his absence. He played his first match as the captain against Odisha in the second phase of the season, where he assisted for two goals that helped Kerala Blasters to win the game 0–2 on 12 January 2022.

He scored a brace against ATK Mohun Bagan on 19 February, where he netted his first goal through a free-kick, and following from the edge of the penalty box. The match in a 2–2 draw at full-time. Luna scored another free-kick in the following match against Chennaiyin on 26 February, which ensured the Blasters a 3–0 victory. His goal in the second leg of the semi-final match against Jamshedpur FC on 15 March sealed the Blasters a place in the final, as the Blasters won 2–1 on aggregate score, and qualified for the finals for the third time in their history.

==== 2022–23: Contract extension ====
On 22 July 2022, Luna signed a two-year contract extension with Kerala Blasters till 2024. On 7 October 2022, he helped the Blasters in a 3–1 victory against East Bengal in the 2022–23 season opener by scoring the first goal of the game. He teared up after scoring the goal, pointed to the sky and dedicated it to his daughter Julieta, who died on 9 April 2022. "It was a special goal for me because everyone knows what I’m going through…me, my wife, family, son. This goal was for my little daughter,” Luna said after the match. He scored his second goal of the season on 12 November against FC Goa, where he scored the opening goal of the match as the Blasters ended up winning the game 3–1 at full-time.

On 4 December, Luna surpassed the club's record of most appearances by a foreign player by making his 31st appearance for the Blasters in a 1–0 win against Jamshedpur FC, where he provided the assist for Dimitrios Diamantakos. Luna netted his third goal of the season in the returning fixture against Jamshedpur on 3 January 2023, where he scored a 'perfectly set-up team-goal' as the Blasters won their eighth match of the season by the score of 3–1.

On 7 February, Luna scored a goal and provided an assist in their 2–1 derby match win against Chennaiyin and won the hero of the match award for his two-goal contribution in the match. On 29 March, the Blasters announced that Luna will not be part of their squad for the 2023 Indian Super Cup by stating that he requested to opt out from the tournament for personal reasons.

==== 2023–24: Club captaincy ====
After Jessel Carneiro joined Bengaluru in May 2023, Luna became the permanent club captain ahead of the 2023–24 season. He played his first match of the season against Gokulam Kerala FC in the 2023 Durand Cup tournament on 13 August 2023, in which he scored a goal in the 75th minute but the Blasters lost the match 3–4. On 20 September, the Blasters officially announced that Luna would captain the side for the upcoming season. Luna scored his first goal of the league season in the season opener against Bengaluru on 21 September, where he scored the second goal for the Blasters in the 69th minute of the match, as the Blasters secured a 2–1 win over the arch-rivals.

On 1 October, he scored the Blasters' only goal against Jamshedpur in a 1–0 victory at home. This was also Luna's 12th goal for the club in the Indian Super League and he also surpassed C. K. Vineeth's record to become the second top goalscorer for the club in the league. On 8 October, Luna made his 50th appearance for the club in a 2–1 loss against Mumbai City, and became the first foreign player in Kerala Blasters' history to make 50 appearances for the club.

During the match against Odisha FC on 27 October, Luna scored his 15th goal for the club and equalled Bartholomew Ogbeche's record to become the all-time top-scorer for the club across all competitions. In the match, he scored the second goal in the 84th minute and helped the Blasters in 2–1 victory. In the home against Hyderabad FC on 25 November, which also marked Luna's 50th Indian Super League appearance for the club, he assisted for Miloš Drinčić's goal and helped the Blasters in a 1–0 win.

On 14 December, various reports came that Luna had sustained a knee injury during the training session ahead of the match against Punjab FC potentially ruling him out for the rest of the season. On 16 December, the Blasters confirmed that Luna underwent a minor arthroscopic surgery for a chondral knee injury. After the recovery, he was back in the field for Kerala Blasters on 19 April 2024, in the Indian Super League playoff knockout match against Odisha FC. He came in as a substitute for Fedor Černych in the 81st minute, but the team eventually lost by the scoreline of 2–1 at 120 minutes.

==== 2024–25: Contract extension till 2027 ====
On 18 May 2024, the Blasters announced that Luna has signed a three-year contract extension with the club till 2027. His first match of the season came in the 2024 Durand Cup match against Mumbai City FC on 1 August, where he assisted Kwame Peprah in his first goal of the night, as the Blasters won the match with a record-breaking score of 8–0.

==== 2025–26: Loan to Persik Kediri ====
The 2025–26 Indian Super League season faced several delays due to sponsorship issues. Amid the continued uncertainty over ISL's future, Kerala Blasters decided to loan Luna to a foreign club. Following this, the club announced in January 2026 that a mutual arrangement has been made between Luna and the club. Later it was announced that he has joined the Indonesian top tier club Persik Kediri for the remainder of the season after only making 3 appearances for the Blasters in the 2025 AIFF Super Cup. He made 15 appearances for Persik, scoring 2 goals and providing 4 assists in the league.

==== 2026–2027: Return to Kerala Blasters ====
On 18 October 2026, Luna made his first appearance for Kerala Blasters since November 2025, in a 4–1 away defeat to Northeast United, where he also provided an assist to Momo Yansané's goal. Ahead of the match against Mumbai City on 25 October, manager Ashley Westwood announced that Vibin Mohanan would succeed Luna as the club captain for the 2026–27 season, citing his preference for an Indian captain as a mark of respect for Indian football.

== International career ==
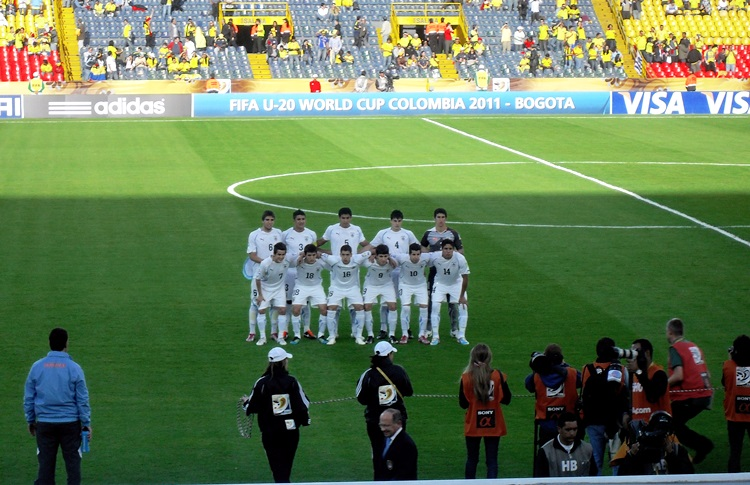
Luna (jersey number 7) lining up with teammates of Uruguay U-20 in August 2011

Luna has been capped by the Uruguay national under-17 football team for the 2009 FIFA U-17 World Cup. He has also represented Uruguay national under-20 football team for the 2011 South American Youth Championship and the 2011 FIFA U-20 World Cup. He has totally made 19 appearances across both the age groups.

== Style of play ==
Luna plays mainly as an attacking midfielder He has even been deployed in a deeper creative midfield position and on occasion, a box-to-box role or as a false 9.

== Personal life ==
On 4 July 2022, Luna revealed through social media that his six-year-old daughter Julieta died on 9 April 2022 after a battle with cystic fibrosis. In August 2022, Luna married his long-time girlfriend Mariana Hernandez.

== Career statistics ==
=== Club ===
As of matches played 1 September 2026

Appearances and goals by club, season and competition
Club	Season	League			National cup (Note: Includes Copa del Rey, Copa MX, Super Cup)		Continental		Other		Total	
Club	Season	Division	Apps	Goals	Apps	Goals	Apps	Goals	Apps	Goals	Apps	Goals
Defensor Sporting	2009–10	Primera División	13	0	—		—		—		13	0
Defensor Sporting	2010–11	Primera División	25	4	—		5 (Note: Appearance(s) in Copa Sudamericana)	2	—		30	6
Defensor Sporting	Total		38	4	—		5	2	—		43	6
Espanyol	2011–12	La Liga	0	0	0	0	—		—		0	0
Espanyol	2012–13	La Liga	0	0	0	0	—		—		0	0
Espanyol	Total		0	0	0	0	—		—		0	0
Gimnàstic Tarragona (loan)	2011–12	Segunda División	18	2	1	0	—		—		19	2
Sabadell (loan)	2011–12	Segunda División	12	1	0	0	—		—		12	1
Nacional	2012–13	Primera División	20	3	—		4 (Note: Two appearances and one goal in Copa Sudamericana, 2 appearances in Copa Libertadores)	1	—		24	4
Defensor Sporting	2013–14	Primera División	21	4	—		7 (Note: Appearance(s) in Copa Libertadores)	1	—		28	5
Defensor Sporting	2014–15	Primera División	28	7	—		1	0	—		29	7
Defensor Sporting	2015–16	Primera División	2	1	—		—		—		2	1
Defensor Sporting	Total		51	12	—		8	1	—		59	13
Venados (loan)	2015–16	Ascenso MX	23	5	3	0	—		—		26	5
Veracruz	2016–17	Liga MX	27	2	6	1	—		1 (Note: Appearance(s) in Supercopa MX)	0	34	3
Veracruz	2017–18	Liga MX	33	4	2	0	—		—		35	4
Veracruz	2018–19	Liga MX	29	1	4	0	—		—		33	1
Veracruz	Total		89	7	12	1	—		—		102	8
Melbourne City	2019–20	A-League	25	5	5	0	—		—		30	5
Melbourne City	2020–21	A-League	24	3	0	0	—		—		24	3
Melbourne City	Total		49	8	5	0	—		—		54	8
Kerala Blasters	2021–22	Indian Super League	23	6	—		—		2 (Note: Appearance(s) in Durand Cup)	1	25	7
Kerala Blasters	2022–23	Indian Super League	20	4	0	0	—		0	0	20	4
Kerala Blasters	2023–24	Indian Super League	10	3	0	0	—		2	1	12	4
Kerala Blasters	2024–25	Indian Super League	22	0	0	0	—		2	0	24	0
Kerala Blasters	2025–26	Indian Super League	0	0	3	0	—		—		3	0
Kerala Blasters	Total		75	13	3	0	—		6	2	84	15
Persik Kediri (loan)	2025–26	Super League	15	2	0	0	—		—		3	1
Career total			390	57	24	1	17	4	7	2	438	64

=== International ===
Appearances and goals by national team and year
National team	Year	Apps	Goals
Uruguay U17	2009	5	2
Uruguay U20	2011	14	7
Total		19	9

Scores and results list Uruguay's goal tally first, score column indicates score after each Luna goal.

List of youth international goals scored by Adrián Luna
No.	Date	Venue	Opponent	Score	Result	Competition	Ref.
1	29 October 2009	Ahmadu Bello Stadium, Kaduna, Nigeria	Algeria	1–0	2–0	2009 FIFA U-17 World Cup	
2	9 November 2009	Ahmadu Bello Stadium, Kaduna, Nigeria	Spain	1–0	3–3	2009 FIFA U-17 World Cup	
3	1 October 2010	Estadio Campeones Olímpicos, Florida, Uruguay	Chile	1–0	5–0	Friendly	
4	22 January 2011	Estadio Monumental Virgen de Chapi, Arequipa, Peru	Chile	3–0	4–0	2011 South American U-20 Championship	
5	31 January 2011	Estadio Monumental Virgen de Chapi, Arequipa, Peru	Colombia	1–0	1–0	2011 South American U-20 Championship	
6	6 February 2011	Estadio Monumental Virgen de Chapi, Arequipa, Peru	Chile	1–0	1–0	2011 South American U-20 Championship	
7	11 July 2011	Complejo Uruguay Celeste, Colonia Nicolich, Uruguay	Guatemala	2–0	7–0	Friendly	
8	11 July 2011	Complejo Uruguay Celeste, Colonia Nicolich, Uruguay	Guatemala	4–0	7–0	Friendly	
9	3 August 2011	Estadio Olímpico Pascual Guerrero, Cali, Colombia	New Zealand	1–1	1–1	2011 FIFA U-20 World Cup	

== Honours ==
Melbourne City

- A-League Premiership: 2020–21
- A-League Championship: 2021

Kerala Blasters

- Indian Super League runner-up: 2021–22

Individual

- Indian Super League Player of the Month: October 2023, November 2023
- Kerala Blasters Fans' Player of the Season: 2021–22, 2022–23

Sporting positions
Preceded by Jessel Carneiro	Kerala Blasters FC; Captain; 2023–	Succeeded by
