= Fran Piera =

Spanish footballer

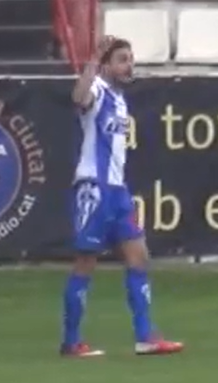
- Piera playing for Alcoyano in 2013

Personal information
- Full name: Francesc Piera Martínez
- Date of birth: 19 December 1987 (age 38)
- Place of birth: Barcelona, Spain
- Height: 1.77 m (5 ft 10 in)
- Position: Midfielder

Team information
- Current team: Masnou

Youth career
- Badalona

Senior career*
Years	Team	Apps	(Gls)
2005–2006	Alavés B	2	(0)
2006–2010	Sant Andreu	48	(2)
2008	→ Villarreal B (loan)	1	(0)
2010–2011	Santboià	33	(10)
2011	Puertollano	12	(3)
2011–2012	Sabadell	8	(0)
2012–2013	Alcoyano	31	(1)
2013–2014	Doxa	4	(0)
2015	La Roda	16	(2)
2015–2016	Cornellà	25	(1)
2016–2017	Prat	17	(1)
2017–2018	Terrassa	15	(4)
2018	Grama	11	(2)
2018–2019	Castelldefels	17	(2)
2019–2020	Sant Julià	21	(2)
2021–	Masnou	8	(0)
- * Club domestic league appearances and goals as of 15:01, 8 March 2022 (UTC)

Francesc 'Fran' Piera Martínez (born 19 December 1987 in Barcelona, Catalonia) is a Spanish footballer who plays for CD Masnou as a midfielder.
