= Aleix Domínguez =

Spanish footballer

Personal information
- Full name: Aleix Domínguez Hernández
- Date of birth: 28 April 1992 (age 34)
- Place of birth: Barberà del Vallès, Spain
- Position: Midfielder

Youth career
- 2000–2001: Barberà Andalucía
- 2001–2002: Damm
- 2002–2007: Espanyol
- 2007–2008: Badalona
- 2008–2010: Mercantil
- 2010–2011: Terrassa

Senior career*
Years	Team	Apps	(Gls)
2011–2015	Sabadell B	116	(21)
2012	Sabadell	1	(0)
2015–2017	Rubí		
- * Club domestic league appearances and goals as of 30 July 2015

Aleix Domínguez Hernández (born 28 April 1992) is a Spanish professional footballer who plays as a central midfielder.

== Club career ==
Born in Barberà del Vallès, Barcelona, Catalonia, Domínguez began playing football with local team CEF Barberà Andalucía, followed by spells with CF Damm, RCD Espanyol, CF Badalona and CE Mercantil, finished his formation with Terrassa FC. On 27 June 2011, he signed with CE Sabadell FC, being assigned to B-team.

On 7 January 2012, Domínguez played his first match as a professional, coming on as a late substitute in a 1–4 home loss against Real Valladolid, in the Segunda División championship. In July 2015, he moved to UE Rubí.
