= Fran Miranda =

Spanish footballer (born 1988)

Personal information
- Full name: Francisco Javier Miranda Mera
- Date of birth: 27 March 1988 (age 38)
- Place of birth: Badajoz, Spain
- Height: 1.90 m (6 ft 3 in)
- Position: Midfielder

Team information
- Current team: Badajoz

Youth career
- Badajoz
- 2005–2006: Cerro Reyes
- 2006–2007: Badajoz

Senior career*
Years	Team	Apps	(Gls)
2006	Cerro Reyes	3	(0)
2007	Badajoz	1	(2)
2007–2009	Mérida	32	(0)
2009–2011	Cerro Reyes	45	(0)
2011–2012	Alcoyano	37	(0)
2012–2013	Espanyol B	33	(0)
2013–2014	Melilla	35	(2)
2014–2015	Jaén	34	(1)
2015–2017	Alcoyano	69	(5)
2017–2018	Extremadura	32	(0)
2018–2020	Hércules	46	(1)
2020–2021	Gimnàstic	26	(0)
2021–2023	Alcoyano	68	(0)
2023–2024	UCAM	13	(0)
2024	Gandía	12	(0)
2024–	Badajoz	32	(0)
- * Club domestic league appearances and goals as of 17:03, 21 September 2025 (UTC)

Francisco Javier 'Fran' Miranda Mera (born 27 March 1988) is a Spanish footballer who plays as a midfielder for Tercera Federación club CD Badajoz.
