= Dani Tortolero =

Spanish footballer

Personal information
- Full name: Daniel Tortolero Núñez
- Date of birth: 6 September 1981 (age 45)
- Place of birth: Esplugues de Llobregat, Spain
- Height: 1.83 m (6 ft 0 in)
- Position: Centre-back

Youth career
- Cornellà
- 1992–1999: Barcelona

Senior career*
Years	Team	Apps	(Gls)
1998–2001	Barcelona C	43	(1)
1999–2003	Barcelona B	82	(3)
2002	Barcelona	0	(0)
2003–2004	Elche	27	(2)
2004–2005	Gimnàstic	23	(1)
2005–2006	Hércules	6	(0)
2006–2007	Salamanca	38	(4)
2007–2009	Gimnàstic	59	(5)
2009–2012	Girona	69	(7)
2012–2013	Sabadell	17	(1)
2013–2014	Doxa	11	(0)
Total		375	(24)

International career
1998	Spain U16	9	(0)
1998–1999	Spain U17	13	(1)
1999–2000	Spain U18	5	(2)
2001	Spain U20	1	(0)
2002–2003	Spain U21	10	(0)
- * Club domestic league appearances and goals

Daniel 'Dani' Tortolero Núñez (born 6 September 1981) is a Spanish former professional footballer who played as a central defender.

== Club career ==
Born in Esplugues de Llobregat, Barcelona, Catalonia, Tortolero was a FC Barcelona youth graduate. He only appeared however as a senior for the C and B teams – with the exception of two UEFA Champions League group-stage matches in the 2002–03 season, wins against Club Brugge KV (1–0, away) and Galatasaray SK (3–1, home)– being released in 2003. From that year until 2013 he competed in the Segunda División, playing 239 games and scoring 20 goals for Elche CF, Gimnàstic de Tarragona (two spells), Hércules CF, UD Salamanca, Girona FC and CE Sabadell FC.

In the summer of 2013, aged 32, Tortolero moved abroad for the first time, joining Doxa Katokopias FC in the Cypriot First Division. In July 2015, after one year of inactivity, he was supposed to sign for Romanian club FC Rapid București on a three-year contract, but the deal eventually fell through.

== International career ==
Tortolero earned caps for Spain at under-21 level.

== Career statistics ==
Club	Season	League			Cup		Other		Total	
Club	Season	Division	Apps	Goals	Apps	Goals	Apps	Goals	Apps	Goals
Barcelona B	1999–2000	Segunda División B	2	0	—		—		2	0
Barcelona B	2000–01	Segunda División B	12	0	—		—		12	0
Barcelona B	2001–02	Segunda División B	35	1	—		6 (Note: Appearances in Segunda División B play-offs)	0	41	1
Barcelona B	2002–03	Segunda División B	23	1	—		4	1	27	2
Barcelona B	Total		72	2	—		10	1	82	3
Barcelona	2002–03	La Liga	0	0	0	0	2 (Note: Appearances in UEFA Champions League)	0	2	0
Elche	2003–04	Segunda División	27	2	0	0	—		27	2
Gimnàstic	2004–05	Segunda División	23	1	2	0	—		25	1
Hércules	2005–06	Segunda División	6	0	0	0	—		6	0
Salamanca	2006–07	Segunda División	38	4	1	0	—		39	4
Gimnàstic	2007–08	Segunda División	27	3	1	0	—		28	3
Gimnàstic	2008–09	Segunda División	32	2	1	0	—		33	2
Gimnàstic	Total		59	5	2	0	—		61	5
Girona	2009–10	Segunda División	23	3	2	1	—		25	4
Girona	2010–11	Segunda División	18	1	0	0	—		18	1
Girona	2011–12	Segunda División	28	3	0	0	—		28	3
Girona	Total		69	7	2	1	—		71	8
Sabadell	2012–13	Segunda División	17	1	1	0	—		18	1
Doxa	2013–14	Cypriot First Division	11	0	5	0	—		16	0
Rapid București	2015–16	Liga II	0	0	0	0	—		0	0
Career total			322	22	13	1	12	1	347	24
