= Ian Mackay (footballer) =

Spanish footballer (born 1986)

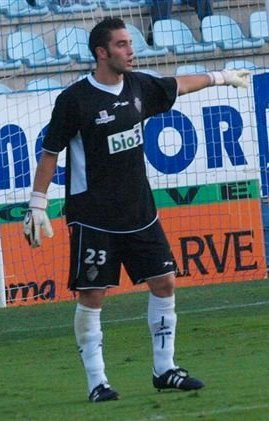
- Mackay with Ponferradina in 2011

Personal information
- Full name: Ian Mackay Abad
- Date of birth: 14 July 1986 (age 40)
- Place of birth: A Coruña, Spain
- Height: 1.81 m (5 ft 11 in)
- Position: Goalkeeper

Team information
- Current team: Intercity
- Number: 1

Youth career
- Ural CF
- 2003–2005: Deportivo La Coruña

Senior career*
Years	Team	Apps	(Gls)
2005–2007	Deportivo B	32	(0)
2006	→ Ceuta (loan)	3	(0)
2007	→ Universidad Oviedo (loan)	8	(0)
2007–2008	Vecindario	5	(0)
2008–2009	Ciudad Santiago	49	(0)
2009–2011	Ponferradina	48	(0)
2011–2012	Sabadell	4	(0)
2012–2013	Atlético Baleares	20	(0)
2013–2014	Boiro	24	(0)
2014–2018	Racing Ferrol	130	(0)
2018–2019	Murcia	36	(0)
2019–2021	Sabadell	69	(0)
2021–2024	Deportivo La Coruña	74	(0)
2024–2025	Eldense	27	(0)
2025–	Intercity	37	(0)
- * Club domestic league appearances and goals as of 16:32, 23 September 2026 (UTC)

Ian Mackay Abad (born 14 July 1986) is a Spanish professional footballer who plays as a goalkeeper for Segunda Federación club Intercity.

== Club career ==
Born in A Coruña, Mackay emerged through local Deportivo de La Coruña youth ranks, but never managed any competitive appearances, only occasionally being involved in training. In his first year as a professional he was loaned to Segunda División B sides, AD Ceuta and AD Universidad de Oviedo, before being released in 2007 and joining another team in that tier, UD Vecindario.

In January 2008, Mackay returned to Galicia, joining lowly SD Ciudad de Santiago and helping to win promotion to the third division, with the club in a severe financial crisis. In the following summer he moved to SD Ponferradina, still in division three. He achieved promotion to Segunda División in his first season, and played his first match in the competition on 28 August 2010 by starting in a 0–0 home draw against SD Huesca.

Mackay made 23 appearances in his debut campaign, but Ponfe were immediately relegated. On 18 July 2011, he joined CE Sabadell FC also of the second tier, serving as a backup to David de Navas during his only season.

In August 2012, Mackay moved to CD Atlético Baleares in the third division. In October 2013, he joined Tercera División's CD Boiro, but signed for Racing de Ferrol in April of the following year when their three goalkeepers were injured.

Mackay totalled 140 games for Ferrol, and after their relegation in 2017–18 he stayed in the third tier, joining Real Murcia CF. He returned to Sabadell in July 2019, and was a starter in the club's promotion to the second division.

On 11 June 2021, Mackay returned to Deportivo, now as a first-team player. On 23 January 2024, he signed for second-tier newcomers CD Eldense. He started in seven of the last eight fixtures while conceding six goals, and the latter side managed to retain their status.

Mackay could not help prevent relegation in the following season, however. On 1 July 2025, the 39-year-old moved down to Segunda Federación on a contract at CF Intercity.

== International career ==
In February 2007, it was reported that Mackay was being tracked for the Scotland national team by manager Alex McLeish.

== Personal life ==
Mackay was born to a Spanish mother and a Scottish father, oil worker John Cameron Mackay from Inverness, and had four older half-sisters in Aberdeen; due to living his whole life in Spain, he did not speak English. He was a fan of Celtic, and idolised Henrik Larsson.
