= Fernando Llorente (footballer, born 1990) =

Spanish footballer

Personal information
- Full name: Fernando Llorente Mañas
- Date of birth: 18 September 1990 (age 36)
- Place of birth: Segovia, Spain
- Height: 1.78 m (5 ft 10 in)
- Position: Midfielder

Team information
- Current team: Gimnástica Segoviana
- Number: 14

Youth career
- 2007–2009: Atlético Madrid

Senior career*
Years	Team	Apps	(Gls)
2009–2011	Villarreal C	33	(1)
2009–2012	Villarreal B	38	(1)
2012–2014	Sabadell	29	(2)
2015	Burgos	16	(2)
2015–2016	Poli Timișoara	31	(1)
2016	Belenenses	0	(0)
2016–2017	Poli Timișoara	13	(0)
2017	Cartagena	16	(7)
2017–2018	Murcia	13	(0)
2018	Mirandés	11	(0)
2018–2019	Recreativo	33	(5)
2019–2020	Rayo Majadahonda	24	(3)
2020–2021	Salamanca	26	(7)
2021–2022	S.S. Reyes	36	(1)
2022–	Gimnástica Segoviana	126	(21)
- * Club domestic league appearances and goals as of 17:13, 5 August 2026 (UTC)

Fernando Llorente Mañas (born 18 September 1990) is a Spanish professional footballer who plays as a central midfielder for Gimnástica Segoviana.

== Club career ==
Born in Segovia, Castile and León, Llorente began his career in the youth ranks of Atlético Madrid before transferring to Villarreal CF, where he made his senior debut in their third team. His professional match with the latter club's reserves took place on 5 September 2009, when he came on as a late substitute for Joan Tomàs in a 3–1 away loss against Córdoba CF in the Segunda División, his only appearance of the season. He became a regular in 2011–12, and scored his first goal on 2 December 2011 as consolation in a 3–1 defeat at UD Las Palmas in the same competition.

On 9 July 2012, Llorente signed a two-year deal with second-division side CE Sabadell FC. On its expiration, he spent five months with Burgos CF of Segunda División B.

Llorente moved abroad for the first time on 18 June 2015, signing a two-year contract at Romanian Liga I club ACS Poli Timișoara. A year later he switched countries again to join C.F. Os Belenenses in the Portuguese Primeira Liga, but an injury-stricken pre-season and competition in midfield caused him to be given permission to leave just two months later, and he returned to Poli in September 2016.

In January 2017, Llorente returned to his country and its third tier, joining FC Cartagena. In the following years, he represented Real Murcia CF, CD Mirandés, Recreativo de Huelva, CF Rayo Majadahonda, Salamanca CF UDS and UD San Sebastián de los Reyes in the same league.
