= Diego Bermúdez (footballer) =

Spanish footballer

Personal information
- Full name: Diego Andrés Bermúdez Penabad
- Date of birth: 19 June 1982 (age 44)
- Place of birth: As Pontes, Spain
- Height: 1.85 m (6 ft 1 in)
- Position: Left back

Youth career
- Endesa As Pontes
- Celta

Senior career*
Years	Team	Apps	(Gls)
2001–2002	Viveiro		
2002–2003	Villalbés		
2003–2004	Compostela	3	(0)
2004–2005	Arteixo	16	(0)
2005–2006	Móstoles	31	(0)
2006–2007	Osasuna B	11	(0)
2007–2009	Leganés	54	(1)
2009–2012	Alcorcón	44	(1)
2012–2013	Cádiz	13	(0)
- * Club domestic league appearances and goals

Diego Andrés Bermúdez Penabad (born 19 June 1982 in As Pontes de García Rodríguez, A Coruña, Galicia) is a Spanish retired footballer who played as a left back.
