= Pablo Ruiz (footballer, born 1981) =

Spanish footballer

Personal information
- Full name: Pablo Ruiz Barrero
- Date of birth: 25 February 1981 (age 45)
- Place of birth: Seville, Spain
- Height: 1.86 m (6 ft 1 in)
- Position: Centre-back

Youth career
- Sevilla

Senior career*
Years	Team	Apps	(Gls)
2000–2005	Sevilla B	110	(5)
2004–2009	Sevilla	9	(0)
2006–2007	→ Murcia (loan)	25	(0)
2007–2009	→ Córdoba (loan)	49	(3)
2009–2011	Cartagena	38	(1)
2011–2014	Sabadell	36	(0)
Total		267	(9)
- * Club domestic league appearances and goals

Pablo Ruiz Barrero (born 25 February 1981 in Seville, Andalusia) is a Spanish former professional footballer who played as a central defender.
