= Óscar Ramírez (footballer, born 1984) =

Spanish footballer

Personal information
- Full name: Óscar Ramírez Martín
- Date of birth: 1 March 1984 (age 42)
- Place of birth: La Bisbal, Spain
- Height: 1.83 m (6 ft 0 in)
- Position: Right-back

Youth career
- Palafrugell

Senior career*
Years	Team	Apps	(Gls)
2003–2004	Palafrugell		
2004–2006	Figueres	29	(1)
2006–2007	Badalona	35	(0)
2007–2009	Sevilla B	45	(0)
2009–2011	Badalona	73	(2)
2011–2013	Sabadell	78	(0)
2013–2015	Ponferradina	58	(0)
2015–2016	Huesca	21	(0)
2016–2019	Cartagena	102	(1)
2019–2020	Recreativo	12	(0)
Total		453	(4)
- * Club domestic league appearances and goals

Óscar Ramírez Martín (born 1 March 1984 in La Bisbal d'Empordà, Girona, Catalonia) is a Spanish former professional footballer who played as a right-back.
