= Antonio Lao =

Spanish footballer

Toni Lao
Personal information
- Full name: Antonio Lao Doña
- Date of birth: 17 January 1984 (age 42)
- Place of birth: Barcelona, Spain
- Height: 1.78 m (5 ft 10 in)
- Position: Midfielder

Youth career
- 1990–1992: Bellvitge
- 1992–1995: Vallespir
- 1995–2000: Barcelona
- 2000–2002: Ferrán Martorell
- 2002–2003: Espanyol

Senior career*
Years	Team	Apps	(Gls)
2002	Caprabo	1	(0)
2003–2008	Espanyol B	158	(0)
2008–2010	Gramenet	74	(0)
2010–2014	Sabadell	133	(3)
2014–2018	Badalona	129	(7)
2018–2019	Sant Julià	26	(0)
2019–2021	Inter d'Escaldes	38	(0)
- * Club domestic league appearances and goals

Antonio 'Toni' Lao Doña (born 17 January 1984) is a Spanish former footballer who played as a central midfielder.
