= David Arteaga =

Spanish footballer

Personal information
- Full name: David Pérez Arteaga
- Date of birth: 1 December 1981 (age 44)
- Place of birth: Seville, Spain
- Height: 1.67 m (5 ft 6 in)
- Position: Midfielder

Youth career
- Sevilla

Senior career*
Years	Team	Apps	(Gls)
2000–2002	Sevilla B	66	(16)
2001–2004	Sevilla	5	(0)
2003–2004	→ Recreativo (loan)	14	(0)
2004–2005	Atlético Madrid B	2	(0)
2005	Algeciras	13	(0)
2005–2006	Écija	32	(6)
2006–2011	Córdoba	160	(29)
2011–2014	Sabadell	50	(4)
Total		342	(55)
- * Club domestic league appearances and goals

David Pérez Arteaga (born 1 December 1981) is a Spanish former professional footballer who played as a central midfielder.

== Club career ==
Arteaga was born in Seville, Andalusia. Having spent most of his career with clubs in his native region, mostly in the Segunda División, he made four La Liga appearances for Sevilla FC in two separate seasons in the early 2000s.

Arteaga also represented Recreativo de Huelva, Atlético Madrid B, Algeciras CF, Écija Balompié, Córdoba CF and CE Sabadell FC, alternating between the second tier and Segunda División B. He retired at the end of the 2013–14 campaign whilst at the service of the last team, aged 32.
