= Héctor Simón =

Spanish footballer

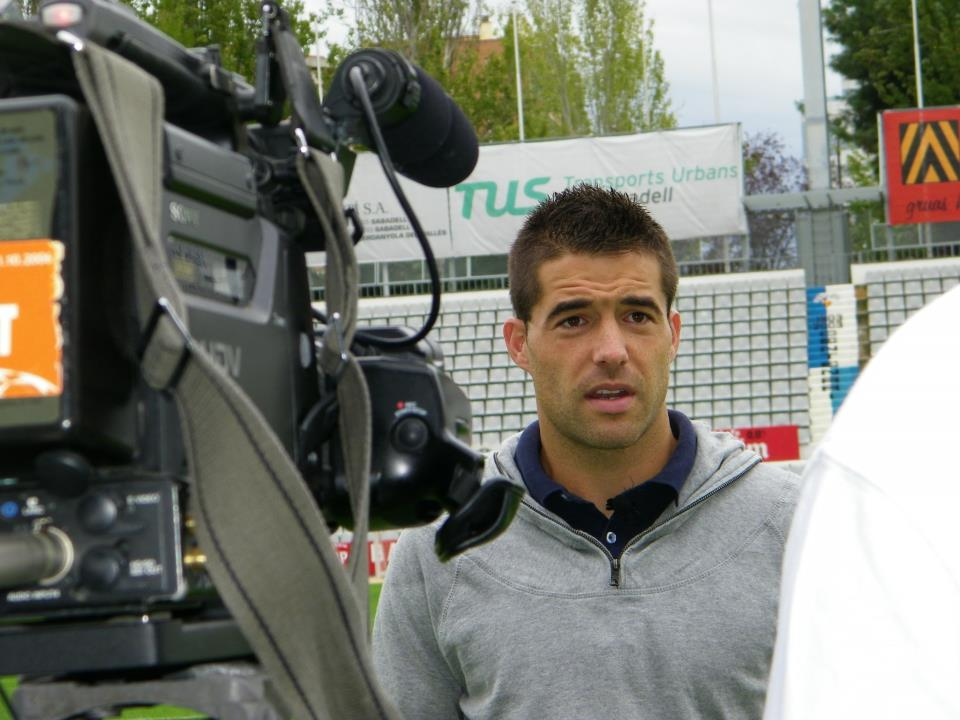

Personal information
- Full name: Héctor Simón Escudero
- Date of birth: 13 March 1984 (age 42)
- Place of birth: Llançà, Spain
- Height: 1.75 m (5 ft 9 in)
- Position: Attacking midfielder

Team information
- Current team: Girona (youth manager)

Youth career
- 1994–1998: Peralada
- 1998–1999: Barcelona
- 1999–2001: Figueres
- 2002–2003: Espanyol

Senior career*
| Years | Team | Apps | (Gls) |
| 2000–2002 | Figueres | 28 | (11) |
| 2002–2008 | Espanyol B | 84 | (14) |
| 2003–2004 | Espanyol | 8 | (0) |
| 2005–2006 | → Racing Ferrol (loan) | 13 | (1) |
| 2008–2010 | Girona | 4 | (0) |
| 2009 | → Cultural Leonesa (loan) | 14 | (0) |
| 2010 | Benidorm | 7 | (0) |
| 2010–2011 | Castellón | 34 | (4) |
| 2011–2013 | Sabadell | 40 | (1) |
| 2013–2014 | Oviedo | 48 | (2) |
| 2014–2021 | Olot | 201 | (29) |
| Total | | 477 | (61) |

International career
| 2003 | Spain U20 | 1 | (0) |

Managerial career
- 2021–2022: Peralada
- 2022–2023: Hospitalet
- 2023–: Girona (youth)
- * Club domestic league appearances and goals

Héctor Simón Escudero (born 13 March 1984) is a Spanish professional football manager and former player who played as an attacking midfielder. He is the current manager of Girona FC's youth categories.

== Club career ==
Born in Llançà, Girona, Catalonia, after starting out at local UE Figueres, Simón finished his formation also in his native region, at RCD Espanyol. In the 2003–04 season he made his first-team debuts, playing eight times – mainly as a late substitute – as the club could barely avoid relegation, finishing 16th; his first La Liga match came on 30 August 2003, when he played the last minute of a 1–1 home draw against Real Sociedad.

Simón then had an unassuming loan spell at Racing de Ferrol, appearing sparingly in an eventual relegation from the second division and being finally released by Espanyol in the 2008 summer without any further main squad appearances. He subsequently signed with neighbouring Girona FC in the second level, featuring rarely for the club over the course of two seasons.

In January 2009, Simón served a five-month loan in division three, with Cultural y Deportiva Leonesa. In the same month of the following year he was released by Girona, signing for Benidorm CF; he played the entire 2010–11 with yet another side in the category, CD Castellón.
