= Manuel Redondo =

Spanish professional footballer (born 1985)

Personal information
- Full name: Manuel Redondo García
- Date of birth: 11 January 1985 (age 41)
- Place of birth: Seville, Spain
- Height: 1.83 m (6 ft 0 in)
- Position: Left-back

Youth career
- 1997–2004: Sevilla

Senior career*
Years	Team	Apps	(Gls)
2004–2005	Sevilla C		
2005–2011	Sevilla B	109	(7)
2010–2011	→ Ponferradina (loan)	21	(0)
2011–2012	Sabadell	20	(0)
2012–2013	Xerez	22	(1)
2013–2014	Buriram United	0	(0)
2015	Oviedo	12	(2)
2015–2018	Doxa	78	(2)
2018–2019	Coria	19	(1)
Total		281	(13)
- * Club domestic league appearances and goals

Manuel Redondo García (born 11 January 1985 in Seville, Andalusia) is a Spanish former professional footballer who played as a left-back.

== Career statistics ==
Club	Season	League			Cup		Continental		Total	
Club	Season	Division	Apps	Goals	Apps	Goals	Apps	Goals	Apps	Goals
Sevilla B	2004–05	Segunda División B	1	0	—		1 (Note: Appearances in Promotion Play-offs)	0	2	0
Sevilla B	2005–06	Segunda División B	30	2	—		4	0	34	2
Sevilla B	2006–07	Segunda División B	36	3	—		1	0	37	3
Sevilla B	2007–08	Segunda División	2	0	—		—		2	0
Sevilla B	2008–09	Segunda División	9	2	—		—		9	2
Sevilla B	2008–09	Segunda División B	31	0	—		—		31	0
Sevilla B	Total		109	7	—		6	0	115	7
Sevilla	2009–10	La Liga	0	0	1	0	—		1	0
Ponferradina (loan)	2010–11	Segunda División	21	0	2	0	—		23	0
Sabadell	2011–12	Segunda División	20	0	0	0	—		20	0
Xerez	2012–13	Segunda División	22	1	1	0	—		23	1
Buriram United	2013	Thai Premier League	0	0	0	0	0	0	0	0
Oviedo	2014–15	Segunda División B	12	2	—		3	0	15	2
Doxa	2015–16	Cypriot First Division	23	0	0	0	—		23	0
Doxa	2016–17	Cypriot First Division	30	1	3	0	—		33	1
Doxa	2017–18	Cypriot First Division	25	1	3	0	—		28	1
Doxa	Total		78	2	6	0	—		84	2
Career total			262	17	10	0	9	0	281	17

== Honours ==
Sevilla B

- Segunda División B: 2006–07

Sevilla

- Copa del Rey: 2009–10

Oviedo

- Segunda División B: 2014–15
