= Aníbal Zurdo =

Mexican footballer (born 1982)

Personal information
- Full name: Aníbal Zurdo Rodríguez
- Date of birth: 3 December 1982 (age 43)
- Place of birth: Villahermosa, Mexico
- Height: 1.88 m (6 ft 2 in)
- Position: Striker

Youth career
- 2001–2002: Atlético Madrid

Senior career*
Years	Team	Apps	(Gls)
2002–2003	Guadalajara		
2003–2004	Móstoles	21	(5)
2004–2006	Valencia B	15	(7)
2006–2007	Benidorm	19	(3)
2007–2008	Lanzarote	32	(9)
2008–2010	Leganés	65	(20)
2010–2012	Guadalajara	77	(18)
2012–2014	Sabadell	74	(28)
2014–2016	Cruz Azul	3	(0)
2015	→ Sabadell (loan)	20	(6)
2015	→ Veracruz (loan)	10	(1)
2016	Gimnàstic	15	(2)
2016	Pune City	12	(5)
2017–2018	Atlético Pinto	36	(7)
Total		399	(111)
- * Club domestic league appearances and goals

Aníbal Zurdo Rodríguez (born 3 December 1982) is a Mexican former professional footballer who played as a striker. He also held Spanish nationality.
