= Moha El Yaagoubi =

Moroccan footballer

Personal information
- Full name: Mohammed El Yaagoubi Youbi
- Date of birth: 12 September 1977 (age 49)
- Place of birth: Taourirt, Morocco
- Height: 1.70 m (5 ft 7 in)
- Position: Midfielder

Youth career
- Santboià

Senior career*
| Years | Team | Apps | (Gls) |
| 1996–1997 | Santboià | | |
| 1997–1999 | Barcelona C | 73 | (11) |
| 1997–2000 | Barcelona B | 38 | (5) |
| 2000–2006 | Osasuna | 121 | (10) |
| 2001 | → Levante (loan) | 19 | (2) |
| 2001–2002 | → Elche (loan) | 39 | (4) |
| 2006–2008 | Espanyol | 28 | (1) |
| 2008–2009 | Real Sociedad | 34 | (1) |
| 2009–2012 | Girona | 101 | (8) |
| 2012–2014 | Sabadell | 41 | (6) |
| Total | | 494 | (48) |

International career
| 2003–2007 | Morocco | 37 | (1) |
- * Club domestic league appearances and goals

Mohammed El Yaagoubi Youbi (Arabic: محمد اليعقوبي; born 12 September 1977), known as Moha, is a Moroccan former footballer who played as a left midfielder.

Due to the many years spent in Spain – his entire professional career, which spanned nearly 15 years – he also held a passport from that country. He amassed La Liga totals of 149 games and 11 goals over the course of seven seasons, representing in the competition Osasuna and Espanyol.

== Club career ==
Born in Taourirt, Morocco, Moha moved to Spain in the early 1980s. He started his club career with FC Barcelona, representing however only its C and B-teams. He spent the bulk of his career at CA Osasuna, first playing two matches in the 2000–01 season in La Liga.

After two Segunda División loans, with Levante UD and Elche CF, Moha returned to the Navarrese, going on to become a crucial offensive element although never an undisputed starter. On 11 April 2004 he scored in a 3–0 away win against Real Madrid and, in 2005–06, as Osasuna finished a best-ever fourth, he netted twice in 27 games.

Moha then returned to Catalonia as he joined RCD Espanyol for €400.000 going on to feature sparingly, especially in his second year, although he did contribute with eight matches to the club's runner-up campaign in the UEFA Cup. Released in June 2008, he joined Real Sociedad on a free transfer.

After not being able to help Real Sociedad return to the top flight, Moha moved to another side in that tier, Girona FC.

== International career ==
Moha made his international debut for Morocco on 12 March 2003 against Senegal, in a friendly, being part of the squad at the 2004 African Cup of Nations for a final runner-up position (all games played, although none complete).

== Honours ==
=== Club ===
Espanyol

- UEFA Cup: Runner-up 2006–07

=== Country ===
Morocco

- Africa Cup of Nations: Runner-up 2004
