= Aarón Bueno =

Spanish footballer (born 1983)

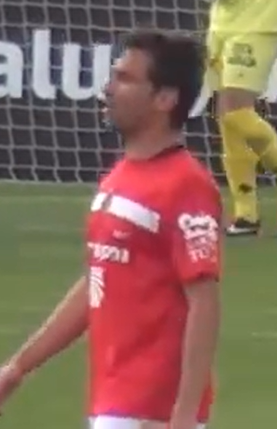
- Bueno playing for Gimnàstic in 2013

Personal information
- Full name: Aarón Bueno Gómez
- Date of birth: 21 August 1983 (age 43)
- Place of birth: Sabadell, Spain
- Height: 1.75 m (5 ft 9 in)
- Position: Winger

Youth career
- 1991–1993: Badia
- 1993–1996: Barcelona
- 1996–2002: Mercantil

Senior career*
Years	Team	Apps	(Gls)
2002–2003	Gramenet B	21	(13)
2002–2005	Gramenet	81	(13)
2005–2008	Levante B	84	(4)
2008–2009	Atlético Baleares	32	(7)
2009–2010	Ceuta	35	(14)
2010–2011	Cádiz	25	(7)
2011–2012	Sabadell	28	(6)
2012–2013	Gimnàstic	27	(5)
2013	Salamanca	0	(0)
2014	Sant Andreu	13	(1)
2014–2015	Toledo	29	(2)
2015–2016	Terrassa	9	(4)
2016–2017	Santboià	27	(5)
2017	Gavà	3	(1)
2017–2018	Viladecans		

International career
2003	Catalonia	1	(0)
- * Club domestic league appearances and goals

Aarón Bueno Gómez (born 21 August 1983) is a Spanish former footballer who played as a left winger.

== Football career ==
Born in Sabadell, Barcelona, Catalonia, Bueno started his career with UDA Gramenet. He played his first nine seasons as a senior in Segunda División B, also representing Atlético Levante UD, CD Atlético Baleares, AD Ceuta, Cádiz CF and CE Sabadell FC; he made his debut in Segunda División with the latter, his first appearance in the competition being on 27 August 2011 in a 2–1 home win against SD Huesca.

At the end of the campaign, Bueno's contract was not renewed and he signed with Real Oviedo in early August 2012 in a return to the third level. However, a week later, he cut ties with the club for personal reasons, moving to fellow league side Gimnàstic de Tarragona the same month.

On 26 June 2013, Bueno was released by Nàstic. On 11 August, he signed with Salamanca AC also in the third tier; after the latter's dissolution, he moved to UE Sant Andreu still in the third division.

On 22 July 2014, Bueno joined third level's CD Toledo.

== Personal life ==
Aarón's older brother, Nakor, was also a footballer. A forward, he spent most of his career with UE Lleida.
