= Eneko Fernández =

Spanish footballer (born 1984)

Personal information
- Full name: Eneko Fernández de Garayalde Jiménez
- Date of birth: 26 May 1984 (age 42)
- Place of birth: Zaragoza, Spain
- Height: 1.84 m (6 ft 0 in)
- Position: Winger

Youth career
- Zaragoza

Senior career*
Years	Team	Apps	(Gls)
2003–2005	Universidad Zaragoza		
2005–2007	Zaragoza B	67	(22)
2007–2008	Barcelona B	19	(1)
2008–2009	Ejea	27	(4)
2009–2010	Alavés	6	(1)
2010	→ Sabadell (loan)	15	(1)
2010–2013	Sabadell	54	(4)
2013–2015	Oviedo	39	(2)
2015–2016	Tudelano	15	(2)
- * Club domestic league appearances and goals

Eneko Fernández de Garayalde Jiménez (born 26 May 1984) is a Spanish former professional footballer who played as a right winger.

He also participated in the Spanish version of MasterChef, winning the eleventh season.
