= Jesús Olmo =

Spanish footballer

Personal information
- Full name: Jesús Olmo Lozano
- Date of birth: 24 January 1985 (age 41)
- Place of birth: Barcelona, Spain
- Height: 1.76 m (5 ft 9 1/2 in)
- Position: Centre back

Youth career
- 1994–2004: Barcelona

Senior career*
Years	Team	Apps	(Gls)
2004–2005	Barcelona C	33	(2)
2005–2007	Barcelona B	51	(1)
2006–2008	Barcelona	2	(0)
2007–2008	→ Racing Ferrol (loan)	27	(1)
2008–2010	Elche	19	(0)
2010–2011	Puertollano	28	(0)
2011–2014	Sabadell	37	(3)
2014–2019	Reus	145	(5)
2019	Elche	1	(0)
2019–2021	Sabadell	3	(0)
Total		346	(12)

International career
2001–2003	Spain U17	7	(1)
2004	Spain U19	1	(0)
- * Club domestic league appearances and goals

Jesús Olmo Lozano (born 24 January 1985) is a Spanish former professional footballer who played as a central defender.

== Club career ==
Born in Barcelona, Catalonia, Olmo emerged through FC Barcelona's prolific youth ranks at La Masia, and first represented professionally their reserves. On 20 May 2006 he made his debut for the first team, playing the full 90 minutes in a 1–3 away loss against Athletic Bilbao as a number of the main squad's players were already resting for the 2006 FIFA World Cup and Barça were already league champions.

Olmo took part in five games for the senior team during the 2006–07 pre-season, and later added a second La Liga appearance, one minute at Getafe CF (1–1 draw). After a loan in the second division with lowly Racing de Ferrol, he was released by Barcelona and joined another club in that tier, Elche CF.

After a one-year stint at Segunda División B's CD Puertollano, Olmo returned to the second division after agreeing to a contract with CE Sabadell FC. In 2014 he joined CF Reus Deportiu one level below, helping in their first-ever promotion to the second tier in 2016.

An ever-present figure for the Rojinegres, Olmo left the club in January 2019 after its ejection from the Liga de Fútbol Profesional. Late in that month, he returned to Elche on a short-term deal.

On 14 August 2019, Olmo became a free agent and returned to Sabadell, with the club now in the third tier. He spent the entire campaign nursing a serious knee injury, contributing only one appearance to his side's promotion.

Olmo terminated his contract on 9 January 2021.
