= Florian Taulemesse =

French footballer (born 1986)

Florian
Personal information
- Full name: Thierry Alain Florian Taulemesse
- Date of birth: 31 January 1986 (age 40)
- Place of birth: Bagnols-sur-Cèze, France
- Height: 1.82 m (6 ft 0 in)
- Position: Striker

Senior career*
Years	Team	Apps	(Gls)
2005–2006	Gazélec Ajaccio	20	(0)
2006–2008	Mulhouse		
2008–2009	Gueugnon	14	(4)
2009–2010	Terrassa	17	(5)
2010	Moratalla	16	(4)
2010–2011	Orihuela	37	(12)
2011–2012	Sabadell	39	(6)
2012–2013	Cartagena	39	(19)
2013–2017	Eupen	112	(43)
2017–2021	AEK Larnaca	96	(39)
2021–2022	Ethnikos Achna	14	(2)
2022–2023	Nea Salamina	30	(3)
2023–2024	La Unión Atlético	18	(4)
2024	Orihuela	12	(2)
2024–2026	Cieza	52	(27)
- * Club domestic league appearances and goals as of 16 November 2026

Thierry Alain Florian Taulemesse (born 31 January 1986), known as Florian, is a French former professional footballer who played as a striker.

== Honours ==
AEK Larnaca

- Cypriot Cup: 2017–18
