= Manuel Gato =

Spanish footballer

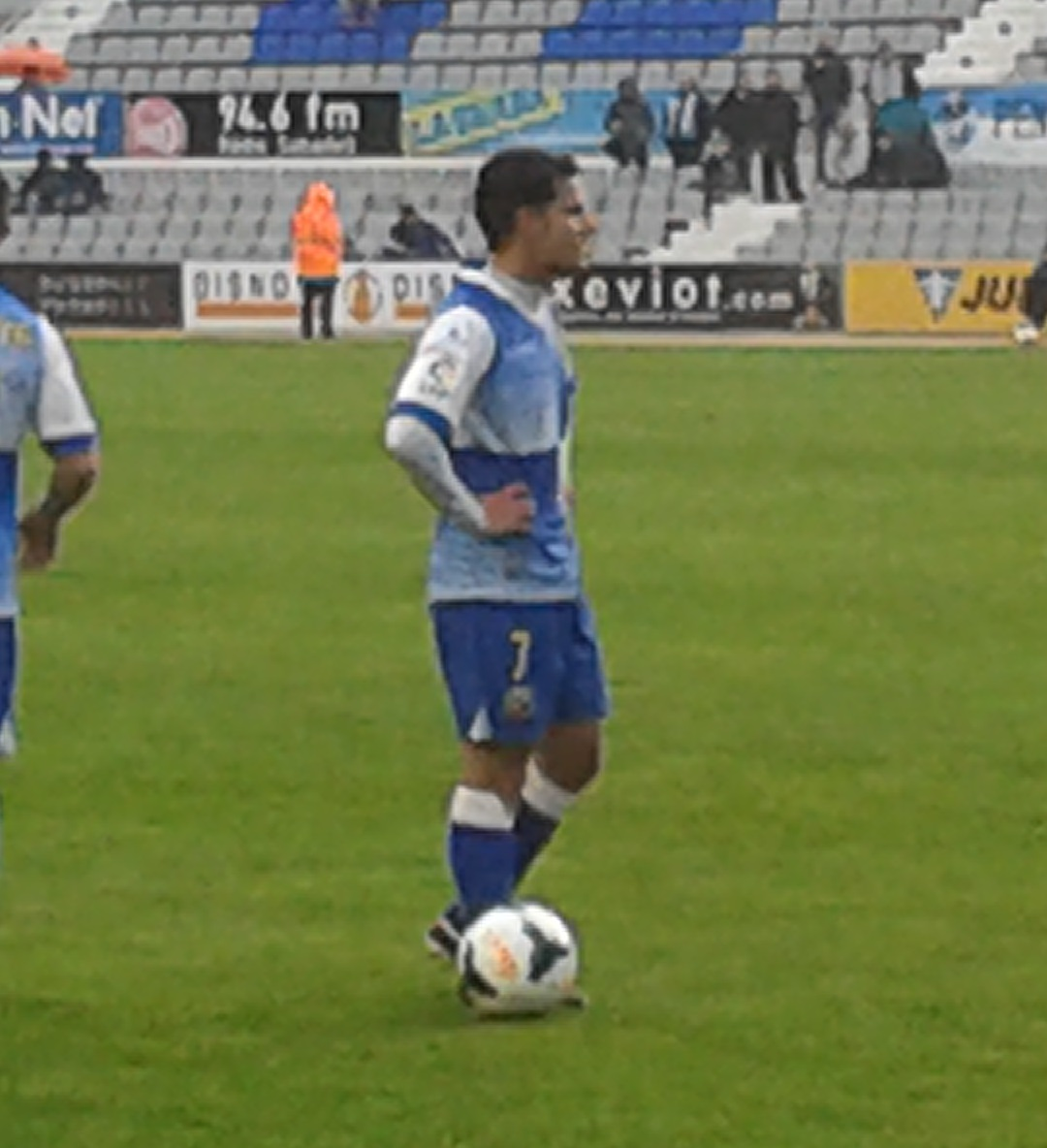
- Gato playing with Sabadell in 2014

Personal information
- Full name: Manuel Gato Thomason
- Date of birth: 28 January 1984 (age 42)
- Place of birth: Alicante, Spain
- Height: 1.69 m (5 ft 7 in)
- Position: Forward

Team information
- Current team: Novelda UD

Youth career
- Benidorm CF
- 2000–2003: Valencia

Senior career*
| Years | Team | Apps | (Gls) |
| 2003–2005 | Albacete B | | |
| 2004–2007 | Albacete | 48 | (5) |
| 2007–2009 | Pontevedra | 73 | (12) |
| 2009–2010 | Alicante | 17 | (6) |
| 2010 | Conquense | 16 | (4) |
| 2010–2012 | Alcoyano | 76 | (24) |
| 2012–2015 | Sabadell | 90 | (9) |
| 2015–2016 | Hércules | 33 | (6) |
| 2016–2018 | Alcoyano | 70 | (10) |
| 2018–2019 | Sabadell | 23 | (1) |
| 2019–2020 | Novelda CF | 15 | (6) |
| 2020–2021 | Atlético Benidorm | 22 | (6) |
| 2021–2023 | CF Benidorm | 61 | (6) |
| 2023– | Novelda UD | 81 | (5) |

International career
| 2001 | Spain U16 | 2 | (1) |
- * Club domestic league appearances and goals as of 21:13, 26 August 2026 (UTC)

Manuel Gato Thomason (born 28 January 1984 in Alicante, Valencian Community) is a Spanish footballer who plays as a forward for Novelda UD.
