= Juanjo Ciércoles =

Spanish footballer

Personal information
- Full name: Juan José Ciércoles Sagra
- Date of birth: 27 May 1988 (age 38)
- Place of birth: L'Hospitalet, Spain
- Height: 1.76 m (5 ft 9 in)
- Position: Midfielder

Youth career
- 2005–2007: Espanyol

Senior career*
Years	Team	Apps	(Gls)
2007–2011	Espanyol B	79	(4)
2010–2011	→ Sabadell (loan)	26	(0)
2011–2017	Sabadell	131	(1)
2017	Badalona	18	(0)
2018–2020	Sundsvall	58	(0)
- * Club domestic league appearances and goals

Juan José "Juanjo" Ciércoles Sagra (Spanish: [ˈxwaŋxo ˈθjeɾkoles]; born 27 May 1988) is a Spanish former footballer who played as a central midfielder.

== Club career ==
Born in L'Hospitalet de Llobregat, Barcelona, Catalonia, Ciércoles made his senior debut in the 2006–07 season with RCD Espanyol B, in Segunda División B. After four years with the side – being relegated twice from that level – he was released, and signed a two-year contract with neighbours CE Sabadell FC of the same tier.

In his debut campaign with the Arlequinats, Ciércoles appeared in 26 games (all starts) as the club returned to Segunda División after 18 years. He played his first match as a professional on 1 October, coming on as a late substitute in a 1–0 away win against FC Barcelona B.

After Sabadell's relegation in 2015, Ciércoles continued competing in the third division with that team as well as neighbouring CF Badalona. On 8 January 2018, aged 29, he moved abroad for the first time in his career, joining GIF Sundsvall from the Swedish Allsvenskan on a two-year deal.
