= Antonio Hidalgo (footballer, born 1979) =

Spanish footballer

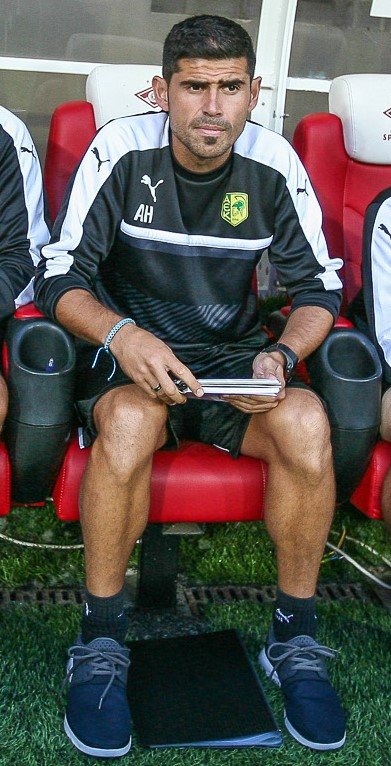
- Hidalgo with AEK Larnaca in 2016

Personal information
- Full name: Antonio Hidalgo Morilla
- Date of birth: 6 February 1979 (age 47)
- Place of birth: Granollers, Spain
- Height: 1.83 m (6 ft 0 in)
- Position: Midfielder

Team information
- Current team: Deportivo A Coruña (manager)

Youth career
- 1989–1993: Granollers
- 1993–1997: Barcelona

Senior career*
Years	Team	Apps	(Gls)
1997–1999	Barcelona C	43	(10)
1998–2000	Barcelona B	66	(4)
2000–2005	Tenerife	91	(8)
2005–2008	Málaga	109	(28)
2008–2009	Zaragoza	16	(0)
2009	→ Osasuna (loan)	12	(0)
2009–2010	Albacete	33	(9)
2010–2011	Tenerife	29	(3)
2012–2015	Sabadell	114	(11)
2015	Cornellà	5	(0)
Total		518	(73)

International career
1997	Spain U17	4	(0)
1997	Spain U18	2	(0)

Managerial career
- 2016: Granollers
- 2016–2019: AEK Larnaca (assistant)
- 2019–2021: Sabadell
- 2022–2023: Sevilla B
- 2023–2025: Huesca
- 2025–: Deportivo A Coruña
- * Club domestic league appearances and goals

Antonio Hidalgo Morilla (born 6 February 1979) is a Spanish former professional footballer who played as a central midfielder. He is currently manager of La Liga club Deportivo de A Coruña.

Over 17 seasons as a player, he appeared in 412 games in the Segunda División, scoring 57 goals for six clubs, mainly Tenerife (five years) and Sabadell (four). In La Liga, he represented Tenerife, Málaga and Osasuna.

Hidalgo started working as a manager in 2016.

== Playing career ==
Born in Granollers, Barcelona, Catalonia, Hidalgo began starting professionally with Barcelona's reserves, then went on to represent Tenerife for five seasons. After being an important element during the team's 2001 promotion, he played ten games in the following campaign's La Liga.

Hidalgo moved to Málaga in the summer of 2005, appearing in 35 matches in his first year as the Andalusia side finished bottom and were relegated. On 15 June 2008, he scored two goals in a 2–1 victory over former club Tenerife, granting top-flight promotion after a two-year absence at the expense of Real Sociedad; he finished the season with 14 league goals, best in the squad.

Hidalgo stayed in the Segunda División, however, signing a two-year contract with Real Zaragoza. In late January 2009, he joined struggling Osasuna on loan until the end of the campaign, and appeared regularly although very rarely as a starter as the Navarrese eventually stayed in the top division.

Upon his return to Aragon, Hidalgo was deemed surplus to requirements. In the dying minutes of the August 2009 transfer window, he arranged a one-year deal with second-tier club Albacete with the option of an additional year; at the end of his only season, the 31-year-old was one of 14 players who were not given a contract extension, being released.

Hidalgo then had a spell at Tenerife, suffering relegation in his sole season before joining Sabadell of his native region in January 2012, shortly before turning 33. In March 2014, the captain extended his stay with the Arlequinats for another year. When his contract ended, he played for several weeks with Cornellà in the Segunda División B before retiring in November 2015, immediately becoming a youth team coach.

== Coaching career ==
In April 2016, Hidalgo assumed his first senior management job at Granollers. After avoiding the drop, he left the Tercera División side at the end of the campaign a month later, joining his compatriot Imanol Idiakez's staff at AEK Larnaca in the Cypriot First Division.

Hidalgo left his Larnaca contract a year early in April 2019, tasked with keeping his former employers Sabadell in the third level with seven games to go. He achieved it and, the following season, he ended a five-year exile from the second tier on 26 July 2020 with a 2–1 playoff final win over Barcelona B.

Sabadell were relegated back to division three at the end of the 2020–21 campaign by the margin of a single point. Hidalgo kept his job, but on 20 November 2021, with the team in the Primera División RFEF relegation places, he was dismissed.

On 19 October 2022, Hidalgo was appointed manager of Sevilla B, bottom in the Segunda Federación, eventually managing to avoid relegation. He returned to the second tier one year later, signing for Huesca.

On 27 May 2024, having averted relegation, Hidalgo's contract was automatically extended for a further season. One year later, he announced his departure from the club.

On 10 June 2025, Hidalgo became head coach of fellow second division side Deportivo de La Coruña on a one-year deal. He achieved promotion in his first season.

== Managerial statistics ==
As of match played 21 November 2026

Managerial record by team and tenure
Team	From	To	Record								Ref
Team	From	To	G	W	D	L	GF	GA	GD	Win %	Ref
Granollers	12 April 2016	25 May 2016	5	2	1	2	7	8	−1	40.00	
Sabadell	2 April 2019	20 November 2021	97	34	29	34	105	104	+1	35.05	
Sevilla B	19 October 2022	11 October 2023	33	16	7	10	41	24	+17	48.48	
Huesca	11 October 2023	1 June 2025	80	32	22	26	94	74	+20	40.00	
Deportivo La Coruña	10 June 2025	Present	60	29	17	14	92	63	+29	48.33	
Career total			275	113	76	86	339	273	+66	41.09	—
