= Estadi de la Nova Creu Alta =

Football stadium in Sabadell, Spain

Coordinates: 41°33′17″N 2°5′31″E

Estadi Municipal de la Nova Creu Alta
- Nova Creu Alta
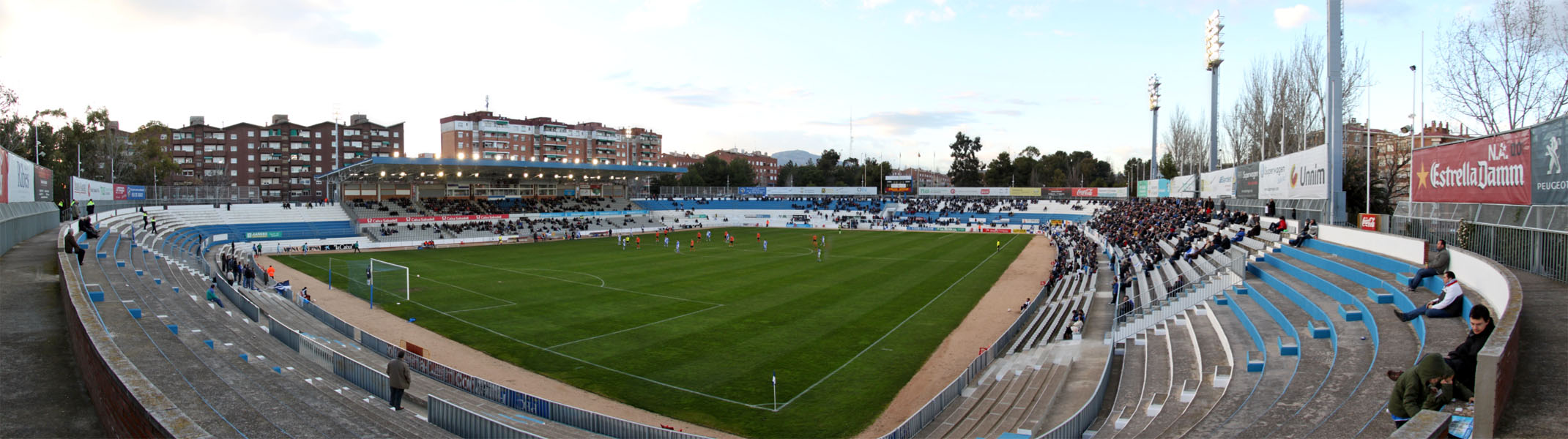
- Interactive map of Estadi Municipal de la Nova Creu Alta
- Location: Plaça Olímpia, 1, Sabadell, Catalonia, Spain
- Owner: Sabadell City Hall
- Operator: CE Sabadell FC
- Capacity: 11,908
- Surface: Grass
- Field size: 103 x 70 meters

Construction
- Opened: 20 August 1967
- Cost: 27 million pesetas
- Architect: Gabriel Bracons i Singla

Tenants
- CE Sabadell FC (Segunda División); 1967 - present

Estadi Municipal de la Nova Creu Alta is a multi-use stadium in Sabadell, Catalonia, Spain. It is currently used mostly for football matches and hosts the home matches of CE Sabadell FC. The address of the stadium is Plaça Olímpia s/n, 08206 Sabadell, and the offices of the club are in the stadium. The stadium holds 11,908 people, after the last reform. The stadium was built in 1967. During the 1992 Summer Olympics it hosted six football matches.

== 1992 Summer Olympic Games ==
- Egypt - Qatar 0 - 1
- Colombia - Qatar 1 - 1
- Colombia - Egypt 3 - 4
- Sweden - Morocco 4 - 0
- Ghana - Australia 3 - 1
- Mexico - Ghana 1 - 1

== See also ==
- CE Sabadell FC
