= José Antonio Llamas =

Spanish footballer (born 1985)

Personal information
- Full name: José Antonio Llamas Martínez
- Date of birth: 28 February 1985 (age 41)
- Place of birth: Terrassa, Spain
- Height: 1.69 m (5 ft 6 1/2 in)
- Position: Right back

Youth career
- Barcelona

Senior career*
Years	Team	Apps	(Gls)
2003–2006	Barcelona C	61	(0)
2005	Barcelona B	1	(0)
2006–2007	Hospitalet	13	(0)
2007–2008	Mazarrón	32	(0)
2008–2009	Racing Ferrol	32	(1)
2009–2010	Alicante	16	(0)
2010–2011	Granada	3	(0)
2011	Melilla	15	(0)
2011–2012	Leganés	15	(0)
2012–2014	Huesca	74	(0)
2014–2022	Sant Andreu	223	(7)

International career
2001–2003	Spain U17	9	(0)
2004	Spain U19	1	(0)
- * Club domestic league appearances and goals

José Antonio Llamas Martínez (born 28 February 1985) is a Spanish former footballer who played as a right back.

== Honours ==
Spain U17

- UEFA–CAF Meridian Cup: 2003
