= David de Navas =

Spanish footballer

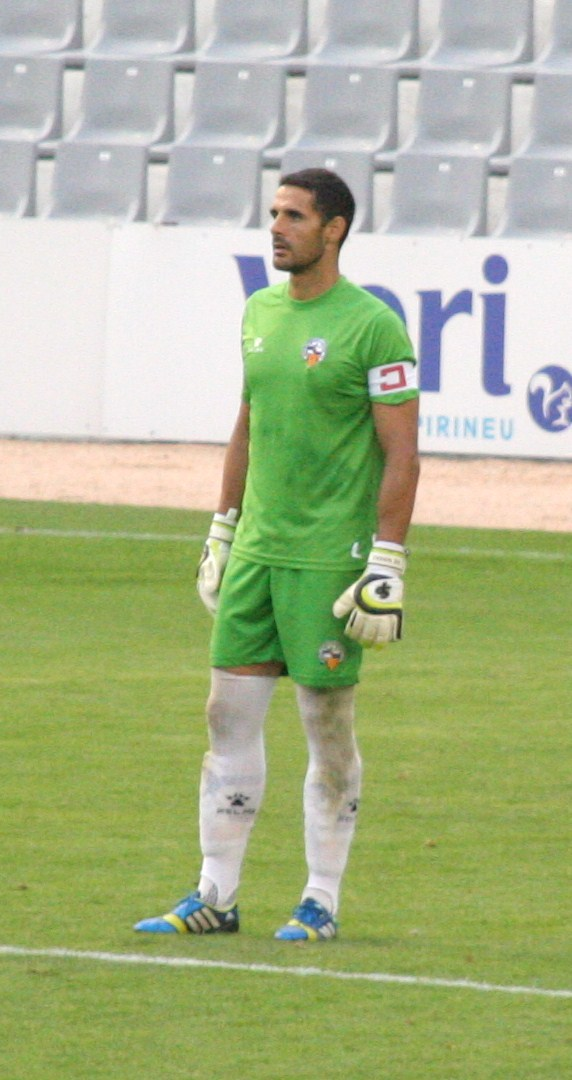
- De Navas in 2014

Personal information
- Full name: David de Navas Alcalá
- Date of birth: 7 December 1976 (age 49)
- Place of birth: Alcobendas, Spain
- Height: 1.86 m (6 ft 1 in)
- Position: Goalkeeper

Youth career
- 1985–1995: San Vicente Atlético

Senior career*
Years	Team	Apps	(Gls)
1995–1999	Amorós		
1999–2000	Manchego	37	(0)
2000–2003	Racing Ferrol	19	(0)
2003–2005	Jaén	53	(0)
2005–2006	Benidorm	12	(0)
2006	Melilla	11	(0)
2007–2015	Sabadell	198	(0)
Total		330+	(0)
- * Club domestic league appearances and goals

David de Navas Alcalá (born 7 December 1976) is a Spanish former professional footballer who played as a goalkeeper.

== Club career ==
Born in Alcobendas, Community of Madrid, de Navas played 70 games in the Segunda División over a 20-year senior career, 51 with CE Sabadell FC and 19 with Racing de Ferrol. He made his debut in the competition on 7 January 2001 while at the service of the latter club, in a 2–1 home win against Getafe CF.

In the 2011–12 season, de Navas only missed four league matches in 42 to help Catalonia's Sabadell remain in the second tier one year after promoting.
