= 2011–12 Segunda División B =

Segunda División B
- Season: 2011–12
- Champions: RM Castilla
- Promoted: Real Madrid Castilla; Mirandés; Ponferradina; CD Lugo

The 2011–12 Segunda División B season was the 35th since its establishment within the Spanish football league system. The first matches of the season were played on 20 August 2011, and the season ended on 24 June 2012 with the promotion play-off finals.

== Group 1 ==
- Teams from Asturias, Canary Islands, Castile-La Mancha, Community of Madrid and Galicia.

=== Summary before 2011–12 season ===
- Playoffs de Ascenso:
  - CD Lugo
  - CD Guadalajara (P)
  - Real Madrid Castilla
  - CD Leganés

- Promoted to This Group From Tercera División:
  - CD Toledo
  - Marino de Luanco
  - La Roda CF
  - S.S. Reyes

- Relegated to This Group From Segunda División:
  - Albacete
  - CD Tenerife

- Relegated to Tercera División:
  - Universidad LPGC
  - Deportivo B
  - Pontevedra
  - Extremadura
  - Cerro Reyes

=== Stadia and locations ===
Location of teams in Segunda División B Gr. 1 2011–12
Canary Islands

Team	Founded	Home city	Stadium	Capacity
Albacete	1940	Albacete, Castile-La Mancha	Carlos Belmonte	17,300
Alcalá	1929	Alcalá de Henares, Madrid	Municipal del Val	6,000
Atlético B	1970	Madrid, Community of Madrid	Cerro del Espino	4,000
Celta B	1988	Vigo, Galicia	Barreiro	4,500
Conquense	1946	Cuenca, Castile-La Mancha	La Fuensanta	3,500
Coruxo	1930	Coruxo, Vigo, Galicia	O Vao	1,200
Getafe B	1983	Getafe, Community of Madrid	Ciudad Deportiva	1,500
La Roda	1999	La Roda, Castilla-La Mancha	Estadio Municipal	3,000
Leganés	1928	Leganés, Community of Madrid	Butarque	8,000
Lugo	1953	Lugo, Galicia	Anxo Carro	6,000
Marino	1931	Luanco, Asturias	Miramar	5,000
Montañeros	1977	A Coruña, Galicia	Campo de Elviña Grande	1,200
Real Oviedo	1926	Oviedo, Asturias	Carlos Tartiere	30,500
Rayo B	1956	Madrid, Community of Madrid	Ciudad Deportiva	800
Real Madrid Castilla	1930	Madrid, Community of Madrid	Alfredo di Stéfano	6,000
S.S. Reyes	1971	San Sebastián de los Reyes, Madrid	Matapiñoneras	3,000
Sporting B	1967	Gijón, Asturias	Mareo	3,000
Toledo	1928	Toledo, Castile-La Mancha	Salto del Caballo	5,300
Tenerife	1922	Tenerife, Canary Islands	Heliodoro Rodríguez López	24,000
Vecindario	1942	Santa Lucía de Tirajana, Canary Islands	Municipal de Vecindario	4,500

=== League table ===
Pos	Team	Pld	W	D	L	GF	GA	GD	Pts	Qualification or relegation
1	Real Madrid Castilla (C, P)	38	23	9	6	77	36	+41	78	Qualification for Play-Off
2	Tenerife	38	18	10	10	51	32	+19	64 (Note: LUG 1–1 TEN; TEN 1–1 LUG)	Qualification for Play-Off
3	Lugo (P)	38	16	16	6	55	41	+14	64	Qualification for Play-Off
4	Albacete	38	18	9	11	56	37	+19	63	Qualification for Play-Off
5	Atlético Madrid B	38	15	15	8	58	38	+20	60 (Note: AMA 2–3 ROV; ROV 0–2 AMA)	
6	Oviedo	38	18	6	14	50	43	+7	60	Qualification for 2012–13 Copa del Rey
7	Rayo Vallecano B	38	16	8	14	53	49	+4	56	
8	Getafe B	38	14	11	13	60	63	−3	53	
9	La Roda	38	13	10	15	44	45	−1	49	Qualification for 2012–13 Copa del Rey
10	Sporting de Gijón B	38	11	15	12	42	45	−3	48	
11	Coruxo	38	11	13	14	37	48	−11	46	
12	Leganés	38	10	15	13	50	50	0	45 (Note: MAR 0–0 LEG; LEG 2–0 MAR)	
13	Marino de Luanco	38	11	12	15	40	53	−13	45	
14	SS Reyes	38	11	11	16	36	47	−11	44 (Note: SSR: 6 pts; ALC: 5 pts; CQS: 3 pts)	
15	RSD Alcalá	38	9	17	12	40	47	−7	44	
16	Conquense (R)	38	9	17	12	44	41	+3	44	Qualification for Play-out
17	Toledo (R)	38	10	12	16	37	42	−5	42	Relegation to 2012–13 Tercera División
18	Montañeros (R)	38	10	10	18	44	63	−19	40	Relegation to 2012–13 Tercera División
19	Vecindario (R)	38	10	9	19	37	66	−29	39	Relegation to 2012–13 Tercera División
20	Celta de Vigo B (R)	38	9	11	18	42	67	−25	38	Relegation to 2012–13 Tercera División

Source: futbolme
Rules for classification: 1) points; 2) head-to-head points; 3) head-to-head goal difference; 4) head-to-head goals scored; 5) goal difference; 6) number of goals scored.
(C) Champions; (P) Promoted; (R) Relegated

=== Results ===
Home \ Away	ALB	ALC	AtmB	CelB	CQS	COR	GetB	ROD	LEG	LUG	MAR	MON	ROV	RVB	RMC	SSR	SpgB	TEN	TOL	VEC
Albacete		3–2	1–2	1–0	2–2	2–0	1–2	3–0	3–2	0–0	3–0	4–2	1–2	3–1	1–0	2–0	2–2	1–2	0–0	1–0
RSD Alcalá	1–1		1–3	1–0	1–0	1–1	3–1	0–0	2–0	1–3	0–1	2–1	1–0	0–2	1–1	2–2	0–0	0–4	0–1	3–3
Atlético Madrid B	1–1	1–1		4–1	1–1	1–0	2–2	1–2	0–0	0–0	2–0	2–1	2–3	2–2	0–1	2–1	3–2	1–0	0–0	1–1
Celta de Vigo B	0–2	5–3	2–1		1–0	2–4	3–0	0–0	1–1	1–4	1–2	1–1	2–2	0–3	0–2	1–2	1–1	3–1	3–1	0–0
Conquense	0–1	0–0	0–2	1–1		1–1	3–3	3–2	3–3	0–0	3–0	0–0	1–0	1–2	0–2	1–1	2–0	1–2	3–1	0–1
Coruxo	1–0	1–1	0–0	1–0	1–1		1–1	2–1	1–0	1–2	1–1	3–0	1–1	1–1	1–1	0–1	1–0	0–1	0–0	3–1
Getafe B	1–2	2–2	2–2	1–1	0–4	2–0		3–0	2–1	0–1	1–1	1–0	1–1	0–2	2–4	3–2	1–3	1–0	1–1	2–1
La Roda	1–3	0–2	2–0	4–0	1–0	4–0	4–1		2–1	1–0	1–1	1–1	3–0	0–1	4–2	1–0	0–1	0–0	2–1	0–1
Leganés	1–3	1–1	5–2	4–0	0–1	0–0	0–0	0–1		1–1	2–0	1–1	3–2	0–0	1–3	1–1	0–0	2–0	1–0	4–0
Lugo	1–0	2–1	2–1	3–0	2–1	0–2	3–2	3–1	1–1		0–0	3–1	2–2	1–2	1–5	4–0	2–2	1–1	2–2	3–1
Marino de Luanco	0–0	0–1	0–4	4–0	1–2	4–2	2–2	3–0	0–0	0–0		2–0	0–2	1–0	1–3	0–0	1–1	0–3	2–1	2–1
Montañeros	0–3	1–1	1–6	2–2	0–0	2–2	1–3	1–0	2–2	0–1	1–3		2–1	2–1	1–1	2–1	2–1	1–0	2–0	1–0
Oviedo	1–0	1–0	0–2	3–0	1–0	2–0	1–2	1–1	5–0	1–2	1–0	2–1		3–1	1–0	2–0	2–1	1–0	0–3	3–0
Rayo Vallecano B	2–1	1–1	1–4	2–2	2–1	0–1	1–3	1–1	2–3	2–2	5–0	1–2	1–0		1–0	0–2	0–0	0–2	2–0	1–0
Real Madrid Castilla	1–1	0–0	1–0	1–1	2–2	6–0	4–0	2–2	2–1	1–0	3–2	3–2	1–3	2–0		3–0	1–0	3–1	3–0	5–0
San Sebastian Reyes	0–1	2–1	0–0	0–2	0–0	4–1	0–3	1–0	0–2	0–0	2–3	2–0	2–0	0–2	1–1		0–0	0–0	2–1	4–1
Sporting de Gijón B	2–1	0–0	0–2	0–2	0–0	2–1	3–0	1–1	4–2	1–1	1–0	3–2	0–0	2–4	1–3	0–0		1–3	1–0	2–0
Tenerife	2–1	1–2	0–0	2–1	1–1	1–0	1–0	0–0	1–0	1–1	2–2	3–0	3–0	3–1	3–1	0–2	2–3		1–0	3–0
Toledo	1–1	1–1	0–0	2–0	3–3	0–2	1–3	2–0	1–2	4–0	0–0	1–0	1–0	2–1	0–1	2–0	3–1	0–0		1–1
Vecindario	2–0	1–0	1–1	1–2	0–2	1–0	1–6	3–1	2–2	1–1	2–1	0–5	3–0	1–2	1–2	3–1	0–0	1–1	1–0	

Updated to match(es) played on 13 May 2012. Source: futbolme
Legend: Blue = home team win; Yellow = draw; Red = away team win.

=== Top goalscorers ===
Last updated 13 May 2012

Goalscorers	Goals	Team
(Spain) Joselu	19	Real Madrid Castilla
(Spain) Rubén Rivera	19	Montañeros
(Spain) Jota	16	Celta B
(Spain) Jorge Perona	16	Tenerife
(Spain) Jon Uriarte	15	Getafe B

=== Top goalkeepers ===
Last updated 13 May 2012

Goalkeeper	Goals	Matches	Average	Team
(Spain) Sergio Aragoneses	31	36	0.86	Tenerife
(Spain) Miguel Martínez	31	34	0.91	Albacete
(Spain) Diego Rivas	30	31	0.97	Lugo
(Spain) Iago Herrerín	38	38	1	Atlético B
(Spain) Juancho	38	36	1.06	Alcalá

== Group 2 ==
- Teams from Basque Country, Cantabria, Castile and León, La Rioja and Navarre.

=== Summary before 2011–12 season ===
- Playoffs de Ascenso:
  - SD Eibar
  - CD Mirandés
  - Deportivo Alavés
  - Real Unión

- Promoted to This Group From Tercera División:
  - Burgos CF
  - SD Amorebieta
  - Arandina CF
  - Sestao River Club
  - Gimnástica Segoviana CF

- Relegated to This Group From Segunda División:
  - SD Ponferradina
  - UD Salamanca

- Relegated to Tercera División:
  - Cultural Leonesa
  - Caudal Deportivo
  - CD La Muela
  - Peña Sport FC
  - Barakaldo CF

=== Stadia and locations ===
Location of teams in Segunda División B Gr. 2 2011–12

Team	Founded	Home city	Stadium	Capacity
Alavés	1921	Vitoria-Gasteiz, Basque Country	Mendizorrotza	19,500
Amorebieta	1925	Amorebieta-Etxano, Basque Country	Urritxe	3,000
Arandina	1987	Aranda de Duero, Castile and León	El Montecillo	6,000
Bilbao Athletic	1964	Bilbao, Basque Country	Lezama	2,000
Burgos	1994	Burgos, Castile and León	El Plantío	14,000
Eibar	1940	Eibar, Basque Country	Ipurua	5,200
Gimnástica Segoviana	1928	Segovia, Castile and León	La Albuera	6,500
Gimnástica Torrelavega	1907	Torrelavega, Cantabria	Santa Ana (2011); Nuevo Malecón (2012)	1,000; 6,000
Guijuelo	1974	Guijuelo, Castile and León	Municipal de Guijuelo	1,500
Lemona	1923	Lemoa, Basque Country	Arlonagusia	5,000
Logroñés	2009	Logroño, La Rioja	Las Gaunas	16,000
Mirandés	1927	Miranda de Ebro, Castile and León	Anduva	6,000
Osasuna B	1964	Pamplona, Navarre	Tajonar	2,500
Palencia	1975	Palencia, Castile and León	La Balastera	8,100
Ponferradina	1922	Ponferrada, Castile and León	El Toralín	8,300
Real Sociedad B	1951	San Sebastián, Basque Country	Zubieta	2,500
Real Unión	1915	Irún, Basque Country	Stadium Gal	5,000
Salamanca	1923	Salamanca, Castile and León	El Helmántico	17,341
Sestao River	1996	Sestao, Basque Country	Las Llanas	8,000
Zamora	1969	Zamora, Castile and León	Ruta de la Plata	8,000

=== League table ===
Pos	Team	Pld	W	D	L	GF	GA	GD	Pts	Qualification or relegation
1	Mirandés (C, P)	38	23	13	2	55	22	+33	82	Qualification for Play-Off
2	Ponferradina (P)	38	22	8	8	65	34	+31	74	Qualification for Play-Off
3	Eibar	38	17	15	6	46	35	+11	66	Qualification for Play-Off
4	Amorebieta	38	16	14	8	50	35	+15	62	Qualification for Play-Off
5	UD Logroñés	38	17	9	12	52	38	+14	60	Qualification for 2012–13 Copa del Rey
6	Alavés	38	14	17	7	64	39	+25	59	Qualification for 2012–13 Copa del Rey
7	Guijuelo	38	16	10	12	45	44	+1	58	
8	Bilbao Athletic	38	14	13	11	47	39	+8	55	
9	Salamanca	38	14	10	14	50	48	+2	52	
10	Sestao River	38	14	9	15	52	52	0	51	
11	Zamora	38	12	13	13	41	37	+4	49	
12	Real Sociedad B	38	13	9	16	50	52	−2	48 (Note: RSoB: 12 pts; OsaB: 4 pts; RUN: 1 pt)	
13	Osasuna B	38	13	9	16	49	56	−7	48	
14	Real Unión	38	12	12	14	45	43	+2	48	
15	Gimnástica Torrelavega	38	12	10	16	39	50	−11	46 (Note: PAL 2–3 TOR; TOR 1–1 PAL)	
16	Palencia (R, O)	38	12	10	16	32	46	−14	46 (Note: Although qualified for play-off and having won it, Palencia was relegated to Tercera División for not paying its players.)	Qualification for Play-out
17	Arandina (R)	38	9	12	17	38	52	−14	39	Relegation to 2012–13 Tercera División
18	Gimnástica Segoviana (R)	38	7	9	22	40	70	−30	30	Relegation to 2012–13 Tercera División
19	Lemona (R)	38	6	11	21	26	60	−34	29	Relegation to 2012–13 Tercera División
20	Burgos (R)	38	7	7	24	29	63	−34	28	Relegation to 2012–13 Tercera División

Source: futbolme
Rules for classification: 1) points; 2) head-to-head points; 3) head-to-head goal difference; 4) head-to-head goals scored; 5) goal difference; 6) number of goals scored.
(C) Champions; (O) Play-off winners; (P) Promoted; (R) Relegated

=== Results ===
Home \ Away	ALV	AMO	ARA	BAT	BUR	EIB	SEG	TOR	GUJ	LEM	LOG	MIR	OSA	PAL	PNF	RSO	RUN	SAL	SES	ZAM
Alavés		1–1	1–1	1–1	3–0	2–1	2–1	1–1	1–1	5–0	3–0	2–2	3–0	2–0	0–1	3–1	3–2	2–2	1–1	2–2
Amorebieta	2–2		3–1	2–1	3–1	0–3	3–1	4–1	1–0	1–0	1–1	0–0	1–1	2–1	3–0	1–0	4–1	1–0	3–0	1–1
Arandina	1–0	2–2		0–3	1–0	1–1	5–0	0–1	2–0	0–0	0–1	0–0	2–1	0–0	1–2	1–3	1–1	0–1	2–1	0–2
Bilbao Athletic	0–0	1–1	0–0		3–2	1–1	3–2	1–0	1–3	2–0	1–0	2–3	4–0	1–1	1–1	4–1	1–1	3–1	2–1	0–0
Burgos	0–3	0–1	2–4	1–0		0–1	1–4	1–1	1–1	2–2	0–2	1–2	1–2	2–1	2–1	0–3	1–1	1–2	1–3	0–0
Eibar	2–1	0–0	4–0	0–3	2–1		2–0	2–1	2–1	4–3	0–0	0–0	1–0	2–2	1–0	0–0	1–1	1–0	0–0	1–0
Gimnástica Segoviana	0–1	1–1	1–2	0–2	0–1	1–1		0–1	0–0	1–2	2–1	1–0	0–2	1–1	2–0	2–4	4–2	2–3	2–1	1–1
Gimnástica Torrelavega	1–1	0–1	3–2	1–1	1–0	1–0	2–1		0–1	2–1	0–5	0–2	1–2	1–1	1–1	0–1	2–0	0–2	3–1	1–1
Guijuelo	2–1	3–2	3–2	0–0	1–0	1–1	3–0	1–0		2–1	3–0	1–2	1–1	0–1	2–1	1–3	0–0	2–1	1–1	1–0
Lemona	1–1	0–0	0–0	1–0	1–0	2–2	0–1	0–1	2–3		0–2	0–1	2–1	0–0	0–4	0–0	1–0	0–2	1–1	2–1
UD Logroñés	2–1	2–1	2–2	0–0	2–0	0–0	4–1	1–0	3–1	1–1		0–0	2–1	4–1	0–1	3–1	0–1	1–2	3–1	0–1
Mirandés	0–1	1–1	4–1	2–0	0–0	2–1	1–0	2–2	1–0	3–0	1–0		2–1	3–0	0–0	2–0	2–2	4–2	2–1	1–0
Osasuna B	2–2	1–1	1–2	1–1	2–1	1–2	3–1	2–1	3–2	3–1	1–2	1–2		1–0	0–1	3–4	1–1	1–0	3–1	1–0
Palencia	0–5	2–0	1–0	1–0	0–1	2–0	0–0	2–3	1–0	2–0	1–0	0–2	1–1		1–0	0–0	0–1	1–0	1–1	1–0
Ponferradina	1–1	1–0	2–0	2–1	4–0	4–0	5–0	4–2	2–2	2–0	1–1	0–2	2–1	2–1		2–2	2–0	1–2	4–1	1–0
Real Sociedad B	0–0	0–1	0–0	0–1	0–2	1–2	4–3	0–2	0–1	4–0	2–2	1–1	3–0	3–0	0–3		1–0	1–1	0–2	2–3
Real Unión	2–1	0–0	1–1	3–0	2–0	1–2	2–0	1–0	3–0	2–0	2–0	0–0	2–3	3–1	1–2	0–1		3–1	0–1	1–1
Salamanca	2–2	1–0	2–1	1–2	1–1	1–2	1–1	0–0	4–0	0–0	0–2	1–2	0–0	0–1	2–2	2–1	1–0		3–2	1–2
Sestao River	2–1	2–0	2–0	2–0	2–0	0–0	2–2	3–1	0–1	2–1	3–1	0–0	3–1	3–2	1–2	1–2	1–1	1–3		2–0
Zamora	1–2	2–1	1–0	3–0	1–2	1–1	1–1	1–1	0–0	2–1	1–2	0–1	0–0	2–1	0–1	3–1	3–1	2–2	2–0	

Updated to match(es) played on 13 May 2012. Source: futbolme
Legend: Blue = home team win; Yellow = draw; Red = away team win.

=== Top goalscorers ===
Last updated 13 May 2012

Goalscorers	Goals	Team
(Spain) Diego Cervero	20	Logroñés
(Brazil) Yuri de Souza	19	Ponferradina
(Spain) Roberto Torres	16	Osasuna B
(Spain) Pablo Infante	13	Mirandés
(Spain) Fran Dorado	13	Gimnástica Segoviana

=== Top goalkeepers ===
Last updated 13 May 2012

Goalkeeper	Goals	Matches	Average	Team
(Spain) Igor Etxebarrieta	30	36	0.83	Amorebieta
(Spain) Xabi Iruretagoiena	28	33	0.85	Eibar
(Spain) Juan Carlos Castilla	23	27	0.85	UD Logroñés
(Spain) Sergio Sánchez	30	33	0.91	Zamora
(Spain) Orlando Quintana	27	29	0.93	Ponferradina

== Group 3 ==
- Teams from Aragon, Balearic Islands, Catalonia and Valencian Community.

=== Summary before 2011–12 season ===
- Playoffs de Ascenso:
  - CE Sabadell FC (P)
  - CF Badalona
  - CD Alcoyano (P)
  - Orihuela CF

- Promoted to This Group From Tercera División:
  - UE Llagostera
  - Andorra CF
  - Valencia Mestalla
  - CD Manacor
  - CF Reus Deportiu
  - CD Olímpic de Xàtiva
  - Huracán Valencia

- Relegated to This Group From Segunda División:
  - None

- Relegated to Tercera División:
  - Alicante CF
  - CD Castellón
  - Benidorm CF
  - UD Alzira
  - UDA Gramenet
  - FC Santboià

=== Stadia and locations ===
Location of teams in Segunda División B Gr. 3 2011–12

Team	Founded	Home city	Stadium	Capacity
Andorra	1957	Andorra, Aragon	Juan Antonio Endeiza	3,000
Atlético Baleares	1920	Palma de Mallorca, Balearic Islands	Balear	18,000
Badalona	1903	Badalona, Catalonia	Camp del Centenari	10,000
Dénia	1927	Dénia, Valencian Community	Camp Nou	3,000
Gandía	1947	Gandía, Valencian Community	Guillermo Olagüe	6,000
Huracán Valencia	2011	Manises, Valencian Community	Municipal de Manises	1,500
L'Hospitalet	1957	L'Hospitalet de Llobregat, Catalonia	Feixa Llarga	6,740
Llagostera	1947	Llagostera, Catalonia	Estadi Municipal	1,500
Lleida Esportiu	2011	Lleida, Catalonia	Camp d'Esports	15,000
Mallorca B	1983	Palma de Mallorca, Balearic Islands	Ciudad Deportiva	2,000
Manacor	1923	Manacor, Balearic Islands	Na Capellera	4,000
Olímpic de Xàtiva	1932	Xàtiva, Valencian Community	La Murta	9,000
Ontinyent	1947	Ontinyent, Valencian Community	El Clariano	5,000
Orihuela	1993	Orihuela, Valencian Community	Los Arcos	5,000
Reus Deportiu	1909	Reus, Catalonia	Estadi Municipal	4,500
Sant Andreu	1925	Barcelona, Catalonia	Narcís Sala	18,000
Sporting Mahonés	1974	Mahón, Balearic Islands	Municipal de Bintaufa	3,000
Teruel	1946	Teruel, Aragon	Campo de Pinilla	4,000
Valencia Mestalla	1944	Valencia, Valencian Community	Paterna	4,000
Zaragoza B	1962	Zaragoza, Aragon	Ciudad Deportiva	2,500

=== League table ===
Pos	Team	Pld	W	D	L	GF	GA	GD	Pts	Qualification or relegation
1	Atlético Baleares (C)	38	21	9	8	65	39	+26	72	Qualification for Play-Off
2	Orihuela	38	18	14	6	50	33	+17	68 (Note: Orihuela was relegated before start of next season for not pay the aval required by RFEF for compete next season. However, they were readmitted in Segunda División B before celebrating the third matchday.)	Qualification for Play-Off
3	Huracán Valencia	38	18	12	8	48	30	+18	66	Qualification for Play-Off
4	Badalona	38	18	11	9	48	26	+22	65	Qualification for Play-Off
5	Llagostera	38	18	10	10	44	28	+16	64	Qualification for 2012–13 Copa del Rey
6	L'Hospitalet	38	17	11	10	46	34	+12	62	Qualification for 2012–13 Copa del Rey
7	Lleida Esportiu	38	16	11	11	50	40	+10	59	Qualification for 2012–13 Copa del Rey
8	Reus Deportiu	38	15	12	11	43	37	+6	57 (Note: REU 1–0 XAT; XAT 0–0 REU)	
9	Olímpic Xàtiva	38	15	12	11	41	28	+13	57	
10	Sant Andreu	38	14	11	13	47	44	+3	53	
11	Teruel	38	12	16	10	45	43	+2	52	
12	Mallorca B	38	14	9	15	49	47	+2	51	
13	Valencia Mestalla	38	13	11	14	52	54	−2	50	
14	Ontinyent	38	13	10	15	39	44	−5	49	
15	Dénia (R)	38	13	8	17	39	38	+1	47 (Note: Dénia was relegated to Tercera División for not paying its players.)	
16	Zaragoza B (O)	38	11	11	16	46	60	−14	44	Qualification for Play-out
17	Andorra (R)	38	11	7	20	40	55	−15	40	Relegation to 2012–13 Tercera División
18	Gandía (R)	38	8	13	17	34	49	−15	37	Relegation to 2012–13 Tercera División
19	Manacor (R)	38	6	6	26	39	74	−35	24	Relegation to 2012–13 Tercera División
20	Sporting Mahonés (D)	38	5	4	29	13	75	−62	16 (Note: Sporting Mahonés were deducted 3 points due to a non-appearance and retired from the competition due to their non-appearance for two matches in a row.)	Relegation to 2012–13 Tercera División

Source: futbolme
Rules for classification: 1) points; 2) head-to-head points; 3) head-to-head goal difference; 4) head-to-head goals scored; 5) goal difference; 6) number of goals scored.
(C) Champions; (D) Disqualified; (O) Play-off winners; (R) Relegated

=== Results ===
Home \ Away	AND	BAL	BAD	DEN	GAN	HUR	HOS	LAG	LLE	MLL	MAN	XAT	ONT	ORI	REU	SAN	MAH	TER	VMS	ZarB
Andorra		1–2	0–1	2–0	1–1	0–1	1–0	0–1	2–3	1–3	1–2	0–0	1–0	1–2	3–2	1–2	3–1	1–1	0–1	1–2
Atlético Baleares	1–1		3–2	3–0	3–1	1–2	2–2	2–0	0–1	3–1	3–2	1–0	3–0	2–1	1–0	0–0	3–0	3–0	3–2	3–4
Badalona	3–0	0–0		1–0	1–0	1–1	2–0	0–1	0–0	1–0	2–0	1–2	0–0	1–2	1–0	1–1	2–0	2–2	2–3	2–1
Dénia	0–1	0–0	0–2		3–2	1–1	1–0	2–0	0–1	4–0	2–1	1–0	1–1	3–0	3–1	1–2	4–1	2–2	1–0	3–0
Gandía	1–2	0–0	1–1	0–1		0–3	0–1	2–1	0–3	0–2	4–1	2–1	0–0	0–0	0–1	1–0	2–1	2–2	0–0	4–6
Huracán Valencia	3–0	1–0	0–0	1–1	1–1		3–1	0–0	0–2	1–2	0–2	1–0	1–1	0–1	2–1	1–0	2–0	2–0	3–0	1–1
L'Hospitalet	3–2	2–2	0–1	1–0	2–0	1–0		1–0	0–0	1–1	2–0	1–1	2–0	1–1	1–0	3–2	2–0	1–1	1–1	1–0
Llagostera	2–0	1–2	0–0	1–0	3–0	1–1	0–0		3–1	4–2	3–0	0–2	1–3	1–3	2–2	0–0	2–0	2–0	4–2	1–0
Lleida Esportiu	0–0	0–0	1–3	3–2	1–1	1–1	1–4	0–0		1–0	3–0	3–0	2–0	1–2	1–3	1–1	2–0	2–0	1–0	4–0
Mallorca B	4–0	1–2	0–1	1–0	1–0	0–1	3–1	2–0	2–1		4–2	0–1	0–0	1–1	0–0	1–1	0–0	1–2	4–3	0–1
Manacor	1–3	0–2	0–3	2–0	0–2	1–2	1–2	0–1	1–2	1–1		1–1	1–5	1–2	0–0	1–3	1–1	2–2	3–0	3–1
Olímpic de Xàtiva	3–0	3–0	2–1	2–0	1–1	0–0	0–2	1–0	1–0	0–3	1–1		3–0	2–1	0–0	0–0	2–0	1–1	0–0	2–0
Ontinyent	2–1	2–3	0–1	2–0	0–2	0–1	1–0	0–2	3–0	2–0	3–0	0–0		2–0	1–1	1–0	2–0	1–0	1–2	2–2
Orihuela	2–2	1–1	0–0	1–0	1–0	4–1	1–2	0–0	0–0	0–0	4–3	0–3	0–0		1–1	2–1	4–0	1–0	3–0	1–0
Reus	2–4	1–0	2–1	1–0	0–0	1–3	1–0	0–1	0–0	3–1	1–0	1–0	1–0	1–1		2–1	2–0	1–1	2–1	2–3
Sant Andreu	0–1	2–1	1–1	1–0	1–1	2–5	2–1	0–1	3–1	1–0	3–2	2–1	1–1	0–0	2–1		6–0	1–0	2–4	1–1
Sporting Mahonés	0–2	0–2	0–4	0–2	0–0	1–0	0–2	0–3	1–0	0–2	0–2	2–1	1–2	0–3	0–1	1–0		1–1	1–0	0–2
Teruel	2–1	1–2	1–0	0–0	2–1	1–0	1–0	0–0	2–1	5–1	2–1	0–0	4–0	1–1	0–3	2–1	2–0		1–1	1–1
Valencia Mestalla	0–0	3–1	1–0	0–0	2–0	1–2	1–1	0–2	3–3	1–1	2–0	0–3	3–1	0–1	2–2	3–0	3–0	3–2		1–1
Zaragoza B	1–0	1–5	1–3	1–1	0–2	0–0	1–1	0–0	2–3	1–4	1–0	2–1	4–0	1–2	0–0	0–1	2–1	0–0	2–3	

Updated to match(es) played on 13 May 2012. Source: futbolme
Legend: Blue = home team win; Yellow = draw; Red = away team win.

=== Top goalscorers ===
Last updated 13 May 2012

Goalscorers	Goals	Team
(Spain) Jesús Perera	23	Atlético Baleares
(Spain) Nico Rubio	15	Manacor
(Spain) Marc Jiménez	15	Sant Andreu
(Spain) Alberto Morales	15	Andorra
(Spain) Ibán Espadas	14	Orihuela

=== Top goalkeepers ===
Last updated 13 May 2012

Goalkeeper	Goals	Matches	Average	Team
(Spain) Wilfred Muñoz	25	36	0.69	Llagostera
(Spain) Marcos Pérez	26	37	0.7	Badalona
(Spain) Francis Solar	26	35	0.74	Olímpic Xàtiva
(Spain) Paco Fernández	29	36	0.81	Huracán Valencia
(Spain) Carlos Craviotto	32	36	0.89	L'Hospitalet

== Group 4 ==
- Teams from Andalusia, Castile-La Mancha, Ceuta, Extremadura, Melilla and Murcia.

=== Summary before 2011–12 season ===
- Playoffs de Ascenso:
  - Real Murcia (P)
  - Sevilla Atlético
  - UD Melilla
  - Cádiz CF

- Promoted to This Group From Tercera División:
  - CF Villanovense
  - Real Balompédica Linense
  - Sporting Villanueva Promesas

- Relegated to This Group From Segunda División:
  - None

- Relegated to Tercera División:
  - CD Alcalá
  - Unión Estepona CF
  - Yeclano Deportivo
  - Jumilla CF

=== Stadia and locations ===
Location of teams in Segunda División B Gr. 4 2011–12

Team	Founded	Home city	Stadium	Capacity
Almería B	2001	Almería, Andalusia	Juan Rojas; Juegos del Mediterraneo	13,000; 23,000
Badajoz	1905	Badajoz, Extremadura	Nuevo Vivero	15,000
Betis B	1962	Seville, Andalusia	Ciudad Deportiva	4,000
Cacereño	1919	Cáceres, Extremadura	Príncipe Felipe	7,000
Cádiz	1910	Cádiz, Andalusia	Ramón de Carranza	20,000
Ceuta	1996	Ceuta	Alfonso Murube	6,000
Écija	1968	Écija, Andalusia	San Pablo	6,000
Real Jaén	1922	Jaén, Andalusia	Nuevo La Victoria	12,000
La Unión	2011	La Unión, Region of Murcia	Polideportivo Municipal	3,500
Linense	1912	La Línea de la Concepción, Andalusia	Municipal de La Línea	12,000
Lorca Atlético	2010	Lorca, Region of Murcia	Francisco Artés Carrasco	8,000
Lucena	1986	Lucena, Andalusia	Municipal de Lucena	6,000
Melilla	1976	Melilla	Álvarez Claro	12,000
Poli Ejido	1969	El Ejido, Andalusia	Municipal Santo Domingo	7,800
Puertollano	1948	Puertollano, Castile-La Mancha	Ciudad de Puertollano	8,000
Roquetas	1933	Roquetas de Mar, Andalusia	Antonio Peroles	9,000
San Roque	1956	Lepe, Andalusia	Municipal de Lepe	3,500
Sevilla Atlético	1958	Seville, Andalusia	Ciudad Deportiva	7,000
Sporting Villanueva	1993	Villanueva del Fresno, Extremadura	Estadio Municipal	3,000
Villanovense	1992	Villanueva de la Serena, Extremadura	Romero Cuerda	6,000

=== League table ===
Pos	Team	Pld	W	D	L	GF	GA	GD	Pts	Qualification or relegation
1	Cádiz (C)	38	21	13	4	62	23	+39	76	Qualification for Play-Off
2	Linense	38	21	9	8	57	33	+24	72 (Note: LUC 0–0 LIN; LIN 2–0 LUC)	Qualification for Play-Off
3	Lucena	38	21	9	8	53	30	+23	72	Qualification for Play-Off
4	Real Jaén	38	19	13	6	48	31	+17	70	Qualification for Play-Off
5	Melilla	38	18	10	10	50	33	+17	64	Qualification for 2012–13 Copa del Rey
6	San Roque	38	18	7	13	43	35	+8	61 (Note: CAC 0–0 SRQ; SRQ 2–1 CAC)	Qualification for 2012–13 Copa del Rey
7	Cacereño	38	15	16	7	48	33	+15	61	Qualification for 2012–13 Copa del Rey
8	Betis B	38	18	5	15	58	59	−1	59	
9	Villanovense	38	17	7	14	53	52	+1	58	
10	Sevilla Atlético	38	15	10	13	56	45	+11	55	
11	Puertollano (R)	38	13	12	13	46	49	−3	51 (Note: Puertollano, Badajoz and Ceuta were relegated to Tercera División for not paying their players.)	
12	Badajoz (R)	38	14	8	16	60	58	+2	50 (Note: BDJ 1–2 AlmB; AlmB 1–2 BDJ)	
13	Almería B	38	13	11	14	50	60	−10	50	
14	Ceuta (R)	38	13	10	15	47	49	−2	49	
15	Écija	38	11	13	14	33	36	−3	46	
16	Lorca Atlético (R)	38	10	12	16	39	52	−13	42	Qualification for Play-out
17	Roquetas (R)	38	11	8	19	34	55	−21	41	Relegation to 2012–13 Tercera División
18	La Unión (R)	38	10	8	20	33	49	−16	38	Relegation to 2012–13 Tercera División
19	Sporting Villanueva (D)	38	2	11	25	16	42	−26	14 (Note: Sporting Villanueva were deducted 3 points due to a non-appearance and retired from the competition due to their non-appearance for two matches in a row.)	Relegation to 2012–13 Tercera División
20	Poli Ejido (D)	38	2	4	32	13	75	−62	7 (Note: Poli Ejido were deducted 3 points due to a non-appearance and retired from the competition due to their non-appearance for two matches in a row.)	Relegation to 2012–13 Tercera División

Source: futbolme
Rules for classification: 1) points; 2) head-to-head points; 3) head-to-head goal difference; 4) head-to-head goals scored; 5) goal difference; 6) number of goals scored.
(C) Champions; (D) Disqualified; (R) Relegated

=== Results ===
Home \ Away	AlmB	BDJ	RBB	CAC	CÁD	CEU	ECJ	RJN	UNI	LIN	LOA	LUC	MEL	PLD	PRT	ROQ	SRQ	SAT	SVIL	VNV
Almería B		1–2	3–2	2–1	0–4	1–1	0–0	0–1	0–0	2–4	3–2	2–0	0–1	0–0	2–2	1–3	3–2	1–1	1–0	2–2
Badajoz	1–2		1–1	1–1	0–0	3–4	3–2	1–3	2–1	1–2	0–0	1–2	1–1	3–1	4–0	4–0	1–2	2–1	3–0	3–1
Betis B	2–3	3–1		1–1	1–2	3–3	1–4	0–1	2–1	1–0	1–2	0–0	1–0	2–0	1–0	1–2	1–0	2–0	1–0	3–1
Cacereño	2–1	2–1	4–0		0–0	2–1	1–3	0–0	3–1	0–0	3–0	1–1	2–0	3–2	2–2	0–0	0–0	1–1	1–0	1–1
Cádiz	6–1	3–0	2–1	3–1		0–0	2–0	0–0	0–0	1–1	4–1	4–0	2–0	3–0	1–1	2–1	1–1	0–0	1–0	3–1
Ceuta	2–0	1–5	1–2	2–3	0–2		0–0	1–1	1–0	2–1	1–1	0–0	1–0	1–1	2–0	1–0	1–2	2–1	3–1	0–1
Écija	0–0	2–2	2–3	0–2	0–0	1–0		0–1	1–0	1–0	1–0	1–1	0–1	5–1	3–0	0–0	0–1	1–1	1–0	1–0
Real Jaén	3–2	1–2	0–3	0–0	1–1	2–2	3–0		2–1	1–1	2–0	1–0	0–2	2–0	2–0	3–1	1–0	4–1	1–0	0–0
La Unión	2–4	1–0	2–3	0–0	3–1	0–2	2–0	0–1		2–1	1–1	0–3	1–2	2–0	0–0	0–3	0–1	3–2	1–1	0–1
Linense	4–2	1–0	1–0	0–0	0–2	1–0	1–0	2–0	1–1		1–1	2–0	0–1	2–0	3–1	2–0	1–0	1–1	2–1	3–5
Lorca Atlético	1–0	3–1	2–3	1–0	1–4	1–1	1–1	1–1	2–0	0–3		1–1	2–1	4–1	0–2	1–1	0–0	1–0	1–0	0–3
Lucena	1–2	4–0	5–1	0–1	3–0	2–1	2–0	1–0	1–2	0–0	2–1		1–0	2–0	3–3	1–0	2–0	1–0	1–1	1–0
Melilla	3–3	1–1	4–0	0–0	2–2	3–1	1–0	1–2	3–1	1–2	2–2	0–1		2–0	1–0	2–0	2–1	2–1	1–1	1–1
Poli Ejido	0–2	0–2	0–2	0–2	0–2	0–2	0–2	0–0	0–2	0–1	0–2	0–2	0–2		0–2	0–1	1–1	0–3	1–2	4–1
Puertollano	1–1	3–2	2–5	1–0	0–1	2–1	4–0	1–1	0–0	1–1	2–0	1–2	0–0	2–0		0–1	2–0	1–1	1–0	1–2
Roquetas	0–1	0–2	2–1	2–2	1–2	1–2	0–0	4–4	1–0	0–3	1–0	0–1	1–1	2–0	0–3		0–3	1–0	1–1	1–2
San Roque	2–1	0–1	1–2	2–1	1–0	2–1	0–0	2–0	2–1	4–0	3–2	1–0	0–1	2–0	0–2	1–0		2–0	0–0	1–1
Sevilla Atlético	0–1	2–0	1–1	2–0	1–0	3–2	2–1	1–1	2–0	0–4	1–0	1–1	1–0	2–0	5–0	7–2	5–2		2–1	2–2
Sporting Villanueva	0–0	1–1	3–0	1–3	0–0	0–1	0–0	0–1	0–1	0–1	0–0	0–1	0–1	0–1	1–1	0–1	0–1	0–1		0–1
Villanovense	2–0	5–2	2–1	1–2	0–1	1–0	0–0	0–1	0–2	1–4	1–0	2–4	1–4	3–0	1–2	1–0	1–0	2–1	3–1	

Updated to match(es) played on 13 May 2012. Source: futbolme
Legend: Blue = home team win; Yellow = draw; Red = away team win.

=== Top goalscorers ===
Last updated 13 May 2012

Goalscorers	Goals	Team
(Japan) Hiroshi Ibusuki	20	Sevilla Atlético
(Spain) Guzmán Casaseca	15	Ceuta
(Spain) Hugo Díaz	13	Lucena
(Spain) Hugo Salamanca	13	Lorca Atlético
(Spain) Chota	13	Melilla

=== Top goalkeepers ===
Last updated 13 May 2012

Goalkeeper	Goals	Matches	Average	Team
(Spain) Oinatz Aulestia	22	35	0.63	Cádiz
(Spain) José Ramón Rodríguez	24	29	0.83	San Roque
(Spain) Pedro Dorronsoro	25	29	0.86	Melilla
(Spain) Toni García	30	34	0.88	Real Jaén
(Spain) René Román	30	32	0.94	Cacereño

== See also ==
- 2011–12 Segunda División
- 2012 Segunda División B play-offs
- 2011–12 Tercera División
- 2011–12 Copa del Rey
