= Cunco =

Cunco may refer to:

- Cunco people
- Cunco, Chile
- Cunco Castle near Villanueva del Fresno, Spain
