= 2011 Tercera División play-offs =

Spanish football league play-offs

The 2011 Tercera División play-offs to Segunda División B from Tercera División (Promotion play-offs) were the final playoffs for the promotion from 2010–11 Tercera División to 2011–12 Segunda División B. The first four teams in each group took part in the play-off.

== Format ==
The eighteen group winners had the opportunity to be promoted directly to Segunda División B. The eighteen group winners were drawn into a two-legged series where the nine winners promoted to Segunda División B. The nine losing clubs entered the play-off round for the last nine promotion spots.

The eighteen runners-up were drawn against one of the seventeen fourth-placed clubs outside their group and the eighteen third-placed clubs were drawn against one another in a two-legged series. The twenty-seven winners advanced with the nine losing clubs from the champions' series to determine the eighteen teams that entered the last two-legged series for the last nine promotion spots. In all the playoff series, the lower-ranked club played at home first. Whenever there was a tie in position (e.g. like the group winners in the champions' series or the third-placed teams in the first round), a draw determined the club to play at home first.

== Teams for 2010–11 play-offs ==
- All groups as 38 of 38 rounds.
- The teams highlighted in yellow played the play-offs to Segunda División B.
- The teams highlighted in red were relegated to Divisiones Regionales.

Teams - Group 1 (Galicia)	Pts
Cerceda	83
Racing de Ferrol	73
Ourense	67
Racing Villalbés	63
Pontevedra B	37
Santa Comba	35
Narón	31
Portonovo	22

Teams - Group 2 (Asturias)	Pts
Marino	84
Universidad de Oviedo	79
Langreo	77
Tuilla	75
Andés	37
Ribadesella	32
Praviano	21

Teams - Group 3 (Cantabria)	Pts
Noja	82
Rayo Cantabria	79
Racing B	78
Siete Villas	71
Solares	34
Santoña	24
Reocín	(R)

Teams - Group 4 (Basque C.)	Pts
Amorebieta	81
Laudio	76
Sestao River	74
Durango	68
Santurtzi	38
Amurrio	32
Aurrerá de Vitoria	31

Teams - Group 5(Catalonia)	Pts
Llagostera	73
Montañesa	67
Pobla Mafumet	67
Reus Deportiu	65
Palamós	41
Ascó	29
Premiá	27

Teams - Group 6 (Valencian C.)	Pts
Valencia Mestalla	86
Olímpic Xàtiva	73
Novelda	68
La Nucía	66
Burjassot	40
Villajoyosa	37
Puçol	30

Teams - Group 7 (C. of Madrid)	Pts
Alcobendas Sport	75
Pozuelo Alarcón	65
Villaviciosa Odón	63
S.S. Reyes	63
S. Fernando Henares	47
Vallecas	36
Las Rozas	24
Coslada	21

Teams - Group 8 (C. and León)	Pts
Burgos	84
Villaralbo	83
Gimn. Segoviana	81
Arandina	78
Cultural Cebrereña	30
Santa Marta	29
Venta de Baños	25

Teams - Group 9 (E. Andalusia)	Pts
Comarca de Níjar	79
Alhaurín de la Torre	78
Loja	74
Atl. Malagueño	70
Casino del Real	34
Alhaurino	30
Adra	(R)

Teams - Group 10 (W. Andalusia)	Pts
Linense	76
San Fernando	72
Pozoblanco	71
Mairena	63
Jerez Industrial	42
Peñarroya	34
Los Barrios	20

Teams - Group 11 (Balearic I.)	Pts
Manacor	79
Poblense	78
Constancia	78
Binissalem	76
Penya Arrabal	27
Norteño	27
Arenal	25

Teams - Group 12 (Canary I.)	Pts
Lanzarote	79
Las Palmas Atlético	78
Tenerife B	72
Granadilla	71
Or. Marítima	45
San Isidro	44
Guía	42
Realejos	23

Teams - Group 13 (Murcia)	Pts
Costa Cálida	86
Real Murcia B	84
Mar Menor	83
Cartagena La Unión	81
Puente Tocinos	33
Beniel	15
LD Olímpico	(R)

Teams - Group 14(Extremadura)	Pts
Villanovense	93
Sp. Villanueva	92
Arroyo	70
Jerez	64
Santa Marta	35
Olivenza	30
Imperio	18

Teams - Group 15 (Navarre)	Pts
Tudelano	90
Izarra	83
Valle de Egüés	67
Mutilvera	66
Lagun Artea	37
River Ega	27
Peña Azagresa	25

Teams - Group 16 (La Rioja)	Pts
Náxara	88
SD Logroñés	88
Anguiano	80
Haro	78
Cenicero	23
Aldeano	21
AF Calahorra	20

Teams - Group 17 (Aragon)	Pts
Andorra	84
Real Zaragoza B	79
Utebo	79
Binéfar	71
Altorricón	35
Pomar	35
Santa Isabel	28
Mallén	17

Teams - Group 18 (Castile-La Mancha)	Pts
Toledo	88
Albacete B	75
La Roda	75
Almansa	72
Chozas de Canales	34
Piedrabuena	16
U. Criptanense	12

== Eliminatories ==
- The regular season ended on 15 May 2011.
- The draw of play-offs were held in the RFEF headquarters on 16 May at 17:00. (CEST+2).
- The play-offs began on 21 May and will end on 26 June 2011.

=== 1st eliminatory ===
For group champions only.

Times are UTC+02:00

Home Matches:
21 May 2011
Costa Cálida	2–2	Marino	18:00
Valencia Mestalla	1–0	Alcobendas Sport	18:00
Amorebieta	3–0	Manacor	18:00
Toledo	4–0	Náxara	19:00
Villanovense	2–0	Comarca de Níjar	19:00
22 May 2011
Tudelano	1–0	Linense	12:00
Lanzarote	2–1	Burgos	12:00
Andorra	1–0	Noja	17:30
Llagostera	2–0	Cerceda	18:00

Away Matches:
28 May 2011
Marino	3–0	Costa Cálida	17:30 — Agg: 5–2
Comarca de Níjar	1–0	Villanovense	17:30 — Agg: 1–2
29 May 2011
Alcobendas Sport	0–2	Valencia Mestalla	12:00 — Agg: 0–3
Burgos	4–0	Lanzarote	12:00 — Agg: 5–2
Manacor	0–1	Amorebieta	12:00 — Agg: 0–4
Náxara	1–1	Toledo	18:00 — Agg: 1–4
Cerceda	0–1	Llagostera	18:00 — Agg: 0–3
Noja	1–1	Andorra	18:00 — Agg: 1–2
Linense	4–0	Tudelano	19:00 — Agg: 4–1

- Promoted to Segunda División B: Marino de Luanco, Villanovense, Valencia Mestalla, Burgos, Amorebieta, Toledo, Llagostera, Andorra and Linense.
- Losers:Costa Cálida, Comarca de Níjar, Alcobendas Sport, Lanzarote, Manacor, Náxara, Cerceda, Noja and Tudelano, continue in the 2nd eliminatory

=== 1st eliminatory (2nd, 3rd and 4th of group) ===
For 2nd, 3rd and 4th of group only. 2nds played against 4ths and 3rds played against each other.

Times are UTC+02:00

Home Matches:
21 May 2011
Pobla Mafumet	1–0	Constancia	17:00
Binissalem	1–0	Sp. Villanueva	18:00
Racing Villalbés	2–1	Alhaurín de la Torre	18:00
Valle de Egüés	0–0	Racing B	18:00
Arandina	2–1	Albacete B	18:30
Arroyo	1–2	Gimn. Segoviana	19:00
Binéfar	1–0	Racing de Ferrol	19:00
La Nucía	1–0	Laudio	19:00
Novelda	0–0	Anguiano	20:00
22 May 2011
Atl. Malagueño	0–2	Olímpic Xàtiva	11:30
Granadilla	0–1	SD Logroñés	12:00
S.S. Reyes	4–1	Villaralbo	12:00
Mairena	2–0	Real Zaragoza B	12:00
Mutilvera	3–1	Poblense	12:00
Tenerife B	0–1	Sestao River	12:00
Tuilla	0–2	Las Palmas At.	17:00
Siete Villas	1–1	Pozuelo Alarcón	17:00
Reus Deportiu	1–1	Univ. Oviedo	18:00
Cartagena La Unión	1–1	Montañesa	18:00
Ourense	2–0	Villaviciosa Odón	18:00
Durango	2–1	Rayo Cantabria	18:30
Pozoblanco	2–2	Utebo	19:00
Jerez	0–1	San Fernando	19:00
Mar Menor	0–0	Loja	19:00
Haro	1–2	Izarra	19:00
Almansa	1–1	Real Murcia B	19:00
Langreo	0–0	La Roda	19:30

Away Matches:
28 May 2011
Sestao River	2–0	Tenerife B	16:00 — Agg: 3–0
Sp. Villanueva	5–2	Binissalem	18:00 — Agg: 5–3
Poblense	1–1	Mutilvera	18:00 — Agg: 2–4
Racing B	2–1	Valle de Egüés	18:00 — Agg: 2–1
Anguiano	2–0	Novelda	18:00 — Agg: 2–0
Albacete B	2–1	Arandina	18:00 — Agg: 3–3 // Pen: 1–4
Laudio	2–1	La Nucía	18:30 — Agg: 2–2 (a)
29 May 2011
SD Logroñés	1–1	Granadilla	11:30 — Agg: 2–1
Real Murcia B	0–1	Almansa	11:30 — Agg: 1–2
Pozuelo Alarcón	3–0	Siete Villas	12:00 — Agg: 4–1
Univ. Oviedo	2–2	Reus Deportiu	12:00 — Agg: 3–3 (a)
Las Palmas At.	2–0	Tuilla	12:00 — Agg: 4–0
Rayo Cantabria	2–1	Durango	12:00 — Agg: 3–3 // Pen: 4–2
Real Zaragoza B	1–1	Mairena	12:00 — Agg: 1–3
Constancia	3–0	Pobla Mafumet	17:00 — Agg: 3–1
Montañesa	1–0	Cartagena La Unión	18:00 — Agg: 2–1
Racing de Ferrol	2–0	Binéfar	18:00 — Agg: 2–1
Villaralbo	0–2	S.S. Reyes	18:00 — Agg: 1–6
Olímpic Xàtiva	2–1	Atl. Malagueño	18:00 — Agg: 4–1
Alhaurín de la Torre	1–0	Racing Villalbés	18:00 — Agg: 2–2 (a)
Izarra	2–0	Haro	18:00 — Agg: 4–1
Utebo	0–1	Pozoblanco	18:00 — Agg: 2–3
Villaviciosa Odón	3–0	Ourense	18:00 — Agg: 3–2
La Roda	2–0	Langreo	18:00 — Agg: 2–0
Gimn. Segoviana	0–0	Arroyo	18:00 — Agg: 2–1
San Fernando	3–1	Jerez	20:00 — Agg: 4–1
Loja	1–0	Mar Menor	21:00 — Agg: 1–0

=== 2nd eliminatory ===
Winners of 1st eliminatory (2nd, 3rd and 4th of group) (27 teams) and losers of 1st eliminatory (1st of group) (9 teams).

Times are UTC+02:00

Home Matches:
4 June 2011
Gimn. Segoviana	2–0	Noja	18:00
Racing B	1–2	Sp. Villanueva	18:00
Arandina	0–0	Costa Cálida	18:30
La Nucía	1–1	Comarca de Níjar	19:30
Sestao River	1–0	Las Palmas At.	19:30
5 June 2011
Mutilvera	0–0	Manacor	11:30
Constancia	1–1	Alhaurín de la Torre	12:00
Mairena	1–3	Alcobendas Sport	12:00
Rayo Cantabria	1–0	Montañesa	12:00
S.S. Reyes	3–1	Cerceda	13:00
Anguiano	0–1	Olímpic Xàtiva	18:00
Izarra	2–1	Racing de Ferrol	18:00
Reus Deportiu	6–0	Náxara	18:00
Villaviciosa Odón	1–1	SD Logroñés	18:00
Almansa	2–0	Lanzarote	19:00
Pozoblanco	0–0	Tudelano	19:00
La Roda	1–0	Pozuelo Alarcón	19:30
Loja	3–2	San Fernando	21:00

Away Matches:
11 June 2011
Las Palmas At.	3–2	Sestao River	13:00 — Agg: 3–3 (a)
Manacor	2–1	Mutilvera	16:00 — Agg: 2–1
Racing de Ferrol	1–1	Izarra	18:00 — Agg: 1–2
Sp. Villanueva	0–1	Racing B	18:00 — Agg: 2–2 (a)
Comarca de Níjar	0–0	La Nucía	19:30 — Agg: 1–1 (a)
12 June 2011
Alcobendas Sport	0–1	Mairena	12:00 — Agg: 3–2
Alhaurín de la Torre	1–0	Constancia	12:00 — Agg: 2–1
Costa Cálida	0–2	Arandina	12:00 — Agg: 0–2
Lanzarote	2–1	Almansa	12:00 — Agg: 2–3
Pozuelo Alarcón	2–1	La Roda	12:00 — Agg: 2–2 (a)
Tudelano	2–0	Pozoblanco	12:00 — Agg: 2–0
Cerceda	1–0	S.S. Reyes	18:00 — Agg: 2–3
Montañesa	1–0	Rayo Cantabria	18:00 — Agg: 1–1 // Pen: 3–1
Náxara	0–2	Reus Deportiu	18:00 — Agg: 0–8
Noja	4–2	Gimn. Segoviana	18:00 — Agg: 4–4 (a)
Olímpic Xàtiva	1–1	Anguiano	18:00 — Agg: 2–1
SD Logroñés	2–1	Villaviciosa Odón	18:00 — Agg: 3–2
San Fernando	4–0	Loja	20:00 — Agg: 6–3

=== 3rd eliminatory ===
Winners of 2nd eliminatory.

Times are UTC+02:00

Home Matches:
18 June 2010
Gimn. Segoviana	0–1	SD Logroñés	18:00
La Roda	3–0	San Fernando	18:00
Arandina	1–0	Alcobendas Sport	19:00
Almansa	2–1	Manacor	20:00
19 June 2010
S.S. Reyes	2–1	Tudelano	12:00
Izarra	1–2	Olímpic Xàtiva	18:00
Reus Deportiu	2–0	Comarca de Níjar	18:00
Sestao River	2–1	Montañesa	18:00
Alhaurín de la Torre	0–2	Sp. Villanueva	20:00

Away Matches:
25 June 2010
Comarca de Níjar	0–1	Reus Deportiu	17:00 — Agg: 0–3
Olímpic Xàtiva	2–0	Izarra	18:00 — Agg: 4–1
Manacor	1–0	Almansa	18:30 — Agg: 2–2 (a)
Sp. Villanueva	1–1	Alhaurín de la Torre	19:00 — Agg: 3–1
26 June 2010
Alcobendas Sport	1–2	Arandina	12:00 — Agg: 1–3
Tudelano	0–1	S.S. Reyes	12:00 — Agg: 1–3
Montañesa	2–2	Sestao River	18:00 — Agg: 3–4
SD Logroñés	0–3	Gimn. Segoviana	18:30 — Agg: 1–3
San Fernando	0–1	La Roda	21:00 — Agg: 0–4

- Promoted to Segunda División B:Reus Deportiu, Olímpic Xàtiva, Manacor, Sp. Villanueva, Arandina, S.S. Reyes, Sestao River, Gimn. Segoviana and La Roda

== See also ==
- 2011 Segunda División play-offs
- 2011 Segunda División B play-offs
