= Brian Kgosi Dolamo =

South African footballer

Personal information
- Date of birth: 30 November 1992 (age 33)
- Place of birth: Johannesburg, South Africa
- Position: Midfielder

Team information
- Current team: TTM

Youth career
- Jomo Cosmos
- Mamelodi Sundowns
- Kaizer Chiefs
- Polokwane City

Senior career*
Years	Team	Apps	(Gls)
- Villaviciosa de Odón
2021–	TTM	18	(0)
- * Club domestic league appearances and goals as of 18:04, 1 April 2022 (UTC)

Brian Kgosi Dolamo (born 30 November 1992) is a South African soccer player currently playing as a midfielder for TTM.

== Club career ==
Born in Johannesburg, South Africa, Dolamo started his career with Jomo Cosmos, Mamelodi Sundowns and Kaizer Chiefs, before trialling with Swedish side Djurgården. In 2017, he moved to Spain to sign for Villaviciosa de Odón.

On his return to South Africa he signed for TTM, and scored his first goal for the club in a 2–1 Nedbank Cup win over Cape Town Spurs.

== Career statistics ==
=== Club ===
As of 1 April 2022

Appearances and goals by club, season and competition
Club	Season	League			National Cup		League Cup		Other		Total	
Club	Season	Division	Apps	Goals	Apps	Goals	Apps	Goals	Apps	Goals	Apps	Goals
TTM	2021–22	National First Division	18	0	2 (Note: Appearances in the Nedbank Cup)	1	0	0	0	0	20	1
Career total			18	0	2	1	0	0	0	0	20	1
