= Manolo Sanlúcar (footballer) =

Spanish football manager (born 1972)

Personal information
- Full name: Manuel Real Jiménez
- Date of birth: 18 November 1972 (age 53)
- Place of birth: Bornos, Spain
- Height: 1.69 m (5 ft 7 in)
- Position: Forward

Team information
- Current team: SS Reyes (manager)

Youth career
- Bornense

Senior career*
Years	Team	Apps	(Gls)
1989–1995	Bornense		
1995–1996	Jerez Industrial	29	(10)
1996–1997	San Fernando	9	(4)
1997	Xerez	7	(1)
1997–1999	Sanluqueño		
1999–2001	Puerto Real		
2001–2002	San Fernando	28	(2)
2002–2003	Sanluqueño		
2003–2004	Ciudad de Murcia	14	(3)
2004–2005	Alcalá	33	(13)
2005–2009	Portuense		
2009–2010	Ceuta	10	(2)

Managerial career
- 2010–2011: Bornense
- 2011–2012: Mairena
- 2012–2014: Algeciras
- 2016–2017: Villanovense
- 2017: Murcia
- 2018–2019: Málaga B
- 2019–2021: Ebro
- 2022: Sanluqueño
- 2023–2024: Atlético Paso
- 2024: Helsingør
- 2024–: SS Reyes
- * Club domestic league appearances and goals

Manuel Real Jiménez (born 18 November 1972), known as Manolo Sanlúcar or just Sanlúcar, is a Spanish football manager, who is currently in charge of UD San Sebastián de los Reyes and former player who played as a forward.

== Playing career ==
Sanlúcar was born in Bornos, Cádiz, Andalusia, and began his career with hometown club UD Bornense. He moved to Tercera División side Jerez Industrial CF in 1995, and subsequently played for fellow league team CD San Fernando before joining Xerez CD in Segunda División B in January 1997 and helping them in their promotion to Segunda División.

Sanlúcar would resume his career in the third and fourth tiers, representing Atlético Sanluqueño CF (two stints), Puerto Real CF, San Fernando, Ciudad de Murcia, CD Alcalá, Racing Club Portuense and AD Ceuta, achieving a promotion to the second tier in 2003 with Ciudad Murcia. He retired in 2010, aged 37.

== Managerial career ==
Immediately after retiring, Sanlúcar was appointed manager of his first club Bornense in the Regional Preferente. On 14 July 2011, he took over fourth division side CD Mairena.

On 6 June 2012, after missing out promotion in the play-offs, Sanlúcar was confirmed as manager of fellow fourth tier side Algeciras CF. He achieved promotion in his first season but suffered immediate relegation in his second, and left the club on 23 June 2014.

On 22 March 2016, after more than a year without coaching, Sanlúcar was named at the helm of CF Villanovense in the third division. He led the club to their best-ever finish in the category in the 2016–17 campaign, but after again missing out promotion in the play-offs, he left on 16 June 2017.

On 19 June 2017, Sanlúcar was appointed Real Murcia CF manager. On 2 October, after only one win in seven league matches, he was sacked.

On 18 October 2018, after more than a year of inactivity, Sanlúcar was named in charge of Málaga CF's reserves also in the third tier. Despite suffering relegation, he remained in the category after taking over CD Ebro on 22 June 2019.

Sanlúcar left Ebro on 20 May 2021, and was named at the helm of another club he represented as a player, Atlético Sanluqueño, the following 14 February. He left on a mutual agreement on 9 May 2022, after five winless matches and threatened with relegation in the 2021–22 Primera División RFEF.

On 31 December 2022, Sanlúcar was appointed manager of Segunda Federación side CD Atlético Paso. On July 3, 2024, Danish club FC Helsingør confirmed Sanlúcar as the new head coach of the club that had just been relegated to the Danish 2nd Division. After just 8 games, with 4 wins and 10th place in the table, Helsingør confirmed on September 12, 2024 that they had terminated their collaboration with Sanlúcar. The club's director subsequently stated that the language barrier had been too great, as Sanlúcar only spoke Spanish, while he had found it difficult to settle in Denmark.

== Personal life ==
Sanlúcar's son Antonio is also a footballer and a forward. He too represented Bornense.

== Managerial statistics ==
As of match played 24 October 2026

Managerial record by team and tenure
Team	Nat	From	To	Record								Ref
Team	Nat	From	To	G	W	D	L	GF	GA	GD	Win %	Ref
Bornense	(Spain)	1 July 2010	30 June 2011	30	9	8	13	45	54	−9	30.00	
Mairena	(Spain)	14 July 2011	6 June 2012	40	21	11	8	67	35	+32	52.50	
Algeciras	(Spain)	6 June 2012	23 June 2014	84	32	31	21	114	84	+30	38.10	
Villanovense	(Spain)	22 March 2016	16 June 2017	50	26	12	12	70	45	+25	52.00	
Murcia	(Spain)	19 June 2017	2 October 2017	10	4	4	2	18	10	+8	40.00	
Málaga B	(Spain)	17 October 2018	22 June 2019	30	7	8	15	25	39	−14	23.33	
Ebro	(Spain)	22 June 2019	23 May 2021	58	20	22	16	57	64	−7	34.48	
Sanluqueño	(Spain)	14 February 2022	9 May 2022	13	3	4	6	13	26	−13	23.08	
Atlético Paso	(Spain)	31 December 2022	27 June 2024	55	21	18	16	50	41	+9	38.18	
Helsingør	(Denmark)	3 July 2024	12 September 2024	8	4	1	3	14	7	+7	50.00	
SS Reyes	(Spain)	2 December 2024	Present	69	37	17	15	95	61	+34	53.62	
Career total				447	184	136	127	568	466	+102	41.16	—
