= Álex Blanco =

Álex Blanco (Spanish) or Alex Blanco (Latin America) may refer to:

- Álex Blanco (footballer, born 1998), full name Alejandro Blanco Sánchez, Spanish footballer
- Álex Blanco (footballer, born 2001), full name Alejandro Blanco Olmedo, Spanish footballer
