= Sporting Villanueva Promesas =

Sporting Villanueva
- Full name: Sporting Villanueva Promesas
- Founded: 23 August 1993
- Dissolved: 2012
- Ground: Estadio Municipal, Villanueva del Fresno, Extremadura, Spain
- Capacity: 3,000
- Chairman: (Spain) Jordi García
- 2011–12: 2ªB – Group 4, retired
| Home colours | Away colours |

Sporting Villanueva Promesas was a Spanish football club based in Villanueva del Fresno, in the autonomous community of Extremadura, holding home games at Estadio Municipal de Villanueva del Fresno, with a 3,000-seat capacity.

== History ==
Sporting Villanueva was founded by José María Pérez in 1993 after the disappearance of the main club in Villanueva del Fresno. For a full decade, the team competed in the regional leagues, first reaching the fourth division in 2003–04.

In 2010–11, Sporting finished second in the regular season. In the playoffs, the team consecutively ousted CD Binissalem (5–3 on aggregate), Racing de Santander B (2–2) and Alhaurín de la Torre CF (3–1), thus reaching the third level for the first time ever.

== Season to season ==
| Season | Tier | Division | Place | Copa del Rey |
|---|---|---|---|---|
| 1993–94 | 6 | 1ª Reg. | 1st | |
| 1994–95 | 5 | Reg. Pref. | 12th | |
| 1995–96 | 5 | Reg. Pref. | 4th | |
| 1996–97 | 6 | 1ª Reg. | (R) | |
| 1997–98 | DNP | | | |
| 1998–99 | DNP | | | |
| 1999–2000 | DNP | | | |
| 2000–01 | 6 | 1ª Reg. | 8th | |
| 2001–02 | 5 | Reg. Pref. | 5th | |
| 2002–03 | 5 | Reg. Pref. | 1st | |

| Season | Tier | Division | Place | Copa del Rey |
|---|---|---|---|---|
| 2003–04 | 4 | 3ª | 8th | |
| 2004–05 | 4 | 3ª | 6th | |
| 2005–06 | 4 | 3ª | 4th | |
| 2006–07 | 4 | 3ª | 6th | |
| 2007–08 | 4 | 3ª | 7th | |
| 2008–09 | 4 | 3ª | 12th | |
| 2009–10 | 4 | 3ª | 6th | |
| 2010–11 | 4 | 3ª | 2nd | |
| 2011–12 | 3 | 2ª B | (R) | |

- 1 season in Segunda División B
- 8 seasons in Tercera División

== Current squad ==
The squad is according to official website: www.sportingvillanuevapromesas.com and www.futbolme.com

As of 1 August 2011

Note: Flags indicate national team as defined under FIFA eligibility rules; some limited exceptions apply. Players may hold more than one non-FIFA nationality.

| No. | Pos. | Nation | Player |
|---|---|---|---|
| — | GK | (Spain) ESP | Camacho |
| — | GK | (Spain) ESP | Ferran Alcover (on loan from Pobla de Mafumet) |
| — | GK | (Spain) ESP | Ángel Zapata |
| — | DF | (Spain) ESP | Martínez |
| — | DF | (Spain) ESP | Pérez |
| — | DF | (Spain) ESP | Parra |
| — | DF | (Spain) ESP | Pulido |
| — | DF | (Spain) ESP | Rafita |
| — | DF | (Spain) ESP | Kike Silva |

| No. | Pos. | Nation | Player |
|---|---|---|---|
| — | DF | (Spain) ESP | Sergio Albiol |
| — | MF | (Spain) ESP | Yeyo |
| — | MF | (Spain) ESP | Neftalí |
| — | MF | (Argentina) ARG | Julián Wajnsztejn |
| — | MF | (Spain) ESP | Pibe |
| — | MF | (Spain) ESP | Víctor Vázquez |
| — | FW | (Spain) ESP | Lezaun |
| — | FW | (Spain) ESP | Pino |
| — | FW | (Spain) ESP | Víctor Aguinaco |
