= José Antonio Saravia =

José Antonio Saravia or José Antonio Sarabia (Villanueva del Fresno, Spain, 1785 – Kremenets, now in Ukraine, 2 April 1871) was an officer in the Russian army during the Napoleonic Wars, rising to the rank of general in 1843.

== Biography ==
José Antonio Saravia, born in Spain in obscure circumstances, lived in Russia from about 1812. He became a general of the Russian Army in 1843 and was nominated General Inspector of the Russian Military Academies under the Tsars Nikolai I and Alexander II. He married at Kremenets. Larisa Ivanovna, his wife, and their three children also eventually died in Kremenets.

== Possible brother ==
It seems that he had a younger brother or half-brother named Manuel José Saravia y Perdigos or Manuel José Sarabia y Perdigos (Oliva de la Frontera, Spain, 1790–1852), whose career was very similar, although shorter. He also fought in Spain from the age of 18 (after 1808) against Napoleon, became a lieutenant in a Spanish naval expedition in Napoleonic Denmark, was also integrated into the Russian Army after the 1812 Battle of Borodino, and became a general of the Russian Army in 1824, aged 34. He is reported as dying in 1852, much earlier than José Antonio. (Villanueva del Fresno, where José Antonio was born, and Oliva de la Frontera, where Manuel José was born, are neighbouring villages in the Province of Badajoz, near Olivenza, and there is only a gap of five years between their respective birthdays. The second name of José Antonio was apparently also Perdigos: he was rumoured to have been born to a single mother and adopted by his grandparents, named Perdigos.)

== Further sources ==
- Garcia Moya, Manuel, 2011: "Visión de los viajeros españoles en Rusia" in Cuadernos de Rusística Española nº 7
- Hidalgo, Diego, 1936: José Antonio de Saravia. De estudiante extremeño a General de los Ejércitos del Zar, Madrid, Espasa-Calpe
- José Antonio de Saravia. De estudiante extremeño a General de los Ejércitos del Zar, Sevilla, Editorial Renacimiento, 2008
