= Pedro de Quevedo y Quintano =

Spanish Roman Catholic clergyman and politician

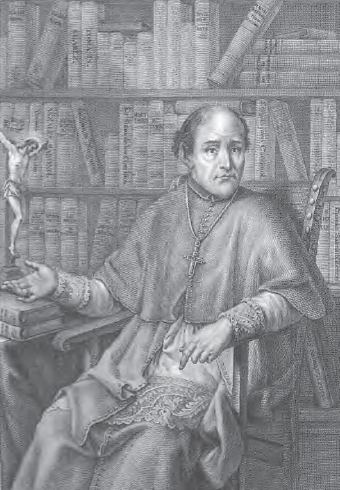
Pedro de Quevedo y Quintano

Pedro Benito Antonio Quevedo y Quintano (Villanueva del Fresno, 1736 – Ourense, 1818) was a Spanish Roman Catholic clergyman and politician.

Named a bishop in 1776, he founded the Seminary of Ourense in 1803, and was one of the five people chosen for the Council of Regency that operated as the executive body of Spain's Supreme Central Junta after Ferdinand VII was deposed during the Peninsular War. He was also, at the time, the last Grand Inquisitor, until the Spanish Inquisition was abolished by the Cortes of Cádiz – which the Supreme Central Junta had established in 1810 to act as a parliamentary Regency. In 1816 Pope Pius VII named him a cardinal.

His sepulchre in the Ourense Cathedral was designed by sculptor Antoni Solà.
