= Estadio Municipal de Villanueva del Fresno =

The Estadio Municipal de Villanueva del Fresno is a football stadium in Villanueva del Fresno, Extremadura, Spain. It is currently used mostly for football matches and was the home ground of Sporting Villanueva Promesas. The stadium holds 3,000.
