= Lucas Ricoy =

Spanish footballer

Personal information
- Full name: Lucas Ricoy Serrano
- Date of birth: 18 January 2003 (age 23)
- Place of birth: Madrid, Spain
- Height: 1.75 m (5 ft 9 in)
- Position: Forward

Team information
- Current team: San Sebastián de los Reyes
- Number: 21

Youth career
- 2012–2014: Villanueva Pardillo
- 2014–2016: Real Madrid
- 2016–2022: Atlético Madrid

Senior career*
Years	Team	Apps	(Gls)
2022–2026	Burgos B	65	(17)
2023–2025	Burgos	4	(0)
2024–2025	→ Móstoles URJC (loan)	20	(7)
2026–	San Sebastián de los Reyes	10	(1)
- * Club domestic league appearances and goals as of 7 May 2026

Lucas Ricoy Serrano (born 18 January 2003) is a Spanish footballer who plays as a forward for Segunda Federación club San Sebastián de los Reyes.

== Career ==
Born in Madrid, Ricoy joined Real Madrid's La Fábrica in 2012, from FC Villanueva del Pardillo. He left the club in 2016, and moved to rivals Atlético Madrid.

In July 2022, after finishing his formation, Ricoy signed for Burgos CF and was assigned to the reserves in Segunda Federación. He made his senior debut on 3 September in a 0–0 home draw against Marino de Luanco, and scored his first goal on 25 September in a 1–1 home draw against Ourense CF.

Ricoy made his first team debut on 8 October 2023, coming on as a second-half substitute for Aitor Córdoba in a 2–1 Segunda División away loss to CD Tenerife. The following 28 August, he moved to CD Móstoles URJC in the fourth division on a one-year loan deal.
