= Gimnástica Segoviana CF =

Spanish football team

Gimnástica Segoviana
- Full name: Gimnástica Segoviana; Club de Fútbol
- Nickname: La Gloriosa
- Founded: 1928
- Ground: La Albuera, Segovia, Castile and León, Spain
- Capacity: 6,000
- President: Agustín Cuenca
- Head coach: Aitor Calle
- League: Segunda Federación – Group 5
- 2025–26: Segunda Federación – Group 1, 6th of 18
- Website: www.gimnasticasegoviana.es
Home colours	Away colours	Third colours

Gimnástica Segoviana Club de Fútbol is a Spanish football team based in Segovia, the capital of the namesake province, in the autonomous community of Castile and León. Founded in 1928 as Sociedad Deportiva Gimnástica Segoviana, it plays in Segunda Federación – Group 5, holding home games at Estadio La Albuera, which has a capacity of 6,000 spectators (5,326 in terrace areas and 674 in the tribunes).

== History ==
On 28 June 1928 the club named S.D. Gimnástica Segoviana was officially created with Francisco del Barrio being elected as its first president.

After playing since its foundation between Tercera División and the Regional leagues, Gimnástica Segoviana promoted to Segunda División B for the first time in 1999, but the club could not remain in the league and was immediately relegated after its first season in the third tier.

In 2011, Gimnástica segoviana repeated success, this time after beating Arroyo CP, SD Noja and SD Logroñés in the promotion play-offs, but again was relegated in the next season. Five years later, the club would come back to the third tier after beating Atlético Malagueño by a huge 4–1 overall in the promotion play-offs.

=== Club background ===
- Sociedad Deportiva Gimnástica Segoviana - (1928–2006)
- Gimnástica Segoviana Club de Fútbol - (2006–)

== Season to season ==
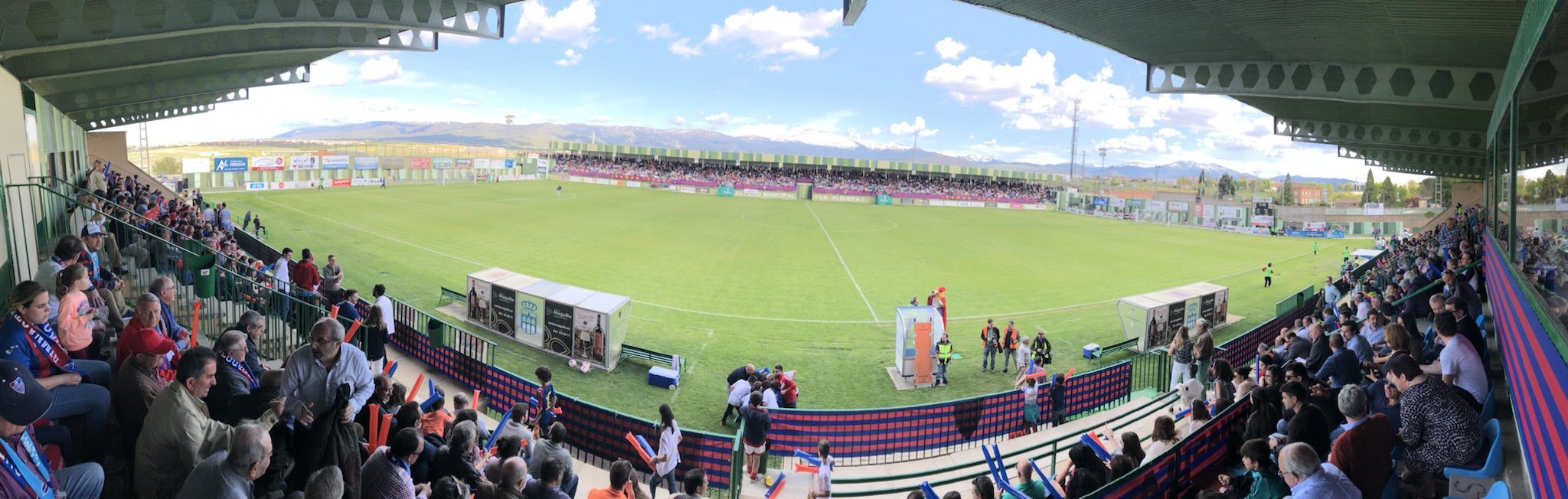
La Albuera, stadium of Gimnástica Segoviana.

Season	Tier	Division	Place	Copa del Rey
1944–45	3	3ª	6th	
1945–46	3	3ª	10th	
1946–47	3	3ª	3rd	
1947–48	3	3ª	6th	Second round
1948–49	3	3ª	13th	Third round
1949–50	DNP			
1950–51	3	3ª	8th	
1951–52	3	3ª	15th	
1952–53	4	1ª Reg.	6th	
1953–54	4	1ª Reg.	13th	
1954–55	3	3ª	7th	
1954–55	3	3ª	7th	
1956–57	3	3ª	9th	
1957–58	3	3ª	17th	
1958–59	4	1ª Reg.	4th	
1959–60	4	1ª Reg.	9th	
1960–61	4	1ª Reg.	3rd	
1961–62	4	1ª Reg.	3rd	
1962–63	3	3ª	10th	
1963–64	3	3ª	6th	

Season	Tier	Division	Place	Copa del Rey
1964–65	3	3ª	5th	
1965–66	3	3ª	4th	
1966–67	3	3ª	15th	
1967–68	3	3ª	3rd	
1968–69	3	3ª	18th	
1969–70	3	3ª	18th	
1970–71	4	1ª Reg.	9th	
1971–72	4	1ª Reg.	13th	
1972–73	4	1ª Reg.	11th	
1973–74	5	1ª Reg.	3rd	
1974–75	4	Reg. Pref.	9th	
1975–76	5	1ª Reg.	4th	
1976–77	4	Reg. Pref.	12th	
1977–78	5	Reg. Pref.	17th	
1978–79	6	1ª Reg.	5th	
1979–80	6	1ª Reg.	2nd	
1980–81	5	Reg. Pref.	8th	
1981–82	5	Reg. Pref.	2nd	
1982–83	4	3ª	17th	
1983–84	4	3ª	11th	

Season	Tier	Division	Place	Copa del Rey
1984–85	4	3ª	7th	
1985–86	4	3ª	5th	
1986–87	4	3ª	10th	First round
1987–88	4	3ª	9th	
1988–89	4	3ª	7th	
1989–90	4	3ª	13th	
1990–91	4	3ª	15th	
1991–92	4	3ª	7th	
1992–93	4	3ª	7th	First round
1993–94	4	3ª	6th	
1994–95	4	3ª	6th	
1995–96	4	3ª	8th	
1996–97	4	3ª	16th	
1997–98	4	3ª	2nd	
1998–99	4	3ª	2nd	
1999–2000	3	2ª B	19th	First round
2000–01	4	3ª	4th	
2001–02	4	3ª	2nd	
2002–03	4	3ª	7th	
2003–04	4	3ª	1st	

Season	Tier	Division	Place	Copa del Rey
2004–05	4	3ª	3rd	Round of 64
2005–06	4	3ª	1st	
2006–07	4	3ª	2nd	Round of 32
2007–08	4	3ª	2nd	
2008–09	4	3ª	8th	
2009–10	4	3ª	8th	
2010–11	4	3ª	3rd	
2011–12	3	2ª B	18th	
2012–13	4	3ª	4th	
2013–14	4	3ª	6th	
2014–15	4	3ª	4th	
2015–16	4	3ª	2nd	
2016–17	4	3ª	1st	
2017–18	3	2ª B	19th	Third round
2018–19	4	3ª	2nd	
2019–20	4	3ª	2nd	First round
2020–21	4	3ª	1st / 1st	First round
2021–22	4	2ª RFEF	13th	First round
2022–23	4	2ª Fed.	5th	
2023–24	4	2ª Fed.	1st	First round

Season	Tier	Division	Place	Copa del Rey
2024–25	3	1ª Fed.	19th	First round
2025–26	4	2ª Fed.	6th	
2026–27	4	2ª Fed.		TBD

- 1 season in Primera Federación
- 3 seasons in Segunda División B
- 5 seasons in Segunda Federación/Segunda División RFEF
- 55 seasons in Tercera División

== Current squad ==
As of 27 September 2025

Note: Flags indicate national team as defined under FIFA eligibility rules; some limited exceptions apply. Players may hold more than one non-FIFA nationality.

No.	Pos.	Nation	Player
1	GK	ESP	Diego Llamazares
2	DF	ESP	Luis Aguado
3	DF	ESP	Liam López
4	DF	ESP	Héctor Espiérrez
5	DF	ESP	Simón Lecea
6	MF	ESP	Rodrigo Ibañes
7	MF	ESP	Jaime Felgueroso
8	MF	ESP	Sergio Orviz
9	FW	ESP	Diego Lorenzo
10	MF	ESP	David Sánchez
11	FW	ESP	David Álvarez
13	GK	ESP	Arnau Rafús
14	MF	ESP	Fernando Llorente
15	FW	URU	Luhe Brun
17	DF	SEN	Samba Gnamadio
19	FW	MEX	Tito Leyva
20	MF	ESP	Izan Chamorro
21	DF	ESP	Alfredo Pedraza
22	DF	ESP	Asier Seijo
23	FW	ESP	Rubén Sanchidrián
24	FW	URU	Enzo Facchin
26	DF	ESP	Pepe
28	FW	ESP	Mario Sanz
30	GK	ESP	Ivan Maroto
31	FW	ESP	Javier Cuenca
32	MF	ESP	Rubén Duque

== Former players ==
- (Albania) Albert Stroni
- (Spain) Quique Estebaranz

== Former coaches ==
- (Spain) Casuco
- (Spain) Abraham García
