= Lourdes Vega =

Spanish chemical engineering scientist

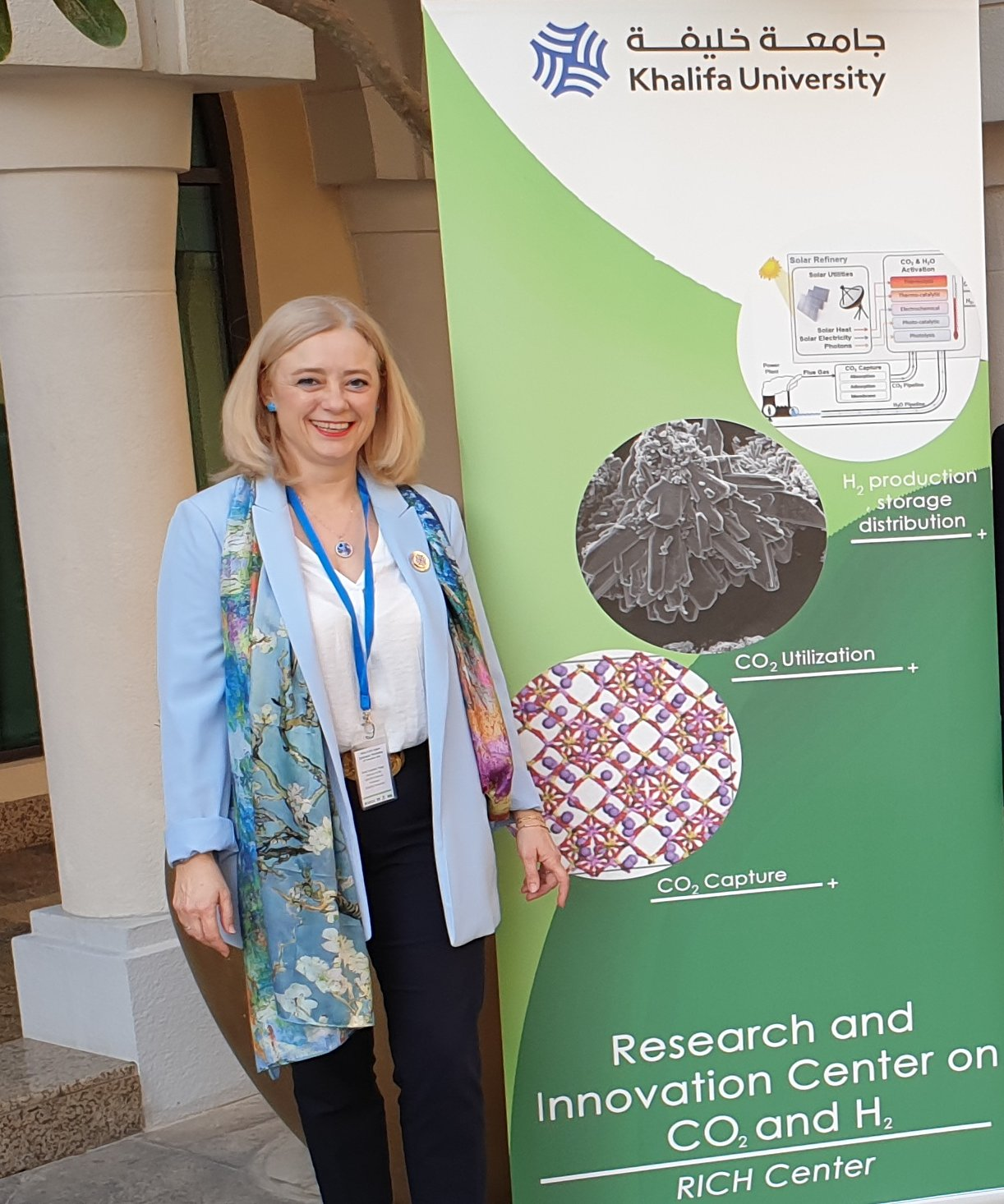
- Lourdes Vega in a congress in Abu Dhabi, December 2019
- Born: 1965 (age 60–61); Villanueva del Fresno, Badajoz
- Education: Ph.D. in Theorical Physics by the University of Seville
- Occupations: Professor of Chemical Engineering and Director of the Research and Innovation Center for CO_{2} and H_{2} (RICH Center) at the Khalifa University, in Abu Dhabi (UAE)i
- Employers: Khalifa University, since 2016; Air Products/Carburos Metálicos, 2007-2015; CSIC-ICMAB, 2003-2007; URV, 1995-2003
- Honours: Mohammed bin Rashid Medal for Scientific Excellence (first non-Arab awardee); Fellow of the American Institute of Chemical Engineers (AIChE); Academic of the Academy of Sciencies of Granada; Academic of the Spanish Royal Academy of Sciences

Lourdes Vega Fernández (Villanueva del Fresno, Badajoz, 1965) is a Spanish scientist, specialist on molecular thermodynamics, clean energy and sustainable products, focused on CO2 capture and utilization, hydrogen production, storage, transportation and utilization, sustainable cooling systems, and water treatment.

== Academic and research information ==
Vega has a Ph.D. in Theorical Physics from the University of Seville (Spain) and she is a professor in Khalifa University (Abu Dhabi, UAE) at the Chemical Engineering department.

She is an expert in molecular modeling and her research in models to predict the thermodynamical behaviour of chemical compounds and the development of new materials to separate gases and contaminants led to a large number of scientific publication in high-impact journals.

Vega was a professor of Chemical Engineering at the University of Rovira i Virgili between 1995 and 2003. Later, she joined the Spanish National Research Council's Institute of Material Science of Barcelona (ICMAB).

In 2017, Vega entered the Academy of Sciences of Granada She is also an elected member of the Mohammed bin Rashid Academy of Scientists

Vega was Global Director of Technology in Agro-Food, Water Treatment and CO_{2} Uses of Air Products, combining that position with that of director of R&D of Carburos Metálicos S.A., and with the direction of the MATGAS R&D center at the Autonomous University of Barcelona. Since 2016 she directs Khalifa University's Research and Development Center for Carbon Dioxide and Hydrogen (RICH).

== Merits, recognitions and distinctions ==
She received the Physics, Innovation and Technology Award in 2013 for “the outstanding, original and creative way in which she has managed to bring theoretical and computational research in statistical physics, a branch of basic physics, to the industrial world.”

She was awarded the United Arab Emirates Medal for Scientific Excellence in 2020 for her work Science for Sustainable Products. She is the first non-Arab person to achieve this distinction

The American Institute of Chemical Engineers elected her as a fellow in 2022. In 2023, Vega entered the Spanish Royal Academy of Sciences as a corresponding member.

She has published more than 370 scientific articles, has 5 patents, and is the author of the popular book on the uses of CO_{2}, whose title is CO2 as a resource. From capture to industrial uses.

Vega is a member of the boards of directors of the chemical company Ercros and water services company Canal de Isabel II
