= Aitor Calle =

Spanish football manager

Personal information
- Full name: Aitor Calle Hernández
- Date of birth: 28 June 1976 (age 50)
- Place of birth: Bilbao, Spain
- Height: 1.85 m (6 ft 1 in)
- Position: Winger

Team information
- Current team: Gimnástica Segoviana (manager)

Youth career
- Salesianos

Senior career*
Years	Team	Apps	(Gls)
1999–2004	Lemona		
2004–2005	Amurrio	27	(2)
2005–2006	Sestao River		
2006–2008	Portugalete		
2008–2009	San Pedro		
2009–2011	Deusto		

Managerial career
- 2011–2017: Deusto
- 2017: Portugalete
- 2018–2021: Haro
- 2021–2024: Sestao River
- 2024–2025: Numancia
- 2025–2026: Sestao River
- 2026–: Gimnástica Segoviana
- * Club domestic league appearances and goals

Aitor Calle Hernández (born 28 June 1976) is a Spanish football coach and a former winger who is the manager of Segunda Federación club Gimnástica Segoviana.

== Playing career ==
Calle was born in Deusto, Bilbao, Biscay, Basque Country, and played youth football for local side CD Salesianos. After first appearing in Tercera División with SD Lemona in 1999, he moved to Segunda División B side Amurrio Club in 2004.

In July 2005, Calle joined Sestao River Club in the fourth division. He moved to fellow league team Club Portugalete in the following year, and subsequently played for SD San Pedro and SD Deusto in the regional leagues, retiring with the latter in 2011 at the age of 34.

== Managerial career ==
Immediately after retiring, Calle became a manager of his last club Deusto, and led the side to a promotion to the fourth division in 2015. He left the club on 22 May 2017 to take over another club he represented as a player, Portugalete.

Calle was sacked by Portu on 6 October 2017, and was named at the helm of Haro Deportivo the following 13 June. He led the club to a promotion to the third tier in his first season, suffering relegation in his third.

On 23 June 2021, after previously agreeing to become a manager of CD Laredo, Calle was announced in charge of Sestao in Segunda División RFEF. He led the club to a promotion to Primera Federación in 2023.

Calle left Sestao on 17 June 2024, and was named at the helm of CD Numancia in the fourth tier three days later. The following 17 June, Calle left Numancia after failing to get them promoted via the play-offs.

== Managerial statistics ==
As of 27 October 2026

Managerial record by team and tenure
Team	Nat	From	To	Record								Ref
Team	Nat	From	To	G	W	D	L	GF	GA	GD	Win %	Ref
Deusto	(Spain)	30 June 2011	22 May 2017	212	80	76	56	264	220	+44	37.74	
Portugalete	(Spain)	22 May 2017	6 October 2017	6	2	1	3	7	6	+1	33.33	
Haro	(Spain)	13 June 2018	23 June 2021	98	48	23	27	157	89	+68	48.98	
Sestao River	(Spain)	23 June 2021	17 June 2024	112	53	35	24	152	93	+59	47.32	
Numancia	(Spain)	20 June 2024	17 June 2025	39	20	11	8	57	27	+30	51.28	
Sestao River	(Spain)	27 June 2025	8 March 2026	26	10	9	7	29	25	+4	38.46	
Gimnástica Segoviana	(Spain)	28 May 2026	Present	9	2	4	3	14	14	+0	22.22	
Total				502	215	159	128	680	474	+206	42.83	—
