= Álex Blanco (footballer, born 2001) =

Spanish footballer

Personal information
- Full name: Alejandro Blanco Olmedo
- Date of birth: 15 October 2001 (age 25)
- Place of birth: Fuenlabrada, Spain
- Positions: Right-back; winger

Team information
- Current team: SS Reyes
- Number: 2

Youth career
- 2013–2014: La Avanzada
- 2014–2015: Fuenlabrada
- 2015–2019: La Avanzada

Senior career*
Years	Team	Apps	(Gls)
2019–2020	La Avanzada	23	(0)
2020–2021	Fuenlabrada B	11	(0)
2021–2023	Fuenlabrada Promesas	62	(9)
2021–2023	Fuenlabrada	1	(0)
2023–2025	Unión Adarve	59	(2)
2025–	SS Reyes	31	(2)
- * Club domestic league appearances and goals as of 7 May 2026

Alejandro "Álex" Blanco Olmedo (born 15 October 2001) is a Spanish footballer who plays as either a right-back or a right winger for Segunda Federación club SS Reyes .

== Club career ==
Born in Fuenlabrada, Madrid, Blanco represented CD La Avanzada and CF Fuenlabrada as a youth, before making his senior debut with the former's first team during the 2019–20 campaign, in the regional leagues. In 2020, he returned to Fuenla and was assigned to the reserves in the fifth tier.

For the 2021–22 season, Blanco was assigned to Fuenlabrada's new reserve team CF Fuenlabrada Promesas Madrid 2021 in the Tercera División RFEF. He made his first team – and professional – debut on 3 November 2021, starting in a 1–2 away loss against UD Las Palmas in the Segunda División.
