= UD San Sebastián de los Reyes =

Coordinates: 40.545485°N 3.616337°W

SS Reyes
- Full name: Unión Deportiva; San Sebastián de los Reyes
- Nickname: Sanse
- Founded: 1971; 55 years ago
- Ground: Nuevo Matapiñonera, San Sebastián de los Reyes, Madrid, Spain
- Capacity: 3,000
- President: Miguel Espinosa
- Head coach: Manolo Sanlúcar
- League: Segunda Federación – Group 5
- 2025–26: Segunda Federación – Group 5, 2nd of 18
- Website: www.ud-sanse.com
Home colours	Away colours

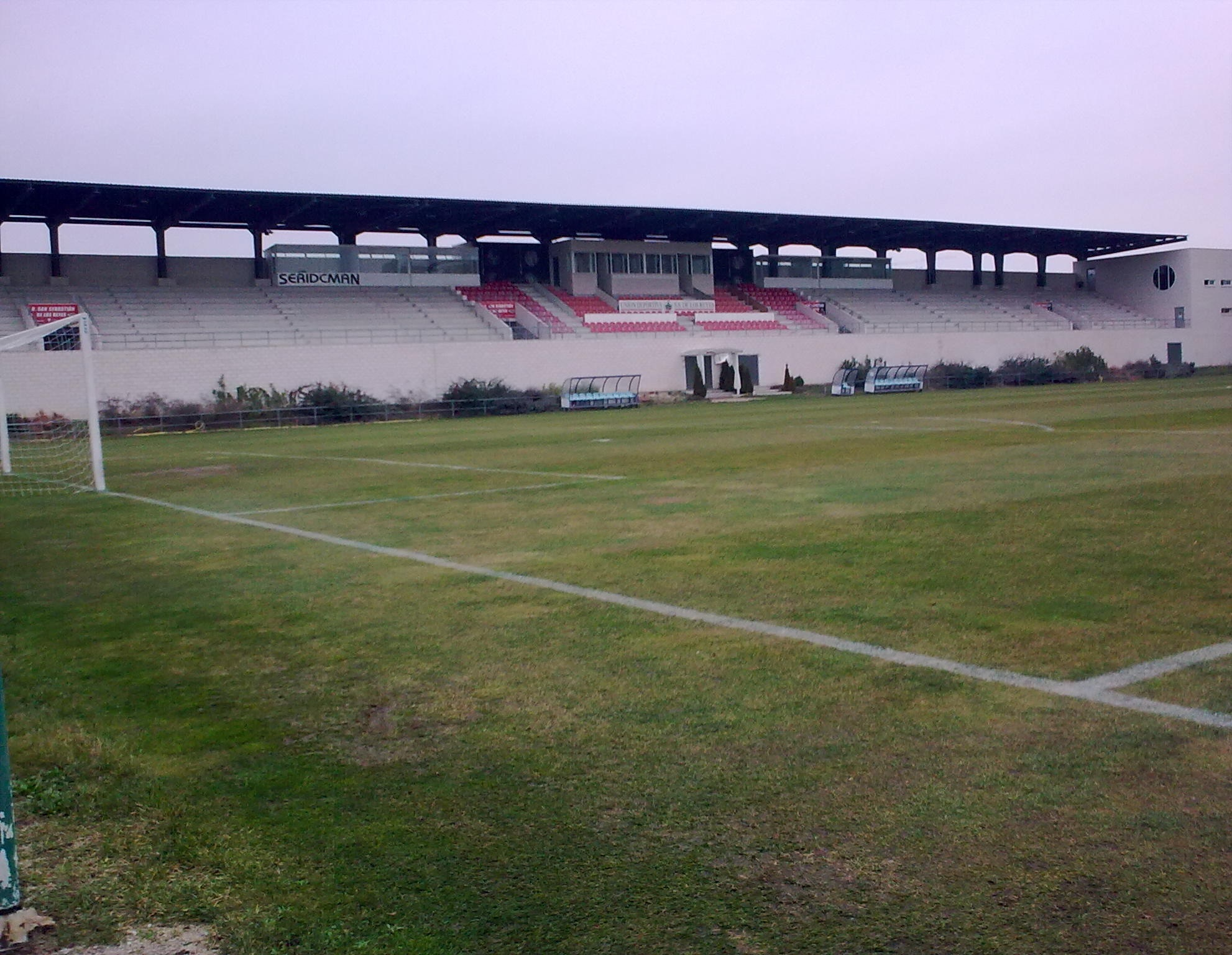
Nuevo Matapiñonera Stadium.

Unión Deportiva San Sebastián de los Reyes, also known as Sanse, is a Spanish football team based in San Sebastián de los Reyes, in the autonomous community of Madrid. Founded in 1971 it plays in Segunda Federación – Group 5, holding home matches at Estadio Nuevo Matapiñonera, with a capacity of 3,000 seats.

== History ==
The club was founded in 1971. After several years in the lower divisions of Madrid, the club debuted in Tercera División in the 1985–86 season.

== Season to season ==
Season	Tier	Division	Place	Copa del Rey
1971–72	8	3ª Reg.	13th	
1972–73	8	3ª Reg.	4th	
1973–74	7	3ª Reg. P.	11th	
1974–75	7	3ª Reg. P.	7th	
1975–76	6	2ª Reg.	7th	
1976–77	6	2ª Reg.	1st	
1977–78	6	1ª Reg.	15th	
1978–79	7	2ª Reg.	3rd	
1979–80	7	2ª Reg.	2nd	
1980–81	6	1ª Reg.	5th	
1981–82	6	1ª Reg.	2nd	
1982–83	5	Reg. Pref.	9th	
1983–84	5	Reg. Pref.	8th	
1984–85	5	Reg. Pref.	2nd	
1985–86	4	3ª	13th	
1986–87	4	3ª	7th	
1987–88	3	2ª B	13th	
1988–89	3	2ª B	16th	First round
1989–90	4	3ª	7th	
1990–91	4	3ª	13th	First round

Season	Tier	Division	Place	Copa del Rey
1991–92	4	3ª	16th	
1992–93	4	3ª	4th	
1993–94	3	2ª B	10th	
1994–95	3	2ª B	6th	Third round
1995–96	3	2ª B	17th	First round
1996–97	4	3ª	6th	
1997–98	4	3ª	4th	
1998–99	3	2ª B	14th	Third round
1999–2000	3	2ª B	6th	
2000–01	3	2ª B	18th	Round of 32
2001–02	4	3ª	1st	
2002–03	4	3ª	1st	Round of 64
2003–04	3	2ª B	13th	Round of 64
2004–05	3	2ª B	14th	
2005–06	3	2ª B	10th	
2006–07	3	2ª B	6th	
2007–08	3	2ª B	19th	First round
2008–09	4	3ª	13th	
2009–10	4	3ª	13th	
2010–11	4	3ª	4th	

Season	Tier	Division	Place	Copa del Rey
2011–12	3	2ª B	14th	
2012–13	3	2ª B	17th	
2013–14	4	3ª	4th	
2014–15	4	3ª	6th	
2015–16	4	3ª	1st	
2016–17	3	2ª B	16th	First round
2017–18	3	2ª B	9th	
2018–19	3	2ª B	8th	
2019–20	3	2ª B	20th	Second round
2020–21	3	2ª B	1st / 2nd	
2021–22	3	1ª RFEF	10th	Second round
2022–23	3	1ª Fed.	17th	
2023–24	4	2ª Fed.	2nd	
2024–25	4	2ª Fed.	8th	First round
2025–26	4	2ª Fed.	2nd	
2026–27	4	2ª Fed.		TBD

- 2 seasons in Primera Federación/Primera División RFEF
- 19 seasons in Segunda División B
- 4 seasons in Segunda Federación
- 16 seasons in Tercera División

== Honours ==
- Tercera División
  - Champions (3): 2001–02, 2002–03, 2015–16

== Players ==
=== Current squad ===
As of 8 February 2026.

Note: Flags indicate national team as defined under FIFA eligibility rules; some limited exceptions apply. Players may hold more than one non-FIFA nationality.

No.	Pos.	Nation	Player
1	GK	ESP	David Alguacil
2	DF	ESP	Álex Blanco
3	DF	ESP	Jesús Ocaña
4	DF	FRA	Robin Lafarge
5	DF	ESP	Aarón Palomo
6	MF	ESP	Pablo Olivares
7	FW	ESP	Miguel Garcí
8	MF	ESP	Mario González
9	FW	ESP	Fernando Harta
11	FW	ESP	Christian Díaz
13	GK	ESP	Alberto Lejárraga

No.	Pos.	Nation	Player
14	MF	ESP	Javi Robles
15	DF	ESP	César Llopis
17	FW	ESP	Fer Ruiz
19	MF	ESP	Eneko Capilla
20	DF	GEQ	Marvin Anieboh
21	FW	ESP	Lucas Ricoy
30	FW	ESP	Yael Santana (Academy)
23	MF	ESP	Ale Galindo
26	DF	ESP	Iván García
37	GK	ESP	Gonzalo Acevedo

=== Reserve team ===
Note: Flags indicate national team as defined under FIFA eligibility rules; some limited exceptions apply. Players may hold more than one non-FIFA nationality.

No.	Pos.	Nation	Player
25	GK	ESP	Gonzalo Acevedo
26	MF	ESP	Iván García

No.	Pos.	Nation	Player
27	MF	ESP	Jacobo de Oro
28	FW	ESP	Axel García
