= José Ramón (footballer, born 1987) =

Spanish footballer

Personal information
- Full name: José Ramón Rodríguez Gómez
- Date of birth: 17 July 1987 (age 39)
- Place of birth: Huelva, Spain
- Height: 1.86 m (6 ft 1 in)
- Position: Goalkeeper

Team information
- Current team: Calahorra

Youth career
- Recreativo

Senior career*
Years	Team	Apps	(Gls)
2005–2008	Recreativo B		
2006–2008	Recreativo	1	(0)
2007–2008	→ Cultural Leonesa (loan)	9	(0)
2008–2009	Celta B	2	(0)
2009–2010	Écija	33	(0)
2010–2012	San Roque	32	(0)
2013	Noja	11	(0)
2013–2014	Lucena	34	(0)
2014–2015	Barakaldo	5	(0)
2015–	Calahorra	29	(0)
- * Club domestic league appearances and goals as of 12 June 2016

José Ramón "Txerra" Rodríguez Gómez (born 17 July 1987), commonly known as José Ramón, is a Spanish footballer who plays for CD Calahorra as a goalkeeper.

== Club career ==
Born in Huelva, Andalusia, José Ramón finished his formation with local Recreativo de Huelva, making his senior debuts with the reserves in the 2005–06 season. On 18 June 2006 he played his first game as a professional, starting in a 2–0 away win against Hércules CF in the Segunda División.

In the following years José Ramón played in Segunda División B, representing Cultural y Deportiva Leonesa, Celta de Vigo B, Écija Balompié, CD San Roque de Lepe, SD Noja, Lucena CF and Barakaldo CF.
