= AD Villaviciosa de Odón =

Spanish football team

Villaviciosa de Odón
- Full name: Agrupación Deportiva Villaviciosa de Odón
- Founded: 1971; 55 years ago
- Ground: Nuevo Municipal, Villaviciosa de Odón, Com. Madrid, Spain
- Capacity: 3,000
- Chairman: (Spain) Raúl Muñóz
- Manager: (Spain) Fernando Lopez "Nano"
- League: Primera Autonómica de Aficionados – Group 2
- 2024–25: Primera Autonómica de Aficionados – Group 2, 5th of 18
Home colours	Away colours

Agrupación Deportiva Villaviciosa de Odón is a Spanish football team from Villaviciosa de Odón, in the Community of Madrid. Founded in 1971, they currently play in Primera Autonómica de Aficionados – Group 2.

== Season to season ==
Season	Tier	Division	Place	Copa del Rey
1971–72	7	3ª Reg.	14th	
1972–73	7	3ª Reg.	12th	
1973–74	8	3ª Reg.	(W)	
1974–75	8	3ª Reg.	7th	
1975–76	8	3ª Reg.	1st	
1976–77	7	3ª Reg. P.	1st	
1977–78	7	2ª Reg.	3rd	
1978–79	7	2ª Reg.	2nd	
1979–80	6	1ª Reg.	15th	
1980–81	7	2ª Reg.	14th	
1981–82	8	3ª Reg. P.	10th	
1982–83	7	2ª Reg.	6th	
1983–84	7	2ª Reg.	11th	
1984–85	7	2ª Reg.	2nd	
1985–86	6	1ª Reg.	4th	
1986–87	5	Reg. Pref.	11th	
1987–88	5	Reg. Pref.	12th	
1988–89	5	Reg. Pref.	5th	
1989–90	5	Reg. Pref.	11th	
1990–91	5	Reg. Pref.	7th	

Season	Tier	Division	Place	Copa del Rey
1991–92	5	Reg. Pref.	13th	
1992–93	5	Reg. Pref.	4th	
1993–94	5	Reg. Pref.	10th	
1994–95	5	Reg. Pref.	5th	
1995–96	5	Reg. Pref.	4th	
1996–97	5	Reg. Pref.	3rd	
1997–98	5	Reg. Pref.	2nd	
1998–99	4	3ª	16th	
1999–2000	4	3ª	20th	
2000–01	5	Reg. Pref.	17th	
2001–02	6	1ª Reg.	3rd	
2002–03	6	1ª Reg.	2nd	
2003–04	5	Reg. Pref.	16th	
2004–05	6	1ª Reg.	2nd	
2005–06	5	Reg. Pref.	10th	
2006–07	5	Reg. Pref.	1st	
2007–08	4	3ª	19th	
2008–09	5	Reg. Pref.	5th	
2009–10	5	Pref.	3rd	
2010–11	4	3ª	2nd	

Season	Tier	Division	Place	Copa del Rey
2011–12	4	3ª	14th	
2012–13	4	3ª	17th	
2013–14	5	Pref.	6th	
2014–15	5	Pref.	6th	
2015–16	5	Pref.	5th	
2016–17	5	Pref.	8th	
2017–18	5	Pref.	10th	
2018–19	5	Pref.	7th	
2019–20	5	Pref.	15th	
2020–21	5	Pref.	2nd	
2021–22	5	3ª RFEF	18th	
2022–23	6	Pref.	6th	
2023–24	6	Pref.	8th	
2024–25	6	1ª Aut.	5th	
2025–26	6	1ª Aut.		

- 6 seasons in Tercera División
- 1 season in Tercera División RFEF

== Uniform ==
- Uniform holder T-shirt, trousers and half white
- Uniform alternative T-shirt, trousers and half blue

== Stadium ==
Their home stadium is the Estadio Nuevo Municipal, which seats 10,000 spectators.

== Current squad ==
Note: Flags indicate national team as defined under FIFA eligibility rules; some limited exceptions apply. Players may hold more than one non-FIFA nationality.

No.	Pos.	Nation	Player
—	MF	CMR	Jerry Kamgang
—	FW	COL	Fabián Osorio
—	MF	CIV	Gnonka Lago
—	MF	LBR	James Zortiah
—	MF	ROU	Catalin Onofrei
—	DF	MAR	Muhsin El Yazidi
—	GK	ESP	Carlos
—	GK	ESP	Pope
—	DF	ESP	Dani Castillo
—	DF	ESP	Alex Diez

No.	Pos.	Nation	Player
—	DF	ESP	Javi García
—	DF	ESP	Loren
—	DF	ESP	Marchena
—	DF	ESP	Mario
—	DF	ESP	Mauri
—	DF	ESP	Sergio
—	MF	ESP	Diego de Pedro
—	MF	ESP	Garci
—	MF	ESP	Raúl Obispo
—	FW	ESP	Marko

== International players ==
- (Equatorial Guinea) Evuy (2009–2012)
