= Villanueva del Fresno =

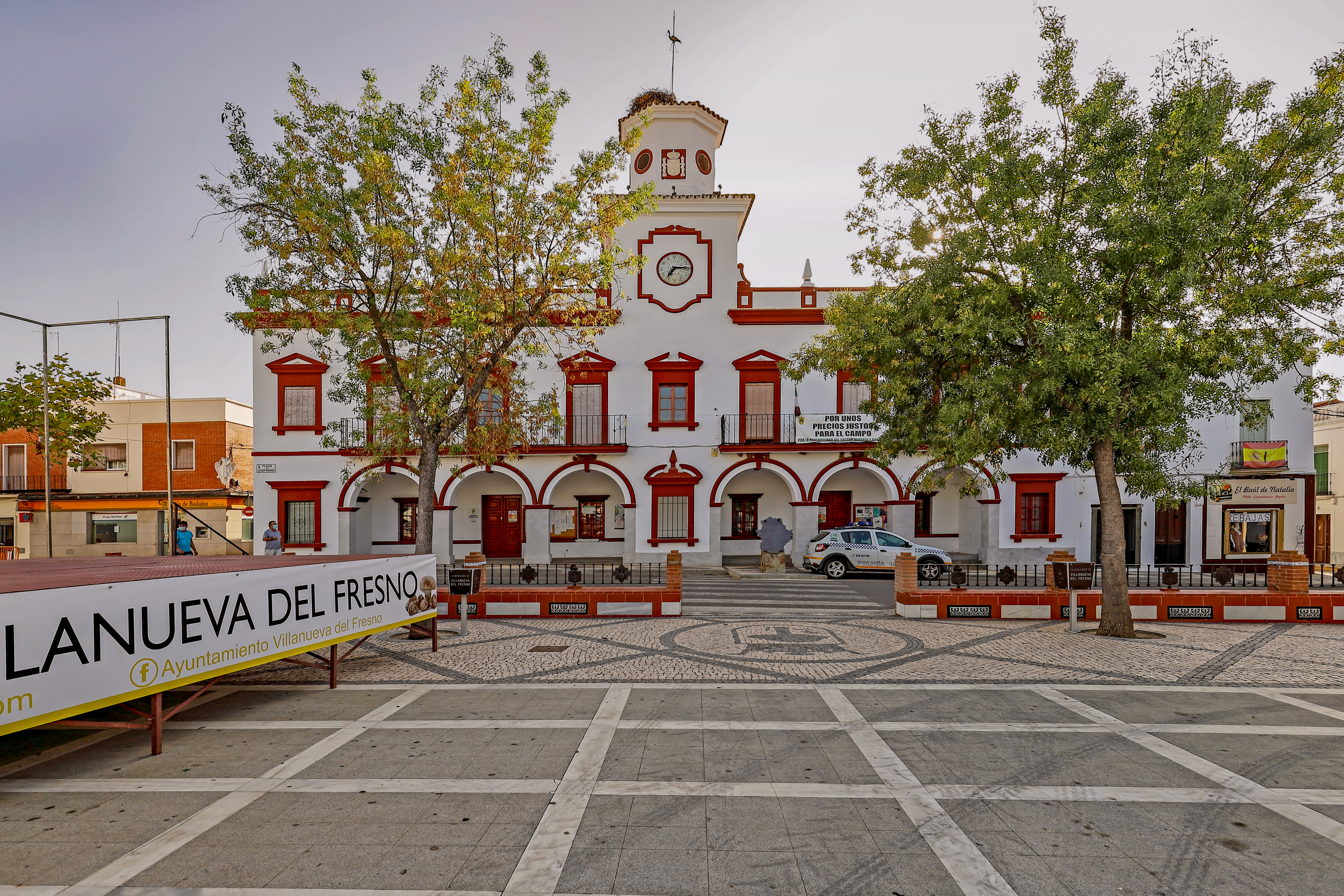

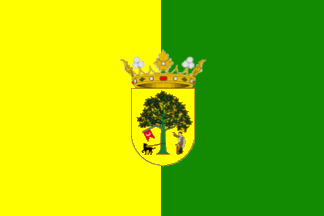
- Flag Coat of arms

- Location of Villanueva del Fresno in Extremadura Location of Villanueva del Fresno in Spain.
- Coordinates: 38°23′N 07°10′W
- Country: Spain
- Autonomous community: Extremadura
- Province: Badajoz
- Comarca: Llanos de Olivenza

Government
  - Alcalde: Ramón Díaz Farias (PSOE-E)

Area
  - Total: 360 km^{2} (140 sq mi)
- Elevation: 256 m (840 ft)

Population (2025-01-01)
  - Total: 3,247
  - Density: 9.0/km^{2} (23/sq mi)
- Time zone: UTC+1 (CET)
  - Summer (DST): UTC+2 (CEST)
- Website: villanuevadelfresno.es

Villanueva del Fresno is a town in Badajoz Province in Extremadura, Spain.

Villanueva del Fresno is the southernmost town of the district of Olivenza and also one of the closest to the Portuguese border, with which it has extensive commercial contacts.

== History ==
People have lived in the Guadiana Valley since prehistoric times, with Paleolithic and Neolithic traces uncovered. The area's most important archaeological relic is a primitive, probably Islamic, settlement known as Cunco Castle, situated between the Ribeira de Cuncos and the Guadiana River. Probably, earlier settlements underlay the site.

The area was contested during the Reconquest, and later during Portugal's struggle for independence from the dual monarchy with the kings of Castille-Leon, during which it was renamed "Vila Nova de Portugal." In the late thirteenth century, the current Villanueva del Fresno was part of bayliato Templar Jerez de los Caballeros, until the pope dissolved the Knights Templar in 1312. In 1332, king Alfonso XI gave his mayordomo, Martin Fernandez Portocarrero, extensive lands surrounding the town. He married the daughter of another aristocrat, and their progeny became known as the Lords of Moguer and Villanueva del Fresno. The Portocarrero family became one of the most distinguished in Spain, and in 1530 Charles V, the Holy Roman Emperor named Juan Portocarrero the Marquise of Villanueva del Fresno. Descendants served in Spain and the colonies and were recognized as grandees of Spain (as Dukes of Alba). The Castilian monarchs recognized the town as independent (and supplying its own troops). The Tower of Homage was built as an addition to the castle during the fourteenth century, to ensure both the town's defence and this part of the border. The Portuguese attacked Villanueva on several occasions, most of which were repulsed. In 1643, a Portuguese army commanded by Mathías of Albuquerque took the town and castle after a long siege. Both were razed in 1646 during the Portuguese Restoration War.

Reconstruction began about 25 years later, after the Treaty of Lisbon (1668). The "new" town was built on the other side of the hill from the original settlement, and that, like in the neighbouring town of Chelan, most of the new townspeople were Portuguese. The rebuilt town was designed with broad streets and plot lines which survive to the present day.

== Population growth ==
Population growth of Villanueva del Fresno between 1900 y 2007
1900	1910	1920	1930	1940	1950	1960
4393	4692	5387	6430	6535	6585	6621
1970	1981	1991	1996	1999	2007	
4253	3469	3295	3449	3522	3610	

== Architecture and attractions ==
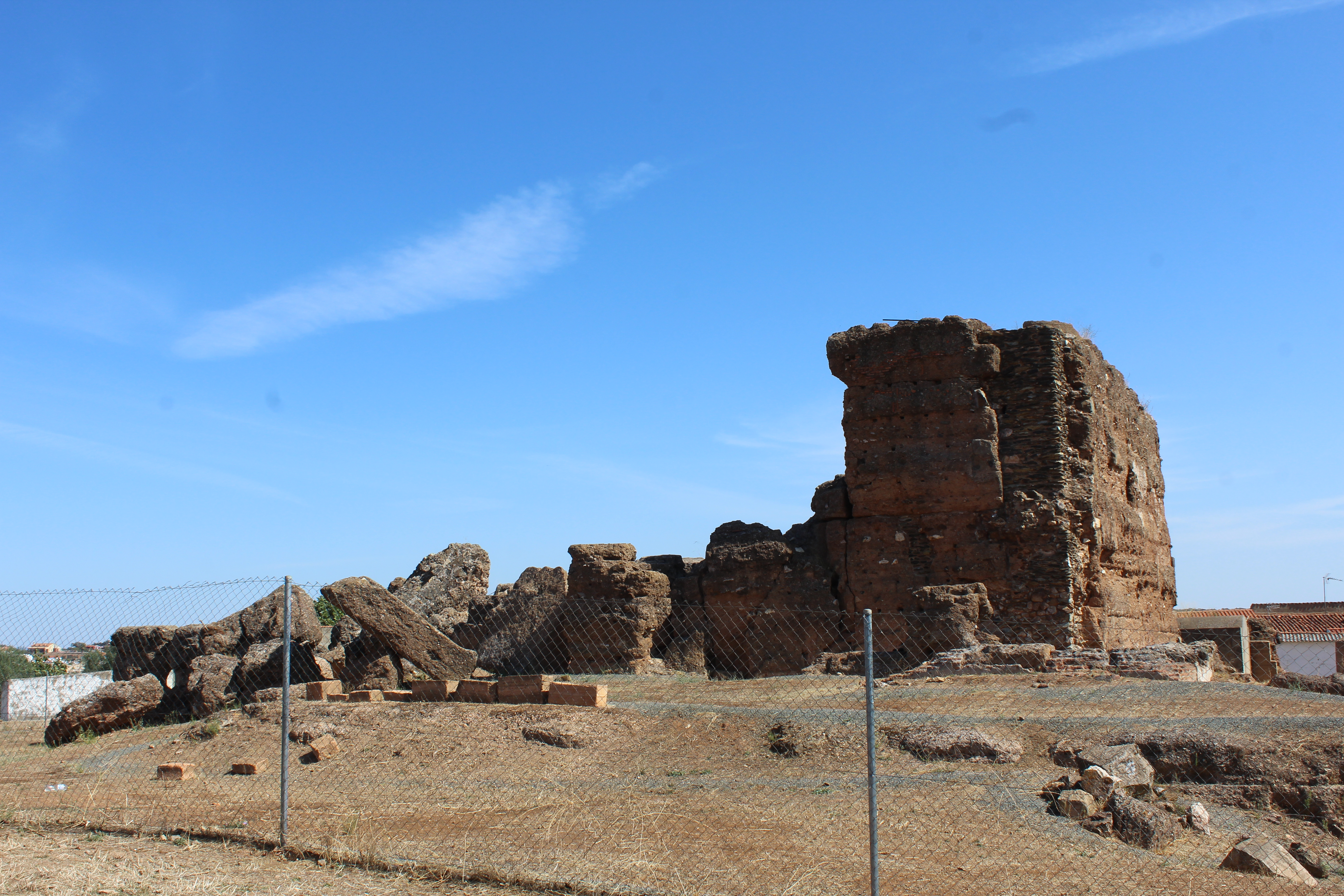
Castle

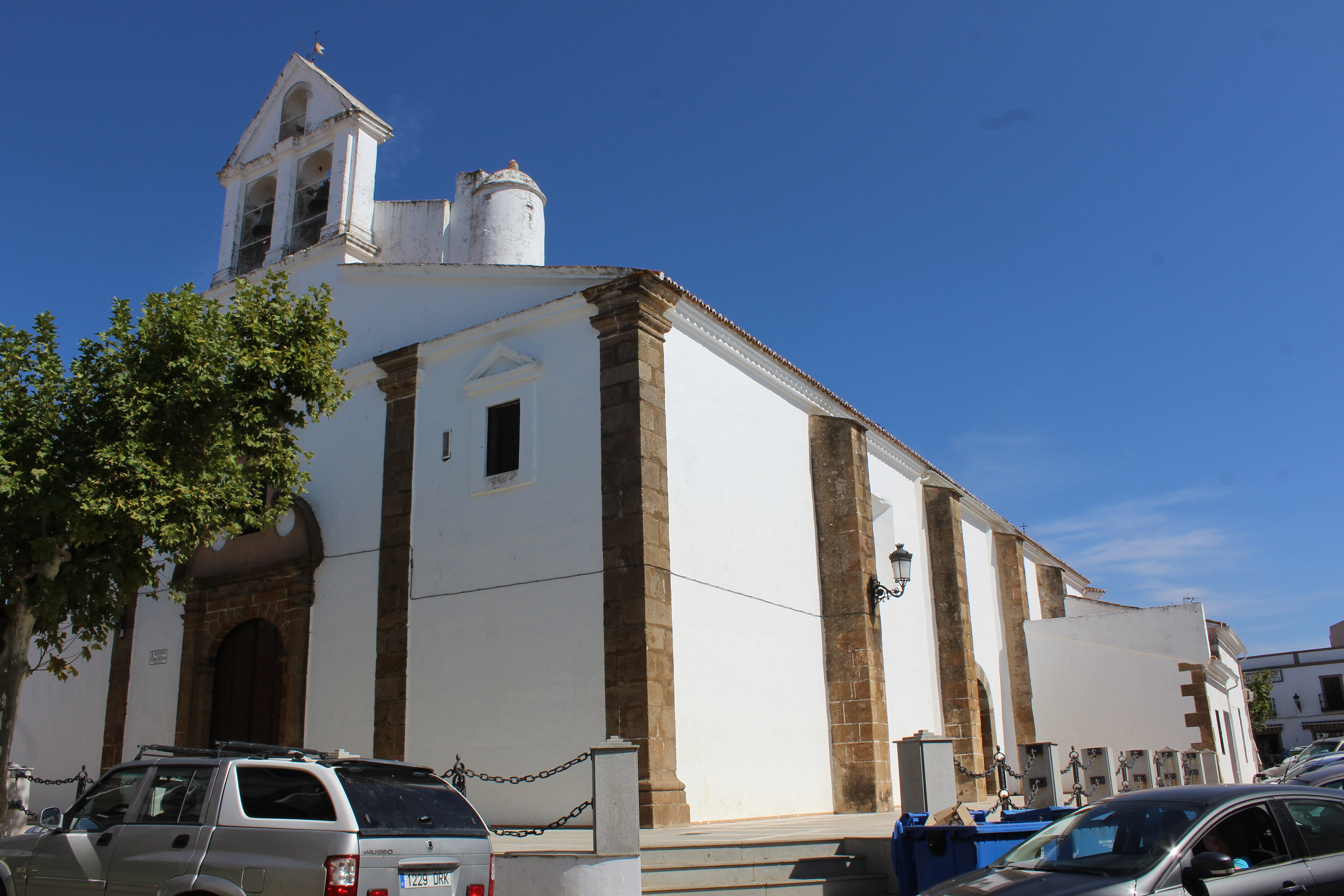
Church

Only ruins remain of the fortress which once gave the town its strategic significance. The area between the surviving walls has been converted into an open-air amphitheater. This particular fortress was built in the fifteenth century with a powerful walled perimeter and keep with high fixed towers, but was destroyed two centuries later.

The 17th-century town has many traditional, sun-bleached two-story houses, especially on the streets Hilario Lopez, Nueva, San Juanito, Portocarrero, San Gínes and Holy Spirit (Pablo Iglesias). Some façades are ornamented by trellises, portals and balconies that give an air very peculiar to the locality. The Plaza de España is the town's traditional center, with the town council's historic building and the parish church (Our Lady of the Conception replacing Nuestra Senora de las Estrellas) comprising two sides. The plaza is noteworthy both for its large size and openness. Other historic sites include the Pilar del Conde and de la Mora, three hermitages (San Antonio, San Gínes de la Jara and Cristo de la Expiracion), aqueduct remains near the former convent of Nuestra Senora de la Luz and a restored medieval fortress in and a 17th-century bridge en route to nearby Alconchel.

Within its municipal area is the farm "High and Low Goat" of 2,688 hectares that the Board of Extremadura expropriated in 1990 from the Duchess of Alba and delivered to commoners from the nearby town of Zahínos.

The area also has natural features which have become tourist attractions for hikers, hunters and fisherman. Nearby wildlife areas include the Rio Alcarrache biodiversity corridor (with eagle owls, black storks and wildcats among the rare protected species) and the Sierra de Jerez bird protection area (very important overwintering area for storks and other northern European species). Two large hydroelectric dams have been built in the area, with reservoirs at Cunco and Aquelva (in Portugal). Fishing is permitted in the reservoirs, and observation areas have also been constructed.

== Eating out ==
The area's gastronomy features Iberian ham, lamb and rabbit in the style of Villaneuva. Wild edible mushrooms are collected in the fields surrounding Villanueva del Fresno, including parasols, gurumelos and boletus edulis.

== Local celebration days ==
Carnival is at the beginning of Lent and thus its date will depend on the date of Ash Wednesday. The carnival starts on the Friday evening before Ash Wednesday with a procession through the streets with people in costumes and disguises 'frightening' anybody they meet. On Saturday, the big day, again there is an evening procession through the streets to the football stadium where the singing groups congregate. These groups then process through the town until they arrive at the Plaza de España where they sing their, usually amusing and/or satirical, songs called comparsas, the same name is used for the groups which sing them. Then on Sunday there is another evening procession of the adult and children's singing groups, again disguised or in costume. On Shrove Tuesday evening, after a further street procession, there is the ceremony of the Burial of the Sardine. This involves the burning of a symbolic article and signifies the end of the carnival celebration.

The Gurumelo Food Festival This occurs one weekend in March, close to the 19th, Father's Day in Spain. Gurumelos are edible mushroom-like fungi. It brings together neighbours in a gastronomic and handicrafts fair.

St. Ginés de la Jara Romeria This festival, celebrating the patron saint of the town, takes place on the first Monday in May. It is usual to spend the day in the country around the area of the St. Ginés hermitage. The day begins with a fanfare from the town band and the firing of exploding rockets. At 10.00 hrs there is a procession and competition of decorated carriages around the Plaza de España. The romeria passes through land which is part of the San Ginés estate. A mass is celebrated in the San Ginés hermitage at midday. This is followed by a procession around the area of the hermitage livened up by music from the municipal band. After that comes the presentation of the prizes for the decorated carriages and when all the religious ceremony has finished the party/picnic begins and lasts well into the night.

Feast of the Virgin of Fatima on 13 May.

Feast of St. Juanito on 24 June.

Feast of St. Christopher (for drivers) held in the middle of August. An open-air mass is held at 21.00hrs in honour of St. Christopher followed by a vehicle procession and finally a blessing of the vehicles.

Fair and Festival of St. Gínes de la Jara at the end of August, the main day being the 25th. The fair and festival last for 5 days during which there are activities for children in the Plaza de España.

The Feast of Holy Christ of the Expiration on 14 September. The celebration starts on 3 September with the transfer of the image of Christ from the hermitage to the parish church in preparation for the novena which starts the following morning. On the 14th at midday there is a tasting of sangria in the porch of the church. In the evening the statue of Christ is brought out of the church and processed back to the hermitage where it is met by a statue of the Virgin of Solitude (La Virgen de Soledad) who goes in procession to the parish church where the next day a triduum is performed in her honour.

Extremadura Day held on 7 September.

Feast of the Gamona is a local tradition that is carried out on New Year's Eve. Before the family meal many people, mostly younger, build bonfires and burn faggots of the dried stems of plants locally called St. Joseph's Wands, (varitas de San José or gamonas). The origin and meaning of this tradition is unknown.

== Notable inhabitants & natives ==
- Estéban de Perea
- Pedro Portocarrero
- Pedro de Quevedo y Quintano
- José Antonio Saravia
- Lourdes Vega

== See also ==
- List of municipalities in Badajoz
