= 2012–13 Xerez CD season =

Xerez CD
2012–13 season
- Chairman: Rafael Mateos
- Manager: Esteban Vigo (until 18 February); Carlos Ríos (from 20 February)
- Segunda División: 22nd (relegated)
- Copa Del Rey: Second round

The 2012–13 Xerez CD season is the 66th season in club history.

== Matches ==
=== Legend ===
Win Draw Loss Postponed

=== Segunda División ===
18 August 2012 1	Xerez	2 – 0	Recreativo	Jerez de la Frontera
21:00	Porcar (yellow card) 37'; José Mari 49'; Silva 52'; Cámara (yellow card) 89'	Summary	Córcoles (yellow card) 19'; Cifu (yellow card) 25'; Martínez (yellow card) 46'; Morcillo (yellow card) 51'; Dimas (yellow card) 88'	Stadium: Municipal de Chapín; Attendance: 5,496; Referee: Fernando López Acera; Assistant referees: Juan Manuel Sánchez Fernández; Alberto Romera Durán; Fourth official: Antonio Santos

24 August 2012 2	Almería	2 – 1	Xerez	Almería
21:00	Charles 9', 26'; Rafita (yellow card) 46'; Mejía (yellow card) 73'	Summary	Israel (yellow card) 21'; Vega 23'; Cámara (yellow card) 45'; Silva (yellow card) 48'; Prieto (yellow card) 57'; Mendoza (yellow card) 81'	Stadium: Juegos Mediterráneos; Attendance: 5,814; Referee: Dámaso Arcediano Monescillo; Assistant referees: Enrique Rodríguez Sánchez; Jaime Jiménez; Fourth official: Francisco Navarro

1 September 2012 3	Xerez	0 – 4	Mirandés	Jerez de la Frontera
18:00	Mendoza (yellow card) 30'; Silva (yellow card) 69'	Summary	Mújika (yellow card) 19'; Infante 45+1', 62'; Garmendia (yellow card) 48'; Blanco 51'; Corral (yellow card) 56'; Goiria 77'	Stadium: Municipal de Chapín; Attendance: 6,000; Referee: David Medié; Assistant referees: José María Ungueti Ruiz; Jose María Carrera García; Fourth official: Jesús Arroyo

8 September 2012 4	Real Madrid Castilla	3 – 2	Xerez	Madrid
22:00	Álex (yellow card) 28'; Morata 32'; B. García 40'; Mosquera (yellow card) 49'; Jesé 54'; Mateos (yellow card) 69'	Summary	Vélez 20'; R. García (yellow card) 30'; Mendoza (yellow card) 38'; Vega (yellow card) 60'; Maldonado (yellow card) 72'; Israel (yellow card) 85'; José Mari 90+3'	Stadium: Alfredo di Stéfano Stadium; Attendance: 2,240; Referee: Ricardo de Burgos Bengoetxea; Assistant referees: Javier Rodríguez Echavarri; Rafael Orellana; Fourth official: Javier González

15 September 2012 5	Xerez	2 – 0	Numancia	Jerez de la Frontera
18:00	Rueda 44', (yellow card) 74'; Vega (yellow card) 48' (yellow-red card) 82'; Rey 68'; Toni (yellow card) 85'	Summary	Nagore (yellow card) 23'; Sunday (yellow card) 53'; Del Pino (yellow card) 63'; Álvarez (yellow card) 79'	Stadium: Municipal de Chapín; Attendance: 5,279; Referee: José Lesma; Assistant referees: José Garrido; David Maldonado; Fourth official: Valentín Pizarro

22 September 2012 6	Sabadell	3 – 0	Xerez	Sabadell
18:00	Ciércoles (yellow card) 26'; Tortolero (yellow card) 31', (goal) 49'; Lanzarote (yellow card) 40'; El Yaagoubi 43'; Espasandín 56'; Hidalgo (yellow card) 67'; Ramírez (yellow card) 89'	Summary		Stadium: Nova Creu Alta; Attendance: 3,302; Referee: Daniel Ocón; Assistant referees: Iñigo Retegui; Antonio Carreño; Fourth official: Antonio Monter

29 September 2012 7	Xerez	0 – 3	Real Murcia	Jerez de la Frontera
18:00	Rueda (yellow card) 22'; Silva (yellow card) 44'; Bouzón (yellow card) 55' (yellow-red card) 65'	Summary	Catalá (yellow card) 29'; García 37'; Ó. Sánchez 43'; E. Sánchez 87'	Stadium: Municipal de Chapín; Attendance: 3,302; Referee: Iñaki Bikandi Garrido; Assistant referees: Ramón Hernández Hernández; Aitor Villate; Fourth official: Víctor García

6 October 2012 8	Guadalajara	1 – 1	Xerez	Guadalajara, Castile-La Mancha
18:00	Aitor (yellow card) 41'; Antón 81' (pen.)	Summary	Herrero (yellow card) 61'; Maldonado 79'; Chema (yellow card) 84'	Stadium: Pedro Escartín; Attendance: 3,000; Referee: Jorge Valdés Aller; Assistant referees: Carlos Valles Mazariegos; Julio César Ortega Nájera; Fourth official: Alejandro Fernández

13 October 2012 9	Xerez	1 – 1	Racing Santander	Jerez de la Frontera
18:00	Maldonado 9', (yellow card) 14'; Vega (yellow card) 15'; Keita (yellow card) 30'; Tato (yellow card) 71'; Israel (yellow card) 77'; Rey (yellow card) 79'	Summary	Kaluđerović 4'; Francis (yellow card) 26'; Ferreiro (yellow card) 60'; Sotres (yellow card) 89'	Stadium: Municipal de Chapín; Attendance: 5,727; Referee: Eduardo Prieto; Assistant referees: Francisco García; Iñigo Prieto; Fourth official: Jesús Benjumea

20 October 2012 10	Ponferradina	0 – 1	Xerez	Ponferrada
18:00	Carpio (yellow card) 3'; Yuri (yellow card) 46'; Lafuente (yellow card) 46'; Isaías (yellow card) 46'	Summary	Vega (yellow card) 21'; Rey (yellow card) 38'; Silva (yellow card) 39'; Herrero (yellow card) 70'; Bouzón (yellow card) 72'; Redondo (yellow card) 76'; Maldonado (yellow card) 89'; Tato 90+1'	Stadium: El Toralín; Referee: Pablo González; Assistant referees: Rafael Orellana; Ramón García; Fourth official: Jaime Ruiz

28 October 2012 11	Xerez	1 – 0	Lugo	Jerez de la Frontera
18:00	Herrero (yellow card) 4' (yellow-red card) 89'; Vega 23'; Silva (yellow card) 35'; Keita (yellow card) 56'; Bouzón (yellow card) 60' (yellow-red card) 86'; Israel (yellow card) 87'	Summary	Pita (yellow card) 54'; Manu (yellow card) 57'	Stadium: Municipal de Chapín; Attendance: 6,000; Referee: Pedro Sureda; Assistant referees: Rafael Rodriguez; José Silva; Fourth official: Raúl Chavet

4 November 2012 12	Hércules	1 – 5	Xerez	Alicante
12:00	Escassi (yellow card) 4'; Mora (yellow card) 49'; Bedia 71', (yellow card) 89'	Summary	Rey 4'; Israel 23'; Porcar (yellow card) 47', (goal) 48'; Tato 58', 73'; Bicho (yellow card) 87'	Stadium: José Rico Pérez; Attendance: 5,500; Referee: David Medié; Assistant referees: José María Ungueti Ruiz; Jose María Carrera García; Fourth official: Ruben Jiménez

10 November 2012 13	Xerez	0 – 0	Elche	Jerez de la Frontera
21:30	Vega (yellow card) 41' (yellow-red card) 51'; Keita (yellow card) 85'; Israel (yellow card) 89'	Summary	Fidel (yellow card) 37'	Stadium: Municipal de Chapín; Attendance: 5,878; Referee: José María Sánchez Martínez; Assistant referees: Javier Martínez Nicolás; Juan José López Mir; Fourth official: Abraham Domínguez

17 November 2012 14	Las Palmas	1 – 1	Xerez	Las Palmas
19:00	Guerrero 32', (yellow card) 50'; Castellano (yellow card) 44'; Murillo (yellow card) 66'	Summary	Bouzón (yellow card) 47'; Cámara (yellow card) 53'; Rey (yellow card) 56'; Redondo 58'; Rueda (yellow card) 80'; Tato (yellow card) 86'	Stadium: Gran Canaria; Attendance: 10,112; Referee: Santiago Jaime; Assistant referees: Raúl Escuderos; Mateo Vaquero; Fourth official: David Pinto

25 November 2012 15	Xerez	2 – 4	Alcorcón	Jerez de la Frontera
17:00	Rey 53'; Cámara (yellow card) 67'; Maldonado 78', (yellow card) 89'	Summary	Camille (yellow card) 20'; Babin (yellow card) 23'; Riera 32', 81'; Sales 58'; Nagore (yellow card) 87'; Kike 90+1'	Stadium: Municipal de Chapín; Attendance: 5,927; Referee: Daniel Jesús Trujillo Suárez; Assistant referees: Álvaro Carreño; Rubén Porras; Fourth official: Jonathan Cruz

1 December 2012 16	Córdoba	0 – 0	Xerez	Córdoba, Andalusia
18:00	Dubarbier (yellow card) 40'; Vico (yellow card) 43'; Cristian (yellow card) 44' (yellow-red card) 82'; Gaspar (yellow card) 65'	Summary	Mendoza (yellow card) 36'; Keita (yellow card) 54'	Stadium: Nuevo Arcángel; Attendance: 9,000; Referee: Eduardo Prieto; Assistant referees: Francisco García; Iñigo Prieto; Fourth official: Iker Berjano

9 December 2012 17	Xerez	0 – 2	Girona	Jerez de la Frontera
17:00	Rueda (yellow card) 39'; Cámara (yellow card) 76'	Summary	Jofre 7'; Benja 62'	Stadium: Municipal de Chapín; Attendance: 6,000; Referee: Juan Martínez Munuera; Assistant referees: David Canales; Sergio Chinchilla; Fourth official: Jesús Muñoz

16 December 2012 18	Sporting de Gijón	3 – 0	Xerez	Gijón
17:00	Hernández (yellow card) 11'; Canella (yellow card) 42'; Bilić 54', 87', (yellow card) 69'; Mandi (yellow card) 68'; Trejo (yellow card) 78'; Cases 83'	Summary	Mendoza (yellow card) 3'; José Mari (yellow card) 28'; Rueda (yellow card) 77'; Rey (yellow card) 88'	Stadium: El Molinón; Attendance: 16,000; Referee: David Pérez; Assistant referees: Enrique Ramos; Roberto Vázquez Alvite; Fourth official: Manuel Vidal

20 December 2012 19	Xerez	0 – 0	Villarreal	Jerez de la Frontera
20:00	Ruz (yellow card) 17'; Cámara (yellow card) 65'; Tato (yellow card) 87'	Summary	Trigueros (yellow card) 15'; Bruno (yellow card) 68'; Pérez (yellow card) 89'	Stadium: Municipal de Chapín; Attendance: 4,447; Referee: Santiago Jaime; Assistant referees: Jorge Bueno; Ramón García; Fourth official: Ricardo Escudero

6 January 2013 20	Xerez	1 – 1	Huesca	Jerez de la Frontera
17:00	Marquitos 42'; Ruz (yellow card) 49'; Adrián (yellow card) 51'	Summary	Spezie (yellow card) 23'; Novo 64'; Camacho (yellow card) 87'; Sorribas (yellow card) 89'	Stadium: Municipal de Chapín; Attendance: 3,892; Referee: Alfonso Pino

12 January 2013 21	Barcelona B	4 – 2	Xerez	Barcelona
18:00	Deulofeu 19'; Espinosa 71'; Luis Alberto 72'; Román 90+4'	Summary	Porcar 52', 64'; Bouzón (yellow card) 62'; Rueda (yellow card) 82'	Stadium: Mini Estadi; Attendance: 4,833; Referee: José María Sánchez Martínez

20 January 2013 22	Recreativo	2 – 0	Xerez	Huelva
12:00	Dimas (yellow card) 12'; Chuli 32', 41'; Zamora (yellow card) 50'; Morcillo (yellow card) 73'; Cabrero (yellow card) 87'; Montoro (yellow card) 88'	Summary	García (yellow card) 26'	Stadium: Nuevo Colombino; Attendance: 6,000; Referee: Fernando López

27 January 2013 23	Xerez	0 – 2	Almería	Jerez de la Frontera
17:00	Maldonado (yellow card) 4'; Rey (yellow card) 22'; Adri (yellow card) 49'; García (yellow card) 63'; Keita (yellow card) 79'	Summary	Pellerano (yellow card) 30'; Corona 42'; Charles 44'; Christian (yellow card) 84'; Gunino (yellow card) 87'	Stadium: Municipal de Chapín; Attendance: 5,202; Referee: José Piñeiro

3 February 2013 24	Mirandés	1 – 0	Xerez	Miranda de Ebro
17:00	Arroyo (yellow card) 51'; Soria 88'	Summary	Bouzón (yellow card) 82'; Prieto (yellow card) 87'	Stadium: Municipal de Anduva; Attendance: 4,865; Referee: Pedro Sureda

9 February 2013 25	Xerez	0 – 1	Real Madrid Castilla	Jerez de la Frontera
18:00	R. García (yellow card) 3' (yellow-red card) 33'; Maldonado (yellow card) 28'; Mendoza (yellow card) 37'; Prieto (yellow card) 83'	Summary	Mascarell (yellow card) 21'; Vázquez 88'	Stadium: Municipal de Chapín; Attendance: 6,474; Referee: David Pérez

=== Copa del Rey ===
12 September 2012 Second Round	Xerez	0 – 1	Las Palmas	Jerez de la Frontera
21:00	Porcar (yellow card) 12'; Silva (yellow card) 39'; Tato (yellow card) 51'; Rey (yellow card) 62'; Ruz (yellow card) 78'	Summary	Vitolo (yellow card) 24' (yellow-red card) 30'; Gómez 45'; Barbosa (yellow card) 58'; D. García (yellow card) 89'; Aythami (yellow card) 89'	Stadium: Municipal de Chapín; Referee: David Pérez
