= 2012–13 Recreativo de Huelva season =

Recreativo de Huelva
2012–13 season
- Segunda División: 13th
- Copa del Rey: Second round

The 2012–13 Recreativo de Huelva season is the 75th season in club history.

== Matches ==
=== Legend ===
Win Draw Loss Postponed

=== Segunda División ===
18 August 2012 1	Xerez CD	2–0	Recreativo de Huelva	Jerez de la Frontera
21:00	Porcar (yellow card) 37'; José Mari 49'; Álvaro Silva 52'; Raúl Cámara (yellow card) 89'	Summary	Córcoles (yellow card) 19'; Cifu (yellow card) 25'; Manuel Martínez (yellow card) 46'; Morcillo (yellow card) 51'; Dimas (yellow card) 88'	Stadium: Estadio Municipal de Chapín; Attendance: 5,496; Referee: Fernando López; Assistant referees: Juan Manuel Sánchez; Alberto Romera Durán; Fourth official: Antonio Santos

25 August 2012 2	Recreativo de Huelva	1–0	CD Mirandés	Huelva, Andalusia
19:00	Dimas (yellow card) 50'; Jonatan Valle 69'; Córcoles (yellow card) 83'	Summary	Aritz Mujika (yellow card) 18'; Mikel Martins (yellow card) 38'; Javi Soria (yellow card) 42'; Koikili (yellow card) 42'	Stadium: Estadio Nuevo Colombino; Attendance: 5,000; Referee: Alfonso Pino; Assistant referees: Raúl Escuderos; Mateo Vaquero; Fourth official: Jesús Muñoz

1 September 2012 3	CD Numancia	0–0	Recreativo de Huelva	Soria, Castile and León
18:00	Juanma (yellow card) 34'; Larrea (yellow card) 43'; Mabwati (yellow card) 44'; Iván Malón (yellow card) 66'	Summary	Ángel Montoro (yellow card) 49' (yellow-red card) 75'; Fernando Vega (yellow card) 52' (yellow-red card) 88'; Morcillo (yellow card) 60'; Juan Zamora (yellow card) 89'	Stadium: Nuevo Estadio Los Pajaritos; Attendance: 3,000; Referee: Pedro Sureda; Assistant referees: Rafael Rodríguez; José Silva; Fourth official: Iván González

8 September 2012 4	Recreativo de Huelva	3–2	Real Murcia	Huelva, Andalusia
16:00	Chuli 9', 45' (yellow card) 34'; Morcillo (yellow card) 49'; Dimas (yellow card) 55'; Matamala (yellow card) 57'; Jonatan Valle (yellow card) 60'; Jesús Rubio 79'	Summary	Mauro dos Santos (yellow card) 20'; Nafti (yellow card) 25'; Javier Matilla 57' (pen.); Emilio Sánchez (yellow card) 72'; Javi Jiménez (yellow card) 76'; Óscar Sánchez (red card) 76'; Cristian García 82' (yellow card) 88'	Stadium: Estadio Nuevo Colombino; Attendance: 4,271; Referee: David Pérez; Assistant referees: Enrique Ramos; Fourth official: Roberto Vázquez Alvite; Carlos Sánchez

15 September 2012 5	Racing de Santander	3–0	Recreativo de Huelva	Santander, Spain, Cantabria
18:00	Jairo Samperio 59'; Kaluđerović 64' (pen.) (yellow card) 64'; Assulin 90+2'	Summary	Juan Zamora (yellow card) 61'; Jesús Rubio Martín (yellow card) 86'	Stadium: Campos de Sport de El Sardinero; Attendance: 6,390; Referee: José Piñeiro; Assistant referees: Damián Abril; Francisco Villanueva; Fourth official: José Hernández

22 September 2012 6	Recreativo de Huelva	3–0	Lugo	Huelva, Andalusia
18:00	Borja Granero (yellow card) 3'; Córcoles (yellow card) 46'; Brożek 55'; Jesús Rubio Martín 63'; Fernando Vega 79'	Summary	Pavón (yellow card) 31' (yellow-red card) 54'; Manu (yellow card) 83'	Stadium: Estadio Nuevo Colombino; Attendance: 5,120; Referee: Juan Martínez Munuera; Assistant referees: David Canales; Sergio Chinchilla; Fourth official: Ramón Arias

29 September 2012 7	Elche	3–0	Recreativo de Huelva	Elche, Valencia
20:00	Fidel 2'; Matamala 15' (o.g.)Coro 30'; Edu Albácar (yellow card) 58'; Powel (yellow card) 87'	Summary	Córcoles (yellow card) 41'; Jesús Rubio Martín (yellow card) 61'; Alejandro (yellow card) 67'; Dimas (yellow card) 72'	Stadium: Estadio Manuel Martínez Valero; Attendance: 7,100; Referee: Francisco Arias; Assistant referees: César de Juana; Rómulo Álvarez; Fourth official: Miguel Ortiz

6 October 2012 8	Recreativo de Huelva	4–2	AD Alcorcón	Huelva, Andalusia
18:00	Chuli 12', 48', 50'; Morcillo (yellow card) 38'; Manuel Martínez Lara (yellow card) 38'; Dimas (yellow card) 46' (goal) 86'; Córcoles (yellow card) 69'	Summary	Oriol (yellow card) 17' (yellow-red card) 79' (goal) 71'; Juli 26' (yellow card) 75'; Kike (yellow card) 44'; Rubén Sanz (yellow card) 44'; Víctor Laguardia (yellow card) 53'	Stadium: Estadio Nuevo Colombino; Attendance: 6,000; Referee: Pablo González; Assistant referees: Rafael Orellana; Ramón García; Fourth official: José Luis Munuera Montero

14 October 2012 9	Girona FC	5–2	Recreativo de Huelva	Girona, Catalonia
19:00	Jandro 45' (pen.); Luso 48', 67'; Benja 62'; Acuña 78'	Summary	Matamala (yellow card) 20'; Ángel Montoro (yellow card) 42'; Cifu (yellow card) 44'; Borja Granero 63'; Manuel Martínez Lara (yellow card) 64'; Alexander Szymanowski 79' (yellow card) 84'	Stadium: Estadi Montilivi; Attendance: 4,281; Referee: Iñaki Bikandi; Assistant referees: Ramón Hernández; Aitor Villate; Fourth official: Antonio Monter

21 October 2012 10	Recreativo de Huelva	2–0	Villarreal CF	Huelva, Andalusia
18:00	Chuli (yellow card) 15'; Ángel Montoro (yellow card) 22'; Juan Zamora (yellow card) 46'; Alexander Szymanowski 63'; Jonatan 90+3'	Summary	Senna (yellow card) 75'; Hernán Pérez (yellow card) 77' (yellow-red card) 83'; Lejeune (yellow card) 78'; Mario (yellow card) 89'	Stadium: Estadio Nuevo Colombino; Referee: David Medié; Assistant referees: José María Ungueti Ruiz; Jose María Carrera García; Fourth official: Luis Milla

26 October 2012 11	Barcelona B	2–3	Recreativo de Huelva	Barcelona, Catalonia
21:00	Gerard Deulofeu 26'; Rafinha (yellow card) 28' (goal) 68'; Álex Grimaldo (yellow card) 44'	Summary	Jordi Matamala 35'; Alexander Szymanowski 83'; Jonatan Valle 87'; Alejandro (yellow card) 89'; Jesús Berrocal (yellow card) 89'	Stadium: Mini Estadi; Attendance: 1,714; Referee: Alfonso Pino; Assistant referees: Raúl Escuderos; Mateo Vaquero; Fourth official: Sergio Pérez

4 November 2012 12	Recreativo de Huelva	0–2	Almería	Huelva, Andalusia
20:30	Jordi Matamala (yellow card) 35'; Jorge Morcillo (yellow card) 71'; Jesús Rubio (yellow card) 79'; Manolo (yellow card) 88'	Summary	Rafita (yellow card) 16'; Raúl García Carnero 22'; Ángel Trujillo (yellow card) 50'; Álvaro Mejía 61'	Stadium: Estadio Nuevo Colombino; Attendance: 4,693; Referee: José María Sánchez Martínez; Assistant referees: Javier Martínez Nicolás; Juan Jose López Mir; Fourth official: Ricardo Escudero

12 November 2012 13	Real Madrid Castilla	0–1	Recreativo de Huelva	Madrid, Madrid
21:00	Pedro Mosquera (yellow card) 46'; David Mateos (yellow card) 66'	Summary	Fernando Vega (yellow card) 4'; Jonatan Valle (yellow card) 24'; Jordi Matamala (yellow card) 33'; Alexander Szymanowski 77'; Manolo (yellow card) 89'	Stadium: Alfredo di Stéfano Stadium; Attendance: 1,727; Referee: Eduardo Prieto; Assistant referees: Francisco García; Iñigo Prieto; Fourth official: Tomás Martín

18 November 2012 14	Recreativo de Huelva	2–5	Sabadell	Huelva, Andalusia
12:00	Jonatan Valle 20'; Fernando Vega (red card) 21'; Dimas (yellow card) 33'; Chuli 64'; Jordi Matamala (yellow card) 80'	Summary	Pablo Ruiz (yellow card) 15'; Lanzarote 23' (pen.); Juanjo Ciércoles (yellow card) 29'; Antonio Hidalgo 35'; Abraham Paz (yellow card) 42'; Ulises Dávila 69', 81'; Arteaga 74' (pen.); Antonio Lao (yellow card) 76'	Stadium: Estadio Nuevo Colombino; Attendance: 6,500; Referee: Jorge Valdés Aller; Assistant referees: Carlos Valles Mazariegos; Julio César Ortega Nájera; Fourth official: Carlos López

24 November 2012 15	Guadalajara	–	Recreativo de Huelva	Guadalajara, Castile-La Mancha, Castile-La Mancha
18:00				Stadium: Estadio Pedro Escartín

2 December 2012 16	Recreativo de Huelva	–	Ponferradina	Huelva, Andalusia
12:00				Stadium: Estadio Nuevo Colombino

9 December 2012 17	Hércules	–	Recreativo de Huelva	Alicante, Valenica
12:00				Stadium: Estadio José Rico Pérez

=== Copa Del Rey ===
11 September 2012 Second Round	Mirandés	2–0	Recreativo de Huelva	Miranda de Ebro, Castile and León
21:30	Rayco 1'; Mikel Iribas (yellow card) 17'; Javi Soria 77'; Alain Arroyo (yellow card) 88'	Summary	Ángel Montoro (yellow card) 73'; Córcoles (yellow card) 80'	Stadium: Estadio Municipal de Anduva; Referee: Daniel Ocón
