= 1997 UEFA European Under-16 Championship squads =

Below are the rosters for the UEFA European Under-16 Football Championship 1997 tournament in Germany.

== Group A ==
=== Germany ===
No.	Pos.	Player	Date of birth (age)	Caps	Goals	Club
	GK	Stefan Kliche	23 September 1980 (aged 16)			(German Football Association) Hamburger SV
	GK	Roman Weidenfeller	6 August 1980 (aged 16)			(German Football Association) 1. FC Kaiserslautern
	DF	Simon Knipper	17 April 1981 (aged 16)			(German Football Association) Werder Bremen
	DF	Thorben Marx	1 June 1981 (aged 15)			(German Football Association) Hertha Zehlendorf
	DF	Benjamin Schöckel	16 August 1980 (aged 16)			(German Football Association) Bayern Munich
	DF	Matthias Straub	24 November 1980 (aged 16)			(German Football Association) VfB Stuttgart
	DF	Michael Zepek	19 January 1981 (aged 16)			(German Football Association) Karlsruher SC
	MF	Sebastian Backer	5 September 1980 (aged 16)			(German Football Association) Bayern Munich
	MF	Francis Bugri	23 May 1981 (aged 15)			(German Football Association) Borussia Dortmund
	MF	Marco Christ	6 November 1980 (aged 16)			(German Football Association) 1. FC Nürnberg
	MF	Simon Cziommer	6 November 1980 (aged 16)			(Royal Dutch Football Association) FC Twente
	MF	Clemens Fritz	7 December 1980 (aged 16)			(German Football Association) Rot Weiss Erfurt
	MF	Markus Schinner	20 January 1981 (aged 16)			(German Football Association) Hannover 96
	FW	Silvio Adzic	23 September 1980 (aged 16)			(German Football Association) 1. FC Kaiserslautern
	FW	Benjamin Auer	11 January 1981 (aged 16)			(German Football Association) 1. FC Kaiserslautern
	FW	Florian Wurster	20 August 1980 (aged 16)			(German Football Association) VfB Stuttgart

=== Northern Ireland ===
No.	Pos.	Player	Date of birth (age)	Caps	Goals	Club
	GK	Paul Prentice	7 August 1980 (aged 16)			(Irish Football Association) Distillery
	GK	Steven Mills	31 October 1980 (aged 16)			(Irish Football Association) Larne
	DF	Ricky Culbertson	14 January 1981 (aged 16)			(The Football Association) Norwich City
	DF	Shaun Holmes	27 December 1980 (aged 16)			(The Football Association) Manchester City
	DF	Gareth Macklin	27 August 1980 (aged 16)			(Irish Football Association) Carnmoney Colts
	DF	Francis McKeown	11 February 1981 (aged 16)			(The Football Association) Bolton Wanderers
	DF	Gordon Simms	23 March 1981 (aged 16)			(Irish Football Association) Larne
	MF	Stephen Carson	6 October 1980 (aged 16)			(Scottish Football Association) Rangers
	MF	Steven Hawe	23 December 1980 (aged 16)			(The Football Association) Blackburn Rovers
	MF	Kieran Loughran	26 August 1980 (aged 16)			(The Football Association) Crystal Palace
	MF	Marc McCann	6 August 1980 (aged 16)			(The Football Association) Wolverhampton Wanderers
	MF	Terry McFlynn	27 March 1981 (aged 16)			(The Football Association) Queens Park Rangers
	FW	Warren Feeney	17 January 1981 (aged 16)			(The Football Association) Leeds United
	FW	Gary Hamilton	6 October 1980 (aged 16)			(The Football Association) Blackburn Rovers
	FW	Paul McAreavey	3 December 1980 (aged 16)			(The Football Association) Swindon Town
	FW	Andrew Morrow	5 October 1980 (aged 16)			(Irish Football Association) Linfield

=== Switzerland ===
No.	Pos.	Player	Date of birth (age)	Caps	Goals	Club
	GK	Nicolas Beney	14 September 1980 (aged 16)			(Swiss Football Association) FC Sion
	GK	Alain Portmann	14 February 1981 (aged 16)			(Swiss Football Association) FC Solothurn
	DF	Luca Denicola	17 April 1981 (aged 16)			(Swiss Football Association) FC Lugano
	DF	Mario Eggimann	24 January 1981 (aged 16)			(Swiss Football Association) FC Aarau
	DF	Remo Meyer	12 November 1980 (aged 16)			(Swiss Football Association) FC Luzern
	DF	Philipp Meyer	16 September 1980 (aged 16)			(Swiss Football Association) FC St. Gallen
	DF	Roland Schwegler	3 February 1982 (aged 15)			(Swiss Football Association) FC Hochdorf
	MF	Simon Hofer	22 July 1981 (aged 15)			(Swiss Football Association) SC Steinausen
	MF	Patrick Kropf	23 September 1980 (aged 16)			(Swiss Football Association) FC Aarau
	MF	Nicolas Marazzi	13 July 1981 (aged 15)			(Swiss Football Association) FC Sion
	MF	Damiano Tamanti	3 November 1980 (aged 16)			(Swiss Football Association) FC St. Gallen
	MF	Christophe Tranchet	12 February 1981 (aged 16)			(Swiss Football Association) Servette FC Genève
	MF	Vincenzo Zinna	26 August 1981 (aged 15)			(Swiss Football Association) FC St. Gallen
	FW	Reto Colantonio	1 August 1980 (aged 16)			(Swiss Football Association) FC Schaffhausen
	FW	Vincent Jaquier	21 August 1980 (aged 16)			(Swiss Football Association) Lausanne Sports
	FW	Christophe Margueti	1 May 1981 (aged 15)			(Swiss Football Association) FC Sion

== Group B ==
=== Austria ===
No.	Pos.	Player	Date of birth (age)	Caps	Goals	Club
	GK	Hans-Peter Berger	28 September 1981 (aged 15)			(Austrian Football Association) SV Austria Salzburg
	GK	Marc Pieler	6 February 1981 (aged 16)			(Austrian Football Association) FK Austria Wien
	DF	Yalcin Demir	14 January 1981 (aged 16)			(Austrian Football Association) FC Linz
	DF	Stefan Friessnegger	23 August 1980 (aged 16)			(Austrian Football Association) SK Austria Klagenfurt
	DF	Bernd Kren	10 December 1980 (aged 16)			(Austrian Football Association) Admira/Wacker
	DF	Christian Mikula	13 December 1980 (aged 16)			(Austrian Football Association) FK Austria Wien
	MF	Ümit Erbay	18 September 1980 (aged 16)			(Austrian Football Association) SK Rapid Wien
	MF	Philipp Frenzl	31 May 1981 (aged 15)			(Austrian Football Association) SK Rapid Wien
	MF	Lukas Habeler	3 August 1980 (aged 16)			(Austrian Football Association) Admira/Wacker
	MF	Jürgen Kampel	28 January 1981 (aged 16)			(Austrian Football Association) SK Austria Klagenfurt
	MF	Pascal Ortner	24 November 1980 (aged 16)			(Austrian Football Association) FC Linz
	MF	Alexander Ziervogel	20 January 1981 (aged 16)			(Austrian Football Association) Admira/Wacker
	FW	Sebastian Bachleitner	24 December 1981 (aged 15)			(Austrian Football Association) FC Linz
	FW	Thomas Eder	25 December 1980 (aged 16)			(Austrian Football Association) SV Austria Salzburg
	FW	Marc Niemetz	13 November 1980 (aged 16)			(Austrian Football Association) FC Gratkorn
	FW	Alexander Unger	17 October 1980 (aged 16)			(Austrian Football Association) FC Linz

=== Poland ===
No.	Pos.	Player	Date of birth (age)	Caps	Goals	Club
	GK	Paweł Pazdan	5 December 1980 (aged 16)			(Polish Football Association) Agrykola Warszawa
	GK	Mateusz Sławik	3 November 1980 (aged 16)			(Polish Football Association) GKS Katowice
	GK	Paweł Śmigasiewicz	10 November 1980 (aged 16)			(Polish Football Association) Podlasie Biała Podlaska
	DF	Mateusz Kędzior	13 August 1980 (aged 16)			(Polish Football Association) MKS Dębica
	DF	Piotr Kolasiński	19 August 1980 (aged 16)			(Polish Football Association) Olimpia Poznań
	DF	Krzysztof Kotlarski	21 October 1980 (aged 16)			(Polish Football Association) Zagłębie Lubin
	DF	Marcin Majchrzak	11 August 1980 (aged 16)			(Polish Football Association) Śląsk Wrocław
	DF	Michał Stasiak	12 March 1981 (aged 16)			(Polish Football Association) MKS Zduńska Wola
	DF	Łukasz Tupalski	4 September 1980 (aged 16)			(Polish Football Association) Jagiellonia Białystok
	MF	Artur Błażejewski	1 January 1981 (aged 16)			(Polish Football Association) MSP Szamotuły
	MF	Marcin Bryła	15 September 1980 (aged 16)			(Polish Football Association) GKS Katowice
	MF	Andriusz Mozoluk	16 September 1980 (aged 16)			(Polish Football Association) Olimpia Poznań
	MF	Tomasz Radziwon	29 August 1980 (aged 16)			(Polish Football Association) Stomil Olsztyn
	MF	Tomasz Stankiewicz	8 August 1980 (aged 16)			(Polish Football Association) MSP Szamotuły
	FW	Rafał Jankowski	12 August 1980 (aged 16)			(Polish Football Association) MSP Szamotuły
	FW	Piotr Karwan	20 August 1980 (aged 16)			(Polish Football Association) Tomasovia Tomaszów Lubelski
	FW	Robert Kolendowicz	26 September 1980 (aged 16)			(Polish Football Association) MSP Szamotuły
	FW	Patryk Rachwał	27 January 1981 (aged 16)			(Polish Football Association) Górnik Zabrze

=== Spain ===
No.	Pos.	Player	Date of birth (age)	Caps	Goals	Club
	GK	Iker Casillas	20 May 1981 (aged 15)			(Royal Spanish Football Federation) Real Madrid
	GK	Antonio Moya	4 February 1981 (aged 16)			(Royal Spanish Football Federation) Atlético Madrid
	DF	Javier Baraja	24 August 1980 (aged 16)			(Royal Spanish Football Federation) Real Valladolid
	DF	Zuhaitz Gurrutxaga	23 November 1980 (aged 16)			(Royal Spanish Football Federation) CD Elgoibar
	DF	Ander Aranceta	27 August 1980 (aged 16)			(Royal Spanish Football Federation) Real Sociedad
	DF	Iván Sánchez	7 August 1980 (aged 16)			(Royal Spanish Football Federation) Real Zaragoza
	DF	Juan Blas	10 September 1980 (aged 16)			(Royal Spanish Football Federation) UE Lleida
	MF	Corona	12 February 1981 (aged 16)			(Royal Spanish Football Federation) Real Madrid
	MF	Nelo	20 February 1981 (aged 16)			(Royal Spanish Football Federation) Valencia CF
	MF	Juanjo Camacho	2 August 1980 (aged 16)			(Royal Spanish Football Federation) Real Zaragoza
	MF	Antonio Cuartero	17 November 1980 (aged 16)			(Royal Spanish Football Federation) Real Madrid
	MF	Miguel Mateos	17 October 1980 (aged 16)			(Royal Spanish Football Federation) Real Madrid
	MF	Nacho Garro	21 April 1981 (aged 16)			(Royal Spanish Football Federation) Athletic Bilbao
	FW	David Rodríguez	24 October 1980 (aged 16)			(Royal Spanish Football Federation) Real Madrid
	FW	Iván López	3 December 1980 (aged 16)			(Royal Spanish Football Federation) Valencia CF
	FW	Gorka Sánchez	2 May 1981 (aged 15)			(Royal Spanish Football Federation) Athletic Bilbao

=== Ukraine ===
Head coach: Valeriy Shvedyuk

No.	Pos.	Player	Date of birth (age)	Caps	Goals	Club
1	GK	Artem Kusliy	7 July 1981 (aged 15)			(Ukrainian Association of Football) Dnipro-75 Dnipropetrovsk
2	DF	Dmytro Pinchuk	6 January 1982 (aged 15)			(Ukrainian Association of Football) Dynamo Kyiv
3	DF	Kostiantyn Sheremet	21 October 1980 (aged 16)			
4	DF	Serhiy Khistyev	30 June 1981 (aged 15)			(Ukrainian Association of Football) Dynamo Kyiv
5	DF	Vyacheslav Zapoyaska	24 August 1980 (aged 16)			(Ukrainian Association of Football) Metalist Kharkiv
6	DF	Dmytro Ryumin	14 January 1981 (aged 16)			(Ukrainian Association of Football) Torpedo Zaporizhia
7	MF	Dmytro Bermudes	11 August 1980 (aged 16)			(Ukrainian Association of Football) Dynamo Kyiv
8	FW	Serhiy Levchenko	3 January 1981 (aged 16)			(German Football Association) Borussia Mönchengladbach
9	MF	Yevhen Lutsenko	10 November 1980 (aged 16)			(Royal Belgian Football Association) R.S.C. Anderlecht
10	FW	Oleksiy Telyatnykov	21 October 1980 (aged 16)			(Ukrainian Association of Football) Torpedo Zaporizhia
11		Nesterenko				
12	DF	Bohdan Shershun	14 May 1981 (aged 15)			(Ukrainian Association of Football) Dnipro Dnipropetrovsk
13	MF	Serhiy Novikov	15 June 1980 (aged 16)			(Ukrainian Association of Football) Nyva Bershad
14	FW	Andriy Pisnyi	20 September 1980 (aged 16)			(Ukrainian Association of Football) Dnipro Dnipropetrovsk
15	MF	Vladyslav Orlov	14 August 1980 (aged 16)			(Ukrainian Association of Football) Chornomorets Odesa
16	FW	Vitaliy Martynyuk	14 December 1980 (aged 16)			(Ukrainian Association of Football) Chornomorets Odesa

== Group C ==
=== Belgium ===
No.	Pos.	Player	Date of birth (age)	Caps	Goals	Club
	GK	Nicolas Denys	18 August 1980 (aged 16)			(Royal Belgian Football Association) K.A.A. Gent
	GK	Tom Meyers	17 April 1981 (aged 16)			(Royal Belgian Football Association) R.W.D. Molenbeek
	DF	Jacques Danneaux	15 October 1980 (aged 16)			(Royal Belgian Football Association) R.S.C. Anderlecht
	DF	Robrecht Deckers	28 March 1981 (aged 16)			(Royal Belgian Football Association) K. Sint-Truidense V.V.
	DF	Steven Degeest	16 June 1981 (aged 15)			(Royal Belgian Football Association) K.S.C. Lokeren
	DF	Yannick Vervalle	3 June 1981 (aged 15)			(Royal Belgian Football Association) R.S.C. Anderlecht
	MF	Thomas Buffel	19 February 1981 (aged 16)			(Royal Belgian Football Association) Cercle Brugge K.S.V.
	MF	Franky Eerdekens	5 September 1980 (aged 16)			(Royal Belgian Football Association) K.R.C. Genk
	MF	Kristof Imschoot	4 December 1980 (aged 16)			(Royal Belgian Football Association) K.S.K. Beveren
	MF	Kevin Nicolay	6 January 1981 (aged 16)			(Royal Belgian Football Association) R.S.C. Anderlecht
	FW	Tom Raedts	13 August 1981 (aged 15)			(Royal Belgian Football Association) Standard Liège
	FW	Kristof Aelbrecht	5 February 1981 (aged 16)			(Royal Belgian Football Association) K.V. Mechelen
	FW	Thomas Chatelle	31 March 1981 (aged 16)			(Royal Belgian Football Association) K.V. Mechelen
	FW	Thomas Eder	25 December 1980 (aged 16)			(Royal Belgian Football Association) SV Austria Salzburg
	FW	Rik Op de Beeck	29 December 1980 (aged 16)			(Royal Belgian Football Association) Sportklub Tongeren
	FW	Bram Vangeel	8 October 1980 (aged 16)			(Royal Belgian Football Association) K. Sint-Truidense V.V.

=== Georgia ===
No.	Pos.	Player	Date of birth (age)	Caps	Goals	Club
	GK	Giorgi Kalandia	23 June 1981 (aged 15)			(Georgian Football Federation) Odishi Zugdidi
	GK	Giorgi Somkhishvili	17 November 1980 (aged 16)			(Georgian Football Federation) Durudji Kvareli
	DF	Oleg Gvelesiani	16 September 1980 (aged 16)			(Georgian Football Federation) Dinamo Tbilisi
	DF	Vladimer Kakashvili	4 September 1980 (aged 16)			(Georgian Football Federation) Dinamo Tbilisi
	DF	Kakha Kutaladze	15 October 1980 (aged 16)			(Georgian Football Federation) Dinamo Tbilisi
	DF	Giorgi Loladze	1 October 1980 (aged 16)			(Georgian Football Federation) Dinamo Tbilisi
	DF	Ediki Sajaia	16 February 1981 (aged 16)			(Georgian Football Federation) Dinamo Tbilisi
	MF	Vladimer Burduli	26 October 1980 (aged 16)			(Georgian Football Federation) Dinamo Tbilisi
	MF	Giorgi Dekanosidze	2 January 1981 (aged 16)			(Georgian Football Federation) Dinamo Tbilisi
	MF	Zurab Khizaneishvili	26 September 1981 (aged 15)			(Georgian Football Federation) Dinamo Tbilisi
	MF	Archil Romanadze	9 October 1980 (aged 16)			(Georgian Football Federation) Dinamo Batumi
	MF	Michail Soselia	25 March 1981 (aged 16)			(Georgian Football Federation) Avaza Tbilisi
	FW	Shalva Aphkhazava	14 August 1980 (aged 16)			(Georgian Football Federation) Dinamo Batumi
	FW	Lasha Jakobia	20 August 1980 (aged 16)			(Royal Belgian Football Association) Standard Liège
	FW	Irakli Shengelia	13 April 1981 (aged 16)			(Georgian Football Federation) Dinamo Tbilisi

=== Hungary ===
No.	Pos.	Player	Date of birth (age)	Caps	Goals	Club
	GK	Tamás Csányi	28 January 1981 (aged 16)			(Hungarian Football Federation) Vác
	GK	Miklos Erdelyi	30 March 1981 (aged 16)			(Hungarian Football Federation) Debrecen
	DF	Balazs Hompoth	13 September 1980 (aged 16)			(Hungarian Football Federation) Egri FC
	DF	Andras Horvath	16 August 1980 (aged 16)			(Hungarian Football Federation) Haladás Szombathely
	DF	Zsolt Kellner	15 October 1980 (aged 16)			(Hungarian Football Federation) Győr
	DF	Roland Kovacs	20 August 1980 (aged 16)			(Hungarian Football Federation) Ferencváros
	MF	Krisztian Szollar	30 August 1980 (aged 16)			(Hungarian Football Federation) Ferencváros
	MF	Tamás Hajnal	15 March 1981 (aged 16)			(Hungarian Football Federation) Ferencváros
	MF	Viktor Keresztes	12 August 1980 (aged 16)			(Hungarian Football Federation) Ferencváros
	MF	György Kormos	11 September 1980 (aged 16)			(Hungarian Football Federation) Kispest Honvéd
	MF	Tibor Tokodi	1 September 1980 (aged 16)			(Hungarian Football Federation) Újpest
	FW	Attila Gollovitzer,	3 October 1980 (aged 16)			(Hungarian Football Federation) Győr
	FW	Zoltan Kiss	18 August 1980 (aged 16)			(Hungarian Football Federation) Debrecen
	FW	Gabor Mogyorodi	16 August 1980 (aged 16)			(French Football Federation) Bordeaux
	FW	Szabolcs Nagy	12 October 1980 (aged 16)			(Hungarian Football Federation) Győr
	FW	Marton Oross	3 March 1981 (aged 16)			(Hungarian Football Federation) Győr

=== Italy ===
No.	Pos.	Player	Date of birth (age)	Caps	Goals	Club
	GK	Andrea Astolfi	12 August 1980 (aged 16)			(Italian Football Federation) Cesena
	GK	Valerio Visconti	20 August 1980 (aged 16)			(Italian Football Federation) Napoli
	DF	Agatino Chiavaro	7 November 1980 (aged 16)			(Italian Football Federation) Acireale
	DF	Andrea Ghidini	18 March 1981 (aged 16)			(Italian Football Federation) Parma
	DF	Simone Mazzei	26 May 1981 (aged 15)			(Italian Football Federation) Lazio
	DF	Olindo Modenese	6 June 1981 (aged 15)			(Italian Football Federation) Torino
	MF	Jerry Basso	27 August 1980 (aged 16)			(Italian Football Federation) Venezia
	MF	Manuele Blasi	17 August 1980 (aged 16)			(Italian Football Federation) Roma
	MF	Simone Bonomi	8 November 1980 (aged 16)			(Italian Football Federation) Milan
	MF	Giuseppe Colucci	24 August 1980 (aged 16)			(Italian Football Federation) Foggia
	MF	Samuele Dalla Bona	6 February 1981 (aged 16)			(Italian Football Federation) Atalanta
	MF	Simone Pelanti	22 January 1981 (aged 16)			(Italian Football Federation) Fiorentina
	FW	Gabriele Capuano	30 July 1981 (aged 15)			(Italian Football Federation) Lucchese
	FW	Alessandro Cesca	1 December 1981 (aged 15)			(Italian Football Federation) Milan
	FW	Gianluca De Angelis	23 May 1981 (aged 15)	7	4	(Italian Football Federation) Parma
	FW	Davide Sinigaglia	29 July 1981 (aged 15)			(Italian Football Federation) Internazionale

== Group D ==
=== Iceland ===
No.	Pos.	Player	Date of birth (age)	Caps	Goals	Club
	GK	Gunnar Bjorn Helgason	13 November 1980 (aged 16)			(Football Association of Iceland) UMF Selfoss
	GK	Stefan Logi Magnusson	September 1980 (aged 16)			(Football Association of Iceland) Fram Reykjavík
	DF	Benedikt Arnason	2 December 1980 (aged 16)			(Football Association of Iceland) FH men's football
	DF	Hjörtur Fjeldsted	13 November 1980 (aged 16)			(Football Association of Iceland) Keflavík
	DF	Jon Fannar Gudmundsson	4 December 1980 (aged 16)			(Football Association of Iceland) UMF Grindavik
	DF	Olafur Gunnarsson	21 November 1980 (aged 16)			(Football Association of Iceland) UMF Stjarnan
	DF	Kristjan Örn Sigurdsson	7 October 1980 (aged 16)			(Football Association of Iceland) KA Akureyri
	MF	Andri Hjörvar Albertssonl	13 August 1980 (aged 16)			(Football Association of Iceland) Þór Akureyri
	MF	Bernhardur Gudmundsson	21 August 1980 (aged 16)			(Football Association of Iceland) UMF Stjarnan
	MF	Dadi Gudmundsson	11 February 1981 (aged 16)			(Football Association of Iceland) Fram Reykjavik
	MF	Pascal Ortner	24 November 1980 (aged 16)			(Austrian Football Association) FC Linz
	MF	Audunn Johannsson	18 September 1980 (aged 16)			(Football Association of Iceland) KR Reykjavik
	MF	Emil Sigurdsson	4 February 1981 (aged 16)			(Football Association of Iceland) IA Akranes
	FW	Thorarinn Kristjansson	30 December 1980 (aged 16)			(Football Association of Iceland) Keflavík
	FW	Indridi Sigurdsson	12 January 1981 (aged 16)			(Football Association of Iceland) KR Reykjavik
	FW	Olafur Snorrason	22 April 1982 (aged 15)			(Football Association of Iceland) Fjölnir Reykjavik

=== Slovakia ===
No.	Pos.	Player	Date of birth (age)	Caps	Goals	Club
	GK	Marian Fedor	14 September 1980 (aged 16)			(Slovak Football Association) Bardejov
	GK	Maroš Ferenc	19 February 1981 (aged 16)			(Slovak Football Association) Tatran Prešov
	DF	Michal Hanek	18 September 1980 (aged 16)			(Slovak Football Association) FC Nitra
	DF	Tomáš Komora	4 December 1980 (aged 16)			(Slovak Football Association) Dukla Banská Bystrica
	DF	Marek Krejčí	20 November 1980 (aged 16)			(Slovak Football Association) Inter Slovnaft Bratislava
	DF	Slavomír Lukáč	8 December 1980 (aged 16)			(Slovak Football Association) FC Nitra
	DF	Zoltán Sováb	8 May 1981 (aged 15)			(Slovak Football Association) Vác FC
	MF	Ivan Balcír	20 September 1980 (aged 16)			(Slovak Football Association) Považská Bystrica
	MF	Branislav Čobrda	26 September 1980 (aged 16)			(Slovak Football Association) Spartak Trnava
	MF	Peter Hrubina	30 December 1980 (aged 16)			(Slovak Football Association) Petrimex Prievidza
	MF	František Kalmán	30 September 1980 (aged 16)			(Slovak Football Association) ŠK Slovan Bratislava
	MF	Juraj Lešták	12 February 1981 (aged 16)			(Slovak Football Association) Dukla Banská Bystrica
	FW	Branislav Fodrek	5 February 1981 (aged 16)			(Slovak Football Association) FK Rapid Bratislava
	FW	Marcel Majoroš	9 October 1980 (aged 16)			(Royal Dutch Football Association) PSV Eindhoven
	FW	Attila Vendeghi	12 March 1981 (aged 16)			(Slovak Football Association) ŠK Slovan Bratislava
	FW	Radoslav Zabavník	16 September 1980 (aged 16)			(Slovak Football Association) 1. FC Košice

=== Slovenia ===
No.	Pos.	Player	Date of birth (age)	Caps	Goals	Club
	GK	Damir Botonjic	14 September 1981 (aged 15)			(Football Association of Slovenia) Svoboda
	GK	Amir Duratovic	1 November 1980 (aged 16)			(Football Association of Slovenia) Olimpija
	DF	Dejan Balazic	23 September 1980 (aged 16)			(Football Association of Slovenia) Olimpija
	DF	Marko Fajdiga	28 December 1980 (aged 16)			(Football Association of Slovenia) Mura
	DF	Primoz Florjanc	11 May 1981 (aged 15)			(Football Association of Slovenia) Rudar Trbovlje
	DF	Slavisa Jevdzenic	20 March 1981 (aged 16)			(Football Association of Slovenia) Maribor
	DF	Dragoljub Nikolic	26 October 1980 (aged 16)			(Football Association of Slovenia) Gorica
	MF	Jure Bauman	10 October 1980 (aged 16)			(Football Association of Slovenia) Triglav Kranj
	MF	Mitja Hojnik	3 January 1981 (aged 16)			(Football Association of Slovenia) Rudar Velenje
	MF	Blaz Pate	14 September 1980 (aged 16)			(Football Association of Slovenia) Olimpija
	MF	Igor Preininger	4 January 1981 (aged 16)			(Football Association of Slovenia) Mura
	MF	Miodrag Vujovic	20 February 1981 (aged 16)			(Football Association of Slovenia) Triglav Kranj
	FW	Miha Golob	9 December 1980 (aged 16)			(Football Association of Slovenia) NK Factor Ježica
	FW	Andrej Kvas	2 December 1980 (aged 16)			(Football Association of Slovenia) Maribor
	FW	Klemen Lavric	12 June 1981 (aged 15)			(Football Association of Slovenia) Rudar Trbovlje
	FW	Matej Skafar	7 December 1980 (aged 16)			(Football Association of Slovenia) Beltinci

=== Turkey ===
No.	Pos.	Player	Date of birth (age)	Caps	Goals	Club
	GK	Orkun Usak	5 November 1980 (aged 16)			(Turkish Football Federation) Galatasaray S.K
	GK	Yasin Yildizi	30 September 1980 (aged 16)			(Turkish Football Federation) Beşiktaş Istanbul
	DF	Ozan Akbulut	10 December 1980 (aged 16)			(Turkish Football Federation) Salihli Belediye
	DF	Mustafa Macit Güven	2 August 1980 (aged 16)			(Turkish Football Federation) Akcaabat Sebatspor
	DF	Rifat Özdemir	5 May 1981 (aged 15)			(Turkish Football Federation) Aydinspor
	DF	Kadir Öztürk	6 August 1980 (aged 16)			(Turkish Football Federation) Trabzonspor
	DF	Ömer Topraktepe	1 August 1980 (aged 16)			(Turkish Football Federation) Karagümrük
	DF	Alper Ukuser	13 September 1980 (aged 16)			(Turkish Football Federation) Bursaspor
	MF	Faruk Atalay	18 March 1981 (aged 16)			(Turkish Football Federation) Galatasaray S.K
	MF	Emre Belözoglui	7 September 1980 (aged 16)			(Turkish Football Federation) Galatasaray S.K
	MF	Kamil Durmus	15 May 1981 (aged 15)			(Turkish Football Federation) Bursaspor
	MF	Hasan Üçüncü	16 November 1980 (aged 16)			(Turkish Football Federation) Trabzonspor
	FW	Okan Cebi	15 August 1980 (aged 16)			(Turkish Football Federation) Trabzonspor
	FW	Berkant Göktan	12 December 1980 (aged 16)			(German Football Association) Bayern München
	FW	Güvenc Özkan	5 September 1980 (aged 16)			(Turkish Football Federation) Fenerbahçe Istanbul
	FW	Volkan Sahinel	2 November 1980 (aged 16)			(Turkish Football Federation) Sakaryaspor
