= Antonio Dubé de Luque =

Spanish religious sculptor (1943–2019)

- Born: Antonio Joaquín Dubé de Luque; 24 December 1943; Sevilla
- Died: 7 November 2019 (aged 75)
- Occupation: Sculptor

Antonio Joaquín Dubé de Luque (Sevilla, 23 December 1943 - 7 November 2019) was a Spanish religious sculptor.

== Biography ==
He received artistic teaching from the painters Juan Miguel Sánchez, Eduardo Acosta and Miguel Pérez Aguilera, as well as the sculptor Manuel Echegoyán. His work consists mainly of carvings of a religious character in wood, many of which procession in different localities of Spain during Holy Week. He was also a posterist, painter, designer and restauraterist. He died at the age of seventy-five on 7 November 2019 at the Virgen del Rocío Hospital in Seville after a long illness.

== Works ==
- Santa María de Consolación (1969), titular de la Hermandad de La Sed (Sevilla).
- María Santísima de la Soledad Coronada (1972), titular de la Real Hermandad de la Vera-Cruz de Salteras (Sevilla).
- Virgen de la Paz (1974), titular de la Hermandad de la Borriquilla (Granada).
- Nuestra Señora del Amor (1977), titular de la Hermandad del Gran Poder San Fernando (Cádiz).
- Nuestra Señora de la Aurora (1978), titular de la Hermandad de La Resurrección (Sevilla).
- María Santísima de la Estrella (1980), titular de la Cofradía de nazarenos de Nuestro Padre Jesús de la Pasión y Mª Stma. de la Estrella, del Albayzin (Granada).
- Virgen de Lágrimas y Favores (1981), titular de las Reales Cofradías Fusionadas (Málaga).
- Virgen del Amor (1981), titular de la Cofradía de Jesús "El Rico" (Málaga).
- Virgen del Mayor Dolor (1982), titular de las Reales Cofradías Fusionadas (Málaga).
- Virgen de los Dolores en su Amparo y Misericordia (1983), titular de la Hermandad de la Santa Cruz (Málaga).
- Virgen del Patrocinio (1984), titular de la Hermandad de la Salutación (Málaga).
- Jesús Nazareno de la Salutación (1984), titular de la Hermandad de la Salutación (Málaga).
- Señor de los Reyes (1987), titular de Hermandad de la Vera Cruz (Córdoba).
- Señor Nazareno de la Santa Faz (1988), titular de Hermandad de la Santa Faz (Córdoba).
- María Santísima del Mayor Dolor en su Soledad (1988), titular de la Hermandad de la Crucifixión (Málaga).
- Nuestra Señora de la Esperanza (1989), titular Paso Morado Tabernas. (Tabernas, Almería).
- Virgen de la Victoria (1991), titular de la Cofradía del Resucitado (Ayamonte).
- Misterio de la Sagrada Cena (Señor de la Eucaristía (1995), secundarias (1995-2005)), y Nuestra Señora del Sagrario (1998), Cofradía de la Sagrada Cena, Cáceres.
- Cristo del Amor y Virgen de la Piedad (1995), conjunto escultórico de la Cofradía de la Piedad, Arahal, (Sevilla).
- Virgen de la Merced (1996), titular de la Cofradía del Prendimiento (Almería).
- Virgen de los Ángeles (1997), titular de la Cofradía de los Ángeles (Almería).
- Virgen de las Maravillas (1997), titular de la Asociación Las Maravillas (Sevilla).
- Bautismo de Jesús (2000), grupo escultórico que procesiona en la Semana Santa de Cuenca.
- Jesús de la Pasión (2000), titular de la Hermandad de la Pasión (Plasencia, Cáceres).
- Jesús de la Salud (2002), titular de la Hermandad de la Borriquilla (Jaén).
- Virgen del Rosario (2002), titular de la Hermandad de la Pasión (Plasencia, Cáceres).
- Señor de la Sentencia, titular de la hermandad de la Macarena (Almería).
- Mº Santísima de la Esperanza Macarena, titular de la hermandad de la Macarena (Almería).
- Jesús de los Afligidos en su Humillación (2009), titular de la Asociación Las Maravillas (Sevilla).
