= Cifu =

Cifu may refer to:

- Cifu (footballer, born 1980), full name Daniel Cifuentes Alfaro, Spanish footballer
- Cifu (footballer, born 1990), full name Miguel Ángel Garrido Cifuentes, Spanish footballer
