= Fernando Vega (footballer, born 1984) =

Spanish footballer

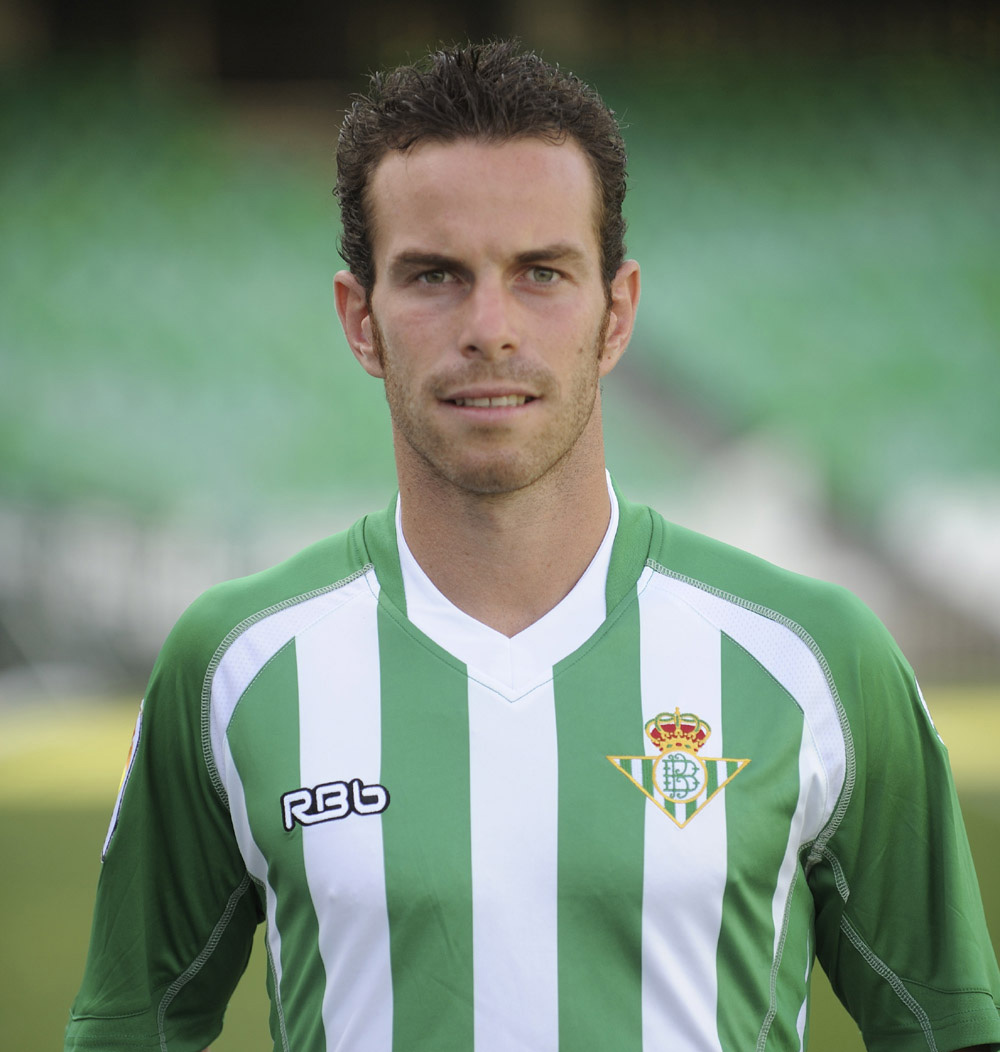
- Vega with Betis in 2010

Personal information
- Full name: Fernando Vega Torres
- Date of birth: 3 July 1984 (age 42)
- Place of birth: Arahal, Spain
- Height: 1.77 m (5 ft 10 in)
- Position: Left-back

Youth career
- 1998–2003: Sevilla

Senior career*
Years	Team	Apps	(Gls)
2003–2005	Sevilla B	71	(0)
2005–2006	Lorca Deportiva	39	(0)
2006–2011	Betis	115	(2)
2012–2015	Recreativo	77	(4)
2015–2016	Lugo	5	(0)
Total		307	(6)

International career
2002	Spain U20	3	(0)
2004	Spain U21	1	(0)
- * Club domestic league appearances and goals

Fernando Vega Torres (born 3 July 1984) is a Spanish former professional footballer who played as a left-back.

He totalled 79 matches in La Liga over three seasons, with Betis.

== Club career ==
Born in Arahal, Province of Seville, Vega started his career with Sevilla FC, playing two full seasons for its B team in the Segunda División B. In 2005–06 he represented modest Lorca Deportiva CF in the Segunda División, with the side finishing fifth but being relegated the campaign after his departure.

Vega joined Real Betis in July 2006 on a free transfer, and eventually became first choice at the Andalusia club in his first season after beating competition from veteran Enrique Romero. He appeared in 31 La Liga matches apiece the following two years, and his team would be relegated in the second; he made his debut in the Spanish top flight on 26 August 2006, coming on as a late substitute in a 2–1 away loss against Valencia CF.

On 31 August 2011, after participating in only six league games (out of 42) as the Verdiblancos returned to the top division after a two-year absence, Vega was released even though he had a contract running until June 2014. In early January 2012, following an unsuccessful trial with England's Portsmouth, he signed for neighbouring Recreativo de Huelva of the second tier.

On 31 August 2015, having suffered relegation with Recre, Vega moved to CD Lugo also in the second division.

== International career ==
Vega earned his only cap for Spain at under-21 level on 17 February 2004, as a late substitute in the 2–1 friendly win over Norway.
