= Jesús Tato =

Spanish footballer (born 1983)

Personal information
- Full name: Jesús Rodríguez Tato
- Date of birth: 12 July 1983 (age 43)
- Place of birth: Murcia, Spain
- Height: 1.79 m (5 ft 10 1/2 in)
- Position: Striker

Team information
- Current team: Shijiazhuang Gongfu (manager)

Youth career
- Murcia
- Barcelona

Senior career*
Years	Team	Apps	(Gls)
2002–2004	Barcelona C	38	(11)
2004–2008	Murcia	23	(5)
2007	→ Lleida (loan)	13	(3)
2007–2008	→ Ceuta (loan)	37	(6)
2008–2010	Cartagena	67	(11)
2010–2011	Albacete	37	(13)
2011–2013	Xerez	53	(9)
2013	Las Palmas	28	(5)
2014	Girona	12	(0)
2014–2015	Zaragoza	16	(0)
2015–2016	Moghreb Tétouan	7	(1)
2016	Pune City	10	(1)
2017	La Roda	8	(0)
2017–2018	Lincoln Red Imps	2	(0)
Total		351	(65)

International career
1999	Spain U16	2	(0)
2002	Spain U20	3	(0)

Managerial career
- 2018–2020: Goa (assistant)
- 2020–2021: Mumbai City (assistant)
- 2022–2023: Sichuan Jiuniu (assistant)
- 2023–2024: Shenzhen Peng City
- 2026–: Shijiazhuang Gongfu
- * Club domestic league appearances and goals

Jesús Rodríguez Tato (born 12 July 1983) is a Spanish former professional footballer who played as a striker. He is the manager of China League One club Shijiazhuang Gongfu.

He spent most of his career in the Segunda División, totalling 191 games and 35 goals in total of seven teams across nine seasons. He also represented clubs in Morocco and India.

== Playing career ==
=== Murcia ===
Born in Murcia, Tato began his development at Real Murcia CF and concluded it at FC Barcelona, where he made his senior debut for the reserves in the Tercera División. In 2004, he returned to his hometown team in La Liga and made his professional debut on 28 March in a 2–0 home win against RCD Mallorca, coming on as a 74th-minute substitute for Juanma; he made six further appearances off the bench, as the season ended with relegation.

Tato scored his first professional goal on 6 May 2006, a consolation in a 2–1 away loss to CD Castellón in the Segunda División. He followed it eight days later with a brace in a 3–1 victory over CD Numancia at the Estadio de La Condomina, also providing an assist for Nacho Garro.

Halfway through Murcia's promotion-winning season, Tato returned to Catalonia by joining Segunda División B team UE Lleida on loan. The following campaign, he remained in the same level at AD Ceuta, helping them to the play-offs.

=== Journeyman ===
In 2008, Tato signed with neighbours FC Cartagena, and renewed his link after winning promotion to division two via the play-offs in his first season. After a second campaign at the Estadio Cartagonova he moved to Albacete Balompié, where he netted a career-best 13 goals in his only season, which ended in relegation from the second tier.

Tato joined Xerez CD in June 2011, being officially presented on 8 July and hoping to help them gain promotion to the top flight, but he left in January 2013 for fellow second division side UD Las Palmas for the same reason. He extended his contract at the latter club in the summer, after helping it to the play-offs.

In February 2014, Tato signed for Girona FC for the remainder of the season, and remained a free agent from then until September, when he joined Real Zaragoza still in the second tier.

In July 2015, Tato moved abroad for the first time in his career at the age of 32, joining Morocco's MA Tétouan alongside countryman José Manuel Rueda. He switched to a third continent in September 2016, signing for FC Pune City ahead of the Indian Super League season. He played all but four games for the latter, who missed out on the play-offs, and headed the opening goal of a 1–1 draw at Delhi Dynamos FC on 27 October.

== Coaching career ==
After retiring, Tato worked as assistant manager under his compatriot Sergio Lobera at FC Goa. On 31 January 2020, the pair left the Fatorda Stadium, resuming their association at Mumbai City FC also of the Indian top flight and China League One side Shenzhen Peng City FC.

On 30 April 2026, Tato was named as the new head coach of Shijiazhuang Gongfu F.C. also in the Chinese second tier.

== Honours ==
=== Manager ===
Shenzhen Peng City

- China League One: 2023
