= Marquitos (footballer, born 1987) =

Spanish footballer

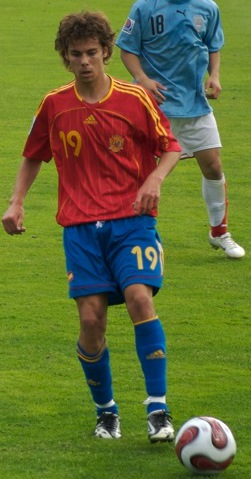
- Marcos at the 2007 FIFA U-20 World Cup

Personal information
- Full name: Marcos García Barreno
- Date of birth: 21 March 1987 (age 39)
- Place of birth: Sant Antoni, Spain
- Height: 1.72 m (5 ft 8 in)
- Position: Midfielder

Team information
- Current team: Ibiza Islas Pitiusas
- Number: 10

Youth career
- Villarreal

Senior career*
| Years | Team | Apps | (Gls) |
| 2005–2006 | Villarreal B | 38 | (6) |
| 2006–2009 | Villarreal | 29 | (3) |
| 2007–2008 | → Recreativo (loan) | 19 | (1) |
| 2008–2009 | → Real Sociedad (loan) | 38 | (4) |
| 2009–2012 | Valladolid | 43 | (3) |
| 2010–2011 | → Villarreal B (loan) | 38 | (2) |
| 2012–2013 | Xerez | 30 | (4) |
| 2013–2014 | Ponferradina | 28 | (2) |
| 2014–2015 | Sabadell | 27 | (1) |
| 2015–2016 | Miedź Legnica | 10 | (3) |
| 2016 | Górnik Łęczna | 5 | (0) |
| 2016 | Beroe | 3 | (0) |
| 2017–2020 | Miedź Legnica | 84 | (22) |
| 2021 | Melilla | 3 | (0) |
| 2021– | Ibiza Islas Pitiusas | 126 | (23) |

International career
| 2002–2003 | Spain U16 | 8 | (2) |
| 2004–2005 | Spain U17 | 13 | (3) |
| 2004–2006 | Spain U19 | 2 | (0) |
| 2007 | Spain U20 | 4 | (1) |
Medal record
Men's football
Representing Spain
UEFA European Under-17 Championship
| Runner-up | 2004 France |
- * Club domestic league appearances and goals as of 15 May 2026

Marcos García Barreno (born 21 March 1987), known as Marquitos, is a Spanish professional footballer who plays for Ibiza Islas Pitiusas as a midfielder.

== Club career ==
Born in Sant Antoni de Portmany, Ibiza, Balearic Islands, Marquitos was a product of Villarreal CF's youth system, and he made his first-team debut on 24 September 2006 in a 3–2 home win against Real Zaragoza. During the season he was an important attacking weapon for the fifth-placed side in La Liga and, in two starts, scored goals in home victories over Real Madrid (1–0) and FC Barcelona (2–0), playing 90 minutes on both occasions.

However, Marquitos would be loaned for 2007–08 to Recreativo de Huelva also in the top division, where he only appeared in half of the campaign's matches, with a goal against Real Murcia CF (4–2 home win). He returned to Villarreal only to be immediately loaned again, to Segunda División's Real Sociedad; he featured heavily during this spell, but the Basque team failed to achieve a top-flight return.

In late July 2009, Villarreal released Marquitos, whom immediately signed a four-year contract with top-tier Real Valladolid as well as former teammate César Arzo. On 17 October he netted again against Real Madrid, albeit in a 4–2 away defeat, but appeared sparingly throughout the season as the Castile and León side was eventually relegated.

Marquitos returned to Villarreal in the summer of 2010, on loan, but was assigned to the reserve squad in division two. He continued competing at that level the following years, with Xerez CD, SD Ponferradina and CE Sabadell FC.

In 2015 off-season, aged 28, Marquitos moved abroad for the first time, joining Polish club Miedź Legnica. The following January, he moved to the country's Ekstraklasa with GKS Górnik Łęczna.

In September 2016, Marquitos moved to the First Professional Football League (Bulgaria) with PFC Beroe Stara Zagora. He was released in December, and returned to Miedź.

== Career statistics ==
As of match played 23 May 2021

Appearances and goals by club, season and competition
| Club | Season | League | | | National Cup | | Continental | | Total | |
| Club | Season | Division | Apps | Goals | Apps | Goals | Apps | Goals | Apps | Goals |
|---|---|---|---|---|---|---|---|---|---|---|
| Villarreal | 2004–05 | La Liga | 0 | 0 | 0 | 0 | 3 (Note: Appearances in UEFA Cup) | 0 | 3 | 0 |
| Villarreal | 2005–06 | La Liga | 0 | 0 | 0 | 0 | — | | 0 | 0 |
| Villarreal | 2006–07 | La Liga | 29 | 3 | 4 | 0 | 1 (Note: Appearance in UEFA Intertoto Cup) | 0 | 34 | 3 |
| Villarreal | Total | | 29 | 3 | 4 | 0 | 4 | 0 | 37 | 3 |
| Recreativo (loan) | 2007–08 | La Liga | 19 | 1 | 4 | 1 | — | | 23 | 2 |
| Real Sociedad (loan) | 2008–09 | Segunda División | 38 | 4 | 2 | 1 | — | | 40 | 5 |
| Valladolid | 2009–10 | La Liga | 19 | 2 | 2 | 0 | — | | 21 | 2 |
| Valladolid | 2011–12 | Segunda División | 24 | 1 | 1 | 1 | — | | 25 | 2 |
| Valladolid | Total | | 43 | 3 | 3 | 1 | 0 | 0 | 46 | 4 |
| Villarreal B (loan) | 2010–11 | Segunda División | 38 | 2 | — | | — | | 38 | 2 |
| Xerez | 2012–13 | Segunda División | 30 | 4 | 1 | 0 | — | | 31 | 4 |
| Ponferradina | 2013–14 | Segunda División | 28 | 2 | 1 | 0 | — | | 29 | 2 |
| Sabadell | 2014–15 | Segunda División | 27 | 1 | 3 | 0 | — | | 30 | 1 |
| Miedź Legnica | 2015–16 | I liga | 10 | 3 | 0 | 0 | — | | 10 | 3 |
| Górnik Łęczna | 2015–16 | Ekstraklasa | 5 | 0 | 0 | 0 | — | | 5 | 0 |
| Beroe | 2016–17 | First League | 3 | 0 | 1 | 0 | — | | 4 | 0 |
| Miedź Legnica | 2016–17 | I liga | 13 | 2 | 0 | 0 | — | | 13 | 2 |
| Miedź Legnica | 2017–18 | I liga | 29 | 8 | 2 | 0 | — | | 31 | 8 |
| Miedź Legnica | 2018–19 | Ekstraklasa | 10 | 2 | 1 | 0 | — | | 11 | 2 |
| Miedź Legnica | 2019–20 | I liga | 32 | 10 | 3 | 0 | — | | 35 | 10 |
| Miedź Legnica | Total | | 84 | 22 | 6 | 0 | 0 | 0 | 90 | 22 |
| Melilla | 2020–21 | Segunda División B | 3 | 0 | 0 | 0 | — | | 3 | 0 |
| Career total | | | 357 | 45 | 25 | 3 | 4 | 0 | 386 | 48 |

== Honours ==
Miedź Legnica

- I liga: 2017–18
