= Borja Granero =

Spanish footballer (born 1990)

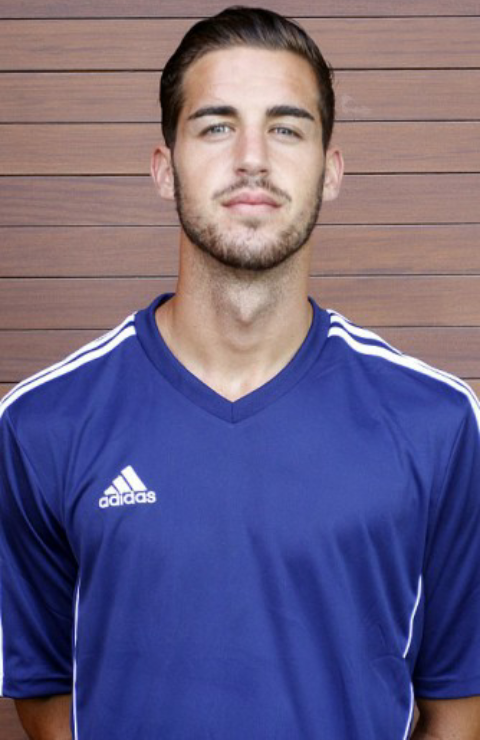
- Granero in 2015

Personal information
- Full name: Borja Granero Niñerola
- Date of birth: 30 June 1990 (age 36)
- Place of birth: Valencia, Spain
- Height: 1.89 m (6 ft 2 in)
- Position: Centre-back

Team information
- Current team: Avilés
- Number: 12

Youth career
- Valencia

Senior career*
Years	Team	Apps	(Gls)
2009–2011	Valencia B	9	(1)
2009–2010	→ Villajoyosa (loan)	23	(3)
2011–2013	Recreativo	25	(1)
2013–2018	Racing Santander	124	(15)
2018–2020	Extremadura	71	(1)
2020–2023	Deportivo La Coruña	40	(3)
2023–2024	Castellón	31	(0)
2024–2025	Alcoyano	18	(0)
2025	Gimnàstic	5	(0)
2025–	Avilés	18	(0)
- * Club domestic league appearances and goals as of 13:18, 24 February 2026 (UTC)

Borja Granero Niñerola (born 30 June 1990) is a Spanish professional footballer who plays mainly as a central defender but also as a defensive midfielder for Primera Federación club Avilés.

== Club career ==
Born in Valencia, Granero finished his development at local giants Valencia CF. He made his senior debut with neighbouring Villajoyosa CF in the 2009–10 season, suffering relegation from Segunda División B.

In late January 2011, after returning to the Che, with the reserves in the Tercera División, Granero was sold to Recreativo de Huelva of Segunda División. He made his official debut for his new club on 29 May in a 2–0 away loss against Villarreal CF B, one of only two league appearances during the campaign.

On 30 July 2013, after being rarely used, Granero signed with Racing de Santander, recently relegated to the third division. A regular starter, he achieved promotion to the second tier in his first season but was relegated in the second.

Granero returned to division two on 24 July 2018, after agreeing to a contract with Extremadura UD. On 3 September 2020, after suffering relegation, he signed a three-year deal with Deportivo de La Coruña who also went down.

Granero continued to compete in the Primera Federación the following years, representing CD Castellón, CD Alcoyano and Gimnàstic de Tarragona.

== Personal life ==
Granero's father, José Carlos, was also a footballer. He too was developed at Valencia.

== Career statistics ==
As of match played 9 May 2021

Appearances and goals by club, season and competition
Club	Season	League			National Cup		Other		Total	
Club	Season	Division	Apps	Goals	Apps	Goals	Apps	Goals	Apps	Goals
Villajoyosa (loan)	2009–10	Segunda División B	23	3	1	0	—		24	3
Recreativo	2010–11	Segunda División	2	0	0	0	—		2	0
Recreativo	2011–12	Segunda División	14	0	1	0	—		15	0
Recreativo	2012–13	Segunda División	9	1	1	0	—		10	1
Recreativo	Total		25	1	2	0	0	0	27	1
Racing Santander	2013–14	Segunda División B	32	4	8	0	4 (Note: Appearances in Segunda División B play-offs)	0	44	4
Racing Santander	2014–15	Segunda División	27	3	0	0	—		27	3
Racing Santander	2015–16	Segunda División B	26	3	0	0	4	0	30	3
Racing Santander	2016–17	Segunda División B	11	1	1	0	6	1	18	2
Racing Santander	2017–18	Segunda División B	28	4	0	0	—		28	4
Racing Santander	Total		124	15	9	0	14	1	147	16
Extremadura	2018–19	Segunda División	31	1	1	0	—		32	1
Extremadura	2019–20	Segunda División	40	0	0	0	—		40	0
Extremadura	Total		71	1	1	0	0	0	72	1
Deportivo La Coruña	2020–21	Segunda División B	23	0	1	0	—		24	0
Career total			266	20	14	0	14	1	294	21
