= Jordi Matamala =

Spanish footballer

Personal information
- Full name: Jordi Matamala Muntadas
- Date of birth: 18 May 1976 (age 50)
- Place of birth: Vilobí d'Onyar, Spain
- Height: 1.82 m (6 ft 0 in)
- Position: Midfielder

Youth career
- Vilobí

Senior career*
Years	Team	Apps	(Gls)
1995–2000	Vilobí	200	(37)
2000–2002	Hospitalet	67	(5)
2002–2006	Girona	141	(5)
2006–2007	Palamós	34	(1)
2007–2010	Girona	109	(6)
2010–2013	Recreativo	94	(5)
2013–2014	Girona	32	(1)
2014–2016	Palamós	70	(1)
Total		747	(61)

International career
2008	Catalonia	1	(0)
- * Club domestic league appearances and goals

Jordi Matamala Muntadas (born 18 May 1976) is a Spanish former professional footballer who played as a central midfielder.

He amassed Segunda División totals of 199 matches and ten goals over six seasons, representing in the competition Girona and Recreativo (three years apiece).

== Club career ==
Born in Vilobí d'Onyar, Girona, Catalonia, Matamala reached Segunda División for the first time in 2008–09 at the age of 32, with Girona FC, which he had helped promote from Segunda División B the previous year. In the following two seasons, he was again an undisputed started for the club as it consecutively managed to retain its league status; he made his debut in the second tier on 30 August 2008, playing the full 90 minutes and being booked in a 1–0 away win against RC Celta de Vigo.

Matamala signed for another side in that league in summer 2010, Recreativo de Huelva. He started in 26 matches in his first year (2,318 minutes of action), and the team finished in 12th position.

On 26 July 2014, the 38-year-old Matamala returned to Palamós CF who still competed in the Tercera División, joining from Girona. He retired after two campaigns with the club in that level.
