= Vyacheslav Zapoyaska =

Ukrainian footballer

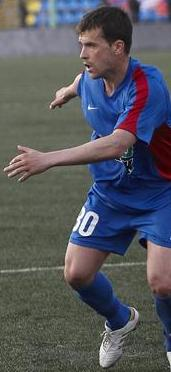
- Zapoyaska with SKA-Energiya Khabarovsk in 2009

Personal information
- Full name: Vyacheslav Alekseyevich Zapoyaska
- Date of birth: 24 August 1980 (age 46)
- Place of birth: Kharkiv, Ukrainian SSR
- Height: 1.70 m (5 ft 7 in)
- Position: Midfielder

Team information
- Current team: Academy Torpedo Moscow

Youth career
- Metalist Kharkiv

Senior career*
Years	Team	Apps	(Gls)
1996–2002	Metalist Kharkiv	52	(2)
1996–1997	→ Avanhard Merefa	2	(0)
1997–2002	→ Metalist-2 Kharkiv	73	(13)
2002–2003	Sokol Saratov	32	(0)
2004	MTZ-RIPO Minsk	15	(2)
2005	Volgar-Gazprom Astrakhan	12	(1)
2006	Kharkiv-2	12	(2)
2006	Helios Kharkiv	12	(0)
2007	Hazovyk-KhGV Kharkiv	8	(2)
2007–2008	Helios Kharkiv	11	(0)
2008	Enerhetyk Komsomolske (amateur)		
2009–2011	SKA-Energiya Khabarovsk	95	(21)
2013–2014	Kolos Zapchepylivka (amateur)		
2017	Kvadro Pervomaiskyi (amateur)		
2018	Naftovyk-Ukrnafta Okhtyrka	0	(0)
2020	Skif Shulhynka (amateur)		

International career
2000–2001	Ukraine U-21	4	(1)

Managerial career
- 2022–2023: Strogino Moscow (assistant)
- 2023–2024: DYuSSh Strogino Moscow
- 2025–: Academy Torpedo Moscow
- * Club domestic league appearances and goals

Vyacheslav Alekseyevich Zapoyaska (Ukrainian: Вячеслав Олексійович Запояска; born 24 August 1980) is a Ukrainian former professional footballer.

== Career ==
He made his debut in the Russian Premier League in 2002 for FC Sokol Saratov.
