= José Manuel Rueda =

Spanish footballer (born 1988)

Personal information
- Full name: José Manuel Rueda Sampedro
- Date of birth: 30 January 1988 (age 38)
- Place of birth: Linares, Spain
- Height: 1.78 m (5 ft 10 in)
- Position: Midfielder

Team information
- Current team: Olímpic Xàtiva

Youth career
- 2001–2007: Barcelona

Senior career*
Years	Team	Apps	(Gls)
2007–2010	Barcelona B	83	(5)
2008	Barcelona	1	(0)
2010–2011	Omonia	17	(3)
2011–2013	Xerez	52	(5)
2013–2015	Ponferradina	43	(0)
2015–2016	Moghreb Tétouan		
2017	Linares Deportivo	11	(0)
2017–2018	Peña Deportiva	27	(2)
2018–	Olímpic Xàtiva	56	(2)

International career
2004	Spain U16	1	(1)
- * Club domestic league appearances and goals as of 8 March 2020

José Manuel Rueda Sampedro (born 30 January 1988) is a Spanish footballer who plays for CD Olímpic de Xàtiva as a midfielder.

== Club career ==
Rueda was born in Linares, Jaén, Andalusia. After arriving in FC Barcelona's youth system at the age of 13, he played three years with the B-team, two of those in the third division. On 17 May 2008 he made his La Liga debut, coming on as a substitute for Eiður Guðjohnsen for the final 15 minutes of a 5–3 away win against Real Murcia – in the season's last round – with the title race already decided in the Catalans' favour.

In 2009–10, Rueda was one of the most important attacking players of the reserve side led by former Barcelona player Luis Enrique, scoring four goals as they returned to the second level after an 11-year absence. During the campaign, he was also named team captain.

In June 2010, alongside two other compatriots, including former Barcelona B teammate Víctor Espasandín, Rueda signed with Cypriot club AC Omonia. He won the league in his first and only season before returning to his country's division two with Xerez CD, being relegated in 2013.

On 14 June 2013, Rueda moved to fellow league club SD Ponferradina on a one-year deal. He in fact stayed for two, before leaving abroad for a second time on 13 July 2015 and joining Morocco's Moghreb Tétouan alongside compatriot Jesús Tato.

In January 2017, Rueda signed for his hometown team Linares Deportivo in the third tier.

== Club statistics ==
As of 30 October 2011

Club	Season	League		Cup		Europe		Total	
Club	Season	Apps	Goals	Apps	Goals	Apps	Goals	Apps	Goals
Barcelona B	2007–08	20	0	-	-	-	-	20	0
Barcelona B	2008–09	25	1	-	-	-	-	25	1
Barcelona B	2009–10	38	4	-	-	-	-	38	4
Barcelona B	Total	83	5	-	-	-	-	83	5
Barcelona	2007–08	1	0	0	0	0	0	1	0
Barcelona	Total	1	0	0	0	0	0	1	0
Omonia	2010–11	17	3	?	?	3	0	20	3
Omonia	Total	17	3	?	?	3	0	20	3
Xerez	2011–12	26	2	0	0	-	-	26	2
Xerez	2012–13	26	3	1	0	-	-	27	3
Xerez	Total	52	5	1	0	-	-	53	5
Ponferradina	2013–14	23	0	1	0	-	-	24	0
Ponferradina	2014–15	20	0	0	0	-	-	20	0
Ponferradina	Total	43	0	1	0	-	-	44	0
Career totals		196	13	2	0	3	0	200	13

== Honours ==
Omonia

- Cypriot Cup: 2010–11
- Cypriot Super Cup: 2010
