= Adri Ruiz =

Spanish footballer

Personal information
- Full name: Adrián Ruiz Ortiz
- Date of birth: 21 August 1988 (age 38)
- Place of birth: Málaga, Spain
- Height: 1.65 m (5 ft 5 in)
- Position: Midfielder

Team information
- Current team: Alhaurín Torre

Youth career
- 2006–2007: 26 de Febrero

Senior career*
Years	Team	Apps	(Gls)
2007–2008	Priego		
2008–2009	Atlético Lauro		
2009	Malaka		
2009–2010	Marbella	28	(2)
2010	Caravaca	12	(0)
2011	Estepona	11	(0)
2011–2012	Málaga B	33	(9)
2012–2013	Xerez	18	(0)
2013–2014	El Palo	16	(0)
2014–2015	Alhaurín Torre	18	(3)
2015	Lucena	15	(0)
2015–2017	Alhaurín Torre	43	(4)
2017	Vélez	13	(1)
2017–2018	Malaka	13	(4)
2019–	Alhaurín Torre	2	(0)
- * Club domestic league appearances and goals as of 22 September 2019

Adrián "Adri" Ruiz Ortiz (born 21 August 1988 in Málaga, Andalusia) is a Spanish footballer plays for Alhaurín de la Torre CF as a left midfielder.
