= Mateusz Sławik =

Polish footballer

Personal information
- Date of birth: 3 November 1980 (age 45)
- Place of birth: Katowice, Poland
- Height: 1.83 m (6 ft 0 in)
- Position: Goalkeeper

Team information
- Current team: Poland U15 (goalkeeping coach)

Senior career*
Years	Team	Apps	(Gls)
1999–2000	GKS Katowice		
2000–2004	MK Górnik Katowice		
2004–2005	GKS Katowice	19	(0)
2005	Polonia Warsaw	1	(0)
2006–2008	Górnik Zabrze	33	(0)
2009	Odra Opole	8	(0)
2009–2010	GKS Jastrzębie	8	(0)
2010	Górnik Wesoła		(1)
2011–2013	Górnik Zabrze	0	(0)
2013	Rozwój Katowice	17	(0)
- * Club domestic league appearances and goals

Mateusz Sławik (born 3 November 1980) is a Polish former professional footballer who played as a goalkeeper. He currently serves as the goalkeeping coach of the Poland national under-15 team.

== Career ==
His former clubs were Polonia Warsaw and GKS Katowice.

In February 2011, he signed a half-year contract with Górnik Zabrze.
