= Rafa García (footballer) =

Spanish footballer (born 1986)

Personal information
- Full name: Rafael García García
- Date of birth: 14 January 1986 (age 40)
- Place of birth: Ciudad Real, Spain
- Height: 1.88 m (6 ft 2 in)
- Position: Midfielder

Youth career
- 1998–2000: Albacete
- 2000–2001: Ciudad Real
- 2001–2005: Real Madrid

Senior career*
Years	Team	Apps	(Gls)
2005	S.S. Reyes	4	(0)
2006–2008	Getafe B		
2008–2009	Rayo B		
2009–2013	Rayo Vallecano	45	(1)
2012–2013	→ Xerez (loan)	38	(0)
2013–2014	Lugo	24	(0)
2014	Dinamo Tbilisi	0	(0)
2014–2015	Alavés	19	(1)
2015–2017	Reus	30	(0)
2017	Racing Ferrol	9	(0)
2017–2018	Badajoz	16	(0)
2018–2022	Manchego Ciudad Real	89	(1)
2022–2024	Villarrubia	59	(2)
- * Club domestic league appearances and goals

Rafael 'Rafa' García García (born 14 January 1986) is a Spanish former professional footballer who played as a midfielder.

== Football career ==
Born in Ciudad Real, Castile-La Mancha, García began his career in the youth ranks of Albacete Balompié. After unsuccessful stints with Real Madrid (also youth) and its neighbours Getafe CF he signed with another side from the capital in 2009, Rayo Vallecano.

García made his debut for the first team on 2 September 2009, in a 2–0 away win over Real Sociedad for the second round of the Copa del Rey. His first appearance in Segunda División came in the same month, in a 1–1 away draw against Girona FC; he played 24 matches in his first season (one goal, in the 3–3 home draw to Real Sociedad), adding 17 in the following – nine starts, 782 minutes of action – to help his team return to La Liga after an eight-year absence.

García played his first game in the top division on 1 October 2011, featuring the second half of a 1–1 away draw against Racing de Santander. On 31 January of the following year, after only having collected a further 106 minutes in the league, he was loaned to Xerez CD in the second level, until June.

García was forced to halt his career in early October 2012, after it was revealed he suffered from a heart condition. On the 29th, after the pertinent exams, the club announced he had been cleared to resume his activity.

In the following years, García alternated between the second tier and Segunda División B, representing in quick succession CD Lugo, Deportivo Alavés, CF Reus Deportiu, Racing de Ferrol and CD Badajoz. In 2014, he had a very brief spell in the Georgian Erovnuli Liga with FC Dinamo Tbilisi.

On 28 September 2018, García joined amateurs CD Manchego Ciudad Real.
