= Tomasz Radziwon =

Polish association football player

Personal information
- Date of birth: 29 August 1980 (age 46)
- Place of birth: Olsztyn, Poland
- Height: 1.80 m (5 ft 11 in)
- Position: Midfielder

Youth career
- Sokół Ostróda
1996–2002	Stomil Olsztyn	45	(0)
2002–2003	Pogoń Szczecin	13	(0)
2003	Sokół Ostróda		
2004	Drwęca Nowe Miasto Lubawskie		
2004–2005	Szczakowianka Jaworzno	24	(0)
2005–2006	DKS Dobre Miasto		
2009	Kormoran Zwierzewo		

International career
Years	Team	Apps	(Gls)
- Poland U16
- Poland U18

Tomasz Radziwon (born 29 August 1980) is a Polish former professional footballer who played as a midfielder.

== Career ==
By the age of 15, Radziwon made his debut in the Polish fourth division with Sokół Ostróda.

In 96, Radziwon left Sokół for top division Stomil Olsztyn's youth team, partially on the advice of the Polish Football Association, who wanted him to develop at a higher level.

After the 1997 UEFA European Under-16 Championship, Radziwon was offered a youth contract with Borussia Dortmund in the German Bundesliga. However, he refused the offer, thinking it was not the right time to leave Poland. In 2001, he said that he regretted not accepting the contract.

In 2003, after failing to establish himself in the first team of Stomil Olsztyn and Pogoń Szczecin, Radziwon returned to Sokół Ostróda in the Polish third division, where his father coached.

Despite not playing for a few seasons, Radziwon was persuaded to join Kormoran Zwierzewo because his father wanted promotion to the district league.

He now runs R-GOL, a football store, with his brother Marcin.
