= Bicho (footballer, born 1992) =

Spanish footballer

Personal information
- Full name: David Díaz Mangano
- Date of birth: 2 December 1992 (age 33)
- Place of birth: Puerto Real, Spain
- Height: 1.82 m (5 ft 11 1/2 in)
- Position: Midfielder

Youth career
- 2002–2010: CD La Salle
- 2010–2011: Puerto Real

Senior career*
Years	Team	Apps	(Gls)
2011–2012	Puerto Real	5	(0)
2012–2013	Xerez B	5	(2)
2012–2013	Xerez	2	(0)
2013–2015	Pobla de Mafumet	64	(1)
2015	Arcos	7	(0)
2015–2016	Morell	23	(1)
2016	Vilanova	1	(0)
2016	La Salle	2	(0)
2016–2017	Conil	32	(0)
- * Club domestic league appearances and goals as of 15 October 2017

David Díaz Mangano (born 2 December 1992), commonly known as Bicho, is a Spanish footballer who plays as a midfielder.

== Club career ==
Born in Puerto Real, Province of Cádiz, Bicho made his debuts as a senior with Puerto Real CF in 2011–12 season, representing the side in Primera Andaluza. In 2012 summer he joined Xerez CD, being initially assigned to the reserves.

Bicho made his official debut for the Andalusians' first team on 4 November 2012, playing the last 28 minutes in a 5–1 away win over Hércules CF in the Segunda División championship. He appeared in one further match during the campaign, with his side suffering relegation.

On 15 August 2013 Bicho signed with CF Pobla de Mafumet, in Tercera División. On 19 July 2015, after appearing as his side achieved its first promotion ever to Segunda División B, he was released.
