= José Vega (Spanish footballer) =

Spanish footballer

Personal information
- Full name: José Vega Díez
- Date of birth: 10 April 1981 (age 45)
- Place of birth: Jerez de la Frontera, Spain
- Height: 1.76 m (5 ft 9 in)
- Position: Winger

Youth career
- Xerez

Senior career*
Years	Team	Apps	(Gls)
1999–2000	Xerez	14	(1)
2000–2001	CD San Fernando	20	(1)
2001–2002	Real Madrid C		
2002–2004	Cultural Leonesa	72	(11)
2004–2005	Alicante	29	(2)
2005–2006	Terrassa	32	(5)
2006–2007	Écija	35	(9)
2007–2008	Elche	30	(3)
2008–2010	Córdoba	57	(4)
2010–2013	Xerez	50	(5)
2014	San Fernando CD	14	(0)
2014–2016	Guadalcacín	58	(6)
2016–2018	Xerez	66	(7)
Total		477	(54)
- * Club domestic league appearances and goals

José Vega Díez (born 10 April 1981) is a Spanish former professional footballer from Jerez de la Frontera, Province of Cádiz, Andalusia, who played as a left winger.
