= Jesús Mendoza (footballer, born 1977) =

Spanish footballer and manager

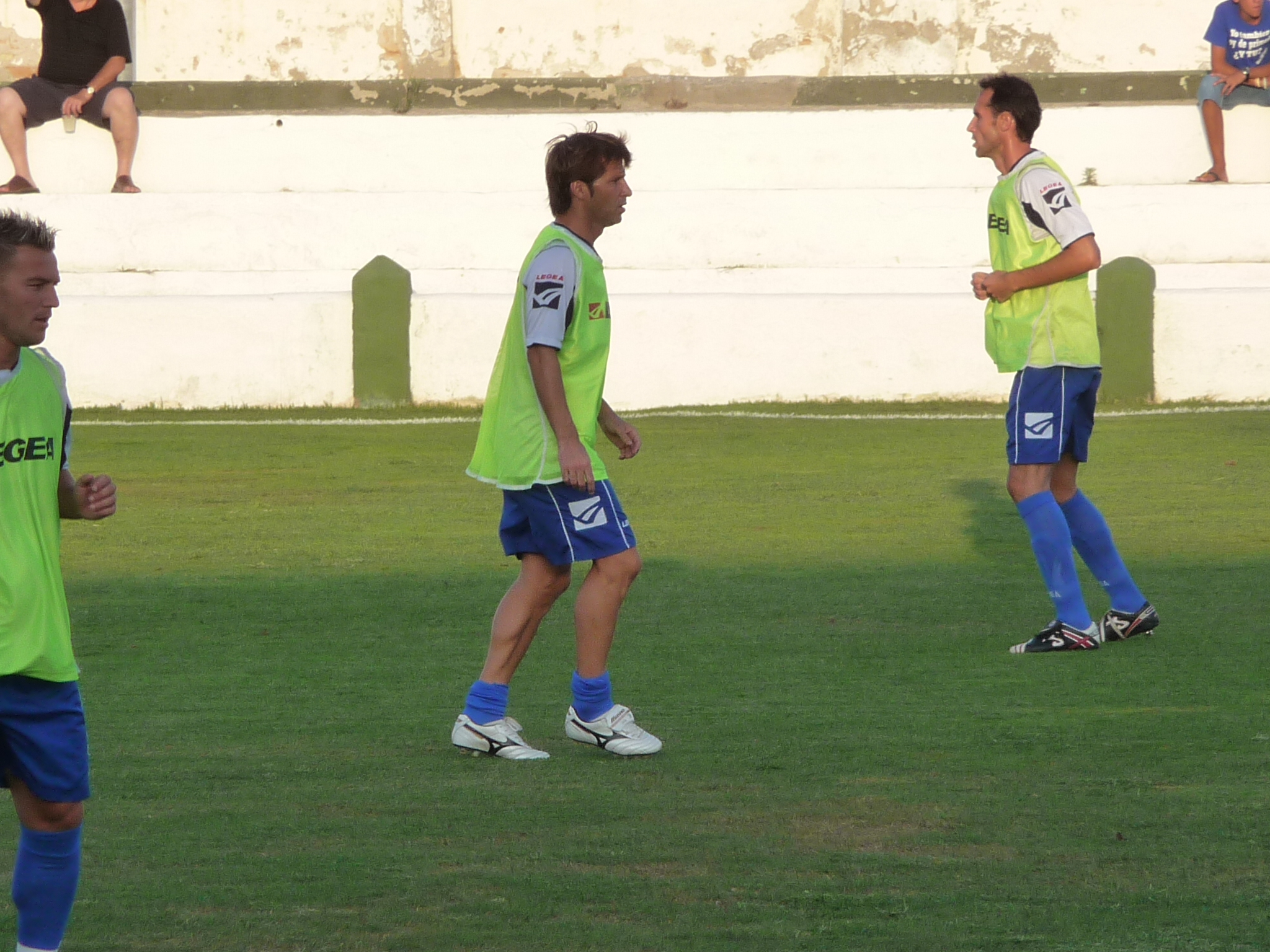
- Mendoza (center) with Xerez in 2009

Personal information
- Full name: Jesús Mendoza Aguirre
- Date of birth: 23 February 1977 (age 49)
- Place of birth: Jerez de la Frontera, Spain
- Height: 1.75 m (5 ft 9 in)
- Position: Left-back

Youth career
- Jerez Industrial
- Flamenco
- Cádiz

Senior career*
Years	Team	Apps	(Gls)
1996–1999	Cádiz B	44	(6)
1998–1999	→ Portuense (loan)	31	(9)
1999–2013	Xerez	432	(12)
2013–2014	Sanluqueño	15	(2)
Total		522	(29)

Managerial career
- 2014–2015: Xerez
- 2015–2016: Trebujena
- 2016–2017: Jerez Industrial
- 2017–2018: Villamartín
- 2018–2019: Guadalcacín
- 2019–2021: Roteña
- * Club domestic league appearances and goals

Jesús Mendoza Aguirre (born 23 February 1977) is a Spanish former professional footballer who played as a left-back, currently a manager.

He spent the vast majority of his 18-year senior career with Xerez, competing in all three major levels of Spanish football and appearing in 459 competitive matches. He started working as a manager in 2014, with the same club.

== Playing career ==
Mendoza was born in Jerez de la Frontera, Province of Cádiz. After starting out at lowly Racing Club Portuense, he signed with his hometown side Xerez CD in 1999. In seven of the following ten seasons he never appeared in less than 32 games, being instrumental in the Andalusians' promotions to Segunda División (2001) and La Liga (2009).

In the 2009–10 campaign, Mendoza could only play 12 league matches due to injury and suspension as the team were immediately relegated from the top flight. He made his debut in the competition on 30 August 2009, in a 2–0 away loss against RCD Mallorca.

In late 2010, the 33-year-old Mendoza renewed his contract with his main club for a further season, whilst accepting to take a pay cut. On 3 July 2013, having dropped two tiers at once, he left the Estadio Municipal de Chapín and joined Atlético Sanluqueño CF of Segunda División B, retiring in January of the following year.

== Coaching career ==
Mendoza returned to his former club Xerez on 7 July 2014, being appointed manager of the first team. This was after a spell with their youths when he was still an active player.

Subsequently, Mendoza worked with several amateur sides in his region of birth.

== Honours ==
Xerez

- Segunda División: 2008–09
