= Víctor Espasandín =

Spanish footballer (born 1985)

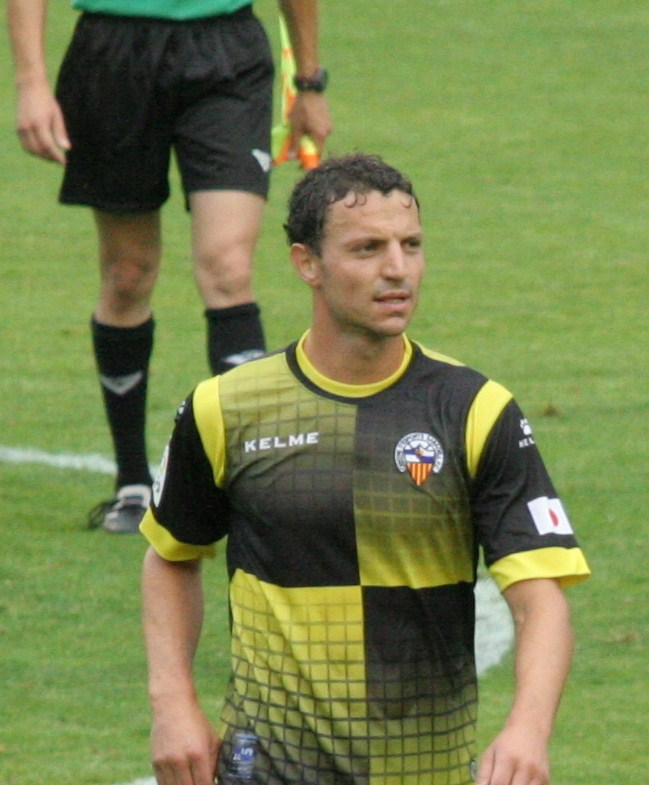

Personal information
- Full name: Víctor Manuel Espasandín Facal
- Date of birth: 16 March 1985 (age 41)
- Place of birth: A Coruña, Spain
- Height: 1.76 m (5 ft 9 1/2 in)
- Position: Left back

Youth career
- 2001–2004: Compostela
- 2004–2005: Valladolid

Senior career*
Years	Team	Apps	(Gls)
2004	Compostela	2	(0)
2005–2006	Valladolid B	36	(0)
2006	Valladolid	1	(0)
2006–2007	Ponferradina	7	(0)
2007–2010	Barcelona B	75	(0)
2010–2011	Omonia	9	(0)
2012	Montañeros	13	(1)
2012–2015	Sabadell	41	(1)
2015–2016	Pobla Mafumet	18	(0)
2018–	Metro		
- * Club domestic league appearances and goals as of 15 May 2016

Víctor Manuel Espasandín Facal (born 16 March 1985) is a Spanish footballer who plays as a left back for New Zealand club Metro.

== Club career ==
Born in A Coruña, Galicia, Espasandín finished his football formation at Real Valladolid, having joined from local SD Compostela. In the 2005–06 season he made his professional debut, playing one second division match; his fate did not improve in the following campaign as he only appeared in seven games (out of 42) for SD Ponferradina, which eventually got relegated.

Espasandín signed for FC Barcelona B in July 2007, helping the Catalans return to the third level in his debut season under young manager Pep Guardiola. In early June 2010, after helping Barça B return to division two after 11 years, he signed a contract with AC Omonia from Cyprus, joining the club alongside former Barcelona teammate José Manuel Rueda.

== Honours ==
Omonia

- Cypriot Cup: 2010–11
- Cypriot Super Cup: 2010
