= Juan Zamora =

Spanish footballer

Personal information
- Full name: Juan Antonio Zamora Zambudio
- Date of birth: 3 May 1983 (age 43)
- Place of birth: Murcia, Spain
- Height: 1.86 m (6 ft 1 in)
- Position: Defender

Senior career*
Years	Team	Apps	(Gls)
2001–2002	Real Madrid C		
2002–2003	Cartagonova	15	(0)
2004	Murcia B		
2004	Murcia	2	(0)
2004–2005	Girona	23	(4)
2005–2010	Castellón	87	(3)
2010–2011	Ceuta	32	(0)
2012	Badajoz	10	(0)
2012–2016	Recreativo	65	(0)
Total		234+	(7+)
- * Club domestic league appearances and goals

Juan Antonio Zamora Zambudio (born 3 May 1983 in Murcia) is a Spanish former professional footballer who played as a right-back or a central defender.
