= Nacho Garro =

Spanish footballer (born 1981)

Personal information
- Full name: Ignacio Garro Gómez de Carrero
- Date of birth: 21 April 1981 (age 45)
- Place of birth: Vitoria, Spain
- Height: 1.85 m (6 ft 1 in)
- Position: Central midfielder

Youth career
- Athletic Bilbao

Senior career*
Years	Team	Apps	(Gls)
1999–2001	Bilbao Athletic	54	(2)
2001–2002	Amurrio	27	(3)
2002	Bilbao Athletic	4	(0)
2003	Amurrio	15	(1)
2003–2005	Burgos	44	(2)
2005–2007	Murcia	22	(2)
2006–2007	→ Las Palmas (loan)	33	(1)
2007–2009	Alavés	35	(1)
2009–2011	Eibar	41	(0)
2011–2012	Mirandés	24	(0)
Total		299	(12)

International career
1997	Spain U16	7	(1)
Medal record
Men's football
Representing Spain
UEFA European Under-16 Championship
Winner	1997 Germany
- * Club domestic league appearances and goals

Ignacio Garro Gómez de Carrero (born 21 April 1981), known as Nacho Garro, is a Spanish former professional footballer who played as a central midfielder.

== Honours ==
Spain U16

- UEFA European Under-16 Championship: 1997
