= Lucas Porcar =

Spanish footballer

Personal information
- Full name: Lucas Porcar Teixidó
- Date of birth: 18 February 1990 (age 36)
- Place of birth: Sant Cugat, Spain
- Height: 1.91 m (6 ft 3 in)
- Position: Attacking midfielder

Youth career
- 2000–2009: Espanyol

Senior career*
Years	Team	Apps	(Gls)
2009–2011	Espanyol B	54	(17)
2011–2012	Villarreal B	32	(7)
2012–2015	Zaragoza	3	(0)
2012–2013	→ Xerez (loan)	30	(4)
2014	→ Eupen (loan)	9	(1)
2014–2015	→ Sabadell (loan)	7	(0)
2015–2016	Espanyol B	4	(0)
2016–2017	Hospitalet	36	(1)
Total		175	(30)

International career
2005	Spain U16	1	(0)
2007	Spain U17	10	(0)
Medal record
Men's football
Representing Spain
U-17 World Cup
Runner-up	2007 Korea
European U-17 Championship
Winner	2007 Belgium
- * Club domestic league appearances and goals

Lucas Porcar Teixidó (born 18 February 1990) is a Spanish former professional footballer who played as an attacking midfielder.

== Club career ==
Born in Sant Cugat del Vallès, Barcelona, Catalonia, Porcar was a product of local RCD Espanyol's youth system. He made his senior debut in the 2009–10 season with their reserves in the Segunda División B, managing 22 appearances with three goals but suffering relegation.

After an impressive second year, Porcar signed for Villarreal CF B of Segunda División. He made his official debut on 27 August 2011 against FC Barcelona B, and scored in a 2–0 away win.

Porcar joined Real Zaragoza in August 2012, being loaned to second-division club Xerez CD late in the month. The latter was eventually relegated and, on 31 January 2014, he moved to Belgian Second Division's K.A.S. Eupen until the end of the campaign.

On 31 August 2014, Porcar signed with CE Sabadell FC in a season-long loan deal. On 13 August of the following year, he returned to Espanyol B after being released.

In April 2016, Porcar was released after playing only 154 minutes for the B side. Four months later, he joined CE L'Hospitalet also in the third tier.

== Honours ==
Spain U17

- UEFA European Under-17 Championship: 2007
- FIFA U-17 World Cup runner-up: 2007
