= David Córcoles =

Spanish footballer

Personal information
- Full name: David Córcoles Alcaraz
- Date of birth: 8 May 1985 (age 41)
- Place of birth: Alicante, Spain
- Height: 1.87 m (6 ft 2 in)
- Position: Right back

Youth career
- CD San Blas Alto
- 2000–2002: Hércules

Senior career*
Years	Team	Apps	(Gls)
2002–2003	Hércules	6	(0)
2003–2007	Valencia B	79	(0)
2007	Valencia	1	(0)
2007–2009	Barcelona B	65	(0)
2009–2015	Recreativo	151	(0)
2015–2016	Albacete	16	(0)
2016–2018	Racing Santander	42	(0)
2018–2019	Alcoyano	12	(0)
2019–2021	Vilamarxant	30	(1)

International career
2002	Spain U17	3	(0)

Managerial career
- 2023–2024: Meliana
- * Club domestic league appearances and goals

David Córcoles Alcaraz (born 8 May 1985) is a Spanish former professional footballer who played as a right back, and a current manager.

== Club career ==
Born in Alicante, Valencian Community, Córcoles started his professional career with hometown club Hércules CF, finishing his football grooming at local giants Valencia CF. On 5 December 2006, he played his first game with the first team of the latter, coming on as a substitute for Miguel Pallardó in the last minute of the 0–1 group stage loss against A.S. Roma for the UEFA Champions League; in La Liga's last round, also in that season, he featured the full 90 minutes of a 3–3 home draw to Real Sociedad.

Córcoles moved to FC Barcelona B in the summer of 2007, never receiving an opportunity with the main squad. In July 2009, he signed a two-year contract with Recreativo de Huelva, recently relegated to the second division.
