= Arahal =

- Municipality
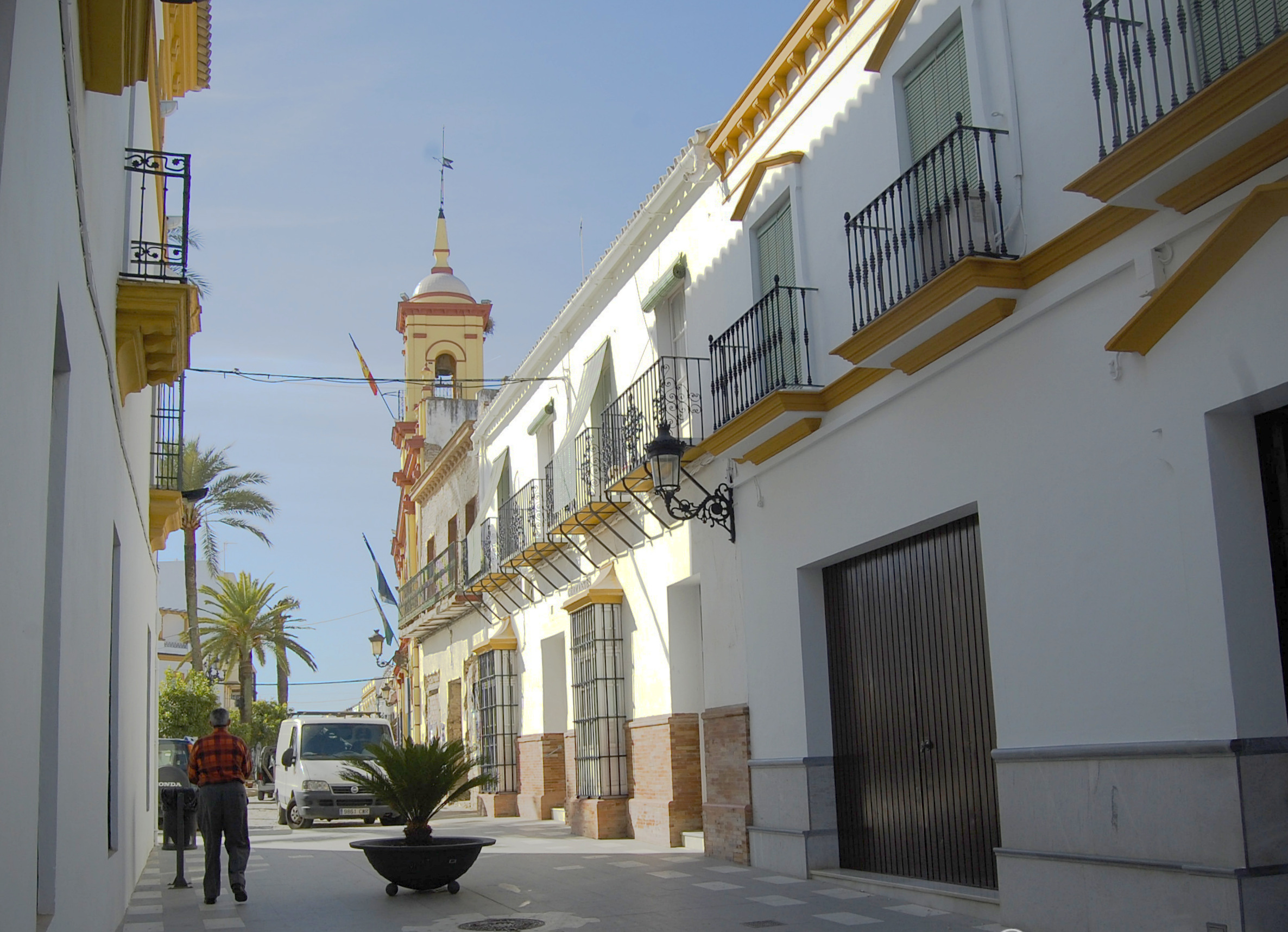

- Flag Coat of arms

- Location in the Province of Seville Location in Andalusia Location in Spain
- Coordinates: 37°15′N 5°32′W
- Country: Spain
- Autonomous community: Andalusia
- Province: Seville
- Comarca: La Campiña

Government
  - Mayor: Francisco Brenes

Area
  - Total: 201.09 km^{2} (77.64 sq mi)
- Elevation: 117 m (384 ft)

Population (2025-01-01)
  - Total: 19,546
  - Density: 97.200/km^{2} (251.75/sq mi)
- Demonym: Arahalenses
- Time zone: UTC+1 (CET)
  - Summer (DST): UTC+2 (CEST)
- Postal code: 41600
- Website: Official website

Arahal is a municipality in Seville, Andalusia, Spain. It is situated on the southeast of Seville. This town is also known as "El Arahal", with this name recognized until 1981.

== Etymology ==
Ar-rahal is an Arabic term which means a place in the path where stopping to rest.

== History ==
Arahal's municipal archives were looted in 1857, obscuring its early history. Archaeological evidence suggests Arahal has ancient origins, with the name Basilippo found on tombstones. It is believed Arahal was a resting place for shepherds. After Fernando III's re-conquest of the region in 1240, Arahal belonged to the Order of Alcántara until 1460 and gained its own council in 1527.

Arahal was declared a Site of Cultural Interest in 1979.

In 2024, Arahal became known for its colourfully canopied shopping streets, hand-crocheted using over 2,000 balls of yarn by around 300 local residents to provide shade in the summer.

== Monuments ==
The municipality features several monuments in Arahal, most of them churches, including:

- Nta.Sra. de la Victoria church. Temple finished in 1551 and the tower late XVII
- Vera-Cruz church. 1602
- Casa Peralta. 1895

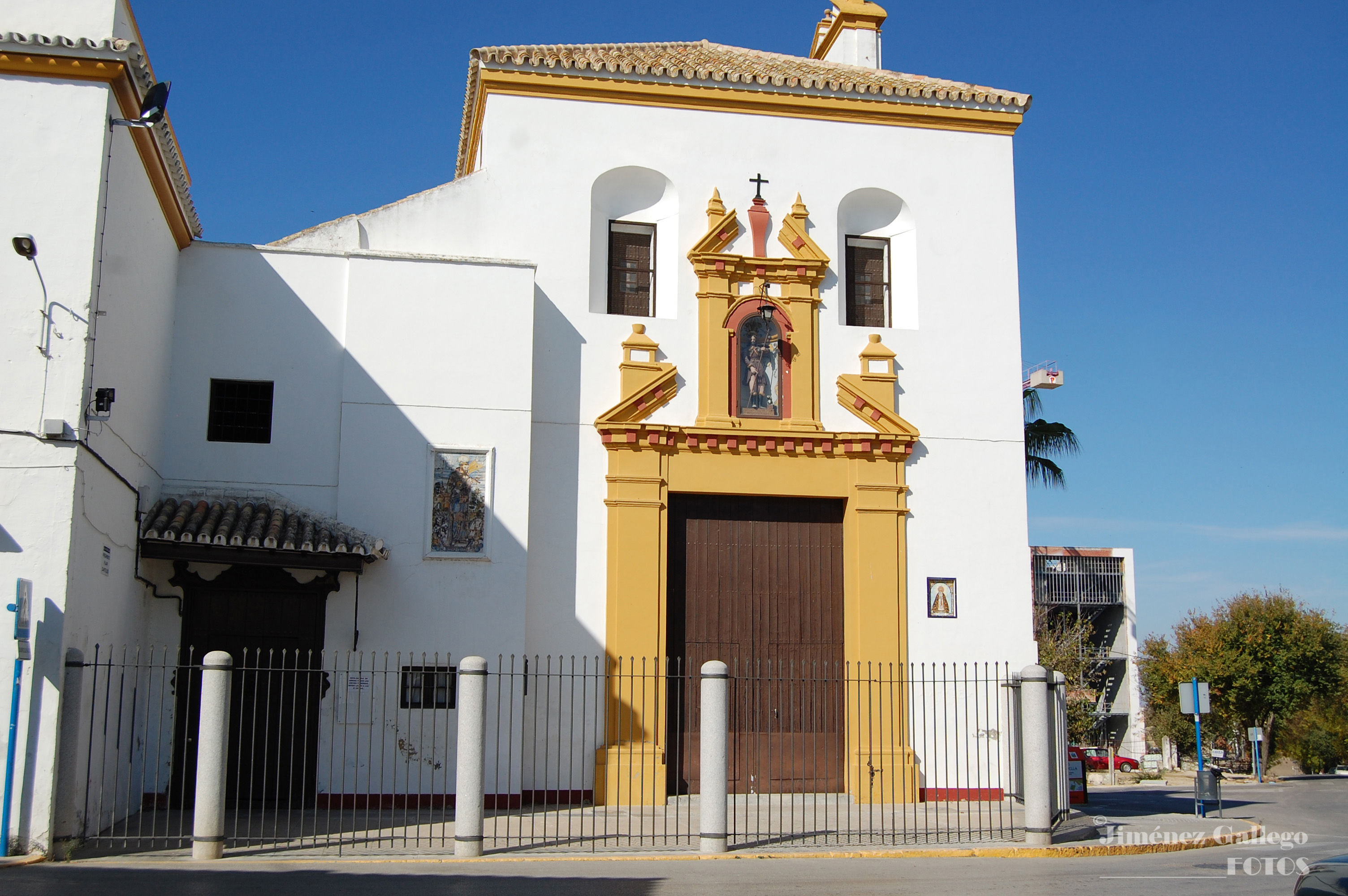
San Roque church

- Nta.Sra. del Rosario convent. 1608
- San Roque church (ex-convent). 1624
- Santo Cristo de la Misericordia church. 16th century
- Santa María Magdalena parish-church. It comes in a Neoclassical style and is one of the biggest in the province. It was rebuilt in 1800 after the 1755 Lisbon earthquake destroyed the old one, the tower remains from the previous temple. Mary Magdalene is the patron saint of the town.
- San Antonio hermitage built in the 17th century.

== Climate ==
Arahal has a Mediterranean climate Csa according to the Köppen climate classification, it is characterized by its variable rainfall, dry summers and extremely hot summers and mild winters and often rainy. One of the official historical higher temperatures was record in Arahal when the thermometer reached 49 °C on the shade on July 23, 1995, according to the Statistical Yearbook of Andalusia, the INM and AEMET. Arahal has a weather station located at Moron Air Base, whose station data represents the climate of Arahal, in operation since 1951.

Climate data for Arahal (Air base)
Month	Jan	Feb	Mar	Apr	May	Jun	Jul	Aug	Sep	Oct	Nov	Dec	Year
Record high °C (°F)	27.6 (81.7)	28.6 (83.5)	30.6 (87.1)	34.7 (94.5)	39.7 (103.5)	44.8 (112.6)	46.6 (115.9)	46.0 (114.8)	43.2 (109.8)	35.6 (96.1)	30.0 (86.0)	28.0 (82.4)	46.6 (115.9)
Mean daily maximum °C (°F)	15.7 (60.3)	17.4 (63.3)	20.8 (69.4)	22.2 (72.0)	26.0 (78.8)	31.2 (88.2)	35.2 (95.4)	34.7 (94.5)	31.0 (87.8)	25.4 (77.7)	19.7 (67.5)	16.4 (61.5)	24.7 (76.5)
Daily mean °C (°F)	9.9 (49.8)	11.3 (52.3)	13.9 (57.0)	15.5 (59.9)	18.9 (66.0)	23.3 (73.9)	26.7 (80.1)	26.9 (80.4)	23.9 (75.0)	19.2 (66.6)	14.1 (57.4)	11.3 (52.3)	17.9 (64.2)
Mean daily minimum °C (°F)	4.1 (39.4)	5.2 (41.4)	7.0 (44.6)	8.8 (47.8)	11.7 (53.1)	15.5 (59.9)	18.2 (64.8)	19.0 (66.2)	16.7 (62.1)	13.0 (55.4)	8.5 (47.3)	6.1 (43.0)	11.2 (52.2)
Record low °C (°F)	−8.0 (17.6)	−7.8 (18.0)	−4.2 (24.4)	−0.4 (31.3)	1.6 (34.9)	6.0 (42.8)	3.0 (37.4)	9.0 (48.2)	5.4 (41.7)	1.2 (34.2)	−2.4 (27.7)	−7.0 (19.4)	−8.0 (17.6)
Average precipitation mm (inches)	68 (2.7)	53 (2.1)	42 (1.7)	60 (2.4)	39 (1.5)	9 (0.4)	2 (0.1)	4 (0.2)	27 (1.1)	67 (2.6)	86 (3.4)	94 (3.7)	543 (21.4)
Average precipitation days	6	6	5	7	4	1	0	0	2	6	7	8	53
Average relative humidity (%)	74	71	64	61	57	50	44	47	54	64	72	77	61
Mean monthly sunshine hours	182	186	221	236	287	331	360	337	243	220	182	163	2,948

== Transport ==
Arahal has a train station, with connections to Seville, Dos Hermanas, Marchena, and Málaga by Renfe railways. There are also bus connections to Málaga Airport.

== See also ==
- List of municipalities in Seville
