= Cifu (footballer, born 1980) =

Spanish footballer

Personal information
- Full name: Daniel Cifuentes Alfaro
- Date of birth: 13 July 1980 (age 46)
- Place of birth: Madrid, Spain
- Height: 1.71 m (5 ft 7 in)
- Position: Right back

Youth career
- Real Madrid

Senior career*
Years	Team	Apps	(Gls)
2000–2001	Real Madrid C		
2001–2003	Zamora	48	(5)
2003–2004	Lanzarote	34	(1)
2004–2005	Eibar	39	(1)
2005–2007	Real Sociedad	14	(0)
2007	→ Ponferradina (loan)	16	(1)
2007–2008	Valladolid	9	(0)
2009–2011	Cádiz	78	(2)
2011–2014	Recreativo	76	(1)
2015–2016	Lincoln Red Imps	2	(0)
2016	Zamora	5	(0)
2017	Mancha Real	12	(1)
2018–2020	Isla Cristina	52	(9)
2020–2021	Castilleja	20	(0)
2021–2022	UD Tomares	27	(0)
2022–2024	Atlético Central		

International career
1998	Spain U17	1	(0)

Managerial career
- 2017–2018: Equatorial Guinea (loc. assistant)
- * Club domestic league appearances and goals as of 27 March 2022

Daniel Cifuentes Alfaro (born 13 July 1980), known as Cifu, is a Spanish footballer who plays as a right back.

== Club career ==
Cifu was born in Madrid. An unsuccessful graduate of Real Madrid's youth system, he went on to make his professional debut with Zamora CF, spending most of his early career in the Segunda División B.

In the 2005–06 season, Cifu joined Real Sociedad for €450.000, making his La Liga debut on 21 September 2005 and playing the full 90 minutes in the 3–2 home win over Atlético Madrid. Never an important element for the Basques he would be loaned, in January 2007, to Segunda División club SD Ponferradina, and he scored once for his new team, in a 3–3 away draw against UD Salamanca – who led 3–0 at the hour mark – on 1 April; Ponferradina would be, however, relegated.

Cifu signed for Real Valladolid in August 2007. After having featured in only nine matches throughout the campaign, he was released by mutual consent in October of the following year.

In late January 2009, Cifu moved to Cádiz CF, being part of the squad that returned to the second tier after a one-year absence. In the following season he was an undisputed starter (34 games, 33 starts), but the Andalusians would be immediately relegated.

On 21 July 2011, Cifu joined Recreativo de Huelva on a two-year deal. He went on to spend three seasons in the second division with the club, scoring his only goal on 19 October 2013 to help the hosts recover from a three-goal disadvantage against CD Lugo to draw 3–3.

Cifu retired in 2020 at the age of 40, following short spells with Lincoln Red Imps (Gibraltar Premier Division), Zamora, Atlético Mancha Real and Isla Cristina FC. However, he joined Castilleja CF on 25 September 2020.

== International career ==
On 31 December 2017, Cifu announced he would part of the technical staff of the Equatorial Guinea national team for local-based players soon to compete at the 2018 African Nations Championship.
