= 2010–11 Real Valladolid season =

Real Valladolid
2010–11 season
- President: Carlos Suárez Sureda
- Head coach: Antonio Gómez (until November 29); Javier Torres Gómez (November 29–December 5); Abel Resino (from December 5)
- Stadium: José Zorrilla
- Segunda División: 7th (Qualified to Promotion Play-off)
- Promotion Play-off: Semi-finals
- Copa del Rey: Round of 32
- Top goalscorer: League: Javi Guerra (28); All: Javi Guerra (29)
Home colours	Away colours	Third colours

The 2010–11 season was Real Valladolid's first season in the second level in Spanish football since the historical 2006–07 season, in which the team was promoted to La Liga with 88 points.

After the salvation attempt of the previous season, Javier Clemente was sacked on 23 June 2010, before the pre-season. Antonio Gómez, Rafael Benítez's former assistant and the former coach of Albacete B, was the new team coach for the 2010–11 season but he was sacked on 29 November 2010 after the defeat against Cartagena in Nuevo José Zorrilla. Javier Torres Gómez was the provisional manager between 29 November and 5 December, earning a point at Barcelona Atlètic's Mini Estadi. After that, Abel Resino was named new team coach in the afternoon of 5 December.

== Trophies balance ==
Category	Trophy	Started round	First match	Result	Last match
Friendly Trophy	Copa Castilla y León 2009–10	Semi-finals	8 September 2009	Runners-up	16 November 2010
Friendly Trophy	Copa Castilla y León 2010–11	Group Stage	25 July 2010	Group Stage	30 July 2010
Friendly Trophy	13th Ramón Losada Trophy	Final	21 August 2010	Winners	21 August 2010
Competitive	Liga Adelante	—	27 August 2010	7th (Qualified for the Promotion play-off)	4 June 2011
Competitive	Promotion play-off	Semifinals	9 June 2011	Semifinals	12 June 2011
Competitive	Copa del Rey	Second Qualifying Round	1 September 2010	Round of 32	9 November 2010

=== Competitive balance ===
Biggest win
	Home				Away			
Liga Adelante	12 September 2010	Matchday 3	v. Recreativo Huelva	4 – 0	27 March 2011	Matchday 31	v. Salamanca	0 – 5
Liga Adelante	11 May 2011	Matchday 38	v. Córdoba	5 – 1	27 March 2011	Matchday 31	v. Salamanca	0 – 5
Promotion Play-off	9 June 2011	Semifinals, 1st leg	v. Elche	1 – 0	None due to the elimination in semifinals			
Copa del Rey	1 September 2010	QR 2	v. Las Palmas	5 – 3	None due to the elimination in round of 32			
Biggest loss
	Home				Away			
Liga Adelante	28 November 2010	Matchday 14	v. Cartagena	0 – 1	21 November 2010	Matchday 13	v. Xerez	4 – 0
Liga Adelante	11 December 2010	Matchday 16	v. Numancia	4 – 5	21 November 2010	Matchday 13	v. Xerez	4 – 0
Liga Adelante	5 February 2011	Matchday 23	v. Granada	2 – 3	21 November 2010	Matchday 13	v. Xerez	4 – 0
Promotion Play-off	None due to the elimination in semifinals				12 June 2011	Semifinals, 2nd leg	v. Elche	3 – 1
Copa del Rey	27 October 2010	Round of 32	v. Espanyol	0 – 2	None due to the elimination in round of 32			

== Summer transfers ==
=== In ===
(substituted on) In (8 players)
Player	From	Fee
(Spain) Carlos Peña	(Spain) Recreativo de Huelva	Free
(Spain) Marc Valiente	(Spain) Sevilla Atlético	Free
(Spain) Carlos Lázaro	(Spain) Real Valladolid B	Free
(Spain) Javi Guerra	(Spain) Mallorca; He was playing on loan at (Spain) Levante UD	€0.3m
(Spain) Jorge Alonso	(Spain) Hércules	Free
(Spain) Antonio Calle	(Spain) Girona	Free
(Spain) Jofre	(Spain) Rayo Vallecano	Free
(Spain) Óscar González	(Greece) Olympiacos	Free

=== Out ===
(substituted off) Out (8 players)
Player	New Team	Fee
(Spain) Borja	(Spain) Getafe	Free
(Bosnia and Herzegovina) Haris Medunjanin	(Israel) Maccabi Tel Aviv	€2M
(Spain) Alberto Marcos	(Spain) Huesca	Free
(Spain) Luis Prieto	(Spain) Ponferradina	Free
(Brazil) Nivaldo	(Israel) Maccabi Tel Aviv	Free
(Portugal) Henrique Sereno	(Portugal) Porto	Free
(Spain) Jonathan Sesma	(Spain) Córdoba	Free
(Uruguay) Fabián Canobbio	(Greece) AEL	Free

=== Loan in ===
(substituted on) Loan in (3 players)
Player	From
(Brazil) Guilherme	(Spain) Almería
(Spain) Jordi Figueras	(Russia) Rubin Kazan
(Guinea) Alhassane Keita	(Spain) Mallorca

=== Loan out ===
(substituted off) Loan out (5 players)
Player	Team
(Angola) Manucho	(Turkey) Bucaspor
(Spain) Fabricio	(Spain) Recreativo Huelva
(Spain) Marquitos	(Spain) Villarreal B
(Spain) Héctor Font	(Spain) Xerez
(Spain) Alberto Bueno	(England) Derby County

=== Loan return ===
(substituted on) Loan return (2 players)
Italics for players returning to the club but left it during pre-season
Player	From
(Spain) Jesús Rueda	(Spain) Córdoba
(Spain) Álvaro Antón	(Spain) Recreativo Huelva

=== Loan end ===
(substituted off) Loan end (4 players)
Player	Returns to
(Spain) Keko	(Spain) Atlético Madrid
(Portugal) Pelé	(Portugal) Porto
(Spain) Asier del Horno	(Spain) Valencia
(Brazil) Diego Costa	(Spain) Atlético Madrid

=== Testing players ===
Testing players (1 player)
Liga Adelante teams can bring non-UE players to prove them without transfer and to decide later if they register them or not
Player	Current team	Test matches	Test result
(Serbia) Željko Đokić	(Greece) Panthrakikos	v. (Spain) Osasuna (August 18, 2010) v. (Spain) Real Oviedo (August 21, 2010)	Failed

== Winter transfers ==
=== In ===
(substituted on) In (3 players)
Player	From	Fee
(Spain) Sergio Matabuena	(Spain) Sporting Gijón	Free
(Spain) Juanito	(Spain) Atlético Madrid	Free
(Tunisia) Mehdi Nafti	(Greece) Aris	Free

=== Out ===
(substituted off) Out (2 players)
Player	New Team	Fee
(Spain) César Arzo	(Belgium) Gent	Free
(Spain) Antonio Calle	(Spain) Albacete	Free

=== Loan in ===
(substituted on) Loan in (1 player)
Player	From
(Portugal) Fábio Faria	(Portugal) Benfica
(Uruguay) William Ferreira; Denied by FIFA	(Bolivia) Bolívar

=== Loan out ===
(substituted off) Loan out (1 player)
Player	Team
(Angola) Manucho	(Turkey) Manisaspor

=== Loan return ===
(substituted on) Loan return (0 players)
Italics for players returning to the club but left it again to another team
Player	From
(Angola) Manucho	(Turkey) Bucaspor

=== Loan end ===
(substituted off) Loan end (1 player)
Player	Returns to
(Guinea) Alhassane Keita	(Spain) Mallorca; Then, sold to (Saudi Arabia) Al-Shabab Riyadh

== Players ==
=== Squad ===
Note: Flags indicate national team as defined under FIFA eligibility rules; some limited exceptions apply. Players may hold more than one non-FIFA nationality.

No.	Pos.	Nation	Player
1	GK	PAR	Justo Villar
2	DF	POR	Fábio Faria (On loan from Benfica)
3	DF	ESP	Jordi Figueras (On loan from Rubin Kazan)
4	DF	ESP	Marc Valiente
5	DF	ESP	Juanito
6	MF	ESP	Jesús Rueda
7	MF	ESP	Nauzet
8	DF	ESP	Javier Baraja
9	FW	ESP	Javi Guerra
10	MF	ESP	Álvaro Antón
11	MF	ESP	Jofre
12	MF	ESP	Sergio Matabuena
14	MF	ESP	Jorge Alonso

No.	Pos.	Nation	Player
15	DF	BRA	Guilherme (On loan from Almería)
16	DF	ESP	Pedro López
17	DF	ESP	Carlos Peña
18	MF	ESP	Álvaro Rubio
19	DF	ESP	Antonio Barragán
20	MF	ESP	Carlos Lázaro
21	MF	ESP	Sisi
22	MF	TUN	Mehdi Nafti
24	MF	ESP	Óscar González
25	GK	ESP	Jacobo Sanz
27	FW	ESP	Quique
28	FW	ESP	Bacari
30	GK	ESP	Javi Jiménez

=== Youth system ===
Note: Flags indicate national team as defined under FIFA eligibility rules; some limited exceptions apply. Players may hold more than one non-FIFA nationality.

No.	Pos.	Nation	Player
26	DF	ESP	Raúl Navas
29	FW	ESP	Rubén Sánchez
31	MF	ESP	Javi Navas
32	DF	ESP	Felipe Alfonso

No.	Pos.	Nation	Player
—	MF	ESP	Sergio Durán
—	MF	ESP	Toni
—	DF	ESP	Víctor Mongil
—	GK	ESP	José Antonio Salcedo

=== Nominated by their national football team ===
List of players nominated by their national team
1	Justo Villar	Paraguay	v. Costa Rica (11 August 2010) v. Japan (4 September 2010) v. China (7 September 2010) v. Australia (9 October 2010) v. New Zealand (12 October 2010) v. Hong Kong (17 November 2010) v. Mexico (26 March 2011) v. United States (29 March 2011) v. Bolivia (4 June 2011) v. Bolivia (7 June 2011) v. Romania (11 June 2011) v. Chile (23 June 2011)
2	Fábio Faria	Portugal U23	v. Italy (24 March 2011)

== Match stats ==
No.	Pos.	Player	Goal			Booked			(yellow card) (yellow-red card)			Sent off (straight red)		
No.	Pos.	Player	League	Promotion P.O.	Cup	League	Promotion P.O.	Cup	League	Promotion P.O.	Cup	League	Promotion P.O.	Cup
1	GK	(Paraguay) Justo Villar				2								
2	DF	(Portugal) Fábio Faria				2								
3	DF	(Spain) Jordi Figueras	2			4	1	1						
4	DF	(Spain) Marc Valiente	2			4	1						1	
5	DF	(Spain) César Arzo (Out)	1			10								
5	DF	(Spain) Juanito				5						1		
6	MF	(Spain) Jesús Rueda				1								1
7	FW	(Spain) Nauzet	7		1	12	1		1				1	
8	DF	(Spain) Javier Baraja				7		1				1		
9	FW	(Spain) Javi Guerra	28	1		7	1							
10	MF	(Spain) Álvaro Antón	1		1	2		1						
11	MF	(Spain) Jofre	2		1	1								1
12	MF	(Spain) Sergio Matabuena				5			1					
14	MF	(Spain) Jorge Alonso	4		1	5								
15	DF	(Brazil) Guilherme				5			2					
16	DF	(Spain) Pedro López	1			6						1		
17	DF	(Spain) Carlos Peña				5		2						
18	MF	(Spain) Álvaro Rubio				5	1							
19	DF	(Spain) Antonio Barragán			1	11	1	1						
21	MF	(Spain) Sisi	2			9		1						
22	FW	(Spain) Antonio Calle (Out)	4		2	1		1						
22	MF	(Tunisia) Mehdi Nafti	1			7	2							
23	FW	(Guinea) Alhassane Keita (Out)						1						
24	MF	(Spain) Óscar González	7			4	1					1		
25	GK	(Spain) Jacobo Sanz				2								
26	DF	(Spain) Raúl Navas				1								
28	FW	(Spain) Bacari	1											
30	GK	(Spain) Javi Jiménez				3						1		
31	MF	(Spain) Javi Navas						1						

== Match results ==
=== Pre-season and friendly tournaments ===
==== Friendly matches ====
3 August 2010	Inverness (Scotland)	0 – 0	Real Valladolid	Inverness, Scotland
20:45 CEST; 19:45 Local time		(Report)	(yellow card) 85' Javi Navas	Stadium: Tulloch Caledonian; Attendance: 1,000; Referee: (Scotland) Frank McDermott

5 August 2010	Kilmarnock (Scotland)	0 – 0	Real Valladolid	Kilmarnock, Scotland
20:30 CEST; 19:30 Local time	Silva (yellow card) 23'		(yellow card) 23' Guilherme	Stadium: Rugby Park; Attendance: 3,109; Referee: (Scotland) Euan Norris

7 August 2010	Saint Johnstone (Scotland)	1 – 0	Real Valladolid	Perth, Scotland
16:00 CEST; 15:00 Local time	Haber 46'	(Report)		Stadium: McDiarmid Park; Attendance: 1,740; Referee: (Scotland) Alan Muir

10 August 2010	Celtic Glasgow (Scotland)	0 – 6	Real Valladolid	Glasgow, Scotland
14:00 CEST; 13:00 Local time		(Report); Note:	31' Quique; 36', 41' R. Navas; 51' Sánchez; 85' Jofre; 87' (pen.) Bueno	Stadium: Celtic F.C. Facilities; Referee: (Scotland) Jan McNew

18 August 2010	CA Osasuna (Spain)	0 – 1	Real Valladolid	Tafalla (Navarra)
19:30 CEST		(Report)	84' Calle; (yellow card) Bueno; (yellow card) Barragán	Stadium: San Francisco Stadium; Attendance: 1,500; Referee: (Spain) (Navarre) Berjano Ariztegui

==== Copa Castilla y León 2009–10 ====
The final of this tournament had to be played on April 23, 2010, the Castilla y León's day, but as both finalists had some problems in their leagues (Real Valladolid in Liga BBVA, finally relegated, and Salamanca in Liga Adelante), the final was postponed to the 2010–11 season.

Semi-finals
16 September 2009– Aranda de Duero
Arandina	0
Salamanca	5
8 September 2009– Palencia
Palencia	0
Real Valladolid	5

Final
16 November 2010– Villares de la Reina
Salamanca	2
Real Valladolid	1

8 September 2009 Semifinal	Palencia	0 – 5	Real Valladolid	Palencia
20:30 CEST	Agostinho (yellow card)	(Report)	9', 24' Costa; 46', 72' Bueno; 87' Canobbio	Stadium: Nueva Balastera; Attendance: 2,000; Referee: (Spain) (Castile and León) Valdés Aller

16 November 2010 Final	Salamanca	2 – 1	Real Valladolid	Villares de la Reina (Salamanca)
20:30 CET	Martín 42'; De la Nava (yellow card) 51'; García 60'; Ramos (yellow card) 83'		21', (yellow card) 87' R. Navas; (yellow card) 33' Lázaro	Stadium: El Helmántico; Attendance: 5,400; Referee: (Spain) (Castile and León) Gómez González

==== Copa Castilla y León 2010–11 ====
GROUP A	Pld	W	D	L	GF	GA	GD	Pts
(Spain) Palencia (Q)	2	2	0	0	4	1	+3	6
(Spain) Real Valladolid	2	1	0	1	1	2	–1	3
(Spain) Arandina	2	0	0	2	1	3	–2	0

25 July 2010 Group Stage	Arandina	0 – 1	Real Valladolid	Aranda de Duero (Burgos)
19:30 CEST		(Report)	38' Sisi	Stadium: El Montecillo; Attendance: 2,000; Referee: (Spain) (Castile and León) Rivero Guerra

30 July 2010 Group Stage	Palencia	2 – 0	Real Valladolid	Palencia
20:30 CEST	De Paula 25'; Aitor 52', (yellow card); Durántez (yellow card)	(Report)	(yellow card) Sisi	Stadium: Nueva Balastera; Attendance: 1,500; Referee: (Spain) (Castile and León) Franco Galván

==== 13th Ramón Losada Trophy ====
21 August 2010 Final	Real Oviedo (Spain)	0 – 0 (3 – 4 p)	Real Valladolid	Luarca (Asturias)
18:00 CEST	Pascual (yellow card)	(Report); Live TV: CyL 8		Stadium: La Veigona; Attendance: 1,000; Referee: (Spain) (Asturias) Areces Franco
	Penalties
	Negredo (penalty scored); Prosi (penalty missed); Ernesto (penalty missed); Artabe (penalty scored); Jhony (penalty scored)		(penalty missed) Bueno; (penalty scored) Barragán; (penalty scored) López; (penalty scored) Jacobo; (penalty scored) Quique

=== Liga Adelante ===
Matchday	1	2	3	4	5	6	7	8	9	10	11	12	13	14	15	16	17	18	19	20	21	22	23	24	25	26	27	28	29	30	31	32	33	34	35	36	37	38	39	40	41	42
Against	VilB	GRA	RHU	BET	ELC	ALB	PON	LPA	GIR	SAL	RYV	CEL	XER	CAR	FCBA	NUM	CÓR	TEN	NÀS	SDH	ALC	VilB	GRA	RHU	BET	ELC	ALB	PON	LPA	GIR	SAL	RYV	CEL	XER	CAR	FCBA	NUM	CÓR	TEN	NÀS	SDH	ALC
Venue	H	A	H	A	A	H	A	H	A	H	A	H	A	H	A	H	A	H	A	H	A	A	H	A	H	H	A	H	A	H	A	H	A	H	A	H	A	H	A	H	A	H
Position	3	2	1	5	7	8	7	6	7	5	6	5	6	7	6	10	11	12	12	11	12	15	16	14	14	12	12	11	13	11	9	9	7	7	7	7	7	7	7	7	7	7
Goal Average (useful in case of tie)																						Won	Lost	Won	Won	Won	D	Won	Won	Lost	Won	Lost	Won	Lost	Lost	Won	Lost	Won	Lost	D	Won	Won

Win Draw Lost

		All							Home							Away						
		Pts	W	D	L	F	A	Dif.	Pts	W	D	L	F	A	Dif.	Pts	W	D	L	F	A	Dif.
7	Real Valladolid (PO)	66	19	9	14	65	51	+14	48	15	3	3	45	20	+25	18	4	6	11	20	31	−11

Liga Adelante Winner (also promoted)
Direct promotion to Liga BBVA
Liga BBVA promotion play-offs
Relegation to Segunda División B

- With Antonio Gómez

27 August 2010 1	Real Valladolid	3 – 0	Villarreal B	Valladolid
21:00 CEST	Alonso (yellow card) 3'; Guerra 7'; Valiente (yellow card) 19'; Calle 71'; López 85'	(Report); Live TV: GolT & C+ Liga	(yellow card) 23' Falque; (red card) 47' Pérez; (yellow card) 79' Gullón	Stadium: Nuevo José Zorrilla; Attendance: 7,811; Referee: (Andalusia) Mariscal Sánchez

5 September 2010 2	Granada	0 – 1	Real Valladolid	Granada
19:00 CEST	Mainz (yellow card) 17'; Calvo (yellow card) 30'; Siqueira (yellow card) 66'; Abel (yellow card) 73'	(Report); Live TV: GolT	(yellow card) 15' Alonso; 23' Calle; (yellow card) 31' (yellow-red card) 65' Guilherme; (yellow card) 40' Jacobo; (yellow card) 63' Arzo; (yellow card) 67' Rubio	Stadium: Nuevo Los Cármenes; Attendance: 13,000; Referee: (Castilla–La Mancha) Ontanaya López

12 September 2010 3	Real Valladolid	4 – 0	Recreativo Huelva	Valladolid
12:00 CEST	Guerra 6', 50', (yellow card) 55'; Calle 19', 79'; Alonso (yellow card) 28'; Nauzet (yellow card) 71'	(Report); Live TV:	(yellow card) 20' Mora; (yellow card) 26' Kepa; (yellow card) 38' Villar; (yellow card) 52' Martínez; (yellow card) 68' Quillo	Stadium: Nuevo José Zorrilla; Attendance: 9,041; Referee: (Community of Madrid) Lesma López

19 September 2010 4	Real Betis	2 – 1	Real Valladolid	Sevilla
12:00 CEST	Vega (yellow card) 32'; Castro 47'; Belenguer (yellow card) 55'; Israel 64'; Beñat (yellow card) 75'; Lopes (yellow card) 84'	(Report); Live TV:	(yellow card) 1' Arzo; (yellow card) 20' (yellow-red card) 85' Guilherme; (yellow card) 30' Nauzet; 37' Valiente; (yellow card) 83' López; (yellow card) 89' Sisi	Stadium: Benito Villamarín; Referee: (Extremadura) Gil Manzano

26 September 2010 5	Elche	2 – 2	Real Valladolid	Elche (Alicante)
12:00 CEST	Mateo 46'; Samuel (yellow card) 55'; Albácar (yellow card) 61'; Caballero (red card) 79'; Perera (yellow card) 87'; Pelegrín 90+2'	(Report); Live TV:	43' Guerra; (yellow card) 51' Arzo; 80' (pen.) Alonso; (yellow card) 88' González	Stadium: Martínez Valero; Referee: (Community of Madrid) Del Cerro Grande

4 October 2010 6	Real Valladolid	1 – 1	Albacete	Valladolid
21:00 CEST	Alonso 66'; Sisi (yellow card) 76'	(Report); Live TV: GolT & C+ Liga	(yellow card) 18' Tortosa; 61' (pen.) Verza; (yellow card) 81' (yellow-red card) 90+1' Toni	Stadium: Nuevo José Zorrilla; Referee: (Aragon) Jaime Latre

10 October 2010 7	Ponferradina	1 – 1	Real Valladolid	Ponferrada (León)
19:00 CEST	Cuadrado (yellow card) 3'; Saizar (yellow card) 50', (goal) 81'	(Report); Live TV: GolT	(yellow card) 28' Valiente; (yellow card) 30' Sisi; (yellow card) 47' Jacobo; 57' Guerra; (yellow card) 70' López; (yellow card) 87' Arzo	Stadium: El Toralín; Referee: (Andalusia) Melero López

17 October 2010 8	Real Valladolid	3 – 0	Las Palmas	Valladolid
17:00 CEST	Rubio (yellow card) 9'; Alonso 22' (pen.), (yellow card) 56'; Arzo 44'; García 65' (o.g.); Nauzet (yellow card) 70'	(Report); Live TV: GolT & C+ Liga	(yellow card) 21' Aythami; (yellow card) 59' González; (yellow card) 90+1' Gómez	Stadium: Nuevo José Zorrilla; Referee: (Castilla–La Mancha) Pino Zamorano

24 October 2010 9	Girona	2 – 0	Real Valladolid	Girona
18:00 CEST	Peragón (yellow card) 48'; Moha (yellow card) 49'; Jandro 54' (pen.), (yellow card) 90+1'; Despotović 75'	(Report); Live TV:	(yellow card) 53' (yellow-red card) 90+1' Nauzet; (yellow card) 70' Arzo	Stadium: Montilivi; Referee: (Community of Madrid) Lesma López

31 October 2010 10	Real Valladolid	1 – 0	Salamanca	Valladolid
16:00 CEST	Sisi (yellow card) 26'; Valiente (yellow card) 29'; Calle (yellow card) 60'; Guerra 69', (yellow card) 82'; Figueras (yellow card) 76'; López (yellow card) 87'	(Report); Live TV:	(yellow card) 13' Kike	Stadium: Nuevo José Zorrilla; Referee: (Castilla–La Mancha) Ontanaya López

6 November 2010 11	Rayo Vallecano	3 – 0	Real Valladolid	Madrid
18:00 CET	Casado (yellow card) 18'; Armenteros 22', 81'; García (yellow card) 42'; Coke (yellow card) 56'; Fuego (yellow card) 58'; Lucas 67'	(Report); Live TV: LaOtra	(yellow card) 41' Arzo; (yellow card) 44' Nauzet; (yellow card) 70' Guilherme	Stadium: Teresa Rivero; Referee: (Andalusia) Mariscal Sánchez

14 November 2010 12	Real Valladolid	3 – 2	Celta Vigo	Valladolid
12:00 CET	Nauzet 4'; Calle (yellow card) 14'; Guerra 65'; Baraja (yellow card) 79'; López (red card) 86'; Alonso 90+4'	(Report); Live TV:	17' Trashorras; 36' De Lucas; (yellow card) 43' (yellow-red card) 82' Lago; (red card) 86' Mallo	Stadium: Nuevo José Zorrilla; Referee: (Catalonia) Miranda Torres

21 November 2010 13	Xerez	4 – 0	Real Valladolid	Jerez de la Frontera (Cádiz)
12:00 CET	Redondo (yellow card) 17', (goal) 63'; Lombán (yellow card) 44'; José Mari 56', 87', 90+4', (yellow card) 59'; Herrero (yellow card) 70'	(Report); Live TV:	(yellow card) 36' Baraja; (yellow card) 71' Antón; (yellow card) 82' Barragán	Stadium: Chapín; Referee: (Extremadura) Ceballos Silva

28 November 2010 14	Real Valladolid	0 – 1	Cartagena	Valladolid
17:00 CET	Arzo (yellow card) 14'; Guilherme (yellow card) 73'	(Report); Live TV: GolT & C+ Liga	(yellow card) 28' Cala; (yellow card) 64' Cygan; 77', (yellow card) 79' (yellow-red card) 89' Moral	Stadium: Nuevo José Zorrilla; Referee: (Balearic Islands) Sureda Cuenca

- With Javier Torres Gómez

4 December 2010 15	Barcelona Atlètic	0 – 0	Real Valladolid	Barcelona
18:00 CET	Romeu (yellow card) 62'; Riverola (yellow card) 79'; Carmona (yellow card) 89'	(Report); Live TV: Barça TV	(yellow card) 31' Arzo; (yellow card) 88' Rubio	Stadium: Miniestadi; Attendance: 2,348; Referee: (Galicia (Spain)) Amoedo Chas

- With Abel Resino

11 December 2010 16	Real Valladolid	4 – 5	Numancia	Valladolid
16:00 CET	Guerra 8', 22', 33'; Nauzet (yellow card) 67'; Arzo (yellow card) 71'; Valiente 84'	(Report); Live TV:	27', (yellow card) 87' Cedric; 45+1' Vélez; (yellow card) 51' Culebras; 68' (pen.), 72', 90+5' Barkero; (yellow card) 81' Nano	Stadium: Nuevo José Zorrilla; Referee: (Andalusia) Melero López

18 December 2010 17	Córdoba	1 – 0	Real Valladolid	Córdoba
18:00 CET	Luque (yellow card) 7'; Aguilar (yellow card) 20'; Riera (yellow card) 67'; Callejón 80'; Usero (yellow card) 90+1'	(Report)	(yellow card) 47' Arzo; (yellow card) 63' Barragán; (yellow card) 77' Rubio; (yellow card) 83' Sisi; (yellow card) 90+1' Guilherme	Stadium: Nuevo Arcángel; Referee: (Navarre) Prieto Iglesias

2 January 2011 18	Real Valladolid	2 – 2	Tenerife	Valladolid
18:00 CET	González 8'; Nauzet 26'; Guerra (yellow card) 50'; Rubio (yellow card) 70'; R. Navas (yellow card) 84'; Baraja (yellow card) 88'	(Report); Live TV: TV Canaria	10' Nino; (yellow card) 18' Béranger; (yellow card) 20' Álvarez; (yellow card) 24' Prieto; (yellow card) 50' Luna; (yellow card) 76', (goal) 85' Iriome	Stadium: Nuevo José Zorrilla; Attendance: 8,300; Referee: (Region of Murcia) Bernabé García

8 January 2011 19	Nàstic Tarragona	1 – 0	Real Valladolid	Tarragona
16:00 CET	Sergio (yellow card) 33'; Navarro 69'	(Report); Live TV:	(yellow card) 44' López; (yellow card) 60' Nauzet; (yellow card) 73' Rueda; (yellow card) 82' Barragán	Stadium: Nou Estadi; Referee: (Asturias) Piñeiro Crespo

15 January 2011 20	Real Valladolid	2 – 0	Huesca	Valladolid
18:00 CET	Guerra 31', 68', (yellow card) 44'; Sisi (yellow card) 49'; Villar (yellow card) 63'	(Report); Live TV: Aragón TV	(yellow card) 59' Echaide	Stadium: Nuevo José Zorrilla; Attendance: 8,000; Referee: (Andalusia) Pérez Montero

22 January 2011 21	Alcorcón	1 – 0	Real Valladolid	Alcorcón (Madrid)
16:00 CET	Sánchez (yellow card) 18'; Rueda (yellow card) 24'; Quini 73'	(Report); Live TV:	(yellow card) 22' Peña; (yellow card) 81' Nauzet	Stadium: Santo Domingo; Referee: (Catalonia) Miranda Torres

29 January 2011 22	Villarreal B	2 – 0	Real Valladolid	Vila-Real (Castellón)
18:00 CET	Bille 31'; Mano (yellow card) 43'; Insa (yellow card) 61'; Mariño (yellow card) 78'; Marquitos 90+2'	(Report); Live TV:	(yellow card) 17' Guerra; (yellow card) 33' Juanito; (yellow card) 53' Matabuena; (yellow card) 63' Jofre; (red card) 65' Jiménez; (yellow card) 65' Barragán; (yellow card) 72' González	Stadium: Ciudad Deportiva; Referee: (Castilla–La Mancha) Pino Zamorano

5 February 2011 23	Real Valladolid	2 – 3	Granada	Valladolid
16:00 CET	Nauzet 13' (pen.); López (yellow card) 25'; Matabuena (yellow card) 35'; González 57'; Faria (yellow card) 86'	(Report); Live TV:	2' Ighalo; (yellow card) 12' López; 43' Lucena; 81' Abel	Stadium: Nuevo José Zorrilla; Referee: (Galicia (Spain)) Amoedo Chas

12 February 2011 24	Recreativo Huelva	0 – 1	Real Valladolid	Huelva
18:00 CET	Matamala (yellow card) 24'; Gallardo (yellow card) 46'; Martínez (yellow card) 50'; Asen (yellow card) 53'	(Report)	(yellow card) 2' Nauzet; (red card) 43' González; 46' Guerra; (yellow card) 59' Figueras; (yellow card) 67' Villar; (yellow card) 87' Antón	Stadium: Nuevo Colombino; Attendance: 7,200; Referee: (Balearic Islands) Sureda Cuenca

20 February 2011 25	Real Valladolid	1 – 0	Real Betis	Valladolid
12:00 CET	Figueras (yellow card) 20'; Nafti (yellow card) 32'; Guerra 44'; Juanito (yellow card) 68'; Alonso (yellow card) 72'; Matabuena (yellow card) 84'	(Report); Live TV:	(yellow card) 48' Iriney; (yellow card) 65' Emana; (yellow card) 90' Isidoro	Stadium: Nuevo José Zorrilla; Attendance: 10,282; Referee: (Community of Madrid) Del Cerro Grande

26 February 2011 26	Real Valladolid	2 – 0	Elche	Valladolid
18:00 CET	Nauzet 9' (pen.); Baraja (red card) 66'; Jofre 78'; Barragán (yellow card) 85'	(Report)	(yellow card) 53' Verdés	Stadium: Nuevo José Zorrilla; Attendance: 9,048; Referee: (Catalonia) Miranda Torres

2 March 2011 27	Albacete	1 – 1	Real Valladolid	Albacete
20:00 CET	Calle 7', (yellow card) 84' (yellow-red card) 86'; Tato (yellow card) 76'; Toni (yellow card) 90'	(Report)	(yellow card) 22' Nafti; (yellow card) 57' Matabuena; 62' Antón; (red card) 67' Juanito; (yellow card) 90' Jiménez	Stadium: Carlos Belmonte; Referee: (Andalusia) Melero López

6 March 2011 28	Real Valladolid	2 – 1	Ponferradina	Valladolid
17:00 CET	Guerra 50', 89'	(Report)	(yellow card) 53' Cuadrado; 70' Saizar	Stadium: Nuevo José Zorrilla; Referee: (Valencian Community) Juan Martínez Munuera

12 March 2011 29	Las Palmas	2 – 0	Real Valladolid	Las Palmas de Gran Canaria
18:00 CET; 17:00 Local time	Ruymán (yellow card) 28'; Josico 42'; Pignol (yellow card) 47'; Aythami (yellow card) 52'; Javi (yellow card) 58'; Suárez (yellow card) 72'; Pollo (yellow card) 78'; Armiche 79'	(Report)	(yellow card) 30' Nauzet; (yellow card) 32' Barragán	Stadium: Gran Canaria; Attendance: 10,110; Referee: (Galicia (Spain)) Amoedo Chas

21 March 2011 30	Real Valladolid	1 – 0	Girona	Valladolid
21:00 CET	Peña (yellow card) 36'; Guerra (yellow card) 53', (goal) 84'	(Report); Live TV: GolT & C+ Liga	(yellow card) 55' Ángel; (yellow card) 80' Martínez	Stadium: Nuevo José Zorrilla; Attendance: 7,553; Referee: (Castilla–La Mancha) Pino Zamorano

27 March 2011 31	Salamanca	0 – 5	Real Valladolid	Villares de la Reina
12:00 CEST	Yuste (red card) 20'; Juanpa (yellow card) 51'; Rosas (yellow card) 60' (yellow-red card) 72'; Arbilla (yellow card) 74'	(Report); Live TV: GolT & C+ Liga	(yellow card) 32' Juanito; 49' González; (yellow card) 52' Nafti; 57', 66' Guerra; 81' Jofre; 85' Bacari	Stadium: El Helmántico; Referee: (Community of Madrid) Del Cerro Grande

2 April 2011 32	Real Valladolid	2 – 2	Rayo Vallecano	Valladolid
18:00 CEST	Figueras 43', (yellow card) 71'; Sisi 47'; Baraja (yellow card) 54'; Barragán (yellow card) 67'; Nafti (yellow card) 87'	(Report); Live TV: LaOtra	(yellow card) 38', (goal) 58' Delibašić; (yellow card) 50' Susaeta; (yellow card) 72' Casado; (yellow card) 75' Amaya; 86' Armenteros; (yellow card) 90+1' Arribas	Stadium: Nuevo José Zorrilla; Attendance: 10,690; Referee: (Asturias) Piñeiro Crespo

9 April 2011 33	Celta Vigo	1 – 2	Real Valladolid	Vigo (Pontevedra)
16:00 CEST	López Garai (yellow card) 16'; Vila (yellow card) 33'; Trashorras (yellow card) 44'; De Lucas 48'; Michu (yellow card) 66'; Fernández (yellow card) 72'	(Report); Live TV:	34' (pen.) Nauzet; (yellow card) 42' Baraja; 54' González; (yellow card) 58' Guerra; (yellow card) 60' Valiente; (yellow card) 62' Peña; (yellow card) 74' Barragán	Stadium: Balaídos; Referee: (Andalusia) Pérez Montero

17 April 2011 34	Real Valladolid	2 – 1	Xerez	Valladolid
17:00 CEST	Nafti (yellow card) 27'; Nauzet 65'; Guerra 90'	(Report); Live TV: GolT & C+ Liga	48' Lombán; (yellow card) 57' (yellow-red card) 90+3' Bermejo; (yellow card) 80' (yellow-red card) 82' Vega; (yellow card) 85' Llorente; (yellow card) 86' Bruno; (yellow card) 87' Chema; (yellow card) 90' (yellow-red card) 90+1' Mendoza	Stadium: Nuevo José Zorrilla; Attendance: 13,111; Referee: (Community of Madrid) Lesma López

23 April 2011 35	Cartagena	1 – 1	Real Valladolid	Cartagena (Murcia)
18:00 CEST	Riga (yellow card) 51'; Muñoz (yellow card) 71'; Goiria (yellow card) 78'; Toché 81'; Mariano (yellow card) 88'	(Report); Live TV: 7RM	5' Guerra; (yellow card) 26' (yellow-red card) 72' Matabuena; (yellow card) 81' Baraja; (yellow card) 87' Sisi	Stadium: Cartagonova; Attendance: 8,855; Referee: (Castilla–La Mancha) Ontanaya López

29 April 2011 36	Real Valladolid	2 – 1	Barcelona Atlètic	Valladolid
21:00 CEST	Peña (yellow card) 28'; Guerra 51', 90+3'; Baraja (yellow card) 71'	(Report); Live TV: GolT & C+ Liga	(yellow card) 20' Oriol; (yellow card) 37' (yellow-red card) 68' Carmona; (yellow card) 58' Muniesa; 61' Bartra; (yellow card) 65' Planas; (yellow card) 90+3' Oier	Stadium: Nuevo José Zorrilla; Attendance: 15,004; Referee: (Canary Islands) Hernández Hernández

7 May 2011 37	Numancia	3 – 3	Real Valladolid	Soria
18:00 CEST	Del Pino 60', (yellow card) 78'; Cedric (yellow card) 61'; Ibrahima 66', 75'; Lafuente (yellow card) 77'; Culebras (yellow card) 77'; Nagore (yellow card) 78'; Navarro (yellow card) 89'	(Report)	53' González; 63' (o.g.) Culebras; 77' (pen.) Nauzet; (yellow card) 89' Barragán	Stadium: Los Pajaritos; Referee: (Aragon) Jaime Latre

11 May 2011 38	Real Valladolid	5 – 1	Córdoba	Valladolid
21:00 CEST	Figueras 2'; González 22', 38'; Nafti (yellow card) 32', (goal) 35'; Barragán (yellow card) 54'; López (yellow card) 57'; Guerra 74'; Nauzet (yellow card) 87'	(Report); Live TV:	19' (o.g.) Matabuena; (yellow card) 28' Aguilar	Stadium: Nuevo José Zorrilla; Attendance: 9,088; Referee: (Navarre) Prieto Iglesias

14 May 2011 39	Tenerife	3 – 2	Real Valladolid	Santa Cruz de Tenerife
18:00 CEST; 17:00 Local time	Dubarbier 15'; Luna (red card) 21'; Ricardo (yellow card) 35'; Bertrán (yellow card) 41'; Luis García (yellow card) 54'; Sicilia (yellow card) 63'; Nino 66', 79'	(Report)	19' Guerra; 42', (yellow card) 65' Sisi; (yellow card) 82' Nafti; (yellow card) 85' González	Stadium: Heliodoro Rodríguez López; Attendance: 6,150; Referee: (Extremadura) Gil Manzano

21 May 2011 40	Real Valladolid	1 – 0	Nàstic Tarragona	Valladolid
16:00 CEST	Juanito (yellow card) 18'; González (yellow card) 33'; Guerra 50'; Peña (yellow card) 80'; Jiménez (yellow card) 88'	(Report); Live TV:	(yellow card) 25' Eloy; (yellow card) 57' Ruz	Stadium: Nuevo José Zorrilla; Attendance: 10,147; Referee: (Community of Madrid) Del Cerro Grande

29 May 2011 41	Huesca	1 – 0	Real Valladolid	Huesca
21:00 CEST	Camacho 5'; Sorribas (yellow card) 14'; Molinero (yellow card) 70'; Tariq (yellow card) 72'; Helguera (yellow card) 86'	(Report)	(yellow card) 28' Nauzet; (yellow card) 72' Jiménez; (yellow card) 88' Faria	Stadium: El Alcoraz; Referee: (Andalusia) Mariscal Sánchez

4 June 2011 42	Real Valladolid	2 – 0	Alcorcón	Valladolid
20:00 CEST	Guerra 9', 23'; Juanito (yellow card) 41'; Sisi (yellow card) 44'	(Report); Live TV: GolT & C+ Liga	(yellow card) 84' Pérez	Stadium: Nuevo José Zorrilla; Attendance: 15,413; Referee: (Catalonia) Miranda Torres

==== Promotion Play-off ====
Final winners were promoted to Liga BBVA. Granada and Celta Vigo played the other Semifinal.

===== Semifinal =====
9 June 2011 First leg	Real Valladolid	1 – 0	Elche	Valladolid
21:00 CEST	Nafti (yellow card) 34'; Guerra 59', (yellow card) 65'; González (yellow card) 68'	(Report); Live TV:	(yellow card) 52' Mantecón; (yellow card) 72' (yellow-red card) 83' Verdés; (yellow card) 86' Xumetra	Stadium: Nuevo José Zorrilla; Attendance: 21,812; Referee: (Andalusia) Pérez Montero

12 June 2011 Second leg	Elche	3 – 1	Real Valladolid	Elche (Alicante)
21:00 CEST	Mateo (yellow card) 36'; Albácar 43', 45+2'; Mantecón (yellow card) 44'; Cristóbal (yellow card) 46'; Ángel 57'; Carpio (yellow card) 64'; Acciari (yellow card) 87'	(Report); Live TV:	(yellow card) 20' Nafti; 22' González; (yellow card) 33' Rubio; (yellow card) 45+2', (red card) 90+6' Valiente; (yellow card) 84' Barragán; (yellow card) 90+3' Figueras; (yellow card) 90+5', (red card) 90+6' Nauzet	Stadium: Martínez Valero; Attendance: 25,000; Referee: (Galicia (Spain)) Amoedo Chas

Elche won 3–2 on aggregate and qualified for the Promotion play-off final. Real Valladolid stays in Liga Adelante.

=== Copa del Rey ===
==== Second Qualifying Round ====
1 September 2010	Real Valladolid	5 – 3	Las Palmas	Valladolid
20:30 CEST	Calle 28' (pen.), 33'; Peña (yellow card) 71'; Nauzet 75'; Álvaro Antón 80'; Jofre 86'	(Report); Live TV:	(red card) 20' Samu; 40' (pen.) Larena; (yellow card) 44' Ruymán; 81' Gómez; (yellow card) 85' Juanpe; 87' Vega	Stadium: Nuevo José Zorrilla; Attendance: 7,211; Referee: (Andalusia) Pérez Montero

==== Third Qualifying Round ====
8 September 2010	Real Valladolid	1 – 0	Huesca	Valladolid
20:00 CEST	Alonso 8' (pen.); Keita (yellow card) 24'; Javi Navas (yellow card) 30'; Barragán (yellow card) 33'; Figueras (yellow card) 69'; Sisi (yellow card) 75'	(Report)	(yellow card) 6' (yellow-red card) 61' Molinero; (yellow card) 33' Helguera; (yellow card) 41' Gallardo; (yellow card) 60' Sorribas	Stadium: Nuevo José Zorrilla; Attendance: 15,654; Referee: (Asturias) Piñeiro Crespo

==== Round of 32 ====
27 October 2010 First leg	Real Valladolid	0 – 2	Espanyol	Valladolid
21:00 CEST	Rueda (red card) 20'	(Report)	(yellow card) 36' García; 38', 54' Vázquez	Stadium: Nuevo José Zorrilla; Referee: (Cantabria) F. Teixeira Vitienes

9 November 2010 Second leg	Espanyol	1 – 1	Real Valladolid	Cornellà de Llobregat (Barcelona)
22:00 CET	Forlín (yellow card) 10'; Osvaldo 67'; Vilà (yellow card) 76'	(Report); Live TV: GolT & C+ Liga	(yellow card) 14' Antón; (yellow card) 26' Baraja; (yellow card) 29' Peña; (red card) 50' Jofre; (yellow card) 54' Calle; 76' (pen.) Barragán	Stadium: Nou Estadi Cornellà-El Prat; Referee: (Asturias) Muñiz Fernández

Espanyol won 3–1 on aggregate.

== Others ==
=== TV Partners ===
Real Valladolid's image rights stop belonging (from this season) to the group Prisa, proof of this is the broadcast of the matchday 1 against Villarreal B by GolT (Mediapro) and the second qualifying round of Copa del Rey by MARCA TV (Mediapro), this being the first football match broadcast by the TV channel born in August 2010.

=== Caso Ferreira ===
Caso Ferreira is the name given by Valladolid press to the lived scandal because of FIFA at Winter. During the Winter transfer window, Real Valladolid made official the transfer of the Uruguayan striker (who played in Bolivian Club Bolívar) William Ferreira during the night of January 31 to February 1, at the last hours of the transfer window. Once the player had moved to the city, after being introduced as a new signing and when he was about to be convened in early February, FIFA told Real Valladolid that the transfer had been completed after the deadline ended up, after 23:59 CEST on 31 January. Although Real Valladolid tried to prove it was a computer error, coming to claim the Higher Arbitration Court, his request was denied and the player was forced to return to Bolivia. Carlos Suárez, Real Valladolid president, said that he didn't rule out further bids for the striker in Summer, and was very unhappy with FIFA.
