= List of Spanish football transfers winter 2010–11 =

This is a list of Spanish football transfers for the January sale in the 2010–11 season of La Liga and Segunda División. Only moves from La Liga and Segunda División are listed.

The winter transfer window opened on 1 January 2011, although a few transfers took place prior to that date. The window closed at midnight on 1 February 2011. Players without a club could have joined one at any time, either during or in between transfer windows. Clubs below La Liga level could also have signed players on loan at any time. If need be, clubs could have signed a goalkeeper on an emergency loan, if all others were unavailable.

== List of Transfers ==
Date	Name	Moving from	Moving to	Fee
2010-09-08	(Italy) Maurizio Lanzaro	Free agent	(Spain) Real Zaragoza	Free
2010-09-09	(Netherlands) Saïd Boutahar	Free agent	(Spain) Real Zaragoza	Free
2010-11-15	(Netherlands) Ibrahim Afellay	(Netherlands) PSV Eindhoven	(Spain) FC Barcelona	€3m
2010-11-24	(Spain) Diego Camacho	Free agent	(Spain) Albacete Balompié	Free
2010-11-29	(Cameroon) Franck Songo'o	Free agent	(Spain) Albacete Balompié	Free
2010-11-30	(Spain) Juan Quero	(Spain) Rayo Vallecano	(Spain) UD Las Palmas	Loan
2010-12-06	(Brazil) Elias Mendes	(Brazil) Corinthians	(Spain) Atlético Madrid	€7m
2010-12-07	(Italy) Enzo Maresca	Free agent	(Spain) Málaga CF	Free
2010-12-09	(Bosnia and Herzegovina) Eldin Hadžić	(Spain) SD Eibar	(Spain) Hércules CF	Loan return
2010-12-09	(Bosnia and Herzegovina) Eldin Hadžić	(Spain) Hércules CF	(Spain) Orihuela CF	Loan
2010-12-14	(Portugal) Simão Sabrosa	(Spain) Atlético Madrid	(Turkey) Beşiktaş J.K.	Free
2010-12-14	(Portugal) Manuel Fernandes	(Spain) Valencia CF	(Turkey) Beşiktaş J.K.	Loan
2010-12-15	(Japan) Akihiro Ienaga	(Japan) Gamba Osaka	(Spain) RCD Mallorca	Free
2010-12-16	(Paraguay) Nelson Cuevas	(Spain) Albacete Balompié	(Mexico) Puebla F.C.	Free
2010-12-17	(Argentina) Juan Pablo Caffa	(Spain) Real Betis	(Argentina) Arsenal de Sarandí	Free
2010-12-24	(Argentina) Martín Demichelis	(Germany) FC Bayern Munich	(Spain) Málaga CF	Loan
2010-12-24	(Norway) Vadim Demidov	(Norway) Rosenborg BK	(Spain) Real Sociedad	Free
2010-12-26	(Spain) Baltasar Rigo	(Spain) UD Almería	(Spain) SD Huesca	Free
2010-12-27	(Brazil) Júlio Baptista	(Italy) A.S. Roma	(Spain) Málaga CF	€2m
2010-12-27	(Spain) Adrià Granell	(Spain) CD Alcoyano	(Spain) Albacete Balompié	Free
2010-12-27	(Algeria) Walid Cherfa	Free agent	(Spain) Albacete Balompié	Free
2010-12-27	(Spain) Pedro Barrancos	(Spain) Granada CF	(Spain) UD Logroñés	Loan
2010-12-28	(Nigeria) Odion Ighalo	(Italy) Udinese Calcio	(Spain) Granada CF	Loan
2010-12-28	(Spain) Ignacio Camacho	(Spain) Atlético Madrid	(Spain) Málaga CF	€1.5m
2010-12-28	(Spain) Sergio Asenjo	(Spain) Atlético Madrid	(Spain) Málaga CF	Loan
2010-12-29	(England) Jermaine Pennant	(Spain) Real Zaragoza	(England) Stoke City	€1.9m
2010-12-30	(Chile) Waldo Ponce	(Spain) Racing de Santander	(Chile) C.D. O'Higgins	Loan return
2010-12-30	(Spain) Edu Bedia	(Spain) Racing de Santander	(Spain) UD Salamanca	Loan
2010-12-31	(Argentina) Diego Valeri	(Spain) UD Almería	(Portugal) FC Porto	Loan return
2011-01-03	(France) Adil Rami	(France) Lille OSC	(Spain) Valencia CF	€6m
2011-01-03	(France) Adil Rami	(Spain) Valencia CF	(France) Lille OSC	Loan
2011-01-03	(Montenegro) Vladimir Gluščević	(Montenegro) FK Mogren	(Spain) Albacete Balompié	Free
2011-01-04	(Uruguay) Matías Alonso	(Spain) Granada CF	(Uruguay) C.A. Cerro	Loan
2011-01-05	(Spain) Edu Ramos	(Spain) Málaga CF	(Spain) CD Leganés	Loan
2011-01-07	(Spain) Martí Riverola	(Spain) FC Barcelona B	(Netherlands) Vitesse Arnhem	Loan
2011-01-07	(Austria) Pirmin Strasser	(Austria) SV Ried	(Spain) UD Almería	Free
2011-01-09	(Argentina) Leandro Gioda	(Argentina) C.A. Independiente	(Spain) Xerez CD	Loan
2011-01-11	(Spain) Álex Bergantiños	(Spain) Granada CF	(Spain) Deportivo de La Coruña	Loan return
2011-01-11	(Spain) Álex Bergantiños	(Spain) Deportivo de La Coruña	(Spain) Gimnàstic de Tarragona	Loan
2011-01-11	(Spain) Borja Viguera	(Spain) Real Sociedad	(Spain) Gimnàstic de Tarragona	Loan
2011-01-11	(Portugal) André Castro	(Portugal) FC Porto	(Spain) Sporting de Gijón	Loan
2011-01-11	(Spain) Víctor Ibáñez	(Spain) CD Castellón	(Spain) RCD Espanyol	Loan return
2011-01-11	(Spain) Víctor Ibáñez	(Spain) RCD Espanyol	(Spain) SD Eibar	Loan
2011-01-12	(Spain) Juanfran Torres	(Spain) CA Osasuna	(Spain) Atlético Madrid	€4m
2011-01-12	(Spain) Álvaro Cejudo	(Spain) UD Las Palmas	(Spain) CA Osasuna	€0.32m
2011-01-12	(Brazil) Wellington Silva	(England) Arsenal	(Spain) Levante UD	Loan
2011-01-13	(Spain) Sergio Matabuena	(Spain) Sporting de Gijón	(Spain) Real Valladolid	Free
2011-01-13	(Brazil) Cicinho	(Italy) A.S. Roma	(Spain) Villarreal CF	Loan
2011-01-14	(Argentina) Sebastián Dubarbier	(France) FC Lorient	(Spain) CD Tenerife	Loan
2011-01-14	(Argentina) Diego Buonanotte	(Argentina) River Plate	(Spain) Málaga CF	€4.5m
2011-01-14	(Argentina) Diego Buonanotte	(Spain) Málaga CF	(Argentina) River Plate	Loan
2011-01-14	(Spain) Gerardo Carrera	(Spain) Pontevedra CF	(Spain) AD Alcorcón	Free
2011-01-16	(Spain) Juanito	(Spain) Málaga CF	(Spain) UD Almería	Free
2011-01-18	(Portugal) Fábio Faria	(Portugal) S.L. Benfica	(Spain) Real Valladolid	Loan
2011-01-18	(Spain) Ferran Corominas	(Spain) RCD Espanyol	(Spain) CA Osasuna	Loan
2011-01-18	(Spain) Marc Mateu	(Spain) Real Unión	(Spain) Levante UD	Loan return
2011-01-18	(Spain) Marc Mateu	(Spain) Levante UD	(Spain) CD Badajoz	Loan
2011-01-19	(Spain) Toni Rodríguez	(Spain) Celta de Vigo	(Spain) SD Huesca	Loan
2011-01-19	(Nigeria) Sunny	(Spain) Valencia CF	(Spain) CD Numancia	Loan
2011-01-19	(Spain) Iñigo Díaz de Cerio	(Spain) Córdoba CF	(Spain) Athletic Bilbao	Loan return
2011-01-19	(Spain) Ion Vélez	(Spain) Athletic Bilbao	(Spain) CD Numancia	Loan
2011-01-19	(France) Abdoulay Konko	(Spain) Sevilla FC	(Italy) Genoa C.F.C.	€6m
2011-01-19	(Argentina) Leonardo Borzani	(Argentina) Racing Club de Avellaneda	(Spain) UD Las Palmas	Free
2011-01-19	(Argentina) Matías Lequi	(Greece) Iraklis	(Spain) UD Las Palmas	Free
2011-01-20	(Spain) Antonio Luna	(Spain) Sevilla FC	(Spain) UD Almería	Loan
2011-01-20	(Spain) Manuel Micó	(Spain) Orihuela CF	(Spain) Recreativo de Huelva	Free
2011-01-21	(Spain) César Arzo	(Spain) Real Valladolid	(Belgium) KAA Gent	Free
2011-01-24	(Spain) Marcos Landeira	(Spain) Sporting de Gijón	(Spain) Real Unión	Loan
2011-01-24	(Spain) Juanito Gutiérrez	(Spain) Atlético Madrid	(Spain) Real Valladolid	Free
2011-01-24	(Spain) Tuni	(Spain) RCD Mallorca	(Spain) Gimnàstic de Tarragona	Loan
2011-01-24	(Senegal) Guirane N'Daw	(France) AS Saint-Étienne	(Spain) Real Zaragoza	Loan
2011-01-24	(Brazil) Jonas Gonçalves	(Brazil) Grêmio	(Spain) Valencia CF	€1.2m
2011-01-25	(Equatorial Guinea) Javier Balboa	(Portugal) S.L. Benfica	(Spain) Albacete Balompié	Loan
2011-01-25	(United Arab Emirates) Tariq Spezie	(Spain) Granada CF	(Italy) Udinese Calcio	Loan return
2011-01-25	(United Arab Emirates) Tariq Spezie	(Italy) Udinese Calcio	(Spain) SD Huesca	Loan
2011-01-25	(Spain) Guillermo Pérez	(Spain) Sporting de Gijón B	(Spain) Albacete Balompié	Loan
2011-01-25	(Togo) Emmanuel Adebayor	(England) Manchester City	(Spain) Real Madrid	Loan
2011-01-25	(Guinea) Alhassane Keita	(Spain) Real Valladolid	(Spain) RCD Mallorca	Loan return
2011-01-25	(Guinea) Alhassane Keita	(Spain) RCD Mallorca	(Saudi Arabia) Al-Shabab Riyadh	Free
2011-01-26	(Brazil) Michel Schmöller	(Brazil) Brasiliense	(Spain) FC Cartagena	Free
2011-01-26	(Spain) Miguel Ángel Nieto	(Spain) UD Almería	(Spain) Xerez CD	Loan
2011-01-26	(Spain) David González	(Spain) Cádiz CF	(Spain) Málaga CF	Loan return
2011-01-26	(Spain) Urko Vera	(Spain) SD Lemona	(Spain) Athletic Bilbao	Free
2011-01-26	(Spain) Juan Domínguez	(Spain) Gimnàstic de Tarragona	(Spain) SD Eibar	Loan
2011-01-27	(Spain) Keko	(Spain) FC Cartagena	(Spain) Atlético Madrid	Loan return
2011-01-27	(Spain) Keko	(Spain) Atlético Madrid	(Spain) Girona FC	Loan
2011-01-27	(Spain) Juanpa	Free agent	(Spain) UD Salamanca	Free
2011-01-27	(Spain) Víctor Ruiz	(Spain) RCD Espanyol	(Italy) S.S.C. Napoli	€6m
2011-01-27	(Croatia) Ivan Rakitić	(Germany) Schalke 04	(Spain) Sevilla FC	€1.5m
2011-01-27	(Chile) Gary Medel	(Chile) Universidad Católica	(Spain) Sevilla FC	€3m
2011-01-27	(Malawi) Tam Nsaliwa	Free agent	(Spain) SD Ponferradina	Free
2011-01-27	(Spain) Adrien Goñi	(Spain) Athletic Bilbao	(Spain) Girona FC	Free
2011-01-27	(Spain) Iván González	(Spain) Málaga CF	(Spain) Real Madrid Castilla	Loan
2011-01-27	(Spain) Fran Amado	(Spain) Albacete Balompié	(Spain) Pontevedra CF	Loan
2011-01-27	(Morocco) Nabil Baha	(Spain) Málaga CF	(Greece) AEK Athens	Free
2011-01-27	(Mali) Mahamadou Diarra	(Spain) Real Madrid	(France) AS Monaco	Free
2011-01-28	(Spain) Dídac Vilà	(Spain) RCD Espanyol	(Italy) A.C. Milan	€4m
2011-01-28	(Serbia) Marko Lukić	(Spain) SD Huesca	(Spain) CD La Muela	Loan
2011-01-28	(Spain) Rafael Santacruz	(Spain) Albacete Balompié	(Spain) Lucena CF	Free
2011-01-28	(Uruguay) Sebastián Balsas	(Argentina) San Lorenzo de Almagro	(Spain) CD Tenerife	Loan
2011-01-28	(Spain) Acorán Barrera	(Spain) CD Puertollano	(Spain) SD Ponferradina	Free
2011-01-28	(France) Sofiane Feghouli	(Spain) Valencia CF	(Spain) UD Almería	Loan
2011-01-28	(Spain) Abraham González	(Spain) Gimnàstic de Tarragona	(Spain) SD Ponferradina	Loan
2011-01-29	(Spain) Juande	(Spain) Real Betis	(Spain) Granada CF	Loan
2011-01-29	(Brazil) Igor de Souza	(Spain) Pontevedra CF	(Spain) CD Tenerife	Loan
2011-01-29	(Spain) José Antonio Llamas	(Spain) Granada CF	(Spain) UD Melilla	Free
2011-01-29	(Spain) Miguel Ángel Riau	(Spain) FC Cartagena	(Spain) Valencia CF Mestalla	Loan
2011-01-29	(Portugal) Edinho	(Spain) Málaga CF	(Portugal) C.S. Marítimo	Loan
2011-01-29	(Argentina) José Sand	(United Arab Emirates) Al Ain S.C.C.	(Spain) Deportivo de La Coruña	Loan
2011-01-30	(Spain) Asen	(Spain) Albacete Balompié	(Spain) Recreativo de Huelva	Free
2011-01-30	(Spain) Borja Granero	(Spain) Valencia CF Mestalla	(Spain) Recreativo de Huelva	Free
2011-01-30	(Spain) Kike Tortosa	(Spain) Valencia CF Mestalla	(Spain) Recreativo de Huelva	Free
2011-01-30	(Spain) Xisco	(England) Newcastle United	(Spain) Deportivo de La Coruña	Loan
2011-01-30	(Spain) Javito	(Greece) Aris Thessaloniki	(Spain) Deportivo de La Coruña	Loan
2011-01-31	(Spain) David Mateos	(Spain) Real Madrid	(Greece) AEK Athens	Loan
2011-01-31	(Paraguay) Paulo da Silva	(England) Sunderland	(Spain) Real Zaragoza	Free
2011-01-31	(Spain) Diego Antón	(Spain) CD Numancia	(Spain) Peña Sport FC	Loan
2011-01-31	(Ecuador) Jefferson Montero	(Spain) Villarreal CF	(Spain) Levante UD	Loan
2011-01-31	(Argentina) Fernando Cavenaghi	(Spain) RCD Mallorca	(France) FC Girondins de Bordeaux	Loan return
2011-01-31	(Spain) Rodri	(Spain) Real Betis	(Spain) FC Cartagena	Loan
2011-01-31	(Spain) Rubén Rochina	(Spain) FC Barcelona B	(England) Blackburn Rovers	Free
2011-01-31	(Democratic Republic of the Congo) Ritchie Kitoko	(Spain) Granada CF	(Italy) Udinese Calcio	Loan return
2011-01-31	(Democratic Republic of the Congo) Ritchie Kitoko	(Italy) Udinese Calcio	(Spain) CD Tenerife	Loan
2011-01-31	(Tunisia) Mehdi Nafti	(Greece) Aris Thessaloniki	(Spain) Real Valladolid	Free
2011-01-31	(Ghana) Wakaso Mubarak	(Spain) Elche CF	(Spain) Villarreal CF B	Free
2011-01-31	(Portugal) Ricardo Pereira	(Spain) Real Betis	(England) Leicester City	Free
2011-01-31	(Spain) José Carlos	(Spain) Sevilla FC	(Spain) FC Cartagena	Loan
2011-01-31	(Spain) Antonio Calle	(Spain) Real Valladolid	(Spain) Albacete Balompié	Free
2011-01-31	(Spain) Álex Cruz	(Spain) Gimnàstic de Tarragona	(Spain) Granada CF	Free
2011-01-31	(Spain) Felipe Sanchón	(Spain) Granada CF	(Spain) Gimnàstic de Tarragona	Loan
2011-01-31	(Spain) Asier Arranz	(Spain) CD Numancia	(Spain) CD Teruel	Loan
2011-01-31	(Mexico) Giovani dos Santos	(England) Tottenham Hotspur	(Spain) Racing de Santander	Loan
2011-01-31	(Senegal) César Diop	(Spain) Gimnàstic de Tarragona	(Spain) Lorca Atlético CF	Loan
2011-01-31	(Spain) Ander Herrera	(Spain) Real Zaragoza	(Spain) Athletic Bilbao	€7m
2011-01-31	(Spain) Ander Herrera	(Spain) Athletic Bilbao	(Spain) Real Zaragoza	Loan
2011-01-31	(Argentina) Emanuel Biancucchi	(Germany) TSV 1860 München	(Spain) Girona FC	Free
2011-01-31	(Uruguay) Nacho González	(Spain) Levante UD	(Spain) Valencia CF	Loan return
2011-02-01	(Norway) Knut Olav Rindarøy	(Spain) Deportivo de La Coruña	(Norway) Molde FK	Loan return
2011-02-01	(Uruguay) Jonathan Urretavizcaya	(Spain) Deportivo de La Coruña	(Portugal) S.L. Benfica	Loan return
2011-02-01	(Spain) Rubén Rochina	(Spain) FC Barcelona	(England) Blackburn Rovers	€0.45m
2011-02-01	(United States) Jozy Altidore	(Spain) Villarreal CF	(Turkey) Bursaspor	Loan
2011-02-01	(Angola) Manucho	(Spain) Real Valladolid	(Turkey) Manisaspor	Loan
2011-02-10	(Argentina) Wilfredo Caballero	(Spain) Elche CF	(Spain) Málaga CF	€0.9m
2011-02-28	(Spain) Borja Gómez	(Spain) Rayo Vallecano	(Ukraine) FC Karpaty Lviv	Free
2011-03-02	(Chile) Nicolás Medina	(Spain) CA Osasuna	(Bulgaria) PFC Akademik Sofia	Free
2011-03-03	(Spain) Sergio Rodríguez	(Spain) Hércules CF	(Russia) FC Spartak Moscow	€0.4m
2011-03-05	(Spain) Iñigo Pérez	(Spain) Athletic Bilbao	(Spain) SD Huesca	Loan
2011-03-11	(Brazil) Luís Fabiano	(Spain) Sevilla FC	(Brazil) São Paulo FC	€11m
2011-03-17	(Spain) Albert Virgili	(Spain) Pobla de Mafumet CF	(Spain) Gimnàstic de Tarragona	Free
2011-03-22	(Netherlands) Riga Mustapha	Free agent	(Spain) FC Cartagena	Free
2011-03-31	(Spain) Cristóbal Márquez	(Spain) Villarreal CF	(Spain) Elche CF	Loan
2011-04-19	(Colombia) Luis Muriel	(Spain) Granada CF	(Italy) Udinese Calcio	Loan return

== See also ==
- List of Spanish football transfers summer 2010
