= 2008–09 CD Tenerife season =

Tenerife
2008–09 season
- Head coach: José Luis Oltra
- Stadium: Estadio Heliodoro Rodríguez López
- Segunda División: 3rd (promoted)
- Copa del Rey: Round of 32
- Top goalscorer: League: Nino (29); All: Nino (29)
- Average home league attendance: 16,899
Home colours	Away colours

The 2008–09 season was the 97th season in the history of CD Tenerife and the club's seventh consecutive season in the second division of Spanish football. In addition to the domestic league, Tenerife participated in this season's edition of the Copa del Rey. The season covered the period from 1 July 2008 to 30 June 2009.

== Players ==
Note: Flags indicate national team as defined under FIFA eligibility rules; some limited exceptions apply. Players may hold more than one non-FIFA nationality.

No.	Pos.	Nation	Player
1	GK	ESP	Luis García
2	DF	ESP	Marc Bertrán
3	DF	ESP	Héctor
4	DF	ESP	Rafael Clavero
5	MF	ESP	Manuel Martínez
6	DF	ESP	Pablo Sicilia
7	FW	ESP	Nino
8	MF	ESP	Ricardo
9	FW	ESP	Ángel
10	MF	ESP	Ayoze
11	FW	ESP	Cristo

No.	Pos.	Nation	Player
13	GK	ESP	Sergio Aragoneses
14	FW	CMR	Daniel Kome
15	MF	ESP	Iriome
16	FW	ESP	Gaizka Saizar
17	MF	ESP	Juanlu
19	DF	ARG	Ezequiel Luna
20	MF	ESP	Richi
21	MF	ESP	Alejandro Alfaro
23	MF	ESP	Mikel Alonso
24	DF	ESP	José Antonio Culebras

== Competitions ==
=== Overall record ===
Competition	First match	Last match	Starting round	Final position	Record							
Competition	First match	Last match	Starting round	Final position	Pld	W	D	L	GF	GA	GD	Win %
Segunda División	30 August 2008	21 June 2009	Matchday 1	3rd	42	24	9	9	79	47	+32	57.14
Copa del Rey	3 September 2008	8 October 2008	Second round	Third round	2	1	1	0	3	2	+1	50.00
Total					44	25	10	9	82	49	+33	56.82

Source: Competitions

=== Segunda División ===
==== League table ====
Pos	Team	Pld	W	D	L	GF	GA	GD	Pts	Promotion or relegation
1	Xerez (C, P)	42	24	10	8	73	42	+31	82	Promotion to La Liga
2	Zaragoza (P)	42	23	12	7	79	42	+37	81 (Note: TEN 1–2 ZAR; ZAR 1–1 TEN)	Promotion to La Liga
3	Tenerife (P)	42	24	9	9	79	47	+32	81	Promotion to La Liga
4	Hércules	42	21	15	6	82	43	+39	78	
5	Rayo Vallecano	42	18	16	8	55	39	+16	70	

Source: LFP – Liga Adelante
Rules for classification: 1st points; 2nd head-to-head points; 3rd head-to-head goal difference; 4th head-to-head goals scored; 5th goal difference; 6th number of goals scored; 7th Fair-play points
(C) Champions; (P) Promoted

==== Results summary ====
Overall								Home						Away					
Pld	W	D	L	GF	GA	GD	Pts	W	D	L	GF	GA	GD	W	D	L	GF	GA	GD
42	24	9	9	79	47	+32	81	15	3	3	49	21	+28	9	6	6	30	26	+4

Source: Segunda División

==== Results by round ====
Round	1	2	3	4	5	6	7	8	9	10	11	12	13	14	15	16	17	18	19	20	21	22	23	24	25	26	27	28	29	30	31	32	33	34	35	36	37	38	39	40	41	42
Ground	H	A	A	H	A	H	A	H	A	H	A	H	A	H	A	H	A	H	A	H	A	A	H	H	A	H	A	H	A	H	A	H	A	H	A	H	A	H	A	H	A	H
Result	W	L	W	D	L	W	W	L	L	W	L	D	W	L	D	W	W	W	L	W	D	W	W	W	D	W	D	D	W	W	D	W	W	W	D	W	L	W	W	W	W	L
Position	2	11	5	7	9	3	3	5	8	6	7	8	7	9	10	8	5	4	4	3	2	2	2	2	2	2	2	3	2	1	3	2	2	2	2	2	2	2	2	1	1	3

Source: Segunda División
A = Away; H = Home; W = Win; D = Draw; L = Loss

==== Matches ====
30 August 2008 1	Tenerife	3–2	Gimnàstic de Tarragona	Santa Cruz de Tenerife
--:-- CEST (UTC+2)				Stadium: Estadio Heliodoro Rodríguez López

6 September 2008 3	Eibar	3–2	Tenerife	Eibar
--:-- CEST (UTC+2)				Stadium: Ipurua Municipal Stadium

14 September 2008 3	Elche	2–4	Tenerife	Elche
--:-- CEST (UTC+2)				Stadium: Martínez Valero

21 September 2008 4	Tenerife	1–1	Huesca	Santa Cruz de Tenerife
--:-- CEST (UTC+2)				Stadium: Estadio Heliodoro Rodríguez López

28 September 2008 5	Celta Vigo	2–1	Tenerife	Vigo
--:-- CEST (UTC+2)				Stadium: Balaídos

4 October 2008 6	Tenerife	3–1	Alicante	Santa Cruz de Tenerife
--:-- CEST (UTC+2)				Stadium: Estadio Heliodoro Rodríguez López

12 October 2008 7	Albacete	0–1	Tenerife	Albacete
--:-- CEST (UTC+2)				Stadium: Estadio Carlos Belmonte

18 October 2008 8	Tenerife	2–3	Salamanca	Santa Cruz de Tenerife
--:-- CEST (UTC+2)				Stadium: Estadio Heliodoro Rodríguez López

25 October 2008 9	Córdoba	2–0	Tenerife	Córdoba
--:-- CEST (UTC+2)				Stadium: Estadio Nuevo Arcángel

2 November 2008 10	Tenerife	2–0	Rayo Vallecano	Santa Cruz de Tenerife
--:-- CET (UTC+1)				Stadium: Estadio Heliodoro Rodríguez López

8 November 2008 11	Levante	2–1	Tenerife	Valencia
--:-- CET (UTC+1)				Stadium: Ciutat de València

16 November 2008 12	Tenerife	1–1	Real Sociedad	Santa Cruz de Tenerife
--:-- CET (UTC+1)				Stadium: Estadio Heliodoro Rodríguez López

22 November 2008 13	Las Palmas	0–1	Tenerife	Las Palmas
--:-- CET (UTC+1)				Stadium: Estadio Gran Canaria

30 November 2008 14	Tenerife	1–2	Zaragoza	Santa Cruz de Tenerife
--:-- CET (UTC+1)				Stadium: Estadio Heliodoro Rodríguez López

7 December 2008 15	Murcia	2–2	Tenerife	Murcia
--:-- CET (UTC+1)				Stadium: Estadio Nueva Condomina

14 December 2008 16	Tenerife	3–2	Hércules	Santa Cruz de Tenerife
--:-- CET (UTC+1)				Stadium: Estadio Heliodoro Rodríguez López

21 December 2008 17	Alavés	1–2	Tenerife	Vitoria-Gasteiz
--:-- CET (UTC+1)				Stadium: Mendizorrotza Stadium

4 January 2009 18	Tenerife	2–1	Sevilla Atlético	Santa Cruz de Tenerife
--:-- CET (UTC+1)				Stadium: Estadio Heliodoro Rodríguez López

11 January 2009 19	Xerez	2–0	Tenerife	Jerez de la Frontera
--:-- CET (UTC+1)				Stadium: Estadio Municipal de Chapín

18 January 2009 20	Tenerife	4–1	Girona	Santa Cruz de Tenerife
--:-- CET (UTC+1)				Stadium: Estadio Heliodoro Rodríguez López

24 January 2009 21	Castellón	2–2	Tenerife	Castellón de la Plana
--:-- CET (UTC+1)				Stadium: Nou Estadi Castàlia

1 February 2009 22	Gimnàstic de Tarragona	0–1	Tenerife	Tarragona
--:-- CET (UTC+1)				Stadium: Nou Estadi de Tarragona

8 February 2009 23	Tenerife	2–0	Eibar	Santa Cruz de Tenerife
--:-- CET (UTC+1)				Stadium: Estadio Heliodoro Rodríguez López

15 February 2009 24	Tenerife	3–2	Elche	Santa Cruz de Tenerife
--:-- CET (UTC+1)				Stadium: Estadio Heliodoro Rodríguez López

21 February 2009 25	Huesca	0–0	Tenerife	Huesca
--:-- CET (UTC+1)				Stadium: El Alcoraz

1 March 2009 26	Tenerife	3–0	Celta Vigo	Santa Cruz de Tenerife
--:-- CET (UTC+1)				Stadium: Estadio Heliodoro Rodríguez López

7 March 2009 27	Alicante	2–2	Tenerife	Alicante
--:-- CET (UTC+1)				Stadium: José Rico Pérez

15 March 2009 28	Tenerife	1–1	Albacete	Santa Cruz de Tenerife
--:-- CET (UTC+1)				Stadium: Estadio Heliodoro Rodríguez López

21 March 2009 29	Salamanca	1–2	Tenerife	Villares de la Reina
--:-- CET (UTC+1)				Stadium: Helmántico Stadium

29 March 2009 30	Tenerife	2–0	Córdoba	Santa Cruz de Tenerife
--:-- CET (UTC+1)				Stadium: Estadio Heliodoro Rodríguez López

4 April 2009 31	Rayo Vallecano	0–0	Tenerife	Madrid
--:-- CEST (UTC+2)				Stadium: Campo de Fútbol de Vallecas

12 April 2009 32	Tenerife	5–1	Levante	Santa Cruz de Tenerife
--:-- CEST (UTC+2)				Stadium: Estadio Heliodoro Rodríguez López

18 April 2009 33	Real Sociedad	1–2	Tenerife	San Sebastián
--:-- CEST (UTC+2)				Stadium: Anoeta Stadium

25 April 2009 34	Tenerife	2–0	Las Palmas	Santa Cruz de Tenerife
--:-- CEST (UTC+2)				Stadium: Estadio Heliodoro Rodríguez López

2 May 2009 35	Zaragoza	1–1	Tenerife	Zaragoza
--:-- CEST (UTC+2)				Stadium: La Romareda

10 May 2009 36	Tenerife	3–1	Murcia	Santa Cruz de Tenerife
--:-- CEST (UTC+2)				Stadium: Estadio Heliodoro Rodríguez López

16 May 2009 37	Hércules	3–1	Tenerife	Alicante
--:-- CEST (UTC+2)				Stadium: José Rico Pérez; Referee: José Luis González González

24 May 2009 38	Tenerife	3–0	Alavés	Santa Cruz de Tenerife
--:-- CEST (UTC+2)				Stadium: Estadio Heliodoro Rodríguez López; Referee: Carlos del Cerro Grande

30 May 2009 39	Sevilla Atlético	0–4	Hércules	Sevilla
--:-- CEST (UTC+2)				Stadium: Ramón Sánchez Pizjuán; Referee: Alfonso Pino Zamorano

7 June 2009 40	Tenerife	2–0	Xerez	Santa Cruz de Tenerife
--:-- CEST (UTC+2)				Stadium: Estadio Heliodoro Rodríguez López; Referee: Ignacio Iglesias Villanueva

13 June 2009 41	Girona	0–1	Tenerife	Girona
--:-- CEST (UTC+2)			Kome 40'	Stadium: Montilivi; Referee: Francisco Ontanaya López

21 June 2009 42	Tenerife	1–2	Castellón	Santa Cruz de Tenerife
--:-- CEST (UTC+2)				Stadium: Estadio Heliodoro Rodríguez López; Referee: Fernando Teixeira Vitienes

=== Copa del Rey ===
3 September 2008 Second round	Tenerife	2–1	Córdoba	Santa Cruz de Tenerife
--:-- CEST (UTC+2)				Stadium: Estadio Heliodoro Rodríguez López

8 October 2008 Third round	Elche	1–1 (a.e.t.) (4–3 p)	Tenerife	Elche
--:-- CEST (UTC+2)				Stadium: Martínez Valero; Attendance: 1,812; Referee: Alfonso Pino Zamorano
