= Kike Tortosa =

Kike Tortosa may refer to:

- Kike Tortosa (footballer, born 1983), Spanish footballer
- Kike Tortosa (footballer, born 1991), Spanish footballer
