= José Salcedo =

José Salcedo may refer to:

- José Antonio Salcedo (1816–1864), head of state of the Dominican Republic
- José Luis Salcedo Bastardo (1926–2005), Venezuelan historian and diplomat
- José Salcedo (film editor) (1949–2017), Spanish film editor
- José Salcedo (Chilean footballer) (born 1980), Chilean footballer
- José Antonio Salcedo (footballer) (born 1990), Spanish footballer
- Domingo Salcedo (José Domingo Salcedo González; born 1983), Paraguayan football midfielder

== See also ==
- José Ulises Macías Salcedo (born 1940), Mexican archbishop of the Archdiocese of Hermosillo
- Juan José de Vértiz y Salcedo (1719–1799), Spanish colonial politician
