= Baraja =

This could refer to:

- Baraja (playing cards), a Spanish set of playing cards.
- Rubén Baraja, a Spanish football (soccer) player.
- Javier Baraja, a Spanish football (soccer) player.
