= UD Salamanca B =

Salamanca B
- Full name: Unión Deportiva Salamanca, S.A.D. "B"
- Nickname: Salmantino
- Founded: 1952
- Dissolved: 2013
- Ground: Pistas del Helmántico; Villares de la Reina, Castille and León, Spain
- Capacity: 5,500
- Chairman: (Spain) Francisco Hernández
- Manager: (Spain) José María Hernández
- League: none
- 2012–13: 3ª – Group 8, 15th (relegated)
Home colours	Away colours

Unión Deportiva Salamanca "B", also known as Club Deportivo Salmantino, was a Spanish football team based in Salamanca, in the autonomous community of Castile and León. Founded on 22 October 1952, it was the reserve team of UD Salamanca, and last played in Tercera División – Group 8, holding home games at Pistas del Helmántico, which seats 5,500 spectators.

== History ==
The club was founded as farm team of UD Salamanca, named Club de Fútbol Salmantino on 30 July 1943. This first club project only lasted four seasons and UD Salamanca had to set it aside for a while in 1947, probably because of economical reasons.

It wasn't until the 1953–54 season that the project was resumed. The club had to be named Club Deportivo Salmantino, and it acted as the reserve team, for players that did not use to play with the main team of UD Salamanca. The colours chosen to play were purple for the T-shirt and white for the pants, even though Salmantino came back to the traditional black and white at the request of some UDS presidents.

In 1997 both entities merged, the team was renamed Unión Deportiva Salamanca B, became the main side's reserve team and started competing in Tercera División. With the dissolution of UD Salamanca on 18 June 2013 due to accumulated debts, Salamanca B also dissolved with the main side, immediately after it was forcibly relegated to the Primera División Regional of Castila & León.

A new club was later formed, taking the name Club de Fútbol Salmantino. It played in Tercera División its two first seasons, inheriting the place of Salamanca B, before being relegated to the last tier as it is considered a completely different club.

=== Club background ===
- CD Salmantino (1952–97)
- UD Salamanca "B" (1997–2013)

== Season to season ==
- As farm team

Season	Tier	Division	Place	Copa del Rey
1952–1956	―	Regional	―	
1956–57	3	3ª	17th	
1957–58	4	1ª Reg.		
1958–59	4	1ª Reg.	4th	
1959–60	4	1ª Reg.	1st	
1960–61	3	3ª	8th	
1961–62	3	3ª	7th	
1962–63	3	3ª	6th	
1963–64	3	3ª	5th	
1964–65	3	3ª	16th	
1965–66	4	1ª Reg.	1st	
1966–67	3	3ª	14th	
1967–68	3	3ª	14th	
1968–69	4	1ª Reg.	2nd	
1969–70	4	1ª Reg.	2nd	
1970–71	4	Reg. Pref.	4th	
1971–72	4	Reg. Pref.	2nd	
1972–73	4	Reg. Pref.	1st	
1973–74	3	3ª	14th	First round
1974–75	3	3ª	14th	First round

Season	Tier	Division	Place	Copa del Rey
1975–76	3	3ª	17th	First round
1976–77	4	Reg. Pref.	2nd	
1977–78	4	3ª	14th	First round
1978–79	4	3ª	19th	
1979–80	4	3ª	2nd	
1980–81	4	3ª	6th	
1981–82	4	3ª	2nd	
1982–83	4	3ª	10th	
1983–84	4	3ª	7th	
1984–85	4	3ª	5th	
1985–86	4	3ª	4th	
1986–87	4	3ª	7th	
1987–88	4	3ª	14th	
1988–89	4	3ª	6th	
1989–90	4	3ª	3rd	
1990–91	4	3ª	10th	
1991–92	4	3ª	5th	
1992–93	4	3ª	8th	
1993–94	4	3ª	2nd	
1994–95	4	3ª	2nd	

Season	Tier	Division	Place	Copa del Rey
1995–96	4	3ª	13th	
1996–97	4	3ª	3rd	

- Merger with UD Salamanca

Season	Tier	Division	Place
1997–98	4	3ª	4th
1998–99	4	3ª	12th
1999–2000	4	3ª	1st
2000–01	4	3ª	3rd
2001–02	4	3ª	13th
2002–03	4	3ª	8th
2003–04	4	3ª	7th
2004–05	4	3ª	6th

Season	Tier	Division	Place
2005–06	4	3ª	10th
2006–07	4	3ª	12th
2007–08	4	3ª	6th
2008–09	4	3ª	10th
2009–10	4	3ª	18th
2010–11	5	1ª Reg.	1st
2011–12	4	3ª	14th
2012–13	4	3ª	15th

- 45 seasons in Tercera División

== Former players ==
- (Spain) Jorge Alonso
- (Spain) Toti
- (Spain) Osmar Barba
- (Spain) Carlos Valverde
- (Spain) David Montero
- (Spain) Juanpa
- (Taiwan) Víctor Chou
- (Venezuela) Gianfranco Di Julio
