= Gianfranco Di Julio =

Venezuelan footballer (born 1986)

Personal information
- Full name: Gianfranco Di Julio
- Date of birth: 5 July 1986 (age 40)
- Place of birth: Caracas, Venezuela
- Height: 1.76 m (5 ft 9 in)
- Position: Midfielder

Senior career*
Years	Team	Apps	(Gls)
2003–2004	Isernia		
2004–2005	Chieti		
2005–2006	Gela		
2006	Santegidiese		
2007	Montesilvano		
2007	Villarreal C		
2008	Salamanca B		
2008–2009	Centro Italo	0	(0)
2009–2011	Deportivo Italia	23	(1)
2009–2011	Deportivo Petare	38	(0)
2012	Yaracuyanos F.C.	17	(0)
2012–2013	Atlético Venezuela	22	(1)
2013–2014	Giulianova Calcio		
2014–2016	Recanatese 1923		

International career
2005	Venezuela U20	0	(0)
- * Club domestic league appearances and goals as of 14:14, 7 March 2021 (UTC)

Gianfranco Di Julio (born 7 July 1986) was an Italian–Venezuelan footballer.

== Career ==
Di Julio participated in the Venezuela national under-20 football team in 2005. He began his career with several clubs in his native Italy, including Calcio Chieti. In 2007, Di Julio continued his career in Spain, playing for Villarreal CF C and then UD Salamanca B.

In the second semester of 2008, Di Julio moved to Venezuela for play in Centro Italo. In 2009, he signed for Deportivo Italia.
