= Jorge Alonso (footballer) =

Spanish footballer (born 1985)

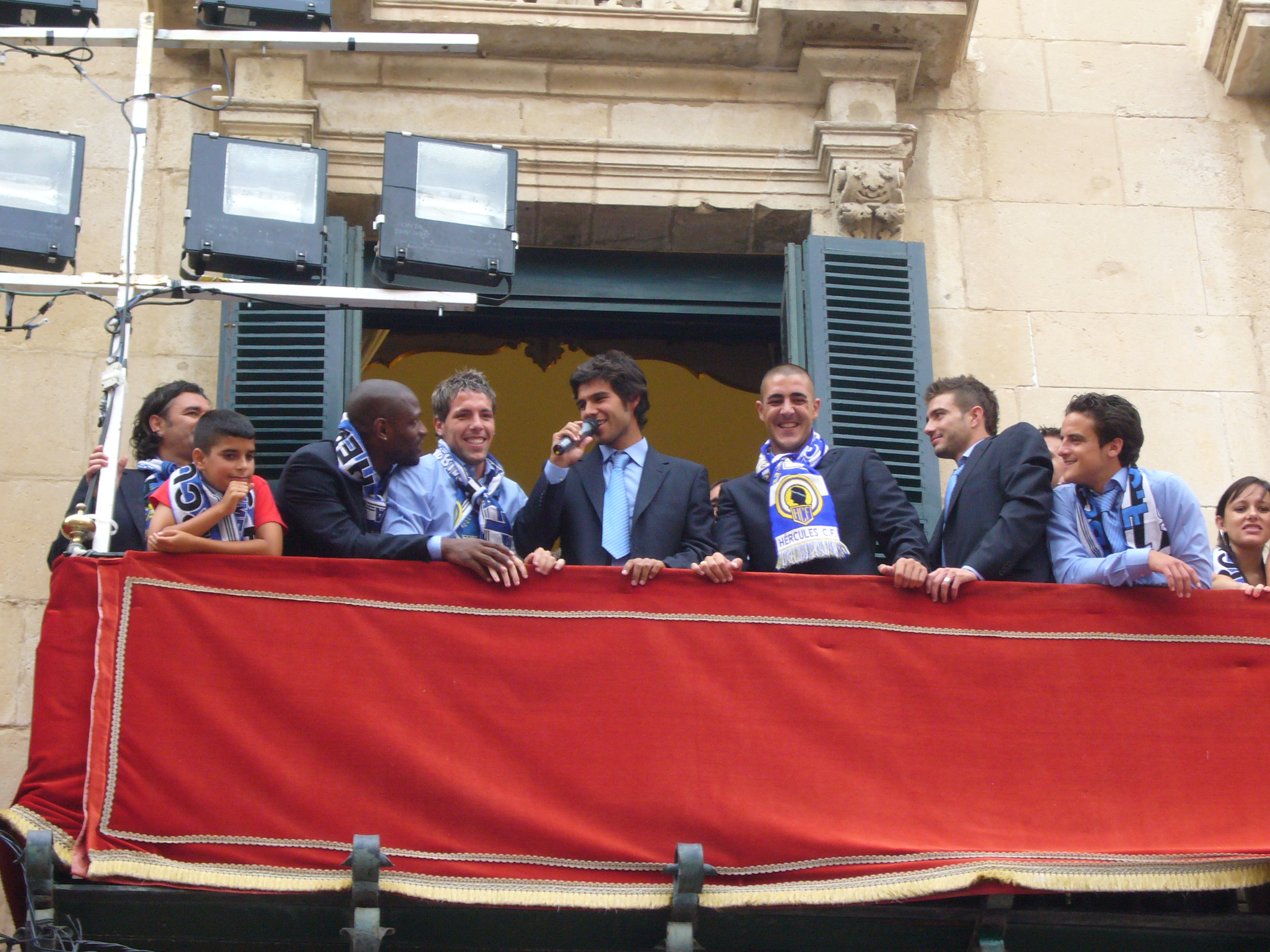
- Alonso (with the microphone) with Hércules in 2010

Personal information
- Full name: Jorge Alonso Martín
- Date of birth: 5 January 1985 (age 41)
- Place of birth: Salamanca, Spain
- Height: 1.78 m (5 ft 10 in)
- Position: Midfielder

Youth career
- Salamanca

Senior career*
Years	Team	Apps	(Gls)
2003–2005	Salamanca B		
2005–2009	Salamanca	109	(12)
2009–2010	Hércules	19	(0)
2010–2012	Valladolid	34	(5)
2012–2013	Racing Santander	14	(0)
2013	Leganés	10	(0)
2014	Bnei Sakhnin	11	(0)
2015	Guijuelo	9	(0)
2015	Atlético Kolkata	2	(0)
2016–2017	Atlético San Cristóbal	5	(6)
2018	Unionistas	16	(3)
2023–2024	Casillas	4	(0)
- * Club domestic league appearances and goals

Jorge Alonso Martín (born 5 January 1985) is a Spanish former footballer who played as a midfielder.

He amassed Segunda División totals of 144 matches and 11 goals during eight seasons, representing in the competition Salamanca, Hércules, Valladolid and Racing de Santander. He also played professionally in Israel, India and the Dominican Republic.

== Club career ==
Born in Salamanca, Castile and León, Alonso studied civil engineering at the Polytechnic School of Zamora. After Real Zaragoza expressed desire to sign him for its youth system, he eventually started playing with local UD Salamanca in 2004, appearing in only one Segunda División game in his first season, which ended in relegation; he became a regular in the following years.

Alonso joined Hércules CF on a two-year contract in June 2009, being the first player signed by the club during the off-season. In July of the following year, however, he moved to fellow league side Real Valladolid after agreeing to a three-year deal. He scored his first goal for the latter on 8 September, his 7th-minute penalty ousting SD Huesca from the Copa del Rey and helping to reach the fourth round after the 1–0 home win; the following month, he netted in the last minute to help beat RC Celta de Vigo 3–2 also at the Estadio Nuevo José Zorrilla, exciting manager Antonio Gómez.

However, with his playing time getting limited, Alonso terminated his contract in August 2012. He signed for Racing de Santander the following month.

After suffering relegation from the second level, Alonso joined Segunda División B's CD Leganés for one year. He left in December 2013, moving to the Israeli Premier League with Bnei Sakhnin FC.

In early January 2015, news circulated that third-tier club CD Guijuelo was looking to hire Alonso. He started training on the 9th, and played his first match 16 days later in a 0–1 home loss to SD Compostela.

In November 2015, Alonso joined a host of compatriots at Indian Super League franchise Atlético de Kolkata as a replacement for the injured Javi Lara. After being an unused substitute in the match against Chennaiyin FC, he made his debut in a 4–0 win over FC Goa, replacing fellow Spaniard Jaime Gavilán for the last 12 minutes.

Alonso returned to both his homeland and Salamanca in late December 2017, signing with amateurs Unionistas de Salamanca CF from the Dominican Republic's CA San Cristóbal.

== Personal life ==
Alonso's younger brother, José Ángel, was also a footballer. A defender, he too came through Salamanca's youth ranks.

== Club statistics ==
As of match played on 27 November 2015

Club	Season	League			Cup		Other		Total	
Club	Season	Division	Apps	Goals	Apps	Goals	Apps	Goals	Apps	Goals
Salamanca	2003–04	Segunda División	0	0	0	0	—		0	0
Salamanca	2004–05	Segunda División	1	0	0	0	—		1	0
Salamanca	2005–06	Segunda División B	32	6	1	0	4 (Note: Appearances in Promotion Play-offs)	1	37	7
Salamanca	2006–07	Segunda División	9	0	1	0	—		10	0
Salamanca	2007–08	Segunda División	32	5	0	0	—		32	5
Salamanca	2008–09	Segunda División	35	1	1	0	—		36	1
Salamanca	Total		109	12	3	0	4	1	116	13
Hércules	2009–10	Segunda División	19	0	5	0	—		24	0
Valladolid	2010–11	Segunda División	29	4	3	1	—		32	5
Valladolid	2011–12	Segunda División	5	1	1	0	0	0	6	1
Valladolid	Total		34	5	4	1	0	0	38	6
Racing Santander	2012–13	Segunda División	14	0	2	0	—		16	0
Leganés	2013–14	Segunda División B	10	0	2	0	—		12	0
Bnei Sakhnin	2013–14	Israeli Premier League	11	0	2	0	—		13	0
Guijuelo	2014–15	Segunda División B	9	0	0	0	—		9	0
Atlético Kolkata	2015	Indian Super League	2	0	—		—		2	0
Career total			208	17	18	1	4	1	230	19
