= Javier Torres Gómez =

Spanish football player/manager/director

Personal information
- Full name: Javier Torres Gómez
- Date of birth: 9 January 1970 (age 56)
- Place of birth: Madrid, Spain
- Height: 1.78 m (5 ft 10 in)
- Position: Right back

Youth career
- 1986–1987: Getafe
- 1987–1989: Real Madrid

Senior career*
Years	Team	Apps	(Gls)
1989–1993	Real Madrid B	117	(9)
1993–2005	Valladolid	328	(3)
Total		445	(12)

International career
1988	Spain U18	3	(0)
1988–1989	Spain U19	6	(0)
1989	Spain U20	1	(0)

Managerial career
- 2010–2011: Valladolid (assistant)
- 2010: Valladolid (interim)
- 2011–2014: Valladolid B
- 2014–2015: Villarreal C
- 2015–2016: Celta B
- * Club domestic league appearances and goals

Javier Torres Gómez (born 9 January 1970) is a Spanish former footballer who played mainly as a right back.

Most of his professional career was associated with Valladolid, as both a player and manager, coaching in several capacities and categories.

== Playing career ==
Youth years comprised, Madrid-born Torres Gómez spent six years with Real Madrid, playing four seasons with the B-team, three of them in Segunda División. He scored a career-best five goals in 38 games in 1992–93 as the reserves finished in sixth position, and started his career as a midfielder.

In summer 1993, Gómez signed for Real Valladolid, where he would remain for the rest of his career. He made his La Liga debut on 5 September in a 0–1 home loss against Sporting de Gijón, but only appeared in two matches in his first year due to a serious injury.

A regular first-team unit in the following decade, Gómez never played in less than 34 league games from 2000 to 2004, with the latter campaign ending in top-flight relegation. After one more season in the second level the 35-year-old retired from football, as the Castile and León club's second player with more top division appearances.

== Coaching career ==
In the following years, Torres Gómez continued working with Valladolid: in 2008, he was named youth system coordinator and, two years later, joined Antonio Gómez's coaching staff in the first team. On 29 November 2010, following the head coach's dismissal, he was named interim manager, leading the team in the 0–0 away draw against FC Barcelona B.

Subsequently, Gómez was appointed manager of the reserves in Tercera División, accumulating with his work in the club's cantera. On 8 July 2014, after achieving promotion via the play-offs, he moved to Villarreal CF C from Tercera División in the same capacity; subsequently, he joined Celta de Vigo B, but was sacked in February following ten games without a win and was replaced by Alejandro Menéndez.

== Managerial statistics ==
As of 30 January 2016

Managerial record by team and tenure
Team	Nat	From	To	Record							
Team	Nat	From	To	G	W	D	L	GF	GA	GD	Win %
Valladolid (interim)	(Spain)	29 November 2010	6 December 2010	1	0	1	0	0	0	+0	0.00
Valladolid B	(Spain)	6 July 2011	8 July 2014	120	75	23	22	226	106	+120	62.50
Villarreal C	(Spain)	8 July 2014	25 June 2015	40	17	11	12	60	51	+9	42.50
Celta B	(Spain)	25 June 2015	1 February 2016	23	5	6	12	25	42	−17	21.74
Total				184	97	41	46	311	199	+112	52.72
