= David Montero (footballer, born 1985) =

Spanish footballer

Personal information
- Full name: David Montero del Río
- Date of birth: 12 March 1985 (age 41)
- Place of birth: Salamanca, Spain
- Height: 1.81 m (5 ft 11 in)
- Position: Goalkeeper

Senior career*
Years	Team	Apps	(Gls)
2003–2007	Salamanca B		
2004–2006	Salamanca	3	(0)
2007–2008	Guadalajara	5	(0)
2008–2013	Guijuelo	118	(1)
2013–2014	Peñaranda		
Total		126	(1)

International career
2003	Spain U18	2	(0)
2004	Spain U19	1	(0)
- * Club domestic league appearances and goals

David Montero del Río (born 12 March 1985) is a Spanish retired professional footballer who played as a goalkeeper.

== Club career ==
Born in Salamanca, Castile and León, Montero was a youth graduate of local club UD Salamanca. His professional input with the first team, however, consisted of one Segunda División match against Elche CF on 18 June 2004 (15 minutes played, 2–1 away win) and a sole appearance in the Copa del Rey against Burgos CF in September of the following year.

In the summer of 2008, Montero signed with CD Guijuelo also from his native region, after one season with CD Guadalajara also in Segunda División B. On 9 May 2009, he scored from a goal kick to help the visiting team to a 1–1 draw at Real Unión.

On 4 March 2012, against SD Eibar, Montero appeared in his 100th league game for Guijuelo.
