= Pinilla de los Barruecos =

Coordinates: 41°55′N 3°18′W

- Municipality
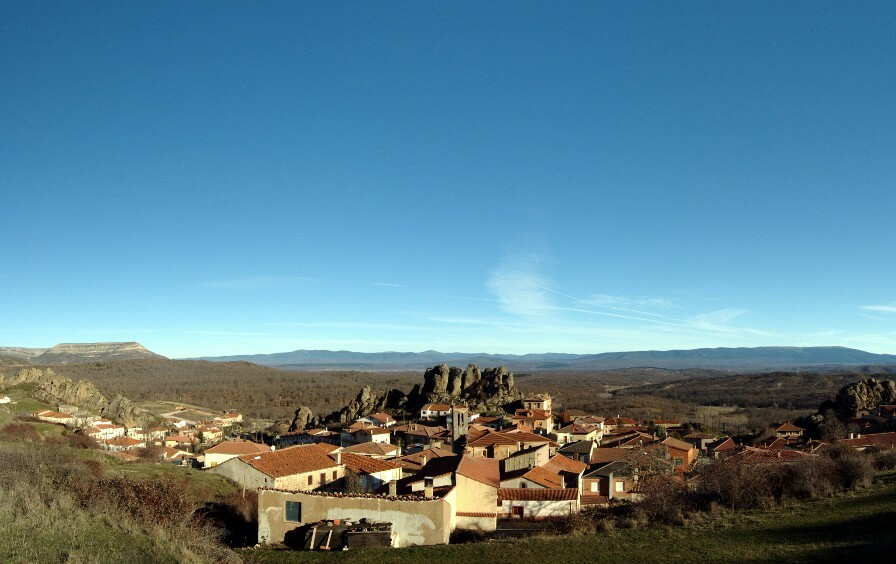
- View of Pinilla de los Barruecos, 2012

- Coat of arms
- Interactive map of Pinilla de los Barruecos
- Country: Spain
- Autonomous community: Castile and León
- Province: Burgos
- Comarca: Sierra de la Demanda

Area
  - Total: 32.521 km^{2} (12.556 sq mi)
- Elevation: 1,084 m (3,556 ft)

Population (2025-01-01)
  - Total: 100
  - Density: 3.1/km^{2} (8.0/sq mi)
- Time zone: UTC+1 (CET)
  - Summer (DST): UTC+2 (CEST)
- Postal code: 09612
- Website: http://www.pinilladelosbarruecos.es/

Pinilla de los Barruecos is a municipality and town located in the province of Burgos, Castile and León, Spain. According to the 2004 census (INE), the municipality has a population of 133 inhabitants.

== People from Pinilla de los Barruecos ==
- Álvaro Antón Camarero (born 1983), professional footballer
