= Álvaro Antón (footballer, born 1983) =

Spanish footballer

Personal information
- Full name: Álvaro Antón Camarero
- Date of birth: 28 December 1983 (age 42)
- Place of birth: Pinilla de los Barruecos, Spain
- Height: 1.79 m (5 ft 10 in)
- Position: Midfielder

Youth career
- Valladolid

Senior career*
Years	Team	Apps	(Gls)
2002–2004	Valladolid B		
2003–2011	Valladolid	99	(10)
2008	→ Racing Ferrol (loan)	21	(6)
2008–2009	→ Numancia (loan)	7	(0)
2009–2010	→ Recreativo (loan)	32	(5)
2011–2012	Cartagena	32	(4)
2012–2013	Guadalajara	41	(8)
2013–2015	Recreativo	55	(5)
2015–2016	Ponferradina	28	(3)
2016–2017	Burgos	27	(4)
2017–2021	Toledo	92	(18)
2022–2025	Torrijos	55	(3)
Total		489	(66)
- * Club domestic league appearances and goals

Álvaro Antón Camarero (born 28 December 1983) is a Spanish former professional footballer who played as a midfielder.

He played 305 Segunda División games over 11 seasons, representing six clubs and scoring 41 goals. In La Liga, he appeared for Valladolid and Numancia (a total of eight matches).

== Club career ==
Born in Pinilla de los Barruecos, Province of Burgos, Antón grew in the ranks of Real Valladolid and, after having appeared in the closing round of 2002–03's La Liga, a 1–1 away draw against Deportivo Alavés, he spent three Segunda División seasons with the main squad. In the 2006–07 campaign, he contributed 21 games and two goals (including one in a 1–0 win at Málaga CF) as the Castile and León team returned to the top division after a three-year absence.

Antón was absent throughout the first half of 2007–08, only appearing in Copa del Rey matches. He was loaned in January 2008 to Racing de Ferrol, eventually relegated to Segunda División B.

Antón was loaned again in the 2008–09 season, now to promoted CD Numancia. He played his first game for the Soria side on 31 August 2008, coming on as a second-half substitute in a 1–0 home victory over FC Barcelona. In November, during a home defeat against Real Betis, he suffered a serious anterior cruciate ligament injury, being lost for the rest of the campaign – his #21 jersey was given to new signing Carlos Aranda.

In late August 2009, Antón moved again on loan, joining Recreativo de Huelva for 2009–10's second division and experiencing his best season as a professional, scoring five goals in 2,689 minutes for the Andalusians. On 27 July 2012, after being relegated with FC Cartagena, he joined fellow second-tier club CD Guadalajara on a one-year contract, and suffered the same fate at the end of the season due to administrative issues.

Antón subsequently returned to Recreativo, and was released in June 2015 following yet another relegation from division two. On 1 August, he went back to his native region and signed with SD Ponferradina.

On 31 August 2016, following his team's relegation, the 32-year-old Antón joined Burgos CF for two years. A year later, he moved to CD Toledo also in the third tier, and remained with them after their relegation to the Tercera División in 2018.
