= Toni Sánchez =

Spanish footballer

Toni
Personal information
- Full name: Antonio Sánchez Cabeza
- Date of birth: 7 February 1985 (age 41)
- Place of birth: Barcelona, Spain
- Height: 1.72 m (5 ft 8 in)
- Position: Left back

Youth career
- Betis

Senior career*
Years	Team	Apps	(Gls)
2004–2011	Betis B	155	(18)
2004–2005	→ Antoniano (loan)		
2008	Betis	1	(0)
2010–2011	→ Albacete (loan)	21	(1)
2011	Huesca	11	(0)
2012–2016	Cacereño	121	(8)
2016–2017	Toledo	26	(0)
2017	Mérida	0	(0)
2017–2018	Gerena	37	(2)
2018–2020	Utrera	50	(5)
- * Club domestic league appearances and goals

Antonio Sánchez Cabeza (born 7 February 1985), known as Toni, is a Spanish former professional footballer who played as a left back.

He played one La Liga match for Betis and 32 in Segunda División for Albacete and Huesca, but spent most of his career in Segunda División B, where he totalled 236 appearances with three clubs, mostly Cacereño.

== Club career ==
Born in Barcelona, Catalonia, Toni spent his youth in Real Betis and played for the reserves in three Segunda División B seasons. He made his first-team debut on 2 January 2008 in the last 16 of the Copa del Rey, playing the full 90 minutes of a 3–0 home win over Elche CF. Four days later he made his only La Liga appearance in a loss by the same score away to Sevilla FC in the Seville derby, as a 27th-minute substitute for the injured David Rivas. On 9 January, in his only other appearance for the Blanquiverdes, he was withdrawn at half time in a 2–1 home defeat to Valencia CF in the next round of the cup.

In July 2010, Toni was loaned to Segunda División club Albacete Balompié for the season. He scored a first professional goal on 18 December, the game's only at CD Numancia, while the side from Castilla–La Mancha ended the campaign relegated after finishing in last place. In August 2011, he signed a permanent deal with SD Huesca in the same level.

Toni was released by Huesca in January 2012 and was unemployed until August, when he signed for third-tier CP Cacereño. After their relegation in 2016, he stayed in the league by signing for CD Toledo in July.

In the following years, Toni plied his trade in the Tercera División for Mérida AD, CD Gerena and CD Utrera.
