= José Antonio Salcedo (footballer) =

Spanish footballer (born 1990)

Personal information
- Full name: José Antonio Salcedo Sánchez
- Date of birth: 1 October 1990 (age 36)
- Place of birth: Valdeganga, Spain
- Height: 1.85 m (6 ft 1 in)
- Position: Goalkeeper

Team information
- Current team: Águilas
- Number: 13

Youth career
- Albacete

Senior career*
Years	Team	Apps	(Gls)
2009–2010	Mouscron	5	(0)
2010–2012	Valladolid B	21	(0)
2011–2012	Valladolid	1	(0)
2012–2013	Huracán	1	(0)
2013–2015	La Roda	31	(0)
2015–2016	La Hoya Lorca	35	(0)
2016–2017	Mérida	22	(0)
2017	Guadalajara	14	(1)
2017–2019	Rayo Majadahonda	3	(0)
2019–2020	Villarrobledo	26	(0)
2021	Guijuelo	16	(0)
2021–2022	Salamanca	17	(0)
2022–2024	Melilla	51	(0)
2024–2025	La Unión Atlético	34	(0)
2025–	Águilas	4	(0)
- * Club domestic league appearances and goals as of 28 September 2025

José Antonio Salcedo Sánchez (born 1 October 1990) is a Spanish footballer who plays for Segunda Federación club Águilas as a goalkeeper.

== Club career ==
Born in Valdeganga, Albacete, Castile-La Mancha, Salcedo finished his formation with Albacete Balompié, but moved abroad in the 2009 summer after signing with Belgian Pro League club R.E. Mouscron. On 1 August 2009, he made his professional debut, starting in a 2–1 away win over K.R.C. Genk, but left in December due to unpaid wages.

On 27 January 2010, free agent Salcedo returned to Spain, joining Real Valladolid B. On 29 January of the following year, he first appeared with the first team, playing the last 24 minutes in a 0–2 away loss against Villarreal CF B after Javi Jiménez was sent off.

On 31 July 2012, Salcedo moved to Huracán Valencia CF, in Segunda División B. However, he only appeared once in the league in the entire season, and subsequently joined fellow league side La Roda CF.

Salcedo subsequently resumed his career in the lower leagues, representing La Hoya Lorca CF, Mérida AD, CD Guadalajara, CF Rayo Majadahonda and CP Villarrobledo. With Guadalajara, he scored a last-minute equalizer in a 1–1 away draw against UD Almansa through a header, and also achieved promotion to the second division with the Majariegos in 2018.
