= Javi Navas =

Spanish footballer

Personal information
- Full name: Javier Fernández Herranz
- Date of birth: 2 June 1991 (age 35)
- Place of birth: Las Navas del Marqués, Spain
- Height: 1.82 m (6 ft 0 in)
- Position: Winger

Team information
- Current team: Unión Adarve

Youth career
- 2006–2010: Valladolid

Senior career*
Years	Team	Apps	(Gls)
2009–2013	Valladolid B	85	(16)
2010–2011	Valladolid	1	(0)
2013	Osasuna B	14	(0)
2013–2014	Getafe B	13	(1)
2014–2015	Valladolid B	34	(5)
2015–2016	Cultural Leonesa	33	(2)
2016–2017	SS Reyes	14	(1)
2017	Izarra	12	(0)
2017–2020	Unionistas	83	(2)
2021	Salamanca	15	(1)
2021–2022	Zamora	32	(0)
2022	Xerez Deportivo	7	(0)
2023–2025	Salamanca	60	(9)
2025–	Unión Adarve	9	(0)
- * Club domestic league appearances and goals as of 9 November 2025

Javier Fernández Herranz (born 2 June 1991), known as Javi Navas, is a Spanish professional footballer who plays as a winger for Tercera Federación club Unión Adarve.

== Club career ==
Born in Las Navas del Marqués, Province of Ávila, Navas finished his development at Real Valladolid. He made his senior debut with the reserves in the 2008–09 season, suffering relegation from Segunda División B.

Navas made his official debut with the Castile and León club's main squad on 8 September 2010, starting in a 1–0 home win against SD Huesca in the third round of the Copa del Rey. His first match in Segunda División came on 11 December of the following year when he came on as a second-half substitute in the 2–2 draw at Hércules CF. He was definitely promoted to the first team at the end of the campaign, being however deemed surplus to requirements by the same manager, Miroslav Đukić, and returning to the B side.

In September 2012, Navas agreed to a new two-year contract with Valladolid B. On 3 January of the following year, however, he left the Estadio José Zorrilla, signing for two years with CA Osasuna B in the third division.

On 7 July 2014, Navas rejoined his first senior team Valladolid B, now in the third tier of Spanish football. He continued competing in that league the following seasons, with Cultural y Deportiva Leonesa, UD San Sebastián de los Reyes, CD Izarra, Unionistas de Salamanca CF, Salamanca CF UDS and Zamora CF.
