= Javi Jiménez (footballer, born 1987) =

Spanish footballer (born 1987)

Personal information
- Full name: Javier Jiménez Camarero
- Date of birth: 8 June 1987 (age 39)
- Place of birth: Logroño, Spain
- Height: 1.83 m (6 ft 0 in)
- Position: Goalkeeper

Youth career
- Alavés

Senior career*
Years	Team	Apps	(Gls)
2006–2008	Alavés B		
2008–2011	Valladolid B	77	(0)
2011	Valladolid	17	(0)
2011–2013	Murcia	49	(0)
2013–2015	Levante	2	(0)
2014–2015	→ Alcorcón (loan)	22	(0)
2015–2016	Elche	40	(0)
2016–2017	Huesca	0	(0)
2017	Tromsø	0	(0)
2018	UCAM Murcia	15	(0)
2019	Sanluqueño	18	(0)
2020	Algeciras	6	(0)
2020–2021	Salamanca	4	(0)
2022	Surkhon	2	(0)
2023	Compostela	8	(0)
2023–2024	Ibiza Islas Pitiusas	11	(0)
2024–2025	Logroñés	5	(0)
- * Club domestic league appearances and goals as of 23:52, 19 June 2025 (UTC)

Javier 'Javi' Jiménez Camarero (born 8 June 1987) is a Spanish professional footballer who plays as a goalkeeper.

== Club career ==
Born in Logroño, La Rioja, Jiménez joined Real Valladolid in 2008 from Deportivo Alavés. During three seasons, he played for the Castile and León side's reserves in both the Segunda División B and the Tercera División.

Jiménez started training regularly with the first team in 2010–11. On 29 January 2011 he made his Segunda División debut, being sent off in a 2–0 away loss against Villarreal CF B. He finished the campaign as first choice, and appeared in the promotion playoffs against Elche CF in an eventual 3–2 aggregate defeat.

After two seasons in the second division with Real Murcia CF, appearing in 40 games in his second to suffer relegation but later reinstatement, Jiménez moved to La Liga in the summer of 2013 by signing with Levante UD for three years. He made his first appearance in the competition on 24 November, replacing field player Jordi Xumetra in the early stages of an eventual 0–3 home loss to Villarreal CF after Keylor Navas was sent off.

On 1 September 2014, Jiménez was loaned to second-tier club AD Alcorcón in a season-long deal. On 19 August of the following year, he terminated his contract at the Estadi Ciutat de València and joined Elche CF hours later.

Jiménez signed a two-year deal with SD Huesca also in division two on 5 July 2016. On 26 July of the following year, after spending the campaign nursing a knee injury, he terminated his contract.

Brief spells in Norway with Tromsø IL and Uzbekistan with FC Surkhon notwithstanding, Jiménez competed in the Spanish lower leagues until his retirement.

== Personal life ==
Jiménez's twin brother, Diego, was also a footballer. He spent his entire career in the lower and amateur divisions.

== Career statistics ==
As of match played 24 November 2024

Appearances and goals by club, season and competition
Club	Season	League			National Cup		Europe		Other		Total	
Club	Season	Division	Apps	Goals	Apps	Goals	Apps	Goals	Apps	Goals	Apps	Goals
Valladolid	2010–11	Segunda División	17	0	0	0	—		2	0	19	0
Murcia	2011–12	Segunda División	9	0	1	0	—		—		10	0
Murcia	2012–13	Segunda División	40	0	0	0	—		—		40	0
Murcia	Total		49	0	1	0	—		—		50	0
Levante	2013–14	La Liga	2	0	4	0	—		—		6	0
Alcorcón (loan)	2014–15	Segunda División	22	0	1	0	—		—		23	0
Elche	2015–16	Segunda División	40	0	0	0	—		—		40	0
Huesca	2016–17	Segunda División	0	0	0	0	—		0	0	0	0
Tromsø	2017	Eliteserien	0	0	—		—		—		0	0
UCAM Murcia	2017–18	Segunda División B	15	0	—		—		—		15	0
Sanluqueño	2018–19	Segunda División B	18	0	—		—		—		18	0
Algeciras	2019–20	Segunda División B	6	0	—		—		—		6	0
Salamanca	2020–21	Segunda División B	4	0	—		—		1	0	5	0
Surkhon	2022	Uzbekistan Super League	2	0	0	0	—		—		2	0
Compostela	2022–23	Segunda Federación	8	0	—		—		0	0	8	0
Ibiza Islas Pitiusas	2023–24	Tercera Federación	11	0	—		—		0	0	11	0
Logroñés	2024–25	Segunda Federación	5	0	—		—		0	0	5	0
Career total			199	0	6	0	0	0	3	0	208	0
