= Pablo Sicilia =

Spanish footballer

Personal information
- Full name: Pablo Sicilia Roig
- Date of birth: 10 September 1981 (age 45)
- Place of birth: Las Palmas, Spain
- Height: 1.82 m (5 ft 11 1/2 in)
- Position: Centre-back

Youth career
- Las Palmas

Senior career*
Years	Team	Apps	(Gls)
2001–2003	Las Palmas B		
2001	→ Universidad LP (loan)	4	(0)
2003–2004	Vecindario	36	(2)
2004–2006	Atlético Madrid B	58	(2)
2006	Atlético Madrid	1	(0)
2006–2012	Tenerife	186	(13)
Total		285	(17)
- * Club domestic league appearances and goals

Pablo Sicilia Roig (born 10 September 1981) is a Spanish former professional footballer who played as a central defender.

He spent most of his 11-year senior career with Tenerife, appearing in 197 competitive games over six seasons, one in La Liga.

== Club career ==
Sicilia was born in Las Palmas, Canary Islands. After starting professionally with local UD Vecindario, he joined Atlético Madrid for the 2004–05 season, but was mainly registered with the reserves. On 19 February 2006 he made his sole appearance with the first team, playing one minute in a 3–0 away win against neighbours Getafe CF.

In the 2006–07 campaign, Sicilia signed for CD Tenerife in the Segunda División, being an early first choice. In his third year, he contributed 36 games (2,843 minutes) as the club returned to La Liga after a seven-year absence.

From 2009 to 2012, Sicilia played a further 80 league matches and scored eight goals, but Tenerife suffered two consecutive relegations in the process. He retired subsequently, aged 30.
