= 2011 Segunda División play-offs =

Segunda División play-offs
- Season: 2010–11
- Promoted: Granada
- Matches: 6
- Goals: 9 (1.5 per match)

The 2011 Segunda División play-offs took place in June 2011. This was Segunda's first season with purely promotion play-offs since 1986–87 and the first time playoffs had been used for movement between the first and second tier since 1998–99. This new promotion phase (known as Promoción de ascenso) was introduced to determine the third team which promoted to 2011–12 La Liga. Teams placed between 3rd and 6th position, excluding reserve teams, took part in the promotion play-offs.

Fifth placed faced against the fourth, while the sixth positioned team faced against the third. In case of a tied eliminatory there were extra time, once finished it, penalty shoot-out determined the winner. The first leg of the semifinals were played on 12 June, and the second leg on 15 June at home of the best positioned team. The first leg of the semifinals was played on 8–9 June 2011 with the best positioned team playing at home on the second leg which was played on 11–12 June 2011. The final was also two-legged, with the first leg on 15 June 2011 and the second leg on 18 June 2011 with the best positioned team also playing at home on the second leg. Elche CF and Granada CF played the final phase where Granada CF promoted to La Liga for the first time in 35 years, having spent 26 of them in Segunda División B and Tercera División. Celta de Vigo and Real Valladolid were eliminated in semifinals. Barcelona B could not participate in the play-offs as they are Barcelona's reserve team.

== Road to the Promotions play-offs ==
=== League table ===
Pos	Team	Pld	W	D	L	GF	GA	GD	Pts	Qualification
3	Barcelona B	42	20	11	11	85	62	+23	71 (Note: Barcelona B could not participate in the play-offs as they are Barcelona's reserve team, so the seventh positioned team qualified for the play-offs.)	
4	Elche	42	18	15	9	55	42	+13	69	Promotion play-offs
5	Granada	42	18	14	10	71	47	+24	68	Promotion play-offs
6	Celta de Vigo	42	17	16	9	62	43	+19	67	Promotion play-offs
7	Valladolid	42	19	9	14	65	51	+14	66	Promotion play-offs

Source: LFP - Liga Adelante
Rules for classification: 1st points; 2nd head-to-head points; 3rd head-to-head goal difference; 4th head-to-head goals scored; 5th goal difference; 6th number of goals scored; 7th Fair-play points

=== Elche CF ===
Elche CF was the second team together with Celta de Vigo to be qualified to this phase after the win of Rayo Vallecano by 3–0 against Xerez CD on 22 May 2011. Elche at the time was the Segunda División team with most consecutive seasons. They made a regular season until 1 March, when this spring the team started to get into a run: 10 wins, 4 draws and 2 defeats, 34 points out of 48. Finally the team ended in 4th place after Granada CF's draw and their victory 4–1 in the last game against Xerez CD (a team which still had options to qualify if Real Valladolid lost their game with AD Alcorcón), so being the best positioned they played the second legs at home. Elche's last participation in La Liga was in 1988–89, having spent 19 seasons: from 1959 until 1978 except a hiatus in 1971–73 and briefly in 1984–85 and 1988–89. Elche was 23rd in the All-Time La Liga table. They were in Segunda División since the 1999–2000 season.

Background at 2010–11 Segunda División:

Round	01	02	03	04	05	06	07	08	09	10	11	12	13	14	15	16	17	18	19	20	21	22	23	24	25	26	27	28	29	30	31	32	33	34	35	36	37	38	39	40	41	42
Position	8	5	10	13	12	15	11	11	10	11	12	10	13	13	9	7	7	8	10	10	10	10	12	12	10	13	9	7	6	5	5	6	5	5	5	6	6	4	3	5	5	4
Result	W	W	L	L	D	L	W	D	W	L	D	D	D	D	W	W	D	D	L	D	D	D	L	W	W	L	W	W	W	W	W	L	W	D	W	L	W	W	D	D	D	W

=== Granada CF ===
Granada CF was the first team to be qualified to this phase after winning against Villarreal B 3–0 in Los Cármenes on 20 May 2011. Granada, a team which was promoted from the Segunda División B previous season after being 22 years in lower levels, made a spectacular season in the regular league having made a brilliant second round where most of the last matchdays was the best positioned team for the play-offs places. Finally the team ended up in 5th position after drawing 0–0 in the last game against Recreativo de Huelva. Granada's last participation in La Liga was in 1975–76, having spent 17 seasons: 1941–45, 1957–61, 1966–67 and the largest period in 1968–1976. Granada was 26th in the All-Time La Liga table. This was their first season in Segunda División for 22 years.

Background at 2010–11 Segunda División:

Round	01	02	03	04	05	06	07	08	09	10	11	12	13	14	15	16	17	18	19	20	21	22	23	24	25	26	27	28	29	30	31	32	33	34	35	36	37	38	39	40	41	42
Position	20	22	21	17	16	14	10	10	12	8	9	7	8	10	11	9	8	7	8	7	6	5	5	4	4	4	4	4	5	6	7	5	6	6	6	5	5	3	4	3	4	5
Result	L	L	L	W	D	W	W	D	D	W	L	W	L	D	D	W	D	W	L	D	W	W	W	W	D	W	L	L	D	D	D	W	L	W	D	W	W	W	L	W	D	D

=== Celta de Vigo ===
Celta de Vigo was the second team together with Elche CF to be qualified to this phase thanks to a 2–2 draw against Elche on 21 May 2011 and after the win of Rayo Vallecano by 3–0 against Xerez CD the next day. Celta de Vigo is a historical La Liga team which was known as "EuroCelta" about ten years ago thanks to their achievements in European competitions: 7–0 over S.L. Benfica, 4–0 over Juventus FC, one good participation in the UEFA Champions League winning in San Siro over A.C. Milan, and in 2006–07 at UEFA Cup reaching round of 16, however that season the team was relegated from La Liga to Segunda División and fell into a crisis. They made a very good 2010–11 Segunda División season fighting between Real Betis and Rayo Vallecano for the direct promotion, being 1st or 2nd some matchdays and by 28 February they had only lost two matches. But as opposed to what happened with Elche CF, results since March were ominous for Celta: 2 wins, 7 draws and 7 defeats, 13 points out of 48. Thanks to the previous good results, some draws and the win over Albacete Balompié they remained in play-off places. Finally the team ended up in 6th position after winning 3–0 in the last game against FC Cartagena. Celta's last participation in La Liga was in 2006–07, having spent 46 seasons: from 1939 to 1959 except 1944–45, 1969–75, briefly in 1976–77, 1978–79, 1982–83 and 1985–86, 1987–90 and a golden era between 1992 and 2007 except the 2004–05 season. Celta de Vigo was 12th in the All-Time La Liga table. They were in Segunda División since their relegation from La Liga in 2007.

Background at 2010–11 Segunda División:

Round	01	02	03	04	05	06	07	08	09	10	11	12	13	14	15	16	17	18	19	20	21	22	23	24	25	26	27	28	29	30	31	32	33	34	35	36	37	38	39	40	41	42
Position	17	10	7	6	3	2	1	2	2	2	3	3	3	3	3	3	3	2	2	2	2	3	2	2	1	1	1	2	3	3	3	3	4	3	3	3	4	6	5	6	6	6
Result	L	W	W	W	W	W	W	D	D	D	D	L	W	D	W	D	W	W	W	D	W	D	W	D	W	W	L	L	L	D	L	D	L	W	D	D	L	D	D	D	L	W

=== Real Valladolid ===
Real Valladolid was the last team to qualify to this phase, they did so in the last game by winning 2–0 against AD Alcorcón on 4 June 2011. Real Valladolid, a historical La Liga team, they were relegated from La Liga last season, in the last match Valladolid was a FC Barcelona victim, a match that Barça needed a win to get the league championship. They made an irregular 2010–11 Segunda División season: in the early 12 matchdays they played good and were in play-off places, however they began a losing streak which almost touched the relegation zone, but since matchday 24 they started to escalate positions again. They lost the penultimate match against SD Huesca (when a point was enough to qualify) and their play-off position was in danger if they lost and Xerez defeated Elche, but they won the last game. Valladolid's last participation in La Liga was in 2009–10, having spent 40 seasons: from 1948 to 1964 except 1958–59 and 1961–62, 1980–2004 except 1992–93 season and lately 2007–2010. Valladolid was 13th in the All-Time La Liga table. They were in Segunda División only since this season.

Background at 2010–11 Segunda División:

Round	01	02	03	04	05	06	07	08	09	10	11	12	13	14	15	16	17	18	19	20	21	22	23	24	25	26	27	28	29	30	31	32	33	34	35	36	37	38	39	40	41	42
Position	3	2	1	5	7	8	7	6	7	5	6	5	6	7	6	10	11	12	12	11	12	15	16	14	14	12	12	11	13	11	9	9	7	7	7	7	7	7	7	7	7	7
Result	W	W	W	L	D	D	D	W	L	W	L	W	L	L	D	L	L	D	L	W	L	L	L	W	W	W	D	W	L	W	W	D	W	W	D	W	D	W	L	W	L	W

== Promotion play-offs ==
Semifinals
6	Celta de Vigo	1	0	1 (4)
5	Granada (aet)	0	1	1 (5) (p)
7	Valladolid	1	1	2
4	Elche	0	3	3

Final
5	Granada (a)	0	1	1
4	Elche	0	1	1

=== Semifinals ===
Team 1	Agg.	Team 2	1st leg	2nd leg
Celta de Vigo	1–1 (4–5 p)	Granada	1–0	0–1 (a.e.t.)
Valladolid	2–3	Elche	1–0	1–3

==== First leg ====
8 June 2011
21:00 CEST

Celta de Vigo	1 – 0	Granada
Michu 78'	(Report); Live TV: Gol T/C+ Liga

Balaídos, Vigo
Attendance: 22,000
Referee: Carlos del Cerro Grande

9 June 2011
21:00 CEST

Valladolid	1 – 0	Elche
Guerra 59'	(Report); Live TV: Canal+

José Zorrilla, Valladolid
Attendance: 25,000
Referee: Pedro Jesús Pérez Montero

==== Second leg ====
11 June 2011
21:00 CEST

Granada	1 – 0 (a.e.t.) (1 – 1 agg.)	Celta de Vigo
Orellana 21'	(Report); Live TV: Gol T/C+ Liga
Penalties
Orellana (penalty scored); Calvo (penalty missed); Gómez (penalty scored); Benítez (penalty scored); Pérez (penalty scored); Roberto (penalty scored)	5 – 4	(penalty scored) Trashorras; (penalty scored) López; (penalty scored) Aspas; (penalty scored) de Lucas; (penalty missed) Michu; (penalty missed) Catalá

Los Cármenes, Granada
Attendance: 16,000
Referee: José Luis Lesma López

12 June 2011
21:00 CEST

Elche	3 – 1 (3 – 2 agg.)	Valladolid
Albácar 44', 45'; Ángel 57'	(Report); Live TV: Canal+	22' Óscar

Martínez Valero, Elche
Attendance: 25,000
Referee: Julio Amoedo Chas

=== Final ===
Team 1	Agg.	Team 2	1st leg	2nd leg
Granada	1–1 (a)	Elche	0–0	1–1

==== First leg ====
15 June 2011
21:00 CEST

Granada	0 – 0	Elche
	(Report); Live TV: Gol T/C+ Liga /Canal+

Nuevo Los Cármenes, Granada
Attendance: 16,000
Referee: Alfonso Pino Zamorano

==== Second leg ====
18 June 2011
21:00 CEST

Elche	1 – 1 (1 – 1a agg.)	Granada
Xumetra 82'	(Report); Live TV: Gol T/C+ Liga /Canal+	28' Ighalo

Martínez Valero, Elche
Attendance: 36,000
Referee: David Miranda Torres

Promoted to La Liga
Granada
(35 years later)
