= José Antonio Culebras =

Spanish footballer

Personal information
- Full name: José Antonio Culebras Arenas
- Date of birth: 16 January 1979 (age 47)
- Place of birth: Puertollano, Spain
- Height: 1.87 m (6 ft 2 in)
- Position: Centre-back

Senior career*
| Years | Team | Apps | (Gls) |
| 1998–1999 | Toledo B | | |
| 1999–2000 | Toledo | 28 | (1) |
| 2000–2004 | Numancia | 93 | (5) |
| 2004–2006 | Levante | 54 | (1) |
| 2006–2010 | Tenerife | 98 | (5) |
| 2010–2012 | Numancia | 24 | (1) |
| 2012–2019 | Almazán | 119 | (14) |
| 2019–2022 | Tardelcuende | 26 | (4) |
| Total | | 442 | (31) |
- * Club domestic league appearances and goals

José Antonio Culebras Arenas (born 16 January 1979) is a Spanish former professional footballer who played as a central defender.

== Club career ==
Culebras was born in Puertollano, Province of Ciudad Real. In his professional career, spent mainly in the Segunda División, he played for CD Toledo, CD Numancia, Levante UD and CD Tenerife, being relegated from La Liga with all the clubs except the first, with which he competed in the second division in the 1999–2000 campaign (also suffering relegation).

On 13 May 2001, Culebras made his debut in the Spanish top flight, playing the full 90 minutes for Numancia in a 1–0 home win against CA Osasuna. He amassed second-tier totals of 247 matches and 11 goals over ten seasons.

Culebras retired in 2022 aged 43, following amateur spells with SD Almazán and SD Tardelcuende.
