= Tariq Spezie =

Footballer (born 1980)

Tariq
Personal information
- Full name: Tariq Spezie Sevilla
- Date of birth: 21 June 1980 (age 46)
- Place of birth: Sharjah, United Arab Emirates
- Height: 1.83 m (6 ft 0 in)
- Position: Striker

Youth career
- Racing Blanenc
- Vilobí

Senior career*
Years	Team	Apps	(Gls)
1999–2001	Valladolid B	54	(22)
2001–2002	Espanyol B	29	(6)
2002–2003	Cacereño	34	(7)
2003–2004	Linares	20	(3)
2004	Palencia	11	(3)
2004–2005	Sabadell	36	(6)
2005–2008	Águilas	99	(26)
2008–2009	Puertollano	36	(24)
2009–2011	Granada	42	(19)
2011	→ Huesca (loan)	18	(8)
2011–2014	Huesca	89	(16)
2014–2015	Huracán	47	(10)
2016	Castellón	14	(8)
Total		529	(158)
- * Club domestic league appearances and goals

Tariq Spezie Sevilla (born 21 June 1980), known simply as Tariq, is a Spanish former professional footballer who played as a striker.

He played 87 games and scored 21 goals in the Segunda División for Granada and Huesca, but spent the vast majority of his career in the Segunda División B, where he recorded figures of 407 matches and 111 goals in service of 11 teams.

== Early years ==
Tariq was born in Sharjah, United Arab Emirates to an Italian father and a Spanish mother, receiving his name from the former – who was working in the country – in honour of Tariq ibn Ziyad. As the political situation in the region worsened, eventually leading to the Iran–Iraq War, the family relocated to Italy with their one-year infant, and later to Spain.

== Club career ==
Tariq played youth football in modest clubs in Catalonia, making his senior debut with Real Valladolid Promesas and competing one season apiece in the Segunda División B and the Tercera División there. Another reserve team followed in the 2001–02 campaign, as he helped RCD Espanyol B to finish second in the third division, without playoff promotion however.

Tariq spent the following eight and a half years in division three in representation of seven sides, mainly Águilas CF. In 2008–09 he scored a career-best 24 goals – topping the league– for UD Puertollano, adding 19 for Granada CF in the following year en route to his first Segunda División promotion.

On 25 January 2011, Tariq was loaned to SD Huesca – also in the second tier – until the end of the season, via Udinese Calcio. In less than half of the matches, he scored eight goals (second-best in the squad behind Juanjo Camacho) as the Aragonese club finally retained its league status; he moved on a permanent basis ahead of the following campaign.

Tariq joined fellow third-tier Huracán Valencia CF on 2 July 2014. Following their disqualification for financial issues, he dropped down a league to sign for neighbouring CD Castellón on 18 January 2016.

== Honours ==
Granada

- Segunda División B: 2009–10

Individual

- Segunda División B top scorer: 2008–09
