= Fábio Faria (footballer) =

Portuguese footballer

Personal information
- Full name: Fábio do Passo Faria
- Date of birth: 24 April 1989 (age 37)
- Place of birth: Vila do Conde, Portugal
- Height: 1.86 m (6 ft 1 in)
- Position: Centre-back

Youth career
- 2002–2005: Porto
- 2004–2005: → Padroense (loan)
- 2005–2007: Rio Ave

Senior career*
Years	Team	Apps	(Gls)
2007–2010	Rio Ave	29	(1)
2010–2013	Benfica	0	(0)
2011	→ Valladolid (loan)	4	(0)
2011–2012	→ Paços Ferreira (loan)	7	(0)
2012	→ Rio Ave (loan)	0	(0)
Total		40	(1)

International career
2007–2008	Portugal U19	4	(0)
2009–2010	Portugal U21	10	(0)
- * Club domestic league appearances and goals

Fábio do Passo Faria (born 24 April 1989) is a Portuguese former professional footballer who played as a central defender.

== Club career ==
Born in Vila do Conde, Faria finished his development at his hometown club Rio Ave FC, having arrived aged 16 from FC Porto. In 2007, with the side in the Segunda Liga, he was promoted to the first team, appearing in two games as they returned to the Primeira Liga.

After almost no competitive appearances in the 2008–09 season, Faria became an undisputed starter the following campaign – 27 matches, one goal, partnering veteran Gaspar as the team retained their league status – and was also called up to the Portugal under-21s for the first time. In December 2009, his solid performances earned him a transfer to S.L. Benfica on a four-year contract for an estimated fee of €2 million, effective for 2010–11.

Faria only featured once during his spell at the Estádio da Luz, 45 minutes in a 2–0 home win against C.S. Marítimo in the group stage of the Taça da Liga where he played as a left-back. In January 2011, he was loaned to Real Valladolid of the Spanish Segunda División until June.

Still owned by Benfica, Faria split the 2011–12 season with F.C. Paços de Ferreira and former club Rio Ave. With the latter, after a game against Moreirense F.C. in the League Cup, he felt indisposed and had to be taken to hospital with a heart condition, which put his career on hold for several months; his retirement was completed in March 2013, at the age of only 23.

== Personal life ==
Faria's father, Francisco (born 22 October 1964), was also a footballer. A striker, he also started his career at Rio Ave, and went on to play professionally for 13 years in representation of seven teams (notably C.F. Os Belenenses), amassing top-division totals of 199 games and 62 goals.

== Honours ==
Benfica

- Taça da Liga: 2010–11
