= Javier Baraja =

Spanish footballer (born 1980)

Personal information
- Full name: Javier Baraja Vegas
- Date of birth: 24 August 1980 (age 46)
- Place of birth: Valladolid, Spain
- Height: 1.79 m (5 ft 10 in)
- Positions: Defensive midfielder; centre-back

Team information
- Current team: Valladolid B (manager)

Youth career
- Valladolid

Senior career*
| Years | Team | Apps | (Gls) |
| 1999–2002 | Valladolid B | | |
| 2001–2002 | Valladolid | 2 | (0) |
| 2002–2004 | Getafe | 27 | (0) |
| 2004–2005 | Málaga B | 35 | (1) |
| 2005–2014 | Valladolid | 197 | (4) |
| Total | | 261+ | (5+) |

International career
| 1997 | Spain U16 | 7 | (0) |
| 1998 | Spain U17 | 3 | (0) |

Managerial career
- 2015–2016: Valladolid (assistant)
- 2016–2017: Rayo Vallecano (assistant)
- 2018–2019: Valladolid (youth)
- 2019–2021: Valladolid B
- 2022: Ibiza
- 2025: Getafe B
- 2025–: Valladolid B
Medal record
Men's football
Representing Spain
UEFA European Under-16 Championship
| Winner | 1997 Germany |
- * Club domestic league appearances and goals

Javier Baraja Vegas (born 24 August 1980) is a Spanish former professional footballer who played as a defensive midfielder or a central defender. He is currently manager of Segunda Federación club Valladolid B.

He spent most of his 15-year career with Valladolid, appearing in 229 competitive games and playing six La Liga seasons with the club (ten in total).

== Playing career ==
Born in Valladolid, Castile and León, and a product of hometown Real Valladolid's youth system, Baraja's first appearance in La Liga was on 26 August 2001 as he played 17 minutes in a 4–0 away loss against Deportivo de La Coruña. He only featured in one more match in that first season, totalling 107 minutes of action.

After stints in the Segunda División, appearing scarcely for Getafe in two years (he played 13 games in his second year as the Madrid side achieved a first-ever promotion to the top division) and spending one season with Málaga's reserves, Baraja returned to Valladolid in 2005–06. He played 28 times as the club returned to the top flight the following campaign.

Relatively used during the 2007–08 and 2008–09 seasons, Baraja scored his first goal for Valladolid on 13 September 2008, netting a penalty in a 2–1 home win over Atlético Madrid. He experienced a further two top-tier relegations with them until his retirement at the age of 34, adding one promotion in 2012 and often acting as team captain.

== Coaching career ==
On 23 May 2019, Baraja was appointed the new manager of Valladolid's reserves in the Segunda División B, replacing Miguel Rivera who had stepped down two days earlier. He resigned from his position in June 2021, with 23 wins and 17 draws from 53 matches and a playoff appearance in his first season.

Baraja signed with Segunda División club Ibiza on 8 June 2022. He was dismissed on 22 October, after only three victories in 12 games.

On 18 March 2025, after nearly three years of inactivity, Baraja took over Getafe's B team in the Segunda Federación. He left on 29 May, following elimination in the promotion play-offs.

Baraja returned to Valladolid B on 10 July 2025.

== Personal life ==
Baraja's older brother, Rubén, was also a footballer and manager. The midfielder was also developed at Valladolid but played mainly for Valencia whom he also coached, and collected over 40 caps for Spain.

== Managerial statistics ==
As of 22 October 2022

Managerial record by team and tenure
| Team | Nat | From | To | Record | | | | | | | | Ref |
| Team | Nat | From | To | G | W | D | L | GF | GA | GD | Win % | Ref |
|---|---|---|---|---|---|---|---|---|---|---|---|---|
| Valladolid B | (Spain) | 23 May 2019 | 29 June 2021 | 53 | 23 | 17 | 13 | 77 | 61 | +16 | 43.40 | |
| Ibiza | (Spain) | 8 June 2022 | 22 October 2022 | 12 | 3 | 2 | 7 | 10 | 18 | −8 | 25.00 | |
| Total | | | | 65 | 26 | 19 | 20 | 87 | 79 | +8 | 40.00 | — |

== Honours ==
Valladolid

- Segunda División: 2006–07

Spain U16

- UEFA European Under-16 Championship: 1997
