= Gaizka Saizar =

Spanish footballer

Personal information
- Full name: Gaizka Saizar Lekuona
- Date of birth: 22 July 1980 (age 46)
- Place of birth: Oiartzun, Spain
- Height: 1.75 m (5 ft 9 in)
- Position: Forward

Youth career
- 1995–1999: Antiguoko

Senior career*
Years	Team	Apps	(Gls)
1999–2000	Sabadell	27	(0)
2000–2002	Espanyol B	55	(11)
2002–2004	Eibar	38	(7)
2003	→ Gimnàstic (loan)	20	(4)
2004–2006	Levante B	60	(17)
2006–2007	Ciudad Murcia	37	(8)
2007–2008	Granada 74	20	(2)
2008–2010	Tenerife	7	(0)
2010–2011	Ponferradina	34	(11)
2011–2012	Girona	15	(1)
2012–2013	Racing Santander	9	(0)
2013–2015	Real Unión	37	(4)
2015–2016	Castellón	11	(2)
Total		370	(67)
- * Club domestic league appearances and goals

Gaizka Saizar Lekuona (born 22 July 1980 in Oiartzun, Basque Country) is a Spanish former professional footballer who played as a forward.
