= Juanpa =

Spanish footballer

Personal information
- Full name: Juan Pablo de Miguel Bravo
- Date of birth: 28 September 1978 (age 48)
- Place of birth: Salamanca, Spain
- Height: 1.79 m (5 ft 10 1/2 in)
- Position: Right back

Senior career*
Years	Team	Apps	(Gls)
1998–2000	Salamanca B		
2000–2004	Salamanca	124	(2)
2004–2006	Numancia	64	(0)
2006–2007	Lorca Deportiva	33	(0)
2007–2010	Las Palmas	75	(3)
2011	Salamanca	17	(1)
2011–2012	Oviedo	28	(2)
Total		341	(8)
- * Club domestic league appearances and goals

Juan Pablo de Miguel Bravo (born 28 September 1978), commonly known as Juanpa, is a Spanish retired footballer who played as a right back.

== Football career ==
Juanpa was born in Salamanca, Region of León. During his career, spent mainly at local UD Salamanca and in Segunda División, he also represented CD Numancia (2004–05, his only La Liga experience), Lorca Deportiva CF, UD Las Palmas and Real Oviedo; he made his debut in the Spanish top flight on 19 September 2004, coming on as a 66th-minute substitute in a 1–0 home win against Getafe CF.

Juanpa retired at the end of the 2011–12 season, where he competed with Oviedo in Segunda División B. He amassed second level totals of 288 matches and five goals, over one full decade.
