= Asen (footballer) =

Spanish footballer

Personal information
- Full name: Jaime Asensio de la Fuente
- Date of birth: 7 October 1978 (age 48)
- Place of birth: Madrid, Spain
- Height: 1.80 m (5 ft 11 in)
- Position: Striker

Senior career*
Years	Team	Apps	(Gls)
1998–2000	Sorolla Pozuelo		
2000–2001	Rayo Majadahonda	18	(2)
2001–2002	Atlético Madrid B	42	(2)
2002–2005	Alcorcón	97	(20)
2005	Getafe	6	(0)
2005–2006	Extremadura	34	(19)
2006–2010	Córdoba	162	(37)
2010–2011	Albacete	18	(4)
2011–2012	Recreativo	34	(2)
2012–2014	Rayo Majadahonda	?	(20)
Total		411+	(106)
- * Club domestic league appearances and goals

Jaime Asensio de la Fuente (born 7 October 1978 in Madrid), commonly known as Asen, is a Spanish former professional footballer who played as a striker.
