= Kike Tortosa (footballer, born 1991) =

Spanish footballer

Personal information
- Full name: Enrique Tortosa Palma
- Date of birth: 10 February 1991 (age 35)
- Place of birth: Valencia, Spain
- Height: 1.76 m (5 ft 9 in)
- Position: Forward

Youth career
- Valencia

Senior career*
Years	Team	Apps	(Gls)
2009–2011	Valencia B	13	(0)
2011–2012	Recreativo	4	(0)
2012	Alavés	2	(0)
2012–2013	Alcoyano	16	(3)
2013–2016	Pobla Mafumet	90	(8)
2013–2014	Gimnàstic	6	(0)
2016–2017	Leioa	19	(0)
2017	Vilafranca	9	(0)
2017–2018	Eldense	28	(1)
2018–2021	Crevillente	71	(2)
2021–2022	Jove Español	33	(2)
Total		291	(16)
- * Club domestic league appearances and goals

Enrique 'Kike' Tortosa Palma (born 10 February 1991) is a Spanish former professional footballer who played as a forward.

== Club career ==
Born in Valencia, Tortosa made his senior debut with Valencia CF's reserves in the 2008–09 season, in the Segunda División B. After being sparingly used, he joined Recreativo de Huelva on 29 January 2011.

Tortosa played his first match as a professional on 15 April 2011, coming on as a second-half substitute in a 1–1 home draw against FC Barcelona B in the Segunda División. He appeared in a further three matches for Recre during the campaign.

On 13 January 2012, Tortosa signed with Deportivo Alavés. He only featured twice during his spell, and joined fellow division three club CD Alcoyano in the summer.

Despite playing more regularly with the latter, Tortosa was released and moved to Gimnàstic de Tarragona on 19 July 2013, being initially assigned to its farm team. On 6 July 2016, he signed for SD Leioa of the third tier.
