= Antonio Calle =

Spanish footballer (born 1978)

Personal information
- Full name: Antonio Sánchez de la Calle
- Date of birth: 14 October 1978 (age 48)
- Place of birth: Madrid, Spain
- Height: 1.85 m (6 ft 1 in)
- Position: Striker

Youth career
- Real Madrid

Senior career*
Years	Team	Apps	(Gls)
1996–1997	Rayo Vallecano B		
1997–1998	Fuencarral		
1998–1999	Amorós		
1999–2000	Talavera	22	(7)
2000–2001	Onda	8	(0)
2002–2004	Xerez	89	(27)
2004–2006	Recreativo	50	(9)
2007	Albacete	21	(12)
2007–2009	Gimnàstic	28	(5)
2008–2009	→ Xerez (loan)	29	(8)
2009–2010	Girona	20	(3)
2010–2011	Valladolid	15	(4)
2011–2014	Albacete	124	(35)
2014–2016	Socuéllamos	67	(16)
2016–2017	Villarrobledo	37	(24)
Total		510	(150)

Managerial career
- 2019: Xerez
- 2019–2021: Recreativo B
- 2021: Recreativo
- 2021–2022: Huesca (assistant)
- 2022–2023: Ponferradina (assistant)
- 2023: SS Reyes
- 2024–2025: Bollullos
- * Club domestic league appearances and goals

Antonio Sánchez de la Calle (born 14 October 1978) is a Spanish former professional footballer who played as a striker, currently a manager.

He amassed Segunda División totals of 258 matches and 70 goals over ten seasons, representing in the competition Xerez, Recreativo, Albacete, Gimnàstic, Girona and Valladolid. He played in La Liga with the second club, in 2006–07.

== Playing career ==
Calle was born in Madrid. Having spent his early years playing mostly in the area, including stints with Rayo Vallecano and Atlético Madrid's reserve teams, he joined Segunda División side Xerez CD in January 2002, where his impressive scoring rate attracted the attention of neighbours Recreativo de Huelva, which signed him for the 2004–05 season.

After having scored twice in La Liga in his first top-division experience (both in a 3–2 away win against Real Sociedad on 24 September 2006), Calle was deemed surplus to requirements and finished the campaign in division two with Albacete Balompié, having another good individual record. In 2007–08 he played with Gimnàstic de Tarragona, returning the following season to Xerez on loan and contributing eight goals in 1,523 minutes as the Andalusians achieved a first-ever promotion to the top flight.

After the 2009 August transfer window had already closed, Calle moved to Girona FC also of the second tier. Thus, he had to wait until January of the following year to appear officially for his new team.

Calle stayed in the second division for the 2010–11 campaign, with the 31-year-old signing for Real Valladolid in the summer and joining former club Albacete in January 2011. He subsequently represented UD Socuéllamos and CP Villarrobledo, and announced his retirement on 21 June 2017.

== Coaching career ==
Calle began working as a manager in early 2019, going on to be in charge of Xerez in the Tercera División and Atlético Onubense in the Andalusian regional leagues.

== Honours ==
Recreativo

- Segunda División: 2005–06

Xerez

- Segunda División: 2008–09
