= Kike Tortosa (footballer, born 1983) =

Spanish footballer

Personal information
- Full name: Enrique Tortosa García
- Date of birth: 13 July 1983 (age 43)
- Place of birth: Alzira, Spain
- Height: 1.77 m (5 ft 9 1/2 in)
- Position: Right-back

Youth career
- Alzira
- 2000–2001: Valencia
- 2001–2002: Alzira

Senior career*
Years	Team	Apps	(Gls)
2002–2003	Alzira		
2003–2006	Benidorm	58	(0)
2006–2011	Albacete	106	(0)
2012	Burgos	14	(0)
2012–2013	Guadalajara	16	(0)
Total		194+	(0)
- * Club domestic league appearances and goals

Enrique 'Kike' Tortosa García (born 13 July 1983 in Alzira, Valencia) is a Spanish former professional footballer who played as a right-back.
