= Antonio Gómez (footballer, born 1973) =

Spanish footballer and manager

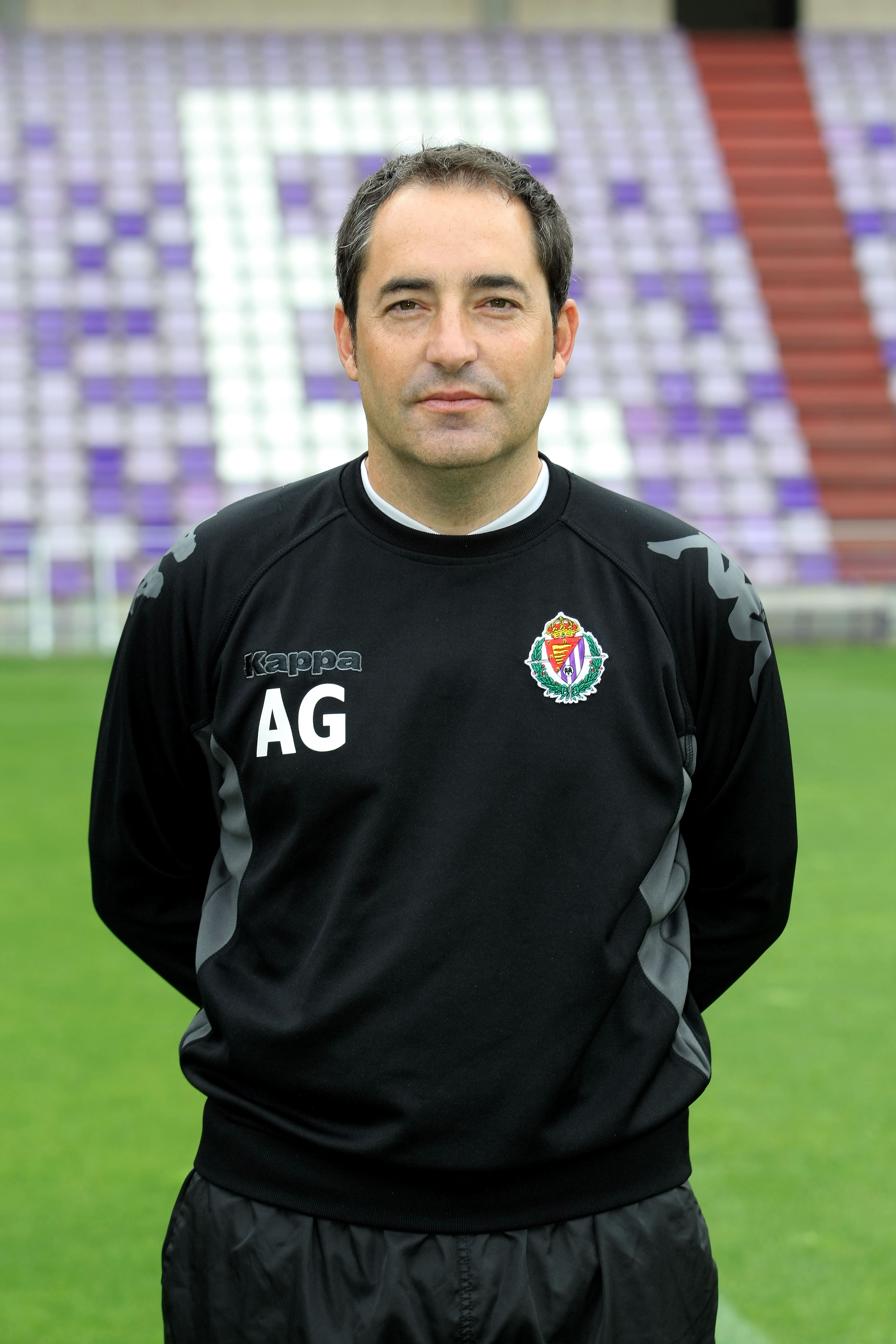
- Gómez as a Valladolid coach

Personal information
- Full name: Antonio Gómez Pérez
- Date of birth: 1 August 1973 (age 53)
- Place of birth: Madrid, Spain
- Height: 1.72 m (5 ft 7 1/2 in)
- Position: Midfielder

Youth career
- Real Madrid

Senior career*
Years	Team	Apps	(Gls)
1993–1994	Real Madrid C	33	(4)
1994–1996	Real Madrid B	53	(7)
1995–1997	Real Madrid	6	(2)
1996–1997	→ Sevilla (loan)	14	(0)
1997–1998	Albacete	22	(1)
1998–2000	Hércules	16	(1)
2000–2003	Toledo	44	(1)
2003–2006	La Roda		
Total		188	(16)

Managerial career
- 2006–2007: Albacete (youth)
- 2007–2009: Albacete B
- 2009–2010: Liverpool (assistant)
- 2009–2010: Liverpool Reserves
- 2010: Valladolid
- 2011–2013: Albacete
- 2013–2015: Napoli (assistant)
- 2015–2016: Real Madrid (assistant)
- 2016–2019: Newcastle United (assistant)
- 2019–2021: Dalian Yifang (assistant)
- 2021–2022: Everton (assistant)
- 2023–2024: Celta (assistant)
- 2025–2026: Panathinaikos (assistant)
- * Club domestic league appearances and goals

Antonio Gómez Pérez (Spanish pronunciation: [anˈtonjo ˈɣomeθ ˈpeɾeθ]; (Note: In isolation, Gómez is pronounced [ˈɡomeθ].) born 1 August 1973) is a Spanish former professional footballer who played as a midfielder.

== Playing career ==
Born in Madrid, Gómez was brought up in La Liga giants Real Madrid's youth ranks, making his first-team debut in the 1995–96 season as Jorge Valdano was the team coach. He scored twice in only six appearances during the campaign, but his presence with the main squad would be limited.

After an unassuming loan to Sevilla – 14 matches out of 42, top-flight relegation– Gómez was released by Real Madrid, continuing his career with Albacete (Segunda División), Hércules (two seasons, one in the Segunda División B), Toledo and amateurs La Roda and retiring in 2006 at the age of 33.

== Coaching career ==
In the summer of 2006, immediately after retiring, Gómez started coaching, first with former club Albacete's youth team, with which he won the Copa del Rey of the category. Subsequently, he stayed two years with the reserves in the Tercera División.

Gómez re-joined former Real Madrid B coach Rafael Benítez in 2009, being named Liverpool's assistant while also training their reserve team. On 23 June 2010 he announced his move to Real Valladolid, signing for 2010–11 in division two after the dismissal of former Spain national team boss Javier Clemente.

On 29 November 2010, following a 0–1 home loss against Cartagena, Gómez was fired by Valladolid, even though the Castile and León side ranked seventh in the league. From June 2011 to March 2013, he managed former club Albacete in the third tier, and subsequently worked with Benítez at Napoli, Real Madrid, Newcastle United, Dalian Yifang, Everton, Celta de Vigo and Panathinaikos.

== Managerial statistics ==
As of 16 March 2013

Managerial record by team and tenure
Team	Nat	From	To	Record								Ref
Team	Nat	From	To	G	W	D	L	GF	GA	GD	Win %	Ref
Albacete B	(Spain)	1 July 2007	30 June 2009	74	26	25	23	86	64	+22	35.14	
Valladolid	(Spain)	23 June 2010	29 November 2010	18	8	4	6	27	24	+3	44.44	
Albacete	(Spain)	18 June 2011	18 March 2013	79	35	24	20	101	70	+31	44.30	
Total				171	69	53	49	214	158	+56	40.35	—
