= 2009–10 Real Valladolid season =

Real Valladolid
2009–10 season
- President: Carlos Suárez Sureda
- Head coach: José Luis Mendilibar (until 1 February); Onésimo Sánchez (from 1 February until 5 April); Javier Clemente (from 5 April)
- Stadium: José Zorrilla
- La Liga: 18th (relegated)
- Copa del Rey: Round of 32
- Top goalscorer: League: Diego Costa (8); All: Diego Costa (9)
Home colours	Away colours	Third colours

The 2009–10 season was Real Valladolid's third consecutive season in La Liga.

José Luis Mendilibar began the season as team's coach, but was sacked on 1 February 2010 after the draw against Almería. Onésimo Sánchez became the new team coach and, after the defeat against Villarreal in Nuevo José Zorrilla, he was also sacked on 5 April. The directive discovered on 6 April the new team coach, Javier Clemente.

== Trophies balance ==
Category	Trophy	Started round	First match	Result	Last match
Friendly Trophy	14th Quinocho Memorial Trophy	Final	13 August 2009	Runner-up	13 August 2009
Friendly Trophy	2009 Teresa Rivero Trophy	Final	19 August 2009	Winner	19 August 2009
Friendly Trophy	37th Ciudad de Valladolid Trophy	Final	23 August 2009	Winner	23 August 2009
Friendly Trophy	Copa Castilla y León 2009–10	Semi-finals	8 September 2009	Runner-up	16 November 2010
Competitive	Liga BBVA	—	30 August 2009	18th	16 May 2010
Competitive	Copa del Rey	Round of 32	27 October 2009	Round of 32	11 November 2009

== Summer transfers ==
=== In ===
Player	From	Fee
(Spain) Héctor Font	(Spain) Osasuna	Free
(Spain) Antonio Barragán	(Spain) Deportivo	Free
(Spain) Fabricio	(Spain) Deportivo	Free
(Angola) Manucho	(England) Manchester United (was on loan at (England) Hull City)	Free
(Spain) Sisi	(Spain) Recreativo	Free
(Spain) Nauzet Alemán	(Spain) Las Palmas	Free
(Brazil) Nivaldo	(Qatar) Umm-Salal	Free
(Spain) César Arzo	(Spain) Villarreal	Free
(Spain) Marquitos	(Spain) Villarreal	Free
(Spain) Alberto Bueno	(Spain) Real Madrid (was playing with its reserve team)	€3M

=== Out ===
Player	New Team	Fee
(Spain) Ángel Vivar Dorado	(Spain) Albacete	Free
(Spain) Sergio Asenjo	(Spain) Atlético Madrid	€5.5M
(Spain) Víctor	(Spain) Cartagena	Free
(Spain) Pedro León	(Spain) Getafe	€4M
(Spain) Iñaki Bea	(Spain) Real Murcia	Free
(Spain) Óscar Sánchez	(Spain) Real Murcia	Free
(Spain) Kike	(Spain) Salamanca	Free

=== Loan in ===
Player	From
(Portugal) Pelé	(Portugal) Porto (was on loan at (England) Portsmouth)
(Brazil) Diego Costa	(Spain) Atlético Madrid (was on loan at (Spain) Albacete)

=== Loan return ===
Player	From
(Spain) Álvaro Antón^{1}	(Spain) Numancia
(Spain) Jacobo Sanz	(Spain) Getafe
(Spain) Asier	(Spain) Xerez

=== Loan end ===
Player	Returns to
(Argentina) Marcos Aguirre	(Argentina) Lanús
(Brazil) Pedro Oldoni	(Brazil) Paranaense
(Spain) Nano	(Spain) Real Betis
(Sweden) Henok Goitom	(Spain) Real Murcia
(Argentina) Damián Escudero	(Spain) Villarreal

=== Loan out ===
Player	Team
(Nigeria) Bartholomew Ogbeche	(Spain) Cádiz
(Spain) Álvaro Antón^{1}	(Spain) Recreativo
(Spain) Jesús Rueda	(Spain) Córdoba

== Winter transfers ==
=== In ===
Player	Team	Fee
(Portugal) Henrique Sereno	(Portugal) Vitória de Guimarães	Free

=== Out ===
Player	Team	Fee
(Spain) Asier	(Spain) Numancia	Free

=== Loan in ===
Player	From
(Spain) Keko	(Spain) Atlético Madrid
(Spain) Asier del Horno	(Spain) Valencia

== Youth system ==
No	Player	Position	Called for first time
26	(Spain) Yuri Berchiche	DF	v Almería (30 August 2009)
TBA	(Spain) Quique	MF	v Sevilla (5 December 2009)
27	(Spain) Carlos Lázaro	MF	v Racing de Santander (17 January 2010)
32	(Spain) Raúl Navas	DF	v Osasuna (21 February 2010)
31	(Spain) Javi Jiménez	GK	v Villarreal (4 April 2010)
29	(Spain) Sergio García	MF	v Villarreal (4 April 2010)

== Players ==
=== First-team squad ===
Note: Flags indicate national team as defined under FIFA eligibility rules; some limited exceptions apply. Players may hold more than one non-FIFA nationality.

No.	Pos.	Nation	Player
1	GK	PAR	Justo Villar
2	DF	ESP	Antonio Barragán
3	DF	ESP	Alberto Marcos (captain)
4	DF	BRA	Nivaldo
5	MF	BIH	Haris Medunjanin
6	MF	POR	Pelé (on loan from Porto)^{5}
7	FW	ESP	Nauzet Alemán
8	DF	ESP	Javier Baraja
9	FW	ANG	Manucho
10	MF	ESP	Borja
11	FW	ESP	Alberto Bueno
12	DF	POR	Henrique Sereno
13	GK	ESP	Fabricio
14	FW	ESP	Héctor Font
15	DF	ESP	Asier del Horno (on loan from Valencia)
16	DF	ESP	Pedro López

No.	Pos.	Nation	Player
17	DF	ESP	Luis Prieto
18	MF	ESP	Álvaro Rubio
19	FW	ESP	Jonathan Sesma
20	FW	URU	Fabián Canobbio
21	MF	ESP	Sisi
22	MF	BRA	Diego Costa (on loan from Atlético Madrid)
23	MF	ESP	Marquitos
24	DF	ESP	César Arzo
25	GK	ESP	Jacobo Sanz
26	DF	ESP	Yuri Berchiche (promoted from youth system)
27	MF	ESP	Carlos Lázaro (promoted from youth system)
29	MF	ESP	Sergio García (promoted from youth system)
31	GK	ESP	Javi Jiménez (promoted from youth system)
32	DF	ESP	Raúl Navas (promoted from youth system)
33	MF	ESP	Keko (on loan from Atlético Madrid; April Out)
—	MF	ESP	Quique (promoted from youth system)

=== CAN 2010 called players ===
Note: Flags indicate national team as defined under FIFA eligibility rules; some limited exceptions apply. Players may hold more than one non-FIFA nationality.

No.	Pos.	Nation	Player
9	FW	ANG	Manucho (Out between 10 and 24 Jan.)

=== U-19 national team called players ===
Note: Flags indicate national team as defined under FIFA eligibility rules; some limited exceptions apply. Players may hold more than one non-FIFA nationality.

No.	Pos.	Nation	Player
33	MF	ESP	Keko (Out between 13 and 21 Apr.)^{6}

== Match results ==
- All times are in CET/CEST

=== Pre-season and friendly tournaments ===
==== Friendly matches ====
24 July 2009	Los Gatos de Íscar (Spain)	2 – 5	Real Valladolid	Municipal de San Miguel, Íscar (Valladolid)
19:45	Agustín 19'; Viti 23'	(Report)	8', 43' Bueno; 37' Quique; 81' Asier; 83' Font	Attendance: 1,200; Referee: (Spain) Víctor Gijón Peñas

28 July 2009	Real Valladolid	1 – 2	(Spain) Zamora	Municipal Ground, Medina de Rioseco (Valladolid)^{2}
19:30	Marquitos 28'; Medunjanin (yellow card); Arzo (yellow card)	(Report)	17' (pen.) Alegre; 85' Aguado; (yellow card) A. Villar; (yellow card) Manu Arias	Attendance: 1,500; Referee: (Spain) José Ignacio Hernández Cifuentes

31 July 2009	Ipswich Town (England)	3 – 1	Real Valladolid	Portman Road, Ipswich
20:30 (Spain time); 19:30 (Local time)	Balkestein 62'; Wickham 76'; Prieto 84' (o.g.)	(Report)	31' (pen.) Baraja	Attendance: 6,000; Referee: (England) Dean Whitestone

2 August 2009	Leicester City (England)	1 – 0	Real Valladolid	Walkers Stadium, Leicester
16:00 (Spain time); 15:00 (Local time)	Fryatt 84'; Morrison (yellow card); Howard (yellow card)	(Report)	(yellow card) Barragán; (yellow card) Sesma	Attendance: 6,141; Referee: (England) Lee Mason

4 August 2009	Stockport County (England)	1 – 3	Real Valladolid	Edgeley Park, Stockport
20:30 (Spain time); 19:30 (Local time)	Havern 20'	(Report)	32' Nivaldo; 64' Sesma; 82' Manucho; (yellow card) Prieto	Attendance: 1,993; Referee: (England) Phil Dowd

7 August 2009	Stoke City (England)	2 – 2	Real Valladolid	Britannia Stadium, Stoke-on-Trent
20:00 (Spain time); 19:00 (Local time)	Whitehead 2'; Kitson 31' (pen.)	(Report)	51' Borja; 71' Bueno; (yellow card) Nivaldo	Attendance: 7,000; Referee: (England) Alan Wiley

8 August 2009	Wolves (England)	0 – 2	Real Valladolid	Molineux, Wolverhampton
16:00 (Spain time); 15:00 (Local time)		(Report)	29' Medunjanin; 89' Asier; (yellow card) Manucho	Attendance: 10,513; Referee: (England) Mark Clattenburg

16 August 2009	Racing de Santander	1 – 0	Real Valladolid	La Veigona, Luarca (Asturias)^{2}
18:00	Juanjo 46'; Pinillos (yellow card); Serrano (yellow card)	(Report)	(yellow card) Borja	Attendance: 500; Referee: (Spain) José Ramón Piñeiro Crespo

==== 14th Quinocho Memorial Trophy ====
13 August 2009 Final	Celta (Spain)	1 – 0	Real Valladolid	Balaídos, Vigo (Pontevedra)
21:00	Saulo 84'; Ortega (yellow card)	(Report)	(yellow card) Pelé; (yellow card) Arzo; (yellow card) Marcos	Attendance: 2,500; Referee: (Spain) Julio Amoedo Chas

==== 2009 Teresa Rivero Trophy ====
19 August 2009 Final	Rayo Vallecano (Spain)	1 – 3	Real Valladolid	Teresa Rivero, Vallecas (Madrid)
21:00	Quero 22'; Jofre (yellow card)	(Report)	56' Sesma; 62' Borja; 81' Bueno; (yellow card) Arzo	Attendance: 5,000; Referee: (Spain) José Luis Lesma López

==== 37th Ciudad de Valladolid Trophy ====
23 August 2009 Final	Real Valladolid	1 – 0	Villarreal	Nuevo José Zorrilla, Valladolid
19:00	Nivaldo 30'; Canobbio (yellow card); Prieto (yellow card); Barragán (yellow card)	(Report)	(yellow card) Oriol	Attendance: 7,200; Referee: (Spain) Javier Turienzo Álvarez

==== Copa Castilla y León 2009–10 ====
Semi-finals
16 September 2009– Aranda de Duero
Arandina	0
UD Salamanca	5
8 September 2009– Palencia
Palencia	0
Real Valladolid	5

Final
16 November 2010– Salamanca
UD Salamanca	2
Real Valladolid	1

8 September 2009 Semifinal	Palencia	0 – 5	Real Valladolid	Nueva Balastera, Palencia
20:30 CET	Agostinho (yellow card)	(Report)	9', 24' Costa; 46', 72' Bueno; 87' Canobbio	Attendance: 2,000; Referee: (Spain) Jorge Valdés Aller

The final of this tournament had to be played on April 23, 2010, the Castilla y León's day, but as both finalists had some problems in their leagues (Real Valladolid in Liga BBVA, finally relegated, and UD Salamanca in Liga Adelante), the final was postponed to the 2010–11 season.

16 November 2010 Final	UD Salamanca	2 – 1	Real Valladolid	El Helmántico, Villares de la Reina
20:30 CET	Martín 42'; De la Nava (yellow card) 51'; García 60'; Ramos (yellow card) 83'		21', (yellow card) 87' Raúl Navas; (yellow card) 33' Lázaro	Attendance: 5,400; Referee: (Spain) Rubén Gómez González

=== Liga BBVA ===
Matchday	1	2	3	4	5	6	7	8	9	10	11	12	13	14	15	16	17	18	19	20	21	22	23	24	25	26	27	28	29	30	31	32	33	34	35	36	37	38
Result against	ALM	VAL	ZAR	OSA	MLL	ATH	RMA	DEP	ESP	XER	VIL	TEN	SEV	MGA	SPG	GET	ATM	RAC	FCB	ALM	VAL	ZAR	OSA	MLL	ATH	RMA	DEP	ESP	XER	VIL	TEN	SEV	MGA	SPG	GET	ATM	RAC	FCB
Venue	A	H	A	H	A	H	A	H	A	H	A	H	A	H	H	A	H	A	H	H	A	H	A	H	A	H	A	H	A	H	A	H	A	A	H	A	H	A
Position	11	16	8	13	16	16	17	14	14	14	15	15	15	13	11	13	16	17	17	17	18	19	18	18	18	19	18	18	19	19	19	19	19	19	19	19	16	18
Goal Average (useful in case of tie)^{4}																				Lost	Lost	Won	Lost	Lost	Lost	Lost	Won	Won	Lost	Lost	Lost	Won	Lost	Won	Lost	Lost	Won	Lost

		All							Home					Away				
		Pts	W	D	L	F	A	Dif.	W	D	L	F	A	W	D	L	F	A
18	Real Valladolid (R)	36	7	15	16	37	62	−25	4	8	7	23	32	3	7	9	14	30

Liga del Juego Limpio
Position	Team	Supporters' Behavior Overall Between 0 and 5 stars
7	Real Valladolid	(3.02)

- With José Luis Mendilibar

30 August 2009	Almería	0 – 0	Real Valladolid	Juegos del Mediterráneo, Almería
21:00	Míchel (yellow card) 74'; Bernardello (yellow card) 86'	(Report)	(red card) 12' Nivaldo; (yellow card) 16' Yuri; (yellow card) 88' Borja; (yellow card) 89' Jacobo	Attendance: 9,100; Referee: Antonio Miguel Mateu Lahoz

13 September 2009	Real Valladolid	2 – 4	Valencia	Nuevo José Zorrilla, Valladolid
19:00	Nauzet 30'; Arzo (yellow card) 53'; Manucho 65'	(Report)	10' Silva; (yellow card) 19' Marchena; 34', 55' Villa; 44' Mata; (yellow card) 89' Bruno	Attendance: 18,200; Referee: Alberto Undiano Mallenco

20 September 2009	Real Zaragoza	1 – 2	Real Valladolid	La Romareda, Zaragoza
17:00	López 26'	(Report)	3' Marquitos; (yellow card) 48' Arzo; 56' Sisi; (yellow card) 89' Costa	Attendance: 22,000; Referee: Rafael Ramírez Domínguez

23 September 2009	Real Valladolid	1 – 2	Osasuna	Nuevo José Zorrilla, Valladolid
20:00	Medunjanin (yellow card) 7'; Manucho (yellow card) 32'; Prieto (red card) 40'; Costa 48'; Arzo (yellow card) 57', (red card) 81'; Font (yellow card) 60'	(Report)	24' Pandiani; (yellow card) 37' Monreal; (yellow card) 66' Flaño; (yellow card) 68' Rúper; 71' Galán; (yellow card) 86' Ricardo	Attendance: 14,494; Referee: José Luis Paradas Romero

27 September 2009	Mallorca	3 – 0	Real Valladolid	ONO Estadi, Mallorca
17:00	Nunes 3'; Aduriz 69'; Valero 72'	(Report)		Attendance: 12,000; Referee: David Fernández Borbalán

4 October 2009	Real Valladolid	2 – 2	Athletic Bilbao	Nuevo José Zorrilla, Valladolid
17:00	Nivaldo (yellow card) 11'; Borja (yellow card) 30'; Prieto (yellow card) 44'; Costa 60'; Marcos (yellow card) 64' (yellow-red card) 70'; Nivaldo 75', (yellow card) 79'; Rubio (yellow card) 81'	(Report)	9' Susaeta; (red card) 22' Ustaritz; (yellow card) 25' Yeste; (yellow card) 33' Etxeita; (yellow card) 41' Koikili; (yellow card) 74' Ocio; 77' Muniain	Attendance: 19,845; Referee: Antonio Miguel Mateu Lahoz

17 October 2009	Real Madrid	4 – 2	Real Valladolid	Santiago Bernabéu, Madrid
20:00	Raúl 13', 18'; Ramos (yellow card) 43'; Marcelo 44'; Alonso (yellow card) 54'; Higuaín 77'	(Report)	(yellow card) 20' Arzo; 29' Nauzet; 53' Marquitos; (yellow card) 88' Pelé	Attendance: 79,000; Referee: Miguel Ángel Ayza Gámez

25 October 2009	Real Valladolid	4 – 0	Deportivo	Nuevo José Zorrilla, Valladolid
17:00	Costa (yellow card) 8' (goal) 75'; Nauzet 18', 46'; Pelé (yellow card) 82'; Medunjanin 83', (yellow card) 83'	(Report)	(yellow card) 60' Colotto	Attendance: 17,479; Referee: Carlos Delgado Ferreiro

1 November 2009	Espanyol	1 – 1	Real Valladolid	Nou Estadi Cornellà-El Prat, Barcelona
17:00	Marqués (yellow card) 31'; García 50'; Roncaglia (yellow card) 52'; Forlín (yellow card) 84'	(Report)	(yellow card) 29' Costa; (yellow card) 44' Nivaldo; (yellow card) 56' Nauzet; (yellow card) 73' López; 90+2' Medunjanin	Attendance: 27,130; Referee: Manuel Enrique Mejuto González

8 November 2009	Real Valladolid	0 – 0	Xerez	Nuevo José Zorrilla, Valladolid
17:00		(Report)	(yellow card) 53' (yellow-red card) 90+2' Prieto; (yellow card) 76' Aythami; (yellow card) 86' Renan; (yellow card) 88' Keita	Attendance: 16,231; Referee: Carlos Velasco Carballo

22 November 2009	Villarreal	3 – 1	Real Valladolid	El Madrigal, Villarreal (Castellón)
17:00	Nilmar 6', 47'; Rossi (yellow card) 22' (goal) 56'	(Report)	(yellow card) 40' Baraja; 60' Costa; (yellow card) 72' Borja	Attendance: 18,000; Referee: Alfonso J. Álvarez Izquierdo

29 November 2009	Real Valladolid	3 – 3	Tenerife	Nuevo José Zorrilla, Valladolid
17:00	Costa 28', 50'; Manucho (yellow card) 29'; Canobbio 35'; Marcos (yellow card) 69'	(Report)	(yellow card) 18' Ricardo; (yellow card) 37' Bellvís; 62' Nino; 70' Ángel; (yellow card) 83' (yellow-red card) 88' (goal) 88' Luna	Attendance: 12,801; Referee: Miguel Ángel Ayza Gámez

5 December 2009	Sevilla	1 – 1	Real Valladolid	Ramón Sánchez Pizjuán, Seville
18:00	Fabiano 44' (yellow card) 86'; Navas (yellow card) 50'; Dragutinović (yellow card) 55'; Romaric (yellow card) 86'	(Report)	(yellow card) 7' Costa; (yellow card) 20' Nivaldo; 33' Manucho; (red card) 38' Borja; (yellow card) 42' Pelé; (yellow card) 81' Villar	Attendance: 38,500; Referee: Alfonso Pérez Burrull

13 December 2009	Real Valladolid	1 – 1	Málaga	Nuevo José Zorrilla, Valladolid
17:00	Marcos (yellow card) 15'; Nivaldo 69'; Nauzet (yellow card) 85'; Prieto (yellow card) 88'	(Report)	34' Duda; (yellow card) 35' Obinna; (yellow card) 59' Iván; (yellow card) 77' Gaspar	Attendance: 13,345; Referee: Bernardino González Vázquez

20 December 2009	Real Valladolid	2 – 1	Sporting de Gijón	Nuevo José Zorrilla, Valladolid
17:00	Pelé (yellow card) 11'; Nivaldo 29' (yellow card) 35'; Medunjanin 88'; Costa (yellow card) 88'	(Report)	13' Morán; (yellow card) 55' Botía; (yellow card) 78' Rivera	Attendance: 16,765; Referee: Antonio Rubinos Pérez

3 January 2010	Getafe	1 – 0	Real Valladolid	El Coliseum, Getafe (Madrid)
17:00	Casquero 83'; Soldado (yellow card) 83'	(Report)	(yellow card) 15' Arzo; (yellow card) 62' Nauzet; (yellow card) 64' Barragán	Referee: Fernando Teixeira Vitienes

9 January 2010	Real Valladolid	0 – 4	Atlético Madrid	Nuevo José Zorrilla, Valladolid
18:00	López (yellow card) 52'; Canobbio (yellow card) 64'; Nivaldo (yellow card) 70'; Marquitos (yellow card) 72'; Pelé (yellow card) 83'	(Report)	17' Jurado; 32' Forlán; 59' Reyes; (yellow card) 66' Perea; 89' Agüero	Attendance: 16,246; Referee: Eduardo Iturralde González

17 January 2010	Racing de Santander	1 – 1	Real Valladolid	El Sardinero, Santander
17:00	Canales 60'; Torrejón (yellow card) 66'	(Report)	19' (o.g.) Pinillos; (yellow card) 31' Baraja; (yellow card) 40' Borja	Referee: Xavier Estrada Fernández

23 January 2010	Real Valladolid	0 – 3	Barcelona	Nuevo José Zorrilla, Valladolid
20:00	Marcos (yellow card) 80'; Borja (yellow card) 85'	(Report)	21' Xavi; 22' Alves; (yellow card) 42' Piqué; (yellow card) 50' Keita; 56' Messi	Referee: Rafael Ramírez Domínguez

31 January 2010	Real Valladolid	1 – 1	Almería	Nuevo José Zorrilla, Valladolid
17:00	Manucho (yellow card) 26', (red card) 37'; Prieto (yellow card) 44'; Canobbio (yellow card) 66'; Medunjanin^{3} 80'; Costa (yellow card) 90'	(Report)	12' Crusat; (yellow card) 22' Soriano; (yellow card) 32' Pellerano	Referee: César Muñiz Fernández

- With Onésimo Sánchez

6 February 2010	Valencia	2 – 0	Real Valladolid	Mestalla, Valencia
18:00	Banega 8'; Villa 29'	(Report)	(yellow card) 59' Costa; (yellow card) 88' Pelé	Referee: Antonio Rubinos Pérez

14 February 2010	Real Valladolid	1 – 1	Real Zaragoza	Nuevo José Zorrilla, Valladolid
17:00	Costa 23'; Pelé (yellow card) 29'; Del Horno (yellow card) 35'; Borja (yellow card) 72'; Arzo (yellow card) 81'	(Report)	(yellow card) 9' Jarošík; (yellow card) 14', (goal) 39' Suazo; (yellow card) 30' Diogo; (yellow card) 51' Contini; (red card) 64' Herrera	Referee: David Fernández Borbalán

21 February 2010	Osasuna	1 – 1	Real Valladolid	Reyno de Navarra, Pamplona
17:00	Juanfran (yellow card) 69'; Monreal (yellow card) 76'; Camuñas 86'	(Report)	80' Medunjanin; (yellow card) 88' Borja	Referee: Eduardo Iturralde González

28 February 2010	Real Valladolid	1 – 2	Mallorca	Nuevo José Zorrilla, Valladolid
17:00	Bueno 49'; López (yellow card) 71'; Costa (yellow card) 73'	(Report)	(yellow card) 18' Ayoze; 69' Rubén; (yellow card) 73' Josemi; (yellow card) 81' Castro; 83' Julio	Referee: Carlos Clos Gómez

7 March 2010	Athletic Bilbao	2 – 0	Real Valladolid	San Mamés, Bilbao
19:00	Toquero 27', 37'	(Report)		Referee: Antonio Miguel Mateu Lahoz

14 March 2010	Real Valladolid	1 – 4	Real Madrid	Nuevo José Zorrilla, Valladolid
21:00	Del Horno (yellow card) 13'; Lázaro (yellow card) 23'; Medunjanin (yellow card) 28'; Nauzet (yellow card) 53'; Albiol 58' (o.g.); Pelé (yellow card) 88'	(Report)	(yellow card) 20' Ramos; 28' Ronaldo; (yellow card) 30' Alonso; (yellow card) 36' Granero; 44', 51', 64' Higuaín	Referee: Manuel Enrique Mejuto González

20 March 2010	Deportivo	0 – 2	Real Valladolid	Riazor, A Coruña
18:00		(Report)	39' Nauzet; 90' Medunjanin	Referee: Alberto Undiano Mallenco

24 March 2010	Real Valladolid	0 – 0	Espanyol	Nuevo José Zorrilla, Valladolid
20:00	Del Horno (yellow card) 36'; Costa (red card) 36'; Borja (yellow card) 43'; Pelé (yellow card) 44'; López (yellow card) 62'	(Report)	(yellow card) 30' Baena; (yellow card) 38' (yellow-red card) 90+1' Ruiz; (yellow card) 54' Osvaldo	Attendance: 16,062; Referee: Miguel Ángel Pérez Lasa

28 March 2010	Xerez	3 – 0	Real Valladolid	Chapín, Jerez de la Frontera (Cádiz)
17:00	Sánchez 1'; Míchel 36'; Bermejo (yellow card) 38', (goal) 72' (pen.); Redondo (yellow card) 43'	(Report)	(yellow card) 29' Pelé; (yellow card) 32' Sereno; (yellow card) 60' Arzo; (yellow card) 61' Nauzet; (red card) 71' Villar	Referee: Alfonso Pérez Burrull

4 April 2010	Real Valladolid	0 – 2	Villarreal	Nuevo José Zorrilla, Valladolid
17:00	Font (yellow card) 55'; Sisi (yellow card) 70'; Del Horno (yellow card) 79'	(Report)	9' (yellow card) 9' Ángel; (yellow card) 22' Llorente; (yellow card) 34' Cani; 58' Nilmar; (yellow card) 70' Bruno	Referee: Xavier Estrada Fernández

- With Javier Clemente

10 April 2010	Tenerife	0 – 0	Real Valladolid	Heliodoro Rodríguez López, Tenerife
20:00 (Spain time); 19:00 (Local time)	Ricardo (yellow card) 44'; Bertrán (yellow card) 82'	(Report)	(yellow card) 52' Manucho; (yellow card) 75' Baraja; (yellow card) 78' Jacobo; (yellow card) 86' Borja	Referee: Carlos Velasco Carballo

13 April 2010	Real Valladolid	2 – 1	Sevilla FC	Nuevo José Zorrilla, Valladolid
20:00	Sereno (yellow card) 4'; Barragán (yellow card) 14'; Costa 41'; Del Horno (yellow card) 49'; Manucho 53'; Nauzet (yellow card) 58'; Baraja (yellow card) 88'	(Report)	(yellow card) 39' Palop; 82' Cala	Attendance: 18,961; Referee: Alfonso J. Álvarez Izquierdo

18 April 2010	Málaga	0 – 0	Real Valladolid	La Rosaleda, Málaga
17:00	Juanito (yellow card) 10'; Gámez (yellow card) 24'	(Report)	(yellow card) 16' Nivaldo; (yellow card) 25' Borja	Referee: Carlos Clos Gómez

25 April 2010	Sporting de Gijón	0 – 2	Real Valladolid	El Molinón, Gijón
17:00	Botía (yellow card) 12'; Maldonado (red card) 85'; Mateo (yellow card) 87'	(Report)	(yellow card) 12' Costa; (yellow card) 14' Nivaldo; (yellow card) 29' (yellow-red card) 85' Del Horno; (yellow card) 73' López; 79' Manucho; 90+3' Baraja	Referee: Miguel Ángel Pérez Lasa

1 May 2010	Real Valladolid	0 – 0	Getafe	Nuevo José Zorrilla, Valladolid
18:00	Prieto (yellow card) 43'; Nauzet (yellow card) 60'	(Report)	(yellow card) 34' (yellow-red card) 57' Cortés; (yellow card) 38' Adrián; (yellow card) 71' Díaz; (yellow card) 77' Rafa	Referee: Xavier Estrada Fernández

5 May 2010	Atlético Madrid	3 – 1	Real Valladolid	Vicente Calderón, Madrid
20:00	Juanito 43'; Jurado 66'; Forlán 72'	(Report)	76', (yellow card) 87' Sesma; (yellow card) 87' Nauzet	Referee: Miguel Ángel Ayza Gámez

8 May 2010	Real Valladolid	2 – 1	Racing de Santander	Nuevo José Zorrilla, Valladolid
21:00	Barragán (yellow card) 36'; Baraja 57'; Nauzet 76' (pen.); Borja (yellow card) 77' (yellow-red card) 81'	(Report)	28' Christian; (yellow card) 68' Canales; (yellow card) 78' (yellow-red card) 86' Moratón; (yellow card) 84' Bolado	Referee: Carlos Velasco Carballo

16 May 2010	Barcelona	4 – 0	Real Valladolid	Camp Nou, Barcelona
19:00	Prieto 27' (o.g.); Pedro 31'; Messi 61', 74'; Alves (yellow card) 67'	(Report)	(yellow card) 44' Barragán; (yellow card) 48' Manucho; (yellow card) 54' Baraja	Referee: Miguel Ángel Pérez Lasa

Biggest win
Home				Away			
October 25, 2009	Matchday 8	v. Deportivo	4 – 0	March 20, 2010	Matchday 27	v. Deportivo	0 – 2
October 25, 2009	Matchday 8	v. Deportivo	4 – 0	April 25, 2010	Matchday 34	v. Sporting Gijón	0 – 2
Biggest loss
Home				Away			
January 9, 2010	Matchday 17	v. Atlético Madrid	0 – 4	May 16, 2010	Matchday 38	v. Barcelona	4 – 0

=== Copa del Rey ===
==== Round of 32 ====
===== First leg =====
29 October 2009
21:00

Real Valladolid	2 – 1	RCD Mallorca
Arzo 2'; Marquitos (yellow card) 68'; Costa 78'	(Report)	(yellow card) 45' Tuni; (yellow card) 60' Mattioni; (yellow card) 68' Varela; (yellow card) 68' Valero; 72' Martí

Nuevo José Zorrilla, Valladolid
Referee: Eduardo Iturralde González

===== Second leg =====
11 November 2009
21:00

RCD Mallorca	1 – 0	Real Valladolid
Nunes (yellow card) 24'; Víctor (yellow card) 32'; Keita 39'	(Report)	(yellow card) 23' Asier; (yellow card) 32' Font

ONO Estadi, Mallorca
Attendance: 9,300
Referee: Manuel Enrique Mejuto González

Real Valladolid 2–2 RCD Mallorca on aggregate. RCD Mallorca won on away goals.

== Others ==
=== Polemic game against Real Madrid ===
14 March 2010
21:00

Real Valladolid	1 – 4	Real Madrid
del Horno (yellow card) 13'; Lázaro (yellow card) 23'; Medunjanin (yellow card) 28'; Nauzet (yellow card) 53'; Albiol 58' (o.g.); Pelé (yellow card) 88'	(Report)	(yellow card) 20' Ramos; 28' Ronaldo; (yellow card) 30' Alonso; (yellow card) 36' Granero; 44', 51', 64' Higuaín

Nuevo José Zorrilla, Valladolid
Referee: Manuel Enrique Mejuto González

From the end of this match, the national press was fed by Real Valladolid. They accused it of violent and aggressive because of the badly referee's performance and the unfortunate foul committed by Nivaldo on Cristiano Ronaldo. Onésimo Sánchez, the press of Valladolid, Carlos Suárez and some Real Valladolid players were defending themselves saying that the match was not violent and that the referee's performance was wrong because of the non-signposting of two penalties (both of them committed by Sergio Ramos, booked at the 20th minute) to its favour and not by not send off any Valladolid player. A sector of Valladolid press assured to have seen Jorge Valdano, Real Madrid's general manager, to take to Mejuto González and his assistants at the half time of the match two black sport bags which content could not be revealed.

=== Llanes deal ===
It's a supposed deal emerged because of the speculation between the supporters of Sporting Gijón and Racing Santander, twinned from some years ago. It consists in tampering Liga BBVA's last matchday with a double target: if Sporting Gijón loses (mathematically saved for the relegation), Racing Santander will win 3 points which will save the Miguel Ángel Portugal's team, harming and making more difficult the non-relegation for one of the most hated teams in Gijón: Real Valladolid. Obviously, presidents, coaches and players from both teams gradually denied this speculation, but the Spanish press continues speculating and encouraging this rumor. The name was invented by a sportswriter who noticed the table situation. Called Llanes deal because Llanes is a village between Asturias and Cantabria, autonomous communities in which Gijón and Santander are located.

Situation after the matchday 37:

Pos	Team	Pld	W	D	L	GF	GA	GD	Pts	Qualification
1	Barcelona (Q)	37	30	6	1	94	24	+70	96	2010–11 UEFA Champions League Group stage
2	Real Madrid (Q)	37	31	2	4	101	34	+67	95	2010–11 UEFA Champions League Group stage
3	Valencia (Q)	37	20	8	9	58	40	+18	68	2010–11 UEFA Champions League Group stage

(Q) Qualified for the phase indicated

...

Pos	Team	Pld	W	D	L	GF	GA	GD	Pts	Qualification or relegation
11	Espanyol	37	11	11	15	29	44	−15	44	
12	Almería	37	10	12	15	41	52	−11	42	
13	Osasuna	37	11	9	17	36	45	−9	42	
14	Sporting Gijón	37	9	13	15	36	49	−13	40	
15	Zaragoza	37	10	10	17	43	61	−18	40	
16	Valladolid	37	7	15	15	37	58	−21	36	
17	Racing Santander	37	8	12	17	40	59	−19	36	
18	Málaga	37	7	15	15	41	47	−6	36	Relegation to Segunda División
19	Tenerife	37	9	9	19	40	73	−33	36	Relegation to Segunda División
20	Xerez	37	8	9	20	37	65	−28	33	Relegation to Segunda División

Matchday 38:

Matchday 38
May 16 2010	19:00 CEST	Barcelona	4 – 0	Valladolid
May 16 2010	19:00 CEST	Málaga	1 – 1	Real Madrid
May 16 2010	19:00 CEST	Valencia	1 – 0	Tenerife
May 16 2010	19:00 CEST	Racing Santander	2 – 0	Sporting Gijón
May 16 2010	19:00 CEST	Osasuna	1 – 1	Xerez

=== Battle for the non-relegation ===
According to the course of the season, the calculations indicate that with 40 points or more, the teams will not be relegated to Liga Adelante, so that, assuming Sporting Gijón and UD Almería are now saved (both with 37 points in the 30th matchday), the teams involved in the fight for non-relegation, waiting yet for several face-to-face between the teams involved, are the follows, including Real Valladolid:

Xerez
	Pos.	Team	Points
30	20th	XER	23
31	20th	v. GET	23
32	20th	v. ATM	26
33	20th	v. RAC	27
34	20th	v. FCB	27
35	20th	v. ALM	30
36	20th	v. VAL	30
37	20th	v. ZAR	33
38	20th	v. OSA	34
Relegated
20th		XER	34

Tenerife
	Pos.	Team	Points
30	18th	TEN	25
31	18th	v. VAD	26
32	18th	v. SPG	29
33	18th	v. GET	32
34	18th	v. ATM	32
35	18th	v. RAC	35
36	18th	v. FCB	35
37	19th	v. ALM	36
38	19th	v. VAL	36
Relegated
19th		TEN	36

Real Valladolid
	Pos.	Team	Points
30	19th	VAD	24
31	19th	v. TEN	25
32	19th	v. SEV	28
33	19th	v. MGA	29
34	19th	v. SPG	32
35	19th	v. GET	33
36	19th	v. ATM	33
37	16th	v. RAC	36
38	18th	v. FCB	36
Relegated
18th		VAD	36

Málaga
	Pos.	Team	Points
30	16th	MGA	31
31	17th	v. SEV	31
32	17th	v. OSA	32
33	17th	v. VAD	33
34	17th	v. MLL	34
35	17th	v. SPG	35
36	16th	v. ATH	36
37	18th	v. GET	36
38	17th	v. RMA	37
Saved
17th		MGA	37

Racing Santander
	Pos.	Team	Points
30	17th	RAC	31
31	15th	v. DEP	32
32	15th	v. ESP	35
33	15th	v. XER	36
34	15th	v. VIL	36
35	16th	v. TEN	36
36	17th	v. SEV	36
37	17th	v. VAD	36
38	16th	v. SPG	39
Saved
16th		RAC	39

Real Zaragoza
	Pos.	Team	Points
30	15th	ZAR	32
31	16th	v. OSA	32
32	16th	v. MLL	33
33	16th	v. ATH	34
34	16th	v. RMA	34
35	15th	v. DEP	37
36	14th	v. ESP	40
37	15th	v. XER	40
Saved
38	14th	v. VIL	41
14th		ZAR	41

CA Osasuna
	Pos.	Team	Points
30	13th	OSA	34
31	12th	v. ZAR	37
32	11th	v. MGA	38
33	11th	v. MLL	38
34	12th	v. ATH	39
35	12th	v. RMA	39
36	11th	v. DEP	42
Saved
37	13th	v. ESP	42
38	12th	v. XER	43
12th		OSA	43

RCD Espanyol
	Pos.	Team	Points
30	14th	ESP	34
31	14th	v. ATM	37
32	14th	v. RAC	37
33	13th	v. FCB	38
34	11th	v. ALM	41
35	11th	v. VAL	41
36	12th	v. ZAR	41
37	11th	v. OSA	44
Saved
38	11th	v. MLL	44
11th		ESP	44

ATH	ATM	OSA	DEP	FCB	GET	MGA	RAC	ESP	MLL	RMA	VAD	ZAR	SEV	SPG	TEN	ALM	VAL	VIL	XER
Athletic	Atlético	Osasuna	Deportivo	Barcelona	Getafe	Málaga	Racing	Espanyol	Mallorca	R. Madrid	Valladolid	Zaragoza	Sevilla	Sporting	Tenerife	Almería	Valencia	Villarreal	Xerez

Victory (+ 3)
Draw (+ 1)
Defeat (0)

==== Real Valladolid's goal averages ====
Real Valladolid's goal averages
Against	Goal Average	First match	Second match
Xerez	Lost	0 – 0	3 – 0
Tenerife	Lost	3 – 3	0 – 0
Racing Santander	Won	1 – 1	2 – 1
Málaga	Lost	1 – 1	0 – 0
Real Zaragoza	Won	1 – 2	1 – 1
RCD Espanyol	Won	1 – 1	0 – 0
CA Osasuna	Lost	1 – 2	1 – 1
Sporting Gijón	Won	2 – 1	0 – 2
UD Almería	Lost	0 – 0	1 – 1

==== League table ====
Pos	Team	Pld	W	D	L	GF	GA	GD	Pts	Qualification or relegation
16	Racing Santander	38	9	12	17	42	59	−17	39	
17	Málaga	38	7	16	15	42	48	−6	37	
18	Valladolid (R)	38	7	15	16	37	62	−25	36 (Note: VLD 3–3 TEN; TEN 0–0 VLD. As the aggregate score is a draw (3–3), the team with the higher goal difference between these two teams qualifies first and over the other one (Valladolid 18th, with −25; Tenerife 19th with −34))	Relegation to the Segunda División
19	Tenerife (R)	38	9	9	20	40	74	−34	36	Relegation to the Segunda División
20	Xerez (R)	38	8	10	20	38	66	−28	34	Relegation to the Segunda División

Source: LFP and Yahoo! Sport
Rules for classification: 1) points; 2) head-to-head points; 3) head-to-head goal difference; 4) head-to-head goals scored; 5) goal difference; 6) number of goals scored.
(R) Relegated
