= 2010–11 Castilla y León Cup =

2010–11 Copa Castilla y León
Tournament details
- Host country: Spain
- Dates: From July 25, 2010 to June 7, 2011
- Teams: 12
- Venues: 10 (in 10 host cities)

Final positions
- Champions: SD Ponferradina (1st title)
- Runners-up: UD Salamanca

Tournament statistics
- Matches played: 15
- Goals scored: 32 (2.13 per match)
- Top scorer: (Spain) Miguel Linares (3)

The Castilla y León Cup 2010–11 (Spanish: Copa Castilla y León 2010–11) is the second edition of this football trophy in its renewed version. It was organized before the final match of the previous cup, twice postponed because of Liga BBVA and Liga Adelante matchdays schedules.

== Teams participants ==
Team	TC	Province	League (Lv)
Real Valladolid	2	Valladolid	Liga Adelante (2)
Numancia	0	Soria	Liga Adelante (2)
UD Salamanca	1	Salamanca	Liga Adelante (2)
SD Ponferradina	1	León	Liga Adelante (2)
Palencia	0	Palencia	Segunda División B (3)
Mirandés	0	Burgos	Segunda División B (3)

Team	TC	Province	League (Lv)
Cultural Leonesa	4	León	Segunda División B (3)
Zamora	0	Zamora	Segunda División B (3)
Guijuelo	0	Salamanca	Segunda División B (3)
Burgos	0	Burgos	Tercera División (4)
Arandina	0	Burgos	Tercera División (4)
Real Ávila	0	Ávila	Tercera División (4)

== Group stage ==
=== Group A ===
	Pld	W	D	L	GF	GA	GD	Pts
Palencia (Q)	2	2	0	0	4	1	+3	6
Real Valladolid	2	1	0	1	1	2	–1	3
Arandina	2	0	0	2	1	3	–2	0

25 July 2010
19:30 CEST

Arandina	0 – 1	Real Valladolid
	(Report)	38' Sisi

El Montecillo, Aranda de Duero (Burgos)
Attendance: 2,000
Referee: Javier Rivero Guerra

30 July 2010
20:30 CEST

Palencia	2 – 0	Real Valladolid
De Paula 25'; Aitor 52', (yellow card); Durántez (yellow card)	(Report)	(yellow card) Sisi

Nueva Balastera, Palencia
Attendance: 1,500
Referee: Carlos Franco Galván

7 August 2010
19:30 CEST

Arandina	1 – 2	CF Palencia
Ayrton 21'; Marquitos (yellow card); De Miguel (yellow card); José Ángel (yellow card); Dela (yellow card); Adri (yellow card)	(Report)	52' Paulino; 54' Ale; (yellow card) Pelayo; (yellow card) Durántez; (yellow card) De Paula

El Montecillo, Aranda de Duero (Burgos)
Referee: David Dolz García

=== Group B ===
	Pld	W	D	L	GF	GA	GD	Pts
Burgos (Q)	2	1	1	0	3	1	+2	4
Numancia	2	1	1	0	3	2	+1	4
Mirandés	2	0	0	2	1	4	–3	0

31 July 2010
20:00 CEST

Mirandés	1 – 2	Numancia
Infante 68'; Wilfred (yellow card)	(Report)	35' Mario; 58' Vélez; (yellow card) Garmendia

Anduva, Miranda de Ebro (Burgos)
Attendance: 1,200
Referee: César Díez Cano

4 August 2010
20:00 CEST

Burgos	1 – 1	Numancia
Ramos 9'	(Report)	79' Dimas

El Plantío, Burgos
Attendance: 1,200
Referee: David Dolz García

11 August 2010
20:00 CEST

Burgos	2 – 0	Mirandés
Salamanca 36'; Sedano 52'	(Report)

El Plantío, Burgos
Attendance: 500
Referee: Javier Pérez Martín

=== Group C ===
	Pld	W	D	L	GF	GA	GD	Pts
Ponferradina (Q)	2	2	0	0	4	1	+3	6
Cultural Leonesa	2	0	1	1	0	1	–1	1
Zamora	2	0	1	1	1	3	–2	1

30 July 2010
20:00 CEST

Zamora	1 – 3	Ponferradina
Martín 2'	(Report)	20' Mayor; 41' De Paula; 56' Javi López

Ruta de la Plata, Zamora
Attendance: 700
Referee: Manuel Ángel Vaquero Girón

4 August 2010
20:30 CEST

Cultural Leonesa	0 – 1	Ponferradina
	(Report)	80' Cristian

Reino de León, León
Attendance: 2,500
Referee: Rubén Gómez González

7 August 2010
19:30 CEST

Zamora	0 – 0	Cultural Leonesa
	(Report)

Ruta de la Plata, Zamora

=== Group D ===
	Pld	W	D	L	GF	GA	GD	Pts
UD Salamanca (Q)	2	1	1	0	6	1	+5	4
Guijuelo	2	1	1	0	3	1	+2	4
Real Ávila	2	0	0	2	0	7	–7	0

4 August 2010
20:30 CEST

Real Ávila	0 – 5	UD Salamanca
		9', 54', 71' Linares; 14' Kike; 29' (pen.) Quique Martín

Adolfo Suárez Stadium, Ávila
Attendance: 400
Referee: Saúl Plaza Garcia

7 August 2010
20:30 CEST

Real Ávila	0 – 2	Guijuelo
		Pedrito; Vinuesa

Adolfo Suárez Stadium, Ávila
Attendance: 200
Referee: Saúl Plaza Garcia

12 August 2010
20:00 CEST

Guijuelo	1 – 1	UD Salamanca
Tejedor 81'	(Report)	27' Rosas; (red card) Linares

Municipal Ground, Guijuelo (Salamanca)
Attendance: 500
Referee: Jesús Rodríguez Cayetano

== Final round ==
Semi-finals
February 16, 2011– Burgos
Burgos	1
Ponferradina (p.s.o.)	1
October 6, 2010– Palencia
Palencia	0
UD Salamanca	1

Final
June 7, 2011– Ponferrada
SD Ponferradina	1 (6)
UD Salamanca	1 (5)

=== Semifinals ===
6 October 2010
20:30 CEST

Palencia	0 – 1	UD Salamanca
Saavedra (red card); Chupri (yellow card) 67'	(Report)	(yellow card) 24' García; 67' Expósito; (yellow card) 70' Yuste; (yellow card) 82' Castro

Nueva Balastera, Palencia
Attendance: 1,248
Referee: David Becerril Gómez

16 February 2011
19:00 CET

Burgos	1 – 1	Ponferradina
Espinosa 51'; Medrano (yellow card)	(Report)	23' Yuri; (yellow card) Tano; (yellow card) Jano
Penalties
Ramos (penalty missed); Espinosa (penalty missed); Erik (penalty scored); Herrero (penalty scored)	2 – 4	(penalty scored) De Paula; (penalty scored) Jano; (penalty scored) Máyor; (penalty scored) Ruiz

El Plantío, Burgos
Referee: David Dolz García

=== Final ===
The final match was originally scheduled for the festivity of Castilla y León (23 April). However, the match was postponed until both teams were available because the original date was reserved to one Liga Adelante matchday. After finishing the league season, with both finalists relegated to Segunda División B, the final was played at El Toralín on 7 June.

7 June 2011
20:30 CEST

SD Ponferradina	1 – 1	UD Salamanca
Ruiz 33'		7' Kike; (yellow card) Zamora; (yellow card) Perico
Penalties
Jano (penalty missed); Yuri (penalty scored); Jonathan Ruiz (penalty scored); Redondo (penalty scored); Luis Prieto (penalty scored); Cristian (penalty scored); Borja (penalty scored)	6 – 5	(penalty scored) Bedia; (penalty missed) Yuste; (penalty scored) Sito; (penalty scored) Sarmiento; (penalty scored) Zamora; (penalty scored) Hernández; (penalty missed) Coque

El Toralín, Ponferrada (León)
Attendance: 4,500
Referee: Javier Turienzo Álvarez

== See also ==
- Castilla y León Cup
- 2009–10 Castilla y León Cup
- 2010–11 Real Valladolid season
