= 2009–10 Castilla y León Cup =

2009–10 Copa Castilla y León
Tournament details
- Host country: Spain
- Dates: July 30, 2009 – Nov. 16, 2010
- Teams: 12
- Venues: 8 (in 8 host cities)

Final positions
- Champions: UD Salamanca (1st title)
- Runners-up: Real Valladolid

Tournament statistics
- Matches played: 18
- Goals scored: 52 (2.89 per match)
- Top scorer(s): (Spain) Azkorra (4) (Spain) Paulino (4)

The Castilla y León Cup 2009–10 (Spanish: Copa Castilla y León 2009–10) is the first edition of this football trophy in its renewed version after the regional championships celebrated between 1925 and 1931 and the 1985 summer trophy.

== Teams participants ==
- Real Valladolid (started at the semi-finals)
- Numancia
- UD Salamanca
- Cultural Leonesa
- Ponferradina
- Zamora
- Guijuelo
- Palencia
- Mirandés
- Burgos
- Arandina
- Atlético Bembibre
- Real Ávila (withdrew by financial problems)
- Gimnástica Segoviana (withdrew by financial problems)

== Financial problems ==
The economic situation of Real Ávila and Gimnástica Segoviana provoked their withdrew of the tournament in July. To refill again the tournament, Castilla y León Football Federation called Atlético Bembibre. The tournament has, at the end, twelve clubs, eleven of which took part in the group stage.

== Group stage ==
- All times are CEST

=== Group A ===
Team	Pld	W	D	L	GF	GA	GD	Pts
UD Salamanca	2	2	0	0	5	2	+3	6
Guijuelo	2	1	0	1	5	4	+1	3
Zamora	2	0	0	2	1	5	−4	0

August 4, 2009	Zamora	1–3	Guijuelo	Ruta de la Plata, Zamora
21:00	Íker Alegre 44' (pen.)	(Report)	36' Piojo; 55' Óscar Martín; 90+4' Juanfer	Attendance: 1,000; Referee: (Spain) Manuel Ángel Vaquero Girón

August 10, 2009	Zamora	0–2	UD Salamanca	Ruta de la Plata, Zamora
21:00			40' Akinsola; 81' Azkorra	Attendance: 1,200; Referee: (Spain) Luis Javier Alberca García

August 13, 2009	Guijuelo	2–3	UD Salamanca	Municipal de Guijuelo, Guijuelo (Salamanca)
20:00	Juanfer 48', 56'	(Report)	26' Chopi; 36' Salva Sevilla; 77' Hugo Leal	Attendance: 700; Referee: (Spain) Fernando Rodríguez Cayetano

=== Group B ===
Team	Pld	W	D	L	GF	GA	GD	Pts
Arandina	3	2	1	0	10	0	+10	7
Burgos	3	1	1	1	1	9	−8	4
Numancia	3	0	3	0	0	0	0	3
Mirandés	3	0	1	2	0	2	−2	1

August 1, 2009	Arandina	0–0	Numancia	El Montecillo, Aranda de Duero (Burgos)
19:00				Attendance: 900; Referee: (Spain) Roberto Martínez Ramos

August 1, 2009	Burgos	1–0	Mirandés	El Plantío, Burgos
20:00	Escudero 29'			Attendance: 1,000; Referee: (Spain) César Díez Cano

August 4, 2009	Arandina	9–0	Burgos	El Montecillo, Aranda de Duero (Burgos)
20:30	Alex 1'; Gustavo 6', 14'; Marcos 26'; Arce 37'; Bastida 40'; Ayrton 55', 76'; Saúl 74'	(Report)		Attendance: 150; Referee: (Spain) Javier Pérez Martín

August 5, 2009	Mirandés	0–0	Numancia	Anduva, Miranda de Ebro (Burgos)
19:00				Attendance: 1,000; Referee: (Spain) David Dolz García

August 8, 2009	Arandina	1–0	Mirandés	El Montecillo, Aranda de Duero (Burgos)
19:30	Gustavo 55'			Attendance: 200; Referee: (Spain) Álvaro Lavín Pérez

August 8, 2009	Burgos	0–0	Numancia	El Plantío, Burgos
20:00				Attendance: 600; Referee: (Spain) David Lavín Pérez

=== Group C ===
Team	Pld	W	D	L	GF	GA	GD	Pts
Palencia	3	3	0	0	7	1	+6	9
Ponferradina	3	2	0	1	7	4	+3	6
Cultural Leonesa	3	0	1	2	1	4	−3	1
Atlético Bembibre	3	0	1	2	2	8	−6	1

July 30, 2009	Palencia	2–0	Ponferradina	Nueva Balastera, Palencia
19:30	Paulino 49', 61' (pen.)			Attendance: 800; Referee: (Spain) Carlos Franco Galván

August 1, 2009	Atlético Bembibre	0–0	Cultural Leonesa	La Devesa, Bembibre (León)
20:00				Attendance: 200; Referee: (Spain) José Antonio Quindós Macías

August 5, 2009	Atlético Bembibre	1–4	Palencia	La Devesa, Bembibre (León)
20:00	Olano 49'	(Report)	2' Benjamín; 14' Paulino; 45+1' Agostinho; 68' (pen.) Chuchi	Attendance: 150; Referee: (Spain) Jorge Ateca Yáñez

August 8, 2009	Atlético Bembibre	1–4	Ponferradina	La Devesa, Bembibre (León)
20:00	Víctor Vega 59'		21', 64' Ivi Vales; 39' Víctor Salas; 61' Berodia	Attendance: 500; Referee: (Spain) José Antonio Quindós Macías

August 11, 2009	Palencia	1–0	Cultural Leonesa	Nueva Balastera, Palencia
20:00	Paulino 90+1' (pen.)			Attendance: 500; Referee: (Spain) Fernando Román Román

August 27, 2009	Ponferradina	3–1	Cultural Leonesa	Compostilla, Ponferrada (León)
19:00	Nacho 15'; Nino 33'; Álex 54'		44' Gonzalo González	Attendance: 300; Referee: (Spain) Luis García Iglesias

=== Final phase ===
==== Draw ====
Team No. 1	Score	Team No. 2
Winners Group C	vs.	Real Valladolid
Winners Group B	vs.	Winners Group A

Semi-finals
September 8, 2009– Palencia
Palencia	0
Real Valladolid	5
September 16, 2009– Aranda de Duero
Arandina	0
UD Salamanca	5

Final
November 16, 2010– Salamanca
UD Salamanca	2
Real Valladolid	1

==== Semi-finals ====
September 8, 2009
20:30

Palencia	0–5	Real Valladolid
Agostinho (yellow card)	(Report)	9', 24' Diego Costa; 46', 72' Bueno; 87' Canobbio

Nueva Balastera, Palencia
Attendance: 2,000
Referee: (Spain) Jorge Valdés Aller

September 16, 2009
18:15

Arandina	0–5	UD Salamanca
		14', 40', 52' Azkorra; 60' Laionel; 65' Linares

El Montecillo, Aranda de Duero (Burgos)
Attendance: 500
Referee: (Spain) David Becerril Gómez

==== Final ====
November 16, 2010
20:30 CET

UD Salamanca	2–1	Real Valladolid
Martín 42'; De la Nava (yellow card) 51'; García 60'; Ramos (yellow card) 83'		21', (yellow card) 87' Raúl Navas; (yellow card) 33' Lázaro

El Helmántico, Salamanca
Attendance: 5,400
Referee: (Spain) Rubén Gómez González

Castilla y León Cup
2009–10 Winners
UD Salamanca
1st Title
