= 1996–97 CP Mérida season =

CP Mérida
1996–97 season
- Manager: Sergije Krešić (until 21 February); Floro Garrido (interim, 22–23 February); Jorge D'Alessandro (from 24 February)
- Stadium: Estadio Romano
- Segunda División: 1st (promoted)
- Copa del Rey: Second round
- Top goalscorer: League: Quique Martín (15); All: Quique Martín (16)

The 1996–97 CP Mérida season was the club's 85th season in existence and the club's first season back in the second division of Spanish football.

== Competitions ==
=== Overview ===
Competition	First match	Last match	Starting round	Final position	Record							
Competition	First match	Last match	Starting round	Final position	Pld	W	D	L	GF	GA	GD	Win %
Segunda División	1 September 1996	14 June 1997	Matchday 1	Winners	38	21	9	8	57	35	+22	55.26
Copa del Rey	4 September 1996	27 November 1996	First round	Second round	4	3	0	1	9	7	+2	75.00
Total					42	24	9	9	66	42	+24	57.14

Source: Competitions

=== Segunda División ===
==== League table ====
Pos	Team	Pld	W	D	L	GF	GA	GD	Pts	Promotion or relegation
1	CP Mérida	38	21	9	8	57	35	+22	72	Promoted to Primera División
2	UD Salamanca	38	20	11	7	72	33	+39	71	Promoted to Primera División
3	RCD Mallorca	38	20	10	8	59	38	+21	70	Promotion playoff
4	Albacete	38	19	9	10	51	32	+19	66	
5	SD Eibar	38	17	15	6	44	26	+18	66	

==== Results summary ====
Overall								Home						Away					
Pld	W	D	L	GF	GA	GD	Pts	W	D	L	GF	GA	GD	W	D	L	GF	GA	GD
38	21	9	8	57	35	+22	72	14	4	1	41	16	+25	7	5	7	16	19	−3

Source: BDFutbol

==== Results by round ====
Round	1	2	3	4	5	6	7	8	9	10	11	12	13	14	15	16	17	18	19	20	21	22	23	24	25	26	27	28	29	30	31	32	33	34	35	36	37	38
Ground	H	A	H	A	H	A	H	A	H	A	H	A	H	A	H	A	H	A	H	A	H	A	H	A	H	A	H	A	H	A	H	A	H	A	H	A	H	A
Result	W	L	W	W	W	W	W	W	W	W	W	D	D	D	L	L	D	D	W	L	D	W	D	W	W	L	W	L	W	D	W	L	W	D	W	W	W	L
Position																																						

A = Away; H = Home; W = Win; D = Draw; L = Loss

==== Matches ====
1 September 1996 1	Mérida	4–0	Albacete	Mérida
				Stadium: Estadio Romano

8 September 1996 2	Ourense	2–0	Albacete	Ourense

15 September 1996 3	Mérida	4–0	Las Palmas	Mérida
				Stadium: Estadio Romano

21 September 1996 4	Écija	0–2	Mérida	Écija

29 September 1996 5	Mérida	2–1	Osasuna	Mérida
				Stadium: Estadio Romano

12 October 1996 6	Barcelona B	0–1	Mérida	Barcelona

20 October 1996 7	Mérida	1–0	Salamanca	Mérida
				Stadium: Estadio Romano

27 October 1996 8	Villarreal	0–1	Mérida	Villarreal

3 November 1996 9	Mérida	3–2	Atlético Madrid B	Mérida
				Stadium: Estadio Romano

10 November 1996 10	Badajoz	0–1	Mérida	Badajoz

17 November 1996 11	Mérida	2–1	Mallorca	Mérida
				Stadium: Estadio Romano

23 November 1996 12	Alavés	0–0	Mérida	Vitoria-Gasteiz

1 December 1996 13	Mérida	1–1	Levante	Mérida
				Stadium: Estadio Romano

7 December 1996 14	Eibar	2–2	Mérida	Eibar

19 December 1996 15	Mérida	0–2	Lleida	Mérida
				Stadium: Estadio Romano

22 December 1996 16	Toledo	1–0	Mérida	Toledo

5 January 1997 17	Mérida	3–3	Almería	Mérida
				Stadium: Estadio Romano

12 January 1997 18	Leganés	1–1	Mérida	Leganés

19 January 1997 19	Mérida	1–0	Real Madrid B	Mérida
				Stadium: Estadio Romano

26 January 1997 20	Albacete	1–0	Mérida	Albacete

2 February 1997 21	Mérida	0–0	Ourense	Mérida
				Stadium: Estadio Romano

9 February 1997 22	Las Palmas	1–2	Mérida	Las Palmas

15 February 1997 23	Mérida	1–1	Écija	Mérida
	Quique 89' (pen.)		Andrés 67'	Stadium: Estadio Romano; Referee: Luis María Contador Crespo

23 February 1997 24	Osasuna	0–1	Mérida	Pamplona

1 March 1997 25	Mérida	5–1	Barcelona B	Mérida
				Stadium: Estadio Romano

9 March 1997 26	Salamanca	1–0	Mérida	Salamanca

16 March 1997 27	Mérida	4–0	Villarreal	Mérida
				Stadium: Estadio Romano

23 March 1997 28	Atlético Madrid B	3–1	Mérida	Madrid

29 March 1997 29	Mérida	2–0	Badajoz	Mérida
				Stadium: Estadio Romano

6 April 1997 30	Mallorca	1–1	Mérida	Palma

12 April 1997 31	Mérida	3–2	Alavés	Mérida
				Stadium: Estadio Romano

20 April 1997 32	Levante	1–0	Mérida	Valencia

4 May 1997 33	Mérida	2–1	Eibar	Mérida
				Stadium: Estadio Romano

11 May 1997 34	Lleida	0–0	Mérida	Lleida

17 May 1997 35	Mérida	3–1	Toledo	Mérida
				Stadium: Estadio Romano

25 May 1997 36	Almería	1–3	Mérida	Almería

1 June 1997 37	Mérida	2–0	Leganés	Mérida
				Stadium: Estadio Romano

14 June 1997 38	Real Madrid B	4–0	Mérida	Madrid

== Statistics ==
=== Goalscorers ===
Rank	Pos	No.	Nat.	Player	Segunda División	Copa del Rey	Total
1	FW	11	(Spain)	Quique Martín	15	1	16
2	FW	16	(Spain)	Manuel Canabal	10	1	11
3	FW	19	(Poland)	Jerzy Podbrożny	9	0	9
4	FW	17	(Brazil)	José Sinval	6	0	6
Totals					40	2	42
