= Nivaldo Batista =

Nivaldo Batista may refer to:

- Nivaldo Batista Santana (born 1980), Brazilian football player
- Nivaldo Batista Lima (born 1989), Brazilian singer known as Gusttavo Lima
