= Piojo (footballer, born 1989) =

Spanish footballer

Personal information
- Full name: Jesús Hernández de la Torre
- Date of birth: 29 June 1989 (age 37)
- Place of birth: Salamanca, Spain
- Height: 1.71 m (5 ft 7 in)
- Position: Winger

Youth career
- Salamanca

Senior career*
Years	Team	Apps	(Gls)
2007–2008	Salamanca B	21	(4)
2007–2010	Salamanca	1	(0)
2008–2009	→ Barakaldo (loan)	11	(0)
2009–2010	→ Guijuelo (loan)	11	(0)
2010–2011	Guijuelo	6	(0)
2011–2012	Salamanca B	26	(2)
2012–2013	Salamanca	48	(4)
2013–2014	Huesca	15	(0)
2014	Gimnàstic	20	(1)
2014–2015	UCAM Murcia	29	(0)
2015–2017	Guijuelo	57	(2)
2017–2020	Unionistas	96	(3)
2020–2021	Palencia	17	(4)
2021–2023	Guijuelo	58	(0)
- * Club domestic league appearances and goals as of 27 May 2023

Jesús Hernández de La Torre (born 29 June 1989), commonly known as Piojo, is a Spanish footballer who plays as a winger.

== Football career ==
Born in Salamanca, Castile and León, Piojo was a product of hometown UD Salamanca's youth system, and made senior debuts with the reserves in the 2007–08 season, in the Tercera División. On 28 October 2007 he made his professional debut, playing the last 5 minutes of a 2–2 away draw against SD Eibar in the Segunda División.

On 28 August of the following year Piojo was loaned to Barakaldo CF of the Segunda División B. On 21 August 2009 he moved to fellow league team CD Guijuelo, also in a temporary deal, and signed permanently with the latter in September 2010.

On 31 August 2011 Piojo returned to Salamanca B; he was promoted to the main squad halfway through the campaign. He subsequently resumed his career in the third level with SD Huesca, Gimnàstic de Tarragona, UCAM Murcia CF and Guijuelo.
