= Vyacheslav Pidnebennoy =

Ukrainian footballer

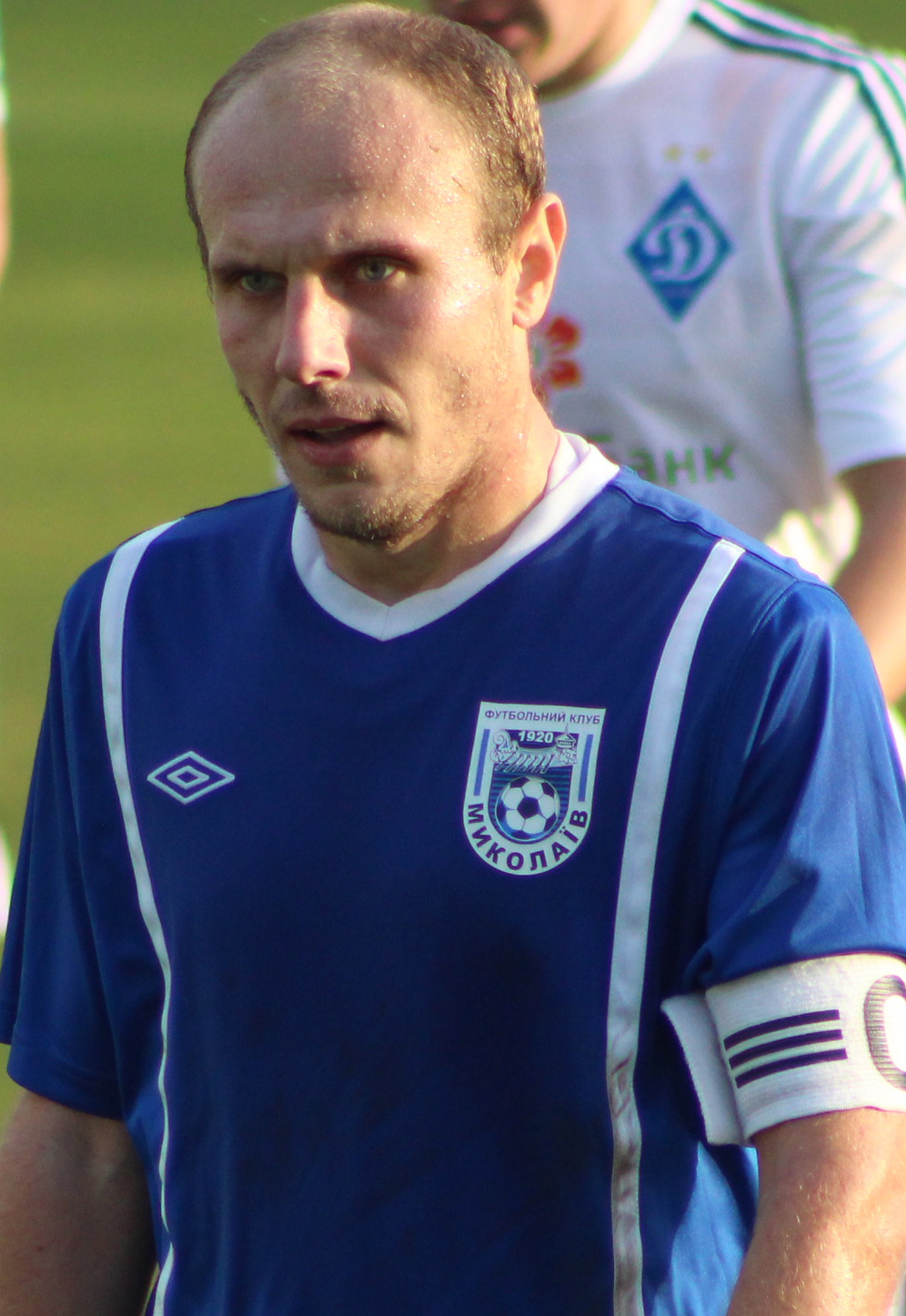

Personal information
- Full name: Vyacheslav Hryhorovych Pidnebennoy
- Date of birth: 3 May 1988 (age 38)
- Place of birth: Zhdanov, Soviet Union (now Ukraine)
- Height: 1.86 m (6 ft 1 in)
- Position: Central midfielder

Team information
- Current team: Palencia

Youth career
- 2001–2003: Illichivets Mariupol
- 2004–2005: Shakhtar Donetsk

Senior career*
Years	Team	Apps	(Gls)
2005–2008	Shakhtar Donetsk	0	(0)
2005	→ Shakhtar-2 Donetsk	1	(0)
2005–2008	→ Shakhtar-3 Donetsk	44	(8)
2008–2009	Stal Alchevsk	21	(2)
2009–2013	Olimpik Donetsk	70	(10)
2012–2013	→ Avanhard Kramatorsk (loan)	42	(2)
2014	Poltava	8	(0)
2014	Mykolaiv	16	(4)
2015	Sumy	11	(2)
2015	Dacia Chișinău	7	(2)
2016–2017	Naftovyk-Ukrnafta Okhtyrka	61	(3)
2018–2019	Inhulets Petrove	33	(4)
2019–2022	Alians Lypova Dolyna	62	(6)
2022–	Palencia	0	(0)
- * Club domestic league appearances and goals as of 14 July 2022

Vyacheslav Hryhorovych Pidnebennoy (Ukrainian: В'ячеслав Григорович Піднебенной; born 3 May 1988) is a Ukrainian professional footballer who plays as a central midfielder for Spanish club Palencia.
