= Floro Garrido =

Spanish footballer and manager

Personal information
- Full name: Florencio Garrido Ajenjo
- Date of birth: 12 October 1952
- Place of birth: Villanueva de Alcardete, Spain
- Date of death: January 9, 2012 (aged 59)
- Place of death: Almería, Spain
- Height: 1.70 m (5 ft 7 in)
- Position: Midfielder

Youth career
- Salesianos
- 1966–1971: Real Madrid

Senior career*
Years	Team	Apps	(Gls)
1971–1974	Real Madrid B		
1971–1972	→ Plus Ultra (loan)		
1972	→ Cádiz (loan)	8	(0)
1974–1978	Burgos	102	(11)
1978–1983	Levante	106	(9)

Managerial career
- 1983–1986: Levante B
- 1986: Levante
- 1986–1988: Alaquàs
- 1988–1990: Olímpic Xàtiva
- 1990–1993: Mármol Macael
- 1993: Marbella
- 1995: Poli Almería
- 1997: Mérida
- 1997: Castellón
- 1997–1998: Guadix
- 1998: Mineros Guayana
- 1998: Almería
- 1999–2000: SS Reyes
- 2005–2006: Huercalense
- 2006–2009: Vera
- 2009: Ronda
- 2009–2010: Villarrubia
- 2011: Villarrubia
- * Club domestic league appearances and goals

Florencio 'Floro' Garrido Ajenjo (12 October 1952 – 9 January 2012) was a Spanish retired footballer who played as a midfielder, and a current manager.

Garrido had his career mainly associated with Burgos CF and Levante UD, appearing in the three main levels of Spanish football. He amassed a total of 168 appearances in Segunda División, scoring 17 goals, and added 47/3 in La Liga.

== Club career ==
Born in Villanueva de Alcardete, Toledo, Castile-La Mancha, Garrido joined Real Madrid's youth setup in 1966, aged 13. He made his debuts as a senior while on loan at CD Plus Ultra in 1971, in Tercera División.

In March 1972 Garrido moved to Segunda División's Cádiz CF, also in a temporary deal until the end of the campaign. He made his debut as a professional on 26 March, playing the full 90 minutes in a 0–2 away loss against Real Oviedo.

In 1974, after two years at Real Madrid's reserve team, Garrido joined Burgos CF also in the second level. With the Castile and León he achieved promotion to La Liga in 1975–76, despite featuring sparingly; he made his debut in the latter competition on 5 September 1976, starting in a 1–2 home loss against RCD Espanyol.

Garrido left Burgos in 1978 and signed for Levante UD, in the third division. He retired with the club in 1983, aged 30.

== Managerial career ==
Immediately after retiring, Garrido was an assistant manager at his last club Levante, being manager of the reserves, and also an interim manager of the main squad in 1986. He later had spells at CF Alaquàs, CD Olímpic de Xàtiva and Mármol Macael CD before being appointed UD Marbella manager in 1993.

Garrido subsequently resumed his managerial career in the lower levels, coaching mainly CP Mérida, CD Castellón, UD Almería, UD San Sebastián de los Reyes and CD Vera.

During his time as a manager, Garrido suffered with a serious hip injury which took him out of any duties for two years. He subsequently moved to Huércal-Overa after his injury, and died on 9 January 2012 in Almería, after having a multiple organ failure due to his diabetes.
