= Alberto Marcos =

Spanish retired footballer (born 1974)

Personal information
- Full name: Alberto Marcos Rey
- Date of birth: 15 February 1974 (age 52)
- Place of birth: Camarma de Esteruelas, Spain
- Height: 1.73 m (5 ft 8 in)
- Position: Left-back

Youth career
- Real Madrid

Senior career*
Years	Team	Apps	(Gls)
1993	Real Madrid C	4	(0)
1993–1995	Real Madrid B	58	(0)
1994–1995	Real Madrid	7	(0)
1995–2010	Valladolid	438	(4)
2010–2011	Huesca	33	(0)
Total		540	(4)

International career
1994–1995	Spain U21	3	(0)
- * Club domestic league appearances and goals

Alberto Marcos Rey (born 15 February 1974) is a Spanish former professional footballer who played as a left-back.

After not being able to establish himself at Real Madrid, he went on to spend 15 seasons with Valladolid, experiencing two relegations and one promotion and appearing in nearly 500 competitive matches.

== Club career ==
Marcos was born in Camarma de Esteruelas, Community of Madrid. After emerging through the ranks of Real Madrid, he played three La Liga matches for the 1995 national champions, his debut coming on 17 April 1994 in a 1–0 away win over Sevilla FC. In a subsequent game against FC Barcelona, he effectively marked Bulgarian international Hristo Stoichkov, but could never break into the first team.

In the 1995–96 season, Marcos signed for Real Valladolid, going on to be a defensive mainstay for over a decade and eventually gaining team captaincy. From 1997 to 2002 he only missed a total of eight league fixtures, and became, late in 2008–09, the player with most overall matches for the club. Two seasons earlier, as the Castile and León side returned to the top tier after a two-year absence, he had contributed 29 matches, scoring once.

Marcos suffered various injuries the following campaign, and appeared in only 21 league games whilst completing just 12, his third worst input in 15 years with Valladolid. In July 2010, at 36 – and following the team's relegation – he decided to leave the club, holding the records of more league games played (438), more official matches (471) and more games (361) and minutes (31.610) in the top flight.

Later that month, Marcos joined SD Huesca of the Segunda División, reuniting with former Valladolid coach Onésimo Sánchez. He was the undisputed starter in his position during the season as the Aragonese retained their league status, and retired from football in June 2011 to become Valladolid's director of football.

== Honours ==
Real Madrid

- La Liga: 1994–95

Valladolid

- Segunda División: 2006–07
