= Chupri =

Spanish footballer

Personal information
- Full name: Alberto Sánchez Martínez
- Date of birth: 8 October 1980 (age 46)
- Place of birth: Herrera de Pisuerga, Spain
- Height: 1.80 m (5 ft 11 in)
- Position: Defender

Senior career*
Years	Team	Apps	(Gls)
2000–2001	Salamanca B		
2001–2005	Salamanca	29	(1)
2003–2004	→ Real Unión (loan)	32	(2)
2005–2007	Ponferradina	50	(2)
2007–2008	Mérida	34	(0)
2008–2009	Lorca Deportiva	22	(0)
2009–2012	Palencia	99	(3)
2013–2015	Palencia Balompié	14	(0)
Total		280	(8)
- * Club domestic league appearances and goals

Alberto Sánchez Martínez (born 8 October 1980), known as Chupri, is a Spanish retired footballer who played as a right back.
