= Kevin Manzano =

Spanish footballer (born 1999)

Personal information
- Full name: Kevin Manzano Cortés
- Date of birth: 25 February 1999 (age 27)
- Place of birth: Madrid, Spain
- Height: 1.75 m (5 ft 9 in)
- Position: Winger

Team information
- Current team: Águilas
- Number: 22

Youth career
- San Fernando

Senior career*
Years	Team	Apps	(Gls)
2017–2018	San Fernando	22	(8)
2018–2019	Getafe B	19	(1)
2019	Albacete B	10	(0)
2019–2020	San Fernando	16	(5)
2020–2021	Rayo Vallecano B	26	(3)
2021–2022	Fuenlabrada Promesas	36	(8)
2021–2022	Fuenlabrada	2	(0)
2022–2023	Las Rozas	28	(4)
2023–2024	Arandina	30	(6)
2024–2025	Rayo Majadahonda	29	(8)
2025–	Águilas	27	(0)
- * Club domestic league appearances and goals as of 7 May 2026

Kevin Manzano Cortés (born 25 February 1999) is a Spanish professional footballer who plays as a right winger for Segunda Federación club Águilas.

== Club career ==
A CD San Fernando de Henares youth graduate, Madrid-born Manzano made his first-team debut for the club on 12 October 2017, playing the last 14 minutes and scoring the equalizer in a 1–1 Tercera División home draw against AD Alcorcón B. He went on to feature regularly during the campaign, scoring eight goals in 22 appearances as his side finished in an impressive sixth position.

On 6 August 2018, Manzano moved to Getafe CF and was assigned to the reserves also in the fourth division. The following 19 July, he joined another reserve team, Atlético Albacete in the same category, but left the club on 14 November 2019 and subsequently returned to his first side San Fernando.

On 30 September 2020, Manzano signed for Rayo Vallecano's B-team, still in division four. He left on 29 July of the following year and joined CF Fuenlabrada, spending the pre-season with the main squad but being initially assigned to the reserves in Tercera División RFEF.

Manzano made his first-team debut for Fuenla on 14 December 2021, starting in a 0–0 away draw (5–4 penalty win) against UD San Sebastián de los Reyes, in the season's Copa del Rey. He made his professional debut on 2 January 2022, coming on as a late substitute for Álex Mula in a 1–2 home loss against UD Ibiza in the Segunda División.
