= Nauzet Alemán =

Spanish footballer

Nauzet
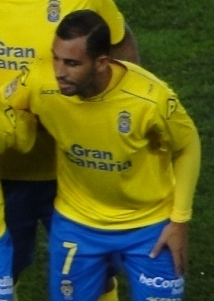
- Nauzet with Las Palmas in 2015

Personal information
- Full name: Nauzet Alemán Viera
- Date of birth: 25 February 1985 (age 41)
- Place of birth: Las Palmas, Spain
- Height: 1.78 m (5 ft 10 in)
- Position: Midfielder

Youth career
- Las Palmas

Senior career*
Years	Team	Apps	(Gls)
2003–2004	Las Palmas B		
2003–2009	Las Palmas	145	(15)
2009–2012	Valladolid	90	(22)
2012–2016	Las Palmas	101	(19)
2017	Almería	7	(0)
2018–2023	Arucas	63	(4)
Total		406	(60)

International career
2004	Spain U19	1	(0)
- * Club domestic league appearances and goals

Nauzet Alemán Viera (born 25 February 1985), known simply as Nauzet, is a Spanish former professional footballer who played mainly as a right midfielder.

He spent most of his career with Las Palmas, playing 273 competitive games and scoring 40 goals. In La Liga, he also represented Valladolid.

== Club career ==
=== Las Palmas ===
Born in Las Palmas, Canary Islands, Nauzet made his debut with his hometown club UD Las Palmas during 2003–04's Segunda División, playing ten matches in an eventual relegation. He subsequently became first-choice.

Nauzet was instrumental in the 2005–06 season, as his team once again returned to the second division: in the last minutes of a match at Real Sociedad B, in the first round of the promotion play-offs, he scored a goal that relegated the Basques. Additionally, in the decisive tie against CD Linares, he set up Marcos Márquez for the game's only goal.

=== Valladolid ===
In late June 2009, not having renewed his contract with Las Palmas, Nauzet signed for La Liga's Real Valladolid, agreeing to a three-year deal. He made his league debut on 30 August as a starter at UD Almería, being sacrificed in the 15th minute after defender Nivaldo was sent off (eventual 0–0 draw). He then proceeded to net four times in the next six fixtures, including twice in a 4–0 home win over Deportivo de La Coruña on 25 October, but the Castile and León side was relegated at the season's end.

On 8 September 2011, Nauzet scored four goals in a 6–0 home victory against Gimnàstic de Tarragona in the second round of the Copa del Rey.

=== Return to Las Palmas ===
Nauzet returned to the Estadio Gran Canaria in summer 2012. He achieved top-flight promotion at the end of the 2014–15 campaign, scoring ten goals in all competitions but missing the final months due to a collarbone injury.

In February 2016, after being assaulted in a nightclub, Nauzet was ousted from the squad for 15 days. He terminated his contract with Las Palmas on 7 July, joining second-tier Almería on 13 August 2017 but leaving at his own request on 12 December.

On 1 January 2018, Nauzet announced his retirement at the age of 32. Shortly after, however, he returned with amateurs Arucas CF in his native region.
