= Paulino Martínez (footballer) =

Spanish footballer

Paulino
Personal information
- Full name: Paulino Martínez Soria
- Date of birth: 14 August 1973 (age 53)
- Place of birth: Albacete, Spain
- Height: 1.83 m (6 ft 0 in)
- Position: Striker

Youth career
- 1982–1992: Albacete

Senior career*
Years	Team	Apps	(Gls)
1992	Melilla	4	(0)
1992–1993	Albacete B	40	(20)
1993–1994	Águilas	16	(10)
1994–1995	Yeclano	17	(10)
1995	Atlético Madrid B	11	(2)
1995	Atlético Madrid	3	(0)
1995–1996	Marbella	15	(1)
1996–1997	Manchego	24	(8)
1997–1998	Atlético Madrid B	16	(3)
1998–1999	Ourense	19	(3)
1999	Albacete B	4	(2)
1999–2000	Melilla	29	(10)
2000–2001	Ceuta	36	(7)
2001–2003	Logroñés	67	(24)
2003–2005	Cultural Leonesa	91	(45)
2006–2007	Universidad LP	55	(13)
2007–2008	Portuense	28	(5)
2008–2011	CF Palencia	87	(39)
2011–2013	Villanovense	65	(11)
Total		627	(213)

Managerial career
- 2015–2017: Atlético Astorga
- 2021–2022: Palencia CF
- * Club domestic league appearances and goals

Paulino Martínez Soria (born 14 August 1973), known simply as Paulino, is a Spanish former footballer who played as a striker, currently a manager.

He played for 14 clubs across four levels of Spanish football in his career, mainly in the Segunda División B.

== Playing career ==
Paulino was born in Albacete, Castilla–La Mancha. After making his professional debut with UD Melilla, he went on to represent Albacete Balompié (two stints with the reserves), Águilas CF, Yeclano CF, Atlético Madrid – mainly registered with the B side – Átlético Marbella, CD Manchego, CD Ourense, UD Melilla, AD Ceuta, CD Logroñés, Cultural y Deportiva Leonesa, Universidad de Las Palmas CF, Racing Club Portuense, CF Palencia and CF Villanovense.

In the 1994–95 season, Paulino appeared in five first-team matches with Atlético, totalling 58 minutes in La Liga. His debut in the competition took place on 5 March 1995, as a late substitute in a 1–0 away win against Real Valladolid.

Paulino retired in June 2013 at age 39, after two seasons in the Segunda División B with Villanovense, suffering relegation in his second. He amassed competition totals of 472 games and 141 goals, playoff appearances notwithstanding.

== Coaching career ==
In November 2015, Paulino was appointed at third-tier side Atlético Astorga FC, being relegated at the end of that campaign. On 15 March 2017, he resigned.

Paulino became manager of Palencia CF in the newly created Tercera División RFEF on 28 October 2021.
