= Agostinho (footballer) =

Portuguese footballer

Joaquim Agostinho
Personal information
- Full name: Joaquim Agostinho da Silva Ribeiro
- Date of birth: 15 September 1975 (age 51)
- Place of birth: Paços de Ferreira, Portugal
- Height: 1.78 m (5 ft 10 in)
- Position: Winger

Youth career
- 1986–1990: Paços Ferreira
- 1990–1993: Vitória Guimarães

Senior career*
Years	Team	Apps	(Gls)
1993–1995	Vitória Guimarães	27	(1)
1995–1996	Real Madrid B	2	(1)
1996	→ Sevilla (loan)	0	(0)
1996–1997	Salamanca	19	(1)
1997–1998	Las Palmas	36	(7)
1998–2002	Málaga	93	(8)
2001–2002	→ Paris Saint-Germain (loan)	4	(0)
2002–2003	Moreirense	24	(1)
2003–2004	Poli Ejido	32	(1)
2004–2005	Felgueiras	30	(7)
2005–2007	Rio Ave	13	(1)
2007–2008	Valdevez	30	(0)
2008–2010	Palencia	70	(6)
Total		379	(34)

International career
1995–1996	Portugal U20	13	(4)
1996–1997	Portugal U21	7	(0)
Medal record
Men's football
Representing Portugal
FIFA U-20 World Cup
Third place	1995 Qatar
- * Club domestic league appearances and goals

Joaquim Agostinho da Silva Ribeiro (born 15 September 1975 in Paços de Ferreira), known as Agostinho, is a Portuguese retired footballer who played as a winger.

He spent most of his professional career in Spain, playing 182 matches (with 18 goals) in the two major levels. In his country, without really settling anywhere, he represented five clubs, totalling only 63 appearances in the Primeira Liga.

== Club career ==
After impressing as a youngster at Vitória Sport Clube in Guimarães, Agostinho moved abroad aged 20, but his first experience would be a very unhappy one, only appearing twice for Real Madrid Castilla and Sevilla FC combined. He would spend the following three seasons in the Spanish second division, consecutively with UD Salamanca, UD Las Palmas and Málaga CF; with the latter, in 1998–99, he teamed up with compatriot Edgar (also newly signed and also arrived from Real Madrid) to propel the Andalusians to La Liga, contributing with 38 matches and three goals.

Agostinho continued to appear significantly for Málaga in the following years, but also had an unassuming loan spell in France with Paris Saint-Germain FC, after which he was released in June 2002. His career was somewhat unnoticeable from then onwards, as he played mainly in Spain's and Portugal's second levels or with modest teams in the top flight, consecutively representing Moreirense FC, Polideportivo Ejido, F.C. Felgueiras and Rio Ave FC. He only played 14 competitive games in two full campaigns with the latter, and was released at the age of 32.

Agostinho then moved to the Portuguese third division with C.A. Valdevez, after which he again returned to Spain, joining CF Palencia in the fourth tier and helping it promote in his debut season. He left the club in June 2010 and retired shortly after, at nearly 35.
