= Alejandro Zamora =

Spanish footballer

Personal information
- Full name: Alejandro Zamora Barbero
- Date of birth: 22 April 1984 (age 42)
- Place of birth: Madrid, Spain
- Height: 1.85 m (6 ft 1 in)
- Position: Centre-back

Youth career
- Real Madrid

Senior career*
Years	Team	Apps	(Gls)
2003–2006	Real Madrid C	0	(0)
2005–2006	→ Oviedo (loan)	19	(0)
2006–2009	Betis B	107	(12)
2007	Betis	1	(0)
2009–2011	Salamanca	48	(0)
2011–2012	Recreativo	12	(0)
2013	Castellón	5	(0)
2014–2015	Cacereño	9	(0)
2015	Guadalajara	13	(0)
2015–2016	Mérida	35	(0)
2016	Hospitalet	15	(0)
2017	Extremadura	18	(0)
2017–2018	San Fernando	33	(1)
2019	Peña Deportiva	12	(0)
Total		327	(13)
- * Club domestic league appearances and goals

Alejandro Zamora Barbero (born 22 April 1984) is a Spanish former professional footballer who played mainly as a central defender.

He spent the vast majority of his career in the Segunda División B, playing more than 200 matches for eight clubs. His Segunda División input consisted of 60 appearances over three seasons (with Salamanca and Recreativo), and he added one in La Liga for Betis.

== Club career ==
Born in Madrid, Zamora played youth football with local Real Madrid, but only represented the C team as a senior, also being loaned to Real Oviedo during his spell. He signed with Real Betis in summer 2006, being all but associated with the reserves for three full seasons. On 2 December 2007, he played his only La Liga game with the main squad, featuring the full 90 minutes in a 0–2 home loss against Atlético Madrid which was also manager Héctor Cúper's last match on the bench.

In June 2009, Zamora signed for UD Salamanca on a two-year contract. Two years later, having suffered relegation, he joined fellow second-division club Recreativo de Huelva, making his competitive debut on 7 September by scoring an own goal in the 0–2 home defeat to Elche CF in the second round of the Copa del Rey. He only totalled 875 minutes in the league, also being sent off against AD Alcorcón for a late tackle on Quini in the 56th minute of an eventual 2–1 loss.

Afterwards, Zamora moved to the lower leagues, representing CD Castellón (Tercera División), CP Cacereño– a few months after arriving, he hinted of leaving– and CD Guadalajara. On 30 July 2015, he moved to Mérida AD still in the third tier, making his official debut on 22 August in a 1–0 away win over his former team Betis B.

Zamora remained in the third and fourth divisions until his retirement, representing CE L'Hospitalet, Extremadura UD, San Fernando CD and SCR Peña Deportiva.

== Career statistics ==
As of 15 May 2016

Club	Season	League			Cup		Other		Total	
Club	Season	Division	Apps	Goals	Apps	Goals	Apps	Goals	Apps	Goals
Oviedo	2005–06	Segunda División B	19	0	1	0	—		20	0
Betis B	2007–08	Segunda División B	34	3	—		—		34	3
Betis B	2008–09	Segunda División B	36	4	—		—		36	4
Betis B	Total		70	7	—		—		70	7
Betis	2007–08	La Liga	1	0	1	0	—		2	0
Salamanca	2009–10	Segunda División	19	0	4	0	—		23	0
Salamanca	2010–11	Segunda División	29	0	1	0	—		30	0
Salamanca	Total		48	0	5	0	—		53	0
Recreativo	2011–12	Segunda División	12	0	1	0	—		13	0
Cacereño	2014–15	Segunda División B	9	0	0	0	—		9	0
Guadalajara	2014–15	Segunda División B	13	0	0	0	2 (Note: Appearances in Segunda División B play-offs)	0	15	0
Mérida	2015–16	Segunda División B	35	0	0	0	—		35	0
Career total			207	7	8	0	2	0	217	7
