= Asier Arranz =

Spanish footballer (born 1987)

Asier
Personal information
- Full name: Asier Arranz Martín
- Date of birth: 28 March 1987 (age 39)
- Place of birth: Cuéllar, Spain
- Height: 1.76 m (5 ft 9 in)
- Position: Midfielder

Youth career
- Valladolid

Senior career*
Years	Team	Apps	(Gls)
2005–2006	Valladolid B	36	(3)
2006–2010	Valladolid	17	(0)
2007–2008	→ Alavés (loan)	6	(0)
2008–2009	→ Xerez (loan)	12	(0)
2010–2012	Numancia	10	(1)
2010	→ Pontevedra (loan)	8	(0)
2011	→ Teruel (loan)	12	(2)
2011–2012	→ Sestao (loan)	19	(2)
2012–2014	Gimnástica Segoviana	60	(15)
2014–2015	Atlético Astorga	32	(0)
2015–2017	Palencia	71	(1)
2017–2020	Gimnástica Segoviana	77	(10)
2020	Alki Oroklini	6	(0)
2020–2021	KTP	36	(3)
2022	Cristo Atlético	9	(0)
Total		411	(37)
- * Club domestic league appearances and goals

Asier Arranz Martín (born 28 March 1987), known simply as Asier, is a Spanish former professional footballer who played as a left midfielder.

== Club career ==
Asier was born in Cuéllar, Province of Segovia, Castile and León. After emerging through Real Valladolid's youth ranks, he played 16 Segunda División games for the first team in the 2006–07 season as they returned to La Liga after a three-year hiatus.

Subsequently, Asier served two more loan spells in the second division, appearing very little for Deportivo Alavés and Xerez CD (the latter also promoted, but the player only took the pitch on 12 occasions, one match complete). After having featured only once for Valladolid in the first half of the 2009–10 campaign, in a rare start, at RCD Mallorca – but in a 3–0 loss– he was finally released in late January 2010, returning to the second tier with CD Numancia by signing until the end of the season and two more.

From 2010 onwards, Asier resumed his career in the Segunda División B and Tercera División, with Pontevedra CF, CD Teruel, Sestao River Club, Gimnástica Segoviana CF (two spells), Atlético Astorga FC and CD Palencia Balompié. He moved abroad at the age of 33, representing teams in Cyprus and Finland and achieving promotion to the Veikkausliiga with Kotkan Työväen Palloilijat.
