= Jonathan Sesma =

Spanish footballer

Personal information
- Full name: Jonathan Sesma González
- Date of birth: 14 November 1978 (age 47)
- Place of birth: Las Palmas, Spain
- Height: 1.75 m (5 ft 9 in)
- Position: Winger

Senior career*
| Years | Team | Apps | (Gls) |
| 1997–1998 | Corralejo | 38 | (10) |
| 1998–2001 | Universidad LP | 75 | (23) |
| 1999–2000 | → Mallorca B (loan) | 36 | (3) |
| 2001–2003 | Córdoba | 13 | (1) |
| 2002 | → Ceuta (loan) | 13 | (2) |
| 2002–2003 | → Universidad LP (loan) | 34 | (20) |
| 2003–2007 | Cádiz | 157 | (40) |
| 2007–2010 | Valladolid | 83 | (12) |
| 2010–2011 | Córdoba | 22 | (2) |
| 2011 | Asteras Tripolis | 3 | (0) |
| 2012 | Alcalá | 11 | (2) |
| 2012–2013 | Orihuela | 17 | (5) |
| 2014 | Huesca | 10 | (1) |
| 2014–2015 | Marino | 26 | (6) |
| 2015–2016 | El Cotillo | 31 | (12) |
| 2016–2018 | Las Zocas | 5 | (3) |
| 2018–2019 | Marino | | |
| 2019–2020 | Ibarra | 9 | (3) |
| 2020–2021 | Unión Puerto | | |
| Total | | 583+ | (145+) |
- * Club domestic league appearances and goals

Jonathan Sesma González (born 14 November 1978) is a Spanish former professional footballer who played as a left winger.

He amassed Segunda División totals of 196 matches and 45 goals over six seasons, in representation of Universidad Las Palmas, Córdoba and Cádiz. He added 119 appearances and 19 goals in La Liga, with Cádiz and Valladolid.

== Career ==
Sesma was born in Las Palmas, Canary Islands. He spent his early career in the Segunda División B – with the exception of the 2000–01 season in the Segunda División, with Universidad de Las Palmas CF, suffering relegation – appearing for CD Corralejo and RCD Mallorca's B team.

In the summer of 2001, Sesma joined Córdoba CF in the second tier, featuring rarely over the course of two seasons and also being loaned to two clubs in the third tier, former employers Universidad and AD Ceuta. Released in 2003, he signed for Cádiz CF with which he was an instant hit, totalling 24 goals in his first two years and achieving promotion to La Liga in his second.

Still with Cádiz, Sesma made his top-flight debut on 28 August 2005 in a 1–2 home loss against Real Madrid. He continued to feature prominently, scoring seven times in 36 games but eventually being relegated at the end of the campaign as second-bottom.

On 14 August 2007, Sesma joined Real Valladolid, recently returned to the main division. On 22 November 2008, he scored a brace in a 3–0 away win over Villarreal CF, with all three goals coming before half-time.

Sesma suffered from various physical problems during 2009–10, playing 1,700 minutes less than the previous season and only scoring one goal. Also, the Castile and León side was relegated and his three-year contract was not renewed.

In early August 2010, aged 31, Sesma signed a one-year deal with his former club Córdoba. He had his first abroad experience in the following campaign, joining nine compatriots at Asteras Tripolis F.C. in the Super League Greece.

Sesma was released in the 2012 January transfer window, going on to compete in his country's lower leagues until his retirement.

== Honours ==
Cádiz

- Segunda División: 2004–05
