= Héctor Font =

Spanish footballer

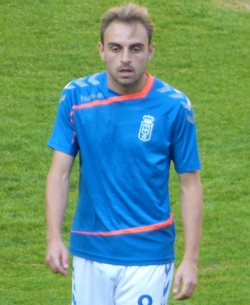
- Font with Oviedo in 2015

Personal information
- Full name: Héctor Font Romero
- Date of birth: 15 June 1984 (age 42)
- Place of birth: Villarreal, Spain
- Height: 1.71 m (5 ft 7 in)
- Position: Attacking midfielder

Youth career
- Villarreal

Senior career*
Years	Team	Apps	(Gls)
2002–2003	Villarreal B	22	(10)
2003–2006	Villarreal	56	(3)
2003–2004	→ Ciudad Murcia (loan)	38	(2)
2006–2009	Osasuna	69	(3)
2009–2011	Valladolid	10	(0)
2010–2011	→ Xerez (loan)	29	(1)
2011–2012	Recreativo	2	(0)
2012	Cartagena	17	(0)
2012–2013	Lugo	24	(0)
2013–2014	Hércules	16	(0)
2014–2016	Oviedo	46	(0)
Total		329	(19)

International career
2000	Spain U16	1	(0)
2004–2006	Spain U21	8	(2)
- * Club domestic league appearances and goals

Héctor Font Romero (born 15 June 1984) is a Spanish former professional footballer who played as an attacking midfielder.

He appeared in 274 professional league matches in his career, split nearly exactly between La Liga (135) and Segunda División (139), representing Villarreal, Osasuna and Valladolid in the former competition and seven teams in the latter.

== Club career ==
Born in Villarreal, Province of Castellón, Valencian Community, Font started his career with his hometown club Villarreal CF and appeared for the first team in the last two La Liga games in 2002–03, against RCD Espanyol and Real Betis. He spent the following season in the Segunda División, on loan to Ciudad de Murcia.

Font subsequently returned to Villarreal where, although never an undisputed starter, he managed to feature regularly. On 24 October 2004, he scored twice in a 4–0 home win against CD Numancia. In the European front, he made 11 appearances (two goals) in the UEFA Cup as they reached the last eight, adding four matches in next campaign's UEFA Champions League for an eventual place in the semi-finals.

Deemed surplus to requirements, Font signed a three-year contract with CA Osasuna in July 2006. He made his official debut for the Navarrese side on 9 September in a 3–0 loss at FC Barcelona, and would become first-choice in his second year, scoring in 3–1 home victories over RCD Mallorca and Atlético Madrid.

In the second half of 2008–09, after the arrival of new coach José Antonio Camacho, Font was used sparingly. On 30 June 2009, the free agent moved to Real Valladolid on a three-year deal. He only saw 358 minutes of action in his only season, and the Castile and León team was also relegated from the top flight.

Font continued playing in the second tier the following years, with Xerez CD, Recreativo de Huelva, FC Cartagena, CD Lugo and Hércules CF. In July 2014, he dropped down to Segunda División B and signed for Real Oviedo, playing 35 games in his first season as they won the title. After a second campaign curtailed by a knee injury, he was released.

== Honours ==
Villarreal

- UEFA Intertoto Cup: 2003, 2004

Oviedo

- Segunda División B: 2014–15
