= Jonathan Ruiz (footballer, born 1982) =

Spanish footballer

Personal information
- Full name: Jonathan Ruiz Llaga
- Date of birth: 2 April 1982 (age 44)
- Place of birth: Écija, Spain
- Height: 1.70 m (5 ft 7 in)
- Position: Midfielder

Team information
- Current team: Osuna

Youth career
- Écija

Senior career*
Years	Team	Apps	(Gls)
2000–2003	Écija	64	(3)
2003–2008	Sevilla B	150	(3)
2008–2017	Ponferradina	293	(12)
2017–2018	Écija	32	(0)
2018–2024	Puente Genil	148	(3)
2024–	Osuna	45	(1)
- * Club domestic league appearances and goals as of 04:10, 12 August 2026 (UTC)

Jonathan Ruiz Llaga (born 2 April 1982) is a Spanish footballer who plays as a midfielder for Osuna Bote Club.

== Club career ==
Ruiz was born in Écija, Andalusia. In an 18-year professional career, he spent six seasons in the Segunda División, playing a total of 215 matches for Sevilla Atlético and SD Ponferradina and scoring five goals for the latter club.

In June 2018, the 36-year-old Ruiz moved to the Tercera División, signing with Puente Genil FC in his native region.
