= Carlos Lázaro =

Spanish footballer

Personal information
- Full name: Carlos Lázaro Vallejo
- Date of birth: 13 November 1990 (age 35)
- Place of birth: Medina del Campo, Spain
- Height: 1.79 m (5 ft 10 in)
- Position: Midfielder

Youth career
- 2003–2008: Valladolid

Senior career*
| Years | Team | Apps | (Gls) |
| 2008–2010 | Valladolid B | 36 | (2) |
| 2010–2013 | Valladolid | 8 | (0) |
| 2012 | → Huesca (loan) | 6 | (0) |
| 2012–2013 | → Huesca (loan) | 28 | (1) |
| 2013–2014 | Alavés | 13 | (0) |
| 2014–2015 | Hércules | 33 | (0) |
| 2015–2017 | Mirandés | 17 | (0) |
| 2017 | Lleida Esportiu | 8 | (0) |

International career
| 2008–2009 | Spain U19 | 7 | (0) |
- * Club domestic league appearances and goals

Carlos Lázaro Vallejo (born 13 November 1990) is a Spanish former footballer who played as a midfielder.

== Club career ==
Although born in Medina del Campo, Lázaro grew up in Olmedo (also located in Valladolid), where he began to play football. Aged 12, he joined Real Valladolid's youth system and played his first seasons with the reserves, suffering relegation to the fourth division in his first year.

First-team coach José Luis Mendilibar gave Lázaro his first chance to appear in La Liga, in one of his last games before being sacked: on 17 January 2010, he played the full 90 minutes against Racing de Santander in a final 1–1 away draw. After appearing in six of the following seven matches – three starts, but five defeats – under new manager Onésimo Sánchez, he suffered a serious injury and could not help prevent the Castile and León side's relegation, after a 0–4 loss at FC Barcelona.

For 2010–11, Lázaro was definitely promoted to Valladolid's first team, but made no official appearances whatsoever during the season, due to a bout of hyperventilation and an ankle injury. In April 2012, he was loaned to SD Huesca also in the second level until the end of the campaign, as a replacement for injured David Bauzá.
