= Villanueva de Alcardete =

- Municipality
- Coat of arms

- Location in Spain
- Coordinates: 39°40′N 3°01′W
- Country: Spain
- Autonomous community: Castile-La Mancha
- Province: Toledo
- Municipality: Villanueva de Alcardete

Area
  - Total: 147 km^{2} (57 sq mi)
- Elevation: 725 m (2,379 ft)

Population (2025-01-01)
  - Total: 2,910
  - Density: 19.8/km^{2} (51.3/sq mi)
- Time zone: UTC+1 (CET)
  - Summer (DST): UTC+2 (CEST)

Villanueva de Alcardete is a municipality located in the province of Toledo, Castile-La Mancha, Spain. According to the 2006 census (INE), the municipality had 3,773 inhabitants.
