= Perico (Spanish footballer) =

Spanish footballer (born 1985)

Personal information
- Full name: Pedro José Pinazo Arias
- Date of birth: 18 January 1985 (age 41)
- Place of birth: Málaga, Spain
- Height: 1.82 m (6 ft 0 in)
- Position: Midfielder

Youth career
- 1997–2000: Puerta Blanca
- 2000–2003: Málaga

Senior career*
| Years | Team | Apps | (Gls) |
| 2003–2007 | Málaga B | 63 | (5) |
| 2003–2007 | Málaga | 24 | (2) |
| 2007–2009 | Castellón | 53 | (6) |
| 2009–2011 | Salamanca | 65 | (6) |
| 2011–2012 | Elche | 28 | (0) |
| 2013 | Gimnàstic | 10 | (0) |
| 2013–2014 | Cádiz | 22 | (3) |
| 2014–2015 | AEL | 13 | (3) |
| 2015 | Panachaiki | 4 | (0) |

International career
| 2003 | Spain U18 | 3 | (0) |
- * Club domestic league appearances and goals as of 00:00, 18 January 2016 (UTC)

Pedro José Pinazo Arias (born 18 January 1985), known as Perico, is a Spanish former professional footballer who played as a midfielder.

He appeared in 222 Segunda División games over nine seasons, scoring a combined 19 goals for five clubs. He appeared in one match in La Liga, with Málaga.

== Club career ==
Born in Málaga, Perico began his career with hometown's Málaga CF. Almost exclusively associated to the reserves during his early spell, he only appeared once in La Liga with the Andalusians' first team, featuring 90 minutes in a 0–1 away loss against RCD Mallorca on 21 June 2003.

In July 2007, Perico left Málaga and signed a two-year contract with second division club CD Castellón. After two seasons of regular playing time, he joined fellow league side UD Salamanca.

Perico equalled a career-best five goals in 2010–11, but he could not help prevent the Castile and León team from being relegated at the end of the campaign. He subsequently continued in the second level, joining Elche CF; he was released in September 2012, however, after the arrival of Carles Gil.

In January 2013, Perico went on trial with Azerbaijan Premier League club Neftchi Baku PFC, scoring in his first friendly game, against FC Aktobe. However, nothing came of it, and he returned to his country, signing with division three's Gimnàstic de Tarragona for 18 months.

On 26 June 2013, Perico was released, subsequently moving to Cádiz CF also in the third tier.
