= Palencia CF =

Association football club in Spain

Palencia
- Full name: Palencia Club de Fútbol
- Founded: 5 March 2013; 13 years ago
- Ground: La Balastera
- Capacity: 8,100
- Chairman: Sadok Moumni Chamali
- Manager: Walter Pandiani
- League: Tercera Federación – Group 8
- 2025–26: Tercera Federación – Group 8, 4th of 18
- Website: https://www.palenciacf.com/
Home colours	Away colours

Palencia Club de Fútbol is a Spanish football club based in Palencia, in the autonomous community of Castile and León. Founded on 5 March 2013, it plays in Tercera Federación – Group 8, holding home games at Estadio Nuevo La Balastera, with a capacity of 8,100 people.

== History ==
Founded on 5 March 2013 as an immediate replacement to dissolved CF Palencia, the club was initially named Club Deportivo Atlético Palencia 1929. They proposed a merger with neighbors CD Palencia Cristo Atlético in May, but the move never materialized.

Initially assigned to the Primera Provincial de Aficionados, Atlético Palencia achieved promotion to the Primera Regional de Aficionados in 2015. In 2019, the club was renamed to Palencia Club de Fútbol, and achieved promotion to the Tercera División RFEF in 2021.

== Season to season ==
Season	Tier	Division	Place	Copa del Rey
2013–14	6	1ª Prov.	8th	
2014–15	6	1ª Prov.	2nd	
2015–16	5	1ª Reg.	12th	
2016–17	5	1ª Reg.	8th	
2017–18	5	1ª Reg.	13th	
2018–19	5	1ª Reg.	12th	
2019–20	5	1ª Reg.	7th	
2020–21	5	1ª Reg.	1st	
2021–22	5	3ª RFEF	8th	
2022–23	5	3ª Fed.	12th	
2023–24	5	3ª Fed.	7th	
2024–25	5	3ª Fed.	14th	
2025–26	5	3ª Fed.	4th	
2026–27	5	3ª Fed.		

- 6 seasons in Tercera Federación/Tercera División RFEF

== Players ==
=== First team squad ===
As of 14 July 2022

Note: Flags indicate national team as defined under FIFA eligibility rules; some limited exceptions apply. Players may hold more than one non-FIFA nationality.

No.	Pos.	Nation	Player
2	DF	ESP	Javier Carpio
3	DF	ESP	Mario Puente
4	DF	ESP	Adrià Parra
5	MF	ESP	Víctor García
6	MF	ESP	Alvi
8	MF	ESP	Chopi
9	FW	CIV	Ousmane Togola
10	MF	ESP	Ander Mediavilla
11	FW	ESP	Jesús Torres
13	GK	ESP	Chema Leobalde

No.	Pos.	Nation	Player
15	MF	ESP	Iker González
16	DF	ESP	Óscar Vázquez
19	FW	ESP	Saúl de la Fuente
20	DF	ESP	Haji Ceesay
21	MF	ESP	Anselmo Martín
22	MF	ESP	Fer Sánchez
23	MF	ESP	Mario López
—	GK	ESP	Dani Hernández
—	MF	UKR	Vyacheslav Pidnebennoy
