= Sergio García (footballer, born 1989) =

Spanish footballer

Personal information
- Full name: Sergio García de la Iglesia
- Date of birth: 8 August 1989 (age 37)
- Place of birth: Zamora, Spain
- Height: 1.72 m (5 ft 7 1/2 in)
- Position: Forward

Team information
- Current team: Noname

Youth career
- Valladolid

Senior career*
Years	Team	Apps	(Gls)
2006–2010	Valladolid B	82	(13)
2010	Valladolid	1	(0)
2010–2012	Salamanca	39	(9)
2012–2013	Zamora	29	(8)
2013–2015	Oviedo	61	(11)
2015–2017	Cartagena	63	(7)
2017–2018	Toledo	33	(6)
2018–2021	Zamora	62	(22)
2021–2023	Avilés	37	(6)
2023	Guijuelo	14	(0)
2025–	Noname	26	(6)

International career
2007–2008	Spain U19	9	(1)
- * Club domestic league appearances and goals as of 15:55, 30 October 2026 (UTC)

Sergio García de la Iglesia (born 8 August 1989) is a Spanish footballer who plays as a forward for CD Noname.

He began his career at Valladolid, playing mostly in their reserves in the Segunda División B. He also represented Salamanca, Zamora, Real Oviedo and Cartagena in the same level, winning the league title with Oviedo in 2014–15.

== Club career ==
=== Valladolid ===
Born in Zamora, Castile and León, García was a Real Valladolid youth graduate. He made his senior debut with the reserves in the 2006–07 season, in the Segunda División B.

On 4 April 2010, García made his first-team and La Liga debut, coming on as a 35th-minute substitute for Marquitos in a 0–2 home loss to Villarreal CF. The campaign ended in relegation, and that would be his only competitive appearance with the main squad.

=== Salamanca ===
On 23 July 2010, García signed with Segunda División club UD Salamanca on a two-year contract. He made his official debut on 29 August, replacing Kike López for the last minutes of a 1–1 home draw against Córdoba CF.

García scored his only professional goal in his only start of the season, opening the 2–2 home draw with CD Numancia on 4 June 2011. He totalled only 124 minutes of action, again experiencing relegation.

In his second year with the Charros, García recorded eight goals in 31 third-tier matches, including a brace on 5 February 2012 in a 3–2 victory over Sestao River Club at the Helmántico Stadium.

=== Later career ===
On 29 July 2012, the free agent García moved to Zamora CF also from division three. He scored eight times during his tenure, including a brace on 23 March 2013 to give his team a lead at Real Oviedo before falling 3–2 at the end.

García joined Oviedo on 24 June 2013. He scored six goals in his first season, including twice in the 4–1 win at UD Logroñés with only 30 minutes on the field. In his second, his six goals from 35 appearances – play-offs included – helped the Asturians to secure promotion back to the second tier after thirteen years; highlights included another double in a 4–0 home rout of SD Amorebieta in the first round of the Copa del Rey, on 3 September 2014.

García returned to the third division on 27 July 2015, signing a two-year deal at FC Cartagena. Ahead of the 2017–18 campaign, he agreed to a contract with CD Toledo in the same league.

== Honours ==
Oviedo

- Segunda División B: 2014–15
