= Estadio El Montecillo =

Stadium in Aranda de Duero, Spain

Coordinates: 41°40′04.79″N 3°41′56.08″W

El Montecillo
- Interactive map of El Montecillo
- Full name: Estadio El Montecillo
- Location: Aranda de Duero, Spain
- Capacity: 6,000
- Surface: Grass
- Field size: 105 m × 68 m (344 ft × 223 ft)

Construction
- Opened: 1977

Tenant
- Arandina CF

Estadio El Montecillo is a multi-use stadium in Aranda de Duero, Spain. It is currently used mostly for football matches. The stadium holds 6,000 people.
