= Onésimo Sánchez =

Spanish footballer and manager

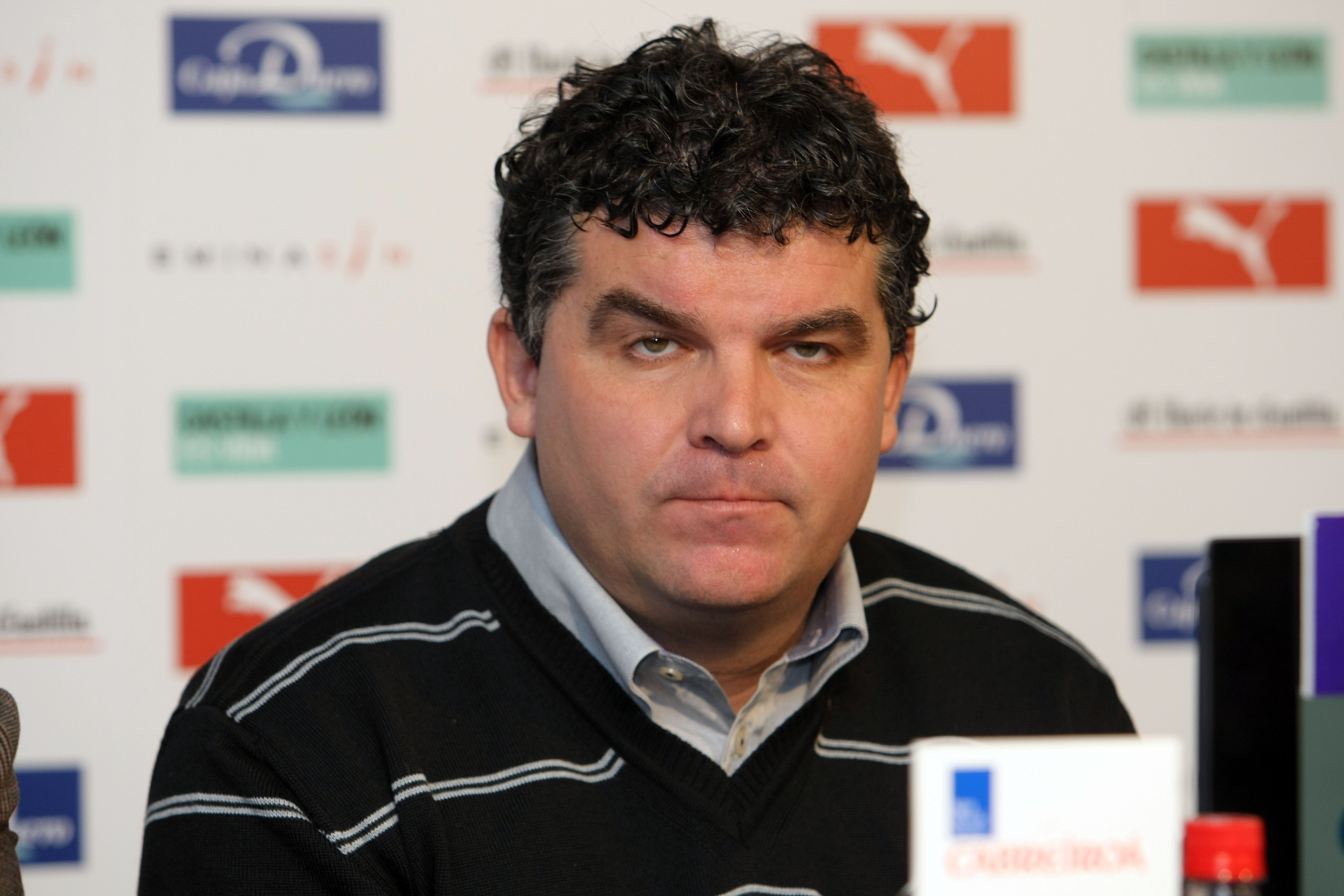
- Sánchez as Valladolid coach

Personal information
- Full name: Onésimo Sánchez González
- Date of birth: 14 August 1968 (age 58)
- Place of birth: Valladolid, Spain
- Height: 1.73 m (5 ft 8 in)
- Position: Winger

Youth career
- Valladolid

Senior career*
| Years | Team | Apps | (Gls) |
| 1986–1988 | Valladolid | 39 | (2) |
| 1988–1989 | Cádiz | 16 | (0) |
| 1989–1990 | Barcelona B | 18 | (4) |
| 1989–1990 | Barcelona | 2 | (0) |
| 1990–1993 | Valladolid | 96 | (9) |
| 1993–1996 | Rayo Vallecano | 106 | (17) |
| 1996–1997 | Sevilla | 24 | (1) |
| 1997–1998 | Rayo Vallecano | 35 | (5) |
| 1999–2000 | Burgos | 15 | (0) |
| 2000–2002 | Palencia | | |
| Total | | 351 | (38) |

International career
| 1987 | Spain U21 | 1 | (0) |

Managerial career
- 2006–2007: Valladolid B
- 2008: Huesca
- 2009–2010: Valladolid B
- 2010: Valladolid
- 2010–2011: Huesca
- 2013: Murcia
- 2015–2018: Toledo
- 2018–2019: Girona (assistant)
- 2020–2022: Celta B
- 2022–2023: Atlético Baleares
- 2024: Ibiza
- * Club domestic league appearances and goals

Onésimo Sánchez González (born 14 August 1968), known simply as Onésimo as a player, is a Spanish former professional footballer who played mainly as a winger, currently a manager.

He was mainly associated with Real Valladolid throughout his career, serving the club as both a player and manager. He amassed La Liga totals of 221 matches and 21 goals over nine seasons, which included the 1989–90 campaign spent with Barcelona.

Sánchez started working as a coach in 2006.

== Playing career ==
Onésimo was born in Valladolid, Castile and León. From the very start of his career, he had a reputation as an exceptional dribbler. However, he was also often criticised for the one dimensionality of his game, the media often drawing attention to his wastefulness in front of goal.

Onésimo's playing career began with his hometown club Real Valladolid, for whom he made nearly 50 first-team appearances before the age of 20. For the 1988–89 season, he joined fellow La Liga side Cádiz. His talent attracted the attention of Johan Cruyff, who took him to Barcelona the following summer.

Onésimo's time at the Camp Nou was an unhappy one: Cruyff, who disapproved of the player's partying, selected him only twice in the league all season. The brightest moment of his time at the club was his dominating performance after coming on as a substitute in the second leg of the UEFA Cup Winners' Cup tie against Anderlecht, even though Barça lost on aggregate (3–2).

Onésimo returned to Valladolid after a single season with Barcelona, and would experience both promotion and relegation with them the following years as well as with his next team, Rayo Vallecano. For the 1996–97 campaign he moved to Sevilla – with whom he suffered another relegation from the top flight – and returned to Rayo the following year.

After more than six months out of the game, Onésimo signed for Burgos of Segunda División B in February 1999. He saw out his career, retiring at nearly 34, with Palencia, another club in the third tier.

== Coaching career ==
Sánchez was named as coach of Real Valladolid Promesas in 2006. He left midway through the 2007–08 season to take charge of Huesca, whose manager, Manolo Villanova, had been appointed at Real Zaragoza.

Even though he led the team to promotion from division three, Sánchez's contract was not renewed, and he returned to Valladolid's reserves in 2009 following the dismissal of Paco de la Fuente. He turned the side's fortunes around as during the 2009–10 campaign they lost only one game under his management, and this success ultimately led to him being promoted to the management of the first team after the sacking of José Luis Mendilibar on 31 January 2010.

On 5 April 2010, after ten league matches – six losses and only one win – Sánchez was fired by Valladolid, with the team ranking second from bottom. That July he returned to Huesca, still in the second tier, taking them to a best-ever 14th place but resigning with a year left on his contract.

In February 2013, Sánchez returned to the second division with Real Murcia, who were 16th following the dismissal of Gustavo Siviero. He succeeded in avoiding relegation but his contract was not renewed, with the Murcians instead choosing Julio Velázquez.

Sánchez got back into management in July 2015, at Toledo of the third level on a two-year deal. After two consecutive play-off finishes, he left in January 2018 by mutual agreement, with the Castilla–La Mancha team threatened with relegation.

In the summer of 2018, Sánchez was named assistant to Eusebio Sacristán at top-flight Girona. All of the latter's staff left at the end of the season, which ended in relegation.

Sánchez was hired by Celta de Vigo B on 28 January 2020, replacing Jacobo Montes at a team second-bottom in the third tier. Four months later, having avoided relegation in a season curtailed by COVID-19, he was given a new contract to June 2021. In his first full campaign, he led the Galicians to the promotion play-offs, being eliminated 2–1 in the semi-finals on 16 May 2021 by another reserve team, Bilbao Athletic.

In June 2021, Sánchez added two more years to his contract as the team entered the new Primera Federación after a league restructuring, but was dismissed halfway through. He returned to work in the same division on 19 December 2022, at Atlético Baleares, being fired less than two months later.

On 2 May 2024, after more than a year without a club, Sánchez was named manager of third division side Ibiza on a deal until the end of the season; he took over from Guillermo Fernández Romo. He left on 27 June, after being knocked out by Barcelona Atlètic in the semi-finals of the promotion play-offs.

== Managerial statistics ==
As of 8 June 2024

Managerial record by team and tenure
| Team | Nat | From | To | Record | | | | | | | | Ref |
| Team | Nat | From | To | G | W | D | L | GF | GA | GD | Win % | Ref |
|---|---|---|---|---|---|---|---|---|---|---|---|---|
| Valladolid B | (Spain) | 20 February 2006 | 30 June 2007 | 54 | 17 | 12 | 25 | 51 | 64 | −13 | 31.48 | |
| Huesca | (Spain) | 6 March 2008 | 26 June 2008 | 15 | 5 | 7 | 3 | 17 | 16 | +1 | 33.33 | |
| Valladolid B | (Spain) | 9 February 2009 | 1 February 2010 | 37 | 22 | 8 | 7 | 65 | 30 | +35 | 59.46 | |
| Valladolid | (Spain) | 1 February 2010 | 5 April 2010 | 10 | 1 | 3 | 6 | 6 | 17 | −11 | 10.00 | |
| Huesca | (Spain) | 1 July 2010 | 8 June 2011 | 44 | 13 | 17 | 14 | 40 | 47 | −7 | 29.55 | |
| Murcia | (Spain) | 4 February 2013 | 10 July 2013 | 18 | 5 | 5 | 8 | 17 | 23 | −6 | 27.78 | |
| Toledo | (Spain) | 6 July 2015 | 23 January 2018 | 110 | 45 | 28 | 37 | 134 | 115 | +19 | 40.91 | |
| Celta B | (Spain) | 28 January 2020 | 12 July 2022 | 69 | 33 | 15 | 21 | 105 | 80 | +25 | 47.83 | |
| Atlético Baleares | (Spain) | 19 December 2022 | 13 February 2023 | 6 | 1 | 2 | 3 | 7 | 8 | −1 | 16.67 | |
| Ibiza | (Spain) | 2 May 2024 | 27 June 2024 | 6 | 1 | 2 | 3 | 8 | 10 | −2 | 16.67 | |
| Total | | | | 369 | 143 | 99 | 127 | 450 | 410 | +40 | 38.75 | — |
