= Luis Prieto (footballer, born 1979) =

Spanish footballer

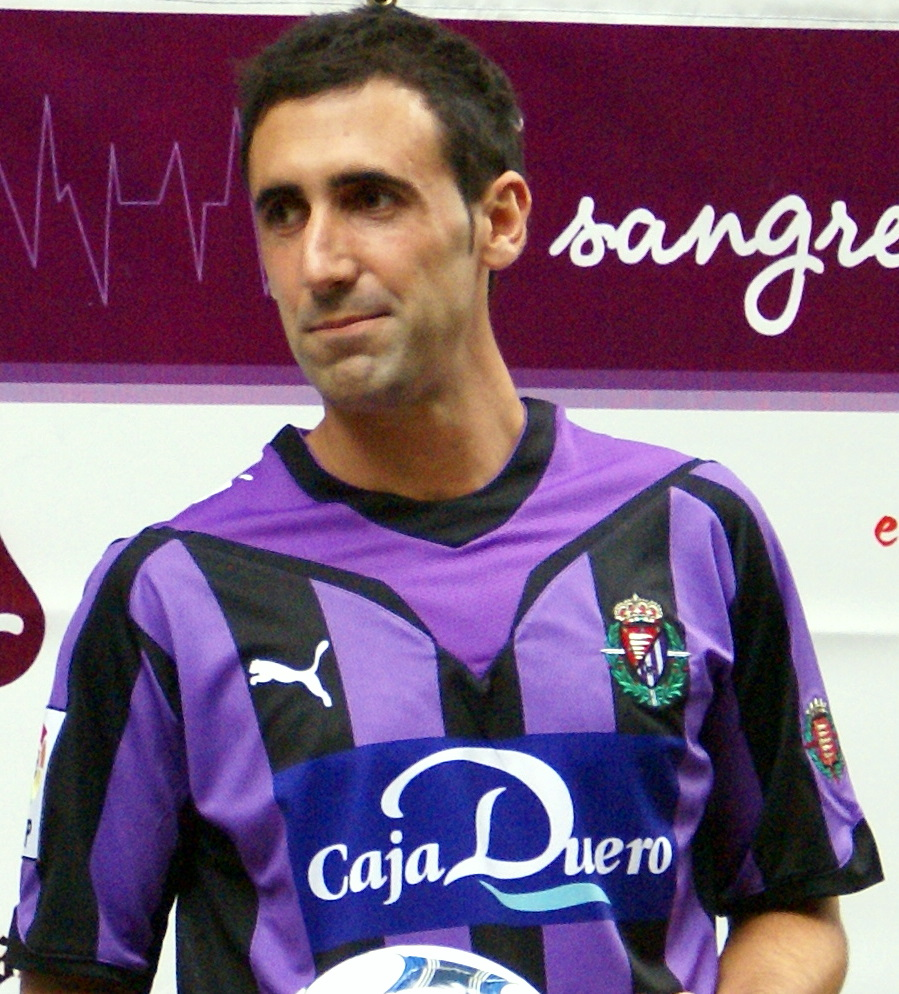
- Prieto during presentation with Valladolid

Personal information
- Full name: Luis Prieto Zalbidegoitia
- Date of birth: 19 February 1979 (age 47)
- Place of birth: Dima, Spain
- Height: 1.81 m (5 ft 11 1/2 in)
- Position: Defender

Youth career
- 1995–1997: Arratia

Senior career*
Years	Team	Apps	(Gls)
1997–1998	Basconia	34	(1)
1998–2002	Bilbao Athletic	34	(2)
1998–1999	→ Barakaldo (loan)	27	(1)
2000–2002	→ Eibar (loan)	63	(0)
2002–2008	Athletic Bilbao	134	(6)
2008–2010	Valladolid	48	(3)
2010–2011	Ponferradina	19	(0)
2011–2012	Alavés	23	(0)
Total		382	(13)

International career
2003–2006	Basque Country	3	(0)

Managerial career
- 2020–2022: Leioa (assistant)
- * Club domestic league appearances and goals

Luis Prieto Zalbidegoitia (born 19 February 1979) is a Spanish former professional footballer who played mainly as a centre-back.

He amassed La Liga totals of 182 games and nine goals over the course of eight seasons, representing in the competition Athletic Bilbao and Valladolid.

== Club career ==
Prieto was born in Dima, Biscay. Coming through the ranks of Athletic Bilbao, he spent three seasons on loan at two Basque neighbours before establishing himself in the main squad. His first-team debut came in 2002–03's opening round, a 4–2 away defeat against Real Sociedad.

In the 2005–06 campaign, as Athletic finished 12th in La Liga, Prieto scored four goals in 36 games, notably the deciders (1–0 wins) at RCD Mallorca and with CA Osasuna. After having appeared just three times during 2007–08 under Joaquín Caparrós, he left the Lions and joined fellow top-flight club Real Valladolid, on 10 July 2008; a regular starter in his first year, he saw time at stopper and right-back.

On 31 July 2009, Prieto was involved in a pre-season game against Ipswich Town, played in honour of the late Bobby Robson who died that morning, and scored an own goal in an eventual 3–1 loss to the Championship side. He appeared slightly less in the 2009–10 league campaign, mainly due to the signing in January 2010 of Portuguese Henrique Sereno. On 16 May, he opened the score as Valladolid certified their relegation after three years after losing 4–0 at eventual champions FC Barcelona.

After retiring as a player, following one-season spells at SD Ponferradina (Segunda División) and Deportivo Alavés (Segunda División B), Prieto became a coach focusing on fitness aspects; he spent time with the youth categories of Athletic Bilbao at the club's Lezama training centre. Subsequently, he worked as assistant manager with SD Leioa and fitness coach with CD Mirandés and SD Eibar, under his former Athletic teammate Joseba Etxeberria at the latter two.

== International career ==
Prieto earned caps for the Basque Country autonomous team.
