= Arandina CF =

Spanish association football club

Arandina
- Full name: Arandina Club de Fútbol
- Nickname: La Arandina
- Founded: 1987; 39 years ago
- Ground: El Montecillo, Aranda, Castile and León, Spain
- Capacity: 6,000
- President: (Spain) Virginia Martínez
- Head coach: (Spain) Álex Izquierdo
- League: Tercera Federación – Group 8
- 2025–26: Tercera Federación – Group 8, 12th of 18
- Website: arandinacf.net
Home colours	Away colours

Arandina Club de Fútbol is a Spanish football team based in Aranda de Duero, in the autonomous community of Castile and León. Founded in 1987, it plays in Tercera Federación – Group 8, holding home games at Estadio El Montecillo, with a capacity of 6,000 seats.

== History ==
After the disappearance of the historic SD Gimnástica Arandina, in 1987 local football was represented by Unión Deportiva Aranda (founded in 1983). On 29 July 1987, on the assembly it was decided to withdraw this club and employ part of its most prominent players along with new ones to form a new club, Arandina Club de Fútbol.

=== Club background ===
- Club Deportivo Aranda - (1920–23)
- Sociedad Gimnástica Arandina - (1923–25)
- Aranda Fútbol Club - (1925–27)
- Gimnástica Arandina (I) - (1927–33)
- Cultural Arandina - (1932)
- Club Deportivo Imperial - (1933)
- Gimnástica Arandina - (1948–87)
- Arandina Club de Fútbol - (1987–)

== Players ==
Spanish teams are limited to three players without EU citizenship. The squad list includes only the principal nationality of each player; several non-European players on the squad have dual citizenship with an EU country. Also, players from the ACP countries in Africa, the Caribbean, and the Pacific that are signatories to the Cotonou Agreement are not counted against non-EU quotas due to the Kolpak ruling.

=== Current squad ===
As of 2 February 2024

Note: Flags indicate national team as defined under FIFA eligibility rules; some limited exceptions apply. Players may hold more than one non-FIFA nationality.

No.	Pos.	Nation	Player
1	GK	MAR	Mohamed Boukili
2	DF	ARG	Joaquín Moisello
3	DF	ESP	Javier Varona
4	DF	ESP	Jorge Pesca
5	DF	ESP	Fer Bajo
6	MF	ESP	Vitolo
7	FW	ESP	Ayoub El Battioui
8	MF	ESP	Nico Arce (on loan from Real Avilés)
9	FW	ESP	Alfredo Sualdea
10	MF	ESP	Sergio Santa
11	DF	ESP	Zazu (captain)

No.	Pos.	Nation	Player
12	FW	ESP	Átomo
13	GK	ESP	Roberto Jara
14	FW	ESP	Adrián Pérez
15	FW	GHA	Pepe Otu
16	MF	ESP	Javi Bueno
17	FW	CPV	Raly Cabral
19	DF	COL	Deiby Ochoa
20	FW	ESP	Kevin Manzano
21	FW	ESP	Gonzalo Serrano
22	DF	ESP	Haji Ceesay
—	DF	ESP	Dieguito Pérez

== Season to season ==
Season	Tier	Division	Place	Copa del Rey
1987–88	5	Reg. Pref.	1st	
1988–89	4	3ª	13th	
1989–90	4	3ª	4th	
1990–91	4	3ª	13th	First round
1991–92	4	3ª	17th	
1992–93	4	3ª	11th	
1993–94	4	3ª	7th	
1994–95	4	3ª	7th	
1995–96	4	3ª	7th	
1996–97	4	3ª	14th	
1997–98	4	3ª	18th	
1998–99	5	Reg. Pref.	2nd	
1999–2000	4	3ª	12th	
2000–01	4	3ª	19th	
2001–02	5	1ª Reg.	14th	
2002–03	5	1ª Reg.	1st	
2003–04	4	3ª	17th	
2004–05	4	3ª	5th	
2005–06	4	3ª	9th	
2006–07	4	3ª	6th	

Season	Tier	Division	Place	Copa del Rey
2007–08	4	3ª	4th	
2008–09	4	3ª	5th	
2009–10	4	3ª	3rd	
2010–11	4	3ª	4th	
2011–12	3	2ª B	17th	
2012–13	4	3ª	3rd	
2013–14	4	3ª	3rd	
2014–15	4	3ª	1st	
2015–16	3	2ª B	15th	Second round
2016–17	3	2ª B	19th	
2017–18	4	3ª	2nd	
2018–19	4	3ª	3rd	
2019–20	4	3ª	3rd	
2020–21	4	3ª	4th / 1st	
2021–22	5	3ª RFEF	7th	
2022–23	5	3ª Fed.	1st	
2023–24	4	2ª Fed.	15th	Round of 32
2024–25	5	3ª Fed.	4th	
2025–26	5	3ª Fed.	12th	
2026–27	5	3ª Fed.		

- 3 seasons in Segunda División B
- 1 season in Segunda Federación
- 27 seasons in Tercera División
- 5 seasons in Tercera Federación/Tercera División RFEF

== Former players ==
- (Guinea-Bissau) Niche
- (Spain) Pablo Infante

== Former coaches ==
- (Spain) Miguel Ángel Portugal
- (Spain) Julio Velázquez
