= Nivaldo (footballer, born 1980) =

Brazilian footballer

Personal information
- Full name: Nivaldo Batista Santana
- Date of birth: 23 June 1980 (age 46)
- Place of birth: Feira de Santana, Brazil
- Height: 1.87 m (6 ft 1 1/2 in)
- Position: Centre back

Team information
- Current team: Lagarto

Youth career
- 1999–2000: Fluminense-BA

Senior career*
Years	Team	Apps	(Gls)
2001	Colo-Colo (Brazil)		
2002	Náutico		
2003	Rio Branco-PR		
2003	Coritiba	7	(1)
2004–2005	Fortaleza	1	(0)
2006	Paulista		
2006	Coritiba	2	(0)
2006–2007	Belenenses	28	(3)
2007–2009	Saint-Étienne	14	(0)
2008–2009	→ Umm-Salal (loan)	17	(0)
2009–2010	Valladolid	25	(2)
2010–2012	Maccabi Tel Aviv	30	(1)
2012–2014	Rio Ave	20	(0)
2014–2016	Maccabi Yavne	42	(3)
2016	Ashdod	26	(3)
2016–2017	Hapoel Katamon	19	(2)
2018–	Lagarto		
- * Club domestic league appearances and goals as of 23 July 2017

Nivaldo Batista Santana (born 23 June 1980), known simply as Nivaldo, is a Brazilian former professional footballer who played as a central defender for Lagarto Futebol Clube.

== Football career ==
Born in Feira de Santana, Bahia, Nivaldo started playing with modest Brazilian clubs – he did represent Coritiba Foot Ball Club on two occasions, but appeared rarely – and moved to Portugal with C.F. Os Belenenses in 2007, being an undisputed starter as the Lisbon team finished fifth and qualified for the UEFA Cup, with the defender scoring four goals, partnering future FC Porto and Portugal star Rolando in the heart of the back four; on 28 February 2007, he also helped them come from behind against lowly GD Bragança and reach the semi-finals of the Taça de Portugal following a 2–1 away win.

Nivaldo joined AS Saint-Étienne for a price of €3 million in summer 2007, but featured sparingly in his debut season. The following year he was loaned to Qatari side Umm-Salal Sports Club, allegedly against his will.

After being released in June 2009, Nivaldo joined Spanish club Real Valladolid on a one-year contract. He made his La Liga debut on 30 August in a 0–0 draw at UD Almería, being sent off in the 13th minute; he also received his marching orders when he scored his first goal on 4 October, helping the hosts draw 2–2 against Athletic Bilbao.

In June 2010, after Valladolid's relegation, Nivaldo changed teams and countries again, signing a two-year contract with Maccabi Tel Aviv F.C. of Israel on a free transfer. On 1 August he netted his first goal, in a Toto Cup win against Maccabi Netanya FC; thirteen days later, however, he was sidelined for two months due to a knee injury, which forced the club to sign Savo Pavićević as a cover.

== Honours ==
Náutico

- Campeonato Pernambucano: 2002

Coritiba

- Campeonato Paranaense: 2004

Ashdod

- Liga Leumit: 2015–16
