= Kike López =

Spanish footballer

Personal information
- Full name: Enrique López Delgado
- Date of birth: 12 January 1988 (age 38)
- Place of birth: Salamanca, Spain
- Height: 1.69 m (5 ft 7 in)
- Positions: Winger; right-back

Team information
- Current team: Santa Marta

Youth career
- Santa Marta
- Valladolid

Senior career*
| Years | Team | Apps | (Gls) |
| 2006–2009 | Valladolid B | 74 | (7) |
| 2007–2009 | Valladolid | 6 | (0) |
| 2008 | → Poli Ejido (loan) | 10 | (1) |
| 2009–2011 | Salamanca | 73 | (11) |
| 2011–2012 | Villarreal B | 15 | (0) |
| 2012 | Tenerife | 20 | (3) |
| 2012–2013 | Alcorcón | 29 | (4) |
| 2013–2015 | Cádiz | 46 | (8) |
| 2015 | Alcoyano | 13 | (1) |
| 2015–2019 | Atlético Baleares | 136 | (8) |
| 2019–2021 | Ibiza | 51 | (2) |
| 2021 | Melilla | 11 | (0) |
| 2022–2024 | Cornellà | 77 | (0) |
| 2024–2026 | Guijuelo | 45 | (5) |
| 2026– | Santa Marta | | |
- * Club domestic league appearances and goals as of 13:47, 30 September 2026 (UTC)

Enrique "Kike" López Delgado (born 12 January 1988) is a Spanish professional footballer who plays as a right winger or a right-back for Tercera Federación club Santa Marta.

== Club career ==
A product of Real Valladolid's youth system, López was born in Salamanca, Castile and León, and appeared in three La Liga games with the first team in 2007–08 all as a late substitute. He would finish the season loaned to Segunda División side Polideportivo Ejido and, after not being able to help prevent relegation, scoring in the last minute of a 1–1 home draw against Gimnàstic de Tarragona, he returned to Valladolid in July.

Still in the top flight, López again appeared rarely for Valladolid in the 2008–09 campaign. Subsequently, on 22 July 2009 he signed a three-year contract with UD Salamanca, with the former club having an option to rebuy in the first two.

In the following seasons, safe for the first half of 2011–12 with Villarreal CF B and the full 2012–13 with AD Alcorcón in the second tier, López competed exclusively in the Segunda División B.
