= Estadio Nueva Balastera =

Football stadium in Palencia, Spain

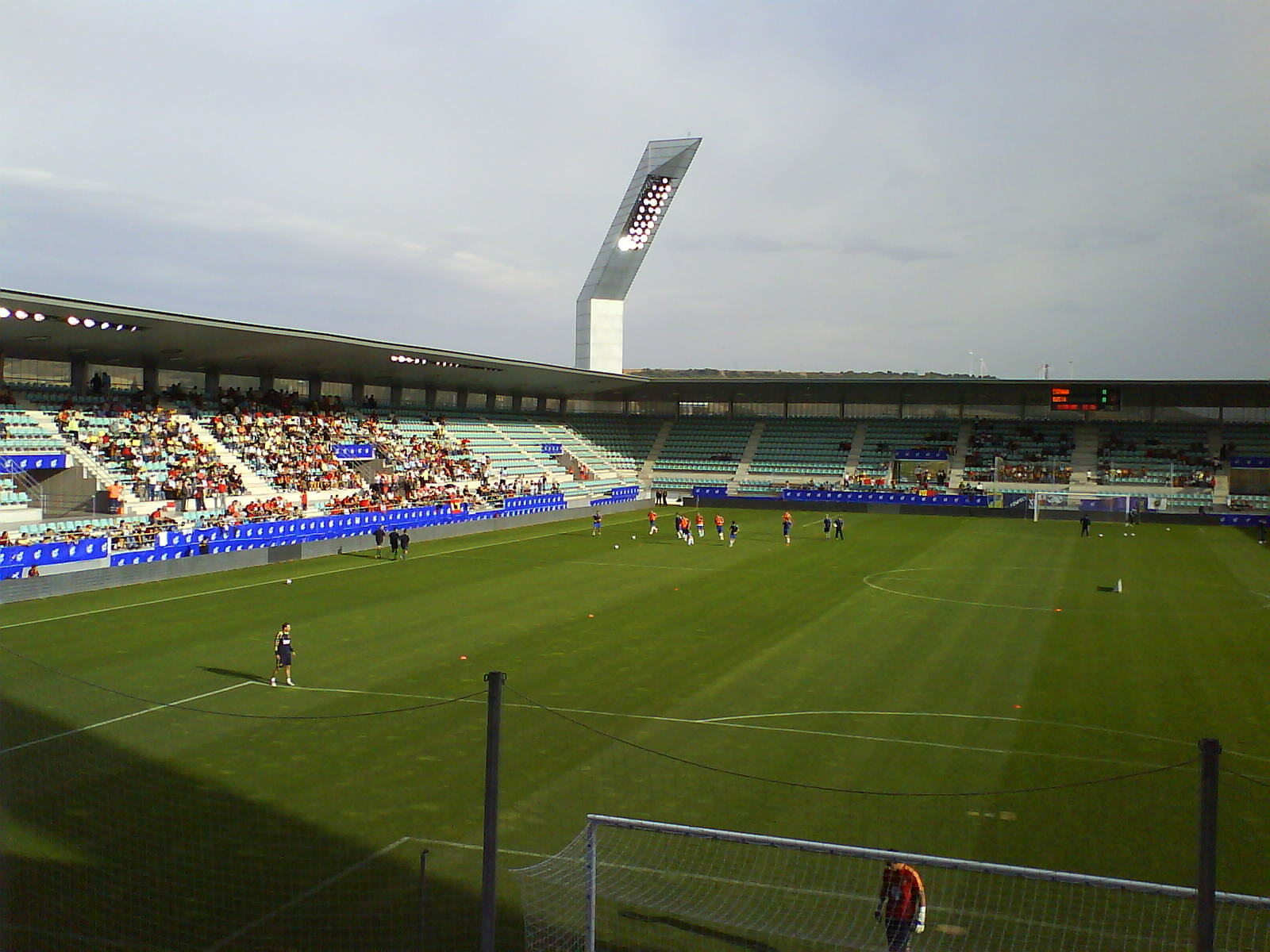
- La Nueva Balastera
- Interactive map of Estadio Nueva Balastera
- Location: Palencia, Spain
- Coordinates: 42°00′42.26″N 4°30′58.09″W
- Owner: Municipality of Palencia
- Capacity: 8,100
- Surface: grass
- Field size: 105 x 68 m

Construction
- Opened: October 10, 2006
- Cost: €18,000,000
- Architect: Patxi Mangado

Tenants
- CF Palencia (2006–2011); CD Cristo Atlético (2012–present); CD Palencia (2014–2017)

Estadio Nueva Balastera is a football stadium in Palencia, Spain. It is the home ground of CF Palencia. The stadium holds 8,100 and was built in 2006, replacing the old La Balastera, built in 1943.

== Construction ==
It was built by a group of local enterprises with a final cost of €18,000,000. Its main promoter was president Alberto de la Corte López who proposed a new stadium for Palencia in 2001 and encouraged public and private institutions to take over the project. Corte López died after a long illness before the project completed.

The architect was Patxi Mangado, who sought a minimalist style. Particular importance was attached to the lighting of the building.

== Facilities ==
The stadium seats 8,100 people.

It hosts the offices of the Municipal Sports Board, CD Cristo Atlético and CD Palencia Balompié.

Its construction led to the creation of a new neighborhood, known as "Sector 8" (or "Barrio de la Nueva Balastera"). Blocks of houses were built around the stadium, complemented by green areas and the rechanneling of a part of Villalobón Creek.

== Design ==
The stadium has a rectangular shape. It is minimalist and contemporary. The exterior facades consist of a low glazed floor destined to house offices, shops and other dependencies. On this floor are raised sheets of metal that cover the bleachers. In each of the four corners of the building are vertical towers that lean noticeably into the stadium. The towers support the lights and are a fundamental part of the image of the building. The most striking aspect of the stadium is its night lighting. The towers are covered with translucent plastic sheets, and are illuminated in their entirety. In addition, the separation of the glass and metal floors is marked by a series of small lights that surround the façades.
