= Quique Martín =

Spanish footballer

Personal information
- Full name: Enrique Martín Sánchez
- Date of birth: 29 December 1972 (age 53)
- Place of birth: Avilés, Spain
- Height: 1.72 m (5 ft 8 in)
- Position: Forward

Youth career
- Avilés
- 1989–1992: Barcelona

Senior career*
Years	Team	Apps	(Gls)
1992–1995	Barcelona B	73	(7)
1995–1997	Mérida	68	(19)
1997–1999	Espanyol	53	(4)
1999–2001	Salamanca	70	(18)
2001–2002	Villarreal	14	(0)
2002–2003	Salamanca	33	(5)
2003–2005	Terrassa	66	(8)
2005–2011	Salamanca	181	(43)
Total		558	(104)

International career
1990–1991	Spain U18	5	(0)
- * Club domestic league appearances and goals

Enrique 'Quique' Martín Sánchez (born 29 December 1972) is a Spanish former professional footballer who played as a forward.

He represented six teams in a 19-year senior career, mainly Salamanca (three spells). He amassed La Liga totals of 104 games and eight goals over the course of four seasons, with Mérida, Espanyol and Villarreal.

== Career ==
Martín was born in Avilés, Asturias. An unsuccessful youth graduate at FC Barcelona – he was only a member of the reserve squad – he went on to represent five clubs in his extensive professional career (CP Mérida, RCD Espanyol, UD Salamanca, Villarreal CF and Terrassa FC), in both La Liga and the Segunda División. His debut in the Spanish top flight arrived in the 1995–96 season with Mérida, appearing in 37 games in an eventual relegation; he contributed a career-best 15 goals the following campaign, as the team returned to where they had come from.

With Castile and León's Salamanca, Martín was instrumental in the 2006 promotion from Segunda División B. He finished 2007–08 as the player with the most appearances in the second tier, 338, adding that distinction to 13 league goals – squad best, joint-tenth in the competition – which earned him a one-year contract extension aged almost 36.

In 2009–10, Martín played almost 1,000 minutes less than the previous season due to injury problems, and he also did not manage to find the net after totalling 25 goals over the last two. Salamanca barely avoided relegation, finishing in 16th position.

In June 2011, after the side was relegated, with him only scoring once through a penalty, Martín retired from football at 38, having appeared in 529 games across both major levels of Spanish football (98 goals), 425 of those in the second division.
