= CF Palencia =

Spanish football team

Palencia
- Full name: Club de Fútbol Palencia
- Founded: 1975
- Dissolved: 2012
- Ground: La Nueva Balastera, Palencia, Castile and León, Spain
- Capacity: 8,100
- 2012–13: 3ª – Group 8, W
| Home colours | Away colours |

Club de Fútbol Palencia was a Spanish football team based in Palencia, in the autonomous community of Castile and León. Founded in 1975 and dissolved in 2012, it held home games at Estadio La Nueva Balastera, with an 8,100-seat capacity.

== History ==
Palencia has had many football clubs, the beginnings being in June 1929 with Club Deportivo Palencia. In 1943 it first reached Tercera División after a win against Orensana, as the club was then known as Fábrica Nacional de Palencia.

In 1951 Palencia was renamed Atlético Palencia, also facing relegation that year due to economic problems. Three years later, it visited the national categories for the second time; in 1962–63 it appeared in the playoffs for promotion to Segunda División, facing CF Badalona: amidst accusations of a fixed result, the club did not appear for their following match at SD Ponferradina, and eventually disappeared from the footballing maps.

The club reappeared in the late '60s, very briefly as Otero de Palencia, quickly changing to Palencia Club de Fútbol. In 1970–71 it played in the play-offs for a second division promotion for the second time, now against Real Oviedo; stellar performances from goalkeeper Mariano García Remón, later player (then manager) of Real Madrid, eventually prevented that achievement.

On 17 June 1979, with another legendary Real Madrid figure as coach, Francisco Gento, Palencia was first promoted to second level after a 1–0 home win against Pontevedra CF, incidentally one day before the 50th anniversary of the first football match in the club's history – it lasted two seasons in this first tenure. In 1982–83, right after the FIFA World Cup on home soil, the club produced arguably its best season, finishing fifth just three points shy of an historical La Liga promotion; three years later it disappeared, again due to economic issues.

Club Deportivo Cristo Olímpico, then the feeder club, became first team of the city but, in 1989, it was named Club de Fútbol Palencia. During the following two decades, it bounced back between Segunda División B (the new third level created in 1977) and the fourth category.

On 1 July 2012, Palencia was relegated to the fourth level by the Royal Spanish Football Federation, due to non-payment of wages to its players. On 4 December the club was disbanded after failing to raise enough financial funds to run it until the end of the season, having incurred in a €1,7 million net debt from past years.

In 2013, another club in the city was created under the name of CDR Atlético Palencia 1929.

=== Former clubs ===
- Club Deportivo Palencia – (1929–41)
- Fábrica Nacional de Palencia – (1941–51)
- Atlético Palencia – (1951–60)
- Palencia Club de Fútbol – (1960–86)

=== Club background ===
- Club Deportivo Cristo Olímpico – (1975–87)
- Club de Fútbol Palencia Cristo Olímpico – (1987–99)
- Club de Fútbol Palencia – (1999–2012)

== Season to season ==
- As CD Cristo Olímpico, farm team

| Season | Tier | Division | Place | Copa del Rey |
|---|---|---|---|---|
| 1975–76 | 5 | 1ª Reg. | 2nd | |
| 1976–77 | 5 | 1ª Reg. | 1st | |
| 1977–78 | 5 | Reg. Pref. | 16th | |
| 1978–79 | 6 | 1ª Reg. | 1st | |
| 1979–80 | 5 | Reg. Pref. | 11th | |
| 1980–81 | 4 | 3ª | 19th | |
| 1981–82 | 5 | Reg. Pref. | 1st | |

| Season | Tier | Division | Place | Copa del Rey |
|---|---|---|---|---|
| 1982–83 | 4 | 3ª | 7th | |
| 1983–84 | 4 | 3ª | 11th | |
| 1984–85 | 4 | 3ª | 11th | |
| 1985–86 | 4 | 3ª | 8th | |
| 1986–87 | 4 | 3ª | 6th | |
| 1987–88 | 4 | 3ª | 5th | |

- As CF Palencia Cristo Olímpico

| Season | Tier | Division | Place | Copa del Rey |
|---|---|---|---|---|
| 1988–89 | 4 | 3ª | 3rd | |
| 1989–90 | 4 | 3ª | 1st | |
| 1990–91 | 3 | 2ª B | 6th | |
| 1991–92 | 3 | 2ª B | 12th | |
| 1992–93 | 3 | 2ª B | 4th | |
| 1993–94 | 3 | 2ª B | 15th | |
| 1994–95 | 3 | 2ª B | 9th | |
| 1995–96 | 3 | 2ª B | 19th | |
| 1996–97 | 4 | 3ª | 2nd | |
| 1997–98 | 4 | 3ª | 1st | |
| 1998–99 | 4 | 3ª | 6th | |

- As CF Palencia

| Season | Tier | Division | Place | Copa del Rey |
|---|---|---|---|---|
| 1999–2000 | 4 | 3ª | 7th | |
| 2000–01 | 4 | 3ª | 1st | |
| 2001–02 | 4 | 3ª | 4th | |
| 2002–03 | 4 | 3ª | 1st | |
| 2003–04 | 3 | 2ª B | 12th | |
| 2004–05 | 3 | 2ª B | 13th | |
| 2005–06 | 3 | 2ª B | 12th | |

| Season | Tier | Division | Place | Copa del Rey |
|---|---|---|---|---|
| 2006–07 | 3 | 2ª B | 3rd | |
| 2007–08 | 3 | 2ª B | 19th | |
| 2008–09 | 4 | 3ª | 1st | |
| 2009–10 | 3 | 2ª B | 3rd | |
| 2010–11 | 3 | 2ª B | 5th | First round |
| 2011–12 | 3 | 2ª B | 16th | |
| 2012–13 | 4 | 3ª | W | |

- 14 seasons in Segunda División B
- 18 seasons in Tercera División

== Former players ==
- Category:CF Palencia footballers
