= 2011 Castilla y León Cup =

2011 Copa Castilla y León
Tournament details
- Host country: Spain
- Dates: 27 July – 5 October 2011
- Teams: 20

Final positions
- Champions: CD Mirandés
- Runners-up: Villaralbo CF

Tournament statistics
- Matches played: 12
- Goals scored: 29 (2.42 per match)

The 2011 Castilla y León Cup (Spanish: Copa Castilla y León 2011) is the third edition of this football trophy in its renewed version.

== Teams participants ==
Team	TC	Province	League (Lv)
Real Valladolid	2	Valladolid	Liga Adelante (2)
Numancia	0	Soria	Liga Adelante (2)
UD Salamanca	1	Salamanca	Segunda División B (3)
SD Ponferradina	1	León	Segunda División B (3)
Palencia	0	Palencia	Segunda División B (3)
Mirandés	0	Burgos	Segunda División B (3)
Gimnástica Segoviana	0	Segovia	Segunda División B (3)
Zamora	0	Zamora	Segunda División B (3)
Guijuelo	0	Salamanca	Segunda División B (3)
Burgos	0	Burgos	Segunda División B (3)

Team	TC	Province	League (Lv)
Arandina	0	Burgos	Segunda División B (3)
Cultural Leonesa	4	León	Tercera División (4)
SD Almazán	0	Soria	Tercera División (4)
Atlético Bembibre	0	León	Tercera División (4)
Atlético Astorga	0	León	Tercera División (4)
Real Ávila	0	Ávila	Tercera División (4)
Villaralbo	0	Zamora	Tercera División (4)
CD Íscar	0	Valladolid	Tercera División (4)
Huracán Z	0	León	Tercera División (4)
CD Aguilar	0	Palencia	Tercera División (4)

== Calendar ==
The schedule and format of the tournament was decided by Castilla y León Football Federation.

Round	Date	Fixtures	Clubs	Notes
First round	27 July – 4 August 2011	8	20 → 12	
Second round	3 – 6 August 2011	4	12 → 8	
Quarterfinals	13 and 24 August 2011	4	8 → 4	Both Liga Adelante teams and last edition finalists gain entry
Semifinals	13 and 21 September 2011	2	4 → 2	
Final	5 October 2011	1	2 → 1	Final venue to be drawn

== Matches ==
=== First round ===
27 July 2011
19:30 CEST

SD Almazán	1 – 1	Burgos
Gabi 18'		54' Naya
Penalties
Abel (penalty scored); Yesu (penalty missed); Bachi (penalty scored); Martín López (penalty missed)	2 – 4	(penalty scored) Igna; (penalty scored) Vega; (penalty scored) Naya; (penalty scored) Colina

La Arboleda, Almazán (Soria)
Attendance: 150
Referee: Campos Goeloe

27 July 2011
20:00 CEST

Atlético Bembibre	3 – 1	Atlético Astorga
David Álvarez 31'; Roberto Puente 66'; Víctor Vega 74'		83' Mario Villar

La Devesa, Bembibre (León)
Attendance: 100
Referee: Quindós Macías

28 July 2011
20:30 CEST

Villaralbo	2 – 1	Zamora
Carmona 17'; Manu 21'		34' Jona

Fernández García, Villaralbo (Zamora)
Attendance: 500
Referee: Vaquero Girón

29 July 2011
20:00 CEST

Huracán Z	1 – 2	Cultural Leonesa
Vila 50' (pen.)		3' Adrián Rojo; 85' Murci

Rafael Tejerina, Trobajo del Camino (León)
Attendance: 500

29 July 2011
20:30 CEST

Arandina	1 – 2	Mirandés
Ayrton Cabral 50'		19' Lambarri; 66' Pablo Infante

El Montecillo, Aranda de Duero (Burgos)
Attendance: 300
Referee: Díez Cano

30 July 2011
19:00 CEST

CD Íscar	2 – 0	Gimnástica Segoviana
David Alonso 19'; Velayos 55'

Nuevo San Miguel, Íscar (Valladolid)
Attendance: 250
Referee: Ferrero Vega

31 July 2011
18:00 CEST

CD Aguilar	1 – 1	Palencia
Guíller 85'		61' Jandro
Penalties
	2 – 4

Alberto Fernández, Aguilar de Campoo (Palencia)
Attendance: 350
Referee: Garrido Ruiz

4 August 2011
20:00 CEST

Real Ávila	0 – 3	Guijuelo
		27' Jonathan; 35' Edu Espada; 39' Romero

Adolfo Suárez, Ávila
Attendance: 200
Referee: Plaza García

=== Second round ===
3 August 2011
20:00 CEST

Burgos	1 – 2	Mirandés
Addison 27'		50' Alain; 53' Iribas

El Plantío, Burgos
Attendance: 1,500
Referee: Cuesta Revilla

3 August 2011
20:00 CEST

Atlético Bembibre	2 – 0	Cultural Leonesa
David Álvarez 66'; Tano 84'

La Devesa, Bembibre (León)
Attendance: 200
Referee: Quindós Macías

4 August 2011
20:00 CEST

CD Íscar	2 – 0	Palencia
Velayos 28'; Ricardo 56'

Nuevo San Miguel, Íscar (Valladolid)
Attendance: 300
Referee: Rivera García

6 August 2011
19:00 CEST

Villaralbo	0 – 0	Guijuelo
Penalties
	4 – 3

Fernández García, Villaralbo (Zamora)
Attendance: 200
Referee: Vaquero Girón

=== Quarterfinals ===
13 August 2011
19:00 CEST

Villaralbo	1 – 0	UD Salamanca
Carmona 92'

Fernández García, Villaralbo (Zamora)
Attendance: 600
Referee: Juan Busto

13 August 2011
19:30 CEST

Mirandés	3 – 3	Numancia
Lambarri 7', 11'; Pablo 71'		Nagore 24', 83'; Juanjo 38'
Penalties
	5 – 4

Anduva, Miranda de Ebro (Burgos)
Attendance: 1,300
Referee: Pérez Martín

13 August 2011
20:30 CEST

Atlético Bembibre	1 – 2	SD Ponferradina
Raúl 89'		Mateo 15'; Doménech 53'

La Devesa, Bembibre (León)
Attendance: 150
Referee: Quindós Macías

24 August 2011
19:00 CEST

CD Íscar	1 – 6	Real Valladolid
Adalia 60'		Óscar 8'; Marquitos 20'; Víctor Pérez 52'; Dani Aquino 74', 77'; Jofre 86'

Nuevo San Miguel, Íscar (Valladolid)
Attendance: 1,000
Referee: Fernández Felipe

=== Semifinals ===
20 September 2011
20:45 CEST

Villaralbo	3 – 1	Real Valladolid
Zambrano 22'; Obispo 46'; Manu 81'		Lolo 73' (pen.)

Fernández García, Villaralbo (Zamora)
Referee: Alberca García

21 September 2011
20:00 CEST

Mirandés	7 – 0	SD Ponferradina
Aitor Blanco 30'; Alain 63', 76', 84', 87'; Muneta 69', 77'

Anduva, Miranda de Ebro (Burgos)
Attendance: 2,100
Referee: Díez Cano

=== Final ===
The draw will be held in September 2011. The venue will be also drawn. The Final Match will be played on 5 October 2011.

5 October 2011
20:30 CEST

Villaralbo	0 – 1	CD Mirandés
		Muneta 92'

Fernández García, Villaralbo (Zamora)
Attendance: 2,000
Referee: Turienzo Álvarez

== See also ==
- Castilla y León Cup
