= 2012 Castilla y León Cup =

2012 Copa Castilla y León
Tournament details
- Host country: Spain
- Dates: 28 July – 5 September 2012
- Teams: 16

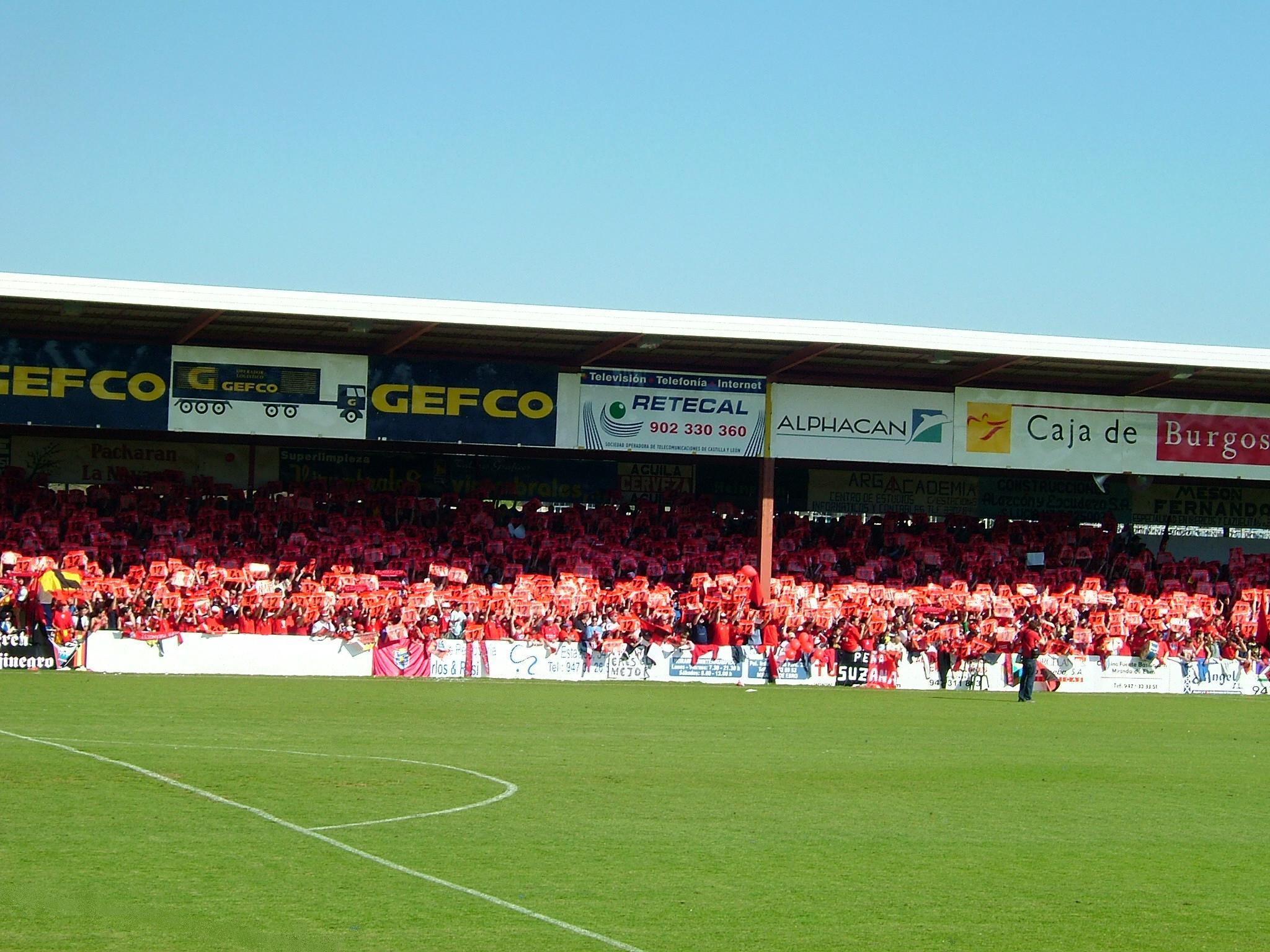
Mirandés - Burgos

The 2012 Castilla y León Cup (Spanish: Copa Castilla y León 2012) is the fourth edition of this football trophy in its renewed version.

== Teams participants ==
Team	TC	Province	League (Lv)
Real Valladolid	2	Valladolid	Liga BBVA (1)
Mirandés	1	Burgos	Liga Adelante (2)
Numancia	0	Soria	Liga Adelante (2)
Ponferradina	1	León	Liga Adelante (2)
Guijuelo	0	Salamanca	Segunda División B (3)
Palencia	0	Palencia	Segunda División B (3)
Salamanca	1	Salamanca	Segunda División B (3)
Arandina	0	Burgos	Tercera División (4)

Team	TC	Province	League (Lv)
Atlético Astorga	0	León	Tercera División (4)
Atlético Bembibre	0	León	Tercera División (4)
Burgos	0	Burgos	Tercera División (4)
Cristo Atlético	0	Palencia	Tercera División (4)
La Granja	0	Segovia	Tercera División (4)
Real Ávila	0	Ávila	Tercera División (4)
Villaralbo	0	Zamora	Tercera División (4)
Virgen del Camino	0	León	Tercera División (4)

== Group stage ==
=== Group A ===
	Pld	W	D	L	GF	GA	GD	Pts
UD Salamanca	2	2	0	0	7	0	+7	6
Real Ávila	2	1	0	1	2	4	–2	3
La Granja	2	0	0	2	0	5	–5	0

=== Group B ===
	Pld	W	D	L	GF	GA	GD	Pts
CD Guijuelo	2	2	0	0	5	0	+5	6
Cristo Atlético	2	1	0	1	1	1	0	3
Villaralbo	2	0	0	2	0	5	–5	0

=== Group C ===
	Pld	W	D	L	GF	GA	GD	Pts
Burgos	2	1	1	0	1	0	+1	4
Arandina	2	0	2	0	4	4	0	2
Palencia	2	0	1	1	4	5	–1	1

=== Group D ===
	Pld	W	D	L	GF	GA	GD	Pts
Atlético Bembibre	2	2	0	0	6	2	+4	6
Virgen del Camino	2	1	0	1	2	3	–1	3
Atlético Astorga	2	0	0	2	1	4	–3	0

== Knockout stage ==
Quarterfinals; 8 August 2012
Atlético Bembibre	3
Ponferradina	2
Salamanca	1
Valladolid	1
Burgos	2
Numancia	0
Guijuelo	1
Mirandés	2

Semifinals; 22 August 2012
Atlético Bembibre	1
Valladolid	2
Burgos	0
Mirandés	0

Final; 5 September 2012
Mirandés	4
Valladolid	1

== See also ==
- Castilla y León Cup
- 2011 Castilla y León Cup
