= 2013 Castilla y León Cup =

2013 Copa Castilla y León
Tournament details
- Host country: Spain
- Dates: 27 July – 9 October
- Teams: 14

The 2013 Castilla y León Cup (Spanish: Copa Castilla y León 2013) is the fifth edition of this football trophy in its renewed version.

== Teams participants ==
Team	TC	Province	League (Lv)
Real Valladolid	0	Valladolid	La Liga (1)
Mirandés	2	Burgos	Seguda División (2)
Numancia	0	Soria	Seguda División (2)
Ponferradina	1	León	Seguda División (2)
Guijuelo	0	Salamanca	Segunda División B (3)
Salamanca	1	Salamanca	Not registered
Zamora	0	Zamora	Segunda División B (3)

Team	TC	Province	League (Lv)
Burgos	0	Burgos	Segunda División B (3)
Cultural Leonesa	0	León	Tercera División (4)
Arandina	0	Burgos	Tercera División (4)
Atlético Astorga	0	León	Tercera División (4)
Atlético Bembibre	0	León	Tercera División (4)
La Granja	0	Segovia	Tercera División (4)
Virgen del Camino	0	León	Tercera División (4)

== Competition format ==
Valladolid, as La Liga team, and Mirandés as defending champion are directly qualified to semifinals. The other 12 teams are divided into four groups of three teams, where the top teams will qualify to the knockout stage.

Every team will play two matches in the group stage and until the final, every match will be played in the field of the team of lower category.

== Group stage ==
=== Group A ===
	Pld	W	D	L	GF	GA	GD	Pts
La Granja	1	0	1	0	0	0	0	1
Guijuelo	1	0	1	0	0	0	0	1
Salamanca	0	0	0	0	0	0	0	0

Games played

- 2013–07–28 La Granja 0–0 Guijuelo (3–1 p.s.o.)
- Games of UD Salamanca were not played. Finally La Granja qualified to the knockout stage as group A winner.

=== Group B ===
	Pld	W	D	L	GF	GA	GD	Pts
Ponferradina	2	2	0	0	4	0	+4	6
Atlético Astorga	2	1	0	1	2	2	+0	3
Atlético Bembibre	2	0	0	2	0	4	–4	0

Games played

- 2013–07–28 Atlético Bembibre 0–2 Ponferradina
- 2013–07–31 Atlético Astorga 0–2 Ponferradina
- 2013–08–03 Atlético Astorga 2–0 Atlético Bembibre

=== Group C ===
	Pld	W	D	L	GF	GA	GD	Pts
Numancia	2	2	0	0	9	0	+9	6
Burgos	2	1	0	1	3	5	–2	0
Arandina	2	0	0	2	1	8	–7	0

Games played

- 2013–07–27 Burgos 0–4 Numancia
- 2013–07–31 Arandina 0–5 Numancia
- 2013–08–03 Burgos 3–1 Arandina

=== Group D ===
	Pld	W	D	L	GF	GA	GD	Pts
Zamora	2	2	0	0	6	2	+4	6
Cultural Leonesa	2	1	0	1	4	4	+0	3
La Virgen del Camino	2	0	0	2	1	5	–4	0

Games played

- 2013–07–27 La Virgen del Camino 1–2 Cultural Leonesa
- 2013–07–31 Zamora 3–0 La Virgen del Camino
- 2013–08–03 Cultural Leonesa 2–3 Zamora

== Knockout stage ==
Second round 20, 21 August
La Granja	0
Numancia	2
Zamora	0
Ponferradina	1

Semifinals; 4 September, 9 October
Numancia	2
Mirandés	0
Ponferradina	3
Valladolid	1

Final; Palencia, 20 November
Numancia	1
Ponferradina	0

== See also ==
- Castilla y León Cup
- 2012 Castilla y León Cup
