= Miguel Álvarez Tomé =

Spanish football manager (born 1984)

Personal information
- Full name: Miguel Ángel Álvarez Tomé
- Date of birth: 25 November 1958 (age 67)
- Place of birth: León, Spain
- Height: 1.76 m (5 ft 9 in)
- Position: Defender

Senior career*
Years	Team	Apps	(Gls)
- Cultural Leonesa
- Coyanza

Managerial career
- 1991–1992: Atlético Astorga
- 1992–1997: Atlético Bembibre
- 1997–1999: Cultural Leonesa
- 2000–2001: Zamora
- 2001–2003: Cultural Leonesa
- 2003–2005: Ponferradina
- 2005–2006: Cultural Leonesa
- 2006–2009: Zamora
- 2009–2010: Granada
- 2010–2011: Alavés
- 2011–2012: Burgos
- 2014: Caudal
- 2014–2015: Palencia
- 2017: Ponferradina
- 2018–2019: Caudal
- 2022–2023: Atlético Mansillés
- 2023–2024: Villaralbo
- * Club domestic league appearances and goals

Miguel Ángel Álvarez Tomé (born 25 November 1958) is a Spanish former footballer who played as a midfielder, and a manager.

== Career ==
Álvarez Tomé was born in León, Castile and León, and represented hometown sides Cultural y Deportiva Leonesa and SDC Coyanza as a senior. He started his managerial career with Atlético Astorga FC in 1991, being later in charge of CA Bembibre for five years before taking over Cultu in Segunda División B in 1997.

Sacked by Cultural in March 1999, Álvarez Tomé was appointed Zamora CF manager in January 2000, before returning to his previous club in the following year. In June 2003, he was named in charge of SD Ponferradina, before returning to Cultural for a third spell on 19 June 2005.

In June 2006, Álvarez Tomé returned to Zamora, and led the club to two consecutive promotion play-offs before opting to leave on 31 May 2009. On 4 June 2009, he was named in charge of Granada CF, but was sacked the following 21 March.

On 1 June 2010, Álvarez Tomé was appointed Deportivo Alavés manager. After again missing out promotion in the play-offs, he left the club and took over Burgos CF on 8 October 2011.

Álvarez Tomé left the Burgaleses in June 2012, and spent more than a year without coaching before being named in charge of Caudal Deportivo on 22 January 2014. After failing to avoid relegation, he left and joined fourth division side CD Palencia Balompié on 26 December 2014, but also left the latter at the end of the season.

On 21 March 2017, after nearly two years unemployed, Álvarez Tomé returned to Ponfe, replacing sacked Pedro Munitis. He was himself replaced by Carlos Terrazas in May, before returning to Caudal on 21 November 2018.

Álvarez Tomé left Caudal in June 2019, and returned to Cultural on 14 January 2020, now as a member of the scouting area. He returned to managerial duties on 30 July 2022, with Primera Regional side CD Atlético Mansillés.

Álvarez Tomé left Mansillés on 4 June 2023, and took over Tercera Federación side CD Villaralbo on 28 November.
