= Castilla and León Cup =

Castilla y León Cup Copa Castilla y León
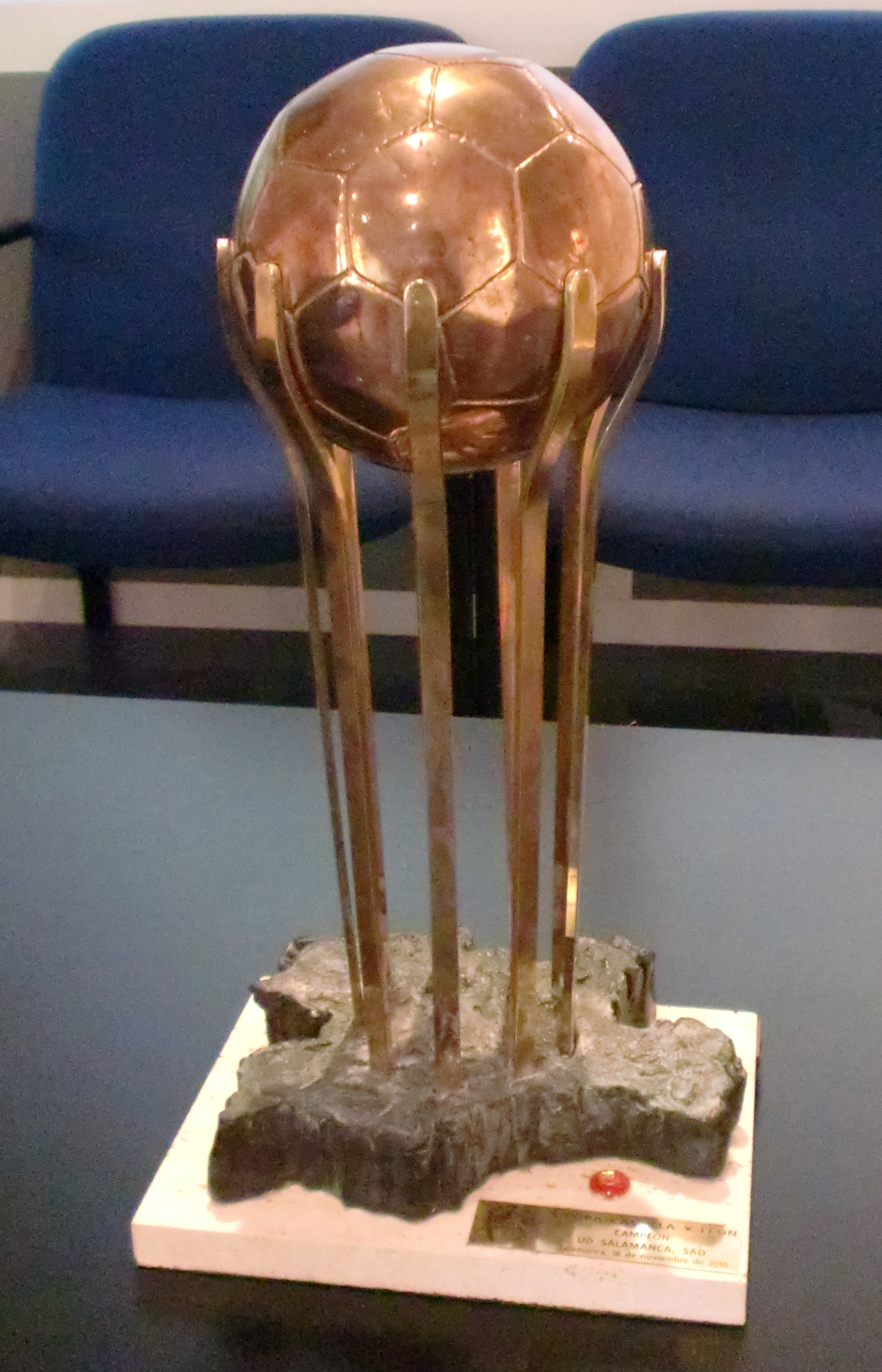
- Trophy of the Castilla y León
- Founded: 1924
- Region: (Castile and León) Castilla y León (Spain)
- Teams: 16 (since 2012)
- Current champions: CD Numancia (2013)
- Website: FCyLF.es

The Castilla y León Cup (from the Spanish expression Copa Castilla y León) is a football championship usually played on summer and autumn between the most important teams in the region of Castilla y León. It was created in 1924 as a regional championship parallel to La Liga, and was played between that year and 1931. The Spanish Civil War and the undisputed leadership of La Liga wiped out the tournament, being forgotten. In 1985, the Football Federation of Castile and León revived it as a summer tournament, being played in just that year. It was in 2009 when it returned to be played on an annual basis.

The tournament is not expected to be played in 2014.

== Tournament editions ==
=== 1924–25 Edition ===
Team	Pld	W	D	L	GF	GA	GD	Pts
CD Español	4	3	0	1	10	10	0	6
Cultural Leonesa	5	3	0	2	15	14	+1	6
Real Unión Deportiva	5	2	0	3	10	6	+4	4
UD Española	2	0	0	2	2	7	−5	0

Note: UD Española disqualified because of an improper starting 11. The remaining matches are considered defeats, so CD Español scored 4 extra points and Cultural Leonesa scored only 2, breaking the tie between those teams.

=== 1925–26 Edition ===
Team	Pld	W	D	L	GF	GA	GD	Pts
Cultural Leonesa	8	5	2	1	18	6	+12	12
Real Unión Deportiva	8	3	5	0	21	11	+10	11
CD Español	8	2	3	3	19	15	+4	7
UD Española	8	2	3	3	12	17	−5	7
UD Ferroviaria	8	1	1	6	7	28	−21	3

=== 1926–27 Edition ===
Team	Pld	W	D	L	GF	GA	GD	Pts
Real Unión Deportiva	10	8	2	0	35	8	+27	18
CD Español	10	8	1	1	46	13	+33	17
Cultural Leonesa	10	2	3	5	25	25	0	7
UD Ferroviaria	10	2	2	6	12	29	−17	6
UD Española	9	3	0	6	18	39	−21	6
Stadium Luises	9	1	2	6	11	33	−22	4

Note: The match between UD Española and Stadium Luises, both teams from Salamanca, was suspended because of a fight between players and spectators.

=== 1927–28 Edition ===
Team	Pld	W	D	L	GF	GA	GD	Pts
Cultural Leonesa	10	9	0	1	43	7	+36	18
Real Unión Deportiva	10	8	1	1	41	14	+27	17
CD Español	10	5	1	4	37	18	+19	11
UD Española	10	3	1	6	26	34	−8	7
UD Ferroviaria	10	3	1	6	10	32	−22	7
Stadium Luises	10	0	0	10	4	56	−52	0

=== 1928–29 Edition ===
==== Background ====
In 1928, Real Unión Deportiva and CD Español were merged into Real Valladolid. In Salamanca, UD Española became UD Salamanca, disappearing Stadium Luises. The new name, "UD Salamanca" was formalized during the Second Republic of Spain in 1932, but the team used that name for the Castilla y León Cup.

==== Results ====
Team	Pld	W	D	L	GF	GA	GD	Pts
Cultural Leonesa	8	7	0	1	48	4	+44	14
Real Valladolid	8	7	0	1	50	6	+44	14
UD Ferroviaria	8	4	0	4	12	23	−11	8
Burgos	8	1	0	7	7	45	−38	2
UD Salamanca	8	1	0	7	5	44	−39	2

==== Tie-break match ====
1929

Real Valladolid	3 – 4	Cultural Leonesa

Madrid

=== 1929–30 Edition ===
==== Qualifying match ====
1929

Real Valladolid	11 – 0	UD Salamanca

Valladolid

Real Valladolid qualified after 11–0 victory

==== Results ====
Team	Pld	W	D	L	GF	GA	GD	Pts
Cultural Leonesa	4	4	0	0	20	2	+18	8
Real Valladolid	4	2	0	2	4	5	−1	4
UD Ferroviaria	4	0	0	4	1	18	−17	0

=== 1930–31 Edition ===
Team	Pld	W	D	L	GF	GA	GD	Pts
Real Valladolid	8	5	3	0	29	9	+20	13
Cultural Leonesa	8	4	2	2	17	14	+3	10
CD Palencia	8	0	1	7	4	27	−23	1

Note: played two rounds of 4 matches.

=== 1985 Summer Edition ===
==== Qualifying match ====
August 3, 1985

Gimnástica Segoviana	1 – 3	Real Valladolid

La Albuera Stadium, Segovia

Real Valladolid qualified after 3–1 victory

==== Quarterfinals ====
August 5, 1985

Real Ávila	1 – 1	Zamora

Adolfo Suárez Stadium, Ávila
August 10, 1985

Zamora	1 – 2	Real Ávila

Ramiro Ledesma Stadium, Zamora

Real Ávila won 3–2 on aggregate

August 10, 1985

Numancia	0 – 4	Real Valladolid

Antiguo Los Pajaritos, Soria

Real Valladolid qualified after 4–0 victory

August 3, 1985

Real Burgos	2 – 0	Palencia

El Plantío, Burgos
August 10, 1985

Palencia	6 – 1	Real Burgos

Antigua Balastera, Palencia

Palencia won 6–3 on aggregate

August 6, 1985

Cultural Leonesa	1 – 0	UD Salamanca

La Puentecilla, León
August 11, 1985

UD Salamanca	3 – 1	Cultural Leonesa

El Helmántico, Villares de la Reina

UD Salamanca won 3–2 on aggregate

==== Semifinals ====
August 13, 1985

Real Ávila	0 – 3	Real Valladolid

Adolfo Suárez Stadium, Ávila

Real Valladolid advanced to final after 3–0 victory

August 15, 1985

Palencia	1 – 1 (a.e.t.)	Cultural Leonesa

Antigua Balastera, Palencia
August 18, 1985
Replay match

UD Salamanca	1 – 0 (a.e.t.)	Palencia

El Helmántico, Villares de la Reina

UD Salamanca advanced to final. Won 2–1 on aggregate

==== Final ====
August 25, 1985

Real Valladolid	4 – 1	UD Salamanca
Eusebio 26'; Duque 45'; Jorge 47', 60'		2' Marcelino

Nuevo José Zorrilla, Valladolid
Attendance: 8,000

== 2009–13 trophy ==
Ed.	Final host	Champion	Runner-up	Score
2009–10	Salamanca	UD Salamanca	Real Valladolid	2–1
2010–11	Ponferrada	SD Ponferradina	UD Salamanca	1–1
2011	Villaralbo	CD Mirandés	Villaralbo CF	1–0
2012	Miranda de Ebro	CD Mirandés	Real Valladolid	4–1
2013	Palencia	CD Numancia	SD Ponferradina	1–0

== Titles by team ==
Winners of the tournament:

Team	Titles	Years
Cultural Leonesa	4	1926, 1928, 1929, 1930
Real Valladolid	2	1931, 1985
CD Mirandés	2	2011, 2012
UD Salamanca (†)	1	2009–10
SD Ponferradina	1	2010–11
CD Numancia	1	2013
Real Unión Deportiva (†)	1	1927
CD Español (†)	1	1925

=== Modern trophy ===
Team	Titles	Runners-up	Years winning
CD Mirandés	2	0	2011, 2012
UD Salamanca (†)	1	1	2009–10
SD Ponferradina	1	1	2010–11
CD Numancia	1	0	2013
Real Valladolid	0	2	
Villaralbo CF	0	1	
