= List of Atlético Nacional managers =

Atlético Nacional is an association football club based in Medellín that competes in the Categoría Primera A, the top level football league in Colombia. Atlético Nacional was founded in 1947 and (as of 2017) is one of the teams never to have been relegated from the top level of Colombian football. The club has won sixteen Categoría Primera A titles, three Copa Colombia and two Superliga Colombiana.

== List of managers ==
Dates	Name
July 1948	(Colombia) Rafael Serna
September 1948 – April 1951	(Argentina) Fernando Paternoster
May 1951 – September 1952	(Colombia) Ricardo Ruiz
September 1952 – 1953	(Uruguay) José Sáule
January 1954 – May 1956	(Argentina) Fernando Paternoster
May – November 1956	(Argentina) Óscar Contreras
November 1956 – July 1957	(Argentina) Fernando Paternoster
July 1957 – November 1961	(Colombia) Ricardo Ruiz
November – December 1961	(Colombia) Julio Gaviria
January – May 1962	(Uruguay) José Etchegoyen
May – December 1962	(Uruguay) René Seghini
January – June 1963	(Colombia) Julio Gaviria
June – July 1963	(Argentina) Julio Tócker
July – December 1963	(Colombia) Julio Gaviria
January – May 1964	(Argentina) Juan Eulogio Urriolabeitía
May 1964 – October 1966	(Uruguay) Juan Hohberg
October – December 1966	(Colombia) Julio Gaviria
January – October 1967	(Colombia) Aristóbulo Deambrossi
October 1967 – May 1968	(Colombia) Ricardo Ruiz
May 1968 – October 1969	(Brazil) Santos Cristo
November 1969 – September 1970	(Colombia) Francisco Zuluaga
September 1970 – December 1972	(Argentina) José Curti
January – July 1973	(Socialist Federal Republic of Yugoslavia) Vladica Popović
July 1973 – July 1975	(Paraguay) César López Fretes
August 1975 – June 1976	(Argentina) José Curti
August 1976 – February 1982	(Argentina) Osvaldo Zubeldía
March – December 1982	(Argentina) Miguel Ángel López
1983	(Uruguay) Luis Cubilla
1984	(Colombia) Gilberto Osorio
1985	(Uruguay) Juan Mujica
1986	(Uruguay) Aníbal Ruiz
May – July 1987	(Colombia) Hugo Gallego
August 1987 – December 1990	(Colombia) Francisco Maturana
January 1991 – July 1994	(Colombia) Hernán Darío Gómez
August 1994 – August 1997	(Colombia) Juan José Pelaez
August 1997 – December 1998	(Colombia) Gabriel Gómez
January – July 1999	(Argentina) Reinaldo Merlo
July 1999 – June 2000	(Colombia) Luis Fernando Suárez
June – December 2000	(Colombia) Carlos Navarrete
January – May 2001	(Colombia) José Hernández
May 2001 – June 2002	(Colombia) Luis Fernando Montoya
July 2002 – June 2003	(Colombia) Alexis García
July 2003 – December 2004	(Colombia) Juan José Pelaez
January 2005 – March 2006	(Colombia) Santiago Escobar
March 2006 – August 2006	(Colombia) Carlos Navarrete
August 2006 – May 2008	(Argentina) Oscar Héctor Quintabani
May – September 2008	(Colombia) Gabriel Gómez
December 2008 – April 2009	(Colombia) Luis Fernando Suárez
May 2009 – April 2010	(Spain) Ramón Cabrero
May – December 2010	(Colombia) José Santa
January 2011 – April 2012	(Colombia) Santiago Escobar
May 2012 – May 2015	(Colombia) Juan Carlos Osorio
June 2015 – June 2017	(Colombia) Reinaldo Rueda
June 2017 – December 2017	(Spain) Juan Manuel Lillo
January 2018 – August 2018	(Argentina) Jorge Almirón
August 2018 - November 2018	(Colombia) Hernán Herrera
November 2018 – May 2019	(Brazil) Paulo Autuori
May 2019 – June 2019	(Colombia) Alejandro Restrepo
July 2019 – November 2020	(Colombia) Juan Carlos Osorio
November 2020 – June 2021	(Brazil) Alexandre Guimarães
June 2021 – March 2022	(Colombia) Alejandro Restrepo
March 2022 – September 2022	(Colombia) Hernán Herrera
September 2022 – October 2022	(Colombia) Pedro Sarmiento
October 2022 – July 2023	(Brazil) Paulo Autuori
July 2023 – October 2023	(Brazil) William
October 2023 – February 2024	(Colombia) Jhon Jairo Bodmer
March 2024 – August 2024	(Uruguay) Pablo Repetto
August 2024 – January 2025	(Mexico) Efraín Juárez
January 2025 – September 2025	(Argentina) Javier Gandolfi
September 2025 – June 2026	(Colombia) Diego Arias
June 2026 – Present	(Colombia) Lucas González

Source: Worldfootball.net
