= Celestino Vallejo =

Spanish football manager (born 1960)

Personal information
- Full name: Celestino Vallejo de Miguel
- Date of birth: 8 December 1960 (age 65)
- Place of birth: Valdemaluque, Spain

Managerial career
- Years: Team
- 1992–2001: Numancia (assistant)
- 2001: Numancia
- 2003–2004: Guadalajara

Celestino Vallejo de Miguel (born 8 December 1960) is a Spanish football manager.

== Football career ==
Born in Valdemaluque, Soria, Castile and León, Vallejo began his career at local CD Numancia, working as an assistant manager for nearly ten years. On 10 May 2001 he was appointed first team manager, with the club seriously threatened with relegation in La Liga.

Despite suffering relegation, Vallejo was maintained in charge of the club. On 26 November 2001, after suffering a 1–5 heavy loss against Burgos CF, he was sacked.

In 2003 Vallejo was appointed at the helm of CD Guadalajara, in Tercera División. After one full campaign, he started working as a director of football.
