= David Cordón =

Spanish footballer

Personal information
- Full name: David Cordón Mesa
- Date of birth: 12 November 1975 (age 50)
- Place of birth: Madrid, Spain
- Height: 1.83 m (6 ft 0 in)
- Position: Left-back

Youth career
- Atlético Madrid

Senior career*
Years	Team	Apps	(Gls)
1993–1997	Atlético Madrid B	109	(5)
1997–1999	Sevilla	28	(0)
1999–2000	Recreativo	27	(0)
2000–2002	Cartagonova	54	(2)
2002–2003	Eibar	7	(0)
2003	Cacereño	19	(1)
2003–2004	Zamora	24	(1)
2004–2005	Real Unión	17	(0)
2005	Zamora	0	(0)
2005–2006	Pinatar		
2006	Móstoles	11	(0)
2006–2007	Cobeña	36	(0)
2007–2010	Villaralbo		
Total		332	(9)

International career
1991–1992	Spain U16	10	(0)
1994	Spain U18	7	(0)
1995	Spain U19	2	(0)
1995	Spain U20	6	(0)
1996	Spain U21	2	(0)
- * Club domestic league appearances and goals

David Cordón Mesa (12 November 1975) is a Spanish former professional footballer who played as a left-back.

== Club career ==
Born in Madrid, Cordón appeared in 96 Segunda División games in five seasons, with Atlético Madrid B, Sevilla FC, Recreativo de Huelva and SD Eibar. He scored both of his goals with the first of those clubs, first in a 3–2 loss away to CP Mérida on 3 November 1996 and, the following 23 February, in a 1–0 home win over UE Lleida.

Additionally, Cordón made one appearance for Atlético's first team, in a 2–1 victory against UD Almería in the second round of the Copa del Rey as the tournament ended in victory. He spent his later career in the lower leagues and amateur football, retiring in 2010 aged 34.

== International career ==
Cordón was part of the Spain squad at the 1995 FIFA World Youth Championship, taking part in all the matches in a fourth-place finish in Qatar.

== Honours ==
Atlético Madrid

- Copa del Rey: 1995–96
