= Óscar Contreras =

Spanish footballer

Personal information
- Full name: Óscar Contreras Ferreira
- Date of birth: 3 December 1997 (age 28)
- Place of birth: Ponferrada, Spain
- Position: Attacking midfielder

Team information
- Current team: Atlético Bembibre
- Number: 10

Youth career
- Ca La Guidó
- Atlético Bembibre

Senior career*
Years	Team	Apps	(Gls)
2015–2019	Atlético Bembibre	106	(13)
2019–2022	Ponferradina B	68	(24)
2020	Ponferradina	1	(0)
2022–	Atlético Bembibre	24	(2)
- * Club domestic league appearances and goals as of 11 March 2023

Óscar Contreras Ferreira (born 3 December 1997) is a Spanish footballer who plays for CA Bembibre as an attacking midfielder.

== Club career ==
Born in Ponferrada, Castile and León, Contreras represented AD Ca La Guidó and CA Bembibre as a youth. After making his first-team debut during the 2015–16 season in the Tercera División, he subsequently became a regular for the side.

In June 2019, Contreras signed for SD Ponferradina and was initially assigned to the reserves in the regional leagues. He made his debut as a professional on 20 July of the following year, coming on as a late substitute for goalscorer Iván Rodríguez in a 1–2 away loss against Real Zaragoza in the Segunda División.
