= Manuel García Calderón =

Spanish football manager

Personal information
- Full name: Manuel García Calderón García Rama
- Date of birth: 28 September 1953 (age 73)
- Place of birth: Madrid, Spain

Managerial career
- Years: Team
- Real Madrid (youth)
- 1987–1989: Toledo
- 1992–1993: Numancia
- 1995: San Fernando
- 1996: Toledo
- 1996–1997: Huesca
- 1997–1998: Getafe
- 1998–1999: Algeciras
- 2002: Alcorcón
- 2005: Móstoles
- 2006–2007: Illescas
- 2008–2009: Getafe B
- 2014–: Móstoles B

Manuel García Calderón García Rama (born 28 September 1953) is a Spanish football manager, currently in charge of CD Móstoles B.

== Managerial career ==
Born in Madrid, García Calderón made his managerial debuts with Real Madrid's youth system. In 1996, he was appointed CD Toledo manager in Segunda División, after previous stints at CD Numancia and CD San Fernando; while in charge he only suffered two defeats, and his side finished 9th.

In August 1997, after suffering team relegation with SD Huesca, García Calderón was named Getafe CF manager. He was relieved from his duties in April of the following year, after losing his last three games.

García Calderón subsequently managed Algeciras CF, AD Alcorcón and CD Móstoles, all in Segunda División B. On 28 June 2006 he was appointed at the helm of CD Illescas, being sacked on 7 November of the following year.

On 18 June 2008 García Calderón returned to his former club Getafe, being appointed manager of the reserves. He was relieved from his duties on 9 January 2009, after achieving five consecutive defeats.

In 2014 García Calderón was named manager of the newly formed CD Móstoles B.
