= José Antonio Saro =

Spanish footballer and coach

Personal information
- Full name: José Antonio Saro Palleiro
- Date of birth: 10 January 1938 (age 88)
- Place of birth: Santander, Spain
- Position: Winger

Youth career
- 1954–1955: Racing Santander

Senior career*
Years	Team	Apps	(Gls)
1955–1959	Rayo Cantabria		
1959–1960	Gimnástica Torrelavega		
1960–1961	Celta Vigo	6	(0)
1961–1965	Salamanca	50	(5)
1965–1966	Murcia	4	(1)

Managerial career
- 1966–1968: Cayón
- Rayo Cantabria
- Textil Escudo
- 1975–1976: Laredo
- 1976–1977: Naval
- 1977–1978: Rayo Cantabria
- 1978–1980: Santoña
- 1980–1984: Racing Ferrol
- 1987–1989: Ponferradina
- 1989–1991: Numancia
- 1996–1997: Gimnásica Torrelavega
- 1999–2001: Ponferradina
- 2003–2004: Deportivo Rayo Cantabria
- * Club domestic league appearances and goals

José Antonio Saro Palleiro (born 10 January 1938) is a Spanish retired footballer who played as a winger, and a current coach.

== Playing career ==
Born in Santander, Cantabria, Saro joined Racing de Santander in 1954, aged 16, but only appeared as a senior with the reserves. In 1959, after suffering a serious knee injury and being released, he joined Gimnástica de Torrelavega.

In the 1960 summer Saro moved to Segunda División with Celta de Vigo. He made his professional debut on 25 September, starting in a 2–0 away win against UD Salamanca.

Saro subsequently suffered another injury while at Celta, and after appearing sparingly signed for Salamanca also in the second level. In 1965 he joined fellow league team Real Murcia, retiring with the latter in 1966.

== Post-playing career ==
Immediately after retiring Saro was appointed manager of CD Cayón. After spells at Rayo Cantabria, SD Textil Escudo, CD Laredo, Santoña CF and CD Naval, he was named Racing de Ferrol manager in 1980.

Saro left the Galicians in 1984, and was appointed at the helm of SD Ponferradina three years later. In October 1989, shortly after being sacked by the latter, he took charge of CD Numancia, leaving the club in the following year.

Saro was also in charge of Gimnástica de Torrelavega for the 1996–97 campaign, before returning to Ponfe in 1999. He was sacked by the latter on 5 March 2001.
