= CD Íscar =

Spanish football team

Íscar
- Full name: Club Deportivo Íscar
- Founded: 1968
- Ground: San Miguel, Íscar, Castile and León, Spain
- Capacity: 2,000
- Chairman: Juan Romo Del Bosque
- President: Santiago Pascual
- League: Segunda Provincial – Valladolid
- 2025–26: Segunda Provincial – Valladolid, 7th of 16
- Website: https://cdiscar.com
| Home colours | Away colours |

Club Deportivo Íscar is a Spanish football team based in Íscar, in the autonomous community of Castile and León. Founded in 1968, they play in Segunda Provincial – Valladolid, holding their home matches at Estadio Municipal San Miguel, with a capacity of 2,000 seats.

== History ==
=== Club background ===
- Club Deportivo Íscar Industrial (1968–2004)
- Club Deportivo Jher Íscar (2004–2007)
- Club Deportivo Los Gatos de Íscar (2007–2015)
- Club Deportivo Íscar (2021–)

== Season to season ==
| Season | Tier | Division | Place | Copa del Rey |
|---|---|---|---|---|
| 1968–69 | 5 | 2ª Reg. | 1st | |
| 1969–70 | 4 | 1ª Reg. | 2nd | |
| 1970–71 | 5 | 1ª Reg. | 1st | |
| 1971–72 | 4 | Reg. Pref. | 7th | |
| 1972–73 | 4 | Reg. Pref. | 12th | |
| 1973–74 | 4 | Reg. Pref. | 18th | |
| 1974–75 | 5 | 1ª Reg. | 12th | |
| 1975–76 | 5 | 1ª Reg. | 4th | |
| 1976–77 | 5 | 1ª Reg. | 9th | |
| 1977–78 | 6 | 1ª Reg. | 11th | |
| 1978–79 | 6 | 1ª Reg. | 5th | |
| 1979–80 | 6 | 1ª Reg. | 17th | |
| 1980–81 | 6 | 1ª Reg. | 7th | |
| 1981–82 | 6 | 1ª Reg. | 16th | |
| 1982–83 | 5 | Reg. Pref. | 13th | |
| 1983–84 | 5 | Reg. Pref. | 15th | |
| 1984–85 | 5 | Reg. Pref. | 17th | |
| 1985–86 | 6 | 1ª Reg. | 3rd | |
| 1986–87 | 6 | 1ª Reg. | 3rd | |
| 1987–88 | 5 | Reg. Pref. | 15th | |

| Season | Tier | Division | Place | Copa del Rey |
|---|---|---|---|---|
| 1988–89 | 5 | Reg. Pref. | 14th | |
| 1989–90 | 5 | Reg. Pref. | 13th | |
| 1990–91 | 6 | 1ª Reg. | 2nd | |
| 1991–92 | 6 | 1ª Reg. | 1st | |
| 1992–93 | 5 | Reg. Pref. | 5th | |
| 1993–94 | 5 | Reg. Pref. | 2nd | |
| 1994–95 | 4 | 3ª | 12th | |
| 1995–96 | 4 | 3ª | 17th | |
| 1996–97 | 4 | 3ª | 19th | |
| 1997–98 | 6 | 1ª Reg. | 6th | |
| 1998–99 | 6 | 1ª Reg. | 1st | |
| 1999–2000 | 5 | 1ª Reg. | 11th | |
| 2000–01 | 5 | 1ª Reg. | 5th | |
| 2001–02 | 5 | 1ª Reg. | 5th | |
| 2002–03 | 5 | 1ª Reg. | 3rd | |
| 2003–04 | 5 | 1ª Reg. | 1st | |
| 2004–05 | 4 | 3ª | 13th | |
| 2005–06 | 4 | 3ª | 13th | |
| 2006–07 | 4 | 3ª | 16th | |
| 2007–08 | 4 | 3ª | 12th | |

| Season | Tier | Division | Place | Copa del Rey |
|---|---|---|---|---|
| 2008–09 | 4 | 3ª | 11th | |
| 2009–10 | 4 | 3ª | 10th | |
| 2010–11 | 4 | 3ª | 8th | |
| 2011–12 | 4 | 3ª | 8th | |
| 2012–13 | DNP | | | |
| 2013–14 | 7 | 2ª Prov. | 1st | |
| 2014–15 | 6 | 1ª Prov. | 3rd | |
| 2015–2021 | DNP | | | |
| 2021–22 | 9 | 3ª Prov. | 2nd | |
| 2022–23 | 9 | 3ª Prov. | 2nd | |
| 2023–24 | 8 | 2ª Prov. | 6th | |
| 2024–25 | 8 | 2ª Prov. | 8th | |
| 2025–26 | 8 | 2ª Prov. | 7th | |
| 2026–27 | 8 | 2ª Prov. | | |

- 11 seasons in Tercera División

== Current squad ==
As of 5 October 2026

Note: Flags indicate national team as defined under FIFA eligibility rules; some limited exceptions apply. Players may hold more than one non-FIFA nationality.

| No. | Pos. | Nation | Player |
|---|---|---|---|
| 1 | GK | | Arturo Llorente Yuguero |
| 2 | DF | | José García Sanchéz |
| 3 | DF | | David Martín De Frutos |
| 4 | DF | | Iván Marcos Galindo |
| 5 | DF | | José A. García Gallardo |
| 15 | DF | | Manuel Sanguino Martín |
| 17 | DF | | Víctor González Rico |
| 6 | MF | | Víctor Albertos Alonso |
| 8 | MF | | Joaquín Osorno Sangrador |
| 12 | MF | | Fabio Sanz Del Carmen |
| 14 | MF | | Valentín Cisneros Valcarcel |
| 19 | MF | | Samuel Cisneros Valcarcel |
| 21 | MF | | Roberto Velayos Conejero |
| 7 | FW | | David Aranda Herrero |
| 9 | FW | | Jesús García Sánchez |
| 10 | FW | | Daniel Alonso García |
| 11 | FW | | Carlos Juárez Domínguez |
| 18 | FW | | Roberto Ruano Gutiérrez |

== Notable former players ==
- (Equatorial Guinea) Benjamín
- (Spain) Víctor Andrés
