= Benjamín Zarandona =

Equatoguinean footballer (born 1976)

Benjamín
Personal information
- Full name: Benjamín Zarandona Esono
- Date of birth: 2 March 1976 (age 50)
- Place of birth: Valladolid, Spain
- Height: 1.84 m (6 ft 1/2 in)
- Position: Midfielder

Youth career
- Valladolid

Senior career*
Years	Team	Apps	(Gls)
1994–1996	Valladolid B	30	(6)
1995–1998	Valladolid	86	(11)
1998–2007	Betis	170	(9)
2005–2006	→ Cádiz (loan)	14	(0)
2007	Xerez	2	(0)
2008–2010	Palencia	13	(1)
2011–2012	Íscar	16	(0)
2012	Cuéllar Balompié	1	(0)
Total		332	(27)

International career
1997–1998	Spain U21	3	(2)
1997	Spain U23	3	(0)
2006–2009	Equatorial Guinea	10	(0)
- * Club domestic league appearances and goals

Benjamín Zarandona Esono (born 2 March 1976), known simply as Benjamín, is a former professional footballer who played as a midfielder.

He spent most of his professional career in Spain, notably with Betis where he remained nine years, winning one Copa del Rey and appearing in 194 competitive games. Over 12 seasons, he amassed La Liga totals of 244 matches and 18 goals, also representing in the competition Valladolid and Cádiz.

Born in Spain, Benjamín was a member of the Equatorial Guinea national team.

== Club career ==
=== Valladolid ===
Born in Valladolid, Castile and León, Benjamín began his career with Real Valladolid, playing initially for their reserves in the Segunda División B. His first-team debut took place on 2 April 1995 in a 3–0 away loss to Real Sociedad, and he made a further nine La Liga appearances during that season.

The highlight of Benjamín's career at the Estadio José Zorrilla was helping the club to qualify for the 1997–98 UEFA Cup as seventh in the league, scoring home braces against CD Logroñés (2–1) and Valencia CF (4–1).

=== Betis ===
Benjamín joined Real Betis in summer 1998, being at the time Valladolid's most expensive transfer ever at 10.7 million pesetas. He played 28 games in his first year with four appearances in the team's UEFA Cup run, netting twice. Additionally, he spent the 2000–01 campaign helping the Andalusians to achieve promotion from Segunda División, alongside neighbours Sevilla FC.

After 26 league matches in 2004–05, as Betis achieved qualification for the UEFA Champions League and lifted the Copa del Rey, Benjamín went on loan to Cádiz CF for the 2005–06 season, and his role at the former would gradually lose importance onwards: he was unregistered for over a year, and a mutual termination of his contract was later agreed.

=== Later years ===
Benjamín joined second-tier side Xerez CD for 2007–08, but lasted only a few months, being released. In September 2008, he signed with CF Palencia from Tercera División, continuing to compete in amateur football until his retirement in June 2013.

== International career ==
In 1998, Benjamín helped Spain under-21s to win the UEFA European Championship. However, he switched allegiance in 2004 and, as his younger brother Iván who also played for Valladolid, opted to represent Equatorial Guinea.

== Personal life ==
Benjamín's father was Basque, and his mother was from Equatorial Guinea. Despite his Basque parentage, he was never approached by Athletic Bilbao nor did he play for Euskadi.

== Honours ==
Betis

- Copa del Rey: 2004–05

Spain U21

- UEFA European Under-21 Championship: 1998
