= Jesús Tartilán =

Spanish footballer and coach

Personal information
- Full name: Jesús Tartilán Requejo
- Date of birth: 2 August 1940
- Place of birth: Lugo, Spain
- Date of death: 19 March 2024 (aged 83)
- Position: Midfielder

Youth career
- Ponferradina

Senior career*
Years	Team	Apps	(Gls)
1960–1961	Ponferradina	1	(0)
1961–1963	Betis	0	(0)
1962–1963	→ Cultural Leonesa (loan)		
1963–1964	Cádiz	1	(0)
1964–1965	Espanyol	2	(0)
1965–1966	Hospitalet	9	(0)
1966–1967	Ponferradina	2	(0)
1967–1968	Melilla		
1968–1969	Cleveland Stokers	29	(0)

Managerial career
- 1978–1979: Cacabelense
- 1979–1982: Cultural Leonesa
- 1985–1986: Ponferradina
- 1988: Racing Ferrol
- 1989–1991: Ponferradina
- 1991: Numancia
- 1992–1993: Atlético Madrid B
- 1993–1994: Ponferradina
- 1998–2000: Ponferradina
- 2001: Ponferradina
- 2007: Ponferradina
- 2009: Ponferradina
- * Club domestic league appearances and goals

Jesús Tartilán Requejo (2 August 1940 – 19 March 2024) was a Spanish retired footballer who played as a midfielder, and a coach.

== Playing career ==
Born in Lugo, Galicia, Tartilán was a SD Ponferradina youth graduate, and made his senior debuts in 1960. In the following year, he moved to Real Betis in La Liga, but failed to appear in any official matches for the club, being also loaned to Cultural y Deportiva Leonesa in 1962.

In 1963, Tartilán moved to Segunda División with Cádiz CF. He made his professional debut on 23 February 1964, starting in a 1–2 away loss against CA Ceuta; it was his maiden appearance for the club.

In the summer of 1964 Tartilán joined RCD Espanyol and made his top level debut on 7 February 1965, playing the full 90 minutes in a 4–2 home win against Real Zaragoza. He left the Pericos in June, and subsequently represented CE L'Hospitalet, Ponferradina, UD Melilla and Cleveland Stokers, retiring with the latter in 1969.

== Post-playing career ==
Tartilán started his managerial career at UD Cacabelense in 1978, and was also at the helm of Cultural Leonesa in the following year. With the latter, he remained three seasons in Segunda División B, until being sacked in 1982.

Tartilán was subsequently manager of SD Ponferradina in seven occasions, only split by a spell at CD Numancia in 1991.

== Death ==
Tartilán died on 19 March 2024 at the age of 83 after a long illness.
