= Julio Edgar Gaviria =

Colombian footballer (1945-2009)

Personal information
- Full name: Julio Edgar Gaviria Arenas
- Date of birth: 1 April 1945
- Place of birth: Medellín, Colombia
- Date of death: March 30, 2009 (aged 63)
- Place of death: Medellín, Colombia
- Position: Defender

Senior career*
Years	Team	Apps	(Gls)
1968–1978	Millonarios		
1979–1981	América de Cali		

International career
1967–1970	Colombia		
- * Club domestic league appearances and goals

Julio Edgar Gaviria Arenas (1 April 1945 – 30 March 2009) was a Colombian footballer.

== Club career ==
Gaviria was the son of former goalkeeper Julio "Chonto" Gaviria. He played as a defender for several clubs in Colombia, including Millonarios and América de Cali, where he won championships in 1972 and 1979.

== International career ==
Gaviria also made appearances for the Colombia national football team, and was selected to play at the South American Championship 1967.

== Death ==
Gaviria died in Medellín on 30 March 2009.

== Honors ==
- Colombian Championship: 1972, 1979
