= CD Aguilar =

Spanish football team

Aguilar
- Full name: Club Deportivo Aguilar
- Founded: 1947
- Dissolved: 2014
- Ground: Alberto Fernández; Aguilar de Campoo, Castile and León, Spain
- Capacity: 6,000
- Chairman: Fermín Olmo
- Manager: Luis Sierra
- 2013–14: Primera Provincial – Palencia, 10th of 20
Home colours	Away colours

Club Deportivo Aguilar was a football team based in Aguilar de Campoo in the autonomous community of Castile and León. Founded in 1947 and dissolved in 2014, they last played in the Primera Provincial – Palencia. Its stadium is Ciudad Deportiva Alberto Fernández with a capacity of 6,000 seats.

== Season to season ==
Season	Tier	Division	Place	Copa del Rey
1969–70	5	2ª Reg.	2nd	
1970–71	5	1ª Reg.	4th	
1971–72	5	1ª Reg.	5th	
1972–73	5	1ª Reg.	3rd	
1973–74	5	1ª Reg.	2nd	
1974–75	5	1ª Reg.	2nd	
1975–76	5	1ª Reg.	4th	
1976–77	5	1ª Reg.	2nd	
1977–78	6	1ª Reg.	1st	
1978–79	5	Reg. Pref.	17th	
1979–80	6	1ª Reg.	2nd	
1980–81	5	Reg. Pref.	14th	
1981–82	5	Reg. Pref.	8th	
1982–83	5	Reg. Pref.	17th	
1983–84	6	1ª Reg.	8th	
1984–85	6	1ª Reg.	2nd	
1985–86	6	1ª Reg.	3rd	
1986–87	6	1ª Reg.	2nd	
1987–88	6	1ª Reg.	1st	
1988–89	5	Reg. Pref.	14th	

Season	Tier	Division	Place	Copa del Rey
1989–90	5	Reg. Pref.	1st	
1990–91	4	3ª	20th	
1991–92	5	Reg. Pref.	6th	
1992–93	5	Reg. Pref.	1st	
1993–94	4	3ª	19th	
1994–95	5	Reg. Pref.	6th	
1995–96	5	Reg. Pref.	13th	
1996–97	5	Reg. Pref.	5th	
1997–98	5	Reg. Pref.	5th	
1998–99	5	Reg. Pref.	14th	
1999–2000	5	1ª Reg.	7th	
2000–01	5	1ª Reg.	6th	
2001–02	5	1ª Reg.	1st	
2002–03	4	3ª	20th	
2003–04	5	1ª Reg.	15th	
2004–05	5	1ª Reg.	3rd	
2005–06	5	1ª Reg.	10th	
2006–07	5	1ª Reg.	14th	
2007–08	5	1ª Reg.	1st	
2008–09	4	3ª	9th	

Season	Tier	Division	Place	Copa del Rey
2009–10	4	3ª	17th	
2010–11	4	3ª	13th	
2011–12	4	3ª	17th	
2012–13	6	1ª Prov.	1st	
2013–14	6	1ª Prov.	10th	

- 7 seasons in Tercera División
