= Valdemaluque =

- Municipality
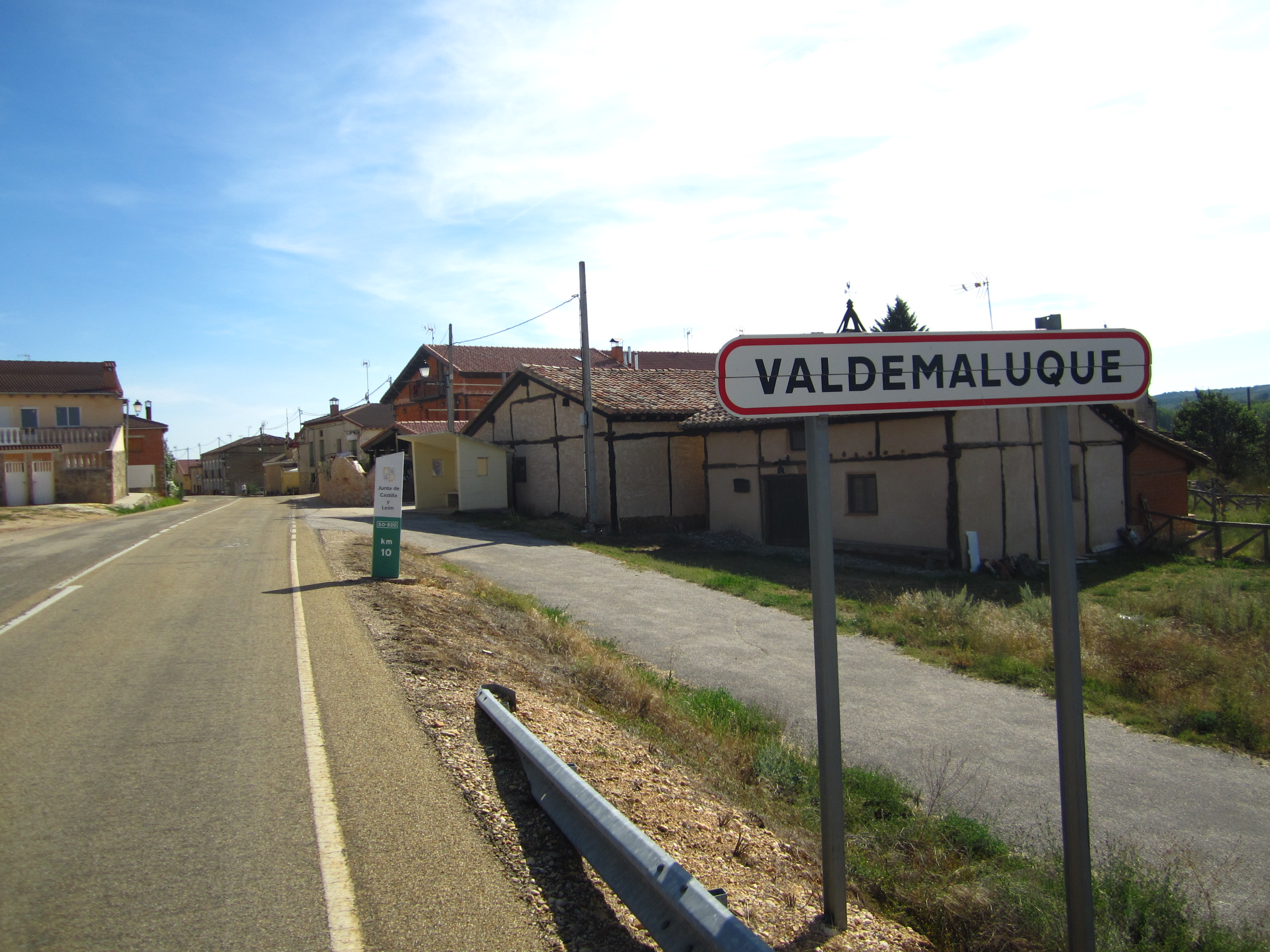

- Location in Spain. Valdemaluque (Spain)
- Coordinates: 41°40′24″N 3°02′43″W
- Country: Spain
- Autonomous community: Castile and León
- Province: Soria
- Municipality: Valdemaluque

Area
  - Total: 62 km^{2} (24 sq mi)

Population (2025-01-01)
  - Total: 139
  - Density: 2.2/km^{2} (5.8/sq mi)
- Time zone: UTC+1 (CET)
  - Summer (DST): UTC+2 (CEST)
- Website: Official website

Valdemaluque is a municipality located in the province of Soria, Castile and León, Spain. According to the 2004 census (INE), the municipality has a population of 251 inhabitants.
