= CD La Granja =

Association football club in Spain

La Granja
- Full name: Club Deportivo La Granja
- Founded: 1948
- Dissolved: 2023
- Ground: El Hospital, La Granja, Castile and León, Spain
- Capacity: 2,000
- Chairman: (Spain) Pablo Alejandro Simal
- Manager: (Spain) Carlos Fonseca
- 2022–23: Primera Regional – Group A, 16th of 17
Home colours	Away colours

Club Deportivo La Granja was a football team based in La Granja in the autonomous community of Castile and León. Founded in 1948 and dissolved in 2023, they last played in the Primera Regional – Group A. Its stadium is El Hospital with a capacity of 2,000 seats.

== Season to season ==
Season	Tier	Division	Place	Copa del Rey
1976–77	8	3ª Reg.	7th	
1977–78	DNP			
1978–79	8	3ª Reg. P.	2nd	
1979–80	7	2ª Reg.	14th	
1980–81	7	2ª Reg.	7th	
1981–82	7	2ª Reg.	10th	
1982–83	7	2ª Reg.	1st	
1983–84	6	1ª Reg.	9th	
1984–85	6	1ª Reg.	14th	
1985–86	6	1ª Reg.	16th	
1986–87	5	Reg. Pref.	11th	
1987–88	5	Reg. Pref.	19th	
1988–89	6	1ª Reg.	2nd	
1989–90	6	1ª Reg.	5th	
1990–91	6	1ª Reg.	2nd	
1991–92	6	1ª Reg.	2nd	
1992–93	5	Reg. Pref.	13th	
1993–94	5	Reg. Pref.	3rd	
1994–95	5	Reg. Pref.	8th	
1995–96	5	Reg. Pref.	9th	

Season	Tier	Division	Place	Copa del Rey
1996–97	5	Reg. Pref.	9th	
1997–98	5	Reg. Pref.	10th	
1998–99	5	Reg. Pref.	12th	
1999–2000	5	1ª Reg.	8th	
2000–01	5	1ª Reg.	9th	
2001–02	5	1ª Reg.	11th	
2002–03	5	1ª Reg.	14th	
2003–04	5	1ª Reg.	11th	
2004–05	5	1ª Reg.	2nd	
2005–06	5	1ª Reg.	1st	
2006–07	4	3ª	11th	
2007–08	4	3ª	14th	
2008–09	4	3ª	14th	
2009–10	4	3ª	19th	
2010–11	5	1ª Reg.	1st	
2011–12	4	3ª	11th	
2012–13	4	3ª	6th	
2013–14	4	3ª	11th	
2014–15	4	3ª	18th	
2015–16	5	1ª Reg.	4th	

Season	Tier	Division	Place	Copa del Rey
2016–17	5	1ª Reg.	3rd	
2017–18	5	1ª Reg.	2nd	
2018–19	4	3ª	17th	
2019–20	4	3ª	21st	
2020–21	4	3ª	21st	
2021–22	6	1ª Reg.	7th	
2022–23	6	1ª Reg.	16th	

- 11 seasons in Tercera División
