= CD Numancia =

Spanish professional football club

Numancia
- Full name: Club Deportivo Numancia de Soria, S.A.D.
- Nicknames: Numantinos; Rojillos (Reds)
- Founded: 9 April 1945; 81 years ago
- Stadium: Los Pajaritos
- Capacity: 8,261
- Owner: Sociedad Farlay S.A.
- President: Patricio de Pedro
- Head coach: Lolo Escobar
- League: Segunda Federación – Group 5
- 2025–26: Segunda Federación – Group 1, 3rd of 18
- Website: www.cdnumancia.com
Home colours	Away colours

Club Deportivo Numancia de Soria, S.A.D. is a Spanish football club in Soria, in the autonomous community of Castile and León. Founded on 9 April 1945, it plays in Segunda Federación – Group 5, holding home games at Nuevo Estadio Los Pajaritos.

Besides football it had other departments in sports, such as volleyball, women's handball, and rhythmic gymnastics.

== History ==
The club was founded on 9 April 1945. Numancia was named after the ancient Celtiberian town of Numantia, near where Soria would be later founded. Having spent a long time in the Tercera División, the club made consistent progress, reaching the first division on three occasions: 1999, 2004 and 2008.

The club became first widely known in Spain in 1995–96, while still playing at the third level, for its extraordinary run in the Spanish Cup, eliminating three top flight clubs (Real Sociedad, Racing de Santander and Sporting de Gijón) and only being knocked out in the quarter-finals by Barcelona, after Numancia drew in the first leg and took the lead in the second.

Numancia's most important milestone came in 1999, when the team managed to promote to La Liga for the first time. In the 1998–99 season, Numancia finished third in Segunda, only behind Málaga CF and Atlético Madrid B, meaning the promotion to the top tier. Their first ever season in the Spanish elite proved to be challenging. Numancia eventually finished 17th, thus avoiding an immediate relegation to Segunda. Their survival was made possible because of unexpectedly good home results. Numancia won 9 home games, drew 6, and lost only 4 games at home. Their second season in the elite was less successful, as the team finished in last place. Numancia again displayed strong results at home, winning eight of their ten wins at home. However, that was eventually not enough to avoid a drop to Segunda, after a two-year spell in La Liga.

Numancia spent three seasons in Segunda Division, before promotion again after the 2003–04 season, as the club finished third. Numancia'second spell in the Spanish top tier was not successful as it only won 6 games. This meant that relegation followed just one season after.

Following another three years in Segunda, Numancia came back to La Liga for season 2008–09. Following a 1–3 loss at Sporting de Gijón on 2 November 2008, Numancia had conceded a total of 200 goals in the top division in slightly more than three seasons, reaching 44th in the all-time list. It battled bravely against relegation, but eventually returned to level two after just one year, as second from bottom, even though the season had started on a high note with a 1–0 home win against eventual champions Barcelona.

Numancia was relegated to third division followed at the end of the 2019–20 season after 23 years playing between first and second division. On the next season, due to restructuring of the Spanish football league system, Numancia failed to survive in the third-tier and was relegated to the newly fourth-tier Segunda División RFEF, for the 2021–22 season, where the club achieved promoted back to newly third division for 2022–23 season.

== Honours ==
- Segunda División: 2007–08
- Castilla y León Cup: 2013

== Season to season ==
Season	Tier	Division	Place	Copa del Rey
1945–46	4	1ª Reg.	2nd	
1946–47	3	3ª	4th	
1947–48	3	3ª	11th	Third round
1948–49	3	3ª	3rd	Second round
1949–50	2	2ª	13th	First round
1950–51	2	2ª	17th	
1951–52	3	3ª	13th	
1952–53	3	3ª	6th	
1953–54	3	3ª	12th	
1954–55	3	3ª	3rd	
1955–56	3	3ª	7th	
1956–57	3	3ª	9th	
1957–58	3	3ª	5th	
1958–59	3	3ª	7th	
1959–60	3	3ª	15th	
1960–61	3	3ª	3rd	
1961–62	3	3ª	1st	
1962–63	3	3ª	1st	
1963–64	3	3ª	2nd	
1964–65	3	3ª	3rd	

Season	Tier	Division	Place	Copa del Rey
1965–66	3	3ª	1st	
1966–67	3	3ª	15th	
1967–68	3	3ª	6th	
1968–69	3	3ª	14th	
1969–70	3	3ª	12th	First round
1970–71	4	Reg. Pref.	16th	
1971–72	5	1ª Reg.	1st	
1972–73	4	Reg. Pref.	10th	
1973–74	4	Reg. Pref.	13th	
1974–75	4	Reg. Pref.	15th	
1975–76	4	Reg. Pref.	15th	
1976–77	4	Reg. Pref.	12th	
1977–78	5	Reg. Pref.	1st	
1978–79	4	3ª	5th	First round
1979–80	4	3ª	14th	First round
1980–81	4	3ª	13th	
1981–82	4	3ª	4th	
1982–83	4	3ª	7th	First round
1983–84	4	3ª	2nd	
1984–85	4	3ª	8th	First round

Season	Tier	Division	Place	Copa del Rey
1985–86	4	3ª	11th	
1986–87	4	3ª	8th	
1987–88	4	3ª	4th	
1988–89	4	3ª	1st	
1989–90	3	2ª B	13th	
1990–91	3	2ª B	11th	Third round
1991–92	3	2ª B	10th	First round
1992–93	3	2ª B	8th	Third round
1993–94	3	2ª B	3rd	First round
1994–95	3	2ª B	2nd	Second round
1995–96	3	2ª B	8th	Quarter-finals
1996–97	3	2ª B	2nd	
1997–98	2	2ª	17th	Second round
1998–99	2	2ª	3rd	Third round
1999–2000	1	1ª	17th	First round
2000–01	1	1ª	20th	Round of 32
2001–02	2	2ª	17th	Round of 64
2002–03	2	2ª	14th	Round of 16
2003–04	2	2ª	3rd	Round of 64
2004–05	1	1ª	19th	Quarter-finals

Season	Tier	Division	Place	Copa del Rey
2005–06	2	2ª	8th	Third round
2006–07	2	2ª	8th	Second round
2007–08	2	2ª	1st	Second round
2008–09	1	1ª	19th	Round of 32
2009–10	2	2ª	8th	Second round
2010–11	2	2ª	10th	Second round
2011–12	2	2ª	10th	Third round
2012–13	2	2ª	12th	Second round
2013–14	2	2ª	13th	Second round
2014–15	2	2ª	12th	Third round
2015–16	2	2ª	10th	Second round
2016–17	2	2ª	17th	Second round
2017–18	2	2ª	6th	Round of 16
2018–19	2	2ª	17th	Second round
2019–20	2	2ª	20th	First round
2020–21	3	2ª B	4th / 3rd	Second round
2021–22	4	2ª RFEF	1st	
2022–23	3	1ª Fed.	16th	Second round
2023–24	4	2ª Fed.	3rd	
2024–25	4	2ª Fed.	2nd	First round

Season	Tier	Division	Place	Copa del Rey
2025–26	4	2ª Fed.	3rd	Second round
2025–26	4	2ª Fed.		TBD

- 4 seasons in La Liga
- 21 seasons in Segunda División
- 1 season in Primera Federación
- 9 seasons in Segunda División B
- 5 seasons in Segunda Federación/Segunda División RFEF
- 33 seasons in Tercera División
- 9 seasons in Categorías Regionales

== Current squad ==
The numbers are established according to the official website: www.cdnumancia.com and www.lfp.es

As of 4 February 2026.

Note: Flags indicate national team as defined under FIFA eligibility rules; some limited exceptions apply. Players may hold more than one non-FIFA nationality.

No.	Pos.	Nation	Player
1	GK	ESP	Miguel Ángel Abad
2	DF	ESP	Marcos Sánchez
3	DF	ESP	Javi Bonilla
4	DF	AND	Ian Olivera
5	DF	ESP	Óscar de Frutos
6	MF	ESP	Néstor Lucas
7	FW	ESP	Hugo Matos
8	MF	SEN	Mouhamadou Gning
9	FW	ESP	Jonatan González
10	FW	COL	Juancho
11	FW	ESP	Héctor Peña
12	MF	ESP	Pablo Álvarez (on loan from Real Avilés)
13	GK	ESP	Iván Martínez

No.	Pos.	Nation	Player
14	FW	ESP	Álex Gil
15	DF	ESP	Iker San Vicente
16	DF	ESP	Carlos Gutiérrez
17	DF	ESP	Alain García
18	DF	ECU	Luis Quiñónez (on loan from Independiente Juniors)
19	FW	ESP	Dani García
20	MF	ECU	Hans Peralta (on loan from Independiente Juniors)
21	MF	ESP	Cristian Delgado
22	DF	ESP	Fermín Ruiz
23	MF	GEQ	Jannick Buyla
24	FW	ESP	Álex Escardó
30	GK	UKR	Oleg Oliynyk
—	DF	ESP	Gexan Elosegi

== Coaches ==
- (Spain) José Antonio Saro (1989–90)
- (Spain) Jesús Tartilán (1991)
- (Spain) Manuel García Calderón (1992–93)
- (Spain) Miguel Ángel Lotina (1993–96)
- (Spain) Paco Herrera (1998)
- (Spain) Miguel Ángel Lotina (1998–99)
- (Spain) Andoni Goikoetxea (1999–00)
- (Spain) Paco Herrera (2000)
- (Spain) Mariano García Remón (2000–01)
- (Spain) Celestino Vallejo (2001)
- (Spain) Luis Sánchez Duque (2001–02)
- (Spain) Manuel Sarabia (2002)
- (Spain) Máximo Hernández (2002–03)
- (Spain) Quique Hernández (2003–04)
- (Spain) Francisco (2004–05)
- (Spain) Máximo Hernández (2004–05)
- (Spain) Enrique Martín (2005)
- (Spain) Andoni Goikoetxea (2005–07)
- (Spain) Gonzalo Arconada (2007–08)
- (Croatia) Sergio Krešić (2008–09)
- (Spain) Pacheta (2009)
- (Spain) Gonzalo Arconada (2009–10)
- (Spain) Juan Carlos Unzué (2010–11)
- (Spain) Pablo Machín (2011–13)
- (Spain) Juan Antonio Anquela (2013–15)
- (Spain) Jagoba Arrasate (2015–2018)
- (Spain) Aritz López Garai (2018–)

== See also ==
- CD Numancia B, reserve team.
