= CD Villaralbo =

Spanish football team

Villaralbo
- Full name: Club Deportivo Villaralbo
- Founded: 1952; 74 years ago
- Ground: Ciudad Deportiva, Villaralbo, Castile and León, Spain
- Capacity: 2,500
- President: (Spain) José Fernández
- Head coach: (Spain) Miguel Álvarez Tomé
- League: Tercera Federación – Group 8
- 2025–26: Tercera Federación – Group 8, 10th of 18
Home colours	Away colours

Club Deportivo Villaralbo is a football team based in Villaralbo in the autonomous community of Castile and León. Founded in 1952, it plays in Tercera Federación – Group 8. Its stadium is Ciudad Deportiva Fernández García with a capacity of 2,500 seats.

== History ==
=== Club background ===
- Real Club Deportivo Villaralbo (1952–2007)
- General de Cuadros Eléctricos Villaralbo Club de Fútbol (2007–2016)
- Club Deportivo Villaralbo (2016–present)

== Season to season ==
Season	Tier	Division	Place	Copa del Rey
1974–75	6	2ª Reg.	1st	
1975–76	5	1ª Reg.	11th	
1976–77	DNP			
1977–78	DNP			
1978–79	DNP			
1979–80	6	1ª Reg.	12th	
1980–81	6	1ª Reg.	3rd	
1981–82	6	1ª Reg.	11th	
1982–83	6	1ª Reg.	6th	
1983–1991	DNP			
1991–92	6	1ª Reg.	10th	
1992–93	6	1ª Reg.	10th	
1993–94	6	1ª Reg.	13th	
1994–95	6	1ª Reg.	7th	
1995–96	6	1ª Reg.	8th	
1996–2002	DNP			
2002–03	6	1ª Prov.	1st	
2003–04	5	1ª Reg.	13th	
2004–05	5	1ª Reg.	17th	
2005–06	6	1ª Prov.	1st	

Season	Tier	Division	Place	Copa del Rey
2006–07	5	1ª Reg.	13th	
2007–08	5	1ª Reg.	2nd	
2008–09	5	1ª Reg.	2nd	
2009–10	4	3ª	6th	
2010–11	4	3ª	2nd	
2011–12	4	3ª	4th	
2012–13	4	3ª	18th	
2013–14	5	1ª Reg.	1st	
2014–15	4	3ª	13th	
2015–16	4	3ª	4th	
2016–17	4	3ª	20th	
2017–18	5	1ª Reg.	3rd	
2018–19	5	1ª Reg.	4th	
2019–20	5	1ª Reg.	12th	
2020–21	5	1ª Reg.	3rd	
2021–22	6	1ª Reg.	2nd	
2022–23	6	1ª Reg.	2nd	
2023–24	5	3ª Fed.	15th	
2024–25	5	3ª Fed.	10th	
2025–26	5	3ª Fed.	10th	

Season	Tier	Division	Place	Copa del Rey
2026–27	5	3ª Fed.		

- 7 seasons in Tercera División
- 4 seasons in Tercera Federación

== Former players ==
- (Spain) David Cordón
