= CD La Virgen del Camino =

Association football club in Spain

La Virgen del Camino
- Full name: Club Deportivo La Virgen del Camino
- Founded: 1998
- Ground: Los Dominicos, La Virgen del Camino, Castile and León, Spain
- Capacity: 1,500
- Chairman: (Spain) David Fernández Blanco
- Manager: (Spain) Roberto Carlos
- League: Tercera Federación – Group 8
- 2025–26: Tercera Federación – Group 8, 9th of 18
Home colours

Club Deportivo La Virgen del Camino is a Spanish football team based in La Virgen del Camino, Valverde de la Virgen, Province of León, in the autonomous community of Castile and León. Founded in 1998 it currently plays in Tercera Federación – Group 8, holding home games at Estadio Municipal Los Dominicos, which has a capacity of 1,500 spectators.

== Season to season ==
Season	Tier	Division	Place	Copa del Rey
1998–99	8	3ª Prov.		
1999–2000	8	3ª Prov.		
2000–01	7	2ª Prov.	15th	
2001–02	7	2ª Prov.	13th	
2002–03	7	2ª Prov.	7th	
2003–04	7	2ª Prov.	5th	
2004–05	7	2ª Prov.	7th	
2005–06	7	2ª Prov.	3rd	
2006–07	6	1ª Prov.	4th	
2007–08	6	1ª Prov.	1st	
2008–09	5	1ª Reg.	13th	
2009–10	5	1ª Reg.	9th	
2010–11	5	1ª Reg.	2nd	
2011–12	4	3ª	7th	
2012–13	4	3ª	8th	
2013–14	4	3ª	14th	
2014–15	4	3ª	8th	
2015–16	4	3ª	6th	
2016–17	4	3ª	9th	
2017–18	4	3ª	11th	

Season	Tier	Division	Place	Copa del Rey
2018–19	4	3ª	9th	
2019–20	4	3ª	16th	
2020–21	4	3ª	4th	
2021–22	5	3ª RFEF	11th	
2022–23	5	3ª Fed.	7th	
2023–24	5	3ª Fed.	10th	
2024–25	5	3ª Fed.	6th	
2025–26	5	3ª Fed.	9th	
2026–27	5	3ª Fed.		

- 10 seasons in Tercera División
- 6 seasons in Tercera Federación/Tercera División RFEF
