= Íscar =

Coordinates: 41°21′38″N 4°32′09″W

Íscar, Spain
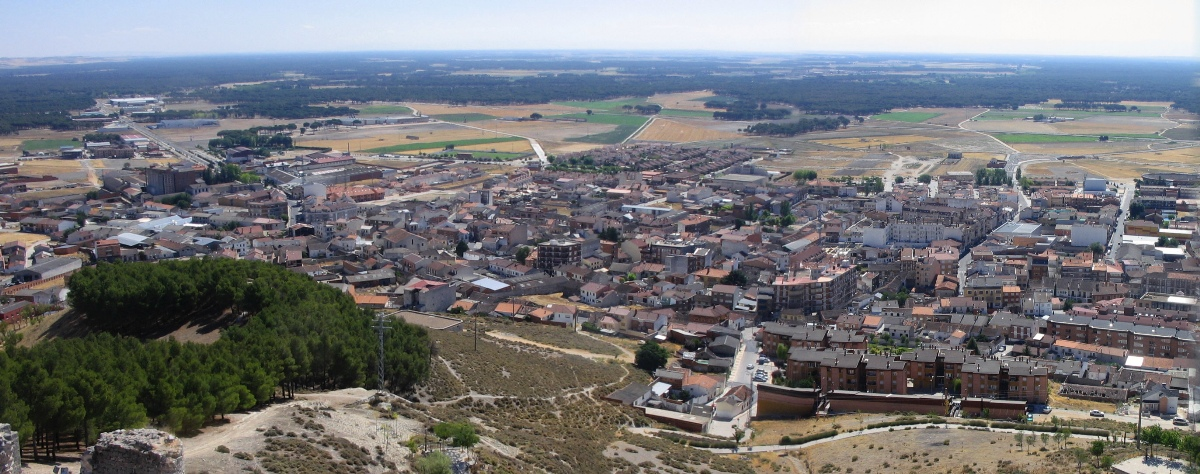
- Panoramic view of Íscar, as seen from their castle

- Coat of arms
- Interactive map of Íscar, Spain
- Country: Spain
- Autonomous community: Castile and León
- Province: Valladolid
- Municipality: Íscar

Area
  - Total: 60.53 km^{2} (23.37 sq mi)
- Elevation: 757 m (2,484 ft)

Population (2025-01-01)
  - Total: 6,493
  - Density: 107.3/km^{2} (277.8/sq mi)
- Time zone: UTC+1 (CET)
  - Summer (DST): UTC+2 (CEST)

Íscar is a municipality located in the province of Valladolid, Castile and León, Spain. According to the 2025 census (INE), the municipality had a population of 6,493 inhabitants.

== Demography ==
According to the 2004 census (INE), the municipality had a population of 6,508 inhabitants.

According to the 2025 census (INE), the municipality had a population of 6,493 inhabitants.

== Gallery ==
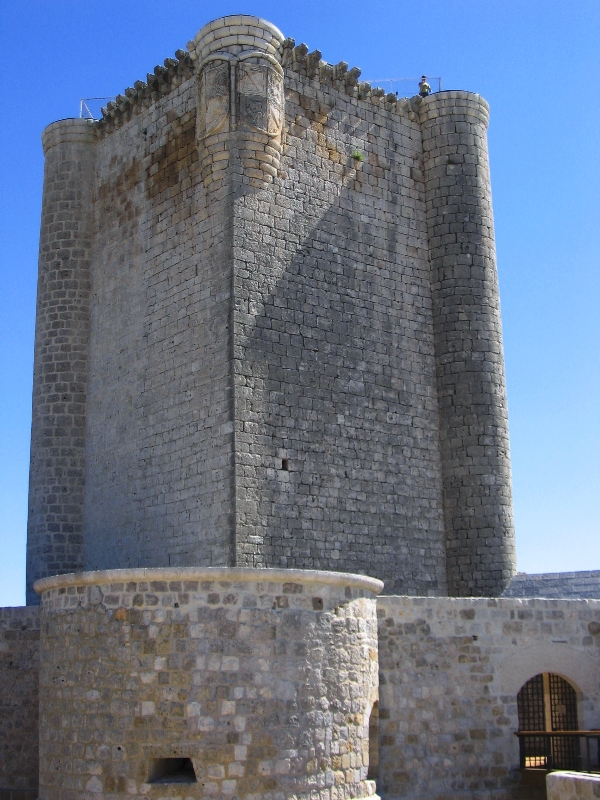
Homage Tower of the Íscar Castle (12th century)

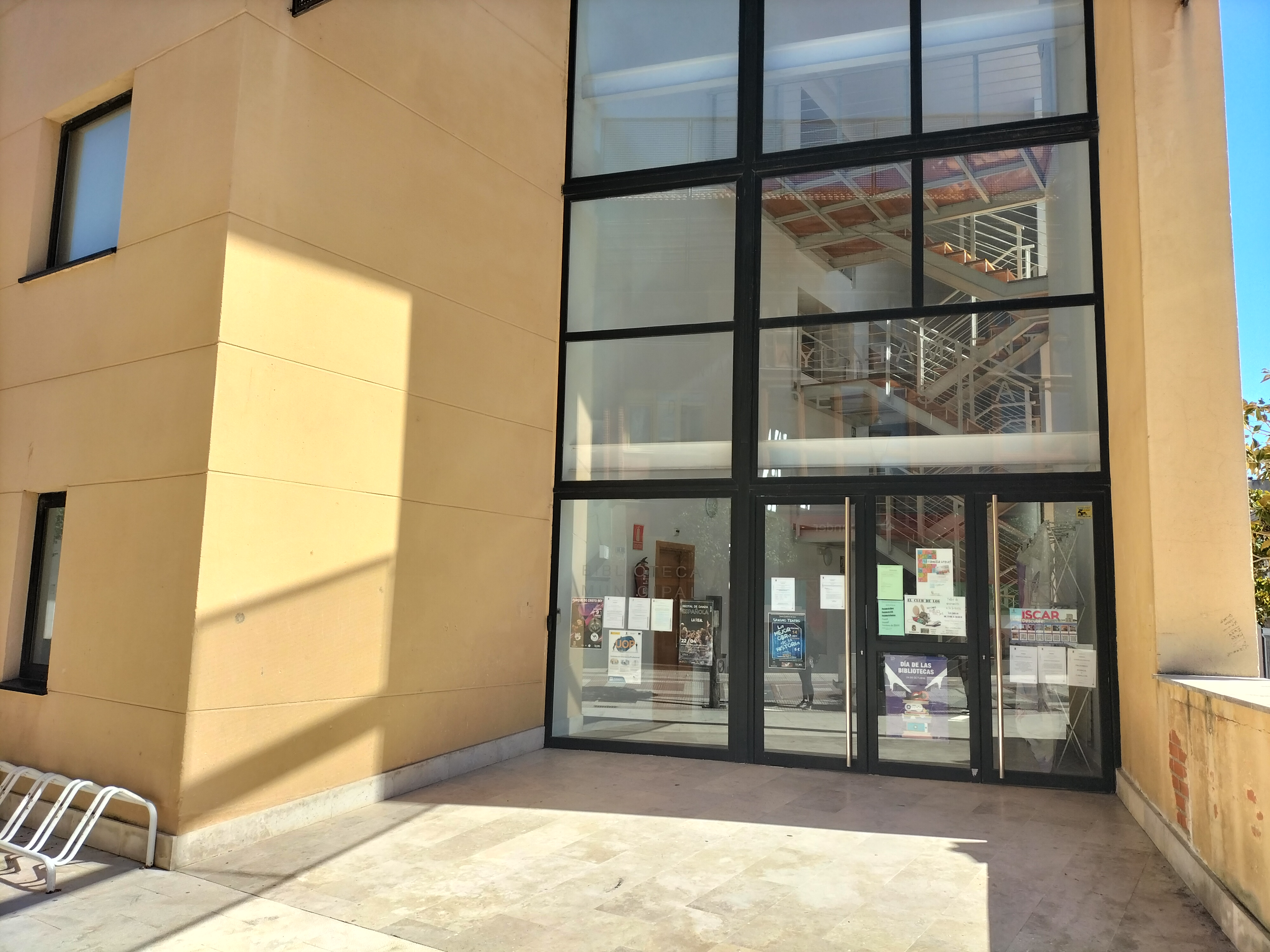
Municipal Public Library of Íscar

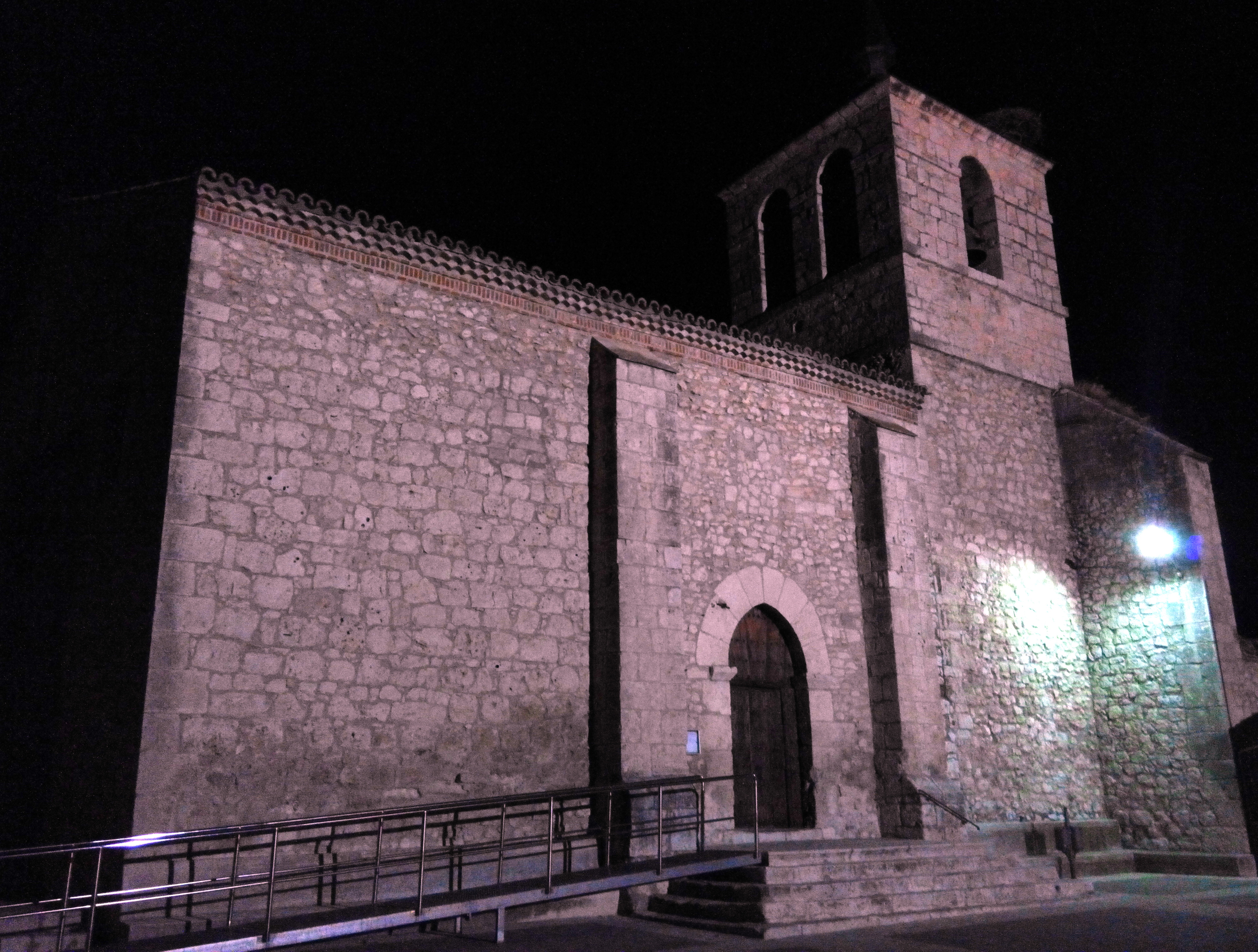
Church of Santa María de Íscar

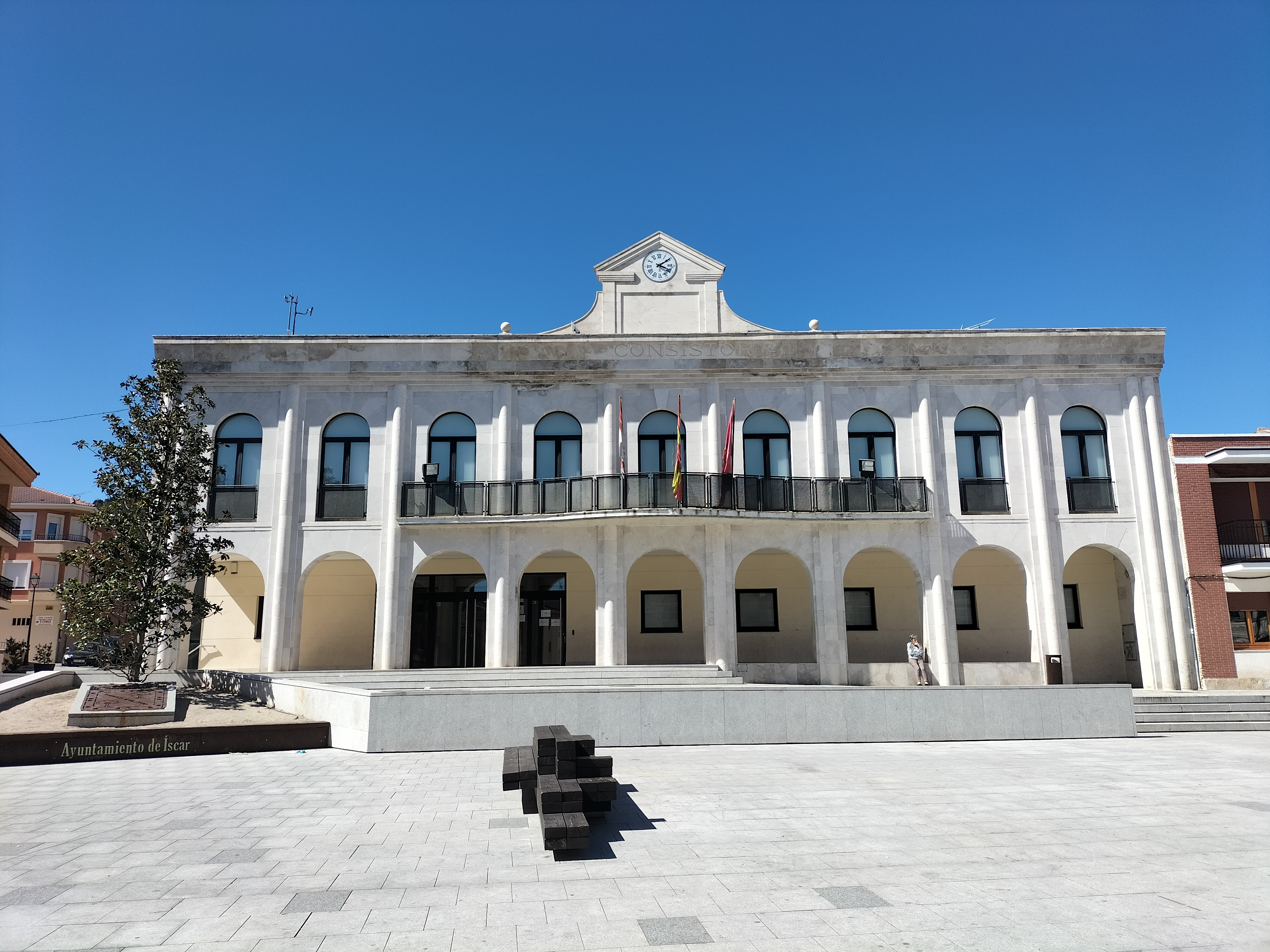
Íscar Town Council

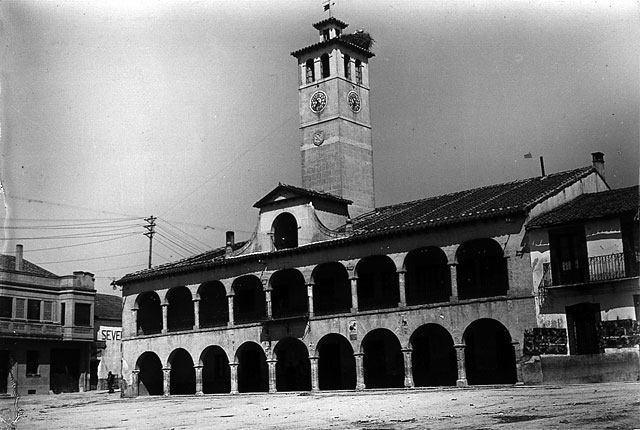
Íscar Town Council in the first half of the 20th century

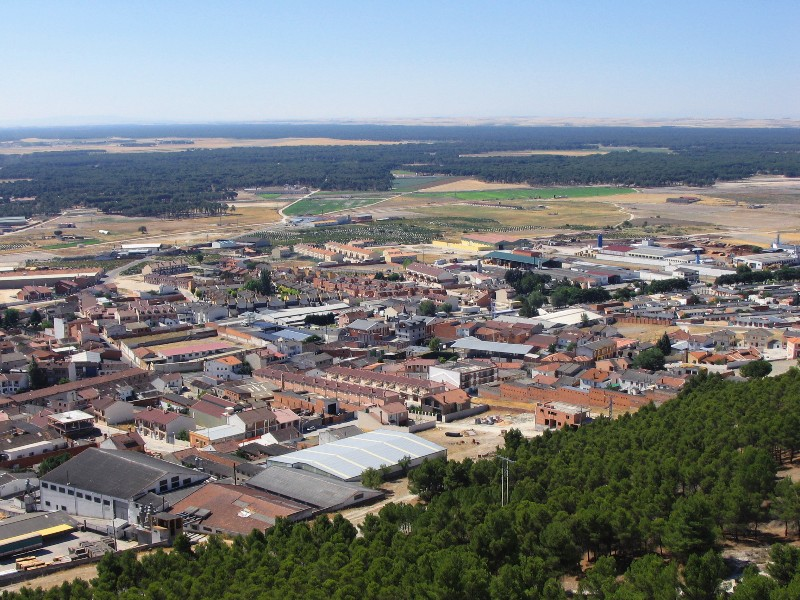
Panoramic view of Iscar, from its castle, looking west

== See also ==
- Cuisine of the province of Valladolid
