= Villaralbo =

Coordinates: 41°29′N 5°41′W

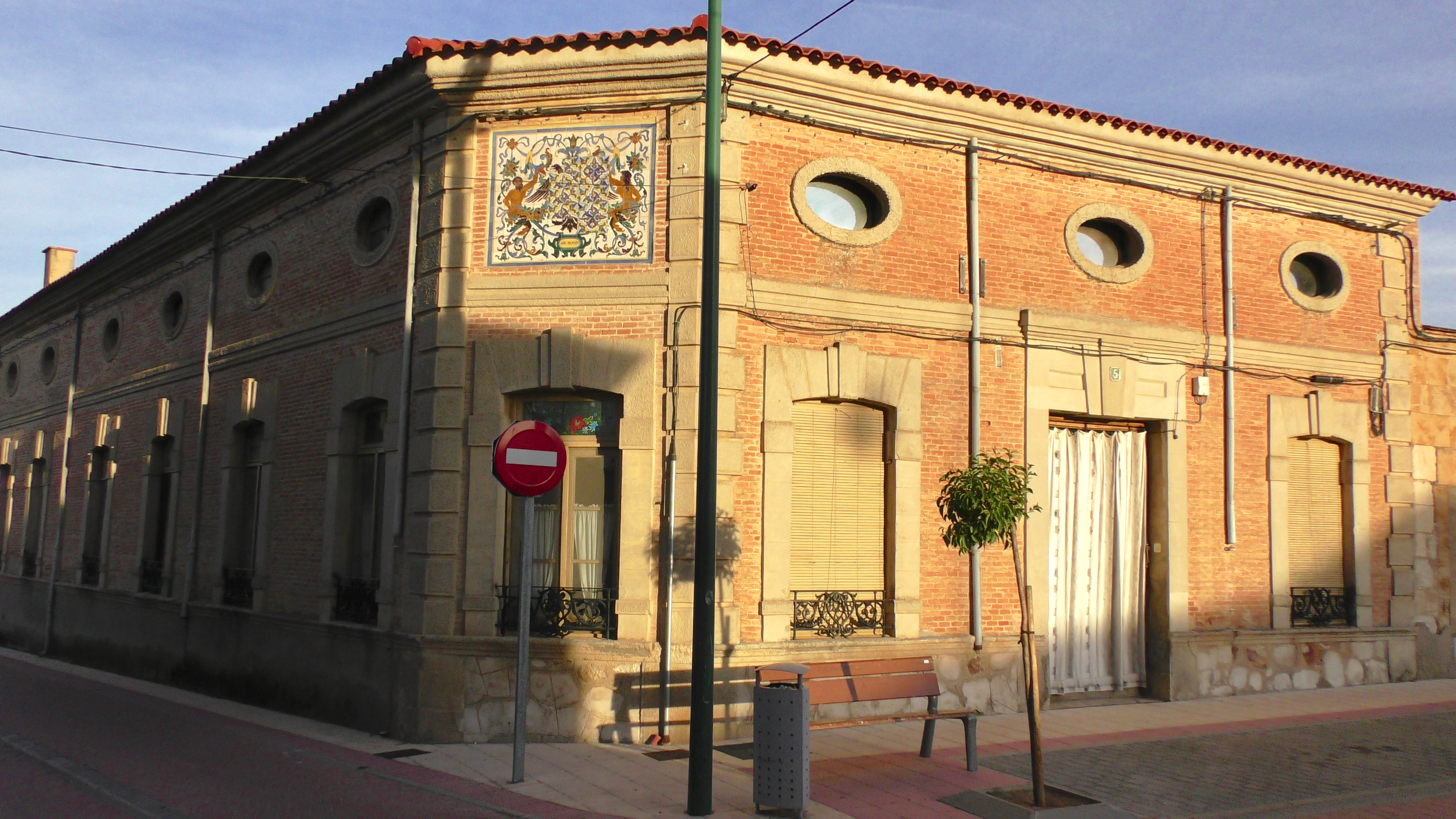

- Flag Coat of arms
- Interactive map of Villaralbo
- Country: Spain
- Autonomous community: Castile and León
- Province: Zamora
- Municipality: Villaralbo

Area
  - Total: 22 km^{2} (8.5 sq mi)

Population (2025-01-01)
  - Total: 1,782
  - Density: 81/km^{2} (210/sq mi)
- Time zone: UTC+1 (CET)
  - Summer (DST): UTC+2 (CEST)
- Website: Official website

Villaralbo is a municipality located in the province of Zamora, Castile and León, Spain. According to the 2004 census (INE), the municipality has a population of 1,669 inhabitants.
