= CA Bembibre =

Association football club in Spain

Atlético Bembibre
- Full name: Club Atlético Bembibre
- Founded: 1922
- Ground: La Devesa, Bembibre, Castile and León, Spain
- Capacity: 2,750
- President: (Spain) David Otero
- Head coach: (Spain) Pablo Huerga
- League: Tercera Federación – Group 8
- 2025–26: Tercera Federación – Group 8, 14th of 18
Home colours	Away colours

Club Atlético Bembibre is a Spanish football team based in Bembibre, León province, in the autonomous community of Castile and León. Founded in 1922, it plays in Tercera Federación – Group 8, holding home games at Estadio La Devesa, with a capacity of 2,750 seats.

== History ==
Atlético Bembibre was founded in 1922. The club debuted in the Tercera División in 1966.

== Season to season ==
Season	Tier	Division	Place	Copa del Rey
1959–60	4	1ª Reg.	5th	
1960–61	4	1ª Reg.	4th	
1961–62	4	1ª Reg.	7th	
1962–63	DNP			
1963–64	4	1ª Reg.	2nd	
1964–65	4	1ª Reg.	5th	
1965–66	4	1ª Reg.	1st	
1966–67	3	3ª	8th	
1967–68	3	3ª	9th	
1968–69	3	3ª	19th	
1969–70	4	1ª Reg.	1st	
1970–71	4	Reg. Pref.	6th	
1971–72	4	Reg. Pref.	12th	
1972–73	4	Reg. Pref.	11th	
1973–74	4	Reg. Pref.	13th	
1974–75	4	Reg. Pref.	13th	
1975–76	4	Reg. Pref.	5th	
1976–77	4	Reg. Pref.	13th	
1977–78	5	Reg. Pref.	3rd	
1978–79	5	Reg. Pref.	4th	

Season	Tier	Division	Place	Copa del Rey
1979–80	5	Reg. Pref.	1st	
1980–81	4	3ª	4th	
1981–82	4	3ª	3rd	First round
1982–83	4	3ª	8th	First round
1983–84	4	3ª	4th	
1984–85	4	3ª	9th	First round
1985–86	4	3ª	10th	
1986–87	4	3ª	13th	
1987–88	4	3ª	3rd	
1988–89	4	3ª	11th	
1989–90	4	3ª	7th	
1990–91	4	3ª	16th	First round
1991–92	4	3ª	1st	
1992–93	4	3ª	3rd	First round
1993–94	4	3ª	4th	Second round
1994–95	4	3ª	3rd	
1995–96	4	3ª	3rd	
1996–97	4	3ª	6th	
1997–98	4	3ª	11th	
1998–99	4	3ª	5th	

Season	Tier	Division	Place	Copa del Rey
1999–2000	4	3ª	3rd	
2000–01	4	3ª	16th	
2001–02	4	3ª	16th	
2002–03	4	3ª	13th	
2003–04	4	3ª	18th	
2004–05	5	1ª Reg.	1st	
2005–06	4	3ª	5th	
2006–07	4	3ª	8th	
2007–08	4	3ª	5th	
2008–09	4	3ª	6th	
2009–10	4	3ª	7th	
2010–11	4	3ª	10th	
2011–12	4	3ª	5th	
2012–13	4	3ª	8th	
2013–14	4	3ª	12th	
2014–15	4	3ª	5th	
2015–16	4	3ª	8th	
2016–17	4	3ª	10th	
2017–18	4	3ª	13th	
2018–19	4	3ª	14th	

Season	Tier	Division	Place	Copa del Rey
2019–20	4	3ª	20th	
2020–21	4	3ª	6th / 6th	
2021–22	5	3ª RFEF	10th	
2022–23	5	3ª Fed.	10th	
2023–24	5	3ª Fed.	12th	
2024–25	5	3ª Fed.	16th	
2025–26	5	3ª Fed.	14th	
2026–27	5	3ª Fed.		

- 43 seasons in Tercera División
- 6 seasons in Tercera Federación/Tercera División RFEF

== Current squad ==
According to the official website. Note: Flags indicate national team as defined under FIFA eligibility rules; some limited exceptions apply. Players may hold more than one non-FIFA nationality.

No.	Pos.	Nation	Player
—	GK	CPV	Ivanildo Rodrigues
—	GK	ALG	Adrián Kerfali
—	GK	ESP	Víctor
—	DF	ESP	David Cubero
—	DF	CPV	Deivis
—	DF	CPV	Adilson
—	DF	ESP	Espi
—	DF	ESP	Pablo
—	DF	ESP	Antonio Uría
—	DF	ESP	Flórez
—	DF	ESP	Tano

No.	Pos.	Nation	Player
—	DF	ESP	Isma
—	MF	ESP	Miguel
—	MF	CPV	Hélder de Brito
—	MF	CPV	Aleixo Cabral
—	MF	ESP	Dani
—	FW	ESP	José Manuel
—	FW	ESP	Javi Amor
—	FW	ESP	Marcos
—	FW	CPV	Samu Lopes
—	FW	ESP	Joshua
—	MF	CMR	Yaya Zoua

== Famous players ==
- (Brazil) Addison Alves
- (Equatorial Guinea) David Mitogo
- (Equatorial Guinea) (Cape Verde) (Spain) Rui
- (Spain) Dani Borreguero
- (Spain) Óscar Contreras
