= SD Ponferradina =

Spanish professional football club

Ponferradina
- Full name: Sociedad Deportiva Ponferradina, S.A.D.
- Nicknames: La Ponfe; La Deportiva; Los Blanquiazules
- Founded: 7 June 1922; 104 years ago
- Stadium: Estadio El Toralín
- Capacity: 8,400
- President: José Silvano
- Head coach: Mehdi Nafti
- League: Primera Federación – Group 1
- 2025–26: Primera Federación – Group 1, 4th of 20
- Website: www.sdponferradina.com
Home colours	Away colours	Third colours

Sociedad Deportiva Ponferradina, S.A.D. is a Spanish football team based in Ponferrada, in the El Bierzo region, in the autonomous community of Castile and León. Founded on 7 June 1922, it plays in Primera Federación - Group 1, holding home matches at the Estadio El Toralín with a seating capacity of 8,400 spectators.

The team's kit consists of blue and white striped shirt, and blue shorts.

== History ==
Sociedad Deportiva Ponferradina was founded in 1922. The first idea of the executive committee to arrange a stadium was to build it inside the castle of Ponferrada, which was eight centuries old. King Alfonso XIII denied the building permit, which led to the construction of Santa Marta; the opening match was played 8 September 1923, a friendly against Cultural y Deportiva Leonesa.

Ponferradina spent the vast majority of its professional years in the fourth and third divisions. In 1967, with the club in the former category, it achieved an historic 6–1 win against La Liga giants Real Madrid. Eight years later, due to financial difficulties, Santa Marta was sold, and the team relocated to Fuentesnuevas.

On 5 September 2000 El Toralín was inaugurated as the club's new grounds: the first game there was a friendly with Celta de Vigo. In 2006–07 Ponfe competed for the first time in the second level after knocking out Universidad Las Palmas and Alicante in the promotion play-offs, but would be immediately relegated back as third from the bottom.

In the 2009–10 season, Ponferradina returned to division two: after winning the regular season with 75 points it defeated Sant Andreu on penalties, in the play-offs (after winning and losing 1–0 over the two legs); subsequently, the club appeared in the league final, losing to Granada 0–1 on aggregate.

In 2010–11 Ponferradina played in the second division for the second time, meeting the same fate after finishing in 21st position. The following campaign the team finished second in its group and, after ousting Real Jaén, Lucena and Tenerife in the play-offs, promoted back.

In 2015-16 season, Ponferradina were relegated after defeated by Girona on the last matchday, finishing in 19th position.

After three seasons in the third-tier Segunda B division, on the 29th of June 2019, Ponferradina won their two-legged playoff against Hércules to secure promotion back to the Segunda División.

In 2022-23 season, Ponferradina were relegated to third division after four seasons in the second division.

=== Rivalries ===
The longest rivalry of SD Ponferradina is the province of León rivalry with Cultural y Deportiva Leonesa. However, the respective first teams of the two clubs haven't played each other since Ponferradina were promoted to the Segunda División and Cultural were relegated to Tercera División in 2010.

== Season to season ==
Season	Tier	Division	Place	Copa del Rey
1939–40	4	1ª Reg.	3rd	
1940–41	4	1ª Reg.	4th	
1941–42	3	1ª Reg.	5th	
1942–43	3	1ª Reg.	3rd	
1943–44	3	3ª	10th	Second round
1944–45	3	3ª	4th	
1945–46	3	3ª	2nd	
1946–47	3	3ª	5th	
1947–48	3	3ª	13th	Second round
1948–49	4	1ª Reg.	1st	
1949–50	3	3ª	16th	
1950–51	3	3ª	7th	
1951–52	3	3ª	10th	
1952–53	3	3ª	3rd	
1953–54	3	3ª	2nd	
1954–55	3	3ª	3rd	
1955–56	3	3ª	6th	
1956–57	3	3ª	7th	
1957–58	3	3ª	1st	
1958–59	3	3ª	5th	

Season	Tier	Division	Place	Copa del Rey
1959–60	3	3ª	3rd	
1960–61	3	3ª	10th	
1961–62	3	3ª	5th	
1962–63	3	3ª	11th	
1963–64	3	3ª	2nd	
1964–65	3	3ª	3rd	
1965–66	3	3ª	1st	
1966–67	3	3ª	2nd	
1967–68	3	3ª	3rd	
1968–69	3	3ª	5th	
1969–70	3	3ª	6th	Fourth round
1970–71	3	3ª	8th	First round
1971–72	3	3ª	14th	First round
1972–73	3	3ª	14th	First round
1973–74	3	3ª	17th	First round
1974–75	4	Reg. Pref.	4th	
1975–76	4	Reg. Pref.	1st	
1976–77	3	3ª	11th	First round
1977–78	4	3ª	4th	First round
1978–79	4	3ª	3rd	

Season	Tier	Division	Place	Copa del Rey
1979–80	4	3ª	4th	First round
1980–81	4	3ª	2nd	Third round
1981–82	4	3ª	5th	First round
1982–83	4	3ª	4th	Second round
1983–84	4	3ª	5th	First round
1984–85	4	3ª	3rd	First round
1985–86	4	3ª	2nd	Second round
1986–87	4	3ª	1st	First round
1987–88	3	2ª B	4th	First round
1988–89	3	2ª B	10th	First round
1989–90	3	2ª B	6th	
1990–91	3	2ª B	15th	Fourth round
1991–92	3	2ª B	14th	Third round
1992–93	3	2ª B	8th	Third round
1993–94	3	2ª B	19th	Third round
1994–95	4	3ª	10th	First round
1995–96	4	3ª	14th	
1996–97	4	3ª	6th	
1997–98	4	3ª	3rd	
1998–99	4	3ª	3rd	

Season	Tier	Division	Place	Copa del Rey
1999–2000	3	2ª B	15th	First round
2000–01	3	2ª B	11th	
2001–02	3	2ª B	14th	
2002–03	3	2ª B	11th	
2003–04	3	2ª B	7th	
2004–05	3	2ª B	1st	First round
2005–06	3	2ª B	4th	Prelim. round
2006–07	2	2ª	20th	Second round
2007–08	3	2ª B	1st	Third round
2008–09	3	2ª B	3rd	Round of 32
2009–10	3	2ª B	1st	Second round
2010–11	2	2ª	21st	Third round
2011–12	3	2ª B	2nd	Round of 32
2012–13	2	2ª	7th	Round of 32
2013–14	2	2ª	16th	Second round
2014–15	2	2ª	7th	Second round
2015–16	2	2ª	19th	Round of 32
2016–17	3	2ª B	5th	First round
2017–18	3	2ª B	12th	Round of 32
2018–19	3	2ª B	2nd	

Season	Tier	Division	Place	Copa del Rey
2019–20	2	2ª	18th	Second round
2020–21	2	2ª	8th	First round
2021–22	2	2ª	8th	Round of 32
2022–23	2	2ª	19th	First round
2023–24	3	1ª Fed.	5th	First round
2024–25	3	1ª Fed.	2nd	Round of 32
2025–26	3	1ª Fed.	4th	Second round
2026–27	3	1ª Fed.		TBD

- 10 seasons in Segunda División
- 4 seasons in Primera Federación
- 21 seasons in Segunda División B
- 46 seasons in Tercera División

== Current squad ==
As of 4 November 2026

Note: Flags indicate national team as defined under FIFA eligibility rules; some limited exceptions apply. Players may hold more than one non-FIFA nationality.

No.	Pos.	Nation	Player
1	GK	ESP	Álex Domínguez
2	DF	ESP	David Andújar
3	DF	ESP	Sergio Nieto
4	DF	MAR	Aymane Jelbat
5	DF	ESP	Eneko Undabarrena
6	MF	ESP	Fede San Emeterio
7	FW	ESP	Carlos Calderón
8	MF	ESP	Arturo Molina
9	FW	BUL	Slavy
10	FW	ESP	Borja Valle
11	FW	GBS	Quicala Bari
12	FW	ESP	Unai Sabroso (on loan from Córdoba)
13	GK	ESP	Alvin Abajas

No.	Pos.	Nation	Player
14	DF	ESP	José Luis Aranda (on loan from Valladolid)
15	MF	ESP	Óscar Vacas
16	MF	ESP	Ntji Tounkara
17	FW	BEN	Josué Chibozo
18	FW	DOM	José de León
19	FW	ESP	Pablo Muñoz
20	DF	BOL	Lucas Macazaga (on loan from Leganés)
21	FW	SEN	Serigne Faye
22	DF	ARG	Emi Hernández
23	DF	ESP	Aleix Roig
24	MF	ESP	Koke Iglesias
25	GK	IRI	Amir Abedzadeh

=== Reserve team ===
Note: Flags indicate national team as defined under FIFA eligibility rules; some limited exceptions apply. Players may hold more than one non-FIFA nationality.

No.	Pos.	Nation	Player
27	MF	ESP	Xavi Iriarte

=== Out on loan ===
Note: Flags indicate national team as defined under FIFA eligibility rules; some limited exceptions apply. Players may hold more than one non-FIFA nationality.

No.	Pos.	Nation	Player
—	DF	UKR	Vladyslav Kysil (at Getafe B until 30 June 2027)
—	FW	BRA	Lian (at Belenenses until 30 June 2027)

=== Current technical staff ===
Position	Staff
Head coach	(Tunisia) Mehdi Nafti
Assistant coach	(Spain) Pablo Lago
Fitness coach	(Spain) Vicente de Dios
Goalkeeping coach	(Spain) Omar Otero
Anaylst	(Spain) Marcos García
Director of Medical Services	(Spain) Ricardo Vélez Silva
Physiotherapist	(Spain) Carlos Álvarez (Spain) Pablo Núñez (Spain) Ernesto López
Rehab fitness coach	(Spain) Christian Sanz
Delegate	(Spain) José Antonio Blanco (Spain) José Vicente Quintana
Kit man	(Spain) Manuel Torrecilla

Last updated: 2 June 2026
Source: SD Ponferradina (in Spanish)

== Honours and achievements ==
- Segunda División B: 2004–05, 2007–08, 2009–10
- Tercera División: 1957–58, 1965–66, 1986–87
- Regional Championships: 1934–35
- Castilla y León Cup: 2010–11
- Teresa Herrera Trophy: 2021

== Famous players ==
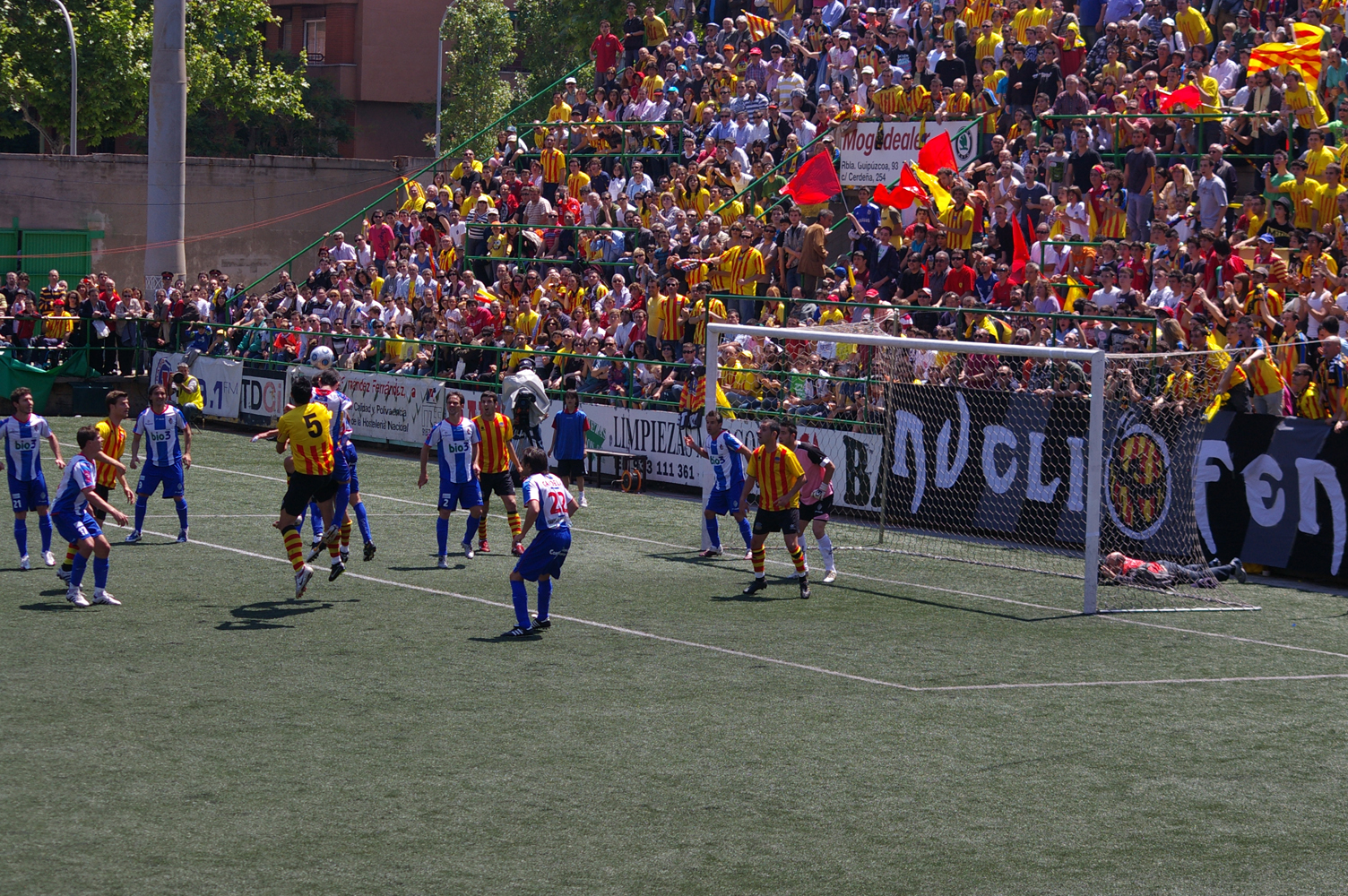
2010 Segunda División B play-offs game against Sant Andreu, in Barcelona.

Note: this list includes players that have appeared in at least 100 league games and/or have reached international status.

- (Albania) Vullnet Basha
- (Iran) Amir Abedzadeh
- (Brazil) Yuri
- (Canada) Iain Hume
- (Canada) Tam Nsaliwa
- (Chile) Lucas Domínguez
- (Chile) Francisco Prieto
- (Equatorial Guinea) David Mitogo
- (Liberia) William Jebor
- (Martinique) Samuel Camille
- (Montenegro) Luka Đorđević
- (Morocco) Nabil Baha
- (Niger) Yac Diori
- (Spain) Alan Baró
- (Spain) Acorán Barrera
- (Spain) Pepe Alcaide
- (Spain) Andy Rodríguez
- (Spain) Berto
- (Spain) Dani Borreguero
- (Spain) Óscar de Paula
- (Spain) Juan Manuel Fuentes
- (Spain) Kepa Arrizabalaga
- (Spain) Máyor
- (Spain) Delio Morollón
- (Spain) Nacho Fernández
- (Spain) Manuel Peña
- (Spain) Jonathan Ruiz
- (Spain) Rubén Vega
- (Ukraine) Dmytro Khomchenovskyi

== Former coaches ==
Dates	Name
1922–24	Unknown
1924–25	(Spain) Carlos Martínez
1925–44	Unknown
1944–45	(Spain) Marcial de Miguel
1945–46	(Spain) Del Pino
1946–48	(Spain) Aurelio Omist
1948	(Spain) Juan Rocasolano
1948–50	(Spain) Aurelio Omist
1950–51	(Hungary) Károly Plattkó
1951–52	(Spain) Emilio Morán
1952–54	(Spain) Aurelio Omist
1954–56	(Spain) Hernández
1956–58	(Spain) Aurelio Omist
1958–59	(Spain) Armando
1959–60	(Spain) Fuentes
1960–61	(Spain) Armando
1961–63	(Spain) Paquito
1963–64	(Spain) Óscar Álvarez
1964–66	(Spain) Cerezo
1966–67	(Spain) Martín Susilla
1967–68	(Spain) Aurelio Omist

Dates	Name
1968	(Spain) Francisco Hinojosa
1968–69	(Spain) Leardi
1969	(Spain) Tito
1969–70	(Spain) Cerezo
1970–71	(Spain) Pestaña
1971–72	(Spain) Antonio Pintos
1972–73	(Spain) Cerezo
1973	(Spain) Enrique Rodríguez
1973–74	(Spain) Jiménez Piñero
1974–75	(Spain) Enrique Rodríguez
1975	(Spain) Martín
1975–76	(Spain) Enrique Rodríguez
1976–77	(Spain) García Arroyo
1977–80	(Spain) Caeiro
1980–82	(Spain) Nino Cubelos
1982–85	(Spain) Enrique Rodríguez
1985–86	(Spain) Jesús Tartilán
1986–87	(Spain) Arlindo Cuesta
1987–89	(Spain) José Antonio Saro
1989–90	(Spain) Jesús Tartilán
1990	(Spain) Guillermo

Dates	Name
1991	(Spain) Jesús Tartilán
1991	(Spain) Julio Raúl González
1991–92	(Spain) Enrique Rodríguez
1992	(Spain) Nando Yosu
1992–93	(Spain) Roberto Álvarez
1993–94	(Spain) Enrique Rodríguez
1994	(Spain) Jesús Tartilán
1994	(Spain) Roberto Álvarez
1994–95	(Spain) Eulate
1995–96	(Spain) Aníbal Rodríguez
1996	(Spain) Arlindo Cuesta
1996	(Spain) Eulate
1996	(Spain) Jesús María Gómez
1996	(Spain) Nino Cubelos
1996–97	(Spain) Antonio Galarraga
1997	(Spain) José Ignacio López
1997–98	(Spain) José Carrete
1998–99	(Spain) Jesús Tartilán
1999	(Spain) José Carrete
1999–01	(Spain) Jesús Tartilán
2001	(Spain) José Antonio Saro

Dates	Name
2001–03	(Spain) Simón Pérez
2003–05	(Spain) Miguel Ángel Álvarez Tomé
2005–07	(Spain) Pichi Lucas
2007	(Spain) Jesús Tartilán
2007	(Spain) Nistal
2007–08	(Spain) David Amaral
2008–09	(Spain) Ángel Viadero
2009	(Spain) Jesús Tartilán
2009–11	(Spain) José Carlos Granero
2011	(Spain) Nistal
2011–14	(Spain) Claudio Barragán
2014–16	(Spain) José Manuel Díaz
2016	(Spain) Fabri
2016	(Spain) Rubén Vega
2016	(Spain) Manolo Herrero
2016–2017	(Spain) Pedro Munitis
2017	(Spain) Miguel Ángel Álvarez Tomé
2017-2018	(Spain) Carlos Terrazas
2018-	(Spain) Bolo

== Presidents ==
Dates	Name
1922–23	(Spain) Rogelio López
1923–26	(Spain) Fernando Miranda
1926–27	(Spain) José María Álvarez
1927–28	(Spain) Pedro Barrios
1928–31	(Spain) Fernando Miranda
1931–35	(Spain) José Domingo
1935–36	(Spain) Segundo Trincado

Dates	Name
1936–46	(Spain) Fernando Miranda
1946–47	(Spain) Gustavo Bodelón
1947–49	(Spain) Mariano Arias
1949–61	(Spain) Antonio Fernández
1961–64	(Spain) Feliciano González
1964	(Spain) Emilio Tahoces
1965–66	(Spain) Manuel García Granero

Dates	Name
1966–72	(Spain) Feliciano González
1972–73	(Spain) Antonio Laredo
1973–78	(Spain) José Maria Agudo
1978–82	(Spain) Feliciano González
1982–86	(Spain) Porfirio Fernández
1986–94	(Spain) Delfrido Pérez
1994–96	(Spain) Martín Pérez

Dates	Name
1996–97	(Spain) Lisardo González
1997–99	(Spain) Delfrido Pérez
1999–present	(Spain) José Fernández Nieto
