= 2012–13 Real Valladolid season =

Real Valladolid
2012–13 season
- President: Carlos Suárez Sureda
- Head coach: Miroslav Đukić
- Stadium: José Zorrilla
- La Liga: 14th
- Copa del Rey: Round of 32
- Top goalscorer: League: Óscar (9); All: Óscar (9)
Home colours	Away colours

The 2012–13 Real Valladolid season was the club's first season in La Liga since its relegation at the end of the 2009–10 season. The club's manager in the previous season, Miroslav Đukić, continued with the team.

== Trophies balance ==
Category	Trophy	Started round	First match	Result	Last match
Friendly Trophy	15th Ramón Losada Trophy	Final	1 August 2012	Winners	1 August 2012
Friendly Trophy	Copa Castilla y León 2012	Quarterfinals	8 August 2012	Runners-up	5 September 2012
Friendly Trophy	39th Ciudad de Valladolid Trophy	Final	7 September 2012	Runners-up	7 September 2012
Friendly Trophy	1st Canal de Castilla Trophy	Final	12 October 2012	Runners-up	12 October 2012
Competitive	La Liga	—	20 August 2012	10th	1 June 2013
Competitive	Copa del Rey	Round of 32	1 November 2012	Round of 32	27 November 2012

=== Competitive balance ===
Biggest win
	Home				Away			
La Liga	30 September 2012	Matchday 6	v. Rayo Vallecano	6 – 1	20 August 2012	Matchday 1	v. Zaragoza	0 – 1
La Liga	30 September 2012	Matchday 6	v. Rayo Vallecano	6 – 1	4 November 2012	Matchday 10	v. Osasuna	0 – 1
La Liga	30 September 2012	Matchday 6	v. Rayo Vallecano	6 – 1	4 December 2012	Matchday 14	v. Sevilla	1 – 2
Copa del Rey	1 November 2012	Round of 32, 1st leg	v. Real Betis	1 – 0	None registered			
Biggest loss
	Home				Away			
La Liga	22 December 2012	Matchday 17	v. Barcelona	1 – 3	2 September 2012	Matchday 3	v. Athletic Bilbao	2 – 0
La Liga	22 December 2012	Matchday 17	v. Barcelona	1 – 3	6 January 2013	Matchday 18	v. Celta Vigo	3 – 1
Copa del Rey	None registered				27 November 2012	Round of 32, 2nd leg	v. Betis	3 – 0

== Summer transfers ==
=== In ===
(substituted on) In (3 players)
Player	From	Fee
(Spain) Lluís Sastre	(Spain) Huesca	Free
(Serbia) Antonio Rukavina	(Germany) 1860 Munich	Free
(Germany) Patrick Ebert	(Germany) Hertha BSC	Free

=== Out ===
(substituted off) Out (12 players)
Player	New Team	Fee
(Spain) Sisi	(Spain) Osasuna	Free
(Spain) Nauzet	(Spain) Las Palmas	Free
(Portugal) Saná	(Portugal) Académica de Coimbra	Free
(Tunisia) Mehdi Nafti	(Spain) Real Murcia	Free
(Spain) Jofre Mateu	(Spain) Girona	Free
(Spain) Dani Aquino	(Spain) Oviedo	Free
(Spain) Jorge Alonso	(Spain) Racing Santander	Free
(Spain) Marquitos	(Spain) Xerez	Free
(Spain) Juanito	Retired	
(Spain) Sergio Matabuena	Free agent	
(Spain) Fernando Varela	Free agent	
(Ghana) Ismail Abdul Razak	Free agent	

=== Loan in ===
(substituted on) Loan in (3 players)
Player	From
(Argentina) Juan Neira	(Argentina) Lanús
(Spain) Omar Ramos	(Spain) Huesca
(Portugal) Henrique Sereno	(Portugal) Porto

=== Loan out ===
(substituted off) Loan out (1 player)
Player	Team
(Spain) Carlos Lázaro	(Spain) Huesca

=== Loan return ===
(substituted on) Loan return (0 players)
Italics for players returning to the club but left it during pre-season
Player	From
(Spain) Quique	(Spain) Logroñés
(Spain) Carlos Lázaro	(Spain) Huesca

=== Promotion from youth system ===
(substituted on) Promotion from youth system (1 player)
Italics for players who were promoted from youth system but left the team during pre-season
Player	Date of birth (Age)
(Spain) Lolo Coronado	7 April 1993 (aged 19)

== Winter transfers ==
=== In ===
(substituted on) In (2 players)
Player	From	Fee
(Sweden) Daniel Larsson	(Sweden) Malmö FF	Free
(Germany) Valdet Rama	(Sweden) Örebro SK	Free

=== Promotion from youth system ===
(substituted on) Promotion from youth system (1 player)
Italics for players who were promoted from youth system but left the team during winter transfer window
Player	Date of birth (Age)
(Spain) Rubén Peña	18 July 1991 (aged 21)

== Players ==
=== Squad ===
- Updated to 23 January 2013

Note: Flags indicate national team as defined under FIFA eligibility rules; some limited exceptions apply. Players may hold more than one non-FIFA nationality.

No.	Pos.	Nation	Player
1	GK	ESP	Jaime Jiménez
2	DF	SRB	Antonio Rukavina
4	DF	ESP	Marc Valiente
5	DF	POR	Henrique Sereno (On loan from Porto)
6	DF	ESP	Jesús Rueda
7	MF	ARG	Juan Neira (On loan from Lanús)
8	MF	ESP	Javier Baraja
9	FW	ESP	Javi Guerra
10	MF	ESP	Óscar
11	FW	SWE	Daniel Larsson
13	GK	VEN	Dani Hernández
14	MF	ESP	Omar Ramos (On loan from Huesca)

No.	Pos.	Nation	Player
15	FW	ESP	Alberto Bueno
16	MF	ESP	Lluís Sastre
17	DF	ESP	Carlos Peña
18	MF	ESP	Álvaro Rubio
20	MF	GER	Patrick Ebert
22	MF	ESP	Víctor Pérez
23	MF	ALB	Valdet Rama
24	DF	ESP	Mikel Balenziaga
25	FW	ANG	Manucho
27	MF	ESP	Lolo Coronado
28	MF	ESP	Rubén Peña

=== Youth system ===
Note: Flags indicate national team as defined under FIFA eligibility rules; some limited exceptions apply. Players may hold more than one non-FIFA nationality.

No.	Pos.	Nation	Player
—	MF	ESP	Quique
—	DF	ESP	Fran No
—	MF	ESP	Jorge Pesca
—	FW	ITA	Andrea Mancini
—	FW	ESP	Ruba

No.	Pos.	Nation	Player
—	MF	ESP	Alberto Rodríguez
—	MF	ESP	Alberto Gil
—	FW	ESP	Zubi
—	FW	ESP	Rubén Díaz
—	DF	ESP	Diego Bardanca

=== Long-term injuries ===
==== Víctor Pérez's broken fibula ====
Out between: January 2013 – May 2013

In the morning training of 5 January 2013, Víctor Pérez broke the fibula in his right leg fortuitously, and at the evening he underwent surgery in the Hospital Sagrado Corazón by Dr. Rafael Ramos, chief of Real Valladolid's medical service. The estimated time for recovery of his injury is about four months approximately, so he would miss the remainder of the season.

=== Called up by their national football team ===
List of players called up by their national team
Updated to 23 January 2013
2	Antonio Rukavina	Serbia	v. Chile (14 November 2012) v. Cyprus (6 February 2013)
5	Henrique Sereno	Portugal	v. Russia (12 October 2012) v. Northern Ireland (16 October 2012)
13	Dani Hernández	Venezuela	v. Japan (15 August 2012) v. Peru (7 September 2012) v. Paraguay (11 September 2012) v. Ecuador (16 October 2012) v. Nigeria (14 November 2012)
25	Manucho	Angola	v. Mozambique (15 August 2012) v. Zimbabwe (9 September 2012) v. Zimbabwe (14 October 2012) v. Congo (14 November 2012) v. Zambia (5 January 2013) v. Morocco (19 January 2013) v. South Africa (23 January 2013) v. Cape Verde (27 January 2013)

== Match statistics ==
Updated to 29 January 2013

No.	Pos.	Player	Goal		Booked		(yellow card) (yellow-red card)		Sent off (straight red)	
No.	Pos.	Player	Liga	Cup	Liga	Cup	Liga	Cup	Liga	Cup
1	GK	(Spain) Jaime Jiménez			1					
2	DF	(Serbia) Antonio Rukavina	1		3					
4	DF	(Spain) Marc Valiente			2					
5	DF	(Portugal) Henrique Sereno			4					1
6	DF	(Spain) Jesús Rueda			1					
7	MF	(Argentina) Juan Neira			1	1				
8	MF	(Spain) Javier Baraja	1			1				
9	FW	(Spain) Javi Guerra	2		1					
10	MF	(Spain) Óscar	9		5					
13	GK	(Venezuela) Dani Hernández			1					
14	MF	(Spain) Omar Ramos			4					
15	FW	(Spain) Alberto Bueno	3	1	3					
16	MF	(Spain) Lluís Sastre			5	1				
17	DF	(Spain) Carlos Peña			1					
18	MF	(Spain) Álvaro Rubio			5					
20	MF	(Germany) Patrick Ebert	5		3					
22	MF	(Spain) Víctor Pérez (LTI)	3		2					
24	DF	(Spain) Mikel Balenziaga			2	1				
25	FW	(Angola) Manucho	6		4		1			
27	MF	(Spain) Lolo Coronado			1	1				
28	MF	(Spain) Rubén Peña				1				

== Competitions ==
=== Pre-season and friendly tournaments ===
==== Friendly matches ====
6 August 2012	Beira-Mar (Portugal)	0 – 0	(Spain) Valladolid	(Portugal) Aveiro
20:55 CEST; 19:55 Local time		(Report)		Stadium: Municipal de Aveiro; Attendance: 1,000; Referee: (Portugal) Fernando Martins

9 August 2012	Paços de Ferreira (Portugal)	4 – 0	(Spain) Valladolid	(Portugal) Paços de Ferreira
21:00 CEST; 20:00 Local time	Vítor 19'; Caetano 47', 53'; Anunciação 84'	(Report)		Stadium: Mata Real; Attendance: 500; Referee: (Portugal) Filipe Jesús

12 August 2012	Rio Ave (Portugal)	2 – 1	(Spain) Valladolid	(Portugal) Vila do Conde
19:00 CEST; 18:00 Local time	Braga 35'; Wíres (yellow card) 79'; Valiente 85' (o.g.)	(Report)	(yellow card) 33' Pérez; 60' Guerra	Stadium: Estádio do Rio Ave FC; Attendance: 500; Referee: (Portugal) Santo Gomes

2 January 2013	Cultural Leonesa (Spain)	0 – 4	(Spain) Valladolid	(Spain) León
19:00 CET	López (yellow card) 78'	(Report)	5' Guerra; 23' (o.g.) Negral; (yellow card) 43' Hernández; 53' Óscar; 63', (yellow card) 85' Neira	Stadium: Reino de León; Attendance: 1,500; Referee: (Spain) (Castile and León) Humanes Balmont

==== 15th Ramón Losada Trophy ====
1 August 2012 Final	Sporting de Gijón (Spain)	1 – 1 (1 – 4 p)	(Spain) Valladolid	(Spain) Luarca (Asturias)
19:30 CEST	Carmelo 47'	(Report)	31' Guerra; (yellow card) 90' Pesca	Stadium: La Veigona; Attendance: 700; Referee: (Spain) (Asturias) Fernández Pérez
	Penalties
	Bilić (penalty scored); Cases (penalty missed); Morán (penalty missed)		(penalty scored) Peña; (penalty scored) Bueno; (penalty scored) Neira; (penalty scored) Baraja

==== Copa Castilla y León 2012 ====
8 August 2012 Quarterfinals	Salamanca (Spain)	1 – 1 (4 – 5 p)	(Spain) Valladolid	(Spain) Villares de la Reina (Salamanca)
20:30 CEST	Hernández 10'	(Report)	86' Ruba	Stadium: El Helmántico; Attendance: 1,885; Referee: (Spain) (Castile and León) Muriel Isidro
	Penalties
	Sánchez (penalty scored); Piojo (penalty scored); De Lucas (penalty scored); Hernández (penalty scored); Manasé (penalty missed)		(penalty scored) Rodríguez; (penalty scored) Gil; (penalty scored) Zubi; (penalty scored) Tekio; (penalty scored) Ruba

22 August 2012 Semifinals	Atlético Bembibre (Spain)	1 – 2	(Spain) Valladolid	(Spain) Bembibre (León)
20:45 CEST	Puente 25'	(Report)	3' Bueno; 88' Díaz	Stadium: La Devesa; Referee: (Spain) (Castile and León) Gómez González

5 September 2012 Final	Mirandés (Spain)	4 – 1	(Spain) Valladolid	(Spain) Miranda de Ebro (Burgos)
20:30 CEST	Cases 21'; Alain 42'; Infante 79'; Colsa (yellow card) 82'; Muneta 86'	(Report); Live TV: CyLTV	77' Díaz; (yellow card) 90' Bardanca	Stadium: Anduva; Attendance: 3,500; Referee: (Spain) (Castile and León) González González

==== 39th Ciudad de Valladolid Trophy ====
7 September 2012 Final	Valladolid (Spain)	2 – 2 (1 – 3 p)	(Spain) Athletic Bilbao	(Spain) Valladolid
20:00 CEST	Ebert 7'; Neira 86'	(Report)	36' Ibai; (yellow card) 65', (goal) 87' Toquero	Stadium: Nuevo José Zorrilla; Attendance: 6,638; Referee: (Spain) (Castile and León) González González
	Penalties
	Peña (penalty missed); Sastre (penalty scored); Baraja (penalty missed); Neira (penalty missed)		(penalty scored) San José; (penalty missed) Aduriz; (penalty missed) Ibai; (penalty scored) Iturraspe; (penalty scored) Aurtenetxe

==== 1st Canal de Castilla Trophy ====
12 October 2012 Final	Valladolid (Spain)	0 – 1	(Spain) Getafe	(Spain) Medina de Rioseco (Valladolid)
17:00 CEST	Baraja (yellow card)	(Report)	22' Fraile; (red card) 82' Lafita; (yellow card) Rodríguez	Stadium: Municipal Ground; Attendance: 1,500; Referee: (Spain) (Castile and León) Gaspar Barajas

=== La Liga ===
Matchday	1	2	3	4	5	6	7	8	9	10	11	12	13	14	15	16	17	18	19	20	21	22	23	24	25	26	27	28	29	30	31	32	33	34	35	36	37	38
Against	ZAR	LEV	ATH	BET	ATM	RYV	ESP	MGA	RSO	OSA	VAL	GET	GRA	SFC	RM	DEP	FCB	CEL	MLL	ZAR	LEV	ATH	BET	ATM	RYV	ESP	MGA	RSO	OSA	VAL	GET	GRA	SFC	RM	DEP	FCB	CEL	MLL
Venue	A	H	A	H	A	H	H	A	H	A	H	A	H	A	H	A	H	A	H	H	A	H	A	H	A	A	H	A	H	A	H	A	H	A	H	A	H	A
Position	8	2	6	9	13	7	8	10	10	8	8	12	9	7	8	8	11	11	10	10	10	10	10	11	11													
Goal Average (useful in case of tie)																				Won	Won																	

Win Draw Lost

		All							Home							Away						
		Pts	W	D	L	F	A	Dif.	Pts	W	D	L	F	A	Dif.	Pts	W	D	L	F	A	Dif.
10	Valladolid	35	9	8	10	35	34	+1	20	5	5	4	24	19	+5	15	4	3	6	11	15	–4

La Liga Winner (also qualified for 2013–14 UEFA Champions League Group Stage)
2013–14 UEFA Champions League Group Stage
2013–14 UEFA Champions League 4th Qualifying Round
2013–14 UEFA Europa League Group Stage
2013–14 UEFA Europa League 4th Qualifying Round
2013–14 UEFA Europa League 3rd Qualifying Round
Relegation to Liga Adelante

==== Matches ====
20 August 2012 1	Zaragoza	0–1	Valladolid	Zaragoza
23:00 CEST	Apoño (yellow card) 67'; José Mari (yellow card) 81'	(Report); Live TV:	(yellow card) 10' Jaime; 44', (yellow card) 72' Óscar; (yellow card) 63' Rubio; (yellow card) 84' Sastre; (yellow card) 90' Lolo	Stadium: La Romareda; Attendance: 34,500; Referee: (Canary Islands) Alejandro Hernández Hernández

27 August 2012 2	Valladolid	2–0	Levante	Valladolid
20:00 CEST	Pérez 38' (pen.), 48' (pen.); Rubio (yellow card) 57'	(Report); Live TV: GolT /	(yellow card) 20' López; (yellow card) 32' (yellow-red card) 37' Navarro; (yellow card) 47' Diop; (yellow card) 47' Iborra; (yellow card) 84' Barkero; (yellow card) 88' Ballesteros	Stadium: Nuevo José Zorrilla; Attendance: 13,375; Referee: (Galicia (Spain)) Ignacio Iglesias Villanueva

2 September 2012 3	Athletic Bilbao	2–0	Valladolid	Bilbao
16:00 CEST	Aduriz 68'; Susaeta 74'	(Report); Live TV: GolT /	(yellow card) 54' Rubio	Stadium: San Mamés; Attendance: 34,000; Referee: (Community of Madrid) Carlos del Cerro Grande

17 September 2012 4	Valladolid	0–1	Betis	Valladolid
21:30 CEST	Sastre (yellow card) 63'	(Report); Live TV:	(yellow card) 43' Paulão; (yellow card) 74' Pereira; 88' Castro	Stadium: Nuevo José Zorrilla; Attendance: 13,640; Referee: (Basque Country (autonomous community)) Carlos Delgado Ferreiro

23 September 2012 5	Atlético Madrid	2–1	Valladolid	Madrid
18:00 CEST	Miranda (yellow card) 22'; Godín 22'; Gabi (yellow card) 41'; Falcao 45+1' (pen.)	(Report); Live TV: GolT /	(yellow card) 10' Óscar; (yellow card) 27' Pérez; (yellow card) 33' Omar; (yellow card) 38' Rukavina; (yellow card) 45', (goal) 54' Bueno; (yellow card) 69' Manucho	Stadium: Vicente Calderón; Attendance: 45,000; Referee: (Asturias) César Muñiz Fernández

30 September 2012 6	Valladolid	6–1	Rayo Vallecano	Valladolid
16:00 CEST	Bueno 9'; Manucho 12', 85'; Óscar 20', 55'; Rubio (yellow card) 26'; Rukavina 36'	(Report); Live TV: GolT /	5' Domínguez; (yellow card) 22' Adrián; (yellow card) 51' José Carlos; (yellow card) 82' Labaka	Stadium: Nuevo José Zorrilla; Attendance: 14,978; Referee: (Extremadura) Jesús Gil Manzano

6 October 2012 7	Valladolid	1–1	Espanyol	Valladolid
20:00 CEST	Rukavina (yellow card) 69'; Sereno (yellow card) 74'; Óscar 81'	(Report); Live TV: GolT /	(yellow card) 40' (yellow-red card) 44' V. Álvarez; (yellow card) 44' C. Álvarez; (yellow card) 56' Sánchez; 69' (pen.), (yellow card) 90+2' Verdú; (yellow card) 71' Forlín; (yellow card) 90+2' Fonte	Stadium: Nuevo José Zorrilla; Attendance: 14,499; Referee: (Andalusia) David Fernández Borbalán

20 October 2012 8	Málaga	2–1	Valladolid	Málaga
16:00 CEST	Demichelis (yellow card) 19'; Isco 36'; Joaquín 86'	(Report); Live TV: GolT /	8', (yellow card) 51' (yellow-red card) 80' Manucho; (yellow card) 33' Omar; (yellow card) 70' Valiente; (yellow card) 84' Sereno; (yellow card) 88' Ebert	Stadium: La Rosaleda; Attendance: 26,990; Referee: (Galicia (Spain)) Ignacio Iglesias Villanueva

29 October 2012 9	Valladolid	2–2	Real Sociedad	Valladolid
21:30 CET	Rueda (yellow card) 15'; Ebert (yellow card) 39', (goal) 42'; Rubio (yellow card) 63'; Óscar 74'	(Report); Live TV: GolT /	36', 56' Griezmann; (yellow card) 72' González; (yellow card) 76' C. Martínez; (yellow card) 90+3' Pardo	Stadium: Nuevo José Zorrilla; Attendance: 12,574; Referee: (Catalonia) Alfonso Álvarez Izquierdo

4 November 2012 10	Osasuna	0–1	Valladolid	Pamplona
17:50 CET	Rubén (yellow card) 16' (yellow-red card) 75'; Armenteros (yellow card) 44'	(Report); Live TV: GolT /	(yellow card) 20' Pérez; (yellow card) 40' Manucho; (yellow card) 54' Neira; 82' Ebert	Stadium: El Sadar; Attendance: 14,068; Referee: (Andalusia) Pedro Pérez Montero

11 November 2012 11	Valladolid	1–1	Valencia	Valladolid
12:00 CET	Pérez 64' (pen.)	(Report); Live TV: GolT /	14', (red card) 64' Cissokho	Stadium: Nuevo José Zorrilla; Attendance: 15,512; Referee: (Community of Madrid) Carlos Velasco Carballo

18 November 2012 12	Getafe	2–1	Valladolid	Getafe
17:50 CET	Gavilán (yellow card) 11'; Lopo (yellow card) 35'; Alexis 73'; Lafita 78'	(Report); Live TV: GolT /	44' Óscar	Stadium: Coliseum Alfonso Pérez; Attendance: 7,000; Referee: (Aragon) Carlos Clos Gómez

24 November 2012 13	Valladolid	1–0	Granada	Valladolid
18:00 CET	Óscar (yellow card) 44'; Manucho 62'	(Report); Live TV: GolT /	(yellow card) 29' Diakhaté; (yellow card) 43' Gómez; (yellow card) 66' Benítez; (yellow card) 82' Floro Flores	Stadium: Nuevo José Zorrilla; Attendance: 13,536; Referee: (Basque Country (autonomous community)) Miguel Pérez Lasa

3 December 2012 14	Sevilla	1–2	Valladolid	Seville
21:30 CET	Navarro (yellow card) 42'; Medel (yellow card) 43' (yellow-red card) 63'; Manucho 49' (o.g.); Cala (yellow card) 53'	(Report); Live TV:	1', (yellow card) 71' Ebert; (yellow card) 10' Rukavina; 12' Óscar; (yellow card) 79' Hernández; (yellow card) 88' Peña; (yellow card) 90+1' Bueno; (yellow card) 90+4' Pérez	Stadium: Ramón Sánchez Pizjuán; Attendance: 20,000; Referee: (Cantabria) José Antonio Teixeira Vitienes

8 December 2012 15	Valladolid	2–3	Real Madrid	Valladolid
20:00 CET	Manucho 7', 21', (yellow card) 15'; Omar (yellow card) 52'; Óscar (yellow card) 83'	(Report); Live TV: GolT /	12' Benzema; 44', 71', (yellow card) 81' Özil; (yellow card) 68' Ronaldo; (yellow card) 84' Di María	Stadium: Nuevo José Zorrilla; Attendance: 22,714; Referee: (Andalusia) Pedro Pérez Montero

17 December 2012 16	Deportivo La Coruña	0–0	Valladolid	A Coruña
20:00 CET	Marchena (yellow card) 56'; Salomão (yellow card) 66'	(Report); Live TV: GolT /		Stadium: Riazor; Attendance: 24,000; Referee: (Extremadura) Jesús Gil Manzano

22 December 2012 17	Valladolid	1–3	Barcelona	Valladolid
18:00 CET	Bueno (yellow card) 25'; Sereno (yellow card) 34'; Sastre (yellow card) 51'; Óscar (yellow card) 66'; Guerra 88'	(Report); Live TV: GolT /	(yellow card) 39' Thiago; 42' Xavi; 59' Messi; 90+4' Tello	Stadium: Nuevo José Zorrilla; Attendance: 24,823; Referee: (Aragon) Carlos Clos Gómez

6 January 2013 18	Celta Vigo	3–1	Real Valladolid	Vigo
12:00 CET	Aspas 9', 39'; Varas (yellow card) 11'; Mallo (yellow card) 44'; López 51'	(Report); Live TV: GolT /	12' (pen.) Bueno; (yellow card) 29' Balenziaga; (yellow card) 41' Guerra; (yellow card) 67' Sastre	Stadium: Balaídos; Attendance: 14,913; Referee: (Community of Madrid) Carlos Velasco Carballo

12 January 2013 19	Valladolid	3–1	Mallorca	Valladolid
16:00 CET	Ebert 20', 90+3'; Sastre (yellow card) 47'; Sereno (yellow card) 58'; Óscar 87'	(Report); Live TV: GolT /	(yellow card) 23' Luna; (yellow card) 31' Geromel; 37' Víctor; (yellow card) 60' Dos Santos; (yellow card) 61' Bigas	Stadium: Nuevo José Zorrilla; Attendance: 12,949; Referee: (Canary Islands) Alejandro Hernández Hernández

20 January 2013 20	Valladolid	2–0	Zaragoza	Valladolid
17:00 CET	Guerra 11'; Omar (yellow card) 62'; Óscar 73'	(Report); Live TV: GolT /	(yellow card) 43' Lanzaro; (yellow card) 43' Apoño; (yellow card) 59' Abraham	Stadium: Nuevo José Zorrilla; Attendance: 13,058; Referee: (Community of Madrid) Carlos del Cerro Grande

26 January 2013 21	Levante	2–1	Valladolid	Valencia
18:00 CET	Martins (yellow card) 27'; Juanfran (yellow card) 39'; Barkero 43'; Iborra (yellow card) 81'; Rukavina 90' (o.g.)	(Report); Live TV: GolT /	7' Baraja; (yellow card) 25' Valiente	Stadium: Ciutat de València; Attendance: 14,100; Referee: (Catalonia) Alfonso Álvarez Izquierdo

1 February 2013 22	Valladolid	2–2	Athletic Bilbao	Valladolid
21:30 CET	Guerra 8'; Bueno 15'; Peña (yellow card) 81'	Live TV:	De Marcos 22'; Aduriz (yellow card) 36'; Susaeta 50' (yellow card) 77'	Stadium: Nuevo José Zorrilla; Attendance: 16,000; Referee: Xavier Estrada Fernández

11 February 2013 23	Betis	0–0	Valladolid	Seville
21:30 CET	Amaya (yellow card) 82' (yellow-red card) 90+3'	Live TV:	Sereno (yellow card) 18'; Rukavina (yellow card) 28' (yellow-red card) 75'; Guerra (yellow card) 40'; Sastre (yellow card) 66'	Stadium: Benito Villamarín; Attendance: 26,785; Referee: Miguel Pérez Lasa

17 February 2013 24	Valladolid	0–3	Atlético Madrid	Valladolid
19:00	Rueda (yellow card) 43'; Peña (yellow card) 48'; Óscar (yellow card) 58'; Baraja (yellow card) 90+2'	Summary	Falcao 10'; Costa 53'; Rodríguez 90'	Stadium: Nuevo José Zorrilla; Attendance: 20,007; Referee: Ignacio Iglesias Villanueva

24 February 2013 25	Rayo Vallecano	1–2	Valladolid	Madrid
12:00	Domínguez (yellow card) 42'; Amat 72'; Baptistão (yellow card) 90'	Summary	Sastre (yellow card) 68'; Sereno 71'; Manucho 80'; Bueno (yellow card) 81'	Stadium: Campo de Vallecas; Attendance: 8,921; Referee: Pedro Pérez Montero

3 March 2013 26	Espanyol	0–0	Valladolid	Cornellà de Llobregat
17:00		Summary	Larsson (yellow card) 48'	Stadium: Cornellà-El Prat; Attendance: 20,423; Referee: Antonio Mateu Lahoz

9 March 2013 27	Valladolid	1–1	Málaga	Valladolid
18:00	Manucho 41'; Balenziaga (yellow card) 78'	Summary	Demichelis 8'; Iturra (yellow card) 23'	Stadium: Nuevo José Zorrilla; Attendance: 15,420; Referee: Fernando Teixeira Vitienes

16 March 2013 28	Real Sociedad	4–1	Valladolid	San Sebastián
16:00	Griezmann 33', 44'; Aguirretxe 39'; Prieto 48'	Summary	Balenziaga (yellow card) 33'; Guerra 87'	Stadium: Anoeta; Attendance: 25,309; Referee: Carlos Clos Gómez

31 March 2013 29	Valladolid	1–3	Osasuna	Valladolid
12:00	Rubén 11' (o.g.); Rueda (yellow card) 45'	Summary	Sola 50', 60'; De las Cuevas (yellow card) 58', (goal) 69'	Stadium: Nuevo José Zorrilla; Attendance: 12,624; Referee: Miguel Pérez Lasa

7 April 2013 30	Valencia	2–1	Valladolid	Valencia
21:00	Balenziaga 39' (o.g.); Parejo (yellow card) 66'; Jonas 90+3', (yellow card) 90+4'	Summary	Sereno (yellow card) 27' (yellow-red card) 57'; Óscar 71'	Stadium: Mestalla; Attendance: 40,000; Referee: Alejandro Hernández Hernández

13 April 2013 31	Valladolid	2–1	Getafe	Valladolid
16:00	Rubio (yellow card) 6'; Óscar 68'; Guerra 73'; Sastre (yellow card) 87'	Summary	Alcácer 45'; Codina (yellow card) 55'; Lopo (yellow card) 63'; Alexis (red card) 76'	Stadium: Nuevo José Zorrilla; Attendance: 17,394; Referee: Miguel Ayza Gámez

21 April 2013 32	Granada	1–1	Valladolid	Granada
				Stadium: Nuevo Los Cármenes

28 April 2013 33	Valladolid	1–1	Sevilla	Valladolid
				Stadium: Nuevo José Zorrilla

5 May 2013 34	Real Madrid	4–3	Valladolid	Madrid
				Stadium: Santiago Bernabéu

12 May 2013 35	Valladolid	1–0	Deportivo La Coruña	A Coruña
				Stadium: Riazor

19 May 2013 36	Barcelona	2–1	Valladolid	Barcelona
				Stadium: Camp Nou

29 May 2013 37	Valladolid	0–2	Celta Vigo	Valladolid
				Stadium: Nuevo José Zorrilla

1 June 2013 38	Mallorca	4–2	Valladolid	Palma
				Stadium: Iberostar

=== Copa del Rey ===
==== Round of 32 ====
1 November 2012 First leg	Valladolid	1–0	Real Betis	Valladolid
17:00 CET	Bueno 39'; Lolo (yellow card) 55'; Sereno (red card) 64'; Neira (yellow card) 64'; Baraja (yellow card) 73'; Balenziaga (yellow card) 79'; R. Peña (yellow card) 87'	(Report); Live TV: GolT /	Paulão (yellow card) 43'	Stadium: Nuevo José Zorrilla; Attendance: 11,764; Referee: (Catalonia) Xavier Estrada Fernández

27 November 2012 Second Leg	Betis	3–0 (3–1 agg.)	Valladolid	Seville
19:30 CET	Amaya 26', (yellow card) 69'; Molina (yellow card) 38'; Castro 61'; Rueda 86' (o.g.)	(Report); Live TV: GolT (connections)	Sastre (yellow card) 27'	Stadium: Benito Villamarín; Attendance: 27,789; Referee: (Catalonia) Alfonso Álvarez Izquierdo
