= 2013–14 Real Valladolid season =

Real Valladolid
2013–14 season
- President: Carlos Suárez Sureda
- Head coach: Juan Ignacio Martínez
- Stadium: José Zorrilla
- La Liga: 19th (relegated)
- Copa del Rey: Round of 32
Home colours

The 2013–14 season was the 86th season in Real Valladolid ’s history and the 42nd in the top-tier.

== Squad ==
As June, 2014..

=== Squad and statistics ===
No.	Pos	Nat	Player	Total		Liga		Copa	
No.	Pos	Nat	Player	Apps	Goals	Apps	Goals	Apps	Goals
1	GK	(Spain) ESP	Jaime Jiménez	10	0	10	0	0	0
2	DF	(Serbia) SRB	Antonio Rukavina	35	1	34	1	1	0
3	DF	(Dominican Republic) DOM	Heinz Barmettler	1	0	1	0	0	0
4	DF	(Spain) ESP	Marc Valiente	30	1	29	1	1	0
5	MF	(Italy) ITA	Fausto Rossi	32	1	31	1	1	0
6	DF	(Spain) ESP	Jesús Rueda	36	1	35	1	1	0
7	FW	(Colombia) COL	Humberto Osorio	18	4	16	4	2	0
8	MF	(Spain) ESP	Javier Baraja	14	0	12	0	2	0
9	FW	(Spain) ESP	Javi Guerra	39	16	37	15	2	1
10	MF	(Spain) ESP	Óscar González	23	1	22	1	1	0
11	MF	(Sweden) SWE	Daniel Larsson	30	3	28	3	2	0
13	GK	(Spain) ESP	Diego Mariño	28	0	28	0	0	0
14	MF	(Spain) ESP	Omar Ramos	26	0	25	0	1	0
15	DF	(Serbia) SRB	Stefan Mitrović	16	0	16	0	0	0
16	MF	(Spain) ESP	Lluís Sastre	15	0	14	0	1	0
17	DF	(Spain) ESP	Carlos Peña	39	1	37	1	2	0
18	MF	(Spain) ESP	Álvaro Rubio	32	0	31	0	1	0
19	MF	(Albania) ALB	Valdet Rama	26	1	26	1	0	0
20	MF	(Germany) GER	Patrick Ebert	15	3	13	3	2	0
21	DF	(Morocco) MAR	Zakarya Bergdich	24	0	22	0	2	0
22	MF	(Spain) ESP	Víctor Pérez	20	1	19	1	1	0
23	FW	(Angola) ANG	Manucho	28	3	26	3	2	0
24	FW	(Spain) ESP	Jeffrén Suárez	11	0	11	0	0	0
24	DF	(Colombia) COL	Gilberto García	9	1	8	1	1	0
34	MF	(Spain) ESP	Andrés González "Zubi"	1	0	1	0	0	0

== Competitions ==
=== Overall ===
Competition	Started round	Final position / round	First match	Last match
La Liga	—	19th	17 August 2013	18 May 2014
Copa del Rey	Round of 32	Round of 32	6 December 2013	19 December 2013

Updated to match played June 2014
Source: Competitions
