= 2015–16 CD Leganés season =

CD Leganés
2015–16 season
- President: María Victoria Pavón
- Head coach: Asier Garitano
- Stadium: Butarque
Home colours

The 2015–16 season is the 88th season in CD Leganés ’s history and the 13th in the second-tier.

== Squad ==
As of 27 January 2016

Note: Flags indicate national team as defined under FIFA eligibility rules; some limited exceptions apply. Players may hold more than one non-FIFA nationality.

No.	Pos.	Nation	Player
1	GK	ESP	Queco Piña
2	DF	ESP	Unai Bustinza (on loan from Athletic Bilbao)
3	DF	ESP	Luis Ruiz
4	DF	ESP	Unai Albizua
5	DF	ARG	Martín Mantovani
6	MF	ESP	Alberto Martín
7	MF	ESP	Alain Eizmendi
8	MF	ESP	Jorge Miramón
9	FW	ESP	Guillermo (on loan from Athletic Bilbao)
10	MF	ESP	Toni Dovale
11	MF	ARG	Alexander Szymanowski
13	GK	ESP	Jon Ander Serantes

No.	Pos.	Nation	Player
14	FW	ESP	Borja Lázaro
16	DF	ESP	César Soriano
17	DF	ESP	Víctor Díaz
18	DF	ESP	Pablo Insua (on loan from Deportivo La Coruña)
19	FW	ESP	Asdrúbal (on loan from Las Palmas)
20	MF	ESP	Rubén Peña
21	MF	ESP	Iñigo Ruiz de Galarreta (on loan from Athletic Bilbao)
22	MF	ESP	Lluís Sastre
23	MF	ESP	Omar Ramos
24	MF	ESP	David Timor
26	DF	ESP	Paco Candela
29	MF	BRA	Gabriel (on loan from Juventus)

== Competitions ==
=== Overall ===
Competition	Final position
Segunda División	2nd
Copa del Rey	Round of 32

=== Liga ===
==== League table ====
Pos	Team	Pld	W	D	L	GF	GA	GD	Pts	Promotion, qualification or relegation
1	Alavés (C, P)	42	21	12	9	49	35	+14	75	Promotion to La Liga
2	Leganés (P)	42	20	14	8	59	34	+25	74	Promotion to La Liga
3	Gimnàstic	42	18	17	7	57	41	+16	71	Qualification to promotion play-offs
4	Girona	42	17	15	10	46	28	+18	66	Qualification to promotion play-offs
5	Córdoba	42	19	8	15	59	52	+7	65	Qualification to promotion play-offs

Source: LFP
Rules for classification: 1) points; 2) head-to-head points; 3) head-to-head goal difference; 4) goal difference; 5) number of goals scored
(C) Champions; (P) Promoted

==== Matches ====
Kickoff times are in CET. Win Draw Loss

Match	Opponent	Venue	Result
1	Almería	A	3–2
2	Córdoba	H	3–1
3	Zaragoza	H	1–1
4	Osasuna	A	2–1
5	Lugo	H	0–0
6	Alavés	A	0–0
7	Albacete	H	3–2
8	Tenerife	A	0–0
9	Girona	H	2–2
10	Elche	A	0–0
11	Mallorca	H	0–0
12	Valladolid	A	1–1
13	Alcorcón	H	3–0
14	Ponferradina	A	1–0
15	Bilbao Ath.	H	1–0
16	Numancia	A	1–2
17	Nàstic	H	1–0
18	Huesca	A	1–1
19	Oviedo	H	1–1
20	Llagostera	A	0–1
21	Mirandés	H	4–0

Match	Opponent	Venue	Result
22	Almería	H	2–1
23	Córdoba	A	2–3
24	Zaragoza	A	1–0
25	Osasuna	H	2–0
26	Lugo	A	1–2
27	Alavés	H	2–0
28	Albacete	A	0–3
29	Tenerife	H	0–1
30	Girona	A	1–1
31	Elche	H	0–0
32	Mallorca	A	3–0
33	Valladolid	H	4–0
34	Alcorcón	A	2–0
35	Ponferradina	H	3–0
36	Bilbao Ath.	A	1–2
37	Numancia	H	2–2
38	Nàstic	A	0–0
39	Huesca	H	2–3
40	Oviedo	A	0–1
41	Llagostera	H	2–0
42	Mirandés	A	0–1

=== Copa del Rey ===
==== 2nd round ====
Match	Date	Opponent	Venue	Result
1	9 September 2015	Tenerife	H	2–0

==== 3rd round ====
Match	Date	Opponent	Venue	Result
1	14 October 2015	Alavés	H	3–1

==== Round of 32 ====
Match	Date	Opponent	Venue	Result
1	1 December 2015	Granada	H	2–1
2	17 December 2015	Granada	A	1–0
