= Copa América Centenario Group C =

Football tournament group stage

Group C of the Copa América Centenario consisted of Mexico, Uruguay, Jamaica, and Venezuela. Matches began on June 5 and ended on June 13, 2016. All times are EDT (UTC−4).

Mexico and Venezuela advanced to the quarter-finals.

== Teams ==
Draw position	Team	Confederation	Method of qualification	Finals appearance	Last appearance	Previous best performance	FIFA Rankings	
Draw position	Team	Confederation	Method of qualification	Finals appearance	Last appearance	Previous best performance	December 2015 (Note: The rankings of December 2015 were used for seeding for the final draw, except for certain cases.)	June 2016
C1 (seed)	Mexico	CONCACAF	Automatic qualifier	10th	2015	Runners-up (1993 and 2001)	22	16
C2	Uruguay	CONMEBOL	Automatic qualifier	43rd	2015	Winners (Fifteen times)	11	9
C3	Jamaica	CONCACAF	2014 Caribbean Cup champions	2nd	2015	Group stage (2015)	54	46
C4	Venezuela	CONMEBOL	Automatic qualifier	17th	2015	Fourth place (2011)	83	77

== Standings ==
Pos	Team	Pld	W	D	L	GF	GA	GD	Pts	Qualification
1	Mexico	3	2	1	0	6	2	+4	7	Advance to knockout stage
2	Venezuela	3	2	1	0	3	1	+2	7	Advance to knockout stage
3	Uruguay	3	1	0	2	4	4	0	3	
4	Jamaica	3	0	0	3	0	6	−6	0	

Source: CONMEBOL & CONCACAF
Rules for classification: Group stage tiebreakers

In the quarter-finals:

- The winner of Group C, Mexico, advanced to play the runner-up of Group D, Chile.
- The runner-up of Group C, Venezuela, advanced to play the winner of Group D, Argentina.

== Matches ==
=== Jamaica vs Venezuela ===
The two teams had met in six previous occasions, all of them being friendlies. Their last encounter was on March 27, 2015 at the Montego Bay Sports Complex, which Jamaica won 2–1.

June 5, 2016
5:00 p.m.

Jamaica	0–1	Venezuela
	Report (CONMEBOL); Report (CONCACAF)	Martínez 15'

Soldier Field, Chicago, Illinois
Attendance: 25,560
Referee: Víctor Carrillo (Peru)

Jamaica	Venezuela

GK	1	Andre Blake
RB	15	Je-Vaughn Watson		(substituted off) 88'
CB	19	Adrian Mariappa (c)	(yellow card) 90+2'
CB	21	Jermaine Taylor
LB	20	Kemar Lawrence		(substituted off) 40'
RM	22	Garath McCleary
CM	10	Jobi McAnuff
CM	3	Michael Hector	(yellow card) 20'	(substituted off) 77'
LM	17	Rodolph Austin	(red card) 24'
CF	8	Clayton Donaldson
CF	9	Giles Barnes
Substitutions:
DF	4	Wes Morgan		(substituted on) 40'
MF	16	Lee Williamson		(substituted on) 77'
MF	12	Michael Binns		(substituted on) 88'
Manager:
(Germany) Winfried Schäfer			(red card) 46'

GK	12	Dani Hernández
RB	16	Roberto Rosales
CB	2	Wilker Ángel
CB	4	Oswaldo Vizcarrondo	(yellow card) 75'
LB	20	Rolf Feltscher
RM	15	Alejandro Guerra		(substituted off) 90+1'
CM	8	Tomás Rincón (c)
CM	5	Arquímedes Figuera	(yellow card) 45+2'
LM	13	Luis Manuel Seijas		(substituted off) 86'
CF	9	Salomón Rondón
CF	17	Josef Martínez		(substituted off) 77'
Substitutions:
MF	18	Adalberto Peñaranda		(substituted on) 77'
MF	10	Rómulo Otero		(substituted on) 86'
DF	21	Alexander González		(substituted on) 90+1'
Manager:
Rafael Dudamel

Man of the Match:
Josef Martínez (Venezuela)

Assistant referees:
Jorge Yupanqui (Peru)
Coty Carrera (Peru)
Fourth official:
Wilmar Roldán (Colombia)
Fifth official:
Javier Bustillos (Bolivia)

=== Mexico vs Uruguay ===
The two teams had met in nineteen previous encounters, the latest being a 2011 Copa América group stage match won by Uruguay with a lone goal by Álvaro Pereira.

Before the game, the stadium played the Chilean national anthem instead that of Uruguay. Tournament organizers later apologized for the incident.

June 5, 2016
8:00 p.m.

Mexico	3–1	Uruguay
Á. Pereira 4' (o.g.); Márquez 85'; Herrera 90+2'	Report (CONMEBOL); Report (CONCACAF)	Godín 74'

University of Phoenix Stadium, Glendale, Arizona
Attendance: 60,025
Referee: Enrique Cáceres (Paraguay)

Mexico	Uruguay

GK	12	Alfredo Talavera
RB	7	Miguel Layún
CB	2	Néstor Araujo
CB	5	Diego Reyes
LB	15	Héctor Moreno
CM	16	Héctor Herrera
CM	4	Rafael Márquez (c)
CM	18	Andrés Guardado	(yellow card) 26' (yellow-red card) 73'
RW	11	Javier Aquino		(substituted off) 55'
CF	14	Javier Hernández		(substituted off) 83'
LW	10	Jesús Corona		(substituted off) 61'
Substitutions:
FW	8	Hirving Lozano		(substituted on) 55'
MF	20	Jesús Dueñas		(substituted on) 61'
FW	9	Raúl Jiménez	(yellow card) 90+3'	(substituted on) 83'
Manager:
(Colombia) Juan Carlos Osorio

GK	1	Fernando Muslera
RB	16	Maxi Pereira	(yellow card) 68'
CB	2	José Maria Giménez	(yellow card) 60'
CB	3	Diego Godín (c)	(yellow card) 84'
LB	6	Álvaro Pereira
RM	5	Carlos Sánchez		(substituted off) 84'
CM	17	Egidio Arévalo Ríos
CM	15	Matías Vecino	(yellow card) 28' (yellow-red card) 45'
LM	14	Nicolás Lodeiro		(substituted off) 46'
CF	22	Diego Rolán		(substituted off) 60'
CF	21	Edinson Cavani
Substitutions:
MF	20	Álvaro González		(substituted on) 46'
FW	8	Abel Hernández		(substituted on) 60'
MF	10	Gastón Ramírez		(substituted on) 84'
Manager:
Óscar Tabárez

Man of the Match:
Rafael Márquez (Mexico)

Assistant referees:
Eduardo Cardozo (Paraguay)
Milciades Saldívar (Paraguay)
Fourth official:
Gery Vargas (Bolivia)
Fifth official:
Darío Gaona (Paraguay)

=== Uruguay vs Venezuela ===
The two teams had met in twenty-eight previous occasions, the latest being a 2014 FIFA World Cup qualifying match held at the Polideportivo Cachamay in Puerto Guayana in 2013, won by Uruguay with a lone goal scored by Edinson Cavani. Their last Copa América meeting was a 4–1 win for Uruguay in the quarterfinals of the 2007 edition.

June 9, 2016
7:30 p.m.

Uruguay	0–1	Venezuela
	Report (CONMEBOL); Report (CONCACAF)	Rondón 36'

Lincoln Financial Field, Philadelphia, Pennsylvania
Attendance: 23,002
Referee: Patricio Loustau (Argentina)

Uruguay	Venezuela

GK	1	Fernando Muslera
RB	16	Maxi Pereira
CB	2	José Maria Giménez
CB	3	Diego Godín (c)
LB	19	Gastón Silva
RM	5	Carlos Sánchez	(substituted off) 80'
CM	17	Egidio Arévalo Ríos
CM	20	Álvaro González	(substituted off) 78'
LM	10	Gastón Ramírez	(substituted off) 74'
CF	11	Cristhian Stuani
CF	21	Edinson Cavani
Substitutions:
FW	22	Diego Rolán	(substituted on) 74'
MF	14	Nicolás Lodeiro	(substituted on) 78'
DF	18	Mathías Corujo	(substituted on) 80'
Manager:
Óscar Tabárez

GK	12	Dani Hernández
RB	16	Roberto Rosales		(substituted off) 8'
CB	2	Wilker Ángel
CB	4	Oswaldo Vizcarrondo
LB	20	Rolf Feltscher
RM	15	Alejandro Guerra
CM	8	Tomás Rincón (c)
CM	5	Arquímedes Figuera	(yellow card) 42'	(substituted off) 79'
LM	18	Adalberto Peñaranda
CF	9	Salomón Rondón		(substituted off) 78'
CF	17	Josef Martínez	(yellow card) 16'
Substitutions:
DF	21	Alexander González		(substituted on) 8'
MF	13	Luis Manuel Seijas	(yellow card) 86'	(substituted on) 78'
MF	10	Rómulo Otero		(substituted on) 79'
Manager:
Rafael Dudamel

Man of the Match:
Salomón Rondón (Venezuela)

Assistant referees:
Ezequiel Brailovsky (Argentina)
Ariel Scime (Argentina)
Fourth official:
Roddy Zambrano (Ecuador)
Fifth official:
Luis Vera (Ecuador)

=== Mexico vs Jamaica ===
The two teams had met in eighteen previous occasions, the latest being the 2015 CONCACAF Gold Cup Final, won by Mexico 3–1. This marked the first time both teams faced each other in a competitive match outside of CONCACAF official competitions.

June 9, 2016
10:00 p.m.

Mexico	2–0	Jamaica
Hernández 18'; Peralta 81'	Report (CONMEBOL); Report (CONCACAF)

Rose Bowl, Pasadena, California
Attendance: 83,263
Referee: Wilton Sampaio (Brazil)

Mexico	Jamaica

GK	13	Guillermo Ochoa
CB	2	Néstor Araujo
CB	15	Héctor Moreno
CB	3	Yasser Corona
DM	4	Rafael Márquez (c)
RM	16	Héctor Herrera
AM	20	Jesús Dueñas	(substituted off) 72'
LM	7	Miguel Layún
RW	9	Raúl Jiménez
CF	14	Javier Hernández	(substituted off) 77'
LW	10	Jesús Corona	(substituted off) 63'
Substitutions:
FW	8	Hirving Lozano	(substituted on) 63'
MF	23	Jesús Molina	(substituted on) 72'
FW	19	Oribe Peralta	(substituted on) 77'
Manager:
(Colombia) Juan Carlos Osorio

GK	1	Andre Blake
RB	15	Je-Vaughn Watson	(yellow card) 28'
CB	19	Adrian Mariappa (c)
CB	4	Wes Morgan
LB	21	Jermaine Taylor
RM	22	Garath McCleary
CM	3	Michael Hector
CM	16	Lee Williamson		(substituted off) 77'
LM	10	Jobi McAnuff		(substituted off) 62'
CF	8	Clayton Donaldson
CF	9	Giles Barnes
Substitutions:
MF	12	Michael Binns		(substituted on) 62'
FW	6	Dever Orgill		(substituted on) 77'
Manager:
Miguel Coley

Man of the Match:
Javier Hernández (Mexico)

Assistant referees:
Gustavo Rossi (Argentina)
John Alexander León (Colombia)
Fourth official:
Ricardo Montero (Costa Rica)
Fifth official:
Octavio Jara (Costa Rica)

=== Mexico vs Venezuela ===
The two teams had met in ten previous occasions, the latest being a friendly played in 2012, which Mexico won 3–1. The friendly was held at the NRG Stadium, the same venue of this Copa América Centenario encounter. Their last Copa América meeting was a 1999 group stage match, also won by Mexico 3–1.

June 13, 2016
8:00 p.m.

Mexico	1–1	Venezuela
J. Corona 80'	Report (CONMEBOL); Report (CONCACAF)	Velázquez 10'

NRG Stadium, Houston, Texas
Attendance: 67,319
Referee: Yadel Martínez (Cuba)

Mexico	Venezuela

GK	1	José de Jesús Corona
RB	22	Paul Aguilar
CB	5	Diego Reyes
CB	15	Héctor Moreno
LB	6	Jorge Torres Nilo		(substituted off) 46'
CM	16	Héctor Herrera	(yellow card) 45+1'
CM	23	Jesús Molina	(yellow card) 59'	(substituted off) 68'
CM	18	Andrés Guardado (c)
RW	11	Javier Aquino		(substituted off) 18'
CF	19	Oribe Peralta
LW	8	Hirving Lozano
Substitutions:
FW	10	Jesús Corona		(substituted on) 18'
DF	7	Miguel Layún		(substituted on) 46'
FW	14	Javier Hernández		(substituted on) 68'
Manager:
(Colombia) Juan Carlos Osorio

GK	12	Dani Hernández
RB	21	Alexander González	(yellow card) 3'
CB	2	Wilker Ángel
CB	6	José Manuel Velázquez	(yellow card) 64'
LB	20	Rolf Feltscher
RM	15	Alejandro Guerra		(substituted off) 83'
CM	8	Tomás Rincón (c)
CM	13	Luis Manuel Seijas
LM	18	Adalberto Peñaranda	(yellow card) 69'
CF	19	Christian Santos	(yellow card) 52'	(substituted off) 78'
CF	7	Yonathan Del Valle		(substituted off) 65'
Substitutions:
FW	17	Josef Martínez		(substituted on) 65'
FW	9	Salomón Rondón		(substituted on) 78'
MF	10	Rómulo Otero		(substituted on) 83'
Manager:
Rafael Dudamel

Man of the Match:
Jesús Corona (Mexico)

Assistant referees:
Joe Fletcher (Canada)
Darío Gaona (Paraguay)
Fourth official:
Armando Villarreal (United States)
Fifth official:
Hiran Dopico (Cuba)

=== Uruguay vs Jamaica ===
The two teams had met in four previous occasions, the last being Jamaica's debut in the previous year's Copa América, which Uruguay won with a lone goal scored by Cristian Rodríguez.

June 13, 2016
10:00 p.m.

Uruguay	3–0	Jamaica
Hernández 21'; Watson 66' (o.g.); Corujo 88'	Report (CONMEBOL); Report (CONCACAF)

Levi's Stadium, Santa Clara, California
Attendance: 40,166
Referee: Wilson Lamouroux (Colombia)

Uruguay	Jamaica

GK	1	Fernando Muslera
RB	16	Maxi Pereira
CB	2	José Maria Giménez
CB	3	Diego Godín (c)
LB	19	Gastón Silva
RM	5	Carlos Sánchez	(substituted off) 66'
CM	17	Egidio Arévalo Ríos
CM	20	Álvaro González	(substituted off) 81'
LM	14	Nicolás Lodeiro
CF	8	Abel Hernández	(substituted off) 74'
CF	21	Edinson Cavani
Substitutions:
MF	15	Matías Vecino	(substituted on) 66'
MF	10	Gastón Ramírez	(substituted on) 74'
DF	18	Mathías Corujo	(substituted on) 81'
Manager:
Óscar Tabárez

GK	1	Andre Blake
RB	15	Je-Vaughn Watson
CB	19	Adrian Mariappa (c)
CB	4	Wes Morgan
LB	21	Jermaine Taylor
RM	22	Garath McCleary		(substituted off) 73'
CM	3	Michael Hector	(yellow card) 32'
CM	16	Lee Williamson		(substituted off) 69'
LM	10	Jobi McAnuff		(substituted off) 80'
CF	9	Giles Barnes
CF	8	Clayton Donaldson
Substitutions:
MF	17	Rodolph Austin	(yellow card) 84'	(substituted on) 69'
FW	6	Dever Orgill		(substituted on) 73'
MF	12	Michael Binns		(substituted on) 80'
Manager:
(Germany) Winfried Schäfer

Man of the Match:
Abel Hernández (Uruguay)

Assistant referees:
Alexander Guzmán (Colombia)
Corey Parker (United States)
Fourth official:
Ricardo Montero (Costa Rica)
Fifth official:
Juan Carlos Mora (Costa Rica)
