= Mathías Corujo =

Uruguayan footballer (born 1986)

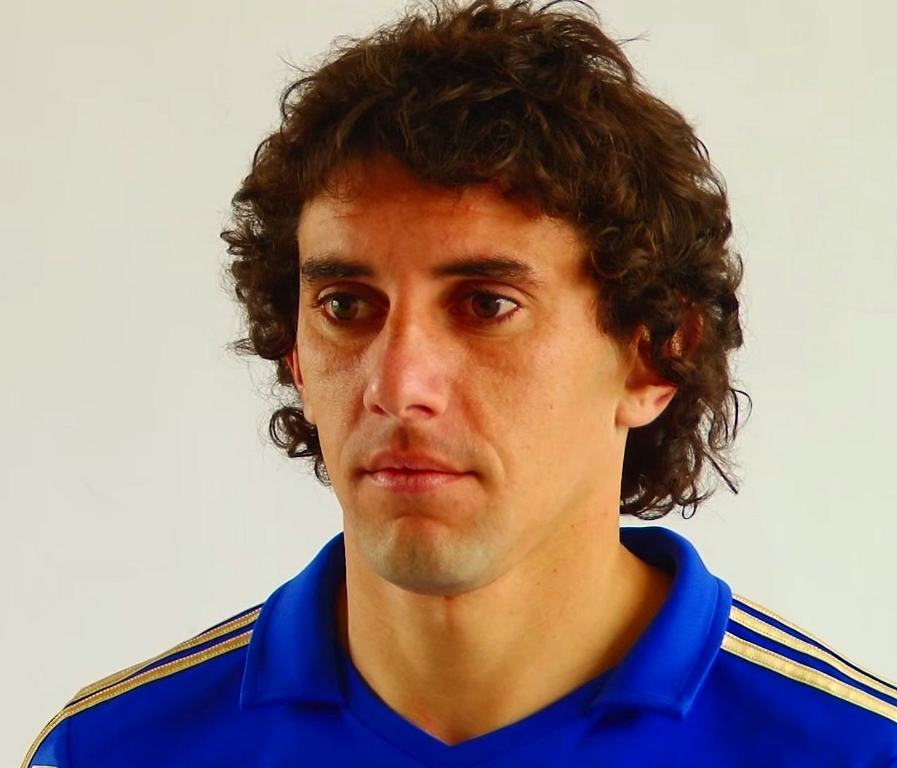

Personal information
- Full name: Mathías Corujo Díaz
- Date of birth: 8 May 1986 (age 40)
- Place of birth: Sauce, Uruguay
- Height: 1.70 m (5 ft 7 in)
- Positions: Right-back; midfielder

Team information
- Current team: Montevideo Wanderers (manager)

Youth career
- Montevideo Wanderers

Senior career*
Years	Team	Apps	(Gls)
2006–2010	Montevideo Wanderers	82	(6)
2010–2011	Peñarol	19	(3)
2011–2015	Cerro Porteño	96	(8)
2014–2015	→ Universidad de Chile (loan)	33	(5)
2015–2016	Universidad de Chile	25	(3)
2016–2017	San Lorenzo	10	(0)
2017–2019	Peñarol	23	(0)
2020	Sol de América	10	(0)
2021	Artigas		

International career
2014–2017	Uruguay	22	(1)

Managerial career
- 2023: Sportivo Bella Italia
- 2024–2025: Oriental
- 2026–: Montevideo Wanderers
- * Club domestic league appearances and goals

Mathías Corujo Díaz (born 8 May 1986) is a Uruguayan football manager and former player who played as either a right back or a midfielder. He is the current manager of Montevideo Wanderers.

== Playing career ==
On 30 December 2019 it was confirmed, that Corujo had joined Paraguayan club Club Sol de América for the 2020 season on a free transfer, having been without club since August 2019.

== Managerial career ==
On 3 June 2023, Corujo was presented as manager of Sportivo Bella Italia. On 30 December, he left the club to take over Segunda División side Oriental.

On 13 December 2025, Corujo was appointed manager of Montevideo Wanderers in the top tier.

== International goals ==
As of match played 13 June 2016. Uruguay score listed first, score column indicates score after each Corujo goal.

International goals by date, venue, cap, opponent, score, result and competition
No.	Date	Venue	Cap	Opponent	Score	Result	Competition
1	13 June 2016	Levi's Stadium, Santa Clara, United States	15	Jamaica	3–0	3–0	Copa América Centenario
