= Rubén Peña =

Spanish footballer (born 1991)

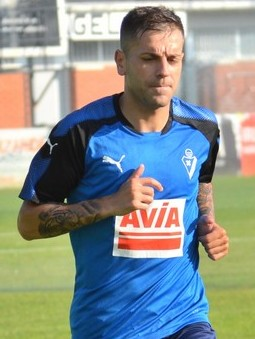
- Peña with Eibar in 2017

Personal information
- Full name: Rubén Peña Jiménez
- Date of birth: 18 July 1991 (age 35)
- Place of birth: Ávila, Spain
- Height: 1.70 m (5 ft 7 in)
- Positions: Right-back; winger

Team information
- Current team: Leganés
- Number: 7

Youth career
- Ávila

Senior career*
Years	Team	Apps	(Gls)
2010–2012	Ávila	64	(20)
2012–2013	Valladolid B	22	(1)
2012–2013	Valladolid	4	(0)
2013–2014	Guijuelo	33	(4)
2014–2016	Leganés	60	(9)
2016–2019	Eibar	87	(3)
2019–2022	Villarreal	52	(3)
2022–2025	Osasuna	74	(0)
2025–	Leganés	30	(1)
- * Club domestic league appearances and goals as of 01:10, 6 November 2026 (UTC)

Rubén Peña Jiménez (born 18 July 1991) is a Spanish professional footballer who plays as a right-back or winger for Segunda División club Leganés.

He made 217 La Liga appearances for Valladolid, Eibar, Villarreal and Osasuna, winning the Europa League with the third of those clubs in 2021.

== Career ==
=== Early career ===
Born in Ávila, Castile and León, Peña made his senior debut with local club Real Ávila CF in the Tercera División. In the summer of 2012 he signed for Real Valladolid, being initially assigned to the reserves in the same level.

Peña appeared in his first official game with the first team on 1 November 2012, playing the full 90 minutes in a 1–0 home win against Real Betis in the round of 32 of the Copa del Rey (3–1 aggregate loss). He made his La Liga debut ten days later, coming on as a late substitute in a 1–1 home draw with Valencia CF.

On 13 August 2013, Peña joined CD Guijuelo of Segunda División B. On 10 July of the following year he moved to CD Leganés, newly promoted to the Segunda División.

=== Eibar ===
On 16 June 2016, having been an important figure in Lega's first-ever promotion to the top flight, Peña signed a three-year deal with SD Eibar in the same league. He finished his first season with 28 appearances and one goal, helping to a tenth-place finish.

Peña was converted into a right-back by manager José Luis Mendilibar during 2017–18. He became a regular starter in that position the following campaign, after the departure of Ander Capa.

=== Villarreal ===
On 4 July 2019, Peña joined Villarreal CF on a five-year contract. He made his competitive debut on 17 August, starting and scoring an own goal in a 4–4 home draw against Granada CF. His first goal in the correct net came on 2 February 2020 in a 3–1 victory over CA Osasuna also at the Estadio de la Cerámica.

Peña struggled for game time after the signing of Juan Foyth in 2020, and was an unused substitute as the team won the 2021 UEFA Europa League final against Manchester United. He was put up for sale, and was due to be loaned to Deportivo Alavés at the start of 2022, but it was called off when he injured his collarbone in a cup game at Atlético Sanluqueño CF.

=== Osasuna ===
On 17 June 2022, with Foyth, Mario Gaspar and Serge Aurier ahead of him at right-back, Peña reached an agreement to terminate his Villarreal contract three years early. On the same day, he signed for Osasuna until 2025.

=== Leganés return ===
On 12 June 2025, Peña returned to Leganés after nine years, signing a two-year deal.

== Career statistics ==
As of match played 22 May 2022

Appearances and goals by club, season and competition
Club	Season	League			National Cup		Continental		Other		Total	
Club	Season	Division	Apps	Goals	Apps	Goals	Apps	Goals	Apps	Goals	Apps	Goals
Valladolid	2012–13	La Liga	4	0	2	0	—		—		6	0
Guijuelo	2013–14	Segunda División B	33	4	0	0	—		2 (Note: Appearances in Segunda División B play-offs)	0	35	4
Leganés	2014–15	Segunda División	30	1	1	0	—		—		31	1
Leganés	2015–16	Segunda División	30	8	4	1	—		—		34	9
Leganés	Total		60	7	5	1	0	0	0	0	65	10
Eibar	2016–17	La Liga	28	1	6	1	—		—		34	2
Eibar	2017–18	La Liga	28	1	2	0	—		—		30	1
Eibar	2018–19	La Liga	31	1	1	0	—		—		32	1
Eibar	Total		87	3	9	1	0	0	0	0	96	4
Villarreal	2019–20	La Liga	26	2	4	0	—		—		30	2
Villarreal	2020–21	La Liga	19	1	3	0	8 (Note: Appearances in UEFA Europa League)	0	—		30	1
Villarreal	2021–22	La Liga	7	0	2	0	2 (Note: Appearances in UEFA Champions League)	0	0	0	11	1
Villarreal	Total		52	3	9	0	10	0	0	0	71	3
Career total			236	19	25	2	10	0	2	0	273	21

== Honours ==
Villarreal

- UEFA Europa League: 2020–21

Osasuna

- Copa del Rey runner-up: 2022–23
