= Omar Ramos =

Spanish footballer

Omar
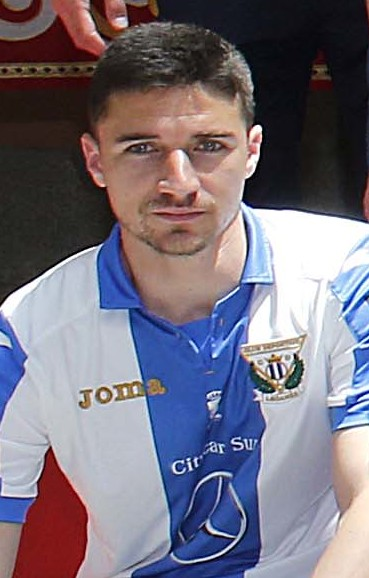
- Ramos with Leganés in 2016

Personal information
- Full name: Julián Omar Ramos Suárez
- Date of birth: 26 January 1988 (age 38)
- Place of birth: Santa Cruz de Tenerife, Spain
- Height: 1.72 m (5 ft 7 1/2 in)
- Position: Attacking midfielder

Youth career
- Tenerife

Senior career*
Years	Team	Apps	(Gls)
2006–2009	Tenerife B	65	(7)
2006–2012	Tenerife	63	(0)
2007	→ Lleida (loan)	7	(0)
2011–2012	→ Almería (loan)	8	(0)
2012	→ Huesca (loan)	20	(1)
2012–2013	Huesca	0	(0)
2012–2013	→ Valladolid (loan)	34	(1)
2013–2015	Valladolid	57	(0)
2015–2018	Leganés	72	(5)
2018–2020	Oviedo	21	(0)
2020	Ponferradina	9	(0)
2021	Alcoyano	7	(0)
2022	Rajasthan United	13	(1)
2023	Gokulam Kerala	7	(0)

International career
2009	Spain U21	1	(0)
- * Club domestic league appearances and goals as of 19:07, 12 March 2023 (UTC)

Julián Omar Ramos Suárez (born 26 January 1988), known as Omar, is a Spanish professional footballer who plays as an attacking midfielder.

He amassed La Liga totals of 120 matches and one goal over five seasons, in service of Tenerife, Valladolid and Leganés. He added 164 appearances in the Segunda División (six goals), and played abroad in India later in his career.

== Club career ==
=== Tenerife ===
Born in Santa Cruz de Tenerife, Canary Islands, Omar finished his development at local CD Tenerife. He made his professional debut on 20 September 2006 at the age of 18, coming on as a second-half substitute in a 1–2 home loss against Deportivo Alavés in the second round of the Copa del Rey, but spent the vast majority of his early spell with the reserves, also being loaned to lowly UE Lleida.

Omar was promoted to the main squad for 2009–10, with Tenerife back in La Liga after seven years. He played 23 games during the season – albeit only seven starts – as the club was immediately relegated; his first match in the competition was on 29 August 2009, when he came off the bench in a 1–0 defeat at Real Zaragoza.

=== Valladolid ===
Prior to being released in June 2012, Omar was loaned to Segunda División teams UD Almería and SD Huesca. The latter bought him on a permanent basis, loaning him immediately to Real Valladolid in the top flight.

In his debut campaign with the Castile and León side, Omar was regularly played by manager Miroslav Đukić, scoring his only goal in the Spanish top division on 1 June 2013 in a 4–2 away loss against RCD Mallorca. Subsequently, Valladolid signed him to a four-year contract.

=== Leganés ===
Omar moved to CD Leganés on 4 August 2015, agreeing to a one-year contract. On 3 July of the following year, after achieving promotion to the top tier, he renewed his link until 2018.

=== Later career ===
On 4 December 2018, free agent Omar joined second division club Real Oviedo on a 2 1/2-year deal. In January 2020, he signed an 18-month contract with SD Ponferradina of the same league.

On 26 February 2022, aged 34, Ramos moved to Rajasthan United FC on a one-year deal. He made his debut in the Indian I-League on 8 March, in a 1–0 home victory over Aizawl FC. He scored his first goal on 6 April, through a 25-meter free kick in the 2–1 defeat at Mohammedan SC.

== International career ==
Omar won his only cap for the Spain under-21 team on 17 November 2009, playing the final 16 minutes in a 2–1 away loss to the Netherlands for the 2011 UEFA European Championship qualifiers.

== Career statistics ==
As of 18 April 2023

Appearances and goals by club, season and competition
Club	Season	League			Cup		Other		Total	
Club	Season	Division	Apps	Goals	Apps	Goals	Apps	Goals	Apps	Goals
Tenerife	2004–05	Segunda División	0	0	0	0	—		0	0
Tenerife	2006–07	Segunda División	4	0	1	0	—		5	0
Tenerife	2007–08	Segunda División	1	0	1	0	—		2	0
Tenerife	2008–09	Segunda División	0	0	0	0	—		0	0
Tenerife	2009–10	La Liga	23	0	2	0	—		25	0
Tenerife	2010–11	Segunda División	35	0	1	0	—		36	0
Tenerife	Total		63	0	5	0	0	0	68	0
Lleida (loan)	2006–07	Segunda División B	7	0	0	0	—		7	0
Almería (loan)	2011–12	Segunda División	8	0	3	0	—		11	0
Huesca (loan)	2011–12	Segunda División	20	1	0	0	—		20	1
Valladolid (loan)	2012–13	La Liga	34	1	1	0	—		35	1
Valladolid	2013–14	La Liga	25	0	1	0	—		26	0
Valladolid	2014–15	Segunda División	32	0	4	0	2 (Note: Appearances in La Liga play-offs)	0	38	0
Valladolid	Total		91	1	6	0	2	0	99	1
Leganés	2015–16	Segunda División	34	5	4	2	—		38	7
Leganés	2016–17	La Liga	15	0	1	0	—		16	0
Leganés	2017–18	La Liga	23	0	3	0	—		26	0
Leganés	Total		72	5	8	2	0	0	80	7
Oviedo	2018–19	Segunda División	12	0	0	0	—		12	0
Oviedo	2019–20	Segunda División	9	0	0	0	—		9	0
Oviedo	Total		21	0	0	0	0	0	21	0
Ponferradina	2019–20	Segunda División	9	0	0	0	—		9	0
Alcoyano	2020–21	Segunda División B	7	0	0	0	—		7	0
Rajasthan United	2021–22	I-League	13	1	0	0	—		13	1
Gokulam Kerala	2022–23	I-League	7	0	4 (Note: Appearances in Super Cup)	1	—		11	1
Career total			318	8	26	3	2	0	346	11
