= Carlos Peña (Spanish footballer) =

Spanish footballer & manager (born 1983)

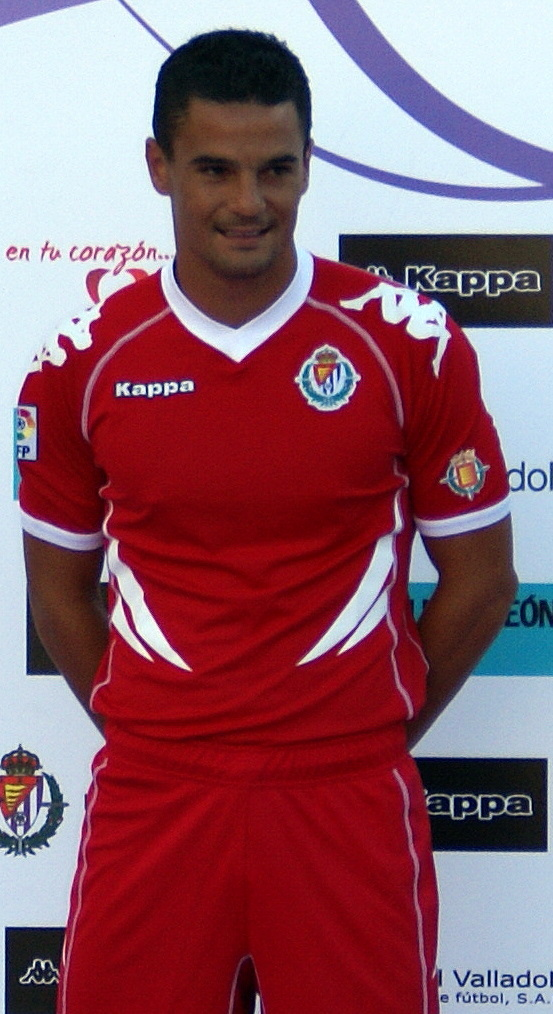
- Peña with Valladolid in 2010

Personal information
- Full name: Carlos González Peña
- Date of birth: 28 July 1983 (age 43)
- Place of birth: Salamanca, Spain
- Height: 1.81 m (5 ft 11 in)
- Position: Left-back

Team information
- Current team: Persita Tangerang (head coach)

Youth career
- Damm
- Barcelona

Senior career*
Years	Team	Apps	(Gls)
2001–2003	Barcelona C	50	(1)
2001–2006	Barcelona B	107	(6)
2006–2009	Albacete	102	(2)
2009–2010	Recreativo	30	(0)
2010–2015	Valladolid	155	(3)
2015–2016	Oviedo	41	(0)
2017	Getafe	13	(0)
2017–2018	Lorca	35	(0)
2018–2020	Goa	39	(2)
Total		572	(14)

International career
2001–2002	Spain U19	9	(0)
2003	Spain U20	11	(0)
2004–2005	Spain U21	10	(0)

Managerial career
- 2022–2023: Goa
- 2023–2024: Ratchaburi
- 2024–2025: Persija Jakarta
- 2025–: Persita Tangerang
- * Club domestic league appearances and goals

Carlos González Peña (born 28 July 1983) is a Spanish professional football manager and former player who played as a left-back. He is currently the head coach of the Indonesia Super League club, Persita Tangerang.

He amassed Segunda División totals of 322 matches and four goals, in service of six clubs. He added 54 appearances in La Liga (one goal) for Valladolid, and also played in India.

== Playing career ==
Peña was born in Salamanca, Castile and León. An unsuccessful FC Barcelona youth graduate (he only played with its C and B sides for five years), he went on to establish himself as a professional with Albacete Balompié in the Segunda División, appearing in 106 official matches over three seasons.

For the 2009–10 campaign, Peña stayed in that level as he signed with Recreativo de Huelva for four years. He continued to be first choice at his new club but, after only one season, moved to Real Valladolid, recently relegated from La Liga.

Peña contributed 35 games and one goal in his second year, helping the Pucelanos return to the top flight after two years out. He made his debut in the competition on 27 August 2012, coming on as a late substitute in a 2–0 home win against Levante UD.

Peña scored his only goal in the top tier on 11 May 2014, but also put one in his own net in a 4–3 away loss to Real Betis, and Valladolid ultimately suffered relegation. On 25 June 2015, he signed a two-year deal with Real Oviedo, newly promoted to the second division.

On 23 December 2016, the 33-year-old Peña joined Getafe CF of the same league until June 2018, after cutting ties with the Asturians. The following 19 July, he moved to Lorca FC also in division two.

On 29 July 2018, Peña moved abroad for the first time in his career and joined Indian Super League franchise FC Goa. In April 2020, he announced his retirement.

== Career statistics ==
Appearances and goals by club, season and competition
Club	Season	League			Cup		Other		Total	
Club	Season	Division	Apps	Goals	Apps	Goals	Apps	Goals	Apps	Goals
Barcelona B	2001–02	Segunda División B	1	0	—		—		1	0
Barcelona B	2002–03	Segunda División B	9	0	—		—		9	0
Barcelona B	2003–04	Segunda División B	27	0	—		—		27	0
Barcelona B	2004–05	Segunda División B	34	2	—		—		34	2
Barcelona B	2005–06	Segunda División B	36	4	—		—		36	4
Barcelona B	Total		107	6	—		—		107	6
Albacete	2006–07	Segunda División	25	0	1	0	—		26	0
Albacete	2007–08	Segunda División	41	2	2	0	—		43	2
Albacete	2008–09	Segunda División	36	0	1	0	—		37	0
Albacete	Total		102	2	4	0	—		106	2
Recreativo	2009–10	Segunda División	30	0	2	0	—		32	0
Valladolid	2010–11	Segunda División	29	0	3	0	2 (Note: Appearances in La Liga play-offs)	0	34	0
Valladolid	2011–12	Segunda División	35	1	1	0	4	0	40	1
Valladolid	2012–13	La Liga	17	0	2	0	—		19	0
Valladolid	2013–14	La Liga	37	1	2	0	—		39	1
Valladolid	2014–15	Segunda División	37	1	2	0	2	0	41	1
Valladolid	Total		155	3	10	0	8	0	173	3
Oviedo	2015–16	Segunda División	37	0	0	0	—		37	0
Oviedo	2016–17	Segunda División	4	0	1	0	—		5	0
Oviedo	Total		41	0	1	0	—		42	0
Getafe	2016–17	Segunda División	13	0	0	0	1	0	14	0
Lorca	2017–18	Segunda División	35	0	1	0	—		36	0
Goa	2018–19	Indian Super League	19	0			—		19	0
Goa	2019–20	Indian Super League	20	2			—		20	2
Goa	Total		39	2			—		39	2
Career total			522	13	18	0	9	0	549	13

== Managerial career ==
Peña worked with CF Lorca Deportiva, UCAM Murcia CF and Albacete's youth teams after retiring. On 16 April 2022, he was appointed manager of his last club Goa.

In June 2023, Peña signed as new head coach of Ratchaburi F.C. in the Thai League 1. One year later, he switched to the Liga 1 (Indonesia) with Persija Jakarta.

Peña remained in the Indonesian top division on 11 June 2025, being appointed at Persita Tangerang.

== Managerial statistics ==
As of match played 20 November 2026

Managerial record by team and tenure
Team	Nat.	From	To	Record								Ref.
Team	Nat.	From	To	G	W	D	L	GF	GA	GD	Win %	Ref.
Goa	(India)	16 April 2022	23 April 2023	23	10	3	10	41	40	+1	43.48	
Ratchaburi	(Thailand)	24 June 2023	30 June 2024	35	14	6	15	49	40	+9	40.00	
Persija Jakarta	(Indonesia)	1 July 2024	1 May 2025	35	14	9	12	48	44	+4	40.00	
Persita Tangerang	(Indonesia)	11 June 2025	Present	44	18	9	17	57	51	+6	40.91	
Career Total				137	56	27	54	195	175	+20	40.88	

== Honours ==
Goa

- ISL League Winners Shield: 2019–20
- Super Cup: 2019

Spain U19

- UEFA European Under-19 Championship: 2002

Spain U20

- FIFA U-20 World Cup runner-up: 2003

Individual

- Super League Coach of the Month: March 2026
