= Jaime Jiménez =

Spanish footballer

Personal information
- Full name: Jaime Jiménez Merlo
- Date of birth: 10 December 1980 (age 45)
- Place of birth: Valdepeñas, Spain
- Height: 1.88 m (6 ft 2 in)
- Position: Goalkeeper

Youth career
- Valdepeñas

Senior career*
Years	Team	Apps	(Gls)
1998–1999	Valdepeñas		
1999–2000	Valencia B	3	(0)
2000	Gimnàstic	0	(0)
2000–2002	Mallorca B	0	(0)
2001–2002	→ Ferriolense (loan)	29	(0)
2002–2003	Zamora	35	(0)
2003–2005	Ceuta	50	(0)
2005–2007	Ciudad Murcia	47	(0)
2007–2008	Granada 74	37	(0)
2008–2011	Elche	27	(0)
2011–2014	Valladolid	65	(0)
2014–2016	Eibar	5	(0)
Total		298	(0)
- * Club domestic league appearances and goals

Jaime Jiménez Merlo (born 10 December 1980) is a Spanish former professional footballer who played as a goalkeeper.

== Club career ==
Born in Valdepeñas, Province of Ciudad Real, Castilla–La Mancha, Jiménez played lower league football until the age of nearly 25, representing mainly AD Ceuta in the Segunda División B. In the summer of 2005 he joined Ciudad de Murcia from Segunda División, making his league debut on 13 November in a 0–2 home loss against Real Valladolid; the club was renamed Granada 74 CF for the 2007–08 season.

In 2008, Jiménez signed with Elche CF. He played understudy to Willy Caballero during most of his spell in the Valencian Community, his best year being 2010–11 when he played 19 games. He added four appearances in that campaign's unsuccessful promotion playoffs, as the Argentine had already left for Málaga CF in the winter transfer window.

Jiménez moved to fellow second-tier side Valladolid on 8 July 2011, on a 2+1 contract. He conceded only 36 goals in 41 matches in his debut season – good enough to claim the Ricardo Zamora Trophy– but, in the playoffs, suffered an injury in the first game against Córdoba CF, being relegated to the bench in favour of Dani Hernández after recovering.

Jiménez made his debut in La Liga on 20 August 2012, in a 1–0 away victory over Real Zaragoza. On 9 July 2014, following Valladolid's relegation, he agreed to a 1+1 deal at newly promoted SD Eibar.

== Career statistics ==
Appearances and goals by club, season and competition
Club	Season	League			Cup		Other		Total	
Club	Season	Division	Apps	Goals	Apps	Goals	Apps	Goals	Apps	Goals
Zamora	2002–03	Segunda División B	35	0	—		5 (Note: Appearances in Segunda División B play-offs)	0	40	0
Ceuta	2003–04	Segunda División B	12	0	2	0	—		14	0
Ceuta	2004–05	Segunda División B	38	0	3	0	2	0	43	0
Ceuta	Total		50	0	5	0	2	0	57	0
Ciudad Murcia	2005–06	Segunda División	26	0	2	0	—		28	0
Ciudad Murcia	2006–07	Segunda División	21	0	0	0	—		21	0
Ciudad Murcia	Total		47	0	2	0	—		49	0
Granada 74	2007–08	Segunda División	37	0	1	0	—		38	0
Elche	2008–09	Segunda División	6	0	2	0	—		8	0
Elche	2009–10	Segunda División	2	0	0	0	—		2	0
Elche	2010–11	Segunda División	19	0	2	0	4 (Note: Appearances in La Liga play-offs)	0	25	0
Elche	Total		27	0	4	0	4	0	35	0
Valladolid	2011–12	Segunda División	41	0	—		1	0	42	0
Valladolid	2012–13	Segunda División	14	0	2	0	—		16	0
Valladolid	2013–14	La Liga	10	0	2	0	—		12	0
Valladolid	Total		65	0	4	0	1	0	70	0
Eibar	2014–15	La Liga	5	0	0	0	—		5	0
Career total			266	0	16	0	12	0	294	0
