= Patrick Ebert =

German footballer (born 1987)

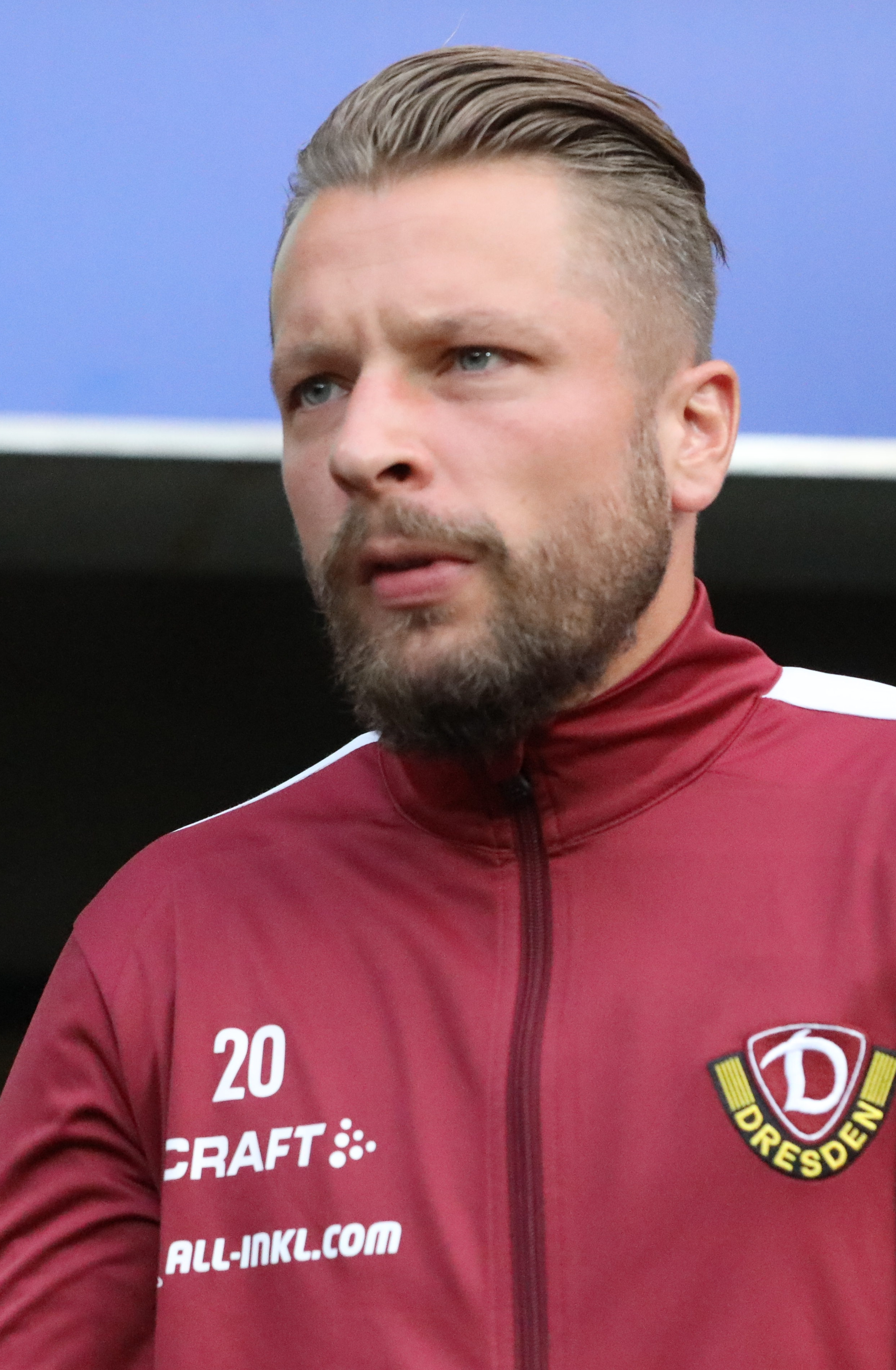
- Ebert in 2019

Personal information
- Date of birth: 17 March 1987 (age 39)
- Place of birth: Potsdam, East Germany
- Height: 1.76 m (5 ft 9 in)
- Position: Winger

Youth career
- 1991–1993: TuS Gaarden
- 1993–1998: TSV Russee
- 1998–2004: Hertha BSC

Senior career*
Years	Team	Apps	(Gls)
2004–2006	Hertha BSC II	43	(7)
2006–2012	Hertha BSC	121	(8)
2012–2014	Valladolid	36	(9)
2014–2015	Spartak Moscow	23	(0)
2015–2017	Rayo Vallecano	36	(5)
2018	FC Ingolstadt	4	(0)
2018	FC Ingolstadt II	1	(0)
2018–2020	Dynamo Dresden	49	(4)
2020–2021	Xanthi	22	(3)
2022	Kavala	19	(2)
2022	İstanbulspor	7	(0)
Total		361	(38)

International career
2007–2009	Germany U21	13	(1)
- * Club domestic league appearances and goals

Patrick Ebert (born 17 March 1987) is a German former professional footballer who played as a winger.

== Playing career ==
=== Hertha ===
Born in Potsdam, East Germany, Ebert started playing football for TuS Gaarden in Kiel at the age of four. He completed his development with Hertha BSC, joining the Berlin-based club in 1998.

Ebert made his official debut with the first team on 16 July 2006, coming on as an 81st-minute substitute in a 0–0 home draw against FC Moscow in that year's UEFA Intertoto Cup. He first appeared in the Bundesliga on 13 August, again coming from the bench in the 0–0 draw at VfL Wolfsburg, and scored his first goal in the competition the following matchday when he opened a 4–0 home rout of Hannover 96.

Ebert contributed 16 games and one goal in the 2009–10 season, as the Blue-Whites were ultimately relegated to the 2. Bundesliga. On 6 June 2012, he was released along with Christian Lell, Andre Mijatović and Andreas Ottl.

=== Valladolid ===
Ebert signed with Spain's Real Valladolid on 27 July 2012. He made his first La Liga appearance on 20 August, playing 86 minutes in a 1–0 away win over Real Zaragoza.

Ebert netted six times in his first year with the Castile and León side– including twice in the 3–1 home victory against Mallorca– being first choice in a final escape from relegation.

=== Spartak Moscow ===
On 7 February 2014, Ebert was released from his contract with Valladolid, after having already announced the decision to wanting to leave the club and having subjected to disciplinary procedures after refusing to play against Villarreal. Later that day, he signed with Spartak Moscow of the Russian Premier League.

=== Rayo Vallecano ===
Ebert returned to Spain on 25 July 2015, joining Rayo Vallecano on a two-year contract. He missed the vast majority of his debut season due to an achilles tendon rupture.

=== Later years ===
The following two and a half seasons, Ebert competed in the German second division with FC Ingolstadt 04 and Dynamo Dresden. In October 2020, the 33-year-old free agent signed a one-year deal with Xanthi of the Super League Greece 2.

Ebert joined İstanbulspor on 26 July 2022, from Kavala also in the Greek second tier.

== Coaching career ==
In June 2024 Ebert became part of the coaching staff at Hertha BSC under head coach Cristian Fiél.

== Career statistics ==
Appearances and goals by club, season and competition
Club	Season	League			Cup		Continental		Other		Total	
Club	Season	Division	Apps	Goals	Apps	Goals	Apps	Goals	Apps	Goals	Apps	Goals
Hertha BSC II	2004–05	Regionalliga Nord	2	0	—		—		—		2	0
Hertha BSC II	2005–06	Regionalliga Nord	30	6	—		—		—		30	6
Hertha BSC II	2006–07	Regionalliga Nord	7	1	—		—		—		7	1
Hertha BSC II	2008–09	Regionalliga Nord	3	0	—		—		—		3	0
Hertha BSC II	2009–10	Regionalliga Nord	1	0	—		—		—		1	0
Hertha BSC II	Total		43	7	0	0	0	0	0	0	43	7
Hertha BSC	2006–07	Bundesliga	19	2	2	0	5	0	—		26	2
Hertha BSC	2007–08	Bundesliga	27	1	2	1	—		—		29	2
Hertha BSC	2008–09	Bundesliga	21	3	1	1	4	1	—		26	5
Hertha BSC	2009–10	Bundesliga	16	1	2	0	5	0	—		23	1
Hertha BSC	2010–11	2. Bundesliga	12	1	0	0	—		—		12	1
Hertha BSC	2011–12	Bundesliga	26	0	4	2	—		2 (Note: Appearances in relegation play-offs)	0	32	2
Hertha BSC	Total		121	8	11	4	14	1	2	0	148	13
Valladolid	2012–13	La Liga	23	6	0	0	—		—		23	6
Valladolid	2013–14	La Liga	13	3	2	0	—		—		15	3
Valladolid	Total		36	9	2	0	0	0	0	0	38	9
Spartak Moscow	2013–14	Russian Premier League	6	0	1	0	0	0	—		7	0
Spartak Moscow	2014–15	Russian Premier League	17	0	1	0	—		—		18	0
Spartak Moscow	Total		23	0	2	0	0	0	0	0	25	0
Rayo Vallecano	2015–16	La Liga	9	0	1	1	—		—		10	1
Rayo Vallecano	2016–17	Segunda División	27	5	1	0	—		—		28	5
Rayo Vallecano	Total		36	5	2	1	0	0	0	0	38	6
FC Ingolstadt	2017–18	2. Bundesliga	4	0	1	0	—		—		5	0
FC Ingolstadt II	2017–18	Regionalliga Bayern	1	0	—		—		—		1	0
Dynamo Dresden	2018–19	2. Bundesliga	28	3	1	0	—		—		29	3
Dynamo Dresden	2019–20	2. Bundesliga	21	1	1	1	—		—		22	2
Dynamo Dresden	Total		49	4	2	1	0	0	0	0	51	5
Xanthi	2020–21	Super League Greece 2	22	3	—		—		2 (Note: Appearances in play-offs)	0	24	3
Kavala	2021–22	Super League Greece 2	19	2	—		—		—		19	2
İstanbulspor	2022–23	Süper Lig	7	0	1	0	—		—		8	0
Career total			361	38	21	6	14	1	4	0	400	45

== Honours ==
Germany

- UEFA European Under-21 Championship: 2009
