= Pesca (footballer) =

Spanish footballer

Personal information
- Full name: Jorge González Moral
- Date of birth: 24 February 1992 (age 34)
- Place of birth: Burgos, Spain
- Height: 1.80 m (5 ft 11 in)
- Position: Midfielder

Team information
- Current team: Atlético Tordesillas

Senior career*
Years	Team	Apps	(Gls)
2012–2014	Real Valladolid B	62	(1)
2014–2015	Villarreal C	4	(1)
2015	Alavés B		
2015–2016	Rayo Majadahonda	3	(0)
2016–2017	Guadalajara	34	(2)
2017–2018	Kapfenberger SV	31	(0)
2018–	Arandina	11	(0)
2019	→ Logroñés (loan)	0	(0)
2021–2022	Guijuelo	20	(2)
2022–2024	Arandina	51	(5)
2024–2025	Almazán	33	(5)
2025–	Atlético Tordesillas	4	(0)
- * Club domestic league appearances and goals as of 27 September 2025

Jorge González Moral (born 24 February 1992), commonly known as Pesca, is a Spanish footballer who plays as a midfielder for Tercera Federación club Atlético Tordesillas.

== Club career ==
Born in Burgos, Pesca kicked off his youth career with the youth team of Atletico Michelin. Later he joined Arandina and after two seasons, he moved to the youth team of Burgos. He received interest of various clubs like Numancia but signed for Real Valladolid where he was assigned to the B team in 2012. In June of the same year, he received a call up from the first team manager Miroslav Đukić to train with the senior squad in the pre season. He injured his right ankle while training in October and was ruled out of play for three weeks. In November, it was announced that the Đukić had called him to the first team for the club's last four matches of the season.

In July 2014, without having made any appearance for the senior team, Pesca signed for the C team of Villarreal. He made his league debut for the club in the month of November against Muro. Coming as an 82nd minute substitute, he found the net in the 93rd minute while resulted in the match ending in a draw. After a short stint with Alavés B, he moved to Rayo Majadahonda in August 2015 which competed in Segunda División B.

After a single season with Tercera División club Guadalajara of the third tier, in 2017 Pesca moved abroad for the time and signed for Austrian Football First League side Kapfenberger SV joining Spaniard David Agudo.

In July 2018, Pesca joined Arandina. He was loaned out to SD Logroñés on 24 January 2019 for the rest of the season.

== Career statistics ==
As of match played on 4 May 2018

Club	Season	League			Cup		Other		Total	
Club	Season	Division	Apps	Goals	Apps	Goals	Apps	Goals	Apps	Goals
Real Valladolid B	2012–13	Tercera División	31	0	—		—		31	0
Real Valladolid B	2013–14	Tercera División	30	1	—		2 (Note: Appearances in Promotion Play-offs)	0	32	1
Real Valladolid B	Total		61	1	—		2	0	63	1
Villarreal C	2014–15	Tercera División	4	1	—		—		4	1
Alavés B	2014–15	Tercera División			—		—			
Rayo Majadahonda	2015–16	Segunda División B	3	0	1	0	—		4	0
Guadalajara	2016–17	Tercera División	34	1	0	0	2	0	36	1
Kapfenberger SV	2017–18	Erste Liga	29	0	2	0	—		31	0
Career total			131	3	3	0	4	0	138	3
