= Paco Candela =

Spanish footballer

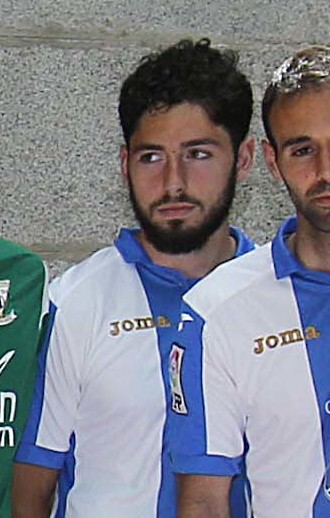
- Candela with Leganés in 2016

Personal information
- Full name: Francisco Antonio Candela Pascual
- Date of birth: 19 January 1993 (age 33)
- Place of birth: Alicante, Spain
- Height: 1.84 m (6 ft 0 in)
- Positions: Centre back; midfielder

Team information
- Current team: Linense
- Number: 15

Youth career
- Villarreal

Senior career*
Years	Team	Apps	(Gls)
2012–2013	Villarreal C	22	(2)
2013–2016	Leganés	42	(3)
2015	→ Sevilla B (loan)	14	(0)
2016–2018	Fuenlabrada	41	(1)
2018–2019	Hércules	28	(0)
2019	La Nucía	0	(0)
2019	CF Intercity	8	(2)
2020	Mérida	1	(0)
2020–	Linense	4	(1)
- * Club domestic league appearances and goals as of 21:10, 2 January 2021 (UTC)

Francisco 'Paco' Antonio Candela Pascual (born 19 January 1993) is a Spanish footballer who plays for Real Balompédica Linense. Mainly a central defender, he can also play as a defensive midfielder.

== Club career ==
Born in Alicante, Valencian Community, Candela graduated with Villarreal CF's youth setup, and made his senior debuts with the C-team in the 2011–12 campaign, in Tercera División. On 20 August 2013 he moved to Segunda División B's CD Leganés, featuring in 29 matches during his first season, which ended in promotion.

On 6 August 2014 Candela signed a new two-year deal with the Madrid side. On 11 September he made his professional debut, starting in a 1–1 home draw against CD Numancia, for the campaign's Copa del Rey.

On 16 January 2015 Candela was loaned to Sevilla Atlético, until June. He subsequently returned to Lega after his loan expired and scored his first professional goal on 23 August, netting his team's first in a 2–3 away loss against UD Almería through a free kick.

Candela joined Mérida AD on 3 January 2020. However, after only one game for the club, Paco got problems with his knee and was out for the rest of his spell at the club. In the summer 2020, Paco then signed with Linense. After four games for the club, he hurt his knee again at the end of November 2020 and underwent a arthroscopy to repair the external meniscus of his right knee, in which he suffered a partial tear. Paco was set to be out for two months.
