= Miguel Coley =

Jamaican football manager (born 1982)

Miguel Coley (born September 29, 1982) is a Jamaican football manager and former player.

== Life and career ==
Coley was born on 29 September 1982 in Jamaica. He played volleyball, cricket, and basketball. He attended Mico University College in Jamaica. As a footballer, he mainly operated as an attacking player. In 2005, he retired from playing football because of an injury. He has worked as a physical education teacher. Coley managed Jamaica College in Jamaica, helping the team win the league.

Career Overview

Coley began his career as a player but retired in 2005 due to injury. He then transitioned to coaching, building a significant reputation in both schoolboy football in Jamaica and at the professional level internationally.

Club Coaching:

He has held assistant coaching roles at various clubs across the Middle East, including Esteghlal in Iran, Baniyas in the UAE, and Al-Khor and Umm Salal in Qatar. He briefly served as an interim head coach for Umm Salal in late 2024. He currently works as an assistant coach for Zakho SC in Iraq.

National Team Coaching: Coley previously served as an assistant coach for the Jamaica national team from 2014 to 2016. Winning the Caribbean Cup in 2014 and playing in the finals of the Gold Cup in 2015. Along with Coach Schaefer, Coley coached in two COPAAMERICA (2015&2016) being the head coach of Jamaica versus Mexico in Rose Bowl California. In November 2025, he returned to the national setup as an interim assistant coach, working alongside interim head coach to prepare the team for the FIFA World Cup inter-confederation playoffs in March 2026.

Education and Philosophy: Coley holds an AFC Pro License and has worked as a physical education teacher. He is known for his dedication and attention to detail, using a philosophy he describes as the "three P's of success: good people, good place and good program".

Achievements: Promoting Barbican to Jamaica Premier League Caribbean Cup winner 2014, CFU Gold Cup Runners up 2015, CONCACAF Reserve league champion 2021/22, Qatar Hazfi Cup Champion 2018, Iran Five Consecutive Manning Cup, Jamaica 2013–2017 Five Consecutive Olivier Shield, Jamaica 2013–2017 Super Cup 2014, Jamaica Walker Cup 2017, Jamaica

Recent News Coley's return to the Jamaican national team has been a major topic in local sports news, especially after the team missed automatic World Cup qualification. Many local commentators and fans have expressed the opinion that he is qualified for the head coach position. Coley has stated that he is honored to be back and is focused entirely on the immediate goal of qualifying the team for the 2026 World Cup.
