= Zubi =

Spanish footballer

Personal information
- Full name: Andrés González Jaén
- Date of birth: 21 May 1993 (age 33)
- Place of birth: Cáceres, Spain
- Height: 1.77 m (5 ft 10 in)
- Position: Winger

Team information
- Current team: Cacereño

Youth career
- Valladolid

Senior career*
Years	Team	Apps	(Gls)
2012–2014	Valladolid B	67	(14)
2013	Valladolid	1	(0)
2014–2016	Atlético Madrid B	2	(0)
2015	→ Rayo Majadahonda (loan)	13	(1)
2016–	Cacereño	6	(0)
- * Club domestic league appearances and goals as of 12 March 2016

Andrés González Jaén (born 21 May 1993), commonly known as Zubi, is a Spanish footballer who plays for Cacereño as a left winger.

== Club career ==
Zubi was born in Cáceres, Extremadura. He played youth football with Real Valladolid, making his debut as a senior in the 2012–13 season with the reserves in Tercera División.

On 30 October 2013 Zubi made his first team – and La Liga – debut, playing the last two minutes in a 2–2 home draw against Real Sociedad. On 17 July of the following year he moved to another reserve team, Atlético Madrid B in Segunda División B.
