= Dani Hernández =

Venezuelan footballer (born 1985)

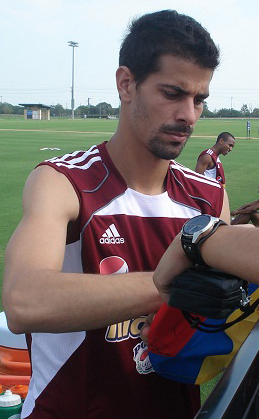
- Hernández training with Venezuela in 2012

Personal information
- Full name: Daniel Hernández Santos
- Date of birth: 21 October 1985 (age 41)
- Place of birth: Caracas, Venezuela
- Height: 1.96 m (6 ft 5 in)
- Position: Goalkeeper

Youth career
- Tenerife

Senior career*
Years	Team	Apps	(Gls)
2002–2004	Rayo Majadahonda	1	(0)
2004	Guadalajara		
2004–2005	Collado Villaba		
2005–2007	Real Madrid C	1	(0)
2007–2008	Rayo Vallecano B	28	(0)
2007–2010	Rayo Vallecano	0	(0)
2008–2009	→ Jaén (loan)	38	(0)
2009–2010	→ Huesca (loan)	0	(0)
2010	→ Valencia B (loan)	16	(0)
2010–2011	Murcia	1	(0)
2011–2015	Valladolid	29	(0)
2013–2014	→ Asteras Tripolis (loan)	18	(0)
2015–2022	Tenerife	207	(0)
2022–2023	Fuenlabrada	11	(0)
Total		350	(0)

International career
2010–2016	Venezuela	31	(0)
- * Club domestic league appearances and goals

Daniel 'Dani' Hernández Santos (born 21 October 1985) is a Venezuelan former professional footballer who played as a goalkeeper.

== Club career ==
=== Early career ===
Born in Caracas, Hernández played Spanish lower league and amateur football until the age of 25, competing mainly in the Community of Madrid. During that time, he represented CF Rayo Majadahonda, CD Guadalajara, CU Collado Villalba, Real Madrid C, Rayo Vallecano B, Real Jaén, Valencia CF Mestalla and Real Murcia CF, delivering a Player of the match performance on 26 October 2010 in a 0–0 home draw against Real Madrid in the round of 32 of Copa del Rey (5–1 aggregate loss). Additionally, he represented SD Huesca in the Segunda División in the first part of the 2009–10 campaign, but his input consisted of two domestic cup appearances.

=== Valladolid ===
On 19 August 2011, Hernández signed a 1+2 contract with Real Valladolid in division two. He spent the vast majority of his first year as understudy to Jaime but, due to injury to his teammate, excelled in the promotion playoffs as the team returned to La Liga after a two-year absence, conceding only once in four appearances and three starts.

Hernández continued to be first choice in the 2012–13 season, helping the Castile and León side retain their league status after ranking in 14th position. After a one-year loan in the Super League Greece with Asteras Tripolis FC, he acted as backup to Javi Varas.

=== Tenerife ===
On 15 January 2015, free agent Hernández joined second-tier CD Tenerife on a short-term deal. In May 2018, he became the club's third goalkeeper with the most matches in Spanish competitions, at 138.

Hernández subsequently played second-fiddle to Juan Soriano.

=== Fuenlabrada ===
On 14 July 2022, the 36-year-old Hernández signed a two-year contract with CF Fuenlabrada, recently relegated to the Primera Federación.

== International career ==
Hernández made his debut for Venezuela on 7 September 2010, in a 1–0 friendly win with Ecuador. As a backup, he was part of the squad that appeared at the 2011 Copa América in Argentina.

== Personal life ==
Hernández's older brother, Jonay, was also a footballer. A defender, he too spent most of his professional career in Spain, also appearing for the Venezuela national team.

== Career statistics ==
=== Club ===
As of 16 May 2021

Appearances and goals by club, season and competition
Club	Season	League			Cup		Europe		Other		Total	
Club	Season	Division	Apps	Goals	Apps	Goals	Apps	Goals	Apps	Goals	Apps	Goals
Rayo Majadahonda	2003–04	Segunda División B	1	0	0	0	–		0	0	1	0
Rayo Vallecano	2007–08	Segunda División B	0	0	0	0	–		0	0	0	0
Jaén	2008–09	Segunda División B	38	0	0	0	–		6 (Note: Appearances in 2009 Segunda División B play-offs)	0	44	0
Huesca (loan)	2009–10	Segunda División	0	0	2	0	–		0	0	2	0
Valencia B (loan)	2009–10	Segunda División B	16	0	0	0	–		0	0	16	0
Murcia	2010–11	Segunda División B	1	0	3	0	–		0	0	4	0
Valladolid	2011–12	Segunda División	2	0	2	0	–		4 (Note: Appearances in 2012 Segunda División play-offs)	0	8	0
Valladolid	2012–13	La Liga	24	0	0	0	–		0	0	24	0
Valladolid	2014–15	Segunda División	3	0	3	0	–		0	0	6	0
Valladolid	Total		29	0	5	0	0	0	4	0	38	0
Asteras Tripolis (loan)	2013–14	Super League Greece	18	0	1	0	0	0	6 (Note: Appearances in Super League Greece play-offs)	0	25	0
Tenerife	2014–15	Segunda División	20	0	0	0	–		0	0	20	0
Tenerife	2015–16	Segunda División	39	0	0	0	–		0	0	39	0
Tenerife	2016–17	Segunda División	38	0	0	0	–		4 (Note: Appearances in 2016 Segunda División play-offs)	0	42	0
Tenerife	2017–18	Segunda División	38	0	0	0	–		0	0	38	0
Tenerife	2018–19	Segunda División	40	0	0	0	–		0	0	40	0
Tenerife	2019–20	Segunda División	6	0	2	0	–		0	0	8	0
Tenerife	2020–21	Segunda División	25	0	1	0	–		0	0	26	0
Tenerife	Total		206	0	3	0	0	0	4	0	213	0
Career total			308	0	14	0	0	0	20	0	342	0

=== International ===
Appearances and goals by national team and year
National team	Year	Apps	Goals
Venezuela	2010	2	0
Venezuela	2011	1	0
Venezuela	2012	5	0
Venezuela	2013	7	0
Venezuela	2014	4	0
Venezuela	2015	1	0
Venezuela	2016	11	0
Total		31	0
