= Óscar González (Spanish footballer) =

Spanish footballer (born 1982)

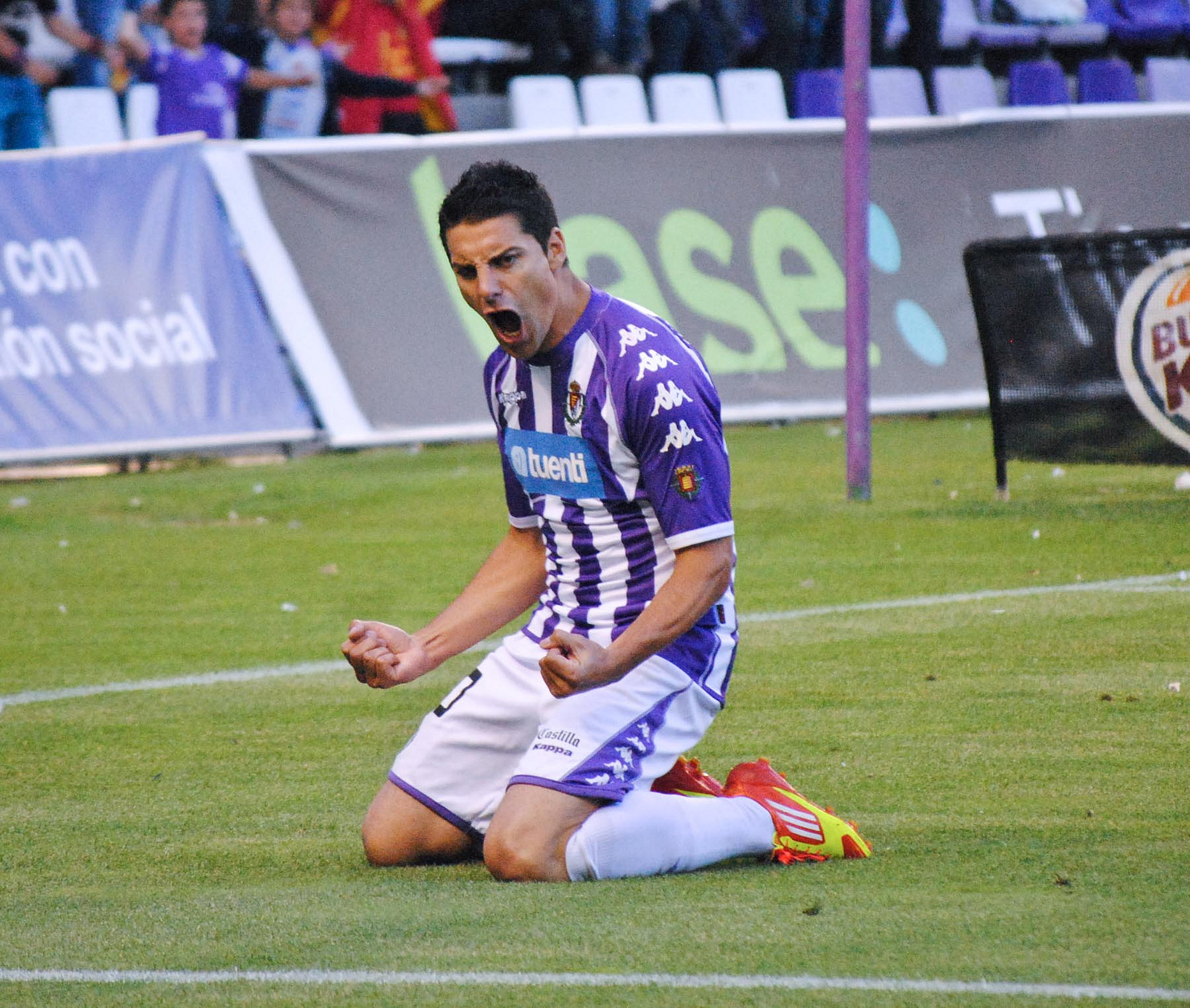
- González scoring for Valladolid in 2012

Personal information
- Full name: Óscar Javier González Marcos
- Date of birth: 12 November 1982 (age 43)
- Place of birth: Salamanca, Spain
- Height: 1.81 m (5 ft 11 in)
- Position: Attacking midfielder

Youth career
- Santa Marta
- Valladolid

Senior career*
Years	Team	Apps	(Gls)
2001	Valladolid B	2	(0)
2001–2004	Valladolid	81	(13)
2004–2008	Zaragoza	129	(14)
2008–2010	Olympiacos	45	(5)
2010–2016	Valladolid	181	(53)
Total		438	(85)

International career
2001	Spain U18	5	(1)
- * Club domestic league appearances and goals

Óscar Javier González Marcos (Spanish pronunciation: [ˈoskaɾ xaˈβjeɾ ɣonˈsa.les]; born 12 November 1982) is a Spanish former professional footballer who played as an attacking midfielder.

He appeared in 267 La Liga matches over nine seasons, totalling 40 goals for Valladolid (two spells) and Zaragoza. He also spent two years in Greece with Olympiacos.

== Career ==
=== Early career ===
Born in Salamanca, Region of León, González began his career with Real Valladolid, making his first-team – and La Liga – debut in the 1–0 home win over UD Las Palmas on 7 October 2001, one month shy of his 19th birthday. Establishing himself as a regular by the start of the 2002–03 season, he was their best scorer in the following year at 10, in spite of a final relegation.

=== Zaragoza ===
Subsequently, González moved to Real Zaragoza where he was a regular fixture throughout four seasons, whether as a starter or a substitute. His best scoring output came during his first season, with six goals (two being in a 2–2 draw at CA Osasuna).

=== Olympiacos ===
After Zaragoza's relegation in 2007–08, González joined Olympiacos F.C. in the summer transfer window on a three-year deal, joining his compatriot Ernesto Valverde's roster. During his two-year spell, he totalled 68 games and netted nine times while providing five assists.

Helping the Piraeus side to the double in his debut campaign, González also scored in the UEFA Cup, in a 2–1 away loss against AS Saint-Étienne (5–2 aggregate loss) in the round of 32.

=== Return to Valladolid ===
On 1 September 2010, Olympiacos parted ways with González, who signed a one-year contract with his first professional club Valladolid, now playing in the Segunda División. On 20 July 2011, he signed a two-year extension with the option of making his link a permanent one.

González scored 14 goals in the 2011–12 season, as the Pucelanos returned to the top flight after two years. Being deployed more often as a second striker in 2014–15, he bettered that total to 16 as the team again competed in the second tier.

After retiring, González owned a restaurant in Valladolid. In June 2024, he returned to his main club as youth coach.

== Honours ==
Olympiacos

- Super League Greece: 2008–09
- Greek Football Cup: 2008–09
