= Lluís Sastre =

Spanish footballer

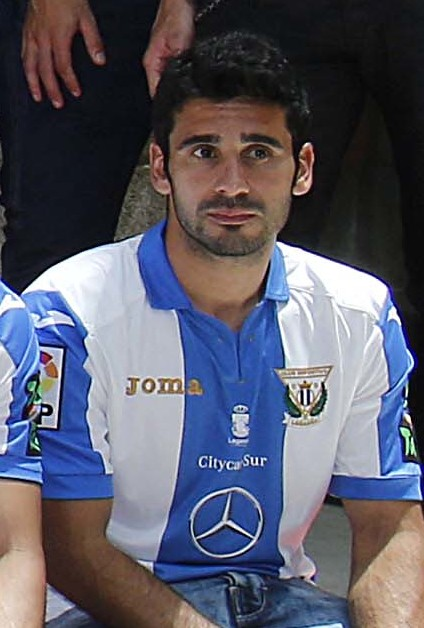
- Sastre with Leganés in 2016

Personal information
- Full name: Lluís Sastre Reus
- Date of birth: 26 March 1986 (age 40)
- Place of birth: Binissalem, Spain
- Height: 1.74 m (5 ft 8 1/2 in)
- Position: Central midfielder

Youth career
- 1998–2005: Barcelona

Senior career*
Years	Team	Apps	(Gls)
2005–2006	Barcelona C	31	(6)
2005–2007	Barcelona B	33	(0)
2007–2008	Zaragoza	0	(0)
2007–2008	→ Huesca (loan)	36	(2)
2008–2012	Huesca	110	(1)
2012–2015	Valladolid	63	(1)
2015–2016	Leganés	34	(3)
2017–2019	Huesca	52	(2)
2019–2020	AEK Larnaca	26	(0)
2020–2021	Hyderabad	12	(0)
2021–2022	Huesca B	8	(0)
Total		405	(15)

International career
2005	Spain U19	2	(0)
- * Club domestic league appearances and goals

Lluís Sastre Reus (born 26 March 1986) is a Spanish former professional footballer who played as a central midfielder.

== Club career ==
Sastre was born in Binissalem, Mallorca, Balearic Islands. He emerged through FC Barcelona's youth ranks, but only represented its B and C sides.

Acquired by Real Zaragoza in 2007, Sastre moved immediately to another club, Aragonese neighbours SD Huesca, helping it promote to Segunda División in his first season – a first-ever – and easily retain its status the following campaign. His first game as a professional took place on 31 August 2008, as he featured the full 90 minutes in a 2–2 home draw against CD Castellón.

In summer 2012, Sastre signed a three-year contract with Real Valladolid. He made his La Liga debut on 20 August, coming on as a 78th-minute substitute for Álvaro Rubio in a 1–0 away win over Real Zaragoza; he finished the campaign with 29 games (13 starts) and one goal, helping his team finish 14th.

After being relegated in 2014, Sastre continued competing in the second tier with Valladolid and CD Leganés. He achieved promotion to the top flight with the latter in 2016, contributing three goals from 33 appearances to this feat.

On 29 December 2016, Sastre cut ties with Leganés and signed a two-and-a-half-year deal with Huesca. The 32-year-old moved abroad in January 2019, joining a host of compatriots at Cypriot First Division's AEK Larnaca FC.

Sastre took his game to the Indian Super League on 8 September 2020, agreeing to a one-year contract at Hyderabad FC. He started in nine of his appearances, adding an assist for the fifth-placed team.

On 28 July 2021, Sastre returned to Spain and joined SD Huesca B. The following 24 February, he announced his retirement at the age of 35.

== Personal life ==
Sastre's older brother, Rafel (ten years his senior), was also a footballer. A defender, he played mainly for Sporting de Gijón, and they coincided at Huesca in the 2011–12 season.
