= Álvaro Rubio =

Spanish footballer

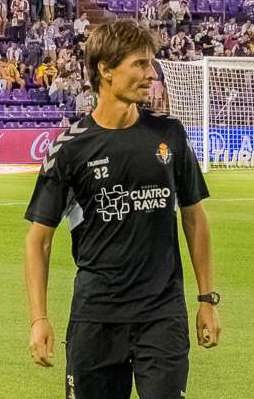
- Rubio with Valladolid in 2018

Personal information
- Full name: Álvaro Rubio Robles
- Date of birth: 18 April 1979 (age 47)
- Place of birth: Logroño, Spain
- Height: 1.78 m (5 ft 10 in)
- Position: Defensive midfielder

Team information
- Current team: Olympiacos B (manager)

Youth career
- 1994–1998: Zaragoza

Senior career*
Years	Team	Apps	(Gls)
1998–2001	Zaragoza B	61	(2)
1999–2000	Zaragoza	0	(0)
2000	→ Albacete (loan)	15	(0)
2000–2006	Albacete	163	(0)
2006–2016	Valladolid	294	(8)
2016	Bengaluru	0	(0)
Total		533	(10)

International career
1999	Spain U20	1	(0)
1999	Spain U21	1	(1)

Managerial career
- 2023–2025: Valladolid B
- 2024: Valladolid (caretaker)
- 2025: Valladolid
- 2025–: Olympiacos B
Medal record
Representing Spain
Men's football
FIFA World Youth Championship
Winner	1999 Nigeria
- * Club domestic league appearances and goals

Álvaro Rubio Robles (born 18 April 1979) is a Spanish former professional footballer who played as a defensive midfielder, currently manager of Super League Greece 2 club Olympiacos B.

He spent most of his career with Valladolid, appearing in 310 games in all competitions. He also represented Albacete in La Liga, totalling 204 matches over eight seasons (four goals).

== Club career ==
=== Early years ===
Born in Logroño, La Rioja, Rubio began his professional career with Real Zaragoza, but never made it past the reserves. In January 2000, he moved to Albacete – first on loan – where, after a slow start, he became a very important unit for the Castilla–La Mancha side in the Segunda División.

After 25 matches in the 2002–03 season, as Albacete returned to La Liga after a seven-year absence, Rubio made his top-division debut on 26 October 2003 in a 3–2 away loss against Real Betis where he came on as a 27th-minute substitute. He made a further 50 appearances until June 2005, when the team were relegated.

=== Valladolid ===
For the 2006–07 campaign, Rubio signed with Real Valladolid, being promoted to the top flight in his first year and rarely missing a game subsequently. Mainly a defensive-minded player, he scored his first goals as a professional in 2007–08, the first coming on 28 October 2007 in a 2–2 draw at Osasuna (three for the season).

Rubio could only appear in 16 league games in 2009–10 due to injuries, and Valladolid dropped down to division two for the first time in three years. Although still afflicted by physical problems, he helped to another promotion in 2012, contributing 20 starts to the feat and going on to be a regular in the following two top-tier campaigns; he continued to be heavily played as the club returned to the second division.

=== Bengaluru ===
On 8 August 2016, the 37-year-old Rubio moved abroad for the only time in his career, signing for I-League champions Bengaluru on a four-month deal. On 30 November, after five appearances in the AFC Cup to help his team reach the final, he left.

== International career ==
Rubio was part of the Spain under-20 squad at the 1999 FIFA World Youth Championship that also included the likes of Iker Casillas and Xavi. He featured in the 3–1 group stage win against Honduras, as the tournament in Nigeria was won.

Rubio found the net in his only appearance for the under-21 team, a 2–1 home victory over Israel for the 2000 UEFA European Championship qualifiers.

== Coaching career ==
After retiring, Rubio returned to his main club Valladolid in 2017, as part of Luis César Sampedro's coaching staff. On 8 November 2023, he replaced Julio Baptista at the helm of the reserves in the Segunda Federación.

On 2 December 2024, Rubio was named caretaker manager of the main squad for their Copa del Rey match against Real Ávila, after the dismissal of Paulo Pezzolano. He returned to his previous role following the appointment of Diego Cocca two weeks later, totalling two wins in three games during his first spell.

Cocca was himself fired on 17 February 2025 with the team still last in the top division, and Rubio was confirmed as his replacement until the end of the season. On his second debut six days later, he oversaw a 7–1 loss away to Athletic Bilbao.

Rubio only managed one point from 14 matches, and left the position on 4 June 2025. He departed the club altogether on 21 July.

On 12 December 2025, Rubio was appointed head coach of Olympiacos F.C. B in the Super League Greece 2.

== Managerial statistics ==
As of match played 20 September 2026

Managerial record by team and tenure
Team	Nat	From	To	Record								Ref
Team	Nat	From	To	G	W	D	L	GF	GA	GD	Win %	Ref
Valladolid B	(Spain)	8 November 2023	17 February 2025	45	16	16	13	56	52	+4	35.56	
Valladolid (caretaker)	(Spain)	2 December 2024	14 December 2024	3	2	0	1	6	4	+2	66.67	
Valladolid	(Spain)	17 February 2025	4 June 2025	14	0	1	13	11	38	−27	0.00	
Olympiacos B	(Greece)	12 December 2025		15	6	3	6	17	21	−4	40.00	
Career total				77	24	20	33	89	115	−26	31.17	—

== Honours ==
Valladolid

- Segunda División: 2006–07

Bengaluru

- AFC Cup runner-up: 2016

Spain U20

- FIFA World Youth Championship: 1999
